= Swimming at the 2003 World Aquatics Championships – Men's 100 metre butterfly =

Men's 100m Butterfly at the 2003 FINA World Aquatics Championships
- Dates: 25 July (prelims, semifinals); 26 July (final)
- Winning time: 50.98 seconds

Medalists
gold medal	Ian Crocker	United States
silver medal	Michael Phelps	United States
bronze medal	Andriy Serdinov	Ukraine

The Men's 100 Butterfly event at the 10th FINA World Aquatics Championships swam 25–26 July 2003 in Barcelona, Spain. Preliminary and Semifinal heats swam July 25, with the prelims during the morning session and the semifinals in the evening session. The Final was held on July 26.

== Records ==
Prior to this competition, the existing world and competition records were as follows:

World record	Michael Klim (AUS)	51.81	Canberra, Australia	12 December 1999
Championship record	Lars Frölander (SWE)	52.10	Fukuoka, Japan	26 July 2001

The following records were established during the competition:

Date	Round	Name	Nationality	Time	Record
25 July	Semifinal 1	Andriy Serdinov	Ukraine	51.76	WR
25 July	Semifinal 2	Michael Phelps	United States	51.47	WR
26 July	Final	Ian Crocker	United States	50.98	WR

== Results ==
=== Final ===
Place	Swimmer	Nation	Time	Notes
1	Ian Crocker	USA	50.98	WR
2	Michael Phelps	USA	51.10	
3	Andriy Serdinov	Ukraine	51.59	ER
4	Igor Marchenko	Russia	51.95	
5	Thomas Rupprath	Germany	51.98	
6	Takashi Yamamoto	Japan	52.27	
7	Franck Esposito	France	52.68	
8	Evgueni Korotychkine	Russia	53.00	

=== Semifinals ===
Rank	Heat+Lane	Swimmer	Nation	Time	Notes
1	S2 L4	Michael Phelps	USA	51.47	q, WR
2	S1 L6	Andriy Serdinov	Ukraine	51.76	q, ER
3	S1 L4	Ian Crocker	USA	52.21	q
4	S1 L5	Thomas Rupprath	Germany	52.37	q
5	S1 L2	Igor Marchenko	Russia	52.44	q
6	S2 L5	Franck Esposito	France	52.49	q
7	S1 L8	Evgueni Korotychkine	Russia	52.55	q
7	S2 L3	Takashi Yamamoto	Japan	52.55	q
9	S1 L3	Mike Mintenko	Canada	52.57	
10	S1 L1	Joris Keizer	Netherlands	52.64	
11	S1 L7	Adam Pine	Australia	53.05	
12	S2 L8	Denis Sylantyev	Ukraine	53.12	
13	S2 L7	Geoff Huegill	Australia	53.13	
14	S2 L2	Mattia Nalesso	Italy	53.16	
15	S2 L1	Ioan Gherghel	Romania	53.18	
16	S2 L6	Johannes Dietrich	Germany	53.76	

=== Preliminaries ===
Rank	Heat+Lane	Swimmer	Nation	Time	Notes
1	H15 L4	Michael Phelps	United States	52.27	q
2	H15 L5	Ian Crocker	United States	52.35	q
3	H14 L3	Franck Esposito	France	52.85	q
4	H14 L4	Thomas Rupprath	Germany	52.91	q
4	H14 L6	Takashi Yamamoto	Japan	52.91	q
6	H15 L3	Mike Mintenko	Canada	52.92	q
7	H12 L3	Johannes Dietrich	Germany	53.01	q
8	H13 L4	Andriy Serdinov	Ukraine	53.06	q
9	H14 L8	Mattia Nalesso	Italy	53.12	q
10	H13 L5	Igor Marchenko	Russia	53.21	q
11	H14 L5	Geoff Huegill	Australia	53.28	q
12	H15 L2	Adam Pine	Australia	53.31	q
13	H15 L8	Ioan Gherghel	Romania	53.42	q
14	H15 L6	Joris Keizer	Netherlands	53.44	q
15	H12 L5	Denis Sylantyev	Ukraine	53.45	q
16	H15 L7	Evgueni Korotychkine	Russia	53.48	q
17	H13 L6	Pavel Lagoun	Belarus	53.68	
18	H13 L3	Lars Frölander	Sweden	53.74	
19	H13 L7	Corney Swanepoel	New Zealand	53.95	
20	H14 L7	Josh Ilika	Mexico	53.96	
20	H14 L1	Zsolt Gáspár	Hungary	53.96	
22	H12 L7	Kaio Almeida	Brazil	53.98	
23	H12 L8	Ryan Pini	Papua New Guinea	54.05	
24	H11 L5	Tero Välimaa	Finland	54.07	
25	H10 L1	Luis Rojas	Venezuela	54.09	
25	H15 L1	Hao Jin	China	54.09	
27	H12 L6	Theo Verster	South Africa	54.16	
28	H13 L2	Jere Hård	Finland	54.21	
29	H10 L6	Andrew Livingston	Puerto Rico	54.48	
30	H11 L6	Camilo Becerra	Colombia	54.56	
31	H11 L3	Ravil Nachaev	Uzbekistan	54.64	
31	H13 L1	Rimvydas Salcius	Lithuania	54.64	
33	H11 L1	Georgi Palazov	Bulgaria	54.70	
34	H12 L4	Simão Morgado	Portugal	54.81	
35	H11 L7	Lyndon Ferns	South Africa	54.94	
36	H10 L8	Romāns Miloslavskis	Latvia	55.12	
37	H11 L4	Erik Andersson	Sweden	55.19	
37	H11 L8	Jeong Doo-Hee	South Korea	55.19	
37	H12 L2	Gabriel Mangabeira	Brazil	55.19	
40	H10 L5	Aleksandar Miladinovski	Macedonia	55.23	
41	H09 L2	Petter Sjodal	Norway	55.27	
42	H09 L4	Aghiles Slimani	Algeria	55.40	
43	H08 L4	Pavel Suškov	Lithuania	55.64	
44	H09 L3	Rustam Khudiyev	Kazakhstan	55.66	
45	H07 L4	Nicholas Rees	Bahamas	55.89	
46	H10 2L	Philipp Gilgen	Switzerland	55.90	
47	H10 L7	Zoran Lazarovski	Macedonia	55.93	
48	H10 L3	Luis Monteiro	Portugal	55.95	
49	H10 L4	David Kolozar	Hungary	56.07	
50	H09 L1	Jae Hyon Joe	South Korea	56.30	
51	H08 L8	Huazhang Zheng	China	56.36	
52	H08 L6	Conrad Francis	Sri Lanka	56.55	
53	H09 L5	Luc Decker	Luxembourg	56.56	
54	H09 L6	Albert Subirats	Venezuela	56.73	
55	H08 L5	Oleg Lyashko	Uzbekistan	56.76	
56	H09 L8	Raouf Benabid	Algeria	56.88	
57	H09 L7	Yu Lung Lubrey Lim	Malaysia	56.95	
58	H06 L5	Lorenz Liechti	Switzerland	57.04	
59	H08 L3	Wing Cheung Victor Wong	Macau	57.28	
60	H07 L2	Nedim Nišić	Bosnia and Herzegovina	57.39	
61	H08 L1	William Muriel	Ecuador	57.52	
62	H07 L7	Ignacio Sanchez Leon	Peru	57.69	
63	H08 L2	Shui Ki Szeto	Hong Kong	57.81	
64	H06 L4	Jorge Arturo Arce	Costa Rica	57.87	
65	H07 L8	Gunther Streit	Namibia	57.93	
66	H07 L5	James Walsh	Philippines	58.04	
67	H04 L7	Khaly Ciss	Senegal	58.62	
68	H06 L2	Tuck Kar Wong	Malaysia	58.66	
69	H05 L4	Davy Bisslik	Aruba	58.67	
70	H06 L7	Miguel Navarro	Bolivia	58.71	
70	H07 L3	Sergio Cabrera	Paraguay	58.71	
72	H08 L7	David Cartin	Costa Rica	58.79	
73	H07 L6	Stavros Michaelides	Cyprus	58.80	
74	H06 L1	Jean Paul Adam	Seychelles	58.85	
75	H05 L3	Yann Lausan	Tahiti	58.91	
76	H06 L3	Gordon Touw Ngie Tjouw	Suriname	59.05	
77	H05 L2	Roy Barahona	Honduras	59.09	
78	H05 L5	Jewel Md. Jewel Ahmed	Bangladesh	59.22	
79	H05 L7	Cliff Gittens	Barbados	59.35	
80	H06 L8	Zurab Khomasuridze	Georgia	59.56	
81	H07 L1	Rafael de Leon Alfaro	Guatemala	59.81	
82	H05 L8	Malick Fall	Senegal	59.90	
83	H04 L5	Chad Miller	Fiji	59.93	
84	H04 L8	Bertrand Bristol	Seychelles	1:00.30	
85	H02 L4	Fernando Medrano	Nicaragua	1:00.80	
86	H02 L2	Musa Bakare	Nigeria	1:00.87	
87	H04 L4	Abed Rahman Kaaki	Lebanon	1:01.08	
88	H03 L2	Obied Ahmed Al Jassimi	United Arab Emirates	1:01.16	
89	H03 L5	Dean Palacios	Northern Mariana Islands	1:01.19	
90	H04 L3	Joao Matias	Angola	1:01.37	
91	H04 L6	Marc Dansou	Benin	1:01.66	
92	H01 L1	Aung Kyaw Moe	Myanmar	1:01.67	
93	H05 L1	Babak Farhoudi	Iran	1:01.73	
94	H02 L3	Joao Aguiar	Angola	1:01.89	
95	H03 L6	Omar Núñez	Nicaragua	1:02.15	
96	H04 L2	Benjamin Wells	Papua New Guinea	1:02.31	
97	H03 L7	Ammar Musaed Al Tamimi	United Arab Emirates	1:02.41	
98	H01 L4	Ilidio Matusse	Mozambique	1:02.95	
98	H03 L4	Raad Awisat	Palestine	1:02.95	
100	H02 L8	Kabir Walia	Kenya	1:03.18	
101	H02 L7	Rony Bakale	Republic of the Congo	1:03.61	
102	H03 L8	Zaid Saeed	Iraq	1:04.42	
103	H05 L6	Gustavo Adolfo Martinez	Honduras	1:05.57	
104	H01 L7	Maximilien J. Doualla Frederic	Cameroon	1:06.14	
105	H02 L5	Daniel Kang	Guam	1:06.30	
106	H01 L5	Kin-Vincent Duenas	Guam	1:06.46	
107	H02 L1	Neils Agius	Malta	1:07.19	
108	H01 L6	Muzeya Muzyamba	Zambia	1:08.82	
109	H01 L2	Chisela Kanchela	Zambia	1:12.62	
110	H01 L8	Hassan Mubah	Maldives	1:14.43	
-	H14 L2	Ryo Takayasu	Japan	DQ	
-	-	Frédérick Bousquet	France	DNS	
-	-	Milorad Čavić	FR Yugoslavia	DNS	
-	-	Pablo Martín Abal	Argentina	DNS	
-	-	Ronald Cowen	Bermuda	DNS	
-	-	Gregory Arkhurst	Ivory Coast	DNS	
-	-	Landry Degnifo Enokorin	Ivory Coast	DNS	
-	-	Yan Lin Aung	Myanmar	DNS	
-	-	Sean Chow	Fiji	DNS	
-	-	Clark Randrianandraina	Madagascar	DNS	
