= Swimming at the 2003 World Aquatics Championships – Men's 200 metre butterfly =

Men's 200m Butterfly at the 2003 FINA World Aquatics Championships
- Dates: 22 July 2003 (prelims, semifinals); 23 July 2003 (final)
- Winning time: 1 minute 54.35 seconds

Medalists
gold medal	Michael Phelps	United States
silver medal	Takashi Yamamoto	Japan
bronze medal	Tom Malchow	United States

The Men's 200 Butterfly event at the 10th FINA World Aquatics Championships swam 22 – 23 July 2003 in Barcelona, Spain. Preliminary and Semifinal heats were on July 22, with the preliminaries during the morning session and the semifinals during the evening session. The Final swam during the evening session on July 23.

At the start of the event, the existing World (WR) and Championship (CR) records were both:

- WR and CR: 1:54.58 swum by Michael Phelps (USA) on 24 July 2001 in Fukuoka, Japan

== Results ==
=== Final ===
Place	Swimmer	Nation	Time	Notes
1	Michael Phelps	USA	1:54.35	
2	Takashi Yamamoto	Japan	1:55.52	
3	Tom Malchow	USA	1:55.66	
4	Steve Parry	Great Britain	1:56.10	
5	Denis Sylantyev	Ukraine	1:56.36	
6	Serhiy Advena	Ukraine	1:57.21	
7	Justin Norris	Australia	1:58.22	
8	Travis Nederpelt	Australia	1:58.95	

=== Semifinals ===
Rank	Heat+Lane	Swimmer	Nation	Time	Notes
1	S2 L4	Michael Phelps	USA	1:53.93	q, WR
2	S2 L5	Tom Malchow	USA	1:55.90	q
2	S2 L2	Steve Parry	Great Britain	1:55.90	q
4	S1 L4	Takashi Yamamoto	Japan	1:56.35	q
5	S2 L8	Denis Sylantyev	Ukraine	1:56.96	q
6	S2 L7	Travis Nederpelt	Australia	1:57.28	q
7	S2 L6	Justin Norris	Australia	1:57.31	q
8	S1 L7	Serhiy Advena	Ukraine	1:57.32	q
9	S2 L3	Peng Wu	China	1:57.60	q
10	S1 L2	Ioan Gherghel	Romania	1:57.97	q
10	S1 L6	Anatoli Poliakov	Russia	1:57.97	q
12	S1 L5	Ioannis Drymonakos	Greece	1:58.34	q
13	S1 L1	Kaio Almeida	Brazil	1:58.83	q
14	S1 L3	Paweł Korzeniowski	Poland	1:59.10	q
15	S1 L8	Nikolai Skvortsov	Russia	1:59.21	q
16	S2 L1	Helge Meeuw	Germany	1:59.96	q

=== Preliminaries ===
Rank	Heat+Lane	Swimmer	Nation	Time	Notes
1	H8 L4	Michael Phelps	United States	1:55.70	q
2	H8 L5	Takashi Yamamoto	Japan	1:56.95	q
3	H7 L4	Tom Malchow	United States	1:57.25	q
4	H9 L2	Ioannis Drymonakos	Greece	1:57.83	q
5	H7 L5	Peng Wu	China	1:57.96	q
6	H8 L7	Paweł Korzeniowski	Poland	1:58.06	q
7	H8 L3	Justin Norris	Australia	1:58.09	q
7	H9 L3	Anatoli Poliakov	Russia	1:58.09	q
9	H9 L3	Steve Parry	Great Britain	1:58.11	q
10	H7 L3	Ioan Gherghel	Romania	1:58.24	q
11	H7 L2	Travis Nederpelt	Australia	1:58.25	q
12	H8 L2	Serhiy Advena	Ukraine	1:58.62	q
13	H4 L6	Helge Meeuw	Germany	1:58.64	q
14	H7 L1	Kaio Almeida	Brazil	1:58.83	q
15	H9 L5	Denys Sylantyev	Ukraine	1:58.86	q
16	H8 L8	Nikolai Skvortsov	Russia	1:59.00	q
17	H9 L7	Kyu Chul Han	South Korea	1:59.57	
18	H9 L1	Pedro Monteiro	Brazil	1:59.75	
19	H8 L6	Kentaro Usuda	Japan	1:59.83	
20	H6 L1	Andrew Livingston	Puerto Rico	1:59.89	
21	H7 L6	David Kolozar	Hungary	2:00.09	
22	H7 L7	Brian Johns	Canada	2:00.48	
23	H6 L4	Johannes Dietrich	Germany	2:00.57	
24	H6 L3	Huazhang Zheng	China	2:00.60	
25	H6 L5	Tero Välimaa	Finland	2:01.12	
26	H6 L7	Philipp Gilgen	Switzerland	2:01.26	
27	H9 L4	Franck Esposito	France	2:01.35	
28	H6 L6	Viktor Bodrogi	Hungary	2:01.49	
29	H7 L8	Luís Monteiro	Portugal	2:01.57	
30	H5 L2	Georgi Palazov	Bulgaria	2:01.58	
31	H9 L8	Juan Pablo Valdivieso	Peru	2:01.69	
32	H6 L8	Jae Hyon Joe	South Korea	2:01.87	
33	H5 L3	Michael Halika	Israel	2:02.45	
34	H5 L4	Dean Kent	New Zealand	2:02.66	
35	H5 L6	Aghiles Slimani	Algeria	2:03.18	
36	H5 L1	Zoran Lazarovski	Macedonia	2:03.69	
37	H5 L5	Theo Verster	South Africa	2:04.14	
38	H5 L7	Paulius Andrijauskas	Lithuania	2:04.80	
39	H3 L5	Sergio Cabrera	Paraguay	2:04.89	
40	H3 L4	Carlo Piccio	Philippines	2:05.44	
41	H4 L5	Luc Decker	Luxembourg	2:06.18	
42	H4 L2	Anovar Bennaceur	Tunisia	2:06.24	
43	H4 L3	Oleg Lyashko	Uzbekistan	2:06.48	
44	H4 L1	Shui Ki Szeto	Hong Kong	2:06.80	
45	H5 L8	James Walsh	Philippines	2:07.46	
46	H3 L8	Rehan Poncha	India	2:08.05	
47	H4 L4	Oleg Pukhnaty	Uzbekistan	2:08.57	
48	H3 L2	Marcos Burgos	Chile	2:08.87	
49	H2 L5	Jorge Arturo Arce	Costa Rica	2:09.04	
50	H4 L7	William Muriel	Ecuador	2:09.07	
51	H3 L7	Roy Barahona	Honduras	2:10.31	
52	H3 L3	Rafael de Leon Alfaro	Guatemala	2:10.38	
53	H3 L6	David Cartin	Costa Rica	2:10.88	
54	H2 L3	Günther Streit	Namibia	2:10.99	
55	H2 L4	Bertrand Bristol	Seychelles	2:11.59	
56	H2 L1	Jean Paul Adam	Seychelles	2:13.44	
57	H2 L2	Dean Palacios	Northern Mariana Islands	2:15.33	
58	H3 L1	Ivan Grougnet	Andorra	2:15.45	
59	H4 L8	Mohammed Al-Yousef	Saudi Arabia	2:15.46	
60	H1 L4	Nuno Rola	Angola	2:18.32	
61	H2 L6	Ben Wells	Papua New Guinea	2:19.84	
62	H2 L8	Yann Lausan	Tahiti	2:20.12	
-	-	Christian Galenda	Italy	DNS	
-	-	Simão Morgado	Portugal	DNS	
-	-	Raad Awisat	Palestine	DNS	
-	-	Landry Degnifo Enokorin	Ivory Coast	DNS	
