= Swimming at the 2001 World Aquatics Championships – Men's 100 metre butterfly =

Men's 100 metre butterfly at the 2001 FINA World Championships
- Dates: 25 July 2001 (heats, semifinals); 26 July 2001 (final)
- Competitors: 74
- Winning time: 52.10 seconds

Medalists
gold medal	Lars Frölander	Sweden
silver medal	Ian Crocker	United States
bronze medal	Geoff Huegill	Australia

The men's 100 metre butterfly event at the 2001 World Aquatics Championships took place 26 July. The heats and semifinals took place on 25 July, with the final being held on 26 July.

== Records ==
Prior to the competition, the existing world and championship records were as follows:

World record	Michael Klim (AUS)	51.81	Canberra, Australia	12 December 1999
Championship record	Michael Klim (AUS)	52.25	Perth, Australia	16 January 1998

The following record was established during the competition:

Date	Round	Name	Nation	Time	Record
25 July 2001	Semifinal	Lars Frölander	Sweden	52.17	CR
26 July 2001	Final	Lars Frölander	Sweden	52.10	CR

== Results ==
=== Heats ===
Rank	Name	Nationality	Time	Notes
1	Andriy Serdinov	Ukraine	52.97	Q
2	Vladislav Kulikov	Russia	53.03	Q
3	Mike Mintenko	Canada	53.04	Q
3	Geoff Huegill	Australia	53.04	Q
5	Ian Crocker	United States	53.08	Q
6	Franck Esposito	France	53.11	Q
7	Lars Frölander	Sweden	53.14	Q
8	Thomas Rupprath	Germany	53.31	Q
9	Igor Martchenko	Russia	53.52	Q
10	Takashi Yamamoto	Japan	53.53	Q
10	Joris Keizer	Netherlands	53.53	Q
12	Tero Välimaa	Finland	53.66	Q
13	Jere Hård	Finland	53.73	Q
14	Michael Klim	Australia	53.83	Q
15	Denys Sylantyev	Ukraine	53.86	Q
16	Ouyang Kunpeng	China	53.94	Q
17	Peter Mankoč	Slovenia	54.03	
18	Zsolt Gáspár	Hungary	54.06	
19	Daniel Jones	United States	54.20	
20	Ryo Takayasu	Japan	54.22	
21	Ioan Gherghel	Romania	54.26	
22	Fernando Alves	Brazil	54.36	
22	Christian Galenda	Italy	54.36	
24	Daniel Morales	Spain	54.50	
25	Simão Morgado	Portugal	54.64	
26	Pablo Martín Abal	Argentina	54.65	
27	Milorad Čavić	FR Yugoslavia	54.71	
28	Camilo Becerra	Colombia	54.79	
29	Andrew Livingston	Puerto Rico	54.93	
30	Fabian Friedrich	Germany	54.98	
31	Ivan Mladina	Croatia	55.03	
32	Oswaldo Quevedo	Venezuela	55.18	
33	Cesar Uribe	Mexico	55.19	
34	Aleksandar Miladinovski	North Macedonia	55.30	
34	Jesús González	Mexico	55.30	
36	Ioannis Drymonakos	Greece	55.95	
37	Dzmitri Koshel	Belarus	56.19	
38	Luc Decker	Luxembourg	56.23	
39	Lorenz Liechti	Switzerland	56.47	
40	Zoran Lazarevski	North Macedonia	56.56	
41	Yu Jeong-Nam	South Korea	56.59	
42	Petter Sjodal	Norway	56.64	
43	Oleg Lyashko	Uzbekistan	56.89	
43	Joe Jae-Hyon	South Korea	56.89	
45	Benjamin Gan	Singapore	56.97	
46	Danil Haustov	Estonia	57.09	
47	Wu Nien-Pin	Chinese Taipei	57.34	
48	Mark Chay	Singapore	57.66	
49	Carlos Meléndez	El Salvador	58.54	
50	Yu Lung Lubrey Lim	Malaysia	58.56	
51	Nicholas Diaper	Kenya	58.59	
52	Gustavo Barrios	Panama	58.98	
53	Sergio Rafael De Leon Alfaro	Guatemala	59.02	
54	Chon Kit Alias Joao Tang	Macau	59.14	
55	Davy Bisslik	Aruba	59.22	
56	Chen Jui-Chen	Chinese Taipei	59.36	
57	Kenny Roberts	Seychelles	59.45	
58	Khuwiater Saeed Had Al Dhaheri	United Arab Emirates	59.47	
59	Christophe Lim Wen Ying	Mauritius	1:00.04	
60	Obaid Ahmed Al Jassimi	United Arab Emirates	1:00.25	
61	Bertrand Bristol	Seychelles	1:00.38	
62	Keng Ip Lou	Macau	1:00.42	
63	Hamid Nassir	Kenya	1:00.74	
64	Omar Núñez	Nicaragua	1:00.87	
65	Zulfiqar Ali	Pakistan	1:00.97	
66	Naji Ferguson	Grenada	1:01.11	
67	Gael Souci	Mauritius	1:01.36	
68	Zaid Saeed	Iraq	1:02.93	
69	João Carlos Paquet Aguiar	Angola	1:03.52	
70	Dean Palacios	Northern Mariana Islands	1:03.71	
71	Bayarerdene Soninerdene	Mongolia	1:04.82	
72	Loren Lindborg	Marshall Islands	1:09.38	
–	Nuno Miguel Cardoso Rola	Angola	DSQ	
–	Georgi Palazov	Bulgaria	DSQ	
–	Derya Büyükuncu	Turkey	DNS	

=== Semifinals ===
Rank	Name	Nationality	Time	Notes
1	Lars Frölander	Sweden	52.17	Q, CR
2	Michael Klim	Australia	52.50	Q
3	Takashi Yamamoto	Japan	52.55	Q
4	Ian Crocker	United States	52.63	Q
5	Mike Mintenko	Canada	52.81	Q
6	Geoff Huegill	Australia	52.91	Q
7	Franck Esposito	France	52.96	Q
8	Vladislav Kulikov	Russia	52.98	Q
9	Jere Hård	Finland	53.08	
10	Denys Sylantyev	Ukraine	53.17	
11	Tero Välimaa	Finland	53.19	
11	Andriy Serdinov	Ukraine	53.19	
13	Thomas Rupprath	Germany	53.27	
14	Igor Martchenko	Russia	53.67	
15	Joris Keizer	Netherlands	53.72	
16	Ouyang Kunpeng	China	54.00	

=== Final ===
Rank	Name	Nationality	Time	Notes
1st place, gold medalist(s)	Lars Frölander	Sweden	52.10	CR
2nd place, silver medalist(s)	Ian Crocker	United States	52.25	
3rd place, bronze medalist(s)	Geoff Huegill	Australia	52.36	
4	Takashi Yamamoto	Japan	52.56	
5	Vladislav Kulikov	Russia	52.69	
6	Mike Mintenko	Canada	52.82	
7	Michael Klim	Australia	52.91	
8	Franck Esposito	France	53.33	
