= Swimming at the 2001 World Aquatics Championships – Men's 50 metre butterfly =

Men's 50 metre butterfly at the 2001 FINA World Championships
- Dates: 27 July 2001 (heats, semifinals); 28 July 2001 (final)
- Competitors: 80
- Winning time: 23.50 seconds

Medalists
gold medal	Geoff Huegill	Australia
silver medal	Lars Frölander	Sweden
bronze medal	Mark Foster	Great Britain

The men's 50 metre butterfly event at the 2001 World Aquatics Championships took place 28 July. The heats and semifinals took place 27 July, with the final being held on 28 July.

== Records ==
Prior to the competition, the existing world and championship records were as follows:

World record	Geoff Huegill (AUS)	23.60	Sydney, Australia	14 May 2000
Championship record	New event			

The following record was established during the competition:

Date	Round	Name	Nation	Time	Record
27 July	Heat 10	Geoff Huegill	Australia	23.71	CR
27 July	Semifinal 2	Geoff Huegill	Australia	23.44	WR

== Results ==
=== Heats ===
Rank	Name	Nationality	Time	Notes
1	Geoff Huegill	Australia	23.71	Q, CR
2	Jere Hård	Finland	23.91	Q
3	Roland Schoeman	South Africa	23.96	Q
4	Mark Foster	United Kingdom	24.02	Q
5	Lars Frölander	Sweden	24.03	Q
6	Ewout Holst	Netherlands	24.08	Q
7	Vladislav Kulikov	Russia	24.14	Q
8	Ian Crocker	United States	24.27	Q
9	Joris Keizer	Netherlands	24.28	Q
10	Thomas Rupprath	Germany	24.31	Q
11	Zsolt Gáspár	Hungary	24.36	Q
12	Ravil Nachaev	Uzbekistan	24.38	Q
13	Michael Klim	Australia	24.39	Q
14	Pablo Martín Abal	Argentina	24.40	Q
15	Tero Välimaa	Finland	24.42	Q
16	Andriy Serdinov	Ukraine	24.45	QSO
16	Oswaldo Quevedo	Venezuela	24.45	QSO
18	Duje Draganja	Croatia	24.47	
19	Igor Marchenko	Russia	24.50	
20	Javier Noriega	Spain	24.53	
21	Daniel Jones	United States	24.55	
22	Mike Mintenko	Canada	24.57	
22	Miloš Milošević	Croatia	24.57	
24	Camilo Becerra	Colombia	24.58	
25	Fabian Friedrich	Germany	24.59	
26	Ryo Takayasu	Japan	24.64	
27	Milorad Čavić	Yugoslavia	24.79	
28	Takashi Yamamoto	Japan	24.83	
28	Dzmitri Koshel	Belarus	24.83	
28	Nicholas Santos	Brazil	24.83	
31	Jorge Luis Ulibarri	Spain	24.93	
32	Petter Sjodal	Norway	24.95	
33	Jesús González	Mexico	24.96	
34	Fernando Alves	Brazil	25.05	
35	Kim Min-Suk	South Korea	25.09	
36	Simão Morgado	Portugal	25.18	
37	Lorenz Liechti	Switzerland	25.19	
38	Luc Decker	Luxembourg	25.21	
39	Rolandas Gimbutis	Lithuania	25.27	
40	Danil Haustov	Estonia	25.34	
41	Georgi Palazov	Bulgaria	25.58	
42	Aleksandar Miladinovski	North Macedonia	25.77	
43	Cesar Uribe	Mexico	25.84	
44	Ismael Ortiz	Panama	26.02	
45	Zoran Lazarevski	North Macedonia	26.08	
46	Carl Probert	Fiji	26.09	
47	Ying Wah Leslie Kwok	Singapore	26.13	
48	Wu Nien-Pin	Chinese Taipei	26.15	
49	Dean Kent	New Zealand	26.17	
50	Gustavo Barrios	Panama	26.20	
50	Musa Bakare	Nigeria	26.20	
52	Wing Cheung Victor Wong	Macau	26.58	
53	Christophe Lim Wen Ying	Mauritius	26.60	
54	Gregory Arkhurst	Ivory Coast	26.62	
55	Yu Lung Lubrey Lim	Malaysia	26.70	
56	Kenny Roberts	Seychelles	26.78	
57	Nicholas Diaper	Kenya	26.83	
58	Saad Khalloqi	Morocco	26.85	
59	Cliff Gittens	Barbados	26.86	
60	Benjamin Gan	Singapore	26.88	
61	Keng Ip Lou	Macau	27.12	
62	Davy Bisslik	Aruba	27.17	
63	Ahmed Ouattara Zie	Ivory Coast	27.19	
64	Hamid Nassir	Kenya	27.41	
65	Chen Jui-Chen	Chinese Taipei	27.47	
66	Naji Ferguson	Grenada	27.49	
67	Gael Souci	Mauritius	27.55	
68	Sergio Rafael De Leon Alfaro	Guatemala	27.76	
69	Zaid Saeed	Iraq	27.78	
70	João Aguiar	Angola	27.90	
71	Bertrand Bristol	Seychelles	27.97	
72	Daniel Kang	Guam	28.00	
73	Mohammad Nazeri	Iran	28.19	
74	Dean Palacios	Northern Mariana Islands	28.61	
75	Kenneth Maronie	Dominica	28.69	
76	Rainui Teriipaia	Tahiti	28.90	
77	Seung Gin Lee	Northern Mariana Islands	28.99	
78	Nuno Miguel Rola	Angola	29.44	
79	Kin-Vincent Duenas	Guam	29.74	
80	Rony Bakale	Republic of the Congo	31.46	
–	Derya Buyukuncu	Turkey	DNS	
–	Eithan Urbach	Israel	DNS	
–	Mehdi Addadi	Algeria	DNS	
–	Mamoon Ahmad	Sudan	DNS	
–	Peter Mankoc	Slovenia	DNS	
–	Khuwiater Saeed Had Al Dhaheri	United Arab Emirates	DNS	

==== Swim-off ====
Rank	Name	Nationality	Time	Notes
1	Andriy Serdinov	Ukraine	24.47	Q
2	Oswaldo Quevedo	Venezuela	24.54	

=== Semifinals ===
Rank	Name	Nationality	Time	Notes
1	Geoff Huegill	Australia	23.44	Q, WR
2	Mark Foster	United Kingdom	23.66	Q
3	Roland Schoeman	South Africa	23.68	Q
4	Lars Frölander	Sweden	23.73	Q
5	Ewout Holst	Netherlands	23.91	Q
6	Tero Välimaa	Finland	23.93	Q
7	Ian Crocker	United States	23.97	Q
8	Thomas Rupprath	Germany	24.01	Q
9	Jere Hård	Finland	24.04	
10	Vladislav Kulikov	Russia	24.18	
11	Michael Klim	Australia	24.23	
12	Pablo Martín Abal	Argentina	24.26	
13	Andriy Serdinov	Ukraine	24.31	
14	Ravil Nachaev	Uzbekistan	24.40	
14	Joris Keizer	Netherlands	24.40	
16	Zsolt Gáspár	Hungary	24.45	

=== Final ===
Rank	Name	Nationality	Time	Notes
1st place, gold medalist(s)	Geoff Huegill	Australia	23.50	
2nd place, silver medalist(s)	Lars Frölander	Sweden	23.57	
3rd place, bronze medalist(s)	Mark Foster	United Kingdom	23.62	
4	Roland Schoeman	South Africa	23.76	
5	Ian Crocker	United States	23.85	
6	Ewout Holst	Netherlands	23.99	
7	Tero Välimaa	Finland	24.10	
8	Thomas Rupprath	Germany	24.16	
