= Swimming at the 2001 World Aquatics Championships – Men's 200 metre butterfly =

Men's 200 metre butterfly at the 2001 FINA World Championships
- Dates: 23 July 2001 (heats, semifinals); 24 July 2001 (final)
- Competitors: 40
- Winning time: 1 minute 54.58 seconds

Medalists
gold medal	Michael Phelps	United States
silver medal	Tom Malchow	United States
bronze medal	Anatoly Polyakov	Russia

The men's 200-metre butterfly event at the 2001 World Aquatics Championships took place between 23 July – 24 July. Both the heats and semifinals were held on 23 July with the heats being held in the morning session and the semifinals being held in the evening session. The final was held on 24 July.

In the final, American swimmer Michael Phelps broke his own world record with a time of 1:54.58, bettering his previous record of 1:54.92. For Phelps, this was also his first world title since finishing 5th in the same event at the 2000 Summer Olympics.

== Records ==
Prior to the competition, the existing world and championship records were as follows:

World record	Michael Phelps (USA)	1:54.92	Austin, United States	30 March 2001
Championship record	Melvin Stewart (USA)	1:55.69	Perth, Australia	12 January 1991

The following record was established during the competition:

Date	Round	Name	Nation	Time	Record
23 July	Semifinal 2	Franck Esposito	France	1:55.03	CR
23 July	Semifinal 2	Tom Malchow	United States	1:55.03	CR
24 July	Final	Michael Phelps	United States	1:54.58	WR

== Results ==
=== Heats ===
Rank	Name	Nationality	Time	Notes
1	Franck Esposito	France	1:56.05	Q
2	Michael Phelps	United States	1:56.11	Q
3	Tom Malchow	United States	1:56.13	Q
4	Takashi Yamamoto	Japan	1:57.76	Q
5	Justin Norris	Australia	1:57.79	Q
6	Thomas Rupprath	Germany	1:57.80	Q
7	Anatoly Polyakov	Russia	1:58.27	Q
8	Denys Sylantyev	Ukraine	1:58.41	Q
9	Ioan Gherghel	Romania	1:58.71	Q
10	Andrew Livingston	Puerto Rico	1:58.72	Q
11	Juan José Veloz	Mexico	1:58.85	Q
12	Christian Galenda	Italy	1:59.31	Q
13	Ioannis Drymonakos	Greece	1:59.41	Q
14	Tero Välimaa	Finland	1:59.77	Q
15	William Kirby	Australia	2:00.12	Q
16	Viktor Bodrogi	Hungary	2:00.54	Q
17	Alessio Boggiatto	Italy	2:01.32	
18	Xie Xufeng	China	2:01.37	
19	Mickey Halika	Israel	2:01.67	
20	Simão Morgado	Portugal	2:02.10	
21	Hisayoshi Tanaka	Japan	2:02.72	
22	Dean Kent	New Zealand	2:03.09	
23	Zoran Lazarevski	Macedonia	2:03.71	
24	Jacob Fraire	Mexico	2:03.72	
25	Joe Jae-hyon	South Korea	2:03.95	
26	Yoo Jung-nam	South Korea	2:03.96	
27	Benjamin Gan	Singapore	2:04.19	
28	Aleksandar Miladinovski	Macedonia	2:04.22	
29	Raazik Nordien	South Africa	2:05.29	
30	Georgi Palazov	Bulgaria	2:05.31	
31	Sergio Cabrera	Paraguay	2:06.51	
32	Sergio Rafael De Leon Alfaro	Guatemala	2:06.81	
33	Jiang Bing-Ru	Chinese Taipei	2:08.73	
34	Chen Jui-Chen	Chinese Taipei	2:08.97	
35	Oleg Lyashko	Uzbekistan	2:09.90	
36	Carlos Melendez	El Salvador	2:11.38	
37	Bertrand Bristol	Seychelles	2:12.28	
38	Zulfiqar Ali	Pakistan	2:15.78	
39	Obaid Ahmed Al Jassimi	United Arab Emirates	2:17.03	
40	Zaid Saeed	Iraq	2:29.74	

=== Semifinals ===
Rank	Name	Nationality	Time	Notes
1	Franck Esposito	France	1:55.03	Q, CR
1	Tom Malchow	United States	1:55.03	Q, CR
3	Michael Phelps	United States	1:56.41	Q
4	Denys Sylantyev	Ukraine	1:56.51	Q
5	Takashi Yamamoto	Japan	1:56.85	Q
6	Justin Norris	Australia	1:56.98	Q
7	Anatoly Polyakov	Russia	1:57.34	Q
8	Andrew Livingston	Puerto Rico	1:57.94	Q
9	Ioan Gherghel	Romania	1:57.96	
10	Thomas Rupprath	Germany	1:58.15	
11	Christian Galenda	Italy	1:58.20	
12	Viktor Bodrogi	Hungary	1:58.60	
13	Juan José Veloz	Mexico	1:59.06	
14	William Kirby	Australia	1:59.52	
15	Ioannis Drymonakos	Greece	1:59.56	
16	Tero Välimaa	Finland	2:01.37	

=== Final ===
Rank	Name	Nationality	Time	Notes
1st place, gold medalist(s)	Michael Phelps	United States	1:54.58	WR
2nd place, silver medalist(s)	Tom Malchow	United States	1:55.28	
3rd place, bronze medalist(s)	Anatoly Polyakov	Russia	1:55.68	
4	Franck Esposito	France	1:55.71	
5	Takashi Yamamoto	Japan	1:55.84	
6	Denys Sylantyev	Ukraine	1:56.71	
7	Justin Norris	Australia	1:57.18	
8	Andrew Livingston	Puerto Rico	1:58.68	

Key: WR = World record
