= Swimming at the 2004 Summer Olympics – Men's 100 metre butterfly =

Men's 100 metre butterfly at the Games of the XXVIII Olympiad
- Venue: Olympic Aquatic Centre
- Date: August 19, 2004 (heats & semifinals); August 20, 2004 (final)
- Competitors: 59 from 52 nations
- Winning time: 51.25 OR

Medalists
1st place, gold medalist(s)		Michael Phelps	United States
2nd place, silver medalist(s)		Ian Crocker	United States
3rd place, bronze medalist(s)		Andriy Serdinov	Ukraine

The men's 100 metre butterfly event at the 2004 Olympic Games was contested at the Olympic Aquatic Centre of the Athens Olympic Sports Complex in Athens, Greece on August 19 and 20.

U.S. swimmer Michael Phelps broke an Olympic record of 51.25 to claim his fifth gold medal, edging out his teammate and world record holder Ian Crocker by four hundredths of a second (0.04). Meanwhile, Ukraine's Andriy Serdinov earned a bronze in a European record of 51.36. Earlier in the semifinals, Serdinov blasted a new Olympic record, previously set by Australia's Geoff Huegill in Sydney four years ago, with a time of 51.74. One heat later, Phelps stopped the clock at 51.61 to lower the record by 0.13 of a second.

== Records ==
Prior to this competition, the existing world and Olympic records were as follows.

World record	Ian Crocker (USA)	50.76	Long Beach, United States	13 July 2004
Olympic record	Geoff Huegill (AUS)	51.96	Sydney, Australia	21 September 2000

The following new world and Olympic records were set during this competition.

Date	Event	Name	Nationality	Time	Record
August 19	Semifinal 1	Andriy Serdinov	Ukraine	51.74	OR
August 19	Semifinal 2	Michael Phelps	United States	51.61	OR
August 20	Final	Michael Phelps	United States	51.25	OR

== Results ==
=== Heats ===
Rank	Heat	Lane	Name	Nationality	Time	Notes
1	8	4	Ian Crocker	United States	52.03	Q
2	6	4	Andriy Serdinov	Ukraine	52.05	Q
3	7	4	Michael Phelps	United States	52.35	Q
4	5	4	Milorad Čavić	Serbia and Montenegro	52.44	Q
5	7	7	Geoff Huegill	Australia	52.54	Q
6	7	1	Duje Draganja	Croatia	52.56	Q
7	7	5	Thomas Rupprath	Germany	52.57	Q
8	8	3	Franck Esposito	France	52.61	Q
9	8	5	Igor Marchenko	Russia	52.62	Q
10	7	6	Takashi Yamamoto	Japan	52.71	Q
11	8	2	Gabriel Mangabeira	Brazil	52.76	Q
12	7	2	James Hickman	Great Britain	52.91	Q
13	6	3	Yevgeny Korotyshkin	Russia	52.93	Q
14	8	6	Mike Mintenko	Canada	52.96	Q
15	7	3	Corney Swanepoel	New Zealand	53.07	Q
16	8	7	Helge Meeuw	Germany	53.11	Q
17	8	8	Kaio Almeida	Brazil	53.22	
18	5	1	Ryan Pini	Papua New Guinea	53.26	
19	6	6	Joris Keizer	Netherlands	53.41	
20	8	1	Adam Pine	Australia	53.45	
21	6	2	Denys Sylantyev	Ukraine	53.46	
22	6	5	Todd Cooper	Great Britain	53.48	
23	6	1	Mattia Nalesso	Italy	53.49	
24	5	7	Simão Morgado	Portugal	53.53	
25	5	5	Frederick Bousquet	France	53.63	
26	5	6	Pavel Lagoun	Belarus	53.87	
27	7	8	Ioan Gherghel	Romania	53.89	
28	4	4	Jere Hård	Finland	54.02	
29	4	6	Peter Mankoč	Slovenia	54.14	
30	6	8	Eugene Botes	South Africa	54.15	
31	4	5	Sotirios Pastras	Greece	54.20	
32	5	2	Erik Andersson	Sweden	54.26	
33	6	7	Joshua Ilika Brenner	Mexico	54.29	
34	5	3	Zsolt Gáspár	Hungary	54.43	
35	4	1	Rimvydas Šalčius	Lithuania	54.46	
36	5	8	Luis Rojas	Venezuela	54.58	
37	4	2	Camilo Becerra	Colombia	54.71	
38	3	5	Jeong Doo-hee	South Korea	54.76	
39	2	3	Michal Rubáček	Czech Republic	54.87	
40	4	7	Georgi Palazov	Bulgaria	54.91	
41	3	7	Rustam Khudiyev	Kazakhstan	55.03	
42	3	2	Hjörtur Már Reynisson	Iceland	55.12	
43	4	3	Wu Peng	China	55.17	
44	3	4	Eduardo Germán Otero	Argentina	55.24	
45	3	3	Aleksandar Miladinovski	Macedonia	55.71	
46	2	6	Oleg Lyashko	Uzbekistan	55.90	
47	3	1	Juan Pablo Valdivieso	Peru	55.98	
48	3	6	Aghiles Slimani	Algeria	56.22	
49	3	8	Onur Uras	Turkey	56.37	
50	2	5	Nicholas Rees	Bahamas	56.39	
51	2	8	Gordon Touw Ngie Tjouw	Suriname	56.68	
52	2	2	Conrad Francis	Sri Lanka	56.80	
53	4	8	Andrejs Dūda	Latvia	56.81	
54	2	4	Andy Wibowo	Indonesia	56.86	
55	2	7	Daniel O'Keeffe	Guam	57.39	
56	2	1	Davy Bisslik	Aruba	57.85	
57	1	5	Luis Matias	Angola	58.92	
58	1	4	Fernando Medrano Medina	Nicaragua	1:00.91	
59	1	3	Rad Aweisat	Palestine	1:01.60	

=== Semifinals ===
==== Semifinal 1 ====
Rank	Lane	Name	Nationality	Time	Notes
1	4	Andriy Serdinov	Ukraine	51.74	Q, OR
2	3	Duje Draganja	Croatia	52.74	Q
3	2	Takashi Yamamoto	Japan	52.81	
4	6	Franck Esposito	France	52.88	
5	1	Mike Mintenko	Canada	52.89	
6	8	Helge Meeuw	Germany	52.99	
7	7	James Hickman	Great Britain	53.10	
8	5	Milorad Čavić	Serbia and Montenegro	53.12	

==== Semifinal 2 ====
Rank	Lane	Name	Nationality	Time	Notes
1	5	Michael Phelps	United States	51.61	Q, OR
2	4	Ian Crocker	United States	51.83	Q
3	2	Igor Marchenko	Russia	52.32	Q
4	7	Gabriel Mangabeira	Brazil	52.33	Q
5	3	Geoff Huegill	Australia	52.64	Q
6	6	Thomas Rupprath	Germany	52.71	Q
7	1	Yevgeny Korotyshkin	Russia	52.85	
8	8	Corney Swanepoel	New Zealand	52.99	

=== Final ===
Rank	Lane	Name	Nationality	Time	Notes
1st place, gold medalist(s)	4	Michael Phelps	United States	51.25	OR
2nd place, silver medalist(s)	3	Ian Crocker	United States	51.29	
3rd place, bronze medalist(s)	5	Andriy Serdinov	Ukraine	51.36	EU
4	1	Thomas Rupprath	Germany	52.27	
5	6	Igor Marchenko	Russia	52.32	
6	2	Gabriel Mangabeira	Brazil	52.34	
7	8	Duje Draganja	Croatia	52.46	
8	7	Geoff Huegill	Australia	52.56	
