= Swimming at the 2004 Summer Olympics – Men's 200 metre butterfly =

Men's 200 metre butterfly at the Games of the XXVIII Olympiad
- Venue: Olympic Aquatic Centre
- Date: August 16, 2004 (heats & semifinals); August 17, 2004 (final)
- Competitors: 39 from 34 nations
- Winning time: 1:54.04 OR

Medalists
1st place, gold medalist(s)		Michael Phelps	United States
2nd place, silver medalist(s)		Takashi Yamamoto	Japan
3rd place, bronze medalist(s)		Stephen Parry	Great Britain

The men's 200 metre butterfly event at the 2004 Olympic Games was contested at the Olympic Aquatic Centre of the Athens Olympic Sports Complex in Athens, Greece on August 16 and 17.

After finishing fifth in Sydney four years earlier, U.S. swimmer Michael Phelps added a second gold to his collection. He touched the wall first in 1:54.04, just 0.11 of a second under his own world record. Japan's Takashi Yamamoto earned a silver medal in an Asian record of 1:54.56. Stephen Parry ended Great Britain's 8-year medal drought with a bronze in 1:55.52. Parry also put his teammate Melanie Marshall on the spot to fulfill her promise of shaving her head if the Brits won a single swimming medal in Athens.

Meanwhile, Poland's Paweł Korzeniowski pulled off a fourth-place effort in a national record of 1:56.00. Defending Olympic champion Tom Malchow rounded out the final to eighth place in 1:57.48, matching his semifinal time in the process.

Other notable swimmers missed the top 8 final, featuring Denys Sylantyev (Ukraine), Justin Norris (Australia), Franck Esposito (France), and Anatoly Polyakov (Russia).

== Records ==
Prior to this competition, the existing world and Olympic records were as follows.

World record	Michael Phelps (USA)	1:53.93	Barcelona, Spain	22 July 2003
Olympic record	Tom Malchow (USA)	1:55.35	Sydney, Australia	19 September 2000

The following new world and Olympic records were set during this competition.

Date	Event	Name	Nationality	Time	Record
August 17	Final	Michael Phelps	United States	1:54.04	OR

== Results ==
=== Heats ===
Rank	Heat	Lane	Name	Nationality	Time	Notes
1	4	3	Takashi Yamamoto	Japan	1:57.36	Q
1	5	4	Michael Phelps	United States	1:57.36	Q
3	5	5	Paweł Korzeniowski	Poland	1:57.45	Q
4	3	4	Tom Malchow	United States	1:57.75	Q
5	3	6	Wu Peng	China	1:57.96	Q
6	5	3	Justin Norris	Australia	1:58.05	Q
7	4	4	Franck Esposito	France	1:58.12	Q
7	5	6	Ioan Gherghel	Romania	1:58.12	Q
7	4	2	Anatoly Polyakov	Russia	1:58.12	Q
10	5	1	Moss Burmester	New Zealand	1:58.13	Q
11	3	7	Nikolay Skvortsov	Russia	1:58.18	Q
12	4	5	Takeshi Matsuda	Japan	1:58.23	Q
13	5	8	Juan Veloz	Mexico	1:58.32	Q
14	3	2	Sergiy Advena	Ukraine	1:58.41	Q
15	3	3	Denys Sylantyev	Ukraine	1:58.44	Q
16	3	5	Stephen Parry	Great Britain	1:58.88	Q
17	4	6	Travis Nederpelt	Australia	1:58.93	
18	5	2	Helge Meeuw	Germany	1:58.96	
19	5	7	Kaio Almeida	Brazil	1:59.23	
20	3	1	Jeremy Knowles	Bahamas	1:59.32	
21	4	7	Ioannis Drymonakos	Greece	1:59.42	
21	3	8	Andrew Livingston	Puerto Rico	1:59.42	
23	2	4	Nathaniel O'Brien	Canada	2:00.12	
24	2	3	Jeong Doo-hee	South Korea	2:00.96	
25	4	1	Dávid Kolozár	Hungary	2:01.89	
26	2	6	Georgi Palazov	Bulgaria	2:02.15	
27	2	8	Zoran Lazarovski	Macedonia	2:02.26	
28	4	8	Juan Pablo Valdivieso	Peru	2:02.79	
29	1	4	Gastón Rodríguez	Argentina	2:04.01	
30	2	7	Paulius Andrijauskas	Lithuania	2:04.64	
31	2	5	Vladan Marković	Serbia and Montenegro	2:04.77	
32	2	2	Aghiles Slimani	Algeria	2:04.93	
33	1	3	Donny Utomo	Indonesia	2:05.71	
34	1	7	Roy Barahona	Honduras	2:05.99	
35	1	2	Sergio Cabrera	Paraguay	2:06.15	
36	2	1	Yeh Tzu-cheng	Chinese Taipei	2:06.41	
37	1	5	James Walsh	Philippines	2:06.76	
38	1	1	Bertrand Bristol	Seychelles	2:09.07	
39	1	6	Sergey Pankov	Uzbekistan	2:13.06	

=== Semifinals ===
==== Semifinal 1 ====
Rank	Lane	Name	Nationality	Time	Notes
1	8	Stephen Parry	Great Britain	1:55.57	Q
2	4	Michael Phelps	United States	1:55.65	Q
3	5	Tom Malchow	United States	1:57.48	Q
4	6	Anatoly Polyakov	Russia	1:57.58	
5	3	Justin Norris	Australia	1:57.96	
6	2	Moss Burmester	New Zealand	1:58.09	
7	1	Sergiy Advena	Ukraine	1:58.11	
8	7	Takeshi Matsuda	Japan	1:58.13	

==== Semifinal 2 ====
Rank	Lane	Name	Nationality	Time	Notes
1	5	Paweł Korzeniowski	Poland	1:56.40	Q
2	4	Takashi Yamamoto	Japan	1:56.69	Q
3	3	Wu Peng	China	1:56.81	Q
4	2	Ioan Gherghel	Romania	1:57.31	Q
5	7	Nikolay Skvortsov	Russia	1:57.37	Q
6	8	Denys Sylantyev	Ukraine	1:57.93	
7	6	Franck Esposito	France	1:59.00	
8	1	Juan Veloz	Mexico	1:59.78	

=== Final ===
Rank	Lane	Name	Nationality	Time	Notes
1st place, gold medalist(s)	5	Michael Phelps	United States	1:54.04	OR
2nd place, silver medalist(s)	6	Takashi Yamamoto	Japan	1:54.56	AS
3rd place, bronze medalist(s)	4	Stephen Parry	Great Britain	1:55.52	
4	3	Paweł Korzeniowski	Poland	1:56.00	NR
5	7	Ioan Gherghel	Romania	1:56.10	
6	2	Wu Peng	China	1:56.28	
7	1	Nikolay Skvortsov	Russia	1:57.14	
8	8	Tom Malchow	United States	1:57.48	
