= Swimming at the 2003 World Aquatics Championships – Men's 4 × 100 metre medley relay =

Men's 4×100m Medley Relay at the 2003 FINA World Aquatics Championships
- Dates: 27 July (prelims; final)
- Winning time: 3 minutes 31.54 seconds

Medalists
gold medal	USA
silver medal	Russia
bronze medal	Japan

The Men's 4×100 Medley Relay event at the 10th FINA World Aquatics Championships swam on 27 July 2003 at the Palau Sant Jordi in Barcelona, Spain. Preliminary heats swam during the day's morning session, with the top-8 teams advancing to swim again in a Final heat in the day's evening session.

At the start of the event, the existing World (WR) and Championship (CR) records were:

- WR: 3:33.48 swum by the USA on August 29, 2002, in Yokohama, Japan
- CR: 3:35.35 swum by Australia on July 28, 2001, in Fukuoka, Japan

== Results ==
=== Final ===
Rank	Lane	Nation	Swimmers	Time	Notes
1	4	USA	Aaron Peirsol (53.71); Brendan Hansen (59.61); Ian Crocker (50.39); Jason Lezak (47.83)	3:31.54	WR
2	6	Russia	Arkady Vyatchanin (54.87); Roman Ivanovski (1:00.18); Igor Marchenko (51.72); Alexander Popov (47.95)	3:34.72	
3	5	Japan	Tomomi Morita (54.93); Kosuke Kitajima (59.11); Takashi Yamamoto (52.24); Daisuke Hosokawa (49.84)	3:36.12	
4	3	France	Simon Dufour (55.53); Hugues Duboscq (1:00.12); Franck Esposito (52.04); Frédérick Bousquet (48.70)	3:36.39	
5	7	Netherlands	Klaas-Erik Zwering (56.56); Thijs van Valkengoed (1:01.67); Joris Keizer (52.19); Pieter van den Hoogenband (46.70)	3:37.12	
6	2	Ukraine	Volodymyr Nikolaychuk (55.95); Oleg Lisogor (1:00.35); Andriy Serdinov (51.30); Vyacheslav Shyrshov (49.68)	3:37.28	
7	1	Canada	Riley Janes (55.39); Morgan Knabe (1:01.04); Mike Mintenko (52.23); Brent Hayden (49.28)	3:37.94	
8	8	Great Britain	Gregor Tait (55.40); James Gibson (59.80); Todd Cooper (53.91); Chris Cozens (49.10)	3:38.21	

=== Preliminaries ===
Rank	Heat/Lane	Nation	Swimmers	Time	Notes
1	H4 L4	United States	Randall Bal, Ed Moses; Michael Phelps, Neil Walker	3:34.80	q, CR
2	H4 L3	Japan	Tomomi Morita, Kosuke Kitajima; Takashi Yamamoto, Daisuke Hosokawa	3:37.08	q
3	H3 L3	France	Simon Dufour, Hugues Duboscq; Franck Esposito, Frédérick Bousquet	3:37.57	q
4	H2 L4	Russia	Evgueni Alechine, Dmitry Komornikov; Evgueni Korotychkine, Denis Pimankov	3:38.14	q
5	H3 L5	Ukraine	Volodymyr Nikolaychuk, Oleg Lisogor; Andrii Serdinov, Vyacheslav Shyrshov	3:38.50	q
6	H4 L1	Netherlands	Klaas Erik Zwering, Thijs van Valkengoed; Joris Keizer, Pieter van den Hoogenband	3:38.81	q
7	H2 L3	Canada	Riley Janes, Morgan Knabe; Mike Mintenko, Brent Hayden	3:39.41	q
8	H4 L6	Great Britain	Gregor Tait, James Gibson; Todd Cooper, Chris Cozens	3:39.80	q
9	H2 L5	Hungary	Péter Horváth, Károly Güttler; Zsolt Gáspár, Attila Zubor	3:39.83	
10	H4 L7	Slovenia	Blaž Medvešek, Emil Tahirovič; Peter Mankoč, Jernej Godec	3:40.79	
11	H4 L5	Germany	Toni Helbig, Mark Warnecke; Johannes Dietrich, Torsten Spanneberg	3:41.33	
12	H2 L6	Finland	Jani Sievinen, Jarno Pihlava; Tero Välimaa, Matti Rajakylä	3:41.49	
13	H3 L6	Sweden	Jens Petersson, Martin Gustavsson; Lars Frölander, Stefan Nystrand	3:42.63	
14	H4 L8	Lithuania	Darius Grigalionis, Vytautas Janušaitis; Rimvydas Šalčius, Paulius Viktoravičius	3:43.63	
15	H4 L2	Croatia	Gordan Kožulj, Vanja Rogulj; Krešimir Čač, Igor Čerenšek	3:43.73	
16	H3 L2	China	Ouyang Kunpeng, Haibo Wang; Hao Jin, Zuo Chen	3:43.80	
17	H2 L2	Brazil	Paulo Machado, Eduardo Fischer; Kaio Almeida, Gustavo Borges	3:44.61	
18	H3 L7	Switzerland	Karel Novy, Remo Lutolf; Philipp Gilgen, Dominik Meichtry	3:45.76	
19	H1 L4	Estonia	Martin Viilep, Vladimir Labzin; Ken Tomson, Danil Haustov	3:52.49	
20	H3 L8	Hong Kong	Yau Sun Fai, Chi Kin Tam; Shui Ki Szeto, Kin Lun Doo	3:57.51	
21	H1 L3	Macau	Chi Lon Lei, Chan Wai Ma; Wing Cheung Victor Wong, Kuan Fong Lao	4:04.45	
22	H1 L6	Nigeria	Olufolahan Oluwole, Eric Williams; Musa Bakare, Gentle Offoin	4:09.17	
-	H2 L1	South Africa	Gerhard Zandberg, Chris Stewart; Roland Schoeman, Ryk Neethling	DQ	
-	H3 L4	Australia	Josh Watson, Jim Piper; Adam Pine, Ian Thorpe	DQ	
-	H3 L1	Algeria	Raouf Benabid, Sofiane Daid; Aghiles Slimani, Salim Iles	DQ	
-	-	Italy		DNS	
-	-	Uzbekistan		DNS	
-	-	Cote d'Ivoire		DNS	
