= Rad Aweisat =

Palestinian swimmer

Personal information
- Full name: Rad Aweisat
- National team: Palestine
- Born: 27 October 1986 (age 39)
- Height: 1.70 m (5 ft 7 in)
- Weight: 70 kg (154 lb)

Sport
- Sport: Swimming
- Strokes: Butterfly

Rad Aweisat (Arabic: رعد عويسات; born October 27, 1986) is a Palestinian swimmer, who specialized in butterfly events. Aweisat qualified for the men's 100 m butterfly, as Palestine's youngest athlete (aged 17), at the 2004 Summer Olympics in Athens. He received a Universality place from FINA as part of his Olympic Solidarity program, without meeting an entry time. He participated in heat one against two other swimmers Luis Matias of Angola and Fernando Medrano of Nicaragua. He rounded out a small field of three to last place with a slowest time of 1:01.60, nearly 11 seconds off the world record set by U.S. swimmer Ian Crocker. Aweisat failed to advance into the semifinals, as he placed fifty-ninth overall in the preliminaries.
