= Onur Uras =

Turkish swimmer

Personal information
- Full name: Onur Uras
- National team: Turkey
- Born: 1 January 1985 (age 41) Istanbul, Turkey
- Height: 1.87 m (6 ft 2 in)
- Weight: 82 kg (181 lb)

Sport
- Sport: Swimming
- Strokes: Butterfly
- Club: Galatasaray Spor Kulübü
- College team: Georgia Institute of Technology (U.S.)
- Coach: Yilmaz Ozuak

Onur Uras (born January 1, 1985) is a Turkish Olympic swimmer who specialized in the butterfly stroke. He is a four-time Turkish national champion, and a member of Galatasaray Swimming Club (Turkish: Galatasaray Spor Kulübü) in Istanbul, under his head coach Yilmaz Ozuak. Uras is also a former varsity swimmer for the Georgia Tech Yellow Jackets, and a graduate of industrial engineering at the Georgia Institute of Technology in Atlanta, Georgia.

== Career ==
Uras made his first Turkish team, as a 19-year-old, at the 2004 Summer Olympics in Athens, where he competed in the men's 100 m butterfly. He rounded out the third heat to last place and forty-ninth overall by 0.15 of a second behind Algeria's Aghiles Slimani in 56.37 seconds.

At the 2008 Summer Olympics in Beijing, Uras qualified again for the men's 100 m butterfly, by establishing a Turkish record and clearing a FINA B-standard entry time of 53.97 from the Speedo Champion Series in Atlanta. He challenged seven other swimmers on the same heat, including three-time Olympians Jeremy Knowles of the Bahamas, Georgi Palazov of Bulgaria, and Camilo Becerra of Colombia. He edged out Palazov to take a seventh spot by 0.46 of a second in 54.79. Uras failed to advance into the semifinals, as he placed fifty-eighth overall in the preliminaries.
