= 1999 Pan Pacific Swimming Championships – Men's 100 metre butterfly =

Men's 100 metre butterfly at the 1999 Pan Pacific Swimming Championships
- Venue: Sydney International Aquatic Centre
- Dates: August 27, 1999 (heats & semifinals); August 28, 1999 (final)
- Competitors: 28 from 8 nations
- Winning time: 52.49

Medalists
gold medal	Michael Klim	Australia
silver medal	Geoff Huegill	Australia
bronze medal	Takashi Yamamoto	Japan

The men's 100 metre butterfly competition at the 1999 Pan Pacific Swimming Championships took place on August 27–28 at the Sydney International Aquatic Centre. The last champion was Neil Walker of US.

This race consisted of two lengths of the pool, all in butterfly.

== Records ==
Prior to this competition, the existing world and Pan Pacific records were as follows:

World record	Michael Klim (AUS)	52.15	Brisbane, Australia	October 9, 1997
Pan Pacific Championships record	Neil Walker (USA)	52.76	Fukuoka, Japan	August 12, 1997

== Results ==
All times are in minutes and seconds.

KEY:	q	Fastest non-qualifiers	Q	Qualified	CR	Championships record	NR	National record	PB	Personal best	SB	Seasonal best

=== Heats ===
The first round was held on August 27.

Rank	Name	Nationality	Time	Notes
1	Geoff Huegill	Australia	52.86	Q
2	Scott Miller	Australia	53.34	Q
3	Takashi Yamamoto	Japan	53.64	Q
4	Michael Klim	Australia	53.72	Q
5	Theo Verster	South Africa	53.86	Q
6	Dod Wales	United States	54.01	Q
7	Bryan Jones	United States	54.10	Q
8	Brock Newman	United States	54.37	Q
9	Mike Mintenko	Canada	54.41	Q
10	Shamek Pietucha	Canada	54.56	Q
11	Bill Kirby	Australia	54.62	Q
12	Ryan Kelly	South Africa	54.89	Q
13	Justin Norris	Australia	54.93	
14	Adam Sioui	Canada	55.08	Q
15	Douglas Browne	Canada	55.58	Q
16	Colin Sood	Canada	55.59	
17	Uğur Taner	United States	55.81	
18	Ian Crocker	United States	55.83	Q
19	Ryo Takayasu	Japan	55.91	Q
20	Joseph Marus	United States	56.18	
21	Han Kyu-Chul	South Korea	56.21	
22	Hisayoshi Tanaka	Japan	56.24	
23	Nicholas Sheeran	New Zealand	56.28	
23	Greg Shaw	Australia	56.28	
25	Philip Weiss	Canada	56.75	
26	Dean Kent	New Zealand	57.80	
27	Tseng Cheng-hua	Chinese Taipei	58.16	
28	Merlin Fredericks	South Africa	1:02.00	

=== Semifinals ===
The semifinals were held on August 27.

Rank	Name	Nationality	Time	Notes
1	Geoff Huegill	Australia	52.45	Q, CR
2	Michael Klim	Australia	52.76	Q
3	Scott Miller	Australia	53.01	
4	Takashi Yamamoto	Japan	53.14	Q
5	Dod Wales	United States	53.73	Q
6	Brock Newman	United States	53.94	Q
7	Mike Mintenko	Canada	53.97	Q
8	Bryan Jones	United States	54.18	
9	Ian Crocker	United States	54.31	
10	Theo Verster	South Africa	54.34	Q
11	Bill Kirby	Australia	54.52	
12	Ryan Kelly	South Africa	55.03	Q
13	Ryo Takayasu	Japan	55.08	
14	Adam Sioui	Canada	55.15	
15	Shamek Pietucha	Canada	55.40	
16	Douglas Browne	Canada	55.88	

=== Final ===
The final was held on August 28.

Rank	Lane	Nationality	Time	Notes
1st place, gold medalist(s)	Michael Klim	Australia	52.49	
2nd place, silver medalist(s)	Geoff Huegill	Australia	52.51	
3rd place, bronze medalist(s)	Takashi Yamamoto	Japan	52.93	
4	Dod Wales	United States	53.38	
5	Brock Newman	United States	53.86	
6	Mike Mintenko	Canada	54.01	
7	Theo Verster	South Africa	54.28	
8	Ryan Kelly	South Africa	54.34	
