= Yeh Tzu-cheng =

Taiwanese swimmer

Personal information
- Full name: Yeh Tzu-cheng
- National team: Chinese Taipei
- Born: 22 November 1987 (age 38) Taipei, Taiwan
- Height: 1.78 m (5 ft 10 in)
- Weight: 64 kg (141 lb)

Sport
- Sport: Swimming
- Strokes: Butterfly

Yeh Tzu-cheng (Chinese: 葉子誠; pinyin: Yè Zichéng; born 22 November 1987) is a Taiwanese swimmer, who specialized in butterfly events. Yeh qualified for the men's 200 m butterfly at the 2004 Summer Olympics in Athens, by posting a FINA B-standard entry time of 2:03.28 from the National University Games in Taipei. He challenged seven other swimmers in heat two, including four-time Olympian Vladan Marković of Serbia and Montenegro. He rounded out the field to last place by a 6.39-second margin behind winner Nathaniel O'Brien of Canada in 2:06.41. Yeh failed to advance into the semifinals, as he placed thirty-sixth overall in the preliminaries.
