= Dmitry Tsutskarev =

Uzbekistani swimmer (born 1976)

Dmitriy Tsutskarev
Personal information
- Full name: Dmitriy Tsutskarev
- Nationality: Uzbekistan
- Born: 1 January 1976 (age 50) Tashkent, Uzbek SSR, Soviet Union
- Height: 1.83 m (6 ft 0 in)
- Weight: 83 kg (183 lb)

Sport
- Sport: Swimming
- Strokes: Butterfly

Dmitriy Tsutskarev (Uzbek: Дмитрий Цуцкарев; born January 1, 1976) is an Uzbek former swimmer, who specialized in butterfly events. Tsutskarev competed only in the men's 200 m butterfly at the 2000 Summer Olympics in Sydney. He achieved a FINA B-cut of 2:05.60 from the Kazakhstan Open Championships in Almaty. He challenged five other swimmers in heat one, including Ecuador's two-time Olympian Roberto Delgado. He edged out Syria's Fadi Kouzmah to race for the fifth seed by 1.02 seconds in 2:10.54. Tsustkarev failed to advance into the semifinals, as he placed forty-fifth overall in the prelims.
