= Fernando Medrano (swimmer) =

Nicaraguan swimmer (born 1988)

Personal information
- Full name: Fernando Medrano Medina
- National team: Nicaragua
- Born: 14 May 1988 (age 38)
- Height: 1.85 m (6 ft 1 in)
- Weight: 75 kg (165 lb)

Sport
- Sport: Swimming
- Strokes: Butterfly

Fernando Medrano Medina (born May 14, 1988) is a Nicaraguan former swimmer, who specialized in butterfly events. Medrano qualified for the men's 100 m butterfly at the 2004 Summer Olympics in Athens, by receiving a Universality place from FINA, in an entry time of 1:00.80. He participated in heat one against two other swimmers Luis Matias of Angola and Rad Aweisat of Palestine. He raced to second place by nearly two seconds behind winner Matias in 1:00.91. Medrano failed to advance into the semifinals, as he placed fifty-eighth overall in the preliminaries.
