= Steve Parry (swimmer) =

English swimmer

Steve Parry MBE
Medal record

Men's swimming

Representing Great Britain

Olympic Games
Bronze medal – third place	2004 Athens	200 m butterfly

European Championships (LC)
Bronze medal – third place	1997 Seville	200 m butterfly

European Championships (SC)
Gold medal – first place	2002 Riesa	200 m butterfly
Silver medal – second place	2002 Riesa	200 m backstroke
Silver medal – second place	2003 Dublin	200 m butterfly
Bronze medal – third place	2000 Valencia	200 m butterfly
Bronze medal – third place	2000 Valencia	4×50 m freestyle

Commonwealth Games

Representing England
Silver medal – second place	2002 Manchester	200 m butterfly
Bronze medal – third place	1998 Kuala Lumpur	200 m butterfly
Bronze medal – third place	2002 Manchester	4×200 m freestyle

Stephen Benjamin Parry (born 2 March 1977) is an English former competitive swimmer who represented Great Britain in the Olympics, FINA world championships and European championships, and England in the Commonwealth Games. He competed internationally in 100-metre and 200-metre butterfly events.

== Career ==
After joining Stockport Metro, he set a Commonwealth record at the 2000 US Nationals in Seattle, beating, among others, a very young Michael Phelps. Later that year, he qualified for his first Olympic Games in Sydney.

Four years later, in Athens, Greece, Parry won Britain's first Olympic swimming medal in eight years at the Athens Summer Olympics in 200-metres butterfly, being beaten by Michael Phelps and Takashi Yamamoto. Phelps had beaten him into 4th place at Sydney four years earlier. Parry retired from competitive swimming in 2005.

He represented England and won a bronze medal in the 200 metres butterfly event, at the 1998 Commonwealth Games in Kuala Lumpur, Malaysia. Four years later he won a silver and bronze medal in the butterfly and relay events at the 2002 Commonwealth Games.

At the ASA National British Championships he won the 100 metres butterfly title in 1997 and was an eight-time winner of the 200 metres butterfly title in 1995, 1996, 1997, 2000, 2001, 2002, 2003, and 2004.

After retiring, Parry joined up with former training partner Adrian Turner and Rebecca Adlington to establish Total Swimming, a swimming training program and facilities for young people. In June 2022, JD Sports announced they had purchased 60% of Total swimming group, after the group had made £8.6 million at the end of the 2021 fiscal year. JD purchased the stock with an initial cash consideration of £11.1 million with a maximum of £4 million.

He briefly hosted his own Sunday afternoon programme on BBC Radio Merseyside before joining BBC Sport as part of their team covering the swimming at the 2008 Beijing Olympics.

== Personal life ==
Parry was diagnosed with testicular cancer in 2009, days after marrying his wife Thea. The affected testicle was removed before the cancer spread, and in early 2012 he became a father.

Parry was appointed Member of the Order of the British Empire (MBE) in the 2022 New Year Honours for services to swimming.

== Personal bests and records ==
Event	Long course	Short course
200 m freestyle	1.50.92	1.48.39
100 m backstroke		53.15
200 m backstroke		1.54.11
100 m butterfly	53.80	52.53
200 m butterfly	1:55.52 ^{NR}	1.52.91
Key NR:British

== See also ==
- List of Commonwealth Games medallists in swimming (men)
- List of Olympic medalists in swimming (men)
