= Nathaniel O'Brien =

Canadian swimmer

Personal information
- Full name: Nathaniel O'Brien
- National team: Canada
- Born: March 3, 1983 (age 43) Bellevue, Washington
- Height: 1.87 m (6 ft 2 in)
- Weight: 86 kg (190 lb)

Sport
- Sport: Swimming
- Strokes: Backstroke, butterfly
- Club: Olympic Cascade Aquatics (OCA)
- College team: University of Texas

Nathaniel O'Brien (born March 3, 1983) is a Canadian competition swimmer who specialized in backstroke and butterfly events. He is a two-time national championship titleholder, and also, a member of the Pacific Coast Swimming Club in Victoria, British Columbia, under head coach and former Olympic swimmer Ron Jacks. O'Brien is the son of former swimmer Lisa Geary, who competed for the host nation Canada, and placed tenth in the women's 800-metre freestyle at the 1976 Summer Olympics in Montreal.

Representing his adopted nation Canada, O'Brien qualified for the men's 200-metre backstroke at the 2004 Summer Olympics in Athens, by attaining an A-standard time of 1:59.17 and beating national record holder Keith Beavers from the Olympic trials. O'Brien advanced to the semifinals from the morning's preliminary heats, with a qualified entry time of 2:00.49; however, he fell short in his bid for the final, as he emulated his mother's luck in tenth place, finishing the first semi-final at 2:00.13. In the men's 200-metre butterfly, O'Brien won the second heat by less than sixteen hundredths of a second (0.84) ahead of South Korea's Jeong Doo-Hee, with a time of 2:00.12. O'Brien, however, failed to advance into the semi-finals, as he placed twenty-third out of thirty-nine swimmers in the overall rankings.

O'Brien was also a member of the Texas Longhorns swimming and diving team, and is a graduate of politics and governance at the University of Texas in Austin, Texas.

He began swimming as a freshman at Eastlake High School and did not begin year round competitive swimming until his sophomore year of high school with Bellevue Club Swim Team.

He was former head coach in the Bellevue, Washington area for Bellevue Club Swim Team (BCST) and currently coaches at Olympic Cascade Aquatics (OCA) in Mercer Island, Washington.
