= Dávid Kolozár =

Hungarian swimmer (born 1981)

Personal information
- Full name: Dávid Kolozár
- National team: Hungary
- Born: 3 August 1981 (age 45) Budapest, Hungary
- Height: 1.81 m (5 ft 11 in)
- Weight: 73 kg (161 lb)

Sport
- Sport: Swimming
- Strokes: Butterfly
- Club: Delfin Lászlovill SC
- College team: Arizona State University (U.S.)

Dávid Kolozár (born August 3, 1981) is a Hungarian former swimmer who specialized in butterfly events. He is a former varsity swimmer for the Arizona State Sun Devils, and a graduate of tourism and business at the Arizona State University in Tempe, Arizona.

Kolozar qualified for the men's 200 m butterfly at the 2004 Summer Olympics in Athens, by clearing a FINA B-standard entry time of 1:58.99 from the national championships in Székesfehérvár. He challenged seven other swimmers on the fourth heat, including Olympic veterans Takashi Yamamoto of Japan and Franck Esposito of France. He edged out Peru's Juan Pablo Valdivieso to take a seventh spot by less than 0.10 of a second in 2:01.89. Kolozar failed to advance into the semifinals, as he placed twenty-fifth overall in the preliminaries.
