= Ewout Holst =

Dutch swimmer (born 1978)

Personal information
- Full name: Ewout Holst
- Nickname: Wouty
- Nationality: Netherlands
- Born: 8 October 1978 (age 47) The Hague, South Holland, Netherlands

Sport
- Sport: Swimming
- Strokes: freestyle and butterfly
Medal record
Men's swimming
Representing the Netherlands
European Championships (SC)
Gold medal – first place	2002 Riesa	4×50 m freestyle

Ewout Holst (born 8 October 1978 in The Hague, South Holland, Netherlands) is a Dutch former freestyle and butterfly swimmer.

Holst's early years were spent abroad, travelling with his family to the various postings his father was given as a government official. It was whilst at school in Bonn that his skills as a swimmer became recognised.

He gained his first selection for the Dutch Team for the 1998 European Short Course Swimming Championships in Sheffield. He was disqualified in the heats of the 4 × 100 m freestyle relay at the 2000 Summer Olympics in Sydney, Australia. After a troubled period he decided to quit swimming after coming seventh in the 50 metres butterfly at the 2004 European Aquatics Championships in Madrid, Spain.

== Personal best times ==
	Short Course	Long Course
50m Butterfly	23.77 (2001)	23.91 (2001)
100m Butterfly	55.21 (2001)	54.69 (2002)
50m Freestyle	22.30 (2000)	22.91 (2000)
100m Freestyle	49.38 (2000)	50.50 (2000)
