= Roy Barahona =

Honduran swimmer (born 1986)

Personal information
- Full name: Roy Felipe Barahona Fuentes
- National team: Honduras
- Born: 20 March 1986 (age 40)
- Height: 1.73 m (5 ft 8 in)
- Weight: 65 kg (143 lb)

Sport
- Sport: Swimming
- Strokes: Butterfly

Roy Felipe Barahona Fuentes (born March 20, 1986) is a Honduran swimmer, who specialized in butterfly events. Barahona qualified for the men's 200 m butterfly at the 2004 Summer Olympics in Athens, by receiving a Universality place from FINA, in an entry time of 2:06.14. He challenged six other swimmers in heat one, including 15-year-old Sergey Pankov of Uzbekistan. He set a lifetime best of 2:05.99 to pull off a third-place finish by 0.28 of a second behind Indonesia's Donny Utomo. Barahona failed to advance into the semifinals, as he placed thirty-fourth overall in the preliminaries.
