= Ian Crocker =

American swimmer (born 1982)

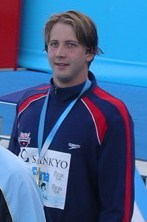
- Crocker in 2005

Personal information
- Full name: Ian Lowell Crocker
- National team: United States
- Born: August 31, 1982 (age 44) Portland, Maine, U.S.
- Height: 6 ft 4 in (1.93 m)
- Weight: 190 lb (86 kg)

Sport
- Sport: Swimming
- Strokes: Butterfly, freestyle
- Club: Portland Porpoises
- College team: University of Texas
Medal record
Men's swimming
Representing the United States
| Event | 1st | 2nd | 3rd |
|---|---|---|---|
| Olympic Games | 3 | 1 | 1 |
| World Championships (LC) | 4 | 5 | 0 |
| World Championships (SC) | 4 | 0 | 0 |
| Pan Pacific Championships | 3 | 0 | 0 |
| Total | 14 | 6 | 1 |
Olympic Games
| Gold medal – first place | 2000 Sydney | 4×100 m medley |
| Gold medal – first place | 2004 Athens | 4×100 m medley |
| Gold medal – first place | 2008 Beijing | 4×100 m medley |
| Silver medal – second place | 2004 Athens | 100 m butterfly |
| Bronze medal – third place | 2004 Athens | 4×100 m freestyle |
World Championships (LC)
| Gold medal – first place | 2003 Barcelona | 100 m butterfly |
| Gold medal – first place | 2003 Barcelona | 4×100 metre medley |
| Gold medal – first place | 2005 Montreal | 100 metre butterfly |
| Gold medal – first place | 2005 Montreal | 4×100 metre medley |
| Silver medal – second place | 2001 Fukuoka | 100 metre butterfly |
| Silver medal – second place | 2003 Barcelona | 50 metre butterfly |
| Silver medal – second place | 2005 Montreal | 50 metre butterfly |
| Silver medal – second place | 2007 Melbourne | 50 metre butterfly |
| Silver medal – second place | 2007 Melbourne | 100 metre butterfly |
World Championships (SC)
| Gold medal – first place | 2004 Indianapolis | 50 metre butterfly |
| Gold medal – first place | 2004 Indianapolis | 100 m butterfly |
| Gold medal – first place | 2004 Indianapolis | 4×100 metre freestyle |
| Gold medal – first place | 2004 Indianapolis | 4×100 metre medley |
Pan Pacific Championships
| Gold medal – first place | 2002 Yokohama | 100 metre butterfly |
| Gold medal – first place | 2006 Victoria | 100 m butterfly |
| Gold medal – first place | 2006 Victoria | 4×100 m medley |

Ian Lowell Crocker (born August 31, 1982) is an American former competition swimmer, five-time Olympic medalist, and former world record-holder. During his career, he set world records in the 50- and 100-meter butterfly (long course and short course) and the 100-meter freestyle (short course). He has won a total of twenty-one medals in major international competition, spanning the Olympics, the FINA World Aquatics Championships, and the Pan Pacific Swimming Championships. He coached for many years at the Western Hills Athletic Club and has helped coach the Longhorns swim camp in 2019 as well as other years. Since Spring of 2022 when the new facility opened, Crocker coaches at the Western Aquatics and Social Club at the Eanes Independent School District Aquatics center.

== Career ==
Crocker, who specializes in the butterfly, has received five Olympic medals in his career. In addition to his accomplishments at the Olympics, Crocker was the first man to ever swim under 51 seconds in the 100-meter butterfly. Crocker improved his world record of 50.98 twice, down to a time of 50.40 set at the 2005 World Aquatics Championships in Montreal, before being bested by Michael Phelps in 2009.

=== 2000-2001 ===
At the 2000 Summer Olympics in Sydney, Crocker was a member of the gold medal-winning 4x100-meter medley relay team and barely missed winning a bronze in the 100-meter butterfly.

At the 2001 World Aquatics Championships, Crocker won a silver medal in the 100-meter butterfly, finishing behind Lars Frölander.

=== 2003 World Aquatics Championships ===
At the 2003 World Aquatics Championships, Crocker won a total of three medals, two golds and one silver medal. In his first event, the 50-meter butterfly, Crocker won a silver medal finishing behind Australian Matt Welsh, who set the world record. Crocker is best known in these Championships for his world record performance in the 100 m butterfly final. After the semi-finals of the 100-meter butterfly, it seemed Crocker was out of the gold medal position after Andrii Serdinov and Michael Phelps went under the former world record. However, in the final of the 100-meter butterfly, Crocker swam a 50.98 to become the first man under 51 seconds and win the gold medal. When Crocker saw the time after the race, he thought the world record belonged to Phelps. Crocker earned his final medal, a gold, in the 4×100-meter medley relay. The American team recorded a time of 3:31.54 to beat the former world record set in 2002.

=== 2004 Athens Summer Olympic Games ===
At the 2004 Summer Olympics in Athens, Crocker received a bronze medal as a member of the 4x100-meter freestyle relay team, a silver medal in the 100-meter butterfly, and a gold medal as a member of the world-record setting 4x100-meter medley relay team. Of the three medals he won at the 2004 Olympics, he is best remembered for his silver, as teammate Michael Phelps overtook him at the very end of the 100-meter butterfly to win the race by 0.04 seconds. Traditionally, the Olympian who places highest in an individual event will be automatically given the corresponding leg of the 4×100-meter medley relay for the finals swim. This gave Phelps an automatic entry into finals for the medley relay but he deferred that spot to the world record-holder and swam the butterfly leg in preliminary heats instead. Crocker had swum a slow leg leading off the 4×100-meter freestyle relay final, which may have cost the Americans a better medal, so Phelps' gesture gave Crocker a chance to make amends in a final. Crocker and the American medley team went on to win the event in world record time. (Phelps still received a gold, since he had swum in the preliminary heat of the medley relay.)

=== 2005 World Aquatics Championships ===
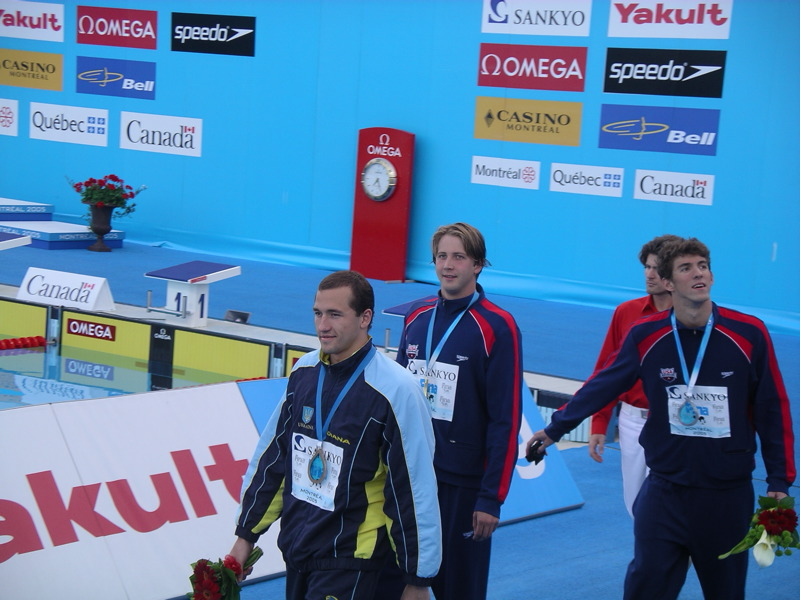
Victory lap of the 100 m butterfly during the 2005 FINA World Championships in Montréal. Crocker is in the center.

At the 2005 World Aquatics Championships, Crocker won a total of three medals, two golds and one silver medal. In his first event, the 50 m butterfly, Crocker won a silver medal finishing behind South African Roland Schoeman, who set the world record. In the final of the 100 m butterfly, Crocker recorded a time of 50.40 to beat his own world record of 50.76 and win the gold medal. Crocker also handed Michael Phelps one of the worst losses in his career when Phelps finished over a second behind. With this win, Crocker was awarded a spot in the 4 × 100 m medley relay. Crocker did not disappoint and swam the butterfly leg in 50.39. The American team went on to win the gold medal.

=== 2007 World Aquatics Championships ===
At the 2007 World Aquatics Championships, Crocker won two silver medals. In the 50-meter butterfly, Crocker won a silver medal finishing behind Schoeman. In the 100 m butterfly final, Crocker finished second to Phelps 50.82 to 50.77. In the heats of the 4×100-meter medley relay, Crocker dove in too early on an exchange, causing the disqualification of the American team.

=== 2008 Beijing Summer Olympic Games ===
Crocker competed in his third Olympics as a medal contender for his signature 100-meter butterfly. Many felt Crocker's career was on a slide due to a poor showing in the Olympic trials and having not broken the 51-second barrier in over 12 months. Crocker finished in a tie for third in the semi-finals, behind Australia's Andrew Lauterstein. In the finals, he finished fourth behind teammate Phelps, Milorad Čavić, and Lauterstein, beating Kenyan swimmer Jason Dunford. He missed the medal stand by one hundredth of a second. Despite not earning a medal in his signature event, Crocker was given the opportunity to swim for the 4×100-meter medley relay in the preliminary heats. He earned a gold medal for his contribution.

=== 2011 return to drug testing pool ===
In the third quarter of 2011, Ian Crocker returned to the USADA drug-testing pool. This fueled speculation that he might be considering a return to competitive swimming after more than three years away from the sport.

== Personal ==
Crocker attended Cheverus High School in Portland, Maine.

Following the 2008 Beijing Olympic Games, he has taken a break and started a swim school with former Longhorn teammate Neil Walker.

He is now the head coach for a swim club in Austin, Texas, called the Whitecaps of Westlake (WOW).

== See also ==
- List of multiple Olympic gold medalists
- List of multiple Olympic gold medalists in one event
- List of Olympic medalists in swimming (men)
- List of University of Texas at Austin alumni
- List of World Aquatics Championships medalists in swimming (men)
- World record progression 50 metres butterfly
- World record progression 100 metres freestyle
- World record progression 100 metres butterfly
- World record progression 4 × 100 metres medley relay

Records
| Preceded by Michael Phelps | Men's 100-meter butterfly world record-holder (long course); July 26, 2003 – July 9, 2009 | Succeeded by Michael Phelps |
| Preceded by Milorad Čavić | Men's 100-meter butterfly world record-holder (short course); March 26, 2004 – November 15, 2009 | Succeeded by Yevgeny Korotyshkin |
| Preceded by Alexander Popov; Roland Schoeman (tie) | Men's 100-meter freestyle world record-holder (short course); March 27, 2004 – January 22, 2005; January 22, 2005 – November 17, 2007 | Succeeded by Roland Schoeman (tie); Stefan Nystrand |
| Preceded by Matt Welsh | Men's 50-meter butterfly world record-holder (long course); February 29, 2004 – July 24, 2005 | Succeeded by Roland Schoeman |
| Preceded by Geoff Huegill | Men's 50-meter butterfly world record-holder (short course); October 10, 2004 – December 17, 2005 | Succeeded by Kaio de Almeida |
