= Luis Matias =

Angolan swimmer

Personal information
- Born: September 29, 1986 (age 39) Luanda, Angola

Sport
- Sport: Swimming

Luis Matias (born 29 September 1986) is an Angolan swimmer, who represented Angola at the 2004 Summer Olympics in the Men's 100 metre butterfly. While he won heat 1 with a time of 58.92, he finished in 58th place out of 60 spots and did not advance.
