= Lars Frölander =

Swedish swimmer (born 1974)

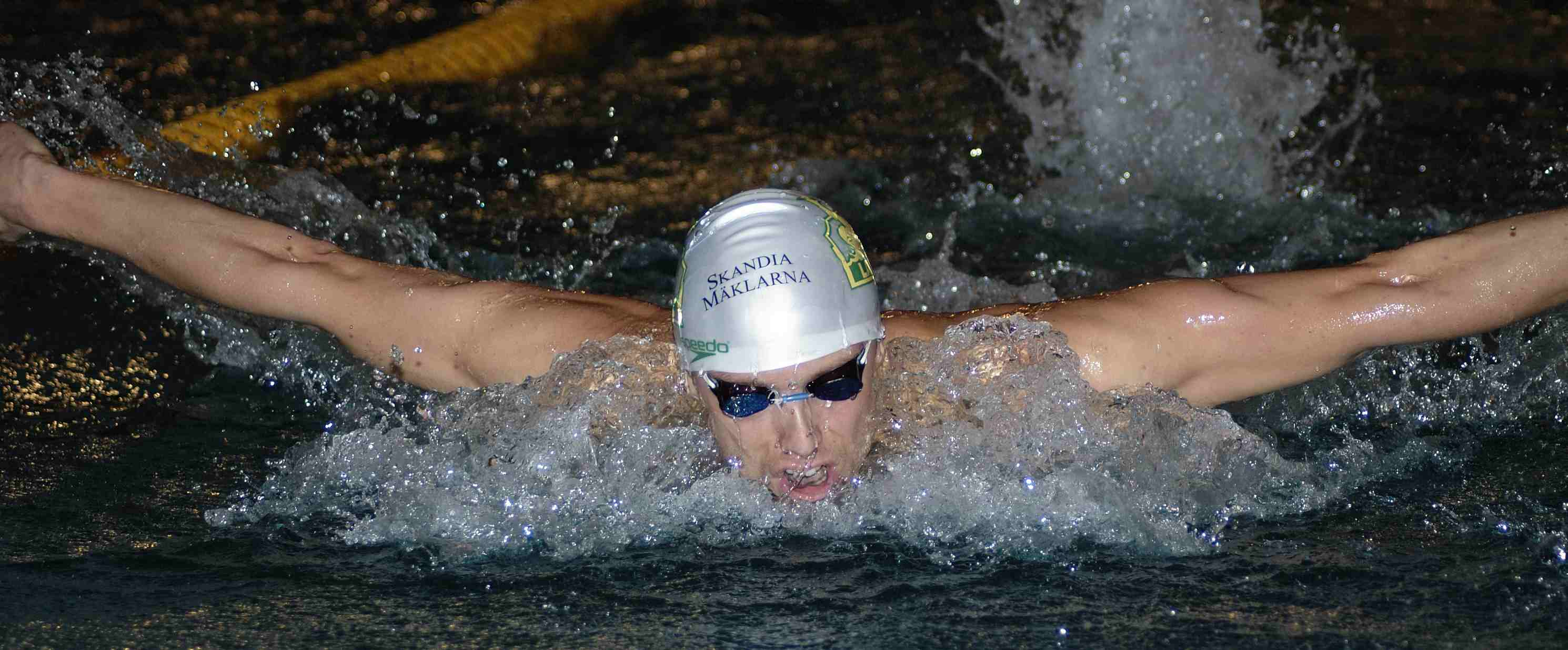
- Frölander at the 2006 Swedish Short Course Swimming Championships.

Personal information
- Full name: Lars Arne Frölander
- National team: Sweden
- Born: 26 May 1974 (age 52) Boden, Sweden

Sport
- Sport: Swimming
- Strokes: Butterfly, freestyle
- Club: Linköpings ASS
- College team: Southern Methodist University (1996–1998)
- Coach: Eddie Sinnott; SMU Mustangs
Medal record
Men's swimming
Representing Sweden
Event	1st	2nd	3rd
Olympics	1	2	0
World Championships (LC)	2	3	2
World Championships (SC)	7	5	2
European Championships (LC)	3	6	8
European Championships (SC)	9	4	3
Total	22	20	15
Olympic Games
Gold medal – first place	2000 Sydney	100 m butterfly
Silver medal – second place	1992 Barcelona	4×200 m freestyle
Silver medal – second place	1996 Atlanta	4×200 m freestyle
World Championships (LC)
Gold medal – first place	1994 Rome	4×200 m freestyle
Gold medal – first place	2001 Fukuoka	100 m butterfly
Silver medal – second place	1994 Rome	100 m butterfly
Silver medal – second place	1998 Perth	100 m butterfly
Silver medal – second place	2001 Fukuoka	50 m butterfly
Bronze medal – third place	1998 Perth	100 m freestyle
Bronze medal – third place	2001 Fukuoka	100 m freestyle
World Championships (SC)
Gold medal – first place	1993 Palma	4×200 m freestyle
Gold medal – first place	1997 Gothenburg	100 m butterfly
Gold medal – first place	1999 Hong Kong	100 m freestyle
Gold medal – first place	1999 Hong Kong	100 m butterfly
Gold medal – first place	2000 Athens	100 m freestyle
Gold medal – first place	2000 Athens	100 m butterfly
Gold medal – first place	2000 Athens	4×100 m freestyle
Silver medal – second place	1997 Gothenburg	4×100 m freestyle
Silver medal – second place	1997 Gothenburg	4×200 m freestyle
Silver medal – second place	1999 Hong Kong	4×100 m medley
Silver medal – second place	2002 Moscow	4×100 m freestyle
Silver medal – second place	2006 Shanghai	4×100 m freestyle
Bronze medal – third place	1999 Hong Kong	4×100 m freestyle
Bronze medal – third place	2008 Manchester	4×100 m freestyle
European Championships (LC)
Gold medal – first place	1997 Seville	100 m butterfly
Gold medal – first place	1999 Istanbul	100 m butterfly
Gold medal – first place	2000 Helsinki	100 m butterfly
Silver medal – second place	1993 Sheffield	4×100 m freestyle
Silver medal – second place	1995 Vienna	4×200 m freestyle
Silver medal – second place	1997 Seville	100 m freestyle
Silver medal – second place	2000 Helsinki	50 m butterfly
Silver medal – second place	2000 Helsinki	4×100 m medley
Silver medal – second place	2002 Berlin	4×100 m freestyle
Bronze medal – third place	1995 Vienna	4×100 m freestyle
Bronze medal – third place	1999 Istanbul	100 m freestyle
Bronze medal – third place	1999 Istanbul	50 m butterfly
Bronze medal – third place	1999 Istanbul	4×100 m medley
Bronze medal – third place	2000 Helsinki	100 m freestyle
Bronze medal – third place	2002 Berlin	50 m butterfly
Bronze medal – third place	2008 Eindhoven	4×100 m medley
Bronze medal – third place	2010 Budapest	4×100 m freestyle
European Championships (SC)
Gold medal – first place	1998 Sheffield	100 m freestyle
Gold medal – first place	1998 Sheffield	4×50 m medley
Gold medal – first place	1999 Lisbon	4×50 m freestyle
Gold medal – first place	1999 Lisbon	4×50 m medley
Gold medal – first place	1999 Lisbon	50 m butterfly
Gold medal – first place	1999 Lisbon	100 m butterfly
Gold medal – first place	2000 Valencia	4×50 m freestyle
Gold medal – first place	2001 Antwerp	50 m butterfly
Gold medal – first place	2005 Trieste	50 m butterfly
Silver medal – second place	1998 Sheffield	100 m butterfly
Silver medal – second place	1999 Lisbon	100 m freestyle
Silver medal – second place	2000 Valencia	100 m butterfly
Silver medal – second place	2001 Antwerp	100 m butterfly
Bronze medal – third place	1998 Sheffield	50 m butterfly
Bronze medal – third place	2001 Antwerp	4×50 m freestyle
Bronze medal – third place	2001 Antwerp	4×50 m medley

Lars Arne Frölander (born 26 May 1974) is a Swedish swimmer. He has competed in six consecutive Olympic Games (1992, 1996, 2000, 2004, 2008 and 2012).

== Biography ==
Frölander was born in Boden. He grew up in Ornäs in Borlänge Municipality.

In the 1992 Summer Olympics, he competed in the 4 × 200 metre freestyle relay along with Christer Wallin, Anders Holmertz and Tommy Werner. The Swedish team finished second behind the Unified Team.

In the 1996 Summer Olympics, Frölander again finished second in the 4 × 200 metre freestyle relay with the Swedish team. The team consisted of Christer Wallin, Anders Holmertz, Frölander, and Anders Lyrbring. This time the United States was the winning team. Frölander also competed in the 100 metre freestyle, where he finished ninth in the heats but scratched the B-final, and in the 100 metre butterfly event, where he finished 19th.

The highlight of his career was when he won the gold in the 100 metre butterfly event at the Sydney Olympic Games in September 2000. A couple of months earlier, he twice broke the world record in the men's 100 m butterfly (short course). Frölander was awarded the Svenska Dagbladet Gold Medal in 2000 as a result of his gold medal victory in Sydney.

At the 2012 Summer Olympics, Frölander, at the age of 38, posted a 52.47 in the opening heats of the 100 m butterfly, less than 1 second slower than top qualifier Chad le Clos, but 0.12 seconds too slow to advance to the semifinals.

== Personal bests ==
=== Long course (50 m) ===
Event	Time		Date	Meet	Location	Ref
50 m freestyle	22.65	(h)	18 Jul 2000	European Championships	Helsinki, Finland	
100 m freestyle	48.79		27 Jul 2001	World Championships	Fukuoka, Fukuoka, Japan	
200 m freestyle	1:50.03		13 Aug 1997	European Championships	Seville, Spain	
50 m butterfly	23.56	NR	18 Jul 2008	Swedish Championships	Norrköping, Sweden	
100 m butterfly	52.00	NR	22 Sep 2000	Olympic Games	Sydney, Australia	

Legend: WR – World record; ER – European record; NR – Swedish record;
Records not set in finals: h – heat; sf – semifinal; r – relay 1st leg; rh – relay heat 1st leg; b – B final; † – en route to final mark; so – swim-off; tt – time trial

=== Short course (25 m) ===
Event	Time		Date	Meet	Location	Ref
50 m freestyle	21.92	(r)	20 Oct 2001	Novo Nordisk Sprint Cup	East Meadow, New York, United States	
100 m freestyle	46.75		16 Mar 2000	World SC Championships	Athens, Greece	
200 m freestyle	1:45.43		16 Mar 2003	Swedish SC Championships	Stockholm, Sweden	
50 m butterfly	22.97	NR	20 Oct 2001	Novo Nordisk Sprint Cup	East Meadow, New York, United States	
100 m butterfly	50.44	NR	17 Mar 2000	World SC Championships	Athens, Greece	

Legend: WR – World record; ER – European record; NR – Swedish record;
Records not set in finals: h – heat; sf – semifinal; r – relay 1st leg; rh – relay heat 1st leg; b – B final; † – en route to final mark; so – swim-off; tt – time trial

== Clubs ==
- Borlänge SS
- Sundsvalls SS (1996–2001)
- Linköpings ASS (2001–)

Records
Preceded by Michael Klim	Men's 100-metre butterfly world record-holder (short course); 16 March 2000 – 14 December 2001	Succeeded by Thomas Rupprath
Awards
Preceded by Tony Rickardsson	Svenska Dagbladet Gold Medal; 2000	Succeeded by Per Elofsson
Sporting positions
Preceded by Pär Lindström	Swedish National LC Champion; Men's 50 m freestyle 1997–1998	Succeeded by John Miranda
Preceded by Anders Holmertz	Swedish National LC Champion; Men's 100 m freestyle 1996–1998	Succeeded by John Miranda
Preceded by John Miranda	Swedish National LC Champion; Men's 100 m freestyle 2000–2003	Succeeded by Eric la Fleur
Preceded by Jonas Persson	Swedish National LC Champion; Men's 100 m freestyle 2006	Succeeded by Petter Stymne
Preceded by Jonas Åkesson	Swedish National LC Champion; Men's 50 m butterfly 1998	Succeeded by Dan Lindström
Preceded by Daniel Carlsson	Swedish National LC Champion; Men's 50 m butterfly 2000–2007	Succeeded by
