= Geoff Huegill =

Australian swimmer (born 1979)

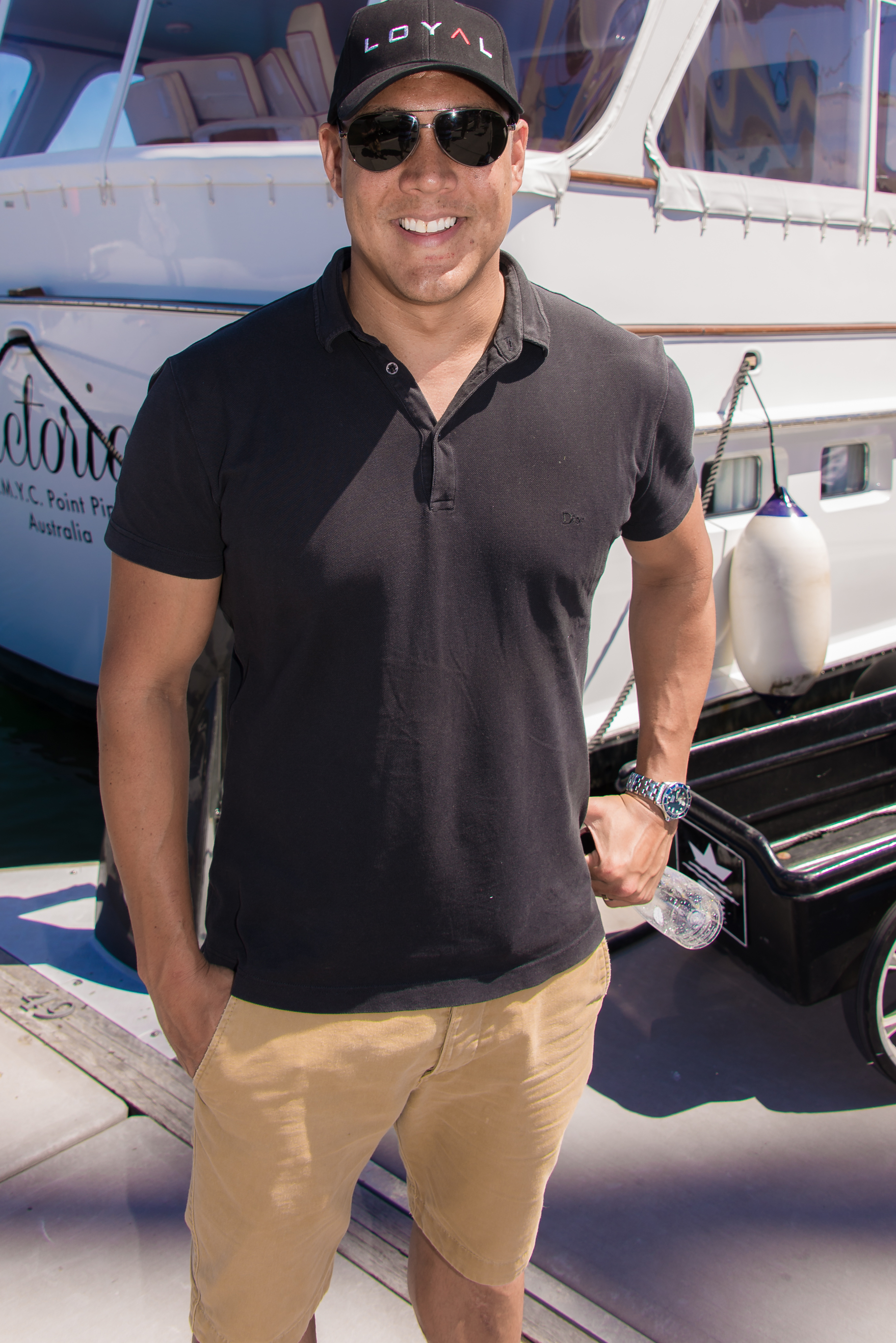
- Geoff Huegill in 2014

Personal information
- Full name: Geoffrey Andrew Huegill
- Nicknames: "Skippy", "Skip"
- National team: Australia
- Born: 4 March 1979 (age 47) Nhulunbuy, Northern Territory, Australia
- Height: 1.90 m (6 ft 3 in)
- Weight: 105 kg (231 lb)

Sport
- Sport: Swimming
- Strokes: Butterfly
- Club: List of clubs: Paradise Swimming Club; Charters Towers Swimming Club; Mackay Swimming Club; FAI Saint Bernadette; Redcliffe Leagues Lawnton Swim Club; Sydney University; Sydney Olympic Park Aquatic Centre (SOPAC); Miami Masters; Aquatic Performance Swim Club
Medal record
Men's swimming
Representing Australia
Olympic Games
Silver medal – second place	2000 Sydney	4×100 m medley
Bronze medal – third place	2000 Sydney	100 m butterfly
World Championships (LC)
Gold medal – first place	1998 Perth	4×100 m medley
Gold medal – first place	2001 Fukuoka	50 m butterfly
Gold medal – first place	2001 Fukuoka	4×100 m medley
Silver medal – second place	2011 Shanghai	4×100 m medley
Bronze medal – third place	1998 Perth	100 m butterfly
Bronze medal – third place	2001 Fukuoka	100 m butterfly
Bronze medal – third place	2011 Shanghai	50 m butterfly
World Championships (SC)
Gold medal – first place	1997 Gothenburg	4×100 m medley
Gold medal – first place	1999 Hong Kong	4×100 m medley
Gold medal – first place	2002 Moscow	50 m butterfly
Gold medal – first place	2002 Moscow	100 m butterfly
Silver medal – second place	1997 Gothenburg	100 m butterfly
Silver medal – second place	2002 Moscow	4×100 m medley
Goodwill Games
Gold medal – first place	2001 Brisbane	50 m butterfly
Gold medal – first place	2001 Brisbane	4×100 m medley
Silver medal – second place	2001 Brisbane	100 m butterfly
Pan Pacific Championships
Silver medal – second place	1999 Sydney	100 m butterfly
Silver medal – second place	2002 Yokohama	100 m butterfly
Silver medal – second place	2002 Yokohama	4×100 m medley
Bronze medal – third place	2010 Irvine	4×100 m medley
Commonwealth Games
Gold medal – first place	1998 Kuala Lumpur	100 m butterfly
Gold medal – first place	1998 Kuala Lumpur	4×100 m medley
Gold medal – first place	2002 Manchester	50 m butterfly
Gold medal – first place	2002 Manchester	100 m butterfly
Gold medal – first place	2002 Manchester	4×100 m medley
Gold medal – first place	2010 Delhi	4×100 m medley
Gold medal – first place	2010 Delhi	100 m butterfly
Silver medal – second place	2010 Delhi	50 m butterfly
Silver medal – second place	2010 Delhi	4×100 m medley
FINA World Cup
Gold medal – first place	1998 Sydney	50 m butterfly
Gold medal – first place	1998 Hong Kong	100 m backstroke
Gold medal – first place	1998 Hong Kong	50 m butterfly
Gold medal – first place	1998 Beijing	50 m butterfly
Gold medal – first place	1998 Beijing	100 m butterfly
Gold medal – first place	1998 Rio de Janeiro	100 m butterfly
Gold medal – first place	1998 Edmonton	50 m butterfly
Gold medal – first place	1998 Edmonton	100 m butterfly
Gold medal – first place	1998 College Station	50 m butterfly
Gold medal – first place	1998 College Station	100 m butterfly
Gold medal – first place	1999 Sydney	50 m butterfly
Gold medal – first place	1999 Sydney	100 m butterfly
Gold medal – first place	2001 Edmonton	50 m butterfly
Gold medal – first place	2001 Edmonton	100 m butterfly
Gold medal – first place	2001 New York	50 m butterfly
Gold medal – first place	2001 New York	100 m butterfly
Gold medal – first place	2001 Melbourne	100 m medley
Gold medal – first place	2001 Melbourne	50 m butterfly
Gold medal – first place	2001 Melbourne	100 m butterfly
Gold medal – first place	2001 Melbourne	100 m butterfly
Gold medal – first place	2002 Paris	50 m butterfly
Gold medal – first place	2002 Paris	100 m butterfly
Gold medal – first place	2002 Stockholm	50 m butterfly
Gold medal – first place	2002 Stockholm	100 m butterfly
Gold medal – first place	2002 Berlin	50 m butterfly
Gold medal – first place	2002 Melbourne	50 m butterfly
Gold medal – first place	2011 Stockholm	50 m butterfly
Gold medal – first place	2011 Moscow	50 m butterfly
Gold medal – first place	2011 Berlin	50 m butterfly
Silver medal – second place	1998 Hong Kong	100 m butterfly
Silver medal – second place	1998 Beijing	100 m backstroke
Silver medal – second place	1998 Beijing	100 m medley
Silver medal – second place	1998 Beijing	50 m backstroke
Silver medal – second place	1998 Rio de Janeiro	50 m butterfly
Silver medal – second place	1998 Edmonton	50 m backstroke
Silver medal – second place	2001 Edmonton	100 m backstroke
Silver medal – second place	2002 Berlin	100 m butterfly
Silver medal – second place	2005 Sydney	50 m butterfly
Bronze medal – third place	1998 Sydney	100 m butterfly
Bronze medal – third place	1998 Hong Kong	50 m freestyle
Bronze medal – third place	2001 New York	100 m backstroke
Bronze medal – third place	2009 Singapore	50 m butterfly
Bronze medal – third place	2009 Singapore	100 m butterfly
Bronze medal – third place	2011 Stockholm	100 m butterfly
- Education: Southern Cross Catholic College, Scarborough
- Alma mater: Central Queensland University (MSportSC (h.c))
- Occupation: Swimmer
- Spouse: Sara Hills (m. 2011; sep. 2018)
- Partner: Roxan Toll (2019–)
- Children: 4

Geoffrey Andrew Huegill (born 4 March 1979) is an Australian swimmer and dual Olympian who won seventy-two international medals, including two medals in Olympics and six world champion titles, throughout his career. He held eight world records, including 50 metres butterfly.

Huegill has been recognised as technically the best butterflier and was the dominant butterfly champion during the early 2000s.

Affectionately known as 'Skippy', he is the nation's favourite comeback kid. Huegill came out of retirement in 2008 and shed 45 kilograms of weight to fight his way back to competition and was declared a national hero when he won gold at the 2010 Delhi Commonwealth Games in the 100 metre butterfly. He won the race in 51.69 seconds and broke the Commonwealth games record and his own ten-year-old personal best time.

In 2010, he was voted Australian Sport Performer of the Year.

== Early life ==
Huegill was born on 4 March 1979 in Nhulunbuy on the Gove Peninsula in the Northern Territory. His mother, Kanthong Jum Summart, is from Chaiyaphum, Thailand while his father, Ronald Huegill, was a miner. Huegill grew up in Mackay and has an older brother, Graeme.

Huegill attended Southern Cross Catholic College in Scarborough, Queensland. In July 2013, he was awarded an honorary master's degree in sports science with high class honors from Central Queensland University.

Huegill started swimming in Mackay and showed talent from an early age. He joined coach Ken Wood’s squad on invitation, at the age of 11. After the death of his father due to a heart attack, Geoff started to live with his coach permanently.

== Career ==
=== 1996–2005 ===
In 1996, Huegill burst onto the international stage at the Mare Nostrum tour. The same year, at the age of 17, he broke the first of his many world records as part of a FINA sanctioned medley relay time trial in Melbourne, Australia.

The following year he secured his spot on the Australian team to compete at the 1997 FINA World Short Course Championships in Gothenburg, Sweden and came home with a gold and silver medal.

In 1998, Huegill competed at his first commonwealth games in Kuala Lumpur, Malaysia. He won two gold medals in the 100 meters butterfly and 4×100 meters Medley relay.

In 1999, Huegill won a silver medal in the 100 meters butterfly at the Pan Pacific Swimming Championships long course event in Sydney, Australia.

At the 2000 Australian Championships in Sydney which doubled as the Olympic qualifying trials, Huegill broke the 50 meters butterfly world record swimming a time of 23.60 seconds.

At the Sydney Olympics in 2000 Huegill broke the olympic record in the 100 meters butterfly semi-final with a time of 51.96 seconds and was the fastest qualifier leading into the finals. He placed third in the final scoring bronze with a time of 52.22 seconds. Huegill also won a silver medal in the 4×100 meters medley relay.

In 2001, at the FINA World Championships in Fukuoka, Japan the 50 meters butterfly was introduced as an inaugural event and Huegill beat his previous world record time and won gold in a time of 23.44 seconds. He also won a gold medal in the 4×100 meters medley relay and a bronze medal in the 100 meters butterfly.

At the 2002 Commonwealth Games in Manchester, United Kingdom, Huegill won gold in all three of his events, the 50 meters butterfly, the 100 meters butterfly and the 4×100 meters medley relay.

In 2002, Huegill went on to win another two gold medals in the 50 meters butterfly and 100 meters butterfly and a silver medal in the 4×100 meters medley relay at the FINA World Championships short course event in Moscow, Russia.

At the 2003 FINA World Championships long course event in Barcelona, Spain Huegill finished fourth in the 50 meters butterfly and failed to make the final of the 100 meters butterfly.

Huegill has since reflected that by 2004 he was struggling with motivation for swimming and depression. He still went on to secure his place on the Australian team for the Athens Olympic Games and raced in the 100 meters butterfly. He qualified for the final but finished in 8th place overall.

=== First retirement ===
In 2004, after the Athens Olympics, Huegill took a four months break to refocus his priorities.

Meanwhile, he started to develop interest in things outside of swimming. At the age of 25, he amicably parted with longtime coach Ken Wood and moved to Sydney to live with his model girlfriend, Nikki Giteau. While based in Sydney, Huegill became a regular part of the social scene and was often seen present at Sydney night spots.

Later, he tried to make a comeback under a new coach, Steve Alderman, at University of Sydney. At the trials for the 2006 Commonwealth Games, Huegill performed poorly, failed to make the team and announced his retirement from the sport.

=== Comeback after first retirement (2008–2012) ===
In November 2008, weighing in at 138 kilograms, Huegill decided to come back and compete in international swimming competitions. He joined the New South Wales Institute of Sport and trained in Sydney under new coach Grant Stoelwinder.

The focus of Huegill’s comeback was the 2010 Delhi Commonwealth Games. Huegill was triumphant in fighting his way back to the podium. He shed a total of 45 kilograms and won gold at the 2010 Delhi Commonwealth Games in the 100 meters butterfly. He won the race in 51.69 seconds and broke the Commonwealth games record and his own ten-year-old record personal best time. Huegill also came away with a silver medal in the 50 meters butterfly.

In 2010, he was voted Australian Sport Performer of the Year.

In 2011, at the FINA World Long Course Championships in Shanghai, China, Huegill won a silver medal in the 4×100m Medley Relay and a bronze medal in the 50m butterfly.

=== Retirement ===
In 2012, following recurring illnesses, Huegill failed to appear in the London Olympics. At the qualifying trials, in March 2012, he finished fifth in the 100m butterfly final.

Huegill announced his second retirement from swimming.

=== Outside of swimming ===
Huegill made a guest appearance in season one of Australia's Next Top Model.

In 2003, Huegill was crowned as Cleo's Bachelor of the Year after receiving the most votes from readers. Cleo editor, Paula Joye, described Huegill as "the nicest guy, totally humble about his abilities, funny and charming to be around, he's the total package." In the same year, Huegill travelled to Vietnam to record a television documentary for AusAID, the arm of the Australian government that invests in projects and provides investment assistance to developing countries.

In 2010, Huegill was a special guest presenter at the Australian Recording Industry Association 2010 ARIA Awards. Huegill was a regular guest presenter on ABC Radio's Grandstand Active Show covering sporting issues of the day, overnight scores and live crosses to sport.

A keen sailor, Huegill has placed twice in the Sydney to Hobart Yacht Race which is widely considered to be one of the most difficult yacht races in the world. In 2010, Huegill joined the celebrity crew on board Anthony Bell's 30 metre maxi yacht, Investec Loyal. The crew included seven-time world surfing champion Layne Beachley, Wallabies Phil Kearns and Phil Waugh and cricketer Mathew Hayden. They came together to raise money for the Humpty Dumpty Foundation to buy medical equipment for children's hospitals. Ivestec Loyal came in second across the line to Wild Oats.

In 2012, Huegill raced as crew aboard the 100-foot supermaxi Ragamuffin Loyal who took second place. At Constitution Dock skipper, Syd Fischer, said of Huegill, "He's bloody good. He worked hard. He didn't let up."

In October 2021, Geoff was announced as a part of the celebrity cast for 2022 SAS Australia, Season 3.

=== Businesses ===
Huegill released a capsule collection of scientifically engineered compression and performance garments. The collection was sold through luxury apparel retailers such as Stylerunner and Mode Sportif.

Huegill set up O Performance, a performance coaching and consulting business focused on delivering coaching, development programs and events in Asia. It covers all levels including; water safety, learn to swim, junior development, adult programs, squads as well as competition preparation and executive performance coaching.

=== Legal issues ===
On 26 April 2014, Huegill and his wife Sara Hills were guests at The Australian Turf Club’s Autumn Racing Carnival. They attended an event hosted by Moët & Chandon in The Stables, an exclusive lounge in the member's area of Randwick Racecourse. Police patrolling the area were directed to a suite in the grandstand by security personnel after CCTV footage showed the couple venturing into a disabled toilet. They were found to be in possession of a small quantity of cocaine and were each charged with possession of a prohibited drug.

Huegill has since explained they did not plan to do cocaine, or bring it into the grounds of the racecourse commenting, "It was just something that was there on the day. We got caught up in a moment…just a bad choice in that moment – nothing more, nothing less."

On 14 May 2014, Huegill and Hills attended Waverley Court and pleaded guilty to cocaine possession. The magistrate put the pair on a six-month good behaviour bond and recorded no criminal conviction.

=== Sponsorships, ambassadorships, and charity work ===
Huegill had a long standing association with his major sponsor, Commonwealth Bank. During his swimming career, he became a Commonwealth Bank ambassador. In 2012, after his second retirement from swimming, Huegill transitioned into an internal role at Commonwealth Bank in the corporate financial services team. He later took on a new role at the bank in corporate performance and wellbeing, rolling out programs for the bank's staff nationally.

In 2011, Huegill was named the Australian face of men’s skincare range Biotherm Homme for the French brand’s Aquapower skincare line.

Throughout his career Huegill has worked with a variety of brands through sponsorship and ambassador partnerships including; Swisse, Red Bull, Commonwealth Bank, Speedo, Foxtel, Subaru, Gatorade, Audi, Biotherm, Telstra, Thai Airways, SleepMaker, Australian Grapes, Fitness First, Bartercard.

Huegill has been the face of campaigns for DrinkWise, Black Dog Institute, and R U OK?. He has held ambassador positions with Swimming Australia, AusAID, Sydney Children’s Hospital, and the Loyal Foundation.

Huegill also chaired the NSW Premier's Council for Active Living (PCAL), an initiative that aimed to strengthen physical and social environments to enable active living.

== World records ==
Short course (25 m)

Event	Time	Date	Meet	Location	Ref
4×100 Medley Relay	3:30.91	23 Dec 1996	Australian Short Course Championships	Melbourne, Australia	
4×100 Medley Relay	3:30.66	17 Apr 1997	FINA World Championships	Gothenburg, Sweden	
50m Butterfly	22.84	7 Dec 2001	FINA World Cup Series	Melbourne, Australia	
50m Butterfly	22.84	22 Jan 2002	FINA World Cup Series	Stockholm, Sweden	
50m Butterfly	22.74	26 Jan 2002	FINA World Cup Series	Berlin, Germany	
4×100 Medley Relay	3:28.12	4 Sep 2002	Australian Short Course Championships	Melbourne, Australia	

Long course (50 m)

Event	Time	Date	Meet	Location	Ref
50m Butterfly	23.60	14 May 2000	Australia Long Course Championships	Sydney, Australia	
50m Butterfly	23:44	27 Jul 2001	FINA World Championships	Fukuoka, Japan	

== Medals ==
=== Gold medals ===
Short course (25 m)

Event	Time	Date	Meet	Location	Ref
Men 4×100m Medley Relay		17 Apr 1997	FINA World Short Course Championships	Gothenburg, Sweden	
Men 50 Butterfly		21 Jan 1998	FINA World Cup	Sydney, Australia	
Men 100 Backstroke		21 Feb 1998	FINA World Cup	Hong Kong, China	
Men 50 Butterfly		21 Feb 1998	FINA World Cup	Hong Kong, China	
Men 50 Butterfly		25 Feb 1998	FINA World Cup	Beijing, China	
Men 100 Butterfly		26 Feb 1998	FINA World Cup	Beijing, China	
Men 100 Butterfly		22 Nov 1998	FINA World Cup	Rio de Janeiro, Brazil	
Men 50 Butterfly		27 Nov 1998	FINA World Cup	Edmonton, Canada	
Men 100 Butterfly		28 Nov 1998	FINA World Cup	Edmonton, Canada	
Men 50 Butterfly		1 Dec 1998	FINA World Cup	College Station, Texas, United States	
Men 100 Butterfly		2 Dec 1998	FINA World Cup	College Station, Texas, United States	
Men 50 Butterfly		15 Jan 1999	FINA World Cup	Sydney, Australia	
Men 100 Butterfly		15 Jan 1999	FINA World Cup	Sydney, Australia	
Men 4×100m Medley Relay		4 Apr 1999	FINA World Short Course Championships	Hong Kong, China	
Men 50 Butterfly		23 Nov 2001	FINA World Cup	Edmonton, Canada	
Men 100 Butterfly		24 Nov 2001	FINA World Cup	Edmonton, Canada	
Men 50 Butterfly		27 Nov 2001	FINA World Cup	New York City, United States	
Men 100 Butterfly		28 Nov 2001	FINA World Cup	New York City, United States	
Men 100 Medley		7 Dec 2001	FINA World Cup	Melbourne, Australia	
Men 50 Butterfly		8 Dec 2001	FINA World Cup	Melbourne, Australia	
Men 100 Butterfly		9 Dec 2001	FINA World Cup	Melbourne, Australia	
Men 50 Butterfly		18 Jan 2002	FINA World Cup	Paris, France	
Men 100 Butterfly		18 Jan 2002	FINA World Cup	Paris, France	
Men 50 Butterfly		22 Jan 2002	FINA World Cup	Stockholm, Sweden	
Men 100 Butterfly		23 Jan 2002	FINA World Cup	Stockholm, Sweden	
Men 50 Butterfly		26 Jan 2002	FINA World Cup	Berlin, Germany	
Men 50 Butterfly		6 Apr 2002	FINA World Short Course Championships	Moscow, Russia	
Men 100 Butterfly		6 Apr 2002	FINA World Short Course Championships	Moscow, Russia	
Men 50 Butterfly		29 Nov 2003	FINA World Cup	Melbourne, Australia	
Men 50 Butterfly		15 Oct 2011	FINA World Cup	Stockholm, Sweden	
Men 50 Butterfly		18 Oct 2011	FINA World Cup	Moscow, Russia	
Men 50 Butterfly		22 Oct 2011	FINA World Cup	Berlin, Germany	

Long course (50 m)

Event	Time	Date	Meet	Location	Ref
Men 4×100m Medley Relay		18 Jan 1998	FINA World Championships	Perth, Australia	
Men 100 Butterfly		13 Sep 1998	Commonwealth Games	Kuala Lumpur, Malaysia	
Men 4×100m Medley Relay		16 Sep 1998	Commonwealth Games	Kuala Lumpur, Malaysia	
Men 50 Butterfly		28 Jul 2001	FINA World Championships	Fukuoka, Japan	
Men 4×100m Medley Relay		28 Jul 2001	FINA World Championships	Fukuoka, Japan	
Men 50 Butterfly		1 Aug 2002	Commonwealth Games	Manchester, United Kingdom	
Men 100 Butterfly		3 Aug 2002	Commonwealth Games	Manchester, United Kingdom	
Men 4×100m Medley Relay		4 Aug 2002	Commonwealth Games	Manchester, United Kingdom	
Men 100 Butterfly		8 Oct 2010	Commonwealth Games	Delhi, India	
Men 4×100m Medley Relay		9 Oct 2010	Commonwealth Games	Delhi, India	

=== Silver medals ===
Short course (25 m)

Event	Time	Date	Meet	Location	Ref
Men 100 Butterfly		17 Apr 1997	FINA World Short Course Championships	Gothenburg, Sweden	
Men 100 Butterfly		22 Feb 1998	FINA World Cup	Hong Kong, China	
Men 100 Backstroke		25 Feb 1998	FINA World Cup	Beijing, China	
Men 100 Medley		25 Feb 1998	FINA World Cup	Beijing, China	
Men 50 Backstroke		26 Feb 1998	FINA World Cup	Beijing, China	
Men 50 Butterfly		21 Nov 1998	FINA World Cup	Rio de Janeiro, Brazil	
Men 50 Backstroke		28 Nov 1998	FINA World Cup	Edmonton, Canada	
Men 100 Backstroke		23 Nov 2001	FINA World Cup	Edmonton, Canada	
Men 100 Butterfly		27 Jan 2002	FINA World Cup	Berlin, Germany	
Men 4×100m Medley Relay		7 Apr 2002	FINA World Short Course Championships	Moscow, Russia	
Men 50 Butterfly		19 Nov 2005	FINA World Cup	Sydney, Australia	

Long course (50 m)

Event	Time	Date	Meet	Location	Ref
Men 4×100m Medley Relay		9 Oct 2010	Commonwealth Games	Delhi, India	
Men 100 Butterfly		28 Aug 1999	Pan Pacific Championships	Sydney, Australia	
Men 4×100m Medley Relay		23 Sep 2000	Olympic Games	Sydney, Australia	
Men 100 Butterfly		29 Aug 2002	Pan Pacific Championships	Yokohama, Japan	
Men 4×100m Medley Relay		29 Aug 2002	Pan Pacific Championships	Yokohama, Japan	
Men 50 Butterfly		6 Oct 2010	Commonwealth Games	Delhi, India	
Men 4×100m Medley Relay		31 Jul 2011	FINA World Championships	Shanghai, China	

=== Bronze medals ===
Short course (25 m)

Event	Time	Date	Meet	Location	Ref
Men 100 Butterfly		22 Jan 1998	FINA World Cup	Sydney, Australia	
Men 50 Freestyle		22 Feb 1998	FINA World Cup	Hong Kong, China	
Men 50 Freestyle		26 Feb 1998	FINA World Cup	Beijing, China	
Men 100 Backstroke		27 Nov 2001	FINA World Cup	New York City, United States	
Men 50 Butterfly		21 Nov 2009	FINA World Cup	Singapore, Singapore	
Men 100 Butterfly		22 Nov 2009	FINA World Cup	Singapore, Singapore	
Men 4×100m Medley Relay		21 Aug 2010	Pan Pacific Championships	Irvine, California, United States	
Men 100 Butterfly		16 Oct 2011	FINA World Cup	Stockholm, Sweden	

Long course (50 m)

Event	Time	Date	Meet	Location	Ref
Men 100 Butterfly		8 Jan 1998	FINA World Championships	Perth, Australia	
Men 100 Butterfly		22 Sep 2000	Olympic Games	Sydney, Australia	
Men 100 Butterfly		26 Jul 2001	FINA World Championships	Fukuoka, Japan	
Men 50 Butterfly		25 Jul 2011	FINA World Championships	Shanghai, China	

== Personal life ==
Huegill married Sara Hills in 2011. They have two daughters, born in 2012 and 2014. After separating earlier in 2018, Huegill made a public announcement in December the same year and the couple divorced.

Since 2019 Huegill has been in a relationship with Australian lawyer, technology executive and investor Roxan Toll whose family founded the eponymous Toll Group, one of Australia's oldest companies and Asia-Pacific's largest transport and logistics provider. The couple have two sons born in 2021 and 2023.

In 2024 during an appearance on SBS Insight Huegill told host Kumi Taguchi that he was diagnosed with ADHD which lead him to "venture down this path of neurodiversity" to make better sense of his condition because human performance has been a big part of his life from "both the physiology and psychology side." He admitted that the diagnosis brought on a wave of emotions.

== Publications ==
- Be Your Best: Hunt For Gold, TV documentary for FOXTEL, aired in February 2012.
- Huegill, Geoff (2012). Be Your Best. Random House. ISBN 978-1742751658.
- Huegill, Geoff (2012). Be Your Best - The Champions Power of 3 Plan. Random House. ISBN 978-1742756301.

== See also ==
- List of Commonwealth Games medallists in swimming (men)
- List of Olympic medalists in swimming (men)
- World record progression 50 metres butterfly

Preceded by Paul Khoury	Cleo Bachelor of the Year; 2003	Succeeded by Andrew G

Records
Preceded by Denis Pankratov	Men's 50 metre butterfly world record holder 14 May 2000 – 2 July 2003	Succeeded by Matt Welsh
Preceded by Mark Foster	Men's 50 metre butterfly (25m) world record holder 18 December 2001 – 10 October 2004	Succeeded by Ian Crocker
