= Sergey Pankov (swimmer) =

Uzbekistani swimmer (born 1988)

Personal information
- Full name: Sergey Pankov
- National team: Uzbekistan
- Born: 2 December 1988 (age 37) Tashkent, Uzbek SSR, Soviet Union
- Height: 1.80 m (5 ft 11 in)
- Weight: 71 kg (157 lb)

Sport
- Sport: Swimming
- Strokes: Backstroke, butterfly
Medal record
Men's swimming
Representing Uzbekistan
Asian Championships
Bronze medal – third place	2006 Singapore	200 m backstroke

Sergey Pankov (Uzbek: Сергей Панков; born December 2, 1988) is an Uzbek swimmer, who specialized in backstroke and butterfly events. He won a bronze medal in the 200 m backstroke at the 2006 Asian Swimming Championships in Singapore, and had achieved an eighth-place finish in the same discipline at the 2010 Asian Games in Guangzhou, China.

Pankov made his Olympic debut, as a 15-year-old, in Athens 2004, where he competed in the men's 200 m butterfly. Swimming in heat one as a newcomer to the international scene, Pankov posted his own personal best of 2:13.06 to round out the field of 39 swimmers to last place in the prelims.

At the 2008 Summer Olympics in Beijing, Pankov qualified for his second Uzbek team in the 200 m backstroke. He cleared a FINA B-cut of 2:03.79 (200 m backstroke) from the Kazakhstan Open Championships in Almaty. Pankov rounded out the first heat to last place, almost two seconds behind Oleg Rabota of Kazakhstan and Brett Fraser of the Cayman Islands, recording his lifetime best at 2:03.51. Pankov failed to advance into the semifinals, as he placed thirty-eighth overall in the prelims.
