= Pablo Martín Abal =

Argentine swimmer

Personal information
- Full name: Pablo Martín Abal
- National team: Argentina
- Born: 19 March 1977 (age 49) Santa Rosa, La Pampa, Argentina
- Height: 1.86 m (6 ft 1 in)
- Weight: 81 kg (179 lb)

Sport
- Sport: Swimming
- Strokes: Butterfly, Backstroke
- College team: Arizona State University (U.S.)
- Coach: Mike Chasson (U.S.)

Pablo Martín Abal (born March 19, 1977) is an Argentine former swimmer, who specialized in butterfly and backstroke events. He is a 2000 Olympian, an Argentine record holder in both sprint backstroke and butterfly, and a three-time All-American honoree for the Arizona State University swimming and diving team while studying in the United States.

Abal accepted an athletic scholarship to attend the Arizona State University in Tempe, Arizona, where he played for the Arizona State Sun Devils swimming and diving team, under head coach Mike Chasson. While swimming for the Sun Devils, Abal received three All-American honors, and recorded the second-fastest time in school's history for the 100-yard backstroke (48.26) at the 1999 NCAA Championships. At the end of his college career, Abal graduated from the university with a bachelor's degree in Industrial Engineering.

Abal competed in two swimming events for Argentina at the 2000 Summer Olympics in Sydney. He achieved a FINA B-cut of 54.67 (100 m butterfly) from the Argentine National Championships in Buenos Aires. On the sixth day of the Games, Abal placed twenty-eighth in the 100 m butterfly. Swimming in heat five, he posted a lifetime best of 54.45 to pick up a sixth seed, but missed the semifinals by 0.64 of a second with a twenty-eighth-place effort. Abal also teamed up with Eduardo Germán Otero, Sergio Andres Ferreyra, and José Meolans in the 4 × 100 m medley relay. Swimming a butterfly leg in heat three, Abal recorded a split of 53.96, a national record, but the Argentines settled only for seventh place and eighteenth overall in a final time of 3:43.61. Pablo Abal started competing in Master swimming in 2016. He participated in the X South American championship in short course meters in Uruguay placing 1st in 50 butterfly with 25.83s, 1st in 100 IM with 1´00.68s and 1st in 50 backstroke breaking the World Record for the category 35–39 with 25.70s.
