= Anatoly Polyakov =

Russian swimmer

Personal information
- Full name: Anatoly Sergeyevich Polyakov
- Born: 10 May 1980 (age 46) Vorkuta, Komi ASSR, Soviet Union
Medal record
Men's swimming
Representing Russia
World Championships (LC)
Bronze medal – third place	2001 Fukuoka	200 m butterfly
World Championships (SC)
Bronze medal – third place	2000 Athens	200 m butterfly
Bronze medal – third place	2000 Athens	4×200 m freestyle
European Championships (LC)
Gold medal – first place	2000 Helsinki	200 m butterfly
Gold medal – first place	2002 Berlin	4×100 m medley
Bronze medal – third place	1999 Istanbul	200 m butterfly
Bronze medal – third place	2002 Berlin	200 m butterfly
Bronze medal – third place	2004 Madrid	200 m butterfly
European Championships (SC)
Silver medal – second place	2000 Valencia	200 m butterfly
Bronze medal – third place	2000 Valencia	100 m butterfly
Bronze medal – third place	2001 Antwerp	200 m butterfly

Anatoly Sergeyevich Polyakov (Russian: Анатолий Серге́евич Поляков; born 10 May 1980) is a butterfly swimmer from Russia, who won a bronze in the men's 200 metres butterfly event at the 2004 European Championships in Madrid, Spain. He represented his native country at two consecutive Summer Olympics, starting in 2000. In 2007 Polyakov was suspended for two years after he failed a drug test for boldenone doping.
