= Aghiles Slimani =

Algerian swimmer

Personal information
- Full name: Aghiles Slimani
- National team: Algeria
- Born: 20 August 1982 (age 43)
- Height: 1.72 m (5 ft 8 in)
- Weight: 57 kg (126 lb)

Sport
- Sport: Swimming
- Strokes: Butterfly

Aghiles Slimani (Arabic: اغليس سليماني; born August 20, 1982) is an Algerian former swimmer, who specialized in butterfly events. Slimani qualified for two swimming events at the 2004 Summer Olympics in Athens, by posting FINA B-standard entry times of 55.40 (100 m butterfly) and 2:03.18 (200 m butterfly) from the World Championships in Barcelona, Spain. In the 200 m butterfly, Slimani challenged seven other swimmers in heat two, including Olympic veteran Vladan Marković of Serbia. He raced to sixth place and thirty-first overall by 0.16 of a second behind Markovic in 2:04.93. In his second event, 100 m butterfly, Slimani placed forty-eighth on the morning's preliminaries. Swimming in heat three, he edged out Turkey's Onur Uras to take a seventh seed by fifteen hundredths of a second (0.15) in 56.22.
