= Oleg Lyashko (swimmer) =

Uzbekistani swimmer (born 1982)

Personal information
- Full name: Oleg Lyashko
- National team: Uzbekistan
- Born: 13 October 1982 (age 43) Tashkent, Uzbek SSR, Soviet Union
- Height: 1.85 m (6 ft 1 in)
- Weight: 87 kg (192 lb)

Sport
- Sport: Swimming
- Strokes: Butterfly

Oleg Lyashko (Uzbek: Олег Ляшко; born October 13, 1982) is an Uzbek former swimmer, who specialized in butterfly events. Lyashko qualified for the men's 100 m butterfly at the 2004 Summer Olympics in Athens, by posting a FINA B-standard of 56.08 from the Kazakhstan Open Championships in Almaty. He challenged seven other swimmers in heat two, including 17-year-old Michal Rubáček of the Czech Republic. He raced to second place by a 1.03-second margin behind winner Rubacek in a personal best of 55.90. Lyashko failed to advance into the semifinals, as he placed forty-sixth overall in the preliminaries.
