= Sergio Cabrera (swimmer) =

Paraguayan swimmer

Personal information
- Full name: Sergio Moises Cabrera Diaz
- Nationality: Paraguay
- Born: February 17, 1985 (age 41) Paraguay
- Height: 1.69 m (5 ft 6 1/2 in)
- Weight: 62 kg (137 lb)

Sport
- Sport: Swimming
- Strokes: Butterfly

Sergio Moises Cabrera Diaz (born February 17, 1985) is a male swimmer from Paraguay. He was the nation's only swimming competitor at the 2004 Summer Olympics in Athens, Greece, where he ended up in 35th place in the men's 200 metres butterfly event.

== International competitions ==
- 2003 Pan American Games
- 2004 Summer Olympics
