= Luc Decker =

Luxembourgish swimmer (born 1977)

Personal information
- Full name: Luc René Decker
- National team: Luxembourg
- Born: 3 March 1977 (age 49) Luxembourg City, Luxembourg
- Height: 1.96 m (6 ft 5 in)
- Weight: 74 kg (163 lb)

Sport
- Sport: Swimming
- Strokes: Butterfly

Luc René Decker (born 3 March 1977) is a Luxembourgish former swimmer, who specialized in butterfly events. He represented his nation Luxembourg at the 2000 Summer Olympics, and held three Luxembourgish records in all butterfly distances (50, 100, and 200 m).

Decker competed only in the men's 100 m butterfly at the 2000 Summer Olympics in Sydney. He achieved a FINA B-cut of 55.93 from the European Long Course Meet in Luxembourg City. He challenged seven other swimmers in heat three, including Kyrgyzstan's Konstantin Ushkov, silver medalist for Russia in Atlanta four years earlier, and Uzbekistan's top favorite Ravil Nachaev. He raced to a fourth seed by almost a full second behind winner Nachaev in 56.10. Decker failed to advance into the semifinals, as he placed forty-seventh overall in the prelims.

Since his retirement came after the Olympics, Decker completed his master of science degree in political economy at Paris-Sorbonne University, and later worked for investment promotion at the Ministry of the Economy and Foreign Trade in Luxembourg. On 1 July 2013 Decker was appointed as the consul general for Luxembourg and an executive director of the Luxembourg Trade and Investment in Shanghai, China.
