= Bertrand Bristol =

Seychellois swimmer

Personal information
- Full name: Bertrand Bristol
- National team: Seychelles
- Born: 5 February 1982 (age 44)
- Height: 1.86 m (6 ft 1 in)
- Weight: 72 kg (159 lb)

Sport
- Sport: Swimming
- Strokes: Butterfly

Bertrand Bristol (born February 5, 1982) is a Seychellois former swimmer, who specialized in butterfly events. Bristol qualified for the men's 200 m butterfly at the 2004 Summer Olympics in Athens, by receiving a Universality place from FINA, in an entry time of 2:09.68. He challenged six other swimmers in heat one, including 15-year-old Sergey Pankov of Uzbekistan. He set a Seychellois record of 2:09.07 to edge out Pankov for a sixth spot by nearly four seconds. Bristol failed to advance into the semifinals, as he placed thirty-eighth overall in the preliminaries.
