= Zoran Lazarovski =

Macedonian swimmer (born 1980)

Personal information
- Full name: Zoran Lazarovski
- National team: North Macedonia
- Born: 26 December 1980 (age 45) Skopje, SR Macedonia, SFR Yugoslavia
- Height: 1.83 m (6 ft 0 in)
- Weight: 73 kg (161 lb)

Sport
- Sport: Swimming
- Strokes: Butterfly

Zoran Lazarovski (Macedonian: Зоран Лазаровски; born 26 December 1980) is a Macedonian former swimmer, who specialized in butterfly events. He is a two-time Olympian (2000 and 2004), and a former Macedonian record holder in the 200 m butterfly.

Lazarovski made his first Macedonian team at the 2000 Summer Olympics in Sydney, where he competed in the men's 200 m butterfly. Swimming in heat two, he edged out Hong Kong's Mark Kwok to claim a second spot and twenty-ninth overall by 0.69 of a second in 2:01.30.

At the 2004 Summer Olympics in Athens, Lazarovski qualified again for the 200 m butterfly, by posting a FINA B-standard entry time of 2:03.69 from the World Championships in Barcelona, Spain. He challenged seven other swimmers on the same heat as Sydney, including Olympic veteran Vladan Marković of Serbia and Montenegro. He raced to fourth place by 0.11 of a second behind Bulgaria's Georgi Palazov in 2:02.26. Lazarovski failed to advance into the semifinals, as he placed twenty-seventh overall in the preliminaries.
