= Joris Keizer =

Dutch swimmer (born 1979)

Medal record

Representing Netherlands

Men's swimming

World Championships (SC)
Bronze medal – third place	1999 Hong Kong	50 m butterfly

Joris Gerhard Keizer (born 26 January 1979, in Hengelo) is a retired butterfly swimmer from the Netherlands, who competed for his native country at two consecutive Summer Olympics, starting in 2000 in Sydney, Australia. There he was eliminated in the semifinals of the 100m butterfly, and finished in fourth place with the men's 4×100 medley relay team. A year earlier, Keizer won the bronze medal in the 50m butterfly at the 1999 FINA Short Course World Championships. He retired from the sport after a disappointing appearance at the 2004 Summer Olympics in Athens, Greece.

He received his PhD in Physics and is now an Associate Professor at the University of New South Wales. He has gone on to do research into the fields of quantum computing and quantum physics at Silicon Quantum Computing.

== See also ==
- Dutch records in swimming
