= Andrew Livingston (swimmer) =

American swimmer (born 1978)

Personal information
- Full name: Andrew Joseph Livingston Conners
- Nickname: "AJ"
- National team: Puerto Rico
- Born: November 12, 1978 (age 47) Farmington, Michigan
- Height: 5 ft 9 in (1.75 m)
- Weight: 170 lb (77 kg)

Sport
- Sport: Swimming
- Strokes: Butterfly
- Club: Cypress Fairbanks Swim Club
- College team: University of Nevada Las Vegas (UNLV)
- Coach: Jim Reitz (UNLV)

Andrew Joseph Livingston Conners (born November 12, 1978) is a competitive swimmer from the United States, specializing in butterfly who competed for the University of Nevada Las Vegas. He represented Puerto Rico at the 2000 Summer Olympics and the 2004 Summer Olympics in the 100 and 200-meter butterfly events.

Livingston was born November 12, 1978 to Mona and David Livingston in Farmington, Michigan. His mother is from Puerto Rico, providing him U.S. citizenship. Graduating in 1997, he attended Cypress Falls High School in Houston, Texas, and swam for the strong program at Houston's Cypress Fairbanks Swim Club. Completing the event with a time of 48.27, he was the Texas State High School Champion in the 100 butterfly. In the 200 butterfly, he placed third at Senior Nationals. During his High School career, he competed for United States at the 1997 World University Games Italy, but has primarily represented Puerto Rico in swimming since then.

== 2000-2004 Olympics ==
Livingston finished thirteenth in the 200 meter butterfly, swimming for Puerto at the 2000 Olympics and placed thirty-second in the 100-meter butterfly. Swimming for Puerto Rico again at the 2004 Olympics, he tied for 21st place in the 200 meter butterfly.

=== University of Nevada Los Vegas ===
Livingston attended the University of Nevada, Las Vegas, majoring in Hotel Management, where he was coached by Jim Reitz. Gaining local recognition during his collegiate career, he was named the 2001 UNLV Sportsman of the Year.

While at UNLV, at the 2001 Mountain West Conference (MWC) Championships, he placed first in the 200 butterfly and took a fifth place in the 100 fly and 200 IM. Making him a two time recipient of All American honors at the NCAA Championships, he placed fifth in the 200 butterfly. He first won All American Honors in the 1998-9 season as a Sophomore. He has competed on the U.S. National team through his dual citizenship.

== Life outside swimming ==
In 2008, after his swimming career, Andrew joined the US Coast Guard. After finishing boot camp, he was stationed in Winchester Bay, Oregon. He then applied for Information Systems Technician "A" School located in Petaluma, California, and was later stationed at CAMSPAC Point Reyes, California.
