= Camilo Becerra =

Colombian swimmer

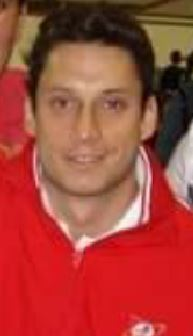

Personal information
- Full name: Camilo José Becerra Velasco
- National team: Colombia
- Born: 10 October 1980 (age 45) Cali, Colombia
- Height: 1.84 m (6 ft 0 in)

Sport
- Sport: Swimming
- Strokes: Freestyle
- Club: Fort Worth Area Swim Team
- College team: Southern Methodist University
Medal record
Men's swimming
Representing Colombia
South American Championships
| Silver medal – second place | 2008 São Paulo | 100 m butterfly |
| Bronze medal – third place | 2008 São Paulo | 50 m freestyle |
| Bronze medal – third place | 2008 São Paulo | 50 m backstroke |
| Bronze medal – third place | 2008 São Paulo | 50 m butterfly |

Camilo Becerra (born 10 October 1980) is a three-time Olympic freestyle swimmer from Colombia. He swam from Colombia at the 2000, 2004 and 2008 Olympics.

The 2004 Games saw his highest Olympic finish to date: a tie for 37th in the men's 50m freestyle.

Becerra also swam at the 2007 World Championships.

He graduated from Southern Methodist University in 2006 with a degree in Finance and Economics. Becerra swims for the Fort Worth Area Swim team in Fort Worth Texas and is coached by Ron Forrest.
