= Zsolt Gáspár =

Hungarian swimmer (born 1977)

Personal information
- Full name: Gáspár Zsolt
- Nationality: Hungary
- Born: 17 May 1977 (age 49) Budapest, Hungary
- Height: 1.90 m (6 ft 3 in)
- Weight: 87 kg (192 lb)

Sport
- Sport: Swimming
- Strokes: Butterfly
- Club: Ferencvárosi Torna Club-Print 17
Medal record
European Championships (LC)
Bronze medal – third place	2004 Madrid	4×100 m medley

Zsolt Gáspár (born 17 March 1977 in Budapest) is a butterfly swimmer from Hungary, who competed in two consecutive Summer Olympics for his native country, starting in 2000. He attended the University of South Carolina from 1999-2002 while training for the Olympics.
