= Tero Välimaa =

Finnish swimmer

Personal information
- Full name: Tero Välimaa
- Nationality: Finland
- Born: August 10, 1978 (age 47) Gothenburg, Västra Götaland
- Height: 1.85 m (6 ft 1 in)
- Weight: 75 kg (165 lb)

Sport
- Sport: Swimming
- Strokes: Butterfly
- Club: SK Neptun, Stockholm
Medal record
European Championships (SC)
Silver medal – second place	2002 Rijeka	4x50 m medley
Bronze medal – third place	2001 Antwerp	50 m butterfly

Tero Välimaa (born August 10, 1978, in Gothenburg, Västra Götaland) is a retired male butterfly swimmer from Finland, who was born in Sweden. He competed for Finland at the 2000 Summer Olympics in Sydney, Australia.
