= Takashi Yamamoto (swimmer) =

Japanese swimmer (born 1978)

Personal information
- Full name: Takashi Yamamoto
- Nationality: Japan
- Born: July 23, 1978 (age 48) Osaka, Japan
- Height: 1.78 m (5 ft 10 in)
- Weight: 72 kg (159 lb)

Sport
- Sport: Swimming
- Strokes: Butterfly
- Club: Itoman Swimming School
Medal record
Men's swimming
Representing Japan
Olympic Games
Silver medal – second place	2004 Athens	200 m butterfly
Bronze medal – third place	2004 Athens	4×100 m medley
World Championships (LC)
Silver medal – second place	2003 Barcelona	200 m butterfly
Silver medal – second place	2007 Melbourne	4×100 m medley
Bronze medal – third place	2003 Barcelona	4×100 m medley
World Championships (SC)
Silver medal – second place	1999 Hong Kong	200 m butterfly
Pan Pacific Championships
Silver medal – second place	1999 Sydney	200 m butterfly
Bronze medal – third place	1995 Atlanta	4×100 m medley
Bronze medal – third place	1999 Sydney	100 m butterfly
Bronze medal – third place	1999 Sydney	4×100 m medley
Bronze medal – third place	2006 Victoria	100 m butterfly
Asian Games
Gold medal – first place	1998 Bangkok	100 m butterfly
Gold medal – first place	1998 Bangkok	200 m butterfly
Gold medal – first place	1998 Bangkok	4×100 m medley
Gold medal – first place	2002 Busan	100 m butterfly
Gold medal – first place	2002 Busan	4×100 m medley
Gold medal – first place	2006 Doha	100 m butterfly
Gold medal – first place	2006 Doha	4×100 m medley
Silver medal – second place	2002 Busan	200 m butterfly

Takashi Yamamoto (山本 貴司, Yamamoto Takashi; born July 23, 1978 in Osaka) is an Olympic medal-winning swimmer from Japan, who won the silver medal in the 200 m butterfly at the 2004 Summer Olympics in Athens, Greece. He was also part of Japan's bronze medal-winning 4 × 100 m medley relay team.

Yamamoto also competed in the 100 m butterfly event, and qualified for the semifinals, but narrowly missed out on qualifying for the final. The 2004 Games were Yamamoto's third Olympic Games. He had previously swum in the 1996 Olympic Games and 2000 Olympic Games, but did not receive a medal at either.

He married swimmer Suzu Chiba in 2002. They have four children together.
