= Simão Morgado =

Portuguese swimmer

Personal information
- Full name: Simão Pedro Gomes Morgado
- Nationality: Portugal
- Born: 4 March 1979 (age 47) São Domingos de Benfica, Grande Lisboa
- Height: 1.84 m (6.0 ft)
- Weight: 75 kg (165 lb)

Sport
- Sport: Swimming
- Strokes: Butterfly
- Club: Clube de Natação da Amadora

Simão Morgado (born 4 March 1979) is a Portuguese swimmer. He is the national record holder of the 50-meter butterfly (long course) and since 1997 and he has beaten the National Record in the 100 meters thirteen times, what makes him one of the greatest swimmers in Portugal's history. Simão Morgado has participated in multiple international competitions and in 2004, at the European Long Course Championships in Madrid, he placed sixth in the 100-meter butterfly. He has raced at four consecutive Summer Olympics, with his best result coming at the 2004 Athens Olympics.

His swimming club is Clube da Natação da Amadora, based in Lisbon.
