= Ioan Gherghel =

Romanian swimmer

Personal information
- Full name: Ioan Ştefan Gherghel
- Nationality: Romania
- Born: August 18, 1978 (age 47) Baia Mare, Maramureş, Socialist Republic of Romania
- Height: 1.88 m (6 ft 2 in)
- Weight: 76 kg (168 lb)

Sport
- Sport: Swimming
- Strokes: Butterfly
- College team: Alabama Crimson Tide (USA)
- Coach: Don Wagner (USA)
Medal record
European Championships
| Silver medal – second place | 2004 Madrid | 200 fly |
| Bronze medal – third place | 2000 Helsinki | 200 fly |
SC Worlds
| Bronze medal – third place | 2002 Moscow | 200 fly |
| Silver medal – second place | 2004 Indianapolis | 200 fly |
SC Europeans
| Bronze medal – third place | 2002 Riesa | 200 fly |
| Bronze medal – third place | 2004 Vienna | 100 fly |
| Bronze medal – third place | 2004 Vienna | 200 fly |

Ioan Ştefan Gherghel (born August 8, 1978 in Baia Mare, Maramureş, Romania) is an Olympic butterfly swimmer from Romania. He swam for Romania at three consecutive Olympics: 2000, 2004 and 2008.

At the 2000 European Championships, he won his first international medal: a bronze in the 200 butterfly, clocking 1:58.54.

== International Press ==
- NCAA champion and three-time Olympian Stefan Gherghel joins The Sun Devils team as a coach
- Stefan Gherghel brings his experience as one of the fastest athletes in the history of collegiate swimming
- Stefan Gherghel sets UA record and wins NCAA race
- Stefan Ghergel NCAA Champ
- Gherghel Wins NCAA 200 Butterfly Championship
- watch Stefan Gherghel in Beijing at the Summer Olympics

== Videos ==
- Stefan Gherghel and Alex Coci in the "Morning Swim Show"
- Stefan Gherghel si Razvan Florea on "How to create champions" by Andreea Raducan part I
- Stefan Gherghel si Razvan Florea on "How to create champions" by Andreea Raducan part II
- Stefan Gherghel si Razvan Florea on "How to create champions" by Andreea Raducan part III
- Stefan Gherghel si Razvan Florea on "How to create champions" by Andreea Raducan part IV
