= Georgi Palazov =

Bulgarian swimmer

Personal information
- Full name: Georgi Palazov
- National team: Bulgaria
- Born: 4 February 1980 (age 46) Burgas, People's Republic of Bulgaria
- Height: 1.93 m (6 ft 4 in)
- Weight: 93 kg (205 lb)

Sport
- Sport: Swimming
- Strokes: Butterfly, medley
- Club: National Sports Academy

Georgi Palazov (Bulgarian: Георги Палазов; born 4 February 1980 in Burgas) is a Bulgarian former swimmer, who specialized in butterfly and medley events. He represented Bulgaria at three Olympic Games – 2000 Summer Olympics in Sydney, 2004 Summer Olympics in Athens, and 2008 Summer Olympics in Beijing. Palazov achieved his best possible result at the Olympics, when he finished thirty-ninth in the men's 200 m butterfly in 2008, with a time of 2:01.84. Palazov also competed in the men's 400 m individual medley in Sydney, where he set a national record, with a time of 4:35.92, finishing only in fortieth place.

In addition to his numerous achievements at the Olympics, Palazov had also set two national records for the 100 m and 200 m butterfly events at the 2008 European Aquatics Championships in Eindhoven, Netherlands, and the other for the 50 m butterfly event at the 2004 European Aquatics Championships in Madrid, Spain.
