= Swimming at the 1998 World Aquatics Championships – Men's 400 metre individual medley =

Men's 400 metre individual medley at the 1998 FINA World Championships
- Date: 13 January 1998
- Competitors: 25
- Winning time: 4 minutes 14.95 seconds

Medalists
gold medal	Tom Dolan	United States
silver medal	Marcel Wouda	Netherlands
bronze medal	Curtis Myden	Canada

The finals and the qualifying heats of the men's 400 metre individual medley event at the 1998 World Aquatics Championships were held on Tuesday 13 January 1998 in Perth, Western Australia.

== A Final ==
Rank	Name	Time
Gold medal	Tom Dolan (USA)	4:14.95
Silver medal	Marcel Wouda (NED)	4:15.53
Bronze medal	Curtis Myden (CAN)	4:16.45
4	Matthew Dunn (AUS)	4:16.76
5	István Batházi (HUN)	4:20.28
6	Robert Seibt (GER)	4:20.56
7	Trent Steed (AUS)	4:21.86
8	Tatsuya Kinugasa (JPN)	4:21.91

== B Final ==
Rank	Name	Time
9	Frederik Hviid (ESP)	4:21.66
10	Steven Brown (USA)	4:22.14
11	Xavier Marchand (FRA)	4:23.24
12	Miguel Santolaya (ESP)	4:26.79
13	Krešimir Čač (CRO)	4:27.18
14	Josef Horký (CZE)	4:29.75
15	Mark Kwok (HKG)	4:30.66
—	Xiong Guoming (CHN)	DSQ

== Qualifying heats ==
Rank	Name	Time
1	Marcel Wouda (NED)	4:17.91
2	Curtis Myden (CAN)	4:18.70
3	Tom Dolan (USA)	4:19.67
4	Trent Steed (AUS)	4:20.13
5	Matthew Dunn (AUS)	4:21.22
6	Robert Seibt (GER)	4:21.50
7	István Batházi (HUN)	4:21.95
8	Tatsuya Kinugasa (JPN)	4:22.07
9	Xavier Marchand (FRA)	4:22.77
10	Frederik Hviid (ESP)	4:22.90
11	Steven Brown (USA)	4:23.93
12	Josef Horký (CZE)	4:28.70
13	Xiong Guoming (CHN)	4:28.72
14	Miguel Santolaya (ESP)	4:29.42
15	Mark Kwok (HKG)	4:29.71
16	Krešimir Čač (CRO)	4:30.83
17	Kim Bang-Hyun (KOR)	4:30.91
18	Oliver Young (NZL)	4:30.94
19	Gunter Rodríguez (CUB)	4:31.47
20	Marko Milenkovič (SLO)	4:31.89
21	Ratapong Sirisanont (THA)	4:32.76
22	Alex Fong Lik-Sun (HKG)	4:32.91
23	Adrian Andermatt (SUI)	4:33.52
24	Jin Hao (CHN)	4:33.95
25	Aleksandar Miladinovski (MKD)	4:34.72

== See also ==
- 1996 Men's Olympic Games 400m Individual Medley (Atlanta)
- 1997 Men's World SC Championships 400m Individual Medley (Gothenburg)
- 1997 Men's European LC Championships 400m Individual Medley (Seville)
- 2000 Men's Olympic Games 400m Individual Medley (Sydney)
