= Swimming at the 1998 World Aquatics Championships – Men's 4 × 200 metre freestyle relay =

Men's 4×200 metre freestyle relay at the 1998 FINA World Championships
- Date: 13 January 1998
- Teams: 12
- Winning time: 7 minutes 12.48 seconds

Medalists
gold medal	Michael Klim; Grant Hackett; Ian Thorpe; Daniel Kowalski	Australia
silver medal	Pieter v.d. Hoogenband; Mark van der Zijden; Martijn Zuijdweg; Marcel Wouda	Netherlands
bronze medal	Paul Palmer; Gavin Meadows; Andrew Clayton; James Salter	Great Britain

The final and the qualifying heats of the men's 4×200 metre freestyle relay event at the 1998 World Aquatics Championships were held on Tuesday 13 January 1998 in Perth, Western Australia.

== Final ==
Rank	Team	Time
Gold medal	AUSTRALIA; Michael Klim; Grant Hackett; Ian Thorpe; Daniel Kowalski	7:12.48 CR; 1:47.67; 1:48.41; 1:47.67; 1:48.73
Silver medal	NETHERLANDS; Pieter van den Hoogenband; Mark van der Zijden; Martijn Zuijdweg; Marcel Wouda	7:16.77; 1:48.36; 1:50.60; 1:49.75; 1:48.06
Bronze medal	GREAT BRITAIN; Paul Palmer; Gavin Meadows; Andrew Clayton; James Salter	7:17.33; 1:49.72; 1:48.61; 1:50.38; 1:48.62
4	GERMANY; Christian Keller; Stefan Pohl; Jörg Hoffmann; Steffen Zesner	7:19.70; 1:50.27; 1:49.91; 1:50.12; 1:49.40
5	UNITED STATES; Uğur Taner; Josh Davis; Tom Malchow; Tom Dolan	7:19.97; 1:48.83; 1:48.16; 1:49.69; 1:53.29
6	DENMARK; Jeppe Nielsen; Jacob Carstensen; Jacob Rasmussen; Anders Jensen	7:26.07; 1:52.71; 1:49.49; 1:50.65; 1:53.22
7	RUSSIA; Dimitri Kuzmin; Alexei Stepanov; Maxim Korshunov; Dimitri Chernyshev	7:27.95; 1:52.13; 1:50.68; 1:52.91; 1:52.23
8	SWEDEN; Anders Lyrbring; Johan Walberg; Petter Lindh; Max von Bodungen	7:31.71; 1:51.71; 1:52.95; 1:51.93; 1:55.12

== Qualifying heats ==
=== Heat 1 ===
Rank	Team	Time
1	AUSTRALIA; Daniel Kowalski; Grant Hackett; Ian Thorpe; Anthony Rogis	7:18.66
2	GERMANY; Christian Keller; Stefan Herbst; Torsten Spanneberg; Stefan Pohl	7:22.87
3	NETHERLANDS; Mark van der Zijden; Bas-Ido Wennekes; Johan Kenkhuis; Martijn Zuijdweg	7:25.20
4	DENMARK; Jeppe Nielsen; Jacob Carstensen; Jacob Rasmussen; Anders Jensen	7:25.46
5	NEW ZEALAND; Trent Bray; Scott Cameron; Nicholas Tongue; Danyon Loader	7:31.25
6	CHINESE TAIPEI; Li-Yun Lun; Hung-Chien Chih; Huang-Chih Yung; Tseng-Cheng Hua	8:01.87

=== Heat 2 ===
Rank	Team	Time
1	UNITED STATES; Uğur Taner; John Piersma; Trevor Runberg; Scott Tucker	7:20.48
2	GREAT BRITAIN; James Salter; Andrew Clayton; Mark Stevens; Gavin Meadows	7:23.62
3	RUSSIA; Dimitri Chernyshev; Alexei Stepanov; Dimitri Kuzmin; Maxim Korshunov	7:27.32
4	SWEDEN; Anders Lyrbring; Johan Walberg; Petter Lindh; Max von Bodungen	7:28.36
5	UZBEKISTAN; Sergey Erilin; Ravil Nachaev; Peter Vasiliev; Oleg Pukhnaty	8:02.51
—	ITALY; Emiliano Brembilla; Simone Cercato; Moreno Gallina; Massimiliano Rosolino	DSQ

== See also ==
- 1996 Men's Olympic Games 4x200m Freestyle (Atlanta)
- 1997 Men's World Championships (SC) 4x200m Freestyle (Gothenburg)
- 1997 Men's European Championships (LC) 4x200m Freestyle (Seville)
- 2000 Men's Olympic Games 4x200m Freestyle (Sydney)
