= Swimming at the 1998 World Aquatics Championships – Men's 200 metre individual medley =

Men's 200 metre individual medley at the 1998 FINA World Championships
- Date: 17 January 1998
- Competitors: 26
- Winning time: 2 minutes 1.18 seconds

Medalists
gold medal	Marcel Wouda	Netherlands
silver medal	Xavier Marchand	France
bronze medal	Ron Karnaugh	United States

The finals and the qualifying heats of the men's 200 metre individual medley event at the 1998 World Aquatics Championships were held on Saturday 1998-01-17 in Perth, Western Australia.

== A Final ==
Rank	Name	Time
Gold medal	Marcel Wouda (NED)	2:01.18
Silver medal	Xavier Marchand (FRA)	2:01.66
Bronze medal	Ron Karnaugh (USA)	2:01.89
4	Matthew Dunn (AUS)	2:02.03
5	Christian Keller (GER)	2:02.10
6	Curtis Myden (CAN)	2:02.30
7	James Hickman (GBR)	2:04.13
8	Tom Dolan (USA)	2:05.82

== B Final ==
Rank	Name	Time
9	Attila Czene (HUN)	2:02.76
10	Mark van der Zijden (NED)	2:03.59
11	Jani Sievinen (FIN)	2:04.17
12	Serghei Mariniuc (MDA)	2:04.58
13	Michael Halika (ISR)	2:04.96
14	Theo Verster (RSA)	2:05.14
15	Zane King (AUS)	2:05.63
16	Jens Kruppa (GER)	2:05.87

== Qualifying heats ==
Rank	Name	Time
1	Marcel Wouda (NED)	2:01.78
2	Tom Dolan (USA)	2:01.94
3	Christian Keller (GER)	2:02.07
4	Matthew Dunn (AUS)	2:02.16
5	Ron Karnaugh (USA)	2:02.64
5	Curtis Myden (CAN)	2:02.64
7	Xavier Marchand (FRA)	2:02.68
8	James Hickman (GBR)	2:03.42
9	Zane King (AUS)	2:03.46
10	Attila Czene (HUN)	2:03.49
11	Jani Sievinen (FIN)	2:03.89
12	Attila Zubor (HUN)	2:04.30
13	Jens Kruppa (GER)	2:04.35
14	Mark van der Zijden (NED)	2:04.41
15	Serghei Mariniuc (MDA)	2:04.51
16	Michael Halika (ISR)	2:04.87
17	Theo Verster (RSA)	2:05.21
18	Tatsuya Kinugasa (JPN)	2:05.26
19	Jordi Carrasco (ESP)	2:05.70
20	Peter Mankoč (SLO)	2:05.72
21	Krešimir Čač (CRO)	2:06.12
22	Kim Bang-Hyun (KOR)	2:06.60
23	Mark Kwok (HKG)	2:07.30
24	Oliver Young (NZL)	2:08.40
25	Arsenio López (PUR)	2:08.53
26	Josef Horký (CZE)	2:09.01

== See also ==
- 1996 Men's Olympic Games 200m Individual Medley (Atlanta)
- 1997 Men's World SC Championships 200m Individual Medley (Gothenburg)
- 1997 Men's European LC Championships 200m Individual Medley (Seville)
- 2000 Men's Olympic Games 200m Individual Medley (Sydney)
