= Swimming at the 1997 European Aquatics Championships – Men's 400 metre individual medley =

The final of the Men's 400 metres Individual Medley event at the European LC Championships 1997 was held on Wednesday 20 August 1997 in Seville, Spain.

== Finals ==
RANK	FINAL A	TIME
	Marcel Wouda (NED)	4:15.38
	Frederik Hviid (ESP)	4:19.68
	Robert Seibt (GER)	4:20.43
4.	Xavier Marchand (FRA)	4:21.64
5.	István Batházi (HUN)	4:21.93
6.	Uwe Volk (GER)	4:23.76
7.	Jani Sievinen (FIN)	4:24.59
8.	Krešimir Čač (CRO)	4:35.36

RANK	FINAL B	TIME
9.	Massimiliano Eroli (ITA)	4:22.74
10.	Michael Halika (ISR)	4:22.82
11.	Michael Jacobsson (SWE)	4:26.30
12.	Josef Horky (CZE)	4:26.37
13.	Krzysztof Golon (POL)	4:26.54
14.	Petr Kratochvil (CZE)	4:27.23
15.	Adrian Andermatt (SUI)	4:30.24
16.	Marcin Malinski (POL)	4:33.21

== Qualifying heats ==
RANK	HEAT RANKINGS	TIME
1.	Marcel Wouda (NED)	4:20.82
2.	Xavier Marchand (FRA)	4:21.33
3.	Frederik Hviid (ESP)	4:23.34
4.	Uwe Volk (GER)	4:23.66
5.	Jani Sievinen (FIN)	4:23.90
6.	Robert Seibt (GER)	4:24.11
7.	Krešimir Čač (CRO)	4:24.35
8.	István Batházi (HUN)	4:25.06
9.	Josef Horky (CZE)	4:25.69
10.	Michael Halika (ISR)	4:25.98
11.	Marcin Malinski (POL)	4:26.01
12.	Stefano Battistelli (ITA)	4:26.44
13.	Michael Jacobsson (SWE)	4:27.14
14.	Petr Kratochvil (CZE)	4:27.28
15.	Massimiliano Eroli (ITA)	4:27.58
16.	Krzysztof Golon (POL)	4:28.67
17.	Adrian Andermatt (SUI)	4:31.11
18.	Marko Milenkovič (SLO)	4:31.32
19.	Edward Clement (GBR)	4:32.96
20.	Aleksandar Miladinovski (MKD)	4:35.59
21.	Örn Arnarson (ISL)	4:38.19
22.	Sandro Tomaš (CRO)	4:39.49

== See also ==
- 1996 Men's Olympic Games 400m Individual Medley
- 1997 Men's World Championships (SC) 400m Individual Medley
