= Swimming at the 1997 European Aquatics Championships – Men's 200 metre individual medley =

The final of the Men's 200 metres Individual Medley event at the European LC Championships 1997 was held in Sunday 24 August 1997 in Seville, Spain.

== Finals ==
| RANK | FINAL A | TIME |
|---|---|---|
| | Marcel Wouda (NED) | 2:00.77 |
| | Xavier Marchand (FRA) | 2:01.08 |
| | Jani Sievinen (FIN) | 2:02.12 |
| 4. | Christian Keller (GER) | 2:02.50 |
| 5. | Sergei Sergeyev (UKR) | 2:03.61 |
| 6. | Massimiliano Rosolino (ITA) | 2:03.73 |
| 6. | Jordi Carasco (ESP) | 2:03.73 |
| 8. | Peter Mankoč (SLO) | 2:05.79 |

| RANK | FINAL B | TIME |
|---|---|---|
| 9. | Mark van der Zijden (NED) | 2:04.48 |
| 10. | Lionel Moreau (FRA) | 2:04.80 |
| 11. | István Batházi (HUN) | 2:04.81 |
| 12. | Marcin Malinski (POL) | 2:05.10 |
| 13. | Josef Horký (CZE) | 2:05.90 |
| 14. | Michael Jacobsson (SWE) | 2:06.00 |
| 15. | Marko Milenkovič (SLO) | 2:07.70 |
| 16. | Jakob Andersen (DEN) | 2:08.15 |

== Qualifying heats ==
| RANK | HEATS RANKING | TIME |
|---|---|---|
| 1. | Christian Keller (GER) | 2:02.70 |
| 2. | Marcel Wouda (NED) | 2:02.97 |
| 3. | Sergei Sergeyev (UKR) | 2:03.02 |
| 4. | Jani Sievinen (FIN) | 2:03.36 |
| 5. | Xavier Marchand (FRA) | 2:03.58 |
| 6. | Peter Mankoč (SLO) | 2:04.08 |
| 7. | Massimiliano Rosolino (ITA) | 2:04.12 |
| 8. | Jordi Carasco (ESP) | 2:04.24 |
| 9. | Lionel Moreau (FRA) | 2:04.32 |
| 9. | Jens Kruppa (GER) | 2:04.32 |
| 11. | Marcin Malinski (POL) | 2:04.71 |
| 12. | István Batházi (HUN) | 2:04.81 |
| 13. | Mark van der Zijden (NED) | 2:05.01 |
| 14. | Marko Milenkovič (SLO) | 2:05.98 |
| 15. | Michael Jacobsson (SWE) | 2:06.46 |
| 16. | Jakob Andersen (DEN) | 2:06.12 |
| 17. | Josef Horký (CZE) | 2:06.88 |
| 18. | Adrian Turner (GBR) | 2:07.06 |
| 19. | Jacob Carstensen (DEN) | 2:07.07 |
| 20. | Yoav Meiri (ISR) | 2:07.21 |
| 21. | Ismael García (ESP) | 2:07.35 |
| 22. | Adrian Andermatt (SUI) | 2:07.95 |
| 23. | Piotr Florczyk (POL) | 2:08.34 |
| 24. | Petr Kratochvil (CZE) | 2:08.40 |
| 25. | Aleksandar Miladinovski (MKD) | 2:08.54 |
| 26. | Denislav Kalchev (BUL) | 2:09.04 |
| 27. | Miroslav Machovic (SVK) | 2:09.45 |
| 28. | Krešimir Čač (CRO) | 2:09.95 |
| 29. | Michael Halika (ISR) | 2:10.19 |

== See also ==
- 1997 Men's World Championships (SC) 200m Individual Medley
