= 1997 FINA Short Course World Championships – Men's 400m individual medley =

The finals and the qualifying heats of the men's 400 metres individual medley event at the 1997 FINA Short Course World Championships were held on Thursday 17 April 1997 in Gothenburg, Sweden.

== Finals ==
RANK	FINAL A	TIME
	Matthew Dunn (AUS)	4:06.89
	Xie Xufeng (CHN)	4:12.52
	Christian Keller (GER)	4:12.53
4.	Ron Karnaugh (USA)	4:12.53
5.	Trent Steed (AUS)	4:13.04
6.	Uwe Volk (GER)	4:13.34
7.	Xavier Marchand (FRA)	4:18.47
8.	Josef Horky (CZE)	4:19.35

RANK	FINAL B	TIME
9.	Marko Milenkovič (SLO)	4:18.80
10.	Valeri Kalmikovs (LAT)	4:19.75
11.	Toshiaki Kurasawa (JPN)	4:20.03
12.	Adrian Andermatt (SUI)	4:20.86
13.	Alejandro Bermúdez (COL)	4:21.09
14.	Philip Weiss (CAN)	4:21.63
15.	Jean-Yves Faure (FRA)	4:21.69
16.	Michael Jacobson (SWE)	4:23.55

== Qualifying heats ==
RANK	HEATS RANKING	TIME
1.	Matthew Dunn (AUS)	4:11.98
2.	Ron Karnaugh (USA)	4:12.71
3.	Uwe Volk (GER)	4:13.37
4.	Xie Xufeng (CHN)	4:13.62
5.	Christian Keller (GER)	4:14.09
6.	Trent Steed (AUS)	4:14.87
7.	Josef Horky (CZE)	4:17.68
8.	Xavier Marchand (FRA)	4:18.25
9.	Marko Milenkovič (SLO)	4:19.20
10.	Toshiaki Kurasawa (JPN)	4:19.35
11.	Adrian Andermatt (SUI)	4:19.81
12.	Alejandro Bermúdez (COL)	4:19.95
13.	Philip Weiss (CAN)	4:20.20
14.	Michael Jacobson (SWE)	4:22.10
15.	Jean-Yves Faure (FRA)	4:22.38
16.	Valeri Kalmikovs (LAT)	4:22.92
17.	Mark Kwok (HKG)	4:23.23
18.	Kim Henriksen (NOR)	4:23.76
19.	Sandro Tomaš (CRO)	4:23.80
20.	Terence Parkin (RSA)	4:25.68
21.	Alex Miladinovski (MKD)	4:27.25
22.	Jeremy Knowles (BAH)	4:28.36
23.	Arsenio López (PUR)	4:32.78

== See also ==
- 1996 Men's Olympic Games 400 m Individual Medley
- 1997 Men's European LC Championships 400 m Individual Medley
