= Swimming at the 2003 World Aquatics Championships – Men's 200 metre individual medley =

Men's 200m Individual Medley at the 2003 FINA World Aquatics Championships
- Dates: 24 July 2003 (prelims; semis); 25 July 2003 (final)
- Winning time: 1 minute 56.04 seconds

Medalists
gold medal	Michael Phelps	United States
silver medal	Ian Thorpe	Australia
bronze medal	Massimiliano Rosolino	Italy

The Men's 200 Individual Medley event at the 10th FINA World Aquatics Championships swam 24–25 July 2003 in Barcelona, Spain. Preliminary and Semifinal heats swam July 24; the Final was July 25.

At the start of the event, the existing World (WR) and Championship (CR) records were both:

- WR: 1:57.94 swum by Michael Phelps (USA) on June 29, 2003 in Santa Clara, USA
- CR: 1:58.16 swum by Jani Sievinen (Finland) on September 11, 1994 in Rome, Italy

== Results ==
=== Final ===
Place	Swimmer	Nation	Time	Notes
1	Michael Phelps	USA	1:56.04	WR
2	Ian Thorpe	Australia	1:59.66	NR
3	Massimiliano Rosolino	Italy	1:59.71	
4	Jani Sievinen	Finland	1:59.98	
5	George Bovell	Trinidad and Tobago	2:00.06	
6	Takahiro Mori	Japan	2:01.29	
7	Kevin Clements	USA	2:01.51	
8	Brian Johns	Canada	2:01.62	

=== Semifinals ===
Rank	Heat/Lane	Swimmer	Nation	Time	Notes
1	S2 L4	Michael Phelps	USA	1:57.52	q, WR
2	S2 L5	Massimiliano Rosolino	Italy	1:59.84	q
3	S1 L4	George Bovell	Trinidad and Tobago	1:59.86	q
4	S2 L6	Takahiro Mori	Japan	2:00.29	q
5	S2 L8	Ian Thorpe	Australia	2:00.42	q
6	S1 L7	Brian Johns	Canada	2:00.98	q
7	S1 L5	Kevin Clements	USA	2:01.04	q
8	S1 L6	Jani Sievinen	Finland	2:01.08	q
9	S1 L2	Cezar Bădiță	Romania	2:01.58	NR
10	S2 L2	Oussama Mellouli	Tunisia	2:01.64	
11	S1 L3	Vytautas Janušaitis	Lithuania	2:01.67	
12	S2 L3	Christian Keller	Germany	2:01.76	
13	S2 L1	Robin Francis	Great Britain	2:01.89	
14	S1 L8	Justin Norris	Australia	2:02.09	
15	S1 L1	Peng Wu	China	2:02.38	
16	S2 L7	Tamás Kerékjártó	Hungary	2:02.81	

=== Preliminaries ===
Rank	Heat+Lane	Swimmer	Nation	Time	Notes
1	H11 L4	Michael Phelps	United States	1:59.71	q
2	H08 L5	George Bovell	Trinidad and Tobago	2:00.94	q
3	H11 L5	Massimiliano Rosolino	Italy	2:01.24	q
4	H09 L3	Kevin Clements	United States	2:01.43	q
5	H11 L2	Christian Keller	Germany	2:01.90	q
6	H09 L1	Vytautas Janušaitis	Lithuania	2:02.01	q
7	H11 L3	Takahiro Mori	Japan	2:02.02	q
8	H10 L4	Jani Sievinen	Finland	2:02.10	q
9	H10 L2	Oussama Mellouli	Tunisia	2:02.19	q
10	H11 L8	Cezar Bădiță	Romania	2:02.26	q
11	H09 L5	Tamás Kerékjártó	Hungary	2:02.32	q
12	H09 L6	Brian Johns	Canada	2:02.37	q
13	H10 L7	Robin Francis	Great Britain	2:02.50	q
14	H09 L8	Peng Wu	China	2:02.54	q
14	H10 L5	Ian Thorpe	Australia	2:02.54	q
16	H10 L6	Justin Norris	Australia	2:02.61	q
17	H09 L4	Alessio Boggiatto	Italy	2:02.66	
18	H08 L8	Thiago Pereira	Brazil	2:02.67	
19	H11 L1	Ioannis Kokkodis	Greece	2:02.68	
20	H08 L4	Alexei Zatsepine	Russia	2:02.82	
21	H10 L3	István Batházi	Hungary	2:02.83	
22	H11 L7	Jiro Miki	Japan	2:02.89	
23	H08 L3	Igor Berezutskiy	Russia	2:02.90	
24	H10 L1	Dean Kent	New Zealand	2:02.92	
25	H09 L7	Tao Zhao	China	2:03.23	
26	H07 L3	Guntars Deičmans	Latvia	2:03.77	
27	H07 L2	Sergiy Sergeyev	Ukraine	2:04.13	
28	H06 L4	Mihail Alexandrov	Bulgaria	2:04.36	
29	H08 L2	Krešimir Čač	Croatia	2:04.46	
30	H11 L6	Jens Kruppa	Germany	2:04.73	
31	H06 L5	Theo Verster	South Africa	2:04.85	
32	H06 L6	Marko Milenkovič	Slovenia	2:05.17	
33	H07 L4	Jan Vitazka	Czech Republic	2:05.28	
34	H07 L5	Carlos Sayao	Canada	2:05.47	
35	H07 L1	Yves Platel	Switzerland	2:05.64	
36	H08 L6	Terence Parkin	South Africa	2:05.66	
37	H08 L7	Michael Halika	Israel	2:05.68	
38	H06 L2	Miguel Molina	Philippines	2:06.53	
39	H06 L3	Paulius Andrijauskas	Lithuania	2:06.95	
40	H07 L7	Aleksandar Miladinovski	Macedonia	2:07.33	
41	H06 L7	Oleg Pukhnaty	Uzbekistan	2:07.54	
42	H05 L6	Malick Fall	Senegal	2:07.65	
43	H06 L1	Orel Oral	Turkey	2:07.84	
44	H07 L6	Andrew Bree	Ireland	2:07.90	
45	H05 L2	Raouf Benabid	Algeria	2:09.82	
46	H05 L4	Francisco Picasso	Uruguay	2:10.25	
47	H05 L1	Kunakorn Yimsomruay	Thailand	2:11.05	
48	H06 L8	Andrew Mackay	Cayman Islands	2:11.15	
49	H05 L7	David Cartin	Costa Rica	2:11.31	
50	H05 L8	Marcos Burgos	Chile	2:11.86	
51	H05 L3	George Demetriades	Cyprus	2:11.87	
52	H05 L5	Yi-Khy Saw	Malaysia	2:11.88	
53	H04 L4	Khaly Ciss	Senegal	2:11.97	
54	H04 L6	Rehan Poncha	India	2:12.75	
55	H10 L8	Dmytro Nazarenko	Ukraine	2:14.05	
56	H04 L3	Carlos Melendez	El Salvador	2:14.80	
57	H03 L3	Youssef Hafdi	Morocco	2:14.81	
58	H04 L1	Jonathan Mauri	Costa Rica	2:14.92	
59	H02 L4	Kevin Hensley	Virgin Islands	2:15.74	
60	H03 L2	Ranui Teriipaia	Tahiti	2:15.86	
61	H03 L5	Dean Palacios	Northern Mariana Islands	2:16.56	
62	H03 L8	Roy Barahona	Honduras	2:16.91	
63	H04 L7	Obied Ahmed Al Jassimi	United Arab Emirates	2:17.02	
64	H02 L5	Kenny Roberts	Seychelles	2:17.10	
65	H04 L2	James Walsh	Philippines	2:17.22	
66	H03 L4	Sergey Tsoy	Uzbekistan	2:18.65	
67	H02 L7	Joao Matias	Angola	2:18.77	
68	H03 L6	Marc Dansou	Benin	2:20.29	
69	H03 L7	Seung Gin Lee	Northern Mariana Islands	2:20.56	
70	H02 L3	Fernando Medrano	Nicaragua	2:24.61	
71	H02 L1	Hei Meng Lao	Macau	2:24.81	
72	H03 L1	Daniel Kang	Guam	2:25.12	
73	H01 L6	Yann Lausan	Tahiti	2:27.33	
74	H04 L5	Aung Kyaw Moe	Myanmar	2:29.15	
75	H01 L4	Kin-Vincent Duenas	Guam	2:30.84	
76	H01 L5	Chisela Kanchela	Zambia	2:31.15	
77	H01 L3	Muzeya Muzyamba	Zambia	2:32.18	
78	H02 L6	Ahmed Ouattara Zie	Ivory Coast	2:40.79	
-	H08 L1	Diogo Yabe	Brazil	DQ	
-	-	Peter Mankoč	Slovenia	DNS	
-	-	Jean-Luc Razakarivony	Madagascar	DNS	
-	-	Nuno Rola	Angola	DNS	
