= Swimming at the 2000 Summer Olympics – Men's 200 metre individual medley =

Men's 200 metre individual medley at the Games of the XXVII Olympiad
- Venue: Sydney International Aquatic Centre
- Date: September 20, 2000 (heats & semifinals); September 21, 2000 (final)
- Competitors: 56 from 49 nations
- Winning time: 1:58.98 OR

Medalists
1st place, gold medalist(s)		Massimiliano Rosolino	Italy
2nd place, silver medalist(s)		Tom Dolan	United States
3rd place, bronze medalist(s)		Tom Wilkens	United States

The men's 200 metre individual medley event at the 2000 Summer Olympics took place on 20–21 September at the Sydney International Aquatic Centre in Sydney, Australia.

Massimiliano Rosolino blasted a new Olympic record to add Italy's third gold medal in swimming at these Games. He edged out U.S. swimmer Tom Dolan with a fastest split (33.52) on the breaststroke leg to take over the lead at the final turn, and hit the wall first in a sterling time of 1:58.98, clipping 0.93 seconds off a record set by Hungary's Attila Czene in Atlanta. Dolan, the defending champion in the 400 m individual medley four days earlier, became the first American to break a two-minute barrier, taking home the silver in a new national record of 1:59.77. Meanwhile, Tom Wilkens earned a bronze in 2:00.87, handing an entire medal haul for the U.S. team with a two–three finish.

Czene, the defending Olympic champion, finished outside the podium in fourth place with a time of 2:01.16. Netherlands' Marcel Wouda came up with a spectacular swim on the breaststroke leg, but fell short to fifth spot in 2:01.48. Wouda was followed in sixth by Germany's Christian Keller (2:02.02), and in seventh by France's Xavier Marchand (2:02.23). Finland's world record holder Jani Sievinen closed out the field with an eighth-place finish in 2:02.49.

== Records ==
Prior to this competition, the existing world and Olympic records were as follows.

World record	Jani Sievinen (FIN)	1:58.16	Rome, Italy	11 September 1994
Olympic record	Attila Czene (HUN)	1:59.91	Atlanta, United States	25 July 1996

The following new world and Olympic records were set during this competition.

Date	Event	Name	Nationality	Time	Record
21 September	Final	Massimiliano Rosolino	Italy	1:58.98	OR

== Results ==
=== Heats ===
Rank	Heat	Lane	Name	Nationality	Time	Notes
1	7	4	Massimiliano Rosolino	Italy	2:00.92	Q, NR
2	5	4	Tom Dolan	United States	2:01.55	Q
3	5	5	Marcel Wouda	Netherlands	2:01.89	Q
4	7	5	Curtis Myden	Canada	2:01.95	Q
5	5	6	Jani Sievinen	Finland	2:02.00	Q
6	5	3	Christian Keller	Germany	2:02.09	Q
7	6	4	Tom Wilkens	United States	2:02.21	Q
8	6	5	Matthew Dunn	Australia	2:02.44	Q
9	6	2	Cezar Bădiţă	Romania	2:02.48	Q, NR
10	5	2	Attila Czene	Hungary	2:02.66	Q
11	7	3	Robert van der Zant	Australia	2:02.77	Q
12	6	6	Xavier Marchand	France	2:02.86	Q
13	7	2	Jordi Carrasco	Spain	2:02.89	Q
14	6	3	Jens Kruppa	Germany	2:03.08	Q
15	5	7	Brian Johns	Canada	2:03.12	Q
16	6	7	Jiro Miki	Japan	2:03.33	Q
16	7	6	Terence Parkin	South Africa	2:03.33	
18	6	8	Peter Mankoč	Slovenia	2:03.45	
19	7	1	István Batházi	Hungary	2:03.63	
20	5	1	Theo Verster	South Africa	2:03.64	
21	7	8	Jan Vítazka	Czech Republic	2:03.66	NR
22	5	8	Ioannis Kokkodis	Greece	2:04.04	
23	4	4	Dean Kent	New Zealand	2:04.07	
24	4	2	Valērijs Kalmikovs	Latvia	2:04.18	
25	6	1	Xie Xufeng	China	2:04.67	
26	3	4	George Bovell	Trinidad and Tobago	2:04.68	
27	4	1	Michael Windisch	Austria	2:05.15	
28	4	8	Yves Platel	Switzerland	2:05.19	
29	2	3	Grigoriy Matuzkov	Kazakhstan	2:05.45	
30	7	7	Susumu Tabuchi	Japan	2:05.68	
31	4	5	Artem Goncharenko	Ukraine	2:05.98	
32	3	5	Oleg Pukhnatiy	Uzbekistan	2:06.01	
33	3	3	Han Kyu-chul	South Korea	2:06.42	
34	3	2	Arsenio López	Puerto Rico	2:06.49	
35	2	6	Jeremy Knowles	Bahamas	2:06.85	
36	4	3	Krešimir Čač	Croatia	2:07.04	
37	2	5	Javier Díaz	Mexico	2:07.28	
38	2	2	Aleksandar Miladinovski	Macedonia	2:07.45	
39	4	6	Michael Halika	Israel	2:07.53	
40	1	7	Andrei Pakin	Kyrgyzstan	2:07.88	
41	3	1	Stephen Fahy	Bermuda	2:07.92	
42	1	5	George Gleason	Virgin Islands	2:08.25	
43	4	7	Pathunyu Yimsomruay	Thailand	2:08.38	
44	3	6	Wu Nien-pin	Chinese Taipei	2:08.85	
45	2	4	Walter Dario Arciprete	Argentina	2:08.89	
46	2	7	Alex Fong	Hong Kong	2:09.00	
47	3	7	Andrei Zaharov	Moldova	2:09.13	
48	1	3	Đorđe Filipović	FR Yugoslavia	2:09.28	
49	2	1	Orel Oral	Turkey	2:09.51	
50	1	4	Felix Christiadi Sutanto	Indonesia	2:09.77	
51	3	8	Haitham Hassan	Egypt	2:09.92	
52	2	8	Francisco Picasso	Uruguay	2:10.97	
53	1	6	Georgios Dimitriadis	Cyprus	2:12.76	
54	1	1	Saad Khalloqi	Morocco	2:13.22	
55	1	2	Sultan Al-Otaibi	Kuwait	2:16.23	
56	1	8	Omar Abu Fares	Jordan	2:21.22	

=== Semifinals ===
==== Semifinal 1 ====
Rank	Lane	Name	Nationality	Time	Notes
1	4	Tom Dolan	United States	2:00.38	Q
2	3	Christian Keller	Germany	2:01.23	Q
3	2	Attila Czene	Hungary	2:01.56	Q
4	7	Xavier Marchand	France	2:01.81	Q
5	6	Matthew Dunn	Australia	2:01.95	
6	5	Curtis Myden	Canada	2:01.99	
7	1	Jens Kruppa	Germany	2:02.55	
8	8	Jiro Miki	Japan	2:03.90	

==== Semifinal 2 ====
Rank	Lane	Name	Nationality	Time	Notes
1	4	Massimiliano Rosolino	Italy	2:01.14	Q
2	5	Marcel Wouda	Netherlands	2:01.40	Q
3	3	Jani Sievinen	Finland	2:01.46	Q
4	6	Tom Wilkens	United States	2:01.51	Q
5	2	Cezar Bădiţă	Romania	2:02.02	
6	1	Jordi Carrasco	Spain	2:02.90	
7	7	Robert van der Zant	Australia	2:02.91	
8	8	Brian Johns	Canada	2:02.92	

=== Final ===
Rank	Lane	Name	Nationality	Time	Notes
1st place, gold medalist(s)	5	Massimiliano Rosolino	Italy	1:58.98	OR
2nd place, silver medalist(s)	4	Tom Dolan	United States	1:59.77	AM
3rd place, bronze medalist(s)	7	Tom Wilkens	United States	2:00.87	
4	1	Attila Czene	Hungary	2:01.16	
5	6	Marcel Wouda	Netherlands	2:01.48	
6	3	Christian Keller	Germany	2:02.02	
7	8	Xavier Marchand	France	2:02.23	
8	2	Jani Sievinen	Finland	2:02.49	
