= 1997 FINA Short Course World Championships – Men's 200m individual medley =

The finals and the qualifying heats of the men's 200 metres individual medley event at the 1997 FINA Short Course World Championships were held on the last day of the championships, on Sunday 20 April 1997 in Gothenburg, Sweden.

== Finals ==
RANK	FINAL A	TIME
	Matthew Dunn (AUS)	1:57.46
	Christian Keller (GER)	1:58.35
	Ron Karnaugh (USA)	1:59.12
4.	James Hickman (GBR)	1:59.49
5.	Xavier Marchand (FRA)	1:59.78
6.	Zane King (AUS)	2:00.63
7.	Jakob Andersen (DEN)	2:01.27
8.	Peter Mankoč (SLO)	2:02.55

RANK	FINAL B	TIME
9.	Theo Verster (RSA)	2:01.92
10.	Nate Dusing (USA)	2:02.21
11.	Mark Versfeld (CAN)	2:02.34
12.	Josef Horky (CZE)	2:02.53
13.	Marko Milenkovič (SLO)	2:02.77
14.	Michael Jacobson (SWE)	2:03.65
15.	Toshiaki Kurasawa (JPN)	2:03.70
16.	Oleg Pukhnatiy (UZB)	2:04.43

== Qualifying heats ==
RANK	HEATS RANKING	TIME
1.	Matthew Dunn (AUS)	1:59.25
2.	Zane King (AUS)	1:59.41
3.	Ron Karnaugh (USA)	1:59.65
4.	Xavier Marchand (FRA)	2:00.12
5.	James Hickman (GBR)	2:00.16
6.	Christian Keller (GER)	2:00.33
7.	Peter Mankoč (SLO)	2:00.73
8.	Jakob Andersen (DEN)	2:00.81
9.	Mark Versfeld (CAN)	2:01.16
10.	Jens Kruppa (GER)	2:01.78
11.	Theo Verster (RSA)	2:01.92
12.	Nate Dusing (USA)	2:02.75
13.	Toshiaki Kurasawa (JPN)	2:02.90
14.	Michael Jacobson (SWE)	2:03.03
15.	Josef Horky (CZE)	2:03.08
16.	Marko Milenkovič (SLO)	2:03.21
17.	Oleg Pukhnatiy (UZB)	2:03.33
18.	Jacob Carstensen (DEN)	2:03.51
19.	Andres Grasso (ARG)	2:03.53
20.	Valeri Kalmikovs (LAT)	2:03.75
21.	Adrian Andermatt (SUI)	2:04.08
22.	Alejandro Bermúdez (COL)	2:04.12
23.	Arsenio López (PUR)	2:04.44
24.	Andrei Perminov (RUS)	2:04.48
25.	Sandro Tomaš (CRO)	2:04.53
26.	Xie Xufeng (CHN)	2:04.87
27.	Terence Parkin (RSA)	2:04.90
28.	Kim Henriksen (NOR)	2:04.95
29.	Mauricio Cunha (BRA)	2:05.15
30.	Philip Weiss (CAN)	2:05.18
31.	Mark Kwok (HKG)	2:05.24
32.	Alex Miladinovski (MKD)	2:05.76
33.	Oleg Svetkovsky (UZB)	2:06.81
34.	Thomas Nore (NOR)	2:07.13
35.	Jeremy Knowles (BAH)	2:07.44
36.	Giedrius Rafanavicius (LTU)	2:07.48
37.	Gunter Rodríguez (CUB)	2:07.87

== See also ==
- 1996 Men's Olympic Games 200m Individual Medley
- 1997 Men's European LC Championships 200m Individual Medley
