= 1998 European Short Course Swimming Championships – Men's 200 metre individual medley =

The finals and the qualifying heats of the Men's 200 metres Individual Medley event at the 1998 European Short Course Swimming Championships were held on the second day of the competition, on Saturday 12 December 1998 in Sheffield, England.

== Finals ==
| RANK | FINAL | TIME |
|---|---|---|
| Gold medal | James Hickman (GBR) | 1:56.36 |
| Silver medal | Marcel Wouda (NED) | 1:56.51 |
| Bronze medal | Jani Sievinen (FIN) | 1:57.14 |
| 4. | Christian Keller (GER) | 1:57.94 |
| 5. | Serhiy Sergeyev (UKR) | 1:59.63 |
| 6. | Jan Vitazka (CZE) | 2:00.85 |
| 7. | Jakob Andersen (DEN) | 2:00.98 |
| 8. | Jordi Carrasco (ESP) | 2:01.08 |

== Qualifying Heats ==
| RANK | HEATS RANKING | TIME |
|---|---|---|
| 1. | Marcel Wouda (NED) | 1:58.58 |
| 2. | Jani Sievinen (FIN) | 1:58.85 |
| 3. | James Hickman (GBR) | 1:59.07 |
| 4. | Christian Keller (GER) | 1:59.41 |
| 5. | Serhiy Sergeyev (UKR) | 1:59.70 |
| 6. | Jan Vitazka (CZE) | 1:59.83 |
| 7. | Jordi Carrasco (ESP) | 1:59.88 |
| 8. | Jakob Andersen (DEN) | 2:00.30 |
| 9. | Robert Seibt (GER) | 2:00.51 |
| 10. | Tamás Kerékjártó (HUN) | 2:00.59 |
| 11. | Peter Mankoč (SLO) | 2:01.04 |
| 12. | Valerijs Kalmikovs (LAT) | 2:01.79 |
| 13. | Krešimir Čač (CRO) | 2:01.82 |
| 14. | Frederik Hviid (ESP) | 2:02.25 |
| 15. | Michael Halika (ISR) | 2:02.58 |
| 16. | Cédric Bavay (BEL) | 2:02.60 |
| 17. | Pertti Lenkkeri (FIN) | 2:02.62 |
| 18. | Lorenz Liechti (SUI) | 2:02.64 |
| 19. | Pavel Tomecek (CZE) | 2:02.97 |
| 20. | Kim Henriksen (NOR) | 2:03.24 |
| 21. | Peter Aronsson (SWE) | 2:03.31 |
| 22. | Aleksanda Miladinovski (MKD) | 2:03.77 |
| 23. | Dionysis Papadakis (GRE) | 2:03.93 |
| 24. | Marko Milenkovic (SLO) | 2:04.13 |
| 25. | James Harris (GBR) | 2:04.19 |
| 26. | Domenico Fioravanti (ITA) | 2:06.21 |
| 27. | Yves Platel (SUI) | 2:06.75 |
| 28. | Batiste Levaillant (FRA) | 2:06.76 |
