= Swimming at the 1997 European Aquatics Championships – Men's 4 × 200 metre freestyle relay =

The final of the Men's 4 × 200 m Freestyle Relay event at the European LC Championships 1997 was held on Wednesday 1997-08-20 in Seville, Spain.

== Results ==
RANK	FINAL	TIME
	GREAT BRITAIN; Paul Palmer; Andrew Clayton; Gavin Meadows; James Salter	7:17.56; 1:49.13; 1:49.38; 1:50.60; 1:48.45
	NETHERLANDS; Pieter van den Hoogenband; Mark van der Zijden; Martijn Zuijdweg; Marcel Wouda	7:17.84; 1:48.59; 1:49.81; 1:50.48; 1:48.96
	GERMANY; Lars Conrad; Christian Keller; Stefan Pohl; Steffen Zesner	7:18.86; 1:50.30; 1:49.33; 1:50.19; 1:49.04
4.	ITALY; Massimiliano Rosolino; Emanuele Idini; Emiliano Brembilla; Paulo Ghiglione	7:19.27; 1:49.13; 1:51.38; 1:47.86; 1:50.90
5.	POLAND; Dominik Matuzewicz; Bartosz Sikora; Maciej Kajak; Piotr Florczyk	7:31.45; 1:53.62; 1:52.88; 1:52.58; 1:52.37
6.	SWITZERLAND; Adrian Andermatt; Philippe Meyer; Fausto Marui; Alex Meischer-Jost	7:38.77; 1:53.81; 1:53.06; 1:56.41; 1:55.49
7.	SWEDEN; Anders Lyrbring; Max von Bodungen; Lars Frölander; Jonas Lundström	DSQ; 1:50.16; 1:51.50; 1:48.87; 1:52.43
—	RUSSIA	DNS

== See also ==
- 1996 Men's Olympic Games 4 × 200 m Freestyle Relay
- 1997 Men's World Championships (SC) 4 × 200 m Freestyle Relay
