= Swimming at the 1996 Summer Olympics – Men's 200 metre individual medley =

Men's 200 metre individual medley at the Games of the XXVI Olympiad
- Venue: Georgia Tech Aquatic Center
- Date: 25 July 1996 (heats & finals)
- Competitors: 39 from 31 nations
- Winning time: 1:59.91 OR

Medalists
1st place, gold medalist(s)		Attila Czene	Hungary
2nd place, silver medalist(s)		Jani Sievinen	Finland
3rd place, bronze medalist(s)		Curtis Myden	Canada

The men's 200 metre individual medley event at the 1996 Summer Olympics took place on 25 July at the Georgia Tech Aquatic Center in Atlanta, United States.

== Records ==
Prior to this competition, the existing world and Olympic records were as follows.

World record	Jani Sievinen (FIN)	1:58.16	Rome, Italy	11 September 1994
Olympic record	Tamás Darnyi (HUN)	2:00.17	Seoul, South Korea	25 September 1988

The following records were established during the competition:

Date	Round	Name	Nationality	Time	Record
25 July	Final A	Attila Czene	Hungary	1:59.91	OR

== Results ==
=== Heats ===
Rule: The eight fastest swimmers advance to final A (Q), while the next eight to final B (q).

Rank	Heat	Lane	Name	Nationality	Time	Notes
1	5	4	Jani Sievinen	Finland	2:01.05	Q
2	3	2	Marcel Wouda	Netherlands	2:01.21	Q, NR
3	3	5	Matthew Dunn	Australia	2:01.44	Q
4	5	5	Curtis Myden	Canada	2:01.50	Q
5	5	3	Greg Burgess	United States	2:01.93	Q
6	4	4	Tom Dolan	United States	2:01.99	Q
7	3	4	Attila Czene	Hungary	2:02.10	Q
8	4	6	Xavier Marchand	France	2:03.17	Q
9	5	6	Luca Sacchi	Italy	2:03.24	q
10	3	6	Tatsuya Kinugasa	Japan	2:03.42	q
11	4	7	Martin van der Spoel	Netherlands	2:03.75	q
12	4	5	Christian Keller	Germany	2:03.82	q
13	3	3	Stev Theloke	Germany	2:04.23	q
14	4	2	Jo Yoshimi	Japan	2:04.49	q
15	2	4	Serghei Mariniuc	Moldova	2:04.99	q
16	5	8	Ratapong Sirisanont	Thailand	2:05.18	q
17	5	2	Marcin Maliński	Poland	2:05.42	
18	2	5	Josef Horký	Czech Republic	2:05.45	
19	5	7	Petteri Lehtinen	Finland	2:05.51	
20	1	4	Walter Soza	Nicaragua	2:06.15	NR
21	2	3	Valērijs Kalmikovs	Latvia	2:06.16	
22	3	7	Attila Zubor	Hungary	2:06.24	
23	3	1	Sergiy Sergeyev	Ukraine	2:06.30	
24	2	2	Oleg Pukhnatiy	Uzbekistan	2:06.39	
25	2	6	Krešimir Čač	Croatia	2:06.97	
26	2	7	Kim Bang-hyun	South Korea	2:06.99	
27	2	1	Arsenio López	Puerto Rico	2:07.09	
28	4	3	Simon Coombs	Australia	2:07.31	
29	2	8	Mark Kwok Kin Ming	Hong Kong	2:07.61	
30	4	8	Denislav Kalchev	Bulgaria	2:08.16	
31	1	7	Aleksandr Savitsky	Kazakhstan	2:08.78	
32	5	1	Desmond Koh	Singapore	2:08.99	
33	1	2	Armando Serrano	Colombia	2:09.67	
34	4	1	Gerald Koh	Singapore	2:11.76	
35	1	5	Kire Filipovski	Macedonia	2:11.90	
36	1	3	Wan Azlan Abdullah	Malaysia	2:12.11	
37	1	6	Sultan Al-Otaibi	Kuwait	2:19.77	
	1	1	Hem Lumphat	Cambodia	DSQ	
	3	8	Peter Mankoč	Slovenia	DSQ	

=== Finals ===
==== Final B ====
Rank	Lane	Name	Nationality	Time	Notes
9	6	Christian Keller	Germany	2:02.90	
10	3	Martin van der Spoel	Netherlands	2:03.01	
11	4	Luca Sacchi	Italy	2:03.49	
12	2	Stev Theloke	Germany	2:03.94	
13	1	Serghei Mariniuc	Moldova	2:04.11	NR
14	5	Tatsuya Kinugasa	Japan	2:04.59	
15	8	Ratapong Sirisanont	Thailand	2:05.02	
16	7	Jo Yoshimi	Japan	2:05.42	

==== Final A ====
Rank	Lane	Name	Nationality	Time	Notes
1st place, gold medalist(s)	1	Attila Czene	Hungary	1:59.91	OR
2nd place, silver medalist(s)	4	Jani Sievinen	Finland	2:00.13	
3rd place, bronze medalist(s)	6	Curtis Myden	Canada	2:01.13	NR
4	5	Marcel Wouda	Netherlands	2:01.45	
5	3	Matthew Dunn	Australia	2:01.57	
6	2	Greg Burgess	United States	2:02.56	
7	7	Tom Dolan	United States	2:03.89	
8	8	Xavier Marchand	France	2:04.29	
