= Swimming at the 1996 Summer Olympics – Men's 400 metre individual medley =

Men's 400 metre individual medley at the Games of the XXVI Olympiad
- Venue: Georgia Tech Aquatic Center
- Date: 21 July 1996 (heats & finals)
- Competitors: 27 from 23 nations
- Winning time: 4:14.90

Medalists
| 1st place, gold medalist(s) | | Tom Dolan | United States |
| 2nd place, silver medalist(s) | | Eric Namesnik | United States |
| 3rd place, bronze medalist(s) | | Curtis Myden | Canada |

The men's 400 metre individual medley event at the 1996 Summer Olympics took place on 21 July at the Georgia Tech Aquatic Center in Atlanta, United States.

== Records ==
Prior to this competition, the existing world and Olympic records were as follows.

| World record | Tom Dolan (USA) | 4:12.30 | Rome, Italy | 6 September 1994 |
| Olympic record | Tamás Darnyi (HUN) | 4:14.23 | Barcelona, Spain | 27 July 1992 |

== Results ==
=== Heats ===
Rule: The eight fastest swimmers advance to final A (Q), while the next eight to final B (q).

| Rank | Heat | Lane | Name | Nationality | Time | Notes |
|---|---|---|---|---|---|---|
| 1 | 2 | 4 | Eric Namesnik | United States | 4:16.21 | Q |
| 2 | 4 | 6 | Marcel Wouda | Netherlands | 4:17.30 | Q, NR |
| 3 | 4 | 4 | Tom Dolan | United States | 4:17.66 | Q |
| 4 | 4 | 3 | Marcin Maliński | Poland | 4:18.34 | Q, NR |
| 5 | 4 | 5 | Curtis Myden | Canada | 4:18.43 | Q |
| 6 | 3 | 5 | Matthew Dunn | Australia | 4:19.51 | Q |
| 7 | 2 | 5 | Luca Sacchi | Italy | 4:19.63 | Q |
| 8 | 2 | 6 | Serghei Mariniuc | Moldova | 4:20.24 | Q |
| 9 | 3 | 4 | Jani Sievinen | Finland | 4:23.13 | q, WD |
| 10 | 2 | 2 | Frederik Hviid | Spain | 4:23.67 | q |
| 11 | 3 | 3 | Trent Steed | Australia | 4:24.39 | q |
| 12 | 2 | 3 | Toshiaki Kurasawa | Japan | 4:24.83 | q |
| 13 | 4 | 7 | Josef Horký | Czech Republic | 4:26.58 | q, NR |
| 14 | 3 | 2 | Tatsuya Kinugasa | Japan | 4:26.73 | q |
| 15 | 4 | 1 | Ratapong Sirisanont | Thailand | 4:26.99 | q, NR |
| 16 | 3 | 6 | István Batházi | Hungary | 4:27.37 | q |
| 17 | 2 | 1 | Alejandro Bermúdez | Colombia | 4:27.97 | q, NR |
| 18 | 3 | 7 | Valērijs Kalmikovs | Latvia | 4:28.04 | |
| 19 | 4 | 2 | Gergő Kiss | Hungary | 4:28.05 | |
| 20 | 2 | 8 | Mark Kwok Kin Ming | Hong Kong | 4:31.13 | |
| 21 | 4 | 8 | Kim Bang-hyun | South Korea | 4:31.16 | |
| 22 | 1 | 5 | Walter Soza | Nicaragua | 4:32.11 | NR |
| 23 | 2 | 7 | Krešimir Čač | Croatia | 4:34.02 | |
| 24 | 3 | 1 | Aleksandar Malenko | Macedonia | 4:34.06 | |
| 25 | 1 | 3 | Arsenio López | Puerto Rico | 4:34.81 | |
| 26 | 3 | 8 | Desmond Koh | Singapore | 4:36.87 | |
| 27 | 1 | 4 | Wan Azlan Abdullah | Malaysia | 4:38.95 | |

=== Finals ===
==== Final B ====
| Rank | Lane | Name | Nationality | Time | Notes |
|---|---|---|---|---|---|
| 9 | 4 | Frederik Hviid | Spain | 4:22.47 | |
| 10 | 3 | Toshiaki Kurasawa | Japan | 4:23.36 | |
| 11 | 2 | Tatsuya Kinugasa | Japan | 4:24.25 | |
| 12 | 7 | Ratapong Sirisanont | Thailand | 4:26.35 | NR |
| 13 | 8 | Alejandro Bermúdez | Colombia | 4:26.64 | NR |
| 14 | 6 | Josef Horký | Czech Republic | 4:28.39 | |
| 15 | 5 | Trent Steed | Australia | 4:29.35 | |
| | 1 | István Batházi | Hungary | DSQ | |

==== Final A ====
| Rank | Lane | Name | Nationality | Time | Notes |
|---|---|---|---|---|---|
| 1st place, gold medalist(s) | 3 | Tom Dolan | United States | 4:14.90 | |
| 2nd place, silver medalist(s) | 4 | Eric Namesnik | United States | 4:15.25 | |
| 3rd place, bronze medalist(s) | 2 | Curtis Myden | Canada | 4:16.28 | NR |
| 4 | 7 | Matthew Dunn | Australia | 4:16.66 | OC |
| 5 | 5 | Marcel Wouda | Netherlands | 4:17.71 | |
| 6 | 1 | Luca Sacchi | Italy | 4:18.31 | |
| 7 | 6 | Marcin Maliński | Poland | 4:20.50 | |
| 8 | 8 | Serghei Mariniuc | Moldova | 4:21.15 | |
