= Swimming at the 2000 Summer Olympics – Men's 400 metre individual medley =

Men's 400 metre individual medley at the Games of the XXVII Olympiad
- Venue: Sydney International Aquatic Centre
- Date: September 17, 2000 (heats & final)
- Competitors: 45 from 39 nations
- Winning time: 4:11.76 WR

Medalists
1st place, gold medalist(s)		Tom Dolan	United States
2nd place, silver medalist(s)		Erik Vendt	United States
3rd place, bronze medalist(s)		Curtis Myden	Canada

The men's 400 metre individual medley event at the 2000 Summer Olympics took place on 17 September at the Sydney International Aquatic Centre in Sydney, Australia.

U.S. swimmer Tom Dolan blistered the entire field, and broke a six-year-old world record to successfully defend his Olympic title in the event. Acknowledging a massive roar from an Australian crowd, Dolan pulled away from the field on the backstroke leg, and then opened up his lead to a powerful finish in a sterling time of 4:11.76. Dolan's teammate Erik Vendt came from last place on the first turn with a spectacular swim to take home the silver in 4:14.23, pulling off another top-two finish of the night for the Americans. Meanwhile, Canada's Curtis Myden managed to repeat his bronze from Atlanta four years earlier in 4:15.33, handing a second straight medal haul for North America in the event's history.

Leading earlier in the prelims, Italy's Alessio Boggiatto finished outside the podium by six-tenths of a second (0.60) in 4:15.93. South Africa's Terence Parkin, a deaf mute since birth, swam on the outside in lane eight, but pulled off a fifth-place effort in an African record of 4:16.92. He was followed in sixth spot by Australia's newcomer Justin Norris (4:17.87), and in seventh by Romania's Cezar Bădiță (4:20.91), who had been overshadowed in his presence by a doping ban before the start of the Games. In May 2000, Badita failed a doping test for a steroid nandralone when he competed at the Mare Nostrum meet in Barcelona, Spain. Japan's Shinya Taniguchi closed out the field to eighth place with a time of 4:20.93.

== Records ==
Prior to this competition, the existing world and Olympic records were as follows.

World record	Tom Dolan (USA)	4:12.30	Rome, Italy	6 September 1994
Olympic record	Tamás Darnyi (HUN)	4:14.23	Barcelona, Spain	27 July 1992

The following new world and Olympic records were set during this competition.

Date	Event	Name	Nationality	Time	Record
17 September	Final	Tom Dolan	United States	4:11.76	WR

== Results ==
=== Heats ===
Rank	Heat	Lane	Name	Nationality	Time	Notes
1	4	3	Alessio Boggiatto	Italy	4:14.26	Q, NR
2	6	4	Tom Dolan	United States	4:15.52	Q
3	4	4	Curtis Myden	Canada	4:16.35	Q
4	4	6	Cezar Bădiță	Romania	4:17.11	Q, NR
5	5	4	Erik Vendt	United States	4:17.15	Q
6	5	5	Justin Norris	Australia	4:17.36	Q
6	5	2	Shinya Taniguchi	Japan	4:17.36	Q, AS
8	5	6	Terence Parkin	South Africa	4:18.14	Q, AF
9	5	7	Jirka Letzin	Germany	4:18.63	
10	6	6	István Batházi	Hungary	4:18.85	
11	5	3	Michael Halika	Israel	4:19.97	
12	4	5	Matthew Dunn	Australia	4:20.31	
13	6	5	Susumu Tabuchi	Japan	4:20.76	
14	4	7	Johann Le Bihan	France	4:20.96	
15	6	3	Frederik Hviid	Spain	4:21.63	
16	4	1	Dean Kent	New Zealand	4:21.81	
17	3	2	Alexey Kovrigin	Russia	4:22.21	
18	3	6	Yves Platel	Switzerland	4:22.38	
19	6	1	Massimiliano Eroli	Italy	4:22.85	
20	5	1	Ioannis Kokkodis	Greece	4:23.19	
21	6	7	Xie Xufeng	China	4:23.33	
22	3	4	Serghei Mariniuc	Moldova	4:23.57	
23	3	5	Jan Vítazka	Czech Republic	4:23.81	
24	4	2	Simon Militis	Great Britain	4:24.38	
25	5	8	Jin Hao	China	4:24.56	
26	4	8	Michael Windisch	Austria	4:24.62	
27	2	2	Jani Sievinen	Finland	4:25.16	
28	3	7	Dmytro Nazarenko	Ukraine	4:25.26	
29	6	2	Owen von Richter	Canada	4:25.70	
30	3	1	Marko Milenkovič	Slovenia	4:26.62	
31	2	4	Jeremy Knowles	Bahamas	4:26.87	
32	6	8	Torwai Sethsothorn	Thailand	4:28.42	
33	3	3	Kim Bang-hyun	South Korea	4:28.56	
34	1	3	Alex Fong	Hong Kong	4:29.02	
35	3	8	Alejandro Bermúdez	Colombia	4:29.42	
36	2	3	George Bovell	Trinidad and Tobago	4:29.52	NR
37	2	7	Juan Carlos Piccio	Philippines	4:30.17	
38	2	5	Juan Veloz	Mexico	4:31.73	
39	2	8	Grigoriy Matuzkov	Kazakhstan	4:31.89	
40	1	4	Georgi Palazov	Bulgaria	4:35.92	
41	2	1	Wan Azlan Abdullah	Malaysia	4:36.90	
42	2	6	Sandro Tomaš	Croatia	4:38.31	
43	1	5	Oussama Mellouli	Tunisia	4:41.97	
44	1	6	Hsu Kuo-tung	Chinese Taipei	4:42.78	
45	1	2	John Tabone	Malta	4:53.12	

=== Final ===
Rank	Lane	Name	Nationality	Time	Notes
1st place, gold medalist(s)	5	Tom Dolan	United States	4:11.76	WR
2nd place, silver medalist(s)	2	Erik Vendt	United States	4:14.23	
3rd place, bronze medalist(s)	3	Curtis Myden	Canada	4:15.33	NR
4	4	Alessio Boggiatto	Italy	4:15.93	
5	8	Terence Parkin	South Africa	4:16.92	AF
6	1	Justin Norris	Australia	4:17.87	
7	6	Cezar Bădiță	Romania	4:20.91	
8	7	Shinya Taniguchi	Japan	4:20.93	
