= 1997 FINA Short Course World Championships – Men's 4 × 200 metre freestyle relay =

The finals and the qualifying heats of the Men's 4 × 200 metres Freestyle Relay event at the 1997 FINA Short Course World Championships were held on the second day of the competition, on Friday 18 April 1997 in Gothenburg, Sweden.

== Finals ==
Rank	Final	Time
	Australia; Michael Klim; Grant Hackett; Bill Kirby; Matthew Dunn	7:02.74 WR; 1:45.21; 1:45.61; 1:46.41; 1:45.51
	Sweden; Anders Lyrbring; Anders Holmertz; Lars Frölander; Fredrik Letzler	7:05.61
	Great Britain; Paul Palmer; Andrew Clayton; Mark Stevens; James Salter	7:05.81
4.	Germany	7:05.90
5.	Denmark	7:15.57
6.	United States	7:16.59
7.	Brazil	7:18.42
8.	New Zealand	7:19.81

== Qualifying heats ==
Rank	Heats	Time
1.	Germany	7:10.53
2.	Great Britain	7:11.13
3.	Australia	7:12.33
4.	Sweden	7:13.79
5.	United States	7:16.88
6.	Brazil	7:17.23
7.	Denmark	7:20.21
8.	New Zealand	7:21.56
9.	Canada	7:22.29
10.	Switzerland	7:25.61
11.	Venezuela	7:28.64
12.	Uzbekistan	7:33.44
13.	Chile	7:45.71
14.	South Africa	7:51.27

== See also ==
- 1996 Men's Olympic Games 4 × 200 m Freestyle Relay
- 1997 Men's European LC Championships 4 × 200 m Freestyle Relay
