= 1998 European Short Course Swimming Championships – Men's 100 metre individual medley =

The finals and the qualifying heats of the Men's 100 metres Individual Medley event at the 1998 European Short Course Swimming Championships were held on the first day of the competition, on Friday 11 December 1998 in Sheffield, England.

== Finals ==
RANK	FINAL	TIME
Gold medal	Jani Sievinen (FIN)	53.64
Silver medal	Jens Kruppa (GER)	54.00
Bronze medal	James Hickman (GBR)	54.45
4.	Marcel Wouda (NED)	54.64
5.	Christian Keller (GER)	55.10
6.	Peter Mankoč (SLO)	55.38
7.	Serhiy Sergeyev (UKR)	55.38
8.	Jakob Andersen (DEN)	55.41

== Qualifying Heats ==
RANK	HEATS RANKING	TIME
1.	Jani Sievinen (FIN)	54.19
2.	Marcel Wouda (NED)	54.38
3.	Jens Kruppa (GER)	54.71
4.	Christian Keller (GER)	54.98
5.	James Hickman (GBR)	55.12
6.	Serhiy Sergeyev (UKR)	55.49
7.	Peter Mankoč (SLO)	55.50
8.	Jakob Andersen (DEN)	55.74
9.	Cédric Bavay (BEL)	56.41
10.	Pavel Tomecek (CZE)	56.80
11.	Nick Poole (GBR)	56.82
12.	Nuno Laurentino (POR)	56.85
13.	Jordi Carrasco (ESP)	56.99
14.	Pertti Lenkkeri (FIN)	57.07
15.	Krešimir Čač (CRO)	57.11
16.	Lorenz Liechti (SUI)	57.19
17.	Valerijs Kalmikovs (LAT)	57.37
18.	Kim Henriksen (NOR)	57.48
19.	Tamás Kerékjártó (HUN)	57.57
20.	Peter Domanicky (SVK)	58.31
21.	Jiri Dub (CZE)	59.14
22.	Batiste Levaillant (FRA)	59.45
