= Saad Khalloqi =

Moroccan swimmer

Personal information
- Full name: Saad Khalloqi
- National team: Morocco
- Born: 14 May 1978 (age 48)
- Height: 1.83 m (6 ft 0 in)
- Weight: 74 kg (163 lb)

Sport
- Sport: Swimming
- Strokes: Individual medley

Saad Khalloqi (Arabic: سعد خلوقي; born May 14, 1978) is a Moroccan former swimmer, who specialized in individual medley events. Khalloqi qualified only for the men's 200 m individual medley at the 2000 Summer Olympics in Sydney by receiving a Universality place from FINA, in an entry time of 2:11.70. He challenged seven other swimmers in heat one, including Kuwait's four-time Olympian Sultan Al-Otaibi. He held off a challenge from Al-Otaibi to grab a sixth seed by a full body length of three seconds, in a scintillating time of 2:13.22. Khalloqi failed to advance into the semifinals, as he placed fifty-fourth overall in the prelims.
