= Đorđe Filipović =

Serbian swimmer

Personal information
- National team: Yugoslavia
- Born: 6 November 1978 (age 47) Belgrade, SR Serbia, SFR Yugoslavia
- Height: 1.85 m (6 ft 1 in)
- Weight: 82 kg (181 lb)

Sport
- Sport: Swimming
- Strokes: Butterfly, medley
- Club: PK April 11
- College team: Syracuse University (U.S.)
- Coach: Lou Walker (U.S.)

Đorđe Filipović (also Djordje Filipović, Serbian: Ђорђе Филиповић; born November 6, 1978) is a Serbian former swimmer, who specialized in butterfly and in individual medley events. He represented the former Federal Republic of Yugoslavia at the 2000 Summer Olympics, and earned nine Big East Conference titles for the Syracuse University swimming and diving team, while studying in the United States.

Filipovic, a former member of PK April 11 in Belgrade, attended the Syracuse University in Syracuse, New York, where he majored in information management and technology, and eventually graduated with honors in the spring of 2002. He also played for the Syracuse Orange swimming and diving team under head coach Lou Walker, and was served as the team's captain. While swimming for the Orange, Filipovic was a nine-time Big East Conference champion, awarding four titles in the 200-yard butterfly, three in the 200-yard individual medley, and two in the 100-yard butterfly since his official entry in 1998. In 2001, Filipovic was named Big East Conference's outstanding male swimmer of the year after smashing a meet record of 1:45.70 in the 200-yard butterfly.

A member of a defunct Yugoslav squad, Filipovic competed only in the men's 200 m individual medley at the 2000 Summer Olympics in Sydney. He achieved a FINA B-cut of 2:09.07 from the Akropolis Grand Prix in Athens. He challenged seven other swimmers in heat one, including Kuwait's four-time Olympian Sultan Al-Otaibi. Leading off into the breaststroke leg with a fastest split (38.45), Filipovic faded shortly to third place by a 1.7-second deficit from Kyrgyzstan's Andrei Pakin, winner of his heat, in 2:09.28. Filipovic failed to advance into the semifinals, as he placed forty-ninth overall in the prelims.
