= Kim Henriksen =

Kim Henriksen may refer to:

- Kim J. Henriksen (born 1960), Danish Esperantist singer-musician
- Kim Henriksen (equestrian), Danish rider in the 2012 FEI Nations Cup of Poland
- Kim Henriksen (swimmer), Norwegian swimmer in the 1998 European Short Course Swimming Championships
