= Jon Urbanchek =

American swimming coach (1936–2024)

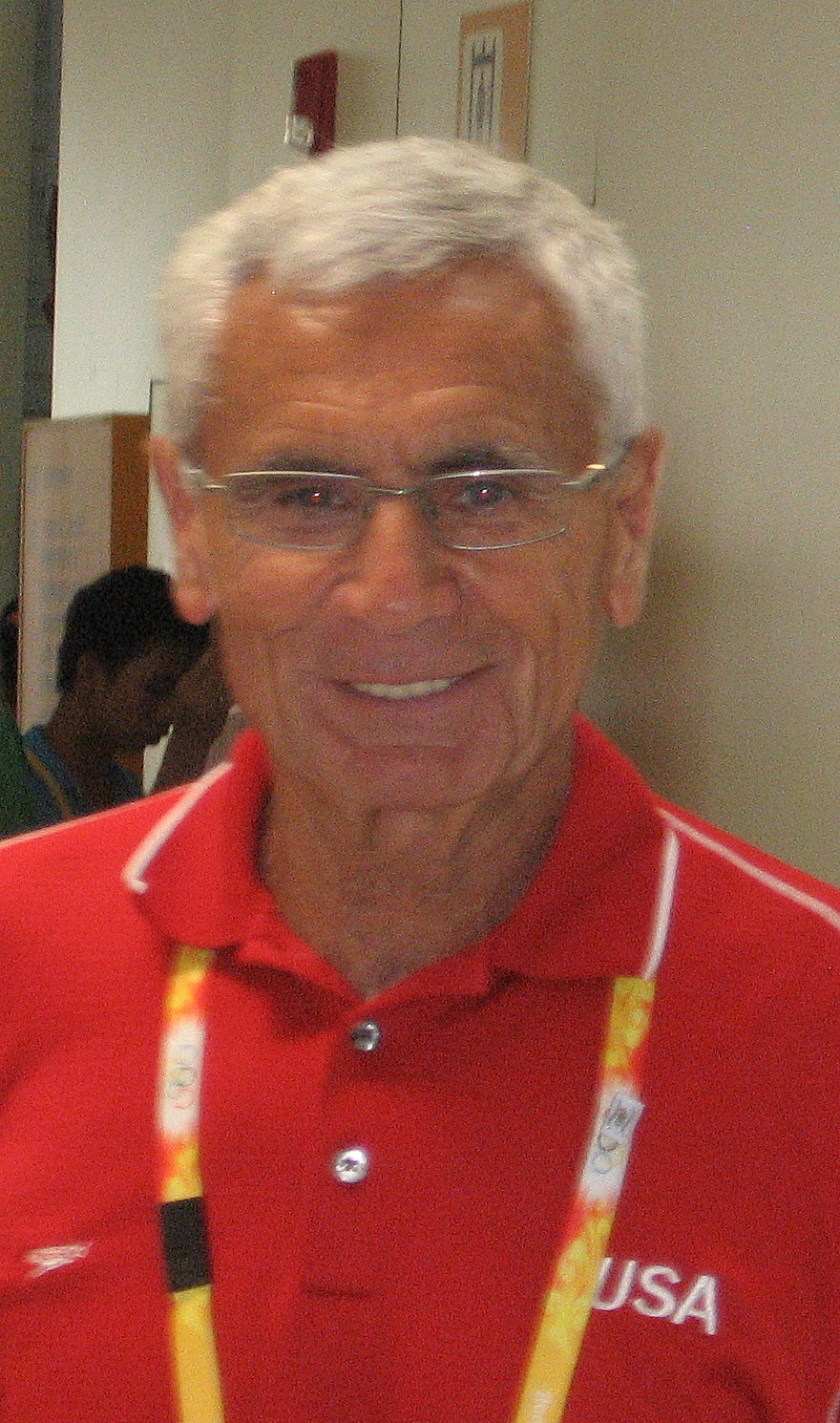
- Urbanchek at 71 in 2008

Biographical details
- Born: August 23, 1936; Szarvas, Hungary
- Died: May 9, 2024 (aged 87); Fullerton, California, U.S.
- Education: University of Michigan '62 BA; Chapman University '73 MA

Playing career
- 1959-1961: University of Michigan; Coach Gus Stager
- Position: freestyle

Coaching career (HC unless noted)
- 1963-1964: Garden Grove High School
- 1964-1978: Anaheim High School
- 1978-1982: Long Beach State
- 1982-2004: University of Michigan
- 2004-2009: Club Wolverine
- 2010-: Fullerton Area Swim Team (FAST); Coach and Administrator
- 2009-2020: University of Southern California

Head coaching record
- Overall: 163-34-0

Accomplishments and honors

Championships
- At Michigan: 1995 NCAA Championship; 13 Big Ten Championships (1986-1996)

Awards
- Pacific Coast Athl. Assoc. Coach of Year 1981; 1995 ASCA & NCAA Coach of the Year; 8 x Big 10 Coach of the Year; International Swimming Hall of Fame 2008; Michigan Sports Hall of Fame 2009.

Jon Urbanchek (born János Urbancsok; August 23, 1936 – May 9, 2024) was a Hungarian-born American swimming coach, best known for his 22-year tenure as the head coach of the Michigan Wolverines swimming and diving team of the University of Michigan from 1982 to 2004. During his coaching tenure, he led his Michigan teams to an NCAA team Championship in 1995, and a total of 13 Big Ten Championships. He has served as a coach on multiple United States national swim teams, including the U.S. Olympic swim teams in 1988, 1992, 1996, 2000, and 2004, and as a special assistant in 2008 and 2012. In five Olympics, Urbanchek coached a total of 44 Olympians to 20 Olympic medals, consisting of 11 gold, six silver, and four bronze.

== Early years ==
Born János Urbancsok on August 23, 1936, in Szarvas, Hungary, Jon Urbanchek, as he would be known, emigrated to the United States in 1957 around the age of 21 after the 1956 invasion of Hungary by the Soviet Union.

=== University of Michigan student ===
Graduating around 1962, he attended the University of Michigan on scholarship. At Michigan, Urbanchek was a member of the Michigan Wolverines swimming and diving team from 1959 to 1961, where he competed and trained under Hall of Fame Head Coach Gus Stager, a U.S. Olympic Coach and former competitive swimmer for Michigan. While swimming for Michigan in 1961, Urbanchek placed second nationally in the 1650-yard Freestyle, and received All-American honors in swimming in 1959 and 1961. He was a member of the Wolverines Varsity teams that won the 1959 and 1961 NCAA Men's Division I Swimming and Diving Championships.

== Career ==
=== Early career ===
After graduating from college around 1962, Urbanchek's worked as a health teacher and aquatics coach at Garden Grove High School in California, in 1963−64. In the fall of 1964, he started teaching at Anaheim High School, where he coached highly successful teams in both water polo and swimming. Highlights at AHS included a third-place finish in CIF water polo in 1969 and a CIF team finals appearance in boys swimming in 1970. In 1964, Urbanchek co-founded the Fullerton Aquatics Sports Team (FAST Swimming) in Fullerton, California. In 1973, he earned a master's degree in education from Chapman University.

Urbanchek left Anaheim High School in 1978 to become the head coach at Long Beach State, where he coached the 49ers swim program for five years. In 1981, he was named Pacific Coast Athletic Association Coach of the Year. He coached on the international level for the first time in 1979, guiding the United States to a second-place finish behind his native Hungary at the 1979 FINA Men's Water Polo World Cup.

=== University of Michigan Head Coach (1982–2004) ===
Urbanchek was responsible for the renaissance of the Michigan Men's swimming program after taking over the position in 1982. Within four years he won his first Big Ten Championship in 1986 and then continued to win another 9 in a row from 1986-1996, establishing a decade of dominance for the program. As a career high point, at the Indiana University Natatorium in 1995, he led Michigan to win the NCAA team Championship over rival Stanford. Dominant at the conference level, Urbanchek's Michigan teams won a total of 13 Big Ten Championships during his coaching tenure. His Michigan teams earned an enviable overall record of 163-34-0. Upon his retirement as Men's team head coach in 2004, he was replaced by Bob Bowman.

=== Olympians coached ===
Listed sequentially by Olympic year, top Olympic performers coached by Urbanchek include Brent Lang (1988), Mike Barrowman (1992), Eric Namesnik (1992 and 1996), and Tom Dolan (1992 and 1996). Those that participated in the Olympics in 2000 and 2004 included Tom Malchow (1996 and 2000), Gustavo Borges (1992 and 2000), Marcel Wouda (2000), Dan Ketchum (2004), Chris Thompson (2000), Peter Vanderkaay (2004). In five Olympics, Urbanchek helped train and mentor 44 Olympians, of which 26 were from the University of Michigan, to a total of 20 Olympic medals, consisting of 11 gold medals, six silver, and four bronze. His own University of Michigan swimmers combined for a total of 17 of the 20 medals his swimmers earned.

=== Later career ===
After leaving his position as Men's Head Coach at Michigan in 2004, Urbanchek continued to coach with Club Wolverine, the club team affiliated with the University through around 2009 and to assist the University's men's team as a Head of Aquatics.

Urbanchek returned to Southern California in 2010 to direct the U.S. Olympic Post-Graduate Training Center at Fullerton Aquatics (FAST Swimming). He coached two swimmers to gold medals at the 2012 Olympics (Tyler Clary and Matt McLean) and served as special assistant coach for the 2012 U.S. Olympic Swimming Team.

From 2009, until his full retirement in 2020, he assisted Head Coach Dave Salo with the swim team at the University of Southern California.

=== Personal life and death ===
Urbanchek and his wife, the former Melanie Silas, had a daughter.

Urbanchek died from Parkinson's disease at his home in Fullerton, California, on May 9, 2024, at the age of 87.

== Honors ==
Urbanchek was inducted into the Long Beach State Athletics Hall of Fame in 2004, and became a member of the International Swimming Hall of Fame (ISHOF) in 2008. In 2009, he was inducted into the Michigan Sports Hall of Fame.

In December 2019, the newly rebuilt pool at Anaheim High School was officially opened in his honor as the Jon Urbanchek Aquatics Complex.

== See also ==
- List of members of the International Swimming Hall of Fame
