= Swimming at the 1995 European Aquatics Championships – Men's 4 × 100 metre freestyle relay =

The final of the Men's 4 × 100 m Freestyle Relay event at the European LC Championships 1995 was held on 25 August 1995 in Vienna, Austria.

== Results ==
RANK	FINAL	TIME
	RUSSIA; Vladimir Predkin; Roman Shegolov; Roman Yegorov; Alexander Popov	3:18.84; 50.40; 49.59; 49.80; 49.05
	GERMANY; Christian Tröger; Christian Keller; Torsten Spanneberg; Björn Zikarsky	3:19.76; 50.31; 50.88; 48.42; 49.16
	SWEDEN; Lars Frölander; Christer Wallin; Fredrik Letzler; Anders Holmertz	3:21.07; 50.16; 50.76; 50.15; 49.98
4.	FINLAND	3:22.04
5.	NETHERLANDS; Pie Geelen; Mark Veens; Tim Hoeymans; Pieter van den Hoogenband	3:22.38; 51.20; 50.61; 50.98; 49.59
6.	FRANCE	3:22.57
7.	ROMANIA	3:23.83
8.	HUNGARY	3:23.86

== See also ==
- 1996 Men's Olympic Games 4 × 100 m Freestyle Relay
- 1995 Men's World Championships (SC) 4 × 100 m Freestyle
