= Gergő Kiss (swimmer, born 1977) =

Hungarian swimmer

Personal information
- Born: 12 May 1977 (age 49) Budapest, Hungary

Sport
- Sport: Swimming

Gergő Kiss (born 12 May 1977) is a Hungarian swimmer. He competed in the men's 400 metre individual medley event at the 1996 Summer Olympics.
