= Simon Coombs (swimmer) =

Australian swimmer

Personal information
- Full name: Simon Luke Coombs
- Born: 6 April 1976 (age 50) Melbourne, Australia

Sport
- Sport: Swimming
- Strokes: IM swimmer

Simon Coombs (born 6 April 1976) is an Australian swimmer. He competed in the men's 200 metre individual medley event at the 1996 Summer Olympics.
