= Marcel Wouda =

Dutch swimmer

Personal information
- Full name: Marcel Reinier Wouda
- Nationality: Dutch
- Born: 23 January 1972 (age 54) Tilburg, North Brabant, Netherlands
- Height: 2.03 m (6 ft 8 in)
- Weight: 92 kg (203 lb; 14.5 st)

Sport
- Sport: Swimming
- Strokes: Individual medley
- Club: Nationaal Zweminstituut Eindhoven
- College team: University of Michigan
- Coach: Jon Urbanchek (Michigan)
Medal record
Event	1st	2nd	3rd
Olympic Games	0	0	1
World Championships (LC)	1	2	0
World Championships (SC)	1	2	1
European Championships (LC)	5	1	3
European Championships (SC)	5	1	2
Total	12	6	7
Men's swimming
Representing the Netherlands
Olympic Games
Bronze medal – third place	2000 Sydney	4×200 m freestyle
World Championships (LC)
Gold medal – first place	1998 Perth	200 m medley
Silver medal – second place	1998 Perth	400 m medley
Silver medal – second place	1998 Perth	4×200 m freestyle
World Championships (SC)
Gold medal – first place	1999 Hong Kong	4×200 m freestyle
Silver medal – second place	1999 Hong Kong	400 m medley
Silver medal – second place	1999 Hong Kong	4×100 m freestyle
Bronze medal – third place	1999 Hong Kong	200 m medley
European Championships (LC)
Gold medal – first place	1997 Seville	200 m medley
Gold medal – first place	1997 Seville	400 m medley
Gold medal – first place	1999 Istanbul	200 m medley
Gold medal – first place	1999 Istanbul	4×100 m freestyle
Gold medal – first place	1999 Istanbul	4×100 m medley
Silver medal – second place	1997 Seville	4×200 m freestyle
Bronze medal – third place	1993 Sheffield	400 m medley
Bronze medal – third place	1999 Istanbul	400 m medley
Bronze medal – third place	2000 Helsinki	4×200 m freestyle
European Championships (SC)
Gold medal – first place	1996 Rostock	100 m medley
Gold medal – first place	1996 Rostock	200 m medley
Gold medal – first place	1996 Rostock	400 m medley
Gold medal – first place	1998 Sheffield	400 m medley
Gold medal – first place	1999 Lisbon	200 m medley
Silver medal – second place	1998 Sheffield	200 m medley
Bronze medal – third place	1999 Lisbon	100 m medley
Bronze medal – third place	1999 Lisbon	4×50 m freestyle

Marcel Reinier Wouda (born 23 January 1972) is a Dutch former swimmer, who became the first Dutch world champion in men's swimming when he won the world title in the 200 m individual medley at the 1998 World Aquatics Championships in Perth, Australia. He was the coach of Dutch Olympic champions Maarten van der Weijden and Hinkelien Schreuder at the Nationaal Zweminstituut Eindhoven.

== Swimming career ==
Wouda was born in Tilburg and grew up in Uden, where he joined the 'De Zeester' swimming club at a very young age. His trainers were Martien Swinkels and Rob Kennis, who brought him to the top of Dutch swimming. Wouda made his Olympic debut at the 1992 Summer Olympics, where he was the sole male in the Dutch squad with eight females ending 22nd in the 200 m individual medley and 19th in the 400 m individual medley.

Afterwards he moved to the United States, where he joined University of Michigan in Ann Arbor under the guidance of trainer-coach Jon Urbanchek, alongside swimmers like Eric Namesnik, Gustavo Borges and Tom Dolan. At the 1993 European Aquatics Championships in Sheffield he won the bronze medal in the 400 m individual medley.

Two years after he left Wouda moved back to the Netherlands, where trainer-coach Jacco Verhaeren brought him back to the top. Wouda got his second Olympic selection when he qualified for the 1996 Summer Olympics. There he finished in 4th place in the 200 m individual medley, 5th place in the 400 m individual medley, and 7th place in 4×200 m freestyle. At the 1997 European Aquatics Championships he became European champion in the 200 m and 400 m individual medley and won a silver medal in the 4×200 m freestyle together with Pieter van den Hoogenband, Mark van der Zijden and Martijn Zuijdweg.

=== World Aquatics Championships ===
At the 1998 World Aquatics Championships in Perth, Western Australia Wouda became world champion in the 200 m individual medley and won two silver medals in the 400 m individual medley and the 4×200 m freestyle relay alongside Van den Hoogenband, Van der Zijden and Zuijdweg. In April 1999 at the 1999 FINA World Swimming Championships (25 m) in Hong Kong, China Wouda won four medals. He became world champion in the 4×200 m freestyle alongside Pieter van den Hoogenband, Johan Kenkhuis and Martijn Zuijdweg. He won silver medals in the 1999 FINA World Swimming Championships (25 m) 400 m individual medley and the 1999 FINA World Swimming Championships (25 m) 4×100 m freestyle together with Mark Veens, Johan Kenkhuis and Pieter van den Hoogenband, in the 1999 FINA World Swimming Championships (25 m) 200 m individual medley he won a bronze medal. In the summer of 1999 Wouda took part in the 1999 European Aquatics Championships in Istanbul, Turkey. He successfully defended his title in the 1999 European Aquatics Championships 200 m individual medley and won the relay titles in the 1999 European Aquatics Championships 4×100 m freestyle, with Kenkhuis, Veens and van den Hoogenband, and the 1999 European Aquatics Championships 4×100 m medley with Klaas-Erik Zwering, Stefan Aartsen and van den Hoogenband. He also won the bronze medal in the Men's 400 metre individual medley.

On the road to the Sydney Olympics Wouda took part in the 2000 European Aquatics Championships in Helsinki, Finland where he won a bronze medal in the 4 × 200 m freestyle relay together with Martijn Zuijdweg, Mark van der Zijden and Pieter van den Hoogenband. Wouda won a bronze medal in the 4×200 m freestyle relay at the 2000 Summer Olympics in Sydney, Australia alongside Martijn Zuijdweg, Johan Kenkhuis and Pieter van den Hoogenband. Individually he ended 5th in the 200 m individual medley and 13th in the 100 m breaststroke. With the 4×100 m medley team he ended 4th just missing out for a medal alongside Klaas-Erik Zwering, Joris Keizer and Pieter van den Hoogenband. In the aftermath of the Sydney Olympics Wouda resigned from swimming. Six months later a journalist from Dutch daily NRC Handelsblad, Mark Hoogstad, wrote a book describing the resurrection of Dutch swimming at the hand of Wouda's career.

== Coaching career ==
Wouda was the head coach of Dutch junior swimming for two years, before being named assistant-coach of Verhaeren in Eindhoven, in October 2006. He guided Maarten van der Weijden to his world title in the 25 km and the Olympic title in the 10 km. He is also the coach of Hinkelien Schreuder who was part of the Dutch golden 4×100 m freestyle team and reached an individual 7th place in the 50 m freestyle at the Beijing Olympics in 2008.

=== Swimmers coached ===
- Maarten Brzoskowski
- Linsy Heister
- Job Kienhuis
- Robert Lijesen
- Allen Lindenberg
- Hinkelien Schreuder
- Bastiaan Tamminga
- Arjen van der Meulen
- Maarten van der Weijden
- Wendy van der Zanden
- Tom Vangeneugden
- Joeri Verlinden
- Maaike Waaijer

== See also ==
- Dutch records in swimming

Records
Preceded by (Finland) Jani Sievinen	Men's 400 metre individual medley world record holder (short course); 1 February 1997 – 24 September 1998	Succeeded by (Australia) Matthew Dunn
Awards
Preceded by Richard Krajicek	Dutch Sportsman of the Year; 1997	Succeeded by Gianni Romme
