= Hem Lumphat =

Cambodian swimmer (1976–2020)

Personal information
- Born: 4 December 1976 Phnom Penh, Cambodia
- Died: 15 July 2020 (aged 43) Phnom Penh, Cambodia

Sport
- Sport: Swimming

Hem Lumphat (4 December 1976 – 15 July 2020) was a Cambodian swimmer. He competed in the men's 200 metre individual medley event at the 1996 Summer Olympics.
