= 1999 FINA World Swimming Championships (25 m) =

- Host city: Hong Kong
- Opening: 1 April 1999
- Closing: 4 April 1999

The 4th FINA World Swimming Championships (25 m) was an international swimming meet organized by FINA, held 1–4 April 1999 at the Hong Kong Coliseum in Hong Kong. It features 516 swimmers from 61 nations, swimming in 40 short course (25 m pool) events.

== Participating nations ==
59 of 61 nations with swimmers at the 1999 Short Course Worlds were:

- Argentina
- Australia
- Barbados
- Belarus
- Belgium
- Brazil
- Canada
- China
- Chinese Taipei
- Costa Rica
- Croatia
- Cuba
- Czech Republic
- Denmark
- Ecuador
- Egypt
- El Salvador
- Estonia
- Fiji
- Finland
- France
- Germany
- Great Britain
- Greece
- Hong Kong
- Iceland
- Ireland
- Israel
- Italy
- Japan
- Kyrgyzstan
- Lithuania
- Luxembourg
- Macau
- Macedonia
- Malaysia
- Moldova
- Netherlands
- New Zealand
- Norway
- Peru
- Poland
- Portugal
- Puerto Rico
- Romania
- Russia
- Seychelles
- Singapore
- Slovakia
- Slovenia
- South Africa
- Spain
- Sweden
- Switzerland
- Trinidad and Tobago
- Ukraine
- USA
- Uzbekistan
- FR Yugoslavia

== Results ==
=== Men's events ===
Event	Gold		Silver		Bronze	
50 m Freestyle details	Mark Foster (United Kingdom) Great Britain	21.81	José Meolans; Argentina	21.84	Mark Veens; Netherlands	21.88
100 m Freestyle details	Lars Frölander; Sweden	47.05	Michael Klim; Australia	47.49	Bartosz Kizierowski; Poland	47.75
200 m Freestyle details	Ian Thorpe; Australia	1:43.28; WR	Michael Klim; Australia	1:43.78	Pieter van den Hoogenband; Netherlands	1:44.39
400 m Freestyle details	Grant Hackett; Australia	3:35.01; WR	Ian Thorpe; Australia	3:35.64	Massimiliano Rosolino; Italy	3:42.81
1500 m Freestyle details	Grant Hackett; Australia	14:32.87	Graeme Smith (United Kingdom) Great Britain	14:45.41	Daniel Kowalski; Australia	14:51.44
50 m Backstroke details	Rodolfo Falcón; Cuba	24.34	Mariusz Siembida; Poland	24.41	Matt Welsh; Australia	24.70
100 m Backstroke details	Rodolfo Falcón; Cuba	52.44	Matt Welsh; Australia	52.45	Mariusz Siembida; Poland	53.27
200 m Backstroke details	Josh Watson; Australia	1:54.67	Mark Versfeld; Canada	1:55.42	Sergey Ostapchuk; Russia	1:55.61
50 m Breaststroke details	Dmytri Kraevskyy; Ukraine	27.40	Patrik Isaksson; Sweden	27.57	Remo Lütolf; Switzerland	27.59
100 m Breaststroke details	Patrik Isaksson; Sweden	59.69	Domenico Fioravanti; Italy	59.88	Morgan Knabe; Canada	59.93
200 m Breaststroke details	Phil Rogers; Australia	2:08.72	Ryan Mitchell; Australia	2:08.73	Dmitri Komornikov; Russia	2:09.18
50 m Butterfly details	Mark Foster (United Kingdom) Great Britain	23.61	Zhang Qiang; China	23.87	Joris Keizer; Netherlands	23.96
100 m Butterfly details	Lars Frölander; Sweden	51.45	Michael Klim; Australia	51.56	James Hickman (United Kingdom) Great Britain	51.60
200 m Butterfly details	James Hickman (United Kingdom) Great Britain	1:52.71	Takashi Yamamoto; Japan	1:54.68	Denys Sylantyev; Ukraine	1:55.41
100 m I.M. details	Jani Sievinen; Finland	54.18	Matthew Dunn; Australia	54.77	Jacob Andersen; Denmark	55.05
200 m I.M. details	Matthew Dunn; Australia	1:55.81	James Hickman (United Kingdom) Great Britain	1:56.51	Marcel Wouda; Netherlands	1:58.63
400 m I.M. details	Matthew Dunn; Australia	4:06.05	Marcel Wouda; Netherlands	4:09.29	Frederik Hviid; Spain	4:10.92
4 × 100 m Free Relay details	Australia; Chris Fydler; Todd Pearson; Ian Thorpe; Michael Klim	3:11.21	Netherlands; Mark Veens; Johan Kenkhuis; Marcel Wouda; Pieter van den Hoogenband	3:11.57; ER	Sweden; Dan Lindström; Lars Frölander; Mattias Ohlin; Daniel Carlsson	3:12.69
4 × 200 m Free Relay details	Netherlands; Pieter van den Hoogenband; Johan Kenkhuis; Martijn Zuijdweg; Marcel Wouda	7:04.48; ER	(United Kingdom) Great Britain; Gavin Meadows; Sion Brinn; Paul Palmer; Edward Sinclair	7:07.20	Canada; Mark Johnston; Brian Johns; Rick Say; Yannick Lupien	7:08.02
4 × 100 m Medley Relay details	Australia; Matt Welsh; Phil Rogers; Michael Klim; Chris Fydler	3:29.88; WR	Sweden; Mattias Ohlin; Patrik Isaksson; Daniel Carlsson; Lars Frölander	3:30.32; ER	(United Kingdom) Great Britain; Neil Willey; Darren Mew; James Hickman; Sion Brinn	3:32.25

=== Women's events ===
Event	Gold		Silver		Bronze	
50 m Freestyle details	Inge de Bruijn; Netherlands	24.35; ER	Jenny Thompson (United States) USA	24.57	Alison Sheppard (United Kingdom) Great Britain	24.97
100 m Freestyle details	Jenny Thompson (United States) USA	53.24	Sandra Völker; Germany	53.76	Sue Rolph (United Kingdom) Great Britain	53.78
200 m Freestyle details	Martina Moravcová; Slovakia	1:56.11	Caini Qin; China	1:57.26	Josefin Lillhage; Sweden	1:57.46
400 m Freestyle details	Nadezhda Chemezova; Russia	4:05.23	Caini Qin; China	4:06.34	Joanne Malar; Canada	4:06.83
800 m Freestyle details	Hua Chen; China	8:20.13	Rachel Harris; Australia	8:23.36	Flavia Rigamonti; Switzerland	8:26.38
50 m Backstroke details	Sandra Völker; Germany	27.63	Mai Nakamura; Japan	27.73	Kellie McMillan; Australia	28.29
100 m Backstroke details	Mai Nakamura; Japan	58.67	Kelly Stefanyshyn; Canada	1:00.43	Erin Gammel; Canada	1:00.49
200 m Backstroke details	Mai Nakamura; Japan	2:06.49	Helen Don-Duncan (United Kingdom) Great Britain	2:08.18	Kelly Stefanyshyn; Canada	2:09.51
50 m Breaststroke details	Masami Tanaka; Japan	30.80	Penny Heyns; South Africa	30.88	Xue Han; China	31.24
100 m Breaststroke details	Masami Tanaka; Japan	1:06.38	Penny Heyns; South Africa	1:06.47	Samantha Riley; Australia	1:07.50
200 m Breaststroke details	Masami Tanaka; Japan	2:20.22; WR	Penny Heyns; South Africa	2:24.27	Qi Hui; China	2:25.05
50 m Butterfly details	Jenny Thompson (United States) USA	26.18	Anna-Karin Kammerling; Sweden	26.21	Inge de Bruijn; Netherlands	26.41
100 m Butterfly details	Jenny Thompson (United States) USA	57.65	Johanna Sjöberg; Sweden	57.74	Ayari Aoyama; Japan	58.29
200 m Butterfly details	Mette Jacobsen; Denmark	2:06.52; ER	Petria Thomas; Australia	2:06.53	Sophia Skou; Denmark	2:08.29
100 m I.M. details	Martina Moravcová; Slovakia	1:00.20; ER	Lori Munz; Australia	1:01.40	Oxana Verevka; Russia	1:01.55
200 m I.M. details	Martina Moravcová; Slovakia	2:08.55; ER	Yana Klochkova; Ukraine	2:10.67	Lori Munz; Australia	2:11.48
400 m I.M. details	Yana Klochkova; Ukraine	4:32.32	Joanne Malar; Canada	4:34.90	Lourdes Becerra; Spain	4:38.44
4 × 100 m Free Relay details	(United Kingdom) Great Britain; Alison Sheppard; Claire Huddart; Karen Pickering; Sue Rolph	3:36.88	Netherlands; Thamar Henneken; Wilma van Hofwegen; Chantal Groot; Inge de Bruijn	3:39.40	Australia; Lori Munz; Rebecca Creedy; Melanie Dodd; Sarah Ryan	3:39.82
4 × 200 m Free Relay details	Sweden; Josefin Lillhage; Louise Jöhncke; Johanna Sjöberg; Malin Svahnström	7:51.70; WR	(United Kingdom) Great Britain; Claire Huddart; Karen Legg; Nicola Jackson; Karen Pickering	7:53.98	Australia; Lori Munz; Jacinta van Lint; Rebecca Creedy; Giaan Rooney	7:55.81
4 × 100 m Medley Relay details	Japan; Mai Nakamura; Masami Tanaka; Ayari Aoyama; Sumika Minamoto	3:57.62; WR	Australia; Giaan Rooney; Samantha Riley; Petria Thomas; Lori Munz	4:00.37	Sweden; Therese Alshammar; Maria Östling; Johanna Sjöberg; Louise Jöhncke	4:00.84; ER

=== Medal standings ===
Rank	Nation	Gold	Silver	Bronze	Total
1	Australia (AUS)	9	11	7	27
2	Japan (JPN)	6	2	1	9
3	Great Britain (GBR)	4	5	4	13
4	Sweden (SWE)	4	4	3	11
5	United States (USA)	3	1	0	4
6	Slovakia (SVK)	3	0	0	3
7	Netherlands (NED)	2	3	5	10
8	Ukraine (UKR)	2	1	1	4
9	Cuba (CUB)	2	0	0	2
10	China (CHN)	1	3	2	6
11	Germany (GER)	1	1	0	2
12	Russia (RUS)	1	0	3	4
13	Denmark (DEN)	1	0	2	3
14	Finland (FIN)	1	0	0	1
15	Canada (CAN)	0	3	5	8
16	South Africa (RSA)	0	3	0	3
17	Poland (POL)	0	1	2	3
18	Italy (ITA)	0	1	1	2
19	Argentina (ARG)	0	1	0	1
20	Spain (ESP)	0	0	2	2
20	Switzerland (SUI)	0	0	2	2
Totals (21 entries)		40	40	40	120
