= Armando Serrano =

Colombian swimmer

Personal information
- Born: 5 May 1972 (age 54)

Sport
- Sport: Swimming

Armando Serrano (born 5 May 1972) is a Colombian swimmer. He competed in the men's 200 metre individual medley event at the 1996 Summer Olympics, placing 33rd.
