= Eric Namesnik =

American swimmer (1970–2006)

Personal information
- Full name: Eric John Namesnik
- Nickname: "Snik"
- National team: United States
- Born: August 7, 1970 Butler, Pennsylvania, U.S.
- Died: January 11, 2006 (aged 35) Ypsilanti, Michigan, U.S.
- Occupation: Swim coach
- Height: 6 ft 1 in (1.85 m)
- Weight: 172 lb (78 kg)
- Spouse: Kirsten Silvester

Sport
- Sport: Swimming
- Strokes: Individual medley
- Club: Club Wolverine
- College team: University of Michigan
- Coach: Jon Urbanchek (Michigan)
Medal record
Men's swimming
Representing the United States
Olympic Games
| Silver medal – second place | 1992 Barcelona | 400 m medley |
| Silver medal – second place | 1996 Atlanta | 400 m medley |
World Championships (LC)
| Silver medal – second place | 1991 Perth | 200 m medley |
| Silver medal – second place | 1991 Perth | 400 m medley |
| Bronze medal – third place | 1994 Rome | 400 m medley |
Pan Pacific Championships
| Gold medal – first place | 1991 Edmonton | 400 m medley |
| Silver medal – second place | 1989 Tokyo | 400 m medley |
| Silver medal – second place | 1991 Edmonton | 200 m medley |
| Silver medal – second place | 1995 Atlanta | 400 m medley |
Pan American Games
| Silver medal – second place | 1995 Mar del Plata | 200 m breast |
| Silver medal – second place | 1995 Mar del Plata | 400 m medley |
| Bronze medal – third place | 1995 Mar del Plata | 200 m medley |

Eric John Namesnik (August 7, 1970 – January 11, 2006), nicknamed "Snik," was an American competition swimmer who competed for the University of Michigan and a two-time Olympic silver medalist in the men's 400-meter Individual Medley (1992 & 1996).

== Early years ==
Namesnik was born and raised in the town of Butler, Pennsylvania, and swam for the Butler YMCA Swim team while he was growing up. He initially attended Butler Area Senior High School, transferring after his sophomore season to Spanish River Community High School in Boca Raton, Florida.

He accepted a swimming scholarship from the University of Michigan, to compete under coach Jon Urbanchek's Michigan Wolverines swimming and diving team from 1989 to 1993.

== Olympics 1992-96 ==
Namesnik represented the United States at two consecutive Olympic Games. At the 1992 Summer Olympics in Barcelona, Spain, he received his first Olympic medal, a silver, for his second-place performance in the men's 400-meter individual medley (4:15.57).

Four years later at the 1996 Summer Olympics in Atlanta, Georgia, he again finished second and received a silver medal in his signature event, the men's 400-meter individual medley (4:15.25).

=== Competition highlights ===
He also won a bronze medal in the 400-meter individual medley at the 1994 world championships, and two silvers at the 1991 world meet. He set a new American record in the 400-meter individual medley on four occasions.

=== Swim coaching ===
He spent seven years (1997-2004) as an assistant with the men's Michigan Wolverines swimming and diving team under coach Jon Urbanchek. He was a volunteer assistant coach at Eastern Michigan University for two years before his death and was a coach for Wolverine Aquatics Club in Ann Arbor, Michigan.

== Death ==
Namesnik died on January 11, 2006, from injuries sustained in a car accident the prior week. On January 7, 2006, he was critically injured in an accident that occurred when he attempted to pass another vehicle on an ice-covered road in Pittsfield Township, Michigan. He was survived by his wife, former swimmer Kirsten Silvester from the Netherlands, and their two children, Austin and Madison. His former club team, Club Wolverine, hosts the Namesnik Memorial Grand Prix every spring in his honor.

He is memorialized with a statue outside of the Butler County YMCA, along with his childhood coach John "Pump" McLaughlin.

== See also ==
- List of Olympic medalists in swimming (men)
- List of University of Michigan alumni
- List of World Aquatics Championships medalists in swimming (men)
