= Mark Stevens (swimmer) =

British swimmer

Personal information
- Full name: Mark Stevens
- National team: Great Britain
- Born: 25 March 1975 (age 51) Stoke-on-Trent, England, Great Britain
- Height: 1.98 m (6 ft 6 in)
- Weight: 108 kg (238 lb)

Sport
- Sport: Swimming
- Strokes: Freestyle
- Club: City of Cardiff Swim Club
Medal record
Men's swimming
Commonwealth Games
Representing England
| Silver medal – second place | 1998 Kuala Lumpur | 4×200 m freestyle |
| Bronze medal – third place | 1998 Kuala Lumpur | 4×100 m freestyle |
World Championships (SC)
Representing Great Britain
| Bronze medal – third place | 1997 Gothenburg | 4×200 m freestyle |

Mark Stevens (born 25 March 1975) is an English former competitive swimmer, who specialized in sprint and middle-distance freestyle events.

== Swimming career ==
He represented Great Britain in two editions of the Olympic Games, and later earned a total of three medals in freestyle relays at the 1997 FINA Short Course World Championships and at the 1998 Commonwealth Games. During his sporting career, Stevens trained for the City of Cardiff Swim Club in Cardiff, Wales.

Stevens made his Olympic debut at the 1996 Summer Olympics in Atlanta. A member of Team GB, he finished eighth in the 4×100 m freestyle relay (3:21.52), and fifth in the 4×200 m freestyle relay (7:18.74).

At the 1998 Commonwealth Games in Kuala Lumpur, Malaysia, Stevens captured two medals each for the English swimming squad: a silver in the 4×200 m freestyle relay (7:23.83), and a bronze in the 4×100 m freestyle relay (3:22.13).

Stevens competed only in the men's 4×100 m freestyle relay at the 2000 Summer Olympics in Sydney. Teaming with Paul Belk, Anthony Howard, and Jamaican-based Sion Brinn in heat three, Stevens swam the anchor leg and recorded a split of 50.16, but the Brits missed a chance to reach the top 8 final by 0.35 seconds, finishing in third place and ninth overall from the morning prelims with a time of 3:20.45.

He won the 2000 ASA National Championship 100 metres freestyle title.

== See also ==
- List of Commonwealth Games medallists in swimming (men)
