= Omar Abu Fares =

Jordanian swimmer (born 1984)

Personal information
- Full name: Omar Abu Fares
- National team: Jordan
- Born: 16 August 1984 (age 41) Amman, Jordan
- Height: 1.78 m (5 ft 10 in)
- Weight: 69 kg (152 lb)

Sport
- Sport: Swimming
- Strokes: Backstroke, medley

Omar Abu Fares (Arabic: عمر ابو فارس; born 16 August 1984) is a Jordanian former swimmer, who specialized in backstroke and individual medley events.

Abu Fares made his Olympic debut, as a 16-year-old, at the 2000 Summer Olympics in Sydney, where he competed in the men's 200 m individual medley. He rounded out the first heat to last place and fifty-sixth overall with a slowest time of 2:21.22.

At the 2004 Summer Olympics in Athens, Abu Fares qualified for his second Jordanian squad in the men's 100 m backstroke by receiving a Universality place from FINA in an invitation time of 1:00.34. Abu Fares still maintained his record for being one of the slowest swimmers from the preliminaries, as he finished the same heat in a time of 1:02.36.
