= Gavin Meadows =

British swimmer (born 1977)

Personal information
- Full name: Gavin Meadows
- Nationality: British
- Born: 8 September 1977 (age 48) Bradford, West Yorkshire
- Height: 1.91 m (6 ft 3 in)
- Weight: 82 kg (181 lb)

Sport
- Sport: Swimming
- Strokes: Freestyle
- Club: City of Leeds Swim Club
Medal record
Representing Great Britain
World Championships (LC)
Bronze medal – third place	1998 Perth	4×200 m freestyle
World Championships (SC)
Silver medal – second place	1999 Hong Kong	4×200 m freestyle
European Championships (LC)
Gold medal – first place	1997 Seville	4×200 m freestyle
Silver medal – second place	1999 Istanbul	4×200 m freestyle
Representing England
Commonwealth Games (LC)
Silver medal – second place	1998 Kuala Lumpur	4×200 m freestyle
Silver medal – second place	1998 Kuala Lumpur	4×100 m medley
Bronze medal – third place	1998 Kuala Lumpur	100 m freestyle
Bronze medal – third place	1998 Kuala Lumpur	4×100 m freestyle

Gavin Meadows (born 8 September 1977 in Bradford, West Yorkshire) is a former international freestyle swimmer for England and Great Britain.

== Early life ==
He attended Bruntcliffe High School.

== Swimming career ==
Meadows competed at the 2004 Summer Olympics for Great Britain. A member of the City of Leeds Swim Club he is best known for winning the 1997 European title in the men's 4×200 m freestyle relay, alongside Paul Palmer, Andrew Clayton and James Salter.

He represented England in six events and won four medals, at the 1998 Commonwealth Games in Kuala Lumpur, Malaysia. Three of the medals came in the relay events and he also won an individual bronze in the 100 metres freestyle.

He is a three times winner of the ASA National Championship 100 metres freestyle title (1996, 1997, 1999) and won the 200 metres freestyle in 1996.

== See also ==
- List of Commonwealth Games medallists in swimming (men)
