= Walter Soza =

Nicaraguan swimmer (born 1972)

Personal information
- Born: 13 October 1972 (age 53)

Sport
- Sport: Swimming

Walter Soza (born 13 October 1972) is a Nicaraguan swimmer. He competed in three events at the 1996 Summer Olympics.
