= Martijn Zuijdweg =

Dutch swimmer

Personal information
- Born: 16 November 1976 (age 49) Rotterdam, The Netherlands
Medal record
Men's swimming
Representing the Netherlands
Olympic Games
Bronze medal – third place	2000 Sydney	4×200 m freestyle
World Championships (LC)
Silver medal – second place	1998 Perth	4×200 m freestyle
World Championships (SC)
Gold medal – first place	1999 Hong Kong	4×200 m freestyle
European Championships (LC)
Silver medal – second place	1997 Seville	4×200 m freestyle
Bronze medal – third place	1997 Seville	4×100 m freestyle
Bronze medal – third place	2000 Helsinki	4×200 m freestyle

Martijn Hendrik Zuijdweg (born 16 November 1976 in Rotterdam) is a former freestyle swimmer from the Netherlands, who was a member of the Dutch 4×200 m freestyle relay team that won the bronze medal at the 2000 Summer Olympics in Sydney, Australia. He did so alongside Johan Kenkhuis, Marcel Wouda and Pieter van den Hoogenband.

== See also ==
- Dutch records in swimming
