= Stefan Pohl =

German swimmer

Personal information
- Born: 10 April 1978 (age 48) Merseburg, Germany

Sport
- Sport: Swimming
Medal record
Representing Germany
European Championships
Gold medal – first place	1999 Istanbul	4x200m freestyle relay
Silver medal – second place	2000 Helsinki	4x200m freestyle relay
Silver medal – second place	2002 Berlin	4x200m freestyle relay
Bronze medal – third place	1997 Seville	4x200m freestyle relay

Stefan Pohl (born 10 April 1978) is a German former swimmer who competed in the 2000 Summer Olympics.
