= Sultan Al-Otaibi =

Kuwaiti swimmer

Personal information
- Full name: Sultan Al-Otaibi
- National team: Kuwait
- Born: 21 May 1970 (age 56) Kuwait City, Kuwait
- Height: 1.73 m (5 ft 8 in)
- Weight: 73 kg (161 lb)

Sport
- Sport: Swimming
- Strokes: Backstroke, breaststroke, butterfly, medley

Sultan Al-Otaibi (Arabic: سلطان العتيبي; born May 21, 1970) is a Kuwaiti former swimmer, who specialized in individual medley, but also competed in backstroke, breaststroke, and butterfly. He represented Kuwait in all of the four editions of the Olympic Games since 1988, and also held numerous Kuwaiti records in the same disciplines, particularly in the 200 m individual medley.

Al-Otaibi made his official debut, as an 18-year-old, at the 1988 Summer Olympics in Seoul. He failed to reach the top 16 final in any of his individual events; finishing thirty-eighth in the 200 m butterfly (2:12.89), forty-second in the 200 m individual medley (2:15.63), and thirty-first in the 400 m individual medley (4:50.16), his best all-time Olympic result. Al-Otaibi also competed at the 1992 Summer Olympics in Barcelona, and at the 1996 Summer Olympics in Atlanta, but finished outside the top 25 field in most of his swimming events, including the 200 m individual medley.

Twelve years after competing in his first Olympics, Al-Otaibi qualified for his fourth Kuwaiti team in the men's 200 m individual medley, as a 30-year-old, at the 2000 Summer Olympics in Sydney. He achieved a FINA B-cut of 2:09.22 from the Asian Swimming Championships in Busan, South Korea. Swimming in heat one, Al-Otaibi posted a time of 2:16.23 to easily escape from last place to a seventh seed over Jordan's 16-year-old Omar Abu Fares. Al-Otaibi failed to advance into the semifinals, as he placed fifty-fifth overall in the prelims.
