= Toshiaki Kurasawa =

Japanese swimmer (born 1976)

Personal information
- Born: April 21, 1976 (age 50)

Sport
- Sport: Swimming
Medal record
Representing Japan
Summer Universiade
Bronze medal – third place	1997 Sicily	200m individual medley

Toshiaki Kurasawa (倉澤 利彰, Kurasawa Toshiaki) (born April 21, 1976) is a retired Japanese male freestyle and medley swimmer. He represented his Japan in two consecutive Summer Olympics, starting in 1992. His best Olympic result was the 10th place (4:23.36) in the Men's 400m Individual Medley event at the 1996 Summer Olympics.
