= James Salter (swimmer) =

British swimmer (born 1976)

Personal information
- Full name: James Matthew Salter
- Nationality: British
- Born: 18 March 1976 (age 50) Bromsgrove, Worcestershire
- Height: 1.82 m (6 ft 0 in)
- Weight: 77 kg (170 lb)

Sport
- Sport: Swimming
- Strokes: Freestyle
Medal record
Representing Great Britain
World Championships (LC)
Bronze medal – third place	1998 Perth	4×200 m freestyle
World Championships (SC)
Silver medal – second place	2000 Athens	4×200 m freestyle
Bronze medal – third place	1997 Gothenburg	4×200 m freestyle
European Championships (LC)
Gold medal – first place	1997 Seville	4×200 m freestyle
Silver medal – second place	1999 Istanbul	4×200 m freestyle
European Championships (SC)
Bronze medal – third place	1999 Lisbon	400 m freestyle
Representing England
Commonwealth Games
Bronze medal – third place	1994 Victoria	4×200 m freestyle
Silver medal – second place	1998 Kuala Lumpur	4×200 m freestyle
Bronze medal – third place	2002 Manchester	4×200 m freestyle

James Matthew Salter (born 18 March 1976) is a former international freestyle swimmer for England and Great Britain.

== Swimming career ==
He trained with the City of Edinburgh Swimming Club, Scotland under coach Tim Jones. Salter twice competed at the Summer Olympics (1996 and 2000) for Great Britain. He is best known for winning the 1997 European title in the men's 4×200 m freestyle relay, alongside Paul Palmer, Andrew Clayton and Gavin Meadows. He represented England and won a bronze medal in the freestyle relay event, at the 1994 Commonwealth Games in Victoria, British Columbia, Canada. Four years later he represented England again winning a silver medal in the same event. A third Games appearance came in 2002 where he also won a third freestyle relay medal.

He is a four times winner of the British Championship in 200 metres freestyle (1994, 1997, 2003, 2004) and twice 400 metres freestyle champion in 2002 and 2003.

== See also ==
- List of Commonwealth Games medallists in swimming (men)
