= Trent Steed =

Australian swimmer

Personal information
- Full name: Trent Joseph Steed
- National team: Australia
- Born: 6 May 1977 (age 49) Sydney, New South Wales
- Height: 1.75 m (5 ft 9 in)
- Weight: 66 kg (146 lb)

Sport
- Sport: Swimming
- Strokes: Medley
- Club: Campbelltown Swim Club
Medal record
Men's swimming
Representing Australia
Pan Pacific Championships
Bronze medal – third place	1997 Fukuoka	400 m medley
Commonwealth Games
Gold medal – first place	1998 Kuala Lumpur	400 m medley

Trent Joseph Steed (born 6 May 1977) is a former medley swimmer who competed for Australia at the 1996 Summer Olympics in Atlanta. There he finished in 15th position in the 400-metre individual medley, clocking a time of 4:29.35 in the B-Final. He was an Australian Institute of Sport scholarship holder.

== See also ==
- List of Commonwealth Games medallists in swimming (men)
