= Andrew Clayton =

British swimmer (born 1973)

Personal information
- Full name: Andrew Clayton
- National team: Great Britain
- Born: 10 April 1973 (age 53) Bradford, England
- Height: 1.91 m (6 ft 3 in)
- Weight: 89 kg (196 lb; 14.0 st)

Sport
- Sport: Swimming
- Strokes: Freestyle
Medal record
Men's swimming
Representing Great Britain
World Championships (LC)
Bronze medal – third place	1998 Perth	4×200 m freestyle
European Championships (LC)
Gold medal – first place	1997 Seville	4×200 m freestyle
European Championships (SC)
Silver medal – second place	1996 Rostock	200 m freestyle
Representing England
Commonwealth Games
Silver medal – second place	1998 Kuala Lumpur	4x200 m freestyle
Bronze medal – third place	1994 Victoria	4x200 m freestyle
Bronze medal – third place	1994 Victoria	4x100 m freestyle

Andrew Clayton (born 10 April 1973) is a male English former competition swimmer.

== Swimming career ==
Clayton represented Great Britain in the Olympics, both the World championships and European championships, and he swam for England in the Commonwealth Games. Clayton twice competed at the Summer Olympics during 1996 and 2000 for Great Britain. He is best known for winning the 1997 European title in the men's 4×200 meter freestyle relay, alongside Paul Palmer, James Salter and Gavin Meadows. At the CASA National British Championships he won the 100 meter butterfly title in 1995.

He also represented England and won two bronze medals in the relay events, at the 1994 Commonwealth Games in Victoria, and in British Columbia, Canada. He also competed for England, at the 1998 Commonwealth Games in Kuala Lumpur, Malaysia, winning a silver medal.

== See also ==
- List of Commonwealth Games medalists in swimming (men)
