= Aleksandar Miladinovski =

Macedonian swimmer (born 1979)

Personal information
- Full name: Aleksandar Miladinovski
- National team: North Macedonia
- Born: 4 August 1979 (age 46) Skopje, Socialist Republic of Macedonia, Socialist Federal Republic of Yugoslavia
- Height: 1.78 m (5 ft 10 in)
- Weight: 73 kg (161 lb)

Sport
- Sport: Swimming
- Strokes: Butterfly, medley
- Club: SC Vardar – Skopje (1988-1992); ASC Student – Skopje (1992- 2004)
- Coach: Dimitrija Popovski

Aleksandar Miladinovski (Macedonian: Александар Миладиновски; born August 4, 1979) is a Macedonian former swimmer, who specialized in butterfly and individual medley events. He represented the Republic of Macedonia in two editions of the Olympic Games (2000 and 2004), and held five Macedonian records in the butterfly (50 and 100 m) and individual medley (100 and 200 m).

Miladinovski made his first Macedonian team at the 2000 Summer Olympics in Sydney. He finished forty-first in the 100 m butterfly (55.62), and thirty-eighth in the 200 m individual medley (2:07.45).

At the 2004 Summer Olympics in Athens, Miladinovski maintained his program, competing again in two swimming events. He cleared FINA B-standard entry times of 55.23 (100 m butterfly) and 2:07.38 (200 m individual medley) from the World Championships in Barcelona, Spain. In the 200 m individual medley, Miladinovski challenged seven other swimmers in heat two, including Olympic veterans Orel Oral of Turkey and Oleg Pukhnatiy of Uzbekistan. He raced to third place and thirty-eighth overall by 0.26 of a second ahead of Cayman Islands' Andrew Mackay in 2:07.39. In the 100 m butterfly, Miladinovski placed forty-fifth overall on the morning's preliminaries. Swimming in heat three, he edged out Peru's Juan Pablo Valdivieso to notch a fifth spot by 0.27 of a second in 55.71.

Throughout his swimming career, he competed at seven World championships and eleven European championships including three European junior championships. Aleksandar has competed at five World cups and two University Games. He was a multiple Balkan Games medalist and a Balkan record holder. Overall, he has won more than 200 medals and a variety of trophies for his swimming achievements. Miladinovski best placing was at the World Championships in Athens 2000 where he placed 14th in 400m Individual Medley and 16th in the 200m Individual Medley.

After concluding his swimming career he continued working as an educator in international schools around Asia and the Middle East. He started working at Repton School Dubai where he spent six years as Head of Aquatics. His next station after Dubai was Wellington College International Shanghai where he worked as Aquatics Director for four years. Currently, he is working as an Aquatics specialist at Shanghai American School Pudong Campus.
