= Tom Dolan (swimmer) =

American swimmer (born 1975)

Personal information
- Full name: Thomas Fitzgerald Dolan
- National team: United States
- Born: September 15, 1975 (age 50) Arlington County, Virginia, U.S.
- Height: 6 ft 7 in (2.01 m)
- Weight: 190 lb (86 kg)

Sport
- Sport: Swimming
- Strokes: Individual medley
- Club: Nation's Capital Swim Club; Club Wolverine
- College team: University of Michigan
- Coach: Rick Curl (Nation's Capital SC); Jon Urbanchek (Michigan)
Medal record
Men's swimming
Representing the United States
Olympic Games
Gold medal – first place	1996 Atlanta	400 m medley
Gold medal – first place	2000 Sydney	400 m medley
Silver medal – second place	2000 Sydney	200 m medley
World Championships (LC)
Gold medal – first place	1994 Rome	400 m medley
Gold medal – first place	1998 Perth	400 m medley
Pan Pacific Championships
Gold medal – first place	1995 Atlanta	200 m medley
Gold medal – first place	1995 Atlanta	400 m medley
Silver medal – second place	1993 Kobe	400 m medley

Thomas Fitzgerald Dolan (born September 15, 1975) is an American former competition swimmer, two-time Olympic champion, and former world record-holder.

Dolan was born September 15, 1975 in Arlington, Virginia and attended Yorktown High School, where he was a swimming team standout. Dolan needed to overcome childhood asthma, which impacted his swimming by 12, sometimes causing him to lose consciousness during his college workouts. In High School, he swam for Head Coach Rick Curl of the Curl-Burke Swim Club, later known as the Nation's Capital Swim Club.

== University of Michigan ==
He attended the University of Michigan, Ann Arbor, where he swam for coach Jon Urbanchek's Michigan Wolverines swimming and diving team in National Collegiate Athletic Association (NCAA) competition from 1994 to 1997. During his college swimming career, he won individual NCAA national championships in the 500-yard freestyle (1995, 1996), 1,650-yard freestyle (1995, 1996), and 400-yard individual medley (1995, 1996), and was a member of three of Michigan's winning teams in the 800-yard freestyle relay (1994, 1995, 1996).

== Olympics 1996-2000 ==
Dolan represented the United States at two consecutive Summer Olympics. At the 1996 Summer Olympics in Atlanta, Georgia, he won a gold medal in the men's 400-meter individual medley, finishing with a time 4:14.90. He also competed in the men's 200-meter individual medley, placing seventh in the event final with a time 2:03.89.

Four years later at the 2000 Summer Olympics in Sydney, Australia, Dolan again won a gold medal in the men's 400-meter individual medley, and setting a new world record of 4:11.76 in the final. He also received the silver medal for his second-place performance in the men's 200-meter individual medley (1:59.77).

=== Honors ===
Dolan was inducted into the International Swimming Hall of Fame as an "Honor Swimmer" in 2006, and the Virginia Sports Hall of Fame in 2009.

He has operated the Tom Dolan Swim School in Northern Virginia, teaching infants to adults fundamentals that are essential for water safety, recreational swimming, and competitive swimming.

== See also ==
- List of members of the International Swimming Hall of Fame
- List of Olympic medalists in swimming (men)
- List of University of Michigan alumni
- List of World Aquatics Championships medalists in swimming (men)
- World record progression 400 metres individual medley

Records
Preceded by Tamás Darnyi	Men's 400-meter individual medley world record-holder (long course); September 11, 1994 – August 15, 2002	Succeeded by Michael Phelps
