= Mark van der Zijden =

Dutch swimmer (born 1973)

Personal information
- Born: Mark Richard van der Zijden; 22 October 1973 (age 52) Boskoop, Netherlands
- Height: 186 cm (6 ft 1 in)
- Weight: 79 kg (174 lb; 12 st 6 lb)
Medal record
Men's swimming
Representing the Netherlands
Olympic Games
| Bronze medal – third place | 2000 Sydney | 4×200 m freestyle |
World Championships (LC)
| Silver medal – second place | 1998 Perth | 4×200 m freestyle |
European LC Championships
| Silver medal – second place | 1997 Seville | 4×200 m freestyle |
| Bronze medal – third place | 2000 Helsinki | 4×200 m freestyle |

Mark Richard van der Zijden (born 22 October 1973) is a Dutch freestyle and medley swimmer, who swam in the qualifying heats of the bronze winning 4×200 m freestyle relay team at the 2000 Summer Olympics in Sydney, Australia. Four years earlier, when Atlanta, Georgia hosted the Games, Van der Zijden became seventh in the same event.
