= Sandro Tomaš =

Croatian swimmer

Sandro Santa Tomas
Personal information
- Nationality: Croatia
- Born: 9 October 1972 (age 53) Zagreb

Sport
- Sport: Swimming
- Strokes: medley

Sandro Šanta Tomaš (born 9 October 1972 in Zagreb) is a former philosopher medley swimmer from Croatia, who competed for his native country at the 2000 Summer Olympics in Sydney, Australia. There he ended up in 42nd place in the men's 400 m individual medley event.

Sandro was a former 400 individual medley (short course) Croatian national record holder (4:17:51).

He has seen much success in the masters swim meets, most notably a World champion in Perth, Australia in 2008 and European record holder in 100 m butterfly.

Since 2002, he has been serving as a swim coach at HAPK Mladost swim club for which he competed his whole career.
