= Oleg Pukhnatiy =

Uzbekistani swimmer (born 1975)

Personal information
- Full name: Oleg Pukhnatiy
- National team: Uzbekistan
- Born: 10 June 1975 (age 51) Tashkent, Uzbek SSR, Soviet Union
- Height: 1.80 m (5 ft 11 in)
- Weight: 76 kg (168 lb)

Sport
- Sport: Swimming
- Strokes: Freestyle, medley
- Club: Oltin Suv
- Coach: Daniya Galandinova

Oleg Pukhnatiy (Uzbek: Олег Пухнатй; born June 10, 1975) is an Uzbek former swimmer, who specialized in freestyle and individual medley events. He is a three-time Olympian (1996, 2000, and 2004), and a top 16 finalist at the 2002 Asian Games in Busan, South Korea.

Pukhnatiy made his first Uzbek team at the 1996 Summer Olympics in Atlanta. There, he failed to reach the top 16 final in the 200 m individual medley, finishing in twenty-fourth place with a time of 2:06.39. He also placed seventeenth, as a member of the Uzbekistan team, in the 4 × 100 m freestyle relay (3:28.33).

On his second Olympic appearance in Sydney 2000, Pukhnatiy placed thirty-second in the 200 m individual medley. Swimming in heat three, he picked up a second seed by a 1.33-second margin behind winner George Bovell of Trinidad and Tobago in 2:06.01. He also held liable for an early takeoff in the 4 × 100 m freestyle relay, when his Uzbekistan team had been disqualified from the heats.

Pukhnatiy shortened his program at the 2004 Summer Olympics in Athens, when he swam only for the third time in the 200 m individual medley. He cleared a FINA B-standard entry time of 2:07.49 from the Kazakhstan Open Championships in Almaty. Swimming in heat two, he edged out Chinese Taipei's Wu Nien-pin to take a fifth spot by nearly half a second (0.50) in 2:08.24. Pukhnatiy failed to advance into the semifinals, as he placed forty-second overall in the preliminaries.
