= Jordi Carrasco =

Spanish swimmer

Personal information
- National team: Spain
- Born: March 2, 1975 (age 51)

Sport
- Sport: Swimming

Jordi Carrasco (born 2 March 1975) is a Spanish former medley swimmer who competed in the 2000 Summer Olympics.
