= Marcin Maliński =

Polish swimmer

Personal information
- Born: 10 January 1973 (age 53) Jarocin, Poland
- Height: 1.83 m (6 ft 0 in)
- Weight: 74 kg (163 lb)

Sport
- Sport: Swimming
- Club: WKS Flota Gdynia (POL) / Mission Viejo Nadadores (US)
Medal record
Men's swimming
Representing Poland
World Championships (SC)
Bronze medal – third place	1995 Rio de Janeiro	200 m medley
Bronze medal – third place	1995 Rio de Janeiro	400 m medley
European Championships (LC)
Silver medal – second place	1995 Vienna	400 m medley

Marcin Maliński (born 10 January 1973) is a retired Polish swimmer who won three medals in the 200 m and 400 m individual medley events at European World championships in 1995. He also competed in these disciplines at the 1992 and 1996 Summer Olympics with the best achievement of seventh place in 1996.

He was born as a son of a military officer Zbigniew Maliński and started swimming aged 5. Between 1989 and 1991 he was training at the Mission Viejo Nadadores club in the United States. In 1997 he returned to the US to study at Indian River State College in Fort Pierce, Florida, and then at Drury University in Springfield, Missouri. He then moved to Iceland, where he works as a swimming coach and competes in the masters category. His younger brothers, Jakub and Michał, were also competitive swimmers.
