= Josef Horký =

Czech swimmer (born 1972)

Personal information
- Full name: Josef Horký
- National team: Czech Republic
- Born: 3 February 1972 (age 54) Brno, Czechoslovakia
- Height: 1.87 m (6 ft 2 in)
- Weight: 80 kg (176 lb)

Sport
- Sport: Swimming
- Strokes: Freestyle, butterfly, medley
- Club: Kometa Brno
- Coach: Ondřej Butir

Josef Horký (born February 3, 1972) is a Czech former swimmer, who specialized in freestyle, butterfly, and individual medley events. He is a two-time Olympian (1996 and 2004), a semifinalist in the 200 m butterfly at the European Championships (2002), and a member of Kometa Brno under his head coach Ondřej Butir.

Horky made his first Czech team at the 1996 Summer Olympics in Atlanta. On the first day of the Games, he managed to pull off a top 16 effort in the 400 m individual medley, edging out Australia's Trent Steed to earn a fourteenth spot by almost a full second in 4:28.39. Out of his remaining tries, Horky was unable to target the same goal as his first event, finishing thirtieth in the 200 m butterfly (2:02.84), and eighteenth in the 200 m individual medley (2:05.45).

After an eight-year absence, Horky competed only in the men's 4 × 200 m freestyle relay, and served as a senior captain for the Czech swimming team at the 2004 Summer Olympics in Athens. Teaming with Michal Rubáček, Květoslav Svoboda, and Martin Škacha in heat two, Horky swam a third leg and recorded a split of 1:53.29, but the Czechs settled only for seventh place and thirteenth overall in a final time of 7:26.26.
