= Xavier Marchand =

French swimmer

Personal information
- Nationality: France
- Born: 4 August 1973 (age 53) Deauville, Lower Normandy, France
- Height: 185 cm (6 ft 1 in)
- Weight: 85 kg (187 lb)

Sport
- Sport: Swimming
- Strokes: Medley
Medal record
Men's swimming
Representing France
World Championships (LC)
| Silver medal – second place | 1998 Perth | 200 m medley |
European Championships (LC)
| Silver medal – second place | 1997 Seville | 200 m medley |
| Bronze medal – third place | 2000 Helsinki | 200 m medley |
Mediterranean Games
| Gold medal – first place | 1997 Bari | 200 m medley |

Xavier Marchand (born 4 August 1973 in Deauville) is a former French medley swimmer, who competed in the 1996 and 2000 Summer Olympics. He won the silver medal in the men's 200 metres individual medley event at the 1998 World Aquatics Championships in Perth, Australia.

== Career ==
After competing in the United States at the college level for Auburn University, Marchand competed in his first Olympics in 1996 in Atlanta, Georgia. He won his first international medal (silver) in 1997, at the 1997 European Aquatics Championships in the 200 m individual medley, coming in second behind the Netherlands' Marcel Wouda.

== Personal life ==
Marchand is married to former French Olympic swimmer Céline Bonnet. Their eldest son, Léon Marchand, is a four-time Olympic champion as well as a World and Olympic record holder in the long course. His older brother Christophe Marchand is also a former swimmer.
