= Frederik Hviid =

Spanish swimmer (born 1974)

Medal record

Representing Spain

Men's swimming

World Championships (SC)
Bronze medal – third place	1999 Hong Kong	400 m indiv. medley

European LC Championships
Gold medal – first place	1999 Istanbul	400 m indiv. medley
Silver medal – second place	1997 Seville	400 m indiv. medley

European Championships (SC)
Gold medal – first place	1999 Lisbon	400 m medley
Silver medal – second place	1998 Sheffield	400 m medley
Silver medal – second place	2000 Valencia	1500 m freestyle
Silver medal – second place	2000 Valencia	400 m medley

Frederik Carlo Hviid Köhler (born 9 November 1974 in Las Palmas, Gran Canaria) is a former long-distance freestyle and medley swimmer from Spain who competed at two consecutive Summer Olympics for his native country, starting in 1996. In the late 1990s he won several medals in the international short course and long course events. He's a recipient of the Spanish Cross of the Order of Merit (Silver and Bronze designation), handed to him by then crown prince Felipe de Borbón (Felipe VI).

During his swimming career he made finals in the 1996 Summer Olympics in Atlanta, winning the "B" Final in the 400m IM. At the 2000 Olympics in Sydney, with aspirations and goals to medal in the 400m IM, he fell victim to influenza and was not able to qualify for the finals in his prime event, the 400m individual medley (IM).

He swam in three Swimming World Championships. Rome, Italy in 1994, Perth, Australia in 1998 and Hong Kong, China in 1999, with his best performance coming at the 1999 SC World Championships in Hong Kong, China. He won a bronze medal and broke the Spanish national record in the 400m IM at the event.

He participated in seven European Aquatics Championships: at Sheffield, England, in 1993; Vienna in 1995; Seville, Spain in 1997; Sheffield again in 1998; Istanbul in 1999; Lisbon in 1999; and Valencia, Spain, in 2000. He won the gold medal both in the 400m IM long course at the 1999 European Aquatics Championships in Istanbul, Turkey and in the 1999 short course edition in Lisbon. He was awarded silver medals in the 400m IM at the 1997 Seville long course edition, the Sheffield 1998 short course edition, and the Valencia 2000 short course edition, and he also won silver in Valencia in the 1,500m freestyle.

At the World Cup series he won gold in the 1,500m free at College Park, Maryland, in 1999, along with a gold in the 400m IM. In the 2000 World Cup at College Park again, he won gold in the 1,500m freestyle and 400m freestyle, and a silver in the 400m IM.

At the 1992 US Open in Orlando, Florida, he took gold in the 200m and 400m IM. He returned to the US Open in 1997 in Indianapolis, Indiana, to win gold in the 400m freestyle and take silver in both the 1,500m freestyle and 400m IM.

He also competed for American University during his college career. He was a two-time All-American in the 400-yard individual medley and the 1,650 freestyle in 1994, and finished his career at the university with six Reeves Center Pool records; he remains the current record-holder in 1,000 freestyle, 1,650 freestyle and 400 IM. Named the Colonial Athletic Association Swimmer of the Year in 1993 and 1994, he was also named Outstanding Meet Performer at the 1992 CAA championships. He won eight individual titles at the CAA's through his college career. In February 2017 he was inducted into the Stafford H. "Pop" Cassell Hall of Fame.

From 1997 through 2004 (400-800 freestyle lc, 400 freestyle sc), 2007 (1500 freestyle lc), 2008 (800 freestyle sc, 400IM lc, 400IM sc) and 2009 (1500 freestyle sc) he has some of the Spanish record in long course and short course for the 400m IM, 400m Freestyle, 800m Freestyle and 1,500m Freestyle (8 total Spanish National Records) but in different periods.

After a 10-year hiatus and absence from swimming, Fred picked up swimming again as a masters competitor. He participated in the 2014 Masters World Championships in Montreal, Canada and won gold in both the 800m freestyle and the 200m backstroke. During this last event he broke the masters world record for the 40-44 age group. 12 days later he broke his own record again while competing at the US Masters Nationals in College Park, MD.

He has also taken a liking to open water swimming and has won the Great Chesapeake Bay swim, a 4.4 mile swim (7.1 kilometers) that crosses the Bay at the Chesapeake Bay bridge.

Fred is currently an assistant swim coach for the Monocacy Aquatic Club (MAC) in Frederick, MD. He's been coaching there since 2013.
