= Adrian Andermatt =

Swiss swimmer (born 1969)

Personal information
- Nationality: Switzerland
- Born: 7 March 1969 (age 57)

Sport
- Sport: Swimming
- Strokes: freestyle and butterfly
- Club: SC Uster-Wallisellen
Medal record
European Championships (SC)
Bronze medal – third place	1996 Rostock	200 m butterfly

Adrian Andermatt (born 7 March 1969) is a retired butterfly and freestyle swimmer from Switzerland. He is best known for winning the bronze medal in the men's 200 m butterfly at the 1996 European SC Championships in Rostock, alongside France's David Abrard.
