= Matthew Dunn (swimmer) =

Australian swimmer

Personal information
- Full name: Matthew Stephen Dunn
- National team: Australia
- Born: 2 September 1973 (age 53) Leeton, New South Wales
- Height: 1.84 m (6 ft 0 in)
- Weight: 84 kg (185 lb)

Sport
- Sport: Swimming
- Strokes: Freestyle, medley
Medal record
Men's swimming
Representing Australia
World Championships (SC)
Gold medal – first place	1995 Rio de Janeiro	200 m medley
Gold medal – first place	1995 Rio de Janeiro	400 m medley
Gold medal – first place	1995 Rio de Janeiro	4x200 m free
Gold medal – first place	1997 Gothenburg	200 m medley
Gold medal – first place	1997 Gothenburg	400 m medley
Gold medal – first place	1997 Gothenburg	4x200 m free
Gold medal – first place	1999 Hong Kong	200 m medley
Gold medal – first place	1999 Hong Kong	400 m medley
Silver medal – second place	1995 Rio de Janeiro	4x100 m free
Silver medal – second place	1999 Hong Kong	100 m medley
Pan Pacific Championships
Gold medal – first place	1993 Kobe	200 m medley
Gold medal – first place	1993 Kobe	400 m medley
Gold medal – first place	1995 Atlanta	4x200 m free
Gold medal – first place	1997 Fukuoka	200 m medley
Gold medal – first place	1997 Fukuoka	400 m medley
Gold medal – first place	1999 Sydney	400 m medley
Silver medal – second place	1993 Kobe	4x100 m free
Silver medal – second place	1993 Kobe	4x200 m free
Silver medal – second place	1995 Atlanta	200 m medley
Bronze medal – third place	1991 Edmonton	400 m medley
Bronze medal – third place	1995 Atlanta	400 m medley
Bronze medal – third place	1999 Sydney	200 m medley
Commonwealth Games
Gold medal – first place	1994 Victoria	200 m medley
Gold medal – first place	1994 Victoria	400 m medley
Gold medal – first place	1994 Victoria	4 x 200 m free
Gold medal – first place	1998 Kuala Lumpur	200 m medley
Gold medal – first place	1998 Kuala Lumpur	4 x 200 m free

Matthew Stephen Dunn (born 2 September 1973) is an Australian former freestyle and medley swimmer who competed in three consecutive Summer Olympics, starting in 1992.

Dunn trained at the Australian Institute of Sport under Russian swimming coach Gennadi Touretski, who also taught Alexander Popov. Dunn was a specialist in the short course (25 m) events, and won several medals in the event in the 1990s. He was a multiple Commonwealth Games gold medallist in the medley events and set a world record in the 4 × 200 m freestyle relay at the 1998 Commonwealth Games in Kuala Lumpur alongside Ian Thorpe, Michael Klim and Daniel Kowalski.

== See also ==
- List of Commonwealth Games medallists in swimming (men)
- List of Commonwealth Games records in swimming
- World record progression 400 metres individual medley
- World record progression 4 × 200 metres freestyle relay

Records
Preceded by Marcel Wouda	Men's 400 metre individual medley world record holder (short course); 24 September 1998 – 23 February 2003	Succeeded by Brian Johns
