= István Batházi =

Hungarian swimmer

Personal information
- Full name: Batházi István
- Nationality: Hungary
- Born: 16 December 1978 (age 47) Budapest
- Height: 1.96 m (6 ft 5 in)
- Weight: 93 kg (205 lb)

Sport
- Sport: Swimming
- Strokes: Medley
- Club: Köbànya Sport Club
Medal record
European Championships (LC)
Gold medal – first place	2000 Helsinki	400 m individual medley
Silver medal – second place	2002 Berlin	400 m individual medley

István Batházi (born 16 December 1978 in Budapest) is a male medley swimmer from Hungary, who competed three times for his native country at the Summer Olympics in 1996 and 2000. He won the European title in the men's 400 m individual medley in 2000 (Helsinki). In 2009 Istvan set the 200m(LC) Individual Medley Masters World Record for 30-34 age group.

== Awards ==
- Hungarian swimmer of the Year (1): 2002
