= Michael Halika =

Israeli swimmer (born 1978)

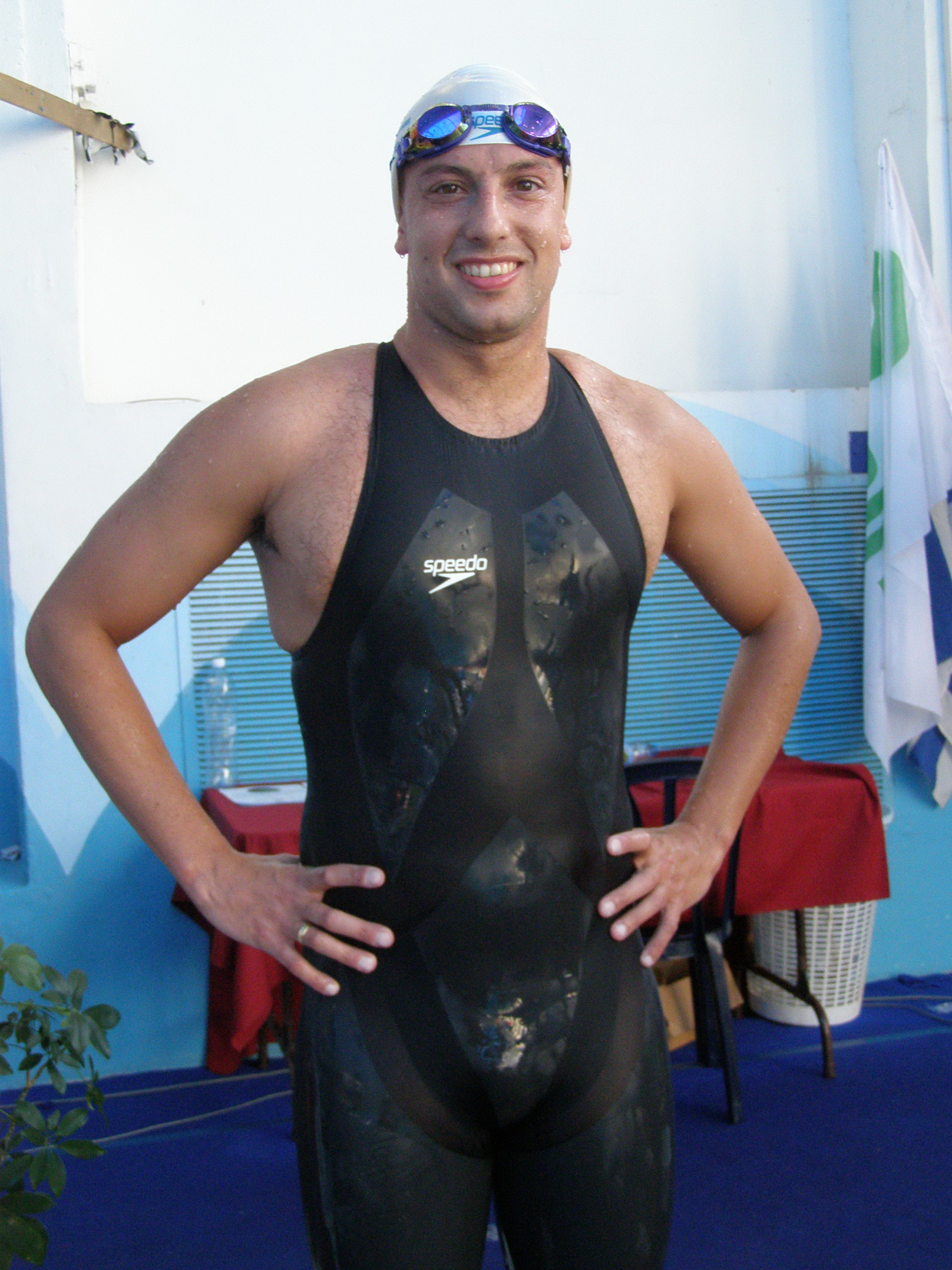

Medal record

Men's swimming

Representing Israel

World Championships (SC)
Bronze medal – third place	2000 Athens	400 m medley

European Championships (LC)
Silver medal – second place	1999 Istanbul	400 m medley

European Championships (SC)
Bronze medal – third place	1999 Lisbon	400 m medley
Bronze medal – third place	2000 Valencia	400 m medley

Summer Universiade
Silver medal – second place	1997 Catania	400 m medley
Silver medal – second place	1999 Mallorca	400 m medley
Bronze medal – third place	2003 Daegu	400 m medley

Maccabiah Games
Gold medal – first place	1997 Israel	800 m freestyle
Gold medal – first place	1997 Israel	400 m medley
Gold medal – first place	2005 Israel	400 m medley

Michael "Mickey" Halika (Hebrew: מיכאל "מיקי" חליקה; born October 11, 1978, in Jerusalem) is a former Israeli swimmer.

== Swimming career ==
Despite being of Israeli nationality he won the 400 metres medley titles in 1996 and 1999 at the ASA National British Championships.

At the 1997 Maccabiah Games, he won gold medals in 800 m freestyle and 400 m medley in the juniors.

He competed in three events at the 2000 Summer Olympics in Sydney, Australia as a member of the Israeli swimming team.

In 2000 in Athens he won a bronze medal in the 400 IM at the FINA Short Course World Championships. In 2003 he won bronze in the 400 IM at the Summer Universiade in South Korea.

At the 2005 Maccabiah Games, he won a gold medal in the 400 m medley, setting a Maccabiah record.

At the 2009 Maccabiah Games, he won a gold medal in the 200 m individual medley.
