= Christian Keller (swimmer) =

German swimmer (born 1972)

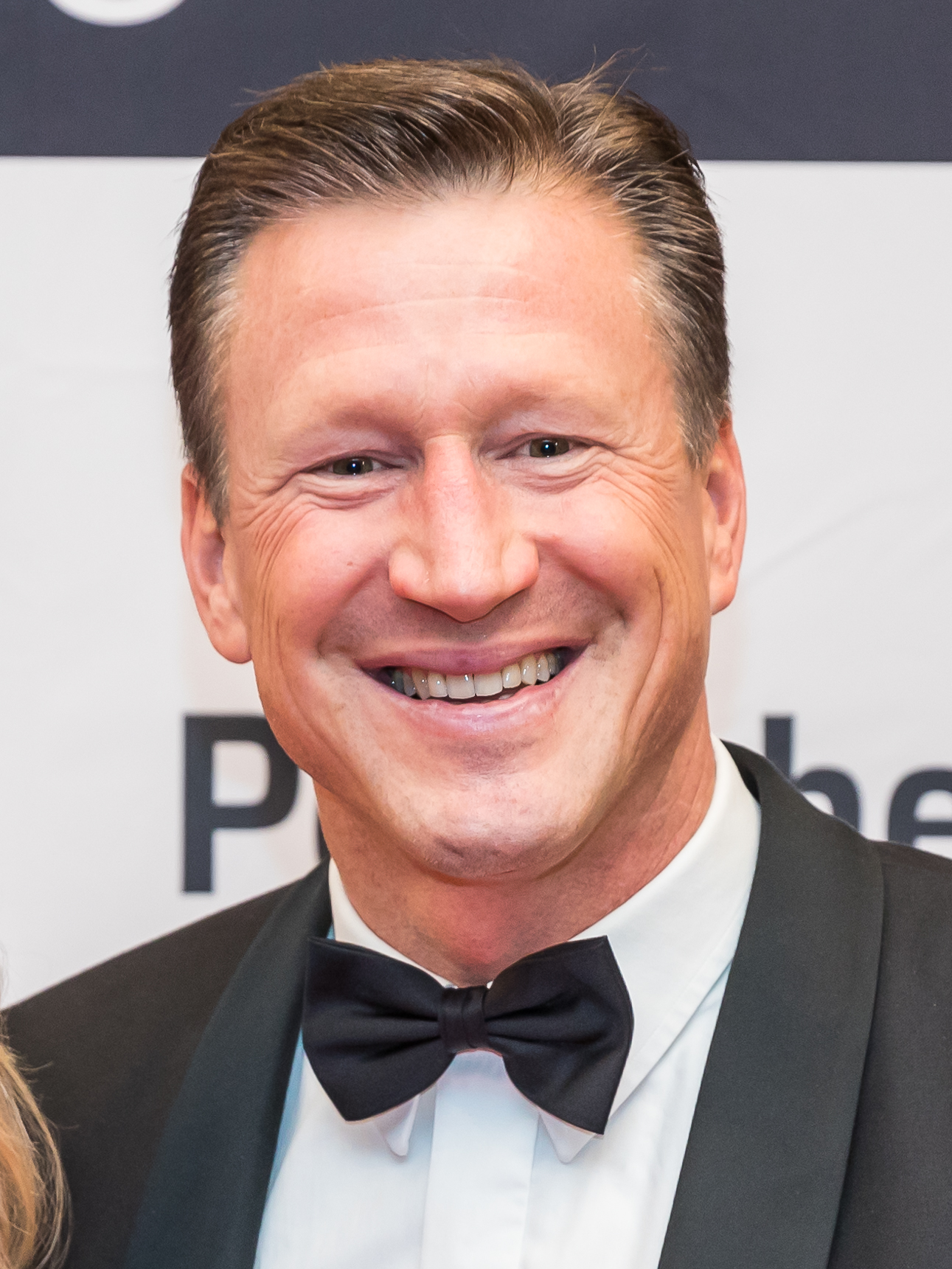

Personal information
- Full name: Christian Keller
- Nationality: Germany
- Born: August 3, 1972 (age 54) Essen, North Rhine-Westphalia, West Germany
- Height: 1.88 m (6 ft 2 in)

Sport
- Sport: Swimming
- Strokes: Freestyle, individual medley
- Club: Sportgemeinschaft Duisburg
Medal record
Men's swimming
Representing Germany
Olympic Games
Bronze medal – third place	1996 Atlanta	4×200 m freestyle
World Championships (LC)
Bronze medal – third place	1994 Rome	4×200 m freestyle
Bronze medal – third place	2003 Barcelona	4×200 m freestyle
World Championships (SC)
Gold medal – first place	1993 Palma	200 m medley
Silver medal – second place	1993 Palma	200 m butterfly
Silver medal – second place	1993 Palma	4×200 m freestyle
Silver medal – second place	1997 Gothenburg	200 m medley
Bronze medal – third place	1997 Gothenburg	400 m medley
European Championships (LC)
Gold medal – first place	1995 Vienna	4×200 m freestyle
Gold medal – first place	1999 Istanbul	4×200 m freestyle
Silver medal – second place	1993 Sheffield	4×200 m freestyle
Silver medal – second place	1995 Vienna	4×100 m freestyle
Silver medal – second place	1999 Istanbul	4×100 m medley
Silver medal – second place	2000 Helsinki	200 m medley
Silver medal – second place	2000 Helsinki	4×200 m freestyle
Bronze medal – third place	1991 Athens	4×200 m freestyle
Bronze medal – third place	1993 Sheffield	200 m medley
Bronze medal – third place	1995 Vienna	200 m medley
Bronze medal – third place	1997 Seville	4×200 m freestyle
Bronze medal – third place	1999 Istanbul	4×100 m freestyle
European Championships (SC)
Silver medal – second place	1994 Stavanger	100 m medley
Silver medal – second place	1996 Rostock	200 m medley
Silver medal – second place	1996 Rostock	400 m medley
Silver medal – second place	2000 Valencia	200 m medley
Bronze medal – third place	1993 Gateshead	100 m medley
Bronze medal – third place	1996 Rostock	100 m medley
Bronze medal – third place	1998 Sheffield	400 m medley

Christian Keller (born August 3, 1972, in Essen, North Rhine-Westphalia). is a former medley and freestyle swimmer from Germany, who competed in four consecutive Summer Olympics for his native country, starting in 1992. Four years later the three-time European Junior Champion won the bronze medal with the men's 4×200 m freestyle relay. Keller was named German Swimmer of the Year for two consecutive years: 1994 and 1995.
