= Marko Milenkovič =

Slovenian swimmer

Personal information
- Full name: Marko Milenkovič
- Nationality: Slovenia
- Born: 8 March 1976 (age 50) Kranj
- Height: 1.74 m (5 ft 9 in)
- Weight: 78 kg (172 lb)

Sport
- Sport: Swimming
- Strokes: Medley and backstroke
- Club: Plavalni Klub Radovljica; Plavalni Klub Triglav Kranj

Marko Milenkovič (born 8 March 1976 in Kranj) is a retired male medley and backstroke swimmer from Slovenia, who twice competed for his native country at the Summer Olympics: in 2000 and 2004.
