= Krešimir Čač =

Croatian swimmer (born 1976)

Personal information
- Born: 12 January 1976 (age 50) Zagreb
Medal record
Men's swimming
Representing Croatia
European Championships (SC)
Bronze medal – third place	1996 Rostock	200 m medley
Mediterranean Games
Silver medal – second place	1997 Bari	400 m medley
Bronze medal – third place	1997 Bari	200 m medley

Krešimir Čač (pronounced [krěʂimir t͡ʂâːt͡ʂ]; born 12 January 1976 in Zagreb) is a butterfly and medley swimmer from Croatia, who competed in three consecutive Summer Olympics for his native country, starting in 1996. He retired from swimming in 2008.

Čač is a former national record holder for the 200 and 400 m medley.
