= Swimming at the 1992 Summer Olympics – Men's 4 × 200 metre freestyle relay =

Men's 4 × 200 metre freestyle relay at the Games of the XXV Olympiad
- Venue: Piscines Bernat Picornell
- Date: 27 July 1992 (heats & final)
- Competitors: 80 from 18 nations
- Teams: 18
- Winning time: 7:11.95 WR

Medalists
1st place, gold medalist(s)		Dmitry Lepikov, Vladimir Pyshnenko, Veniamin Tayanovich, Yevgeny Sadovyi, Aleksey Kudryavtsev*, Yury Mukhin*	Unified Team
2nd place, silver medalist(s)		Sweden; Christer Wallin, Anders Holmertz, Tommy Werner, Lars Frölander	Sweden
3rd place, bronze medalist(s)		Joe Hudepohl, Melvin Stewart, Jon Olsen, Doug Gjertsen, Scott Jaffe*, Dan Jorgensen*; *Indicates the swimmer only competed in the preliminary heats.	United States

The men's 4 × 200 metre freestyle relay at the 1992 Summer Olympics was held on 27 July 1992 at the Piscines Bernat Picornell in Barcelona, Spain.

== Records ==
Prior to this competition, the existing world and Olympic records were as follows.

World record	United States (USA); Troy Dalbey (1:49.37); Matt Cetlinski (1:48.44); Doug Gjertsen (1:48.26); Matt Biondi (1:46.44)	7:12.51	Seoul, South Korea	21 September 1988
Olympic record	United States; Troy Dalbey (1:49.37); Matt Cetlinski (1:48.44); Doug Gjertsen (1:48.26); Matt Biondi (1:46.44)	7:12.51	Seoul, South Korea	21 September 1988

The following new world and Olympic records were set during this competition.

Date	Event	Name	Nationality	Time	Record
27 July	Final	Dmitry Lepikov (1:49.55); Vladimir Pyshnenko (1:46.58); Veniamin Tayanovich (1:48.99); Yevgeny Sadovyi (1:46.83)	Unified Team	7:11.95	WR

== Results ==
=== Heats ===
Rule: The eight fastest teams advance to the final (Q).

Rank	Heat	Lane	Nation	Swimmers	Time	Notes
1	2	4	Unified Team	Dmitry Lepikov (1:49.80); Aleksey Kudryavtsev (1:49.65); Yury Mukhin (1:49.28); Veniamin Tayanovich (1:48.92)	7:17.65	Q
2	2	5	Germany	Peter Sitt (1:50.02); Christian Tröger (1:49.81); Andreas Szigat (1:49.40); Stefan Pfeiffer (1:48.98)	7:18.21	Q
3	3	3	Sweden	Christer Wallin (1:50.52); Lars Frölander (1:50.13); Tommy Werner (1:49.23); Anders Holmertz (1:50.15)	7:20.03	Q
4	1	4	Australia	Duncan Armstrong (1:51.53); Martin Roberts (1:51.45); Deane Pieters (1:50.03); Ian Brown (1:49.18)	7:22.19	Q
5	1	5	Great Britain	Paul Palmer (1:50.12); Steven Mellor (1:52.03); Stephen Akers (1:51.66); Paul Howe (1:49.29)	7:23.10	Q
6	3	4	United States	Scott Jaffe (1:50.14); Dan Jorgensen (1:50.56); Jon Olsen (1:50.03); Doug Gjertsen (1:52.97)	7:23.70	Q
7	1	6	Brazil	Gustavo Borges (1:50.79); Emanuel Nascimento (1:51.69); Teófilo Ferreira (1:51.33); Cristiano Michelena (1:50.39)	7:24.20	Q, SA
8	3	5	Italy	Roberto Gleria (1:51.21); Emanuele Idini (1:51.53); Pier Maria Siciliano (1:52.25); Stefano Battistelli (1:50.54)	7:25.53	Q
9	3	6	Canada	Edward Parenti (1:51.56); Darren Ward (1:51.14); Christopher Bowie (1:52.70); Turlough O'Hare (1:50.21)	7:25.61	
10	2	3	France	Christophe Bordeau (1:51.22); Lionel Poirot (1:53.18); Franck Horter (1:50.84); Yann de Fabrique (1:50.98)	7:26.22	
11	2	2	New Zealand	Trent Bray (1:51.38); Richard Tapper (1:54.35); John Steel (1:50.94); Danyon Loader (1:49.69)	7:26.36	
12	1	2	Finland	Jani Sievinen (1:52.10); Vesa Hanski (1:53.54); Petteri Lehtinen (1:54.10); Antti Kasvio (1:48.97)	7:28.71	
13	1	3	Poland	Mariusz Podkościelny (1:51.71); Artur Wojdat (1:49.88); Piotr Albiński (1:52.83); Krzysztof Cwalina (1:55.17)	7:29.59	
14	2	6	Norway	Jarl Inge Melberg (1:50.78); Thomas Sopp (1:51.01); Trond Høines (1:54.00); Kjell Lundemoen (1:55.56)	7:31.35	
15	3	2	Puerto Rico	Jorge Herrera (1:54.30); Manuel Guzmán (1:52.37); Ricardo Busquets (1:54.19); David Monasterio (1:54.77)	7:35.63	
16	2	7	Hong Kong	Arthur Li Kai Yien (1:55.91); Michael Wright (1:58.77); Kelvin Li Kar Wai (2:00.78); Wu Tat Cheung (1:58.84)	7:54.30	
17	1	7	Guatemala	Andrés Sedano (2:02.73); Helder Torres (2:02.32); Roberto Bonilla (2:03.66); Gustavo Bucaro (1:58.59)	8:07.30	
18	3	1	United Arab Emirates	Mohamed Bin Abid (2:07.49); Obaid Al-Rumaithi (2:15.98); Abdullah Sultan (2:09.56); Ahmad Faraj (2:06.69)	8:39.72	

=== Final ===
Rank	Lane	Nation	Swimmers	Time	Notes
1st place, gold medalist(s)	4	Unified Team	Dmitry Lepikov (1:49.55); Vladimir Pyshnenko (1:46.58); Veniamin Tayanovich (1:48.99); Yevgeny Sadovyi (1:46.83)	7:11.95	WR
2nd place, silver medalist(s)	3	Sweden	Christer Wallin (1:49.69); Anders Holmertz (1:46.16); Tommy Werner (1:49.35); Lars Frölander (1:50.31)	7:15.51	NR
3rd place, bronze medalist(s)	7	United States	Joe Hudepohl (1:49.52); Melvin Stewart (1:48.41); Jon Olsen (1:49.19); Doug Gjertsen (1:49.11)	7:16.23	
4	5	Germany	Peter Sitt (1:50.06); Steffen Zesner (1:47.78); Andreas Szigat (1:49.61); Stefan Pfeiffer (1:49.13)	7:16.58	
5	8	Italy	Roberto Gleria (1:49.29); Giorgio Lamberti (1:49.80); Massimo Trevisan (1:47.97); Stefano Battistelli (1:51.04)	7:18.10	
6	2	Great Britain	Paul Palmer (1:49.21); Steven Mellor (1:51.77); Stephen Akers (1:51.61); Paul Howe (1:49.98)	7:22.57	NR
7	1	Brazil	Gustavo Borges (1:50.45); Emanuel Nascimento (1:52.63); Teófilo Ferreira (1:50.28); Cristiano Michelena (1:50.67)	7:24.03	SA
	6	Australia	Ian Brown (1:49.45); Deane Pieters; Kieren Perkins; Duncan Armstrong	DSQ	
