= Swimming at the 1992 Summer Olympics – Men's 200 metre freestyle =

Men's 200 metre freestyle at the Games of the XXV Olympiad
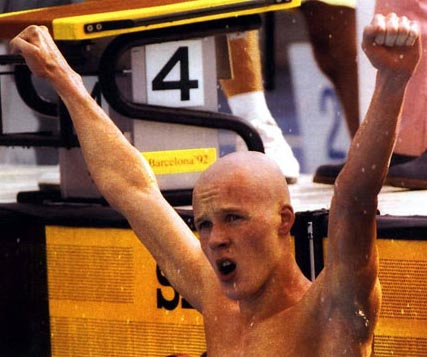
- Gold medalist Yevgeny Sadovyi
- Venue: Piscines Bernat Picornell
- Date: 26 July 1992 (heats & finals)
- Competitors: 55 from 39 nations
- Winning time: 1:46.70 OR

Medalists
1st place, gold medalist(s)		Yevgeny Sadovyi	Unified Team
2nd place, silver medalist(s)		Anders Holmertz	Sweden
3rd place, bronze medalist(s)		Antti Kasvio	Finland

The men's 200 metre freestyle event at the 1992 Summer Olympics took place on 26 July at the Piscines Bernat Picornell in Barcelona, Spain. There were 55 competitors from 39 nations, with each nation having up to two swimmers (a limit in place since 1984). The event was won by Yevgeny Sadovyi of the Unified Team; it was the first victory in the men's 200 metre freestyle by an athlete from the former Soviet Union since Moscow 1980. Anders Holmertz of Sweden repeated as the silver medalist, becoming the first man to win multiple medals in the event. Antti Kasvio earned a bronze medal in Finland's debut in the event.

== Background ==
This was the ninth appearance of the 200 metre freestyle event. It was first contested in 1900. It would be contested a second time, though at 220 yards, in 1904. After that, the event did not return until 1968; since then, it has been on the programme at every Summer Games.

Three of the 8 finalists from the 1988 Games returned: silver medalist Anders Holmertz of Sweden, fourth-place finisher Artur Wojdat of Poland, and sixth-place finisher Steffen Zesner of East Germany (now competing for unified Germany). Reigning World Champion and world record holder Giorgio Lamberti of Italy competed in the 4 × 200 metre freestyle relay but not this event after a bout of flu at the Italian trials kept him from qualifying. Reigning Olympic champion and Olympic record holder Duncan Armstrong of Australia also competed only in the relay. The other two medalists from the 1991 World Aquatics Championships were Zesner (silver) and Wojdat (bronze).

Bolivia, Finland, Mauritius, Saudi Arabia, Seychelles, Slovenia, and Sri Lanka each made their debut in the event; some former Soviet republics competed as the Unified Team. Australia made its ninth appearance, the only nation to have competed in all prior editions of the event.

== Competition format ==
The competition used a two-round (heats, final) format. The advancement rule followed the format introduced in 1952. A swimmer's place in the heat was not used to determine advancement; instead, the fastest times from across all heats in a round were used. There were 8 heats of up to 8 swimmers each. The top 8 swimmers advanced to the final. The 1984 event had also introduced a consolation or "B" final; the swimmers placing 9th through 16th in the heats competed in this "B" final for placing. Swim-offs were used as necessary to break ties.

This swimming event used freestyle swimming, which means that the method of the stroke is not regulated (unlike backstroke, breaststroke, and butterfly events). Nearly all swimmers use the front crawl or a variant of that stroke. Because an Olympic-size swimming pool is 50 metres long, this race consisted of four lengths of the pool.

== Records ==
Prior to this competition, the existing world and Olympic records were as follows.

World record	Giorgio Lamberti (ITA)	1:46.69	Bonn, West Germany	15 August 1989
Olympic record	Duncan Armstrong (AUS)	1:47.25	Seoul, South Korea	19 September 1988

The following records were established during the competition:

Date	Round	Swimmer	Nation	Time	Record
26 July	Heat 8	Yevgeny Sadovyi	Unified Team	1:46.74	OR
26 July	Final A	Yevgeny Sadovyi	Unified Team	1:46.70	OR

== Schedule ==
All times are Central European Summer Time (UTC+2)

Date	Time	Round
Sunday, 26 July 1992	11:30; 18:45	Heats; Finals

== Results ==
=== Heats ===
Rule: The eight fastest swimmers advance to final A (Q), while the next eight to final B (q).

Rank	Heat	Lane	Swimmer	Nation	Time	Notes
1	6	5	Yevgeny Sadovyi	Unified Team	1:46.74	QA, OR
2	6	4	Anders Holmertz	Sweden	1:46.76	QA, NR
3	7	6	Vladimir Pyshnenko	Unified Team	1:47.94	QA
4	6	3	Steffen Zesner	Germany	1:48.12	QA
5	8	6	Antti Kasvio	Finland	1:48.31	QA
6	8	5	Joe Hudepohl	United States	1:48.52	QA
7	8	4	Artur Wojdat	Poland	1:48.60	QA
8	8	3	Doug Gjertsen	United States	1:48.65	QA
9	7	5	Roberto Gleria	Italy	1:49.19	QB, WD
10	8	1	Paul Palmer	Great Britain	1:49.21	QB
11	7	3	Kieren Perkins	Australia	1:49.26	QB
12	8	2	Ian Brown	Australia	1:49.32	QB
13	7	4	Massimo Trevisan	Italy	1:49.80	QB
14	7	1	Paul Howe	Great Britain	1:49.86	QB
15	6	8	Tommy Werner	Sweden	1:50.01	QB, WD
16	7	2	Christian Keller	Germany	1:50.07	QB
17	8	8	Turlough O'Hare	Canada	1:50.42	QB
18	4	6	John Steel	New Zealand	1:50.56	QB
19	8	7	Jarl Inge Melberg	Norway	1:50.70	
20	6	6	Uğur Taner	Turkey	1:50.95	
21	6	1	Cristiano Michelena	Brazil	1:51.04	
22	6	2	Gustavo Borges	Brazil	1:51.42	
23	7	7	Darren Ward	Canada	1:51.62	
24	7	8	Stefaan Maene	Belgium	1:51.85	
25	5	2	Robert Pinter	Romania	1:52.24	
26	5	4	Trent Bray	New Zealand	1:52.49	
27	6	7	Béla Szabados	Hungary	1:52.50	
28	4	3	Vesa Hanski	Finland	1:53.17	
29	5	3	Jure Bučar	Slovenia	1:53.19	
30	5	6	Shigeo Ogata	Japan	1:53.42	
31	5	1	Toshiaki Kurasawa	Japan	1:53.75	
32	4	4	Franz Mortensen	Denmark	1:53.86	
33	3	4	Arthur Li Kai Yien	Hong Kong	1:54.35	
34	4	7	Yves Clausse	Luxembourg	1:54.45	
35	4	1	Nace Majcen	Slovenia	1:54.57	
36	3	3	Jeffrey Ong	Malaysia	1:55.37	
37	5	5	Xie Jun	China	1:55.51	
38	4	2	Ivor Le Roux	Zimbabwe	1:56.17	
39	3	5	Kenneth Yeo	Singapore	1:57.80	
40	3	7	Gustavo Bucaro	Guatemala	1:58.13	
41	3	1	Kelvin Li	Hong Kong	1:59.40	
42	3	6	Benoît Fleurot	Mauritius	1:59.73	
43	2	6	Plutarco Castellanos	Honduras	1:59.91	
44	2	3	Helder Torres	Guatemala	2:00.04	
45	2	5	Frank Flores	Guam	2:00.48	
46	3	2	Luis Medina	Bolivia	2:00.87	
47	1	3	Émile Lahoud	Lebanon	2:01.06	
48	1	4	Hussein Al-Sadiq	Saudi Arabia	2:01.31	
49	2	2	Julian Bolling	Sri Lanka	2:02.01	
50	1	6	Carl Probert	Fiji	2:04.52	
51	2	7	Laurent Alfred	Virgin Islands	2:04.59	
52	1	5	Daniele Casadei	San Marino	2:06.14	
53	1	2	Ahmad Faraj	United Arab Emirates	2:07.61	
54	1	7	Jean-Paul Adam	Seychelles	2:09.99	
—	5	7	Zoltán Szilágyi	Hungary	DSQ	
—	2	4	Nayef Al-Hasawi	Kuwait	DNS	

=== Finals ===
There were two finals, one for the top 8 swimmers and one for the next 8 (9th through 16th).

==== Final B ====
Rank	Lane	Swimmer	Nation	Time
9	4	Paul Palmer	Great Britain	1:48.92
10	5	Kieren Perkins	Australia	1:49.75
11	3	Ian Brown	Australia	1:49.77
12	6	Massimo Trevisan	Italy	1:49.85
13	2	Paul Howe	Great Britain	1:50.15
14	7	Christian Keller	Germany	1:50.46
15	1	Turlough O'Hare	Canada	1:51.01
16	8	John Steel	New Zealand	1:51.12

==== Final A ====
Rank	Lane	Swimmer	Nation	Time	Notes
1st place, gold medalist(s)	4	Yevgeny Sadovyi	Unified Team	1:46.70	OR
2nd place, silver medalist(s)	5	Anders Holmertz	Sweden	1:46.86	
3rd place, bronze medalist(s)	2	Antti Kasvio	Finland	1:47.63	NR
4	1	Artur Wojdat	Poland	1:48.24	
5	3	Vladimir Pyshnenko	Unified Team	1:48.32	
6	7	Joe Hudepohl	United States	1:48.36	
7	6	Steffen Zesner	Germany	1:48.84	
8	8	Doug Gjertsen	United States	1:50.57	
