= Swimming at the 1992 Summer Olympics – Men's 400 metre freestyle =

Men's 400 metre freestyle at the Games of the XXV Olympiad
- Venue: Piscines Bernat Picornell
- Date: 29 July 1992 (heats & finals)
- Competitors: 47 from 32 nations
- Winning time: 3:45.00 WR

Medalists
1st place, gold medalist(s)		Yevgeny Sadovyi	Unified Team
2nd place, silver medalist(s)		Kieren Perkins	Australia
3rd place, bronze medalist(s)		Anders Holmertz	Sweden

The men's 400 metre freestyle event at the 1992 Summer Olympics took place on 29 July at the Piscines Bernat Picornell in Barcelona, Spain.

== Records ==
Prior to this competition, the existing world and Olympic records were as follows.

World record	Kieren Perkins (AUS)	3:46.47	Canberra, Australia	3 April 1992
Olympic record	Uwe Daßler (GDR)	3:46.95	Seoul, South Korea	23 September 1988

The following records were established during the competition:

Date	Round	Name	Nationality	Time	Record
29 July	Final A	Yevgeny Sadovyi	Unified Team	3:45.00	WR

== Results ==
=== Heats ===
Rule: The eight fastest swimmers advance to final A (Q), while the next eight to final B (q).

Rank	Heat	Lane	Name	Nationality	Time	Notes
1	6	4	Kieren Perkins	Australia	3:49.24	Q
2	5	2	Yevgeny Sadovyi	Unified Team	3:49.37	Q, NR
3	5	4	Anders Holmertz	Sweden	3:49.95	Q
4	5	3	Stefan Pfeiffer	Germany	3:49.99	Q
5	5	8	Danyon Loader	New Zealand	3:50.05	Q, NR
6	5	5	Ian Brown	Australia	3:50.12	Q
7	6	3	Sebastian Wiese	Germany	3:50.73	Q
8	4	4	Artur Wojdat	Poland	3:51.66	Q
9	4	3	Antti Kasvio	Finland	3:51.74	q
10	4	6	Paul Palmer	Great Britain	3:51.93	q
11	6	6	Mariusz Podkościelny	Poland	3:52.07	q
12	6	7	Pier Maria Siciliano	Italy	3:52.32	q
13	4	5	Sean Killion	United States	3:52.42	q
14	6	5	Dan Jorgensen	United States	3:53.20	q, WD
15	4	2	Christophe Marchand	France	3:54.59	q
16	4	7	Jure Bučar	Slovenia	3:55.28	q, NR
17	3	4	Yann de Fabrique	France	3:55.66	q
18	2	7	Marcel Wouda	Netherlands	3:55.70	
19	6	2	Massimo Trevisan	Italy	3:56.35	
20	5	6	Zoltán Szilágyi	Hungary	3:56.68	
21	5	1	Turlough O'Hare	Canada	3:56.70	
22	2	4	Aleksey Kudryavtsev	Unified Team	3:57.07	
23	6	8	Uğur Taner	Turkey	3:57.64	
24	3	2	Shigeo Ogata	Japan	3:57.91	
25	3	1	Can Ergenekan	Turkey	3:58.43	
26	2	5	Artur Costa	Portugal	3:58.80	
27	3	5	Edward Parenti	Canada	3:58.96	
28	6	1	Stephen Akers	Great Britain	3:58.99	
29	5	7	Richard Tapper	New Zealand	3:59.71	
30	4	1	Jorge Herrera	Puerto Rico	4:00.11	
31	4	8	Nace Majcen	Slovenia	4:00.42	
32	3	8	Bang Seung-hun	South Korea	4:00.43	
33	2	3	Masashi Kato	Japan	4:00.66	
34	1	1	Hisham Al-Masri	Syria	4:00.69	
35	3	7	Alejandro Bermúdez	Colombia	4:01.66	
36	3	3	Christer Wallin	Sweden	4:02.14	
37	3	6	Jeffrey Ong	Malaysia	4:02.28	
38	2	6	Jarl Inge Melberg	Norway	4:03.49	
39	2	1	Ratapong Sirisanont	Thailand	4:07.95	
40	1	5	Gustavo Bucaro	Guatemala	4:11.48	
41	1	4	Luis Héctor Medina	Bolivia	4:11.77	NR
42	2	2	Benoît Fleurot	Mauritius	4:12.05	
43	2	8	Kenneth Yeo	Singapore	4:13.45	
44	1	3	Helder Torres	Guatemala	4:20.38	
45	1	6	Hussein Al-Sadiq	Saudi Arabia	4:21.44	
46	1	7	Jean-Paul Adam	Seychelles	4:40.93	
	1	2	Carl Probert	Fiji	DNS	

=== Finals ===
==== Final B ====
Rank	Lane	Name	Nationality	Time	Notes
9	4	Antti Kasvio	Finland	3:50.06	NR
10	5	Paul Palmer	Great Britain	3:51.60	
11	2	Sean Killion	United States	3:52.76	
12	6	Pier Maria Siciliano	Italy	3:53.05	
13	7	Christophe Marchand	France	3:53.24	
14	8	Yann de Fabrique	France	3:54.37	
15	3	Mariusz Podkościelny	Poland	3:54.56	
16	1	Jure Bučar	Slovenia	3:56.93	

==== Final A ====
Rank	Lane	Name	Nationality	Time	Notes
1st place, gold medalist(s)	5	Yevgeny Sadovyi	Unified Team	3:45.00	WR
2nd place, silver medalist(s)	4	Kieren Perkins	Australia	3:45.16	OC
3rd place, bronze medalist(s)	3	Anders Holmertz	Sweden	3:46.77	NR
4	8	Artur Wojdat	Poland	3:48.10	
5	7	Ian Brown	Australia	3:48.79	
6	1	Sebastian Wiese	Germany	3:49.06	
7	6	Stefan Pfeiffer	Germany	3:49.75	
8	2	Danyon Loader	New Zealand	3:49.97	NR
