= Swimming at the 1995 European Aquatics Championships – Men's 200 metre freestyle =

The qualifying heats and the finals of the Men's 200 metres Freestyle event at the European LC Championships 1995 were held on Saturday 22 August 1995 in Vienna, Austria.

== Finals ==
RANK	FINAL A	TIME
	Jani Sievinen (FIN)	1:48.98
	Anders Holmertz (SWE)	1:49.12
	Antti Kasvio (FIN)	1:49.24
4.	Torsten Spanneberg (GER)	1:49.32
4.	Pier Maria Siciliano (ITA)	1:49.32
6.	Paul Palmer (GBR)	1:49.48
7.	Pieter van den Hoogenband (NED)	1:50.57
8.	Attila Czene (HUN)	1:52.33

RANK	FINAL B	TIME
9.	Vladimir Pyshnenko (RUS)	1:49.98
10.	Béla Szabados (HUN)	1:50.41
11.	Christian Keller (GER)	1:50.48
12.	Christophe Bordeau (FRA)	1:51.40
13.	Emanuele Idini (ITA)	1:51.42
14.	James Salter (GBR)	1:51.48
15.	Roman Shegolev (RUS)	1:51.96
16.	Earl McCarthy (IRL)	1:52.58

== Qualifying heats ==
RANK	HEATS RANKING	TIME
1.	Anders Holmertz (SWE)	1:49.64
2.	Antti Kasvio (FIN)	1:49.87
3.	Torsten Spanneberg (GER)	1:49.89
4.	Pier Maria Siciliano (ITA)	1:50.01
5.	Paul Palmer (GBR)	1:50.06
6.	Jani Sievinen (FIN)	1:50.08
7.	Attila Czene (HUN)	1:50.14
8.	Pieter van den Hoogenband (NED)	1:50.24
9.	Christian Keller (GER)	1:50.32
10.	Béla Szabados (HUN)	1:50.46
11.	Christophe Bordeau (FRA)	1:50.96
12.	James Salter (GBR)	1:51.20
13.	Roman Shegolev (RUS)	1:51.24
14.	Vladimir Pyshnenko (RUS)	1:51.26
15.	Emanuele Idini (ITA)	1:51.66
16.	Christer Wallin (SWE)	1:51.94
17.	Jarl Inge Melberg (NOR)	1:52.49
18.	Earl McCarthy (IRL)	1:53.03
19.	Christophe Marchand (FRA)	1:53.08
20.	Miroslav Vučetić (CRO)	1:53.16
21.	Manolis Lentaris (GRE)	1:53.29

== See also ==
- 1993 Men's European Championships (LC) 200m Freestyle
- 1995 Men's World Championships (SC) 200m Freestyle
- 1996 Men's Olympic Games 200m Freestyle
- 1997 Men's European Championships (LC) 200m Freestyle
