= 2026 Pan Pacific Swimming Championships – Men's 200 metre freestyle =

Men's 200 metre freestyle at the 2026 Pan Pacific Swimming Championships
- Venue: William Woollett Jr. Aquatics Center
- Dates: August 12
- Competitors: 39 from 11 nations
- Winning time: 1:43.85 CR

Medalists
gold medal	Luke Hobson	United States
silver medal	Gabriel Jett	United States
bronze medal	Zhang Zhanshuo	China

Official Video (heats)

Official Video (B and A final)

The men's 200 metre freestyle event at the 2026 Pan Pacific Swimming Championships was held on August 12 at the William Woollett Jr. Aquatics Center in Irvine, California. It was the fourth of 41 events on the four-day pool swimming program and the 14th edition of the event, which had been contested at every previous championship since 1985. A total of 39 swimmers from 11 nations were listed for the preliminary heats.

The event was won by Luke Hobson of the United States in a championship record time of 1:43.85, breaking the previous record of 1:44.75 set by Australia's Ian Thorpe at the 2002 championships, which had stood for 24 years. His compatriot Gabriel Jett claimed the silver medal in 1:43.96, just 0.11 seconds behind Hobson, becoming the ninth-fastest performer in the history of the men's 200 metre freestyle. Zhang Zhanshuo of China won the bronze medal in 1:44.59, ahead of Japan's Tatsuya Murasa, who finished fourth in 1:44.76.

== Competition format and event history ==
The Pan Pacific Swimming Championships is an international long course swimming competition first held in 1985. It was established as an alternative to the European Championships and is open to nations that are not members of European Aquatics. (Note: At a meeting of the four charter nations of the Pan Pacific Swimming Association (the United States, Australia, Canada and Japan) on August 23, 2024, it was agreed that the 10 kilometre open water events at the 2026 championships would be open to all members of European Aquatics wishing to participate, with a maximum of two entries per nation in each event.) The 2026 championships featured 41 swimming events in the pool across four days, from August 12 to 15, preceded by the men's and women's 10 km open water swimming events on August 10. The men's 200 metre freestyle was the sixth event overall and the fourth on the pool swimming program, following the women's and men's 50 metre butterfly events and the women's 200 metre freestyle.

The event consisted of preliminary heats followed by an A final and a B final, with no semifinals contested. Both the heats and finals were held on August 12, the opening day of pool competition. Under the championship regulations, each nation could enter an unlimited number of swimmers in the preliminary heats. However, only the two fastest eligible swimmers from each nation could advance to the A final, following any withdrawals. Each nation could also qualify up to two additional swimmers for the B final, regardless of whether it had one or two representatives in the A final. Consequently, a maximum of four swimmers per nation could compete across both finals. The eight A finalists contested the medals and championship points, while the B final determined the remaining eligible finishing positions.

The men's 200 metre freestyle was one of 32 events contested at every edition of the Pan Pacific Swimming Championships, making its 2026 appearance the fourteenth in championship history. American Mike Heath won the inaugural title at the 1985 championships in Tokyo in 1:49.29, followed by compatriots Craig Oppel in 1987 in Brisbane in 1:49.12 and Doug Gjertsen in 1989 in Tokyo in 1:49.09. Australia's Ian Brown ended the American winning streak at the 1991 championships in Edmonton, claiming the title in 1:49.48 to become the first Australian winner of the event. American Josh Davis reclaimed the title for the United States at the 1993 championships in Kobe in 1:48.50. Two years later, New Zealand's Danyon Loader won the 1995 title in Atlanta in a national record time of 1:48.72, becoming the first New Zealander to win the event.

At the 1997 championships in Fukuoka, Australia's Michael Klim won in a championship record of 1:47.60. His compatriot Ian Thorpe continued Australia's success at the 1999 championships in Sydney, winning the gold medal in a world record time of 1:46.00. During the semifinals, Thorpe had broken the previous world record of 1:46.67, set by fellow Australian Grant Hackett five months earlier, with a time of 1:46.34. Hackett, who had been suffering from a flu virus, finished third among the Australian swimmers in the semifinals in 1:48.20 and was excluded from the final under the two-swimmers-per-nation qualification rule. Thorpe retained the title at the 2002 championships in Yokohama, winning in a championship record of 1:44.75, a mark that stood for 24 years.

The United States regained the title at the 2006 championships in Victoria, Canada, where Klete Keller won in 1:46.20. His compatriot Ryan Lochte continued the American success at the 2010 championships in Irvine, winning in a personal-best time of 1:45.30. At the 2014 championships on the Gold Coast, Australia's Thomas Fraser-Holmes returned the title to Australia, claiming the gold medal in 1:45.98.

At the 2018 championships in Tokyo, American Andrew Seliskar qualified fastest from the preliminary heats in 1:45.81. In the final, his compatriot Townley Haas established an early lead, while Seliskar adopted a more conservative pace over the opening 100 metres. Seliskar drew level with Haas at the 150-metre mark and briefly took the lead during the final 25 metres. Haas responded by accelerating over the closing 15 metres to win the gold medal in 1:45.56, with Seliskar taking silver in 1:45.74. Japan's Katsuhiro Matsumoto claimed bronze in a personal best time of 1:45.92. The 2022 championships were cancelled due to the COVID-19 pandemic.

== Race summary ==
=== Heats ===
A total of 39 swimmers from 11 nations were listed for the preliminary heats, including nine Americans. Of these, 38 competed, while Australia's Brendon Smith did not start. Smith subsequently contested the men's 400 metre individual medley on August 13, qualifying twelfth overall from the preliminary heats before withdrawing from the B final. Three other swimmers were listed on the initial starting list. South Africa's Kris Mihaylov withdrew from the event to focus on the men's 200 metre butterfly, which was also contested on the opening day. Mihaylov subsequently finished seventh in the A final of the 200 metre butterfly in 1:59.53. Canadians Ruslan Gaziev and Filip Senc-Samardzic also withdrew from the 200 metre freestyle to contest the men's 50 metre butterfly, which was also held on the opening day. Gaziev finished sixth in the B final in 24.03, while Senc-Samardzic placed nineteenth overall in the preliminary heats in 24.19 and did not qualify for either final.

American Luke Hobson recorded the fastest qualifying time of 1:44.31 in the fifth and final heat, breaking the championship record of 1:44.75 set by Australia's Ian Thorpe at the 2002 championships. Hobson improved the previous record by 0.44 seconds, ending its 24-year standing. His compatriot Gabriel Jett qualified second overall in 1:45.04, followed by another American, Aaron Shackell, who recorded a personal-best time of 1:45.19, improving on his previous mark of 1:46.35 by 1.16 seconds. China's Zhang Zhanshuo recorded the fourth-fastest time of 1:45.43, while American Henry McFadden finished fifth overall in 1:45.61. Despite their performances, Shackell and McFadden were assigned to the B final under the two-swimmers-per-nation restriction, with Hobson and Jett occupying the two American places in the A final.

Japan's Tatsuya Murasa qualified sixth overall in 1:46.05, followed by Australians Kai Taylor and Maximillian Giuliani, who tied for seventh in 1:46.06. Japan's Katsuhiro Matsumoto recorded the ninth-fastest time of 1:46.13 and advanced to the A final. Canada's Ethan Ekk also qualified for the A final despite placing twelfth overall in 1:46.43. Americans Patrick Sammon and Keaton Jones, who finished tenth and eleventh overall, were excluded from both finals under the nationality restriction, despite Jones recording a personal-best time of 1:46.30, an improvement of 1.36 seconds on his previous best. Australia's Charlie Hawke and Elijah Winnington qualified for the B final, having finished fourteenth and fifteenth overall, respectively. Further down the standings, the Philippines' Gian Santos finished equal 31st in 1:49.78, setting a Philippine national record by improving on the previous mark of 1:50.29 established by Adrian Eichler in 2025.

=== B final ===
In the evening session, American Aaron Shackell won the B final in 1:45.63, followed by Australia's Charlie Hawke in 1:45.79 and New Zealand's Lewis Clareburt in 1:46.47. Shackell's winning time was faster than those recorded by the fifth- through eighth-place finishers in the A final, although he had been the third-fastest American in the preliminary heats. Australia's Elijah Winnington finished fourth in 1:47.19, matching his fourth-place finish in the B final at the 2018 championships, when he recorded 1:48.04. The Brazilian pair of Stephan Steverink and Murilo Sartori finished fifth and sixth in 1:47.46 and 1:47.70, respectively. Japan's Kazusa Kuroda placed seventh in 1:48.24, while American Henry McFadden finished eighth in 1:48.25.

=== A final ===
Hobson, the 2024 Olympic bronze medalist and silver medalist at the 2025 World Championships, entered the A final as the fastest qualifier, having already broken Thorpe's championship record in the morning heats. In the final, he established an early lead, reaching the halfway mark in 50.12 seconds, under world record pace. He maintained an advantage of 0.73 seconds over compatriot Gabriel Jett at the 100-metre mark, but Jett began closing the gap during the second half of the race. Over the final 50 metres, Jett recorded a split of 26.42 seconds compared with Hobson's 27.09, reducing the deficit considerably. Hobson nevertheless held on to win the gold medal in a championship record time of 1:43.85, just 0.11 seconds ahead of Jett, who finished in 1:43.96. Hobson improved his own championship record by 0.46 seconds, becoming the first swimmer to win the men's 200 metre freestyle at the Pan Pacific Championships in under 1:44. His winning time was 0.90 seconds faster than Thorpe's previous championship record of 1:44.75 and just 0.12 seconds outside his personal best of 1:43.73, which he had established as a U.S. Open record at the 2025 USA Swimming Championships. Following the race, Hobson expressed satisfaction with both his performance and the close contest against Jett, noting that the two had raced against each other for several years. He credited Jett with pushing him to swim faster and welcomed the achievement of having two Americans finish under 1:44.

Jett's silver-medal performance of 1:43.96 represented a substantial personal best, improving on his previous mark of 1:44.70 by 0.74 seconds. It was his first time breaking the 1:44 barrier and made him the ninth-fastest performer in the history of the men's 200 metre freestyle. China's Zhang Zhanshuo secured the bronze medal in 1:44.59, followed by Japan's Tatsuya Murasa, who finished fourth in 1:44.76, just 0.17 seconds outside the medals. Murasa's performance was 0.22 seconds outside his Japanese record of 1:44.54, set at the 2025 World Championships where he won the bronze medal. Australia's Kai Taylor, the reigning Commonwealth Games champion in the event, finished fifth in 1:46.11, ahead of compatriot Maximillian Giuliani in sixth with 1:46.67. Japan's Katsuhiro Matsumoto, the bronze medalist at the 2018 championships, placed seventh in 1:46.87, while Canada's Ethan Ekk completed the A final in eighth place with 1:47.22.

== Records ==
Prior to this competition, the existing records were as follows:

Records before the 2026 Pan Pacific Swimming Championships
Record	Time (s)	Athlete (nation)	Meet	Location	Date	Ref
World record	1:42.00	Paul Biedermann (GER)	2009 World Championships	Rome, Italy	July 28, 2009	
Championship record	1:44.75	Ian Thorpe (AUS)	2002 Pan Pacs	Yokohama, Japan	August 26, 2002	

== Schedule ==
The schedule was as follows:

All times are Pacific Daylight Time (UTC−7)

Schedule
Date	Time	Round
Wednesday, August 12, 2026	10:34	Heats
Wednesday, August 12, 2026	19:37	Finals

== Results ==
=== Heats ===
The heats were held at 10:34 on August 12, 2026.

Key: QA = Qualified for A final; QB = Qualified for B final; R = Reserve; CR = Championship record; NR = National record; DNS = Did not start.

Heat results
Rank	Heat	Lane	Swimmer	Nation	Time	Notes
1	5	4	Luke Hobson	United States	1:44.31	QA, CR
2	4	5	Gabriel Jett	United States	1:45.04	QA
3	3	7	Aaron Shackell	United States	1:45.19	QB
4	4	4	Zhang Zhanshuo	China	1:45.43	QA
5	4	3	Henry McFadden	United States	1:45.61	QB
6	3	4	Tatsuya Murasa	Japan	1:46.05	QA
=7	3	3	Kai Taylor	Australia	1:46.06	QA
=7	4	2	Maximillian Giuliani	Australia	1:46.06	QA
9	5	5	Katsuhiro Matsumoto	Japan	1:46.13	QA
10	3	2	Patrick Sammon	United States	1:46.15	
11	2	3	Keaton Jones	United States	1:46.30	
12	3	1	Ethan Ekk	Canada	1:46.43	QA
13	5	6	Chris Guiliano	United States	1:46.45	
14	3	6	Charlie Hawke	Australia	1:46.47	QB
15	3	8	Elijah Winnington	Australia	1:46.74	QB
16	4	7	Destin Lasco	United States	1:46.91	
17	5	2	William Petric	Australia	1:46.98	
18	5	7	Stephan Steverink	Brazil	1:47.02	QB
19	4	6	Lewis Clareburt	New Zealand	1:47.41	QB
20	5	3	Rex Maurer	United States	1:47.42	
21	4	1	Murilo Sartori	Brazil	1:47.56	QB
22	5	8	Kazusa Kuroda	Japan	1:47.63	QB
23	2	8	Jorge Iga	Mexico	1:47.93	R
24	2	7	Francis Brennan	Canada	1:47.96	R
25	3	5	Edward Sommerville	Australia	1:48.05	
26	2	4	Lorne Wigginton	Canada	1:48.14	
27	2	6	Tristan Jankovics	Canada	1:48.47	
28	2	5	Laon Kim	Canada	1:48.81	
29	1	5	Matthew Caldwell	South Africa	1:49.10	
30	4	8	Konosuke Yanagimoto	Japan	1:49.30	
=31	1	6	Gian Santos	Philippines	1:49.78	NR
=31	2	1	Jordi Vilchez	Canada	1:49.78	
33	1	4	James Leigh	New Zealand	1:49.95	
34	5	1	Antoine Sauve	Canada	1:50.02	
35	1	2	Cameron Casali	South Africa	1:51.24	
36	1	3	David Medina	Mexico	1:51.64	
37	1	7	Arno Kruger	South Africa	1:51.73	
38	1	1	Charles McIntosh	Jamaica	1:58.65	
	2	2	Brendon Smith	Australia	DNS	

=== B final ===
The B final was held at 19:37 on August 12, 2026.

B final results
Rank	Lane	Swimmer	Nation	Time	Notes
9	4	Aaron Shackell	United States	1:45.63	
10	3	Charlie Hawke	Australia	1:45.79	
11	7	Lewis Clareburt	New Zealand	1:46.47	
12	6	Elijah Winnington	Australia	1:47.19	
13	2	Stephan Steverink	Brazil	1:47.46	
14	1	Murilo Sartori	Brazil	1:47.70	
15	8	Kazusa Kuroda	Japan	1:48.24	
16	5	Henry McFadden	United States	1:48.25	

=== A final ===
The A final was held after the B final on August 12, 2026.

A final results
Rank	Lane	Swimmer	Nation	Time	Points (Note: A team trophy was awarded to the nation scoring the most points. In individual events, points were awarded on a 9–7–6–5–4–3–2–1 basis for first through eighth place in the A final. In relay events, points were awarded on an 18–14–12–10–8–6–4–2 basis for the first- through eighth-place teams in the A final. The United States won the team title with 540.5 points, ahead of Australia (409), Japan (228) and Canada (220).)	Notes
1st place, gold medalist(s)	4	Luke Hobson	United States	1:43.85	9	CR
2nd place, silver medalist(s)	5	Gabriel Jett	United States	1:43.96	7	
3rd place, bronze medalist(s)	3	Zhang Zhanshuo	China	1:44.59	6	
4	6	Tatsuya Murasa	Japan	1:44.76	5	
5	2	Kai Taylor	Australia	1:46.11	4	
6	7	Maximillian Giuliani	Australia	1:46.67	3	
7	1	Katsuhiro Matsumoto	Japan	1:46.87	2	
8	8	Ethan Ekk	Canada	1:47.22	1	
