= Swimming at the 1992 Summer Olympics =

Swimming at the Games of the XXV Olympiad
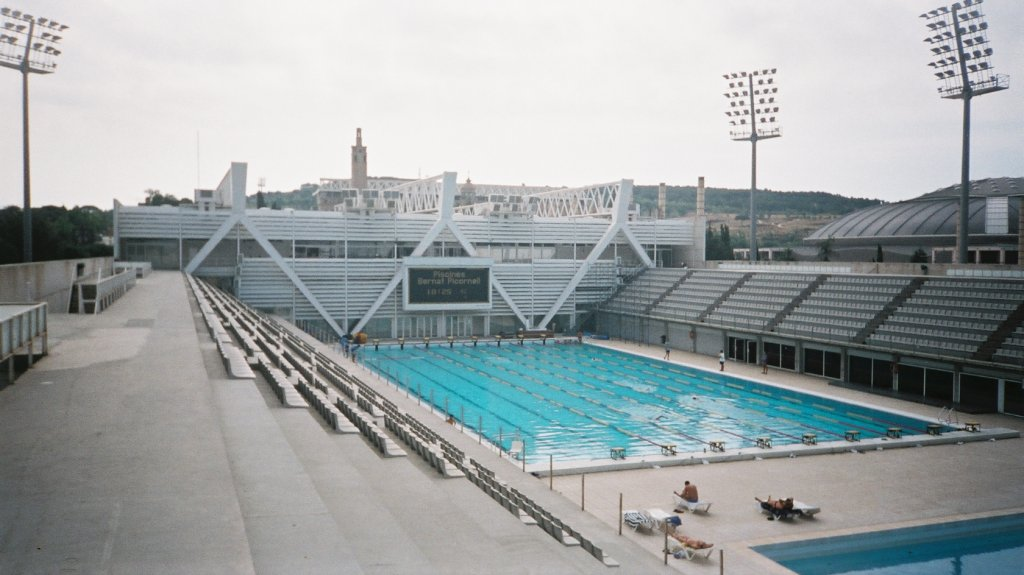
- Piscines Bernat Picornell
- Venue: Piscines Bernat Picornell
- Dates: 26 – 31 July 1992
- No. of events: 31
- Competitors: 641 from 92 nations

At the 1992 Summer Olympics in Barcelona, Spain, 31 swimming events were contested. There was a total of 641 participants from 92 countries competing.

== Medal table ==
Rank	Nation	Gold	Silver	Bronze	Total
1	United States	11	9	7	27
2	Unified Team	6	3	1	10
3	Hungary	5	3	1	9
4	China	4	5	0	9
5	Germany	1	3	7	11
6	Australia	1	3	5	9
7	Canada	1	0	1	2
8	Japan	1	0	0	1
8	Spain	1	0	0	1
10	Sweden	0	2	1	3
11	Brazil	0	1	0	1
11	New Zealand	0	1	0	1
11	Poland	0	1	0	1
14	France	0	0	3	3
15	Italy	0	0	2	2
16	Finland	0	0	1	1
16	Great Britain	0	0	1	1
16	Suriname	0	0	1	1
Totals (18 entries)		31	31	31	93

== Medal summary ==
=== Men's events ===
Games	Gold		Silver		Bronze	
50 m freestyle	Aleksandr Popov; Unified Team (Russia)	21.91 OR, ER	Matt Biondi; United States	22.09	Tom Jager; United States	22.30
100 m freestyle	Aleksandr Popov; Unified Team (Russia)	49.02 ER	Gustavo Borges; Brazil	49.43 SA	Stéphan Caron; France	49.50
200 m freestyle	Yevgeny Sadovyi; Unified Team (Russia)	1:46.70 OR, NR	Anders Holmertz; Sweden	1:46.86	Antti Kasvio; Finland	1:47.63 NR
400 m freestyle	Yevgeny Sadovyi; Unified Team (Russia)	3:45.00 WR	Kieren Perkins; Australia	3:45.16 OC	Anders Holmertz; Sweden	3:46.77 NR
1500 m freestyle	Kieren Perkins; Australia	14:43.48 WR	Glen Housman; Australia	14:55.29	Jörg Hoffmann; Germany	15:02.29
100 m backstroke	Mark Tewksbury; Canada	53.98 OR, NR	Jeff Rouse; United States	54.04	David Berkoff; United States	54.78
200 m backstroke	Martin López-Zubero; Spain	1:58.47 OR	Vladimir Selkov; Unified Team (Russia)	1:58.87	Stefano Battistelli; Italy	1:59.40
100 m breaststroke	Nelson Diebel; United States	1:01.50 OR	Norbert Rózsa; Hungary	1:01.68	Phil Rogers; Australia	1:01.76 OC
200 m breaststroke	Mike Barrowman; United States	2:10.16 WR	Norbert Rózsa; Hungary	2:11.23 ER	Nick Gillingham; Great Britain	2:11.29 NR
100 m butterfly	Pablo Morales; United States	53.32	Rafał Szukała; Poland	53.35 NR	Anthony Nesty; Suriname	53.41
200 m butterfly	Melvin Stewart; United States	1:56.26 OR	Danyon Loader; New Zealand	1:57.93	Franck Esposito; France	1:58.51
200 m individual medley	Tamás Darnyi; Hungary	2:00.76	Greg Burgess; United States	2:00.97	Attila Czene; Hungary	2:01.00
400 m individual medley	Tamás Darnyi; Hungary	4:14.23 OR	Eric Namesnik; United States	4:15.57	Luca Sacchi; Italy	4:16.34 NR
4 × 100 m freestyle relay	United States; Joe Hudepohl (50.05); Matt Biondi (48.69); Tom Jager (49.72); Jon Olsen (48.28); Shaun Jordan*; Joel Thomas*	3:16.74	Unified Team; Pavlo Khnykin (49.92); Gennadiy Prigoda (50.05); Yuri Bashkatov (49.76); Aleksandr Popov (47.83); Vladimir Pyshnenko*; Veniamin Tayanovich*	3:17.56	Germany; Dirk Richter (49.97); Christian Tröger (49.35); Steffen Zesner (49.78); Mark Pinger (48.80); Andreas Szigat*; Bengt Zikarsky*	3:17.90 NR
4 × 200 m freestyle relay	Unified Team; Dmitry Lepikov (1:49.55); Vladimir Pyshnenko (1:46.58); Veniamin Tayanovich (1:48.99); Yevgeny Sadovyi (1:46.83); Aleksey Kudryavtsev*; Yury Mukhin*	7:11.95 WR	Sweden; Christer Wallin (1:49.69); Anders Holmertz (1:46.16); Tommy Werner (1:49.35); Lars Frölander (1:50.31)	7:15.51 NR	United States; Joe Hudepohl (1:49.52); Melvin Stewart (1:48.41); Jon Olsen (1:49.19); Doug Gjertsen (1:49.11); Scott Jaffe*; Dan Jorgensen*	7:16.23
4 × 100 medley relay	United States; Jeff Rouse (53.86) WR; Nelson Diebel (1:01.45); Pablo Morales (52.83); Jon Olsen (48.79); David Berkoff*; Hans Dersch*; Melvin Stewart*; Matt Biondi*	3:36.93 =WR	Unified Team; Vladimir Selkov (55.50); Vasili Ivanov (1:01.59); Pavlo Khnykin (53.56); Aleksandr Popov (47.91); Vladimir Pyshnenko*; Vladislav Kulikov*; Dmitri Volkov*	3:38.56	Canada; Mark Tewksbury (54.09); Jonathan Cleveland (1:01.93); Marcel Gery (53.72); Stephen Clarke (49.92); Tom Ponting*	3:39.66

* Swimmers who participated in the heats only and received medals.

=== Women's events ===
Games	Gold		Silver		Bronze	
50 m freestyle	Yang Wenyi; China	24.79 WR	Zhuang Yong; China	25.08	Angel Martino; United States	25.23
100 m freestyle	Zhuang Yong; China	54.64 OR	Jenny Thompson; United States	54.84	Franziska van Almsick; Germany	54.94
200 m freestyle	Nicole Haislett; United States	1:57.90 AM	Franziska van Almsick; Germany	1:58.00	Kerstin Kielgass; Germany	1:59.67
400 m freestyle	Dagmar Hase; Germany	4:07.18	Janet Evans; United States	4:07.37	Hayley Lewis; Australia	4:11.22
800 m freestyle	Janet Evans; United States	8:25.52	Hayley Lewis; Australia	8:30.34	Jana Henke; Germany	8:30.99
100 m backstroke	Krisztina Egerszegi; Hungary	1:00.68 OR	Tünde Szabó; Hungary	1:01.14	Lea Loveless; United States	1:01.43
200 m backstroke	Krisztina Egerszegi; Hungary	2:07.06 OR	Dagmar Hase; Germany	2:09.46 NR	Nicole Stevenson; Australia	2:10.20 OC
100 m breaststroke	Yelena Rudkovskaya; Unified Team (Belarus)	1:08.00 NR	Anita Nall; United States	1:08.17 AM	Samantha Riley; Australia	1:09.25 OC
200 m breaststroke	Kyoko Iwasaki; Japan	2:26.65 OR, AS	Lin Li; China	2:26.85 NR	Anita Nall; United States	2:26.88
100 m butterfly	Qian Hong; China	58.62 OR	Crissy Ahmann-Leighton; United States	58.74	Catherine Plewinski; France	59.01 NR
200 m butterfly	Summer Sanders; United States	2:08.67	Wang Xiaohong; China	2:09.01 AS	Susie O'Neill; Australia	2:09.03 OC
200 m individual medley	Lin Li; China	2:11.65 WR	Summer Sanders; United States	2:11.91 AM	Daniela Hunger; Germany	2:13.92
400 m individual medley	Krisztina Egerszegi; Hungary	4:36.54 NR	Lin Li; China	4:36.73 AS	Summer Sanders; United States	4:37.58 AM
4 × 100 m freestyle relay	United States; Nicole Haislett (55.33); Dara Torres (55.33); Angel Martino (54.79); Jenny Thompson (54.01); Ashley Tappin*; Crissy Ahmann-Leighton*	3:39.46 WR	China; Zhuang Yong (54.51) OR; Lu Bin (55.90); Yang Wenyi (54.90); Le Jingyi (54.81); Zhao Kun*	3:40.12 AS	Germany; Franziska van Almsick (54.99); Simone Osygus (55.74); Daniela Hunger (55.12); Manuela Stellmach (55.75); Kerstin Kielgass*; Annette Hadding*	3:41.60
4 × 100 m medley relay	United States; Lea Loveless (1:00.82) AM; Anita Nall (1:08.67); Crissy Ahmann-Leighton (58.58); Jenny Thompson (54.47); Janie Wagstaff*; Megan Kleine*; Summer Sanders*; Nicole Haislett*	4:02.54 WR	Germany; Dagmar Hase (1:01.61); Jana Dörries (1:09.43); Franziska van Almsick (59.08); Daniela Hunger (55.07); Daniela Brendel*; Bettina Ustrowski*; Simone Osygus*	4:05.19	Unified Team; Nina Zhivanevskaya (1:02.54); Yelena Rudkovskaya (1:07.44); Olga Kiritchenko (1:00.98); Natalya Meshcheryakova (55.48); Elena Choubina*	4:06.44

* Swimmers who participated in the heats only and received medals.

== Participating nations ==
641 swimmers from 92 nations competed.

- Albania (1)
- Algeria (1)
- Angola (3)
- Argentina (3)
- Australia (33)
- Austria (2)
- Bahamas (2)
- Bangladesh (1)
- Belgium (7)
- Bermuda (6)
- Bolivia (2)
- Bosnia and Herzegovina (2)
- Brazil (9)
- Bulgaria (5)
- Canada (29)
- China (16)
- Republic of the Congo (1)
- Costa Rica (1)
- Colombia (1)
- Cuba (2)
- Cyprus (2)
- Czechoslovakia (8)
- Denmark (8)
- Ecuador (1)
- Egypt (2)
- El Salvador (1)
- Estonia (4)
- Fiji (3)
- Finland (12)
- France (25)
- Germany (34)
- Great Britain (30)
- Greece (2)
- Guam (7)
- Guatemala (5)
- Honduras (4)
- Hong Kong (8)
- Hungary (13)
- Iceland (2)
- Independent Olympic Athletes (4)
- Ireland (2)
- Israel (4)
- Italy (24)
- Japan (25)
- Kuwait (3)
- Latvia (1)
- Lebanon (1)
- Lithuania (2)
- Luxembourg (1)
- Madagascar (1)
- Malaysia (1)
- Maldives (2)
- Mauritius (6)
- Mexico (7)
- Monaco (1)
- Mozambique (3)
- Namibia (2)
- Netherlands (9)
- New Zealand (11)
- Nigeria (2)
- Norway (6)
- Panama (1)
- Paraguay (2)
- Peru (2)
- Philippines (5)
- Poland (14)
- Portugal (9)
- Puerto Rico (6)
- Romania (10)
- San Marino (5)
- Saudi Arabia (2)
- Senegal (2)
- Seychelles (4)
- Singapore (5)
- Slovenia (5)
- South Africa (10)
- South Korea (4)
- Spain (21)
- Sri Lanka (1)
- Suriname (3)
- Sweden (17)
- Switzerland (4)
- Syria (1)
- Thailand (5)
- Turkey (3)
- Unified Team (29)
- United Arab Emirates (5)
- United States (40)
- Virgin Islands (3)
- Uruguay (1)
- Vietnam (2)
- Zimbabwe (4)
