= 1993 FINA World Swimming Championships (25 m) – Men's 400 metre freestyle =

The finals and the qualifying heats of the Men's 400 metres Freestyle event at the 1993 FINA Short Course World Championships were held on the first day of the competition, on 2 December 1993 in Palma de Mallorca, Spain.

== Competition format ==
The event consisted of preliminary heats held in the morning session, with the fastest swimmers advancing to the final held later in the day. Times from the heats were used to determine lane assignments for the final.

== Finals ==
RANK	FINAL A	TIME
	Daniel Kowalski (AUS)	3:42.95
	Antti Kasvio (FIN)	3:42.98
	Paul Palmer (GBR)	3:45.07
4.	Trent Bray (NZL)	3:45.09
5.	Artur Wojdat (POL)	3:45.36
6.	Pier Maria Siciliano (ITA)	3:45.92
7.	Jörg Hoffmann (GER)	3:47.29
8.	Malcolm Allen (AUS)	3:48.06

== Qualifying heats ==
RANK	HEATS RANKING	TIME
1.	Jörg Hoffmann (GER)	3:47.51
2.	Daniel Kowalski (AUS)	3:47.56
3.	Pier Maria Siciliano (ITA)	3:47.70
4.	Antti Kasvio (FIN)	3:48.58
5.	Malcolm Allen (AUS)	3:48.97
6.	Paul Palmer (GBR)	3:49.69
7.	Artur Wojdat (POL)	3:49.70
8.	Trent Bray (NZL)	3:50.28

== See also ==
- 1992 Men's Olympic Games 400m Freestyle
- 1993 Men's European LC Championships 400m Freestyle
