= 1993 Pan Pacific Swimming Championships – Men's 200 metre freestyle =

Men's 200 metre freestyle event

Men's 200 metre freestyle at the 1993 Pan Pacific Swimming Championships
- Venue: Port Island Sports Center
- Dates: August 12, 1993 (heats & finals)
- Competitors: 29 from 9 nations
- Winning time: 1:48.50

Medalists
gold medal	Josh Davis	United States
silver medal	Trent Bray	New Zealand
bronze medal	Uğur Taner	United States

The men's 200 metre freestyle competition at the 1993 Pan Pacific Swimming Championships took place on August 12 at the Port Island Sports Center. The last champion was Ian Brown of Australia.

This race consisted of four lengths of the pool, all in freestyle.

== Records ==
Prior to this competition, the existing world and Pan Pacific records were as follows:

World record	Giorgio Lamberti (ITA)	1:46.69	Bonn, West Germany	August 15, 1989
Pan Pacific Championships record	Doug Gjertsen (USA)	1:49.09	Tokyo, Japan	August 17, 1989

== Results ==
All times are in minutes and seconds.

KEY:	q	Fastest non-qualifiers	Q	Qualified	CR	Championships record	NR	National record	PB	Personal best	SB	Seasonal best

=== Heats ===
The first round was held on August 12.

Rank	Name	Nationality	Time	Notes
1	Josh Davis	United States	1:49.59	QA
2	Uğur Taner	United States	1:49.69	QA
3	Chris Eckerman	United States	1:50.15	QA
4	Greg Burgess	United States	1:50.33	QA
5	Joe Hudepohl	United States	1:50.39	QA
6	Danyon Loader	New Zealand	1:51.11	QA
7	Trent Bray	New Zealand	1:51.34	QA
8	Matthew Dunn	Australia	1:51.37	QA
9	Owen Von Richter	Canada	1:51.82	QB
10	Kieren Perkins	Australia	1:51.83	QB
11	John Steel	New Zealand	1:51.85	QB
12	Turlough O'Hare	Canada	1:51.93	QB
13	Darren Ward	Canada	1:52.04	QB
14	Deane Pieters	Australia	1:52.08	QB
15	Malcolm Allen	Australia	1:52.24	QB
16	Taihei Maeda	Japan	1:52.86	QB
17	Chris Fydler	Australia	1:53.15	
18	Tom Dolan	United States	1:53.20	
19	Rob McFarlane	Canada	1:53.51	
20	Matt Hooper	United States	1:53.71	
21	Hiroshi Fukuda	Japan	1:53.73	
22	Alexey Yegorov	Kazakhstan	1:55.39	
23	Daniel Kowalski	Australia	1:55.40	
24	Tatsuya Kinugasa	Japan	1:55.56	
25	Toshiaki Kurasawa	Japan	1:56.88	
26	Dong-Hyeon Kim	South Korea	1:57.80	
27	Dwade Sheehan	Australia	1:58.46	
28	Darrick Bollinger	Guam	1:59.76	
29	Wisnu Wardhana	Indonesia	1:59.80	

=== B Final ===
The B final was held on August 12.

Rank	Name	Nationality	Time	Notes
9	Chris Eckerman	United States	1:50.12	
10	Taihei Maeda	Japan	1:51.61	
11	Deane Pieters	Australia	1:51.65	
12	Darren Ward	Canada	1:52.61	
13	Hiroshi Fukuda	Japan	1:53.72	
14	Dong-Hyeon Kim	South Korea	1:55.76	
15	Darrick Bollinger	Guam	2:01.21	
-	Alexey Yegorov	Kazakhstan	DSQ	

=== A Final ===
The A final was held on August 12.

Rank	Lane	Nationality	Time	Notes
1st place, gold medalist(s)	Josh Davis	United States	1:48.50	CR
2nd place, silver medalist(s)	Trent Bray	New Zealand	1:49.69	
3rd place, bronze medalist(s)	Uğur Taner	United States	1:49.80	
4	Matthew Dunn	Australia	1:50.99	
5	Turlough O'Hare	Canada	1:51.34	
6	Kieren Perkins	Australia	1:51.43	
7	Owen Von Richter	Canada	1:51.98	
8	John Steel	New Zealand	1:52.90	
