= Yury Mukhin (swimmer) =

Russian swimmer (born 1971)

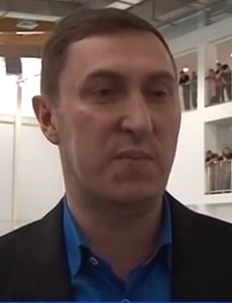
- Mukhin in 2016

Personal information
- Born: August 14, 1971 (age 54)
Medal record
Men's swimming
Representing the Unified Team
Olympic Games
Gold medal – first place	1992 Barcelona	4×200 m freestyle
World Championships (LC)
Representing Russia
Silver medal – second place	1994 Rome	4×200 m freestyle
World Championships (SC)
Representing Russia
Bronze medal – third place	1993 Palma	4×100 m freestyle
Bronze medal – third place	1995 Rio	4×100 m medley
European Championships (LC)
Representing Russia
Gold medal – first place	1993 Sheffield	4×200 m freestyle

Yury Valerievich Mukhin (Russian: Юрий Валериевич Мухин; born August 14, 1971) is a retired Russian freestyle swimmer, who was affiliated with Profsojuzy Samara.

Mukhin is best known for winning the gold medal in the Men's 4 × 200 m Freestyle event at the 1992 Summer Olympics at Barcelona, alongside Vladimir Pyshnenko, Dmitry Lepikov, Veniamin Tayanovich, Aleksey Kudryavtsev (heats) and Yevgeny Sadovyi. He just swam in the preliminary heats.
