= 1991 Pan Pacific Swimming Championships – Men's 200 metre freestyle =

Men's 200 metre freestyle at the 1991 Pan Pacific Swimming Championships
- Venue: Kinsmen Sports Center
- Dates: August 22, 1991 (heats & finals)
- Competitors: 31 from 11 nations
- Winning time: 1:49.48

Medalists
gold medal	Ian Brown	Australia
silver medal	Joe Hudepohl	United States
bronze medal	Darren Ward	Canada

The men's 200 metre freestyle competition at the 1991 Pan Pacific Swimming Championships took place on August 22 at the Kinsmen Sports Center. The last champion was Doug Gjertsen of US.

This race consisted of four lengths of the pool, all in freestyle.

== Records ==
Prior to this competition, the existing world and Pan Pacific records were as follows:

World record	Giorgio Lamberti (ITA)	1:46.69	Bonn, West Germany	August 15, 1989
Pan Pacific Championships record	Doug Gjertsen (USA)	1:49.09	Tokyo, Japan	August 17, 1989

== Results ==
All times are in minutes and seconds.

KEY:	q	Fastest non-qualifiers	Q	Qualified	CR	Championships record	NR	National record	PB	Personal best	SB	Seasonal best

=== Heats ===
The first round was held on August 22.

Rank	Name	Nationality	Time	Notes
1	Joe Hudepohl	United States	1:49.45	QA
2	Jon Olsen	United States	1:49.85	QA
3	Ian Brown	Australia	1:49.96	QA
4	Darren Ward	Canada	1:50.22	QA
5	Dan Jorgensen	United States	1:50.23	QA
6	Troy Dalbey	United States	1:51.35	QA
7	Deane Pieters	Australia	1:52.13	QA
8	Trent Bray	New Zealand	1:52.17	QA
9	Turlough O'Hare	Canada	1:52.18	QB
10	Masayuki Fujimoto	Japan	1:52.38	QB
11	Taihei Maeda	Japan	1:52.95	QB
12	Matt Hooper	United States	1:53.12	QB
13	Sebastien Goulet	Canada	1:53.48	QB
14	John Steel	New Zealand	1:53.49	QB
15	Frank Samel	Canada	1:53.60	QB
16	Kieren Perkins	Australia	1:53.62	QB
17	Toshiaki Kurasawa	Japan	1:54.06	
18	Satoshi Kajitani	Japan	1:54.33	
19	Matthew Dunn	Australia	1:54.48	
20	Yumin Yan	China	1:54.65	
21	Andrew Baildon	Australia	1:54.94	
22	Kelvin Herrod	Australia	1:55.05	
23	Arthur Li	Hong Kong	1:55.16	
24	Chris Fydler	Australia	1:55.78	
25	Tsutomu Nakano	Japan	1:56.26	
26	Jorge Herrera	Puerto Rico	1:56.45	
27	Hidetoshi Yamanaka	Japan	1:56.89	
28	Richard Bera	Indonesia	1:57.30	
29	Kurt Eldridge	Australia	1:58.77	
30	Joaquini Lagier	Costa Rica	1:59.47	
31	Yi-Chung Chen	Chinese Taipei	2:00.02	

=== B Final ===
The B final was held on August 22.

Rank	Name	Nationality	Time	Notes
9	Dan Jorgensen	United States	1:50.63	
10	Kieren Perkins	Australia	1:51.45	
11	Taihei Maeda	Japan	1:52.34	
12	Frank Samel	Canada	1:52.97	
13	Satoshi Kajitani	Japan	1:54.33	
14	John Steel	New Zealand	1:54.42	
15	Arthur Li	Hong Kong	1:54.72	
16	Yumin Yan	China	1:55.07	

=== A Final ===
The A final was held on August 22.

Rank	Lane	Nationality	Time	Notes
1st place, gold medalist(s)	Ian Brown	Australia	1:49.48	
2nd place, silver medalist(s)	Joe Hudepohl	United States	1:49.63	
3rd place, bronze medalist(s)	Darren Ward	Canada	1:50.89	
4	Deane Pieters	Australia	1:51.17	
5	Turlough O'Hare	Canada	1:51.48	
6	Jon Olsen	United States	1:51.93	
7	Trent Bray	New Zealand	1:51.97	
8	Masayuki Fujimoto	Japan	1:52.34	
