= 1995 Pan Pacific Swimming Championships – Men's 200 metre freestyle =

Men's 200 metre freestyle at the 1995 Pan Pacific Swimming Championships
- Venue: Georgia Tech Aquatic Center
- Dates: August 10, 1995 (heats & finals)
- Competitors: 38 from 16 nations
- Winning time: 1:48.72

Medalists
gold medal	Danyon Loader	New Zealand
silver medal	Daniel Kowalski	Australia
bronze medal	Chad Carvin	United States

The men's 200 metre freestyle competition at the 1995 Pan Pacific Swimming Championships took place on August 10 at the Georgia Tech Aquatic Center. The last champion was Josh Davis of US.

This race consisted of four lengths of the pool, all in freestyle.

== Records ==
Prior to this competition, the existing world and Pan Pacific records were as follows:

World record	Giorgio Lamberti (ITA)	1:46.69	Bonn, West Germany	August 15, 1989
Pan Pacific Championships record	Josh Davis (USA)	1:48.50	Kobe, Japan	August 12, 1993

== Results ==
All times are in minutes and seconds.

KEY:	q	Fastest non-qualifiers	Q	Qualified	CR	Championships record	NR	National record	PB	Personal best	SB	Seasonal best

=== Heats ===
The first round was held on August 10.

Rank	Name	Nationality	Time	Notes
1	Chad Carvin	United States	1:49.29	QA
2	Daniel Kowalski	Australia	1:49.55	QA
3	Danyon Loader	New Zealand	1:49.72	QA
4	Malcolm Allen	Australia	1:49.74	QA
5	Matthew Dunn	Australia	1:50.33	QA
6	Jon Olsen	United States	1:50.35	QA
6	Joe Hudepohl	United States	1:50.35	QA
8	Trent Bray	New Zealand	1:50.67	QA
9	Owen Von Richter	Canada	1:50.97	QB
10	John Piersma	United States	1:51.34	QB
11	Hiroshi Fukuda	Japan	1:51.60	QB
12	Michael Klim	Australia	1:51.66	QB
13	Kieren Perkins	Australia	1:53.37	QB
14	Michael McWha	Canada	1:53.50	QB
15	Toshiaki Kurasawa	Japan	1:53.84	QB
16	Richard Upton	Australia	1:53.97	QB
17	Alejandro Bermúdez	Colombia	1:54.40	
18	Darren Ward	Canada	1:54.50	
19	Alexey Yegorov	Kazakhstan	1:54.82	
19	Yun-Ho Koh	South Korea	1:54.82	
21	Simon Eberlie	Canada	1:55.05	
22	Ratapong Sirisanont	Thailand	1:55.23	
23	Francisco Sánchez	Venezuela	1:55.64	
24	John Steel	New Zealand	1:55.69	
25	Nelson Vargas	Mexico	1:55.93	
26	Sebastian Muniz	Peru	1:56.30	
27	Glen Housman	Australia	1:56.69	
28	Fernando Zagacela	Mexico	1:56.92	
29	Scott Cameron	New Zealand	1:57.35	
30	Arthur Li	Hong Kong	1:57.39	
31	Yannick Lupien	Canada	1:58.07	
32	Guillermo Diaz	Mexico	1:58.85	
33	Santiago Lima	Mexico	1:58.97	
34	Jose Isaza	Panama	1:59.37	
35	Archimedes Lim	Philippines	2:00.25	
36	Jose Martinez	Colombia	2:00.42	
37	German Cardenas	Mexico	2:00.56	
38	S.Paddington	Trinidad and Tobago	2:02.10	

=== B Final ===
The B final was held on August 10.

Rank	Name	Nationality	Time	Notes
9	Matthew Dunn	Australia	1:50.02	
10	John Piersma	United States	1:50.08	
11	Michael McWha	Canada	1:51.99	
12	Alexey Yegorov	Kazakhstan	1:53.92	
13	Alejandro Bermúdez	Colombia	1:54.00	
14	Toshiaki Kurasawa	Japan	1:55.02	
15	Yun-Ho Koh	South Korea	1:55.87	
16	Darren Ward	Canada	1:56.18	

=== A Final ===
The A final was held on August 10.

Rank	Lane	Nationality	Time	Notes
1st place, gold medalist(s)	Danyon Loader	New Zealand	1:48.72	NR
2nd place, silver medalist(s)	Daniel Kowalski	Australia	1:49.14	
3rd place, bronze medalist(s)	Chad Carvin	United States	1:49.38	
4	Malcolm Allen	Australia	1:49.68	
5	Joe Hudepohl	United States	1:50.35	
6	Hiroshi Fukuda	Japan	1:51.06	
7	Trent Bray	New Zealand	1:51.82	
8	Owen Von Richter	Canada	1:52.78	
