= Guatemala at the 1992 Summer Olympics =

- IOC code: GUA
- NOC: Guatemalan Olympic Committee

in Barcelona
- Competitors: 14 (12 men and 2 women) in 7 sports
- Flag bearer: Julio Sandoval
- Medals: Gold 0 Silver 0 Bronze 0 Total 0

Summer Olympics appearances (overview)
- 1952; 1956–1964; 1968; 1972; 1976; 1980; 1984; 1988; 1992; 1996; 2000; 2004; 2008; 2012; 2016; 2020; 2024

Guatemala competed at the 1992 Summer Olympics in Barcelona, Spain. 14 competitors, 12 men and 2 women, took part in 27 events in 7 sports.

== Competitors ==
The following is the list of number of competitors in the Games.

Sport	Men	Women	Total
Boxing	2	–	2
Gymnastics	0	1	1
Modern pentathlon	1	–	1
Shooting	3	0	3
Swimming	4	1	5
Weightlifting	1	–	1
Wrestling	1	–	1
Total	12	2	14

== Boxing ==
Men's Bantamweight

- Magno Ruiz

Men's Lightweight

- Mauricio Avila

== Gymnastics ==
Women's Horse Vault

- Luisa Portocarrero

Women's Uneven Bars

- Luisa Portocarrero

Women's Balance Beam

- Luisa Portocarrero

Women's Individual All-Around

- Luisa Portocarrero

== Modern pentathlon ==
One male pentathletes represented Guatemala in 1992.

Men's Individual Competition:

- Sergio Werner Sánchez Gómez – 4860 points (→ 47th place)

== Shooting ==
Men's Running Target, 10 metres

- Julio Sandoval
- Cristian Bermúdez

Mixed Skeet

- Francisco Romero Arribas

== Swimming ==
Men's 50 m Freestyle

- Andrés Sedano

- Heat – 25.53 (→ did not advance, 60th place)

- Gustavo Bucaro

- Heat – 25.84 (→ did not advance, 63rd place)

Men's 100 m Freestyle

- Gustavo Bucaro

- Heat – 54.74 (→ did not advance, 58th place)

- Helder Torres

- Heat – 55.38 (→ did not advance, 61st place)

Men's 200 m Freestyle

- Gustavo Bucaro
- Helder Torres

Men's 400 m Freestyle

- Gustavo Bucaro
- Helder Torres

Men's 1,500 m Freestyle

- Helder Torres

Men's 4 × 100 m Freestyle Relay

- Andrés Sedano, Roberto Bonilla, Helder Torres, and Gustavo Bucaro

- Heat – 3:42.53 (→ did not advance, 17th place)

Men's 4 × 200 m Freestyle Relay

- Andrés Sedano, Helder Torres, Roberto Bonilla, and Gustavo Bucaro

Men's 100 m Breaststroke

- Roberto Bonilla

Men's 200 m Breaststroke

- Roberto Bonilla

Men's 100 m Butterfly

- Gustavo Bucaro

Men's 200 m Individual Medley

- Roberto Bonilla

Men's 400 m Individual Medley

- Roberto Bonilla

Women's 100 m Butterfly

- Blanca Morales

Women's 200 m Butterfly

- Blanca Morales

Men's 4 × 100 m Medley Relay

- Roberto Bonilla, Helder Torres, Gustavo Bucaro, and Andrés Sedano

== Weightlifting ==
Men's Middleweight

- Luis Coronado

== Wrestling ==
Men's Light-Flyweight Greco-Roman

- Mynor Ramírez

== See also ==
- Guatemala at the 1991 Pan American Games
