= Veniamin Tayanovich =

Russian swimmer (born 1967)

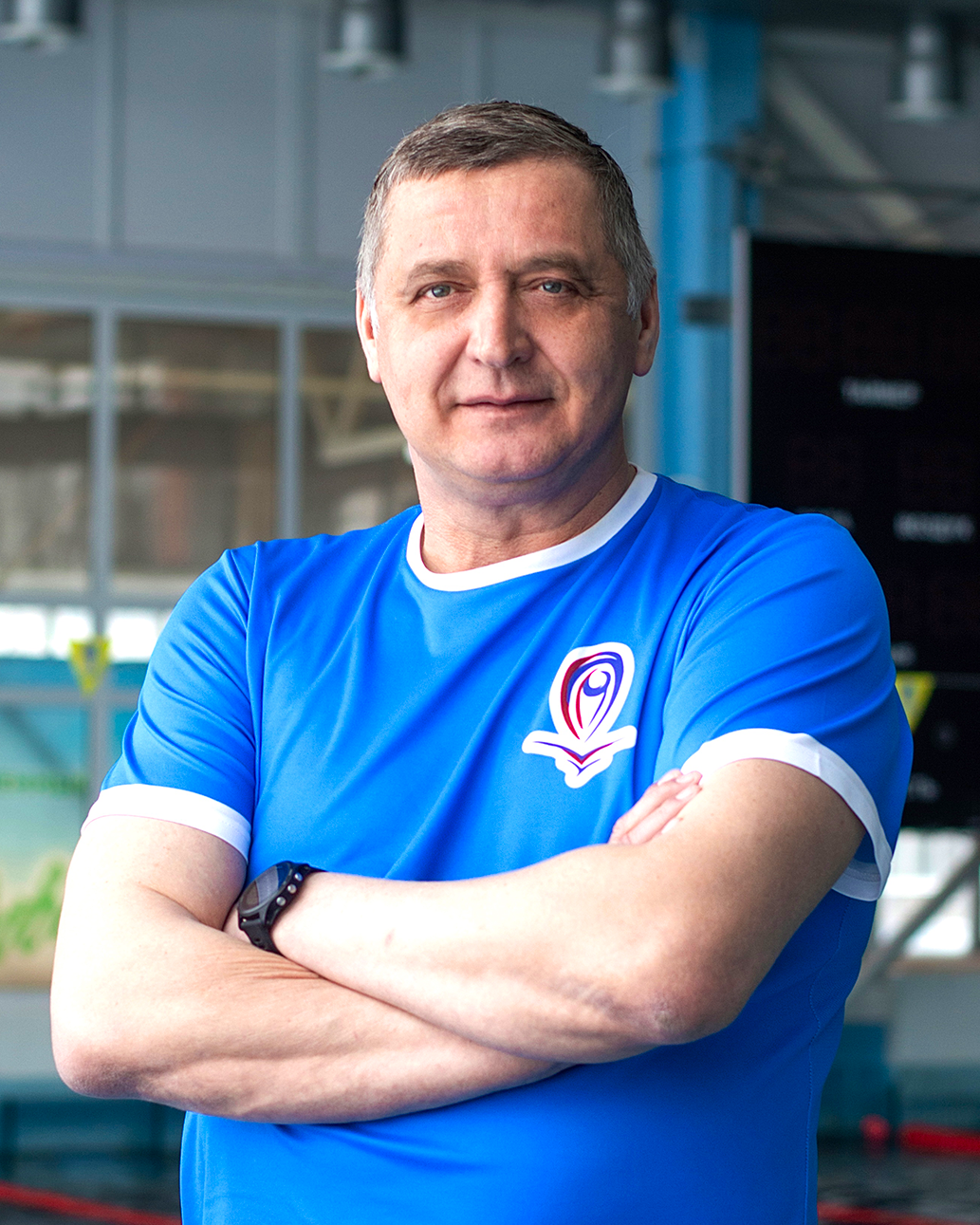

Personal information
- Born: April 6, 1967 (age 59) Ufa, Soviet Union

Sport
- Sport: Swimming
Medal record
Representing the Unified Team
Olympic Games
Gold medal – first place	1992 Barcelona	4×200 m freestyle
Silver medal – second place	1992 Barcelona	4×100 m freestyle
World Championships (LC)
Representing the Soviet Union
Silver medal – second place	1991 Perth	4x100 m medley
Bronze medal – third place	1991 Perth	4×100 m freestyle
European Championships
Representing the Soviet Union
Gold medal – first place	1991 Athens	4×100 m freestyle
Gold medal – first place	1991 Athens	4×200 m freestyle
Bronze medal – third place	1987 Strasbourg	4×100 m freestyle

Veniamin Igorevich Tayanovich (Russian: Вениамин Игоревич Таянович; born 6 April 1967) is a retired Russian freestyle swimmer.

Tayanovich is best known for winning the gold medal in the Men's 4 × 200 m Freestyle event at the 1992 Summer Olympics at Barcelona, alongside Vladimir Pyshnenko, Dmitry Lepikov, Aleksey Kudryavtsev (heats), Yury Mukhin (heats) and Yevgeny Sadovyi. At the same Olympic Games he also claimed the silver medal with the 4 × 100 m freestyle team, swimming in the qualifying heats.
