= Shooting at the 1992 Summer Olympics – Men's 10 metre running target =

Sports shooting at the Olympics

Men's 10 metre running target at the Games of the XXV Olympiad
- Venue: Mollet del Vallès
- Competitors: 24 from 15 nations
- Winning score: 673 (OR)

Medalists
1st place, gold medalist(s)		Michael Jakosits	Germany
2nd place, silver medalist(s)		Anatoli Asrabayev	Unified Team
3rd place, bronze medalist(s)		Luboš Račanský	Czechoslovakia

Men's 10 metre running target shooting made its first Olympic appearance at the 1992 Summer Olympics, replacing 50 metre running target on the programme. The events are similar, the main changes being the shortened distance (and correspondingly shortened target path), the use of airguns instead of small-bore rifles, and the circular target as opposed to the 50 metre target depicting a wild boar. Michael Jakosits became the inaugural champion and established two Olympic records.

== Qualification round ==
Rank	Athlete	Country	Slow	Fast	Total	Notes
1	Michael Jakosits	Germany	290	290	580	Q OR
2	Anatoli Asrabayev	Unified Team	295	284	579	Q
3	Jens Zimmermann	Germany	292	286	578	Q
4	Andrey Vasiliev	Unified Team	293	283	576	Q
5	Jozsef Sike	Hungary	292	284	576	Q
6	Luboš Račanský	Czechoslovakia	290	286	576	Q
7	Kim Man-chol	North Korea	290	283	573	
8	Shu Qingquan	China	290	283	573	
9	Miroslav Januš	Czechoslovakia	290	282	572	
10	Tor Heiestad	Norway	289	282	571	
11	Carlo Colombo	Italy	289	281	570	
11	Rusty Hill	United States	287	283	570	
13	Attila Solti	Hungary	286	283	569	
14	Jorge Rios	Cuba	287	281	568	
15	Francis Allen	United States	285	279	564	
15	Eduard Ilyav	Israel	288	276	564	
17	Julio Sandoval	Guatemala	282	281	563	
18	Zhang Ronghui	China	282	279	561	
19	Valerio Donnianni	Italy	282	273	555	
20	Cristian Bermúdez	Guatemala	289	265	554	
21	Hernando Barrientos	Colombia	278	270	548	
22	David Chapman	Great Britain	272	275	547	
22	Li Yong-chol	North Korea	277	270	547	
24	Jean-Luc Tricoire	France	254	258	512	

OR Olympic record – Q Qualified for semifinal

== Final ==
Rank	Athlete	Qual	Final	Total	Shoot-off	Notes
1st place, gold medalist(s)	Michael Jakosits (GER)	580	93	673		OR
2nd place, silver medalist(s)	Anatoli Asrabayev (EUN)	579	93	672		
3rd place, bronze medalist(s)	Luboš Račanský (TCH)	576	94	670		
4	Andrey Vasiliev (EUN)	576	91	667	?	
5	Jozsef Sike (HUN)	576	91	667	?	
6	Jens Zimmermann (GER)	578	89	667		

OR Olympic record

== Sources ==
- Games of the XXV Olympiad Barcelona 1992: The results (PDF).
