= Aleksey Kudryavtsev =

Russian swimmer (born 1972)

Personal information
- Born: 28 October 1972 (age 53) Moscow, Soviet Union
Medal record
Men's swimming
Representing the Unified Team
Olympic Games
Gold medal – first place	1992 Barcelona	4×200 m freestyle

Aleksey Kudryavtsev (Russian: Алексей Кудрявцев; born 28 October 1972) is a retired Russian freestyle swimmer, who was affiliated with Profsoyuzy Moskva. He is the father of three time 2013, 2014 and 2015 World All-Around Rhythmic Gymnastics Gold Medalists Yana Kudryavtseva.

Kudryavtsev is best known for winning the gold medal in the Men's 4 × 200 m Freestyle event at the 1992 Summer Olympics at Barcelona, alongside Vladimir Pyshnenko, Dmitry Lepikov, Veniamin Tayanovich, Yury Mukhin (heats) and Yevgeny Sadovyi. He just swam in the preliminary heats.
