= Horter =

Horter is a surname of German origin. Notable people with the surname include:

- Charles Horter (born 1947), American competitive sailor
- Franck Horter (born 1967), French swimmer
