= Hernando Barrientos =

Colombian sports shooter

Personal information
- Full name: Hernando Juan Barrientos Gómez
- Nationality: Colombia
- Born: 5 January 1953 (age 73)

Sport
- Sport: Shooting
Medal record
Representing Colombia
Men's Shooting
Event	1st	2nd	3rd
World Championships	0	0	1
Pan American Games	0	1	1
Total	0	1	2
World Championships
Bronze medal – third place	1978 Seoul	50 m running target team
Pan American Games
Silver medal – second place	1983 Caracas	50 m running target team
Bronze medal – third place	1991 Havana	50 m running target team

Hernando Barrientos (born 5 January 1953) is a Colombian sports shooter. He competed in the men's 10 metre running target event at the 1992 Summer Olympics.
