= Rusty Hill =

American sports shooter

Personal information
- Nationality: American
- Born: December 27, 1970 (age 55) Orange, California, United States

Sport
- Sport: Sports shooting

Rusty Hill (born December 27, 1970) is an American sports shooter. He competed in the men's 10 metre running target event at the 1992 Summer Olympics.
