= 1997 Pan Pacific Swimming Championships – Men's 200 metre freestyle =

Swimming competition in 1997

Men's 200 metre freestyle at the 1997 Pan Pacific Swimming Championships
- Venue: NISHI Civic Pool
- Dates: August 10, 1997 (heats & finals)
- Competitors: 19 from 8 nations
- Winning time: 1:47.60

Medalists
gold medal	Michael Klim	Australia
silver medal	Josh Davis	United States
bronze medal	Trent Bray	New Zealand

The men's 200 metre freestyle competition at the 1997 Pan Pacific Swimming Championships took place on August 10 at the NISHI Civic Pool. The last champion was Danyon Loader of New Zealand.

This race consisted of four lengths of the pool, all in freestyle.

== Records ==
Prior to this competition, the existing world and Pan Pacific records were as follows:

World record	Giorgio Lamberti (ITA)	1:46.69	Bonn, West Germany	August 15, 1989
Pan Pacific Championships record	Josh Davis (USA)	1:48.50	Kobe, Japan	August 12, 1993

== Results ==
All times are in minutes and seconds.

KEY:	q	Fastest non-qualifiers	Q	Qualified	CR	Championships record	NR	National record	PB	Personal best	SB	Seasonal best

=== Heats ===
The first round was held on August 10.

Rank	Name	Nationality	Time	Notes
1	Tom Dolan	United States	1:49.89	QA
2	Michael Klim	Australia	1:49.91	QA
3	Josh Davis	United States	1:49.92	QA
4	John Piersma	United States	1:50.12	QA
5	Trent Bray	New Zealand	1:50.34	QA
6	Shunsuke Ito	Japan	1:50.91	QA
7	Ian van der Wal	Australia	1:50.95	QA
8	Grant Hackett	Australia	1:51.20	QA
9	Brad Schumacher	United States	1:51.41	QB
10	Ian Thorpe	Australia	1:51.46	QB
11	Yosuke Ichikawa	Japan	1:51.53	QB
12	Ryk Neethling	South Africa	1:51.94	QB
13	Mark Johnston	Canada	1:52.40	QB
14	Matthew Dunn	Australia	1:52.66	QB
15	Danyon Loader	New Zealand	1:52.69	QB
16	Sion Brinn	Jamaica	1:54.37	QB
17	Michael McWha	Canada	1:54.55	
18	Owen Von Richter	Canada	1:55.51	
19	Scott Cameron	New Zealand	1:56.41	

=== B Final ===
The B final was held on August 10.

Rank	Name	Nationality	Time	Notes
9	Grant Hackett	Australia	1:49.53	
10	John Piersma	United States	1:50.22	
11	Danyon Loader	New Zealand	1:51.66	
12	Mark Johnston	Canada	1:51.72	
13	Scott Cameron	New Zealand	1:54.03	
14	Michael McWha	Canada	1:54.43	
–	Owen Von Richter	Canada	DNS	
–	Sion Brinn	Jamaica	DNS	

=== A Final ===
The A final was held on August 10.

Rank	Lane	Nationality	Time	Notes
1st place, gold medalist(s)	Michael Klim	Australia	1:47.60	CR
2nd place, silver medalist(s)	Josh Davis	United States	1:48.17	
3rd place, bronze medalist(s)	Trent Bray	New Zealand	1:49.27	
4	Ian van der Wal	Australia	1:50.48	
5	Ryk Neethling	South Africa	1:50.94	
6	Shunsuke Ito	Japan	1:50.95	
7	Yosuke Ichikawa	Japan	1:51.87	
8	Tom Dolan	United States	1:54.02	
