= Francis Allen (sport shooter) =

American sports shooter (born 1961)

Personal information
- Born: November 26, 1961 (age 63); New London, Wisconsin, United States

Sport
- Sport: Sports shooting

Francis Allen (born November 26, 1961) is an American sports shooter. He competed in the men's 10 metre running target event at the 1992 Summer Olympics.
