= Swimming at the 1994 World Aquatics Championships – Men's 200 metre individual medley =

Men's 200 metre individual medley at the 1994 FINA World Championships
- Date: 11 September 1994
- Competitors: 38
- Winning time: 1 minute 58.16 seconds

Medalists
gold medal	Jani Sievinen	Finland
silver medal	Greg Burgess	United States
bronze medal	Attila Czene	Hungary

The men's 200 metre individual medley at the 1994 World Aquatics Championships took place on 11 September 1994 at Foro Italico in Rome, Italy.

The existing records at the start of the event were:

- World record (WR): 1:59.36, Tamás Darnyi (Hungary), 13 January 1991 in Perth, Australia.
- Championship record (CR): same as World record

== Results ==
=== A Final ===
Rank	Name	Nationality	Time	Notes
1st place, gold medalist(s)	Jani Sievinen	Finland	1:58.16	WR
2nd place, silver medalist(s)	Greg Burgess	United States	2:00.86	
3rd place, bronze medalist(s)	Attila Czene	Hungary	2:01.84	
4	Eric Namesnik	United States	2:02.01	
5	Christian Keller	Germany	2:02.67	
6	Xavier Marchand	France	2:03.05	
7	Serguei Mariniuk	Moldova	2:04.31	
8	Jirka Letzin	Germany	2:04.70	

== See also ==
- Swimming at the 1991 World Aquatics Championships – Men's 200 metre individual medley
- Swimming at the 1996 Summer Olympics – Men's 200 metre individual medley
- Swimming at the 1998 World Aquatics Championships – Men's 200 metre individual medley
