= Anatoly Asrabayev =

Uzbekistani sport shooter (born 1968)

Personal information
- Full name: Anatoly Khamidullayevich Asrabayev
- Born: May 5, 1968 (age 58) Tashkent, Uzbek SSR, Soviet Union
Medal record
Men's shooting
Representing Unified Team
Olympic Games
| Silver medal – second place | 1992 Barcelona | 10 m running target |

Anatoly Khamidullayevich Asrabayev (Анатолий Хамидуллаевич Асрабаев; born May 5, 1968) is an Uzbekistani sport shooter who competed for the Unified Team. He won the silver medal in 10 metre running target in Barcelona in the 1992 Summer Olympics in Barcelona. Asrabayev was born in Tashkent and was affiliated with Dynamo Tashkent.
