= Li Yong-chol (sport shooter) =

North Korean sports shooter

Personal information
- Nationality: North Korean
- Born: 20 February 1967 (age 58)

Sport
- Sport: Sports shooting

Li Yong-chol (born 20 February 1967) is a North Korean sports shooter. He competed in the men's 10 metre running target event at the 1992 Summer Olympics.
