= Tommy Werner =

Swedish swimmer

Personal information
- Full name: Tommy Henrik Werner
- Nationality: Swedish
- Born: 31 March 1966 (age 60) Karlskrona, Sweden
- Height: 1.90 m (6 ft 3 in)

Sport
- Sport: Swimming
- Strokes: Freestyle
- Club: Karlskrona SS
- College team: University of California, Berkeley
Medal record
Men's swimming
Representing Sweden
Olympic Games
| Silver medal – second place | 1992 Barcelona | 4×200 m freestyle |
World Championships (LC)
| Gold medal – first place | 1994 Rome | 4×200 m freestyle |
| Silver medal – second place | 1991 Perth | 100 m freestyle |
European Championships (LC)
| Silver medal – second place | 1985 Sofia | 4×200 m freestyle |
| Silver medal – second place | 1993 Sheffield | 100 m freestyle |
| Silver medal – second place | 1993 Sheffield | 4×100 m freestyle |
| Bronze medal – third place | 1985 Sofia | 200 m freestyle |
| Bronze medal – third place | 1985 Sofia | 4×100 m freestyle |
| Bronze medal – third place | 1987 Strasbourg | 4×200 m freestyle |
| Bronze medal – third place | 1989 Bonn | 4×100 m freestyle |
| Bronze medal – third place | 1991 Athens | 4×100 m freestyle |
World Championships (SC)
| Gold medal – first place | 1993 Palma | 4×200 m freestyle |

Tommy Henrik Werner (born 31 March 1966) is a Swedish former freestyle swimmer. He won the silver medal in the men's 4 × 200 m freestyle relay at the 1992 Summer Olympics together Christer Wallin, Anders Holmertz and Lars Frölander. He was affiliated with the University of California, Berkeley.

== Personal bests ==
=== Long course (50 m) ===
| Event | Time | Date | Meet | Location | Ref |
|---|---|---|---|---|---|
| 100 m freestyle | 49.60 | 2 August 1990 | - | Landskrona, Sweden | |
| 200 m freestyle | 1:49.87 | 1 August 1987 | Swedish Championships | Gothenburg, Sweden | |

Legend: WR – World record; ER – European record; NR – Swedish record;
Records not set in finals: h – heat; sf – semifinal; r – relay 1st leg; rh – relay heat 1st leg; b – B final; † – en route to final mark; so – swim-off; tt – time trial

=== Short course (25 m) ===
| Event | Time | Date | Meet | Location | Ref |
|---|---|---|---|---|---|
| 100 m freestyle | 48.33 | 19 March 1989 | Swedish SC Championships | Malmö, Sweden | |

Legend: WR – World record; ER – European record; NR – Swedish record;
Records not set in finals: h – heat; sf – semifinal; r – relay 1st leg; rh – relay heat 1st leg; b – B final; † – en route to final mark; so – swim-off; tt – time trial

== Clubs ==
- Karlskrona SS
