= Eduard Alayev =

Israeli sports shooter

Personal information
- Born: אדוארד אלייב; December 4, 1967 (age 58) Russia
- Height: 172 cm (5 ft 8 in)
- Weight: 74 kg (163 lb)

Sport
- Country: Israel
- Sport: Sport shooting
- Event: Men's 10 metre running target

Eduard Alayev (Hebrew: אדוארד אלייב; also Ilyav or Elyav; born December 4, 1967) is an Israeli former Olympic sport shooter.

He is Jewish, and was born in Russia. He lives in Tel Aviv, Israel, and is 172 cm (5 ft 8 in) tall and weighs 73 kg (161 lb).

== Sport shooting career ==
He started competing in 1981, and his coach is Marcel Cohen.

He competed for Israel at the 1992 Summer Olympics in Barcelona in Shooting at the 1992 Summer Olympics – Men's 10 metre running target at the age of 24, and came in tied for 15th with a score of 564.

In World Cup competitions in the running target, he won one gold medal (Guatemala City 1992), one silver medal (Milan 1993), and one bronze medal (Guatemala City 1994). He finished 28th at the 1998 Munich World Cup running target competition. He finished 36th in the running target competition at the 1999 Milan World Cup, with a score of 555 total points.
