= Scott Jaffe =

American swimmer (born 1969)

Personal information
- Full name: Scott Erik Jaffe
- National team: United States
- Born: April 29, 1969 (age 57) Boston, Massachusetts, U.S.
- Height: 6 ft 4 in (1.93 m)
- Weight: 185 lb (84 kg)

Sport
- Sport: Swimming
- Strokes: Freestyle
- Club: Gator Swim Club, Waltham, Mass; Fort Lauderdale Swim Team (FLST)
- College team: Harvard University; U. of California, Berkeley
- Coach: Joe Bernal (Harvard); Nort Thornton (Berkeley)
Medal record
Men's swimming
Representing the United States
Olympic Games
Bronze medal – third place	1992 Barcelona	4x200 m freestyle

Scott Erik Jaffe (born April 29, 1969) is an American former competition swimmer for the University of California Berkeley and an Olympic medalist. Jaffe won a bronze medal representing the United States at the 1992 Summer Olympics in Barcelona, Spain in the 4x200-meter freestyle relay.

Born in Boston on April 20, 1969, Jaffe grew up in Lexington, Massachusetts. He started swimming with the Chelmsford Gators, in Massachusetts, coached by talented Coach Joe Bernal, who would later coach Jaffe at Harvard. Swimming with the Gator club at the age of 10, Jaffe competed in the New England 10 and under tournament at Brown University. Jaffe later attended Lexington High School, graduating around 1987. At age 16, representing Lexington High at the February, 1985 Massachusetts State Swimming Championship, Jaffe took only a third place in the 100-breaststroke with a 1:01.44, and a fourth place in the 200-yard individual medley with a 2:01.34, but had considerable improvement through the following year.

Jaffe continued to swim and train with Waltham, Massachusett's Gator Swim Club during his High School years, when he took a third place in the 400 IM with a time of 4:01.45, and won the 800-yard freestyle relay at the Junior Olympic Championships in Orlando, Florida in April, 1986. Jaffe helped carry the Gator Swim Club to the team championship.

== Breaststroke record ==
In July 1986, while still at Lexington High, Jaffe set an Olympic Festival record in the 200-meter breaststroke with a time of 2:20.74, finishing the race with a five meter lead. The record had been set in 1982, and was the first festival record broken in three years. Jaffe had been somewhat hampered in his training after breaking his arm playing soccer the previous summer. Jaffe also won a gold medal at the Olympic Festival in the 400-meter Individual Medley with a time of 4:35.80. Earlier in the 100-meter breaststroke Scott finished second with a time of 1:07.04 to rival Seth Van Neerden who finished a second earlier. Neerden had swum against Jaffe before in the Junior Olympics.

== 1988 Olympic trials ==
Jaffe attended the 1988 Olympic trials in August in Austin, swimming in a 400 meter freestyle relay, but failed to make the American team. Disappointed, he stopped swimming for eight months afterwards. In the preliminaries of the 200-meter individual medley, swimming for the Bernal's Gators Swim Club, Jaffe placed 51 with a time of 2:10.69, failing to qualify for the finals. He placed 19th in the 200 breaststroke with a time of 2:20.67, with only the top eight making the finals.

== College swimming ==
=== Harvard ===
He started college at Harvard University around the 1987-88 school year, where he won All American honors swimming in 1987 as a Freshman. Jaffe set records for Harvard in the 200-yard breaststroke, Individual Medley and freestyle. Jaffe's Harvard Coach Joe Bernal brought advances to the dolphin kick used in butterfly as well as the turns made in butterfly and backstroke which benefitted Jaffe's technique.

Jaffe left the Harvard team in 1988. Low on funds, he worked with a Cambridge bank, and competed and trained with a Club team called the Boston Scrods, where he switched from a focus on the Individual Medley and breaststroke, to freestyle sprinting. The Scrods focused more on quality, technique, and stroke efficiency, rather than pure distance training. Composed largely of Harvard students and alumni, they practiced at Harvard's Blodgett Pool, and had no coach in 1989, but many outstanding swimmers, including Dirk Marshall, who co-founded and helped lead the team. In 2014, Marshall would receive the Kerry Brian Coaches Award from United States Masters Swimming for his work with Walnut Creek Masters in Walnut Creek, California in the San Francisco Bay area. In the late 80's, Jaffe trained with Jack Nelson's Fort Lauderdale Swim Team (FLST), particularly when he was preparing for the Fort Lauderdale Open on June 24, 1989. At the Fort Lauderdale Open, Jaffe placed third in the 200-meter breaststroke with a 2:27.78, and placed first place in the 400-meter freestyle with a 4:08.71, leading the FLST team to place second in the meet.

=== U. Cal Berkeley ===
Jaffe transferred to the University of California, Berkeley on scholarship in the fall of 1989, where he swam for the California Golden Bears swimming and diving team under Head Coach Nort Thornton. Thornton also acted as an Assistant Coach at the Barcelona Olympics when Jaffe attended in 1992. At Berkeley, Jaffe became a frequent competitor, gaining endurance and speed by swimming all the freestyle distances from 50 to 1000 yards, and most of the relays. But he continued to excel in the 200 freestyle. In 1991, he was rated 17th in the 200 free-style globally, but was ranked 11th in the event in America. By the end of 1991, he had moved up to 5th in America in the 200 freestyle. By 1992 at the University of California Berkeley, he had won All-American honors three times.

== 1992 Barcelona Summer Olympics ==
In the 1992 Olympic qualifiers, Scott finished fourth in the 200 meter freestyle with a time of 1:49.33 which was enough to make the Olympic relay team as the top six men qualify for the 4x200 freestyle relay. Earlier, he was fifth in the preliminaries of the event with a time of 1:49.65.

Jaffe earned a bronze medal by swimming for the third-place U.S. team in the preliminary heat of the men's 4×200-meter freestyle relay which qualified the United States Team for the finals. Jaffe swam in the first position in Heat 3 of the last qualifying round and received a time of 1:50.14 for his 200-meter swim.

In 1995, Jaffe worked as a financial consultant for Merrill Lynch in Burlington.

== See also ==
- List of Olympic medalists in swimming (men)
- List of University of California, Berkeley alumni
