= Julio Sandoval =

Guatemalan sports shooter

Personal information
- Nationality: Guatemalan
- Born: 13 June 1971 (age 53)

Sport
- Sport: Sports shooting

Julio Sandoval (born 13 June 1971) is a Guatemalan sports shooter. He competed in the men's 10 metre running target event at the 1992 Summer Olympics.
