= Antti Kasvio =

Finnish swimmer (born 1973)

Personal information
- Full name: Antti Alexander Kasvio
- Nationality: Finland
- Born: 20 December 1973 (age 52) Espoo, Finland

Sport
- Sport: Swimming
- Strokes: Freestyle
- Club: Laaksolahden Viri
Medal record
Men's swimming
Representing Finland
Olympic Games
Bronze medal – third place	1992 Barcelona	200 m freestyle
World Championships (LC)
Gold medal – first place	1994 Rome	200 m freestyle
Silver medal – second place	1994 Rome	400 m freestyle
World Championships (SC)
Gold medal – first place	1993 Palma	200 m freestyle
Silver medal – second place	1993 Palma	400 m freestyle
European Championships (LC)
Gold medal – first place	1993 Sheffield	200 m freestyle
Gold medal – first place	1993 Sheffield	400 m freestyle
Bronze medal – third place	1995 Vienna	200 m freestyle
European Championships (SC)
Silver medal – second place	1992 Espoo	100 m medley

Antti Alexander Kasvio (born 20 December 1973 in Espoo) is a former freestyle swimmer from Finland who won the bronze medal in the 200 m freestyle at the 1992 Summer Olympics in Barcelona, Spain. Together with Jani Sievinen he was Finland's leading swimmer in the 1990s.

At the 1993 European Swimming Championships (long course) in Sheffield, Kasvio won the 200 and the 400 m freestyle. A year later, at the 1994 World Aquatics Championships in Rome, Italy, he won the world title in the 200 m freestyle and captured the silver medal in the 400 m freestyle.
