= Benoît Fleurot =

Mauritian swimmer (born 1973)

Personal information
- Born: 26 April 1973 (age 53)

Sport
- Sport: Swimming
Medal record
Representing Mauritius
African Games
Silver medal – second place	1991 Harare	1500m freestyle
Bronze medal – third place	1991 Harare	400m individual medley

Benoît Fleurot (born 26 April 1973) is a Mauritian swimmer. He competed in four events at the 1992 Summer Olympics.
