= Duncan Armstrong =

Australian swimmer (born 1968)

Duncan Armstrong OAM
Personal information
- Full name: Duncan John D'Arcy Armstrong
- National team: Australia
- Born: 7 April 1968 (age 58) Rockhampton, Queensland
- Height: 188 cm (6 ft 2 in)
- Weight: 74 kg (163 lb)

Sport
- Sport: Swimming
- Strokes: Freestyle
- Club: Western Australia
- College team: University of Florida
Medal record
Men's swimming
Representing Australia
Olympic Games
Gold medal – first place	1988 Seoul	200 m freestyle
Silver medal – second place	1988 Seoul	400 m freestyle
Commonwealth Games
Gold medal – first place	1986 Edinburgh	400 m freestyle
Gold medal – first place	1986 Edinburgh	4 x 200 m freestyle

Duncan John D'Arcy Armstrong OAM (born 7 April 1968) is an Australian former competitive swimmer, Olympic champion, and former world record-holder. Armstrong is best remembered for winning a gold and silver medal at the 1988 Summer Olympics.

== Early life ==
Armstrong was born in the Queensland city of Rockhampton, and began swimming at the age of five. He attended Rockhampton State High School from 1981 to 1983. Convinced of his potential as a competitive swimmer, his family moved to Brisbane where he began training with the A.C.I. Lawrence Swimming Club as a teenager under flamboyant coach Laurie Lawrence. While training with coach Lawrence, Armstrong swam alongside 1984 Olympic gold medallist Jon Sieben; he viewed Sieben as a role model, and emulating Sieben's Olympic success became Armstrong's goal. He attended the selective Brisbane State High School in Brisbane, where he was captain of the school's swim team. Armstrong graduated from State High in 1985.

== International swimming career ==
Armstrong made his international swimming debut in the 1986 Commonwealth Games in Edinburgh, Scotland. He won his first gold medal in the 400-metre freestyle in dramatic fashion by surging from behind after trailing by nearly 25 metres at the midway point of the race. Armstrong earned his second gold medal as a member of the winning Australian team in the 4×200-metre freestyle relay.

Armstrong arrived in Seoul for the 1988 Summer Olympics ranked 46th in the world, facing a trio of past and current world record holders in the men's 200-metre freestyle: Matt Biondi of the United States, Artur Wojdat of Poland, and Michael Gross of West Germany. Although not favored to win, Armstrong had developed a strong sense of confidence after years of 20 km per day of training. "You look down your lane and know you've done everything you possibly can and you're prepared for this race. Someone has got to win it. Why not me?" As a back-end swimmer, Lawrence planned for Armstrong to swim as close to Biondi's adjacent lane as possible, with Armstrong effectively drafting or surfing the American's wake. At 150 metres, Armstrong was in third place, but he surged past Sweden's Anders Holmertz and then Biondi in the final 25 metres to claim the gold medal with a new world-record time of 1 minute 47.25 seconds. Holmertz placed second (1:47.89), and Biondi finished third (1:47.99).

Later, in the men's 400-metre freestyle, Armstrong was once again slow out of the blocks, turning last at the 100-metre mark, and still being second-to-last at the 300-metre mark. However he finished strong, and in a photo finish, claimed the silver medal with a time of 3:47.14 behind East German Uwe Dassler's new world-record time of 3:46.95. He had cut more than five seconds off his previous personal best; all three medallists—Dassler, Armstrong and Artur Wojdat—broke the previous 400-metre freestyle world record. Armstrong was also a member of the Australian team that finished fourth in the men's 4×200-metre freestyle relay. For his Olympic successes, he was awarded the Young Australian of the Year award for 1988.

Armstrong attended the University of Florida in Gainesville, Florida, where he swam for the Florida Gators swimming and diving team under coach Randy Reese in 1988 and 1989. He won Southeastern Conference titles in the 500-yard freestyle and the 400- and 800-yard freestyle relays, and was named an All-American in the 400- and 800-metre freestyle relays in 1989.

Armstrong was again the favourite at the 1990 Commonwealth Games in Auckland, New Zealand. However, a bout of glandular fever forced him to withdraw. He was selected to compete at the 1992 Summer Olympics in Barcelona as a member of the Australian team in the men's 4×200-metre freestyle relay, but the Australians were disqualified in the event final. He retired from competitive swimming after the 1992 Olympics. In June 1998, at the age of 30, he announced that he would come out of retirement and commence training for the 200-metre freestyle for the 2000 Summer Olympics, as Australia was expected to be a favourite in the 4×200-metre freestyle relay event in Sydney. However, after two months of training, Armstrong announced that he would abandon his comeback and retire again.

== Life after competition swimming ==
Armstrong married American Olympic swimmer Tami Bruce in 1989; they have two sons. Armstrong and Bruce later divorced. He has three children with his second wife, Rebecca. He is a practicing Christian, and often speaks on Christian-related subjects.

Armstrong has worked as an expert swimming commentator on Channel Nine's Wide World of Sports; he has presented the swimming coverage for Fox Sports, and hosted Fox Sports Central on Sunday. He is a well-known swimming safety advocate, and has also coached young swimmers. He has been a commercial spokesman for Centrum multivitamins and Cardiotech fitness equipment.

He received a Medal of the Order of Australia in recognition of service to swimming in 1989, an Australian Sports Medal in 2000, and a Centenary Medal for service to Australian society through the sport of swimming in 2001. He was inducted into the Sport Australia Hall of Fame in 1993, the International Swimming Hall of Fame in 1996, and the Queensland Sport Hall of Fame in 2009.

== See also ==
- List of members of the International Swimming Hall of Fame
- List of Australian Olympic medalists in swimming
- List of Commonwealth Games medallists in swimming (men)
- List of Olympic medalists in swimming (men)
- List of University of Florida alumni
- List of University of Florida Olympians
- World record progression 200 metres freestyle

== Bibliography ==
- Afremow, Jim, The Champion's Mind: How Great Athletes Think, Train, and Thrive, Rodale Books, New York, New York, pp. 182–187 (2013). ISBN 978-1-62336-148-8.
- Andrews, Malcolm, Australia at the Olympic Games, Australian Broadcasting Corporation Books, Sydney, New South Wales, pp. 13–14 (2000). ISBN 0-7333-0884-8.
