= Cristian Bermúdez =

Guatemalan sports shooter

Personal information
- Nationality: Guatemalan
- Born: 30 January 1973 (age 52)

Sport
- Sport: Sports shooting

Cristian Bermúdez (born 30 January 1973) is a Guatemalan sports shooter. He competed in the men's 10 metre running target event at the 1992 Summer Olympics.
