= Christer Wallin =

Swedish swimmer

Personal information
- Born: 17 June 1969 (age 57) Timrå, Sweden
Medal record
Men's swimming
Representing Sweden
Olympic Games
Silver medal – second place	1992 Barcelona	4×200 m freestyle
Silver medal – second place	1996 Atlanta	4×200 m freestyle
World Championships (LC)
Gold medal – first place	1994 Rome	4×200 m freestyle
European Championships (LC)
Silver medal – second place	1995 Vienna	4×200 m freestyle
Bronze medal – third place	1995 Vienna	4×100 m freestyle
World Championships (SC)
Gold medal – first place	1993 Palma	4×200 m freestyle

Bengt Christer Wallin (born 17 June 1969) is a Swedish former freestyle swimmer. He won the silver medal in the 4 × 200 m freestyle relay at the 1992 Summer Olympics together Tommy Werner, Anders Holmertz and Lars Frölander.

Four years later, when Atlanta, Georgia hosted the Summer Olympics, Wallin was on the team that once again captured the silver medal, this time alongside Frölander, Holmertz, and Anders Lyrbring. Wallin competed in three consecutive Summer Olympics for his native country, starting in 1988.

== Clubs ==
- Umeå SS
- Mölndals ASS
