= Franck Horter =

French swimmer

Personal information
- Born: 18 June 1967 (age 59) Mulhouse, France

Sport
- Sport: Swimming

Franck Horter (born 18 June 1967 in Mulhouse) is a French freestyle swimmer. He competed in one event at the 1992 Summer Olympics.

== Fraud Allegations ==
Horter and several members of his family have been implicated in a fraud and embezzlement case in France, regarding their management of the Mulhouse Olympic Swimming club.
