= Attila Czene =

Hungarian swimmer (born 1974)

Secretary of State for Sports of the Ministry of National Resources
- In office 2 June 2010 – 8 October 2012
- Minister: Miklós Réthelyi; Zoltán Balog
- Succeeded by: István Simicskó

Attila Czene
Personal information
- Full name: Attila Czene
- National team: Hungary
- Born: 20 June 1974 (age 52) Szeged, Csongrád, Hungary
- Height: 1.85 m (6 ft 1 in)
- Weight: 76 kg (168 lb)

Sport
- Sport: Swimming
- Strokes: Medley
- Club: Budapesti Rendészeti; Sportegyesület; OTP-Sport Plusz Sportegyesület; Sport-Plusz Mahart; Sportegyesület
- College team: Arizona State University (USA)
- Coach: Mike Chasson (USA)
Medal record
Men's swimming
Representing Hungary
Olympic Games
Gold medal – first place	1996 Atlanta	200 m medley
Bronze medal – third place	1992 Barcelona	200 m medley
World Championships (LC)
Bronze medal – third place	1994 Rome	200 m medley
Bronze medal – third place	1994 Rome	4×100 m medley
Bronze medal – third place	1998 Perth	4×100 m medley
European Championships (LC)
Silver medal – second place	1993 Sheffield	200 m medley
Silver medal – second place	1995 Vienna	200 m medley
Silver medal – second place	1995 Vienna	4×100 m medley

Attila Czene (born 20 June 1974) is a former medley swimmer from Hungary, who won the gold medal in the 200 m individual medley at the 1996 Summer Olympics in Atlanta, Georgia. He competed in three consecutive Summer Olympics for his native country, starting in 1992.

== Awards ==
- Cross of Merit of the Republic of Hungary – Bronze Cross (1992)
- Order of Merit of the Republic of Hungary – Officer's Cross (1996)
- Hungarian swimmer of the Year (2): 1996, 2000
- Immortal of Hungarian swimming (2014)

Records
Preceded by Jani Sievinen	Men's 200-metre individual medley world record-holder (short course); 23 March 2000 – 25 March 2004	Succeeded by George Bovell
