= Stephen Akers =

British swimmer

Personal information
- Nationality: United Kingdom
- Born: 16 May 1971 (age 54) Shoreham-by-Sea, United Kingdom
- Height: 1.90 m (6 ft 3 in)
- Weight: 82 kg (181 lb)

Sport
- Sport: Swimming

Stephen Akers (born 16 May 1971) is a male retired British swimmer. He competed in the 1992 Summer Olympics. He represented England in the 1,500 metres freestyle, at the 1990 Commonwealth Games in Auckland, New Zealand.
