= Jani Sievinen =

Finnish swimmer

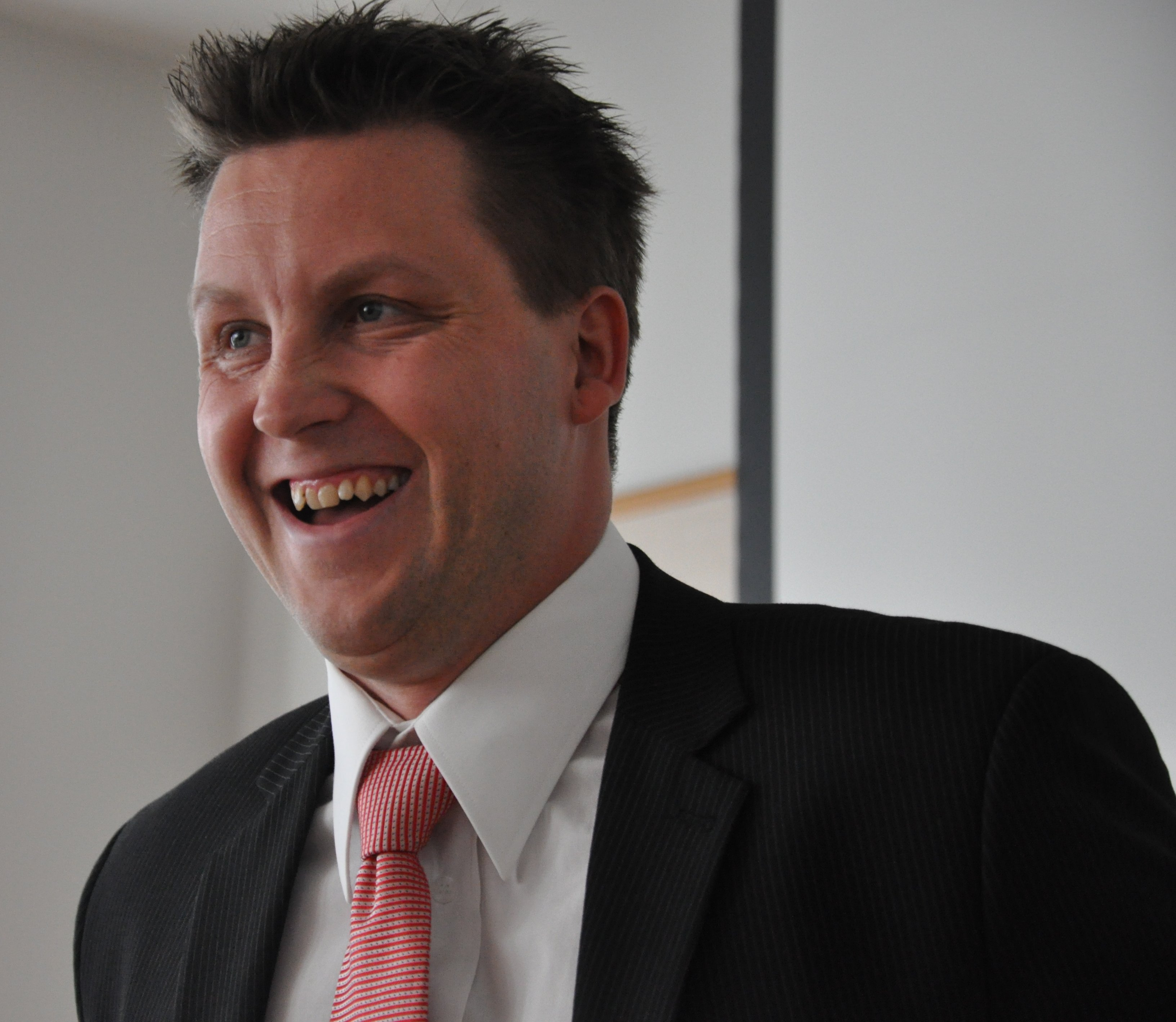
- Jani Sievinen in 2009

Personal information
- Full name: Jani Nikanor Sievinen
- Nationality: Finland
- Born: 31 March 1974 (age 52) Vihti, Finland
- Height: 1.81 m (5 ft 11 in)

Sport
- Sport: Swimming
- Strokes: Backstroke and medley
- Club: Nummelan Kisaajat
Medal record
Event	1st	2nd	3rd
Olympic Games	0	1	0
World Championships (LC)	1	1	0
World Championships (SC)	4	2	0
European Championships (LC)	5	2	2
European Championships (SC)	8	3	2
Total	18	9	4
Men's swimming
Representing Finland
Olympic Games
Silver medal – second place	1996 Atlanta	200 m medley
World Championships (LC)
Gold medal – first place	1994 Rome	200 m medley
Silver medal – second place	1994 Rome	400 m medley
World Championships (SC)
Gold medal – first place	1999 Hong Kong	100 m medley
Gold medal – first place	2000 Athens	200 m medley
Gold medal – first place	2000 Athens	400 m medley
Gold medal – first place	2002 Moscow	200 m medley
Silver medal – second place	2000 Athens	100 m medley
Silver medal – second place	2002 Moscow	100 m medley
European Championships (LC)
Gold medal – first place	1993 Sheffield	200 m medley
Gold medal – first place	1995 Vienna	200 m freestyle
Gold medal – first place	1995 Vienna	200 m medley
Gold medal – first place	1995 Vienna	400 m medley
Gold medal – first place	2002 Berlin	200 m medley
Silver medal – second place	1993 Sheffield	400 m medley
Silver medal – second place	2004 Madrid	200 m medley
Bronze medal – third place	1997 Seville	200 m medley
Bronze medal – third place	1999 Istanbul	200 m medley
European Championships (SC)
Gold medal – first place	1991 Gelsenkirchen	50 m backstroke
Gold medal – first place	1992 Espoo	50 m backstroke
Gold medal – first place	1992 Espoo	100 m medley
Gold medal – first place	1992 Espoo	4×50 m medley
Gold medal – first place	1998 Sheffield	100 m medley
Gold medal – first place	2002 Rijeka	200 m medley
Gold medal – first place	2003 Dublin	100 m medley
Gold medal – first place	2003 Dublin	200 m medley
Silver medal – second place	2001 Antwerp	200 m medley
Silver medal – second place	2002 Rijeka	100 m medley
Silver medal – second place	2002 Rijeka	4×50 m medley
Bronze medal – third place	1998 Sheffield	200 m medley
Bronze medal – third place	2001 Antwerp	100 m medley

Jani Nikanor Sievinen (pronounced [ˈjɑni ˈsie̯ʋinen]; born 31 March 1974) is a former medley swimmer from Finland, who won the silver medal in the 200 m individual medley at the 1996 Summer Olympics in Atlanta, Georgia. In winning the World Championship 200m individual medley title in 1994, he established a new world record of 1:58.16 which lasted for almost nine years until it was broken by Michael Phelps (USA).

Jani Sievinen was married to Mari Sievinen. They have three daughters (born 2008, 2010 and 2013). Sievinen also has two sons (born 1997 and 2001) from his previous marriage to Susanna Sievinen.

Records
Preceded by Tamás Darnyi	World Record Holder; Men's 200 Individual Medley; 11 September 1994 – 29 June 2003	Succeeded by Michael Phelps
Preceded by -	World Record Holder; Men's 100 Individual Medley (25m); 23 January 1996 – 18 March 2000	Succeeded by Neil Walker
Preceded by -	World Record Holder; Men's 200 Individual Medley (25m); 17 January 1992 – 23 March 2000	Succeeded by Attila Czene
Preceded by Luca Sacchi	World Record Holder; Men's 400 Individual Medley (25m); 9 February 1993 – 1 February 1997	Succeeded by Marcel Wouda
