= Anders Holmertz =

Swedish swimmer (born 1968)

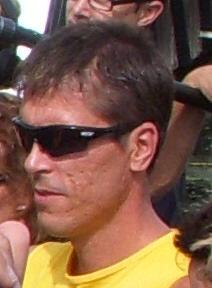
- Anders Holmertz (2009)

Personal information
- Full name: Anders Sören Holmertz
- Born: 1 December 1968 (age 57) Motala, Sweden
- Height: 1.85 m (6 ft 1 in)

Sport
- Sport: Swimming
- Strokes: Freestyle
- Club: Motala SS
Medal record
Men's swimming
Representing Sweden
Olympic Games
Silver medal – second place	1988 Seoul	200 m freestyle
Silver medal – second place	1992 Barcelona	200 m freestyle
Silver medal – second place	1992 Barcelona	4x200 m freestyle
Silver medal – second place	1996 Atlanta	4x200 m freestyle
Bronze medal – third place	1992 Barcelona	400 m freestyle
World Championships (LC)
Gold medal – first place	1994 Rome	4×200 m freestyle
Silver medal – second place	1994 Rome	200 m freestyle
World Championships (SC)
Gold medal – first place	1993 Palma de Mallorca	4×200 m freestyle
Silver medal – second place	1997 Gothenburg	4×100 m freestyle
Silver medal – second place	1997 Gothenburg	4×200 m freestyle
European Championships (LC)
Gold medal – first place	1987 Strasbourg	200 m freestyle
Silver medal – second place	1985 Sofia	4×200 m freestyle
Silver medal – second place	1993 Sheffield	4×100 m freestyle
Silver medal – second place	1995 Vienna	200 m freestyle
Silver medal – second place	1995 Vienna	4×200 m freestyle
Bronze medal – third place	1987 Strasbourg	4×200 m freestyle
Bronze medal – third place	1989 Bonn	200 m freestyle
Bronze medal – third place	1989 Bonn	4×100 m freestyle
Bronze medal – third place	1991 Athens	4×100 m freestyle
Bronze medal – third place	1993 Sheffield	200 m freestyle
Bronze medal – third place	1993 Sheffield	400 m freestyle
Bronze medal – third place	1995 Vienna	400 m freestyle
Bronze medal – third place	1995 Vienna	4×100 m freestyle

Anders Holmertz (born 1 December 1968) is a Swedish retired swimmer who was a leader in freestyle (200 and 400 meters) races in the 1980s and at the beginning of the 1990s, though often missing personal success. He also set a record in the 400 m freestyle. He is the brother of another Swedish swimmer, Mikael Holmertz.

His first appearance at Olympic Games is in 1984 at Los Angeles, at the age of sixteen. Holmertz missed the final of 200 m freestyle, with the time of 1:51.70. He scored his first international medal at the European Championships of Sofia one year later, arriving 3rd in the 4×200 m freestyle relay.

Homertz achieved his main success at the next edition of European Championship, winning 200 m freestyle with the time of 1:48.44, beating rising Italian star Giorgio Lamberti. At Seoul he was the favourite in this race but surprisingly finished second behind Duncan Armstrong. Also a relative failure was the next European Championship, where Holmertz was only third in the 200 m freestyle.

After a series of fourth places, he trained well for the 1992 Summer Olympics. After a startling battery series, Holmertz was second in the 200 m behind the Russian surprise Yevgeny Sadovyi and third in the 400 m, again beat by Sadovyi and by Kieren Perkins. Holmertz won another silver medal in 4×200 m freestyle relay, the best result ever for his national team.

At the 1993 European Championship Holmertz won bronze medal in the 200 m and silver medal in the 400 m, both in freestyle. At the 1994 World Championship in Rome Holmertz finally won a gold medal, in the 4×200 m freestyle, plus a solo second place in the 200 m. His last success was a silver medal in the 4×200 m freestyle relay at Atlanta in 1996, after a 5th place in the 200 m solo race.

== Personal bests ==
=== Long course (50 m) ===
Event	Time		Date	Meet	Location	Ref
100 m freestyle	49.94		11 Aug 1990	-	Rome, Italy	
200 m freestyle	1:46.76	NR (h)	26 Jul 1992	Olympic Games	Barcelona, Spain	
400 m freestyle	3:46.77	NR	29 Jul 1992	Olympic Games	Barcelona, Spain	
800 m freestyle	8:02.78	NR	22 Mar 1988	US Summer Nationals	Orlando, Florida, United States	

Legend: WR – World record; ER – European record; NR – Swedish record;
Records not set in finals: h – heat; sf – semifinal; r – relay 1st leg; rh – relay heat 1st leg; b – B final; † – en route to final mark; so – swim-off; tt – time trial

=== Short course (25 m) ===
Event	Time		Date	Meet	Location	Ref
100 m freestyle	48.74		26 Mar 1994	World Cup	Paris, France	
200 m freestyle	1:44.69	NR	1 Mar 1991	-	Palma de Mallorca, Spain	
400 m freestyle	3:40.81	NR	4 Feb 1990	-	Paris, France	
800 m freestyle	7:58.70		27 Mar 1994	World Cup	Paris, France	

Legend: WR – World record; ER – European record; NR – Swedish record;
Records not set in finals: h – heat; sf – semifinal; r – relay 1st leg; rh – relay heat 1st leg; b – B final; † – en route to final mark; so – swim-off; tt – time trial

== Titles ==
=== FINA World Aquatics Championships ===
- 1994 World Aquatics Championships: 4 × 200 m freestyle

=== European LC Championships ===
- European LC Championships 1987: 200 m freestyle

=== European Junior Swimming Championships ===
- 1983 European Junior Swimming Championships: 1500 m freestyle

=== Swedish Swimming Championships ===
- 1984 Swedish Swimming Championships: 200 m freestyle, 400 m freestyle, 800 m freestyle, 1500 m freestyle
- 1985 Swedish Swimming Championships: 200 m freestyle, 400 m freestyle, 800 m freestyle, 1500 m freestyle
- 1986 Swedish Swimming Championships: 200 m freestyle, 400 m freestyle, 800 m freestyle, 1500 m freestyle
- 1987 Swedish Swimming Championships: 400 m freestyle
- 1988 Swedish Swimming Championships: 200 m freestyle, 400 m freestyle
- 1989 Swedish Swimming Championships: 200 m freestyle, 400 m freestyle
- 1990 Swedish Swimming Championships: 200 m freestyle, 400 m freestyle
- 1991 Swedish Swimming Championships: 100 m freestyle, 200 m freestyle, 400 m freestyle, 1500 m freestyle
- 1992 Swedish Swimming Championships: 200 m freestyle, 400 m freestyle
- 1993 Swedish Swimming Championships: 100 m freestyle, 200 m freestyle, 400 m freestyle, 200 m individual medley, 4 × 200 m freestyle, 4 × 100 m medley
- 1994 Swedish Swimming Championships: 100 m freestyle, 200 m freestyle, 400 m freestyle, 4 × 200 m freestyle, 4 × 100 m medley
- 1995 Swedish Swimming Championships: 200 m freestyle, 400 m freestyle, 200 m individual medley, 4 × 200 m freestyle, 4 × 100 m medley
- 1996 Swedish Swimming Championships: 100 m freestyle, 200 m freestyle, 400 m freestyle, 200 m individual medley, 4 × 200 m freestyle

=== Swedish Short Course Swimming Championships ===
- 1984 Swedish Short Course Swimming Championships: 400 m freestyle, 1500 m freestyle
- 1985 Swedish Short Course Swimming Championships: 400 m freestyle, 1500 m freestyle
- 1986 Swedish Short Course Swimming Championships: 400 m freestyle, 4 × 200 m freestyle
- 1987 Swedish Short Course Swimming Championships: 400 m freestyle
- 1988 Swedish Short Course Swimming Championships: 200 m freestyle, 400 m freestyle
- 1989 Swedish Short Course Swimming Championships: 200 m freestyle, 400 m freestyle
- 1990 Swedish Short Course Swimming Championships: 200 m freestyle, 400 m freestyle
- 1991 Swedish Short Course Swimming Championships: 200 m freestyle, 400 m freestyle, 200 m individual medley
- 1992 Swedish Short Course Swimming Championships: 200 m freestyle, 400 m freestyle, 100 m individual medley, 200 m individual medley
- 1993 Swedish Short Course Swimming Championships: 100 m freestyle, 200 m freestyle, 400 m freestyle, 100 m individual medley
- 1994 Swedish Short Course Swimming Championships: 100 m freestyle, 200 m freestyle, 400 m freestyle, 4 × 100 m freestyle, 4 × 200 m freestyle, 4 × 100 m medley
- 1995 Swedish Short Course Swimming Championships: 200 m freestyle, 400 m freestyle, 4 × 100 m freestyle, 4 × 200 m freestyle
- 1996 Swedish Short Course Swimming Championships: 100 m freestyle, 200 m freestyle, 400 m freestyle
- 1997 Swedish Short Course Swimming Championships: 100 m freestyle, 400 m freestyle, 4 × 100 m freestyle

== See also ==
- World record progression 400 metres freestyle

== Clubs ==
- Motala SS
- Spårvägens SF
