= Hussein Al-Sadiq (swimmer) =

Saudi Arabian swimmer

Hussain Al-Sadiq
Personal information
- Nationality: Saudi Arabia
- Born: 16 August 1971 (age 53)

Sport
- Sport: Swimming

Hussein Al-Sadiq (born 16 August 1971) is a Saudi Arabian swimmer. He competed in the 1992 Summer Olympics.
