= Andreas Szigat =

German swimmer

Personal information
- Born: September 27, 1971 (age 54) Frankfurt an der Oder, West Germany

Sport
- Sport: Swimming
Medal record
Representing Germany
Olympic Games
Bronze medal – third place	1992 Barcelona	4x100 m freestyle relay
World Championships
Bronze medal – third place	1994 Rome	4x200m freestyle relay

Andreas Szigat (born 27 September 1971) is a German former swimmer who competed in the 1992 Summer Olympics.
