= Andrés Sedano =

Guatemalan swimmer (born 1973)

Personal information
- Born: August 14, 1973 (age 52)

Sport
- Sport: Swimming

Andrés Sedano (born 14 August 1973) is a Guatemalan former swimmer who competed in the 1992 Summer Olympics.
