= Roberto Bonilla =

Guatemalan swimmer (born 1971)

Personal information
- Born: September 28, 1971 (age 54)

Sport
- Sport: Swimming

Roberto Bonilla (born 28 September 1971) is a Guatemalan former swimmer who competed in the 1992 Summer Olympics and in the 1996 Summer Olympics.
