= Massimo Trevisan =

Italian swimmer (born 1968)

Personal information
- Born: January 20, 1968 (age 58) Cinisello Balsamo, Italy

Sport
- Sport: Swimming
- Club: Centro Sportivo Carabinieri
Medal record
Representing Italy
European Championships
Gold medal – first place	1989 Bonn	4x200m freestyle relay
Mediterranean Games
Gold medal – first place	1987 Latakia	4x200m freestyle relay
Gold medal – first place	1987 Latakia	4x100m medley relay
Silver medal – second place	1987 Latakia	4x100m freestyle relay
Silver medal – second place	1987 Latakia	200m freestyle
Silver medal – second place	1987 Latakia	400m freestyle

Massimo Trevisan (born 20 January 1968) is an Italian former freestyle swimmer who competed in the 1988 Summer Olympics and in the 1992 Summer Olympics.
