= Malcolm Allen (swimmer) =

Australian swimmer (born 1973)

Personal information
- Full name: Malcolm James Allen
- National team: Australia
- Born: 29 May 1973 (age 53) Wauchope, New South Wales
- Height: 1.85 m (6 ft 1 in)
- Weight: 74 kg (163 lb)

Sport
- Sport: Swimming
- Strokes: Freestyle
- Club: ICI Maroubra
Medal record
Men's swimming
Representing Australia
World Championships (SC)
Gold medal – first place	1995 Rio	4x200m freestyle
Bronze medal – third place	1995 Rio	400m freestyle
Pan Pacific Championships
Gold medal – first place	1995 Atlanta	4x200m freestyle
Silver medal – second place	1993 Kobe	4x200m freestyle

Malcolm James Allen (born 29 May 1973) is a former freestyle swimmer who competed for Australia at the 1996 Summer Olympics. He placed 13th in the 400-metre freestyle, and ended up fourth with the men's 4x200-metre freestyle relay team. A year earlier, at the 1995 FINA Short Course World Championships in Rio de Janeiro, he won the bronze medal in the 400m Freestyle.

On 23 June 2000, Allen was awarded the Australian Sports Medal for his swimming achievements.
