= Trent Bray (swimmer) =

New Zealand swimmer (born 1973)

Personal information
- Full name: Trent Anthony Bray
- Nationality: New Zealand
- Born: 1 September 1973 (age 52) Auckland, New Zealand

Sport
- Sport: Swimming
- Strokes: Freestyle
Medal record
Men's swimming
Representing New Zealand
World Championships (SC)
Gold medal – first place	1995 Rio de Janeiro	4×100 m medley
Silver medal – second place	1993 Palma	200 m freestyle
Silver medal – second place	1995 Rio de Janeiro	200 m freestyle
Silver medal – second place	1997 Gothenburg	200 m freestyle
Pan Pacific Championships
Silver medal – second place	1993 Kobe	200 m freestyle
Bronze medal – third place	1993 Kobe	4×200 m freestyle
Bronze medal – third place	1995 Atlanta	4×100 m freestyle
Bronze medal – third place	1995 Atlanta	4×200 m freestyle
Bronze medal – third place	1997 Fukuoka	200 m freestyle
Bronze medal – third place	1997 Fukuoka	4×100 m freestyle
Bronze medal – third place	1997 Fukuoka	4×200 m freestyle
Commonwealth Games
Silver medal – second place	1994 Victoria	200 m freestyle
Silver medal – second place	1994 Victoria	4×100 m freestyle
Silver medal – second place	1994 Victoria	4×200 m freestyle
Bronze medal – third place	1998 Kuala Lumpur	4×200 m freestyle

Trent Anthony Bray (born 1 September 1973) is a former freestyle swimmer and surf lifesaver from New Zealand, who competed at two consecutive Summer Olympics. He also won three gold medals and three bronze at the 1998 World Surf Lifesaving Championships

== Early life ==
Bray was born in Auckland and attended Lynfield College.

== Olympic Games ==
- 1992 in Barcelona, Spain. 200m Freestyle (26th), 4 × 100 m Freestyle Relay – Men (9th), 4 × 200 m Freestyle Relay – Men (11th)
- 1996 in Atlanta, United States. – 200m Freestyle (20th), 4 × 100 m Freestyle Relay – Men (9th), 4 × 200 m Freestyle Relay – Men (9th)

== World championships ==
- Silver Medal – 200m freestyle at the 1993 World Short-Course Championships Palma, Majorca, Spain. This was a New Zealand and Commonwealth record. World ranking: 2
- Gold Medal – 4 × 100 m medley relay at the 1995 World Short-Course Championships, Rio de Janeiro, Brazil. Bray's time of 48.55 seconds was a New Zealand record time and the relay total time was an NZ record and the 4th fastest time ever recorded at that date.
- Silver Medal – 200m Freestyle at the 1997 World Short-Course Championships, Gothenburg, Sweden. World ranking: 3

== Commonwealth Games ==
- Silver medal in the 200m Freestyle at the 1994 Commonwealth Games in Victoria, Canada
- Silver medal in the Men's 4x200 Freestyle Relay Team 1994 Commonwealth Games in Victoria, Canada
- Silver medal in the Men's 4x100 Freestyle Relay Team 1994 Commonwealth Games in Victoria, Canada
- Bronze with the Men's 4x200 Freestyle Relay Team 1998 in Kuala Lumpur, Malaysia

== See also ==
- List of Commonwealth Games medallists in swimming (men)
