= Gustavo Bucaro =

Guatemalan swimmer (born 1974)

Personal information
- Born: August 26, 1974 (age 51)

Sport
- Sport: Swimming

Gustavo Bucaro (born 26 August 1974) is a Guatemalan former swimmer who competed in the 1992 Summer Olympics.
