= Helder Torres =

Guatemalan swimmer (1975–2015)

Personal information
- Born: June 29, 1975
- Died: 16 September 2015 (aged 40)

Sport
- Sport: Swimming

Helder Torres (29 June 1975 – 16 September 2015) was a Guatemalan swimmer who competed in the 1992 Summer Olympics.
