= Doug Gjertsen =

American swimmer (born 1967)

Personal information
- Full name: Douglas Seneca Gjertsen
- Nickname: "Doug"
- National team: United States
- Born: July 31, 1967 (age 59) Phillipsburg, New Jersey, U.S.
- Height: 6 ft 5 in (1.96 m)
- Weight: 185 lb (84 kg)

Sport
- Sport: Swimming
- Strokes: Freestyle
- College team: University of Texas at Austin
Medal record
Men's swimming
Representing the United States
Olympic Games
Gold medal – first place	1988 Seoul	4 × 100 m freestyle
Gold medal – first place	1988 Seoul	4 × 200 m freestyle
Bronze medal – third place	1992 Barcelona	4 × 200 m freestyle
World Championships (LC)
Gold medal – first place	1991 Perth	4 × 100 m freestyle
Silver medal – second place	1991 Perth	4 × 200 m freestyle
Pan Pacific Games
Gold medal – first place	1989 Tokyo	200 m freestyle
Gold medal – first place	1989 Tokyo	4 × 100 m freestyle
Gold medal – first place	1989 Tokyo	4 × 200 m freestyle
Bronze medal – third place	1989 Tokyo	100 m freestyle

Douglas Seneca Gjertsen (born July 31, 1967) is an American former competition swimmer, Olympic champion, and former world record-holder.

Gjertsen was the third member of the record-setting U.S. team in the men's 4×200-meter freestyle relay at the 1988 Summer Olympics in Seoul, South Korea. The American team of Troy Dalbey, Matt Cetlinski, Gjertsen and Matt Biondi set a new world record with a time of 7:12.51. He also received a bronze medal for swimming for the third-place U.S. team in the preliminary heats of the men's 4×100-meter freestyle relay.

Four years later at the 1992 Summer Olympics in Barcelona, Spain, he was the fourth member of the third-place U.S. team in the men's 4×200-meter freestyle relay; the American team of Joe Hudepohl, Mel Stewart, Jon Olsen and Gjertsen won the bronze medal with a time of 7:16.23. Individually, he finished eighth in the final of the men's 200-meter freestyle, recording a time of 1:50.57.

He attended the University of Texas at Austin, and swam for coach Eddie Reese's Texas Longhorns swimming and diving team. He was a three-time individual NCAA champion and a nine-time relay NCAA champion. He was inducted into the Longhorn Hall of Honor in September 2006.

Gjertsen is formerly the head coach of SwimAtlanta and is currently the head coach for Alamo Area Aquatics Association in San Antonio, Texas. He has served as the personal coach for one of the best Latvian swimmers, Andrejs Dūda. He currently serves as the personal coach for former American record holder Amanda Weir.

Gjertsen has been instrumental in the orchestration of the Atlanta Swim Across America event which he helped kickstart in 2015. Since 2015, the Atlanta event has raised over $3 million for cancer research, treatment, and development.

== See also ==
- List of Olympic medalists in swimming (men)
- List of University of Texas at Austin alumni
- List of World Aquatics Championships medalists in swimming (men)
- World record progression 4 × 200 metres freestyle relay
