= Jarl Inge Melberg =

Norwegian swimmer (born 1970)

Personal information
- Born: 22 February 1970 (age 56) Sarpsborg, Norway

Sport
- Sport: Swimming
- Club: Halden SK; IL Varg

Jarl Inge Melberg (born 22 February 1970) is a retired freestyle Norwegian swimmer.

== Life and career ==
Melberg was born in Sarpsborg, on 22 February 1970.

He competed at the 1992 Summer Olympics in Barcelona but did not medal. He won a total of 42 gold medals at the Norwegian championships. He won the Kongepokal trophy twice.
