= Dmitry Lepikov =

Russian swimmer (born 1972)

Personal information
- Born: 21 April 1972 (age 54) Leningrad, Soviet Union

Sport
- Sport: Swimming
- Club: Profsoyuzy Sankt-Peterburg
Medal record
Representing the Unified Team
Olympic Games
Gold medal – first place	1992 Barcelona	4×200 m freestyle
European Championships (LC)
Representing Soviet Union
Gold medal – first place	1991 Athens	4×200 m freestyle
Representing Russia
Gold medal – first place	1993 Sheffield	4×200 m freestyle

Dmitry Mikhaylovich Lepikov (Russian: Дмитрий Михайлович Лепиков; born 21 April 1972) is a retired Russian freestyle swimmer.

He had his best achievements in the 4 × 200 m freestyle relay. In this event he won a gold medal at the 1992 Summer Olympics, setting a new world record, and two European gold medals in 1991 and 1993.
