= Turlough O'Hare =

Canadian swimmer

Personal information
- Full name: Turlough O'Hare
- National team: Canada
- Born: July 16, 1969 (age 56) Victoria, British Columbia, Canada
- Height: 1.87 m (6 ft 2 in)
- Weight: 82 kg (181 lb)

Sport
- Sport: Swimming
- Strokes: Freestyle
- Club: Pacific Dolphins
- College team: University of British Columbia
Medal record
Men's swimming
Representing Canada
Pan Pacific Games
Gold medal – first place	1989 Tokyo	400 m freestyle
Bronze medal – third place	1989 Tokyo	200 m freestyle
Bronze medal – third place	1991 Edmonton	4x200 m freestyle
Commonwealth Games
Silver medal – second place	1990 Auckland	4x200 m freestyle
Summer Universiade
Gold medal – first place	1993 Buffalo	400 m freestyle
Gold medal – first place	1993 Buffalo	800 m freestyle
Bronze medal – third place	1991 Sheffield	200 m freestyle
Bronze medal – third place	1993 Buffalo	200 m freestyle

Turlough O'Hare (born July 16, 1969) is a former international freestyle swimmer who competed in two Summer Olympics for Canada: in 1988 in Seoul and 1992 in Barcelona. His best Olympic result was eighth place with the men's 4×200-metre freestyle relay team in 1988. His international highlights included winning the Distance Freestyle World Cup series 1989 and placing 7th at the 1990 World Aquatic Championships in the 200-metre freestyle. He is a 37-time national champion and set eight Canadian and two Commonwealth records.

At the 1991 Summer Universiade, O'Hare won a bronze medal in the 200-metre freestyle. At the 1993 Summer Universiade, O'Hare won two gold medals in the 400 and 800-metre freestyle, and a bronze medal in the 200-metre freestyle

== See also ==
- List of Commonwealth Games medallists in swimming (men)
