= Yevgeny Sadovy =

Russian swimmer (born 1973)

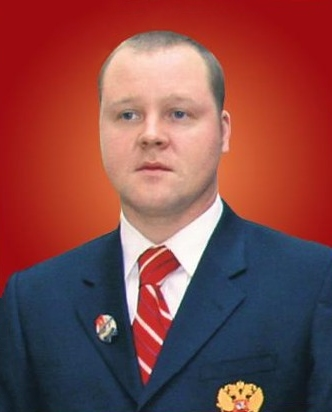

Personal information
- Born: 19 January 1973 (age 53) Volzhsky, Volgograd Oblast, Soviet Union
- Height: 1.87 m (6 ft 2 in)
- Weight: 83 kg (183 lb)

Sport
- Sport: Swimming
- Club: Volga Volgograd
- Coached by: Viktor Avdienko
Medal record
Representing the Unified Team
Olympic Games
| Gold medal – first place | 1992 Barcelona | 200 m freestyle |
| Gold medal – first place | 1992 Barcelona | 400 m freestyle |
| Gold medal – first place | 1992 Barcelona | 4×200 m freestyle |
Representing the Soviet Union
European Championships (LC)
| Gold medal – first place | 1991 Athens | 400 m freestyle |
| Gold medal – first place | 1991 Athens | 4×200 m freestyle |
Representing Russia
| Gold medal – first place | 1993 Sheffield | 4×100 m freestyle |
| Gold medal – first place | 1993 Sheffield | 4×200 m freestyle |
| Silver medal – second place | 1993 Sheffield | 200 m freestyle |

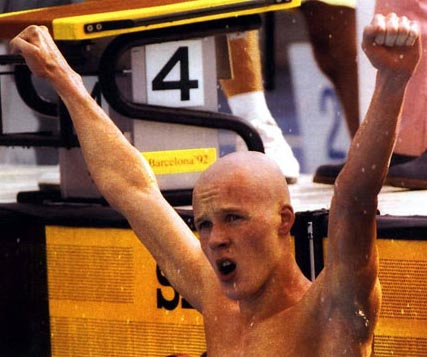
Yevgeny Sadovy at the 1992 Summer Olympics

Yevgeny Viktorovich Sadovy (Russian: Евгений Викторович Садовый; born 19 January 1973) is a retired Russian freestyle swimmer who won three gold medals at the 1992 Summer Olympics at Barcelona and was subsequently chosen by Swimming World magazine as the Male World Swimmer of the Year.

== Career ==
Born in Volzhsky, Volgograd Oblast, Sadovy started swimming at the age of six. In 1981, his family moved to Volgograd, and two years later, young Yevgeny started to train for the international competitions.

In 1991, at the European Championship in Athens, Yevgeny Sadovy was a gold medallist in the 400 m and 4×200 m relay, both freestyle.

In 1992 at Barcelona, the 19-year-old Sadovy revealed as the strongest swimmer of the Olympic games, winning three gold medals and setting two world records in the 400 m freestyle and 4×200 m freestyle relay for his team. He missed the Giorgio Lamberti's world record in the 200 m freestyle race by a 0.01 second, but cut 1.47 seconds off Kieren Perkins' record in the 400 m, beating the same Australian swimmer.

In 1993, Sadovy was second in the 200 m freestyle at the European Championship in Sheffield, plus two other golds in freestyle relays. He retired in September 1996 to work as a swimming coach, first in his native Volgograd, then in Moscow, with the national team, and later in Libya. His trainees include Sergey Ostapchuk and Yekaterina Kibalo.

In 1996, Sadovy graduated from an Olympic school and later from the State Institute of Sport, both in Volgograd.

== Personal bests ==
In long-course swimming pools Sadovy's personal bests are:

- 200 m freestyle: 1:46.70
- 400 m freestyle: 3:45.00

== See also ==
- List of members of the International Swimming Hall of Fame
- List of multiple Olympic gold medalists at a single Games
- World record progression 400 metres freestyle

Records
| Preceded by Kieren Perkins | Men's 400 metres freestyle world record holder (long course); 29 July 1992 – 11 September 1994 | Succeeded by Kieren Perkins |
Awards
| Preceded by Tamás Darnyi | World Swimmer of the Year; 1992 | Succeeded by Károly Güttler |
| Preceded by Tamás Darnyi | European Swimmer of the Year; 1992 | Succeeded by Károly Güttler |
