= Darren Ward (swimmer) =

Canadian swimmer

Personal information
- Full name: Darren Thomas Ward
- National team: Canada
- Born: December 2, 1968 (age 57) Duluth, Minnesota
- Height: 1.87 m (6 ft 2 in)
- Weight: 112 kg (247 lb)

Sport
- Sport: Swimming
- Strokes: Freestyle, medley
- College team: University of Calgary
Medal record
Men's swimming
Representing Canada
Pan Pacific Championships
Bronze medal – third place	1991 Edmonton	200m freestyle
Bronze medal – third place	1991 Edmonton	4x100m freestyle
Bronze medal – third place	1991 Edmonton	4x200m freestyle
Commonwealth Games
Bronze medal – third place	1990 Auckland	4×100 m freestyle
Pan American Games
Silver medal – second place	1987 Indianapolis	4x100 m freestyle
Silver medal – second place	1987 Indianapolis	4x200 m freestyle
Silver medal – second place	1987 Indianapolis	4x100 m medley

Darren Thomas Ward (born December 2, 1968) is a former international Freestyle swimmer who was born in the United States and attended Sonora High School in La Habra California, but competed for Canada at the 1988 Summer Olympics in Seoul, South Korea and 1992 Summer Olympics in Barcelona, Spain. Out of High School, Darren accepted a full swimming scholarship to UCLA, where he won the PAC-10 championship in the 200 IM, in his Freshman Year. While at UCLA, Darren qualified for the 1988 Canadian Olympic Swim team and competed in Seoul, South Korea. Darren decided to further pursue his international swimming career and moved to Calgary, Alberta, where he went on to win 10 Canadian National Championship titles, 4 US Open titles and 1 Commonwealth Games Bronze medal. He was a World Championships finalist in 1991 in Perth, Australia and competed in 4 Pan Pacific Swimming Championships between 1989-1995. In 1992, he competed for Canada at a second Olympic Games, in Barcelona, Spain. Darren's international career highlight also came in 1992, winning the Swimming World Cup title in the Individual Medley category and ranking number 1 in the World in short course 200 and 400 IM. He established new Canadian records in the 100 and 200 IM, narrowly missing the World record by less than 2/10ths of a second. After retiring from competitive Swimming in 1995, Darren embarked on a successful Coaching career, and is now enjoying his 30th season as a competitive Swim Coach, currently coaching at Canada's top Age Group Club in the Toronto suburb of Etobicoke, Ontario. Darren is married to wife Michelle Bindon-Ward and currently resides in Mississauga, Ontario.

== See also ==
- List of Commonwealth Games medallists in swimming (men)
