= Vladimir Pyshnenko =

Russian swimmer (born 1970)

Personal information
- Full name: Владимир Васильевич Пышненко
- Nationality: Russia
- Born: 25 March 1970 (age 56) Rostov-on-Don, Russian SFSR, Soviet Union
- Height: 1.94 m (6 ft 4 in)
- Weight: 89 kg (196 lb)

Sport
- Sport: Swimming
- Strokes: Freestyle
- Club: CSKA, Rostov-on-Don
Medal record
Men's swimming
Representing the Unified Team
Olympic Games
Gold medal – first place	1992 Barcelona	4×200 m freestyle
Silver medal – second place	1992 Barcelona	4×100 m freestyle
Silver medal – second place	1992 Barcelona	4×100 m medley
Representing Russia
Silver medal – second place	1996 Atlanta	4×100 m freestyle
World Championships (LC)
Representing Russia
Silver medal – second place	1994 Rome	4×100 m freestyle
Silver medal – second place	1994 Rome	4×200 m freestyle
European Championships (LC)
Representing the Soviet Union
Gold medal – first place	1991 Athens	4×200 m freestyle
Representing Russia
Gold medal – first place	1993 Sheffield	4×100 m freestyle
Gold medal – first place	1993 Sheffield	4×200 m freestyle
Gold medal – first place	1997 Athens	4×100 m freestyle

Vladimir Vasilevich Pyshnenko (Russian: Владимир Васильевич Пышненко; born 25 March 1970) is a Russian former freestyle swimmer who won one gold medal and two silver medals at the 1992 Summer Olympics at Barcelona and one silver medal at the 1996 Summer Olympics at Atlanta. He also won two silver medals at the 1994 World Aquatics Championships in Rome and one gold medal at the European LC Championships 1991.

== Career ==
=== Olympics ===
Vladimir Pyshnenko qualified for both the 1992 Summer Olympics in Barcelona, and the 1996 Summer Olympics in Atlanta. He represented the Unified Team in the 1992 Olympics due to the recent dissolution of the Soviet Union. In the 1992 games, he won a gold medal and set a world record for the 4×200 m freestyle relay, a silver medal for the 4×100 m freestyle relay, and another silver medal for the 4×100 m medley relay. In the 1996 games, he represented newly-formed Russia, and won a silver medal for the 4×100 m freestyle relay.

=== Masters swimming ===
After a successful professional swimming career, Vlad Pyshnenko continues to swim through the U.S. Masters Swimming program. Currently, Pyshnenko holds 3 World records and a couple of American records in masters program: For men 35-39 he holds the 100 yards freestyle American record of 44.24 seconds short course yards (SCY), and the 200 meters freestyle World Record of 1:52.84 long course meters (LCM). For men 40-44 he holds the 100 meters freestyle World record of 51.72 seconds (LCM), and the 200 meter freestyle World record of 1:53.65 (LCM).

=== Coaching ===
Since arriving in the U.S., Pyshnenko has coached at COHO Swim Club, Glenbrook Aquatics (formerly Northbrook Spartan Swim Club) in Northbrook, Illinois, Deerfield High School in Deerfield, Illinois, and at RISE Aquatic Team. He is currently the Head Senior Coach for the RISE Aquatic Team in Libertyville, Illinois.

== Personal life ==
Pyshnenko has one daughter, Daria Pyshnenko (b. 1999). Pyshnenko resides in Mundelein, Illinois.
