= Swimming at the 1998 World Aquatics Championships – Men's 200 metre butterfly =

Men's 200 metre butterfly at the 1998 FINA World Championships
- Date: 14 January 1998
- Competitors: 36
- Winning time: 1 minute 56.61 seconds

Medalists
gold medal	Denys Sylantyev	Ukraine
silver medal	Franck Esposito	France
bronze medal	Tom Malchow	United States

The finals and the qualifying heats of the men's 200 metre butterfly event at the 1998 World Aquatics Championships were held on Wednesday 1998-01-14 in Perth, Western Australia.

== A Final ==
Rank	Name	Time
Gold medal	Denys Sylantyev (UKR)	1:56.61
Silver medal	Franck Esposito (FRA)	1:56.77
Bronze medal	Tom Malchow (USA)	1:57.26
4	Takashi Yamamoto (JPN)	1:57.50
5	James Hickman (GBR)	1:58.76
6	Stephen Parry (GBR)	1:59.57
7	Han Kyu-Chul (KOR)	2:00.26
—	Scott Goodman (AUS)	DSQ

== B Final ==
Rank	Name	Time
9	Uğur Taner (USA)	1:59.13
10	Stefan Aartsen (NED)	1:59.98
11	Anatoly Polyakov (RUS)	1:59.98
12	Vesa Hanski (FIN)	2:00.30
13	Chris-Carol Bremer (GER)	2:00.37
14	Péter Horváth (HUN)	2:00.73
15	Massimiliano Eroli (ITA)	2:00.79
16	Xie Xufeng (CHN)	2:03.24

== Qualifying heats ==
Rank	Name	Time
1	Franck Esposito (FRA)	1:56.32
2	Takashi Yamamoto (JPN)	1:56.99
3	Denys Sylantyev (UKR)	1:57.62
4	Tom Malchow (USA)	1:58.20
5	Scott Goodman (AUS)	1:58.87
6	James Hickman (GBR)	1:59.13
7	Han Kyu-Chul (KOR)	1:59.14
8	Stephen Parry (GBR)	1:59.37
9	Uğur Taner (USA)	1:59.63
10	Chris-Carol Bremer (GER)	1:59.85
11	Stefan Aartsen (NED)	1:59.89
12	Péter Horváth (HUN)	1:59.91
13	Vesa Hanski (FIN)	2:00.23
14	Anatoly Polyakov (RUS)	2:00.45
15	Massimiliano Eroli (ITA)	2:00.85
16	Xie Xufeng (CHN)	2:01.24
17	Zane King (AUS)	2:01.50
18	Pedro Monteiro (BRA)	2:01.61
19	Jorge Pérez (ESP)	2:01.62
20	Tero Välimaa (FIN)	2:01.64
21	Alex Gorguraki (RUS)	2:01.75
22	Aleksandar Malenko (MKD)	2:02.18
23	Vladan Marković (YUG)	2:02.30
24	Marcin Kaczmarek (POL)	2:02.40
25	Thomas Rupprath (GER)	2:02.60
26	Colin Lowth (IRL)	2:03.25
27	Theo Verster (RSA)	2:03.32
28	Konstantin Andrushin (KAZ)	2:03.46
29	Adrian Andermatt (SUI)	2:03.76
30	Kim Bang-Hyun (KOR)	2:03.90
31	Georgios Popotas (GRE)	2:04.17
32	Mark Kwok (HKG)	2:04.42
33	Huang Xin (CHN)	2:04.67
34	Aleksandar Miladinovski (MKD)	2:04.83
35	Alexis Perdomo (VEN)	2:04.90
36	Simão Morgado (POR)	2:05.82

== See also ==
- 1996 Men's Olympic Games 200m Butterfly (Atlanta)
- 1997 Men's World SC Championships 200m Butterfly (Gothenburg)
- 1997 Men's European LC Championships 200m Butterfly (Seville)
- 2000 Men's Olympic Games 200m Butterfly (Sydney)
