= Swimming at the 1998 World Aquatics Championships – Men's 100 metre butterfly =

Men's 100 metre butterfly at the 1998 FINA World Championships
- Date: 16 January 1998
- Competitors: 39
- Winning time: 52.25 seconds

Medalists
gold medal	Michael Klim	Australia
silver medal	Lars Frölander	Sweden
bronze medal	Geoff Huegill	Australia

The finals and the qualifying heats of the men's 100 metre butterfly event at the 1998 World Aquatics Championships were held on Friday 1998-01-16 in Perth, Western Australia.

== A Final ==
Rank	Name	Time
Gold medal	Michael Klim (AUS)	52.25 CR
Silver medal	Lars Frölander (SWE)	52.79
Bronze medal	Geoff Huegill (AUS)	52.90
4	Franck Esposito (FRA)	52.94
5	Joris Keizer (NED)	53.37
6	Takashi Yamamoto (JPN)	53.53
7	Denys Sylantyev (UKR)	53.59
8	Péter Horváth (HUN)	53.60

== B Final ==
Rank	Name	Time
9	James Hickman (GBR)	53.85
10	Stefan Aartsen (NED)	53.95
11	Neil Walker (USA)	54.05
12	John Hargis (USA)	54.33
13	Theo Verster (RSA)	54.38
14	Francisco Sánchez (VEN)	54.63
15	Tero Välimaa (FIN)	54.80
16	Thomas Rupprath (GER)	54.95

== Qualifying heats ==
Rank	Name	Time
1	Geoff Huegill (AUS)	52.93 CR
2	Franck Esposito (FRA)	53.19
3	Lars Frölander (SWE)	53.30
4	Michael Klim (AUS)	53.34
5	Denys Sylantyev (UKR)	53.48
6	Joris Keizer (NED)	53.73
7	Takashi Yamamoto (JPN)	53.76
8	Péter Horváth (HUN)	53.84
9	Neil Walker (USA)	54.01
10	John Hargis (USA)	54.12
11	Stefan Aartsen (NED)	54.14
12	James Hickman (GBR)	54.34
13	Ricardo Busquets (PUR)	54.47
14	Tero Välimaa (FIN)	54.50
15	Thomas Rupprath (GER)	54.60
16	Vladislav Kulikov (RUS)	54.70
17	Theo Verster (RSA)	54.76
18	Francisco Sánchez (VEN)	54.82
19	Stephen Clarke (CAN)	54.98
20	Marcin Kaczmarek (POL)	55.00
21	Jesús González (MEX)	55.04
22	Anatoly Polyakov (RUS)	55.07
23	Vesa Hanski (FIN)	55.24
24	Stephen Parry (GBR)	55.35
25	Jonathan Winter (NZL)	55.51
26	Peter Mankoč (SLO)	55.53
27	Han Kyu-Chul (KOR)	55.73
27	Derya Büyükuncu (TUR)	55.73
29	Alexis Perdomo (VEN)	55.75
29	Jens Kruppa (GER)	55.75
31	Huang Xin (CHN)	55.78
32	Aleksandar Malenko (MKD)	55.90
33	Janko Gojković (BIH)	56.02
34	Vladan Marković (YUG)	56.09
35	Johan García (CUB)	56.12
35	Georgios Popotas (GRE)	56.12
37	Ravil Nachaev (UZB)	56.14
38	Pedro Monteiro (BRA)	56.21
39	Luc Decker (LUX)	56.22

Note: This is not a complete list of results. The SwimNews source below lists 70 swimmers entered in the event. One of the non-list swimmers is very likely Kamal Salman Masud who set a Pakistan Record of 58.19.

== See also ==
- 1996 Men's Olympic Games 100m Butterfly (Atlanta)
- 1997 Men's World SC Championships 100m Butterfly (Gothenburg)
- 1997 Men's European LC Championships 100m Butterfly (Seville)
- 2000 Men's Olympic Games 100m Butterfly (Sydney)
