= Swimming at the 1997 European Aquatics Championships – Men's 100 metre butterfly =

The final of the Men's 100 metres Butterfly event at the European LC Championships 1997 was held on Wednesday 20 August 1997 in Seville, Spain.

== Finals ==
RANK	FINAL A	TIME
	Lars Frölander (SWE)	52.85
	Denys Sylantyev (UKR)	53.27
	Franck Esposito (FRA)	53.28
4.	Vladislav Kulikov (RUS)	54.84
5.	Thomas Rupprath (GER)	53.99
6.	Denis Pankratov (RUS)	54.00
7.	Marcin Kaczmarek (POL)	54.49
8.	Péter Horváth (HUN)	54.51

RANK	FINAL B	TIME
9.	Stefan Aartsen (NED)	54.12
10.	Vesa Hanski (FIN)	54.33
11.	Eran Groumi (ISR)	54.48
12.	Stephen Parry (GBR)	54.60
13.	Vladan Marković (YUG)	55.00
14.	James Hickman (GBR)	55.04
15.	Zsolt Gáspár (HUN)	55.08
16.	Tero Välimaa (FIN)	55.33

== Qualifying heats ==
RANK	HEATS RANKING	TIME
1.	Lars Frölander (SWE)	53.14
2.	Franck Esposito (FRA)	53.45
3.	Denys Sylantyev (UKR)	53.57
4.	Thomas Rupprath (GER)	54.00
5.	Vladislav Kulikov (RUS)	54.19
6.	Denis Pankratov (RUS)	54.30
7.	Péter Horváth (HUN)	54.38
8.	Marcin Kaczmarek (POL)	54.39
9.	Christian Keller (GER)	54.41
10.	Vesa Hanski (FIN)	54.43
11.	Stefan Aartsen (NED)	54.66
12.	Eran Groumi (ISR)	54.91
13.	Stephen Parry (GBR)	54.98
14.	James Hickman (GBR)	55.03
15.	Tero Välimaa (FIN)	55.19
16.	Zsolt Gáspár (HUN)	55.20
17.	Vladan Marković (YUG)	55.27
18.	Oleg Rykhlevich (BLR)	55.28
19.	Peter Mankoč (SLO)	55.49
20.	Artur Kolecki (POL)	55.66
21.	Valter Magnusson (SWE)	55.70
22.	Georgios Popotas (GRE)	56.17
23.	Juan Fernández (ESP)	56.27
24.	Denislav Kalchev (BUL)	56.39
25.	Jakob Andersen (DEN)	56.51
25.	Yoav Meiri (ISR)	56.51
27.	Aleksandar Miladinovski (MKD)	56.59
28.	Vermund Vetnes (NOR)	56.72
29.	Artion Zaicev (LTU)	56.80
30.	Luc Decker (LUX)	57.01
31.	Miguel Cabrita (POR)	57.09
32.	Mindaugas Bruzas (LTU)	57.38
33.	Paul MacCarthy (IRL)	57.43
34.	Ivo Benda (CZE)	57.73
35.	Colin Lowth (IRL)	58.86

== See also ==
- 1996 Men's Olympic Games 100m Butterfly
- 1997 Men's World Championships (SC) 100m Butterfly
