= Swimming at the 1997 European Aquatics Championships – Men's 200 metre butterfly =

The final of the Men's 200 metres Butterfly event at the European LC Championships 1997 was held on Saturday 23 August 1997 in Seville, Spain.

== Finals ==
| RANK | FINAL A | TIME |
|---|---|---|
| | Franck Esposito (FRA) | 1:57.24 |
| | Denys Sylantyev (UKR) | 1:58.48 |
| | Stephen Parry (GBR) | 1:58.78 |
| 4. | Chris-Carol Bremer (GER) | 1:58.86 |
| 5. | Vesa Hanski (FIN) | 1:59.32 |
| 6. | Massimiliano Eroli (ITA) | 1:59.81 |
| 7. | Alexandre Gorguraki (RUS) | 2:00.18 |
| 8. | Marcin Kaczmarek (POL) | 2:00.73 |

| RANK | FINAL B | TIME |
|---|---|---|
| 9. | Stefan Aartsen (NED) | 1:58.43 |
| 10. | Jorge Pérez (ESP) | 2:01.37 |
| 11. | Vladan Marković (YUG) | 2:01.43 |
| 12. | Michael Halika (ISR) | 2:02.67 |
| 13. | Adrian Andermatt (SUI) | 2:02.82 |
| 14. | Yoav Meiri (ISR) | 2:03.32 |
| 15. | Krzysztof Golon (POL) | 2:03.46 |
| 16. | Chester Marsman (NED) | 2:03.88 |

== Qualifying heats ==
| RANK | HEATS RANKING | TIME |
|---|---|---|
| 1. | Franck Esposito (FRA) | 1:58.58 |
| 2. | Denys Sylantyev (UKR) | 1:59.06 |
| 3. | Chris-Carol Bremer (GER) | 1:59.88 |
| 4. | Vesa Hanski (FIN) | 2:00.46 |
| 5. | Stephen Parry (GBR) | 2:00.56 |
| 6. | Alexandre Gorguraki (RUS) | 2:00.71 |
| 7. | Marcin Kaczmarek (POL) | 2:00.90 |
| 8. | Massimiliano Eroli (ITA) | 2:00.93 |
| 9. | Jorge Pérez (ESP) | 2:01.08 |
| 10. | Stefan Aartsen (NED) | 2:01.17 |
| 11. | Denis Pankratov (RUS) | 2:01.25 |
| 12. | Vladan Marković (YUG) | 2:01.37 |
| 13. | Chester Marsman (NED) | 2:01.98 |
| 14. | Yoav Meiri (ISR) | 2:02.91 |
| 15. | Adrian Andermatt (SUI) | 2:03.24 |
| 16. | Krzysztof Golon (POL) | 2:03.56 |
| 17. | Michael Halika (ISR) | 2:03.65 |
| 18. | Oliver Lampe (GER) | 2:03.94 |
| 19. | Colin Lowth (IRL) | 2:03.96 |
| 20. | Georgios Popotas (GRE) | 2:03.98 |
| 21. | Aleksandar Miladinovski (MKD) | 2:04.16 |
| 22. | Tero Velimaa (FIN) | 2:05.75 |
| 23. | Mindaugas Bruzas (LTU) | 2:05.94 |
| 24. | Paul MacCarthy (IRL) | 2:06.43 |
| 25. | Artion Zaicev (LTU) | 2:08.06 |
| 26. | Luc Decker (LUX) | 2:11.59 |

== See also ==
- 1996 Men's Olympic Games 200m Butterfly
- 1997 Men's World Championships (SC) 200m Butterfly
