= Swimming at the 1996 Summer Olympics – Men's 200 metre butterfly =

Men's 200 metre butterfly at the Games of the XXVI Olympiad
- Venue: Georgia Tech Aquatic Center
- Date: 22 July 1996 (heats & finals)
- Competitors: 43 from 37 nations
- Winning time: 1:56.51

Medalists
| 1st place, gold medalist(s) | | Denis Pankratov | Russia |
| 2nd place, silver medalist(s) | | Tom Malchow | United States |
| 3rd place, bronze medalist(s) | | Scott Goodman | Australia |

The men's 200 metre butterfly event at the 1996 Summer Olympics took place on 22 July at the Georgia Tech Aquatic Center in Atlanta, United States.

== Records ==
Prior to this competition, the existing world and Olympic records were as follows.

| World record | Denis Pankratov (RUS) | 1:55.22 | Canet-en-Roussillon, France | 14 June 1995 |
| Olympic record | Melvin Stewart (USA) | 1:56.26 | Barcelona, Spain | 30 July 1992 |

== Results ==
=== Heats ===
Rule: The eight fastest swimmers advance to final A (Q), while the next eight to final B (q).

| Rank | Heat | Lane | Name | Nationality | Time | Notes |
|---|---|---|---|---|---|---|
| 1 | 5 | 4 | Scott Goodman | Australia | 1:57.77 | Q |
| 2 | 4 | 7 | Denys Sylantyev | Ukraine | 1:58.04 | Q, NR |
| 3 | 6 | 3 | James Hickman | Great Britain | 1:58.16 | Q, NR |
| 4 | 6 | 4 | Denis Pankratov | Russia | 1:58.28 | Q |
| 5 | 4 | 4 | Tom Malchow | United States | 1:58.69 | Q |
| 6 | 4 | 1 | Péter Horváth | Hungary | 1:58.76 | Q |
| 7 | 4 | 5 | Franck Esposito | France | 1:58.79 | Q |
| 8 | 5 | 5 | Scott Miller | Australia | 1:58.97 | Q |
| 9 | 6 | 1 | Vesa Hanski | Finland | 1:59.73 | q, NR |
| 10 | 6 | 7 | Oliver Lampe | Germany | 1:59.87 | q |
| 11 | 6 | 2 | Konrad Gałka | Poland | 1:59.97 | q |
| 12 | 5 | 1 | Stefan Aartsen | Netherlands | 2:00.04 | q |
| 13 | 4 | 2 | Casey Barrett | Canada | 2:00.28 | q |
| 14 | 5 | 3 | Chris-Carol Bremer | Germany | 2:00.48 | q |
| 15 | 5 | 6 | Attila Czene | Hungary | 2:00.50 | q |
| 16 | 4 | 3 | David Abrard | France | 2:00.60 | q |
| 17 | 5 | 7 | Andrea Oriana | Italy | 2:00.67 | |
| 18 | 5 | 2 | Aleksey Kolesnikov | Russia | 2:00.77 | |
| 19 | 6 | 6 | Danyon Loader | New Zealand | 2:00.81 | |
| 20 | 4 | 6 | Takashi Yamamoto | Japan | 2:00.87 | |
| 21 | 6 | 5 | Ray Carey | United States | 2:01.10 | |
| 22 | 3 | 3 | Dominik Galić | Croatia | 2:01.17 | NR |
| 23 | 3 | 1 | Aleksandar Malenko | Macedonia | 2:01.46 | NR |
| 24 | 5 | 8 | Nelson Mora | Venezuela | 2:01.50 | |
| 25 | 3 | 4 | Diogo Madeira | Portugal | 2:01.58 | |
| 26 | 3 | 7 | Konstantin Andriushin | Kyrgyzstan | 2:01.59 | NR |
| 27 | 4 | 8 | Can Ergenekan | Turkey | 2:01.65 | |
| 28 | 3 | 6 | Vladan Marković | FR Yugoslavia | 2:01.80 | |
| 29 | 3 | 5 | José Luis Ballester | Spain | 2:02.69 | |
| 30 | 3 | 8 | Josef Horký | Czech Republic | 2:02.84 | |
| 31 | 2 | 2 | Anthony Ang | Malaysia | 2:03.01 | NR |
| 32 | 2 | 6 | Mindaugas Bružas | Lithuania | 2:03.76 | |
| 33 | 2 | 1 | Niti Intharapichai | Thailand | 2:03.88 | NR |
| 34 | 1 | 4 | Mark Kwok Kin Ming | Hong Kong | 2:04.01 | |
| 35 | 2 | 4 | Lee Jung-hyung | South Korea | 2:04.53 | |
| 36 | 1 | 5 | Walter Soza | Nicaragua | 2:04.66 | |
| 37 | 2 | 7 | Javier Golovchenko | Uruguay | 2:04.96 | |
| 38 | 2 | 3 | Dmitriy Pankov | Uzbekistan | 2:05.36 | |
| 39 | 2 | 8 | Andrés Vasconcellos | Ecuador | 2:05.98 | |
| 40 | 3 | 2 | Georgios Popotas | Greece | 2:06.00 | |
| 41 | 6 | 8 | Thum Ping Tjin | Singapore | 2:07.00 | |
| 42 | 1 | 3 | Aitor Osorio | Andorra | 2:12.59 | |
| | 2 | 5 | Jesús González | Mexico | DNS | |

=== Finals ===
==== Final B ====
| Rank | Lane | Name | Nationality | Time | Notes |
|---|---|---|---|---|---|
| 9 | 1 | Attila Czene | Hungary | 1:58.99 | |
| 10 | 4 | Vesa Hanski | Finland | 1:59.64 | NR |
| 11 | 2 | Casey Barrett | Canada | 1:59.72 | |
| 12 | 5 | Oliver Lampe | Germany | 2:00.08 | |
| 13 | 6 | Stefan Aartsen | Netherlands | 2:00.41 | |
| 14 | 3 | Konrad Gałka | Poland | 2:00.91 | |
| 15 | 8 | David Abrard | France | 2:01.25 | |
| 16 | 7 | Chris-Carol Bremer | Germany | 2:01.62 | |

==== Final A ====
| Rank | Lane | Name | Nationality | Time | Notes |
|---|---|---|---|---|---|
| 1st place, gold medalist(s) | 6 | Denis Pankratov | Russia | 1:56.51 | |
| 2nd place, silver medalist(s) | 2 | Tom Malchow | United States | 1:57.44 | |
| 3rd place, bronze medalist(s) | 4 | Scott Goodman | Australia | 1:57.48 | |
| 4 | 1 | Franck Esposito | France | 1:58.10 | NR |
| 5 | 8 | Scott Miller | Australia | 1:58.28 | |
| 6 | 5 | Denys Sylantyev | Ukraine | 1:58.37 | |
| 7 | 3 | James Hickman | Great Britain | 1:58.47 | |
| 8 | 7 | Péter Horváth | Hungary | 1:59.12 | |
