= Swimming at the 1996 Summer Olympics – Men's 100 metre butterfly =

Men's 100 metre butterfly at the Games of the XXVI Olympiad
- Venue: Georgia Tech Aquatic Center
- Date: 24 July 1996 (heats & finals)
- Competitors: 61 from 56 nations
- Winning time: 52.27 WR

Medalists
1st place, gold medalist(s)		Denis Pankratov	Russia
2nd place, silver medalist(s)		Scott Miller	Australia
3rd place, bronze medalist(s)		Vladislav Kulikov	Russia

The men's 100 metre butterfly event at the 1996 Summer Olympics took place on 24 July at the Georgia Tech Aquatic Center in Atlanta, United States.

== Records ==
Prior to this competition, the existing world and Olympic records were as follows.

World record	Denis Pankratov (RUS)	52.32	Vienna, Austria	23 August 1995
Olympic record	Anthony Nesty (SUR)	53.00	Seoul, South Korea	21 September 1988

The following records were established during the competition:

Date	Round	Name	Nationality	Time	Record
24 July	Heat 7	Scott Miller	Australia	52.89	OR
24 July	Final A	Denis Pankratov	Russia	52.27	WR

== Results ==
=== Heats ===
Rule: The eight fastest swimmers advance to final A (Q), while the next eight to final B (q).

Rank	Heat	Lane	Name	Nationality	Time	Notes
1	7	4	Scott Miller	Australia	52.89	Q, OR
2	8	4	Denis Pankratov	Russia	52.96	Q
3	7	7	Pavlo Khnykin	Ukraine	53.25	Q, NR
4	8	2	Jiang Chengji	China	53.40	Q
5	6	2	Stephen Clarke	Canada	53.41	Q
5	8	3	Rafał Szukała	Poland	53.41	Q
7	7	5	Michael Klim	Australia	53.42	Q
8	6	4	Vladislav Kulikov	Russia	53.54	Q
9	7	3	Mark Henderson	United States	53.58	q
10	8	6	Péter Horváth	Hungary	53.69	q
11	7	6	James Hickman	Great Britain	53.73	q
12	6	3	Franck Esposito	France	53.77	q
13	4	5	Ricardo Busquets	Puerto Rico	53.90	q, NR
13	4	3	Francisco Sánchez	Venezuela	53.90	q, WD, NR
15	7	2	Takashi Yamamoto	Japan	53.95	q, NR
16	7	1	Edward Parenti	Canada	54.03	q
17	6	5	John Hargis	United States	54.06	q
18	8	5	Denys Sylantyev	Ukraine	54.33	
19	6	6	Lars Frölander	Sweden	54.37	
20	8	8	Yukihiro Matsushita	Japan	54.50	
21	5	6	Andrey Gavrilov	Kazakhstan	54.56	NR
21	6	7	Oliver Lampe	Germany	54.56	
23	5	4	Miloš Milošević	Croatia	54.62	
23	8	1	Stefan Aartsen	Netherlands	54.62	
25	5	1	Vesa Hanski	Finland	54.73	
26	7	8	Denislav Kalchev	Bulgaria	54.81	
27	4	4	Derya Büyükuncu	Turkey	54.89	
28	4	2	Vladan Marković	FR Yugoslavia	54.90	
29	5	2	Jesús González	Mexico	54.94	
30	6	1	Diego Perdomo	Colombia	55.08	
31	5	8	Dan Kutler	Israel	55.11	
32	3	4	André Teixeira	Brazil	55.23	
33	4	1	Javier Golovchenko	Uruguay	55.26	NR
34	5	7	Danyon Loader	New Zealand	55.39	
35	4	8	Răzvan Petcu	Romania	55.50	
36	5	3	Peter Mankoč	Slovenia	55.59	
37	2	3	Rubén Piñeda	El Salvador	56.01	
38	8	7	José Meolans	Argentina	56.02	
39	5	5	Andrea Oriana	Italy	56.04	
40	3	3	Giovanni Linscheer	Suriname	56.09	
41	3	6	Janko Gojković	Bosnia and Herzegovina	56.11	NR
42	1	4	Kire Filipovski	Macedonia	56.13	NR
43	4	7	Georgios Popotas	Greece	56.16	
44	3	1	Roberto Delgado	Ecuador	56.29	NR
45	3	5	Anthony Ang	Malaysia	56.41	
46	3	7	Maxim Cazmirciuc	Moldova	56.46	
46	4	6	Tamer Hamed	Egypt	56.46	
48	2	4	Ravil Nachaev	Uzbekistan	56.61	
49	2	6	Artūrs Jakovļevs	Latvia	56.62	
50	2	1	Arthur Li Kai Yien	Hong Kong	56.92	
51	3	8	Patrick Sagisi	Guam	56.93	
52	1	5	Yang Dae-chul	South Korea	57.05	
53	2	7	Thum Ping Tjin	Singapore	57.07	
54	1	3	Mindaugas Bružas	Lithuania	57.10	
55	2	2	José Isaza	Panama	57.62	
56	2	8	Alain Sergile	Haiti	58.23	
57	1	6	Kamal Salman Masud	Pakistan	58.59	
58	1	2	David Pereyra	Bolivia	1:01.63	
	2	5	Salim Iles	Algeria	DNS	
	3	2	Indrek Sei	Estonia	DNS	
	6	8	Martín López-Zubero	Spain	DNS	

=== Finals ===
==== Final B ====
Rank	Lane	Name	Nationality	Time	Notes
9	3	James Hickman	Great Britain	53.23	
9	4	Mark Henderson	United States	53.23	
11	5	Péter Horváth	Hungary	53.48	
12	2	Ricardo Busquets	Puerto Rico	53.65	NR
13	7	Takashi Yamamoto	Japan	53.98	
14	6	Franck Esposito	France	54.02	
15	1	Edward Parenti	Canada	54.19	
16	8	John Hargis	United States	54.29	

==== Final A ====
Rank	Lane	Name	Nationality	Time	Notes
1st place, gold medalist(s)	5	Denis Pankratov	Russia	52.27	WR
2nd place, silver medalist(s)	4	Scott Miller	Australia	52.53	OC
3rd place, bronze medalist(s)	8	Vladislav Kulikov	Russia	53.13	
4	6	Jiang Chengji	China	53.20	AS
5	2	Rafał Szukała	Poland	53.29	
6	1	Michael Klim	Australia	53.30	
7	7	Stephen Clarke	Canada	53.33	
8	3	Pavlo Khnykin	Ukraine	53.58	
