= 1997 FINA Short Course World Championships – Men's 200m butterfly =

The finals and the qualifying heats of the men's 200 metres butterfly event at the 1997 FINA Short Course World Championships were held on the third day of the competition, on Saturday 19 April 1997 in Gothenburg, Sweden.

== Finals ==
RANK	FINAL A	TIME
	James Hickman (GBR)	1:55.55
	Denys Sylantyev (UKR)	1:55.76
	Scott Goodman (AUS)	1:55.94
4.	Shamek Pietucha (CAN)	1:56.55
5.	Chris-Carol Bremer (GER)	1:56.94
6.	Edward Parenti (CAN)	1:57.01
7.	Thomas Rupprath (GER)	1:57.66
8.	Pedro Monteiro (BRA)	1:58.15

RANK	FINAL B	TIME
9.	Aleksandar Malenko (MKD)	1:58.37 NR
10.	Nate Dusing (USA)	1:58.50
11.	Josef Horký (CZE)	1:59.57
12.	Theo Verster (RSA)	1:59.71
13.	Michael Watkins (GBR)	2:00.38
14.	Adrian Andermatt (SUI)	2:00.46
15.	Bill Kirby (AUS)	2:00.58
16.	Mauricio Cunha (BRA)	2:02.29

== Qualifying heats ==
RANK	HEATS RANKING	TIME
1.	James Hickman (GBR)	1:55.68
2.	Shamek Pietucha (CAN)	1:56.04
3.	Denys Sylantyev (UKR)	1:56.60
4.	Scott Goodman (AUS)	1:57.04
5.	Chris-Carol Bremer (GER)	1:57.34
6.	Pedro Monteiro (BRA)	1:57.66
7.	Edward Parenti (CAN)	1:57.73
8.	Thomas Rupprath (GER)	1:57.91
9.	Denis Pankratov (RUS)	1:58.22
10.	Nate Dusing (USA)	1:58.84
11.	Fredrik Lundin (SWE)	1:59.31
12.	Adrian Andermatt (SUI)	1:59.46
13.	Aleksandar Malenko (MKD)	1:59.47
14.	Josef Horký (CZE)	1:59.62
15.	Bill Kirby (AUS)	1:59.70
16.	Theo Verster (RSA)	1:59.88
17.	Michael Watkins (GBR)	2:00.02
18.	Mauricio Cunha (BRA)	2:00.21
19.	Alexis Perdomo (VEN)	2:01.20
20.	Mark Kwok (HKG)	2:01.21
21.	Sebastien Buchheim (CRC)	2:03.14
22.	Alex Miladinovski (MKD)	2:03.17
23.	Johan Mattsson (SWE)	2:03.39
24.	Alejandro Bermúdez (COL)	2:04.05
25.	Johan García (CUB)	2:04.12
26.	Konstantin Andrushin (KGZ)	2:04.19
27.	Mindaugas Bruzas (LTU)	2:04.35

== See also ==
- 1996 Men's Olympic Games 200m Butterfly
- 1997 Men's European LC Championships 200m Butterfly
