= Swimming at the 2000 Summer Olympics – Men's 200 metre butterfly =

Men's 200 metre butterfly at the Games of the XXVII Olympiad
- Venue: Sydney International Aquatic Centre
- Date: September 18, 2000 (heats & semifinals); September 19, 2000 (final)
- Competitors: 46 from 40 nations
- Winning time: 1:55.35 OR

Medalists
1st place, gold medalist(s)		Tom Malchow	United States
2nd place, silver medalist(s)		Denys Sylantyev	Ukraine
3rd place, bronze medalist(s)		Justin Norris	Australia

The men's 200 metre butterfly event at the 2000 Summer Olympics took place on 18–19 September at the Sydney International Aquatic Centre in Sydney, Australia.

U.S. swimmer Tom Malchow shattered his own Olympic record to claim a gold medal in the event. Coming from third place on the final turn, he held off a challenge from fast-pacing Denys Sylantyev of Ukraine to touch the wall first in 1:55.35. Sylantyev trailed behind by almost half a second (0.50) to take a silver in 1:55.76, while Australia's Justin Norris settled for the bronze in an Oceanian record of 1:56.17.

Russia's Anatoly Polyakov finished outside the medals in 1:56.34. 15-year-old Michael Phelps, the youngest male U.S. Olympic swimmer in 68 years, continued to improve his personal best of 1:56.50, but it was only enough to pull off a fifth-place finish.

Phelps, who later emerged as the most-decorated Olympian of all-time, was followed in the sixth spot by Great Britain's Stephen Parry in 1:57.01. Defending Olympic champion Denis Pankratov seized a powerful lead on the first length, but faded shortly to seventh place in 1:57.97. France's Franck Esposito (1:58.39), bronze medalist in Barcelona eight years earlier, closed out the field.

Earlier, Malchow posted a top-seeded time of 1:56.25 on the morning prelims to cut off Melvin Stewart's 1992 Olympic record by a hundredth of a second (0.01). Followed by an evening session on day three, he eventually lowered it to 1:56.02 in the semifinals.

== Records ==
Prior to this competition, the existing world and Olympic records were as follows.

World record	Tom Malchow (USA)	1:55.18	Charlotte, United States	17 June 2000
Olympic record	Melvin Stewart (USA)	1:56.26	Barcelona, Spain	30 July 1992

The following new world and Olympic records were set during this competition.

Date	Event	Name	Nationality	Time	Record
18 September	Heat 6	Tom Malchow	United States	1:56.25	OR
18 September	Semifinal 2	Tom Malchow	United States	1:56.02	OR
19 September	Final	Tom Malchow	United States	1:55.35	OR

== Results ==
=== Heats ===
Rank	Heat	Lane	Name	Nationality	Time	Notes
1	6	4	Tom Malchow	United States	1:56.25	Q, OR
2	4	4	Denys Sylantyev	Ukraine	1:56.42	Q
3	5	3	Michael Phelps	United States	1:57.30	Q
4	6	6	Justin Norris	Australia	1:57.60	Q
5	5	5	Anatoly Polyakov	Russia	1:57.67	Q
6	6	3	James Hickman	Great Britain	1:57.88	Q
7	5	4	Franck Esposito	France	1:57.97	Q
8	6	5	Stephen Parry	Great Britain	1:58.00	Q
9	5	2	Denis Pankratov	Russia	1:58.01	Q
10	5	6	Takashi Yamamoto	Japan	1:58.07	Q
11	4	5	Thomas Rupprath	Germany	1:58.32	Q
12	4	3	Heath Ramsay	Australia	1:58.82	Q
13	6	8	Stefan Aartsen	Netherlands	1:58.89	Q
14	4	6	Hisayoshi Tanaka	Japan	1:59.00	Q
15	6	7	Andrew Livingston	Puerto Rico	1:59.05	Q
16	6	1	Sergey Fesenko	Ukraine	1:59.41	Q
17	4	2	Ioan Gherghel	Romania	1:59.48	
18	6	2	Shamek Pietucha	Canada	1:59.59	
19	5	8	Han Kyu-chul	South Korea	1:59.85	
20	5	7	Juan Veloz	Mexico	2:00.02	
21	3	6	Vladan Marković	FR Yugoslavia	2:00.11	
22	2	3	Anthony Ang	Malaysia	2:00.12	NR
23	4	1	Jorge Pérez	Spain	2:00.15	
24	3	4	Viktor Bodrogi	Hungary	2:00.74	
25	3	3	Ioannis Drymonakos	Greece	2:00.75	
26	3	1	Theo Verster	South Africa	2:00.90	
27	3	5	Gunter Rodríguez	Cuba	2:01.06	NR
28	3	2	Michael Windisch	Austria	2:01.20	NR
29	2	6	Zoran Lazarovski	Macedonia	2:01.30	
30	4	7	Massimiliano Eroli	Italy	2:01.32	
31	4	8	Michael Halika	Israel	2:01.97	
32	2	7	Mark Kwok Kin Ming	Hong Kong	2:01.99	
33	5	1	Xie Xufeng	China	2:02.00	
34	3	7	Tero Välimaa	Finland	2:02.46	
35	1	5	Tseng Cheng-hua	Chinese Taipei	2:03.62	
36	2	5	Juan Pablo Valdivieso	Peru	2:03.67	
37	3	8	Colin Lowth	Ireland	2:03.91	
38	2	2	Dulyarit Phuangthong	Thailand	2:04.15	
39	2	8	Lovrenco Franičević	Croatia	2:04.35	
40	1	3	Georgi Palazov	Bulgaria	2:04.40	
41	2	1	Konstantin Andriushin	Kyrgyzstan	2:04.86	
42	2	4	Albert Christiadi Sutanto	Indonesia	2:05.13	
43	1	4	Roberto Delgado	Ecuador	2:08.18	
44	1	6	Dumitru Zastoico	Moldova	2:09.34	
45	1	2	Dmitriy Tsutskarev	Uzbekistan	2:10.54	
46	1	7	Fadi Kouzmah	Syria	2:11.56	

=== Semifinals ===
==== Semifinal 1 ====
Rank	Lane	Name	Nationality	Time	Notes
1	4	Denys Sylantyev	Ukraine	1:56.81	Q
2	5	Justin Norris	Australia	1:57.10	Q
3	6	Stephen Parry	Great Britain	1:57.23	Q
4	2	Takashi Yamamoto	Japan	1:57.66	
5	3	James Hickman	Great Britain	1:57.84	
6	7	Heath Ramsay	Australia	1:57.90	
7	1	Hisayoshi Tanaka	Japan	1:58.06	
8	8	Sergey Fesenko	Ukraine	1:59.03	

==== Semifinal 2 ====
Rank	Lane	Name	Nationality	Time	Notes
1	4	Tom Malchow	United States	1:56.02	Q, OR
2	3	Anatoly Polyakov	Russia	1:56.78	Q
3	5	Michael Phelps	United States	1:57.00	Q
4	6	Franck Esposito	France	1:57.04	Q
5	2	Denis Pankratov	Russia	1:57.24	Q
6	8	Andrew Livingston	Puerto Rico	1:58.63	NR
7	1	Stefan Aartsen	Netherlands	1:58.66	
8	7	Thomas Rupprath	Germany	1:58.96	

=== Final ===
Rank	Lane	Name	Nationality	Time	Notes
1st place, gold medalist(s)	4	Tom Malchow	United States	1:55.35	OR
2nd place, silver medalist(s)	3	Denys Sylantyev	Ukraine	1:55.76	NR
3rd place, bronze medalist(s)	7	Justin Norris	Australia	1:56.17	OC
4	5	Anatoly Polyakov	Russia	1:56.34	
5	6	Michael Phelps	United States	1:56.50	
6	1	Stephen Parry	Great Britain	1:57.01	
7	8	Denis Pankratov	Russia	1:57.97	
8	2	Franck Esposito	France	1:58.39	
