= 1998 European Short Course Swimming Championships – Men's 200 metre butterfly =

The finals and the qualifying heats of the Men's 200 metres Butterfly event at the 1998 European Short Course Swimming Championships were held on the first day of the competition, on Friday 11 December 1998 in Sheffield, England.

== Finals ==
RANK	FINAL	TIME
Gold medal	James Hickman (GBR)	1:52.96
Silver medal	Denys Sylantyev (UKR)	1:54.13
Bronze medal	Thomas Rupprath (GER)	1:54.99
4.	Anatoly Polyakov (RUS)	1:55.39
5.	Vesa Hanski (FIN)	1:55.73
6.	Stefan Aartsen (NED)	1:56.19
7.	Chris-Carol Bremer (GER)	1:56.87
8.	Stephen Parry (GBR)	1:57.94

== Qualifying Heats ==
RANK	HEATS RANKING	TIME
1.	James Hickman (GBR)	1:54.89
2.	Anatoly Polyakov (RUS)	1:56.15
3.	Denys Sylantyev (UKR)	1:56.34
4.	Vesa Hanski (FIN)	1:56.44
5.	Thomas Rupprath (GER)	1:57.15
6.	Stefan Aartsen (NED)	1:57.46
7.	Chris-Carol Bremer (GER)	1:57.97
8.	Stephen Parry (GBR)	1:58.22
9.	Philippe Meyer (SUI)	1:58.93
10.	Jan Vitazka (CZE)	1:58.96
11.	Michael Halika (ISR)	1:59.75
12.	Lovrenco Franičević (CRO)	1:59.91
13.	David Abrard (FRA)	1:59.99
14.	Josef Horký (CZE)	2:00.03
15.	Ales Abersek (SLO)	2:00.63
16.	Ricardo Santos (POR)	2:01.86
17.	Philipp Gilgen (SUI)	2:02.06
18.	Colin Lowth (IRL)	2:02.06
19.	Aleksanda Miladinovski (MKD)	2:02.33
20.	Krzysztof Golon (POL)	2:02.46
21.	Péter Kovács (HUN)	2:02.68
22.	Mindaugas Bruzas (LTU)	2:03.10
23.	Georgios Vaiou (GRE)	2:04.36
24.	Tero Välimaa (FIN)	2:04.87
