= 1993 FINA World Swimming Championships (25 m) – Men's 200 metre butterfly =

These are the official results of the Men's 200 metres Butterfly event at the 1993 FINA Short Course World Championships held in Palma de Mallorca, Spain.

== Finals ==
RANK	FINAL A	TIME
	Franck Esposito (FRA)	1:55.42
	Christian Keller (GER)	1:55.75
	Chris-Carol Bremer (GER)	1:56.86
4.	Tom Malchow (USA)	1:56.87
5.	Rafał Szukała (POL)	1:57.02
6.	André Teixeira (BRA)	1:57.06
7.	Vesa Hanski (FIN)	1:58.42
8.	Jorge Perez (ESP)	1:59.06

== Qualifying heats ==
RANK	HEATS RANKING	TIME
1.	Franck Esposito (FRA)	1:56.41
2.	Christian Keller (GER)	1:57.16
3.	Rafał Szukała (POL)	1:57.72
4.	Tom Malchow (USA)	1:57.92
5.	Vesa Hanski (FIN)	1:58.58
6.	André Teixeira (BRA)	1:58.60
7.	Chris-Carol Bremer (GER)	1:58.91
8.	Jorge Perez (ESP)	1:59.73

== See also ==
- 1992 Men's Olympic Games 200m Butterfly
- 1993 Men's European LC Championships 200m Butterfly
