= Swimming at the 1992 Summer Olympics – Men's 200 metre butterfly =

Men's 200 metre butterfly at the Games of the XXV Olympiad
- Venue: Piscines Bernat Picornell
- Date: 30 July 1992 (heats & finals)
- Competitors: 46 from 32 nations
- Winning time: 1:56.26 OR

Medalists
1st place, gold medalist(s)		Melvin Stewart	United States
2nd place, silver medalist(s)		Danyon Loader	New Zealand
3rd place, bronze medalist(s)		Franck Esposito	France

The men's 200 metre butterfly event at the 1992 Summer Olympics took place on 30 July at the Piscines Bernat Picornell in Barcelona, Spain.

== Records ==
Prior to this competition, the existing world and Olympic records were as follows.

World record	Melvin Stewart (USA)	1:55.69	Perth, Australia	12 January 1991
Olympic record	Michael Gross (FRG)	1:56.94	Seoul, South Korea	24 September 1988

The following records were established during the competition:

Date	Round	Name	Nation	Time	Record
30 July	Final A	Melvin Stewart	United States	1:56.26	OR

== Results ==
=== Heats ===
Rule: The eight fastest swimmers advance to final A (Q), while the next eight to final B (q).

Rank	Heat	Lane	Name	Nationality	Time	Notes
1	7	4	Melvin Stewart	United States	1:56.99	Q
2	5	1	Danyon Loader	New Zealand	1:58.15	Q
3	5	5	Franck Esposito	France	1:58.75	Q
4	6	4	Martin Roberts	Australia	1:58.91	Q
5	7	3	Denis Pankratov	Unified Team	1:59.00	Q
6	7	1	Rafał Szukała	Poland	1:59.51	Q
7	5	2	Robert Pinter	Romania	1:59.59	Q
8	5	4	Keiichi Kawanaka	Japan	1:59.96	Q
9	6	8	Martin Herrmann	Germany	2:00.47	q
10	6	2	Chris-Carol Bremer	Germany	2:00.49	q
11	7	5	Can Ergenekan	Turkey	2:00.82	q, NR
12	6	3	David Wharton	United States	2:00.84	q
13	6	7	Simon McKillop-Davies	Australia	2:00.92	q
14	5	7	Marco Braida	Italy	2:01.18	q
15	2	5	Eduardo Piccinini	Brazil	2:01.20	q, NR
15	6	6	Tom Ponting	Canada	2:01.20	q
17	5	3	Tomohiro Miyoshi	Japan	2:01.27	
18	7	6	Konrad Gałka	Poland	2:01.33	
19	4	2	Matjaž Kozelj	Slovenia	2:01.39	NR
19	7	7	André Teixeira	Brazil	2:01.39	
21	4	4	José Luis Ballester	Spain	2:01.41	
22	4	5	Simon Wainwright	Great Britain	2:01.53	
23	6	5	Uğur Taner	Turkey	2:01.61	
24	5	8	Jorge Pérez	Spain	2:01.63	
25	6	1	Christophe Bordeau	France	2:01.99	
26	7	8	Edward Parenti	Canada	2:02.00	
27	4	3	Guy Callaghan	New Zealand	2:02.12	
28	3	6	Craig Jackson	South Africa	2:02.17	
29	3	4	Diogo Madeira	Portugal	2:02.22	
30	4	7	David Monasterio	Puerto Rico	2:02.32	
31	3	2	Vesa Hanski	Finland	2:02.75	
32	3	5	Alexander Brandl	Austria	2:02.88	
33	3	7	Denislav Kalchev	Bulgaria	2:03.73	
34	4	1	Miguel Cabrita	Portugal	2:04.28	
35	3	1	Khristian Minkovski	Bulgaria	2:05.18	
36	3	3	Kai Johansson	Finland	2:05.71	
37	2	4	Gary Tan	Singapore	2:06.41	
38	2	2	Duncan Todd	Hong Kong	2:08.20	
39	1	3	Kristan Singleton	Virgin Islands	2:08.71	NR
39	4	6	Kire Filipovski	Independent Olympic Participants	2:08.71	
41	1	7	Janko Gojković	Bosnia and Herzegovina	2:09.08	NR
42	1	5	Alan Espínola	Paraguay	2:11.88	
43	2	3	Benoît Fleurot	Mauritius	2:13.09	
44	2	7	Julian Bolling	Sri Lanka	2:17.47	
45	1	6	Ziyad Kashmiri	Saudi Arabia	2:21.59	
46	1	2	Mohamed Khamis	United Arab Emirates	2:29.73	

=== Finals ===
==== Final B ====
Rank	Lane	Name	Nationality	Time	Notes
9	5	Chris-Carol Bremer	Germany	1:59.93	
10	6	David Wharton	United States	2:01.08	
11	4	Martin Herrmann	Germany	2:01.14	
12	3	Can Ergenekan	Turkey	2:01.21	
13	1	Tom Ponting	Canada	2:01.60	
14	2	Simon McKillop-Davies	Australia	2:01.86	
15	8	Eduardo Piccinini	Brazil	2:01.87	
16	7	Marco Braida	Italy	2:02.24	

==== Final A ====
Rank	Lane	Name	Nationality	Time	Notes
1st place, gold medalist(s)	4	Melvin Stewart	United States	1:56.26	OR
2nd place, silver medalist(s)	5	Danyon Loader	New Zealand	1:57.93	
3rd place, bronze medalist(s)	3	Franck Esposito	France	1:58.51	
4	7	Rafał Szukała	Poland	1:58.89	
5	8	Keiichi Kawanaka	Japan	1:58.97	NR
6	2	Denis Pankratov	Unified Team	1:58.98	
7	1	Robert Pinter	Romania	1:59.34	NR
8	6	Martin Roberts	Australia	1:59.64	
