= 1997 FINA Short Course World Championships – Men's 100m butterfly =

The finals and the qualifying heats of the men's 100 metres butterfly event at the 1997 FINA Short Course World Championships were held on the first day of the competition, on Thursday 17 April 1997 in Gothenburg, Sweden.

== Finals ==
RANK	FINAL A	TIME
	Lars Frölander (SWE)	51.95
	Geoff Huegill (AUS)	51.99
	Michael Klim (AUS)	52.02
4.	James Hickman (GBR)	52.22
5.	Denys Sylantyev (UKR)	52.63
6.	Nate Dusing (USA)	52.64
7.	Edward Parenti (CAN)	52.71
8.	Garret Pulle (CAN)	52.74

RANK	FINAL B	TIME
9.	Denis Pankratov (RUS)	52.48
10.	Francisco Sánchez (VEN)	52.80
11.	Konstantin Ushkov (RUS)	53.12
12.	Zhang Qiang (CHN)	53.19
13.	Theo Verster (RSA)	53.29
14.	Ola Fagerstrand (SWE)	53.41
15.	Thomas Rupprath (GER)	53.72
16.	Hugo Duppre (BRA)	53.83

== See also ==
- 1996 Men's Olympic Games 100m Butterfly
- 1997 Men's European LC Championships 100m Butterfly
