= 1999 Pan Pacific Swimming Championships – Men's 200 metre butterfly =

Men's 200 metre butterfly at the 1999 Pan Pacific Swimming Championships
- Venue: Sydney International Aquatic Centre
- Dates: August 24, 1999 (heats & semifinals); August 25, 1999 (final)
- Competitors: 21 from 9 nations
- Winning time: 1:55.41

Medalists
gold medal	Tom Malchow	United States
silver medal	Takashi Yamamoto	Japan
bronze medal	Uğur Taner	United States

The men's 200 metre butterfly competition at the 1999 Pan Pacific Swimming Championships took place on August 24–25 at the Sydney International Aquatic Centre. The last champion was Uğur Taner of US.

This race consisted of four lengths of the pool, all lengths being in butterfly stroke.

== Records ==
Prior to this competition, the existing world and Pan Pacific records were as follows:

World record	Denis Pankratov (RUS)	1:55.22	Canet-en-Roussillon, France	June 14, 1995
Pan Pacific Championships record	Uğur Taner (USA)	1:57.35	Fukuoka, Japan	August 10, 1997

== Results ==
All times are in minutes and seconds.

KEY:	q	Fastest non-qualifiers	Q	Qualified	CR	Championships record	NR	National record	PB	Personal best	SB	Seasonal best

=== Heats ===
The first round was held on August 24.

Rank	Name	Nationality	Time	Notes
1	Tom Malchow	United States	1:56.07	Q, CR
2	Takashi Yamamoto	Japan	1:58.95	Q
3	Bill Kirby	Australia	1:59.05	Q
4	Greg Shaw	Australia	1:59.20	Q
5	Uğur Taner	United States	1:59.25	Q
6	Xie Xufeng	China	1:59.66	Q
7	Shamek Pietucha	Canada	2:00.27	Q
8	Justin Norris	Australia	2:00.35	Q
9	Hisayoshi Tanaka	Japan	2:00.54	Q
10	Han Kyu-Chul	South Korea	2:01.00	Q
11	Adam Sioui	Canada	2:01.41	Q
12	Philip Weiss	Canada	2:01.47	Q
13	Douglas Browne	Canada	2:02.77	Q
14	Trent Steed	Australia	2:02.82	Q
15	Theo Verster	South Africa	2:02.84	Q
16	Grant McGregor	Australia	2:03.01	
17	Craig Stevens	Australia	2:04.15	
18	Tatsuya Kinugasa	Japan	2:04.16	Q
19	Dean Kent	New Zealand	2:05.66	
20	Nicholas Sheeran	New Zealand	2:05.79	
21	Tseng Cheng-hua	Chinese Taipei	2:07.62	

=== Semifinals ===
The semifinals were held on August 24.

Rank	Name	Nationality	Time	Notes
1	Tom Malchow	United States	1:55.76	Q, CR
2	Uğur Taner	United States	1:57.68	Q
3	Takashi Yamamoto	Japan	1:58.74	Q
4	Bill Kirby	Australia	1:58.83	Q
5	Xie Xufeng	China	1:59.11	Q
6	Hisayoshi Tanaka	Japan	1:59.14	Q
7	Greg Shaw	Australia	1:59.19	Q
8	Shamek Pietucha	Canada	1:59.28	Q
9	Justin Norris	Australia	1:59.44	
10	Philip Weiss	Canada	2:00.51	
11	Adam Sioui	Canada	2:00.84	
12	Theo Verster	South Africa	2:01.63	
13	Trent Steed	Australia	2:02.83	
14	Douglas Browne	Canada	2:03.70	
15	Tatsuya Kinugasa	Japan	2:04.48	
-	Han Kyu-Chul	South Korea	DNS	

=== Final ===
The final was held on August 25.

Rank	Lane	Nationality	Time	Notes
1st place, gold medalist(s)	Tom Malchow	United States	1:55.41	CR
2nd place, silver medalist(s)	Takashi Yamamoto	Japan	1:57.33	
3rd place, bronze medalist(s)	Uğur Taner	United States	1:57.82	
4	Bill Kirby	Australia	1:58.53	
5	Greg Shaw	Australia	1:58.98	
6	Hisayoshi Tanaka	Japan	1:59.43	
7	Xie Xufeng	China	1:59.53	
8	Shamek Pietucha	Canada	2:00.00	
