= 1997 Pan Pacific Swimming Championships – Men's 200 metre butterfly =

Men's swimming competition

Men's 200 metre butterfly at the 1997 Pan Pacific Swimming Championships
- Venue: NISHI Civic Pool
- Dates: August 10, 1997 (heats & finals)
- Competitors: 18 from 8 nations
- Winning time: 1:57.35

Medalists
gold medal	Uğur Taner	United States
silver medal	Tom Malchow	United States
bronze medal	Scott Goodman	Australia

The men's 200 metre butterfly competition at the 1997 Pan Pacific Swimming Championships took place on August 10 at the NISHI Civic Pool. The last champion was Scott Miller of Australia.

This race consisted of four lengths of the pool, all lengths being in butterfly stroke.

== Records ==
Prior to this competition, the existing world and Pan Pacific records were as follows:

World record	Denis Pankratov (RUS)	1:55.22	Canet-en-Roussillon, France	June 14, 1995
Pan Pacific Championships record	Scott Miller (AUS)	1:57.86	Atlanta, United States	August 10, 1995

== Results ==
All times are in minutes and seconds.

KEY:	q	Fastest non-qualifiers	Q	Qualified	CR	Championships record	NR	National record	PB	Personal best	SB	Seasonal best

=== Heats ===
The first round was held on August 10.

Rank	Name	Nationality	Time	Notes
1	Uğur Taner	United States	1:57.94	QA
2	Tom Malchow	United States	1:58.29	QA
3	Scott Goodman	Australia	1:58.62	QA
4	Steven Brown	United States	1:59.34	QA
5	Nate Dusing	United States	1:59.50	QA
6	Casey Barrett	Canada	2:00.54	QA
7	Tom Wilkens	United States	2:01.29	QA
8	Takashi Yamamoto	Japan	2:01.30	QA
9	Edward Parenti	Canada	2:01.84	QB
10	Philip Weiss	Canada	2:01.91	QB
11	Han Kyu-chul	South Korea	2:01.94	QB
12	Greg Shaw	Australia	2:02.18	QB
13	Theo Verster	South Africa	2:02.61	QB
14	Hisayoshi Tanaka	Japan	2:03.30	QB
15	Trent Steed	Australia	2:03.36	QB
16	Juan Veloz	Mexico	2:03.80	QB
17	Kin Ming Kwok	Hong Kong	2:04.08	
18	Junya Kawakami	Japan	2:04.14	

=== B Final ===
The B final was held on August 10.

Rank	Name	Nationality	Time	Notes
9	Steven Brown	United States	1:59.76	
10	Philip Weiss	Canada	2:01.78	
11	Hisayoshi Tanaka	Japan	2:01.86	
12	Theo Verster	South Africa	2:02.68	
13	Trent Steed	Australia	2:03.42	
14	Kin Ming Kwok	Hong Kong	2:03.73	
15	Juan Veloz	Mexico	2:04.40	

=== A Final ===
The A final was held on August 10.

Rank	Lane	Nationality	Time	Notes
1st place, gold medalist(s)	Uğur Taner	United States	1:57.35	CR
2nd place, silver medalist(s)	Tom Malchow	United States	1:57.71	
3rd place, bronze medalist(s)	Scott Goodman	Australia	1:58.34	
4	Takashi Yamamoto	Japan	1:59.52	
5	Casey Barrett	Canada	2:00.83	
6	Han Kyu-chul	South Korea	2:00.87	
7	Edward Parenti	Canada	2:01.57	
8	Greg Shaw	Australia	2:01.75	
