= Malenko =

Malenko (Маленко) is a Slavic surname. Notable people with the surname include:

- Aleksandar Malenko (born 1979; Macedonian: Александар Маленко) Macedonian swimmer
- Boris Malenko (1933-1994, born Lawrence J. Simon; aka Russian: Бори́с Маленко́; ringname The Great Malenko) U.S. pro-wrestler
- Carl Malenko (born 1970, as Carl Ognibene) U.S. pro-wrestler
- Dean Malenko (born 1960, as Dean Simon) U.S. pro-wrestler
- Debbie Malenko
- Gregory Malenko, Ukrainian politician
- Joe Malenko (born 1956, as Jody Simon) U.S. pro-wrestler
- Natalya Malenko, Russian politician
