= Pedro Monteiro =

Pedro Monteiro may refer to:

- Pedro Monteiro (swimmer) (born 1975), Brazilian swimmer
- Pedro Monteiro (footballer) (born 1994), Portuguese footballer
