= John Hargis =

John Hargis may refer to:

- Colonel John Hargis (Kentucky settler), founder of Morehead, Kentucky
- John Hargis (basketball) (1920-1986)
- John Hargis (swimmer) (b.1975)
