= André Teixeira =

André Teixeira may refer to:

- André Teixeira (swimmer) (born 1973), Portuguese swimmer
- André Teixeira (footballer) (born 1993), Portuguese footballer
