= Alain Sergile =

Haitian swimmer (born 1972)

Personal information
- Born: February 15, 1972 (age 54) Roswell, Georgia, United States

Sport
- Sport: Swimming
- Strokes: Butterfly
- Club: SMU Mustangs

Alain Sergile (born February 15, 1972) is a Haitian swimmer who competed at the 1996 Summer Olympics in Atlanta, Georgia. He graduated from Southern Methodist University in 1994 where he was a member of the men's swimming and diving team. Sergile participated in the men's 100 meter butterfly, finishing with a time of 58.23 seconds. He did not advance to the finals.
