= Ashley Byrne =

British radio personality

Ashley A Byrne
- Born: 13 November 1972 (age 53); Doncaster, England
- Occupation: Radio personality

Ashley A Byrne is a radio and television presenter, newsreader and producer. He was born on 13 November 1972 in Doncaster, England. His father is the British artist, Tony Byrne.

He is a regular presenter of the BBC World Service history programmes Witness and Sporting Witness. He was previously presenter of current affairs programme 'Citizen Manchester LGBT' on BBC Radio Manchester and has also presented the news on BBC and commercial radio stations across the North of England and Midlands including Smooth Radio, Century, Lincs FM, TFM, BBC Radio Manchester, BBC North West (radio), Imagine FM, Signal Cheshire and The Pulse of West Yorkshire. He has also presented on BBC Radio 3 and narrated documentaries for ITV.

Byrne is Creative Director of the successful radio production company, Made in Manchester which he set up with business partner James Hickman, the five-times World Butterfly Swimming Champion in May 2005.

Programmes either produced or executive produced by Byrne for Made in Manchester include:

Year	Title	Presenter	Stations
2006	Another Fine Mess: 80 Years of Laurel and Hardy	Norman Wisdom	BBC Radio 2
2006	Cartoon Kings	David Jason	ITV1
2006	From Bomb to Boo	Ashley Byrne	ITV1
2006	Citizen Manchester Strand	Various	BBC Radio Manchester
2007	Jah Wobble's Mystical Musical Tour	Jah Wobble	BBC World Service
2007	Laughter and Tears: The Les Dawson Story	Jo Brand	BBC Radio 2
2007	I Got Up Out of My Seat	David Frost	BBC Radio 4
2008	Salt-N-Pepa: Push It	Mista Jam	BBC Radio 1Xtra
2008	Brass Britain	Stephen Tompkinson	BBC Radio 2
2008	Giving Way to a New Era	John Sergeant	BBC Radio 4
2008	In Search of Forgiveness	Julie Nicholson	BBC Radio 4
2008	How AIDS Changed America	Paul Michael Glaser	BBC Radio 2
2008	Pacific Ocean Blues: The Life and Death of Dennis Wilson	Roger Daltrey	BBC Radio 2
2008	Ali Abbas: In His Own Words	Hugh Sykes	BBC Radio 4
2009	Gay Life After Saddam	Aasmah Mir	BBC Radio 5 Live
2009	In Search of Sid	Jah Wobble	BBC Radio 4
2009	Walking with Whitman	Stuart Maconie	BBC Radio 4
2009	In Search of the Wantley Dragon	Ian McMillan	BBC Radio 4
2009	Dick Emery: The Comedy of Errors?	David Walliams	BBC Radio 2
2009	Benny Hill: The Untold Story	Ben Miller	BBC Radio 2
2009	Lead Belly: A Secret History of Rock and Roll	Eric Burdon	BBC Radio 2

In December 2007, Byrne managed to get Archbishop Desmond Tutu to apologise on behalf of the Anglican Church for the way in which some clergy had treated the world's LGBT community.

In April 2009, Made in Manchester came runner up in the Best Production Company in the North 'How Do' Awards

In May 2009, Byrne's 'Giving Way to a New Era' was nominated for a prestigious Sony Award.

In July 2009, Byrne's 'Gay Life After Saddam' for BBC Radio 5 Live (which also featured actors Samuel Barnett and Paul Kendrick) was described by the press as 'the BBC at its best' after it uncovered a catalogue of murder and torture being carried out against gay and trans Iraqis since the fall of Saddam Hussein in 2003.

In October 2009, Byrne's company Made in Manchester embarked on a pioneering experiment to promote and premiere new audio drama via The UK's Independent newspaper. Turing's Test (starring History Boys' actor Sam Barnett) rose as high as number 7 in its category on the iTunes downloads chart. Subsequent dramas have included Death in Genoa starring Simon Callow as Oscar Wilde and Suzie Pugh and a Monster Too (a children's drama starring Coronation Street actress Vicky Binns). It's thought more dramas may be on the cards and Byrne has expressed his ambition to create 'a new high-profile platform' for drama and comedy on the web.

Byrne is also a Director of RIG, the Radio Independents Trade Body and has been leading a campaign to persuade the BBC to commission more radio programming from outside London.
