= Dominik Galić =

Croatian swimmer

Personal information
- Born: 29 May 1975 (age 51) Zagreb, Yugoslavia

Sport
- Sport: Swimming

Dominik Galić (born 29 May 1975) is a Croatian swimmer. He competed in the men's 200 metre butterfly event at the 1996 Summer Olympics.
