= Janko Gojković =

Bosnian swimmer

Personal information
- Full name: Janko Gojković
- National team: Bosnia and Herzegovina
- Born: 14 April 1973 (age 53) Sarajevo, SR Bosnia and Herzegovina, SFR Yugoslavia

Sport
- Sport: Swimming
- Strokes: Freestyle, butterfly
- Club: PK Sarajevo; Long Beach Polytechnic High School (U.S.); City of Sheffield Swimming Club

Janko Gojković (born April 14, 1973) is a Bosnian former swimmer, who specialized in sprint freestyle and butterfly events. He is a three-time Olympian (1992, 1996, and 2000), and a member of the Bosnian swimming team since the breakup of SFR Yugoslavia in 1991. He held numerous Bosnian records in the 100 m butterfly, and achieved top finishes from the European Championships. After his sporting career ended in 2000, Gojković worked in various swim clubs across Great Britain and some parts of Eastern Europe.

== Career ==
=== Early years ===
Gojković, a native of Sarajevo, SR Bosnia and Herzegovina, started swimming at the age of seven as a member of PK Sarajevo under a former Yugoslav system. He accepted a full scholarship to attend the Long Beach Polytechnic High School in Long Beach, California, as an exchange student. He played for the school's swimming team, and also lettered in water polo, before his graduation in 1990. The following year, Gojković became a member of the SFR Yugoslavia team, and later achieved a top 5 finish in the 100 m butterfly at the European Championships in Athens, Greece.

=== International career ===
Gojković became the first ever swimmer to represent Bosnia and Herzegovina at the 1992 Summer Olympics in Barcelona since the breakup of SFR Yugoslavia. In the 100 m butterfly, Gojković posted a new Bosnian record of 56.81 to earn a second spot and forty-fourth overall in heat one, trailing Spain's top favorite Martín López-Zubero by a full body length of 2.77 seconds. Three days later, in the 200 m butterfly, he pulled off another second spot in the same heat at 2:09.08, but finished only in forty-first overall out of 46 swimmers from the prelims.

Shortly after his first Games, Gojković left war-torn Bosnia, and later attended college in Sheffield, England, where he majored in business and management. At the ASA National British Championships he won the 100 metres butterfly title in 1994. Following his graduation in 1996, Gojković traveled with the Bosnian team to the United States for a two-month pre-Olympic camp in Pell City, Alabama. Upon his team's arrival, the Bosnians received a warm welcome from the local residents, gathering on street corners and waving blue and gold flags. Gojković admitted that while his team gathered through the city proper, he opened a large atlas, and could not find a place called Pell City: "I didn't believe there was such a place."

On his second Olympic appearance in Atlanta 1996, Gojković failed to reach the top 16 final in any of his individual events, finishing thirty-sixth in the 100 m freestyle (51.28), and forty-first in the 100 m butterfly (56.11).

Two years later, at the 1998 FINA World Championships in Perth, Australia, Gojković delivered a spectacular swim with a thirty-third-place effort in the 100 m butterfly, posting a lifetime best of 56.02.

Gojković swam only in the men's 100 m butterfly, as a 27-year-old, at the 2000 Summer Olympics in Sydney. He achieved a FINA B-standard entry time of 56.26 from the Croatian Open Championships in Dubrovnik. He stormed home on the final lap to lead the second heat in a new Bosnian record of 55.55, holding off a fast-pacing Aleksandar Miladinovski of Macedonia by seven hundredths of a second (0.07). Gojković’s best effort was not enough to advance him into the semifinals, as he shared a thirty-ninth place tie with Venezuela's Oswaldo Quevedo in the prelims.

== Life after swimming ==
After his sporting career ended in 2000, Gojkovic worked as an age group coach in various swim clubs across Great Britain and some parts of Eastern Europe. He spent four years at Maxwell Swim Club in Aylesbury, England, before returning to his native Bosnia and Herzegovina in 2004. Currently, Gojkovic is appointed as the president and chief executive officer of PK Sarajevo and also, a media marketing manager for an advertising agency Via Mediji. Since August 2023, he has worked at Brighton College as Director of Swimming.
