= Javier Golovchenko =

Uruguayan swimmer

Personal information
- Born: 12 March 1974 (age 52)

Sport
- Sport: Swimming
- Strokes: Butterfly

Javier Golovchenko (born 12 March 1974) is a Uruguayan swimmer. He competed in the 100 metre butterfly and the 200 metre butterfly events at the 1996 Summer Olympics.

Golovchenko moved to Brazil in 1993 to train. He coached fellow Uruguayans Ines Remersaro and Martin Melconian at the 2016 Summer Olympics held in Rio de Janeiro.
