= David Pereyra =

Bolivian swimmer (born 1975)

Personal information
- Born: 8 August 1975 (age 50)

Sport
- Sport: Swimming

David Pereyra (born 8 August 1975) is a Bolivian swimmer. He competed in the men's 100 metre butterfly event at the 1996 Summer Olympics.
