= Aleksey Kolesnikov =

Russian swimmer

Personal information
- Born: 17 May 1977 (age 49)

Sport
- Sport: Swimming

Aleksey Kolesnikov (born 17 May 1977) is a Russian swimmer. He competed in the men's 200 metre butterfly event at the 1996 Summer Olympics.
