= Lee Jeong-hyeong =

South Korean swimmer

Personal information
- Born: 21 February 1977 (age 49)

Sport
- Sport: Swimming

Lee Jeong-hyeong (born 21 February 1977) is a South Korean swimmer. He competed in the men's 200 metre butterfly event at the 1996 Summer Olympics.
