= Paul Blair (swimming) =

American swimming coach

Paul Barr Blair
- Blair in 2005

Biographical details
- Born: May 19, 1949; Dover, Ohio, US
- Died: November 8, 2006 (aged 57); Little Rock, Arkansas, US
- Education: West Liberty State College

Playing career
- 1971-1975: West Liberty State College
- Position: freestyle swimming

Coaching career (HC unless noted)
- 1979-2006: Arkansas Dolphins; Swim Club
- 2005: University of Arkansas Little Rock Trojans; Asst. Coach Women's Swim Team

Accomplishments and honors

Championships
- USA Swimming 1988 U.S. Open title USA Swimming 1989 National title 10 time Region VIII Championship

Awards
- Region VIII Coach of the Year; Arkansas Coach of the Year; 2008 ASCA Hall of Fame; 2022 Arkansas Sports Hall of Fame

Paul Barr "Coach" Blair (May 19, 1949 – November 8, 2006) was a swim coach who specialized in sprint training, and was best known for coaching the Arkansas Dolphins Swim Club from 1979 to 2006.

Blair was born on May 19, 1949, in Dover, Ohio, and graduated Dover High School in 1967. He attended and swam for West Liberty State College in West Liberty, Virginia, now West Liberty University, and in 1971 was named to the National Association of Intercollegiate Athletics All-American team. In that year, he helped lead West Liberty swimmers to the conference title, taking 15 of 17 events and finishing the season 11–3. After graduating college in 1975, he served as a Swimming and Cross Country Coach at the Linsly School, a prep school in Wheeling, Virginia, only twelve miles from West Liberty State.

== Arkansas Dolphins Swim team coach ==
Blair was known around the world for his sprinting methods, which became apparent through the accomplishments of his swim team, the Arkansas Dolphins, based in Little Rock, Arkansas which he coached from 1979 to 2006.

Blair was one of the early coaches to emphasize the need for sprinters to have timed intervals to complete swim distances similar to the distances they would swim in competitions or somewhat longer, as the foundation for their workout sessions. This method would balance sprints with rest intervals to improve primarily speed, but would also benefit technique and endurance. In fact, many sprint coaches today have based portions of their swim workouts on Blair's coaching focus.

Blair led the Dolphins to a men's U.S.A. Swimming U.S. Open title in Indianapolis in December, 1988 and then a men's U.S.A. Swimming National title in Los Angeles in 1989 in less than ten years as head coach. It was one of the smallest teams to ever take a U.S. National Championship.

He was also an eight-time USA National Team coach, and coached the Arkansas Dolphins to 10 Region VIII Championship titles and 57 Arkansas State Age Group Championship titles. The Dolphins also had a Masters division for older swimmers that won National Championships.

== Outstanding swimmers ==
Coach Blair trained many notable swimmers, including John Hargis (Olympic gold medalist), Steve Crocker, Doug Boyd, Kicker Vencill, Matt Weghorst, Bobby O'Bryan, Tom Genz, Noel Strauss, and Manuel Twillie.

== 2005-6 University of Arkansas coach ==
In addition to being the head coach and owner of the Arkansas Dolphins Swim Team, he was also appointed and briefly served as an Assistant coach for the University of Arkansas–Little Rock Trojans Women's Swim Team in 2005.

== Honors ==
Blair was inducted into the Hall of Fame for his alma mater, West Liberty State College in 1991, and the Arkansas Swimming Hall of Fame in 1992. In 2004, he received the International Swimming Hall of Fame Yutaka Terao Award, and was posthumously inducted into the American Swimming Coaches Hall of Fame in 2008.

== Swimming administration ==
He served on the Olympic International Operations Committee, the International Swimming Hall of Fame Board of Governors, the State of Arkansas Governor's Council for Sport and Fitness, the USA Olympic Operations Committee and is past vice-president of the American Swim Coaches Association.

In the fall of 2006, his health declined. After a three-year battle with prostate cancer, Blair died on the morning of November 8, 2006 in Little Rock, and was survived by his wife Mary Dawn and three daughters.

== Team championships ==
- 1988 US Open Men's Team Champions
- 1989 US Men's Team National Champions
- 57 Arkansas State Age Group Championships
- 10 time Region VIII Team Champions

== Individual achievements ==
Blair coached swimmers who had the following individual achievements:

- 6 US National Champions
- 1 US Open National Champion
- 12 Junior National Champions
- 2 Olympic Festival Gold Medalists
- 35 National Age Group Champions
- 17 National Age Group Records
- 7 Masters National Champions
- 1 Pan American Silver Medalist
- 25 World Ranked Swimmers
- 25 Olympic Trials Qualifiers
- 4 Pan Pacific Team Members
- 6 Olympic Swimmers
- 1 World Team Silver Medalist
- 1 Olympic Gold Medalist
