= Simon McKillop-Davies =

Australian swimmer

Personal information
- Full name: Simon John McKillop-Davies
- Born: 23 September 1972 (age 53) New South Wales, Australia

Sport
- Sport: Swimming
- Strokes: Butterfly

Simon John McKillop-Davies (born 23 September 1972) is an Australian swimmer. He competed in the men's 200 metre butterfly event at the 1992 Summer Olympics.
