= Kai Johansson =

Finnish swimmer (born 1969)

Personal information
- Born: 30 December 1969 (age 56) Helsinki, Finland

Sport
- Sport: Swimming

Kai Johansson (born 30 December 1969) is a Finnish swimmer. He competed in the men's 200 metre butterfly event at the 1992 Summer Olympics.
