= Hans Lampe =

German swimmer

Personal information
- Born: June 28, 1948 (age 78) Hanover, Germany

Sport
- Sport: Swimming
- Strokes: Butterfly
Medal record
Representing West Germany
European Championships
Gold medal – first place	1970 Barcelona	100m butterfly

Hans Lampe (born 28 June 1948) is a German former swimmer who competed in the 1972 Summer Olympics. He was born in Hannover and is the brother of Werner Lampe, another successful swimmer.
