= Gregory Malenko =

Ukrainian politician, activist and entrepreneur

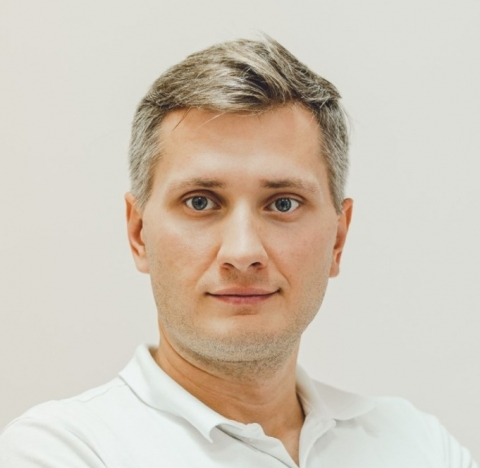
- Malenko in 2020
- Born: June 17, 1986 (age 40); Kyiv
- Education: Kyiv Polytechnic Institute
- Occupations: Internet Entrepreneur, online reputation management expert, SERM specialist, Managing partner at SERM agency, founder of MediaMonitoringBot
- Known for: Kyiv City Council deputy
- Office: Deputy of the Kyiv City Council
- Political party: Holos
- Spouse: Olena Malenko
- Children: 2 daughters
- Awards: Certificate of appreciation from the Ukrainian Armed Forces (2019); "Cross of Support" First Class (2023); Honorary Badge of the Commander-in-Chief of the Armed Forces of Ukraine "For Assistance to the Army" (2024); Medal "For Assistance to the Armed Forces of Ukraine" (2024); Order of Merit, Third Class (2026)

Gregory Malenko (born June 17, 1986) is a Ukrainian politician, public activist, internet entrepreneur, online reputation management expert, SERM specialist, and founder of MediaMonitoringBot. He has been a Kyiv City Council deputy representing the Holos party since 2020. He initiated the creation of the "Sribnyi Kil" park, covering an area of 7.54 hectares, around the lake of the same name in Kyiv, with construction starting in 2023.

== Early life and education ==
Gregory Malenko was born in Kiev (now Kyiv) in 1986. As a high school student, he attended Kyiv School No. 316 before transferring to Physics and Mathematics Lyceum No. 208. In 2003, he won a scientific competition under the auspices of the Small Academy of Sciences.

After finishing Physics and Mathematics Lyceum, Malenko enrolled in the Kyiv Polytechnic Institute, majoring in Software for Automated Systems, graduating in 2009.

== Career ==
In 2007, before completing university, Malenko worked as a project manager in the Kyiv office of Innovative Marketing Ukraine (IMU), focusing on software development and distribution in the North American market.

From 2009, he served as the director of development, and from 2011, as the marketing and development director of the media holding OBOZ.ua, where he focused on the growth of the Obozrevatel portal. Under his leadership in 2010, the portal underwent rebranding and redesign. Malenko focused on unifying the media holding’s resources under the single Obozrevatel brand.

== SERM ==
In late 2011, Malenko became the managing partner of "SERM" (Search Engine Reputation Management), the first Ukrainian agency specializing in online reputation management. In 2014, SERM expanded to comprehensive internet reputation management services.

== MediaMonitoringBot ==
In 2019, Malenko launched MediaMonitoringBot, a Telegram bot that provides real-time monitoring of Ukrainian media. Developed by the SERM team, it operates as an independent business unit. In December 2019, Malenko received a certificate of appreciation from the Ukrainian Armed Forces, signed by Valerii Zaluzhnyi, for his contributions to combating Russian propaganda and promoting Ukrainian independence. MediaMonitoringBot, is a leader among similar services, offering free monitoring in Ukraine.

In March 2022, Opendatabot included MediaMonitoringBot in the list of Ukrainian and foreign companies whose software could become an analog of software of Russian origin. The same month, the bot was included in the list “Made in Ukraine: 100+ Best MarTech & AdTech Startups in the Country."

== Educational and social activities ==
Since 2016, Malenko has collaborated with the Kyiv-Mohyla Business School as an invited expert, delivering lectures on topics such as "SERM & SMRM — Reputation Management in Search Engines and Social Media." He has also written for publications like AIN, Ukrainska Pravda, MMR, and others.

In 2017, he founded the Darnychany foundation to support elderly individuals, people with disabilities, and orphans. In May 2022, the foundation launched the "Ukraine — A Great Family" project to aid large families affected by the Russo-Ukrainian War.

In 2021, Malenko established the NGO "Sribnyi Kil Park" and initiated the creation of a 7.54-hectare park around Sribnyi Kil Lake in Kyiv's Darnytskyi District. Construction began in 2023 and is planned in six stages.

Following the Russian invasion of Ukraine on February 24, 2022, Malenko volunteered to support territorial defense battalions in Kyiv. In June 2022, he advocated revoking Minsk’s status as Kyiv’s sister city. In September 2022, he called on the international IT community to implement mandatory screening for Russian IT specialists.

== Political career ==
In 2015, Malenko entered politics by joining Self Reliance, serving on the public council at the Ministry of Internal Affairs of Ukraine, and leading the party’s Darnytskyi District organization. In 2017, he joined the executive committee of Self Reliance in Kyiv.

In 2018, he managed Andrii Sadovyi's presidential campaign in Kyiv. During the 2019 parliamentary elections, Malenko was listed 35th on the party list.

In 2020, he led the Kyiv election headquarters of the political party Holos and was included in the party's electoral list for the Kyiv City Council at position number 5.

On December 1, 2020, during the first plenary session of the Kyiv City Council of the 9th convocation, he took the oath of office and received his credentials as a Kyiv City Council deputy. Previously, Malenko had been elected head of the Holos party faction in the Kyiv City Council.

Since 2020, he has served as the first deputy chairman of the Kyiv City Council's Standing Commission on Architecture, Urban Development, and Land Relations. In October 2021, he authored a draft resolution proposing that the Kyiv City Council address Ukraine’s Ministry of Culture and Information Policy to transfer the building of the Saint Nicholas Roman Catholic Church in Kyiv to the Roman Catholic community.

In July 2021, Malenko became a member of the political council of Holos.

In December 2022, Gregory Malenko, with Taiwan's Minister of Foreign Affairs Joseph Wu and Kyiv Mayor Vitali Klitschko signed a memorandum on Taiwan’s funding for the purchase of generators for Kyiv. By early January 2023, the first batch of generators had been delivered to Kyiv.

In April 2023, Malenko led a Kyiv delegation to Taipei, Taiwan, to advance cooperation between the two capitals. During the visit, a memorandum of collaboration was signed.

On February 8, 2024, during a Kyiv City Council session, Malenko publicly addressed delays in disbursing the promised one-time assistance of 30,000 UAH to Kyiv residents mobilized into the Ukrainian Armed Forces.

== Awards ==
In December 2023 Malenko, was awarded the honorary military medal "Cross of Support" First Class for contributions to supporting the Ukrainian Armed Forces, an effort spearheaded by the charitable foundation "Darnychany," which he has led since 2017.

In December 2024, he was awarded Medal “For Assistance to the Armed Forces of Ukraine”.

In 2024, he was awarded the Honorary Badge of the Commander-in-Chief of the Armed Forces of Ukraine "For Assistance to the Army", an award of the Commander-in-Chief of the Armed Forces of Ukraine.

On 22 January 2026, Gregory Malenko was awarded the Order of Merit, Third Class, by the President of Ukraine.
