= Tom Malchow =

American swimmer (born 1976)

Personal information
- Full name: Thomas Andrew Malchow
- National team: United States
- Born: August 18, 1976 (age 49) St. Paul, Minnesota, U.S.
- Height: 6 ft 6 in (1.98 m)
- Weight: 190 lb (86 kg)
- Spouse: Mairin

Sport
- Sport: Swimming
- Strokes: Butterfly, Freestyle
- Club: Star Swim Team, St. Paul; Club Wolverine
- College team: University of Michigan (1995)
- Coach: Steve Stewart (St. Thomas); Paul Lundsten (Star Swim); Jon Urbanchek (Michigan)
Medal record
Men's swimming
Representing the United States
Olympic Games
Gold medal – first place	2000 Sydney	200 m butterfly
Silver medal – second place	1996 Atlanta	200 m butterfly
World Championships (LC)
Silver medal – second place	2001 Fukuoka	200 m butterfly
Bronze medal – third place	1998 Perth	200 m butterfly
Bronze medal – third place	2003 Barcelona	200 m butterfly
Pan Pacific Championships
Gold medal – first place	1997 Fukuoka	4×200 m freestyle
Gold medal – first place	1999 Sydney	200 m butterfly
Gold medal – first place	2002 Yokohama	200 m butterfly
Silver medal – second place	1997 Fukuoka	200 m butterfly
Silver medal – second place	1999 Sydney	4×200 m freestyle
Pan American Games
Silver medal – second place	1995 Mar del Plata	200 m butterfly
Universiade
Gold medal – first place	1995 Fukuoka	200 m butterfly

Thomas Andrew Malchow (born August 18, 1976), is an American retired competition swimmer who set a world record in the 200-meter butterfly in 2000, and was a 200-meter butterfly gold medalist in the 2000 Sydney Olympics. He competed for the University of Michigan, represented the U.S. in three Olympics from 1996-2004, and won a silver medal in the 200-meter butterfly at the 1996 Atlanta Olympics.

Malchow was an only child born on August 18, 1976, in St. Paul, Minnesota, to father Tim, an attorney, and mother Mary Jo, a school teacher, and spent most of his youth growing up in the small Southeastern Minnesota town of Mendota Heights, a twin-cities suburb six miles South of St. Paul.

== Early swimming with Star Swim Team ==
He began swimming early, to reduce the effects of chronic childhood asthma which later would be punctuated with bouts of pneumonia and occasional hospitalizations. From as early as seven years, he trained with Coach Paul Lundsten of the Star Swimming team, a member of United States Swimming, founded in 1980 by Lundsten and his wife Sue in greater St. Paul. Under Lundsten's mentorship, a coach who he credited with teaching him to swim butterfly, Malchow would eventually excel in state, zone and sectional meets. Having trained for several years with the Star Team, on August 10, 1990, in the 13-14 age group, he placed first in the Boy's 100 butterfly at the United States Swimming (USS) Central Zone Championships in Grand Forks, North Dakota, with a 1:01.53.

== Saint Thomas Academy ==
A tall but slim youngster, Malchow played both basketball and baseball in grade school where he was not a top performer, but excelled early and more notably in swimming. His adolescent growth spurts caused joint pain and casting of his knees, which prompted one of his doctors to recommend that Malchow focus on swimming and end his participation in higher impact sports like basketball and baseball. He attended high school at the nearby Saint Thomas Academy, a private all-male Catholic military school, where he swam for the strong program led by Head Coach Steve Stewart, who coached from 1991 to 1998. Stewart had a winning percentage of 85.6% in prep school league dual meets during his eight-year career with Saint Thomas, the second highest of any listed St. Thomas Academy coach. In regular conference play during Malchow's freshman, sophomore, junior and senior years, St. Thomas went a combined 34-6, and went undefeated his senior year at 10-0. Coach Stewart's 1995 St. Thomas State Championship team started a winning dynasty, with St. Thomas winning the Minnesota Swimming and Diving team championship for fifteen successive years. Coach John Barnes, who succeeded Coach Stewart won 11 successive victories beginning in 1998 when he succeeded Stewart.

=== High school swimming achievements ===
Competing for the Saint Thomas Academy swim team, Malchow was state champion in varying years in the 200 freestyle, 500 freestyle, and 100 butterfly, though his primary objective would soon be to perform well in national not state or regional meets. In the 1993 Minnesota State Championship, Malchow won the 200-yard freestyle with a 1:41.83, and the 100-yard butterfly with a 49.89. For the first time during his swim career at St. Thomas Academy, during his senior year in March, 1995, the swim team won the Minnesota High School League team State Championship at the University of Minnesota with Malchow swimming on the winning St. Thomas 200 medley relay team that recorded a combined time of 1:37.60. Malchow's other 1995 State Championship titles came in the individual 500 freestyle where he swam a state record time of 4:28.00, and on the winning St. Thomas 4x100 freestyle relay team where he swam anchor for a combined team time of 3:10.20. Summarizing his years at St. Thomas, Malchow established seven school records, seven conference records, and two state records. Under Lundsten's mentorship, a coach who he credited with teaching him to swim butterfly, Malchow excelled in state, zone and sectional meets. Skilled in all four strokes while swimming for St. Thomas, he eventually held the pool record in every swimming event.

== University of Michigan ==
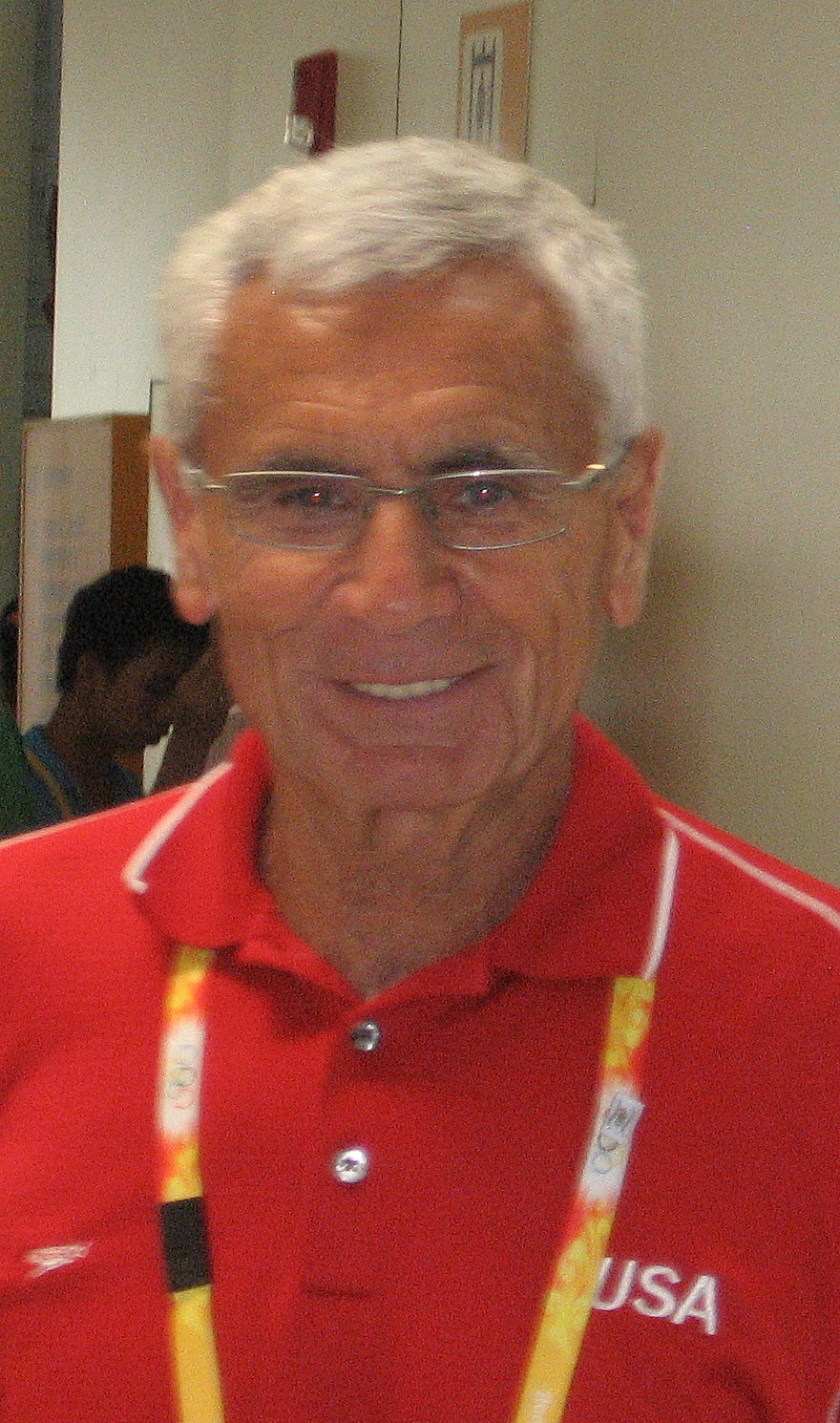
Coach J. Urbanchek

Malchow attended the University of Michigan on an athletic scholarship beginning in the fall of 1995, graduating in 1999, where he trained and competed under Hall of Fame Head Coach Jon Urbanchek, a former competitive swimmer for the university where he had won the one-mile NCAA freestyle championship in 1961. Urbanchek's prior experience competing in freestyle distance events, and his innovative coaching approach to improving stroke technique and cautiously increasing training intensity would benefit Malchow during his time at Michigan. As one of the best swim team scholars, Malchow maintained a 3.23 grade point average through his senior year, while majoring in sports management. A co-captain in his senior year, Malchow was a Big Ten Conference Champion seven-times, an All American seven times, a 1997 NCAA champion in the 200 fly and as part of the 800 free relay, and a 1998 NCAA champion in the 200 butterfly.

In preparation for the Olympics, Malchow swam as much as 18,000 meters a day, usually doing mostly freestyle sets to improve his endurance. He needed extra endurance to compensate for his turns, one of his weaknesses where he often lost time, particularly to elite world-ranked competitors. The lack of turns in Olympic competition became one of his strengths, as Olympic meets were held in 50 meter "long course" pools, rather than 25 meter pools.

== Olympics 1996-2004 ==
Malchow represented the United States in three consecutive Summer Olympics.

On March 8, 1996, at the U.S. Olympic trials in Indianapolis, Malchow swam a 1:59 in the 200-meter butterfly finals to place first, ahead of the former Barcelona Olympic 200 meter butterfly record holder and gold medalist, Mel Stewart. The first-place finish qualified Malchow for the Men's U.S. Olympic team.

As the youngest member of the U.S. team at the 1996 Summer Olympics in Atlanta at 20, he received a silver medal for his second-place performance in the finals of the men's 200-meter butterfly with a time of 1:57.44, just edging out the bronze medalist by only four hundredths of a second. Demonstrating his endurance with a late burst of speed, Malchow came from sixth place at the final turn to overtake all but one of the lead swimmers. Dennis Pankratov of Russia took the Gold with a 1:56.51, and Australian Scott Goodman took the Bronze medal, closely following Malchow in 1:57.48. That year, University of Michigan swim team had 8 team members who competed as Olympians for the U.S. and other countries.

Four years later at the 2000 Summer Olympics in Sydney, Malchow, considered a favorite, set Olympic record times in the preliminary heats of the 200-meter butterfly. He later won the gold medal in the men's 200-meter butterfly finals setting a new Olympic record time of 1:55.35. Malchow became the first Minnesotan to win an individual Olympic gold medal. Malchow employed his typical strategy of coming from behind as the event progressed, and at the 50-meter turn Malchow was fifth, while moving to third at the 100-meter mark. He moved to second at 150 meters, finally overtaking the leader in the last 50 meters of the event. Denis Sylantiev of Ukraine took the silver with a 1:55.76, and Justin Norris of Australia, a favorite of the home-town crowd, took the silver with a 1:56.17. Former 1996 Atlanta 200 butterfly gold medalist Denis Pankratov of Russia took an early lead on world record pace, but faded to seventh at the end.

Shortly before the July 2004 Olympic Trials in Long Beach, California, Malchow suffered a rotator cuff injury, though he was able to qualify for the Olympic team in the 200-meter fly with a 1:57.37, placing second to Michael Phelps's 1:54.31. Malchow served as a captain of the U.S. Men's Swimming Team at the 2004 Summer Olympics in Athens, finishing eighth in the finals of the 200-meter butterfly, with a time of 1:57.48.

=== International competition highlights ===
At the Charlotte Ultra-Swim in Charlotte, North Carolina, on June 17, 2000, Malchow established a new world record in the 200-meter butterfly of 1:55.18, bettering the former record of rival Denis Pankratov of Russia set in 1995.

In the 1995 Pan American Games in Mar del Plata, Malchow won a silver in the 200-meter butterfly, and in the 1995 Universiade in Fukuoka, he won a silver in the 200-meter butterfly.

He won a gold medal in the 1997 Pan Pacific Swimming Championships in 1997 in Fukuoka, a gold in the Men's 4 × 200 metre freestyle relay, and a silver in the Men's 200-meter butterfly. In the 1999 Pan Pacifics in Sydney, he won a gold in the Men's 200-meter butterfly and a silver in the Men's 4x200-meter relay. In the 2002 Pan Pacifics in Yokohama, he won a gold in the 200-meter butterfly.

=== Honors ===
At Michigan, Malchow was a 1997 Big Ten swimmer of the year. Malchow was a 2008 inductee to the St. Thomas Academy Athletic Hall of Fame. In an exclusive honor, likely for his dominance of the 200-meter butterfly in collegiate and international meets during his competitive years, he was made a member of the International Swimming Hall of Fame as a Swimmer Honoree.

Malchow would later live in the Pacific Northwest. He has worked for Zimmer Northwest, a regional branch of Zimmer Biomet as an orthopedic sales rep. Zimmer Biomet distributes medical products that include Knee and hip replacements, shoulder and spine care, and sports medicine, though Malchow's focus likely included their sales of orthopedic appliances, and devices that might be used for sports injuries including braces and orthotics.

== See also ==
- List of Olympic medalists in swimming (men)
- List of University of Michigan alumni
- List of World Aquatics Championships medalists in swimming (men)
- World record progression 200 metres butterfly

Records
Preceded by Denis Pankratov	Men's 200-meter butterfly world record-holder (long course); June 17, 2000 – March 30, 2001	Succeeded by Michael Phelps
