= Dmitry Pankov (swimmer) =

Uzbekistani swimmer (born 1968)

Personal information
- Born: 23 June 1968 (age 58)

Sport
- Sport: Swimming

Dmitry Pankov (born 23 June 1968) is an Uzbekistani butterfly and freestyle swimmer. He competed in two events at the 1996 Summer Olympics.
