= Konrad Gałka =

Polish swimmer (born 1974)

Personal information
- Full name: Konrad Piotr Michał Gałka
- Nationality: Poland
- Born: February 3, 1974 (age 52) Kraków, Małopolskie
- Height: 1.83 m (6 ft 0 in)

Sport
- Sport: Swimming
- Strokes: Butterfly
- Club: Wisła Kraków
Medal record
Men's swimming
Representing Poland
European Championships (LC)
Silver medal – second place	1995 Vienna	200 m butterfly

Konrad Gałka (born February 3, 1974, in Kraków) is a former butterfly swimmer from Poland, who competed in two consecutive Summer Olympics for his native country, starting in 1992.
