= David Abrard =

French swimmer

Personal information
- Nationality: France
- Born: 27 November 1976 (age 49) Sainte-Adresse, Seine-Maritime
- Height: 6 ft 2 in (187 cm)
- Weight: 179 lb (81 kg)

Sport
- Sport: Swimming
- Strokes: butterfly
- Club: Club Nautique Havrais
Medal record
European Championships (SC)
Bronze medal – third place	1996 Rostock	200 m butterfly

David Abrard (born 27 November 1976 in Sainte-Adresse, Seine-Maritime) is a retired butterfly swimmer from France, who represented his native country at the 1996 Summer Olympics in Atlanta, Georgia.

Abrard is best known for winning the bronze medal in the men's 200 m butterfly at the 1996 European SC Championships in Rostock, alongside Switzerland's Adrian Andermatt.
