= Oliver Lampe =

German swimmer

Personal information
- Born: 9 April 1974 (age 52) Hannover, Niedersachsen, West Germany
Medal record
Men's swimming
Representing Germany
Olympic Games
Bronze medal – third place	1996 Atlanta	4×200 m freestyle
World Championships (LC)
Bronze medal – third place	1994 Rome	4×200 m freestyle
European Championships (LC)
Gold medal – first place	1995 Vienna	4×200 m freestyle
Summer Universiade
Silver medal – second place	1993 Buffalo	200 m butterfly
Bronze medal – third place	1993 Buffalo	100 m butterfly

Oliver Lampe (born 9 April 1974 in Hannover, Niedersachsen) is a former butterfly and freestyle swimmer from Germany, who represented his native country at the 1996 Summer Olympics in Atlanta, Georgia.

There he swam in the preliminary heats of the Men's 4×200 m freestyle relay, which eventually won the bronze medal in the final. A member of Sportverein Arpke he is the son of 1972 Olympian Werner Lampe, and a nephew of Hans Lampe.
