= Casey Barrett =

Canadian swimmer (born 1975)

Personal information
- Full name: Casey Barrett
- National team: Canada
- Born: February 16, 1975 (age 51) Montreal, Quebec, Canada
- Height: 1.83 m (6 ft 0 in)
- Weight: 78 kg (172 lb)

Sport
- Sport: Swimming
- Strokes: Butterfly
- Club: Pacific Dolphins

Casey Barrett (born February 16, 1975) is a Canadian former Olympic swimmer, writer, and the co-founder and co-CEO of Imagine Swimming, Inc, New York City's largest learn-to-swim program. He is the author of the Duck Darley crime series, with the first Duck Darley novel, Under Water, published in fall 2017.

== Swimming career ==
Barrett learned to swim when he was four-years-old on Dorval Island, outside of Montreal, Quebec, Canada. He started swimming competitively with the North Baltimore Aquatic Club and later at the Bolles School in Jacksonville, Florida. In college, he was a nine-time All-American at the University of Southern California and Southern Methodist University. In 1996, Barrett was a member of the Canadian Olympic swim team in Atlanta, where he placed 11th in the 200-metre butterfly.

In 2002, Barrett co-founded Imagine Swimming, Inc. with partner, former German national team member and University of California, Berkeley alum, Lars Merseburg. The school teaches thousands of students each week, between the ages of 6 months and 12 years, at pools across Manhattan and Brooklyn, with a flagship location in TriBeCa. Imagine Swimming also oversees the Manhattan Makos swim team, the Mako Polo water polo team, and the synchronized swimming team, Imagine Synchro.

== Writing career ==
Barrett's first novel "Under Water" was released by Kensington Books in November 2017. It is the first in a series of swim-centric crime novels, in which investigator Duck Darley searches the city for a missing girl, whose older brother was an Olympic swimming champion and former teammate. The mysteries explore the darker sides of sport and present day scandal in New York City.

Barrett has also won three Emmy Awards and one Peabody Award for his work on NBC's coverage of the Olympic Games. At the 2004, 2006, and 2008 Games, he served as one of Bob Costas's Primetime Writers. He writes the swimming blog "Cap & Goggles", founded in 2011, and is a regular contributor to the Village Voice, with a focus on books and culture.

== Bibliography ==
Duck Darley:
1. Under Water (2017)
2. Against Nature (2018)
3. The Tower of Songs (TBD 2019)
