= Jesús González (swimmer) =

Mexican swimmer (born 1974)

Personal information
- Born: 4 October 1974 (age 50)

Sport
- Sport: Swimming

Jesús González (born 4 October 1974) is a Mexican swimmer. He competed in the men's 100 meter butterfly event at the 1996 Summer Olympics.
