= Yoav Meiri =

Israeli swimmer

Personal information
- Native name: יואב מאירי
- Full name: Yoav Meiri
- National team: Israel
- Born: 28 July 1975 (age 51) Jerusalem, Israel
- Height: 1.76 m (5 ft 9 in)
- Weight: 75 kg (165 lb)

Sport
- Sport: Swimming
- Strokes: Butterfly
- College team: University of Minnesota (U.S.)
- Coach: Dennis Dale/Clark Campbell (U.S.)

Yoav Meiri (Hebrew: יואב מאירי; born July 28, 1975) is an Israeli former swimmer, who specialized in butterfly events. He is a 2000 Olympian, a 20-time Israeli champion, and a four-time national record holder in sprint butterfly. While studying in the United States, he earned All-American and All-Big Ten honors in the 200-yard butterfly as a member of the University of Minnesota swimming and diving team.

Meiri accepted an athletic scholarship to attend the University of Minnesota in Minneapolis, Minnesota, where he played for the Minnesota Golden Gophers under head coach Dennis Dale and then Assistant Coach Clark Campbell. While swimming for the Gophers, he recorded a second-fastest time (1:45.98) in the 200 m butterfly at the 2000 Big Ten Conference Championships, and fifteenth at the NCAA Championships (1:58.75) to earn All-American honors.

Meiri competed in two swimming events for Israel at the 2000 Summer Olympics in Sydney. He achieved a FINA B-cut of 55.25 (100 m butterfly) from the European Championships in Helsinki. On the sixth day of the Games, Meiri placed thirty-seventh in the 100 m butterfly. Swimming in heat four, he picked up a fourth seed by 63-hundredths of a second behind winner Simão Morgado of Portugal in 55.38. Meiri also teamed up with Eithan Urbach, Tal Stricker, and Yoav Bruck in the 4 × 100 m medley relay. Swimming a butterfly leg in heat two, Meiri recorded a split of 54.54, but the Israelis settled only for fifth place and seventeenth overall in a final time of 3:43.39.
