= John Hargis (swimmer) =

American swimmer

Personal information
- Full name: John Lawson Hargis
- National team: United States
- Born: July 3, 1975 (age 51) Clinton, Arkansas, U.S.
- Height: 6 ft 2 in (1.88 m)
- Weight: 174 lb (79 kg)

Sport
- Sport: Swimming
- Strokes: Butterfly
- Club: Little Rock Racquet Club
- College team: Auburn University
- Coach: Paul Blair; Racquet Club
Medal record
Men's swimming
Representing the United States
Olympic Games
Gold medal – first place	1996 Atlanta	4×100 m medley

Coaching career (HC unless noted)
- 2002-2003: U of Nevada, Las Vegas (UNLV); Asst. Coach
- 2003-2006: Penn State University; Asst. Coach
- 2006-2008: Arkansas Dolphins Swim Club; U of Arkansas Women
- 2008-2013: Penn State University; Head coach
- 2013-2016: Auburn University; Head coach
- 2016-2022: University of Pittsburgh; Head coach

Accomplishments and honors

Championships
- 2 Big Ten Championships; Penn State Women

John Lawson Hargis (born July 3, 1975) is an American former competition swimmer, Olympic gold medalist, and college swimming coach. Hargis represented the United States at the 1996 Summer Olympics, and was a member of the gold medal-winning U.S. 4×100-meter medley relay team. In his twenty year coaching career, he was the head coach of the Pittsburgh Panthers swimming and diving team at University of Pittsburgh from 2016 to 2022, and had formerly coached at Auburn, and Penn State.

== Biography ==
Hargis began his competitive swimming career early on in life with coach Paul Blair with the Arkansas Dolphins swim club based in Little Rock, Arkansas. His stroke specialties were butterfly and backstroke competing in both the 100- and 200-meter distances as well as competing in other events throughout his club swimming career. After graduating high school Hargis decided to have a collegiate swimming career and chose to attend Auburn University. While at Auburn, Hargis had several successes ending his collegiate career. He went to the 1996 Olympic Games for the 100-meter butterfly and winning a gold medal in the 4x100 medley relay. In 1997, his senior year, he led Auburn to its first national championship. After Hargis' swimming career ended, he married his wife, Lauren and they have two sons and a daughter John, Nathan, and Faith.

== Achievements as swimmer ==
Hargis has had a number of achievements in both his coaching career and his swimming career. He was selected as one of Arkansas's 100 Greatest Athletes, three-time Southeastern Conference 100-yard butterfly champion, and a 12-time college All-American. He was a member of the 1996 U.S. Olympic team where he became an Olympic gold medalist in the 4×100-meter medley relay. He was captain of 1997 national championship swim team and a member of world championship swim team in 1998. After his career had ended Hargis was nominated and inducted into Arkansas Swimming Hall of Fame in 2001.

== Olympics ==
Hargis qualified for the U.S. Olympic trials in 1996 and went on to compete in the meet at the age of 21 years. He went into the meet like any other athlete, not a favorite of any sort. He advanced to the finals and won the Olympic Trials in the 100-meter butterfly in the time of 53.42. Once at the Games, Hargis qualified for B Finals with a time of 54.06. In the B Final, he swam a time of 54.29 placing him 16th overall. Hargis swam a time of 53.34 in the 100-meter butterfly in the preliminary heats of the men's 4×100-meter medley relay earning him a gold medal.

== Coaching ==
To date, Hargis has coached swimming at five universities and one prestigious swim club, the Little Rock Arkansas Dolphins.

=== UNLV, Penn State ===
Hargis graduated from Auburn in 1999 with his Bachelor of Science degree in health promotion and sports management. From there he began his career as a coach. After college he served as an assistant to the athletic director at Auburn. Then he coached at University of Nevada, Las Vegas (UNLV) for the 2002-2003 season. After coaching UNLV for a year, he went on as an assistant for Penn State University, coaching them for three years, including back to back women's Big Ten Conference championships.

=== Dolphins, U of Arkansas ===
In November 2006 he moved back to Little Rock, Arkansas, to coach his old club team, the Arkansas Dolphins, where he had been coached by Head Coach Paul Blair. Shortly thereafter he was made the head coach and CEO of the club as well as the head coach of the women's team at University of Arkansas, Little Rock from 2007 to 2008. Hargis briefly became his old coach Paul Blair's replacement after Blair died in 2006.

=== Penn State, Auburn, Pitt ===
In July 2008, Hargis left his Arkansas Dolphins club team to go back to Penn State University where he served as the head coach for five years from 2008 to 2013. In June 2013 he accepted the associate head coaching position at his alma mater, Auburn University, serving until 2016. On April 5, 2016, he was named as the head coach of the swimming and diving team at the University of Pittsburgh. After serving as coach for six years, in March 2022 Hargis announced his retirement as Head Coach of the University of Pittsburgh swimming team.

== See also ==
- List of Auburn University people
- List of Olympic medalists in swimming (men)
