= André Teixeira (swimmer) =

Brazilian swimmer

Personal information
- Full name: André Luiz Castro Teixeira
- Nationality: Brazil
- Born: April 24, 1974 (age 52) Rio de Janeiro, Rio de Janeiro, Brazil
- Height: 1.92 m (6 ft 4 in)
- Weight: 78 kg (172 lb)

Sport
- Sport: Swimming
- Strokes: Butterfly, Freestyle
Medal record
Men's swimming
Representing Brazil
World Championships (LC)
Bronze medal – third place	1994 Rome	4×100 m freestyle
Pan American Games
Silver medal – second place	1995 Mar del Plata	4×100 m medley
Bronze medal – third place	1995 Mar del Plata	200 m butterfly

André Luiz Castro Teixeira (born April 24, 1974 in Rio de Janeiro) is a former international butterfly and freestyle swimmer from Brazil. He participated in two consecutive Summer Olympics for his native country, starting in 1992. His best result was in Atlanta, Georgia where he came tenth in the men's 4×200-metre freestyle.

At the 1992 Summer Olympics, in Barcelona, Teixeira finished 19th in the 200-metre butterfly.

Teixeira participated at the 1993 FINA World Swimming Championships (25 m), in Palma de Mallorca, where he finished 6th in the 200-metre butterfly, breaking the South American record, with a time of 1:57.06. He also finished 10th in the 100-metre butterfly.

At the 1994 World Aquatics Championships, held in September in Rome, Italy, the Brazilian got the bronze in the 4×100-metre freestyle, and finished 20th in the 100-metre butterfly.

Teixeira swam at the 1995 Pan American Games held in March in Argentina, where he won a silver medal in the 4×100-metre medley, and a bronze medal in the 200-metre butterfly.

At the 1996 Summer Olympics, in Atlanta, Teixeira finished 10th in the 4×200-metre freestyle, and 32nd in the 100-metre butterfly.
