= Denislav Kalchev =

Bulgarian swimmer

Personal information
- Full name: Denislav Kharalamiev Kalchev
- Born: 1 July 1973 (age 52) Silistra, Bulgaria
- Height: 187 cm (6 ft 2 in)
- Weight: 82 kg (181 lb)
Medal record
Men's swimming
Representing Bulgaria
European Championships (SC)
Gold medal – first place	1994 Stavanger	100 m medley
Bronze medal – third place	1996 Rostock	100 m butterfly

Denislav Kharalamiev Kalchev (Bulgarian: Денислав Хараламиев Калчев, born 1 July 1973 in Silistra) is a retired butterfly and medley swimmer from Bulgaria. He was a member of the Bulgarian National Swimming Team (four men and one woman) at the 1992 Summer Olympics in Barcelona, Spain, where he didn't reach the finals in his three individual starts. He also competed at the 1996 Summer Olympics in Atlanta, Georgia, US.
