= Pedro Monteiro (swimmer) =

Brazilian swimmer (born 1975)

Personal information
- Full name: Pedro Monteiro
- Born: July 22, 1975 (age 50) Rio de Janeiro, Rio de Janeiro, Brazil
- Height: 1.80 m (5 ft 11 in)
- Weight: 60 kg (130 lb)

Sport
- Sport: Swimming
- Strokes: Butterfly
Medal record
Men's swimming
Representing Brazil
Pan American Games
Bronze medal – third place	2003 Santo Domingo	200m Butterfly

Pedro Monteiro (born July 22, 1975 in Rio de Janeiro) is a butterfly swimmer from Brazil.

In 1996, Monteiro was a few hundredths of the index in the 200-metre butterfly for the 1996 Summer Olympics in Atlanta, but he did not qualify. In the end of the year, he broke his first (and only) South American record, the 200-metre butterfly in short course at José Finkel Trophy, with a time of 1:56.95.

He was at the 1997 FINA World Swimming Championships (25 m), where he finished 8th in the 200-metre butterfly final.

Participating in the 1998 World Aquatics Championships in Perth, he got the 18th place in the 200-metre butterfly, and 38th in the 100-metre butterfly.

Participating in the 2002 FINA World Swimming Championships (25 m) in Moscow, he finished 13th in the 200-metre butterfly.

At the 2002 Pan Pacific Swimming Championships in Yokohama, he finished 8th in the 200-metre butterfly, and 14th in the 100-metre butterfly.

After a period of training and study in the United States, he returned to Brazil and managed content for the 2003 World Championships and 2003 Pan Am Games.

At the 2003 World Aquatics Championships in Barcelona, Monteiro finished 18th in the 200-metre butterfly.

He won the bronze medal in the 200-metre butterfly at the 2003 Pan American Games in Santo Domingo, Dominican Republic, just behind his teammate and countryman Kaio de Almeida.
