= Massimiliano Eroli =

Italian swimmer (born 1976)

Medal record

Representing Italy

Men's swimming

Mediterranean Games
Gold medal – first place	1997 Bari	400 m individual medley

Men's lifesaving

The World Games
Silver medal – second place	2005 Duisburg	Surf race

Massimiliano Eroli (born 4 December 1976 in Rome) is an Italian former butterfly and medley swimmer who competed in the 2000 Summer Olympics.
