= Hisayoshi Tanaka =

Japanese swimmer (born 1979)

Personal information
- Born: January 13, 1979 (age 47)

Sport
- Sport: Swimming
Medal record
Representing Japan
Summer Universiade
Bronze medal – third place	2001 Beijing	200m butterfly

Hisayoshi Tanaka (田中 久喜, Tanaka Hisayoshi; born 13 January 1979) is a Japanese former swimmer who competed in the 2000 Summer Olympics.
