= Vladan Marković =

Serbian swimmer

Personal information
- National team: Yugoslavia
- Born: 20 March 1977 (age 49) Belgrade, Yugoslavia
- Height: 1.87 m (6 ft 2 in)
- Weight: 90 kg (198 lb)

Sport
- Sport: Swimming
- Strokes: Butterfly
Medal record
Men's swimming
Representing Yugoslavia
Mediterranean Games
Bronze medal – third place	1997 Bari	100 m butterfly
Bronze medal – third place	1997 Bari	200 m butterfly
Bronze medal – third place	2001 Tunis	100 m butterfly

Vladan Marković (Serbian Cyrillic: Владан Марковић; born 20 March 1977) is a Serbian swimmer. He is the president of PK Zlatni Delfin, a swimming club from Belgrade and is a University of Belgrade alumni since 2001.

Marković represented his country at three different Summer Olympics. He made his first appearance at the 1996 Summer Olympics which were held in the city of Atlanta, United States. Marković finished 28th overall at the men's 100 m butterfly with a time of 54.90. He also finished 28th overall at the men's 200 metre butterfly with a time of 2:01.80. At the 2000 Summer Olympics in Sydney, Australia, his results were very similar. Markovic could only establish a time of 2:00.02 and was eliminated after the preliminary heat in the men's 200 metre butterfly. Finally, at the 2004 Summer Olympics in Athens, Greece, his time of 2:04.77 at the men's 200 metre butterfly was only good enough for a 31st overall place.

Marković represented Serbia at the 2008 Summer Olympics in Beijing, China, which was his fourth Olympics. He gained his qualification in Cádiz, Spain, in 2007 with a time of 2:00.36 at the 200 metre butterfly.

Marković won three bronze medals at the Mediterranean Games from 1997 to 2001. Among his best results remain the 7th-place finish at the 1995 FINA Short Course World Championships in Rio de Janeiro, Brazil, and his 9th-place finish at the 2000 FINA Short Course World Championships in Athens, Greece. He has reached the semifinals six times at various European LC Championships. On top of everything, he has been crowned Balkans champion four times during his career (1996-1998-2000-2002).

He has been Serbia's butterfly national champion for the past 15 years and retains the title still to this day. Marković was selected for the best young athlete in Yugoslavia in 1995.

== See also ==
- List of swimmers

Awards
Preceded by None	(Federal Republic of Yugoslavia) The Best Young Athlete of Yugoslavia; 1995	Succeeded by Olivera Jevtić
