= Franck Esposito =

French swimmer (born 1971)

Franck Espostio
Personal information
- Nickname: Titou
- Nationality: France
- Born: 13 April 1971 (age 55) Salon-de-Provence, France
- Height: 5 ft 11 in (1.80 m)

Sport
- Sport: Swimming
- Strokes: Butterfly
- Club: CN Antibes
Medal record
Men's swimming
Representing France
Olympic Games
| Bronze medal – third place | 1992 Barcelona | 200 m butterfly |
World Championships (LC)
| Silver medal – second place | 1998 Perth | 200 m butterfly |
World Championships (SC)
| Gold medal – first place | 1993 Palma | 200 m butterfly |
European Championships (LC)
| Gold medal – first place | 1991 Athens | 200 m butterfly |
| Gold medal – first place | 1997 Seville | 200 m butterfly |
| Gold medal – first place | 1999 Istanbul | 200 m butterfly |
| Gold medal – first place | 2002 Berlin | 200 m butterfly |
| Silver medal – second place | 1993 Sheffield | 200 m butterfly |
| Silver medal – second place | 2002 Berlin | 4×100m medley |
| Silver medal – second place | 2004 Madrid | 100 m butterfly |
| Silver medal – second place | 2004 Madrid | 4×100m medley |
| Bronze medal – third place | 1997 Seville | 100 m butterfly |
European Championships (SC)
| Gold medal – first place | 2003 Dublin | 200 m butterfly |
Mediterranean Games
| Gold medal – first place | 1993 Narbonne | 200 m butterfly |
| Gold medal – first place | 1997 Bari | 100 m butterfly |
| Gold medal – first place | 1997 Bari | 200 m butterfly |
| Gold medal – first place | 2001 Tunis | 100 m butterfly |
| Gold medal – first place | 2001 Tunis | 200 m butterfly |

Franck Esposito (born 13 April 1971) is a former World Record holding, and four-time Olympic, butterfly swimmer from France. He swam for France at the 1996, 2000 and 2004 Olympics; and won the bronze medal in the 200 Butterfly at the 1992 Olympics. During his career, he set the short course World Record in the 200 fly four times.

He won a total of four European titles in long course, starting from 1991. Esposito broke the world record in the 200 m butterfly (short course) four times.

At the 1991 World Championships, he lowered the French Record in the long course 200 Fly for the first time (1:59.00). He subsequently bettered the record six more times, and as of 2013 still holds the record at 1:54.62 which he swam at the 2002 French Championships (at the time, also a European Record). He also held the French Record in the long course 100 fly from August 1993 to April 2008.

== See also ==
- Franck Esposito

Records
| Preceded by - Danyon Loader; James Hickman; Thomas Rupprath | World Record holder Men's 200m Butterfly (25m); 1 February 1992 – 6 February 1993; 26 March 1994 – 2 February 1997; 14 January 2001 – 1 December 2001; 8 December 2002 – 13 December 2008 | Succeeded by Danyon Loader; Denis Pankratov; Thomas Rupprath; Nikolay Skvortsov |
