= Marcin Kaczmarek (swimmer) =

Polish swimmer

Personal information
- Full name: Marcin Kaczmarek
- Nationality: Poland
- Born: 25 June 1977 (age 49) Pisz, Warmińsko-Mazurskie
- Height: 1.80 m (5 ft 11 in)

Sport
- Sport: Swimming
- Strokes: Butterfly
- Club: AZS-AWF Gdańsk
Medal record
Men's swimming
Representing Poland
European Championships (LC)
Bronze medal – third place	1997 Seville	4×100 m medley

Marcin Kaczmarek (born 25 June 1977 in Pisz, Warmińsko-Mazurskie) is a retired butterfly swimmer from Poland, who competed for his native country at the 2000 Summer Olympics in Sydney, Australia.

A member of AZS-AWF Gdańsk he is best known for winning the bronze medal at the 1997 European Swimming Championships in the men's 4×100 m medley relay, alongside Mariusz Siembida, Marek Krawczyk and Bartosz Kizierowski.
