= Jorge Pérez (swimmer) =

Spanish swimmer

Personal information
- Born: 24 April 1972 (age 54) Pamplona, Spain

Sport
- Sport: Swimming
- Strokes: Butterfly, medley
Medal record
Representing Spain
Mediterranean Games
Silver medal – second place	1991 Athens	200m individual medley

Jorge Pérez Salinas (born 24 April 1972 in Pamplona, Navarra) is a former butterfly and medley swimmer from Spain, who competed for his native country at two Summer Olympics: in 1992 (Barcelona, Spain) and 2000 (Sydney, Australia).
