= Aleksandar Malenko =

Macedonian swimmer

Personal information
- Full name: Александар Маленко
- Nationality: North Macedonia
- Born: January 20, 1979 (age 47) Ohrid, SR Macedonia, SFR Yugoslavia

Sport
- Sport: Swimming
- Strokes: Freestyle, butterfly and medley

Aleksandar Malenko - Turundziev (born January 20, 1979) is a retired swimmer from Macedonia. He competed for his native country at the 1996 and 2004 Summer Olympics.
