= Colin Lowth =

Irish swimmer

Personal information
- Born: October 5, 1977 (age 48) Drogheda, County Louth, Ireland

Sport
- Sport: Swimming

Colin Lowth (born October 5, 1977, in Drogheda, County Louth) is a former Irish swimmer who represented Ireland at the 2000 Olympic Games. His name is often spelt "Louth" also.

== Swimming career ==
Lowth swam for Cormorant Swimming Club who are based in Dublin. His head coach was Therese Beegan. He is known best as a great butterfly swimmer but was also a very capable freestyle swimmer. His best event was the 200m Butterfly in which he broke many Irish Records and qualified for the 2000 Olympic Games in.

== Records ==
During his swimming career he broke many Irish records in butterfly, and was known as the best 200m butterfly swimmer of his generation. His short course 200m butterfly record of 2.00.33 stood for a very long time until Donal O'Neill broke it in 2003 with a time of 1.59.70. His long course 200m Butterfly time at Junior Level has never been beaten.

- Irish Junior 200m Butterfly Record (Long Course) - 2.04.01
- Irish Senior 200m Butterfly Record (Long Course) - 2.01.96

== Sydney 2000 Olympics ==
Lowth studied business in Trinity College from 1996-2000. While in his final year in college, he quailifed for the Sydney 2000 Olympics on the 200m Butterfly. His time of 2.03.91 was disappointing as it left him 8th and last in his heat and failed to qualify him for the semi-finals. Former Irish international swimmer Nick O' Hare was critical of Lowth's swim. Lowth retired from swimming after the Olympics.
