= Péter Horváth (swimmer) =

Hungarian swimmer (born 1974)

Personal information
- Full name: Péter Horváth
- Nationality: Hungary
- Born: 30 August 1974 (age 51) Budapest, Hungary
- Height: 1.81 m (5 ft 11 in)
- Weight: 80 kg (180 lb)

Sport
- Sport: Swimming
- Strokes: Backstroke, Butterfly
- Club: Budapesti Rendészeti Sportegyesület; OTP-Sport Plusz Sportegyesület; Sport-Plusz Mahart Sportegyesület
Medal record
Men's swimming
Representing Hungary
World Championships (LC)
Bronze medal – third place	1994 Rome	4×100 m medley
Bronze medal – third place	1998 Perth	4×100 m medley
European Championships (LC)
Silver medal – second place	1993 Sheffield	4×100 m medley
Silver medal – second place	1995 Vienna	4×100 m medley
Bronze medal – third place	1991 Athens	4×100 m medley

Péter Horváth (born 30 August 1974 in Budapest) is a former swimmer from Hungary. He swam for Hungary at the:

- Olympics: 1992, 1996, 2000, 2004
- World Championships: 1994, 1998, 2003
- European Championships: 1991, 1993, 1995, 1997
