= Denys Sylantyev =

Ukrainian politician and swimmer

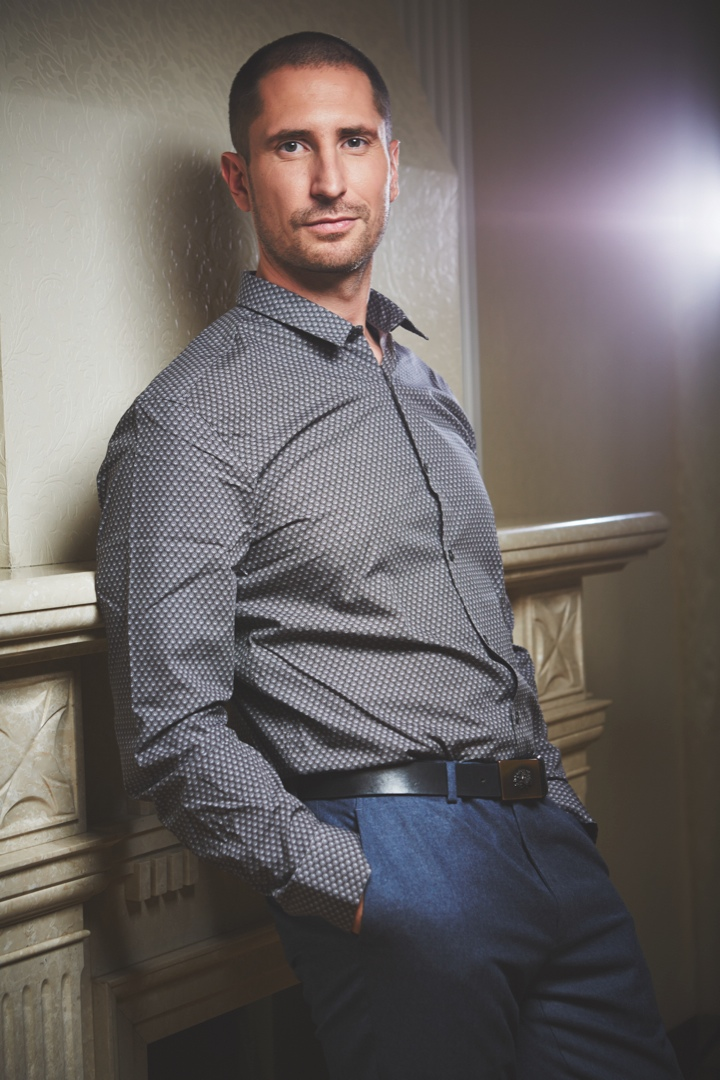
- Denys Sylantyev in 2010

Personal information
- Full name: Denys Olehovych Sylantyev
- Nationality: Ukraine
- Born: 3 October 1976 (age 49) Zaporizhzhia, Ukrainian SSR, Soviet Union
- Height: 185 cm (6 ft 1 in)
- Weight: 78 kg (172 lb)

Sport
- Sport: Swimming
- Strokes: Butterfly
- Club: Spartak, Zaporozhye; Spartak Kyiv
Medal record
Event	1st	2nd	3rd
Olympic Games	0	1	0
World Championships (LC)	1	0	0
World Championships (SC)	0	1	2
European Championships (LC)	1	5	2
European Championships (SC)	1	2	4
Universiade	2	0	0
Goodwill Games	3	0	1
European Junior Championships	0	1	0
Total	8	10	9
Men's swimming
Representing Ukraine
Olympic Games
Silver medal – second place	2000 Sydney	200 m butterfly
World Championships (LC)
Gold medal – first place	1998 Perth	200 m butterfly
World Championships (SC)
Silver medal – second place	1997 Gothenburg	200 m butterfly
Bronze medal – third place	1999 Hong Kong	200 m butterfly
Bronze medal – third place	2000 Athens	100 m butterfly
European Championships (LC)
Gold medal – first place	2004 Madrid	200 m butterfly
Silver medal – second place	1995 Vienna	100 m butterfly
Silver medal – second place	1997 Seville	100 m butterfly
Silver medal – second place	1997 Seville	200 m butterfly
Silver medal – second place	1999 Istanbul	200 m butterfly
Silver medal – second place	2002 Berlin	200 m butterfly
Bronze medal – third place	1999 Istanbul	100 m butterfly
Bronze medal – third place	2002 Berlin	100 m butterfly
European Championships (SC)
Gold medal – first place	2001 Antwerp	4×50 m freestyle
Silver medal – second place	1998 Sheffield	200 m butterfly
Silver medal – second place	2001 Antwerp	200 m butterfly
Bronze medal – third place	1998 Sheffield	100 m butterfly
Bronze medal – third place	1999 Lisbon	100 m butterfly
Bronze medal – third place	1999 Lisbon	200 m butterfly
Bronze medal – third place	2002 Riesa	4×50 m freestyle
Universiade
Gold medal – first place	1997 Catania	100 m butterfly
Gold medal – first place	1997 Catania	200 m butterfly
Goodwill Games
Gold medal – first place	1998 New York	100 m butterfly
Gold medal – first place	1998 New York	200 m butterfly
Gold medal – first place	1998 New York	Team
Bronze medal – third place	1998 New York	4x100 m medley
European Junior Championships
Silver medal – second place	1993 Istanbul	100 m butterfly

Denys Sylantyev

People's Deputy of Ukraine

8th convocation
- In office 27 November 2014 – 29 July 2019
- Constituency: Radical Party, No.12

Denys Olehovych Sylantyev (Ukrainian: Денис Олегович Силантьєв; born 3 October 1976) is a Ukrainian politician and retired swimmer. He competed at four consecutive Olympics between 1996 and 2008 and who won a silver medal in the 200 m butterfly in 2000. At the next Olympics he was the flag bearer for Ukraine.

He won the Mare Nostrum circuit three times: 2000, 2001 and 2002. In 1998 he was named European Swimmer of the Year.

Sylantyev retired from competitions shortly after the 2008 Olympics and focused on politics and development of sport in Ukraine.

In the 2012 Ukrainian parliamentary election, Silantyev was a self-nominated candidate in constituency No.217 situated in Kyiv's Obolon District but he did not win a parliamentary seat. He lost this election to Oleksandr Bryhynets of Batkivshchyna who gained 31.75% of the votes while Silantyev gained 5.18% and fourth place.

In the 26 October 2014 Ukrainian parliamentary election Sylantyev was as a candidate (placed 8th on the party list) of Radical Party was elected into the Ukrainian parliament. In the 2019 election he was placed 15th on the election list. But Radical Party lost all its parliamentary seats in the 2019 Ukrainian parliamentary election, because it gained about 1% to little to clear the 5% election threshold and also did not win an electoral district seat.

In the 2020 Kyiv local election (set for 25 October 2020) Sylantyev is a candidate for the Kyiv City Council in Obolon District for For the Future.

Awards
Preceded by Emiliano Brembilla	Swimming World's; European Swimmer of the Year; 1998	Succeeded by Pieter van den Hoogenband
Sporting positions
Preceded by Unknown	Mare Nostrum Series; Overall Winner; 2000 – 2002	Succeeded by Martina Moravcová
