= James Hickman =

British swimmer

Personal information
- Full name: James Hickman
- National team: Great Britain
- Born: 2 February 1976 (age 50) Stockport, England
- Height: 1.80 m (5 ft 11 in)
- Weight: 74 kg (163 lb; 11.7 st)

Sport
- Sport: Swimming
- Strokes: Butterfly, medley
- Club: City of Manchester Aquatics
Medal record
Event	1st	2nd	3rd
World Championships (SC)	5	4	5
European Championships (LC)	0	2	1
European Championships (SC)	5	4	4
Commonwealth Games	1	4	3
Total	11	14	13
Men's swimming
Representing Great Britain
World Championships (SC)
Gold medal – first place	1997 Gothenburg	200 m butterfly
Gold medal – first place	1999 Hong Kong	200 m butterfly
Gold medal – first place	2000 Athens	200 m butterfly
Gold medal – first place	2002 Moscow	200 m butterfly
Gold medal – first place	2004 Indianapolis	200 m butterfly
Silver medal – second place	1999 Hong Kong	200 m medley
Silver medal – second place	2000 Athens	100 m butterfly
Silver medal – second place	2000 Athens	200 m medley
Silver medal – second place	2004 Indianapolis	100 m butterfly
Bronze medal – third place	1997 Gothenburg	4×100 m medley
Bronze medal – third place	1999 Hong Kong	100 m butterfly
Bronze medal – third place	1999 Hong Kong	4×100 m medley
Bronze medal – third place	2000 Athens	100 m medley
Bronze medal – third place	2000 Athens	4×100 m medley
European Championships (LC)
Silver medal – second place	1999 Istanbul	100 m butterfly
Silver medal – second place	2000 Helsinki	200 m butterfly
Bronze medal – third place	2000 Helsinki	100 m butterfly
European Championships (SC)
Gold medal – first place	1998 Sheffield	100 m butterfly
Gold medal – first place	1998 Sheffield	200 m butterfly
Gold medal – first place	1998 Sheffield	200 m medley
Gold medal – first place	1999 Lisbon	200 m butterfly
Gold medal – first place	2001 Antwerp	200 m butterfly
Silver medal – second place	1998 Sheffield	4×50 m freestyle
Silver medal – second place	1999 Lisbon	100 m butterfly
Silver medal – second place	2001 Antwerp	4×50 m medley
Silver medal – second place	2002 Riesa	200 m butterfly
Bronze medal – third place	1998 Sheffield	100 m medley
Bronze medal – third place	1998 Sheffield	4×50 m medley
Bronze medal – third place	1999 Lisbon	4×50 m medley
Bronze medal – third place	2001 Antwerp	100 m butterfly
Representing England
Commonwealth Games
Gold medal – first place	1998 Kuala Lumpur	200 m butterfly
Silver medal – second place	1998 Kuala Lumpur	200 m medley
Silver medal – second place	1998 Kuala Lumpur	400 m medley
Silver medal – second place	1998 Kuala Lumpur	4×100 m medley
Silver medal – second place	2002 Manchester	4×100 m medley
Bronze medal – third place	1994 Victoria	200 m butterfly
Bronze medal – third place	1994 Victoria	4×100 m medley
Bronze medal – third place	2002 Manchester	200 m butterfly

James Hickman (born 2 February 1976) is a male English former competitive swimmer.

== Swimming career ==
Hickman represented Great Britain in the Olympics, FINA world championships and European championships, and England in the Commonwealth Games. He became a world champion five times on the 200 m butterfly in short course (25 m), twice world record holder, Commonwealth Champion and four times European Champion. He announced his retirement from the sport in 2004. During that year he reached the semi-final of the 100 m butterfly in the 2004 Athens Olympics, finishing with a time of 53.10 seconds. He also reached the semi-final in the 2000 Sydney Olympics finishing 6th (likewise in the 200 m butterfly). His best appearance in an Olympic final came in the 1996 Atlanta Games, where he placed 7th in the 200 m butterfly.

At the ASA National British Championships he won the 100 metres butterfly title five times in 1998, 1999, 2000, 2001 and 2002 and the 200 metres butterfly title three times in 1994, 1998 and 1999.

== Personal life ==
Hickman also owns a television and radio production company called Made in Manchester Productions. He set it up with Ashley Byrne (BBC broadcaster and former commercial radio boss) in May 2005. The company made From Bomb to Boom (about the Manchester bomb) for ITV1, Cartoon Kings presented by Sir David Jason (about animators Cosgrove and Hall) for ITV1 and Another Fine Mess for BBC Radio 2, presented by Sir Norman Wisdom (celebrating 80 years of Laurel and Hardy). Made in Manchester has also been commissioned to make a religious documentary for BBC Radio 4 which was broadcast in early 2007. They have also produced radio shows for BBC Radio Manchester in the Citizen Manchester Series, plus various other documentaries for the station. They have also produced "Jah Wobble's Mystical Musical Tour" for the BBC World Service, "Salt 'n' Pepa – Push it" for BBC Radio 1Xtra and also "Brass Britain" and a documentary about the Beach Boys for BBC Radio 2.

In 2008 Made in Manchester won the contract to deliver the PR and Communications for the FINA World Swimming Championships 2008 in the MEN Arena for which James was the Head of PR and Communications. The event was the first of its kind in a concert venue and won "Best Event Look" at the SportBusiness Awards 2008.

He currently works for Speedo International as the Global Sports Marketing Manager and manages the international sponsorships for the brand. He worked on London 2012 Olympics, 2013 FINA World Championships and 2014 Glasgow Commonwealth Games.

Hickman attended William Hulme's Grammar School and the Victoria University of Manchester.

== Achievements ==
- Short Course World 200 m butterfly champion in 1997, 1999, 2000, 2002 and 2004
- Commonwealth 200 m butterfly champion – 1998
- Short Course World record holder, 100 and 200 butterfly (short course) from 1998 to 2001
- European 200 m butterfly champion in 1999 and 2001
- Great Britain Olympic team member in 1996, 2000 and 2004

== See also ==
- List of Commonwealth Games medallists in swimming (men)
- World record progression 100 metres butterfly
- World record progression 200 metres butterfly

Records
Preceded by Michael Klim	World Record Holder; Men's 100 Butterfly (25m); 14 December 1998 – 2 September 1999	Succeeded by Michael Klim
Preceded by Denis Pankratov	World Record Holder; Men's 200 Butterfly (25m); 28 March 1998 – 14 January 2001	Succeeded by Franck Esposito
