= Mindaugas Bružas =

Lithuanian swimmer (born 1976)

Personal information
- Born: 26 June 1976 (age 50) Klaipėda, Lithuanian SSR, Soviet Union

Sport
- Sport: Swimming

Mindaugas Bružas (born 26 June 1976) is a Lithuanian butterfly swimmer. He competed in three events at the 1996 Summer Olympics.
