= Denis Pankratov =

Russian swimmer

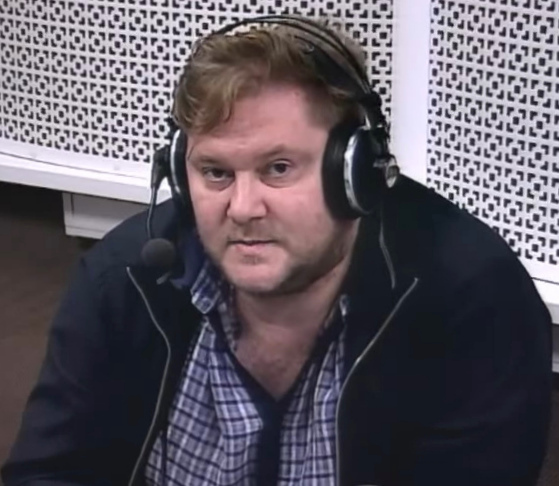
- Pankratov in 2015

Personal information
- Full name: Денис Панкратов
- Nationality: Russia
- Born: 4 July 1974 (age 52) Volgograd, Russian SFSR, Soviet Union
- Height: 1.87 m (6 ft 2 in)
- Weight: 81 kg (179 lb)

Sport
- Sport: Swimming
- Strokes: Butterfly
- Club: Central Sport Klub Army, Volgograd
- Coach: Viktor Avdienko
Medal record
Men's swimming
Representing Russia
Olympic Games
Gold medal – first place	1996 Atlanta	100 m butterfly
Gold medal – first place	1996 Atlanta	200 m butterfly
Silver medal – second place	1996 Atlanta	4x100 m medley
World Championships (LC)
Gold medal – first place	1994 Rome	200 m butterfly
Silver medal – second place	1994 Rome	4×100 m medley
Silver medal – second place	1994 Rome	4×200 m freestyle
Bronze medal – third place	1994 Rome	100 m butterfly
World Championships (SC)
Silver medal – second place	1997 Gothenburg	4×100 m medley
European Championships (LC)
Gold medal – first place	1993 Sheffield	200 m butterfly
Gold medal – first place	1993 Sheffield	4×100 m medley
Gold medal – first place	1995 Vienna	100 m butterfly
Gold medal – first place	1995 Vienna	200 m butterfly
Gold medal – first place	1995 Vienna	4×100 m medley
Silver medal – second place	1993 Sheffield	100 m butterfly

Denis Pankratov (Russian: Денис Панкратов; born 4 July 1974) is a retired Russian butterfly swimmer of the 1990s, who was best known for winning the butterfly double at the 1996 Summer Olympics in Atlanta, United States in a unique style. His 100 m butterfly triumph is particularly remembered for his swimming over 25 m of the first lap underwater and then 15 m in the opposite direction, also underwater. Two-time "Swimming World" Swimmer of the Year. In 2004 he was inducted into the International Swimming Hall of Fame (ISHOF). He trained at the Volgograd club with fellow individual gold medallist at "Swimming World" Swimmer of the Year Yevgeny Sadovyi.

== Biography ==
Pankratov was born in Volgograd, Soviet Union.

At the age of 16, in 1990 and again in 1991, he won the Junior European Championships in the butterfly. In his first international appearance at senior level, he placed 6th in the final of the 200 m butterfly at the 1992 Summer Olympics in Barcelona. In 1993, at the European Championships in Sheffield, Pankratov won his first international medals, with gold medals in the 200 m butterfly and 4×100 m medley relay and a silver medal in the 100 m butterfly. He repeated this performance in the 1995 European Championships in Vienna, this time winning all three gold medals and breaking Pablo Morales's nine-year-old 100 m butterfly world record with a time of 52.32. He held the 100 m butterfly world record for over two years, until it was broken by Michael Klim.

At the 1994 World Championships in Rome, Pankratov swam head-to-head with all the best swimmers of the world. He won the 200 m butterfly, placed second in the 4×100 m medley relay and third in the 100 m butterfly. This competition established Pankratov as the leading butterflier in the world and two years later in Atlanta, at the 1996 Summer Olympics, he won two gold medals, one each in the 100 m and 200 m butterfly and a silver medal in the 4×100 m medley with his Russian teammates. His 100 m butterfly victory was another world record of 52.27 s, breaking his own record set the previous year. Uniquely, he won the 100 m butterfly by swimming more than 25 m of the first lap underwater and then 15 m in the opposite direction, also underwater. His submarine technique caused a rule change to restrict butterfly swimmers to 15 m underwater (humans swim slower than the speed which they gain from diving and gliding and bouncing off the walls), in line with the other strokes.

Pankratov attempted to repeat his success at the 2000 Summer Olympics in Sydney and finished 7th in the 200 m butterfly. He retired in 2002. In total, he set seven world records, three long course and four short course. His two long course 100 m butterfly world records stood for two years until broken in 1997, and his 200 m butterfly world record of 1:55.22 lasted five years before broken by Tom Malchow of the United States. His short course world records included two in the 100 m butterfly and one each in the 50 m and 200 m butterfly, set in 1997. He was named as the male World Swimmer of the Year by Swimming World magazine in 1995 and 1996 and was named as the male European Swimmer of the Year in the same years.

== See also ==
- List of members of the International Swimming Hall of Fame
- List of Swimming World Swimmers of the Year
- World record progression 50 metres butterfly
- World record progression 100 metres butterfly
- World record progression 200 metres butterfly

Records
Preceded by (United States) Pablo Morales	Men's 100 metre butterfly world record holder (long course); 23 August 1995 – 9 October 1997	Succeeded by (Australia) Michael Klim
Preceded by (United States) Melvin Stewart	Men's 200 metre butterfly world record holder (long course); 14 June 1995 – 17 June 2000	Succeeded by (United States) Tom Malchow
Preceded by None	Men's 100 metre butterfly world record holder (short course); 5 February 1997 – 22 January 1998	Succeeded by (Australia) Michael Klim
Preceded by (France) Franck Esposito	Men's 200 metre butterfly world record holder (short course); 2 February 1997 – 28 March 1998	Succeeded by (United Kingdom) James Hickman
Awards
Preceded by (Australia) Kieren Perkins	World Swimmer of the Year; 1995-1996	Succeeded by (Australia) Michael Klim
Preceded by (Russia) Alexander Popov	European Swimmer of the Year; 1995 – 1996	Succeeded by (Italy) Emiliano Brembilla
