= Thomas Rupprath =

German swimmer (born 1977)

Personal information
- Nationality: Germany
- Born: 16 March 1977 (age 49) Neuss am Rhein, Nordrhein-Westfalen, West Germany
- Height: 1.82 m (6 ft 0 in)
- Weight: 78 kg (172 lb)

Sport
- Sport: Swimming
- Strokes: Backstroke and butterfly
- Club: SG Bayer Wuppertal
Medal record
Men's swimming
Representing Germany
Event	1st	2nd	3rd
Olympic Games	0	1	1
World Championships (LC)	1	3	0
World Championships (SC)	1	3	1
European Championships (LC)	2	4	1
European Championships (SC)	26	11	4
Total	30	22	7
Olympic Games
Silver medal – second place	2004 Athens	4×100 m medley
Bronze medal – third place	2000 Sydney	4×100 m medley
World Championships (LC)
Gold medal – first place	2003 Barcelona	50 m backstroke
Silver medal – second place	2001 Fukuoka	50 m backstroke
Silver medal – second place	2001 Fukuoka	4×100 m medley
Silver medal – second place	2007 Melbourne	50 m backstroke
World Championships (SC)
Gold medal – first place	2004 Indianapolis	50 m backstroke
Silver medal – second place	2000 Athens	4×100 m medley
Silver medal – second place	2004 Indianapolis	100 m medley
Silver medal – second place	2006 Shanghai	50 m backstroke
Bronze medal – third place	2004 Indianapolis	100 m backstroke
European Championships (LC)
Gold medal – first place	2002 Berlin	50 m backstroke
Gold medal – first place	2002 Berlin	100 m butterfly
Silver medal – second place	1997 Seville	4×100 m medley
Silver medal – second place	1999 Istanbul	50 m backstroke
Silver medal – second place	2000 Helsinki	100 m butterfly
Silver medal – second place	2002 Berlin	50 m butterfly
Bronze medal – third place	2002 Berlin	4×100 m medley
European Championships (SC)
Gold medal – first place	1996 Rostock	100 m butterfly
Gold medal – first place	1998 Sheffield	50 m backstroke
Gold medal – first place	1998 Sheffield	4×50 m medley
Gold medal – first place	2000 Valencia	100 m butterfly
Gold medal – first place	2000 Valencia	200 m butterfly
Gold medal – first place	2000 Valencia	4×50 m medley
Gold medal – first place	2001 Antwerp	100 m backstroke
Gold medal – first place	2001 Antwerp	100 m butterfly
Gold medal – first place	2001 Antwerp	4×50 m medley
Gold medal – first place	2002 Riesa	50 m backstroke
Gold medal – first place	2002 Riesa	100 m backstroke
Gold medal – first place	2002 Riesa	100 m butterfly
Gold medal – first place	2002 Riesa	4×50 m medley
Gold medal – first place	2003 Dublin	50 m backstroke
Gold medal – first place	2003 Dublin	100 m backstroke
Gold medal – first place	2003 Dublin	4×50 m medley
Gold medal – first place	2004 Vienna	50 m backstroke
Gold medal – first place	2004 Vienna	100 m backstroke
Gold medal – first place	2004 Vienna	100 m butterfly
Gold medal – first place	2004 Vienna	4×50 m medley
Gold medal – first place	2005 Trieste	50 m backstroke
Gold medal – first place	2005 Trieste	100 m butterfly
Gold medal – first place	2005 Trieste	4×50 m medley
Gold medal – first place	2006 Helsinki	4×50 m medley
Gold medal – first place	2007 Debrecen	50 m backstroke
Gold medal – first place	2007 Debrecen	4×50 m medley
Silver medal – second place	1996 Rostock	200 m butterfly
Silver medal – second place	1999 Lisboa	200 m butterfly
Silver medal – second place	1999 Lisboa	4×50 m medley
Silver medal – second place	2003 Dublin	100 m butterfly
Silver medal – second place	2004 Vienna	4×50 m freestyle
Silver medal – second place	2006 Helsinki	50 m backstroke
Silver medal – second place	2006 Helsinki	50 m butterfly
Silver medal – second place	2007 Debrecen	100 m medley
Silver medal – second place	2008 Rijeka	4×50 m medley
Silver medal – second place	2009 Istanbul	50 m backstroke
Silver medal – second place	2009 Istanbul	4×50 m medley
Bronze medal – third place	1998 Sheffield	200 m butterfly
Bronze medal – third place	2005 Trieste	100 m backstroke
Bronze medal – third place	2006 Helsinki	100 m backstroke
Bronze medal – third place	2007 Debrecen	4×50 m freestyle

Thomas Rupprath (born 16 March 1977 in Neuss) is an Olympic swimmer from Germany, who is nicknamed "The New Albatross".

== Biography ==
He held the world record for the 50 m backstroke (short course) with a time of 23.27 seconds set on 31 November 2002. This was broken by Robert Hurley of Australia on 26 October 2008. He also held the 50 m backstroke (long course) record between 7 July 2003 to 2 April 2008 with a time of 24.80 s.

With a time of 54.16 over 100 m backstroke (second behind Helge Meeuw) Thomas Rupprath managed to qualify for the Olympic Games in Beijing. He also won the 100 m butterfly at the German trials.

== Achievements ==
Olympic Games

- Bronze medal in 2000 Sydney
- Silver medal in 2004 Athens

World championships

- Silver medal at 2007 Melbourne

World Championships SC

- Gold medal at 2004 Indianapolis
- Silver medal at 2000 Athens
- Silver medal at 2006 Shanghai

== See also ==
- List of German records in swimming
- World record progression 50 metres backstroke
- World record progression 100 metres backstroke

Records
Preceded by Lenny Krayzelburg	World Record Holder; Men's 50 Backstroke; 26 July 2003 – 2 April 2008	Succeeded by Liam Tancock
Preceded by Lars Frölander	World Record Holder; Men's 100 Butterfly (25m); 14 December 2001 – 12 December 2003	Succeeded by Milorad Čavić
Preceded by Franck Esposito	World Record Holder; Men's 200 Butterfly (25m); 1 December 2001 – 8 December 2002	Succeeded by Franck Esposito
Preceded by Peter Mankoč	World Record Holder; Men's 100 Individual Medley (25m); 25 January 2003 – 18 January 2005	Succeeded by Roland Schoeman

Sporting positions
Preceded by Ed Moses	FINA World Cup overall male winner 2002/2003	Succeeded by Ed Moses
