= Georgios Popotas =

Greek swimmer

Personal information
- Born: 4 July 1977 (age 49)

Sport
- Sport: Swimming

Georgios Popotas (born 4 July 1977) is a Greek swimmer. He competed in two events at the 1996 Summer Olympics.
