= Chris-Carol Bremer =

German swimmer

Personal information
- Born: 5 January 1971 (age 55) Hannover, West Germany
Medal record
Representing Germany
Men's swimming
World Championships (LC)
Bronze medal – third place	1994 Rome	200 m butterfly
World Championships (SC)
Silver medal – second place	1993 Palma	4×200 m freestyle
Silver medal – second place	1995 Rio de Janeiro	4×200 m freestyle
Bronze medal – third place	1995 Rio de Janeiro	200 m butterfly
European Championships (LC)
Bronze medal – third place	1993 Sheffield	200 m butterfly
Bronze medal – third place	1995 Vienna	200 m butterfly
European Championships (SC)
Gold medal – first place	1996 Rostock	200 m butterfly

Chris-Carol Bremer (born 5 January 1971 in Hannover) is a former German Olympic swimmer of the 1990s who captained the German swimming team at the 2000 Summer Olympics. He also competed at the 1992 Summer Olympics and the 1996 Summer Olympics.
