= Stefan Aartsen =

Dutch swimmer (born 1975)

Personal information
- Full name: Stefan Remco Aartsen
- Nationality: Netherlands
- Born: 13 March 1975 (age 51) 's-Gravenzande, Netherlands
- Height: 1.94 m (6 ft 4 in).
- Weight: 78 kg (172 lb).

Sport
- Sport: Swimming
Medal record
Men's swimming
Representing the Netherlands
European Championships (LC)
Gold medal – first place	1999 Istanbul	4×100 m medley
European Championships (SC)
Gold medal – first place	1998 Sheffield	4×50 m freestyle

Stefan Remco Aartsen (born 13 March 1975 in 's-Gravenzande) is a former butterfly swimmer from the Netherlands, who twice competed for his native country at the Summer Olympics: in 1996 and 2000.

== Career ==
Aartsen first gained attention in 1992, when he won the title in the 200 m freestyle at the European Junior Championships in Leeds. In 1998 he was a member of the Dutch winning relay team (4×50 m freestyle) at the European Short Course Swimming Championships 1998 in Sheffield. A year later he won the gold medal in the 4×100 m medley relay at the European LC Championships 1999 in Istanbul, Turkey, alongside Klaas-Erik Zwering, Marcel Wouda and Pieter van den Hoogenband. After missing the 2004 Summer Olympics he retired in the spring of 2005.
