= Vesa Hanski =

Finnish swimmer

Personal information
- Full name: Vesa Juhani Hanski
- Nationality: Finland
- Born: September 13, 1973 (age 52) Turku, Finland
- Height: 1.85 m (6 ft 1 in)
- Weight: 78 kg (172 lb)

Sport
- Sport: Swimming
- Strokes: Butterfly, freestyle
- Club: Åbo Simklubb

Vesa Hanski (born September 13, 1973 in Turku) is a retired male butterfly and freestyle swimmer from Finland, who competed in two consecutive Summer Olympics for his native country, starting in 1992.
