= Swimming at the 1994 World Aquatics Championships – Women's 100 metre freestyle =

Women's 100 metre freestyle at the 1994 FINA World Championships
- Dates: 5 September 1994 (heats); 6 September 1994 (final B); 6 September 1994 (final A)
- Competitors: 56
- Winning time: 54.01 seconds

Medalists
gold medal	Le Jingyi	China
silver medal	Lü Bin	China
bronze medal	Franziska van Almsick	Germany

The women's 100 metre freestyle event at the 1994 World Aquatics Championships took place 5 September and 6 September .

== Results ==
=== Heats ===
The heats were held on 5 September.

Rank	Swimmer	Nation	Time	Notes
1	Le Jingyi	China	55.38	
2	Lü Bin	China	55.54	
3	Jenny Thompson	United States	55.56	
4	Mette Jacobsen	Denmark	55.82	
5	Franziska van Almsick	Germany	55.96	
6	Angel Martino	United States	56.15	
7	Suzu Chiba	Japan	56.25	
8	Karen Pickering	United Kingdom	56.27	
9	Natalya Meshcheryakova	Russia	56.35	
10	Sumika Minamoto	Japan	56.48	
11	Katrin Meissner	Germany	56.73	
12	Claudia Poll	Costa Rica	56.92	
13	Luminița Dobrescu	Romania	57.06	
14	Louise Jöhncke	Sweden	57.15	
15	Marianne Limpert	Canada	57.2	
16	Susie O'Neill	Australia	57.24	
17	Claudia Franco	Spain	57.28	
18	Karin Brienesse	Netherlands	57.29	
19	Martina Moravcová	Slovakia	57.31	
20	Sue Rolph	United Kingdom	57.47	
21	Rania Elwani	Egypt	57.51	
22	Shannon Shakespeare	Canada	57.51	
23	Karen Vanwirdum	Australia	57.53	
24	Lorena Diaconescu	Romania	57.72	
25	Judith Draxler	Austria	57.8	
26	Ellenor Svensson	Sweden	57.89	
27	Gyöngyvér Lakos	Hungary	58.05	
28	Tatyana Litovchenko	Russia	58.15	
29	Dominique Diezi	Switzerland	58.24	
30	Pascale Verbauwen	Belgium	58.35	
31	Julie Blaise	France	58.43	
32	María Virginia Garrone	Argentina	58.53	
33	Laura Petrutytė	Lithuania	58.55	
34	Monica Dahl	Namibia	58.64	
35	Marianne Kriel	South Africa	58.67	
36	Fu-Jen Kuo	Chinese Taipei	58.76	
37	Dita Želvienė	Lithuania	58.77	
38	Ana Alegria	Portugal	58.92	
39	Amanda Hunter-Beckinsall	South Africa	59.45	
40	Andrea Quadri	Switzerland	59.5	
41	Yevgeniya Yermakova	Kazakhstan	59.68	
42	Eileen Coparropa	Panama	59.83	
43	Joscelin Yeo	Singapore	59.89	
44	Siobhan Cropper	Trinidad and Tobago	1:00.39	
45	Teresa Moodie	Zimbabwe	1:00.46	
46	Tsai Shu-min	Chinese Taipei	1:00.77	
47	Romina Cannoni	Chile	1:01.16	
48	Natalia Scapinello	Argentina	1:01.59	
49	Jovanka Dimovska	North Macedonia	1:01.75	
50	Duška Radan	Yugoslavia	1:01.83	
51	Maritza Chiaway	Peru	1:02.00	
52	Anita Kruger	Namibia	1:02.60	
53	Wai Manlam	Macau	1:02.91	
54	Ghislane Miraly	Morocco	1:03.21	
55	Sara Casadei	San Marino	1:04.68	
56	Weng Keikou	Macau	1:07.35	

=== Finals ===
==== Final B ====
The final B was held on 6 September.

Rank	Name	Nationality	Time	Notes
9	Natalya Meshcheryakova	Russia	55.64	
10	Sumika Minamoto	Japan	56.52	
11	Claudia Franco	Spain	56.78	
12	Luminița Dobrescu	Romania	56.79	
13	Susie O'Neill	Australia	56.82	
14	Katrin Meissner	Germany	56.93	
15	Marianne Limpert	Canada	57.17	
16	Louise Jöhncke	Sweden	57.22	

==== Final A ====
The final A was held on 6 September.

Rank	Name	Nationality	Time	Notes
1st place, gold medalist(s)	Le Jingyi	China	54.01	WR
2nd place, silver medalist(s)	Lü Bin	China	54.15	
3rd place, bronze medalist(s)	Franziska van Almsick	Germany	54.77	
4	Jenny Thompson	United States	55.16	
5	Mette Jacobsen	Denmark	55.57	
6	Angel Martino	United States	55.77	
7	Suzu Chiba	Japan	55.79	
7	Karen Pickering	United Kingdom	55.79	
