= 1993 FINA World Swimming Championships (25 m) – Women's 50 metre freestyle =

These are the official results of the Women's 50 metres Freestyle event at the 1993 FINA Short Course World Championships held on 3 December 1993 in Palma de Mallorca, Spain.

== Finals ==
RANK	FINAL A	TIME
	Le Jingyi (CHN)	24.23 WR
	Angel Martino (USA)	24.93
	Linda Olofsson (SWE)	25.21
4.	Shannon Shakespeare (CAN)	25.25
5.	Shan Ying (CHN)	25.29
6.	Yevgeniya Yermakova (KAZ)	25.43
7.	Marianne Muis (NED)	25.70
8.	Marianne Kriel (RSA)	25.80

== Qualifying heats ==
RANK	HEATS RANKING	TIME
1.	Le Jingyi (CHN)	24.62 WR
2.	Angel Martino (USA)	25.04
3.	Shannon Shakespeare (CAN)	25.31
4.	Shan Ying (CHN)	25.50
5.	Linda Olofsson (SWE)	25.54
6.	Yevgeniya Yermakova (KAZ)	25.72
7.	Marianne Muis (NED)	25.93
7.	Marianne Kriel (RSA)	25.93

== See also ==
- 1992 Women's Olympic Games 50m Freestyle
- 1993 Women's European LC Championships 50m Freestyle
