= 1993 FINA World Swimming Championships (25 m) – Women's 100 metre freestyle =

These are the official results of the Women's 100 metres Freestyle event at the 1993 FINA Short Course World Championships held on the first day of the competition, on 2 December 1993 in Palma de Mallorca, Spain.

== Finals ==
RANK	FINAL A	TIME
	Le Jingyi (CHN)	53.01 WR
	Angel Martino (USA)	53.39
	Karen Pickering (GBR)	54.39
4.	Martina Moravcová (SVK)	54.52
5.	Shannon Shakespeare (CAN)	54.91
6.	Lü Bin (CHN)	55.02
7.	Marianne Muis (NED)	55.08
8.	Yevgeniya Yermakova (KAZ)	55.67

== Qualifying heats ==
RANK	HEATS RANKING	TIME
1.	Le Jingyi (CHN)	54.16
2.	Karen Pickering (GBR)	54.68
3.	Angel Martino (USA)	54.70
4.	Shannon Shakespeare (CAN)	55.01
5.	Martina Moravcová (SVK)	55.09
6.	Marianne Muis (NED)	55.18
7.	Lü Bin (CHN)	55.59
8.	Yevgeniya Yermakova (KAZ)	56.43

== See also ==
- 1992 Women's Olympic Games 100m Freestyle
- 1993 Women's European LC Championships 100m Freestyle
