= Swimming at the 1996 Summer Olympics – Women's 100 metre freestyle =

Women's 100 metre freestyle at the Games of the XXVI Olympiad
- Venue: Georgia Tech Aquatic Center
- Date: 20 July 1996 (heats & finals)
- Competitors: 48 from 44 nations
- Winning time: 54.50 OR

Medalists
1st place, gold medalist(s)		Le Jingyi	China
2nd place, silver medalist(s)		Sandra Völker	Germany
3rd place, bronze medalist(s)		Angel Martino	United States

The women's 100 metre freestyle event at the 1996 Summer Olympics took place on 20 July at the Georgia Tech Aquatic Center in Atlanta, United States.

== Records ==
Prior to this competition, the existing world and Olympic records were as follows:

World record	Le Jingyi (CHN)	54.01	Rome, Italy	5 September 1994
Olympic record	Zhuang Yong (CHN)	54.51	Barcelona, Spain	28 July 1992

The following records were established during the competition:

Date	Round	Name	Nationality	Time	Record
20 July	Final A	Le Jingyi	China	54.50	OR

== Results ==
=== Heats ===
Rule: The eight fastest swimmers advance to final A (Q), while the next eight to final B (q).

Rank	Heat	Lane	Name	Nationality	Time	Notes
1	5	4	Le Jingyi	China	54.90	Q
2	6	3	Angel Martino	United States	55.44	Q
3	4	4	Sandra Völker	Germany	55.55	Q
4	6	5	Franziska van Almsick	Germany	55.80	Q
5	5	5	Karin Brienesse	Netherlands	55.81	Q
6	4	5	Amy Van Dyken	United States	55.94	Q
7	6	6	Mette Jacobsen	Denmark	56.06	Q
8	5	2	Sarah Ryan	Australia	56.07	Q
9	6	4	Shan Ying	China	56.10	q
10	6	1	Leah Martindale	Barbados	56.13	q, NR
11	6	2	Martina Moravcová	Slovakia	56.20	q
12	4	6	Luminița Dobrescu	Romania	56.27	q
13	5	2	Natalya Meshcheryakova	Russia	56.33	q
14	5	3	Karen Pickering	Great Britain	56.40	q
15	6	7	Linda Olofsson	Sweden	56.56	q
16	4	3	Sue Rolph	Great Britain	56.62	q
17	4	7	Shannon Shakespeare	Canada	56.63	
18	6	8	Vibeke Johansen	Norway	56.88	
19	5	1	Rania Elwani	Egypt	56.89	NR
20	4	8	Solenne Figuès	France	56.90	
21	5	7	Claudia Franco	Spain	57.00	
22	3	6	Minna Salmela	Finland	57.15	
23	3	2	Gabrielle Rose	Brazil	57.16	
24	3	4	Cecilia Vianini	Italy	57.17	
25	4	2	Sumika Minamoto	Japan	57.25	
26	2	1	Siobhan Cropper	Trinidad and Tobago	57.30	NR
27	2	2	Judith Draxler	Austria	57.34	NR
28	3	7	Metka Sparavec	Slovenia	57.66	
29	5	8	Alison Fitch	New Zealand	57.71	
30	1	3	Anna Nyíri	Hungary	57.82	
31	2	4	Antonia Machaira	Greece	57.92	
32	3	1	Monica Dahl	Namibia	57.95	
33	3	3	Helene Muller	South Africa	57.98	
34	2	3	Kristýna Kyněrová	Czech Republic	58.03	
35	3	8	Lee Bo-eun	South Korea	58.27	
36	2	7	Sandrine Paquier	Switzerland	58.38	
37	4	1	Dita Želvienė	Lithuania	58.57	
38	1	5	Teresa Moodie	Zimbabwe	58.59	
39	2	8	Sviatlana Zhidko	Belarus	58.64	
40	2	5	Tsai Shu-min	Chinese Taipei	58.65	
41	3	5	Joscelin Yeo	Singapore	58.87	
42	2	6	Yevgeniya Yermakova	Kazakhstan	59.12	
43	1	4	Valeria Álvarez	Argentina	59.26	
44	1	7	Viktoriya Polyayeva	Kyrgyzstan	59.40	
45	1	2	Gabrijela Ujčić	Croatia	59.92	
46	1	6	Duška Radan	FR Yugoslavia	1:00.34	
47	1	1	Caroline Pickering	Fiji	1:00.51	
48	1	8	Gail Rizzo	Malta	1:02.19	

=== Finals ===
==== Final B ====
Rank	Lane	Name	Nationality	Time	Notes
9	4	Shan Ying	China	55.74	
10	1	Linda Olofsson	Sweden	55.83	
11	6	Luminița Dobrescu	Romania	55.98	
12	5	Leah Martindale	Barbados	56.03	NR
13	2	Natalya Meshcheryakova	Russia	56.17	
14	7	Karen Pickering	Great Britain	56.32	
15	3	Martina Moravcová	Slovakia	56.47	
16	8	Sue Rolph	Great Britain	56.58	

==== Final A ====
Rank	Lane	Name	Nationality	Time	Notes
1st place, gold medalist(s)	4	Le Jingyi	China	54.50	OR
2nd place, silver medalist(s)	3	Sandra Völker	Germany	54.88	
3rd place, bronze medalist(s)	5	Angel Martino	United States	54.93	
4	7	Amy Van Dyken	United States	55.11	
5	6	Franziska van Almsick	Germany	55.59	
6	8	Sarah Ryan	Australia	55.85	
7	1	Mette Jacobsen	Denmark	56.01	
8	2	Karin Brienesse	Netherlands	56.12	
