= 1993 FINA World Swimming Championships (25 m) – Women's 200 metre individual medley =

These are the official results of the Women's 200 metres Individual Medley event at the 1993 FINA Short Course World Championships held in Palma de Mallorca, Spain.

== Finals ==
RANK	FINAL A	TIME
	Allison Wagner (USA)	2:07.79 WR
	Dai Guohong (CHN)	2:09.21
	Elli Overton (AUS)	2:10.51
4.	Hitomi Maehara (JPN)	2:10.56
5.	Lü Bin (CHN)	2:12.89
6.	Jacqueline McKenzie (AUS)	2:13.42
7.	Martina Moravcová (SVK)	2:14.50
8.	Silvia Parera (ESP)	2:14.65

== Qualifying heats ==
RANK	HEATS RANKING	TIME
1.	Elli Overton (AUS)	2:12.34
2.	Dai Guohong (CHN)	2:12.61
3.	Hitomi Maehara (JPN)	2:13.50
4.	Jacqueline McKenzie (AUS)	2:13.57
5.	Lü Bin (CHN)	2:13.59
6.	Allison Wagner (USA)	2:14.12
7.	Martina Moravcová (SVK)	2:14.63
8.	Silvia Parera (ESP)	2:14.99

== See also ==
- 1992 Women's Olympic Games 200m Medley
- 1993 Women's European LC Championships 200m Medley
