= 1993 FINA World Swimming Championships (25 m) – Women's 400 metre individual medley =

These are the official results of the Women's 400 metres Individual Medley event at the 1993 FINA Short Course World Championships held in Palma de Mallorca, Spain.

== Finals ==
RANK	FINAL A	TIME
	Dai Guohong (CHN)	4:29.00 WR
	Allison Wagner (USA)	4:31.76
	Julie Majer (AUS)	4:37.50
4.	Trina Jackson (USA)	4:38.16
5.	Jacqueline McKenzie (AUS)	4:39.31
6.	Silvia Parera (ESP)	4:41.37
7.	Joanne Malar (CAN)	4:42.15
8.	Hitomi Maehara (JPN)	4:42.25

== Qualifying heats ==
RANK	HEATS RANKING	TIME
1.	Allison Wagner (USA)	4:35.28
2.	Dai Guohong (CHN)	4:35.50
3.	Trina Jackson (USA)	4:39.88
4.	Julie Majer (AUS)	4:41.08
5.	Jacqueline McKenzie (AUS)	4:41.40
6.	Hitomi Maehara (JPN)	4:41.43
7.	Silvia Parera (ESP)	4:41.47
8.	Joanne Malar (CAN)	4:43.05

== See also ==
- 1992 Women's Olympic Games 400m Medley
- 1993 Women's European LC Championships 400m Medley
