= Swimming at the 1992 Summer Olympics – Women's 50 metre freestyle =

Women's 50 metre freestyle at the Games of the XXV Olympiad
- Venue: Piscines Bernat Picornell
- Date: 31 July 1992 (heats & finals)
- Competitors: 50 from 35 nations
- Winning time: 24.79 WR

Medalists
1st place, gold medalist(s)		Yang Wenyi	China
2nd place, silver medalist(s)		Zhuang Yong	China
3rd place, bronze medalist(s)		Angel Martino	United States

The women's 50 metre freestyle event at the 1992 Summer Olympics took place on 31 July at the Piscines Bernat Picornell in Barcelona, Spain.

== Records ==
Prior to this competition, the existing world and Olympic records were as follows.

World record	Yang Wenyi (CHN)	24.98	Guangzhou, China	11 April 1988
Olympic record	Kristin Otto (GDR)	25.49	Seoul, South Korea	25 September 1988

The following records were established during the competition:

Date	Round	Name	Nationality	Time	Record
31 July	Final A	Yang Wenyi	China	24.79	WR

== Results ==
=== Heats ===
Rule: The eight fastest swimmers advance to final A (Q), while the next eight to final B (q).

Rank	Heat	Lane	Name	Nationality	Time	Notes
1	6	5	Zhuang Yong	China	25.56	Q
2	5	4	Angel Martino	United States	25.63	Q
2	7	4	Jenny Thompson	United States	25.63	Q
4	5	3	Catherine Plewinski	France	25.78	Q
5	6	4	Simone Osygus	Germany	25.79	Q
6	7	5	Yang Wenyi	China	25.84	Q
7	5	5	Inge de Bruijn	Netherlands	25.86	Q
8	5	2	Natalya Meshcheryakova	Unified Team	25.89	Q
9	7	3	Franziska van Almsick	Germany	25.96	q
10	5	6	Marianne Kriel	South Africa	26.05	q
11	6	3	Lisa Curry	Australia	26.07	q
12	7	6	Andrea Nugent	Canada	26.29	q
13	5	8	Kristin Topham	Canada	26.32	q
14	6	2	Linda Olofsson	Sweden	26.43	q
14	7	8	Marianne Muis	Netherlands	26.43	q
16	6	7	Yevgeniya Yermakova	Unified Team	26.45	q
17	6	8	Julie Blaise	France	26.48	
18	7	2	Gitta Jensen	Denmark	26.54	
19	6	1	Cristina Chiuso	Italy	26.72	
20	5	1	Ayako Nakano	Japan	26.74	
21	4	5	Luminița Dobrescu	Romania	26.76	
21	4	3	Claudia Franco	Spain	26.76	
23	5	7	Louise Karlsson	Sweden	26.77	
24	4	4	Karen Pickering	Great Britain	26.78	
25	4	6	Mette Nielsen	Denmark	26.80	
25	6	6	Karen van Wirdum	Australia	26.80	
27	7	7	Toni Jeffs	New Zealand	26.90	
27	7	1	Alison Sheppard	Great Britain	26.90	
29	4	7	Martina Moravcová	Czechoslovakia	26.92	
30	4	2	Diana Ureche	Romania	26.96	
31	3	3	Minna Salmela	Finland	27.00	
32	3	6	Rania Elwani	Egypt	27.20	
33	3	4	Eva Gysling	Switzerland	27.21	
34	2	4	Joscelin Yeo	Singapore	27.36	
34	3	5	Shina Matsudo	Japan	27.36	
36	3	2	Robyn Lamsam	Hong Kong	27.40	
37	3	7	Monica Dahl	Namibia	27.45	
38	2	5	Marja Pärssinen	Finland	27.49	
39	3	1	Joshua Ikhaghomi	Nigeria	27.53	
40	2	7	Shelley Cramer	Virgin Islands	27.84	NR
41	1	7	Keren Regal	Israel	27.93	
42	4	1	Helga Sigurðardóttir	Iceland	27.94	
43	1	2	Vola Hanta Ratsifa Andrihamanana	Madagascar	28.22	
44	2	3	Ratiporn Wong	Thailand	28.42	
45	2	6	Ana Joselina Fortin	Honduras	28.59	
46	2	2	May Ooi	Singapore	28.77	
47	1	5	Sharon Pickering	Fiji	28.90	
48	1	3	Paola Peñarrieta	Bolivia	29.71	
49	1	6	Sara Casadei	San Marino	30.05	
50	1	4	Elsa Freire	Angola	30.17	

=== Finals ===
==== Final B ====
Rank	Lane	Name	Nationality	Time	Notes
9	3	Lisa Curry	Australia	25.87	
10	2	Kristin Topham	Canada	26.17	
11	7	Marianne Muis	Netherlands	26.24	
11	6	Andrea Nugent	Canada	26.24	
13	5	Marianne Kriel	South Africa	26.47	
14	8	Yevgeniya Yermakova	Unified Team	26.49	
15	1	Linda Olofsson	Sweden	26.51	
	4	Franziska van Almsick	Germany	DSQ	

==== Final A ====
Rank	Lane	Name	Nationality	Time	Notes
1st place, gold medalist(s)	7	Yang Wenyi	China	24.79	WR
2nd place, silver medalist(s)	4	Zhuang Yong	China	25.08	
3rd place, bronze medalist(s)	3	Angel Martino	United States	25.23	
4	6	Catherine Plewinski	France	25.36	NR
5	5	Jenny Thompson	United States	25.37	
6	8	Natalya Meshcheryakova	Unified Team	25.47	
7	2	Simone Osygus	Germany	25.74	
8	1	Inge de Bruijn	Netherlands	25.84	
