= Dai Guohong =

Chinese swimmer (born 1977)

Personal information
- Nationality: China
- Born: 3 September 1977 (age 48) Liaoyang, Liaoning, China

Sport
- Sport: Swimming
- Strokes: Breaststroke, medley
Medal record
Women's swimming
Representing China
World Championships (LC)
Gold medal – first place	1994 Rome	400 m medley
Gold medal – first place	1994 Rome	4×100 m medley
Silver medal – second place	1994 Rome	100 m breaststroke
World Championships (SC)
Gold medal – first place	1993 Palma	100 m breaststroke
Gold medal – first place	1993 Palma	200 m breaststroke
Gold medal – first place	1993 Palma	400 m medley
Gold medal – first place	1993 Palma	4×100 m medley
Silver medal – second place	1993 Palma	200 m medley
Asian Games
Gold medal – first place	1994 Hiroshima	100 m breaststroke
Gold medal – first place	1994 Hiroshima	200 m medley
Gold medal – first place	1994 Hiroshima	4×100 m medley
Silver medal – second place	1994 Hiroshima	200 m breaststroke
Silver medal – second place	1994 Hiroshima	400 m medley

Dai Guohong (simplified Chinese: 戴国宏; traditional Chinese: 戴國宏; pinyin: Dài Guóhóng; born September 3, 1977, in Liaoyang, Liaoning) is a retired Chinese swimmer, who specialized in breaststroke and individual medley events. Although she had never competed in any edition of the Olympic Games, Dai held her distinction of being one of the world's top class swimmers in the early 1990s. During her sporting career, she captured more than a dozen medals in breaststroke and individual medley, and also helped the Chinese team demolish a global standard in the medley relay from the FINA World Aquatics Championships in 1994.

In 1993, Dai made her first international breakthrough at the first ever FINA Short Course World Championships in Palma de Mallorca, Spain, where she captured a total of five medals, four golds and one silver. Dai also established three world records each in the 100 m breaststroke (1:06.58), 200 m breaststroke (2:21.99), and 400 m individual medley (4:29.00), and teamed with He Cihong, Liu Limin, and Le Jingyi to snatch the first medley relay title in a sterling time of 3:57.73, adding it to a medal tally of ten for the Chinese team in short-course swimming.

At the 1994 World Aquatics Championships in Rome, Italy, Dai won a total of three medals, two golds and one silver. In her first event, 400 m individual medley, Dai edged out the American duo Allison Wagner and Kristine Quance on the freestyle leg to take home the gold in 4:39.14, despite her accusations over China's doping scandal. Four days later, in the 100 m breaststroke, Dai earned a silver in 1:09.26, finishing behind Australia's Samantha Riley by 1.57 seconds. She also gave her teammate Yuan Yuan a further reason to celebrate as the Chinese handed a medal lock in the pool with a two–three finish. In the 4 × 100 m medley relay, Dai, along with He Cihong, Liu Limin, and Le Jingyi, established a new world record to claim the gold medal in a sterling time of 4:01.67, slashing 0.87 seconds off the standard set by the U.S. Olympic team from the 1992 Summer Olympics in Barcelona.

When Japan hosted the Asian Games in Hiroshima by the following month, Dai added five more medals to her career hardware: three golds and two silver. In the 400 m individual medley, Dai lost her defense of capturing the title to her teammate and 1992 Olympic champion Lin Li by over five seconds, ending up only with a silver in 4:40.47. Rebounding from two losses, including 200 m breaststroke, at these Games, Dai continued to build her illustrious career with two gold medals each in the 100 m breaststroke (1:09.87), and in the 200 m individual medley (2:15.42). In the absence of Le Jingyi from the Games, Dai helped her teammates He Cihong, Liu Limin, and newcomer Shan Ying defend their medley relay title in 4:07.69, more than six seconds outside the world record.

Dai also sought a second bid to defend three of her titles for the 1995 FINA Short Course World Championships in Rio de Janeiro, Brazil, but she withdrew from the Chinese championships in Chengdu that effectively ended her swimming career. Some reports claimed that she had tested positive for performance-enhancing drugs and anabolic steroids.

== See also ==
- World record progression 400 metres individual medley
- World record progression 4 × 100 metres medley relay
- List of World Swimming Championships (25 m) medalists (women)
