= 1996 United States Olympic trials (swimming) =

1996 United States Olympic Trials (swimming)
- Host city: Indianapolis, Indiana, U.S.
- Date: March 6 – March 12
- Venue: Indiana University Natatorium
- Events: 26 (men: 13; women: 13)

The 1996 United States Olympic trials for swimming events were held from March 6 to 12 in Indianapolis, Indiana. It was the qualifying meet for American swimmers who hoped to compete at the 1996 Summer Olympics in Atlanta.

== Results ==
Key: Highlighted swimmers achieved the qualification conditions to be included in the Olympic team in that respective event.

=== Men's events ===
Event	Gold		Silver		Bronze	
50 m freestyle	Gary Hall, Jr.	22.27	David Fox	22.50	Bill Pilczuk	22.55
100 m freestyle	Jon Olsen	49.46	Gary Hall, Jr.	49.53	Josh Davis	49.97
200 m freestyle	John Piersma	1:48.97	Josh Davis	1:49.29	Ryan Berube	1:49.37
400 m freestyle	Tom Dolan	3:48.99	John Piersma	3:51.41	Peter Wright	3:52.85
1500 m freestyle	Carlton Bruner	15:12.85	Peter Wright	15:17.96	Lawrence Frostad	15:22.79
100 m backstroke	Tripp Schwenk	54.94	Jeff Rouse	55.15	Brian Retterer	55.46
200 m backstroke	Brad Bridgewater	1:59.16	Tripp Schwenk	1:59.42	Tate Blahnik	2:00.48
100 m breaststroke	Jeremy Linn	1:01.94	Kurt Grote	1:02.03	Eric Wunderlich	1:02.39
200 m breaststroke	Kurt Grote	2:14.22	Eric Wunderlich	2:14.45	Steve West	2:14.96
100 m butterfly	John Hargis	53.42	Mark Henderson	53.51	Jason Lancaster	53.73
200 m butterfly	Tom Malchow	1:57.39	Ray Carey	1:57.66	Melvin Stewart	1:57.89
200 m IM	Tom Dolan	2:00.20	Greg Burgess	2:01.55	Paul Nelsen	2:02.91
400 m IM	Tom Dolan	4:12.72	Eric Namesnik	4:17.19	Iian Mull	4:22.16

=== Women's events ===
Event	Gold		Silver		Bronze	
50 m freestyle	Amy Van Dyken	25.17	Angel Martino	25.23	Jenny Thompson	25.61
100 m freestyle	Amy Van Dyken	55.27	Angel Martino	55.39	Jenny Thompson	55.45
200 m freestyle	Cristina Teuscher	1:59.50	Trina Jackson	2:00.62	Lisa Jacob	2:00.65
400 m freestyle	Janet Evans	4:10.97	Cristina Teuscher	4:11.59	Trina Jackson	4:13.46
800 m freestyle	Brooke Bennett	8:31.41	Janet Evans	8:33.60	Trina Jackson	8:35.52
100 m backstroke	Whitney Hedgepeth	1:01.52	Beth Botsford	1:01.59	Barbara Bedford	1:02.31
200 m backstroke	Beth Botsford	2:10.66	Whitney Hedgepeth	2:12.10	Amanda Adkins	2:13.41
100 m breaststroke	Amanda Beard	1:08.36	Kristine Quance	1:09.72	Kristy Kowal	1:09.89
200 m breaststroke	Amanda Beard	2:26.25	Jilen Siroky	2:28.23	Kristine Quance	2:28.35
100 m butterfly	Angel Martino	59.63	Amy Van Dyken	59.72	Misty Hyman	59.75
200 m butterfly	Annette Salmeen	2:12.39	Trina Jackson	2:12.89	Jean Todisco	2:12.97
200 m IM	Allison Wagner	2:13.71	Kristine Quance	2:13.76	Cristina Teuscher	2:15.52
400 m IM	Allison Wagner	4:41.61	Whitney Metzler	4:46.88	Jennifer Parmenter	4:49.50

== See also ==
- United States at the 1996 Summer Olympics
- United States Olympic Trials (swimming)
- USA Swimming
