= Swimming at the 1996 Summer Olympics – Women's 200 metre individual medley =

Women's 200 metre individual medley at the Games of the XXVI Olympiad
- Venue: Georgia Tech Aquatic Center
- Date: 24 July 1996 (heats & finals)
- Competitors: 43 from 39 nations
- Winning time: 2:13.93 NR

Medalists
1st place, gold medalist(s)		Michelle Smith	Ireland
2nd place, silver medalist(s)		Marianne Limpert	Canada
3rd place, bronze medalist(s)		Lin Li	China

The women's 200 metre individual medley event at the 1996 Summer Olympics took place on 24 July at the Georgia Tech Aquatic Center in Atlanta, United States.

== Records ==
Prior to this competition, the existing world and Olympic records were as follows.

World record	Lin Li (CHN)	2:11.65	Barcelona, Spain	30 July 1992
Olympic record	Lin Li (CHN)	2:11.65	Barcelona, Spain	30 July 1992

== Results ==
=== Heats ===
Rule: The eight fastest swimmers advance to final A (Q), while the next eight to final B (q).

Rank	Heat	Lane	Name	Nationality	Time	Notes
1	4	3	Marianne Limpert	Canada	2:15.12	Q
2	6	5	Elli Overton	Australia	2:15.81	Q
3	5	3	Minouche Smit	Netherlands	2:16.30	Q
4	6	3	Lin Li	China	2:16.31	Q
5	5	4	Allison Wagner	United States	2:16.32	Q
6	4	5	Joanne Malar	Canada	2:16.34	Q
7	5	5	Michelle Smith	Ireland	2:16.35	Q
8	5	1	Louise Karlsson	Sweden	2:16.37	Q
9	4	7	Martina Moravcová	Slovakia	2:16.50	q, NR
10	6	4	Wu Yanyan	China	2:16.55	q
11	3	4	Beatrice Câșlaru	Romania	2:16.80	q
12	6	2	Emma Johnson	Australia	2:17.02	q, WD
13	4	4	Kristine Quance	United States	2:17.48	q
13	6	1	Alicja Pęczak	Poland	2:17.48	q
15	3	2	Silvia Parera	Spain	2:17.67	q
16	5	7	Sabine Herbst	Germany	2:18.00	q
17	6	6	Brigitte Becue	Belgium	2:18.28	q, WD
18	4	1	Britta Vestergaard	Denmark	2:18.35	q
19	3	8	Alenka Kejžar	Slovenia	2:18.39	NR
20	6	7	Lenka Maňhalová	Czech Republic	2:18.43	
21	5	6	Sue Rolph	Great Britain	2:18.81	
22	4	6	Gabrielle Rose	Brazil	2:18.99	
23	3	6	Aikaterini Sarakatsani	Greece	2:19.74	
24	2	5	Elin Austevoll	Norway	2:19.81	
25	4	2	Anna Wilson	New Zealand	2:19.97	
26	5	8	Darya Shmeleva	Russia	2:20.34	
27	3	7	Julia Russell	South Africa	2:20.40	
28	5	2	Fumie Kurotori	Japan	2:20.58	
29	4	8	Olena Lapunova	Ukraine	2:20.76	
30	3	5	Martina Nemec	Austria	2:21.10	
31	2	3	Carolyn Adel	Suriname	2:21.54	NR
32	6	8	Joscelin Yeo	Singapore	2:21.76	
33	2	4	Petra Chaves	Portugal	2:22.03	
34	3	1	Praphalsai Minpraphal	Thailand	2:22.34	
35	2	7	Lee Jie-hyun	South Korea	2:22.97	
36	3	3	Nadège Cliton	France	2:25.25	
37	2	1	Sonia Álvarez	Puerto Rico	2:25.57	
38	2	2	Akiko Thomson	Philippines	2:25.87	
39	1	4	Olga Bogatyreva	Kyrgyzstan	2:26.42	
40	2	6	Beáta Újhelyi	Hungary	2:26.77	
41	2	8	Tsai Shu-min	Chinese Taipei	2:28.71	
42	1	5	Meritxell Sabaté	Andorra	2:37.38	
43	1	3	Mira Ghniem	Jordan	2:56.99	

=== Finals ===
==== Final B ====
Rank	Lane	Name	Nationality	Time	Notes
9	6	Kristine Quance	United States	2:15.24	
10	5	Wu Yanyan	China	2:16.61	
11	1	Sabine Herbst	Germany	2:16.68	
12	3	Beatrice Câșlaru	Romania	2:16.75	
13	4	Martina Moravcová	Slovakia	2:17.40	
14	8	Britta Vestergaard	Denmark	2:17.95	
15	2	Alicja Pęczak	Poland	2:18.21	
16	7	Silvia Parera	Spain	2:19.92	

==== Final A ====
Rank	Lane	Name	Nationality	Time	Notes
1st place, gold medalist(s)	1	Michelle Smith	Ireland	2:13.93	NR
2nd place, silver medalist(s)	4	Marianne Limpert	Canada	2:14.35	NR
3rd place, bronze medalist(s)	6	Lin Li	China	2:14.74	
4	7	Joanne Malar	Canada	2:15.30	
5	5	Elli Overton	Australia	2:16.04	
6	2	Allison Wagner	United States	2:16.43	
7	3	Minouche Smit	Netherlands	2:16.73	
8	8	Louise Karlsson	Sweden	2:17.25	
