= 1993 FINA World Swimming Championships (25 m) – Women's 100 metre backstroke =

These are the official results of the women's 100 metres backstroke event at the 1993 FINA Short Course World Championships held in Palma de Mallorca, Spain.

== Finals ==
RANK	FINAL A	TIME
	Angel Martino (USA)	58.50 WR
	He Cihong (CHN)	1:00.13
	Elli Overton (AUS)	1:00.18
4.	Jia Yuanyuan (CHN)	1:00.19
5.	Sandra Völker (GER)	1:00.48
6.	Nina Zhivanevskaya (RUS)	1:01.14
7.	Marianne Kriel (RSA)	1:01.15
8.	Rachel Joseph (USA)	1:01.72

== Qualifying heats ==
RANK	HEATS RANKING	TIME
1.	Angel Martino (USA)	59.89
2.	He Cihong (CHN)	1:00.12
3.	Elli Overton (AUS)	1:00.60
4.	Jia Yuanyuan (CHN)	1:00.70
5.	Sandra Völker (GER)	1:00.80
6.	Marianne Kriel (RSA)	1:01.21
7.	Nina Zhivanevskaya (RUS)	1:01.50
8.	Rachel Joseph (USA)	1:02.01

== See also ==
- 1992 Women's Olympic Games 100m Backstroke
- 1993 Women's European LC Championships 100m Backstroke
