= 1993 FINA World Swimming Championships (25 m) – Women's 100 metre breaststroke =

These are the official results of the Women's 100 metres Breaststroke event at the 1993 FINA Short Course World Championships, held in Palma de Mallorca, Spain.

== Finals ==
RANK	FINAL A	TIME
	Dai Guohong (CHN)	1:06.58 WR
	Linley Frame (AUS)	1:07.65
	Samantha Riley (AUS)	1:07.77
4.	Kelli King-Bednar (USA)	1:08.28
5.	Huang Xiaolu (CHN)	1:08.35
6.	Brigitte Becue (BEL)	1:09.14
7.	Svitlana Bondarenko (UKR)	1:09.58
8.	Hanna Jaltner (SWE)	1:10.02

== Qualifying heats ==
RANK	HEATS RANKING	TIME
1.	Linley Frame (AUS)	1:07.34
2.	Dai Guohong (CHN)	1:07.41
3.	Samantha Riley (AUS)	1:08.64
4.	Kelli King-Bednar (USA)	1:08.74
5.	Huang Xiaolu (CHN)	1:08.61
6.	Brigitte Becue (BEL)	1:09.30
7.	Svitlana Bondarenko (UKR)	1:09.74
8.	Hanna Jaltner (SWE)	1:10.42

== See also ==
- 1992 Women's Olympic Games 100m Breaststroke
- 1993 Women's European LC Championships 100m Breaststroke
