= Robert Abernethy (swimmer) =

Australian swimmer (born 1971)

Personal information
- Full name: Robert James Abernethy
- Nickname: Rob
- Nationality: Australia
- Born: 1971 (age 54–55)

Sport
- Sport: Swimming
- Strokes: Freestyle
Medal record
Men's swimming
Representing Australia
World Championships (SC)
Bronze medal – third place	1993 Palma	50 m freestyle

Robert James Abernethy (born 1971) was an Australian swimmer specialising in freestyle sprint events. He is best known for winning the bronze medal at the inaugural 1993 FINA Short Course World Championships in Palma de Mallorca, Spain. He also competed for his native country at the 1995 Summer Universiade in Fukuoka, Japan.

On 23 June 2000, he was awarded the Australian Sports Medal.
