= Nick Gillingham =

British swimmer (born 1967)

Nick Gillingham MBE
Personal information
- Full name: Nicholas Gillingham
- Nickname: "Nick"
- National team: Great Britain
- Born: 22 January 1967 (age 59) Staffordshire, England
- Height: 1.83 m (6 ft 0 in)
- Weight: 72 kg (159 lb; 11.3 st)

Sport
- Sport: Swimming
- Strokes: Breaststroke
- Club: City of Birmingham SC
Medal record
Men's swimming
Representing Great Britain
Olympic Games
Silver medal – second place	1988 Seoul	200 m breaststroke
Bronze medal – third place	1992 Barcelona	200 m breaststroke
World Championships (LC)
Bronze medal – third place	1991 Perth	200 m breaststroke
World Championships (SC)
Gold medal – first place	1993 Palma	200 m breaststroke
Bronze medal – third place	1993 Palma	4×100 m medley
European Championships (LC)
Gold medal – first place	1989 Bonn	200 m breaststroke
Gold medal – first place	1991 Athens	200 m breaststroke
Gold medal – first place	1993 Sheffield	200 m breaststroke
Silver medal – second place	1993 Sheffield	100 m breaststroke
Bronze medal – third place	1989 Bonn	100 m breaststroke
Bronze medal – third place	1993 Sheffield	4×100 m medley
Representing England
Commonwealth Games
Gold medal – first place	1994 Victoria	200 m breaststroke
Silver medal – second place	1986 Edinburgh	4×100 m medley
Silver medal – second place	1994 Victoria	100 m breaststroke
Bronze medal – third place	1986 Edinburgh	200 m breaststroke
Bronze medal – third place	1990 Auckland	100 m breaststroke
Bronze medal – third place	1990 Auckland	200 m breaststroke
Bronze medal – third place	1994 Victoria	4×100 m medley

Nicholas Gillingham, MBE (born 22 January 1967) is an English former competitive swimmer, active in the 1980s and 1990s. Born in Staffordshire, he represented Great Britain in the Olympics, FINA World Championships and European Championships, as well as representing England in the Commonwealth Games. Medaling in two Olympic Games in 1988 and 1992, he was a world (short course), European and Commonwealth champion in his specialist event, the 200 metres breaststroke. His career broadly overlapped with fellow British breaststroker and Olympic 100 metre breaststroke champion, Adrian Moorhouse whose former 100 metres breaststroke world record he broke in 1992 where he topped the world rankings.

== Swimming career ==
=== Olympic Games ===
Gillingham participated in three consecutive Summer Olympics, starting in 1988. At the 1988 Summer Olympics in Seoul, he won the silver medal in the 200-metre breaststroke in a Commonwealth Record of 2:14.12 narrowly missing the World Record, followed by a bronze medal in the same event four years later swimming inside the Olympic Record at the 1992 Summer Olympics in Barcelona setting another Commonwealth Record of 2:11.29. Although better known as a 200m breaststroke swimmer, Gillingham was also a world class 100m swimmer and was ranked first in the world in 1992 with his Commonwealth Record of 1:01.33 from the British Olympic trials. However, he sustained a leg injury to his groin during the Olympics which impaired his performance in the 100m final where he finished 7th, half a second slower than his heat time.

=== Commonwealth Games ===
Gillingham won six Commonwealth Games medals; he represented England and won a bronze medal in the 200 metres breaststroke, at the 1986 Commonwealth Games in Edinburgh, Scotland. Four years later he represented England and won two bronze medals in the 100 metres and 200 metres breaststroke, at the 1990 Commonwealth Games in Auckland, New Zealand. At the 1994 Commonwealth Games he won the gold medal in the 200 metres breaststroke, the silver medal in the 100 metres breaststroke and a bronze medal in the medley relay.

=== Other ===
On 18 August 1989 in the European Championships, he swam to a World Record world record in the long-course 200-metre breaststroke in a time of 2:12.90, only to hold it for almost two days before the American Mike Barrowman, lowered the record again to 2:12.89.

A World Record holder both long course and short course. He also won the world title at the first inaugural 1993 FINA Short Course World Championships in Palma de Mallorca. He broke three world, ten European, nine Commonwealth and seventeen British records during his career and won 17 major championship medals along with multiple World Cup gold medals and the European Open gold.

He dominated the ASA National Championships in the breaststroke events, and won the 100 metres breaststroke title in 1992 and 1993 and the 200 metres breaststroke on nine occasions (1987, 1988, 1989, 1990, 1991, 1992, 1993, 1994 and 1996).

== Personal life ==
Gillingham was appointed Member of the Order of the British Empire (MBE) in the 1993 New Year Honours for services to swimming, and retired from full-time competitive sport in 1996. After retiring, he established a sports communications business focusing on sports marketing, development & events and also became an Ambassador and Mentor for multiple sports across the UK.

== See also ==
- List of Commonwealth Games medalists in swimming (men)
- List of Olympic medalists in swimming (men)
- World record progression 200 metres breaststroke
