= Hu Bin =

Chinese swimmer

Personal information
- Nationality: China
- Born: 1973 (age 52–53)

Sport
- Sport: Swimming
- Strokes: Freestyle
Medal record
Men's swimming
Representing China
World Championships (SC)
Silver medal – second place	1993 Palma	50 m freestyle

Hu Bin (born 1973) was a Chinese swimmer specialising in the freestyle sprint events. He is best known for winning the silver medal at the inaugural 1993 FINA World Swimming Championships (25 m) in Palma de Mallorca, Spain, behind Great Britain's Mark Foster.
