= 1993 FINA World Swimming Championships (25 m) – Women's 200 metre backstroke =

These are the official results of the Women's 200 metres Backstroke event at the 1993 FINA Short Course World Championships held in Palma de Mallorca, Spain.

== Finals ==
RANK	FINAL A	TIME
	He Cihong (CHN)	2:06.09 WR
	Jia Yuanyuan (CHN)	2:07.95
	Cathleen Rund (GER)	2:09.59
4.	Mette Jacobsen (DEN)	2:09.84
5.	Nina Zhivanevskaya (RUS)	2:09.86
6.	Joanne Deakins (GBR)	2:09.99
7.	Rachel Joseph (USA)	2:10.78
8.	Katharine Osher (GBR)	2:10.80

== Qualifying heats ==
RANK	HEATS RANKING	TIME
1.	Nina Zhivanevskaya (RUS)	2:09.04
2.	He Cihong (CHN)	2:09.35
3.	Jia Yuanyuan (CHN)	2:10.33
4.	Cathleen Rund (GER)	2:11.01
5.	Mette Jacobsen (DEN)	2:11.24
6.	Joanne Deakins (GBR)	2:11.36
7.	Rachel Joseph (USA)	2:11.45
8.	Katharine Osher (GBR)	2:11.68

== See also ==
- 1992 Women's Olympic Games 200m Backstroke
- 1993 Women's European LC Championships 200m Backstroke
