= Beáta Újhelyi =

Hungarian swimmer

Personal information
- Born: 1 June 1980 (age 46) Budapest, Hungary

Sport
- Sport: Swimming

Beáta Újhelyi (born 1 June 1980) is a Hungarian swimmer. She competed in the women's 200 metre individual medley event at the 1996 Summer Olympics.
