= 1995 Pan Pacific Swimming Championships =

International swimming competition

- Host city: Atlanta, Georgia, United States
- Date: August 10–13, 1995
- Nations: 26

The sixth edition of the Pan Pacific Swimming Championships, a long course (50 m) event involving countries in the Pacific region, was held in 1995 in Atlanta, Georgia, United States, from August 10–13.

The meet served as the swimming test event for the 1996 Olympics.

China was banned from these championships due to allegations of systematic doping after multiple Chinese swimmers were tested positive at the 1994 Asian Games. The Pan-Pacific charter nations voted 3 to 1 for the exclusion, with USA, Canada and Australia voting in favor and only Japan voting against.

== Competing nations ==
- Australia
- Barbados
- Bermuda
- Canada
- Colombia
- Costa Rica
- Cuba
- Ecuador
- Egypt
- Hong Kong
- Japan
- Kazakhstan
- South Korea
- Mexico
- New Zealand
- Panama
- Peru
- Philippines
- Puerto Rico
- South Africa
- Thailand
- Trinidad and Tobago
- United States
- Venezuela

== Results ==
=== Men's events ===
Event	Gold		Silver		Bronze	
50 m freestyle	Gary Hall, Jr. (USA)	22.30	David Fox (USA)	22.31	Chris Fydler (AUS)	22.64
100 m freestyle	Gary Hall, Jr. (USA)	49.47	Jon Olsen (USA)	49.56	Chris Fydler (AUS)	49.95
200 m freestyle	Danyon Loader (NZL)	1:48.72; NR	Daniel Kowalski (AUS)	1:49.14	Chad Carvin (USA)	1:49.38
400 m freestyle	Daniel Kowalski (AUS)	3:50.01	Danyon Loader (NZL)	3:50.11	Chad Carvin (USA)	3:50.47
800 m freestyle	Daniel Kowalski (AUS)	7:50.28	Kieren Perkins (AUS)	7:50.80	Glen Housman (AUS)	7:54.66
1500 m freestyle	Kieren Perkins (AUS)	14:58.92	Daniel Kowalski (AUS)	15:02.20	Carlton Bruner (USA)	15:17.13
100 m backstroke	Jeff Rouse (USA)	54.99	Tripp Schwenk (USA)	55.18	Mark Versfeld (CAN)	56.08
200 m backstroke	Tripp Schwenk (USA)	1:58.97	Tom Dolan (USA)	2:00.18	Ryuji Horii (JPN)	2:00.56
100 m breaststroke	Eric Wunderlich (USA)	1:01.80	Phil Rogers (AUS)	1:01.83	Kurt Grote (USA)	1:02.19
200 m breaststroke	Akira Hayashi (JPN)	2:13.60; AS	Eric Wunderlich (USA)	2:15.29	Phil Rogers (AUS)	2:15.32
100 m butterfly	Scott Miller (AUS)	53.07	Mark Henderson (USA)	53.69	Adam Pine (AUS)	54.02
200 m butterfly	Scott Miller (AUS)	1:57.86	Scott Goodman (AUS)	1:58.65	Matt Hooper (USA)	1:58.83
200 m individual medley	Tom Dolan (USA)	2:00.89	Matthew Dunn (AUS)	2:01.48	Curtis Myden (CAN)	2:01.80
400 m individual medley	Tom Dolan (USA)	4:14.77	Eric Namesnik (USA)	4:15.39	Matthew Dunn (AUS)	4:18.83
4×100 m freestyle relay	United States; David Fox (49.32); Joe Hudepohl (49.11); Jon Olsen (48.17); Gary Hall, Jr. (48.51)	3:15.11; WR	Australia; Chris Fydler (49.72); Darren Lange (49.92); Michael Klim (50.24); Richard Upton (49.79)	3:19.67; OC	New Zealand; John Steel (50.76); Nicholas Tongue (50.48); Trent Bray (50.02); Danyon Loader (50.26)	3:21.52; NR
4×200 m freestyle relay	Australia; Malcolm Allen (1:50.13); Glen Housman (1:48.57); Matthew Dunn (1:48.74); Daniel Kowalski (1:50.08)	7:17.52	United States; Jon Olsen (1:49.72); Chad Carvin (1:48.88); Joe Hudepohl (1:49.15); Tom Dolan (1:50.13)	7:17.88	New Zealand; Trent Bray (1:49.46); John Steel (1:54.75); Guy Callaghan (1:54.85); Danyon Loader (1:48.84)	7:27.90
4×100 m medley relay	United States; Jeff Rouse (54.58); Eric Wunderlich (1:01.67); Mark Henderson (52.84); Gary Hall, Jr. (47.95)	3:37.04	Australia; Steven Dewick (56.78); Phil Rogers (1:01.39); Scott Miller (52.51); Chris Fydler (48.94)	3:39.62; OC	Japan; Hajime Itoi (56.64); Akira Hayashi (1:01.26); Takashi Yamamoto (53.84); Yukihiro Matsushita (50.58)	3:42.32

Legend: WR – World record; CR – Championship record; AF – African record; AM – Americas record; AS – Asian record; OC – Oceanian record; NR – National record

=== Women's events ===
Event	Gold		Silver		Bronze	
50 m freestyle	Amy Van Dyken (USA)	25.03; AM	Jenny Thompson (USA)	25.38	Sumika Minamoto (JPN)	25.74
100 m freestyle	Jenny Thompson (USA)	55.31	Amy Van Dyken (USA)	56.13	Suzu Chiba (Japan)	56.17
200 m freestyle	Suzu Chiba (Japan)	2:00.00	Cristina Teuscher (USA)	2:00.38	Claudia Poll (CRC)	2:00.46
400 m freestyle	Brooke Bennett (USA)	4:10.46	Trina Jackson (USA)	4:11.04	Hayley Lewis (AUS)	4:11.26
800 m freestyle	Hayley Lewis (AUS)	8:28.78	Brooke Bennett (USA)	8:29.21	Trina Jackson (USA)	8:36.61
1500 m freestyle	Brooke Bennett (USA)	16:15.58	Hayley Lewis (AUS)	16:15.73	Stacey Gartrell (AUS)	16:34.93
100 m backstroke	Noriko Inada (JPN)	1:02.21; NR	Nicole Stevenson (AUS)	1:02.17	Mai Nakamura (JPN)	1:02.22
200 m backstroke	Nicole Stevenson (AUS)	2:11.26	Noriko Inada (JPN)	2:11.54; NR	Whitney Hedgepeth (USA)	2:11.95
100 m breaststroke	Penelope Heyns (RSA)	1:08.09; AF	Guylaine Cloutier (CAN)	1:09.48	Amanda Beard (USA)	1:09.90
200 m breaststroke	Samantha Riley (AUS)	2:24.81; CR	Penelope Heyns (RSA)	2:27.68; AF	Amanda Beard (USA)	2:28.20
100 m butterfly	Susie O'Neill (AUS)	59.58; OC	Jenny Thompson (USA)	59.83	Jessica Amey (CAN)	1:00.24; NR
200 m butterfly	Susie O'Neill (AUS)	2:07.29; OC	Mika Haruna (JPN)	2:10.88	Whitney Phelps (USA)	2:11.25
200 m individual medley	Elli Overton (AUS)	2:14.68; OC	Joanne Malar (CAN)	2:15.45	Anna Windsor (AUS)	2:16.13
400 m individual medley	Fumie Kurotori (JPN)	4:44.22	Allison Wagner (USA)	4:45.52	Elli Overton (AUS)	4:46.24
4×100 m freestyle relay	United States; Amy Van Dyken (55.76); Angel Martino (55.58); Melanie Valerio (55.55); Jenny Thompson (54.70)	3:41.59; CR	Australia; Karin Dunne (56.65); Sarah Ryan (55.21); Anna Windsor (56.25); Susie O'Neill (54.88)	3:42.99; OC	Japan; Sumika Minamoto (56.50); Naoko Imoto (56.59); Eri Yamanoi (56.81); Suzu Chiba (54.99)	3:44.89; NR
4×200 m freestyle relay	United States; Cristina Teuscher (1:59.65); Melanie Valerio (2:01.71); Trina Jackson (2:00.51); Jenny Thompson (2:00.81)	8:02.68; CR	Australia; Julia Greville (2:01.53); Emma Johnson (2:01.89); Anna Windsor (2:01.98); Susie O'Neill (1:58.35)	8:03.75; OC	Canada; Katie Brambley (2:01.46); Marianne Limpert (2:02.27); Shannon Shakespeare (2:01.74); Joanne Malar (2:02.32)	8:07.79; NR
4×100 m medley relay	Australia; Nicole Livingstone (1:01.95); Samantha Riley (1:07.19); Susie O'Neill (58.82); Sarah Ryan (54.97)	4:02.93; CR, OC	United States; Lea Loveless (1:01.98); Amanda Beard (1:09.26); Jenny Thompson (59.83); Amy Van Dyken (54.53)	4:05.60	Japan; Noriko Inada (1:01.58); Masami Tanaka (1:10.24); Ayari Aoyama (1:00.48); Suzu Chiba (54.88)	4:07.18; NR

Legend: WR – World record; CR – Championship record; AF – African record; AM – Americas record; AS – Asian record; OC – Oceanian record; NR – National record

== Medal table ==
Rank	Nation	Gold	Silver	Bronze	Total
1	United States (USA)	15	16	10	41
2	Australia (AUS)	13	12	10	35
3	Japan (JPN)	4	2	7	13
4	New Zealand (NZL)	1	1	2	4
5	South Africa (RSA)	1	1	0	2
6	Canada (CAN)	0	2	4	6
7	Costa Rica (CRC)	0	0	1	1
Totals (7 entries)		34	34	34	102

== See also ==
- List of Pan Pacific Championships records in swimming
