= 1993 FINA World Swimming Championships (25 m) =

International swimming competition

- Host city: Palma de Mallorca
- Country: Spain
- Opening: 2 December 1993
- Closing: 5 December 1993

The 1st Short Course Swimming World Championships were organized by FINA and held in Palma de Mallorca, Spain, December 2–5, 1993. The meet featured competition in a short course (25 meter) pool. During the championships, a total of 12 world records were broken: 10 in the women's events and 2 in men's events, both in relays.

China won the most events, ten, all in women's events. Le Jingyi won two individual and three relay events to travel home with five golds; Dai Guohong went home with four golds and one silver. In the men's events, the USA and Australia won three events each. Tripp Schwenk of the USA garnered three golds, winning the two backstroke events and also swimming on the USA's winning medley relay team. Also winning 2 events each on the men's side were Fernando Scherer of Brazil (100 m freestyle; 400 m freestyle relay), Daniel Kowalski of Australia (400 m and 1500 m freestyles). Belgium and Moldova won their only medals at a Short Course Worlds (through 2006), while Franck Esposito won France's only gold to date when he won the 200 butterfly.

== Participating nations ==
The 1993 SC Worlds featured 313 swimmers from 46 nations:

- Algeria
- Australia
- Belgium
- Brazil
- Canada
- China
- Colombia
- Croatia
- Cuba
- Czech Republic
- Denmark
- Ecuador
- Estonia
- Finland
- France
- Germany
- Great Britain
- Greece
- India
- Ireland
- Italy
- Japan
- Kazakhstan
- Latvia
- Macedonia
- Moldova
- Netherlands
- New Zealand
- Norway
- Poland
- Portugal
- Puerto Rico
- Russia
- Slovakia
- Slovenia
- South Africa
- Spain
- Sweden
- Switzerland
- Syria
- Trinidad & Tobago
- Ukraine
- Uruguay
- USA
- Yugoslavia

== Results ==
=== Men's ===
Event	Gold		Silver		Bronze	
50 m Freestyle details	Mark Foster (United Kingdom) Great Britain	21.84	Hu Bin; China	21.93	Robert Abernethy; Australia	21.97
100 m Freestyle details	Fernando Scherer; Brazil	48.38	Gustavo Borges; Brazil	48.42	Jon Olsen (United States) USA	48.49
200 m Freestyle details	Antti Kasvio; Finland	1:45.21	Trent Bray; New Zealand; Artur Wojdat; Poland	1:45.53	not awarded	
400 m Freestyle details	Daniel Kowalski; Australia	3:42.95	Antti Kasvio; Finland	3:42.98	Paul Palmer (United Kingdom) Great Britain	3:45.07
1500 m Freestyle details	Daniel Kowalski; Australia	14:42.04	Jörg Hoffmann; Germany	14:53.09	Piotr Albinski; Poland	14:53.97
100 m Backstroke details	Tripp Schwenk (United States) USA	52.98	Martin Harris (United Kingdom) Great Britain	53.93	Rodolfo Falcón; Cuba	54.00
200 m Backstroke details	Tripp Schwenk (United States) USA	1:54.19	Luca Bianchi; Italy	1:55.09	Stefaan Maene; Belgium	1:55.68
100 m Breaststroke details	Phil Rogers; Australia	59.56	Ron Dekker; Netherlands	59.95	Seth Van Neerden (United States) USA	1:00.08
200 m Breaststroke details	Nick Gillingham (United Kingdom) Great Britain	2:07.91; ER	Phil Rogers; Australia	2:08.32	Eric Wunderlich (United States) USA	2:08.49
100 m Butterfly details	Miloš Milošević; Croatia	52.79	Mark Henderson (United States) USA	52.92	Rafał Szukała; Poland	52.94
200 m Butterfly details	Franck Esposito; France	1:55.42	Christian Keller; Germany	1:55.75	Chris-Carol Bremer; Germany	1:56.86
200 m I.M. details	Christian Keller; Germany	1:56.80	Fraser Walker (United Kingdom) Great Britain	1:58.35; NR	Curtis Myden; Canada	1:59.27
400 I.M. details	Curtis Myden; Canada	4:10.41	Serghei Mariniuc; Moldova	4:11.96	Petteri Lehtinen; Finland	4:12.33
4 × 100 m Freestyle Relay details	Brazil; Fernando Scherer; Teófilo Ferreira; Gustavo Borges; José Carlos Souza	3:12.11; WR	(United States) USA; David Fox; Seth Pepper; Jon Olsen; Mark Henderson	3:12.68	Russia; Roman Shegolev; Vladislav Kulikov; Vladimir Predkin; Yury Mukhin	3:15.56
4 × 200 m Freestyle Relay details	Sweden; Christer Wallin; Tommy Werner; Lars Frölander; Anders Holmertz	7:05.92	Germany; Christian Tröger; Christian Keller; Chris-Carol Bremer; Jörg Hoffmann	7:08.63	Brazil; Gustavo Borges; Teófilo Ferreira; José Carlos Souza; Cassiano Leal	7:09.38; SA
4 × 100 m Medley Relay details	(United States) USA; Tripp Schwenk; Seth Van Neerden; Mark Henderson; Jon Olsen	3:32.57; WR	Spain; Carlos Ventosa; Sergio López; Joaquín Fernández; José Maria Rojano	3:36.92	(United Kingdom) Great Britain; Martin Harris; Nick Gillingham; Mike Fibbens; Mark Foster	3:37.27

=== Women's ===
Event	Gold		Silver		Bronze	
50 m Freestyle details	Le Jingyi; China	24.23; WR	Angel Martino (United States) USA	24.93	Linda Olofsson; Sweden	25.21
100 m Freestyle details	Le Jingyi; China	53.01; WR	Angel Martino (United States) USA	53.39	Karen Pickering (United Kingdom) Great Britain	54.39
200 m Freestyle details	Karen Pickering (United Kingdom) Great Britain	1:56.25	Susie O'Neill; Australia	1:57.16	Lü Bin; China	1:57.71
400 m Freestyle details	Janet Evans (United States) USA	4:05.64	Trina Jackson (United States) USA	4:07.49	Julie Majer; Australia	4:07.91
800 m Freestyle details	Janet Evans (United States) USA	8:22.43	Julie Majer; Australia	8:26.46	Trina Jackson (United States) USA	8:27.50
100 m Backstroke details	Angel Martino (United States) USA	58.50; WR	He Cihong; China	1:00.13	Elli Overton; Australia	1:00.18
200 m Backstroke details	He Cihong; China	2:06.09; WR	Jia Yuanyuan; China	2:07.95	Cathleen Rund; Germany	2:09.59
100 m Breaststroke details	Dai Guohong; China	1:06.58; WR	Linley Frame; Australia	1:07.65	Samantha Riley; Australia	1:07.77
200 m Breaststroke details	Dai Guohong; China	2:21.99; WR	Hitomi Maehara; Japan	2:24.45	Samantha Riley; Australia	2:24.75
100 m Butterfly details	Susie O'Neill; Australia	59.19	Liu Limin; China	59.24	Kristie Krueger (United States) USA	59.53
200 m Butterfly details	Liu Limin; China	2:08.51	Susie O'Neill; Australia	2:09.08	Petria Thomas; Australia	2:09.40
200 m I.M. details	Allison Wagner (United States) USA	2:07.79; WR	Dai Guohong; China	2:09.21	Elli Overton; Australia	2:10.51
400 I.M. details	Dai Guohong; China	4:29.00; WR	Allison Wagner (United States) USA	4:31.76	Julie Majer; Australia	4:37.50
4 × 100 m Freestyle Relay details	China; Lu Bin; Shan Ying; Jia Yuanyuan; Le Jingyi	3:35.97; WR	Sweden; Ellenor Svensson; Linda Olofsson; Suzanne Lööv; Louise Jöhncke	3:39.41	(United States) USA; Angel Martino; Sarah Perroni; Kristie Krueger; Paige Wilson	3:40.40
4 × 200 m Freestyle Relay details	China; Shan Ying; Zhou Guanbin; Le Jingyi; Lü Bin	7:52.45; WR	Australia; Tammy Bruce; Elli Overton; Anna Windsor; Susie O'Neill	7:56.52	(United States) USA; Paige Wilson; Sarah Perroni; Trina Jackson; Janet Evans	8:02.99
4 × 100 m Medley Relay details	China; Le Jingyi; He Cihong; Liu Limin; Dai Guohong	3:57.73; WR	Australia; Elli Overton; Linley Frame; Petria Thomas; Susie O'Neill	4:00.17	(United States) USA; Angel Martino; Kelli King; Kristie Krueger; Sarah Perroni	4:01.30

=== Medal standings ===
Rank	Nation	Gold	Silver	Bronze	Total
1	China (CHN)	10	5	1	16
2	United States (USA)	7	6	8	21
3	Australia (AUS)	4	7	8	19
4	Great Britain (GBR)	3	2	3	8
5	Brazil (BRA)	2	1	1	4
6	Germany (GER)	1	3	2	6
7	Finland (FIN)	1	1	1	3
7	Sweden (SWE)	1	1	1	3
9	Canada (CAN)	1	0	1	2
10	Croatia (CRO)	1	0	0	1
10	France (FRA)	1	0	0	1
12	Poland (POL)	0	1	2	3
13	Italy (ITA)	0	1	0	1
13	Japan (JPN)	0	1	0	1
13	Moldova (MDA)	0	1	0	1
13	Netherlands (NED)	0	1	0	1
13	New Zealand (NZL)	0	1	0	1
13	Spain (ESP)	0	1	0	1
19	Belgium (BEL)	0	0	1	1
19	Cuba (CUB)	0	0	1	1
19	Russia (RUS)	0	0	1	1
Totals (21 entries)		32	33	31	96
