= Tripp Schwenk =

American swimmer (born 1971)

Personal information
- Full name: William Douglas Schwenk III
- Nickname: "Tripp"
- National team: United States
- Born: June 17, 1971 (age 55) Sarasota, Florida, U.S.
- Height: 6 ft 3 in (1.91 m)
- Weight: 174 lb (79 kg)

Sport
- Sport: Swimming
- Strokes: Backstroke
- Club: Sarasota YMCA
- College team: University of Tennessee
- Coach: John Trembley; University of Tennessee
Medal record
Men's swimming
Representing the United States
Olympic Games
Gold medal – first place	1996 Atlanta	4×100 m medley
Silver medal – second place	1996 Atlanta	200 m backstroke
World Championships (SC)
Gold medal – first place	1993 Palma	100 m backstroke
Gold medal – first place	1993 Palma	200 m backstroke
Gold medal – first place	1993 Palma	4×100 m medley
Pan Pacific Championships
Gold medal – first place	1995 Atlanta	200 m backstroke
Silver medal – second place	1993 Kobe	200 m backstroke
Silver medal – second place	1995 Atlanta	100 m backstroke
Pan American Games
Silver medal – second place	1995 Mar del Plata	100 m backstroke
Universiade
Gold medal – first place	1991 Sheffield	200 m backstroke
Gold medal – first place	1991 Sheffield	4×100 m medley
Gold medal – first place	1993 Buffalo	4×100 m medley
Silver medal – second place	1991 Sheffield	100 m backstroke
Silver medal – second place	1993 Buffalo	100 m backstroke
Bronze medal – third place	1993 Buffalo	200 m backstroke

William Douglas "Tripp" Schwenk III (born June 17, 1971) is an American former competition swimmer, Olympic champion, and former world record-holder.

Schwenk swam for the University of Tennessee where he was coached by Head Coach John Trembley. While swimming for Tennessee, he captured the NCAA 200 backstroke title in 1992 and won Southeastern Conference titles three times.

== 1992, 1996 Olympics ==
Schwenk represented the United States at two consecutive Olympic Games. At the 1992 Summer Olympics in Barcelona, Spain, he competed in the men's 200-meter backstroke and finished fifth in the event final in a time of 1:59.73.

At the 1996 Summer Olympics in Atlanta, Georgia, he received a gold medal for swimming for the winning U.S. team in the preliminary heats of the men's 4×100-meter medley. Individually, Schwenk also received the silver medal for recording a 1:58.99 second-place finish in the men's 200-meter backstroke. He also competed in the men's 100-meter backstroke, finishing in fifth place in the final with a time of 55.30 seconds.

In international competition, Schwenk was a competitor at both the 1991 and 1993 Universiade, where he took three gold medals and five medals in all. He won a gold medal in the 200 backstroke at the Pan Pacific Championships in 1995.

Schwenk later served as a K-9 Unit police officer in Sarasota, Florida, where he lived with his wife, one son and a daughter.

== See also ==
- List of Olympic medalists in swimming (men)
- List of University of Tennessee people
- World record progression 4 × 100 metres medley relay
