= Linley Frame =

Australian swimmer (born 1971)

Personal information
- Full name: Linley Margaret Frame
- National team: Australia
- Born: 12 November 1971 (age 54) Melbourne, Victoria
- Height: 1.72 m (5 ft 8 in)
- Weight: 72 kg (159 lb)

Sport
- Sport: Swimming
- Strokes: Breaststroke
- Club: Melbourne Vicentre
Medal record
Women's swimming
Representing Australia
FINA World Championships (LC)
Gold medal – first place	1991 Perth	100 m breaststroke
Silver medal – second place	1991 Perth	200 m breaststroke
Silver medal – second place	1991 Perth	4×100 m medley
World Championships (SC)
Silver medal – second place	1993 Palma	100 m breaststroke
Bronze medal – third place	1995 Rio	100 m breaststroke
Pan Pacific Championships
Gold medal – first place	1991 Edmonton	100 m breaststroke
Silver medal – second place	1991 Edmonton	4×100 m medley
FINA World Masters Championships
Gold medal – first place	2014 Montreal	W40-44 50m breast
Gold medal – first place	2014 Montreal	W40-44 100m breast
Gold medal – first place	2014 Montreal	W40-44 200m breast

Linley Margaret Frame (born 12 November 1971), is an Australian competitive swimmer who won a gold medal in the 100-metre breaststroke at the 1991 FINA World Aquatics Championships, and represented Australia at the 1992 Summer Olympics in Barcelona, coming in 15th and 19th in her breaststroke events.

At the Australian Institute of Sport (AIS) she was coached by Terry Gathercole. She was named AIS Athlete of the Year in 1991.

In 1996, Frame retired from swimming after developing chronic fatigue syndrome.

Frame was a poolside interviewer for Channel Seven at the 1996 Summer Olympics in Atlanta, 2000 Summer Olympics in Sydney, and was a studio pundit for the 2004 Summer Olympics in Athens.

In 2009, Frame made a comeback to swimming. Competing at the 2009 World Masters Games, she won a gold medal in the W35-39 50m breaststroke event, beating the second-place swimmer by more than 3 seconds. Frame now holds FINA Masters World Records for the W40-44 age group in 50m breaststroke and 100m breaststroke events. She competed at the 2014 FINA World Masters Championships in Montreal, and won gold medals in the W40-44 50m, 100m and 200m breaststroke events.

As of 2014, Frame works at Swimming Victoria as Athlete and Coach Liaison Officer. Since 2001, she has been an ambassador for Red Dust Role Models, a charity that visits remote Aboriginal communities throughout the Northern Territory and Western Australia, teaching children the importance of a healthy lifestyle and good education.

== Philanthropy ==
Frame is a distinguished ambassador of The Fred Hollows Foundation in which she helps raise awareness for this international non-profit organization. The Fred Hollows Foundation educates surgeons on how to cure avoidable blindness within underserved communities and countries. Specifically, they work within the Aboriginal and Torres Strait Islander communities of Indigenous Australia.
