= 1993 FINA World Swimming Championships (25 m) – Women's 100 metre butterfly =

These are the official results of the Women's 100 metres Butterfly event at the 1993 FINA Short Course World Championships held in Palma de Mallorca, Spain.

== Finals ==
RANK	FINAL A	TIME
	Susie O'Neill (AUS)	59.19
	Liu Limin (CHN)	59.24
	Kristie Krueger (USA)	59.53
4.	Petria Thomas (AUS)	59.95
5.	Mette Jacobsen (DEN)	1:00.29
6.	Cécile Jeanson (FRA)	1:00.53
7.	Sarah Evanetz (CAN)	1:01.22
8.	Paige Wilson (USA)	1:01.24

== Qualifying heats ==
RANK	HEATS RANKING	TIME
1.	Liu Limin (CHN)	1:00.12
2.	Kristie Krueger (USA)	1:00.24
3.	Susie O'Neill (AUS)	1:00.55
4.	Petria Thomas (AUS)	1:00.67
5.	Mette Jacobsen (DEN)	1:01.05
6.	Cécile Jeanson (FRA)	1:01.23
7.	Paige Wilson (USA)	1:01.29
8.	Sarah Evanetz (CAN)	1:01.33

== See also ==
- 1992 Women's Olympic Games 100m Butterfly
- 1993 Women's European LC Championships 100m Butterfly
