= 1993 FINA World Swimming Championships (25 m) – Men's 4 × 100 metre medley relay =

The finals and the qualifying heats of the Men's 4 × 100 metres Medley Relay event at the 1993 FINA Short Course World Championships were held in Palma de Mallorca, Spain.

== Final ==
Rank	Final	Time
	United States; Tripp Schwenk; Seth Van Neerden; Mark Henderson; Jon Olsen	3:32.57 WR
	Spain; Carlos Ventosa; Sergio López Miró; Joaquín Fernández; José Maria Rojano	3:36.92
	Great Britain; Martin Harris; Nick Gillingham; Mike Fibbens; Mark Foster	3:37.27
4.	Russia; Vitaly Kirinchuk; Vasily Ivanov; Vladislav Kulikov; Vladimir Predkin	3:38.52
5.	Brazil; Rogério Romero; Maurício Menezes; José Carlos Souza; Gustavo Borges	3:38.93
6.	Canada; Gary Anderson; Jonathan Cleveland; Curtis Myden; Dean Kondziolka	3:39.72
7.	Italy; Emanuele Merisi; Andrea Cecchi; Emanuele Idini; Pier Maria Siciliano	3:43.80
—	New Zealand; Craig Ford; Paul Kent; Jonathan Winter; Trent Bray	DSQ

== See also ==
- 1992 Men's Olympic Games 4 × 100 m Medley Relay
- 1993 Men's European LC Championships 4 × 100 m Medley Relay
