= 1995 FINA World Swimming Championships (25 m) =

- Host city: Rio de Janeiro, Brazil
- Date(s): 30 November – 3 December
- Venue(s): Copacabana Beach (temporary venue)
- Nations participating: 57
- Athletes participating: 350
- Events: 32

The 2nd FINA World Swimming Championships (25 m) was an international swimming meet held on Copacabana Beach in Rio de Janeiro, Brazil, 30 November until 3 December 1995. The meet featured 32 events swum in a short course (25 m) pool.

The United States did poorly, as the meet dates fell in the middle (rather than the end) of the USA's annual competition season (particularly the college season), the USA had just hosted the 1995 Pan Pacs, and the USA would host the 1996 Summer Olympics.

== Participating nations ==
350 swimmers participate at the meet, from 57 nations.

- Argentina
- Australia
- Barbados
- Belgium
- Brazil
- Bulgaria
- Canada
- Chile
- China
- Chinese Taipei
- Colombia
- Costa Rica
- Croatia
- Cuba
- Czech Republic
- Denmark
- Ecuador
- Egypt
- Estonia
- France
- Germany
- Great Britain
- Greece
- Hungary
- Italy
- Jamaica
- Japan
- Kazakhstan
- Latvia
- Macedonia
- Moldova
- Monaco
- Netherlands
- New Zealand
- Peru
- Poland
- Portugal
- Puerto Rico
- Romania
- Russia
- Serbia & Montenegro
- Slovakia
- Slovenia
- South Africa
- Spain
- Sweden
- Trinidad & Tobago
- Ukraine
- Uruguay
- USA
- Venezuela

== Results ==
=== Men's events ===
Event	Gold		Silver		Bronze	
50 m freestyle	Francisco Sánchez; Venezuela	21.80	Fernando Scherer; Brazil	22.08	Jiang Chengji; China	22.17
100 m freestyle	Fernando Scherer; Brazil	47.97	Gustavo Borges; Brazil	48.00	Francisco Sánchez; Venezuela	48.46
200 m freestyle	Gustavo Borges; Brazil	1:45.55	Trent Bray; New Zealand	1:46.18	Michael Klim; Australia	1:46.44
400 m freestyle	Daniel Kowalski; Australia	3:45.14	Jörg Hoffmann; Germany	3:45.65	Malcolm Allen; Australia	3:47.00
1500 m freestyle	Daniel Kowalski; Australia	14:48.51	Ian Wilson; Great Britain	14:49.72	Jörg Hoffmann; Germany	15:05.36
100 m backstroke	Rodolfo Falcón; Cuba	53.12	Neil Willey; Great Britain	53.23	Jirka Letzin; Germany	53.65
200 m backstroke	Rodolfo Falcón; Cuba	1:55.16	Chris Renaud; Canada	1:55.27	Tamás Deutsch; Hungary	1:56.18
100 m breaststroke	Mark Warnecke; Germany	59.89	Paul Kent; New Zealand	1:00.14	Stanislav Lopukhov; Russia	1.00.33
200 m breaststroke	Wang Yiwu; China	2:11.11	Ryan Mitchell; Australia	2:11.46	Jean-Lionel Rey; France	2.11.92
100 m butterfly	Scott Miller; Australia	52.38	Denis Pimankov; Russia	52.64	Michael Klim; Australia	52.80
200 m butterfly	Scott Goodman; Australia	1:54.79	Scott Miller; Australia	1:56.36	Chris-Carol Bremer; Germany	1:57.30
200 m individual medley	Matthew Dunn; Australia	1:56.86	Curtis Myden; Canada	1:58.56	Marcin Maliński; Poland	1:58.61
400 m individual medley	Matthew Dunn; Australia	4:08.02	Curtis Myden; Canada	4:09.39	Marcin Maliński; Poland	4:10.37
4 × 100 m freestyle relay	Brazil; Fernando Scherer; Alexandre Massura; André Cordeiro; Gustavo Borges	3:12.42	Australia; Brett Hawke; Michael Klim; Richard Upton; Matthew Dunn	3:17.27	Romania; Nicolae Ivan; Răzvan Petcu; Alexandru Ioanovici; Nicolae Butacu	3:17.40
4 × 200 m freestyle relay	Australia; Michael Klim; Matthew Dunn; Malcolm Allen; Daniel Kowalski	7:07.97	Germany; Chris-Carol Bremer; Steffen Zesner; Torsten Spanneberg; Jörg Hoffmann	7:13.42	Brazil; Cassiano Leal; Fernando Saez; Teófilo Ferreira; Gustavo Borges	7:13.64
4 × 100 m medley relay	New Zealand; Jonathan Winter; Paul Kent; Guy Callaghan; Trent Bray	3:35.69	Australia; Adrian Radley; Robert van der Zant; Scott Miller; Michael Klim	3:36.35	Russia; Sergei Sudakov; Alexander Tkachev; Denis Pimankov; Yury Mukhin	3:36.88

=== Women's events ===
Event	Gold		Silver		Bronze	
50 m freestyle	Le Jingyi; China	24.62	Angela Postma; Netherlands	25.10	Sandra Völker; Germany	25.21
100 m freestyle	Le Jingyi; China	53.23	Chao Na; China	54.52	Sandra Völker; Germany	54.69
200 m freestyle	Claudia Poll; Costa Rica	1:55.42 WR	Susie O'Neill; Australia	1:56.47	Martina Moravcová; Slovakia	1:56.61
400 m freestyle	Claudia Poll; Costa Rica	4:05.18	Carla Geurts; Netherlands	4:06.20	Sarah Hardcastle; Great Britain	4:07.20
800 m freestyle	Sarah Hardcastle; Great Britain	8:26.46	Carla Geurts; Netherlands	8:27.03	Ping Lio; China	8:29.95
100 m breaststroke	Samantha Riley; Australia	1:05.70 WR	Svitlana Bondarenko; Ukraine	1:07.78	Linley Frame; Australia	1:08.61
200 m breaststroke	Samantha Riley; Australia	2:20.85 WR	Svitlana Bondarenko; Ukraine	2:24.78	Alicja Pęczak; Poland	2:25.62
100 m backstroke	Misty Hyman; United States	1:00.21	Mette Jacobsen; Denmark	1:00.25	Barbara Bedford; United States	1:00.63
200 m backstroke	Mette Jacobsen; Denmark	2:08.18	Dagmar Hase; Germany	2:09.00	Leigh Habler; Australia	2:09.33
100 m butterfly	Liu Limin; China	58.68 WR	Susie O'Neill; Australia	58.69	Angela Kennedy; Australia	58.74
200 m butterfly	Susie O'Neill; Australia	2:06.18	Liu Limin; China	2:06.51	Mette Jacobsen; Denmark	2:11.07
200 m individual medley	Elli Overton; Australia	2:11.67	Martina Moravcová; Slovakia	2:11.91	Louise Karlsson; Sweden	2:12.38
400 m individual medley	Joanne Malar; Canada	4:36.40	Nancy Sweetnam; Canada	4:37.04	Britta Vestergaard; Denmark	4:37.10
4 × 100 m freestyle relay	China; Chao Na; Shan Ying; Han Xue; Le Jingyi	3:37.00	Australia; Melanie Dodd; Sarah Ryan; Anna Windsor; Susie O'Neill	3:38.72	Sweden; Johanna Sjöberg; Louise Karlsson; Linda Olofsson; Louise Jöhncke	3:40.06
4 × 200 m freestyle relay	Canada; Marianne Limpert; Shannon Shakespeare; Sarah Evanetz; Joanne Malar	7:58.25	Germany; Dagmar Hase; Kerstin Kielgass; Julia Jung; Franziska van Almsick	8:01.11	Australia; Anna Windsor; Samantha Mackie; Nicole Stevenson; Susie O'Neill	8:01.86
4 × 100 m medley relay	Australia; Elli Overton; Samantha Riley; Angela Kennedy; Susie O'Neill	4:00.46	Canada; Julie Howard; Lisa Flood; Jessica Amey; Shannon Shakespeare	4:03.89	United States; Barbara Bedford; Kelli King-Bednar; Misty Hyman; Courtney Shealy	4:04.34

=== Medal standings ===
Rank	Nation	Gold	Silver	Bronze	Total
1	Australia (AUS)	12	7	7	26
2	China (CHN)	5	2	2	9
3	Brazil (BRA)	3	2	1	6
4	Canada (CAN)	2	5	0	7
5	Costa Rica (CRC)	2	0	0	2
5	Cuba (CUB)	2	0	0	2
7	Germany (GER)	1	4	5	10
8	Great Britain (GBR)	1	2	1	4
9	New Zealand (NZL)	1	2	0	3
10	Denmark (DEN)	1	1	2	4
11	United States (USA)	1	0	2	3
12	Venezuela (VEN)	1	0	1	2
13	Netherlands (NED)	0	3	0	3
14	Ukraine (UKR)	0	2	0	2
15	Russia (RUS)	0	1	2	3
16	Slovakia (SVK)	0	1	1	2
17	Poland (POL)	0	0	3	3
18	Sweden (SWE)	0	0	2	2
19	France (FRA)	0	0	1	1
19	Hungary (HUN)	0	0	1	1
19	Romania (ROU)	0	0	1	1
Totals (21 entries)		32	32	32	96
