= Joanne Malar =

Canadian swimmer

Personal information
- Full name: Joanne Susan Malar
- National team: Canada
- Born: October 30, 1975 (age 50) Hamilton, Ontario, Canada
- Height: 1.73 m (5 ft 8 in)
- Weight: 63 kg (139 lb)

Sport
- Sport: Swimming
- Strokes: Freestyle, medley
Medal record
Women's swimming
Representing Canada
World Championships (SC)
Gold medal – first place	1995 Rio de Janeiro	400 m medley
Gold medal – first place	1995 Rio de Janeiro	4x200 m freestyle
Silver medal – second place	1999 Hong Kong	400 m medley
Bronze medal – third place	1997 Gothenburg	400 m medley
Bronze medal – third place	1999 Hong Kong	400 m freestyle
Pan Pacific Championships
Gold medal – first place	1999 Sydney	200 m medley
Gold medal – first place	1999 Sydney	400 m medley
Silver medal – second place	1995 Atlanta	200 m medley
Bronze medal – third place	1993 Kobe	4x100 m freestyle
Bronze medal – third place	1995 Atlanta	4x200 m freestyle
Bronze medal – third place	1997 Fukuoka	200 m freestyle
Bronze medal – third place	1997 Fukuoka	200 m medley
Bronze medal – third place	1997 Fukuoka	400 m medley
Bronze medal – third place	1997 Fukuoka	4x200 m freestyle
Bronze medal – third place	1999 Sydney	4x200 m freestyle
Commonwealth Games
Gold medal – first place	1998 Kuala Lumpur	400 m medley
Silver medal – second place	1998 Kuala Lumpur	200 m medley
Silver medal – second place	1998 Kuala Lumpur	800 m freestyle
Bronze medal – third place	1994 Victoria	4x200 m freestyle
Bronze medal – third place	1998 Kuala Lumpur	400 m freestyle
Bronze medal – third place	1998 Kuala Lumpur	4x200 m freestyle
Pan American Games
Gold medal – first place	1995 Mar del Plata	200 m medley
Gold medal – first place	1995 Mar del Plata	400 m medley
Gold medal – first place	1999 Winnipeg	200 m medley
Gold medal – first place	1999 Winnipeg	400 m medley
Gold medal – first place	1999 Winnipeg	4x200 m freestyle
Gold medal – first place	2003 Santo Domingo	200 m medley
Silver medal – second place	1991 Havana	200 m medley
Silver medal – second place	1991 Havana	400 m medley
Silver medal – second place	1991 Havana	4x100 m freestyle
Silver medal – second place	1991 Havana	4x200 m freestyle
Silver medal – second place	1995 Mar del Plata	4x100m freestyle
Silver medal – second place	1995 Mar del Plata	4x200m freestyle
Silver medal – second place	1995 Mar del Plata	4x100m medley
Silver medal – second place	2003 Santo Domingo	4x100 m freestyle
Silver medal – second place	2003 Santo Domingo	4x100 m medley
Bronze medal – third place	1991 Havana	200 m backstroke
Bronze medal – third place	1995 Mar del Plata	200 m backstroke
Bronze medal – third place	2003 Santo Domingo	4x200 m freestyle

Joanne Susan Malar (born October 30, 1975) is a former medley swimmer from Canada, who competed in three consecutive Summer Olympics, starting in 1992.

== Early life ==
Swimming was important to her and her family, because her family camped often. She has two sisters and a brother, and speaks French. She attended McMaster University and St. Thomas More Catholic Secondary School.

Malar’s first pool experience was when she was five weeks old. She started racing at 5. At 10, she set her first provincial record. Two years later, Malar went to her first national swim meet, the trials for the 1988 Olympic Games. Besides being a talented swimmer, she was a gifted basketball player. In grade nine, she chose swimming over basketball as her preferred sport.

== Swimming career ==
When Malar began her swimming career, she impressed many people with her unexpected success early on. She began swimming competitively with HWAC (Hamilton Wentworth Aquatic Club) and still currently holds 20 SC records and 25 LC. At the 1991 Pan American Games, she won two silvers and a bronze. At the 1994 LC World Championships, she came in fourth for the 400m Individual Medley. In 1995, she won four golds and a bronze.

In 1995, at the 1995 FINA Short Course World Championships, she won two gold medals. That same year at the 1995 Pan American Games, she won a bronze and two gold medals, having developed a new swimming style.

There were high expectations for Malar to medal at the 1996 Summer Olympics in Atlanta, Georgia. Due to her potential, she appeared on the box for Kellogg's Special K (in a black bathing suit) and a television ad for Salon Selectives Shampoo conditioner. In the 400m Medley, considered her strongest event, she failed to make the finals. In the 200m Medley, Malar finished fourth just narrowly missing the podium, while Canadian teammate Marianne Limpert took the silver. Ireland's Michelle Smith won that race, ending up with three gold medals from the Atlanta Games.

Malar won Gold at the 1998 Commonwealth Games.

In 1999, at the 1999 FINA Short Course World Championships, Malar achieved silver and bronze. At the 1999 Pan American Games and 1999 Pan Pacific Swimming Championships, she won two gold medals each time.

At the 2000 Summer Olympics, Malar finished fifth in the 200 Medley, with Limpert fourth. Malar also finished 7th in the 400m Medley. Malar and Curtis Myden were sponsored by Sears Canada around these Games. The Sydney Olympics was a subpar performance for Swimming Canada, leading to heavy criticism of head coach Dave Johnson, as only medal was Curtis Myden's bronze.

Three years later in May 2003, Malar revealed that she was coming out of retirement, a big surprise to many. At the 2003 Pan American Games she won one gold and came in fourth twice. Admittingly, countries use this event for international experience for the upcoming swimmers. Malar failed to qualify for the 2004 Olympics after she finished fourth in the 400m Medley. She retired from competitive swimming afterwards, with 30 national titles and over 70 International medals to her name.

She currently lives in Summerland, B.C where she helps coach the local swim club (Orca) and works for the District of Summerland. She lives there with her second husband, Delano Ducheck, and their four sons Desmond, Mateo, Ary and Remy.

== See also ==
- Pan American Games records in swimming
