= 1993 FINA World Swimming Championships (25 m) – Women's 800 metre freestyle =

The finals and the qualifying heats of the Women's 800 metres Freestyle event at the 1993 FINA Short Course World Championships were held in Palma de Mallorca, Spain.

== Results ==
RANK	FINAL RESULTS	TIME
	Janet Evans (USA)	8:22.43
	Julie Majer (AUS)	8:26.46
	Trina Jackson (USA)	8:27.50
4.	Jana Henke (GER)	8:31.89
5.	Sachiko Miyaji (JPN)	8:31.91
6.	Melissa Knox (CAN)	8:40.71
7.	Susana Vazquez (ESP)	8:42.88
8.	Zhou Guanbin (CHN)	8:45.83
9.	Karen Allen (RSA)	8:48.87
10.	Itziar Esparza (ESP)	8:49.88
11.	Sun Xuemei (CHN)	8:54.30

== See also ==
- 1992 Women's Olympic Games 800m Freestyle
- 1993 Women's European LC Championships 800m Freestyle
