= Elli Overton =

Australian swimmer

Personal information
- Full name: Ellinora Jillian Overton
- National team: Australia
- Born: 13 June 1974 (age 52) Vancouver, British Columbia
- Height: 1.78 m (5 ft 10 in)
- Weight: 72 kg (159 lb)

Sport
- Sport: Swimming
- Strokes: Freestyle, medley, backstroke
- Club: Galston Swim Club
- College team: University of California, Berkeley
Medal record
Women's swimming
Representing Australia
World Championships (LC)
Bronze medal – third place	1994 Rome	200 m medley
World Championships (SC)
Gold medal – first place	1995 Rio	200 m medley
Gold medal – first place	1995 Rio	4×100 m medley
Silver medal – second place	1993 Mallorca	4×200 m free
Silver medal – second place	1993 Mallorca	4×100 m medley
Bronze medal – third place	1993 Mallorca	200 m medley
Bronze medal – third place	1993 Mallorca	100 m backstroke
Pan Pacific Championships
Gold medal – first place	1995 Atlanta	200 m medley
Bronze medal – third place	1993 Kobe	200 m medley
Bronze medal – third place	1995 Atlanta	400 m medley
Bronze medal – third place	1999 Sydney	200 m medley
Commonwealth Games
Gold medal – first place	1994 Victoria	200 m medley
Gold medal – first place	1994 Victoria	400 m medley
Silver medal – second place	1994 Victoria	100 m backstroke
Bronze medal – third place	1994 Victoria	200 m backstroke
Bronze medal – third place	1994 Victoria	100 m butterfly
Summer Universiade
Silver medal – second place	1997 Catania	200 m medley
Bronze medal – third place	1997 Catania	400 m medley

Ellinora Jillian Overton (born 13 June 1974) is an Australian former swimmer. She competed in the backstroke and medley swimmer at three consecutive Summer Olympics for Australia, starting in 1992.

== Olympic career ==
After narrowly missing a bronze medal at the 1991 World Championships in the 200-metre individual medley, Overton went on to a 5th-place finish at the 1992 Summer Olympics in Barcelona, Spain. She won the bronze medal in the 200-metre individual medley at the inaugural 1993 FINA Short Course World Championships in Palma de Mallorca, Spain, followed by the gold medal two years later at the 1995 FINA Short Course World Championships in Rio de Janeiro. After winning a bronze medal at the 1994 World Championships, she moved from Sydney to Brisbane to train with Susan O'Neill and Samantha Riley under coach Scott Volkers.

Overton again finished 5th at the 1996 Summer Olympics in Atlanta, after which she moved to Berkeley, California to train, compete and study at the University of California, Berkeley. Overton retired from swimming after graduating with high honors from the Haas School of Business and finishing 11th at the 2000 Summer Olympics in Sydney.

== Personal life ==
She attended St Ives High School in Sydney, where she still holds many swimming carnival records. When living in Sydney, Overton trained with former Olympian Gary Winram.

== See also ==
- List of World Aquatics Championships medalists in swimming (women)
- List of Commonwealth Games medallists in swimming (women)
