= Trina Jackson =

American swimmer (born 1977)

Personal information
- Full name: Trina Marie Jackson
- National team: United States
- Born: February 16, 1977 (age 49)
- Height: 5 ft 7 in (1.70 m)
- Weight: 128 lb (58 kg)

Sport
- Sport: Swimming
- Strokes: Freestyle
- Club: Bolles Sharks
- College team: University of Arizona
Medal record
Women's swimming
Representing the United States
Olympic Games
Gold medal – first place	1996 Atlanta	4x200 m freestyle
World Championships (SC)
Silver medal – second place	1993 Palma	400 m freestyle
Bronze medal – third place	1993 Palma	800 m freestyle
Pan Pacific Championships
Gold medal – first place	1995 Atlanta	4x200 m freestyle
Silver medal – second place	1995 Atlanta	400 m freestyle
Bronze medal – third place	1995 Atlanta	800 m freestyle
Pan American Games
Gold medal – first place	1995 Mar del Plata	800 m freestyle
Gold medal – first place	1995 Mar del Plata	200 m butterfly
Gold medal – first place	1995 Mar del Plata	4x200 m freestyle

Trina Marie Jackson (born February 16, 1977), also known by her married name as Trina Falca, is an American former competition swimmer who represented the United States at the 1996 Summer Olympics in Atlanta, Georgia. Jackson won a gold medal as a member of the first-place U.S. team in the women's 4×200-meter freestyle relay, together with teammates Jenny Thompson, Cristina Teuscher and Sheila Taormina. The four Americans set a new Olympic record of 7:59.87 in the event final. She missed a bronze in the individual 200 freestyle by just 0.01 to Dagmar Hase.

For high school, Jackson attended the Bolles School, a private prep school in Jacksonville, Florida, where she swam for coach Gregg Troy's Bolles high school swim team, a program with a reputation for producing future international swimmers and Olympians. She graduated from the Bolles School in 1995.

== See also ==
- List of Olympic medalists in swimming (women)
- List of University of Arizona people
