= Liu Limin =

Chinese swimmer (born 1976)

Personal information
- Full name: 劉 黎敏
- Nationality: China
- Born: March 27, 1976 (age 50)
- Height: 170 cm (5 ft 7 in)
- Weight: 68 kg (150 lb)

Sport
- Sport: Swimming
- Strokes: Butterfly
Medal record
Women's swimming
Representing China
Olympic Games
Silver medal – second place	1996 Atlanta	100 m butterfly
World Championships (LC)
Gold medal – first place	1994 Rome	100 m butterfly
Gold medal – first place	1994 Rome	200 m butterfly
Gold medal – first place	1994 Rome	4x100 m medley relay
World Championships (SC)
Gold medal – first place	1993 Palma	4×100 m medley relay
Gold medal – first place	1993 Palma	200 m butterfly
Silver medal – second place	1993 Palma	100 m butterfly
Gold medal – first place	1995 Rio	100 m butterfly
Silver medal – second place	1995 Rio	200 m butterfly
Gold medal – first place	1997 Gothenburg	200 m butterfly
Summer Universiade
Gold medal – first place	1995 Fukuoka	100 m butterfly
Silver medal – second place	1995 Fukuoka	200 m butterfly

Liu Limin (Chinese: 劉 黎敏; born March 27, 1976) is a former swimmer from China who won the silver medal in the 100 m butterfly at the 1996 Summer Olympics in Atlanta, Georgia. She attended college at the University of Nevada, Reno in the United States. She was inducted into the university's athletic hall of fame in 2010. Limin Liu won three NCAA individual championships during her career, winning the 200 m butterfly at the NCAA Championships in 1999 and the 100 m and 200 m fly in 2000. She holds school and Big West Conference records in the 100 m and 200 m fly. A three-time All-American, Liu was named the Big West Swimmer of the Year in 2000.
