= 1993 FINA World Swimming Championships (25 m) – Men's 50 metre freestyle =

The men's 50 metres freestyle event at the 1st Short Course Worlds, held on 2 December 1993 in Palma de Mallorca, Spain.

== Finals ==
RANK	FINAL A	TIME
	Mark Foster (GBR)	21.84
	Hu Bin (CHN)	21.93
	Robert Abernethy (AUS)	21.97
4.	David Fox (USA)	22.03
5.	Jon Olsen (USA)	22.11
6.	Krzysztof Cwalina (POL)	22.17
7.	Indrek Sei (EST)	22.32
8.	Fernando Scherer (BRA)	22.43

== Qualifying heats ==
RANK	HEATS RANKING	TIME
1.	Mark Foster (GBR)	22.06
2.	Hu Bin (CHN)	22.12
3.	Jon Olsen (USA)	22.20
4.	Krzysztof Cwalina (POL)	22.24
5.	Robert Abernethy (AUS)	22.31
6.	Indrek Sei (EST)	22.33
7.	Fernando Scherer (BRA)	22.38
7.	David Fox (USA)	22.38

== See also ==
- 1995 FINA World Swimming Championships (25 m) – Men's 50 metre freestyle
