= Claudia Franco =

Spanish swimmer (born 1975)

Personal information
- Full name: Claudia Maria Franco Solana
- National team: Spain
- Born: 21 July 1975 (age 50) Madrid, Spain
- Height: 1.70 m (5 ft 7 in)
- Weight: 56 kg (123 lb)

Sport
- Sport: Swimming
- Strokes: Freestyle
- Club: Real Canoe NC
- College team: Stanford University (U.S.); University of Florida (U.S.)
Medal record
Women's swimming
Representing Spain
European Championships (LC)
Bronze medal – third place	1995 Vienna	4×100 m medley

Claudia Maria Franco Solana (born 21 July 1975), also known as Claudia Franco Walsh, is a former competition swimmer who represented Spain at two consecutive Summer Olympics.

== Early years ==
Franco was born in Madrid, Spain. She is the younger sister of Olympic swimmer Barbara Franco. Both sisters attended Mission Viejo High School in Mission Viejo, California, where they swam for the Mission Viejo high school swim team.

== College career ==
Franco attended the University of Florida in Gainesville, Florida, where she swam for the Florida Gators swimming and diving team in National Collegiate Athletic Association (NCAA) competition in 1993 and 1994. During her two years as a Gator, she won four Southeastern Conference (SEC) championships as a member of the Gators winning relay teams, and received six All-American honors. She subsequently transferred to Stanford University in Palo Alto, California, where she won five NCAA championships as a member of Stanford's national championship team in 1996.

== International career ==
At the 1992 Summer Olympics in Barcelona, Spain, Franco competed in the 50-meter freestyle, the 100-meter freestyle, and the 4x100-meter freestyle relay. She finished twenty-first in the world in both individual events, and the Spanish women's team finished thirteenth in the relay. At the 1996 Summer Olympics in Atlanta, Georgia, she was again a member of the Spanish Olympic team, and finished eleventh in the 50-meter freestyle, and twenty-first in the 100-meter freestyle, and was a member of the Spanish relay teams that finished fourteenth in the 4x100-meter freestyle and 4x100-meter medley relay events.

== See also ==
- List of Stanford University people
- List of University of Florida Olympians
