= Franziska van Almsick =

German swimmer (born 1978)

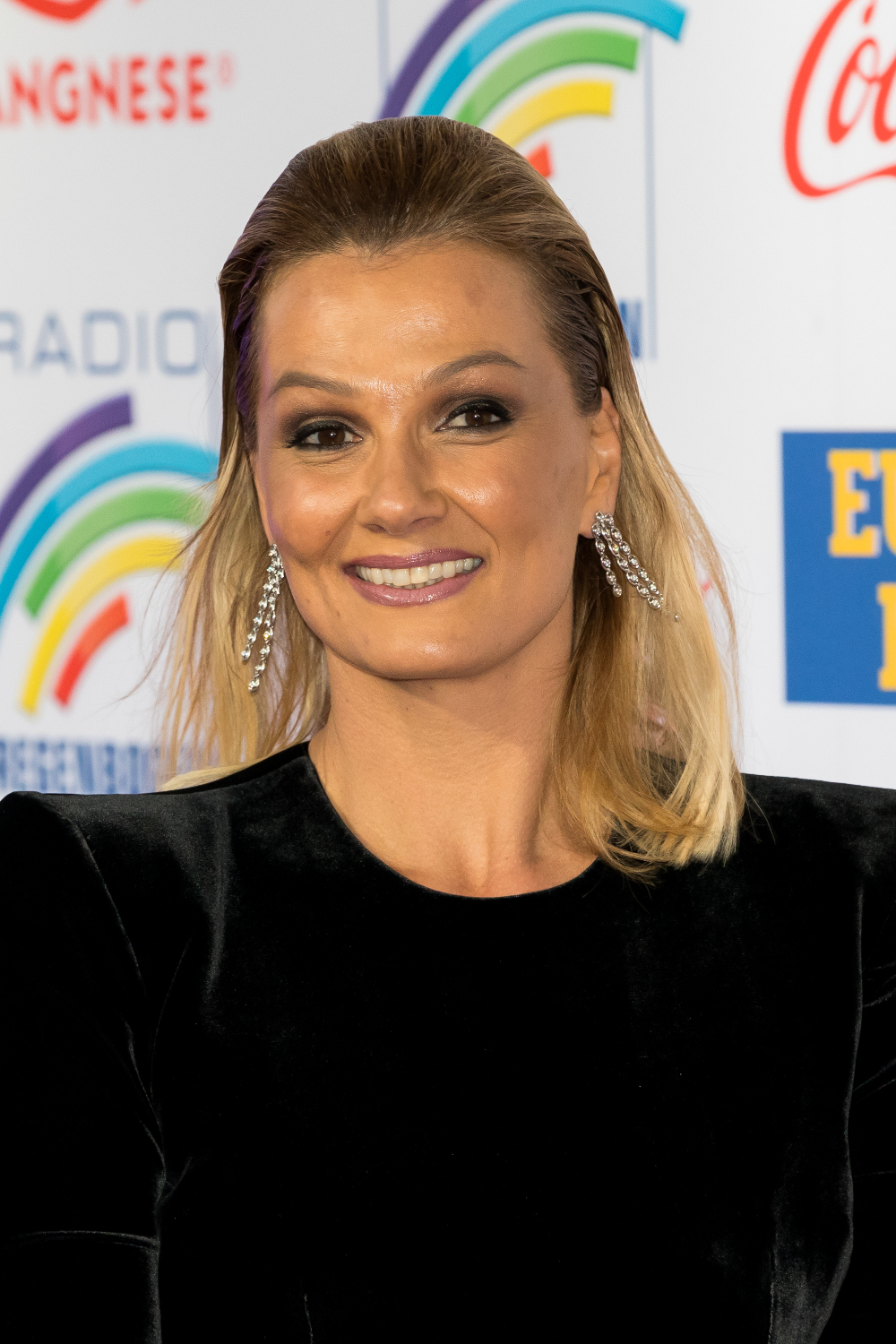
- van Almsick in 2019

Personal information
- Nationality: Germany
- Born: 5 April 1978 (age 48) East Berlin, East Germany
- Height: 1.81 m (5 ft 11 in)
- Weight: 66 kg (146 lb)

Sport
- Sport: Swimming
- Strokes: Freestyle
- Club: SG Neukölln
Medal record
Women's swimming
Representing Germany
Event	1st	2nd	3rd
Olympic Games	0	4	6
World Championships (LC)	2	2	2
World Championships (SC)	0	1	0
European Championships (LC)	18	3	0
European Championships (SC)	4	1	0
Total	24	11	8
Olympic Games
Silver medal – second place	1992 Barcelona	200 m freestyle
Silver medal – second place	1992 Barcelona	4 × 100 m medley
Silver medal – second place	1996 Atlanta	200 m freestyle
Silver medal – second place	1996 Atlanta	4 × 200 m freestyle
Bronze medal – third place	1992 Barcelona	100 m freestyle
Bronze medal – third place	1992 Barcelona	4 × 100 m freestyle
Bronze medal – third place	1996 Atlanta	4 × 100 m freestyle
Bronze medal – third place	2000 Sydney	4 × 200 m freestyle
Bronze medal – third place	2004 Athens	4 × 100 m medley
Bronze medal – third place	2004 Athens	4 × 200 m freestyle
World Championships (LC)
Gold medal – first place	1994 Rome	200 m freestyle
Gold medal – first place	1998 Perth	4 × 200 m freestyle
Silver medal – second place	1994 Rome	4 × 200 m freestyle
Silver medal – second place	1998 Perth	4 × 100 m freestyle
Bronze medal – third place	1994 Rome	100 m freestyle
Bronze medal – third place	1994 Rome	4 × 100 m freestyle
World Championships (SC)
Silver medal – second place	1993 Rio	4 × 100 m freestyle
European Championships (LC)
Gold medal – first place	1993 Sheffield	50 m freestyle
Gold medal – first place	1993 Sheffield	100 m freestyle
Gold medal – first place	1993 Sheffield	200 m freestyle
Gold medal – first place	1993 Sheffield	4 × 100 m freestyle
Gold medal – first place	1993 Sheffield	4 × 200 m freestyle
Gold medal – first place	1993 Sheffield	4 × 100 m medley
Gold medal – first place	1995 Vienna	100 m freestyle
Gold medal – first place	1995 Vienna	400 m freestyle
Gold medal – first place	1995 Vienna	4 × 100 m freestyle
Gold medal – first place	1995 Vienna	4 × 200 m freestyle
Gold medal – first place	1995 Vienna	4 × 100 m medley
Gold medal – first place	1999 Istanbul	4 × 100 m freestyle
Gold medal – first place	1999 Istanbul	4 × 200 m freestyle
Gold medal – first place	2002 Berlin	100 m freestyle
Gold medal – first place	2002 Berlin	200 m freestyle
Gold medal – first place	2002 Berlin	4 × 100 m freestyle
Gold medal – first place	2002 Berlin	4 × 200 m freestyle
Gold medal – first place	2002 Berlin	4 × 100 m medley
Silver medal – second place	1993 Sheffield	100 m butterfly
Silver medal – second place	1995 Vienna	50 m freestyle
Silver medal – second place	1999 Istanbul	4 × 100 m medley
European Championships (SC)
Gold medal – first place	1992 Espoo	50 m freestyle
Gold medal – first place	1992 Espoo	4 × 50 m freestyle
Gold medal – first place	1992 Espoo	4 × 50 m medley
Gold medal – first place	1998 Sheffield	4 × 50 m medley
Silver medal – second place	1998 Sheffield	200 m freestyle

Franziska van Almsick (German pronunciation: [fʁanˈt͡sɪska fan ˈalmsɪk]; born 5 April 1978) is a retired German swimmer, former world record holder in 200 metres freestyle. She was multiple World and European champion, in both Long and Short Course Championships.

== Career ==
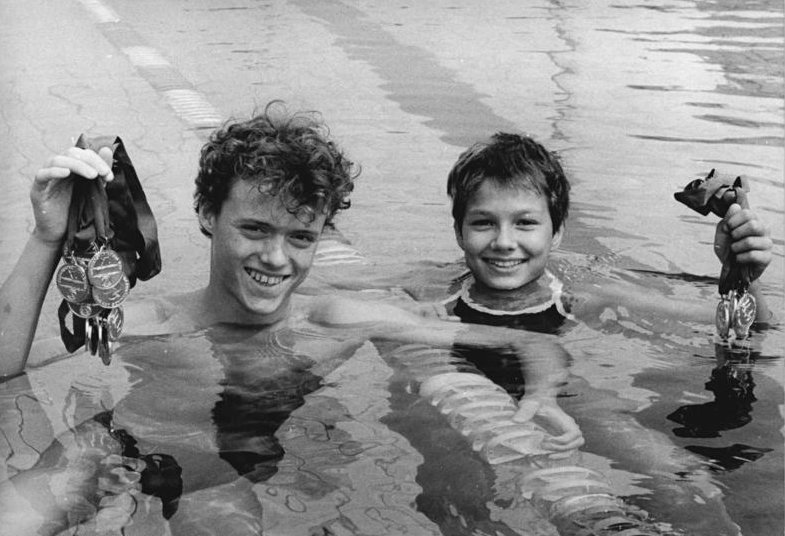
Jörg Hoffmann and van Almsick (11 years old) at the Children's and Youth Spartakiad in July 1989

Her career began at the SC Dynamo Berlin in East Germany. Franziska van Almsick won 2 gold medals at the World Championships, 18 gold medals at the European championships and 4 gold medals at the European championships (SC).

At the World Championships in 1994, her teammate Dagmar Hase qualified for the 200 metre freestyle final as the eight best swimmer, leaving Franziska only with the ninth best qualification time. Therefore, Hase abandoned her start place and offered it to van Almsick, who then won the gold medal in the final bettering the world record.

Franziska won her first Olympic medals in 1992 at the Barcelona Olympic Games aged only 14. She won a Silver and Bronze respectively in 200 m freestyle and 100 m freestyle. In other team events, she won a Silver and Bronze respectively in 4x100 m medley relay and 4x100 m freestyle relay for the German swimming team.

She has the distinction of having the most career Olympic medals, ten, without ever winning a gold medal. She ended her career at the Athens Olympic Games in 2004.

In 1993, she was named by Swimming World magazine as the Female World Swimmer of the Year.

In 1995, she was described by The New York Times as "the swimmer who united a nation", due to her status as "the first big star of German reunification".

== Personal life ==
She has two sons, born in 2006 and 2013. Her family resides in Heidelberg, Baden-Württemberg, Germany.

In 1993, evidence revealed that her mother Jutta, a sports coach, had been a Stasi informer, though Jutta disputed this.

== See also ==
- List of German records in swimming
- List of multiple Summer Olympic medalists
- List of multiple Olympic medalists at a single Games
- World record progression 50 metres freestyle
- World record progression 100 metres freestyle
- World record progression 200 metres freestyle
- Sport in Berlin

Records
Preceded by Heike Friedrich	Women's 200 metre freestyle world record holder (long course); 6 September 1994 – 27 March 2007	Succeeded by Federica Pellegrini
Awards
Preceded by Heike Henkel	German Sportswoman of the Year; 1993	Succeeded by Katja Seizinger
Preceded by Katja Seizinger	German Sportswoman of the Year; 1995	Succeeded by Katja Seizinger
Preceded by Hannah Stockbauer	German Sportswoman of the Year; 2002	Succeeded by Hannah Stockbauer
Preceded by Krisztina Egerszegi	World Swimmer of the Year; 1993	Succeeded by Samantha Riley
Preceded by Krisztina Egerszegi	European Swimmer of the Year; 1993–1994	Succeeded by Krisztina Egerszegi
Preceded by Inge de Bruijn	European Swimmer of the Year; 2002	Succeeded by Hannah Stockbauer
