= Linda Olofsson (swimmer) =

Swedish swimmer

Personal information
- Full name: Linda Susanne Olofsson
- Nationality: Sweden
- Born: 29 August 1972 (age 53) Piteå, Norrbotten

Sport
- Sport: Swimming
- Strokes: Freestyle
- Club: Södertälje SS
Medal record
World Championships (SC)
Silver medal – second place	1993 Palma	4×100 m freestyle
Bronze medal – third place	1993 Palma	100 m freestyle
Bronze medal – third place	1995 Rio de Janeiro	4×100 m freestyle
European Championships (LC)
Gold medal – first place	1995 Vienna	50 m freestyle
Silver medal – second place	1993 Sheffield	50 m freestyle
Silver medal – second place	1993 Sheffield	4x100 m freestyle
Silver medal – second place	1995 Vienna	4x100 m freestyle
European Championships (SC)
Silver medal – second place	1993 Gateshead	50 m freestyle
Silver medal – second place	1993 Gateshead	4×50 m medley
Silver medal – second place	1996 Rostock	4×50 m freestyle
Bronze medal – third place	1996 Rostock	4×50 m medley

Linda Susanne Andersson (née Olofsson; born 29 August 1972) is a Swedish former freestyle swimmer who competed at the Summer Olympics in 1992 and 1996, both in the women's 50 m freestyle and the women's 4×100 m freestyle.

Born in Piteå, Norrbotten, Olofsson represented Sundsvalls SS and Södertälje SS.
