= Samantha Riley =

Australian swimmer

Personal information
- Full name: Samantha Linette Pearl Riley
- National team: Australia
- Born: 13 November 1972 (age 53) Brisbane, Queensland
- Height: 1.60 m (5 ft 3 in)
- Weight: 59 kg (130 lb)

Sport
- Sport: Swimming
- Strokes: Breaststroke
- Club: Commercial Swimming Club
Medal record
Women's swimming
Representing Australia
Olympic Games
Silver medal – second place	1996 Atlanta	4×100m medley
Bronze medal – third place	1992 Barcelona	100m breaststroke
Bronze medal – third place	1996 Atlanta	100m breaststroke
World Championships (LC)
Gold medal – first place	1994 Rome	100m breaststroke
Gold medal – first place	1994 Rome	200m breaststroke
World Championships (SC)
Gold medal – first place	1995 Rio	100m breaststroke
Gold medal – first place	1995 Rio	200m breaststroke
Gold medal – first place	1995 Rio	4x100m medley
Silver medal – second place	1999 Hong Kong	4x100m medley
Bronze medal – third place	1993 Palma	100m breaststroke
Bronze medal – third place	1993 Palma	200m breaststroke
Bronze medal – third place	1999 Hong Kong	100m breaststroke
Pan Pacific Championships
Gold medal – first place	1995 Atlanta	200m breaststroke
Gold medal – first place	1995 Atlanta	4x100m medley
Gold medal – first place	1997 Fukuoka	100m breaststroke
Gold medal – first place	1997 Fukuoka	200m breaststroke
Silver medal – second place	1991 Edmonton	100m breaststroke
Silver medal – second place	1991 Edmonton	200m breaststroke
Silver medal – second place	1993 Kobe	100m breaststroke
Silver medal – second place	1993 Kobe	4x100m medley
Silver medal – second place	1997 Fukuoka	4x100m medley
Commonwealth Games
Gold medal – first place	1994 Victoria	100m breaststroke
Gold medal – first place	1994 Victoria	200m breaststroke
Gold medal – first place	1994 Victoria	4x100m medley
Gold medal – first place	1998 K.Lumpur	200m breaststroke
Silver medal – second place	1998 K.Lumpur	100m breaststroke

Samantha Linette Pearl Riley OAM (born 13 November 1972) is an Australian former competitive swimmer. She is of Aboriginal descent. She specialised in breaststroke and competed for Australia in the 1992 Summer Olympics in Barcelona and the 1996 Summer Olympics in Atlanta, winning three medals. She trained under Scott Volkers at the Commercial Swimming Club in Brisbane. She was the first Indigenous Australian to win an Olympic medal.

== Swimming career ==
Having been advised as a child to begin swimming to combat asthma, the Brisbane schoolgirl broke into the Australian team for the 1991 World Championships in Perth, Western Australia, winning a silver medal in the medley relay. The following year, Riley won a bronze medal in the 100-metre breaststroke at the 1992 Barcelona Olympics, as well as competing in the 200-metre event.

In 1994, Riley won both breaststroke events at the 1994 Commonwealth Games in Victoria, British Columbia, and repeated the feat at the 1994 World Championships in Rome, Italy, setting a world record of 1 minute, 07.69 seconds in the 100-metre event. This prompted Swimming World magazine to name her as the Female World Swimmer of the Year.

Riley continued to sweep all before her in 1995, but arrived for the 1996 Summer Olympics under the cloud of a doping controversy. Her coach, Scott Volkers, had given her a pill for headaches which contained the banned substance dextropropoxyphene. Riley tested positive at the world short course championships in Rio de Janeiro, and was only exonerated after her coach Volkers admitted to giving her a headache tablet which contained the banned substance. Riley told a news conference the drug was contained in headache medication she took by accident. Under the pressure of the controversy, Riley performed well outside her personal best times. She collected a bronze in the 100m breaststroke. She also collected a silver medal in the 4x100-metre relay with Nicole Stevenson, Susie O'Neill and Sarah Ryan.

Riley never stood on the podium again as an individual at the world level, but maintained her position in the Australian squad. Many anticipated her to return to her peak at the 2000 Summer Olympics in Sydney, but a kidney infection disrupted her training. She retired shortly after being Australia's most successful female breaststroke swimmer in the 1990s.

== Personal life ==
At one stage during the mid-1990s, Riley was engaged to Norwegian Olympic champion speedskater Johann Olav Koss. She was also engaged at one time to rugby league player Julian O'Neill.

The major arterial Samantha Riley Drive in Kellyville is named after her. The Australian Olympic Committee recognised her in their list of Australian Indigenous Olympians.

In March 2023, it was reported that Riley had split from her husband of 22 years, former Ironman champion Tim Fydler. They have three children.

== See also ==
- List of Olympic medalists in swimming (women)
- List of Commonwealth Games medallists in swimming (women)
- World record progression 100 metres breaststroke
- World record progression 200 metres breaststroke

Awards
Preceded by Franziska van Almsick	Swimming World; World Swimmer of the Year; 1994	Succeeded by Krisztina Egerszegi
Preceded by Le Jingyi	Swimming World; Pacific Rim Swimmer of the Year; 1997	Succeeded by Susie O'Neill
