= Le Jingyi =

Chinese swimmer (born 1975)

Personal information
- Full name: 乐靖宜
- Nationality: China
- Born: March 19, 1975 (age 51) Shanghai, China
- Height: 178 cm (5 ft 10 in)
- Weight: 68 kg (150 lb)

Sport
- Sport: Swimming
- Strokes: Freestyle
Medal record
Women's swimming
Representing China
Olympic Games
Gold medal – first place	1996 Atlanta	100 m freestyle
Silver medal – second place	1992 Barcelona	4×100 m freestyle
Silver medal – second place	1996 Atlanta	50 m freestyle
Silver medal – second place	1996 Atlanta	4×100 m freestyle
World Championships (LC)
Gold medal – first place	1994 Rome	50 m freestyle
Gold medal – first place	1994 Rome	100 m freestyle
Gold medal – first place	1994 Rome	4×100 m freestyle
Gold medal – first place	1994 Rome	4×100 m medley
World Championships (SC)
Gold medal – first place	1993 Palma	50 m freestyle
Gold medal – first place	1993 Palma	100 m freestyle
Gold medal – first place	1993 Palma	4×100 m freestyle
Gold medal – first place	1993 Palma	4×200 m freestyle
Gold medal – first place	1993 Palma	4×100 m medley
Gold medal – first place	1995 Rio	50 m freestyle
Gold medal – first place	1995 Rio	100 m freestyle
Gold medal – first place	1995 Rio	4×100 m freestyle
Gold medal – first place	1997 Gothenburg	4×100 m freestyle
Gold medal – first place	1997 Gothenburg	4×100 m medley
Bronze medal – third place	1997 Gothenburg	50 m freestyle
Bronze medal – third place	1997 Gothenburg	100 m freestyle
Pan Pacific Championships
Gold medal – first place	1997 Fukuoka	50 m freestyle
Silver medal – second place	1997 Fukuoka	100 m freestyle
Silver medal – second place	1997 Fukuoka	200 m freestyle
Summer Universiade
Gold medal – first place	1993 Buffalo	50 m freestyle
Gold medal – first place	1993 Buffalo	100 m freestyle

Le Jingyi (simplified Chinese: 乐靖宜; traditional Chinese: 樂靖宜; pinyin: Lè Jìngyí; born March 19, 1975, in Shanghai) is a former swimmer from China who won the gold medal in the 100 metres freestyle at the 1996 Summer Olympics in Atlanta, USA.

In 1992, Le won the silver medal in the 4×100 metres freestyle relay (3:40.12) at the 1992 Summer Olympics in Barcelona, and also finished 6th in the 100 m free (55.89). In 1993 she defeated her teammate, Olympic champion Zhuang Yong, to become national champion in the 100 m free (54.72, 2nd globally after Franziska van Almsick). In December 1993, she won 4 golds, all in world record times, at the first World Short Course Championships in Spain (50 m free: 24.23; 100 m free: 53.01; 4×100 m free relay: 3:35.97 and 4×100 m medley reply: 3:57.73).

She won the title in the 100 metres freestyle at the 1994 World Aquatics Championships in Rome, setting a world record with a time of 54.01 seconds. She also set a world record in the 50 metres freestyle (24.51) and anchored two world record-setting relays. She also won 3 golds in the 1995 Short Course Worlds in Brazil.

At the Atlanta Olympics, she won the 100 m freestyle (54.50) and won silver medals in the 4×100 metres freestyle relay (3:40.48) and the 50 metres freestyle (24.90).

Le continued to compete in 1997, winning the 50 m freestyle (25.24) and taking silver in the 10 0m (54.86) and 200 m (2:00.54) at the Pan Pacific Championships. At the 1997 Chinese National Games, she was upset by Shan Ying in the 50 m (24.71 to 24.88), though she took gold in the 100 m (54.10, 2nd fastest all-time).

Le competed at the 1998 World Championships in Perth but only swam in relays. She recorded the slowest split (57.59) among all 32 swimmers in the 4×100 m free relay final, where the Chinese team placed 8th.

In 2000, Le made an attempt to qualify for her third Olympics but was off-form to make it into the team.

While Le had been Olympic champion and world champion many times, she had never won a medal at the Asian Games. She competed in the 1994 Games in Hiroshima, entering the 50 m free and 4×100 m free relay. In the 50 free, she set a Games record (25.26) in the heats but was disqualified in the final for a false start. In the 4×100 m free relay, the Chinese team won (Le swam the 2nd leg and split 54.14) but was subsequently stripped of their gold when Lu Bin failed a doping test.

She was the face of the rising power of Chinese swimming in the mid-1990s. Due to her muscular build, she was one of many Chinese swimmers suspected of using steroids during the 1990s. Though several others were later found guilty of doping, she never tested positive for any illegal substances.

== See also ==
- World record progression 50 metres freestyle

Awards
Preceded by Yang Wenyi	Women's 50 metre freestyle world record holder (long course); September 11, 1994 – May 26, 2000	Succeeded by Inge de Bruijn
Preceded by Jenny Thompson	Women's 100 metre freestyle world record holder (long course); Sep 5, 1994 – May 28, 2000	Succeeded by Inge de Bruijn
Preceded by Wang Junxia	United Press International; Athlete of the Year; 1994	Succeeded by Gwen Torrence
Preceded by Susie O'Neill	World Pacific Rim Swimmer of the Year; 1996	Succeeded by Samantha Riley
