= Karen Pickering =

British swimmer (born 1971)

Karen Pickering MBE
Personal information
- Full name: Karen Denise Pickering
- Nationality: British
- Born: 19 December 1971 (age 54) Brighton and Hove, East Sussex
- Height: 1.77 m (5 ft 9 1/2 in)

Sport
- Sport: Swimming
- Strokes: Freestyle
- Club: Ipswich Swim Club
Medal record
World Championships – Long Course
Gold medal – first place	2001 Fukuoka	4×200 m freestyle
Silver medal – second place	2001 Fukuoka	4×100 m freestyle
World Championships – Short Course
Gold medal – first place	1993 Palma	200 m freestyle
Gold medal – first place	1999 Hong Kong	4×100 m freestyle
Gold medal – first place	2000 Athens	4×200 m freestyle
Silver medal – second place	1999 Hong Kong	4×200 m freestyle
Bronze medal – third place	1993 Palma	100 m freestyle
Bronze medal – third place	2000 Athens	4×100 m freestyle
European Championships – Long Course
Bronze medal – third place	1993 Sheffield	200 m freestyle
Bronze medal – third place	1993 Sheffield	4×200 m freestyle
Bronze medal – third place	1993 Sheffield	4×100 m medley
Bronze medal – third place	1995 Vienna	100 m freestyle
Bronze medal – third place	1995 Vienna	200 m freestyle
Bronze medal – third place	1995 Vienna	4×100 m freestyle
Bronze medal – third place	1997 Seville	4×100 m medley
Bronze medal – third place	1999 Istanbul	4×100 m freestyle
Bronze medal – third place	1999 Istanbul	4×100 m medley
European Championships – Short Course
Silver medal – second place	2000 Valencia	200 m freestyle
Silver medal – second place	2000 Valencia	4×50 m freestyle
Bronze medal – third place	1998 Sheffield	4×50 m freestyle
Bronze medal – third place	1999 Lisbon	4×50 m freestyle
Representing England
Commonwealth Games
Gold medal – first place	1994 Victoria	100 m freestyle
Gold medal – first place	1994 Victoria	4×100 m freestyle
Gold medal – first place	2002 Manchester	200 m freestyle
Gold medal – first place	2002 Manchester	4×200 m freestyle
Silver medal – second place	1990 Auckland	4×100 m medley
Silver medal – second place	1994 Victoria	4×100 m medley
Silver medal – second place	1994 Victoria	4×200 m freestyle
Silver medal – second place	1998 Kuala Lumpur	200 m freestyle
Silver medal – second place	1998 Kuala Lumpur	4×100 m freestyle
Silver medal – second place	1998 Kuala Lumpur	4×200 m freestyle
Silver medal – second place	2002 Manchester	4×100 m freestyle
Bronze medal – third place	1990 Auckland	4×100 m freestyle
Bronze medal – third place	1994 Victoria	200 m freestyle

Karen Denise Pickering, MBE (born 19 December 1971) is a former competitive freestyle swimmer from Great Britain. Pickering was the first woman to win an individual World Championship gold medal in swimming for Great Britain at the 1993 FINA Short Course World Championships in the 200 metre freestyle, and was part of the team that won relay gold three times for Great Britain in both long course (2001) and short course (1999, 2000) world championships.

Swimming for England, she is a four-time Commonwealth Games champion, including individual titles in the 100 metre freestyle (1994) and 200 metre freestyle (2002).

== Swimming career ==
She made her international senior debut in 1986. She was first selected to represent her country at the European Junior Championships. Pickering competed in four consecutive Summer Olympics, starting in 1992.

She won her first medal in 1993, at the inaugural 1993 FINA Short Course World Championships in Palma de Mallorca, where she won the gold medal in the 200 m freestyle. With that performance Pickering became Britain's first swimming world champion.

She was a member of the British swimming squad from 1986 to 2005 and has a collection that includes 8 World Championship medals (4 gold), 14 European Championship medals, 38 National Championship titles, and a Commonwealth Games medal haul of 13 including 4 gold. The 2002 Commonwealth Games saw Karen win three medals, two gold and one silver, in front of her home crowd, a career highlight which was crowned with the honour of carrying the English flag at the closing ceremony.

She is a two times winner of the British Championship in the 50 metres freestyle (1992 and 1993), seven times winner of the 100 metres freestyle (1989-1993, 1997, 2000), nine times winner of the 200 metres freestyle (1990, 1992–1995, 1997, 1999 and 2002–2003) and was the 400 metres freestyle champion in 1992, 2002 and 2003.

== Honours ==
For her services to swimming Karen was awarded an MBE in the 1994 New Years Honours List.

Pickering is now the Sports Ambassador for Ipswich in Suffolk, and chaired the British Athletes Commission between 2004 and 2016.

== See also ==
- List of World Aquatics Championships medalists in swimming (women)
- List of Commonwealth Games medallists in swimming (women)
- World record progression 4 × 200 metres freestyle relay
