= Silvia Parera =

Spanish swimmer

Medal record

Women's swimming

European Championships (LC)
Bronze medal – third place	1993 Sheffield	200 m individual medley

Silvia Parera Carrau (born 5 September 1969 in Mataró, Catalonia) is a former medley and breaststroke swimmer from Spain, who competed at three consecutive Summer Olympics for her native country, starting in 1988 in Seoul, South Korea.

Her clubs were CN Premià, CN Mataró, CN Sant Andreu, CN Catalunya and CN Mediterrani.
