= Allison Wagner =

American swimmer (born 1977)

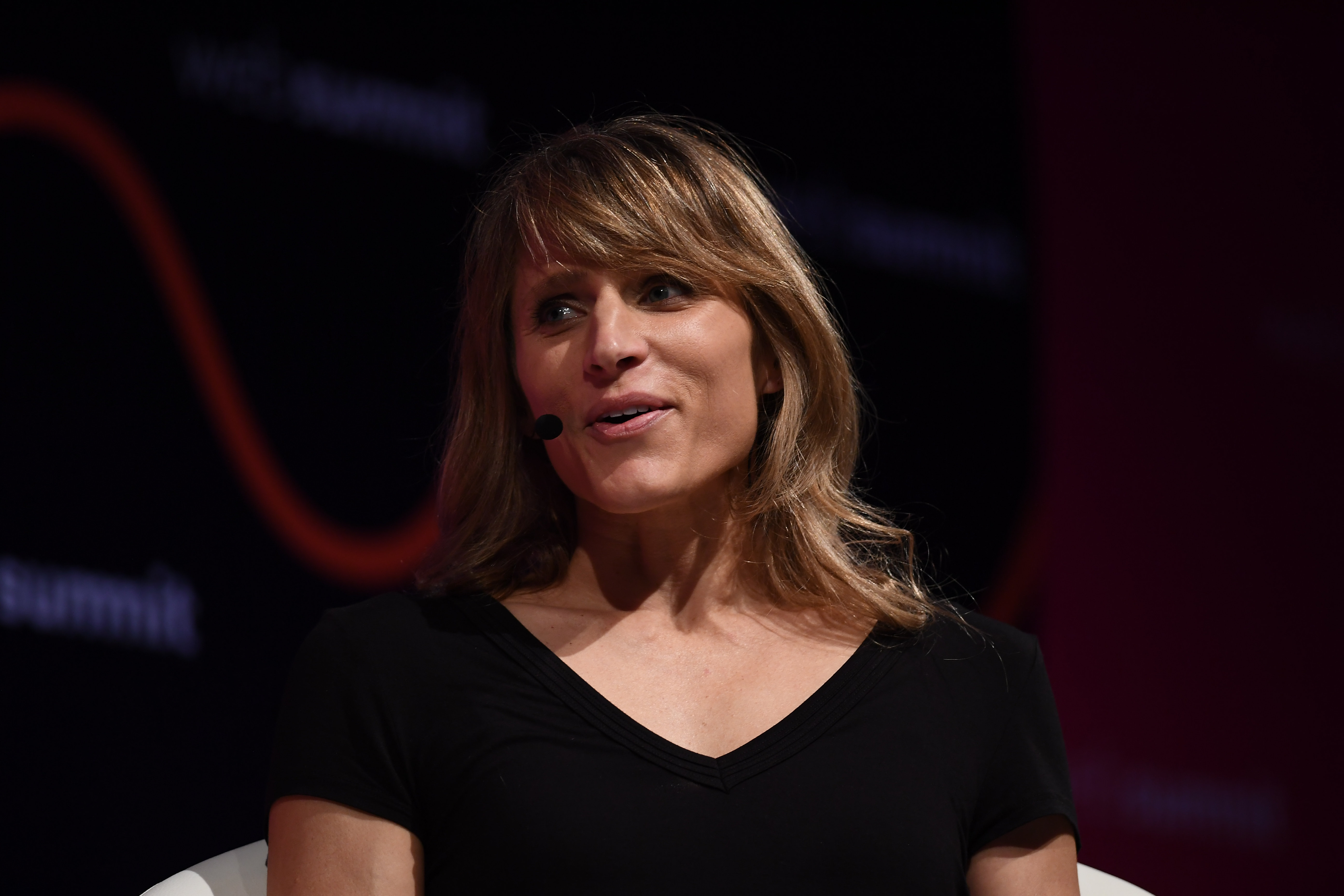

Personal information
- Full name: Allison Marie Wagner
- National team: United States
- Born: July 21, 1977 (age 48) Gainesville, Florida, U.S.
- Height: 5 ft 6 in (1.68 m)
- Weight: 117 lb (53 kg)

Sport
- Sport: Swimming
- Strokes: Individual medley
- Club: Florida Aquatics Swim Team (FAST)
- College team: University of Florida
Medal record
Women's swimming
Representing the United States
Olympic Games
Silver medal – second place	1996 Atlanta	400 m medley
World Championships (LC)
Silver medal – second place	1994 Rome	200 m medley
Silver medal – second place	1994 Rome	400 m medley
World Championships (SC)
Gold medal – first place	1993 Palma	200 m medley
Silver medal – second place	1993 Palma	400 m medley
Pan Pacific Championships
Gold medal – first place	1993 Kobe	200 m medley
Silver medal – second place	1993 Kobe	400 m medley

Allison Marie Wagner (born July 21, 1977) is an American former competition swimmer, Olympic medalist, and former world record-holder.

== Early years ==
Wagner was born in Gainesville, Florida. Her parents required her and her two brothers to participate in sports. Her brothers picked American football and soccer; she attempted ballet, softball and soccer before discovering that she was good at swimming. At the age of 7, she began her competition swimming career in Berlin, Germany, where her father was stationed in the U.S. Army. After her father retired from army service, her family moved to Gainesville, and she attended the International Baccalaureate program at Eastside High School in Gainesville. While in high school, Wagner swam for the Eastside swim team for one semester, and trained for national and international competition with the Florida Aquatics club team under coach Kevin Thornton.

== Swimming career ==
Wagner won the gold medal in the 200-meter individual medley and the silver medal in the 400-meter individual medley at the 1993 FINA Short Course World Championships in Palma de Mallorca, Spain. Her winning time in the 200-meter medley (2:07.79) stood as the world record in the event for over fourteen years until Zimbabwe's Kirsty Coventry broke it at the World Short Course Championships in April 2008 in Manchester, England, when Coventry clocked 2:06.13.

Swimming World magazine named Wagner as its American Swimmer of the Year in January 1994—when she was only 16 years old. At the 1994 U.S. long-course championships held in August 1994, she won the national titles in the 200-meter and 400-meter individual medley events, as well as the 200-meter breaststroke.

Wagner graduated early from high school to accept an athletic scholarship to attend the University of Florida in Gainesville, where she swam for coach Chris Martin and coach Kevin Thornton's Florida Gators swimming and diving teams in National Collegiate Athletic Association (NCAA) competition from 1995 to 1998. As a Gator swimmer, she won seven Southeastern Conference (SEC) titles and the 1995 NCAA title in the 400-yard individual medley. Wagner was named the SEC Female Swimmer of the Year in 1995 and 1996 and the Gators' Most Valuable Swimmer in 1996, and received eleven All-American honors.

At the 1996 Summer Olympics in Atlanta, Georgia, Wagner won the silver medal in the 400-meter individual medley, finishing second behind Ireland's Michelle Smith. Four days later, she swam in the 200-meter individual medley and finished sixth.

On several occasions during Wagner's career, she was beaten in major championships by swimmers who were highly suspected or later proven to be users of banned performance-enhancing substances. Besides Michelle Smith in the 1996 Olympics, Wagner finished second behind China's Dai Guohong in the 1993 Short Course World Championships (200-meter individual medley) and China's Lü Bin at the 1994 Worlds (both 200-meter and 400-meter individual medley). Dai never failed a drug test, but Lu tested positive a few weeks after beating Wagner. Nevertheless, Lu was allowed to keep her 200-meter individual medley gold medal.

Wagner retired from competition swimming in 2000, but attempted a comeback in 2006–07.

== Artist ==
Wagner is a painter and founding member of the International Olympic organization called Art of the Olympians.

== See also ==
- List of Olympic medalists in swimming (women)
- List of University of Florida alumni
- List of University of Florida Olympians
- List of World Aquatics Championships medalists in swimming (women)
- World record progression 200 metres individual medley

Records
Preceded by Not previously recognized	Women's 200-meter individual medley world record-holder (short course); December 5, 1993 – April 12, 2008	Succeeded by Kirsty Coventry
Awards
Preceded by Jenny Thompson	Swimming World; American Swimmer of the Year; 1994	Succeeded by Amy Van Dyken
