= Shannon Shakespeare =

Canadian swimmer (born 1977)

Personal information
- Full name: Shannon Shakespeare
- National team: Canada
- Born: May 6, 1977 (age 49) Mission, British Columbia
- Height: 1.75 m (5 ft 9 in)
- Weight: 66 kg (146 lb)

Sport
- Sport: Swimming
- Strokes: Freestyle
- Club: Manitoba Marlins
- College team: University of Michigan
Medal record
Women's swimming
Representing Canada
World Championships (SC)
Gold medal – first place	1995 Rio	4x200 m freestyle
Silver medal – second place	1995 Rio	4x100 m medley
Pan Pacific Championships
Silver medal – second place	1997 Fukuoka	4x100 m medley
Bronze medal – third place	1993 Kobe	4x100 m freestyle
Bronze medal – third place	1995 Atlanta	4x200 m freestyle
Commonwealth Games
Bronze medal – third place	1994 Victoria	50 m freestyle
Bronze medal – third place	1994 Victoria	4x100 m freestyle
Pan American Games
Silver medal – second place	1995 Mar del Plata	50 m freestyle
Silver medal – second place	1995 Mar del Plata	4x100 m freestyle
Silver medal – second place	1995 Mar del Plata	4x200 m freestyle
Silver medal – second place	1995 Mar del Plata	4x100 m medley

Shannon Shakespeare (born May 6, 1977) is a Canadian former competitive swimmer and freestyle specialist. Shakespeare competed for Canada at two consecutive Summer Olympics in 1996 and 2000. At the 1996 Summer Olympics in Atlanta, Georgia, she finished in 17th position in the 100-metre freestyle, 5th place in the 4x200 metre freestyle and 4x100 metre medley relays, and 7th place in the 4x100 metre freestyle relay. A key member of the Canadian women's relay teams in the 1990s, Shakespeare won a gold medal in the 4x200 metre freestyle relay at the 1995 World Championships. She also won a bronze medal in the 50-metre freestyle and 4x100-metre freestyle relay in the 1994 Commonwealth Games. She was the Canadian champion in the women's 50, 100, and 200-metre freestyle, and a 23-time All American while swimming at the University of Michigan.

Shakespeare was inducted into the Manitoba Sports Hall of Fame in 2013.

== See also ==
- List of World Aquatics Championships medalists in swimming (women)
- List of Commonwealth Games medallists in swimming (women)
