= Lü Bin (swimmer) =

Chinese swimmer (born 1977)

Medal record

Women's swimming

Representing China

Olympic Games
Silver medal – second place	1992 Barcelona	4×100 m freestyle

World Championships (LC)
Gold medal – first place	1994 Rome	200 m medley
Gold medal – first place	1994 Rome	4×100 m freestyle
Gold medal – first place	1994 Rome	4×200 m freestyle
Silver medal – second place	1994 Rome	100 m freestyle
Silver medal – second place	1994 Rome	200 m freestyle

World Championships (SC)
Gold medal – first place	1993 Palma	4×100 m freestyle
Gold medal – first place	1993 Palma	4×200 m freestyle

Lü Bin (Chinese: 吕彬; born January 7, 1977) is a former female freestyle and medley swimmer from China. Her best performance was winning the silver medal in the 4×100 m freestyle at the 1992 Summer Olympics in Barcelona, Spain.
