= Marianne Kriel =

South African swimmer

Personal information
- Born: August 30, 1971 (age 54) Bellville, Western Cape
Medal record
Women's swimming
Representing South Africa
Bronze medal – third place	1996 Atlanta	100 m backstroke

Marianne Kriel (born August 30, 1971, in Bellville, Western Cape) is a former backstroke and freestyle swimmer from South Africa, who won the bronze medal in the 100 m backstroke at the 1996 Summer Olympics in Atlanta, Georgia. Met with Nelson Mandela.

She spent some time training at Southern Methodist University (SMU) where she met close friends Tia Gibson and her daughters Meg and Katie.

Kriel also participated in the 1992 Summer Olympics in Barcelona, Spain, and received the President's Award in 1993 and 1996. Kriel was the first woman to captain a multi-code team to the 1994 Commonwealth Games and the 1995 All-Africa Games.

Kriel grew up in Bellville (near Cape Town) where she attended Bellville High School. She continued to be a role model to her fellow pupils of all races and backgrounds, in a way playing a big role in the unification of South Africa's youth.

== See also ==
- List of Olympic medalists in swimming (women)
