= He Cihong =

Chinese swimmer (born 1975)

Personal information
- National team: China
- Born: June 6, 1975 (age 51) China

Sport
- Sport: Swimming
- Strokes: Backstroke

He Cihong (born 6 June 1975) is a Chinese former swimmer who competed in the 1992 Summer Olympics and in the 1996 Summer Olympics.

At the 1994 FINA World Championships, she won the 100- and 200-meter backstroke events, setting the meet record in the women's 100 back at 1:00.16.

== See also ==
- World record progression 100 metres backstroke
- World record progression 200 metres backstroke
