= Angel Martino =

American swimmer (born 1967)

Personal information
- Full name: Angelina Myers Martino
- Nickname: "Angel"
- National team: United States
- Born: April 25, 1967 (age 59) Tuscaloosa, Alabama, U.S.
- Height: 5 ft 5 in (1.65 m)
- Weight: 150 lb (68 kg)

Sport
- Sport: Swimming
- Strokes: Butterfly, freestyle
- Club: Americus Blue Tide
- College team: Furman University
Medal record
Women's swimming
Representing United States
Olympic Games
Gold medal – first place	1992 Barcelona	4×100 m freestyle
Gold medal – first place	1996 Atlanta	4×100 m freestyle
Gold medal – first place	1996 Atlanta	4×100 m medley
Bronze medal – third place	1992 Barcelona	50 m freestyle
Bronze medal – third place	1996 Atlanta	100 m butterfly
Bronze medal – third place	1996 Atlanta	100 m freestyle
World Championships (LC)
Silver medal – second place	1994 Rome	4×100 m freestyle
World Championships (SC)
Gold medal – first place	1993 Palma	100 m backstroke
Silver medal – second place	1993 Palma	50 m freestyle
Silver medal – second place	1993 Palma	100 m freestyle
Bronze medal – third place	1993 Palma	4×100 m freestyle
Bronze medal – third place	1993 Palma	4×100 m medley
Pan Pacific Championships
Gold medal – first place	1987 Brisbane	200 m medley
Gold medal – first place	1991 Edmonton	100 m freestyle
Gold medal – first place	1991 Edmonton	4×100 m freestyle
Gold medal – first place	1993 Kobe	4×100 m freestyle
Gold medal – first place	1993 Kobe	4×100 m medley
Gold medal – first place	1995 Atlanta	4×100 m freestyle
Silver medal – second place	1987 Brisbane	100 m butterfly
Silver medal – second place	1991 Edmonton	50 m freestyle
Silver medal – second place	1993 Kobe	50 m freestyle
Bronze medal – third place	1993 Kobe	100 m freestyle
Pan American Games
Gold medal – first place	1995 Mar del Plata	50 m freestyle
Gold medal – first place	1995 Mar del Plata	100 m freestyle
Gold medal – first place	1995 Mar del Plata	4×100 m freestyle
Gold medal – first place	1995 Mar del Plata	4×100 m medley

Angelina Myers Martino (born April 25, 1967), now known as Angel Sims, is an American former competition swimmer, three-time Olympic champion, and former world record-holder. Over her career, she won three Olympic gold medals and three bronze medals.

In 2001, she was inducted into the Georgia Sports Hall of Fame.

== See also ==
- List of multiple Olympic gold medalists
- List of Olympic medalists in swimming (women)
- List of World Aquatics Championships medalists in swimming (women)
- World record progression 100 metres backstroke
- World record progression 4 × 100 metres freestyle relay
