= World Aquatics Swimming Championships (25m) =

International swimming competition

The World Aquatics Swimming Championships (25m), formerly known as the FINA World Swimming Championships (25m), also referred to as World Short Course Championships, are an international swimming competition staged by the internationally recognized governing body of the sport, World Aquatics (formerly FINA). The championships are staged in a 25m pool, referred to as short course format, and traditionally have been held biennially in alternate years to the World Aquatics Championships. Unlike the World Aquatics Championships, only swimming events are staged at these championships (being one of the six disciplines that form part of the World Aquatics Championships).

== Editions ==
Member federations referred to as winners, second, and third, in the table below, are the top three nation's listed on the medal tally based on the standard method of ranking (being total gold medals, followed by total silver medals, and then total bronze medals).

Edition	Year	Dates	Host	Nations	Events	Winner	Second	Third
1	1993	December 2 – 5	Palma de Mallorca, Spain	46	32	China	United States	Australia
2	1995	November 30 – December 3	Rio de Janeiro, Brazil	57	32	Australia	China	Brazil
3	1997	April 17 – 20	Gothenburg, Sweden	71	32	Australia	China	Sweden
4	1999	April 1 – 4	Hung Hom Bay, Hong Kong, China	61	40	Australia	Japan	Great Britain
5	2000	March 16 – 19	Athens, Greece	78	40	United States	Sweden	Germany
6	2002	April 3 – 7	Moscow, Russia	92	40	Australia	United States	Sweden
7	2004	October 7 – 11	Indianapolis, United States	94	40	United States	Australia	Great Britain
8	2006	April 5 – 9	Shanghai, China	117	40	Australia	United States	China
9	2008	April 9 – 13	(United Kingdom) Manchester, Great Britain	116	40	United States	Australia	Netherlands
10	2010	December 15 – 19	Dubai, United Arab Emirates	153	40	United States	Russia	Spain
11	2012	December 12 – 16	Istanbul, Turkey	162	40	United States	China	Hungary
12	2014	December 3 – 7	Doha, Qatar	174	46	Brazil	Hungary	Netherlands
13	2016	December 6 – 11	Windsor, Canada	172	46	United States	Hungary	Russia
14	2018	December 11 – 16	Hangzhou, China	175	46	United States	Russia	Hungary
15	2021	December 16 – 21	Abu Dhabi, United Arab Emirates	183	46	United States	Canada	Italy
16	2022	December 13 – 18	Melbourne, Australia	154	48	United States	Australia	Italy
17	2024	December 10 – 15	Budapest, Hungary	189	45	United States	Neutral Athletes B	Canada
18	2026	December 1 – 6	Beijing, China					

- Record by number of gold medals – United States (21 gold medals, 2004)
- Record by number of total medals – United States (41 medals in total, 2004)

== Events ==
The 2022 championships were the first edition of the championships in which the male and female event programs were identical. Mixed relays were added from the 2014 edition of the championships.

=== Men's events ===
Edition		1993	1995	1997	1999	2000	2002	2004	2006	2008	2010	2012	2014	2016	2018	2021	2022	2024
Freestyle	50 m	X	X	X	X	X	X	X	X	X	X	X	X	X	X	X	X	X
Freestyle	100 m	X	X	X	X	X	X	X	X	X	X	X	X	X	X	X	X	X
Freestyle	200 m	X	X	X	X	X	X	X	X	X	X	X	X	X	X	X	X	X
Freestyle	400 m	X	X	X	X	X	X	X	X	X	X	X	X	X	X	X	X	X
Freestyle	800 m																X	X
Freestyle	1500 m	X	X	X	X	X	X	X	X	X	X	X	X	X	X	X	X	X
Backstroke	50 m				X	X	X	X	X	X	X	X	X	X	X	X	X	X
Backstroke	100 m	X	X	X	X	X	X	X	X	X	X	X	X	X	X	X	X	X
Backstroke	200 m	X	X	X	X	X	X	X	X	X	X	X	X	X	X	X	X	X
Breaststroke	50 m				X	X	X	X	X	X	X	X	X	X	X	X	X	X
Breaststroke	100 m	X	X	X	X	X	X	X	X	X	X	X	X	X	X	X	X	X
Breaststroke	200 m	X	X	X	X	X	X	X	X	X	X	X	X	X	X	X	X	X
Butterfly	50 m				X	X	X	X	X	X	X	X	X	X	X	X	X	X
Butterfly	100 m	X	X	X	X	X	X	X	X	X	X	X	X	X	X	X	X	X
Butterfly	200 m	X	X	X	X	X	X	X	X	X	X	X	X	X	X	X	X	X
Individual medley	100 m				X	X	X	X	X	X	X	X	X	X	X	X	X	X
Individual medley	200 m	X	X	X	X	X	X	X	X	X	X	X	X	X	X	X	X	X
Individual medley	400 m	X	X	X	X	X	X	X	X	X	X	X	X	X	X	X	X	X
Freestyle relays	4 × 50 m												X	X	X	X	X	
Freestyle relays	4 × 100 m	X	X	X	X	X	X	X	X	X	X	X	X	X	X	X	X	X
Freestyle relays	4 × 200 m	X	X	X	X	X	X	X	X	X	X	X	X	X	X	X	X	X
Medley relays	4 × 50 m												X	X	X	X	X	
Medley relays	4 × 100 m	X	X	X	X	X	X	X	X	X	X	X	X	X	X	X	X	X
Number of events		16	16	16	20	20	20	20	20	20	20	20	22	22	22	22	23	21

=== Women's events ===
Edition		1993	1995	1997	1999	2000	2002	2004	2006	2008	2010	2012	2014	2016	2018	2021	2022	2024
Freestyle	50 m	X	X	X	X	X	X	X	X	X	X	X	X	X	X	X	X	X
Freestyle	100 m	X	X	X	X	X	X	X	X	X	X	X	X	X	X	X	X	X
Freestyle	200 m	X	X	X	X	X	X	X	X	X	X	X	X	X	X	X	X	X
Freestyle	400 m	X	X	X	X	X	X	X	X	X	X	X	X	X	X	X	X	X
Freestyle	800 m	X	X	X	X	X	X	X	X	X	X	X	X	X	X	X	X	X
Freestyle	1500 m																X	X
Backstroke	50 m				X	X	X	X	X	X	X	X	X	X	X	X	X	X
Backstroke	100 m	X	X	X	X	X	X	X	X	X	X	X	X	X	X	X	X	X
Backstroke	200 m	X	X	X	X	X	X	X	X	X	X	X	X	X	X	X	X	X
Breaststroke	50 m				X	X	X	X	X	X	X	X	X	X	X	X	X	X
Breaststroke	100 m	X	X	X	X	X	X	X	X	X	X	X	X	X	X	X	X	X
Breaststroke	200 m	X	X	X	X	X	X	X	X	X	X	X	X	X	X	X	X	X
Butterfly	50 m				X	X	X	X	X	X	X	X	X	X	X	X	X	X
Butterfly	100 m	X	X	X	X	X	X	X	X	X	X	X	X	X	X	X	X	X
Butterfly	200 m	X	X	X	X	X	X	X	X	X	X	X	X	X	X	X	X	X
Individual medley	100 m				X	X	X	X	X	X	X	X	X	X	X	X	X	X
Individual medley	200 m	X	X	X	X	X	X	X	X	X	X	X	X	X	X	X	X	X
Individual medley	400 m	X	X	X	X	X	X	X	X	X	X	X	X	X	X	X	X	X
Freestyle relays	4 × 50 m												X	X	X	X	X	
Freestyle relays	4 × 100 m	X	X	X	X	X	X	X	X	X	X	X	X	X	X	X	X	X
Freestyle relays	4 × 200 m	X	X	X	X	X	X	X	X	X	X	X	X	X	X	X	X	X
Medley relays	4 × 50 m												X	X	X	X	X	
Medley relays	4 × 100 m	X	X	X	X	X	X	X	X	X	X	X	X	X	X	X	X	X
Number of events		16	16	16	20	20	20	20	20	20	20	20	22	22	22	22	23	21

=== Mixed events ===
Edition		2014	2016	2018	2021	2022	2024
Relays	4 × 50 m freestyle	X	X	X	X	X	X
Relays	4 × 50 m medley	X	X	X	X	X	X
Relays	4 × 100 m medley						X
Number of events		2	2	2	2	2	3

== All-time medal table ==
Updated after the 2024 World Aquatics Swimming Championships (25 m).

Rank	Nation	Gold	Silver	Bronze	Total
1	United States	172	138	110	420
2	Australia	93	104	86	283
3	China	49	43	43	135
4	Sweden	32	25	22	79
5	Russia	29	28	43	100
6	Netherlands	24	28	28	80
7	Brazil	24	11	24	59
8	Great Britain	22	42	46	110
9	South Africa	22	17	8	47
10	Hungary	22	13	11	46
11	Germany	21	29	27	77
12	Japan	21	15	24	60
13	Canada	20	32	31	83
14	Italy	17	41	33	91
15	Ukraine	15	12	14	41
16	Denmark	10	5	16	31
17	Spain	10	4	8	22
18	France	8	15	11	34
19	Slovakia	7	5	5	17
20	Lithuania	6	5	4	15
21	Neutral Athletes B	6	4	0	10
22	Cuba	6	1	2	9
23	Finland	5	5	4	14
24	South Korea	5	2	0	7
25	Croatia	5	1	3	9
26	Poland	4	7	21	32
27	Russian Swimming Federation	4	7	4	15
28	Jamaica	4	4	2	10
29	Venezuela	4	2	1	7
30	Zimbabwe	4	0	1	5
31	Costa Rica	4	0	0	4
32	New Zealand	3	7	5	15
33	Slovenia	3	7	3	13
34	Tunisia	3	3	3	9
35	Switzerland	3	2	7	12
36	Belarus	3	2	3	8
37	Hong Kong	3	2	1	6
38	Austria	2	7	2	11
39	Israel	2	0	2	4
40	Cayman Islands	2	0	1	3
41	Norway	1	3	4	8
42	Argentina	1	2	2	5
43	Kazakhstan	1	0	3	4
44	Romania	0	3	3	6
45	Czech Republic	0	2	1	3
46	Ireland	0	1	3	4
47	Trinidad and Tobago	0	1	2	3
47	Turkey	0	1	2	3
49	Algeria	0	1	1	2
50	Moldova	0	1	0	1
50	Portugal	0	1	0	1
52	Belgium	0	0	3	3
53	Neutral Athletes A	0	0	2	2
54	Bahamas	0	0	1	1
54	Bosnia and Herzegovina	0	0	1	1
54	Estonia	0	0	1	1
54	Faroe Islands	0	0	1	1
54	Greece	0	0	1	1
54	Puerto Rico	0	0	1	1
54	Serbia	0	0	1	1
Totals (60 entries)		702	691	692	2,085

== Medal winners ==
Updated after the 2024 World Aquatics Swimming Championships (25 m):

- Male events, all editions - List of World Aquatics Swimming Championships (25 m) medalists (men)
- Female events, all editions - List of World Aquatics Swimming Championships (25 m) medalists (women)

== See also ==
- List of World Swimming Championships (25 m) medalists (men)
- List of World Swimming Championships (25 m) medalists (women)
- List of World Championships records in swimming#Short course (25 m)
- Major achievements in swimming by nation
