= Yevgeniya Yermakova =

Kazakhstani swimmer (born 1976)

Personal information
- Born: 9 April 1976 (age 50) Alma-Ata, Kazakh SSR, Soviet Union
Medal record
Women's swimming
Representing the Soviet Union
European Championships (LC)
Gold medal – first place	1991 Athens	4×100 m medley relay

Yevgeniya Yermakova (born 9 April 1976 in Alma-Ata, Kazakh SSR, Soviet Union) is a retired female freestyle swimmer from Kazakhstan. She competed in two consecutive Summer Olympics, starting in 1992 (Barcelona, Spain) for the Unified Team.

Her best Olympic result was finishing in fourth place at the 1992 Summer Olympics in the women's 4×100 m freestyle relay event. She was a gold medalist at the 1991 European Championships (LC) in Athens, Greece. Yermakova was barred after failing a drugs test for a diuretic in Monaco in May 2000.

She lives in New Zealand with her husband.
