= Swimming at the 1994 World Aquatics Championships =

The Swimming portion of the 7th FINA World Aquatics Championships was held from September 5 to 11, 1994. The competition was swum in the outdoor pool at the Foro Italico. The competition consisted of 32 long course events: 16 for men and women each, 26 individual events and 6 relays in total. Events by stroke were:

- freestyle: 50, 100, 200, 400, 800 (women), and 1500 (men);
- backstroke: 100 and 200;
- breaststroke: 100 and 200;
- butterfly: 100 and 200;
- individual medley (I.M.): 200 and 400;
- relays: 4 × 100 free, 4 × 200 free, and 4 × 100 medley.

== Results ==
=== Men ===
Event	Gold		Silver		Bronze	
50 m freestyle	Alexander Popov; Russia	22.17	Gary Hall, Jr. (United States) USA	22.44	Raimundas Mažuolis; Lithuania	22.52
100 m freestyle	Alexander Popov; Russia	49.12	Gary Hall, Jr. (United States) USA	49.41	Gustavo Borges; Brazil	49.52
200 m freestyle	Antti Kasvio; Finland	1:47.32	Anders Holmertz; Sweden	1:48.24	Danyon Loader; New Zealand	1:48.49
400 m freestyle	Kieren Perkins; Australia	3:43.80; WR	Antti Kasvio; Finland	3:48.55	Danyon Loader; New Zealand	3:48.62
1500 m freestyle	Kieren Perkins; Australia	14:50.52	Daniel Kowalski; Australia	14:53.42	Steffen Zesner; Germany	15:09.20
100 m backstroke	Martin López-Zubero; Spain	55.17; CR	Jeff Rouse (United States) USA	55.51	Tamás Deutsch; Hungary	55.69
200 m backstroke	Vladimir Selkov; Russia	1:57.42; CR	Martin López-Zubero; Spain	1:58.75	Royce Sharp (United States) USA	1:58.86
100 m breaststroke	Norbert Rózsa; Hungary	1:01.24; CR	Károly Güttler; Hungary	1:01.44	Frédérik Deburghgraeve; Belgium	1:01.79
200 m breaststroke	Norbert Rózsa; Hungary	2:12.81	Eric Wunderlich (United States) USA	2:12.87	Károly Güttler; Hungary	2:14.12
100 m butterfly	Rafał Szukała; Poland	53.51	Lars Frölander; Sweden	53.65	Denis Pankratov; Russia	53.68
200 m butterfly	Denis Pankratov; Russia	1:56.54	Danyon Loader; New Zealand	1:57.99	Chris-Carol Bremer; Germany	1:58.11
200 m I.M.	Jani Sievinen; Finland	1:58.16; WR	Greg Burgess (United States) USA	2:00.86	Attila Czene; Hungary	2:01.84
400 m I.M.	Tom Dolan (United States) USA	4:12.30; WR	Jani Sievinen; Finland	4:13.29	Eric Namesnik (United States) USA	4:15.69
4 × 100 m freestyle relay	(United States) USA; Jon Olsen; Josh Davis; Ugur Taner; Gary Hall, Jr.	3:16.90; CR	Russia; Roman Shegolev; Vladimir Predkin; Vladimir Pyshnenko; Alexander Popov	3:18.12	Brazil; Fernando Scherer; Teófilo Ferreira; André Teixeira; Gustavo Borges	3:19.35
4 × 200 m freestyle relay	Sweden; Christer Wallin; Tommy Werner; Lars Frölander; Anders Holmertz	7:17.74	Russia; Yury Mukhin; Roman Shegolev; Vladimir Pyshnenko; Denis Pankratov	7:18.13	Germany; Andreas Szigat; Christian Keller; Oliver Lampe; Steffen Zesner	7:19.10
4 × 100 m medley relay	(United States) USA; Jeff Rouse; Eric Wunderlich; Mark Henderson; Gary Hall, Jr.	3:37.74; CR	Russia; Vladimir Selkov; Vasili Ivanov; Denis Pankratov; Alexander Popov	3:38.28	Hungary; Tamás Deutsch; Norbert Rózsa; Péter Horváth; Attila Czene	3:39.47

Legend: WR – World Record; CR – Championship Record

=== Women ===
Event	Gold		Silver		Bronze	
50 freestyle	Le Jingyi; China	24.51; WR	Natalya Meshcheryakova; Russia	25.10	Amy Van Dyken (United States) USA	25.18
100 freestyle	Le Jingyi; China	54.01; WR	Lü Bin; China	54.15	Franziska van Almsick; Germany	54.77
200 freestyle	Franziska van Almsick; Germany	1:56.78; WR	Lü Bin; China	1:56.89	Claudia Poll; Costa Rica	1:57.61
400 freestyle	Yang Aihua; China	4:09.64	Cristina Teuscher (United States) USA	4:10.21	Claudia Poll; Costa Rica	4:10.61
800 m freestyle	Janet Evans (United States) USA	8:29.85	Hayley Lewis; Australia	8:29.94	Brooke Bennett (United States) USA	8:31.30
100 backstroke	He Cihong; China	1:00.57; CR	Nina Zhivanevskaya; Russia	1:00.83	BJ Bedford (United States) USA	1:01.32
200 backstroke	He Cihong; China	2:07.40; CR, NR	Krisztina Egerszegi; Hungary	2:09.10	Lorenza Vigarani; Italy	2:10.92
100 breaststroke	Samantha Riley; Australia	1:07.69; WR	Dai Guohong; China	1:09.26	Yuan Yuan; China	1:10.19
200 breaststroke	Samantha Riley; Australia	2:26.87; CR	Yuan Yuan; China	2:27.38	Brigitte Becue; Belgium	2:28.85
100 butterfly	Liu Limin; China	58.98; CR	Yun Qu; China	59.69	Susie O'Neill; Australia	1:00.11
200 butterfly	Liu Limin; China	2:07.25; CR	Yun Qu; China	2:07.42	Susie O'Neill; Australia	2:09.54
200 I.M.	Lü Bin; China	2:12.34	Allison Wagner (United States) USA	2:14.40	Elli Overton; Australia	2:15.26
400 I.M.	Dai Guohong; China	4:39.14	Allison Wagner (United States) USA	4:39.98	Kristine Quance (United States) USA	4:42.21
4 × 100 freestyle relay	China; Le Ying; Shan Ying; Lü Bin; Le Jingyi	3:37.91; WR	(United States) USA; Angel Martino; Nicole Haislett; Amy Van Dyken; Jenny Thompson	3:41.50	Germany; Franziska van Almsick; Katrin Meissner; Kerstin Kielgass; Daniela Hunger	3:42.94
4 × 200 freestyle relay	China; Le Ying; Yang Aihua; Lü Bin; Zhou Ouanbin	7:57.96; CR	Germany; Franziska van Almsick; Julia Jung; Kerstin Kielgass; Dagmar Hase	8:01.37	(United States) USA; Cristina Teuscher; Nicole Haislett; Janet Evans; Jenny Thompson	8:03.16
4 × 100 medley relay	China; He Cihong; Dai Guohong; Liu Limin; Le Jingyi	4:01.67; WR	(United States) USA; Lea Loveless; Kristine Quance; Amy Van Dyken; Jenny Thompson	4:06.53	Russia; Nina Zhivanevskaya; Olga Prokhorova; Svetlana Pozdeeva; Natalya Meshcheryakova	4:06.70

Legend: WR – World Record; CR – Championship Record

=== Medal table ===
* Host nation (Italy)

Rank	Nation	Gold	Silver	Bronze	Total
1	China (CHN)	12	6	1	19
2	United States (USA)	4	10	7	21
3	Russia (RUS)	4	5	2	11
4	Australia (AUS)	4	2	3	9
5	Hungary (HUN)	2	2	4	8
6	Finland (FIN)	2	2	0	4
7	Sweden (SWE)	1	2	0	3
8	Germany (GER)	1	1	5	7
9	Spain (ESP)	1	1	0	2
10	Poland (POL)	1	0	0	1
11	New Zealand (NZL)	0	1	2	3
12	Belgium (BEL)	0	0	2	2
12	Brazil (BRA)	0	0	2	2
12	Costa Rica (CRC)	0	0	2	2
15	Italy (ITA)*	0	0	1	1
15	Lithuania (LTU)	0	0	1	1
Totals (16 entries)		32	32	32	96
