= List of World Aquatics Championships medalists in swimming (women) =

This is the complete list of women's World Aquatics Championships medalists in swimming from 1973 to 2025.

== Medalists ==
Bold numbers in brackets denotes record number of victories in corresponding disciplines.

=== 50 metre freestyle ===
Year	Gold	Silver	Bronze
1986 Madrid	Tamara Costache; Romania	Kristin Otto; East Germany	Marie-Thérèse Armentero; Switzerland
1991 Perth	Zhuang Yong; China	Leigh Ann Fetter; United States	none awarded
1991 Perth	Zhuang Yong; China	Catherine Plewinski; France	none awarded
1994 Rome	Le Jingyi; China	Natalya Meshcheryakova; Russia	Amy Van Dyken; United States
1998 Perth	Amy Van Dyken; United States	Sandra Völker; Germany	Shan Ying; China
2001 Fukuoka	Inge de Bruijn; Netherlands	Therese Alshammar; Sweden	Sandra Völker; Germany
2003 Barcelona	Inge de Bruijn; Netherlands	Alice Mills; Australia	Libby Lenton; Australia
2005 Montreal	Libby Lenton; Australia	Marleen Veldhuis; Netherlands	Zhu Yingwen; China
2007 Melbourne	Libby Lenton; Australia	Therese Alshammar; Sweden	Marleen Veldhuis; Netherlands
2009 Rome	Britta Steffen; Germany	Therese Alshammar; Sweden	Cate Campbell; Australia
2009 Rome	Britta Steffen; Germany	Therese Alshammar; Sweden	Marleen Veldhuis; Netherlands
2011 Shanghai	Therese Alshammar; Sweden	Ranomi Kromowidjojo; Netherlands	Marleen Veldhuis; Netherlands
2013 Barcelona	Ranomi Kromowidjojo; Netherlands	Cate Campbell; Australia	Francesca Halsall; Great Britain
2015 Kazan	Bronte Campbell; Australia	Ranomi Kromowidjojo; Netherlands	Sarah Sjöström; Sweden
2017 Budapest	Sarah Sjöström; Sweden	Ranomi Kromowidjojo; Netherlands	Simone Manuel; United States
2019 Gwangju	Simone Manuel; United States	Sarah Sjöström; Sweden	Cate Campbell; Australia
2022 Budapest	Sarah Sjöström; Sweden	Katarzyna Wasick; Poland	Erika Brown; United States
2022 Budapest	Sarah Sjöström; Sweden	Katarzyna Wasick; Poland	Meg Harris; Australia
2023 Fukuoka	Sarah Sjöström; Sweden	Shayna Jack; Australia	Zhang Yufei; China
2024 Doha	Sarah Sjöström (4); Sweden	Kate Douglass; United States	Katarzyna Wasick; Poland
2025 Singapore	Meg Harris; Australia	Wu Qingfeng; China	Cheng Yujie; China

Medal table

Rank	Nation	Gold	Silver	Bronze	Total
1	Sweden	5	4	1	10
2	Australia	4	3	4	11
3	Netherlands	3	4	3	10
4	United States	2	2	3	7
5	China	2	1	4	7
6	Germany	1	1	1	3
7	Romania	1	0	0	1
8	Poland	0	1	1	2
9	East Germany	0	1	0	1
9	France	0	1	0	1
9	Russia	0	1	0	1
12	Great Britain	0	0	1	1
12	Switzerland	0	0	1	1
Totals (13 entries)		18	19	19	56

=== 100 metre freestyle ===
Year	Gold	Silver	Bronze
1973 Belgrade	Kornelia Ender; East Germany	Shirley Babashoff; United States	Enith Brigitha; Netherlands
1975 Cali	Kornelia Ender (2); East Germany	Shirley Babashoff; United States	Enith Brigitha; Netherlands
1978 West Berlin	Barbara Krause; East Germany	Lene Jenssen; Norway	Larisa Tsaryova; Soviet Union
1982 Guayaquil	Birgit Meineke; East Germany	Annemarie Verstappen; Netherlands	Jill Sterkel; United States
1986 Madrid	Kristin Otto; East Germany	Jenna Johnson; United States	Conny van Bentum; Netherlands
1991 Perth	Nicole Haislett; United States	Catherine Plewinski; France	Zhuang Yong; China
1994 Rome	Le Jingyi; China	Lü Bin; China	Franziska van Almsick; Germany
1998 Perth	Jenny Thompson; United States	Martina Moravcová; Slovakia	Shan Ying; China
2001 Fukuoka	Inge de Bruijn; Netherlands	Katrin Meissner; Germany	Sandra Völker; Germany
2003 Barcelona	Hanna-Maria Seppälä; Finland	Jodie Henry; Australia	Jenny Thompson; United States
2005 Montreal	Jodie Henry; Australia	Natalie Coughlin; United States	none awarded
2005 Montreal	Jodie Henry; Australia	Malia Metella; France	none awarded
2007 Melbourne	Libby Lenton; Australia	Marleen Veldhuis; Netherlands	Britta Steffen; Germany
2009 Rome	Britta Steffen; Germany	Francesca Halsall; Great Britain	Lisbeth Trickett; Australia
2011 Shanghai	Aliaksandra Herasimenia; Belarus	none awarded	Ranomi Kromowidjojo; Netherlands
2011 Shanghai	Jeanette Ottesen; Denmark	none awarded	Ranomi Kromowidjojo; Netherlands
2013 Barcelona	Cate Campbell; Australia	Sarah Sjöström; Sweden	Ranomi Kromowidjojo; Netherlands
2015 Kazan	Bronte Campbell; Australia	Sarah Sjöström; Sweden	Cate Campbell; Australia
2017 Budapest	Simone Manuel; United States	Sarah Sjöström; Sweden	Pernille Blume; Denmark
2019 Gwangju	Simone Manuel (2); United States	Cate Campbell; Australia	Sarah Sjöström; Sweden
2022 Budapest	Mollie O'Callaghan; Australia	Sarah Sjöström; Sweden	Torri Huske; United States
2023 Fukuoka	Mollie O'Callaghan (2); Australia	Siobhán Haughey; Hong Kong	Marrit Steenbergen; Netherlands
2024 Doha	Marrit Steenbergen; Netherlands	Siobhán Haughey; Hong Kong	Shayna Jack; Australia
2025 Singapore	Marrit Steenbergen (2); Netherlands	Mollie O'Callaghan; Australia	Torri Huske; United States

Medal table

Rank	Nation	Gold	Silver	Bronze	Total
1	Australia	6	3	3	12
2	East Germany	5	0	0	5
3	United States	4	4	4	12
4	Netherlands	3	2	6	11
5	Germany	1	1	3	5
6	China	1	1	2	4
7	Denmark	1	0	1	2
8	Belarus	1	0	0	1
8	Finland	1	0	0	1
10	Sweden	0	4	1	5
11	France	0	2	0	2
11	Hong Kong	0	2	0	2
13	Great Britain	0	1	0	1
13	Norway	0	1	0	1
13	Slovakia	0	1	0	1
16	Soviet Union	0	0	1	1
Totals (16 entries)		23	22	21	66

=== 200 metre freestyle ===
Year	Gold	Silver	Bronze
1973 Belgrade	Keena Rothhammer; United States	Shirley Babashoff; United States	Andrea Eife; East Germany
1975 Cali	Shirley Babashoff; United States	Kornelia Ender; East Germany	Enith Brigitha; Netherlands
1978 West Berlin	Cynthia Woodhead; United States	Barbara Krause; East Germany	Larisa Tsaryova; Soviet Union
1982 Guayaquil	Annemarie Verstappen; Netherlands	Birgit Meineke; East Germany	Annelies Maas; Netherlands
1986 Madrid	Heike Friedrich; East Germany	Manuela Stellmach; East Germany	Mary T. Meagher; United States
1991 Perth	Hayley Lewis; Australia	Janet Evans; United States	Mette Jacobsen; Denmark
1994 Rome	Franziska van Almsick; Germany	Lü Bin; China	Claudia Poll; Costa Rica
1998 Perth	Claudia Poll; Costa Rica	Martina Moravcová; Slovakia	Julia Greville; Australia
2001 Fukuoka	Giaan Rooney; Australia	Yang Yu; China	Camelia Potec; Romania
2003 Barcelona	Alena Popchanka; Belarus	Martina Moravcová; Slovakia	Yang Yu; China
2005 Montreal	Solenne Figuès; France	Federica Pellegrini; Italy	Josefin Lillhage; Sweden
2005 Montreal	Solenne Figuès; France	Federica Pellegrini; Italy	Yang Yu; China
2007 Melbourne	Laure Manaudou; France	Annika Lurz; Germany	Federica Pellegrini; Italy
2009 Rome	Federica Pellegrini; Italy	Allison Schmitt; United States	Dana Vollmer; United States
2011 Shanghai	Federica Pellegrini; Italy	Kylie Palmer; Australia	Camille Muffat; France
2013 Barcelona	Missy Franklin; United States	Federica Pellegrini; Italy	Camille Muffat; France
2015 Kazan	Katie Ledecky; United States	Federica Pellegrini; Italy	Missy Franklin; United States
2017 Budapest	Federica Pellegrini; Italy	Katie Ledecky; United States	none awarded
2017 Budapest	Federica Pellegrini; Italy	Emma McKeon; Australia	none awarded
2019 Gwangju	Federica Pellegrini (4); Italy	Ariarne Titmus; Australia	Sarah Sjöström; Sweden
2022 Budapest	Yang Junxuan; China	Mollie O'Callaghan; Australia	Tang Muhan; China
2023 Fukuoka	Mollie O'Callaghan; Australia	Ariarne Titmus; Australia	Summer McIntosh; Canada
2024 Doha	Siobhán Haughey; Hong Kong	Erika Fairweather; New Zealand	Brianna Throssell; Australia
2025 Singapore	Mollie O'Callaghan; Australia	Li Bingjie; China	Claire Weinstein; United States

Medal table

Rank	Nation	Gold	Silver	Bronze	Total
1	United States	5	4	4	13
2	Australia	4	5	2	11
3	Italy	4	3	1	8
4	France	2	0	2	4
5	East Germany	1	4	1	6
6	China	1	3	3	7
7	Germany	1	1	0	2
8	Netherlands	1	0	2	3
9	Costa Rica	1	0	1	2
10	Belarus	1	0	0	1
10	Hong Kong	1	0	0	1
12	Slovakia	0	2	0	2
13	New Zealand	0	1	0	1
14	Sweden	0	0	2	2
15	Canada	0	0	1	1
15	Denmark	0	0	1	1
15	Romania	0	0	1	1
15	Soviet Union	0	0	1	1
Totals (18 entries)		22	23	22	67

=== 400 metre freestyle ===
Year	Gold	Silver	Bronze
1973 Belgrade	Heather Greenwood; United States	Keena Rothhammer; United States	Novella Calligaris; Italy
1975 Cali	Shirley Babashoff; United States	Jennifer Turrall; Australia	Kathy Heddy; United States
1978 West Berlin	Tracey Wickham; Australia	Cynthia Woodhead; United States	Kim Linehan; United States
1982 Guayaquil	Carmela Schmidt; East Germany	Petra Schneider; East Germany	Tiffany Cohen; United States
1986 Madrid	Heike Friedrich; East Germany	Astrid Strauß; East Germany	Sarah Hardcastle; Great Britain
1991 Perth	Janet Evans; United States	Hayley Lewis; Australia	Suzu Chiba; Japan
1994 Rome	Yang Aihua; China	Cristina Teuscher; United States	Claudia Poll; Costa Rica
1998 Perth	Chen Yan; China	Brooke Bennett; United States	Dagmar Hase; Germany
2001 Fukuoka	Yana Klochkova; Ukraine	Claudia Poll; Costa Rica	Hannah Stockbauer; Germany
2003 Barcelona	Hannah Stockbauer; Germany	Éva Risztov; Hungary	Diana Munz; United States
2005 Montreal	Laure Manaudou; France	Ai Shibata; Japan	Caitlin McClatchey; Great Britain
2007 Melbourne	Laure Manaudou; France	Otylia Jędrzejczak; Poland	Ai Shibata; Japan
2009 Rome	Federica Pellegrini; Italy	Joanne Jackson; Great Britain	Rebecca Adlington; Great Britain
2011 Shanghai	Federica Pellegrini; Italy	Rebecca Adlington; Great Britain	Camille Muffat; France
2013 Barcelona	Katie Ledecky; United States	Melanie Costa; Spain	Lauren Boyle; New Zealand
2015 Kazan	Katie Ledecky; United States	Sharon van Rouwendaal; Netherlands	Jessica Ashwood; Australia
2017 Budapest	Katie Ledecky; United States	Leah Smith; United States	Li Bingjie; China
2019 Gwangju	Ariarne Titmus; Australia	Katie Ledecky; United States	Leah Smith; United States
2022 Budapest	Katie Ledecky (4); United States	Summer McIntosh; Canada	Leah Smith; United States
2023 Fukuoka	Ariarne Titmus; Australia	Katie Ledecky; United States	Erika Fairweather; New Zealand
2024 Doha	Erika Fairweather; New Zealand	Li Bingjie; China	Isabel Gose; Germany
2025 Singapore	Summer McIntosh; Canada	Li Bingjie; China	Katie Ledecky; United States

Medal table

Rank	Nation	Gold	Silver	Bronze	Total
1	United States	7	7	7	21
2	Australia	3	2	1	6
3	China	2	2	1	5
4	East Germany	2	2	0	4
5	France	2	0	1	3
5	Italy	2	0	1	3
7	Canada	1	1	0	2
8	Germany	1	0	3	4
9	New Zealand	1	0	2	3
10	Ukraine	1	0	0	1
11	Great Britain	0	2	3	5
12	Japan	0	1	2	3
13	Costa Rica	0	1	1	2
14	Hungary	0	1	0	1
14	Netherlands	0	1	0	1
14	Poland	0	1	0	1
14	Spain	0	1	0	1
Totals (17 entries)		22	22	22	66

=== 800 metre freestyle ===
Year	Gold	Silver	Bronze
1973 Belgrade	Novella Calligaris; Italy	Joan Harshbarger; United States	Gudrun Wegner; East Germany
1975 Cali	Jennifer Turrall; Australia	Heather Greenwood; United States	Shirley Babashoff; United States
1978 West Berlin	Tracey Wickham; Australia	Cynthia Woodhead; United States	Kim Linehan; United States
1982 Guayaquil	Kim Linehan; United States	Jackie Willmot; Great Britain	Carmela Schmidt; East Germany
1986 Madrid	Astrid Strauß; East Germany	Katja Hartmann; East Germany	Deborah Babashoff; United States
1991 Perth	Janet Evans; United States	Grit Müller; Germany	Jana Henke; Germany
1994 Rome	Janet Evans; United States	Hayley Lewis; Australia	Brooke Bennett; United States
1998 Perth	Brooke Bennett; United States	Diana Munz; United States	Kirsten Vlieghuis; Netherlands
2001 Fukuoka	Hannah Stockbauer; Germany	Diana Munz; United States	Kaitlin Sandeno; United States
2003 Barcelona	Hannah Stockbauer; Germany	Diana Munz; United States	Rebecca Cooke; Great Britain
2005 Montreal	Kate Ziegler; United States	Brittany Reimer; Canada	Ai Shibata; Japan
2007 Melbourne	Kate Ziegler; United States	Laure Manaudou; France	Hayley Peirsol; United States
2009 Rome	Lotte Friis; Denmark	Joanne Jackson; Great Britain	Alessia Filippi; Italy
2011 Shanghai	Rebecca Adlington; Great Britain	Lotte Friis; Denmark	Kate Ziegler; United States
2013 Barcelona	Katie Ledecky; United States	Lotte Friis; Denmark	Lauren Boyle; New Zealand
2015 Kazan	Katie Ledecky; United States	Lauren Boyle; New Zealand	Jazmin Carlin; Great Britain
2017 Budapest	Katie Ledecky; United States	Li Bingjie; China	Leah Smith; United States
2019 Gwangju	Katie Ledecky; United States	Simona Quadarella; Italy	Ariarne Titmus; Australia
2022 Budapest	Katie Ledecky; United States	Kiah Melverton; Australia	Simona Quadarella; Italy
2023 Fukuoka	Katie Ledecky; United States	Li Bingjie; China	Ariarne Titmus; Australia
2024 Doha	Simona Quadarella; Italy	Isabel Gose; Germany	Erika Fairweather; New Zealand
2025 Singapore	Katie Ledecky (7); United States	Lani Pallister; Australia	Summer McIntosh; Canada

Medal table

Rank	Nation	Gold	Silver	Bronze	Total
1	United States	13	6	8	27
2	Australia	2	3	2	7
3	Germany	2	2	1	5
4	Italy	2	1	2	5
5	Great Britain	1	2	2	5
6	Denmark	1	2	0	3
7	East Germany	1	1	2	4
8	China	0	2	0	2
9	New Zealand	0	1	2	3
10	Canada	0	1	1	2
11	France	0	1	0	1
12	Japan	0	0	1	1
12	Netherlands	0	0	1	1
Totals (13 entries)		22	22	22	66

=== 1500 metre freestyle ===
Year	Gold	Silver	Bronze
2001 Fukuoka	Hannah Stockbauer; Germany	Flavia Rigamonti; Switzerland	Diana Munz; United States
2003 Barcelona	Hannah Stockbauer; Germany	Hayley Peirsol; United States	Jana Henke; Germany
2005 Montreal	Kate Ziegler; United States	Flavia Rigamonti; Switzerland	Brittany Reimer; Canada
2007 Melbourne	Kate Ziegler; United States	Flavia Rigamonti; Switzerland	Ai Shibata; Japan
2009 Rome	Alessia Filippi; Italy	Lotte Friis; Denmark	Camelia Potec; Romania
2011 Shanghai	Lotte Friis; Denmark	Kate Ziegler; United States	Li Xuanxu; China
2013 Barcelona	Katie Ledecky; United States	Lotte Friis; Denmark	Lauren Boyle; New Zealand
2015 Kazan	Katie Ledecky; United States	Lauren Boyle; New Zealand	Boglárka Kapás; Hungary
2017 Budapest	Katie Ledecky; United States	Mireia Belmonte; Spain	Simona Quadarella; Italy
2019 Gwangju	Simona Quadarella; Italy	Sarah Köhler; Germany	Wang Jianjiahe; China
2022 Budapest	Katie Ledecky; United States	Katie Grimes; United States	Lani Pallister; Australia
2023 Fukuoka	Katie Ledecky; United States	Simona Quadarella; Italy	Li Bingjie; China
2024 Doha	Simona Quadarella; Italy	Li Bingjie; China	Isabel Gose; Germany
2025 Singapore	Katie Ledecky (6); United States	Simona Quadarella; Italy	Lani Pallister; Australia

Medal table

Rank	Nation	Gold	Silver	Bronze	Total
1	United States	8	3	1	12
2	Italy	3	2	1	6
3	Germany	2	1	2	5
4	Denmark	1	2	0	3
5	Switzerland	0	3	0	3
6	China	0	1	3	4
7	New Zealand	0	1	1	2
8	Spain	0	1	0	1
9	Australia	0	0	2	2
10	Canada	0	0	1	1
10	Hungary	0	0	1	1
10	Japan	0	0	1	1
10	Romania	0	0	1	1
Totals (13 entries)		14	14	14	42

=== 50 metre backstroke ===
Year	Gold	Silver	Bronze
2001 Fukuoka	Haley Cope; United States	Antje Buschschulte; Germany	Natalie Coughlin; United States
2003 Barcelona	Nina Zhivanevskaya; Spain	Ilona Hlaváčková; Czech Republic	Noriko Inada; Japan
2005 Montreal	Giaan Rooney; Australia	Gao Chang; China	Antje Buschschulte; Germany
2007 Melbourne	Leila Vaziri; United States	Aliaksandra Herasimenia; Belarus	Tayliah Zimmer; Australia
2009 Rome	Zhao Jing; China	Daniela Samulski; Germany	Gao Chang; China
2011 Shanghai	Anastasia Zuyeva; Russia	Aya Terakawa; Japan	Missy Franklin; United States
2013 Barcelona	Zhao Jing (2); China	Fu Yuanhui; China	Aya Terakawa; Japan
2015 Kazan	Fu Yuanhui; China	Etiene Medeiros; Brazil	Liu Xiang; China
2017 Budapest	Etiene Medeiros; Brazil	Fu Yuanhui; China	Aliaksandra Herasimenia; Belarus
2019 Gwangju	Olivia Smoliga; United States	Etiene Medeiros; Brazil	Daria Vaskina; Russia
2022 Budapest	Kylie Masse; Canada	Katharine Berkoff; United States	Analia Pigrée; France
2023 Fukuoka	Kaylee McKeown; Australia	Regan Smith; United States	Lauren Cox; Great Britain
2024 Doha	Claire Curzan; United States	Iona Anderson; Australia	Ingrid Wilm; Canada
2025 Singapore	Katharine Berkoff; United States	Regan Smith; United States	Wan Letian; China

Medal table

Rank	Nation	Gold	Silver	Bronze	Total
1	United States	5	3	2	10
2	China	3	3	3	9
3	Australia	2	1	1	4
4	Brazil	1	2	0	3
5	Canada	1	0	1	2
5	Russia	1	0	1	2
7	Spain	1	0	0	1
8	Germany	0	2	1	3
9	Japan	0	1	2	3
10	Belarus	0	1	1	2
11	Czech Republic	0	1	0	1
12	France	0	0	1	1
12	Great Britain	0	0	1	1
Totals (13 entries)		14	14	14	42

=== 100 metre backstroke ===
Year	Gold	Silver	Bronze
1973 Belgrade	Ulrike Richter; East Germany	Melissa Belote; United States	Wendy Hogg; Canada
1975 Cali	Ulrike Richter (2); East Germany	Birgit Treiber; East Germany	Nancy Garapick; Canada
1978 West Berlin	Linda Jezek; United States	Birgit Treiber; East Germany	Cheryl Gibson; Canada
1982 Guayaquil	Kristin Otto; East Germany	Ina Kleber; East Germany	Susan Walsh; United States
1986 Madrid	Betsy Mitchell; United States	Kathrin Zimmermann; East Germany	Natalya Shibayeva; Soviet Union
1991 Perth	Krisztina Egerszegi; Hungary	Tünde Szabó; Hungary	Janie Wagstaff; United States
1994 Rome	He Cihong; China	Nina Zhivanevskaya; Russia	Barbara Bedford; United States
1998 Perth	Lea Maurer; United States	Mai Nakamura; Japan	Sandra Völker; Germany
2001 Fukuoka	Natalie Coughlin; United States	Diana Mocanu; Romania	Antje Buschschulte; Germany
2003 Barcelona	Antje Buschschulte; Germany	Louise Ørnstedt; Denmark	none awarded
2003 Barcelona	Antje Buschschulte; Germany	Katy Sexton; Great Britain	none awarded
2005 Montreal	Kirsty Coventry; Zimbabwe	Antje Buschschulte; Germany	Natalie Coughlin; United States
2007 Melbourne	Natalie Coughlin (2); United States	Laure Manaudou; France	Reiko Nakamura; Japan
2009 Rome	Gemma Spofforth; Great Britain	Anastasia Zuyeva; Russia	Emily Seebohm; Australia
2011 Shanghai	Zhao Jing; China	Anastasia Zuyeva; Russia	Natalie Coughlin; United States
2013 Barcelona	Missy Franklin; United States	Emily Seebohm; Australia	Aya Terakawa; Japan
2015 Kazan	Emily Seebohm; Australia	Madison Wilson; Australia	Mie Nielsen; Denmark
2017 Budapest	Kylie Masse; Canada	Kathleen Baker; United States	Emily Seebohm; Australia
2019 Gwangju	Kylie Masse (2); Canada	Minna Atherton; Australia	Olivia Smoliga; United States
2022 Budapest	Regan Smith; United States	Kylie Masse; Canada	Claire Curzan; United States
2023 Fukuoka	Kaylee McKeown; Australia	Regan Smith; United States	Katharine Berkoff; United States
2024 Doha	Claire Curzan; United States	Iona Anderson; Australia	Ingrid Wilm; Canada
2025 Singapore	Kaylee McKeown (2); Australia	Regan Smith; United States	Katharine Berkoff; United States

Medal table

Rank	Nation	Gold	Silver	Bronze	Total
1	United States	8	4	9	21
2	Australia	3	4	2	9
3	East Germany	3	4	0	7
4	Canada	2	1	4	7
5	China	2	0	0	2
6	Germany	1	1	2	4
7	Great Britain	1	1	0	2
7	Hungary	1	1	0	2
9	Zimbabwe	1	0	0	1
10	Russia	0	3	0	3
11	Japan	0	1	2	3
12	Denmark	0	1	1	2
13	France	0	1	0	1
13	Romania	0	1	0	1
15	Soviet Union	0	0	1	1
Totals (15 entries)		22	23	21	66

=== 200 metre backstroke ===
Year	Gold	Silver	Bronze
1973 Belgrade	Melissa Belote; United States	Enith Brigitha; Netherlands	Andrea Gyarmati; Hungary
1975 Cali	Birgit Treiber; East Germany	Nancy Garapick; Canada	Ulrike Richter; East Germany
1978 West Berlin	Linda Jezek; United States	Birgit Treiber; East Germany	Cheryl Gibson; Canada
1982 Guayaquil	Kornelia Sirch; East Germany	Georgina Parkes; Australia	Carmen Bunaciu; Romania
1986 Madrid	Kornelia Sirch; East Germany	Betsy Mitchell; United States	Kathrin Zimmermann; East Germany
1991 Perth	Krisztina Egerszegi; Hungary	Dagmar Hase; Germany	Janie Wagstaff; United States
1994 Rome	He Cihong; China	Krisztina Egerszegi; Hungary	Lorenza Vigarani; Italy
1998 Perth	Roxana Maracineanu; France	Dagmar Hase; Germany	Mai Nakamura; Japan
2001 Fukuoka	Diana Mocanu; Romania	Stanislava Komarova; Russia	Joanna Fargus; Great Britain
2003 Barcelona	Katy Sexton; Great Britain	Margaret Hoelzer; United States	Stanislava Komarova; Russia
2005 Montreal	Kirsty Coventry; Zimbabwe	Margaret Hoelzer; United States	Reiko Nakamura; Japan
2007 Melbourne	Margaret Hoelzer; United States	Kirsty Coventry; Zimbabwe	Reiko Nakamura; Japan
2009 Rome	Kirsty Coventry; Zimbabwe	Anastasia Zuyeva; Russia	Elizabeth Beisel; United States
2011 Shanghai	Missy Franklin; United States	Belinda Hocking; Australia	Sharon van Rouwendaal; Netherlands
2013 Barcelona	Missy Franklin; United States	Belinda Hocking; Australia	Hilary Caldwell; Canada
2015 Kazan	Emily Seebohm; Australia	Missy Franklin; United States	Katinka Hosszú; Hungary
2017 Budapest	Emily Seebohm; Australia	Katinka Hosszú; Hungary	Kathleen Baker; United States
2019 Gwangju	Regan Smith; United States	Kaylee McKeown; Australia	Kylie Masse; Canada
2022 Budapest	Kaylee McKeown; Australia	Phoebe Bacon; United States	Rhyan White; United States
2023 Fukuoka	Kaylee McKeown; Australia	Regan Smith; United States	Peng Xuwei; China
2024 Doha	Claire Curzan; United States	Jaclyn Barclay; Australia	Anastasiya Shkurdai; Neutral Independent Athletes
2025 Singapore	Kaylee McKeown (3); Australia	Regan Smith; United States	Claire Curzan; United States

Medal table

Rank	Nation	Gold	Silver	Bronze	Total
1	United States	7	7	5	19
2	Australia	5	5	0	10
3	East Germany	3	1	2	6
4	Zimbabwe	2	1	0	3
5	Hungary	1	2	2	5
6	China	1	0	1	2
6	Great Britain	1	0	1	2
6	Romania	1	0	1	2
9	France	1	0	0	1
10	Russia	0	2	1	3
11	Germany	0	2	0	2
12	Canada	0	1	3	4
13	Netherlands	0	1	1	2
14	Japan	0	0	3	3
15	Italy	0	0	1	1
15	Neutral Independent Athletes (Note: At the 2024 World Championships, in accordance with sanctions imposed following by the 2022 Russian invasion of Ukraine, athletes from Belarus were not permitted to use the name, flag, or anthem of Belarus. They instead participated as "Neutral Independent Athletes (NIA)" and under the World Aquatics flag.)	0	0	1	1
Totals (16 entries)		22	22	22	66

=== 50 metre breaststroke ===
Year	Gold	Silver	Bronze
2001 Fukuoka	Luo Xuejuan; China	Kristy Kowal; United States	Zoë Baker; Great Britain
2003 Barcelona	Luo Xuejuan; China	Brooke Hanson; Australia	Zoë Baker; Great Britain
2005 Montreal	Jade Edmistone; Australia	Jessica Hardy; United States	Brooke Hanson; Australia
2007 Melbourne	Jessica Hardy; United States	Leisel Jones; Australia	Tara Kirk; United States
2009 Rome	Yuliya Yefimova; Russia	Rebecca Soni; United States	Sarah Katsoulis; Australia
2011 Shanghai	Jessica Hardy; United States	Yuliya Yefimova; Russia	Rebecca Soni; United States
2013 Barcelona	Yuliya Yefimova; Russia	Rūta Meilutytė; Lithuania	Jessica Hardy; United States
2015 Kazan	Jennie Johansson; Sweden	Alia Atkinson; Jamaica	Yuliya Yefimova; Russia
2017 Budapest	Lilly King; United States	Yuliya Yefimova; Russia	Katie Meili; United States
2019 Gwangju	Lilly King; United States	Benedetta Pilato; Italy	Yuliya Yefimova; Russia
2022 Budapest	Rūta Meilutytė; Lithuania	Benedetta Pilato; Italy	Lara van Niekerk; South Africa
2023 Fukuoka	Rūta Meilutytė; Lithuania	Lilly King; United States	Benedetta Pilato; Italy
2024 Doha	Rūta Meilutytė; Lithuania	Tang Qianting; China	Benedetta Pilato; Italy
2025 Singapore	Rūta Meilutytė (4); Lithuania	Tang Qianting; China	Benedetta Pilato; Italy

Medal table

Rank	Nation	Gold	Silver	Bronze	Total
1	United States	4	4	4	12
2	Lithuania	4	1	0	5
3	Russia	2	2	2	6
4	China	2	2	0	4
5	Australia	1	2	2	5
6	Sweden	1	0	0	1
7	Italy	0	2	3	5
8	Jamaica	0	1	0	1
9	Great Britain	0	0	2	2
10	South Africa	0	0	1	1
Totals (10 entries)		14	14	14	42

=== 100 metre breaststroke ===
Year	Gold	Silver	Bronze
1973 Belgrade	Renate Vogel; East Germany	Lyubov Rusanova; Soviet Union	Brigitte Schuchardt; East Germany
1975 Cali	Hannelore Anke; East Germany	Wijda Mazereeuw; Netherlands	Marcia Morey; United States
1978 West Berlin	Yuliya Bogdanova; Soviet Union	Tracy Caulkins; United States	Margaret Kelly; Great Britain
1982 Guayaquil	Ute Geweniger; East Germany	Ann Ottenbrite; Canada	none awarded
1982 Guayaquil	Ute Geweniger; East Germany	Kim Rhodenbaugh; United States	none awarded
1986 Madrid	Sylvia Gerasch; East Germany	Silke Hörner; East Germany	Tanya Bogomilova; Bulgaria
1991 Perth	Linley Frame; Australia	Jana Dörries; Germany	Yelena Volkova; Soviet Union
1994 Rome	Samantha Riley; Australia	Dai Guohong; China	Yuan Yuan; China
1998 Perth	Kristy Kowal; United States	Helen Denman; Australia	Lauren van Oosten; Canada
2001 Fukuoka	Luo Xuejuan; China	Leisel Jones; Australia	Ágnes Kovács; Hungary
2003 Barcelona	Luo Xuejuan (2); China	Amanda Beard; United States	Leisel Jones; Australia
2005 Montreal	Leisel Jones; Australia	Jessica Hardy; United States	Tara Kirk; United States
2007 Melbourne	Leisel Jones (2); Australia	Tara Kirk; United States	Anna Khlistunova; Ukraine
2009 Rome	Rebecca Soni; United States	Yuliya Yefimova; Russia	Kasey Carlson; United States
2011 Shanghai	Rebecca Soni (2); United States	Leisel Jones; Australia	Ji Liping; China
2013 Barcelona	Rūta Meilutytė; Lithuania	Yuliya Yefimova; Russia	Jessica Hardy; United States
2015 Kazan	Yuliya Yefimova; Russia	Rūta Meilutytė; Lithuania	Alia Atkinson; Jamaica
2017 Budapest	Lilly King; United States	Katie Meili; United States	Yuliya Yefimova; Russia
2019 Gwangju	Lilly King (2); United States	Yuliya Yefimova; Russia	Martina Carraro; Italy
2022 Budapest	Benedetta Pilato; Italy	Anna Elendt; Germany	Rūta Meilutytė; Lithuania
2023 Fukuoka	Rūta Meilutytė (2); Lithuania	Tatjana Schoenmaker; South Africa	Lydia Jacoby; United States
2024 Doha	Tang Qianting; China	Tes Schouten; Netherlands	Siobhán Haughey; Hong Kong
2025 Singapore	Anna Elendt; Germany	Kate Douglass; United States	Tang Qianting; China

Medal table

Rank	Nation	Gold	Silver	Bronze	Total
1	United States	5	7	5	17
2	Australia	4	3	1	8
3	East Germany	4	1	1	6
4	China	3	1	3	7
5	Lithuania	2	1	1	4
6	Russia	1	3	1	5
7	Germany	1	2	0	3
8	Soviet Union	1	1	1	3
9	Italy	1	0	1	2
10	Netherlands	0	2	0	2
11	Canada	0	1	1	2
12	South Africa	0	1	0	1
13	Bulgaria	0	0	1	1
13	Great Britain	0	0	1	1
13	Hong Kong	0	0	1	1
13	Hungary	0	0	1	1
13	Jamaica	0	0	1	1
13	Ukraine	0	0	1	1
Totals (18 entries)		22	23	21	66

=== 200 metre breaststroke ===
Year	Gold	Silver	Bronze
1973 Belgrade	Renate Vogel; East Germany	Hannelore Anke; East Germany	Lynn Colella; United States
1975 Cali	Hannelore Anke; East Germany	Wijda Mazereeuw; Netherlands	Karla Linke; East Germany
1978 West Berlin	Lina Kačiušytė; Soviet Union	Yuliya Bogdanova; Soviet Union	Susanne Nielsson; Denmark
1982 Guayaquil	Svetlana Varganova; Soviet Union	Ute Geweniger; East Germany	Ann Ottenbrite; Canada
1986 Madrid	Silke Hörner; East Germany	Tanya Bogomilova; Bulgaria	Allison Higson; Canada
1991 Perth	Yelena Volkova; Soviet Union	Linley Frame; Australia	Jana Dörries; Germany
1994 Rome	Samantha Riley; Australia	Yuan Yuan; China	Brigitte Becue; Belgium
1998 Perth	Ágnes Kovács; Hungary	Kristy Kowal; United States	Jenna Street; United States
2001 Fukuoka	Ágnes Kovács; Hungary	Qi Hui; China	Luo Xuejuan; China
2003 Barcelona	Amanda Beard; United States	Leisel Jones; Australia	Qi Hui; China
2005 Montreal	Leisel Jones; Australia	Anne Poleska; Germany	Mirna Jukić; Austria
2007 Melbourne	Leisel Jones; Australia	Kirsty Balfour; Great Britain	none awarded
2007 Melbourne	Leisel Jones; Australia	Megan Jendrick; United States	none awarded
2009 Rome	Nađa Higl; Serbia	Annamay Pierse; Canada	Mirna Jukić; Austria
2011 Shanghai	Rebecca Soni; United States	Yuliya Yefimova; Russia	Martha McCabe; Canada
2013 Barcelona	Yuliya Yefimova; Russia	Rikke Møller Pedersen; Denmark	Micah Lawrence; United States
2015 Kazan	Kanako Watanabe; Japan	Micah Lawrence; United States	Rikke Møller Pedersen; Denmark
2015 Kazan	Kanako Watanabe; Japan	Micah Lawrence; United States	Shi Jinglin; China
2015 Kazan	Kanako Watanabe; Japan	Micah Lawrence; United States	Jessica Vall; Spain
2017 Budapest	Yuliya Yefimova; Russia	Bethany Galat; United States	Shi Jinglin; China
2019 Gwangju	Yuliya Yefimova (3); Russia	Tatjana Schoenmaker; South Africa	Sydney Pickrem; Canada
2022 Budapest	Lilly King; United States	Jenna Strauch; Australia	Kate Douglass; United States
2023 Fukuoka	Tatjana Schoenmaker; South Africa	Kate Douglass; United States	Tes Schouten; Netherlands
2024 Doha	Tes Schouten; Netherlands	Kate Douglass; United States	Sydney Pickrem; Canada
2025 Singapore	Kate Douglass; United States	Evgeniia Chikunova; Neutral Athletes B	Kaylene Corbett; South Africa
2025 Singapore	Kate Douglass; United States	Evgeniia Chikunova; Neutral Athletes B	Alina Zmushka; Neutral Athletes A

Medal table

Rank	Nation	Gold	Silver	Bronze	Total
1	United States	4	6	4	14
2	Australia	3	3	0	6
3	East Germany	3	2	1	6
4	Soviet Union	3	1	1	5
5	Russia	3	1	0	4
6	Hungary	2	0	0	2
7	Netherlands	1	1	1	3
7	South Africa	1	1	1	3
9	Japan	1	0	0	1
9	Serbia	1	0	0	1
11	China	0	2	4	6
12	Canada	0	1	5	6
13	Denmark	0	1	1	2
13	Germany	0	1	1	2
15	Bulgaria	0	1	0	1
15	Great Britain	0	1	0	1
15	Neutral Athletes B (Note: At the 2025 World Championships, in accordance with sanctions imposed following by the 2022 Russian invasion of Ukraine, athletes from Russia were not permitted to use the name, flag, or anthem of Russia. They instead participated as "Neutral Athletes B (NAB)" and under the World Aquatics flag.)	0	1	0	1
18	Austria	0	0	2	2
19	Belgium	0	0	1	1
19	Neutral Athletes A (Note: At the 2025 World Championships, in accordance with sanctions imposed following by the 2022 Russian invasion of Ukraine, athletes from Belarus were not permitted to use the name, flag, or anthem of Belarus. They instead participated as "Neutral Athletes A (NAA)" and under the World Aquatics flag.)	0	0	1	1
19	Spain	0	0	1	1
Totals (21 entries)		22	23	24	69

=== 50 metre butterfly ===
Year	Gold	Silver	Bronze
2001 Fukuoka	Inge de Bruijn; Netherlands	Therese Alshammar; Sweden	Anna-Karin Kammerling; Sweden
2003 Barcelona	Inge de Bruijn; Netherlands	Jenny Thompson; United States	Anna-Karin Kammerling; Sweden
2005 Montreal	Danni Miatke; Australia	Anna-Karin Kammerling; Sweden	Therese Alshammar; Sweden
2007 Melbourne	Therese Alshammar; Sweden	Danni Miatke; Australia	Inge Dekker; Netherlands
2009 Rome	Marieke Guehrer; Australia	Zhou Yafei; China	Ingvild Snildal; Norway
2011 Shanghai	Inge Dekker; Netherlands	Therese Alshammar; Sweden	Mélanie Henique; France
2013 Barcelona	Jeanette Ottesen; Denmark	Lu Ying; China	Ranomi Kromowidjojo; Netherlands
2015 Kazan	Sarah Sjöström; Sweden	Jeanette Ottesen; Denmark	Lu Ying; China
2017 Budapest	Sarah Sjöström; Sweden	Ranomi Kromowidjojo; Netherlands	Farida Osman; Egypt
2019 Gwangju	Sarah Sjöström; Sweden	Ranomi Kromowidjojo; Netherlands	Farida Osman; Egypt
2022 Budapest	Sarah Sjöström; Sweden	Mélanie Henique; France	Zhang Yufei; China
2023 Fukuoka	Sarah Sjöström; Sweden	Zhang Yufei; China	Gretchen Walsh; United States
2024 Doha	Sarah Sjöström (6); Sweden	Mélanie Henique; France	Farida Osman; Egypt
2025 Singapore	Gretchen Walsh; United States	Alexandria Perkins; Australia	Roos Vanotterdijk; Belgium

Medal table

Rank	Nation	Gold	Silver	Bronze	Total
1	Sweden	7	3	3	13
2	Netherlands	3	2	2	7
3	Australia	2	2	0	4
4	United States	1	1	1	3
5	Denmark	1	1	0	2
6	China	0	3	2	5
7	France	0	2	1	3
8	Egypt	0	0	3	3
9	Belgium	0	0	1	1
9	Norway	0	0	1	1
Totals (10 entries)		14	14	14	42

=== 100 metre butterfly ===
Year	Gold	Silver	Bronze
1973 Belgrade	Kornelia Ender; East Germany	Rosemarie Kother; East Germany	Mayumi Aoki; Japan
1975 Cali	Kornelia Ender; East Germany	Rosemarie Kother; East Germany	Camille Wright; United States
1978 West Berlin	Joan Pennington; United States	Andrea Pollack; East Germany	Wendy Quirk; Canada
1982 Guayaquil	Mary T. Meagher; United States	Ines Geissler; East Germany	Melanie Buddemeyer; United States
1986 Madrid	Kornelia Gressler; East Germany	Kristin Otto; East Germany	Mary T. Meagher; United States
1991 Perth	Qian Hong; China	Wang Xiaohong; China	Catherine Plewinski; France
1994 Rome	Liu Limin; China	Qu Yun; China	Susan O'Neill; Australia
1998 Perth	Jenny Thompson; United States	Ayari Aoyama; Japan	Petria Thomas; Australia
2001 Fukuoka	Petria Thomas; Australia	Otylia Jędrzejczak; Poland	Junko Onishi; Japan
2003 Barcelona	Jenny Thompson; United States	Otylia Jędrzejczak; Poland	Martina Moravcová; Slovakia
2005 Montreal	Jessicah Schipper; Australia	Libby Lenton; Australia	Otylia Jędrzejczak; Poland
2007 Melbourne	Libby Lenton; Australia	Jessicah Schipper; Australia	Natalie Coughlin; United States
2009 Rome	Sarah Sjöström; Sweden	Jessicah Schipper; Australia	Jiao Liuyang; China
2011 Shanghai	Dana Vollmer; United States	Alicia Coutts; Australia	Lu Ying; China
2013 Barcelona	Sarah Sjöström; Sweden	Alicia Coutts; Australia	Dana Vollmer; United States
2015 Kazan	Sarah Sjöström; Sweden	Jeanette Ottesen; Denmark	Lu Ying; China
2017 Budapest	Sarah Sjöström (4); Sweden	Emma McKeon; Australia	Kelsi Worrell; United States
2019 Gwangju	Maggie Mac Neil; Canada	Sarah Sjöström; Sweden	Emma McKeon; Australia
2022 Budapest	Torri Huske; United States	Marie Wattel; France	Zhang Yufei; China
2023 Fukuoka	Zhang Yufei; China	Maggie Mac Neil; Canada	Torri Huske; United States
2024 Doha	Angelina Köhler; Germany	Claire Curzan; United States	Louise Hansson; Sweden
2025 Singapore	Gretchen Walsh; United States	Roos Vanotterdijk; Belgium	Alexandria Perkins; Australia

Medal table

Rank	Nation	Gold	Silver	Bronze	Total
1	United States	7	1	7	15
2	Sweden	4	1	1	6
3	Australia	3	6	4	13
4	East Germany	3	5	0	8
5	China	3	2	4	9
6	Canada	1	1	1	3
7	Germany	1	0	0	1
8	Poland	0	2	1	3
9	Japan	0	1	2	3
10	France	0	1	1	2
11	Belgium	0	1	0	1
11	Denmark	0	1	0	1
13	Slovakia	0	0	1	1
Totals (13 entries)		22	22	22	66

=== 200 metre butterfly ===
Year	Gold	Silver	Bronze
1973 Belgrade	Rosemarie Kother; East Germany	Roswitha Beier; East Germany	Lynn Colella; United States
1975 Cali	Rosemarie Kother; East Germany	Valerie Lee; United States	Gabrielle Wuschek; East Germany
1978 West Berlin	Tracy Caulkins; United States	Nancy Hogshead; United States	Andrea Pollack; East Germany
1982 Guayaquil	Ines Geissler; East Germany	Mary T. Meagher; United States	Heike Dahne; East Germany
1986 Madrid	Mary T. Meagher; United States	Kornelia Gressler; East Germany	Birte Weigang; East Germany
1991 Perth	Summer Sanders; United States	Rie Shito; Japan	Hayley Lewis; Australia
1994 Rome	Liu Limin; China	Qu Yun; China	Susan O'Neill; Australia
1998 Perth	Susan O'Neill; Australia	Petria Thomas; Australia	Misty Hyman; United States
2001 Fukuoka	Petria Thomas; Australia	Annika Mehlhorn; Germany	Kaitlin Sandeno; United States
2003 Barcelona	Otylia Jędrzejczak; Poland	Éva Risztov; Hungary	Yuko Nakanishi; Japan
2005 Montreal	Otylia Jędrzejczak; Poland	Jessicah Schipper; Australia	Yuko Nakanishi; Japan
2007 Melbourne	Jessicah Schipper; Australia	Kim Vandenberg; United States	Otylia Jędrzejczak; Poland
2009 Rome	Jessicah Schipper; Australia	Liu Zige; China	Katinka Hosszú; Hungary
2011 Shanghai	Jiao Liuyang; China	Ellen Gandy; Great Britain	Liu Zige; China
2013 Barcelona	Liu Zige; China	Mireia Belmonte; Spain	Katinka Hosszú; Hungary
2015 Kazan	Natsumi Hoshi; Japan	Cammile Adams; United States	Zhang Yufei; China
2017 Budapest	Mireia Belmonte; Spain	Franziska Hentke; Germany	Katinka Hosszú; Hungary
2019 Gwangju	Boglárka Kapás; Hungary	Hali Flickinger; United States	Katie Drabot; United States
2022 Budapest	Summer McIntosh; Canada	Hali Flickinger; United States	Zhang Yufei; China
2023 Fukuoka	Summer McIntosh; Canada	Elizabeth Dekkers; Australia	Regan Smith; United States
2024 Doha	Laura Stephens; Great Britain	Helena Rosendahl Bach; Denmark	Lana Pudar; Bosnia and Herzegovina
2025 Singapore	Summer McIntosh (3); Canada	Regan Smith; United States	Elizabeth Dekkers; Australia

Medal table

Rank	Nation	Gold	Silver	Bronze	Total
1	Australia	4	3	3	10
2	United States	3	8	5	16
3	East Germany	3	2	4	9
4	China	3	2	3	8
5	Canada	3	0	0	3
6	Poland	2	0	1	3
7	Hungary	1	1	3	5
8	Japan	1	1	2	4
9	Great Britain	1	1	0	2
9	Spain	1	1	0	2
11	Germany	0	2	0	2
12	Denmark	0	1	0	1
13	Bosnia and Herzegovina	0	0	1	1
Totals (13 entries)		22	22	22	66

=== 200 metre individual medley ===
Year	Gold	Silver	Bronze
1973 Belgrade	Andrea Hubner; East Germany	Kornelia Ender; East Germany	Kathy Heddy; United States
1975 Cali	Kathy Heddy; United States	Ulrike Tauber; East Germany	Angela Franke; East Germany
1978 West Berlin	Tracy Caulkins; United States	Joan Pennington; United States	Ulrike Tauber; East Germany
1982 Guayaquil	Petra Schneider; East Germany	Ute Geweniger; East Germany	Tracy Caulkins; United States
1986 Madrid	Kristin Otto; East Germany	Elena Dendeberova; Soviet Union	Kathleen Nord; East Germany
1991 Perth	Lin Li; China	Summer Sanders; United States	Daniela Hunger; Germany
1994 Rome	Lü Bin; China	Allison Wagner; United States	Elli Overton; Australia
1998 Perth	Wu Yanyan; China	Chen Yan; China	Martina Moravcová; Slovakia
2001 Fukuoka	Martha Bowen; United States	Yana Klochkova; Ukraine	Qi Hui; China
2003 Barcelona	Yana Klochkova; Ukraine	Alice Mills; Australia	Zhou Yafei; China
2005 Montreal	Katie Hoff; United States	Kirsty Coventry; Zimbabwe	Lara Carroll; Australia
2007 Melbourne	Katie Hoff; United States	Kirsty Coventry; Zimbabwe	Stephanie Rice; Australia
2009 Rome	Ariana Kukors; United States	Stephanie Rice; Australia	Katinka Hosszú; Hungary
2011 Shanghai	Ye Shiwen; China	Alicia Coutts; Australia	Ariana Kukors; United States
2013 Barcelona	Katinka Hosszú; Hungary	Alicia Coutts; Australia	Mireia Belmonte; Spain
2015 Kazan	Katinka Hosszú; Hungary	Kanako Watanabe; Japan	Siobhan-Marie O'Connor; Great Britain
2017 Budapest	Katinka Hosszú; Hungary	Yui Ohashi; Japan	Madisyn Cox; United States
2019 Gwangju	Katinka Hosszú (4); Hungary	Ye Shiwen; China	Sydney Pickrem; Canada
2022 Budapest	Alex Walsh; United States	Kaylee McKeown; Australia	Leah Hayes; United States
2023 Fukuoka	Kate Douglass; United States	Alex Walsh; United States	Yu Yiting; China
2024 Doha	Kate Douglass; United States	Sydney Pickrem; Canada	Yu Yiting; China
2025 Singapore	Summer McIntosh; Canada	Alex Walsh; United States	Mary-Sophie Harvey; Canada

Medal table

Rank	Nation	Gold	Silver	Bronze	Total
1	United States	9	5	5	19
2	China	4	2	4	10
3	Hungary	4	0	1	5
4	East Germany	3	3	3	9
5	Canada	1	1	2	4
6	Ukraine	1	1	0	2
7	Australia	0	5	3	8
8	Japan	0	2	0	2
8	Zimbabwe	0	2	0	2
10	Soviet Union	0	1	0	1
11	Germany	0	0	1	1
11	Great Britain	0	0	1	1
11	Slovakia	0	0	1	1
11	Spain	0	0	1	1
Totals (14 entries)		22	22	22	66

=== 400 metre individual medley ===
Year	Gold	Silver	Bronze
1973 Belgrade	Gudrun Wegner; East Germany	Angela Franke; East Germany	Novella Calligaris; Italy
1975 Cali	Ulrike Tauber; East Germany	Karla Linke; East Germany	Kathy Heddy; United States
1978 West Berlin	Tracy Caulkins; United States	Ulrike Tauber; East Germany	Petra Schneider; East Germany
1982 Guayaquil	Petra Schneider; East Germany	Kathleen Nord; East Germany	Tracy Caulkins; United States
1986 Madrid	Kathleen Nord; East Germany	Michelle Griglione; United States	Noemi Lung; Romania
1991 Perth	Lin Li; China	Hayley Lewis; Australia	Summer Sanders; United States
1994 Rome	Dai Guohong; China	Allison Wagner; United States	Kristine Quance; United States
1998 Perth	Chen Yan; China	Yana Klochkova; Ukraine	Yasuko Tajima; Japan
2001 Fukuoka	Yana Klochkova; Ukraine	Martha Bowen; United States	Beatrice Câșlaru; Romania
2003 Barcelona	Yana Klochkova; Ukraine	Éva Risztov; Hungary	Beatrice Câșlaru; Romania
2005 Montreal	Katie Hoff; United States	Kirsty Coventry; Zimbabwe	Kaitlin Sandeno; United States
2007 Melbourne	Katie Hoff; United States	Yana Martynova; Russia	Stephanie Rice; Australia
2009 Rome	Katinka Hosszú; Hungary	Kirsty Coventry; Zimbabwe	Stephanie Rice; Australia
2011 Shanghai	Elizabeth Beisel; United States	Hannah Miley; Great Britain	Stephanie Rice; Australia
2013 Barcelona	Katinka Hosszú; Hungary	Mireia Belmonte; Spain	Elizabeth Beisel; United States
2015 Kazan	Katinka Hosszú; Hungary	Maya DiRado; United States	Emily Overholt; Canada
2017 Budapest	Katinka Hosszú; Hungary	Mireia Belmonte; Spain	Sydney Pickrem; Canada
2019 Gwangju	Katinka Hosszú (5); Hungary	Ye Shiwen; China	Yui Ohashi; Japan
2022 Budapest	Summer McIntosh; Canada	Katie Grimes; United States	Emma Weyant; United States
2023 Fukuoka	Summer McIntosh; Canada	Katie Grimes; United States	Jenna Forrester; Australia
2024 Doha	Freya Colbert; Great Britain	Anastasia Gorbenko; Israel	Sara Franceschi; Italy
2025 Singapore	Summer McIntosh; Canada	Jenna Forrester; Australia	none awarded
2025 Singapore	Summer McIntosh; Canada	Mio Narita; Japan	none awarded

Medal table

Rank	Nation	Gold	Silver	Bronze	Total
1	Hungary	5	1	0	6
2	United States	4	6	7	17
3	East Germany	4	4	1	9
4	China	3	1	0	4
5	Canada	3	0	2	5
6	Ukraine	2	1	0	3
7	Great Britain	1	1	0	2
8	Australia	0	2	4	6
9	Spain	0	2	0	2
9	Zimbabwe	0	2	0	2
11	Japan	0	1	2	3
12	Israel	0	1	0	1
12	Russia	0	1	0	1
14	Romania	0	0	3	3
15	Italy	0	0	2	2
Totals (15 entries)		22	23	21	66

=== 4 × 100 metre freestyle relay ===
Year	Gold	Silver	Bronze
1973 Belgrade	East Germany (GDR); Kornelia Ender; Andrea Eife; Andrea Hübner; Sylvia Eichner; Elke Sehmisch*; Angela Franke*	United States (USA); Kim Peyton; Kathy Heddy; Heather Greenwood; Shirley Babashoff; Keena Rothhammer*; Deena Deardurff*	West Germany (FRG); Jutta Weber; Heidemarie Reineck; Gudrun Beckman; Angela Steinbach
1975 Cali	East Germany (GDR); Kornelia Ender; Barbara Krause; Claudia Hempel; Ute Brückner; Marina Jank*; Birgit Treiber*	United States (USA); Kathy Heddy; Karen Reeser; Kelly Rowell; Shirley Babashoff; Bonnie Brown*; Jill Symons*	Canada (CAN); Gail Amundrud; Anne Jardin; Becky Smith; Jill Quick; Barbara Clark*
1978 West Berlin	United States (USA); Tracy Caulkins; Stephanie Elkins; Jill Sterkel; Cynthia Woodhead; Jennifer Hooker*; Missy Gehan*; Jane Abraham*	East Germany (GDR); Heike Witt; Caren Metschuck; Barbara Krause; Petra Priemer; Birgit Treiber*	Canada (CAN); Gail Amundrud; Nancy Garapick; Susan Sloan; Wendy Quirk; Carol Klimpel*
1982 Guayaquil	East Germany (GDR); Birgit Meineke; Susanne Link; Kristin Otto; Caren Metschuck; Kathleen Nord*	United States (USA); Susan Habernigg; Kathy Treible; Elisabeth Washut; Jill Sterkel; Marybeth Linzmeier*; Julie Williams*; Tracy Caulkins*	Netherlands (NED); Annemarie Verstappen; Annelies Maas; Wilma van Velsen; Conny van Bentum; Desi Reijers*
1986 Madrid	East Germany (GDR); Kristin Otto; Manuela Stellmach; Sabina Schulze; Heike Friedrich; Kornelia Gressler*; Karen König*; Nadja Bergknecht*	United States (USA); Jenna Johnson; Dara Torres; Mary T. Meagher; Betsy Mitchell; Laura Walker*; Aimee Berzins*; Mary Wayte*	Netherlands (NED); Conny van Bentum; Laura Leideritz; Karin Brienesse; Annemarie Verstappen
1991 Perth	United States (USA); Nicole Haislett; Julie Cooper; Whitney Hedgepeth; Jenny Thompson; Lynn Kohl*; Ashley Tappin*	Germany (GER); Simone Osygus; Kerstin Kielgass; Karin Seick; Manuela Stellmach; Katrin Meissner*; Daniela Hunger*	Netherlands (NED); Marianne Muis; Inge de Bruijn; Mildred Muis; Karin Brienesse; Diana van der Plaats*; Manon Masseurs*
1994 Rome	China (CHN); Le Jingyi; Shan Ying; Le Ying; Lü Bin	United States (USA); Angel Martino; Amy Van Dyken; Nicole Haislett; Jenny Thompson; Ashley Tappin*; Lindsey Farella*	Germany (GER); Franziska van Almsick; Katrin Meissner; Kerstin Kielgass; Daniela Hunger; Anja Kleber*; Anke Scholz*
1998 Perth	United States (USA); Lindsay Farella; Amy Van Dyken; Barbara Bedford; Jenny Thompson; Catherine Fox*; Melanie Valerio*	Germany (GER); Sandra Völker; Simone Osygus; Franziska van Almsick; Katrin Meissner; Antje Buschschulte*; Silvia Szalai*	Australia (AUS); Sarah Ryan; Rebecca Creedy; Susie O'Neill; Angela Kennedy; Kate Godfrey*
2001 Fukuoka	Germany (GER); Petra Dallmann; Antje Buschschulte; Katrin Meissner; Sandra Völker; Meike Freitag*	Great Britain (GBR); Alison Sheppard; Melanie Marshall; Rosalind Brett; Karen Pickering	none awarded
2001 Fukuoka	Germany (GER); Petra Dallmann; Antje Buschschulte; Katrin Meissner; Sandra Völker; Meike Freitag*	United States (USA); Colleen Lanne; Erin Phenix; Maritza Correia; Courtney Shealy; Tammie Stone*; Stefanie Williams*	none awarded
2003 Barcelona	United States (USA); Natalie Coughlin; Lindsay Benko; Rhi Jeffrey; Jenny Thompson (3); Gabrielle Rose*; Maritza Correia*	Germany (GER); Petra Dallmann; Katrin Meissner; Antje Buschschulte; Sandra Völker; Daniela Götz*; Alessa Ries*	Australia (AUS); Lisbeth Lenton; Elka Graham; Jodie Henry; Alice Mills; Sophie Edington*
2005 Montreal	Australia (AUS); Jodie Henry; Alice Mills; Shayne Reese; Libby Lenton; Sophie Edington*	Germany (GER); Petra Dallmann; Antje Buschschulte; Annika Liebs; Daniela Götz; Meike Freitag*	United States (USA); Natalie Coughlin; Kara Lynn Joyce; Lacey Nymeyer; Amanda Weir; Emily Silver*; Mary DeScenza*
2007 Melbourne	Australia (AUS); Libby Lenton; Melanie Schlanger; Shayne Reese; Jodie Henry; Danni Miatke*; Sally Foster*	United States (USA); Natalie Coughlin; Lacey Nymeyer; Amanda Weir; Kara Lynn Joyce; Dana Vollmer*	Netherlands (NED); Inge Dekker; Ranomi Kromowidjojo; Femke Heemskerk; Marleen Veldhuis; Chantal Groot*
2009 Rome	Netherlands (NED); Inge Dekker; Ranomi Kromowidjojo; Femke Heemskerk; Marleen Veldhuis; Hinkelien Schreuder*	Germany (GER); Britta Steffen; Daniela Samulski; Petra Dallmann; Daniela Schreiber	Australia (AUS); Lisbeth Trickett; Marieke Guehrer; Shayne Reese; Felicity Galvez; Sally Foster*; Meagan Nay*
2011 Shanghai	Netherlands (NED); Inge Dekker; Ranomi Kromowidjojo; Marleen Veldhuis; Femke Heemskerk; Maud van der Meer*	United States (USA); Natalie Coughlin; Missy Franklin; Jessica Hardy; Dana Vollmer; Amanda Weir*; Kara Lynn Joyce*	Germany (GER); Britta Steffen; Silke Lippok; Lisa Vitting; Daniela Schreiber
2013 Barcelona	United States (USA); Missy Franklin; Natalie Coughlin; Shannon Vreeland; Megan Romano; Simone Manuel*; Elizabeth Pelton*	Australia (AUS); Cate Campbell; Bronte Campbell; Emma McKeon; Alicia Coutts; Brittany Elmslie*; Emily Seebohm*	Netherlands (NED); Elise Bouwens; Femke Heemskerk; Inge Dekker; Ranomi Kromowidjojo; Esmee Vermeulen*
2015 Kazan	Australia (AUS); Emily Seebohm; Emma McKeon; Bronte Campbell; Cate Campbell; Madison Wilson*; Melanie Wright*; Bronte Barratt*	Netherlands (NED); Ranomi Kromowidjojo; Maud van der Meer; Marrit Steenbergen; Femke Heemskerk	United States (USA); Missy Franklin; Margo Geer; Lia Neal; Simone Manuel; Shannon Vreeland*; Abbey Weitzeil*
2017 Budapest	United States (USA); Mallory Comerford; Kelsi Worrell; Katie Ledecky; Simone Manuel; Lia Neal*; Olivia Smoliga*	Australia (AUS); Shayna Jack; Bronte Campbell; Brittany Elmslie; Emma McKeon; Emily Seebohm*; Madison Wilson*	Netherlands (NED); Kim Busch; Femke Heemskerk; Maud van der Meer; Ranomi Kromowidjojo
2019 Gwangju	Australia (AUS); Bronte Campbell; Brianna Throssell; Emma McKeon; Cate Campbell; Madison Wilson*	United States (USA); Mallory Comerford; Abbey Weitzeil; Kelsi Dahlia; Simone Manuel; Allison Schmitt*; Margo Geer*; Lia Neal*	Canada (CAN); Kayla Sanchez; Taylor Ruck; Penny Oleksiak; Maggie Mac Neil; Rebecca Smith*
2022 Budapest	Australia (AUS); Mollie O'Callaghan; Madison Wilson; Meg Harris; Shayna Jack; Leah Neale*; Brianna Throssell*	Canada (CAN); Kayla Sanchez; Taylor Ruck; Maggie Mac Neil; Penny Oleksiak; Rebecca Smith*; Katerine Savard*	United States (USA); Torri Huske; Erika Brown; Kate Douglass; Claire Curzan; Mallory Comerford*; Natalie Hinds*
2023 Fukuoka	Australia (AUS); Mollie O'Callaghan; Shayna Jack; Meg Harris; Emma McKeon (3); Brianna Throssell*; Madison Wilson* (1+3*)	United States (USA); Gretchen Walsh; Abbey Weitzeil; Olivia Smoliga; Kate Douglass; Torri Huske*; Maxine Parker*	China (CHN); Cheng Yujie; Yang Junxuan; Wu Qingfeng; Zhang Yufei; Ai Yanhan*; Zhu Menghui*
2024 Doha	Netherlands (NED); Kim Busch; Janna van Kooten; Kira Toussaint; Marrit Steenbergen; Milou van Wijk*	Australia (AUS); Brianna Throssell; Alexandria Perkins; Abbey Harkin; Shayna Jack; Jaclyn Barclay*	Canada (CAN); Rebecca Smith; Sarah Fournier; Katerine Savard; Taylor Ruck; Ella Jansen*
2025 Singapore	Australia (AUS); Mollie O'Callaghan (3); Meg Harris (3); Milla Jansen; Olivia Wunsch; Abbey Webb*; Hannah Casey*	United States (USA); Simone Manuel; Kate Douglass; Erin Gemmell; Torri Huske; Anna Moesch*	Netherlands (NED); Milou van Wijk; Tessa Giele; Sam van Nunen; Marrit Steenbergen; Femke Spiering*

* Swimmers who participated in the heats only.

Medal table

Rank	Nation	Gold	Silver	Bronze	Total
1	Australia	7	3	3	13
2	United States	6	11	3	20
3	East Germany	4	1	0	5
4	Netherlands	3	1	7	11
5	Germany	1	5	2	8
6	China	1	0	1	2
7	Canada	0	1	4	5
8	Great Britain	0	1	0	1
9	West Germany	0	0	1	1
Totals (9 entries)		22	23	21	66

=== 4 × 200 metre freestyle relay ===
Year	Gold	Silver	Bronze
1986 Madrid	East Germany (GDR); Manuela Stellmach; Astrid Strauß; Nadja Bergknecht; Heike Friedrich; Katja Hartmann*; Karen König*	United States (USA); Betsy Mitchell; Mary T. Meagher; Kimberley Brown; Mary Wayte; Julianne Brossman*; Debbie Babashoff*; Laura Walker*	Netherlands (NED); Annemarie Verstappen; Jolande van der Meer; Mildred Muis; Conny van Bentum
1991 Perth	Germany (GER); Kerstin Kielgass; Manuela Stellmach; Dagmar Hase; Stephanie Ortwig; Katrin Meissner*; Svenja Schlicht*	Netherlands (NED); Marianne Muis; Manon Masseurs; Mildred Muis; Karin Brienesse; Diana van der Plaats*	Denmark (DEN); Gitta Jenssen; Berit Puggaard; Annette Poulsen; Mette Jacobsen
1994 Rome	China (CHN); Le Ying; Yang Aihua; Zhou Guanbin; Lü Bin; Shan Ying*	Germany (GER); Kerstin Kielgass; Franziska van Almsick; Julia Jung; Dagmar Hase; Jutta Renner*; Anja Kleber*	United States (USA); Cristina Teuscher; Jenny Thompson; Janet Evans; Nicole Haislett; Ashley Tappin*; Dady Vincent*
1998 Perth	Germany (GER); Franziska van Almsick; Dagmar Hase; Silvia Szalai; Kerstin Kielgass; Antje Buschschulte*; Janina Götz*	United States (USA); Cristina Teuscher; Lindsay Benko; Brooke Bennett; Jenny Thompson; Trina Jackson*; Ashley Whitney*	Australia (AUS); Julia Greville; Anna Windsor; Susie O'Neill; Petria Thomas; Emma Johnson*
2001 Fukuoka	Great Britain (GBR); Nicola Jackson; Janine Belton; Karen Legg; Karen Pickering	Germany (GER); Silvia Szalai; Sarah Harstick; Hannah Stockbauer; Meike Freitag; Alessa Ries*	Japan (JPN); Maki Mita; Tomoko Hagiwara; Tomoko Nagai; Eri Yamanoi
2003 Barcelona	United States (USA); Lindsay Benko; Rachel Komisarz; Rhi Jeffrey; Diana Munz; Gabrielle Rose*; Margaret Hoelzer*	Australia (AUS); Elka Graham; Linda Mackenzie; Kirsten Thompson; Alice Mills; Giaan Rooney*; Heidi Crawford*; Melanie Houghton*	China (CHN); Zhou Yafei; Xu Yanwei; Jiaying Pang; Yang Yu
2005 Montreal	United States (USA); Natalie Coughlin; Katie Hoff; Whitney Myers; Kaitlin Sandeno; Mary DeScenza*; Caroline Burckle*; Rachel Komisarz*	Australia (AUS); Libby Lenton; Shayne Reese; Bronte Barratt; Linda Mackenzie; Melissa Mitchell*; Lara Davenport*	China (CHN); Zhu Yingwen; Pang Jiaying; Zhou Yafei; Yang Yu; Tang Jingzhi*
2007 Melbourne	United States (USA); Natalie Coughlin; Dana Vollmer; Lacey Nymeyer; Katie Hoff; Amanda Weir*; Margaret Hoelzer*; Kara Lynn Joyce*	Germany (GER); Meike Freitag; Britta Steffen; Petra Dallmann; Annika Lurz; Daniela Samulski*	France (FRA); Alena Popchanka; Sophie Huber; Aurore Mongel; Laure Manaudou; Céline Couderc*
2009 Rome	China (CHN); Yang Yu; Zhu Qianwei; Liu Jing; Pang Jiaying	United States (USA); Dana Vollmer; Lacey Nymeyer; Ariana Kukors; Allison Schmitt; Dagny Knutson*; Alyssa Anderson*	Great Britain (GBR); Joanne Jackson; Jazmin Carlin; Caitlin McClatchey; Rebecca Adlington; Hannah Miley*
2011 Shanghai	United States (USA); Missy Franklin; Dagny Knutson; Katie Hoff; Allison Schmitt; Jasmine Tosky*	Australia (AUS); Bronte Barratt; Blair Evans; Angie Bainbridge; Kylie Palmer; Jade Neilsen*	China (CHN); Chen Qian; Pang Jiaying; Liu Jing; Tang Yi; Zhu Qianwei*
2013 Barcelona	United States (USA); Katie Ledecky; Shannon Vreeland; Karlee Bispo; Missy Franklin; Chelsea Chenault*; Maya DiRado*; Jordan Mattern*	Australia (AUS); Bronte Barratt; Kylie Palmer; Brittany Elmslie; Alicia Coutts; Emma McKeon*; Ami Matsuo*	France (FRA); Camille Muffat; Charlotte Bonnet; Mylène Lazare; Coralie Balmy; Isabelle Mabboux*
2015 Kazan	United States (USA); Missy Franklin; Leah Smith; Katie McLaughlin; Katie Ledecky; Cierra Runge*; Chelsea Chenault*; Shannon Vreeland*	Italy (ITA); Alice Mizzau; Erica Musso; Chiara Masini Luccetti; Federica Pellegrini	China (CHN); Qiu Yuhan; Guo Junjun; Zhang Yufei; Shen Duo; Shao Yiwen*; Zhang Yuhan*
2017 Budapest	United States (USA); Leah Smith; Mallory Comerford; Melanie Margalis; Katie Ledecky; Cierra Runge*; Hali Flickinger*; Madisyn Cox*	China (CHN); Ai Yanhan; Liu Zixuan; Zhang Yuhan; Li Bingjie; Wang Jingzhuo*; Shen Duo*	Australia (AUS); Madison Wilson; Emma McKeon; Kotuku Ngawati; Ariarne Titmus; Shayna Jack*; Leah Neale*
2019 Gwangju	Australia (AUS); Ariarne Titmus; Madison Wilson; Brianna Throssell; Emma McKeon; Leah Neale*; Kiah Melverton*	United States (USA); Simone Manuel; Katie Ledecky; Melanie Margalis; Katie McLaughlin; Allison Schmitt*; Gabby DeLoof*; Leah Smith*	Canada (CAN); Kayla Sanchez; Taylor Ruck; Emily Overholt; Penny Oleksiak; Rebecca Smith*; Emma O'Croinin*
2022 Budapest	United States (USA); Claire Weinstein; Leah Smith; Katie Ledecky (4); Bella Sims; Alex Walsh*; Hali Flickinger*	Australia (AUS); Madison Wilson; Leah Neale; Kiah Melverton; Mollie O'Callaghan; Lani Pallister*; Brianna Throssell*; Kiah Melverton*	Canada (CAN); Summer McIntosh; Kayla Sanchez; Taylor Ruck; Penny Oleksiak; Mary-Sophie Harvey*; Katerine Savard*; Rebecca Smith*
2023 Fukuoka	Australia (AUS); Mollie O'Callaghan; Shayna Jack; Brianna Throssell; Ariarne Titmus; Madison Wilson*; Lani Pallister*; Kiah Melverton*	United States (USA); Erin Gemmell; Katie Ledecky; Bella Sims; Alex Shackell; Leah Smith*; Anna Peplowski*	China (CHN); Li Bingjie; Li Jiaping; Ai Yanhan; Liu Yaxin; Yang Peiqi*; Ge Chutong*
2024 Doha	China (CHN); Ai Yanhan; Gong Zhenqi; Li Bingjie; Yang Peiqi; Ma Yonghui*	Great Britain (GBR); Freya Colbert; Abbie Wood; Lucy Hope; Medi Harris	Australia (AUS); Brianna Throssell; Shayna Jack; Abbey Harkin; Kiah Melverton; Jaclyn Barclay*
2025 Singapore	Australia (AUS); Lani Pallister; Jamie Perkins; Brittany Castelluzzo; Mollie O'Callaghan; Abbey Webb*; Milla Jansen*; Hannah Casey*	United States (USA); Claire Weinstein; Anna Peplowski; Erin Gemmell; Katie Ledecky; Simone Manuel*; Anna Moesch*; Bella Sims*	China (CHN); Liu Yaxin; Yang Peiqi; Yu Yiting; Li Bingjie; Yu Zidi*; Wu Qingfeng*

* Swimmers who participated in the heats only.

Medal table

Rank	Nation	Gold	Silver	Bronze	Total
1	United States	8	6	1	15
2	Australia	3	5	3	11
3	China	3	1	6	10
4	Germany	2	3	0	5
5	Great Britain	1	1	1	3
6	East Germany	1	0	0	1
7	Netherlands	0	1	1	2
8	Italy	0	1	0	1
9	Canada	0	0	2	2
9	France	0	0	2	2
11	Denmark	0	0	1	1
11	Japan	0	0	1	1
Totals (12 entries)		18	18	18	54

=== 4 × 100 metre medley relay ===
Year	Gold	Silver	Bronze
1973 Belgrade	East Germany (GDR); Ulrike Richter; Renate Vogel; Rosemarie Kother; Kornelia Ender	United States (USA); Melissa Belote; Marcia Morey; Deena Deardurff; Shirley Babashoff	West Germany (FRG); Angelike Greiser; Petra Nows; Gudrun Beckmann; Jutta Weber
1975 Cali	East Germany (GDR); Ulrike Richter; Hannelore Anke; Rosemarie Kother; Kornelia Ender; Claudia Hempel*	United States (USA); Linda Jezek; Marcia Morey; Camille Wright; Shirley Babashoff; Tauna Vandeweghe*; Kim Dunson*; Jill Symons*; Kelly Rowell*	Netherlands (NED); Paula van Eijk; Wijda Mazereeuw; José Damen; Enith Brigitha
1978 West Berlin	United States (USA); Linda Jezek; Tracy Caulkins; Joan Pennington; Cynthia Woodhead; Kathy Treible*; Betsy Rapp*; Stephanie Elkins*	East Germany (GDR); Birgit Treiber; Ramona Reinke; Andrea Pollack; Barbara Krause; Heike Witt*	Soviet Union (URS); Yelena Kruglova; Yuliya Bogdanova; Irina Aksenova; Larisa Tsaryova; Lina Kačiušytė*; Alia Grishchenkova*
1982 Guayaquil	East Germany (GDR); Kristin Otto; Ute Geweniger; Ines Geissler; Birgit Meineke; Silke Hörner*	United States (USA); Susan Walsh; Kim Rhodenbaugh; Mary T. Meagher; Jill Sterkel; Libby Kinkead*; Jean Childs*; Melanie Buddemeyer*; Kathy Treible*	Soviet Union (URS); Larisa Gorchakova; Svetlana Varganova; Natalia Pokas; Irina Gerasimova; Larisa Belokon*; Inna Abramova*
1986 Madrid	East Germany (GDR); Kathrin Zimmermann; Sylvia Gerasch; Kornelia Gressler; Kristin Otto; Manuela Stellmach*	United States (USA); Betsy Mitchell; Jennifer Hau; Mary T. Meagher; Jenna Johnson; Ann Mahoney*; Cara Hafner*; Kara McGrath*; Laura Walker*	Netherlands (NED); Jolanda de Rover; Petra van Staveren; Conny van Bentum; Annemarie Verstappen
1991 Perth	United States (USA); Janie Wagstaff; Tracey McFarlane; Crissy Ahmann-Leighton; Nicole Haislett; Jodi Wilson*; Tori de Silvia*; Julia Gorman*; Jenny Thompson*	Australia (AUS); Nicole Livingston; Linley Frame; Susan O'Neill; Karen Van Wirdum; Johanna Griggs*	Germany (GER); Svenja Schlicht; Jana Doerries; Susanne Müller; Manuela Stellmach; Dagmar Hase*; Alexandra Haenel*; Katrin Jäke*; Kerstin Kielgass*
1994 Rome	China (CHN); He Cihong; Dai Guohong; Liu Limin; Le Jingyi; Yuan Yuan*; Qu Yun*; Shan Ying*	United States (USA); Lea Loveless; Kristine Quance; Amy Van Dyken; Jenny Thompson; Whitney Phelps*; Angel Martino*	Russia (RUS); Nina Zhivanevskaya; Olga Prokhorova; Svetlana Pozdeyeva; Natalya Meshcheryakova
1998 Perth	United States (USA); Lea Maurer; Kristy Kowal; Jenny Thompson; Amy Van Dyken; Beth Botsford*; Jenna Street*; Misty Hyman*; Barbara Bedford*	Australia (AUS); Meredith Smith; Helen Denman; Petria Thomas; Susan O'Neill; Samantha Riley*; Angela Kennedy*; Sarah Ryan*	Japan (JPN); Mai Nakamura; Masami Tanaka; Ayari Aoyama; Sumika Minamoto
2001 Fukuoka	Australia (AUS); Dyana Calub; Leisel Jones; Petria Thomas; Sarah Ryan; Clementine Stoney*; Tarnee White*; Elka Graham*	United States (USA); Natalie Coughlin; Megan Quann; Mary DeScenza; Erin Phenix; Courtney Shealy*; Shelly Ripple*; Maritza Correia*	China (CHN); Zhan Shu; Luo Xuejuan; Ruan Yi; Xu Yanwei
2003 Barcelona	China (CHN); Zhan Shu; Luo Xuejuan; Zhou Yafei; Yang Yu	United States (USA); Natalie Coughlin; Amanda Beard; Jenny Thompson; Lindsay Benko; Haley Cope*; Tara Kirk*; Mary DeScenza*	Australia (AUS); Giaan Rooney; Leisel Jones; Jessicah Schipper; Jodie Henry
2005 Montreal	Australia (AUS); Sophie Edington; Leisel Jones; Jessicah Schipper; Libby Lenton; Giaan Rooney*; Brooke Hanson*; Felicity Galvez*; Jodie Henry*	United States (USA); Natalie Coughlin; Jessica Hardy; Rachel Komisarz; Amanda Weir; Jeri Moss*; Tara Kirk*; Mary DeScenza*; Lacey Nymeyer*	Germany (GER); Antje Buschschulte; Sarah Poewe; Annika Mehlhorn; Daniela Götz
2007 Melbourne	Australia (AUS); Emily Seebohm; Leisel Jones; Jessicah Schipper; Libby Lenton; Tarnee White*; Felicity Galvez*; Jodie Henry*	United States (USA); Natalie Coughlin; Tara Kirk; Rachel Komisarz; Lacey Nymeyer; Leila Vaziri*; Jessica Hardy*; Dana Vollmer*; Amanda Weir*	China (CHN); Xutian Longzi; Luo Nan; Zhou Yafei; Xu Yanwei
2009 Rome	China (CHN); Zhao Jing; Chen Huijia; Jiao Liuyang; Li Zhesi	Australia (AUS); Emily Seebohm; Sarah Katsoulis; Jessicah Schipper; Lisbeth Trickett; Sally Foster*; Stephanie Rice*; Shayne Reese*	Germany (GER); Daniela Samulski; Sarah Poewe; Annika Mehlhorn; Britta Steffen; Daniela Schreiber*
2011 Shanghai	United States (USA); Natalie Coughlin; Rebecca Soni; Dana Vollmer; Missy Franklin; Elizabeth Pelton*; Christine Magnuson*; Amanda Weir*	China (CHN); Zhao Jing; Ji Liping; Lu Ying; Tang Yi; Gao Chang*; Sun Ye*; Jiao Liuyang*; Li Zhesi*	Australia (AUS); Belinda Hocking; Leisel Jones; Alicia Coutts; Merindah Dingjan; Stephanie Rice*
2013 Barcelona	United States (USA); Missy Franklin; Jessica Hardy; Dana Vollmer; Megan Romano; Elizabeth Pelton*; Breeja Larson*; Claire Donahue*; Shannon Vreeland*	Australia (AUS); Emily Seebohm; Sally Foster; Alicia Coutts; Cate Campbell; Samantha Marshall*; Emma McKeon*	Russia (RUS); Daria Ustinova; Yuliya Yefimova; Svetlana Chimrova; Veronika Popova; Anna Belousova*
2015 Kazan	China (CHN); Fu Yuanhui; Shi Jinglin; Lu Ying; Shen Duo; Chen Xinyi*; Qiu Yuhan*	Sweden (SWE); Michelle Coleman; Jennie Johansson; Sarah Sjöström; Louise Hansson	Australia (AUS); Emily Seebohm; Taylor McKeown; Emma McKeon; Bronte Campbell; Madison Wilson*; Lorna Tonks*; Madeline Groves*; Melanie Wright*
2017 Budapest	United States (USA); Kathleen Baker; Lilly King; Kelsi Worrell; Simone Manuel; Olivia Smoliga*; Katie Meili*; Sarah Gibson*; Mallory Comerford*	Russia (RUS); Anastasia Fesikova; Yuliya Yefimova; Svetlana Chimrova; Veronika Popova; Natalia Ivaneeva*	Australia (AUS); Emily Seebohm; Taylor McKeown; Emma McKeon; Bronte Campbell; Holly Barratt*; Jessica Hansen*; Brianna Throssell*; Shayna Jack*
2019 Gwangju	United States (USA); Regan Smith; Lilly King; Kelsi Dahlia; Simone Manuel; Olivia Smoliga*; Melanie Margalis*; Katie McLaughlin*; Mallory Comerford*	Australia (AUS); Minna Atherton; Jessica Hansen; Emma McKeon; Cate Campbell; Kaylee McKeown*; Brianna Throssell*; Madison Wilson*	Canada (CAN); Kylie Masse; Sydney Pickrem; Maggie Mac Neil; Penny Oleksiak; Kierra Smith*; Rebecca Smith*; Taylor Ruck*
2022 Budapest	United States (USA); Regan Smith; Lilly King; Torri Huske; Claire Curzan; Rhyan White*; Alex Walsh*; Natalie Hinds*; Erika Brown*	Australia (AUS); Kaylee McKeown; Jenna Strauch; Brianna Throssell; Mollie O'Callaghan; Madison Wilson*	Canada (CAN); Kylie Masse; Rachel Nicol; Maggie Mac Neil; Penny Oleksiak; Ingrid Wilm*; Kelsey Wog*; Kayla Sanchez*
2023 Fukuoka	United States (USA); Regan Smith; Lilly King; Gretchen Walsh; Kate Douglass; Katharine Berkoff*; Lydia Jacoby*; Torri Huske*; Abbey Weitzeil*	Australia (AUS); Kaylee McKeown; Abbey Harkin; Emma McKeon; Mollie O'Callaghan; Madison Wilson*; Brianna Throssell*; Meg Harris*	Canada (CAN); Kylie Masse; Sophie Angus; Maggie Mac Neil; Summer McIntosh; Ingrid Wilm*; Mary-Sophie Harvey*
2024 Doha	Australia (AUS); Iona Anderson; Abbey Harkin; Brianna Throssell; Shayna Jack; Jaclyn Barclay*; Alexandria Perkins*	Sweden (SWE); Louise Hansson; Sophie Hansson; Sarah Sjöström; Michelle Coleman; Hanna Rosvall*	Canada (CAN); Ingrid Wilm; Sophie Angus; Rebecca Smith; Taylor Ruck; Sydney Pickrem*; Katerine Savard*
2025 Singapore	United States (USA); Regan Smith; Kate Douglass; Gretchen Walsh; Torri Huske; Katharine Berkoff*; Lilly King* (4+1*); Claire Curzan*; Simone Manuel*	Australia (AUS); Kaylee McKeown; Ella Ramsay; Alexandria Perkins; Mollie O'Callaghan; Sienna Toohey*	China (CHN); Peng Xuwei; Tang Qianting; Zhang Yufei; Cheng Yujie; Wan Letian*; Yang Chang*; Yu Yiting*; Wu Qingfeng*

* Swimmers who participated in the heats only.

Medal table

Rank	Nation	Gold	Silver	Bronze	Total
1	United States	10	9	0	19
2	Australia	4	8	4	16
3	China	4	1	3	8
4	East Germany	4	1	0	5
5	Sweden	0	2	0	2
6	Russia	0	1	2	3
7	Canada	0	0	4	4
8	Germany	0	0	3	3
9	Netherlands	0	0	2	2
9	Soviet Union	0	0	2	2
11	Japan	0	0	1	1
11	West Germany	0	0	1	1
Totals (12 entries)		22	22	22	66

=== 4 × 100 metre mixed freestyle relay ===
Year	Gold	Silver	Bronze
2015 Kazan	United States (USA); Ryan Lochte; Nathan Adrian; Simone Manuel; Missy Franklin; Conor Dwyer*; Margo Geer*; Abbey Weitzeil*	Netherlands (NED); Sebastiaan Verschuren; Joost Reijns; Ranomi Kromowidjojo; Femke Heemskerk; Kyle Stolk*; Marrit Steenbergen*	Canada (CAN); Santo Condorelli; Yuri Kisil; Chantal Van Landeghem; Sandrine Mainville; Karl Krug*; Victoria Poon*
2017 Budapest	United States (USA); Caeleb Dressel; Nathan Adrian; Mallory Comerford; Simone Manuel; Blake Pieroni*; Townley Haas*; Lia Neal*; Kelsi Worrell*	Netherlands (NED); Ben Schwietert; Kyle Stolk; Femke Heemskerk; Ranomi Kromowidjojo; Maud van der Meer*	Canada (CAN); Yuri Kisil; Javier Acevedo; Chantal Van Landeghem; Penny Oleksiak; Markus Thormeyer*; Sandrine Mainville*
2019 Gwangju	United States (USA); Caeleb Dressel; Zach Apple; Mallory Comerford; Simone Manuel; Blake Pieroni*; Nathan Adrian*; Katie McLaughlin*; Abbey Weitzeil*	Australia (AUS); Kyle Chalmers; Clyde Lewis; Emma McKeon; Bronte Campbell; Cameron McEvoy*; Alexander Graham*; Brianna Throssell*; Madison Wilson*	France (FRA); Clément Mignon; Mehdy Metella; Charlotte Bonnet; Marie Wattel; Maxime Grousset*; Béryl Gastaldello*
2022 Budapest	Australia (AUS); Jack Cartwright; Kyle Chalmers; Madison Wilson; Mollie O'Callaghan; Zac Incerti*; William Yang*; Meg Harris*; Leah Neale*	Canada (CAN); Joshua Liendo; Javier Acevedo; Kayla Sanchez; Penny Oleksiak; Ruslan Gaziev*; Taylor Ruck*; Maggie Mac Neil*	United States (USA); Ryan Held; Brooks Curry; Torri Huske; Claire Curzan; Drew Kibler*; Erika Brown*; Kate Douglass*
2023 Fukuoka	Australia (AUS); Jack Cartwright; Kyle Chalmers; Shayna Jack; Mollie O'Callaghan; Flynn Southam*; Madison Wilson*; Meg Harris*	United States (USA); Jack Alexy; Matt King; Abbey Weitzeil; Kate Douglass; Chris Guiliano*; Olivia Smoliga*; Bella Sims*	Great Britain (GBR); Matthew Richards; Duncan Scott; Anna Hopkin; Freya Anderson; Jacob Whittle*; Tom Dean*; Lucy Hope*
2024 Doha	China (CHN); Pan Zhanle; Wang Haoyu; Li Bingjie; Yu Yiting; Ji Xinjie*; Ai Yanhan*	Australia (AUS); Kai Taylor; Jack Cartwright; Shayna Jack; Brianna Throssell; Alexandria Perkins*; Abbey Harkin*	United States (USA); Hunter Armstrong; Matt King; Claire Curzan; Kate Douglass; Luke Hobson*; Jack Aikins*; Addison Sauickie*; Kayla Han*
2025 Singapore	United States (USA); Jack Alexy; Patrick Sammon; Kate Douglass; Torri Huske; Chris Guiliano*; Jonny Kulow*; Simone Manuel* (3+1*)	Neutral Athletes B (NAB); Egor Kornev; Ivan Giryov; Daria Trofimova; Daria Klepikova; Vladislav Grinev*; Alina Gaifutdinova*; Milana Stepanova*	France (FRA); Maxime Grousset; Yann Le Goff; Marie Wattel; Béryl Gastaldello; Rafael Fente-Damers*; Albane Cachot*

* Swimmers who participated in the heats only.

Medal table

Rank	Nation	Gold	Silver	Bronze	Total
1	United States	4	1	2	7
2	Australia	2	2	0	4
3	China	1	0	0	1
4	Netherlands	0	2	0	2
5	Canada	0	1	2	3
6	Neutral Athletes B	0	1	0	1
7	France	0	0	2	2
8	Great Britain	0	0	1	1
Totals (8 entries)		7	7	7	21

=== 4 × 100 metre mixed medley relay ===
Year	Gold	Silver	Bronze
2015 Kazan	Great Britain (GBR); Chris Walker-Hebborn; Adam Peaty; Siobhan-Marie O'Connor; Fran Halsall; Ross Murdoch*; Rachael Kelly*	United States (USA); Ryan Murphy; Kevin Cordes; Katie McLaughlin; Margo Geer; Kendyl Stewart*; Lia Neal*	Germany (GER); Jan-Philip Glania; Hendrik Feldwehr; Alexandra Wenk; Annika Bruhn
2017 Budapest	United States (USA); Matt Grevers; Lilly King; Caeleb Dressel; Simone Manuel; Ryan Murphy*; Kevin Cordes*; Kelsi Worrell*; Mallory Comerford*	Australia (AUS); Mitch Larkin; Daniel Cave; Emma McKeon; Bronte Campbell; Kaylee McKeown*; Matthew Wilson*; Grant Irvine*; Shayna Jack*	Canada (CAN); Kylie Masse; Richard Funk; Penny Oleksiak; Yuri Kisil; Javier Acevedo*; Rebecca Smith*; Chantal Van Landeghem*
2017 Budapest	United States (USA); Matt Grevers; Lilly King; Caeleb Dressel; Simone Manuel; Ryan Murphy*; Kevin Cordes*; Kelsi Worrell*; Mallory Comerford*	Australia (AUS); Mitch Larkin; Daniel Cave; Emma McKeon; Bronte Campbell; Kaylee McKeown*; Matthew Wilson*; Grant Irvine*; Shayna Jack*	China (CHN); Xu Jiayu; Yan Zibei; Zhang Yufei; Zhu Menghui; Li Guangyuan*; Shi Jinglin*; Li Zhuhao*
2019 Gwangju	Australia (AUS); Mitch Larkin; Matthew Wilson; Emma McKeon; Cate Campbell; Minna Atherton*; Matthew Temple*; Bronte Campbell*	United States (USA); Ryan Murphy; Lilly King; Caeleb Dressel; Simone Manuel; Matt Grevers*; Andrew Wilson*; Kelsi Dahlia*; Mallory Comerford*	Great Britain (GBR); Georgia Davies; Adam Peaty; James Guy; Freya Anderson; James Wilby*
2022 Budapest	United States (USA); Hunter Armstrong; Nic Fink; Torri Huske; Claire Curzan; Ryan Murphy*; Lilly King*; Michael Andrew*; Erika Brown*	Australia (AUS); Kaylee McKeown; Zac Stubblety-Cook; Matthew Temple; Shayna Jack; Isaac Cooper*; Matthew Wilson*; Brianna Throssell*; Meg Harris*	Netherlands (NED); Kira Toussaint; Arno Kamminga; Nyls Korstanje; Marrit Steenbergen
2023 Fukuoka	China (CHN); Xu Jiayu; Qin Haiyang; Zhang Yufei; Cheng Yujie; Yan Zibei*; Wang Yichun*; Wu Qingfeng*	Australia (AUS); Kaylee McKeown; Zac Stubblety-Cook; Matthew Temple; Shayna Jack; Bradley Woodward*; Samuel Williamson*; Emma McKeon*	United States (USA); Ryan Murphy; Nic Fink; Torri Huske; Kate Douglass; Katharine Berkoff*; Josh Matheny*; Dare Rose*; Abbey Weitzeil*
2024 Doha	United States (USA); Hunter Armstrong (2); Nic Fink (2); Claire Curzan (2); Kate Douglass; Jack Aikins*; Jake Foster*; Rachel Klinker*; Addison Sauickie*	Australia (AUS); Bradley Woodward; Samuel Williamson; Brianna Throssell; Shayna Jack; Alexandria Perkins*; Abbey Harkin*	Great Britain (GBR); Medi Harris; Adam Peaty; Matthew Richards; Anna Hopkin; James Wilby*; Duncan Scott*
2025 Singapore	Neutral Athletes B (NAB); Miron Lifintsev; Kirill Prigoda; Daria Klepikova; Daria Trofimova; Danil Semianinov*; Aleksandra Kuznetsova*	China (CHN); Xu Jiayu; Qin Haiyang; Zhang Yufei; Wu Qingfeng; Dong Zhihao*; Yu Yiting*; Cheng Yujie*	Canada (CAN); Kylie Masse; Oliver Dawson; Joshua Liendo; Taylor Ruck; Ingrid Wilm*; Brooklyn Douthwright*

* Swimmers who participated in the heats only.

Medal table

Rank	Nation	Gold	Silver	Bronze	Total
1	United States	3	2	1	6
2	Australia	1	4	0	5
3	China	1	1	1	3
4	Great Britain	1	0	2	3
5	Neutral Athletes B	1	0	0	1
6	Canada	0	0	2	2
7	Germany	0	0	1	1
7	Netherlands	0	0	1	1
Totals (8 entries)		7	7	8	22

== All-time medal table 1973–2025 ==
Updated after the 2025 World Aquatics Championships.

=== Women's events ===
Rank	Nation	Gold	Silver	Bronze	Total
1	United States	120	104	85	309
2	Australia	60	68	44	172
3	East Germany	44	32	15	91
4	China	38	30	47	115
5	Sweden	17	14	8	39
6	Germany	14	24	20	58
7	Netherlands	14	15	26	55
8	Hungary	14	6	8	28
9	Canada	12	9	32	53
10	Italy	12	9	12	33
11	Russia	7	14	7	28
12	Great Britain	6	11	13	30
13	Lithuania	6	2	1	9
14	France	5	8	8	21
15	Denmark	4	9	6	19
16	Soviet Union	4	3	6	13
17	Ukraine	4	2	1	7
18	Zimbabwe	3	5	0	8
19	Japan	2	8	19	29
20	Spain	2	5	2	9
21	Poland	2	4	3	9
22	Romania	2	1	6	9
23	Belarus	2	1	1	4
24	New Zealand	1	3	5	9
25	South Africa	1	2	2	5
26	Hong Kong	1	2	1	4
27	Brazil	1	2	0	3
28	Costa Rica	1	1	2	4
29	Finland	1	0	0	1
29	Serbia	1	0	0	1
31	Slovakia	0	3	2	5
32	Switzerland	0	3	1	4
33	Belgium	0	1	2	3
34	Bulgaria	0	1	1	2
34	Jamaica	0	1	1	2
34	Norway	0	1	1	2
37	Czech Republic	0	1	0	1
37	Israel	0	1	0	1
37	Neutral Athletes B	0	1	0	1
40	Egypt	0	0	3	3
41	Austria	0	0	2	2
41	West Germany	0	0	2	2
43	Bosnia and Herzegovina	0	0	1	1
43	Neutral Athletes A	0	0	1	1
43	Neutral Independent Athletes	0	0	1	1
Totals (45 entries)		401	407	398	1,206

=== Mixed events ===
Rank	Nation	Gold	Silver	Bronze	Total
1	United States	7	3	3	13
2	Australia	3	6	0	9
3	China	2	1	1	4
4	Neutral Athletes B	1	1	0	2
5	Great Britain	1	0	3	4
6	Netherlands	0	2	1	3
7	Canada	0	1	4	5
8	France	0	0	2	2
9	Germany	0	0	1	1
Totals (9 entries)		14	14	15	43

== Multiple medalists ==
Boldface denotes active swimmers and highest medal count among all swimmers (including these who not included in these tables) per type.

=== All events ===
Rank	Swimmer	Country	From	To	Gold	Silver	Bronze	Total
1	**Katie Ledecky**	United States	2013	2025	**23**	6	1	**30**
2	**Sarah Sjöström**	Sweden	2009	2024	14	8	3	25
3	**Simone Manuel**	United States	2013	2025	13 ***	5 *	2	20 ****
4	Lilly King	United States	2017	2025	12 **	2	–	14 **
5	**Mollie O'Callaghan**	Australia	2022	2025	11	6	–	17
6	Missy Franklin	United States	2011	2015	11	2	3	16
7	Katinka Hosszú	Hungary	2009	2019	9	1	5	15
8	Natalie Coughlin	United States	2001	2013	8 #	7	5	20 #
9	Madison Wilson	Australia	2015	2023	8 *****	7 *****	2 *	17 &
10	Libby Trickett (Lenton)	Australia	2005	2009	8	3	4	15

* including one medal in the relay event in which she participated in the heats only
** including two medals in the relay events in which she participated in the heats only
*** including three medals in the relay events in which she participated in the heats only
**** including four medals in the relay events in which she participated in the heats only
***** including five medals in the relay events in which she participated in the heats only
& including eleven medals in the relay events in which she participated in the heats only
# At the 2001 World Aquatics Championships in Fukuoka, Japan, in the Women's 4 × 200 m freestyle relay, the Australian team finished first but was disqualified for jumping into the pool in celebration before all teams finished the race. The US team finished second, but was disqualified for improper changeover. This was later blamed on the faulty touchpad. In accordance with the decision of the FINA Bureau (2001, Bangkok): "To avoid any reasonable doubt regarding the result of the Women’s relay 4x200m Freestyle Final of the 9th FINA World Championships in Fukuoka but without unfairly changing the official results of the race, the Bureau decided to grant a second set of gold medals to the USA team." Natalie Coughlin was one of four members of the USA team.

=== Individual events ===
Rank	Swimmer	Country	From	To	Gold	Silver	Bronze	Total
1	**Katie Ledecky**	United States	2013	2025	**18**	3	1	22
2	**Sarah Sjöström**	Sweden	2009	2024	14	6	3	**23**
3	Katinka Hosszú	Hungary	2009	2019	9	1	**5**	15
4	**Summer McIntosh**	Canada	2022	2025	8	1	2	11
5	**Yuliya Yefimova**	Russia	2009	2019	6	6	3	15
6	Federica Pellegrini	Italy	2005	2019	6	3	1	10
7	**Rūta Meilutytė**	Lithuania	2013	2025	6	2	1	9
8	**Kaylee McKeown**	Australia	2019	2025	6	2	–	8
9	Lilly King	United States	2017	2023	5	1	–	6
10	Hannah Stockbauer	Germany	2001	2003	5	–	1	6

== See also ==
- List of World Aquatics Championships medalists in swimming (men)
- List of World Aquatics Championships medalists in open water swimming
- List of individual gold medalists in swimming at the Olympics and World Aquatics Championships (women)
- List of gold medalist relay teams in swimming at the Olympics and World Aquatics Championships
- List of Olympic medalists in swimming (women)
