= Doping in China =

The People's Republic of China was alleged to have conducted a state-sanctioned doping operation in the 1980s and 1990s by former General Administration of Sport physician Xue Yinxian. The World Anti-Doping Agency investigated these allegations and found no evidence to corroborate them. Other allegations of doping have focused on swimmers and track and field athletes, such as those taught by Ma Junren (the Ma Family Army). In the Olympics, China has been stripped of a total of three gold medals for doping; all were weightlifters competing in the 2008 Summer Olympics. Eleven Chinese athletes were stripped of medals for doping at the 1994 Asian Games.

Doping in the country has been attributed to a number of factors, such as the exchange of culture and technology with foreign countries. Some scholars believe that China has become the focus of Western anti-doping condemnation in place of East Germany and other former Eastern Bloc countries.

== History ==
=== Chinese swimming performances in the 1990s ===
The 1994 Hiroshima games saw seven Chinese swimmers along with a hurdler, a cyclist and two canoeists stripped of their medals after testing positive for the steroid dihydrotestosterone. In response, Chinese officials in March 1995 handed 1 year bans to nine coaches for doping in the Hiroshima games. FINA and the Olympic Council of Asia noted in the same month that there was not enough evidence to say organised doping was occurring in China, but the former said more testing was needed.

FINA, swimming's governing body, said Wang Wei of China's men's team and Wang Luna, Cai Huijue and Zhang Yi of the women's team tested positive for the banned diuretic triamterene and were immediately suspended at the 1998 World Aquatics Championships in Perth, Australia. Yuan Yuan, a swimmer caught by Australian customs on 8 January with human growth hormones in her suitcase, was given a four-year suspension. Coach Zhou Zhewen, who said he put the drugs in the suitcase, was banned for 15 years, although FINA said it would review his case after 10 years. IOC President Juan Antonio Samaranch said drug use by Chinese athletes had hurt that country's hopes of holding the Summer Games. Meanwhile, the Chinese Swimming Association said it was deeply shocked by the positive drug tests and would impose "serious punishment" on those involved. Following an investigation into China the next month, the International Swimming Federation rejected allegations that the country had a national doping programme.

As a result of the 1990s swimming scandals, the record-breaking performance of Chinese swimmer Ye Shiwen in the 2012 Olympics drew doping suspicions fuelled by a report by Craig Lord in The Times on July 30 that explained how the swimmer had become the first woman in history to complete an Olympic swimming final at a pace faster than men in the equivalent race in any event on the program. The suspicions were further fuelled by reporting from BBC presenter Clare Balding, American Swimming Coaches Association executive director John Leonard, and The Guardian. Several past Olympic champions also defended Ye, including former British swimmer Adrian Moorhouse who said: "I understand it’s about China’s system. But we saw the Chinese swimmers in the 1990s. They were the size of houses. They looked like they had huge muscle growth. This girl is quite small… she’s just in good shape."

=== Ma Junren and his Ma Family Army ===
In February 2016, Tencent Sports reported a letter written in 1995 by Wang Junxia and nine other track athletes, who claimed that women coached by Ma Junren were forced to take "large doses of illegal drugs over the years". According to Reuters and former State General Administration of Sports Director General Yuan Weimin, Ma and six of his runners were dropped from the 2000 Summer Olympics because they were tested positive for doping.

The International Association of Athletics Federations confirmed they had launched a probe into the claims and asked the Chinese Athletics Association to assist it in verifying whether the letter is genuine. An official from the Chinese Athletics Association declined to comment to Reuters on the matter.

=== Xue Yinxian allegations ===
Systematic doping of Chinese athletes in Olympic Games (and other international sport events) was alleged by former Chinese doctor Xue Yinxian as early as 2012. She claimed that more than 10,000 athletes in China were doping systematically in the 1980s and 1990s but admitted in 2024 that she did not personally witness any wrongdoing. The Chinese government denied involvement in systematic doping, claiming that athletes who doped did so individually. Xue said she was persecuted by the Chinese government for her allegations and had to seek asylum in Germany, which was granted in 2017. The World Anti-Doping Agency (WADA) said there is insufficient evidence to substantiate Xue's allegation of a large-scale doping scheme in the 1980s and the 1990s. As for samples retained from 2008, 2012, and 2016, WADA re-tested them but found no corroborating evidence.

=== Trimetazidine Findings and WADA Clearance in swimming ===
23 Chinese swimmers tested positive for the banned medication trimetazidine (TMZ) at the Shijiazhuang Chinese Long Course Invitational from 31 December 2020 to 3 January 2021, but the results were treated as caused by kitchen contamination of beef noodles without being made public. The story was first reported on 20 April 2024 by The New York Times and German broadcaster ARD. After delays owing to the COVID-19 pandemic, the China Anti-Doping Agency (CHINADA) logged the 60 urine samples - of which 28 were positive - into WADA's Anti-Doping Administration and Management System (ADAMS) at the WADA-accredited laboratory in Beijing on or around 15 March 2021. Per The New York Times, an email on this date from a CHINADA legal official requested a "counterpart at the world swimming association" to "keep athletes’ information and the case strictly confidential until it is publicly disclosed by CHINADA." Of the 23, 13 competed at the 2020 Summer Olympics seven months later where several of them, such as Zhang Yufei and Wang Shun, received medals. The New York Times reported that WADA did not refer the positive tests to its Intelligence and Investigations (I&I) Department. The matter is widely censored in China.

In 2022, the International Testing Agency (ITA) raised issues with WADA regarding a possible misreporting of the TMZ samples. WADA I&I subsequently reviewed these issues and "concluded that proper procedures had been followed and that there was no evidence of wrongdoing." The New York Times states that the ITA's review of the case is ongoing.

On 23 April 2024, ARD released a documentary, "The China File", where USADA's CEO Travis Tygart suggests of a "cover-up" by WADA and Fritz Sörgel, a toxicologist and pharmacologist, deems the contamination explanations to be "implausible". In separate statements, Tygart once again criticised WADA of its handling of the positive tests and said TMZ "doesn't magically appear, fairy dust in a kitchen." WADA said the test results were compatible with contamination, and not with deliberate doping. They explained that the 23 swimmers (with 28 positive samples) came from different regions and clubs but only tested positive while staying at the same hotel during a meet. Their test results consistently showed very low levels of the substance, with fluctuations from negative to positive within hours - a pattern deemed inconsistent with deliberate doping or micro-dosing. Some had tested positive on one day and negative the next, further indicating contamination. Meanwhile, athletes from the same team but who stayed in different hotels did not test positive.

USADA, along with the director of the Office of National Drug Control Policy Rahul Gupta, called for an independent investigation into the matter. In a statement on 25 April 2024, WADA responded to these allegations by appointing Swiss attorney Eric Cottier as an independent investigator to review its handling of the case. USADA called the appointment "self-serving."

On July 9, Eric Cottier concluded that WADA did not mishandle the Chinese swimmers' doping case or show bias. His interim report stated, "There is nothing in the file... to suggest that WADA showed favouritism or in any way favoured the 23 swimmers who tested positive for trimetazidine (TMZ) between January 1 and 3, 2021." He also found no evidence of "interference or meddling" from within WADA, Chinada, or Chinese authorities. Cottier stated Wada's decision not to appeal against Chinada's conclusion was "reasonable, both from the point of view of the facts and the applicable rules".

In July 2024, World Aquatics, which also found no wrongdoing on the part of Chinese swimmers after its own investigations, confirmed that its executive director was subpoenaed to testify to U.S. authorities as part of a criminal investigation into the Chinese swimmers' doping tests. It was reported in July 2024 that the Federal Bureau of Investigation (FBI) opened an investigation into whether the World Anti-Doping Agency (WADA) did not adequately investigate the doping case involving Chinese swimmers. Between January and July 2024, Chinese swimmers were tested 21 times in average by anti-doping agencies, compared to four to six times for Australian and U.S. swimmers respectively.

In September 2024, Cottier released his final report noting that some rules were not followed by CHINADA but this did not affect the "acceptance of the contamination hypothesis". The report said WADA did not show favouritism but its administrative processes could be strengthened. The findings largely matched Cottier's June interim report.

== Disqualified medalists ==
Listed below are athletes who have had their medals being stripped due to doping violations.

=== Olympic Games ===
Medal	Name	Sport	Event	Date
Gold	Chen Xiexia	Weightlifting	Women's 48 kg	9 August 2008
Gold	Liu Chunhong	Weightlifting	Women's 69 kg	13 August 2008
Gold	Cao Lei	Weightlifting	Women's 75 kg	15 August 2008

=== Asian Games ===
Name	NOC	Sport	Banned substance	Medals	Ref
Han Qing	China	Athletics	Dihydrotestosterone	(gold) (Women's 400 m hurdles)	
Zhang Lei	China	Canoeing	Dihydrotestosterone	(gold) (Men's C-1 500 m); (gold) (Men's C-1 1000 m); (silver) (Men's C-2 500 m)	
Qiu Suoren	China	Canoeing	Dihydrotestosterone	(silver) (Men's C-2 1000 m)	
Wang Yan	China	Cycling	Dihydrotestosterone	(gold) (Women's sprint)	
Fu Yong	China	Swimming	Dihydrotestosterone	(bronze) (Men's 400 m individual medley)	
Hu Bin	China	Swimming	Dihydrotestosterone	(gold) (Men's 50 m freestyle)	
Lü Bin	China	Swimming	Dihydrotestosterone	(gold) (Women's 50 m freestyle); (gold) (Women's 200 m freestyle); (gold) (Women's 200 m individual medley); (gold) (Women's 4 × 100 m freestyle relay); (silver) (Women's 100 m freestyle); (silver) (Women's 100 m backstroke)	
Xiong Guoming	China	Swimming	Dihydrotestosterone	(gold) (Men's 200 m freestyle); (gold) (Men's 200 m individual medley); (gold) (Men's 400 m individual medley); (gold) (Men's 4 × 200 m freestyle relay); (silver) (Men's 4 × 100 m freestyle relay)	
Yang Aihua	China	Swimming	Dihydrotestosterone	(silver) (Women's 400 m freestyle)	
Zhang Bin	China	Swimming	Dihydrotestosterone	(gold) (Men's 200 m butterfly)	
Zhou Guanbin	China	Swimming	Dihydrotestosterone	(gold) (Women's 400 m freestyle); (silver) (Women's 800 m freestyle)	

== Individual Chinese doping cases ==
- Yang Aihua – testosterone
- Wu Yanyan – anabolic steroids
- Li Zhesi – erythropoietin (EPO)
- Ouyang Kunpeng
- Chen Xinyi – hydrochlorothiazide
- Ye Qiaobo
- Wang Xiuli

== Reactions ==
Jinxia Dong, an associate professor at Peking University, said that the doping programme was a by-product of the "open door" policy which saw the rapid expansion within China of modern cultural and technological exchanges with foreign countries. Former East German swim coaches admitted to systematic doping on their athletes; among them, coach Klaus Rudolf played a significant role in developing China's swimming programme.

Bioethicist Maxwell J. Mehlman in his 2009 book The Price of Perfection, states that "In effect China has replaced East Germany as the target of Western condemnation of state-sponsored doping". Mehlman quotes an anthropologist as saying that "When China became a 'world sports power', American journalists found it all too easy to slip China into the slot of the 'Big Red Machine' formally occupied by Soviet Bloc teams".

== See also ==
- Swimming at the 1998 World Aquatics Championships
- Doping at the Asian Games
- Sport in China
- China at the Asian Games
- China at the Olympics
- China at the Paralympics
- China at the Universiade
