= 1993 FINA World Swimming Championships (25 m) – Men's 200 metre breaststroke =

These are the official results of the Men's 200 metres Breaststroke event at the 1993 FINA Short Course World Championships held in Palma de Mallorca, Spain between 2 and 5 December 1993.

== Finals ==
| RANK | FINAL A | TIME |
|---|---|---|
| | Nick Gillingham (GBR) | 2:07.91 ER |
| | Phil Rogers (AUS) | 2:08.32 |
| | Eric Wunderlich (USA) | 2:08.49 |
| 4. | Joaquín Fernández (ESP) | 2:09.52 |
| 5. | Damian Bawden (AUS) | 2:10.37 |
| 6. | Sergio López Miró (ESP) | 2:10.59 |
| 7. | Dariusz Jarzyna (POL) | 2:10.77 |
| 8. | Jonathan Cleveland (CAN) | 2:11.14 |

== Qualifying heats ==
| RANK | HEATS RANKING | TIME |
|---|---|---|
| 1. | Eric Wunderlich (USA) | 2:09.63 |
| 2. | Nick Gillingham (GBR) | 2:10.85 |
| 3. | Dariusz Jarzyna (POL) | 2:11.15 |
| 4. | Joaquín Fernández (ESP) | 2:11.17 |
| 5. | Jonathan Cleveland (CAN) | 2:11.20 |
| 6. | Sergio López Miró (ESP) | 2:11.26 |
| 7. | Phil Rogers (AUS) | 2:11.83 |
| 8. | Damian Bawden (AUS) | 2:12.45 |

== See also ==
- 1992 Men's Olympic Games 200m Breaststroke
- 1993 Men's European LC Championships 200m Breaststroke
