= China Anti-Doping Agency =

Chinese agency against drug use in sport

Agency overview
- Formed: 2007; 19 years ago
- Preceding agency: Doping Control Center of the Institute of Sports Medicine of the National Sports Commission
- Jurisdiction: China
- Parent agency: General Administration of Sport of China
- Website: www.chinada.cn

The China Anti-Doping Agency (CHINADA; 中国反兴奋剂中心), established in 2007, is the national anti-doping agency of the People's Republic of China. The predecessor was the Doping Control Center of the Institute of Sports Medicine of the National Sports Commission (国家体委运动医学研究所兴奋剂检测中心), which was established in 1987.

== History ==
In 1987, China began to prepare for the establishment of an anti-doping testing center. On November 10, 1989, the Chinese Doping Control Center received the qualification examination from the Medical Commission of International Olympic Committee and passed it successfully.

On the morning of November 12, 2007, the China Anti-Doping Agency located in the National Olympic Sports Center was officially inaugurated. Duan Shijie, Deputy Director General of the General Administration of Sport of China and Executive Vice Chairman of the Beijing Organizing Committee for the Olympic Games, Du Lijun, director of the China Anti-Doping Agency, and other leaders attended the opening ceremony. There are six departments, including doping control and education and information. The staff consists of some personnel from the Institute of Sports Medicine of the State General Administration of Sport and relevant personnel from the Anti-Doping Committee of the Chinese Olympic Committee.

In 2022, for the first time, dried blood spot testing has been used as a routine means of doping control at the Beijing Winter Olympic Games. The Dried Blood Spot Doping Control Testing Program is an anti-doping technology jointly initiated by organizations and institutions such as the World Anti-Doping Agency (WADA), the International Olympic Committee (IOC), the International Testing Agency (ITA), and the China Anti-Doping Agency. As one of the initiators of the Global Dried Blood Spot Program, CHINADA has participated in all aspects of the research on the rules and methods of the program, especially in the development of dried blood spot doping control equipment.

== See also ==
- Doping in China
