= Norbert Rózsa =

Hungarian swimmer (born 1972)

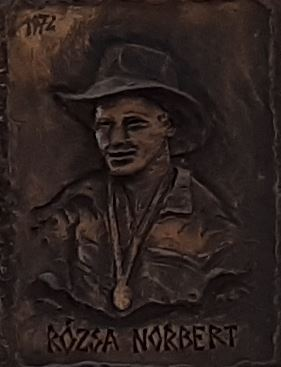

Personal information
- Full name: Norbert Rózsa
- Nationality: Hungary
- Born: 9 February 1972 (age 54) Dombóvár, Tolna, Hungary
- Height: 1.86 m (6 ft 1 in)
- Weight: 83 kg (183 lb)

Sport
- Sport: Swimming
- Strokes: Breaststroke
- Club: Budapesti Rendészeti Sportegyesület; OTP-Sport Plusz Sportegyesület; Sport-Plusz Mahart Sportegyesület
Medal record
Men's swimming
Representing Hungary
Olympic Games
Gold medal – first place	1996 Atlanta	200 m breaststroke
Silver medal – second place	1992 Barcelona	100 m breaststroke
Silver medal – second place	1992 Barcelona	200 m breaststroke
World Championships (LC)
Gold medal – first place	1991 Perth	100 m breaststroke
Gold medal – first place	1994 Rome	100 m breaststroke
Gold medal – first place	1994 Rome	200 m breaststroke
Silver medal – second place	1991 Perth	200 m breaststroke
Bronze medal – third place	1994 Rome	4×100 m medley
Bronze medal – third place	1998 Perth	200 m breaststroke
Bronze medal – third place	1998 Perth	4×100 m medley
European Championships (LC)
Gold medal – first place	1991 Athens	100 m breaststroke
Silver medal – second place	1991 Athens	200 m breaststroke
Bronze medal – third place	1991 Athens	4×100 m medley

Norbert Rózsa (born 9 February 1972) is a former breaststroker from Hungary, who competed at three consecutive Olympics, beginning with the 1992 Summer Olympics in Barcelona. He won two silver medals, in the 100 m and 200 m breaststroke, and became Olympic champion in Atlanta, Georgia, in the 200 m breaststroke.

He was elected Hungarian Sportsman of the Year in 1994 for winning two gold medals at that year's World Aquatics Championships.

After retirement from sport he was battling depression. In May 2007, he was hospitalized after a suicide attempt. He recovered from depression in about a year time and later he became interested in working as a graphic designer.

== Awards ==
- Masterly youth athlete: 1989
- OSH Victory medal for the World Champion (1991)
- Cross of Merit of the Republic of Hungary – Golden Cross (1992)
- OTSH Victory medal for the World Champion (1994)
- Hungarian swimmer of the Year (3): 1994, 1996, 1998
- Hungarian Sportsman of the Year (1) - votes of sports journalists: 1994
- Order of Merit of the Republic of Hungary – Officer's Cross (1996)
- Member of International Swimming Hall of Fame (2005)
- Immortal of Hungarian swimming (2014)

== See also ==
- List of members of the International Swimming Hall of Fame

Records
Preceded by (United Kingdom) Adrian Moorhouse	Men's 100 metre breaststroke world record holder (long course); 7 January 1991 – 11 June 1991	Succeeded by (Soviet Union) Vasili Ivanov
Preceded by (Soviet Union) Vasili Ivanov	Men's 100 metre breaststroke world record holder (long course); 20 August 1991 – 3 August 1993	Succeeded by (Hungary) Károly Güttler
Preceded by Antal Kovács	Hungarian Sportsman of The Year; 1994	Succeeded by Imre Pulai
