= Joaquín Fernández (swimmer) =

Spanish swimmer (born 1971)

Personal information
- Born: 22 January 1971 (age 55)
Medal record
Men's Swimming
Representing Spain
World Championships (SC)
Silver medal – second place	1993 Palma	4×100m Medley

Joaquín Fernández Corredor (born 22 January 1971 in Mataró, Catalonia) is a former medley and breaststroke swimmer from Spain. He competed at three consecutive Summer Olympics for his native country, starting in 1988 in Seoul, South Korea.
