= Le Ying =

Chinese swimmer

Medal record

Women's swimming

Representing China

Asian Games
Gold medal – first place	1994 Hiroshima	200 m freestyle

World Championships (LC)
Gold medal – first place	1994 Rome	4×100 m freestyle
Gold medal – first place	1994 Rome	4×200 m freestyle

Le Ying (simplified Chinese: 乐滢; traditional Chinese: 樂滢; pinyin: Lè Yīń) is a retired Chinese swimmer, who specialized in sprint and middle-distance freestyle events. At the 1994 FINA World Championships in Rome, Italy, Le, along with her teammates Shan Ying, Lü Bin, and Le Jingyi, powered past the entire field to capture the 4×100 m freestyle relay title and demolished a new world record of 3:37.91, slicing 1.55 seconds off the standard set by the U.S. team of Nicole Haislett, Angel Martino, Jenny Thompson, and Dara Torres from the 1992 Summer Olympics in Barcelona. The following month, at the Asian Games in Hiroshima, Japan, Le edged out Japan's Eri Yamanoi on the final lap to overhaul a two-minute barrier and claim a gold medal in the 200 m freestyle with a sterling time of 1:59.77.
