= Eric Wunderlich =

American swimmer

Personal information
- Full name: Eric Allen Wunderlich
- National team: United States
- Born: May 22, 1970 (age 56)
- Height: 6 ft 3 in (1.91 m)
- Weight: 205 lb (93 kg)

Sport
- Sport: Swimming
- Strokes: Breaststroke
- Club: Club Wolverine
- College team: University of Michigan
Medal record
Men's swimming
Representing the United States
World Championships (LC)
Gold medal – first place	1991 Perth	4×100 m medley
Gold medal – first place	1994 Rome	4×100 m medley
Silver medal – second place	1994 Rome	200 m breaststroke
World Championships (SC)
Gold medal – first place	1993 Palma	4×100 m medley
Bronze medal – third place	1993 Palma	200 m breaststroke
Pan Pacific Championships
Gold medal – first place	1995 Atlanta	100 m breaststroke
Gold medal – first place	1995 Atlanta	4×100 m medley
Silver medal – second place	1995 Atlanta	200 m breaststroke
Bronze medal – third place	1991 Edmonton	200 m breaststroke
Bronze medal – third place	1993 Kobe	200 m breaststroke

Eric Allen Wunderlich (born May 22, 1970) is an American former competition swimmer and breaststroke specialist who represented the United States at the 1996 Summer Olympics in Atlanta, Georgia. He won two gold medals at the FINA World Aquatics Championships in the men's 4×100-meter medley relay event (1991 and 1994).

== See also ==
- List of World Aquatics Championships medalists in swimming (men)
