= Royce Sharp =

American swimmer (born 1972)

Personal information
- Full name: James Royce Sharp Jr.
- National team: United States
- Born: May 25, 1972 (age 54) Houston, Texas, U.S.
- Occupation: Securities trader
- Height: 6 ft 0 in (1.83 m)
- Weight: 150 lb (68 kg)

Sport
- Sport: Swimming
- Event: 100, 200 backstroke
- Strokes: Backstroke
- College team: University of Michigan
- Coach: Chris Martin (Peddie School); Jon Urbanchek (U. Michigan); Eddie Reese (1992 Olympics)
Medal record
Men's swimming
Representing the United States
World Championships (LC)
Bronze medal – third place	1994 Rome	200 m backstroke
Pan Pacific Championships
Gold medal – first place	1993 Kobe	200 m backstroke

James Royce Sharp Jr. (born May 25, 1972) is an American former competition swimmer and backstroke specialist, who competed for the University of Michigan, and represented the United States at the 1992 Summer Olympics in Barcelona, Spain. Sharp set a new American record of 1:58.86 in the 200-meter backstroke, while placing first in the event at the 1992 Olympic trials in Indianapolis, Indiana. At the 1992 Barcelona Olympics, he competed in the men's 200-meter backstroke, where he finished eighteenth overall. He has since had a career as a securities trader in greater Houston, and Austin, Texas.

== Early life ==
Sharp was born May 25, 1972 in Houston, Texas one of two sons to mother Margaret Jones Sharp and father James Royce Sharp. Though he had started competitive swimming in a small, local program by Junior High, he had a few life issues while attending Revere Middle School and as a Freshman at Houston's Lee High School, where he became part of a less disciplined crowd and may have experienced issues with alcohol use. Watching his grades slip in his first Freshman semester at Lee High School, he transferred to the Peddie School for ninth grade, a structured co-ed college preparatory school, where he boarded in Highstown, New Jersey beginning around 1987.

Swimming for the Peddie School under Coach Chris Martin in both his High School Junior and Senior years, Sharp captured a first in the Eastern Interscholastic Swimming Championships in one of his signature events, the 100-yard backstroke, and established a new national Prep High School record in the event in 1991. He captured a national junior title and established a new age group record in the 200-meter backstroke event, which became his specialty. Sharp's Prep Coach Chris Martin noted Royce had an unconventional backstroke style, engaging his entire body, using a strong kick, and often accelerating through each length.

Sharp attended the 1988 Olympic trials in Austin, Texas as an observer only, and already harbored hopes of making the Olympic team in the next Olympics.

At the 1992 American Olympic trials in Indianapolis, Sharp set a new American record in the 200 meter backstroke with a time of 1:58.66, placing first in the event, and breaking the eight year old former record of three-time U.S. Olympian Rick Carey.

== 1992 Barcelona Olympics ==
At the 1992 Barcelona Olympics, Sharp was managed and trained by Hall of Fame Coach Eddie Reese, best known for coaching the University of Texas. Reese had earlier attempted to recruit Sharp to swim for Texas, but without success. Sharp competed in the preliminary heats of the men's 200-meter backstroke, and finished with a time of 2:00.97, placing eighteenth overall . His winning time in the U.S. Olympic Trials of 1:58.66 was over two seconds faster, and the equivalent time would have won a medal in Barcelona, as it was under the finishing time of the silver medalist Vladamir Selkov of the European Union who swam a 1:58.87 and bronze medalist, Italy's Stefano Battistelli who swam a 1:59.40. Martin Lopez-Zubero of Spain took the gold medal with a time of 1:58.47, and as noted Vladamir Selkov took the silver with a time of 1:58.87, and Stefano Battistelli took the bronze with a time of 1:59.40. Sharp later noted that he had gone under the 2 minute barrier many times in practice but was feeling sluggish in his morning preliminary heat, and often performed better in qualifying heats later in the day.

== International competition highlights ==
As noted in the Medal record pull-down at right, in international competition, at the 1993 Pan Pacific Championships in Kobe, Japan he placed first taking the gold medal in the 200 back, and at the 1994 World Championships in Rome, Italy, won the third-place 200-meter backstroke bronze medal.

== University of Michigan ==
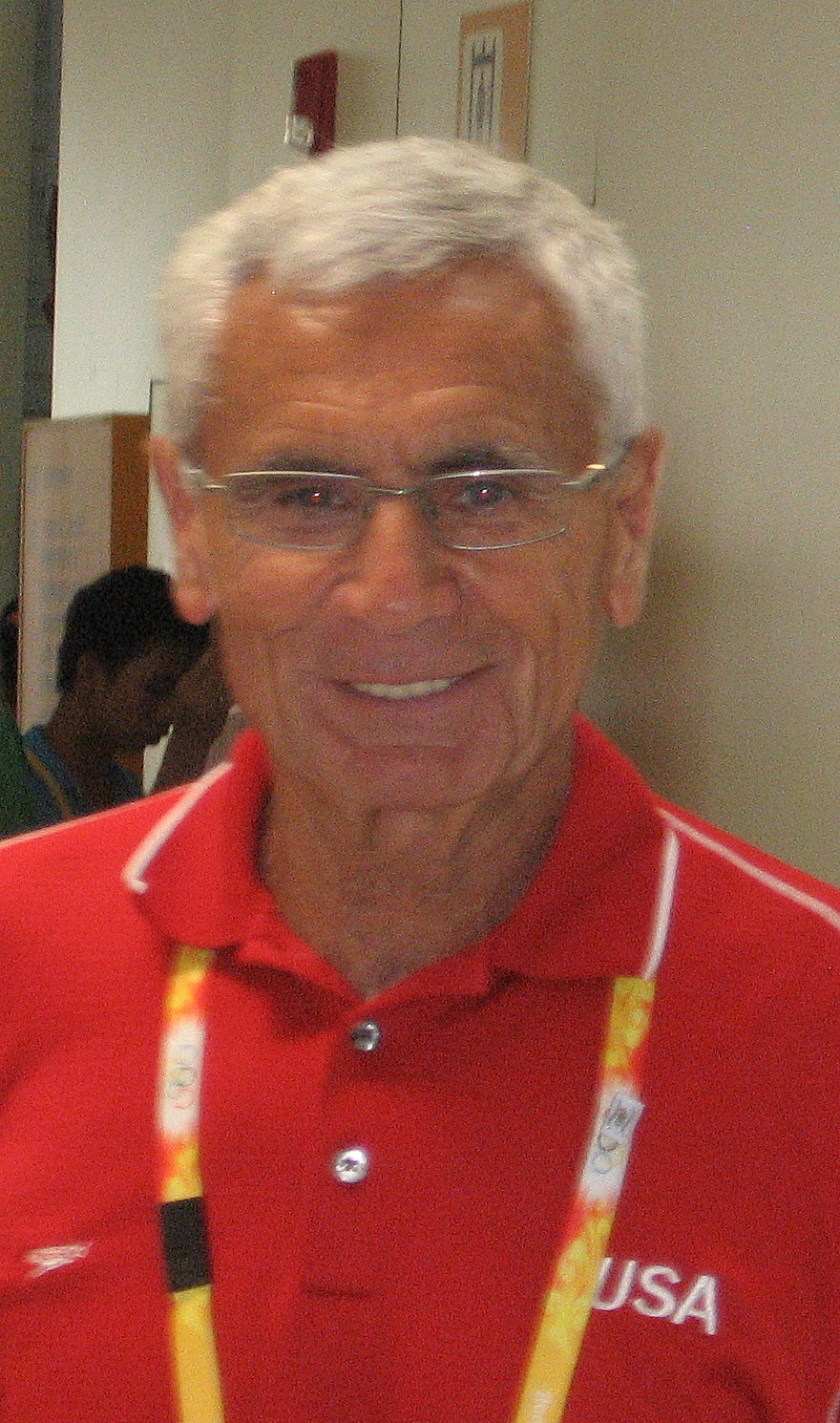
Coach Urbanchek

Sharp attended the University of Michigan, under Head Coach Jon Urbanchek, where he continued to specialize in backstroke, swimming on the team from around 1991-1995. In his Freshman year at Michigan, he was voted the Big Ten Conference Freshman of the Year. In his best publicized collegiate experience, he was part of the Michigan swim team that won the 1995 NCAA Championship. Sharp again broke the American record in the 200-meter backstroke on December 2, 1993 with a time of 1:56.63 at the United States Open Swimming Championships. While at Michigan, Sharp won the 200-meter backstroke at the 1993 U.S. Swimming National Championships with a time of 2:00.80, though he would soon improve on his time.

After graduating Michigan with a Bachelors in Science and General Studies, Sharp left swimming competition.

== Honors ==
Royce was made a member of the Peddie School Sports Hall of Fame in 1991. He was voted the Big Ten Conference's 1993 Freshman of the Year while at the University of Michigan.

== Careers ==
Sharp later worked as a securities and fixed-income trader in greater Houston and Austin, Texas holding a brokers license as James Royce Sharp Jr. He worked for Santander Markets, LLC, and Amherst Securities in Austin, and Piper, Sandler and Co. on Bee Cave Road in Austin Texas. Working for Piper, Sandler, and Co., he has held the role of Director for Fixed Income Trading for the Financial Services Group, where he worked in mortgage securities and securities that are asset-backed. He worked for Amherst Pierpont Securities for 20 years prior to starting with Piper, Sandler.

In community service positions, in May, 2016, Royce ran for the Director of the Montgomery County (Texas) Municipal Utilities District No. 9, around Conroe, Texas, North of Houston, receiving 23.1 percent of the vote, not enough to take office.

== See also ==
- List of University of Michigan alumni
- List of World Aquatics Championships medalists in swimming (men)
