= Roman Shchegolev =

Russian swimmer

Sport
- Sport: Swimming
Medal record
Representing Russia
World Championships
Silver medal – second place	1994 Rome	4×100 m freestyle
Silver medal – second place	1994 Rome	4×200 m freestyle
European Championships
Gold medal – first place	1995 Vienna	4×100 m freestyle

Roman Shchegolev (also Tchegolev or Shegolev, Russian: Роман Щеголев) is a Russian swimmer who won a gold medal at the 1995 European Aquatics Championships and two silver medals at the 1994 World Aquatics Championships, all in freestyle relays.

In 1995, he won national titles in the individual 200 m medley and 200 m freestyle events.
