= 1994 World Aquatics Championships =

Aquatic sports competition

7th FINA World Championships
- Host city: Rome, Italy
- Date: September 1–11, 1994

The 1994 FINA World Aquatics Championships were held in Rome, Italy between September 1 and September 11, 1994.

== Medal table ==
* Host nation (Italy)

Rank	Nation	Gold	Silver	Bronze	Total
1	China (CHN)	16	10	2	28
2	United States (USA)	7	10	8	25
3	Russia (RUS)	5	7	5	17
4	Australia (AUS)	5	3	4	12
5	Hungary (HUN)	3	3	4	10
6	Finland (FIN)	2	2	0	4
7	Spain (ESP)	1	2	0	3
7	Sweden (SWE)	1	2	0	3
9	Germany (GER)	1	1	6	8
10	Canada (CAN)	1	1	3	5
11	Italy (ITA)*	1	0	2	3
12	Poland (POL)	1	0	0	1
12	Zimbabwe (ZIM)	1	0	0	1
14	Japan (JPN)	0	2	1	3
15	New Zealand (NZL)	0	1	2	3
16	Netherlands (NED)	0	1	0	1
17	Belgium (BEL)	0	0	2	2
17	Brazil (BRA)	0	0	2	2
17	Costa Rica (CRC)	0	0	2	2
20	Lithuania (LTU)	0	0	1	1
20	Mexico (MEX)	0	0	1	1
Totals (21 entries)		45	45	45	135

== Results ==
=== Diving ===
Men

Event	Gold	Silver	Bronze
1 m springboard	Evan Stewart (ZIM)	Lan Wei (CHN)	Brian Earley (USA)
3 m springboard	Yu Zhuocheng (CHN)	Dmitri Sautin (RUS)	Wang Tianling (CHN)
10 m platform	Dmitri Sautin (RUS)	Sun Shuwei (CHN)	Vladimir Timoshinin (RUS)

Women

Event	Gold	Silver	Bronze
1 m springboard	Chen Lixia (CHN)	Tan Shuping (CHN)	Annie Pelletier (CAN)
3 m springboard	Tan Shuping (CHN)	Vera Ilyina (RUS)	Claudia Böckner (GER)
10 m platform	Fu Mingxia (CHN)	Chi Bin (CHN)	María José Alcalá (MEX)

=== Open water swimming ===
Men

Event	Gold	Silver	Bronze
25 km	Greg Streppel (CAN)	David Bates (AUS)	Aleksey Akatyev (RUS)

Women

Event	Gold	Silver	Bronze
25 km	Melissa Cunningham (AUS)	Rita Kovács (HUN)	Shelley Taylor-Smith (AUS)

=== Swimming ===
Men

Event	Gold	Silver	Bronze
50 m freestyle	Alexander Popov (RUS)	Gary Hall Jr. (USA)	Raimundas Mažuolis (LTU)
100 m freestyle	Alexander Popov (RUS)	Gary Hall Jr. (USA)	Gustavo Borges (BRA)
200 m freestyle	Antti Kasvio (FIN)	Anders Holmertz (SWE)	Danyon Loader (NZL)
400 m freestyle	Kieren Perkins (AUS)	Antti Kasvio (FIN)	Danyon Loader (NZL)
1500 m freestyle	Kieren Perkins (AUS)	Daniel Kowalski (AUS)	Steffen Zesner (GER)
100 m backstroke	Martin López (ESP)	Jeff Rouse (USA)	Tamás Deutsch (HUN)
200 m backstroke	Vladimir Selkov (RUS)	Martin López (ESP)	Royce Sharp (USA)
100 m breaststroke	Norbert Rózsa (HUN)	Károly Güttler (HUN)	Frédérik Deburghgraeve (BEL)
200 m breaststroke	Norbert Rózsa (HUN)	Eric Wunderlich (USA)	Károly Güttler (HUN)
100 m butterfly	Rafał Szukała (POL)	Lars Frölander (SWE)	Denis Pankratov (RUS)
200 m butterfly	Denis Pankratov (RUS)	Danyon Loader (NZL)	Chris-Carol Bremer (GER)
200 m individual medley	Jani Sievinen (FIN)	Greg Burgess (USA)	Attila Czene (HUN)
400 m individual medley	Tom Dolan (USA)	Jani Sievinen (FIN)	Eric Namesnik (USA)
4 × 100 m freestyle relay	United States (USA); Jon Olsen; Josh Davis; Uğur Taner; Gary Hall Jr.	Russia (RUS); Roman Shegolev; Vladimir Predkin; Vladimir Pyshnenko; Alexander Popov	Brazil (BRA); Fernando Scherer; Teófilo Ferreira; André Teixeira; Gustavo Borges
4 × 200 m freestyle relay	Sweden (SWE); Christer Wallin; Tommy Werner; Lars Frölander; Anders Holmertz	Russia (RUS); Yury Mukhin; Roman Shegolev; Vladimir Pyshnenko; Denis Pankratov	Germany (GER); Andreas Szigat; Christian Keller; Oliver Lampe; Steffen Zesner
4 × 100 m medley relay	United States (USA); Jeff Rouse; Eric Wunderlich; Mark Henderson; Gary Hall Jr.	Russia (RUS); Vladimir Selkov; Vasili Ivanov; Denis Pankratov; Alexander Popov	Hungary (HUN); Tamás Deutsch; Norbert Rózsa; Péter Horváth; Attila Czene

Women

Event	Gold	Silver	Bronze
50 m freestyle	Le Jingyi (CHN)	Natalya Meshcheryakova (RUS)	Amy Van Dyken (USA)
100 m freestyle	Le Jingyi (CHN)	Lü Bin (CHN)	Franziska van Almsick (GER)
200 m freestyle	Franziska van Almsick (GER)	Lü Bin (CHN)	Claudia Poll (CRC)
400 m freestyle	Yang Aihua (CHN)	Cristina Teuscher (USA)	Claudia Poll (CRC)
800 m freestyle	Janet Evans (USA)	Hayley Lewis (AUS)	Brooke Bennett (USA)
100 m backstroke	He Cihong (CHN)	Nina Zhivanevskaya (RUS)	Barbara Bedford (USA)
200 m backstroke	He Cihong (CHN)	Krisztina Egerszegi (HUN)	Lorenza Vigarani (ITA)
100 m breaststroke	Samantha Riley (AUS)	Dai Guohong (CHN)	Yuan Yuan (CHN)
200 m breaststroke	Samantha Riley (AUS)	Yuan Yuan (CHN)	Brigitte Becue (BEL)
100 m butterfly	Liu Limin (CHN)	Yun Qu (CHN)	Susan O'Neill (AUS)
200 m butterfly	Liu Limin (CHN)	Yun Qu (CHN)	Susan O'Neill (AUS)
200 m individual medley	Lü Bin (CHN)	Allison Wagner (USA)	Elli Overton (AUS)
400 m individual medley	Dai Guohong (CHN)	Allison Wagner (USA)	Kristine Quance (USA)
4 × 100 m freestyle relay	China (CHN); Le Ying; Shan Ying; Lü Bin; Le Jingyi	United States (USA); Angel Martino; Nicole Haislett; Amy Van Dyken; Jenny Thompson	Germany (GER); Franziska van Almsick; Katrin Meissner; Kerstin Kielgass; Daniela Hunger
4 × 200 m freestyle relay	China (CHN); Le Ying; Yang Aihua; Lü Bin; Zhou Guanbin	Germany (GER); Franziska van Almsick; Julia Jung; Kerstin Kielgass; Dagmar Hase	United States (USA); Cristina Teuscher; Nicole Haislett; Janet Evans; Jenny Thompson
4 × 100 m medley relay	China (CHN); He Cihong; Dai Guohong; Liu Limin; Le Jingyi	United States (USA); Lea Loveless; Kristine Quance; Amy Van Dyken; Jenny Thompson	Russia (RUS); Nina Zhivanevskaya; Olga Prokhorova; Svetlana Pozdeeva; Natalya Meshcheryakova

=== Synchronized swimming ===
Event	Gold	Silver	Bronze
Solo routine	Becky Dyroen-Lancer (USA)	Fumiko Okuno (JPN)	Lisa Alexander (CAN)
Duet routine	Becky Dyroen-Lancer (USA); Jill Suduth (USA)	Fumiko Okuno (JPN); Miya Tachibana (JPN)	Lisa Alexander (CAN); Erin Woodley (CAN)
Team routine	United States (USA)	Canada (CAN)	Japan (JPN)

=== Water polo ===
Men

Event	Gold	Silver	Bronze
Team	Italy	Spain	Russia

Women

Event	Gold	Silver	Bronze
Team	Hungary	Netherlands	Italy
