= Olga Prokhorova =

Russian swimmer

Personal information
- Born: 19 March 1979 (age 47) Moscow, Soviet Union
Medal record
Women's swimming
Representing Russia
World Championships
Bronze medal – third place	1994 Rome	4×100 m medley

Olga Prokhorova (Russian: Ольга Прохорова; born 19 March 1979 in Moscow) is a Russian retired swimmer. She won a bronze medal at the 1994 World Aquatics Championships.
