= Julia Jung =

German swimmer

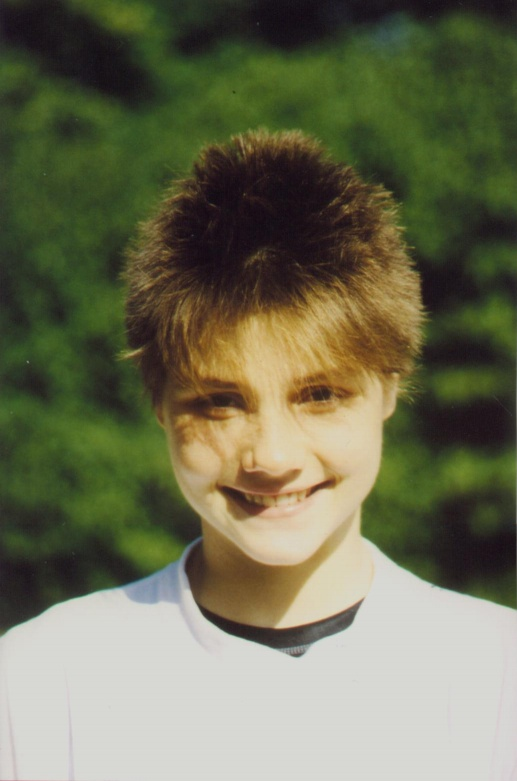

Personal information
- Born: 4 October 1979 (age 46) Haiger, West Germany
- Height: 1.67 m (5 ft 6 in)

Sport
- Sport: Swimming
- Club: TV Dillenburg
Medal record
Women's swimming
Representing Germany
World Championships (LC)
Silver medal – second place	1994 Rome	4×200 m freestyle
World Championships (SC)
Silver medal – second place	1995 Rio de Janeiro	4×200 m freestyle
European Championships (LC)
Gold medal – first place	1995 Vienna	800 m freestyle
Gold medal – first place	1995 Vienna	4×200 m freestyle

Julia Jung (born 4 October 1979) is a retired German swimmer who won one gold and two silver medals in the 4×200 m freestyle relay at the European and world championships in 1994 and 1995. In 1995, she also won a national title and a European gold medal in the 800 m freestyle.

In 1993 and 1994 she won six junior European championship titles, becoming one of the most successful junior European swimmers of all time. She was chosen the German Junior Sportswoman of the Year 1994.

She retired soon after missing the qualification for the 1996 Olympics due to a spine problem; she then completed her sports studies and worked as a swimming instructor.
