= Natalya Meshcheryakova =

Russian swimmer (born 1972)

Medal record

Women's swimming

Representing the Unified Team

Olympic Games
Bronze medal – third place	1992 Barcelona	4x100 m medley relay

Representing Russia

World Championships (LC)
Silver medal – second place	1994 Rome	50 m freestyle
Bronze medal – third place	1994 Rome	4x100 m medley

European Championships (LC)
Gold medal – first place	1997 Seville	50 m freestyle
Silver medal – second place	1993 Sheffield	4x100 m medley
Silver medal – second place	1997 Seville	4x100 m medley
Bronze medal – third place	1993 Sheffield	4x100 m freestyle
Bronze medal – third place	1997 Seville	4x100 m freestyle

Natalya Meshcheryakova (Russian: Наталья Мещерякова); born 1 June 1972, is a former freestyle swimmer from Russia.

She competed at the 1992 Summer Olympic Games & the 1996 Summer Olympic Games, finishing sixth in the final of the 50 metres freestyle in a time of 25.47 seconds in 1992. Meshcheryakova competed for the Unified team in 1992, & for Russia in 1996.

Her best result at the Olympics was a bronze medal in 1992 whilst swimming the anchor leg for the Unified teams 4 x 100 metre medley relay.
