= Yang Aihua =

Chinese swimmer (born 1977)

Personal information
- Nationality: China
- Born: 1977 (age 48–49)

Sport
- Sport: Swimming
- Strokes: Freestyle
Medal record
Women's swimming
Representing China
World Championships (LC)
Gold medal – first place	1994 Rome	400 m freestyle
Gold medal – first place	1994 Rome	4×200 m freestyle

Yang Aihua (born 1977) is a former swimmer from China who won the gold medal in the 400 meters freestyle at the 1994 World Aquatics Championships in Rome.

== Biography ==
In November 1994, Yang was suspended for two years after testing positive for testosterone before the 1994 Asian Games in Hiroshima, Japan.
