= Yuan Yuan (swimmer) =

Chinese swimmer (born 1976)

Personal information
- Born: January 11, 1976 (age 50)

Sport
- Sport: Swimming
Medal record
Representing China
World Championships (LC)
Silver medal – second place	1994 Rome	200m breaststroke
Bronze medal – third place	1994 Rome	100m breaststroke
Asian Games
Gold medal – first place	1994 Hiroshima	200m breaststroke

Yuan Yuan (Chinese: 原媛; born 11 January 1976) is a Chinese former swimmer who competed in the 1996 Summer Olympics.

During a routine customs check while travelling to the 1998 World Aquatics Championships in Perth, Australia, human growth hormone was found in her luggage, in sufficient quantities to supply the entire Chinese women's swimming team for the duration of the championships. Only Yuan was sanctioned for the incident, with speculation that this was connected to the nomination of Juan Antonio Samaranch by China for the Nobel Peace Prize in 1993.
