= List of World Swimming Championships (25 m) medalists (women) =

This is a complete list of women's World Championships medalists in short-course swimming from 1993 to 2024.

== 50 metre freestyle ==
Year	Gold	Silver	Bronze
1993 Palma de Mallorca	Le Jingyi (CHN)	Angel Martino (USA)	Linda Olofsson (SWE)
1995 Rio de Janeiro	Le Jingyi (CHN)	Angela Postma (NED)	Sandra Völker (GER)
1997 Gothenburg	Sandra Völker (GER)	Jenny Thompson (USA)	Le Jingyi (CHN)
1999 Hong Kong	Inge de Bruijn (NED)	Jenny Thompson (USA)	Alison Sheppard (GBR)
2000 Athens	Therese Alshammar (SWE)	Sandra Völker (GER)	Alison Sheppard (GBR)
2002 Moscow	Therese Alshammar (SWE)	Alison Sheppard (GBR)	Tammie Stone (USA)
2004 Indianapolis	Marleen Veldhuis (NED)	Lisbeth Lenton (AUS)	Therese Alshammar (SWE)
2006 Shanghai	Lisbeth Lenton (AUS)	Therese Alshammar (SWE)	Marleen Veldhuis (NED)
2008 Manchester	Marleen Veldhuis (NED)	Hinkelien Schreuder (NED)	Francesca Halsall (GBR)
2010 Dubai	Ranomi Kromowidjojo (NED)	Hinkelien Schreuder (NED)	Arianna Vanderpool-Wallace (BAH)
2012 Istanbul	Aleksandra Gerasimenya (BLR)	Francesca Halsall (GBR)	Jeanette Ottesen (DEN)
2014 Doha	Ranomi Kromowidjojo (NED)	Bronte Campbell (AUS)	Dorothea Brandt (GER)
2016 Windsor	Ranomi Kromowidjojo (NED)	Silvia Di Pietro (ITA)	Madison Kennedy (USA)
2018 Hangzhou	Ranomi Kromowidjojo (NED)	Femke Heemskerk (NED)	Etiene Medeiros (BRA)
2021 Abu Dhabi	Sarah Sjöström (SWE)	Ranomi Kromowidjojo (NED)	Katarzyna Wasick (POL)
2022 Melbourne	Emma McKeon (AUS)	Katarzyna Wasick (POL)	Anna Hopkin (GBR)
2024 Budapest	Gretchen Walsh (USA)	Kate Douglass (USA)	Katarzyna Wasick (POL)

Rank	Nation	Gold	Silver	Bronze	Total
1	Netherlands	7	5	1	13
2	Sweden	3	1	2	6
3	Australia	2	2		4
4	China	2		1	3
5	United States	1	4	2	7
6	Germany	1	1	2	4
7	Belarus	1			1
8	Great Britain		2	4	6
9	Poland		1	2	3
10	Italy		1		1
11	Bahamas			1	1
11	Brazil			1	1
11	Denmark			1	1
Total		17	17	17	51

== 100 metre freestyle ==
Year	Gold	Silver	Bronze
1993 Palma de Mallorca	Le Jingyi (CHN)	Angel Martino (USA)	Karen Pickering (GBR)
1995 Rio de Janeiro	Le Jingyi (CHN)	Chao Na (CHN)	Sandra Völker (GER)
1997 Gothenburg	Jenny Thompson (USA)	Sandra Völker (GER)	Le Jingyi (CHN)
1999 Hong Kong	Jenny Thompson (USA)	Sandra Völker (GER)	Sue Rolph (GBR)
2000 Athens	Therese Alshammar (SWE)	Jenny Thompson (USA)	Martina Moravcová (SVK)
2002 Moscow	Therese Alshammar (SWE)	Martina Moravcová (SVK)	Xu Yanwei (CHN)
2004 Indianapolis	Lisbeth Lenton (AUS)	Josefin Lillhage (SWE)	Marleen Veldhuis (NED)
2006 Shanghai	Lisbeth Lenton (AUS)	Marleen Veldhuis (NED)	Maritza Correia (USA)
2008 Manchester	Marleen Veldhuis (NED)	Francesca Halsall (GBR)	Hanna-Maria Seppälä (FIN)
2010 Dubai	Ranomi Kromowidjojo (NED)	Femke Heemskerk (NED)	Natalie Coughlin (USA)
2012 Istanbul	Britta Steffen (GER)	Megan Romano (USA)	Tang Yi (CHN)
2014 Doha	Femke Heemskerk (NED)	Sarah Sjöström (SWE)	Ranomi Kromowidjojo (NED)
2016 Windsor	Brittany Elmslie (AUS)	Ranomi Kromowidjojo (NED)	Penny Oleksiak (CAN)
2018 Hangzhou	Ranomi Kromowidjojo (NED)	Femke Heemskerk (NED)	Mallory Comerford (USA)
2021 Abu Dhabi	Siobhán Haughey (HKG)	Sarah Sjöström (SWE)	Abbey Weitzeil (USA)
2022 Melbourne	Emma McKeon (AUS)	Siobhán Haughey (HKG)	Marrit Steenbergen (NED)
2024 Budapest	Gretchen Walsh (USA)	Béryl Gastaldello (FRA)	Kate Douglass (USA)

Rank	Nation	Gold	Silver	Bronze	Total
1	Netherlands	4	4	3	11
2	Australia	4			4
3	United States	3	3	5	11
4	Sweden	2	3		5
5	China	2	1	3	6
6	Germany	1	2	1	4
7	Hong Kong	1	1		2
8	Great Britain		1	2	3
9	Slovakia		1	1	2
10	France		1		1
11	Canada			1	1
11	Finland			1	1
Total		17	17	17	51

== 200 metre freestyle ==
Year	Gold	Silver	Bronze
1993 Palma de Mallorca	Karen Pickering (GBR)	Susie O'Neill (AUS)	Lü Bin (CHN)
1995 Rio de Janeiro	Claudia Poll (CRC)	Susie O'Neill (AUS)	Martina Moravcová (SVK)
1997 Gothenburg	Claudia Poll (CRC)	Yin Nian (CHN)	Martina Moravcová (SVK)
1999 Hong Kong	Martina Moravcová (SVK)	Qin Caini (USA)	Josefin Lillhage (SWE)
2000 Athens	Yang Yu (CHN)	Martina Moravcová (SVK)	Natalya Baranovskaya (BLR)
2002 Moscow	Lindsay Benko (USA)	Yang Yu (CHN)	Xu Yanwei (CHN)
2004 Indianapolis	Josefin Lillhage (SWE)	Lindsay Benko (USA)	Dana Vollmer (USA)
2006 Shanghai	Yang Yu (CHN)	Federica Pellegrini (ITA)	Annika Liebs (GER)
2008 Manchester	Kylie Palmer (AUS)	Femke Heemskerk (NED)	Caitlin McClatchey (GBR)
2010 Dubai	Camille Muffat (FRA)	Katie Hoff (USA)	Kylie Palmer (AUS)
2012 Istanbul	Allison Schmitt (USA)	Katinka Hosszú (HUN)	Melanie Costa (ESP)
2014 Doha	Sarah Sjöström (SWE)	Katinka Hosszú (HUN)	Femke Heemskerk (NED)
2016 Windsor	Federica Pellegrini (ITA)	Katinka Hosszú (HUN)	Taylor Ruck (CAN)
2018 Hangzhou	Ariarne Titmus (AUS)	Mallory Comerford (USA)	Femke Heemskerk (NED)
2021 Abu Dhabi	Siobhán Haughey (HKG)	Rebecca Smith (CAN)	Paige Madden (USA)
2022 Melbourne	Siobhán Haughey (HKG)	Rebecca Smith (CAN)	Marrit Steenbergen (NED)
2024 Budapest	Siobhán Haughey (HKG)	Mary-Sophie Harvey (CAN)	Claire Weinstein (USA)

Rank	Nation	Gold	Silver	Bronze	Total
1	Hong Kong	3			3
2	United States	2	4	3	9
3	China	2	2	2	6
4	Australia	2	2	1	5
5	Sweden	2		1	3
6	Costa Rica	2			2
7	Slovakia	1	1	2	4
8	Italy	1	1		2
9	Great Britain	1		1	2
10	France	1			1
11	Canada		3	1	4
12	Hungary		3		3
13	Netherlands		1	3	4
14	Belarus			1	1
14	Germany			1	1
14	Spain			1	1
Total		17	17	17	51

== 400 metre freestyle ==
Year	Gold	Silver	Bronze
1993 Palma de Mallorca	Janet Evans (USA)	Trina Jackson (USA)	Julie Majer (AUS)
1995 Rio de Janeiro	Claudia Poll (CRC)	Carla Geurts (NED)	Sarah Hardcastle (GBR)
1997 Gothenburg	Claudia Poll (CRC)	Natasha Bowron (AUS)	Kerstin Kielgass (GER)
1999 Hong Kong	Nadezhda Chemezova (RUS)	Qin Caini (CHN)	Joanne Malar (CAN)
2000 Athens	Lindsay Benko (USA)	Yana Klochkova (UKR)	Chen Hua (CHN)
2002 Moscow	Yana Klochkova (UKR)	Chen Hua (CHN)	Rachel Komisarz (USA)
2004 Indianapolis	Kaitlin Sandeno (USA)	Sara McLarty (USA)	Sachiko Yamada (JPN)
2006 Shanghai	Kate Ziegler (USA)	Bronte Barratt (AUS)	Federica Pellegrini (ITA)
2008 Manchester	Kylie Palmer (AUS)	Camelia Potec (ROM)	Joanne Jackson (GBR)
2010 Dubai	Katie Hoff (USA)	Kylie Palmer (AUS)	Federica Pellegrini (ITA)
2012 Istanbul	Melanie Costa (ESP)	Chloe Sutton (USA)	Lauren Boyle (NZL)
2014 Doha	Mireia Belmonte (ESP)	Sharon van Rouwendaal (NED)	Zhang Yufei (CHN)
2016 Windsor	Leah Smith (USA)	Veronika Popova (RUS)	Chihiro Igarashi (JPN)
2018 Hangzhou	Ariarne Titmus (AUS)	Wang Jianjiahe (CHN)	Li Bingjie (CHN)
2021 Abu Dhabi	Li Bingjie (CHN)	Summer McIntosh (CAN)	Siobhán Haughey (HKG)
2022 Melbourne	Lani Pallister (AUS)	Erika Fairweather (NZL)	Leah Smith (USA)
2024 Budapest	Summer McIntosh (CAN)	Lani Pallister (AUS)	Mary-Sophie Harvey (CAN)

Rank	Nation	Gold	Silver	Bronze	Total
1	United States	6	3	2	11
2	Australia	3	4	1	8
3	Costa Rica	2			2
3	Spain	2			2
5	China	1	3	3	7
6	Canada	1	1	2	4
7	Russia	1	1		2
7	Ukraine	1	1		2
9	Netherlands		2		2
10	New Zealand		1	1	2
11	Romania		1		1
12	Italy			2	2
12	Japan			2	2
12	Great Britain			2	2
15	Germany			1	1
15	Hong Kong			1	1
Total		17	17	17	51

== 800 metre freestyle ==
Year	Gold	Silver	Bronze
1993 Palma de Mallorca	Janet Evans (USA)	Julie Majer (AUS)	Trina Jackson (USA)
1995 Rio de Janeiro	Sarah Hardcastle (GBR)	Carla Geurts (NED)	Liu Ping (CHN)
1997 Gothenburg	Natasha Bowron (AUS)	Kerstin Kielgass (GER)	Carla Geurts (NED)
1999 Hong Kong	Chen Hua (CHN)	Rachel Harris (AUS)	Flavia Rigamonti (SUI)
2000 Athens	Chen Hua (CHN)	Brooke Bennett (USA)	Flavia Rigamonti (SUI)
2002 Moscow	Chen Hua (CHN)	Irina Ufimtseva (RUS)	Flavia Rigamonti (SUI)
2004 Indianapolis	Sachiko Yamada (JPN)	Kate Ziegler (USA)	Melissa Gorman (AUS)
2006 Shanghai	Anastasiya Ivanenko (RUS)	Kate Ziegler (USA)	Rebecca Cooke (GBR)
2008 Manchester	Rebecca Adlington (GBR)	Kylie Palmer (AUS)	Erika Villaecija (ESP)
2010 Dubai	Erika Villaecija (ESP)	Mireia Belmonte (ESP)	Kate Ziegler (USA)
2012 Istanbul	Lauren Boyle (NZL)	Lotte Friis (DEN)	Chloe Sutton (USA)
2014 Doha	Mireia Belmonte (ESP)	Jazmin Carlin (GBR)	Sharon van Rouwendaal (NED)
2016 Windsor	Leah Smith (USA)	Ashley Twichell (USA)	Kiah Melverton (AUS)
2018 Hangzhou	Wang Jianjiahe (CHN)	Simona Quadarella (ITA)	Leah Smith (USA)
2021 Abu Dhabi	Li Bingjie (CHN)	Anastasiya Kirpichnikova (RSF)	Simona Quadarella (ITA)
2022 Melbourne	Lani Pallister (AUS)	Erika Fairweather (NZL)	Miyu Namba (JPN)
2024 Budapest	Lani Pallister (AUS)	Isabel Gose (GER)	Katie Grimes (USA)

Rank	Nation	Gold	Silver	Bronze	Total
1	China	5		1	6
2	Australia	3	3	2	8
3	United States	2	4	5	11
4	Spain	2	1	1	4
4	Great Britain	2	1	1	4
6	New Zealand	1	1		2
6	Russia	1	1		2
8	Japan	1		1	2
9	Germany		2		2
10	Netherlands		1	2	3
11	Italy		1	1	2
12	Denmark		1		1
12	RSF		1		1
14	Switzerland			3	3
Total		17	17	17	51

== 1500 metre freestyle ==
Year	Gold	Silver	Bronze
2022 Melbourne	Lani Pallister (AUS)	Miyu Namba (JPN)	Kensey McMahon (USA)
2024 Budapest	Isabel Gose (GER)	Simona Quadarella (ITA)	Jillian Cox (USA)

Rank	Nation	Gold	Silver	Bronze	Total
1	Australia	1			1
1	Germany	1			1
3	Japan		1		1
3	Italy		1		1
5	United States			2	2
Total		2	2	2	6

== 50 metre backstroke ==
Year	Gold	Silver	Bronze
1999 Hong Kong	Sandra Völker (GER)	Mai Nakamura (JPN)	Kellie McMillan (AUS)
2000 Athens	Antje Buschschulte (GER)	Marylyn Chiang (CAN)	Kellie McMillan (AUS)
2002 Moscow	Jennifer Carroll (CAN)	Haley Cope (USA)	Diana MacManus (USA)
2004 Indianapolis	Haley Cope (USA)	Gao Chang (CHN)	Sophie Edington (AUS)
2006 Shanghai	Janine Pietsch (GER)	Tayliah Zimmer (AUS)	Gao Chang (CHN)
2008 Manchester	Sanja Jovanović (CRO)	Gao Chang (CHN)	Kateryna Zubkova (UKR)
2010 Dubai	Zhao Jing (CHN)	Rachel Goh (AUS)	Mercedes Peris (ESP)
2012 Istanbul	Zhao Jing (CHN)	Olivia Smoliga (USA)	Aleksandra Urbanczyk (POL)
2014 Doha	Etiene Medeiros (BRA)	Emily Seebohm (AUS)	Katinka Hosszú (HUN)
2016 Windsor	Etiene Medeiros (BRA)	Katinka Hosszú (HUN)	Ali DeLoof (USA)
2018 Hangzhou	Olivia Smoliga (USA)	Caroline Pilhatsch (AUT)	Holly Barratt (AUS)
2021 Abu Dhabi	Maggie Mac Neil (CAN)	Kylie Masse (CAN)	Louise Hansson (SWE)
2022 Melbourne	Maggie Mac Neil (CAN)	Claire Curzan (USA)	Mollie O'Callaghan (AUS)
2024 Budapest	Regan Smith (USA)	Katharine Berkoff (USA)	Kylie Masse (CAN)

Rank	Nation	Gold	Silver	Bronze	Total
1	United States	3	4	2	9
2	Canada	3	2	1	6
3	Germany	3			3
4	China	2	2	1	5
5	Brazil	2			2
6	Croatia	1			1
7	Australia		3	5	8
8	Hungary		1	1	2
9	Austria		1		1
9	Japan		1		1
11	Poland			1	1
11	Spain			1	1
11	Sweden			1	1
11	Ukraine			1	1
Total		14	14	14	42

== 100 metre backstroke ==
Year	Gold	Silver	Bronze
1993 Palma de Mallorca	Angel Martino (USA)	He Cihong (CHN)	Elli Overton (AUS)
1995 Rio de Janeiro	Misty Hyman (USA)	Mette Jacobsen (DEN)	Barbara Bedford (USA)
1997 Gothenburg	Lu Donghua (CHN)	Chen Yan (CHN)	Misty Hyman (USA)
1999 Hong Kong	Mai Nakamura (JPN)	Kelly Stefanyshyn (CAN)	Erin Gammel (CAN)
2000 Athens	Sandra Völker (GER)	Marylyn Chiang (CAN)	Antje Buschschulte (GER)
2002 Moscow	Haley Cope (USA)	Ilona Hlaváčková (CZE)	Diana MacManus (USA)
2004 Indianapolis	Haley Cope (USA)	Gao Chang (CHN)	Sophie Edington (AUS)
2006 Shanghai	Janine Pietsch (GER)	Tayliah Zimmer (AUS)	Gao Chang (CHN)
2008 Manchester	Kirsty Coventry (ZIM)	Kateryna Zubkova (UKR)	Sanja Jovanović (CRO)
2010 Dubai	Natalie Coughlin (USA)	Zhao Jing (CHN)	Gao Chang (CHN)
2012 Istanbul	Olivia Smoliga (USA)	Mie Nielsen (DEN)	Simona Baumrtová (CZE)
2014 Doha	Katinka Hosszú (HUN)	Emily Seebohm (AUS)	Daryna Zevina (UKR)
2016 Windsor	Katinka Hosszú (HUN)	Kylie Masse (CAN)	Georgia Davies (GBR)
2018 Hangzhou	Olivia Smoliga (USA)	Katinka Hosszú (HUN)	Georgia Davies (GBR)
2018 Hangzhou	Olivia Smoliga (USA)	Katinka Hosszú (HUN)	Minna Atherton (AUS)
2021 Abu Dhabi	Louise Hansson (SWE)	Kylie Masse (CAN)	Katharine Berkoff (USA)
2022 Melbourne	Kaylee McKeown (AUS)	Mollie O'Callaghan (AUS)	Claire Curzan (USA) Ingrid Wilm (CAN)
2024 Budapest	Regan Smith (USA)	Katharine Berkoff (USA)	Ingrid Wilm (CAN)

Rank	Nation	Gold	Silver	Bronze	Total
1	United States	8	1	5	14
2	Hungary	2	1		3
3	Germany	2		1	3
4	China	1	4	2	7
5	Australia	1	3	3	7
6	Japan	1			1
6	Sweden	1			1
6	Zimbabwe	1			1
9	Canada		4	3	7
10	Denmark		2		2
11	Czech Republic		1	1	2
11	Ukraine		1	1	2
13	Great Britain			2	2
14	Croatia			1	1
Total		17	17	19	53

== 200 metre backstroke ==
Year	Gold	Silver	Bronze
1993 Palma de Mallorca	He Cihong (CHN)	Jia Yuanyuan (CHN)	Cathleen Rund (GER)
1995 Rio de Janeiro	Mette Jacobsen (DEN)	Dagmar Hase (GER)	Leigh Habier (AUS)
1997 Gothenburg	Chen Yan (CHN)	Misty Hyman (USA)	Lia Oberstar (USA)
1999 Hong Kong	Mai Nakamura (JPN)	Helen Don-Duncan (GBR)	Kelly Stefanyshyn (CAN)
2000 Athens	Antje Buschschulte (GER)	Clementine Stoney (AUS)	Lindsay Benko (USA)
2002 Moscow	Lindsay Benko (USA)	Reiko Nakamura (JPN)	Irina Amshennikova (UKR)
2004 Indianapolis	Margaret Hoelzer (USA)	Tayliah Zimmer (AUS)	Melissa Ingram (NZL)
2006 Shanghai	Margaret Hoelzer (USA)	Tayliah Zimmer (AUS)	Hannah McLean (NZL)
2008 Manchester	Kirsty Coventry (ZIM)	Elizabeth Simmonds (GBR)	Margaret Hoelzer (USA)
2010 Dubai	Alexianne Castel (FRA)	Missy Franklin (USA)	Zhou Yanxin (CHN)
2012 Istanbul	Daryna Zevina (UKR)	Bonnie Brandon (USA)	Duane Da Rocha (ESP)
2014 Doha	Katinka Hosszú (HUN)	Emily Seebohm (AUS)	Sayaka Akase (JPN)
2016 Windsor	Katinka Hosszú (HUN)	Daryna Zevina (UKR)	Emily Seebohm (AUS)
2018 Hangzhou	Lisa Bratton (USA)	Kathleen Baker (USA)	Emily Seebohm (AUS)
2021 Hangzhou	Rhyan White (USA)	Kylie Masse (CAN)	Isabelle Stadden (USA)
2022 Melbourne	Kaylee McKeown (AUS)	Claire Curzan (USA)	Kylie Masse (CAN)
2024 Budapest	Regan Smith (USA)	Summer McIntosh (CAN)	Anastasiya Shkurdai (NAA)

Rank	Nation	Gold	Silver	Bronze	Total
1	United States	6	5	4	15
2	China	2	1	1	4
3	Hungary	2			2
4	Australia	1	4	3	8
5	Germany	1	1	1	3
5	Japan	1	1	1	3
5	Ukraine	1	1	1	3
8	Denmark	1			1
8	France	1			1
8	Zimbabwe	1			1
11	Canada		2	2	4
12	Great Britain		2		2
13	New Zealand			2	2
14	Spain			1	1
14	Neutral Athletes A			1	1
Total		17	17	17	51

== 50 metre breaststroke ==
Year	Gold	Silver	Bronze
1999 Hong Kong	Masami Tanaka (JPN)	Penelope Heyns (RSA)	Xue Han (CHN)
2000 Athens	Sarah Poewe (RSA)	Hao Ping (CHN)	Tara Kirk (USA)
2002 Moscow	Emma Igelström (SWE)	Luo Xuejuan (CHN)	Zoë Baker (GBR)
2004 Indianapolis	Brooke Hanson (AUS)	Jade Edmistone (AUS)	Tara Kirk (USA)
2006 Shanghai	Jade Edmistone (AUS)	Brooke Hanson (AUS)	Jessica Hardy (USA)
2008 Manchester	Jessica Hardy (USA)	Kate Haywood (GBR)	none awarded
2008 Manchester	Jessica Hardy (USA)	Sarah Katsoulis (AUS)	none awarded
2010 Dubai	Rebecca Soni (USA)	Leiston Pickett (AUS)	Zhao Jin (CHN)
2012 Istanbul	Rūta Meilutytė (LTU)	Alia Atkinson (JAM)	Sarah Katsoulis (AUS)
2014 Doha	Rūta Meilutytė (LTU)	Alia Atkinson (JAM)	Moniek Nijhuis (NED)
2016 Windsor	Lilly King (USA)	Alia Atkinson (JAM)	Molly Hannis (USA)
2018 Hangzhou	Alia Atkinson (JAM)	Rūta Meilutytė (LTU)	Martina Carraro (ITA)
2021 Abu Dhabi	Anastasia Gorbenko (ISR)	Benedetta Pilato (ITA)	Sophie Hansson (SWE)
2022 Melbourne	Rūta Meilutytė (LTU)	Lara van Niekerk (RSA)	Lilly King (USA)
2024 Budapest	Rūta Meilutytė (LTU)	Tang Qianting (CHN)	Lilly King (USA)

Rank	Nation	Gold	Silver	Bronze	Total
1	Lithuania	4	1		5
2	United States	3		6	9
3	Australia	2	4	1	7
4	Jamaica	1	3		4
5	South Africa	1	2		3
6	Sweden	1		1	2
7	Japan	1			1
7	Israel	1			1
9	China		3	2	5
10	Italy		1	1	2
10	Great Britain		1	1	2
12	Netherlands			1	1
Total		14	15	13	42

== 100 metre breaststroke ==
Year	Gold	Silver	Bronze
1993 Palma de Mallorca	Dai Guohong (CHN)	Linley Frame (AUS)	Samantha Riley (AUS)
1995 Rio de Janeiro	Samantha Riley (AUS)	Svitlana Bondarenko (UKR)	Linley Frame (AUS)
1997 Gothenburg	Kristy Ellem (AUS)	Alicja Pęczak (POL)	Svitlana Bondarenko (UKR)
1999 Hong Kong	Masami Tanaka (JPN)	Penelope Heyns (RSA)	Samantha Riley (AUS)
2000 Athens	Sarah Poewe (RSA)	Alicja Pęczak (POL)	Yelena Bogomazova (RUS)
2002 Moscow	Emma Igelström (SWE)	Sarah Poewe (RSA)	Luo Xuejuan (CHN)
2004 Indianapolis	Brooke Hanson (AUS)	Jade Edmistone (AUS)	Tara Kirk (USA)
2006 Shanghai	Tara Kirk (USA)	Suzaan van Biljon (RSA)	Jade Edmistone (AUS)
2008 Manchester	Jessica Hardy (USA)	Jade Edmistone (AUS)	Suzaan van Biljon (RSA)
2010 Dubai	Rebecca Soni (USA)	Leisel Jones (AUS)	Ji Liping (CHN)
2012 Istanbul	Rūta Meilutytė (LTU)	Alia Atkinson (JAM)	Rikke Møller Pedersen (DEN)
2014 Doha	Alia Atkinson (JAM)	Rūta Meilutytė (LTU)	Moniek Nijhuis (NED)
2016 Windsor	Alia Atkinson (JAM)	Lilly King (USA)	Molly Hannis (USA)
2018 Hangzhou	Alia Atkinson (JAM)	Katie Meili (USA)	Jessica Hansen (AUS)
2021 Abu Dhabi	Tang Qianting (CHN)	Sophie Hansson (SWE)	Mona McSharry (IRL)
2022 Melbourne	Lilly King (USA)	Tes Schouten (NED)	Anna Elendt (GER)
2024 Budapest	Tang Qianting (CHN)	Lilly King (USA)	Eneli Jefimova (EST)

Rank	Nation	Gold	Silver	Bronze	Total
1	United States	4	3	2	9
2	Jamaica	3	1		4
3	China	3		2	5
4	Australia	2	5	4	11
5	South Africa	1	3	1	5
6	Sweden	1	1		2
6	Lithuania	1	1		2
8	Ukraine	1		1	2
9	Japan	1			1
10	Poland		2		2
11	Netherlands		1	1	2
12	Canada			1	1
12	Germany			1	1
12	Ireland			1	1
12	Russia			1	1
12	Denmark			1	1
12	Estonia			1	1
Total		17	17	17	51

== 200 metre breaststroke ==
Year	Gold	Silver	Bronze
1993 Palma de Mallorca	Dai Guohong (CHN)	Hitomi Machara (JPN)	Samantha Riley (AUS)
1995 Rio de Janeiro	Samantha Riley (AUS)	Svitlana Bondarenko (UKR)	Alicja Pęczak (POL)
1997 Gothenburg	Kristy Ellem (AUS)	Larisa Lăcustă (ROM)	Alicja Pęczak (POL)
1999 Hong Kong	Masami Tanaka (JPN)	Penelope Heyns (RSA)	Qi Hui (CHN)
2000 Athens	Rebecca Brown (AUS)	Alicja Pęczak (POL)	Brooke Hanson (AUS)
2002 Moscow	Qi Hui (CHN)	Emma Igelström (SWE)	Mirna Jukić (AUT)
2004 Indianapolis	Brooke Hanson (AUS)	Amanda Beard (USA)	Sarah Katsoulis (AUS)
2006 Shanghai	Qi Hui (CHN)	Tara Kirk (USA)	Luo Nan (CHN)
2008 Manchester	Suzaan van Biljon (RSA)	Sally Foster (AUS)	Yuliya Yefimova (RUS)
2010 Dubai	Rebecca Soni (USA)	Sun Ye (CHN)	Rikke Møller Pedersen (DEN)
2012 Istanbul	Rikke Møller Pedersen (DEN)	Laura Sogar (USA)	Kanako Watanabe (JPN)
2014 Doha	Kanako Watanabe (JPN)	Rie Kaneto (JPN)	Rikke Møller Pedersen (DEN)
2016 Windsor	Molly Renshaw (GBR)	Kelsey Wog (CAN)	Chloé Tutton (GBR)
2018 Hangzhou	Annie Lazor (USA)	Bethany Galat (USA)	Fanny Lecluyse (BEL)
2021 Abu Dhabi	Emily Escobedo (USA)	Evgeniia Chikunova (RSF)	Molly Renshaw (GBR)
2022 Melbourne	Kate Douglass (USA)	Lilly King (USA)	Tes Schouten (NED)
2024 Budapest	Kate Douglass (USA)	Evgeniia Chikunova (NAB)	Alex Walsh (USA)

Rank	Nation	Gold	Silver	Bronze	Total
1	United States	5	5	1	11
2	Australia	3	1	3	7
3	China	3	1	2	6
4	Japan	2	2	1	5
5	South Africa	1	1		2
6	Denmark	1		2	3
6	Great Britain	1		2	3
8	Ukraine	1			1
9	Poland		2	1	3
10	Sweden		1	1	2
11	Romania		1		1
11	Canada		1		1
11	RSF		1		1
11	Neutral Athletes B		1		1
15	Austria			1	1
15	Russia			1	1
15	Belgium			1	1
15	Netherlands			1	1
Total		17	17	17	51

== 50 metre butterfly ==
Year	Gold	Silver	Bronze
1999 Hong Kong	Jenny Thompson (USA)	Anna-Karin Kammerling (SWE)	Inge de Bruijn (NED)
2000 Athens	Jenny Thompson (USA)	Anna-Karin Kammerling (SWE)	Nicola Jackson (GBR)
2002 Moscow	Anna-Karin Kammerling (SWE)	Petria Thomas (AUS)	Vered Borochovski (ISR)
2004 Indianapolis	Jenny Thompson (USA)	Anna-Karin Kammerling (SWE)	Lisbeth Lenton (AUS)
2006 Shanghai	Therese Alshammar (SWE)	Fabienne Nadarajah (AUT)	Anna-Karin Kammerling (SWE)
2008 Manchester	Felicity Galvez (AUS)	Hinkelien Schreuder (NED)	Inge Dekker (NED)
2010 Dubai	Therese Alshammar (SWE)	Felicity Galvez (AUS)	Jeanette Ottesen (DEN)
2012 Istanbul	Lu Ying (CHN)	Jiao Liuyang (CHN)	Jeanette Ottesen (DEN)
2014 Doha	Sarah Sjöström (SWE)	Jeanette Ottesen (DEN)	Inge Dekker (NED)
2016 Windsor	Jeanette Ottesen (DEN)	Kelsi Worrell (USA)	Rikako Ikee (JPN)
2018 Hangzhou	Ranomi Kromowidjojo (NED)	Holly Barratt (AUS)	Kelsi Dahlia (USA)
2021 Abu Dhabi	Ranomi Kromowidjojo (NED)	Sarah Sjöström (SWE)	Claire Curzan (USA)
2022 Melbourne	Torri Huske (USA) Maggie Mac Neil (CAN)	Not awarded	Zhang Yufei (CHN)
2024 Budapest	Gretchen Walsh (USA)	Béryl Gastaldello (FRA)	Alexandria Perkins (AUS)

Rank	Nation	Gold	Silver	Bronze	Total
1	United States	5	1	2	8
2	Sweden	4	4	1	9
3	Netherlands	2	1	3	6
4	Australia	1	3	2	6
5	Denmark	1	1	2	4
6	China	1	1	1	3
7	Canada	1			1
8	Austria		1		1
8	France		1		1
10	Great Britain			1	1
10	Israel			1	1
10	Japan			1	1
Total		15	13	14	42

== 100 metre butterfly ==
Year	Gold	Silver	Bronze
1993 Palma de Mallorca	Susie O'Neill (AUS)	Liu Limin (CHN)	Kristie Kruger (USA)
1995 Rio de Janeiro	Liu Limin (CHN)	Susie O'Neill (AUS)	Angela Kennedy (USA)
1997 Gothenburg	Jenny Thompson (USA)	Cai Huijue (CHN)	Misty Hyman (USA)
1999 Hong Kong	Jenny Thompson (USA)	Johanna Sjöberg (SWE)	Ayari Aoyama (JPN)
2000 Athens	Jenny Thompson (USA)	Johanna Sjöberg (SWE)	Karen Campbell (USA)
2002 Moscow	Martina Moravcová (SVK)	Petria Thomas (AUS)	Anna-Karin Kammerling (SWE)
2004 Indianapolis	Martina Moravcová (SVK)	Rachel Komisarz (USA)	Jenny Thompson (USA)
2006 Shanghai	Lisbeth Lenton (AUS)	Rachel Komisarz (USA)	Jessicah Schipper (AUS)
2008 Manchester	Felicity Galvez (AUS)	Rachel Komisarz (USA)	Jemma Lowe (GBR)
2010 Dubai	Felicity Galvez (AUS)	Therese Alshammar (SWE)	Dana Vollmer (USA)
2012 Istanbul	Ilaria Bianchi (ITA)	Liu Zige (CHN)	Jemma Lowe (GBR)
2014 Doha	Sarah Sjöström (SWE)	Lu Ying (CHN)	Jeanette Ottesen (DEN)
2016 Windsor	Katinka Hosszú (HUN)	Kelsi Worrell (USA)	Rikako Ikee (JPN)
2018 Hangzhou	Kelsi Dahlia (USA)	Kendyl Stewart (USA)	Daiene Dias (BRA)
2021 Abu Dhabi	Maggie Mac Neil (CAN)	Louise Hansson (SWE)	Claire Curzan (USA)
2022 Melbourne	Maggie Mac Neil (CAN)	Torri Huske (USA)	Louise Hansson (SWE)
2024 Budapest	Gretchen Walsh (USA)	Tessa Giele (NED)	Alexandria Perkins (AUS)

Rank	Nation	Gold	Silver	Bronze	Total
1	United States	5	6	7	18
2	Australia	4	2	2	8
3	Slovakia	2			2
3	Canada	2			2
5	Sweden	1	4	2	7
6	China	1	4		5
7	Italy	1			1
7	Hungary	1			1
9	Netherlands		1		1
10	Great Britain			2	2
10	Japan			2	2
12	Denmark			1	1
12	Brazil			1	1
Total		17	17	17	51

== 200 metre butterfly ==
Year	Gold	Silver	Bronze
1993 Palma de Mallorca	Liu Limin (CHN)	Susie O'Neill (AUS)	Petria Thomas (AUS)
1995 Rio de Janeiro	Susie O'Neill (AUS)	Liu Limin (CHN)	Mette Jacobsen (DEN)
1997 Gothenburg	Liu Limin (CHN)	Hitomi Kashima (JPN)	Misty Hyman (USA)
1999 Hong Kong	Mette Jacobsen (DEN)	Petria Thomas (AUS)	Sophia Skou (DEN)
2000 Athens	Mette Jacobsen (DEN)	Katrin Jake (GER)	Otylia Jędrzejczak (POL)
2002 Moscow	Petria Thomas (AUS)	Yang Yu (CHN)	Mary Descenza (USA)
2004 Indianapolis	Kaitlin Sandeno (USA)	Mary Descenza (USA)	Audrey Lacroix (CAN)
2006 Shanghai	Jessicah Schipper (AUS)	Francesca Segat (ITA)	Yang Yu (CHN)
2008 Manchester	Mary Descenza (USA)	Felicity Galvez (AUS)	Jessica Dickons (GBR)
2010 Dubai	Mireia Belmonte (ESP)	Jemma Lowe (GBR)	Petra Granlund (SWE)
2012 Istanbul	Katinka Hosszú (HUN)	Jiao Liuyang (CHN)	Jemma Lowe (GBR)
2014 Doha	Mireia Belmonte (ESP)	Katinka Hosszú (HUN)	Franziska Hentke (GER)
2016 Windsor	Katinka Hosszú (HUN)	Kelsi Worrell (USA)	Zhang Yufei (CHN)
2018 Hangzhou	Katinka Hosszú (HUN)	Kelsi Dahlia (USA)	Suzuka Hasegawa (JPN)
2021 Abu Dhabi	Zhang Yufei (CHN)	Charlotte Hook (USA)	Lana Pudar (BIH)
2022 Melbourne	Dakota Luther (USA)	Hali Flickinger (USA)	Elizabeth Dekkers (AUS)
2024 Budapest	Summer McIntosh (CAN)	Regan Smith (USA)	Elizabeth Dekkers (AUS)

Rank	Nation	Gold	Silver	Bronze	Total
1	United States	3	6	2	11
2	Australia	3	3	3	9
3	China	3	3	2	8
4	Hungary	3	1		4
5	Denmark	2		2	4
6	Spain	2			2
7	Canada	1		1	2
8	Great Britain		1	2	3
9	Germany		1	1	2
9	Japan		1	1	2
11	Italy		1		1
12	Poland			1	1
12	Sweden			1	1
12	Bosnia and Herzegovina			1	1
Total		17	17	17	51

== 100 metre individual medley ==
Year	Gold	Silver	Bronze
1999 Hong Kong	Martina Moravcová (SVK)	Lori Munz (AUS)	Oxana Verevka (RUS)
2000 Athens	Martina Moravcová (SVK)	Marianne Limpert (CAN)	Alenka Kejžar (SLO)
2002 Moscow	Martina Moravcová (SVK)	Gabrielle Rose (USA)	Alison Sheppard (GBR)
2004 Indianapolis	Brooke Hanson (AUS)	Shayne Reese (AUS)	Martina Moravcová (SVK)
2006 Shanghai	Brooke Hanson (AUS)	Hanna-Maria Seppälä (FIN)	Martina Moravcová (SVK)
2008 Manchester	Shayne Reese (AUS)	Hanna-Maria Seppälä (FIN)	Kirsty Coventry (ZIM)
2010 Dubai	Ariana Kukors (USA)	Kotuku Ngawati (AUS)	Hinkelien Schreuder (NED)
2012 Istanbul	Katinka Hosszú (HUN)	Rūta Meilutytė (LTU)	Zhao Jing (CHN)
2014 Doha	Katinka Hosszú (HUN)	Siobhan-Marie O'Connor (GBR)	Emily Seebohm (AUS)
2016 Windsor	Katinka Hosszú (HUN)	Emily Seebohm (AUS)	Alia Atkinson (JAM)
2018 Hangzhou	Katinka Hosszú (HUN)	Runa Imai (JPN)	Alia Atkinson (JAM)
2021 Abu Dhabi	Anastasia Gorbenko (ISR)	Béryl Gastaldello (FRA)	Maria Kameneva (RSF)
2022 Melbourne	Marrit Steenbergen (NED)	Béryl Gastaldello (FRA)	Louise Hansson (SWE)
2024 Budapest	Gretchen Walsh (USA)	Kate Douglass (USA)	Béryl Gastaldello (FRA)

Rank	Nation	Gold	Silver	Bronze	Total
1	Hungary	4			4
2	Australia	3	4	1	8
3	Slovakia	3		2	5
4	United States	2	2		4
5	Netherlands	1		1	2
6	Israel	1			1
7	France		2	1	3
8	Finland		2		2
9	Great Britain		1	1	2
10	Canada		1		1
10	Lithuania		1		1
10	Japan		1		1
13	Lithuania			2	2
14	Russia			1	1
14	Slovenia			1	1
14	Zimbabwe			1	1
14	China			1	1
14	RSF			1	1
14	Sweden			1	1
Total		14	14	14	42

== 200 metre individual medley ==
Year	Gold	Silver	Bronze
1993 Palma de Mallorca	Allison Wagner (USA)	Dai Guohong (CHN)	Elli Overton (AUS)
1995 Rio de Janeiro	Elli Overton (AUS)	Martina Moravcová (SVK)	Louise Karlsson (SWE)
1997 Gothenburg	Louise Karlsson (SWE)	Martina Moravcová (SVK)	Sue Rolph (GBR)
1999 Hong Kong	Martina Moravcová (SVK)	Yana Klochkova (UKR)	Oxana Verevka (RUS)
2000 Athens	Yana Klochkova (UKR)	Martina Moravcová (SVK)	Marianne Limpert (CAN)
2002 Moscow	Yana Klochkova (UKR)	Gabrielle Rose (USA)	Oxana Verevka (RUS)
2004 Indianapolis	Brooke Hanson (AUS)	Lara Carroll (AUS)	Katie Hoff (USA)
2006 Shanghai	Qi Hui (CHN)	Kaitlin Sandeno (USA)	Lara Carroll (AUS)
2008 Manchester	Kirsty Coventry (ZIM)	Mireia Belmonte (ESP)	Hannah Miley (GBR)
2010 Dubai	Mireia Belmonte (ESP)	Ye Shiwen (CHN)	Ariana Kukors (USA)
2012 Istanbul	Ye Shiwen (CHN)	Katinka Hosszú (HUN)	Hannah Miley (GBR)
2014 Doha	Katinka Hosszú (HUN)	Siobhan-Marie O'Connor (GBR)	Melanie Margalis (USA)
2016 Windsor	Katinka Hosszú (HUN)	Ella Eastin (USA)	Madisyn Cox (USA)
2018 Hangzhou	Katinka Hosszú (HUN)	Melanie Margalis (USA)	Kathleen Baker (USA)
2021 Abu Dhabi	Sydney Pickrem (CAN)	Yu Yiting (CHN)	Kate Douglass (USA)
2022 Melbourne	Kate Douglass (USA)	Alex Walsh (USA)	Kaylee McKeown (AUS)
2024 Budapest	Kate Douglass (USA)	Alex Walsh (USA)	Abbie Wood (GBR)

Rank	Nation	Gold	Silver	Bronze	Total
1	United States	3	6	6	15
2	Hungary	3	1		4
3	China	2	3		5
4	Australia	2	1	3	6
5	Ukraine	2	1		3
6	Slovakia	1	3		4
7	Spain	1	1		2
8	Sweden	1		1	2
8	Canada	1		1	2
9	Zimbabwe	1			1
11	Great Britain		1	4	5
12	Russia			2	2
Total		17	17	17	51

== 400 metre individual medley ==
Year	Gold	Silver	Bronze
1993 Palma de Mallorca	Dai Guohong (CHN)	Allison Wagner (USA)	Julie Majer (AUS)
1995 Rio de Janeiro	Joanne Malar (CAN)	Nancy Sweetnam (CAN)	Britt Vestergaard (DEN)
1997 Gothenburg	Emma Johnson (AUS)	Sabine Herbst (GER)	Joanne Malar (CAN)
1999 Hong Kong	Yana Klochkova (UKR)	Joanne Malar (CAN)	Lourdes Becerra (ESP)
2000 Athens	Yana Klochkova (UKR)	Nicole Hetzer (GER)	Katie Yevak (USA)
2002 Moscow	Yana Klochkova (UKR)	Alenka Kejžar (SLO)	Georgina Bardach (ARG)
2004 Indianapolis	Kaitlin Sandeno (USA)	Katie Hoff (USA)	Lara Carroll (AUS)
2006 Shanghai	Qi Hui (CHN)	Alessia Filippi (ITA)	Anastasiya Ivanenko (RUS)
2008 Manchester	Kirsty Coventry (ZIM)	Hannah Miley (GBR)	Mireia Belmonte (ESP)
2010 Dubai	Mireia Belmonte (ESP)	Ye Shiwen (CHN)	Li Xuanxu (CHN)
2012 Istanbul	Hannah Miley (GBR)	Ye Shiwen (CHN)	Katinka Hosszú (HUN)
2014 Doha	Mireia Belmonte (ESP)	Katinka Hosszú (HUN)	Hannah Miley (GBR)
2016 Windsor	Katinka Hosszú (HUN)	Ella Eastin (USA)	Madisyn Cox (USA)
2018 Hangzhou	Katinka Hosszú (HUN)	Melanie Margalis (USA)	Fantine Lesaffre (FRA)
2021 Abu Dhabi	Tessa Cieplucha (CAN)	Ellen Walshe (IRL)	Melanie Margalis (USA)
2022 Melbourne	Hali Flickinger (USA)	Sara Franceschi (ITA)	Waka Kobori (JPN)
2024 Budapest	Summer McIntosh (CAN)	Katie Grimes (USA)	Abbie Wood (GBR)

Rank	Nation	Gold	Silver	Bronze	Total
1	Canada	3	2	1	6
2	Ukraine	3			3
3	United States	2	5	3	10
4	China	2	2	1	5
5	Hungary	2	1	1	4
6	Spain	2		2	4
7	Great Britain	1	1	2	4
8	Australia	1		2	3
9	Zimbabwe	1			1
10	Germany		2		2
10	Italy		2		2
12	Slovenia		1		1
12	Ireland		1		1
14	Denmark			1	1
14	Argentina			1	1
14	Russia			1	1
14	France			1	1
14	Japan			1	1
Total		17	17	17	51

== 4 × 50 metre freestyle relay ==
Year	Gold	Silver	Bronze
2014 Doha	Netherlands (NED); Inge Dekker; Femke Heemskerk; Maud van der Meer; Ranomi Kromowidjojo	United States (USA); Madison Kennedy; Abbey Weitzeil; Natalie Coughlin; Amy Bilquist	Denmark (DEN); Jeanette Ottesen; Julie Levisen; Mie Nielsen; Pernille Blume
2016 Windsor	Canada (CAN); Michelle Williams; Sandrine Mainville; Taylor Ruck; Penny Oleksiak	Netherlands (NED); Tamara van Vliet; Ranomi Kromowidjojo; Maaike de Waard; Kim Busch	Italy (ITA); Silvia Di Pietro; Erika Ferraioli; Aglaia Pezzato; Federica Pellegrini
2018 Hangzhou	United States (USA); Madison Kennedy; Mallory Comerford; Kelsi Dahlia; Erika Brown	Netherlands (NED); Ranomi Kromowidjojo; Femke Heemskerk; Kim Busch; Valerie van Roon	Australia (AUS); Holly Barratt; Emily Seebohm; Minna Atherton; Carla Buchanan
2021 Abu Dhabi	United States (USA); Abbey Weitzeil; Claire Curzan; Katharine Berkoff; Kate Douglass	Sweden (SWE); Sarah Sjöström; Michelle Coleman; Sara Junevik; Louise Hansson	Netherlands (NED); Kim Busch; Maaike De Waard; Kira Toussaint; Ranomi Kromowidjojo
2022 Melbourne	United States (USA); Torri Huske; Claire Curzan; Erika Brown; Kate Douglass	Australia (AUS); Meg Harris; Madison Wilson; Mollie O'Callaghan; Emma McKeon	Netherlands (NED); Kim Busch; Maaike de Waard; Kira Toussaint; Valerie van Roon

Rank	Nation	Gold	Silver	Bronze	Total
1	United States	3	1		4
2	Netherlands	1	2	2	5
3	Canada	1			1
4	Australia		1	1	2
5	Sweden		1		1
6	Denmark			1	1
6	Italy			1	1
Total		5	5	5	15

== 4 × 100 metre freestyle relay ==
Year	Gold	Silver	Bronze
1993 Palma de Mallorca	China (CHN); Lü Bin; Shan Ying; Jia Yuanyuan; Le Jingyi	Sweden (SWE); Ellenor Svensson; Linda Olofsson; Suzanne Lööv; Louise Jöhncke	United States (USA); Angel Martino; Sarah Perroni; Kristie Krueger; Paige Wilson
1995 Rio de Janeiro	China (CHN); Chao Na; Shan Ying; Han Xue; Le Jingyi	Australia (AUS); Melanie Dodd; Sarah Ryan; Anna Windsor; Susie O'Neill	Sweden (SWE); Johanna Sjöberg; Louise Karlsson; Linda Olofsson; Louise Jöhncke
1997 Gothenburg	China (CHN); Le Jingyi; Chao Na; Shan Ying; Nian Yun	Germany (GER); Simone Osygus; Antje Buschschulte; Katrin Meissner; Sandra Völker	Sweden (SWE); Johanna Sjöberg; Louise Karlsson; Malin Svahnström; Therese Alshammar
1999 Hong Kong	Great Britain (GBR); Alison Sheppard; Claire Huddart; Karen Pickering; Sue Rolph	Netherlands (NED); Thamar Henneken; Wilma van Hofwegen; Chantal Groot; Inge de Bruijn	Australia (AUS); Lori Munz; Rebecca Creedy; Melanie Dodd; Sarah Ryan
2000 Athens	Sweden (SWE); Louise Jöhncke; Therese Alshammar; Anna-Karin Kammerling; Johanna Sjöberg	Germany (GER); Katrin Meissner; Antje Buschschulte; Britta Steffen; Sandra Völker	Great Britain (GBR); Alison Sheppard; Claire Huddart; Karen Legg; Karen Pickering
2002 Moscow	Sweden (SWE); Josefin Lillhage; Therese Alshammar; Johanna Sjöberg; Anna-Karin Kammerling	Australia (AUS); Sarah Ryan; Petria Thomas; Giaan Rooney; Elka Graham	China (CHN); Yang Yu; Tang Jingzhi; Zhu Yingwen; Xu Yanwei
2004 Indianapolis	United States (USA); Amanda Weir; Kara Lynn Joyce; Lindsay Benko; Jenny Thompson	Sweden (SWE); Josefin Lillhage; Anna-Karin Kammerling; Johanna Sjöberg; Therese Alshammar	Australia (AUS); Libby Lenton; Louise Tomlinson; Danni Miatke; Shayne Reese
2006 Shanghai	Netherlands (NED); Inge Dekker; Hinkelien Schreuder; Chantal Groot; Marleen Veldhuis	Australia (AUS); Shayne Reese; Sophie Edington; Danni Miatke; Libby Lenton	Sweden (SWE); Josefin Lillhage; Therese Alshammar; Anna-Karin Kammerling; Ida Mattsson
2008 Manchester	Netherlands (NED); Hinkelien Schreuder; Femke Heemskerk; Inge Dekker; Marleen Veldhuis	Australia (AUS); Alice Mills; Shayne Reese; Kelly Stubbins; Angie Bainbridge	Great Britain (GBR); Francesca Halsall; Caitlin McClatchey; Julia Beckett; Melanie Marshall
2010 Dubai	Netherlands (NED); Femke Heemskerk; Inge Dekker; Hinkelien Schreuder; Ranomi Kromowidjojo	United States (USA); Natalie Coughlin; Katie Hoff; Jessica Hardy; Dana Vollmer	China (CHN); Tang Yi; Zhu Qianwei; Pang Jiaying; Li Zhesi
2012 Istanbul	United States (USA); Megan Romano; Jessica Hardy; Lia Neal; Allison Schmitt	Australia (AUS); Angie Bainbridge; Marieke Guehrer; Brianna Throssell; Sally Foster	Denmark (DEN); Mie Nielsen; Pernille Blume; Kelly Rasmussen; Jeanette Ottesen
2014 Doha	Netherlands (NED); Inge Dekker; Femke Heemskerk; Maud van der Meer; Ranomi Kromowidjojo	United States (USA); Natalie Coughlin; Abbey Weitzeil; Madison Kennedy; Shannon Vreeland	Italy (ITA); Erika Ferraioli; Silvia Di Pietro; Aglaia Pezzato; Federica Pellegrini
2016 Windsor	United States (USA); Amanda Weir; Kelsi Worrell; Madison Kennedy; Mallory Comerford	Italy (ITA); Erika Ferraioli; Silvia Di Pietro; Aglaia Pezzato; Federica Pellegrini	Netherlands (NED); Maud van der Meer; Marrit Steenbergen; Maaike de Waard; Ranomi Kromowidjojo
2018 Hangzhou	United States (USA); Olivia Smoliga; Lia Neal; Mallory Comerford; Kelsi Dahlia	Netherlands (NED); Kim Busch; Femke Heemskerk; Maaike de Waard; Ranomi Kromowidjojo	China (CHN); Zhu Menghui; Yang Junxuan; Liu Xiaohan; Wang Jingzhuo
2021 Abu Dhabi	United States (USA); Kate Douglass; Claire Curzan; Katharine Berkoff; Abbey Weitzeil	none awarded	Sweden (SWE); Sarah Sjöström; Michelle Coleman; Sophie Hansson; Louise Hansson
2021 Abu Dhabi	Canada (CAN); Kayla Sanchez; Maggie Mac Neil; Rebecca Smith; Katerine Savard	none awarded	Sweden (SWE); Sarah Sjöström; Michelle Coleman; Sophie Hansson; Louise Hansson
2022 Melbourne	Australia (AUS); Mollie O'Callaghan; Madison Wilson; Meg Harris; Emma McKeon	United States (USA); Torri Huske; Kate Douglass; Claire Curzan; Erika Brown	Canada (CAN); Rebecca Smith; Taylor Ruck; Maggie Mac Neil; Katerine Savard
2024 Budapest	United States (USA); Kate Douglass; Katharine Berkoff; Alex Shackell; Gretchen Walsh	Australia (AUS); Meg Harris; Milla Jansen; Alexandria Perkins; Lani Pallister	Canada (CAN); Mary-Sophie Harvey; Summer McIntosh; Ingrid Wilm; Penny Oleksiak

Rank	Nation	Gold	Silver	Bronze	Total
1	United States	6	3	1	10
2	Netherlands	4	2	1	7
3	China	3		3	6
4	Sweden	2	2	4	8
5	Australia	1	6	2	9
6	Great Britain	1		2	3
6	Canada	1		2	3
8	Germany		2		2
9	Italy		1	1	2
10	Denmark			1	1
Total		18	16	17	51

== 4 × 200 metre freestyle relay ==
Year	Gold	Silver	Bronze
1993 Palma de Mallorca	China (CHN); Shan Ying; Zhou Guanbin; Le Jingyi; Lü Bin	Australia (AUS); Tammy Bruce; Elli Overton; Anna Windsor; Susie O'Neill	United States (USA); Paige Wilson; Sarah Perroni; Trina Jackson; Janet Evans
1995 Rio de Janeiro	Canada (CAN); Marianne Limpert; Shannon Shakespeare; Sarah Evanetz; Joanne Malar	Germany (GER); Dagmar Hase; Kerstin Kielgass; Julia Jung; Franziska van Almsick	Australia (AUS); Anna Windsor; Samantha Mackie; Nicole Stevenson; Susie O'Neill
1997 Gothenburg	China (CHN); Wang Luna; Nian Yun; Chen Yan; Shan Ying	Sweden (SWE); Johanna Sjöberg; Josefin Lillhage; Louise Jöhncke; Malin Nilsson	Australia (AUS); Julia Greville; Natasha Bowron; Lise Mackie; Emma Johnson
1999 Hong Kong	Sweden (SWE); Josefin Lillhage; Louise Jöhncke; Johanna Sjöberg; Malin Svahnström	Great Britain (GBR); Claire Huddart; Karen Legg; Nicola Jackson; Karen Pickering	Australia (AUS); Lori Munz; Jacinta van Lint; Rebecca Creedy; Giaan Rooney
2000 Athens	Great Britain (GBR); Claire Huddart; Nicola Jackson; Karen Legg; Karen Pickering	United States (USA); Lindsay Benko; Brooke Bennett; Tammie Stone; Jenny Thompson	China (CHN); Sun Dan; Yang Lina; Li Jin; Yang Yu
2002 Moscow	China (CHN); Xu Yanwei; Zhu Yingwen; Tang Jingzhi; Yang Yu	United States (USA); Lindsay Benko; Gabrielle Rose; Colleen Lanne; Rachel Komisarz	Australia (AUS); Elka Graham; Petria Thomas; Lori Munz; Giaan Rooney
2004 Indianapolis	United States (USA); Dana Vollmer; Rachel Komisarz; Lindsay Benko; Kaitlin Sandeno	Australia (AUS); Libby Lenton; Danni Miatke; Louise Tomlinson; Shayne Reese	Sweden (SWE); Ida Mattsson; Johanna Sjöberg; Josefin Lillhage; Petra Granlund
2006 Shanghai	Australia (AUS); Bronte Barratt; Jessicah Schipper; Shayne Reese; Libby Lenton	China (CHN); Pang Jiaying; Tang Jingzhi; Xu Yanwei; Yang Yu	United States (USA); Kate Ziegler; Rachel Komisarz; Amanda Weir; Kaitlin Sandeno
2008 Manchester	Netherlands (NED); Inge Dekker; Femke Heemskerk; Marleen Veldhuis; Ranomi Kromowidjojo	Great Britain (GBR); Joanne Jackson; Melanie Marshall; Caitlin McClatchey; Rebecca Adlington	Australia (AUS); Bronte Barratt; Angie Bainbridge; Kelly Stubbins; Kylie Palmer
2010 Dubai	China (CHN); Chen Qian; Tang Yi; Liu Jing; Zhu Qianwei	Australia (AUS); Blair Evans; Jade Neilsen; Kelly Stubbins; Kylie Palmer	France (FRA); Camille Muffat; Coralie Balmy; Mylène Lazare; Ophélie Etienne
2012 Istanbul	United States (USA); Megan Romano; Chelsea Chenault; Shannon Vreeland; Allison Schmitt	Russia (RUS); Veronika Popova; Elena Sokolova; Daria Belyakina; Ksenia Yuskova	China (CHN); Qui Yuhan; Pang Jiaying; Guo Junjun; Tang Yi
2014 Doha	Netherlands (NED); Inge Dekker; Femke Heemskerk; Ranomi Kromowidjojo; Sharon van Rouwendaal	China (CHN); Qiu Yuhan; Cao Yue; Guo Junjun; Shen Duo	Australia (AUS); Leah Neale; Madison Wilson; Brianna Throssell; Kylie Palmer
2016 Windsor	Canada (CAN); Katerine Savard; Taylor Ruck; Kennedy Goss; Penny Oleksiak	United States (USA); Leah Smith; Mallory Comerford; Sarah Gibson; Madisyn Cox	Russia (RUS); Daria Mullakaeva; Daria Ustinova; Arina Openysheva; Veronika Popova
2018 Hangzhou	China (CHN); Li Bingjie; Yang Junxuan; Zhang Yuhan; Wang Jianjiahe	United States (USA); Leah Smith; Mallory Comerford; Melanie Margalis; Erika Brown	Australia (AUS); Ariarne Titmus; Minna Atherton; Carla Buchanan; Abbey Harkin
2021 Abu Dhabi	Canada (CAN); Summer McIntosh; Kayla Sanchez; Katerine Savard; Rebecca Smith	United States (USA); Torri Huske; Abbey Weitzeil; Melanie Margalis; Paige Madden	China (CHN); Li Bingjie; Cheng Yujie; Zhu Menghui; Liu Yaxin
2022 Melbourne	Australia (AUS); Madison Wilson; Mollie O'Callaghan; Leah Neale; Lani Pallister	Canada (CAN); Rebecca Smith; Katerine Savard; Mary-Sophie Harvey; Taylor Ruck	United States (USA); Alex Walsh; Hali Flickinger; Erin Gemmell; Leah Smith
2024 Budapest	United States (USA); Alex Walsh; Paige Madden; Katie Grimes; Claire Weinstein	Hungary (HUN); Nikolett Pádár; Panna Ugrai; Dóra Molnár; Lilla Minna Ábrahám	Australia (AUS); Leah Neale; Elizabeth Dekkers; Milla Jansen; Lani Pallister

Rank	Nation	Gold	Silver	Bronze	Total
1	China	5	2	3	10
2	United States	3	5	3	11
3	Canada	3	1		4
4	Australia	2	3	8	13
5	Netherlands	2			2
6	Great Britain	1	2		3
7	Sweden	1	1	1	3
8	Russia		1	1	2
9	Germany		1		1
9	Hungary		1		1
10	France			1	1
Total		17	17	17	51

== 4 × 50 metre medley relay ==
Year	Gold	Silver	Bronze
2014 Doha	Denmark (DEN); Mie Nielsen; Rikke Pedersen; Jeanette Ottesen; Pernille Blume	United States (USA); Felicia Lee; Emma Reaney; Claire Donahue; Natalie Coughlin	France (FRA); Mathilde Cini; Charlotte Bonnet; Mélanie Henique; Anna Santamans
2016 Windsor	United States (USA); Ali DeLoof; Lilly King; Kelsi Worrell; Katrina Konopka	Italy (ITA); Silvia Scalia; Martina Carraro; Silvia Di Pietro; Erika Ferraioli	Denmark (DEN); Mie Nielsen; Matilde Schroder; Emilie Beckmann; Jeanette Ottesen
2018 Hangzhou	United States (USA); Olivia Smoliga; Katie Meili; Kelsi Dahlia; Mallory Comerford	China (CHN); Fu Yuanhui; Suo Ran; Wang Yichun; Wu Yue	Netherlands (NED); Maaike de Waard; Kim Busch; Ranomi Kromowidjojo; Femke Heemskerk
2021 Abu Dhabi	Sweden (SWE); Louise Hansson; Sophie Hansson; Sarah Sjöström; Michelle Coleman	United States (USA); Rhyan White; Lydia Jacoby; Claire Curzan; Abbey Weitzeil	Netherlands (NED); Kira Toussaint; Kim Busch; Maaike de Waard; Ranomi Kromowidjojo
2022 Melbourne	Australia (AUS); Mollie O'Callaghan; Chelsea Hodges; Emma McKeon; Madison Wilson	United States (USA); Claire Curzan; Lilly King; Torri Huske; Kate Douglass	Sweden (SWE); Louise Hansson; Klara Thormalm; Sara Junevik; Michelle Coleman

Rank	Nation	Gold	Silver	Bronze	Total
1	United States	2	3		5
2	Denmark	1		1	2
2	Sweden	1		1	2
4	Australia	1			1
5	Italy		1		1
5	China		1		1
7	Netherlands			2	2
8	France			1	1
Total		5	5	5	15

== 4 × 100 metre medley relay ==
Year	Gold	Silver	Bronze
1993 Palma de Mallorca	China (CHN); Le Jingyi; He Cihong; Liu Limin; Dai Guohong	Australia (AUS); Elli Overton; Linley Frame; Petria Thomas; Susie O'Neill	United States (USA); Angel Martino; Kelli King; Kristie Krueger; Sarah Perroni
1995 Rio de Janeiro	Australia (AUS); Elli Overton; Samantha Riley; Angela Kennedy; Susie O'Neill	Canada (CAN); Julie Howard; Lisa Flood; Jessica Amey; Shannon Shakespeare	United States (USA); Barbara Bedford; Kelli King-Bednar; Misty Hyman; Courtney Shealy
1997 Gothenburg	China (CHN); Lu Donghua; Han Xue; Cai Huijue; Le Jingyi	United States (USA); Lia Oberstar; Amanda Beard; Misty Hyman; Jenny Thompson	Australia (AUS); Meredith Smith; Kristy Ellem; Angela Kennedy; Sarah Ryan
1999 Hong Kong	Japan (JPN); Mai Nakamura; Masami Tanaka; Ayari Aoyama; Sumika Minamoto	Australia (AUS); Giaan Rooney; Samantha Riley; Petria Thomas; Lori Munz	Sweden (SWE); Therese Alshammar; Maria Östling; Johanna Sjöberg; Louise Jöhncke
2000 Athens	Sweden (SWE); Therese Alshammar; Emma Igelström; Johanna Sjöberg; Anna-Karin Kammerling	Germany (GER); Sandra Völker; Janne Schaeffer; Katrin Jaeke; Katrin Meissner	United States (USA); Jamie Reid; Anita Nall; Jenny Thompson; Tammie Stone
2002 Moscow	Sweden (SWE); Therese Alshammar; Emma Igelström; Anna-Karin Kammerling; Johanna Sjöberg	United States (USA); Haley Cope; Amanda Beard; Rachel Komisarz; Lindsay Benko	China (CHN); Zhan Shu; Luo Xuejuan; Zheng Xi; Xu Yanwei
2004 Indianapolis	Australia (AUS); Sophie Edington; Brooke Hanson; Jessicah Schipper; Libby Lenton	United States (USA); Haley Cope; Tara Kirk; Jenny Thompson; Kara Lynn Joyce	Sweden (SWE); Therese Svendsen; Sara Larsson; Johanna Sjöberg; Josefin Lillhage
2006 Shanghai	Australia (AUS); Tayliah Zimmer; Jade Edmistone; Jessicah Schipper; Libby Lenton	United States (USA); Margaret Hoelzer; Tara Kirk; Rachel Komisarz; Maritza Correia	China (CHN); Gao Chang; Luo Nan; Zhou Yafei; Xu Yanwei
2008 Manchester	United States (USA); Margaret Hoelzer; Jessica Hardy; Rachel Komisarz; Kara Denby	Australia (AUS); Rachel Goh; Sarah Katsoulis; Felicity Galvez; Alice Mills	Great Britain (GBR); Elizabeth Simmonds; Kate Haywood; Jemma Lowe; Francesca Halsall
2010 Dubai	China (CHN); Zhao Jing; Zhao Jin; Liu Zige; Tang Yi	United States (USA); Natalie Coughlin; Rebecca Soni; Dana Vollmer; Jessica Hardy	Australia (AUS); Rachel Goh; Leisel Jones; Felicity Galvez; Marieke Guehrer
2012 Istanbul	Denmark (DEN); Mie Nielsen; Rikke Møller Pedersen; Jeanette Ottesen; Pernille Blume	Australia (AUS); Rachel Goh; Sarah Katsoulis; Marieke Guehrer; Angie Bainbridge	United States (USA); Olivia Smoliga; Jessica Hardy; Claire Donahue; Megan Romano
2014 Doha	Denmark (DEN); Mie Nielsen; Rikke Møller Pedersen; Jeanette Ottesen; Pernille Blume	Australia (AUS); Madison Wilson; Sally Hunter; Emily Seebohm; Bronte Campbell	Japan (JPN); Sayaka Akase; Kanako Watanabe; Rino Hosoda; Miki Uchida
2016 Windsor	United States (USA); Ali DeLoof; Lilly King; Kelsi Worrell; Mallory Comerford	Canada (CAN); Kylie Masse; Rachel Nicol; Katerine Savard; Penny Oleksiak	Australia (AUS); Emily Seebohm; Jessica Hansen; Emily Washer; Brittany Elmslie
2018 Hangzhou	United States (USA); Olivia Smoliga; Katie Meili; Kelsi Dahlia; Mallory Comerford	China (CHN); Fu Yuanhui; Shi Jinglin; Zhang Yufei; Zhu Menghui	Italy (ITA); Margherita Panziera; Martina Carraro; Elena Di Liddo; Federica Pellegrini
2021 Abu Dhabi	Sweden (SWE); Louise Hansson; Sophie Hansson; Sarah Sjöström; Michelle Coleman	Canada (CAN); Kylie Masse; Sydney Pickrem; Maggie Mac Neil; Kayla Sanchez	China (CHN); Peng Xuwei; Tang Qianting; Zhang Yufei; Cheng Yujie
2022 Melbourne	United States (USA); Claire Curzan; Lilly King; Torri Huske; Kate Douglass	Australia (AUS); Kaylee McKeown; Jenna Strauch; Emma McKeon; Meg Harris	Canada (CAN); Ingrid Wilm; Sydney Pickrem; Maggie Mac Neil; Taylor Ruck
2024 Budapest	United States (USA); Regan Smith; Lilly King; Gretchen Walsh; Kate Douglass	Great Britain (GBR); Abbie Wood; Angharad Evans; Eva Okaro; Freya Anderson	China (CHN); Qian Xinan; Tang Qianting; Chen Luying; Liu Shuhan

Rank	Nation	Gold	Silver	Bronze	Total
1	United States	5	5	4	14
2	Australia	3	6	3	12
3	China	3	1	4	8
4	Sweden	3		2	5
5	Denmark	2			2
6	Japan	1		1	2
7	Canada		3	1	4
8	Great Britain		1	1	2
9	Germany		1		1
10	Italy			1	1
Total		17	17	17	51

== 4 × 50 metre mixed freestyle relay ==
Year	Gold	Silver	Bronze
2014 Doha	United States (USA); Josh Schneider; Matt Grevers; Madison Kennedy; Abbey Weitzeil	Russia (RUS); Evgeny Sedov; Vladimir Morozov; Veronika Popova; Rozaliya Nasretdinova	Brazil (BRA); César Cielo; João de Lucca; Etiene Medeiros; Larissa Oliveira
2016 Windsor	Russia (RUS); Aleksei Brianskiy; Vladimir Morozov; Maria Kameneva; Rozaliya Nasretdinova	Netherlands (NED); Jesse Puts; Nyls Korstanje; Ranomi Kromowidjojo; Maaike de Waard	Canada (CAN); Yuri Kisil; Markus Thormeyer; Michelle Williams; Sandrine Mainville
2018 Hangzhou	United States (USA); Caeleb Dressel; Ryan Held; Mallory Comerford; Kelsi Dahlia	Netherlands (NED); Jesse Puts; Stan Pijnenburg; Ranomi Kromowidjojo; Femke Heemskerk	Russia (RUS); Vladimir Morozov; Evgeny Sedov; Maria Kameneva; Rozaliya Nasretdinova
2021 Abu Dhabi	Canada (CAN); Joshua Liendo; Yuri Kisil; Kayla Sanchez; Maggie Mac Neil	Netherlands (NED); Jesse Puts; Thom de Boer; Ranomi Kromowidjojo; Kira Toussaint	Russian Swimming Federation (RSF); Vladimir Morozov; Andrey Minakov; Maria Kameneva; Arina Surkova
2022 Melbourne	France (FRA); Maxime Grousset; Florent Manaudou; Béryl Gastaldello; Mélanie Henique	Australia (AUS); Kyle Chalmers; Matthew Temple; Meg Harris; Emma McKeon	Netherlands (NED); Kenzo Simons; Thom de Boer; Maaike de Waard; Marrit Steenbergen
2024 Budapest	Italy (ITA); Leonardo Deplano; Alessandro Miressi; Silvia Di Pietro; Sara Curtis	Canada (CAN); Ilya Kharun; Yuri Kisil; Ingrid Wilm; Mary-Sophie Harvey	Poland (POL); Piotr Ludwiczak; Kamil Sieradzki; Kornelia Fiedkiewicz; Katarzyna Wasick

Rank	Nation	Gold	Silver	Bronze	Total
1	United States	2			2
2	Russia	1	1	1	3
2	Canada	1	1	1	3
4	France	1			1
4	Italy	1			1
6	Netherlands		3	1	4
7	Australia		1		1
8	Brazil			1	1
8	RSF			1	1
8	Poland			1	1
Total		6	6	6	18

== 4 × 50 metre mixed medley relay ==
Year	Gold	Silver	Bronze
2014 Doha	Brazil (BRA); Etiene Medeiros; Felipe França Silva; Nicholas Santos; Larissa Oliveira	Great Britain (GBR); Chris Walker-Hebborn; Adam Peaty; Siobhan-Marie O'Connor; Francesca Halsall	Italy (ITA); Niccolo Bonacchi; Fabio Scozzoli; Silvia Di Pietro; Erika Ferraioli
2016 Windsor	United States (USA); Tom Shields; Lilly King; Kelsi Worrell; Michael Chadwick	Brazil (BRA); Etiene Medeiros; Felipe Lima; Nicholas Santos; Larissa Oliveira	Japan (JPN); Junya Koga; Yoshiki Yamanaka; Rikako Ikee; Sayuki Ouchi
2018 Hangzhou	United States (USA); Olivia Smoliga; Michael Andrew; Kelsi Dahlia; Caeleb Dressel	Netherlands (NED); Jesse Puts; Ties Elzerman; Ranomi Kromowidjojo; Femke Heemskerk	Russia (RUS); Kliment Kolesnikov; Oleg Kostin; Rozaliya Nasretdinova; Maria Kameneva
2021 Abu Dhabi	Netherlands (NED); Kira Toussaint; Arno Kamminga; Thom de Boer; Ranomi Kromowidjojo	United States (USA); Shaine Casas; Nic Fink; Claire Curzan; Abbey Weitzeil	Italy (ITA); Lorenzo Mora; Nicolò Martinenghi; Elena Di Liddo; Silvia Di Pietro
2022 Melbourne	United States (USA); Ryan Murphy; Nic Fink; Kate Douglass; Torri Huske	Italy (ITA); Lorenzo Mora; Nicolo Martinenghi; Silvia di Pietro; Costanza Cocconcelli	Canada (CAN); Kylie Masse; Javier Acevedo; Ilya Kharun; Maggie Mac Neil
2024 Budapest	Neutral Athletes B (NAB); Miron Lifintsev; Kirill Prigoda; Arina Surkova; Daria Trofimova	Canada (CAN); Kylie Masse; Finlay Knox; Ilya Kharun; Ingrid Wilm	United States (USA); Shaine Casas; Michael Andrew; Regan Smith; Katharine Berkoff

Rank	Nation	Gold	Silver	Bronze	Total
1	United States	3	1	1	5
2	Brazil	1	1		2
2	Netherlands	1	1		2
4	Neutral Athletes B	1			1
5	Italy		1	2	3
6	Canada		1	1	2
7	Great Britain		1		1
8	Japan			1	1
8	Russia			1	1
Total		6	6	6	18

== 4 × 100 metre mixed medley relay ==
Year	Gold	Silver	Bronze
2024 Budapest	Neutral Athletes B (NAB); Miron Lifintsev; Kirill Prigoda; Arina Surkova; Daria Klepikova	United States (USA); Regan Smith; Lilly King; Dare Rose; Jack Alexy	Canada (CAN); Ingrid Wilm; Finlay Knox; Ilya Kharun; Mary-Sophie Harvey

Rank	Nation	Gold	Silver	Bronze	Total
1	Neutral Athletes B	1			1
2	United States		1		1
3	Canada			1	1
Total		1	1	1	3

== See also ==
- List of World Swimming Championships (25 m) medalists (men)
