= Sweden at the World Aquatics Championships =

- Flag of Sweden
- World Aquatics code: SWE
- National federation: Svenska Simidrott
- Website: www.svensksimidrott.se
- Medals Ranked 13th: Gold 19 Silver 20 Bronze 17 Total 56

World Aquatics Championships appearances (overview)
- 1973; 1975; 1978; 1982; 1986; 1991; 1994; 1998; 2001; 2003; 2005; 2007; 2009; 2011; 2013; 2015; 2017; 2019; 2022; 2023; 2024; 2025

Sweden has participated in all World Aquatics Championships since the beginning in 1973.

== Medalists ==
Medal	Name	Year	Sport	Event
Gold	Ulrika Knape	1973 Belgrade	Diving	Women's 10 m platform
Gold	Gunnar Larsson	1973 Belgrade	Swimming	Men's 200 m individual medley
Silver	Ulrika Knape	1973 Belgrade	Diving	Women's 3 m springboard
Bronze	Bengt Gingsjö	1973 Belgrade	Swimming	Men's 400 m freestyle
Bronze	Ulrika Knape	1975 Cali	Diving	Women's 10 m platform
Bronze	Pär Arvidsson	1978 West Berlin	Swimming	Men's 100 m butterfly
Bronze	Per Holmertz; Dan Larsson; Per-Alvar Magnusson; Per-Ola Quist	1978 West Berlin	Swimming	Men's 4x100 m freestyle relay
Bronze	Per Johansson	1982 Guayaquil	Swimming	Men's 100 m freestyle
Bronze	Bengt Baron	1982 Guayaquil	Swimming	Men's 100 m butterfly
Bronze	Bengt Baron; Per Holmertz; Per Johansson; Per Wikström	1982 Guayaquil	Swimming	Men's 4x100 m freestyle relay
Silver	Tommy Werner	1991 Perth	Swimming	Men's 100 m freestyle
Gold	Anders Holmertz; Lars Frölander; Christer Wallin; Tommy Werner	1994 Rome	Swimming	Men's 4x200 m freestyle relay
Silver	Anders Holmertz	1994 Rome	Swimming	Men's 200 m freestyle
Silver	Lars Frölander	1994 Rome	Swimming	Men's 100 m butterfly
Silver	Lars Frölander	1998 Perth	Swimming	Men's 100 m butterfly
Bronze	Lars Frölander	1998 Perth	Swimming	Men's 100 m freestyle
Gold	Lars Frölander	2001 Fukuoka	Swimming	Men's 100 m butterfly
Silver	Therese Alshammar	2001 Fukuoka	Swimming	Women's 50 m freestyle
Silver	Therese Alshammar	2001 Fukuoka	Swimming	Women's 50 m butterfly
Silver	Lars Frölander	2001 Fukuoka	Swimming	Men's 50 m butterfly
Bronze	Lars Frölander	2001 Fukuoka	Swimming	Men's 100 m freestyle
Bronze	Anna-Karin Kammerling	2001 Fukuoka	Swimming	Women's 50 m butterfly
Bronze	Anna-Karin Kammerling	2003 Barcelona	Swimming	Women's 50 m butterfly
Silver	Anna-Karin Kammerling	2005 Montreal	Swimming	Women's 50 m butterfly
Bronze	Therese Alshammar	2005 Montreal	Swimming	Women's 50 m butterfly
Bronze	Josefin Lillhage	2005 Montreal	Swimming	Women's 200 m freestyle
Gold	Therese Alshammar	2007 Melbourne	Swimming	Women's 50 m butterfly
Silver	Therese Alshammar	2007 Melbourne	Swimming	Women's 50 m freestyle
Bronze	Stefan Nystrand	2007 Melbourne	Swimming	Men's 50 m freestyle
Gold	Sarah Sjöström	2009 Rome	Swimming	Women's 100 m butterfly
Silver	Therese Alshammar	2009 Rome	Swimming	Women's 50 m freestyle
Gold	Therese Alshammar	2011 Shanghai	Swimming	Women's 50 m freestyle
Silver	Therese Alshammar	2011 Shanghai	Swimming	Women's 50 m butterfly
Gold	Sarah Sjöström	2013 Barcelona	Swimming	Women's 100 m butterfly
Silver	Sarah Sjöström	2013 Barcelona	Swimming	Women's 100 m freestyle
Gold	Sarah Sjöström	2015 Kazan	Swimming	Women's 100 m butterfly
Gold	Sarah Sjöström	2015 Kazan	Swimming	Women's 50 m butterfly
Gold	Jennie Johansson	2015 Kazan	Swimming	Women's 50 m breaststroke
Silver	Sarah Sjöström	2015 Kazan	Swimming	Women's 100 m freestyle
Silver	Michelle Coleman; Jennie Johansson; Sarah Sjöström; Louise Hansson	2015 Kazan	Swimming	Women's 4×100 m medley relay
Bronze	Sarah Sjöström	2015 Kazan	Swimming	Women's 50 m freestyle
Gold	Sarah Sjöström	2017 Budapest	Swimming	Women's 100 m butterfly
Gold	Sarah Sjöström	2017 Budapest	Swimming	Women's 50 m butterfly
Gold	Sarah Sjöström	2017 Budapest	Swimming	Women's 50 m freestyle
Silver	Sarah Sjöström	2017 Budapest	Swimming	Women's 100 m freestyle

== Medal tables ==
=== By championships ===
Games	Gold	Silver	Bronze	Total
1973 Belgrade	2	1	1	4
1975 Cali	0	0	1	1
1978 West Berlin	0	0	2	2
1982 Guayaquil	0	0	3	3
1986 Madrid	0	0	0	0
1991 Perth	0	1	0	1
1994 Rome	1	2	0	3
1998 Perth	0	1	1	2
2001 Fukuoka	1	3	2	6
2003 Barcelona	0	0	1	1
2005 Montreal	0	1	2	3
2007 Melbourne	1	1	1	3
2009 Rome	1	1	0	2
2011 Shanghai	1	1	0	2
2013 Barcelona	1	1	0	2
2015 Kazan	3	2	1	6
2017 Budapest	3	1	0	4
2019 Gwangju	1	2	2	5
2022 Budapest	2	2	0	4
2023 Fukuoka	2	0	0	2
2024 Doha	2	1	1	4
2025 Singapore	0	0	0	0
Totals (22 entries)	21	21	18	60

=== By sport ===
Name	Gold	Silver	Bronze	Total
Swimming	20	20	17	57
Diving	1	1	1	3
Totals (2 entries)	21	21	18	60

=== By athlete ===
Name	Gold	Silver	Bronze	Total
Sarah Sjöström	14	8	3	25
Therese Alshammar	2	5	1	8
Lars Frölander	2	3	2	7
Ulrika Knape	1	1	1	3
Louise Hansson	0	2	1	3
Anna-Karin Kammerling	0	1	2	3
Totals (6 entries)	19	20	10	49

Only athletes with more than three medals
