= Swimming at the 2005 World Aquatics Championships – Women's 50 metre butterfly =

Women's 50m Butterfly at the 2005 FINA World Aquatics Championships
- Dates: 29 July (prelims and semifinals); 30 July (final)
- Competitors: 69 from 47 nations
- Winning time: 26.11 seconds

Medalists
| gold medal | Danni Miatke | Australia |
| silver medal | Anna-Karin Kammerling | Sweden |
| bronze medal | Therese Alshammar | Sweden |

The Women's 50 Butterfly event at the 11th FINA World Aquatics Championships swam 29 – 30 July 2005 in Montreal, Canada. Preliminary and Semifinals heats were held on 29 July. The Final was held on 30 July.

At the start of the event, the existing World (WR) and Championships (CR) records were:

- WR: 25.57 swum by Anna-Karin Kammerling (Sweden) on 30 July 2002 in Berlin, Germany
- CR: 25.84 swum by Inge de Bruijn (Netherlands) on 26 July 2003 in Barcelona, Spain

== Results ==
=== Preliminaries ===
| Rank | Heat + Lane | Swimmer | Nation | Time | Notes |
|---|---|---|---|---|---|
| 1 | H8 L8 | Natalie Coughlin | United States | 26.50 | q |
| 2 | H8 L4 | Danni Miatke | Australia | 26.56 | q |
| 3 | H9 L4 | Therese Alshammar | Sweden | 26.63 | q |
| 4 | H7 L5 | Fabienne Nadarajah | Austria | 26.70 | q |
| 5 | H8 L3 | Anna-Karin Kammerling | Sweden | 26.89 | q |
| 6 | H6 L4 | Elizabeth Coster | New Zealand | 27.01 | q |
| 7 | H7 L4 | Inge Dekker | Netherlands | 27.05 | q |
| 8 | H7 L6 | Elena Gemo | Italy | 27.13 | q |
| 9 | H9 L5 | Alice Mills | Australia | 27.15 | q |
| 10 | H9 L2 | Marilies Demal | Austria | 27.18 | q |
| 11 | H8 L6 | ZHOU Yafei | China | 27.19 | q |
| 11 | H9 L3 | Antje Buschschulte | Germany | 27.19 | q |
| 13 | H9 L6 | Martina Moravcová | Slovakia | 27.23 | q |
| 14 | H8 L5 | Chantal Groot | Netherlands | 27.30 | q |
| 15 | H9 L1 | Triin Aljand | Estonia | 27.31 | q |
| 16 | H7 L3 | Aleksandra Urbanczyk | Poland | 27.34 | swim off |
| 16 | H L | Vasilisa Vladykina | Russia | 27.34 | q, swim off |
| 18 | H7 L1 | Rachel Komisarz | United States | 27.44 | |
| 19 | H8 L7 | Georgina Toomey | New Zealand | 27.48 | |
| 20 | H6 L8 | Jeanette Ottesen | Denmark | 27.49 | |
| 20 | H9 L7 | Ayako Doi | Japan | 27.49 | |
| 22 | H8 L1 | Kelly Stefanyshyn | Canada | 27.57 | |
| 23 | H6 L3 | Mandy Loots | South Africa | 27.67 | |
| 23 | H6 L6 | Denisa Smolenová | Slovakia | 27.67 | |
| 25 | H6 L5 | Lyubov Korol | Ukraine | 27.68 | |
| 26 | H8 L2 | Ángela San Juan | Spain | 27.80 | |
| 27 | H5 L4 | Heather Brand | Zimbabwe | 27.83 | |
| 28 | H7 L7 | Natalia Sutiagina | Russia | 27.87 | |
| 29 | H6 L1 | SZE Hang Yu | Hong Kong | 28.07 | |
| 30 | H7 L8 | Joscelin Yeo | Singapore | 28.11 | |
| 31 | H6 L2 | Chanelle Van Wyk | South Africa | 28.15 | |
| 32 | H5 L7 | Hannah Wilson | Hong Kong | 28.25 | |
| 33 | H9 L8 | Carla Stampfli | Switzerland | 28.32 | |
| 34 | H4 L3 | Yamilé Bahamonde | Ecuador | 28.33 | |
| 34 | H6 L7 | Jennifer Carroll | Canada | 28.33 | |
| 36 | H5 L2 | Yurie Yano | Japan | 28.62 | |
| 37 | H5 L6 | LIU Zige | China | 28.74 | |
| 38 | H5 L3 | Irina Shlemova | Uzbekistan | 28.77 | |
| 39 | H5 L5 | Annette Hansen | Denmark | 28.78 | |
| 40 | H4 L5 | Ashley Aitken | Bermuda | 29.18 | |
| 41 | H4 L7 | Hae Ri Cha | South Korea | 29.28 | |
| 42 | H4 L4 | Carolina Colorado Henao | Colombia | 29.33 | |
| 43 | H4 L2 | Fatima Valderrama | Peru | 29.57 | |
| 44 | H5 L1 | Bernadette Lee | Singapore | 29.59 | |
| 45 | H4 L1 | Cheok Mei Ma | Macau | 29.76 | |
| 46 | H5 L8 | Alia Atkinson | Jamaica | 29.80 | |
| 47 | H4 L8 | Angela Galea | Malta | 29.84 | |
| 48 | H3 L8 | Ellen Hight | Zambia | 29.88 | |
| 49 | H3 L2 | Ileana Ivette Murillo Argueta | El Salvador | 30.12 | |
| 50 | H3 L3 | Melissa Vincent | Mauritius | 30.13 | |
| 51 | H3 L5 | Sharon Fajardo | Honduras | 30.15 | |
| 52 | H4 L6 | Binta Zahra Diop | Senegal | 30.24 | |
| 53 | H3 L6 | Ana Hernandez Duarte | El Salvador | 30.27 | |
| 53 | H3 L1 | Davina Mangion | Malta | 30.27 | |
| 55 | H2 L7 | Anna Liza Mopio Jane | Papua New Guinea | 30.47 | |
| 56 | H2 L4 | Khadija Ciss | Senegal | 30.64 | |
| 56 | H2 L3 | Nicole Marmol | Ecuador | 30.64 | |
| 58 | H3 L7 | Weng I Kuan | Macau | 31.04 | |
| 59 | H2 L6 | Jonay Briedenhann | Namibia | 31.31 | |
| 60 | H2 L5 | Lenient Obia | Nigeria | 31.59 | |
| 61 | H2 L1 | Jakie Wellman | Zambia | 31.67 | |
| 62 | H2 L2 | Sana Wahid | Pakistan | 32.40 | |
| 63 | H2 L8 | Jessica Vieira | Mozambique | 32.42 | |
| 64 | H1 L5 | Aminath Rouya | Maldives | 33.60 | |
| 65 | H1 L3 | Debra Daniel | (Federated States of Micronesia) Micronesia | 33.87 | |
| -- | H3 L4 | Phan Thi Hanh | Vietnam | DQ | |
| -- | -- | Lasm Quissoh Genevieve Meledje | Ivory Coast | DNS | |
| -- | -- | Anifath Okanla | Benin | DNS | |
| -- | -- | Eliane Droubry Dohi | Ivory Coast | DNS | |

Swim-off for 16th place

1. Vasilisa Vladykina (Russia) -- 27.14
2. Aleksandra Urbanczyk (Poland) -- 27.22

=== Semifinals ===
| Rank | Heat + Lane | Swimmer | Nation | Time | Notes |
|---|---|---|---|---|---|
| 1 | S1 L4 | Danni Miatke | Australia | 26.30 | q |
| 2 | S1 L5 | Fabienne Nadarajah | Austria | 26.51 | q |
| 3 | S2 L3 | Anna-Karin Kammerling | Sweden | 26.71 | q |
| 4 | S2 L6 | Inge Dekker | Netherlands | 26.87 | q |
| 5 | S1 L7 | Antje Buschschulte | Germany | 26.91 | q |
| 5 | S2 L4 | Natalie Coughlin | USA | 26.91 | q |
| 7 | S2 L5 | Therese Alshammar | Sweden | 26.98 | q |
| 8 | S1 L3 | Elizabeth Coster | New Zealand | 27.10 | q |
| 9 | S1 L1 | Chantal Groot | Netherlands | 27.13 | |
| 10 | S2 L2 | Alice Mills | Australia | 27.15 | |
| 11 | S2 L7 | ZHOU Yafei | China | 27.20 | |
| 12 | S1 L6 | Elena Gemo | Italy | 27.27 | |
| 13 | S2 L1 | Martina Moravcová | Slovakia | 27.30 | |
| 14 | S1 L2 | Marilies Demal | Austria | 27.34 | |
| 15 | S2 L8 | Triin Aljand | Estonia | 27.37 | |
| 16 | S1 L8 | Vasilisa Vladykina | Russia | 27.52 | |

=== Final ===
| Place | Swimming | Nation | Time | Notes |
|---|---|---|---|---|
| 1 | Danni Miatke | Australia | 26.11 | |
| 2 | Anna-Karin Kammerling | Sweden | 26.36 | |
| 3 | Therese Alshammar | Sweden | 26.39 | |
| 4 | Fabienne Nadarajah | Austria | 26.50 | |
| 5 | Antje Buschschulte | Germany | 26.55 | |
| 6 | Natalie Coughlin | USA | 26.63 | |
| 6 | Inge Dekker | Netherlands | 26.93 | |
| 8 | Elizabeth Coster | New Zealand | 27.23 | |
