= Ben Michaelson =

American swimmer (born 1981)

Personal information
- Full name: Benjamin Michaelson
- Nationality: United States
- Born: November 13, 1981 (age 44) Seymour, Connecticut, U.S.

Sport
- Sport: Swimming
- Strokes: Butterfly
- College team: Southern Connecticut State University
Medal record
Men's Swimming
Representing United States
Pan American Games
Gold medal – first place	2003 Santo Domingo	100m butterfly
Gold medal – first place	2003 Santo Domingo	4x100m medley

Benjamin Michaelson (born November 13, 1981) is a swimmer hailing from Seymour, Connecticut. He attended Seymour High School, later continuing his education and career at Southern Connecticut State University under head coach Timothy Quill and assistant coach CJ Moran. After college, he continued swimming at the SoNoCo swim club out of SCSU and later Club Wolverine. In 2003, he was ranked 11th in the world for the men's 100 long course meter fly, his time of 52.76 tied him for third on the all-time top times for Americans. In 2004, he placed 3rd in the 100 m fly behind Ian Crocker and Michael Phelps at the US Olympic Trials. He officially retired after in the latter months 2005, citing a need to move on with his life.

== Top times ==
- 50 y freestyle- 19.4 (NCAA Division II record)
- 100 y freestyle- 43.33 (NCAA Division II record)
- 100 y fly- 45.60 (NCAA Division II record)
- 50 m free- 23.41
- 100 m free- 51.53
- 100 m fly- 52.76

== Awards ==
- 2003 NCAA Division II swimmer of the year
- 2003 Connecticut SportsWriters Alliance Bill Lee Award
- 2002 and 2003 Metropolitan Conference Swimmer of the Year
