= Swimming at the 2003 Pan American Games – Men's 4 × 100 metre medley relay =

The Men's 4 × 100 m Medley Relay event at the 2003 Pan American Games took place on August 17, 2003 (Day 16 of the Games).

== Medalists ==
Gold	Peter Marshall; Mark Gangloff; Ben Michaelson; Nick Brunelli; United States
Silver	Paulo Machado; Eduardo Fischer; Kaio de Almeida; Gustavo Borges; Brazil
Bronze	Sean Sepulis; Scott Dickens; Chad Murray; Matt Rose; Canada

== Records ==
Record	Nation	Time	Date	Venue
World Record	United States	3:31.54	2003-07-27	Barcelona, Spain
Pan Am Record	Brazil	3:40.27	1999-08-07	Winnipeg, Canada

== Results ==
Place	Nation	Swimmers	Heats		Final
Place	Nation	Swimmers	Time	Rank	Time
1	United States	♦ Peter Marshall ♦ Mark Gangloff ♦ Ben Michaelson ♦ Nick Brunelli	3:40.77	1	3:37.27 GR
2	Brazil	♦ Paulo Machado ♦ Eduardo Fischer ♦ Kaio Almeida ♦ Gustavo Borges	3:52.42	4	3:40.02 SA
3	Canada	♦ Sean Sepulis ♦ Scott Dickens ♦ Chad Murray ♦ Matt Rose	3:51.52	2	3:40.12
4	Mexico	♦ ♦ ♦ ♦	3:53.26	5	3:45.34
5	Puerto Rico	♦ ♦ ♦ ♦	3:52.20	3	3:48.11
6	Barbados	♦ ♦ ♦ ♦	3:58.15	8	3:51.98
7	Bahamas	♦ Chris Vythoulkas ♦ Travano McPhee ♦ Jeremy Knowles ♦ Kristoph Carey	3:57.44	7	3:53.57 NR
8	Virgin Islands	♦ George Gleason ♦ Kevin Hensley ♦ S Hensley ♦ Josh Laban	3:56.07	6	3:55.00 NR
9	Dominican Republic	♦ ♦ ♦ ♦	3:59.75	9	
