= Danni Miatke =

Australian swimmer

Personal information
- Full name: Danni Miatke
- Nationality: Australia
- Born: 29 November 1987 (age 38) Darwin, Northern Territory, Australia

Sport
- Sport: Swimming
- Strokes: Freestyle, butterfly
Medal record
Women's swimming
Representing Australia
World Championships (LC)
Gold medal – first place	2005 Montreal	50 m butterfly
Gold medal – first place	2007 Melbourne	4×100 m freestyle
Silver medal – second place	2007 Melbourne	50 m butterfly
World Championships (SC)
Gold medal – first place	2006 Shanghai	4×100 m medley
Silver medal – second place	2004 Indianapolis	4×200m freestyle
Silver medal – second place	2006 Shanghai	4×100m freestyle
Bronze medal – third place	2004 Indianapolis	4×100m freestyle
Bronze medal – third place	2004 Indianapolis	4×100m medley
Commonwealth Games
Gold medal – first place	2006 Melbourne	50 m butterfly

Danni Miatke (born 29 November 1987) is an Australian swimmer.

== Biography ==
Born in Darwin, Northern Territory in 1987, Miatke began competitive swimming in 1995. She first represented the Northern Territory in 1998 at the national School Sport Swimming and Diving Championships. She first won gold for the Territory in 1999 at the Australian Age Championships, in the 100 metres backstroke in the under-13 division.

Miatke moved to Melbourne, Victoria in 2002 to pursue a career in professional swimming. Until the end of 2005, she was a student at Carey Baptist Grammar School in the Melbourne suburb of Kew.

In 2002 Miatke was the winner of the NT Junior Sports Person of the Year Award and 2006 the winner of the NT Sports Person of the Year Award. In 2004, she was named the Fisher & Paykel Female Youth Swimmer of Year by Swimming Australia. Other awards include the 2002 Northern Territory Institute of Sport National Athlete of the Year and 2006 Northern Territory Young Achievers Sports Award, 2006 and 2007 Victorian Junior Female Athlete of the Year, also in 2006, Miatke was a finalist in the Northern Territory for the Young Australian of the Year Award.

At the 2004 FINA Short Course World Championships in Indianapolis, United States, Miatke won silver in the 4 × 200 metre freestyle relay, and bronze in both the 4 × 100 metre freestyle relay and 4 × 100 metre medley relay. Her best individual result at the meet was thirteenth in the 200 metre freestyle. The 2005 World Aquatics Championships in Montreal, Quebec, Canada were Miatke's first international long-course meet. She won gold in the 50 metres butterfly in Commonwealth record time, ahead of world record holder Anna-Karin Kammerling from Sweden.

In 2006, Miatke won the 50 metres butterfly at the Telstra Commonwealth Games Trials and finished fifth in the 100 metres, qualifying for the Australian Commonwealth Games team. At the 2006 Commonwealth Games, in her adopted home town of Melbourne, Miatke won gold in the 50 metres butterfly.

== Personal bests ==
=== Long course ===
- 50 m butterfly: 26.05s (Commonwealth record)
- 100 m butterfly: 59.98s
- 100 m freestyle: 56.14s

== See also ==
- List of World Aquatics Championships medalists in swimming (women)
- List of Commonwealth Games medallists in swimming (women)
- Commonwealth Games records in swimming
