= Nick Brunelli =

American swimmer (born 1981)

Personal information
- Full name: Nicolas James Brunelli
- Nationality: USA
- Born: December 18, 1981 (age 44) Norwood, Massachusetts, U.S.

Sport
- Sport: Swimming
- Event: Freestyle relays
- Strokes: Freestyle
- Club: Ocean State Squids S.C.
- College team: Arizona State University
- Coach: Michael Chasson (ASU)
Medal record
Representing the United States
World Championships (SC)
Gold medal – first place	2004 Indianapolis	4x100 m freestyle
Bronze medal – third place	2004 Indianapolis	50 m freestyle
Bronze medal – third place	2006 Shanghai	4x100 m freestyle
Bronze medal – third place	2006 Shanghai	4x200 m freestyle
Pan American Games
Gold medal – first place	2003 Santo Domingo	4x100 m medley

Nicholas James Brunelli (born December 18, 1981) is an American freestyle swimmer from Norwood, Massachusetts, who competed for Arizona State University and won the gold medal in the men's 4 × 100 m medley relay event at the 2003 Pan American Games setting a PanAm record of 3:27.27. He had been an American Record holder in the 50 freestyle in short course meters format.

Brunelli was born December 18, 1981 in Norwood, Massachusetts the younger of two brothers to John and Cynthia Brunelli. He attended Mansfield High School in Mansfield, Massachusetts, graduating in 2000. In High School, he swam and trained with the Ocean State Squids Swim Club. During his High School career, at the Speedo Junior Northeast Championships in 1999, he placed first in the 100 and the 50 freestyle events and at the 2000 Speedo Northeast Championships, he placed first in the 100 and 200 freestyle. He qualified to participate in the 500 and 200 freestyle at the 2000 Olympic Trials, but did not make the U.S. team.

== Arizona State University ==
In college, he swam for Arizona State University from around 2001-2004 under Coach Michael Chasson who coached both the men's and women's teams from 1998–2009, one of the few coaches to manage both the men and women. During Brunelli's tenure with the team under Coach Chasson, Arizona State men's swimming finished in the NCAA top 20 all four years from 2001-2004 and in the top fifteen from 2001-2003. Brunelli majored in recreation at Arizona State. By 2003, he had distinguished himself as one of Arizona State's best freestyle swimmers. He received honors as an All-American six times at ASU, with highest All American first-team honors in the 100 free and 200 freestyle relay. At the NCAA championships in 2003, he placed fifth with a time of 42.93 in the 100 freestyle, recorded as ASU's second fastest time in team history. He swam a 50 freestyle time that became ASU's second fastest of all time with a 19.58 in the opening leg of the 4x500 NCAA freestyle relay.

=== World Championships ===
As indicated in Burnell's Medal Record heading at the bottom of his information box at left, at the 2004 and 2006 World Championships competition in Indianapolis and Shanghai, he secured a gold and three bronze medals. He won a gold medal in the 4x100 meter freestyle and a bronze in the 50 meter free in 2004, as well as 2 bronze medals in 2006 in the 4x100 and 4x200 meter freestyle events.

== See also ==
- Pan American Games records in swimming

== Sources ==
- Profile
- Nick Brunelli at Swimrankings.net
