= Kellie McMillan =

Australian swimmer

Personal information
- Full name: Kellie McMillan
- Nationality: Australia
- Born: 29 December 1977 (age 48) Warrnambool, Victoria, Australia

Sport
- Sport: Swimming
Medal record
Short Course Worlds
Bronze medal – third place	1999 Hong Kong	50m back
Bronze medal – third place	2000 Athens	50m back

Kellie McMillan Snowdon (born 29 December 1977 in Warrnambool, Victoria, Australia) is a former Australian backstroke swimmer.

McMillan won back-to-back bronze in the 50m backstroke event at the 1999 and 2000 Short Course Worlds.

As of June 2010, she is now Kellie Snowdon and she is the CEO of Swimming Victoria, one of the state associations of Swimming Australia. Previously, she had served as their Education and Training Coordinator.
