= Lu Donghua =

Chinese swimmer

Personal information
- Born: January 19, 1982 (age 44)

Sport
- Sport: Swimming
- Strokes: Backstroke
Medal record
Representing China
World Championships (SC)
Gold medal – first place	1997 Gothenburg	100m backstroke
Gold medal – first place	1997 Gothenburg	4x100m medley relay

Lu Donghua (卢东华; born 19 January 1982) is a Chinese former backstroke swimmer who competed in the 2000 Summer Olympics.
