= Lara Carroll =

Australian swimmer

Personal information
- Nickname: Lara Carroll
- National team: Australia
- Born: 8 December 1986 (age 39) Cambridge, England
- Height: 1.67 m (5 ft 6 in)
- Weight: 55 kg (121 lb)

Sport
- Sport: Swimming
- Strokes: Medley
- Club: Fremantle Port SC
Medal record
Women's swimming
Representing Australia
World Championships - Long Course
Bronze medal – third place	2005 Montreal	200 m medley
World Championships - Short Course
Silver medal – second place	2004 Indianapolis	200 m medley
Bronze medal – third place	2004 Indianapolis	400 m medley
Bronze medal – third place	2006 Shanghai	200 m medley
Commonwealth Games
Bronze medal – third place	2006 Melbourne	200 m medley

Lara Carroll (born 8 December 1986), also known by her married name Lara Mist, is an English-born competition swimmer who has represented Australia in international events, including the 2004 Summer Olympics.

She attended Leeming Senior High School in the suburb of Leeming.

Carroll made her international debut at the 2004 Summer Olympics in Athens, where she finished 6th in the 200 m individual medley. She claimed her first international medals later that year at the 2004 FINA Short Course World Championships in Indianapolis, claiming silver and bronze in the 200-metre and 400-metre individual medley respectively. She claimed her first long-course medal at the 2005 World Aquatics Championships, claiming a bronze in the 200-metre individual medley. She also came fourth in the 400-metre event.

Carroll is a member of the Australian Commonwealth Swimming Team at the 2006 Commonwealth Games in Melbourne, where she won a bronze medal in the 200-metre individual medley, finishing behind Stephanie Rice and Brooke Hanson, in a time of 2:13.86. She didn't compete in the 400-metre event due to illness.

She is a student and a member of the Fremantle Port swimming club.

In May 2014, she married her long-time partner Sam Mist in a ceremony at Rottnest Island.
