= 2000 FINA World Swimming Championships (25 m) =

- Host city: Athens
- Country: Greece
- Opening: 16 March 2000
- Closing: 19 March 2000
- Main venue: OAKA

The 5th FINA World Swimming Championships (25 m) were held at the Olympic Aquatic Centre in Athens, Greece from 16 to 19 March 2000. 15 world records were set.

== Men's events ==
Event	Gold		Silver		Bronze	
50 m freestyle	Mark Foster; Great Britain	21.58	Brendon Dedekind; South Africa	21.62	Stefan Nystrand; Sweden	21.80
100 m freestyle	Lars Frölander; Sweden	46.80	Stefan Nystrand; Sweden	47.73	Scott Tucker; United States	47.82
200 m freestyle	Bela Szabados; Hungary	1:45.27	Massimiliano Rosolino; Italy	1:45.63	Chad Carvin; United States	1:45.79
400 m freestyle	Chad Carvin; United States	3:41.13	Paul Palmer; Great Britain	3:42.70	Massimiliano Rosolino; Italy	3:43.68
1500 m freestyle	Jörg Hoffmann; Germany	14:47.57	Igor Chervynskyi; Ukraine	14:48.20	Chad Carvin; United States	14:51.23
50 m backstroke	Neil Walker; United States	23.99	Lenny Krayzelburg; United States	24.24	Rodolfo Falcón; Cuba	24.32
100 m backstroke	Neil Walker; United States	50.75; WR	Rodolfo Falcón; Cuba	52.87	Derya Büyükuncu; Turkey	52.88
200 m backstroke	Gordan Kožulj; Croatia	1:53.31	Brad Bridgewater; United States	1:53.87	Volodymyr Nikolaychuk; Ukraine	1:55.33
50 m breaststroke	Mark Warnecke; Germany	27.22	Brendon Dedekind; South Africa	27.27	Oleg Lisogor; Ukraine	27.30
100 m breaststroke	Roman Sloudnov; Russia	58.57	Zhu Yi; China	59.99	Roman Ivanovsky; Russia	1:00.05
200 m breaststroke	Roman Sloudnov; Russia	2:07.59; WR	Terence Parkin; South Africa	2:07.91	Andrei Ivanov; Russia	2:09.90
50 m butterfly	Mark Foster; Great Britain	23.30	Neil Walker; United States	23.46	Sabir Muhammad; United States	23.56
100 m butterfly	Lars Frölander; Sweden	50.44; WR	James Hickman; Great Britain	51.53	Denys Sylantyev; Ukraine	51.84
200 m butterfly	James Hickman; Great Britain	1:53.57	Shamek Pietucha; Canada	1:54.27	Anatoly Polyakov; Russia	1:54.47
100 m individual medley	Neil Walker; United States	52.79; WR	Jani Sievinen; Finland	54.08	James Hickman; Great Britain	54.38
200 m individual medley	Jani Sievinen; Finland	1:56.27	James Hickman; Great Britain	1:56.86	Massimiliano Rosolino; Italy	1:58.05
400 m individual medley	Jani Sievinen; Finland	4:09.54	Terence Parkin; South Africa	4:10.56	Michael Halika; Israel	4:10.90
4 × 100 m freestyle relay	Sweden; Johan Nyström; Lars Frölander; Mattias Ohlin; Stefan Nystrand	3:09.57; WR	United States; Scott Tucker; Josh Davis; Sabir Muhammad; Neil Walker	3:10.98	Germany; Mitja Zastrow; Stefan Herbst; Christian Tröger; Stephan Kunzelmann	3:13.69
4 × 200 m freestyle relay	United States; Josh Davis; Neil Walker; Scott Tucker; Chad Carvin	7:01.33; WR	Great Britain; Edward Sinclair; Marc Spackman; Paul Palmer; James Salter	7:03.06	Russia; Denis Pimankov; Anatoly Polyakov; Dmitri Chernychev; Andrey Kapralov	7:05.24
4 × 100 m medley relay	United States; Lenny Krayzelburg; Jarrod Marrs; Neil Walker; Scott Tucker	3:30.03	Germany; Sebastian Halgasch; Björn Nowakowski; Thomas Rupprath; Stefan Herbst	3:31.77	Great Britain; Neil Willey; Darren Mew; James Hickman; Paul Belk	3:32.08

Legend: WR: World record; CR: World Championships record

== Women's events ==
Event	Gold		Silver		Bronze	
50 m freestyle	Therese Alshammar; Sweden	23.59; WR	Sandra Völker; Germany	24.77	Alison Sheppard; Great Britain	24.80
100 m freestyle	Therese Alshammar; Sweden	52.17; WR	Jenny Thompson; United States	53.14	Martina Moravcová; Slovakia	53.88
200 m freestyle	Yang Yu; China	1:56.06	Martina Moravcová; Slovakia	1:56.46	Natalya Baranovskaya; Belarus	1:57.54
400 m freestyle	Lindsay Benko; United States	4:02.44	Yana Klochkova; Ukraine	4:04.39	Chen Hua; China	4:06.63
800 m freestyle	Chen Hua; China	8:17.03	Brooke Bennett; United States	8:19.66	Flavia Rigamonti; Switzerland	8:21.57
50 m backstroke	Antje Buschschulte; Germany	27.90	Marylyn Chiang; Canada	28.03	Kellie McMillan; Australia	28.06
100 m backstroke	Sandra Völker; Germany	58.66	Marylyn Chiang; Canada	59.33	Antje Buschschulte; Germany	59.37
200 m backstroke	Antje Buschschulte; Germany	2:07.29	Clementine Stoney; Australia	2:08.64	Lindsay Benko; United States	2:08.85
50 m breaststroke	Sarah Poewe; South Africa	30.66	Hao Ping; China	31.22	Tara Kirk; United States	31.47
100 m breaststroke	Sarah Poewe; South Africa	1:06.21	Alicja Pęczak; Poland	1:07.69	Yelena Bogomazova; Russia	1:08.27
200 m breaststroke	Rebecca Brown; Australia	2:23.41	Alicja Pęczak; Poland	2:24.24	Brooke Hanson; Australia	2:25.30
50 m butterfly	Jenny Thompson; United States	26.13	Anna-Karin Kammerling; Sweden	26.16	Nicola Jackson; Great Britain	26.85
100 m butterfly	Jenny Thompson; United States	57.67	Johanna Sjöberg; Sweden	57.96	Karen Campbell; United States	58.86
200 m butterfly	Mette Jacobsen; Denmark	2:08.10	Katrin Jaeke; Germany	2:09.42	Otylia Jędrzejczak; Poland	2:09.61
100 m individual medley	Martina Moravcová; Slovakia	59.71	Marianne Limpert; Canada	1:02.00	Alenka Kejžar; Slovenia	1:02.24
200 m individual medley	Yana Klochkova; Ukraine	2:08.97	Martina Moravcová; Slovakia	2:08.98	Marianne Limpert; Canada	2:12.68
400 m individual medley	Yana Klochkova; Ukraine	4:32.45	Nicole Hetzer; Germany	4:37.92	Katie Jo Yevak; United States	4:38.80
4 × 100 m freestyle relay	Sweden; Louise Jöhncke; Therese Alshammar; Anna-Karin Kammerling; Johanna Sjöberg	3:35.54	Germany; Katrin Meissner; Antje Buschschulte; Britta Steffen; Sandra Völker	3:37.31	Great Britain; Alison Sheppard; Claire Huddart; Karen Legg; Karen Pickering	3:37.93
4 × 200 m freestyle relay	Great Britain; Claire Huddart; Nicola Jackson; Karen Legg; Karen Pickering	7:49.11; WR	United States; Lindsay Benko; Brooke Bennett; Tammie Stone; Jenny Thompson	7:50.59	China; Sun Dan; Yang Lina; Li Jin; Yang Yu	7:52.70
4 × 100 m medley relay	Sweden; Therese Alshammar; Emma Igelström; Johanna Sjöberg; Anna-Karin Kammerling	3:59.53	Germany; Sandra Völker; Janne Schäfer; Katrin Jäke; Katrin Meissner	4:01.47	United States; Jamie Reid; Anita Nall; Jenny Thompson; Tammie Stone	4:02.51

Legend: WR: World record; CR: World Championships record

== Medal table ==
Rank	Nation	Gold	Silver	Bronze	Total
1	United States (USA)	9	7	8	24
2	Sweden (SWE)	7	3	1	11
3	Germany (GER)	5	6	2	13
4	Great Britain (GBR)	4	4	6	14
5	South Africa (RSA)	2	4	0	6
6	Ukraine (UKR)	2	2	3	7
7	China (CHN)	2	2	2	6
8	Finland (FIN)	2	1	0	3
9	Russia (RUS)	2	0	5	7
10	Slovakia (SVK)	1	2	1	4
11	Australia (AUS)	1	1	2	4
12	Croatia (CRO)	1	0	0	1
12	Denmark (DEN)	1	0	0	1
12	Hungary (HUN)	1	0	0	1
15	Canada (CAN)	0	4	1	5
16	Poland (POL)	0	2	1	3
17	Italy (ITA)	0	1	2	3
18	Cuba (CUB)	0	1	1	2
19	Belarus (BLR)	0	0	1	1
19	Israel (ISR)	0	0	1	1
19	Slovenia (SLO)	0	0	1	1
19	Switzerland (SUI)	0	0	1	1
19	Turkey (TUR)	0	0	1	1
Totals (23 entries)		40	40	40	120
