= Marylyn Chiang =

Canadian swimmer

Personal information
- Full name: Marylyn Chiang
- National team: Canada
- Born: 1977 (age 48–49)

Sport
- Sport: Swimming
- Strokes: Backstroke
- College team: University of California, Berkeley
Medal record
Women's swimming
Representing Canada
World Championships (SC)
Silver medal – second place	2000 Athens	50 m backstroke
Silver medal – second place	2000 Athens	100 m backstroke

Marylyn Chiang (born 1977) is a Canadian former swimmer who won two silver medals at the 2000 FINA Short Course World Championships in Athens, Greece. She has held Commonwealth, US Open, NCAA and Canadian records in backstroke and butterfly, including the Canadian 100m backstroke record for 9 years. In her collegiate career, she led a resurgence in University of California, Berkeley's swimming program, when she won the first NCAA title for the school in the sport in eleven years. In so doing, she set an NCAA record. Further, won the first of five consecutive Pacific-10 Conference female swimmer of the year honors for the Golden Bears in 1999. Haley Cope would win in 2000, and Natalie Coughlin three times in a row, from 2001 to 2003. In 2009, Marylyn was inducted in Cal Berkeley's Sports Hall of Fame.
