= 2004 FINA World Swimming Championships (25 m) =

7th World Swimming Championships (25 m)
- Host city: Indianapolis, Indiana, United States
- Date: October 7–11, 2004
- Venue: Conseco Fieldhouse

The 7th FINA Short Course World Championships were held at the Conseco Fieldhouse in Indianapolis, Indiana, United States from October 7 through October 11, 2004.

This was the only edition of the Short Course World Championships that Michael Phelps competed in. Phelps planned to swim in six races: the 200-meter freestyle, 200-meter butterfly, the individual medleys at 100 meters, 200 meters, and 400 meters, and the 4x200-meter freestyle relay. Phelps won gold in the 200-meter freestyle on October 7 - the only Short Course World Championships gold medal (and medal of any color) of his career - then withdrew from the rest of the meet the following day, citing a sore back.

== Results ==
=== Men's freestyle ===
Event	Gold		Silver		Bronze	
50 m	(United Kingdom) Mark Foster	21.58	(Sweden) Stefan Nystrand	21.66	(Brazil) Nicholas Santos (United States) Nick Brunelli	21.71
100 m	(United States) Jason Lezak	47.97	(Algeria) Salim Iles	48.07	(Canada) Rick Say	48.38
200 m	(United States) Michael Phelps	1:43.59	(Canada) Rick Say	1:44.39	(United States) Ryan Lochte	1:44.97
400 m	(Russia) Yuri Prilukov	3:40.79	(United States) Chad Carvin	3:43.77	(United States) Justin Mortimer	3:44.70
1500 m	(Russia) Yuri Prilukov	14:39.16	(Italy) Simone Ercoli	14:53.89	(Romania) Dragoş Coman	14:56.74
4 × 100 m	(United States) United States; Nick Brunelli; Neil Walker; Nate Dusing; Jason Lezak	3:09.96	(Brazil) Brazil; César Cielo; Thiago Pereira; Christiano Santos; Nicholas Santos	3:12.73	(Canada) Canada; Mike Mintenko; Matthew Rose; Adam Sioui; Rick Say	3:13.62
4 × 200 m	(United States) United States; Ryan Lochte; Chad Carvin; Dan Ketchum; Justin Mortimer	7:03.71	(Australia) Australia; Nicholas Sprenger; Andrew Mewing; Brendan Huges; Joshua Krogh	7:03.78	(Brazil) Brazil; Rodrigo Castro; Thiago Pereira; Rafael Mosca; Lucas Salatta	7:06.64

=== Women's freestyle ===
Event	Gold		Silver		Bronze	
50 m	(Netherlands) Marleen Veldhuis	24.41	(Australia) Libby Lenton	24.54	(Sweden) Therese Alshammar	24.63
100 m	(Australia) Libby Lenton	52.67	(Sweden) Josefin Lillhage	53.56	(Netherlands) Marleen Veldhuis	53.88
200 m	(Sweden) Josefin Lillhage	1:56.35	(United States) Lindsay Benko	1:56.48	(United States) Dana Vollmer	1:58.05
400 m	(United States) Kaitlin Sandeno	4:02.01	(United States) Sara McLarty	4:04.49	(Japan) Sachiko Yamada	4:04.64
800 m	(Japan) Sachiko Yamada	8:18.21	(United States) Kate Ziegler	8:20.55	(Australia) Melissa Gorman	8:25.38
4 × 100 m	(United States) United States; Amanda Weir; Kara Lynn Joyce; Lindsay Benko; Jenny Thompson	3:35.07	(Sweden) Sweden; Josefin Lillhage; Anna-Karin Kammerling; Johanna Sjöberg; Therese Alshammar	3:35.83	(Australia) Australia; Libby Lenton; Louise Tomlinson; Danni Miatke; Shayne Reese	3:36.18
4 × 200 m	(United States) United States; Dana Vollmer; Rachel Komisarz; Lindsay Benko; Kaitlin Sandeno	7:47.72	(Australia) Australia; Libby Lenton; Danni Miatke; Louise Tomlinson; Shayne Reese	7:51.39	(Sweden) Sweden; Ida Mattsson; Johanna Sjöberg; Josefin Lillhage; Petra Granlund	7:54.39

=== Men's Backstroke ===
Event	Gold		Silver		Bronze	
50 m	(Germany) Thomas Rupprath	23.51	(Australia) Matt Welsh	23.60	(United States) Peter Marshall	23.93
100 m	(United States) Aaron Peirsol	50.72 CR	(Australia) Matt Welsh	51.04	(Germany) Thomas Rupprath	51.20
200 m	(United States) Aaron Peirsol	1:50.52 WR	(Australia) Matt Welsh	1:52.54	(Russia) Arkady Vyatchanin	1:54.20

=== Women's Backstroke ===
Event	Gold		Silver		Bronze	
50 m	(United States) Haley Cope	27.49	(China) Gao Chang	27.55	(Australia) Sophie Edington	28.17
100 m	(United States) Haley Cope	59.03	(China) Gao Chang	59.61	(Australia) Sophie Edington	59.64
200 m	(United States) Margaret Hoelzer	2:05.84	(Australia) Tayliah Zimmer	2:08.05	(New Zealand) Melissa Ingram	2:08.54

=== Men's Breaststroke ===
Event	Gold		Silver		Bronze	
50 m	(United States) Brendan Hansen	26.86	(Australia) Brenton Rickard	27.09	(Sweden) Stefan Nystrand	27.28
100 m	(United States) Brendan Hansen	58.45	(Australia) Brenton Rickard	58.64	(Kazakhstan) Vladislav Polyakov	59.07
200 m	(United States) Brendan Hansen	2:04.98 CR	(Australia) Brenton Rickard	2:08.34	(Kazakhstan) Vladislav Polyakov	2:08.36

=== Women's Breaststroke ===
Event	Gold		Silver		Bronze	
50 m	(Australia) Brooke Hanson	30.20	(Australia) Jade Edmistone	30.21	(United States) Tara Kirk	30.61
100 m	(Australia) Brooke Hanson	1:05.36 CR	(Australia) Jade Edmistone	1:05.97	(United States) Tara Kirk	1:06.33
200 m	(Australia) Brooke Hanson	2:21.68	(United States) Amanda Beard	2:22.53	(Australia) Sarah Katsoulis	2:22.97

=== Men's Butterfly ===
Event	Gold		Silver		Bronze	
50 m	(United States) Ian Crocker	22.71 WR	(United Kingdom) Mark Foster	23.22	(Croatia) Duje Draganja	23.26
100 m	(United States) Ian Crocker	50.18 CR	(United Kingdom) James Hickman	51.13	(Slovenia) Peter Mankoč	51.66
200 m	(United Kingdom) James Hickman	1:53.41	(Romania) Ioan Gherghel	1:54.06	(China) Wu Peng	1:54.51

=== Women's Butterfly ===
Event	Gold		Silver		Bronze	
50 m	(United States) Jenny Thompson	25.89	(Sweden) Anna-Karin Kammerling	26.02	(Australia) Libby Lenton	26.53
100 m	(Slovakia) Martina Moravcová	57.38	(United States) Rachel Komisarz	57.85	(United States) Jenny Thompson	58.13
200 m	(United States) Kaitlin Sandeno	2:06.95	(United States) Mary Descenza	2:07.79	(Canada) Audrey Lacroix	2:08.35

=== Men's Medley ===
Event	Gold		Silver		Bronze	
100 m	(Slovenia) Peter Mankoč	52.66 CR	(Germany) Thomas Rupprath	53.35	(Brazil) Thiago Pereira	53.75
200 m	(Brazil) Thiago Pereira	1:55.78	(United States) Ryan Lochte	1:55.86	(Tunisia) Oussama Mellouli	1:56.23
400 m	(Tunisia) Oussama Mellouli	4:07.02	(United Kingdom) Robin Francis	4:08.06	(United States) Eric Shanteau	4:08.94
4 × 100 m	(United States) United States; Aaron Peirsol; Brendan Hansen; Ian Crocker; Jason Lezak	3:25.09 WR	(Australia) Australia; Matthew Welsh; Brenton Rickard; Andrew Richards; Andrew Mewing	3:29.72	(Russia) Russia; Arkady Vyatchanin; Andrei Ivanov; Nikolay Skvortsov; Andrey Kapralov	3:32.11

=== Women's Medley ===
Event	Gold		Silver		Bronze	
100 m	(Australia) Brooke Hanson	1:00.01	(Australia) Shayne Reese	1:00.92	(Slovakia) Martina Moravcová	1:00.95
200 m	(Australia) Brooke Hanson	2:09.81	(Australia) Lara Carroll	2:10.58	(United States) Katie Hoff	2:10.61
400 m	(United States) Kaitlin Sandeno	4:30.12	(United States) Katie Hoff	4:33.09	(Australia) Lara Carroll	4:35.46
4 × 100 m	(Australia) Australia; Sophie Edington; Brooke Hanson; Jessicah Schipper; Libby Lenton	3:54.95 WR	(United States) United States; Haley Cope; Tara Kirk; Jenny Thompson; Kara Lynn Joyce	3:55.68	(Sweden) Sweden; Therese Svendsen; Sara Larsson; Johanna Sjöberg; Josefin Lillhage	4:01.76

== Medal table ==
Rank	Nation	Gold	Silver	Bronze	Total
1	United States (USA)	21	10	10	41
2	Australia (AUS)	7	15	7	29
3	Great Britain (GBR)	2	3	0	5
4	Russia (RUS)	2	0	2	4
5	Sweden (SWE)	1	4	4	9
6	Brazil (BRA)	1	1	3	5
7	Germany (GER)	1	1	1	3
8	Japan (JPN)	1	0	1	2
8	Netherlands (NED)	1	0	1	2
8	Slovakia (SVK)	1	0	1	2
8	Slovenia (SLO)	1	0	1	2
8	Tunisia (TUN)	1	0	1	2
13	China (CHN)	0	2	1	3
14	Canada (CAN)	0	1	3	4
15	Romania (ROU)	0	1	1	2
16	Algeria (ALG)	0	1	0	1
16	Italy (ITA)	0	1	0	1
18	Kazakhstan (KAZ)	0	0	2	2
19	Croatia (CRO)	0	0	1	1
19	New Zealand (NZL)	0	0	1	1
Totals (20 entries)		40	40	41	121
