= Therese Alshammar =

Swedish swimmer (born 1977)

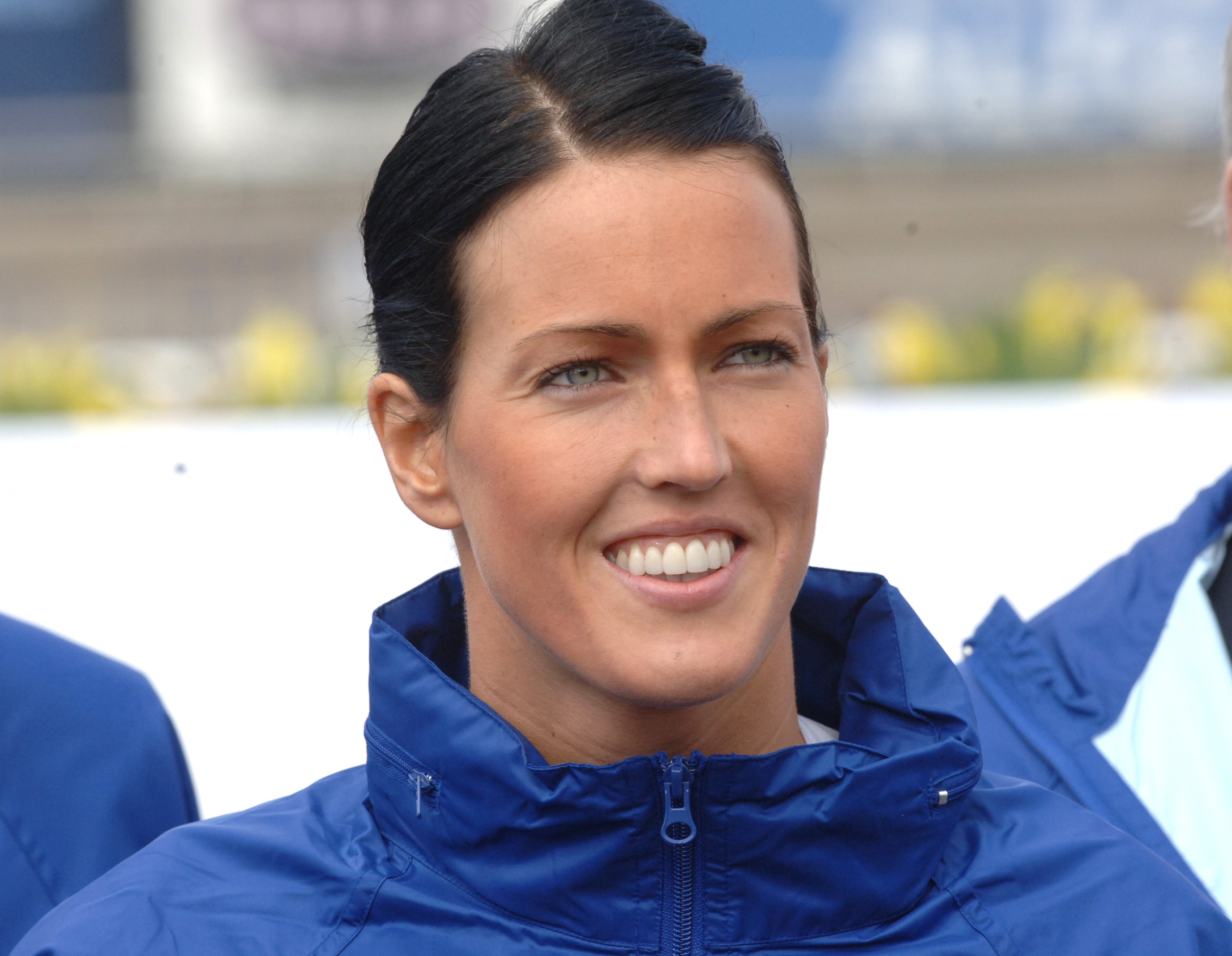
- Therese Alshammar in January 2013

Personal information
- Full name: Malin Therese Alshammar
- Nickname: Tessan
- Nationality: Sweden
- Born: 26 August 1977 (age 48) Solna, Sweden
- Height: 1.80 m (5 ft 11 in)
- Weight: 61 kg (134 lb)

Sport
- Sport: Swimming
- Strokes: butterfly, freestyle
- Club: Täby Sim
- College team: Nebraska Cornhuskers (1997–1999)
Medal record
Event	1st	2nd	3rd
Olympic Games	0	2	1
World Championships (LC)	2	5	1
World Championships (SC)	10	3	4
European Championships (LC)	10	7	4
European Championships (SC)	15	6	1
Total	37	23	11
Olympic Games
Silver medal – second place	2000 Sydney	50 m freestyle
Silver medal – second place	2000 Sydney	100 m freestyle
Bronze medal – third place	2000 Sydney	4×100 m freestyle
World Championships (LC)
Gold medal – first place	2007 Melbourne	50 m butterfly
Gold medal – first place	2011 Shanghai	50 m freestyle
Silver medal – second place	2001 Fukuoka	50 m freestyle
Silver medal – second place	2001 Fukuoka	50 m butterfly
Silver medal – second place	2007 Melbourne	50 m freestyle
Silver medal – second place	2009 Rome	50 m freestyle
Silver medal – second place	2011 Shanghai	50 m butterfly
Bronze medal – third place	2005 Montréal	50 m butterfly
World Championships (SC)
Gold medal – first place	2000 Athens	50 m freestyle
Gold medal – first place	2000 Athens	100 m freestyle
Gold medal – first place	2000 Athens	4×100 m freestyle
Gold medal – first place	2000 Athens	4×100 m medley
Gold medal – first place	2002 Moscow	50 m freestyle
Gold medal – first place	2002 Moscow	100 m freestyle
Gold medal – first place	2002 Moscow	4×100 m freestyle
Gold medal – first place	2002 Moscow	4×100 m medley
Gold medal – first place	2006 Shanghai	50 m butterfly
Gold medal – first place	2010 Dubai	50 m butterfly
Silver medal – second place	2004 Indianapolis	4×100 m freestyle
Silver medal – second place	2006 Shanghai	50 m freestyle
Silver medal – second place	2010 Dubai	100 m butterfly
Bronze medal – third place	1997 Gothenburg	4×100 m freestyle
Bronze medal – third place	1999 Hong Kong	4×100 m medley
Bronze medal – third place	2004 Indianapolis	50 m freestyle
Bronze medal – third place	2006 Shanghai	4×100 m freestyle
European Championships (LC)
Gold medal – first place	1999 Istanbul	4×100 m medley
Gold medal – first place	2000 Helsinki	50 m freestyle
Gold medal – first place	2000 Helsinki	100 m freestyle
Gold medal – first place	2000 Helsinki	4×100 m freestyle
Gold medal – first place	2000 Helsinki	4×100 m medley
Gold medal – first place	2002 Berlin	50 m freestyle
Gold medal – first place	2004 Madrid	50 m freestyle
Gold medal – first place	2006 Budapest	50 m butterfly
Gold medal – first place	2010 Budapest	50 m butterfly
Gold medal – first place	2010 Budapest	50 m freestyle
Silver medal – second place	1997 Seville	4×100 m freestyle
Silver medal – second place	1999 Istanbul	50 m freestyle
Silver medal – second place	1999 Istanbul	4×100 m freestyle
Silver medal – second place	2002 Berlin	4×100 m freestyle
Silver medal – second place	2002 Berlin	4×100 m medley
Silver medal – second place	2006 Budapest	50 m freestyle
Silver medal – second place	2010 Budapest	4x100 m medley
Bronze medal – third place	1997 Seville	50 m freestyle
Bronze medal – third place	2008 Eindhoven	50 m freestyle
Bronze medal – third place	2010 Budapest	4×100 m freestyle
Bronze medal – third place	2010 Budapest	100 m butterfly
European Championships (SC)
Gold medal – first place	1999 Lisbon	50 m freestyle
Gold medal – first place	1999 Lisbon	100 m freestyle
Gold medal – first place	1999 Lisbon	4x50 m freestyle
Gold medal – first place	1999 Lisbon	4x50 m medley
Gold medal – first place	2000 Valencia	50 m freestyle
Gold medal – first place	2000 Valencia	100 m freestyle
Gold medal – first place	2000 Valencia	4x50 m freestyle
Gold medal – first place	2000 Valencia	4x50 m medley
Gold medal – first place	2001 Antwerp	50 m butterfly
Gold medal – first place	2001 Antwerp	4x50 m freestyle
Gold medal – first place	2001 Antwerp	4x50 m medley
Gold medal – first place	2002 Riesa	4x50 m freestyle
Gold medal – first place	2002 Riesa	4x50 m medley
Gold medal – first place	2006 Helsinki	50 m butterfly
Gold medal – first place	2006 Helsinki	4x50 m freestyle
Silver medal – second place	1998 Sheffield	50 m backstroke
Silver medal – second place	1998 Sheffield	4x50 m medley
Silver medal – second place	2001 Antwerp	50 m freestyle
Silver medal – second place	2005 Trieste	4x50 m freestyle
Silver medal – second place	2006 Helsinki	50 m freestyle
Silver medal – second place	2006 Helsinki	4x50 m medley
Bronze medal – third place	2005 Trieste	4x50 m medley

Malin Therese Alshammar (born 26 August 1977) is a Swedish swimmer who has won three Olympic medals, 25 World Championship medals, and 43 European Championship medals. She is a specialist in short distances races in freestyle and butterfly. She is coached by former Swedish swimmer Johan Wallberg. She is the first female swimmer and the third overall (after Lars Frölander and Derya Büyükuncu) to participate in six Olympic Games.

== Biography ==
Alshammar was born in Solna in 1977, daughter of 7th placed Olympic breaststroke swimmer Britt-Marie Smedh and Krister Alshammar. She started swimming on the team of Sundbybergs IK.

At the beginning of her career she was a backstroke swimmer and in 1991, the year Alshammar turned 14, she won her first national short course title in the 50 m backstroke at the 1991 Swedish Short Course Swimming Championships. The year after, when she was 14 years old, she won her first national long course senior title, 100 m backstroke at the 1992 Swedish Swimming Championships representing Järfälla SS.

Alshammar was a part of the Swedish team at the 1993 European Championships in Sheffield, finishing fourth in the 100 m backstroke final, and in the inaugural World Short Course Championships in Palma de Mallorca. In Palma de Mallorca she placed ninth in the individual 100 m backstroke, swum the prelims in the silver medal-winning 4×100 m freestyle team and came fourth in the 4×100 m medley alongside breaststroker Hanna Jaltner, butterfly swimmer Ellenor Svensson and Linda Olofsson on the freestyle leg.

She first appeared on the international scene after the 1994 World Aquatics Championships where she made the semifinals in the 100 m backstroke. In the 1996 Olympics, she participated in this event and reached the semifinals.

In 1997, Alshammar moved to the United States and Lincoln, Nebraska to study at the University of Nebraska–Lincoln and swim for the Nebraska Cornhuskers swimming and diving team together with Destiny Laurén under the coach Cal Bentz. The time in the United States resulted in one individual 1999 Big 12 Conference Women's Swimming and Diving Championships gold medal, on the 100 yard freestyle. At the NCAA Division 1 Women's Swimming and Diving Championships, she won a silver medal in the 4×200 yard relay team 1998 and fourth in 50 yard freestyle and 100 yard freestyle 1999. Under her first year she was a part of the Nebraska Cornhuskers Big 12 Conference Women's Swimming and Diving Championships team. At a personal level she studied advertising.

Alshammar also trained at The Race Club, a swimming club founded by Olympic Swimmers Gary Hall Jr. and his father, Gary Hall Sr. The Race Club, originally known as "The World Team," was designed to serve as a training group for elite swimmers across the world in preparation for the 2000 Sydney Olympic Games. To be able to train with the Race Club, one must either have been ranked in the top 20 in the world the past 3 calendar years or top 3 in their nation in the past year. The Race Club included well-known swimmers as Roland Mark Schoeman, Mark Foster, Ryk Neethling, Ricky Busquet.

Alshammar won her first international medal, a bronze in the 50 m freestyle, at the 1997 European Championships. She developed this stroke into her speciality and won the silver at the 1999 European Championships. She broke through to the top ranks at the 2000 Summer Olympics in Sydney where she won silver medals in the 50 m and 100 m freestyle, both times vanquished by Inge de Bruijn, and a bronze medal with the Swedish relay team.

Since Sydney, she has been a favourite at major international events over short distances. At the World Championships in 2001 she won two silver medals, this time in the 50 m freestyle and 50 m butterfly. In the 2002 European Championships in Berlin she won the 50 m freestyle.

In 2003, she let up to focus on the Athens 2004 Olympic Games. In her only start in the 50 m, she barely missed a medal, coming fourth in the 50 m freestyle. In the 2005 World Aquatics Championships in Montreal, she won a bronze medal in the 50 m butterfly, and took the gold on the same distance at World Championships in Shanghai 2011. By winning three individual events at the 2006 Swedish Short Course Swimming Championships in Uppsala, she took her 73rd gold medal and became the Swedish swimmer with the most individual gold medals on the Swedish Championships, passing Anders Holmertz with one. She took her first gold medal in 1991.

On 17 March 2009, at the Australian Swimming Titles, she broke her own world record in the 50-meter butterfly with a time of 25.44. She was later disqualified by Swimming Australia for wearing two swimsuits. FINA, swimming's governing body, had ratified a new rule only 17 days previously that swimmers can only wear one suit. Alshammar initially appealed the disqualification but withdrew the appeal when the new rule was explained to her.

On 31 July 2011 she won the gold medal at 50 meter freestyle at the 2011 World Aquatics Championships, making her the oldest woman to win an individual gold medal at the long-course world championships. The day before, she had already won the silver medal in the 50 meter butterfly.

During the London Summer Olympics Alshammar participated in the 50 m freestyle, where she placed 6th.

In June 2016 she became the first female swimmer and the third overall (after Lars Frölander and Derya Büyükuncu) to participate in six Olympic Games. At the 2016 Summer Olympics, she competed in the 50 m freestyle event. She placed 15th in the semifinals and did not advance to the final.

Alshammar was the flag bearer for Sweden at the opening ceremony of the 2016 Summer Olympics in Rio de Janeiro.

== Personal life ==
Alshammar is in a relationship with her coach Johan Wallberg. In June 2013 they became parents of a son. She participated in Let's Dance 2018, broadcast on TV4.

She grew up in Duvbo, a part of Sundbyberg Municipality.

== Awards ==
- Radiosportens Jerringpris: 2010
- Svenska Dagbladet Gold Medal: 2011
- Victoria Scholarship: 2000
- FINA Swimmer of the Year: 2010
- H. M. The King's Medal 8:e with ribbon

== Personal bests ==
=== Long course (50 m) ===
Event	Time		Date	Meet	Location	Ref
50 m freestyle	23.88		2 Aug 2009	World Championships	Rome, Italy	
100 m freestyle	53.58	(r)	26 Jul 2009	World Championships	Rome, Italy	
50 m backstroke	29.22		7 May 2005	Trofeu Brasil	Belo Horizonte, Brazil	
100 m backstroke	1.01.61		20 Jan 2012	Western Australia State Open Championships 2012	Australia	
50 m butterfly	25.07	(sf)	31 Jul 2009	World Championships	Rome, Italy	
100 m butterfly	57.55		12 Aug 2010	2010 European Championships	Budapest, Hungary	

Legend: WR – World record; ER – European record; NR – Swedish record;
Records not set in finals: h – heat; sf – semifinal; r – relay 1st leg; rh – relay heat 1st leg; b – B final; † – en route to final mark; so – swim-off; tt – time trial

=== Short course (25 m) ===
Event	Time		Date	Meet	Location	Ref
50 m freestyle	23.27	NR	21 Nov 2009	World Cup	Singapore	
100 m freestyle	52.17		17 Mar 2000	World SC Championships	Athens, Greece	
50 m backstroke	26.62	NR	29 Nov 2009	Swedish SC Championships	Gothenburg, Sweden	
100 m backstroke	57.43	(r)	26 Nov 2009	Swedish SC Championships	Gothenburg, Sweden	
50 m butterfly	24.38	ER	22 Nov 2009	World Cup	Singapore, Singapore	
100 m butterfly	55.53		6 Nov 2010	World Cup	Stockholm, Sweden	
100 m individual medley	58.07	NR	26 Nov 2009	Swedish SC Championships	Gothenburg, Sweden	

Legend: WR – World record; ER – European record; NR – Swedish record;
Records not set in finals: h – heat; sf – semifinal; r – relay 1st leg; rh – relay heat 1st leg; b – B final; † – en route to final mark; so – swim-off; tt – time trial

== Clubs ==
- Sundbybergs IK
- Stockholmspolisens IF
- Järfälla SS (−1992)
- SK Neptun (1993–1995, 1996–2008)
- Helsingborgs SS (1996)
- Täby Sim (2008–)

== See also ==
- World record progression 50 metres butterfly
- World record progression 50 metres freestyle
- World record progression 100 metres freestyle

Records
Preceded by Le Jingyi	Women's 100 metre freestyle world record holder (short course); 10 December 1999 – 8 August 2005	Succeeded by Lisbeth Lenton
Preceded by Le Jingyi	Women's 50 metre freestyle world record holder (short course); 11 December 1999 – 17 November 2007	Succeeded by Marleen Veldhuis
Preceded by Anna-Karin Kammerling; Marleen Veldhuis	Women's 50 metre butterfly world record holder (long course); 13 June 2007 – 19 April 2009; 31 July 2009 – 5 July 2014	Succeeded by Marleen Veldhuis; Sarah Sjöström
Preceded by Felicity Galvez	Women's 50 metre butterfly world record holder (short course); 12 November 2008 – 15 November 2008; 17 October 2009 – 10 December 2024	Succeeded by Marieke Guehrer; Gretchen Walsh
Sporting positions
Preceded by Anna-Karin Kammerling	Female World Cup Overall Winner; 2005/2006 – 2007	Succeeded by Marieke Guehrer
Preceded by Jessica Hardy	Female World Cup Overall Winner; 2010–2011	Succeeded by Katinka Hosszú
Awards
Preceded by First award	FINA Swimmer of the Year; 2010	Succeeded by Missy Franklin
Preceded by Johan Olsson, Daniel Richardsson, Anders Södergren & Marcus Hellner	Svenska Dagbladet Gold Medal; 2011	Succeeded by Lisa Nordén
Olympic Games
Preceded by Rolf-Göran Bengtsson	Flagbearer for Sweden; 2016 Rio de Janeiro	Succeeded by Sara Algotsson Ostholt & Max Salminen
