= Anna-Karin Kammerling =

Swedish swimmer

Personal information
- Full name: Anna-Karin Simone Kammerling
- Nationality: Sweden
- Born: 19 October 1980 (age 45) Malmö, Sweden
- Height: 1.78 m (5 ft 10 in)

Sport
- Sport: Swimming
- Strokes: Freestyle and butterfly
- Club: Sundsvalls Simsällskap
Medal record
Women's swimming
Representing Sweden
Event	1st	2nd	3rd
Olympic Games	0	0	1
World Championships (LC)	0	1	2
World Championships (SC)	5	4	3
European Championships (LC)	4	3	1
European Championships (SC)	16	10	9
Total	25	18	16
Olympic Games
Bronze medal – third place	2000 Sydney	4×100 m freestyle
World Championships (LC)
Silver medal – second place	2005 Montreal	50 m butterfly
Bronze medal – third place	2001 Fukuoka	50 m butterfly
Bronze medal – third place	2003 Barcelona	50 m butterfly
World Championships (SC)
Gold medal – first place	2000 Athens	4×100 m freestyle
Gold medal – first place	2000 Athens	4×100 m medley
Gold medal – first place	2002 Moscow	50 m butterfly
Gold medal – first place	2002 Moscow	4×100 m freestyle
Gold medal – first place	2002 Moscow	4×100 m medley
Silver medal – second place	1999 Hong Kong	50 m butterfly
Silver medal – second place	2000 Athens	50 m butterfly
Silver medal – second place	2004 Indianapolis	50 m butterfly
Silver medal – second place	2004 Indianapolis	4×100 m freestyle
Bronze medal – third place	2002 Moscow	100 m butterfly
Bronze medal – third place	2006 Shanghai	4×100 m freestyle
Bronze medal – third place	2006 Shanghai	50 m butterfly
European Championships (LC)
Gold medal – first place	1999 Istanbul	50 m butterfly
Gold medal – first place	2000 Helsinki	50 m butterfly
Gold medal – first place	2000 Helsinki	4×100 m freestyle
Gold medal – first place	2002 Berlin	50 m butterfly
Silver medal – second place	2002 Berlin	4×100 m freestyle
Silver medal – second place	2002 Berlin	4×100 m medley
Silver medal – second place	2006 Budapest	50 m butterfly
Bronze medal – third place	2002 Berlin	100 m butterfly
European Championships (SC)
Gold medal – first place	1999 Lisbon	50 m butterfly
Gold medal – first place	1999 Lisbon	4×50 m freestyle
Gold medal – first place	1999 Lisbon	4×50 m medley
Gold medal – first place	2000 Valencia	50 m butterfly
Gold medal – first place	2000 Valencia	4×50 m freestyle
Gold medal – first place	2000 Valencia	4×50 m medley
Gold medal – first place	2001 Antwerp	4×50 m freestyle
Gold medal – first place	2001 Antwerp	4×50 m medley
Gold medal – first place	2002 Riesa	50 m butterfly
Gold medal – first place	2002 Riesa	4×50 m freestyle
Gold medal – first place	2002 Riesa	4×50 m medley
Gold medal – first place	2003 Dublin	50 m butterfly
Gold medal – first place	2004 Vienna	50 m butterfly
Gold medal – first place	2005 Trieste	50 m butterfly
Gold medal – first place	2006 Helsinki	4×50 m freestyle
Gold medal – first place	2007 Debrecen	50 m butterfly
Silver medal – second place	1998 Sheffield	50 m butterfly
Silver medal – second place	1998 Sheffield	4×50 m medley
Silver medal – second place	1999 Lisbon	50 m freestyle
Silver medal – second place	2001 Antwerp	50 m butterfly
Silver medal – second place	2002 Riesa	100 m butterfly
Silver medal – second place	2003 Dublin	4×50 m freestyle
Silver medal – second place	2004 Vienna	50 m butterfly
Silver medal – second place	2005 Trieste	4×50 m freestyle
Silver medal – second place	2006 Helsinki	4×50 m medley
Silver medal – second place	2007 Debrecen	4×50 m medley
Bronze medal – third place	2000 Valencia	50 m freestyle
Bronze medal – third place	2001 Antwerp	100 m butterfly
Bronze medal – third place	2002 Riesa	50 m freestyle
Bronze medal – third place	2004 Vienna	4×50 m freestyle
Bronze medal – third place	2004 Vienna	4×50 m medley
Bronze medal – third place	2005 Trieste	50 m freestyle
Bronze medal – third place	2005 Trieste	4×50 m medley
Bronze medal – third place	2006 Helsinki	50 m butterfly
Bronze medal – third place	2007 Debrecen	4×50 m freestyle

Anna-Karin Kammerling (born 19 October 1980) is a world-record breaking Swedish former swimmer, who was born in Malmö, Sweden.

Kammerling has twice lowered the world record in the 50-meter butterfly event. In 2000, she was a member of the 4×100 m freestyle team that were awarded bronze medals during the Summer Olympics.

== Personal bests ==
=== Long course (50 m) ===
Event	Time		Date	Meet	Location	Ref
50 m freestyle	25.14		14 Jul 2004	Swedish Championships	Stockholm, Sweden	
100 m freestyle	56.43	(r)	16 Jul 2004	Swedish Championships	Stockholm, Sweden	
50 m butterfly	25.57		30 Jul 2002	European Championships	Berlin, Germany	
100 m butterfly	58.71	(sf)	20 Jul 2003	World Championships	Barcelona, Spain	

Legend: WR – World record; ER – European record; NR – Swedish record;
Records not set in finals: h – heat; sf – semifinal; r – relay 1st leg; rh – relay heat 1st leg; b – B final; † – en route to final mark; so – swim-off; tt – time trial

=== Short course (25 m) ===
Event	Time	Date	Meet	Location	Ref
50 m freestyle	24.32	17 Nov 2007	World Cup	Berlin, Germany	
100 m freestyle	54.01	12 Apr 2008	Norrländska Mästerskapen	Sundsvall, Sweden	
50 m backstroke	28.24	25 Nov 2007	Swedish Championships	Jönköping, Sweden	
50 m butterfly	25.33	12 Mar 2005	Swedish SC Championships	Gothenburg, Sweden	
100 m butterfly	57.70	24 Nov 2006	Swedish SC Championships	Uppsala, Sweden	
100 m individual medley	1:03.50	13 Feb 2004	Norrländska Mästerskapen	Umeå, Sweden	

Legend: WR – World record; ER – European record; NR – Swedish record;
Records not set in finals: h – heat; sf – semifinal; r – relay 1st leg; rh – relay heat 1st leg; b – B final; † – en route to final mark; so – swim-off; tt – time trial

== Swimming events ==
Year	Course (long/short)	Championship	Butterfly				Freestyle		Freestyle relay				Medley relay			
Year	Course (long/short)	Championship	50 m		100 m		50 m		50 m		100 m		50 m		100 m	
Year	Course (long/short)	Championship	Place	Time	Place	Time	Place	Time	Place	Time	Place	Time	Place	Time	Place	Time
1998	Short	European	2nd	26.30												
1999	Long	European	1st	26.29			5th	25.69								
1999	Short	World	2nd	26.21			6th	25.08								
1999	Short	European	1st	25.64			2nd	24.90								
2000	Long	Olympic Games			16th	1:00.40	9th	25.61			3rd	3:40.30				
2000	Long	European	1st	26.40	5th	59.47	4th	25.82			1st	3:42.38				
2000	Short	World	2nd	26.16												
2000	Short	European	1st	25.60			3rd	24.75	1st	1:38.21^{1}			1st	1:48.31^{1}		
2001	Long	World	3rd	26.45			18th	25.96			4th	3:41.18				
2001	Short	European	2nd	25.78	3rd	57.98			1st	1:38.29			1st	1:48.32		
2002	Long	European	1st	25.57²	3rd	58.94					2nd	3:40.66			2nd	4:06.15
2002	Short	World	1st	25.55	3rd	58.12					1st	3:35.09			1st	3:55.78²
2002	Short	European	1st	25.78	2nd	57.94	3rd	24.98								
2003	Long	World	3rd	26.06	6th	59.14	14th	25.60			6th	3:41.36				
2003	Short	European			1st	25.91										
2004	Long	Olympic Games									7th	3:41.22				
2004	Short	World	2nd	26.02			9th	26.02			2nd	3:35.83				
2004	Short	European	1st	25.73			2nd	24.57	3rd	1:38.76			3rd	1:50.05		

Notes:

1. World-best performance.
2. World record.

== Clubs ==
- Bollnäs SS
- Söderhamns SS
- Sundsvalls SS

Records
Preceded by Inge de Bruijn; Inge de Bruijn	World Record Holder; Women's 50 Butterfly; 1 July 1999 – 20 May 2000; 30 July 2002 – 13 June 2007	Succeeded by Inge de Bruijn; Therese Alshammar
Preceded by Jenny Thompson	World Record Holder; Women's 50 Butterfly (25m); 10 December 1999 – 11 April 2008	Succeeded by Felicity Galvez

Sporting positions
Preceded by Martina Moravcová	FINA World Cup overall female winner 2004/2005	Succeeded by Therese Alshammar
