= 1995 Pan Pacific Swimming Championships – Men's 50 metre freestyle =

Men's 50 metre freestyle at the 1995 Pan Pacific Swimming Championships
- Venue: Georgia Tech Aquatic Center
- Dates: August 13, 1995 (heats & finals)
- Competitors: 51 from 17 nations
- Winning time: 22.30

Medalists
gold medal	Gary Hall, Jr.	United States
silver medal	David Fox	United States
bronze medal	Chris Fydler	Australia

The men's 50 metre freestyle competition at the 1995 Pan Pacific Swimming Championships took place on August 13 at the Georgia Tech Aquatic Center. The last champion was Jon Olsen of US.

This race consisted of one length of the pool in freestyle.

== Records ==
Prior to this competition, the existing world and Pan Pacific records were as follows:

World record	Tom Jager (USA)	21.81	Nashville, United States	March 24, 1990
Pan Pacific Championships record	Tom Jager (USA)	22.12	Tokyo, Japan	August 20, 1989

== Results ==
All times are in minutes and seconds.

KEY:	q	Fastest non-qualifiers	Q	Qualified	CR	Championships record	NR	National record	PB	Personal best	SB	Seasonal best

=== Heats ===
The first round was held on August 13.

Rank	Name	Nationality	Time	Notes
1	Gary Hall, Jr.	United States	22.56	QA
2	David Fox	United States	22.57	QA
3	Jon Olsen	United States	22.90	QA
4	Darren Lange	Australia	22.94	QA
5	Chris Fydler	Australia	23.09	QA
6	Francisco Sánchez	Venezuela	23.10	QA
7	Felipe Delgado	Ecuador	23.20	QA
8	Joe Hudepohl	United States	23.32	QA
9	Alexey Khovrin	Kazakhstan	23.33	QB
10	Sergey Borisenko	Kazakhstan	23.37	QB
11	Ricardo Busquets	Puerto Rico	23.41	QB
12	Dean Kondziolka	Canada	23.49	QB
13	Robert Braknis	Canada	23.50	QB
14	Sabir Muhammad	United States	23.52	QB
15	Tripp Schwenk	United States	23.55	QB
16	Ryan Laurin	Canada	23.57	QB
17	Michael Klim	Australia	23.65	
18	Yukihiro Matsushita	Japan	23.73	
19	Richard Upton	Australia	23.79	
20	Hirosuke Hamano	Japan	23.83	
21	Nicholas Tongue	New Zealand	23.87	
22	Alejandro Carrizo	Venezuela	23.89	
23	Yannick Lupien	Canada	23.91	
24	Alexey Yegorov	Kazakhstan	23.93	
25	John Steel	New Zealand	24.09	
26	Stephen Clarke	Canada	24.10	
27	Nelson Vargas	Mexico	24.15	
28	Michael Wright	Hong Kong	24.16	
29	Timothy Moffel	Panama	24.25	
30	Rafael Moscote	Panama	24.29	
31	Luiz López	Peru	24.34	
32	Diego Henao	Venezuela	24.37	
33	Arthur Li	Hong Kong	24.40	
34	Raymond Papa	Philippines	24.42	
35	Michael Lillnlhal	Venezuela	24.45	
36	Jose Isaza	Panama	24.51	
37	Doug Wake	Canada	24.53	
38	Carlos Arena	Mexico	24.65	
39	Guillermo Diaz	Mexico	24.81	
40	Yun-Ho Koh	South Korea	24.86	
41	Stephen Fahy	Bermuda	24.93	
42	Jesus Gonzalez	Mexico	25.11	
43	Gustavo Barrios	Panama	25.19	
44	Rodrigo Castillo	Mexico	25.31	
45	German Cardenas	Mexico	25.33	
46	Chris Bembenek	Panama	25.40	
46	Carlo Manolok	Philippines	25.40	
48	Martin Rodriguez	Panama	25.51	
48	Juan Puente	Mexico	25.51	
50	Jose Martinez	Colombia	25.55	
51	Antonio Antonio	Philippines	25.67	

=== B Final ===
The B final was held on August 13.

Rank	Name	Nationality	Time	Notes
9	Jon Olsen	United States	22.82	
10	Robert Braknis	Canada	23.27	
11	Ricardo Busquets	Puerto Rico	23.31	
12	Dean Kondziolka	Canada	23.36	
13	Michael Klim	Australia	23.52	
14	Hirosuke Hamano	Japan	23.65	
15	Yukihiro Matsushita	Japan	23.72	
16	Nicholas Tongue	New Zealand	23.91	

=== A Final ===
The A final was held on August 13.

Rank	Lane	Nationality	Time	Notes
1st place, gold medalist(s)	Gary Hall, Jr.	United States	22.30	
2nd place, silver medalist(s)	David Fox	United States	22.31	
3rd place, bronze medalist(s)	Chris Fydler	Australia	22.64	
4	Darren Lange	Australia	22.81	
5	Francisco Sánchez	Venezuela	22.92	
6	Felipe Delgado	Ecuador	23.01	NR
7	Alexey Khovrin	Kazakhstan	23.10	
8	Sergey Borisenko	Kazakhstan	23.32	
