= 1995 Pan Pacific Swimming Championships – Men's 100 metre freestyle =

Men's 100 metre freestyle at the 1995 Pan Pacific Swimming Championships
- Venue: Georgia Tech Aquatic Center
- Dates: August 11, 1995 (heats & finals)
- Competitors: 55 from 19 nations
- Winning time: 49.47

Medalists
gold medal	Gary Hall, Jr.	United States
silver medal	Jon Olsen	United States
bronze medal	Chris Fydler	Australia

The men's 100 metre freestyle competition at the 1995 Pan Pacific Swimming Championships took place on August 11 at the Georgia Tech Aquatic Center. The last champion was Jon Olsen of US.

This race consisted of two lengths of the pool, both lengths being in freestyle.

== Records ==
Prior to this competition, the existing world and Pan Pacific records were as follows:

World record	Alexander Popov (RUS)	48.21	Monte Carlo, Monaco	June 18, 1994
Pan Pacific Championships record	Matt Biondi (USA)	49.17	Tokyo, Japan	August 16, 1985

== Results ==
All times are in minutes and seconds.

KEY:	q	Fastest non-qualifiers	Q	Qualified	CR	Championships record	NR	National record	PB	Personal best	SB	Seasonal best

=== Heats ===
The first round was held on August 11.

Rank	Name	Nationality	Time	Notes
1	Jon Olsen	United States	49.62	QA
2	Gary Hall, Jr.	United States	49.77	QA
3	Chris Fydler	Australia	49.86	QA
4	David Fox	United States	49.90	QA
5	Joe Hudepohl	United States	50.11	QA
6	Francisco Sánchez	Venezuela	50.16	QA
7	Stephen Clarke	Canada	50.60	QA
8	Michael Klim	Australia	50.66	QA
9	Danyon Loader	New Zealand	50.81	QB
10	Darren Lange	Australia	50.82	QB
11	Richard Upton	Australia	50.99	QB
12	John Steel	New Zealand	51.10	QB
13	Felipe Delgado	Ecuador	51.16	QB
14	Ricardo Busquets	Puerto Rico	51.20	QB
15	Yukihiro Matsushita	Japan	51.32	QB
16	Robert Braknis	Canada	51.55	QB
17	Alexey Yegorov	Kazakhstan	51.57	
18	Ron Watson	Canada	51.59	
19	Nicholas Tongue	New Zealand	51.62	
20	Trent Bray	New Zealand	51.74	
21	Malcolm Allen	Australia	51.79	
22	Diego Henao	Venezuela	51.87	
23	Hiroshi Fukuda	Japan	51.97	
24	Ryan Laurin	Canada	52.02	
25	Nelson Vargas	Mexico	52.15	
26	Yannick Lupien	Canada	52.30	
27	Hirosuke Hamano	Japan	52.35	
28	Alejandro Carrizo	Venezuela	52.48	
29	Michael Wright	Hong Kong	52.61	
30	Diego Perdomo	Colombia	52.64	
31	Doug Wake	Canada	52.68	
32	Jose Isaza	Panama	52.72	
33	Dean Kondziolka	Canada	52.77	
34	Sergey Borisenko	Kazakhstan	52.83	
35	Carlos Arena	Mexico	52.92	
36	Raymond Papa	Philippines	53.07	
37	Arthur Li	Hong Kong	53.23	
38	Michael Lillnlhal	Venezuela	53.31	
39	Luiz López	Peru	53.50	
40	Guillermo Diaz	Mexico	53.57	
41	Sebastian Muniz	Peru	53.59	
42	Yun-Ho Koh	South Korea	53.88	
43	Jose Martinez	Colombia	54.40	
44	Agustin Guzman	Mexico	54.49	
45	Fernando Zagacela	Mexico	54.53	
46	Archimedes Lim	Philippines	54.62	
47	Gustavo Barrios	Panama	54.63	
48	Nili Intharapichal	Thailand	54.65	
49	German Cardenas	Mexico	54.70	
50	Carlo Manolok	Philippines	54.85	
51	Stephen Fahy	Bermuda	55.07	
52	S.Paddington	Trinidad and Tobago	55.47	
53	Rodrigo Castillo	Mexico	55.65	
54	Stanley Harris	Bermuda	56.08	
55	Antonio Antonio	Philippines	1:00.72	

=== B Final ===
The B final was held on August 11.

Rank	Name	Nationality	Time	Notes
9	David Fox	United States	50.17	
10	Darren Lange	Australia	50.97	
11	Ricardo Busquets	Puerto Rico	51.12	
12	Robert Braknis	Canada	51.30	
13	Yukihiro Matsushita	Japan	51.61	
14	Alexey Yegorov	Kazakhstan	51.63	
15	Ron Watson	Canada	51.70	
16	Felipe Delgado	Ecuador	51.79	

=== A Final ===
The A final was held on August 11.

Rank	Lane	Nationality	Time	Notes
1st place, gold medalist(s)	Gary Hall, Jr.	United States	49.47	
2nd place, silver medalist(s)	Jon Olsen	United States	49.56	
3rd place, bronze medalist(s)	Chris Fydler	Australia	49.95	
4	Francisco Sánchez	Venezuela	50.07	NR
5	Michael Klim	Australia	50.44	
6	John Steel	New Zealand	50.76	
7	Danyon Loader	New Zealand	50.98	
8	Stephen Clarke	Canada	51.01	
