= Swimming at the 1994 Commonwealth Games =

- Venue: Saanich Aquatic Complex, Saanich Commonwealth Place
- Location: Victoria, Canada
- Dates: 18 to 28 August 1994

Swimming at the 1994 Commonwealth Games was the 15th appearance of Swimming at the Commonwealth Games. Competition featured 34 events and was held in Victoria, Canada, from 18 to 28 August 1994.

The events were held at the Saanich Aquatic Complex, at Saanich Commonwealth Place, on 4636 Elk Lake Drive in Saanich. The centre was constructed in 1993, specifically with the Games in mind and cost $22 million.

Australia topped the medal table with 25 gold medals.

== Medal table ==
* Host nation (Canada)

Rank	Nation	Gold	Silver	Bronze	Total
1	Australia	25	17	11	53
2	England	6	4	8	18
3	Canada*	2	8	9	19
4	New Zealand	1	5	2	8
5	South Africa	0	0	2	2
6	Scotland	0	0	1	1
Totals (6 entries)		34	34	33	101

Key

Host nation

== Medallists ==
Men

Event	Gold		Silver		Bronze	
50 m freestyle	Mark Foster; England	23.12	Darren Lange; Australia	23.13	Peter Williams; South Africa	23.16
100 m freestyle	Stephen Clarke; Canada	50.21	Chris Fydler; Australia	50.51	Andrew Baildon; Australia	50.71
200 m freestyle	Kieren Perkins; Australia	1:49.31	Trent Bray; New Zealand	1:49.47	Danyon Loader; New Zealand	1:49.53
400 m freestyle	Kieren Perkins; Australia	3:45.77; GR	Danyon Loader; New Zealand	3:49.65	Daniel Kowalski; Australia	3:50.41
1500 m freestyle	Kieren Perkins; Australia	14:41.66; WR	Daniel Kowalski; Australia	14:53.61	Glen Housman; Australia	15:02.59
100 m backstroke	Martin Harris; England	55.77	Steven Dewick; Australia	56.09	Adam Ruckwood; England	56.52
200 m backstroke	Adam Ruckwood; England	2:00.79	Kevin Draxinger; Canada	2:02.19	Scott Miller; Australia	2:02.43
100 m breaststroke	Phil Rogers; Australia	1:02.62	Nick Gillingham; England	1:02.65	Jon Cleveland; Canada	1:03.20
200 m breaststroke	Nick Gillingham; England	2:12.54	Phil Rogers; Australia	2:13.56	Jon Cleveland; Canada	2:14.91
100 m butterfly	Scott Miller; Australia	54.39	Stephen Clarke; Canada	54.45	Adam Pine; Australia	54.76
200 m butterfly	Danyon Loader; New Zealand	1:59.54	Scott Miller; Australia	1:59.70	James Hickman; England	2:00.87
200 m individual medley	Matt Dunn; Australia	2:02.28	Curtis Myden; Canada	2:03.47	Fraser Walker; Scotland	2:04.28
400 m individual medley	Matt Dunn; Australia	4:17.01	Curtis Myden; Canada	4:17.73	Philip Bryant; Australia	4:21.34
4 × 100 m freestyle	Australia; Andrew Baildon; Chris Fydler; Darren Lange; Dwade Sheehan	3:20.89	New Zealand; Danyon Loader; John Steel; Nicholas Tongue; Trent Bray	3:21.79	England; Andrew Clayton; Mark Foster; Michael Fibbens; Nicholas Shackell	3:22.61
4 × 200 m freestyle	Australia; Glen Housman; Kieren Perkins; Martin Roberts; Matthew Dunn	7:20.80	New Zealand; Danyon Loader; Guy Callaghan; John Steel; Trent Bray	7:21.67	England; Andrew Clayton; James Salter; Nicholas Shackell; Steven Mellor	7:26.19
4 × 100 m medley	Australia; Chris Fydler; Phil Rogers; Scott Miller; Steven Dewick	3:40.41	Canada; Chris Renaud; Jon Cleveland; Robert Braknis; Stephen Clarke	3:43.25	England; James Hickman; Martin Harris; Nick Gillingham; Nicholas Shackell	3:44.72

Women

Event	Gold		Silver		Bronze	
50 m freestyle	Karen Van Wirdum; Australia	25.90	Andrea Nugent; Canada	26.24	Shannon Shakespeare; Canada	26.27
100 m freestyle	Karen Pickering; England	56.20	Karen Van Wirdum; Australia	56.42	Marianne Limpert; Canada	56.44
200 m freestyle	Susie O'Neill; Australia	2:00.86	Nicole Stevenson; Australia	2:01.34	Karen Pickering; England	2:01.50
400 m freestyle	Hayley Lewis; Australia	4:12.56	Stacey Gartrell; Australia	4:13.06	Sarah Hardcastle; England	4:13.29
800 m freestyle	Stacey Gartrell; Australia	8:30.18	Hayley Lewis; Australia	8:30.72	Nikki Dryden; Canada	8:37.70
100 m backstroke	Nicole Stevenson; Australia	1:02.68	Elli Overton; Australia	1:02.90	Kathy Osher; England	1:03.27
200 m backstroke	Nicole Stevenson; Australia	2:12.73	Anna Simcic; New Zealand	2:13.94	Elli Overton; Australia	2:14.96
100 m breaststroke	Samantha Riley; Australia	1:08.02	Rebecca Brown; Australia	1:09.40	Penny Heyns; South Africa	1:09.86
200 m breaststroke	Samantha Riley; Australia	2:25.53	Rebecca Brown; Australia	2:30.24	Lisa Flood; Canada	2:31.85
100 m butterfly	Petria Thomas; Australia	1:00.21	Susie O'Neill; Australia	1:00.24	Elli Overton; Australia	1:01.88
200 m butterfly	Susie O'Neill; Australia	2:09.96	Hayley Lewis; Australia	2:12.21	Julie Majer; Australia	2:12.43
200 m individual medley	Elli Overton; Australia	2:15.59	Marianne Limpert; Canada	2:15.97	Nancy Sweetnam; Canada	2:16.67
400 m individual medley	Elli Overton; Australia	4:44.01	Nancy Sweetnam; Canada	4:46.20	Hayley Lewis; Australia	4:46.62
4 × 100 m freestyle	England; Alex Bennett; Claire Huddart; Karen Pickering; Sue Rolph	3:46.23	Australia; Elli Overton; Karen van Wirdum; Sarah Ryan; Susan O'Neill	3:46.73	Canada; Glencara Maughan; Jessica Amey; Marianne Limpert; Shannon Shakespeare	3:47.25
4 × 200 m freestyle	Australia; Anna Windsor; Hayley Lewis; Nicole Stevenson; Susan O'Neill	8:08.06	England; Alex Bennett; Claire Huddart; Karen Pickering; Sarah Hardcastle	8:09.62	Not awarded (only 4 entries)	
4 × 100 m medley	Australia; Samantha Riley; Karen Van Wirdum; Petria Thomas; Nicole Stevenson	4:07.89	England; Alex Bennett; Karen Pickering; Kathy Osher; Marie Hardiman	4:12.83	Canada; Beth Hazel; Jessica Amey; Lisa Flood; Marianne Limpert	4:14.04

Paralympic

Event	Gold		Silver		Bronze	
Men's 100 m freestyle S9	Andrew Haley; Canada	1:03.07	Brendan Burkett; Australia	1:03.75	Sean Tretheway; New Zealand	1:05.30
Women's 100 m freestyle S9	Melissa Carlton; Australia	1:09.61	Claire Bishop; England	1:11.00	Kelly Barnes; Australia	1:11.03

== Finals (men) ==
=== 50m freestyle ===
Pos	Athlete	Time
1	(England) Mark Foster	23.12
2	(Australia) Darren Lange	23.13
3	(South Africa) Peter Williams	23.16
4	(Australia) Roger David Smith	x23.26
5	(Canada) Rob Braknis	23.49
6	(Australia) Dwade Sheehan	23.63
6	(Canada) Stephen Clarke	23.63
8	(Cyprus) Stavros Michaelides	23.69

=== 100m freestyle ===
Pos	Athlete	Time
1	(Canada) Stephen Clarke	50.21
2	(Australia) Chris Fydler	50.51
3	(Australia) Andrew Baildon	50.71
4	(New Zealand) John Steel	51.15
5	(Australia) Dwade Sheehan	51.25
6	(New Zealand) Trent Bray	51.36
7	(England) Mike Fibbens	51.44
7	(England) Nicholas Shackell	51.44

=== 200m freestyle ===
Pos	Athlete	Time
1	(Australia) Kieren Perkins	1:49.31
2	(New Zealand) Trent Bray	1:49.47
3	(New Zealand) Danyon Loader	1:49.53
4	(Australia) Glen Housman	1:51.10
5	(England) Andrew Clayton	1:51.81
6	(Canada) Turlough O'Hare	1:51.83
7	(England) Steve Mellor	1:51.99
8	(Canada) Owen Von Richter	1:52.60

=== 400m freestyle ===
Pos	Athlete	Time
1	(Australia) Kieren Perkins	3:45.77
2	(New Zealand) Danyon Loader	3:49.65
3	(Australia) Daniel Kowalski	3:50.41
4	(New Zealand) Trent Bray	3:52.86
5	(Australia) Glen Housman	3:55.93
6	(Canada) Turlough O'Hare	3:56.50
7	(Scotland) Graeme Smith	3:58.14
8	(Canada) Robert McFarlane	4:01.37

=== 1500m freestyle ===
Pos	Athlete	Time
1	(Australia) Kieren Perkins	14:41.66
2	(Australia) Daniel Kowalski	14:53.61
3	(Australia) Glen Housman	15:02.59
4	(England) Ian Wilson	15:08.77
5	(Scotland) Graeme Smith	15:13.61
6	(Canada) Brett Creed	15:42.02
7	(South Africa) Frans Neethling	15:42.72
8	(Canada) Stephen Baird	15:56.10

=== 100m backstroke ===
Pos	Athlete	Time
1	(England) Martin Harris	55.77
2	(Australia) Steven Dewick	56.09
3	(England) Adam Ruckwood	56.52
4	(Canada) Rob Braknis	56.86
5	(Canada) Chris Renaud	57.01
6	(Canada) Raymond Brown	57.38
7	(New Zealand) Jonathan Winter	57.40
8	(New Zealand) Craig Ford	57.42

=== 200m backstroke ===
Pos	Athlete	Time
1	(England) Adam Ruckwood	2:00.79
2	(Canada) Kevin Draxinger	2:02.19
3	(Australia) Scott Miller	2:02.43
4	(England) Matthew O'Connor	2:03.27
5	(Australia) Simon Patrick Beqir	2:03.28
6	(Canada) Chris Renaud	2:03.47
7	(Canada) Gary Anderson	2:05.35
8	(Scotland) Andrew Aitken	2:07.85

=== 100m breaststroke ===
Pos	Athlete	Time
1	(Australia) Phil Rogers	1:02.62
2	(England) Nick Gillingham	1:02.65
3	(Canada) Jon Cleveland	1:03.20
4	(New Zealand) Paul Kent	1:03.62
5	(Canada) Russell Patrick	1:04.04
6	(Australia) Shane Lewis	1:04.13
7	(England) James Parrack	1:04.28
8	(Canada) Michael Mason	1:04.29

=== 200m breaststroke ===
Pos	Athlete	Time
1	(England) Nick Gillingham	2:12.54
2	(Australia) Phil Rogers	2:13.56
3	(Canada) Jon Cleveland	2:14.91
4	(Australia) Ryan Mitchell	2:17.00
5	(Canada) Michael Mason	2:18.86
6	(Australia) Rodney Lawson	2:19.23
7	(Scotland) Neil Hudghton	2:19.77
8	(New Zealand) Paul Kent	2:20.87

=== 100m butterfly ===
Pos	Athlete	Time
1	(Australia) Scott Miller	54.39
2	(Canada) Stephen Clarke	54.45
3	(Australia) Adam Pine	54.76
4	(New Zealand) Danyon Loader	55.07
5	(Australia) Martin Roberts	55.24
6	(New Zealand) Guy Callaghan	55.62
7	(England) James Hickman	55.81
8	(Canada) Eddie Parenti	55.87

=== 200m butterfly ===
Pos	Athlete	Time
1	(New Zealand) Danyon Loader	1:59.54
2	(Australia) Scott Miller	1:59.70
3	(England) James Hickman	2:00.87
4	(Australia) Bill Kirby	2:01.00
5	(Canada) Eddie Parenti	2:01.26
6	(Canada) Dino Verbrugge	2:02.94
7	(England) Kevin Crosby	2:04.09
8	(Wales) Michael Watkins	2:04.19

=== 200m medley ===
Pos	Athlete	Time
1	(Australia) Matt Dunn	2:02.28
2	(Canada) Curtis Myden	2:03.47
3	(Scotland) Fraser Walker	2:04.28
4	(Canada) Gary Anderson	2:05.10
5	(Australia) Robert Van Der Zant	2:05.55
6	(Canada) Mark Versfeld	2:05.82
7	(Scotland) Jonathan Kerr	2:07.20
8	(Australia) Hamish Cameron	2:07.98

=== 400m medley ===
Pos	Athlete	Time
1	(Australia) Matt Dunn	4:17.01
2	(Canada) Curtis Myden	4:17.73
3	(Australia) Philip Bryant	4:21.34
4	(Canada) Owen Von Richter	4:23.39
5	(Canada) Stephen Baird	4:27.55
6	(Australia) Hamish Cameron	4:28.44
7	(New Zealand) John Munro	4:29.74
8	(Scotland) Jonathan Kerr	4:31.45

=== 4 × 100 m freestyle relay ===
Pos	Athlete	Time
1	(Australia) Baildon, Fydler, Lange, Sheehan	3:20.89
2	(New Zealand) Loader, Steel, Tongue, Bray	3:21.79
3	(England) Clayton, Foster, Fibbens, Shackell	3:22.61
4	(Canada) Brankis, Watson, Clarke, Vandermeulen	3:23.02
5	(South Africa) Albertyn, Tiltman, Fryer, Williams	3:27.30
6	(Scotland) Aitken, Stewart, Walker, Hunter	3:35.03
7	(Bermuda) Mewett, Harris, Fahy, Ferguson	3:41.71
8	(Saint Lucia) Brown, Charles, Clarke, Johnny	4:08.95

=== 4 × 200 m freestyle relay ===
Pos	Athlete	Time
1	(Australia) Housman, Perkins, Roberts, Dunn	7:20.80
2	(New Zealand) Loader, Callaghan, Steel, Bray	7:21.67
3	(England) Clayton, Salter, Shackell, Mellor	7:26.19
4	(Canada) Parenti, von Richter, Clarke, O'Hare	7:26.70
5	(South Africa) Fryer, Albertyn, Morrison, Tiltman	7:42.28
6	(Wales) C. Jones, Lundie, M. Jones, Watkins	7:57.70

=== 4 × 100 m medley relay ===
Pos	Athlete	Time
1	(Australia) Fydler, Rogers, Miller, Dewick	3:40.41
2	(Canada) Renaud, Cleveland, Braknis, Clarke	3:43.25
3	(England) Hickman, Harris, Gillingham, Shackell	3:43.72
4	(New Zealand) Ford, Loader, Kent, Bray	3:46.02
5	(South Africa) Albertyn, Louw, Fryer, Verster	3:54.58
6	(Wales) Ayers, C. Jones, M. Jones, Watkins	3:54.93
7	(Scotland) Aitken, Stewart, Hunter, Hudghton	3:55.45
8	(Bermuda) Flook, Mewett, Harris, Fahy	4:03.38

== Finals (women) ==
=== 50m freestyle ===
Pos	Athlete	Time
1	(Australia) Karen Van Wirdum	25.90
2	(Canada) Andrea Nugent	26.24
3	(Canada) Shannon Shakespeare	26.27
4	(Australia) Sarah Ryan	26.32
5	(England) Sue Rolph	26.49
6	(New Zealand) Toni Jeffs	26.62
7	(Scotland) Alison Sheppard	26.69
8	(Namibia) Monica Dahl	27.09

=== 100m freestyle ===
Pos	Athlete	Time
1	(England) Karen Pickering	56.20
2	(Australia) Karen Van Wirdum	56.42
3	(Canada) Marianne Limpert	56.44
4	(Australia) Sarah Ryan	56.55
5	(Australia) Susie O'Neill	56.56
6	(England) Sue Rolph	56.73
7	(Canada) Shannon Shakespeare	56.75
8	(Canada) Jessica Amey	57.79

=== 200m freestyle ===
Pos	Athlete	Time
1	(Australia) Susie O'Neill	2:00.86
2	(Australia) Nicole Stevenson	2:01.34
3	(England) Karen Pickering	2:01.50
4	(Australia) Anna Windsor	2:01.91
5	(England) Alex Bennett	2:02.16
6	(Canada) Marianne Limpert	2:03.23
7	(Canada) Stephanie Richardson	2:04.27
8	(Canada) Donna Wu	2:06.43

=== 400m freestyle ===
Pos	Athlete	Time
1	(Australia) Hayley Lewis	4:12.56
2	(Australia) Stacey Gartrell	4:13.06
3	(England) Sarah Hardcastle	4:13.29
4	(Canada) Nikki Dryden	4:13.49
5	(Australia) Julie Majer	4:16.45
6	(New Zealand) Phillippa Langrell	4:16.95
7	(Canada) Joanne Currah	4:18.02
8	(Canada) Stephanie Richardson	4:19.30

=== 800m freestyle ===
Pos	Athlete	Time
1	(Australia) Stacey Gartrell	8:30.18
2	(Australia) Hayley Lewis	8:30.72
3	(Canada) Nikki Dryden	8:37.70
4	(New Zealand) Phillippa Langrell	8:40.35
5	(England) Sarah Hardcastle	8:41.62
6	(Australia) Julie Majer	8:45.41
7	(Canada) Stephanie Richardson	8:57.79
8	(South Africa) Karen Allers	9:06.16

=== 100m backstroke ===
Pos	Athlete	Time
1	(Australia) Nicole Stevenson	1:02.68
2	(Australia) Elli Overton	1:02.90
3	(England) Kathy Osher	1:03.27
4	(South Africa) Marianne Kriel	1:03.61
5	(New Zealand) Anna Simcic	1:03.91
6	(England) Beth Hazel	1:03.95
7	(Canada) Julie Howard	1:04.03
7	(England) Emma Tattam	1:04.03

=== 200m backstroke ===
Pos	Athlete	Time
1	(Australia) Nicole Stevenson	2:12.73
2	(New Zealand) Anna Simcic	2:13.94
3	(Australia) Elli Overton	2:14.96
4	(Canada) Beth Hazel	2:15.24
5	(Canada) Suzanne Weckend	2:15.94
6	(England) Kathy Osher	2:16.25
7	(Canada) Nikki Dryden	2:16.69
8	(South Africa) Jill Brukman	2:17.64

=== 100m breaststroke ===
Pos	Athlete	Time
1	(Australia) Samantha Riley	1:08.02
2	(Australia) Rebecca Brown	1:09.40
3	(South Africa) Penny Heyns	1:09.86
4	(Canada) Lisa Flood	1:10.39
5	(Canada) Guylaine Cloutier	1:10.53
6	(Australia) Debby Wade	1:11.03
7	(England) Marie Hardiman	1:12.36
8	(England) Jaime King	1:12.87

=== 200m breaststroke ===
Pos	Athlete	Time
1	(Australia) Samantha Riley	2:25.53
2	(Australia) Rebecca Brown	2:30.24
3	(Canada) Lisa Flood	2:31.85
4	(Australia) Brooke Hanson	2:32.26
5	(Canada) Guylaine Cloutier	2:32.28
6	(England) Marie Hardiman	2:32.65
7	(South Africa) Penny Heyns	2:33.57
8	(England) Jaime King	2:37.77

=== 100m butterfly ===
Pos	Athlete	Time
1	(Australia) Petria Thomas	1:00.21
2	(Australia) Susie O'Neill	1:00.24
3	(Australia) Elli Overton	1:01.88
4	(Singapore) Joscelin Yeo	1:02.23
5	(England) Alex Bennett	1:02.26
6	(Canada) Shona Kitson	1:02.72
7	(Canada) Jessica Amey	1:02.74
8	(Northern Ireland) Marion Madine	1:03.02

=== 200m butterfly ===
Pos	Athlete	Time
1	(Australia) Susie O'Neill	2:09.96
2	(Australia) Hayley Lewis	2:12.21
3	(Australia) Julie Majer	2:12.43
4	(Northern Ireland) Marion Madine	2:15.44
5	(England) Helen Slatter	2:16.15
6	(England) Alex Bennett	2:18.23
7	(Canada) Joanne Malar	2:18.44
8	(Canada) Shona Kitson	2:19.53

=== 200m medley ===
Pos	Athlete	Time
1	(Australia) Elli Overton	2:15.59
2	(Canada) Marianne Limpert	2:15.97
3	(Canada) Nancy Sweetnam	2:16.67
4	(Canada) Joanne Malar	2:17.51
5	(New Zealand) Anna Wilson	2:18.93
6	(Australia) Anna Windsor	2:19.14
7	(Australia) Jacqueline McKenzie	2:20.90
8	(England) Sue Rolph	2:22.27

=== 400m medley ===
Pos	Athlete	Time
1	(Australia) Elli Overton	4:44.01
2	(Canada) Nancy Sweetnam	4:46.20
3	(Australia) Hayley Lewis	4:46.62
4	(Australia) Julie Majer	4:47.69
5	(Canada) Joanne Malar	4:48.26
6	(New Zealand) Anna Wilson	4:48.63
7	(England) Helen Slatter	4:58.33
8	(Canada) Christine Jeffrey	5:03.64

=== 4 × 100 m freestyle relay ===
Pos	Athlete	Time
1	(England) Bennett, Huddart, Pickering, Rolph	3:46.23
2	(Australia) Overton, van Wirdum, Ryan, O'Neill	3:46.73
3	(Canada) Maughan, Amey, Limpert, Shakespeare	3:47.25
4	(South Africa) Hunter-Beckinsall, Elliott, Allers, Kriel	3:55.01
5	(Wales) Niblett, Lock, Hopkins, Hale	3:58.15

=== 4 × 200 m freestyle relay ===
Pos	Athlete	Time
1	(Australia) Windsor, Lewis, Stevenson, O'Neill	8:08.06
2	(England) Bennett, Huddart, Pickering, Hardcastle	8:09.62
3	(Canada) Wu, Malar, Limpert, Richardson	8:14.97
4	(South Africa) Hunter-Beckinsall, Bruckman, Allers, Kriel	8:34.10

=== 4 × 100 m medley relay ===
Pos	Athlete	Time
1	(Australia) Riley, van Wirdum, Thomas, Stevenson	4:07.89
2	(England) Bennett, Pickering, Osher, Hardiman	4:12.83
3	(Canada) Hazel, Amey, Flood, Limpert	4:14.04
4	(South Africa) Kriel, Heyns, Loots, Hunter-Beckinsall	4:16.28
5	(New Zealand) Simcic, Wilson, Langrell, Jeffs	disq
