= 1993 Pan Pacific Swimming Championships – Men's 100 metre freestyle =

Men's 100 metre freestyle at the 1993 Pan Pacific Swimming Championships
- Venue: Port Island Sports Center
- Dates: August 13, 1993 (heats & finals)
- Competitors: 34 from 12 nations
- Winning time: 49.73

Medalists
gold medal	Jon Olsen	United States
silver medal	Chris Fydler	Australia
bronze medal	John Steel	New Zealand

The men's 100 metre freestyle competition at the 1993 Pan Pacific Swimming Championships took place on August 13 at the Port Island Sports Center. The last champion was Matt Biondi of USA.

This race consisted of two lengths of the pool, both lengths being in freestyle.

== Records ==
Prior to this competition, the existing world and Pan Pacific records were as follows:

World record	Matt Biondi (USA)	48.42	Austin, United States	August 10, 1988
Pan Pacific Championships record	Matt Biondi (USA)	49.17	Tokyo, Japan	August 16, 1985

== Results ==
All times are in minutes and seconds.

KEY:	q	Fastest non-qualifiers	Q	Qualified	CR	Championships record	NR	National record	PB	Personal best	SB	Seasonal best

=== Heats ===
The first round was held on August 13.

Rank	Name	Nationality	Time	Notes
1	Joe Hudepohl	United States	49.58	QA
2	Jon Olsen	United States	49.62	QA
3	John Steel	New Zealand	50.12	QA
4	Seth Pepper	United States	50.53	QA
5	Chris Fydler	Australia	50.66	QA
6	Andrew Baildon	Australia	50.67	QA
7	David Fox	United States	51.26	QA
8	Josh Davis	United States	51.31	QA
9	Darren Lange	Australia	51.34	QB
10	Chris Eckerman	United States	51.34	QB
11	Brian Retterer	United States	51.37	QB
12	Stephen Clarke	Canada	51.52	QB
13	Dwade Sheehan	Australia	51.71	QB
14	Trent Bray	New Zealand	51.73	QB
15	Dean Kondziolka	Canada	51.82	QB
16	Sebastien Goulet	Canada	51.85	QB
17	Mark Henderson	United States	51.92	
18	Robert Braknis	Canada	51.93	
19	Hiroshi Fukuda	Japan	52.11	
20	Hajime Oono	Japan	52.19	
21	Masakatsu Usami	Japan	52.37	
22	Adam Vary	Australia	52.38	
23	Deane Pieters	Australia	52.40	
24	Felipe Delgado	Ecuador	52.42	
25	Wisnu Wardhana	Indonesia	52.66	
26	Sergey Borisenko	Kazakhstan	52.74	
27	Alexey Yegorov	Kazakhstan	52.78	
28	Taihei Maeda	Japan	52.95	
29	Dong-Hyeon Kim	South Korea	53.09	
30	Ki-Taek Kang	South Korea	53.50	
31	Michael Wright	Hong Kong	53.67	
32	Patrick Sagisi	Guam	53.95	
33	Raymond Papa	Philippines	54.09	
34	Darrick Bollinger	Guam	54.56	

=== B Final ===
The B final was held on August 13.

Rank	Name	Nationality	Time	Notes
9	Seth Pepper	United States	50.24	
10	Darren Lange	Australia	51.40	
11	Sebastien Goulet	Canada	51.62	
12	Hajime Oono	Japan	52.40	
13	Hiroshi Fukuda	Japan	52.44	
14	Masakatsu Usami	Japan	52.67	
15	Wisnu Wardhana	Indonesia	52.70	
16	Felipe Delgado	Ecuador	52.81	

=== A Final ===
The A final was held on August 13.

Rank	Lane	Nationality	Time	Notes
1st place, gold medalist(s)	Jon Olsen	United States	49.73	
2nd place, silver medalist(s)	Chris Fydler	Australia	50.02	
3rd place, bronze medalist(s)	John Steel	New Zealand	50.12	
4	Joe Hudepohl	United States	50.13	
5	Andrew Baildon	Australia	50.45	
6	Dean Kondziolka	Canada	51.48	
7	Stephen Clarke	Canada	51.95	
8	Trent Bray	New Zealand	52.21	
