= 1993 Pan Pacific Swimming Championships – Men's 50 metre freestyle =

Men's 50 metre freestyle at the 1993 Pan Pacific Swimming Championships
- Venue: Port Island Sports Center
- Dates: August 15, 1993 (heats & finals)
- Competitors: 30 from 12 nations
- Winning time: 22.68

Medalists
| gold medal | Jon Olsen | United States |
| silver medal | Joe Hudepohl | United States |
| bronze medal | Dean Kondziolka | Canada |

The men's 50 metre freestyle competition at the 1993 Pan Pacific Swimming Championships took place on August 15 at the Port Island Sports Center. The last champion was Tom Jager of US.

This race consisted of one length of the pool in freestyle.

== Records ==
Prior to this competition, the existing world and Pan Pacific records were as follows:

| World record | Tom Jager (USA) | 21.81 | Nashville, United States | March 24, 1990 |
| Pan Pacific Championships record | Tom Jager (USA) | 22.12 | Tokyo, Japan | August 20, 1989 |

== Results ==
All times are in minutes and seconds.

| KEY: | q | Fastest non-qualifiers | Q | Qualified | CR | Championships record | NR | National record | PB | Personal best | SB | Seasonal best |

=== Heats ===
The first round was held on August 15.

| Rank | Name | Nationality | Time | Notes |
|---|---|---|---|---|
| 1 | Jon Olsen | United States | 22.80 | QA |
| 2 | Joe Hudepohl | United States | 22.83 | QA |
| 3 | David Fox | United States | 23.01 | QA |
| 4 | Seth Pepper | United States | 23.05 | QA |
| 5 | Darren Lange | Australia | 23.10 | QA |
| 6 | Andrew Baildon | Australia | 23.19 | QA |
| 7 | Dean Kondziolka | Canada | 23.23 | QA |
| 8 | Chris Fydler | Australia | 23.37 | QA |
| 9 | Brian Retterer | United States | 23.43 | QB |
| 10 | Mark Henderson | United States | 23.45 | QB |
| 11 | Sergey Borisenko | Kazakhstan | 23.48 | QB |
| 12 | Dwade Sheehan | Australia | 23.53 | QB |
| 13 | Adam Vary | Australia | 23.60 | QB |
| 14 | Robert Braknis | Canada | 23.64 | QB |
| 15 | Felipe Delgado | Ecuador | 23.67 | QB |
| 16 | Josh Davis | United States | 23.68 | QB |
| 17 | John Steel | New Zealand | 23.79 | |
| 18 | Masakatsu Usami | Japan | 23.81 | |
| 19 | Hajime Oono | Japan | 23.87 | |
| 20 | Justin Finney | Canada | 23.93 | |
| 21 | Chris Eckerman | United States | 23.99 | |
| 22 | Tripp Schwenk | United States | 24.02 | |
| 23 | Stephen Clarke | Canada | 24.11 | |
| 24 | Michael Wright | Hong Kong | 24.44 | |
| 25 | Ki-Taek Kang | South Korea | 24.46 | |
| 26 | Wisnu Wardhana | Indonesia | 24.51 | |
| 27 | Patrick Sagisi | Guam | 24.72 | |
| 28 | Darrick Bollinger | Guam | 24.74 | |
| 29 | Hiroshi Fukuda | Japan | 24.75 | |
| 30 | Raymond Papa | Philippines | 24.78 | |

=== B Final ===
The B final was held on August 15.

| Rank | Name | Nationality | Time | Notes |
|---|---|---|---|---|
| 9 | Seth Pepper | United States | 22.96 | |
| 10 | Dwade Sheehan | Australia | 23.32 | |
| 11 | John Steel | New Zealand | 23.60 | |
| 12 | Masakatsu Usami | Japan | 23.97 | |
| 13 | Michael Wright | Hong Kong | 24.12 | |
| 14 | Justin Finney | Canada | 24.16 | |
| 15 | Ki-Taek Kang | South Korea | 24.40 | |
| - | Wisnu Wardhana | Indonesia | DSQ | |

=== A Final ===
The A final was held on August 15.

| Rank | Lane | Nationality | Time | Notes |
|---|---|---|---|---|
| 1st place, gold medalist(s) | Jon Olsen | United States | 22.68 | |
| 2nd place, silver medalist(s) | Joe Hudepohl | United States | 22.95 | |
| 3rd place, bronze medalist(s) | Dean Kondziolka | Canada | 23.16 | |
| 4 | Darren Lange | Australia | 23.17 | |
| 5 | Andrew Baildon | Australia | 23.19 | |
| 6 | Sergey Borisenko | Kazakhstan | 23.33 | |
| 7 | Robert Braknis | Canada | 23.52 | |
| 8 | Felipe Delgado | Ecuador | 23.60 | |
