= 1991 Pan Pacific Swimming Championships – Men's 100 metre freestyle =

Men's 100 metre freestyle at the 1991 Pan Pacific Swimming Championships
- Venue: Kinsmen Sports Center
- Dates: August 23, 1991 (heats & finals)
- Competitors: 34 from 9 nations
- Winning time: 49.72

Medalists
gold medal	Matt Biondi	United States
silver medal	Chris Fydler	Australia
bronze medal	Shaun Jordan	United States

The men's 100 metre freestyle competition at the 1991 Pan Pacific Swimming Championships took place on August 23 at the Kinsmen Sports Center. The last champion was Brent Lang of US.

This race consisted of two lengths of the pool, both lengths being in freestyle.

== Records ==
Prior to this competition, the existing world and Pan Pacific records were as follows:

World record	Matt Biondi (USA)	48.42	Austin, United States	August 10, 1988
Pan Pacific Championships record	Matt Biondi (USA)	49.17	Tokyo, Japan	August 16, 1985

== Results ==
All times are in minutes and seconds.

KEY:	q	Fastest non-qualifiers	Q	Qualified	CR	Championships record	NR	National record	PB	Personal best	SB	Seasonal best

=== Heats ===
The first round was held on August 23.

Rank	Name	Nationality	Time	Notes
1	Matt Biondi	United States	49.51	QA
2	Shaun Jordan	United States	49.90	QA
3	Jon Olsen	United States	50.14	QA
4	Chris Fydler	Australia	50.15	QA
5	Tom Jager	United States	50.22	QA
6	Joe Hudepohl	United States	50.43	QA
7	Troy Dalbey	United States	50.79	QA
8	John Steel	New Zealand	50.94	QA
9	Andrew Baildon	Australia	51.04	QB
10	Matthew Renshaw	Australia	51.08	QB
11	Sandy Goss	Canada	51.18	QB
12	Tsutomu Nakano	Japan	51.37	QB
12	Darren Lange	Australia	51.37	QB
14	Qiu Jieming	China	51.59	QB
15	Nick Sanders	New Zealand	51.67	QB
16	Sebastien Goulet	Canada	51.71	QB
17	Ron Watson	Canada	51.76	
18	Melvin Stewart	United States	51.85	
19	Michael Wright	Hong Kong	51.89	
20	Dean Kondziolka	Canada	51.97	
21	Robert Abernethy	Australia	52.04	
22	Arthur Li	Hong Kong	52.06	
23	Richard Bera	Indonesia	52.34	
24	Masakatsu Usami	Japan	52.41	
25	Mark Weldon	New Zealand	52.43	
26	Robert Braknis	Canada	52.46	
27	Frank Samel	Canada	52.49	
27	Deane Pieters	Australia	52.49	
29	Trent Bray	New Zealand	52.52	
30	Ian Brown	Australia	52.62	
31	Satoshi Kajitani	Japan	52.75	
32	Taihei Maeda	Japan	52.88	
33	Yi-Chung Chen	Chinese Taipei	53.34	
34	Hidetoshi Yamanaka	Japan	54.01	

=== B Final ===
The B final was held on August 23.

Rank	Name	Nationality	Time	Notes
9	Jon Olsen	United States	50.30	
10	Matthew Renshaw	Australia	51.11	
11	Nick Sanders	New Zealand	51.67	
12	Sebastien Goulet	Canada	51.78	
13	Michael Wright	Hong Kong	51.99	
14	Arthur Li	Hong Kong	52.11	
15	Ron Watson	Canada	52.27	
16	Richard Bera	Indonesia	52.97	

=== A Final ===
The A final was held on August 23.

Rank	Lane	Nationality	Time	Notes
1st place, gold medalist(s)	Matt Biondi	United States	49.72	
2nd place, silver medalist(s)	Chris Fydler	Australia	50.21	
3rd place, bronze medalist(s)	Shaun Jordan	United States	50.38	
4	John Steel	New Zealand	50.90	
5	Andrew Baildon	Australia	51.08	
6	Tsutomu Nakano	Japan	51.60	
7	Sandy Goss	Canada	51.72	
8	Qiu Jieming	China	52.42	
