= 1992 Australian Short Course Swimming Championships =

The 1992 Australian Short Course Swimming Championships were held in Darwin, Northern Territory from 25 to 27 September at Casuarina Pool. They were organised by Australian Swimming.

== Medal winners ==
=== Men's events ===
Event	Gold		Silver		Bronze	
50 m freestyle						
100 m freestyle	<Ian VanderWal>	<Northern Territory>				
200 m freestyle	Malcolm Allen (NSW)	1:50.18	Deane Pieters (WA)	1:51.17	Cameron Anderson (NSW)	1:51.49
400 m freestyle						
800 m freestyle	Daniel Kowalski (SA)	7:54.85	Mark Sheppard (SA)	8:18.08	Justin Helmich (Tas)	8:18.13
1500 m freestyle	Daniel Kowalski (SA)	14:54.25	Mark Sheppard (SA)		Warren Wild (WA)	
50 m backstroke	Thomas Stachewicz (WA)	26.69	Martin Roberts (SA)	26.70	Steven Dewick (NSW)	26.81
100 m backstroke						
200 m backstroke						
50 m breaststroke	Phil Rogers (SA)	28.67	Robert van der Zant (Qld)		Dwade Sheehan (Qld)	
100 m breaststroke	Phil Rogers (SA)	1:02.26	Adam Oleson (NSW)	1:03.89	Robert van der Zant (Qld)	1:03.90
200 m breaststroke						
50 m butterfly	<Ian VanderWal>	<Northern Territory>				
100 m butterfly	Scott Miller (NSW)	55.34	David Wilson (Vic)	55.45	Adam Vary (Qld)	56.39
200 m butterfly	Matthew Brown (NSW)	2:01.62				
100 m individual medley						
200 m individual medley	Matthew Dunn (NSW)	2:02.20	Robert van der Zant (Qld)	2:04.59	Hamish Cameron (Qld)	2:05.27
400 m individual medley						
4 × 100 m freestyle relay						
4 × 200 m freestyle relay						
4 × 100 m medley relay						

Legend: WR – World record; CR – Commonwealth record; OR – Oceanian record; AR – Australian record; ACR – Australian All Comers record; Club – Australian Club record

=== Women's events ===
Event	Gold		Silver		Bronze	
50 m freestyle						
100 m freestyle	<Susan Smith>		<Sarah Ryan>			
200 m freestyle	Toni Greaves (NSW)	2:01.37	Penny O'Connell (Vic)	2:01.42	Dionne Bainbridge (Qld)	2:02.34
400 m freestyle						
800 m freestyle	Stacey Gartrell (NSW)	8:27.92	Toni Greaves (NSW)		Chloe Flutter (NSW)	
1500 m freestyle	Stacey Gartrell (NSW)	15:58.61; AR	Belinda Curtin (NSW)	16:46.01	Michelle Gallen (NSW)	16:55.23
50 m backstroke	Meredith Smith (NSW)	29.57	Nicole Stevenson (Vic)	29.74	Angela Kennedy (NSW)	30.00
100 m backstroke						
200 m backstroke	Meredith Smith (NSW)	2:11.45	Leigh Habler (NSW)		Jodie Clatworthy (Qld)	
50 m breaststroke	Linley Frame (Vic)	33.23	Tammy Alder (NSW)		Rebecca Brown (Qld)	
100 m breaststroke	Linley Frame (Vic)	1:11.29	Tammy Alder (NSW)	1:06.14	Rebecca Brown (Qld)	1:12.11
200 m breaststroke						
50 m butterfly						
100 m butterfly	Angela Kennedy (NSW)	1:02.59	Nichola Yates (WA)	1:03.92	Angela Mathew (NSW)	1:04.28
200 m butterfly						
100 m individual medley						
200 m individual medley	Jacqueline McKenzie (WA)	2:16.76	Angela Kennedy (NSW)	2:17.24	Tammy Alder (NSW)	2:17.25
400 m individual medley						
4 × 100 m freestyle relay						
4 × 200 m freestyle relay						
4 × 100 m medley relay						

Legend: WR – World record; CR – Commonwealth record; OR – Oceanian record; AR – Australian record; ACR – Australian All Comers record; Club – Australian Club record

== See also ==
- 1992 in swimming
- 1992 Australian Swimming Championships
