= Paul Kent =

Paul Kent may refer to:

- Paul Kent (actor) (1930–2011), American actor
- Paul Kent (journalist) (born 1969), Australian journalist and former rugby player
- Paul Kent (swimmer) (born 1972), New Zealand swimmer
