= Tishani Doshi =

Indian writer (born 1975)

Tishani Doshi FRSL
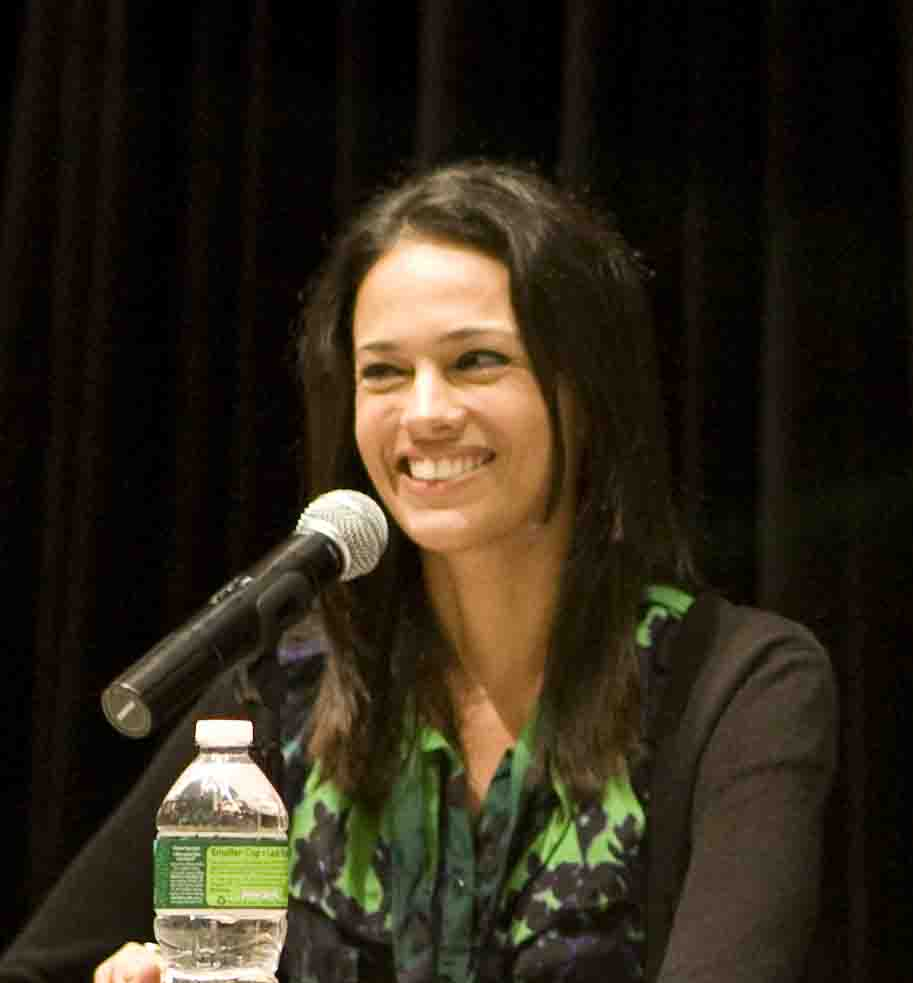
- Doshi at the Brooklyn Book Festival
- Born: 9 December 1975 (age 50); Chennai, India
- Citizenship: India
- Education: Queens University of Charlotte (BS); Johns Hopkins University (MA)
- Occupations: Poet, writer, dancer
- Spouse: Carlo Pizzati
- Writing career
- Period: 2006–present
- Notable works: Small Days and Nights; Countries of the Body
- Notable awards: Forward Prize (2006)
- Website: www.tishanidoshi.com

Tishani Doshi FRSL (born 9 December 1975) is an Indian poet, journalist and dancer based in Chennai. In 2006, she won the Forward Prize for Best First Collection for Countries of the Body. Her poetry book A God at the Door was later shortlisted for the 2021 Forward Prize for Best Collection. She was elected a Fellow of the Royal Society of Literature in 2023.

== Early life and education ==
Doshi was born in Madras, Tamil Nadu, India, to a Welsh mother and Gujarati father. She completed a bachelor's degree in the United States, at Queens University of Charlotte. She graduated with a master's degree in creative writing from the Johns Hopkins University.

== Career ==
Doshi works as a freelance writer and journalist. She has worked with choreographer Chandralekha. Her short story "Lady Cassandra, Spartacus and the Dancing man" was published in its entirety in the journal The Drawbridge in 2007. Her poetry collection, Everything Begins Elsewhere, was published by Bloodaxe Books in the UK in 2012 and by Copper Canyon Press in the US in 2013.

== Award winning works ==
In 2001, Doshi won the Eric Gregory Award for young poets under 30 years. Doshi's first poetry collection, Countries of the Body, was launched in 2006 at the Hay Festival on a platform with Seamus Heaney, Margaret Atwood, and others. The opening poem, "The Day We Went to the Sea", won the 2005 British Council-supported All India Poetry Prize. The book won the 2006 Forward Prize for best first collection. Her first novel, The Pleasure Seekers, was published by Bloomsbury in 2010. It was long-listed for the Orange Prize in 2011, and also shortlisted for The Hindu Literary Prize in 2010.

Her poetry book Girls Are Coming Out of the Woods was a Poetry Book Society Recommendation and was shortlisted for the Ted Hughes Award in 2018. Her 2019 book, Small Days and Nights, was shortlisted for the 2020 Ondaatje Prize.

Doshi has been a finalist at Outlook-Picador Non-Fiction Competition. She also received honorary invitation to the poetry galas of Hay Festival of 2006 and Cartagena Hay Festival of 2007.

== Other activities ==
Doshi delivered the keynote address at the 13th annual St. Martin Book Fair on the Caribbean island country of Sint Maarten (Saint Martin) in 2015. Her book The Adulterous Citizen: Poems, Stories, Essays (2015) was launched at the festival by House of Nehesi Publishers.

She writes a blog titled "Hit or Miss" on ESPNcricinfo, a cricket-related website. In the blog, which she started writing in April 2009, Doshi makes observations and commentaries as a television viewer of the second season of the Indian Premier League. She is also collaborating with cricketer Muttiah Muralitharan on his biography, to be published when he retires.

== Books ==
- 2006: Countries of the Body (poetry) ISBN 9781899179077
- 2008: Conflict and Instability (with [Tobias Hill] and Aoife Mannix) ISBN 9780312172541
- 2010: The Pleasure Seekers (fiction) ISBN 9781408815441
- 2012: Everything Begins Elsewhere (poetry), Bloodaxe Books, UK, 2012; Copper Canyon Press, United States, 2013. ISBN 9781322641911
- 2013: Fountainville (fiction), Seren Books ISBN 9781781721087
- 2013: Madras Then, Chennai Now (with Nanditha Krishna) ISBN 9788174369147
- 2015: The Adulterous Citizen: Poems, Stories, Essays (House of Nehesi Publishers) ISBN 9780996224222
- 2017: Girls Are Coming out of the Woods (poetry), HarperCollins, India; Bloodaxe Books, UK, 2018: Copper Canyon Press, United States, 2018. ISBN 9781556595509
- 2019: Small Days and Nights (Bloomsbury) ISBN 9781324005230
- 2021: A God at the Door ISBN 9781556594526
- 2026: Egrets, While War
