= Alex Bennett (swimmer) =

English swimmer (born 1977)

Personal information
- Born: 1977

Sport
- Sport: Swimming
- Club: Nova Centurian
Medal record
Swimming
Representing England
Commonwealth Games
| Gold medal – first place | 1994 Victoria | 4x100m freestyle relay |
| Silver medal – second place | 1994 Victoria | 4x200m freestyle relay |
| Silver medal – second place | 1994 Victoria | 4x100m medley relay |

Alexandra Bennett (married name Alexandra Kelham; born 1977) is a female English former competitive swimmer.

== Early life ==
She lived in Bleasby, Nottinghamshire, and attended Southwell Minster School.

== Swimming career ==
Bennett represented England in seven events at the 1994 Commonwealth Games in Victoria, British Columbia, Canada, which included three medals; a gold medal in the 4 × 100 m freestyle relay with Claire Huddart, Karen Pickering and Sue Rolph, and two silver medals in the 4 × 200 m freestyle relay and 4 × 100 m medley relay.

She missed out on the chance to compete at the 1996 Olympic Games after a serious car accident, in which she broke both of her legs. She had the accident on Monday February 5 1996 at Thurgarton crossroads, and had to have a ten-hour operation in the Queen's Medical Centre.

== Personal life ==
She is a lawyer by trade.
