= Stephen Mellor =

Stephen, Steven, or Steve Mellor may refer to:

- Stephen J. Mellor (also known as Steve Mellor), computer scientist
- Steven Mellor (swimmer) (also known as Steve Mellor), British Olympic swimmer
