= Alex Shackell =

American swimmer (born 2006)

Personal information
- Born: November 13, 2006 (age 19) Carmel, Indiana, U.S.

Sport
- Country: United States
- Sport: Women's swimming
- Strokes: Butterfly, Freestyle
- Club: Carmel Swim Club (CSC)
- College team: Indiana University
- Coach: Chris Plumb (Carmel High, Carmel Swim Club)
Medal record
Women's swimming
Representing United States
Olympic Games
Gold medal – first place	2024 Paris	4 × 100 m medley
Silver medal – second place	2024 Paris	4×200 m freestyle
World Championships (SC)
Gold medal – first place	2024 Budapest	4×100 m freestyle
Gold medal – first place	2024 Budapest	4×100 m medley
Silver medal – second place	2024 Budapest	4×100 m mixed medley
Bronze medal – third place	2024 Budapest	4×50 m mixed medley

Alex Shackell (born November 13, 2006) is an American swimmer who competed for Carmel High School and was a member of the United States team for the 2024 Summer Olympics. She won a silver and a gold medal swimming the butterfly leg in medley relays at the 2024 Paris Olympics.

== Early life and swimming ==
Shackell was born on November 13, 2006, in Carmel, Indiana. Graduating in June 2025, she attended Carmel High School and swam for their exceptional swimming program under Coach Chris Plumb. Shackell won the 100-yard butterfly event at the Indiana High School Athletic Association annual championship meet all four years of her High School participation. From an accomplished family of swimmers, Shackell's father, Nicholas Shackell, was an Olympic swimmer, representing Great Britain at the 1996 Summer Olympics in the 100m freestyle, and also swam for Britain in the 2000 Olympics. Shackell's older brother Aaron competed in the 400 freestyle event at the 2024 Olympics. Considered by a few sports historians to be the greatest team ever assembled, by 2023, the Carmel High girls' team had won 37 consecutive Indiana State championships. In addition to Alex, three other Carmel swimmers, Kayla Han, Lynsey Bowen, and Molly Sweeney, won medals in international competition in 2023. Chris Plumb coached Shackell while swimming and training for Carmel High, and was also her coach with the Carmel Swim Club.

She set a state record of 51.71 in the 100-yard butterfly at the 2022 Girls Swimming and Diving State Tournament at Indiana University in Indianapolis.

== International competition highlights ==
At the 2021 Winter Junior Nationals, Shackell swam a 51.22 in the 100 butterfly, the second-best time for 15 to 16 year-olds ever recorded in Junior competition. In 2021, she won an Indiana State title in the 100-yard butterfly with a time of 51.71.

At the FINA World Cup in Indianapolis in 2022, she was third in the 200-meter fly with a 2:05.18, and in the 100-meter fly also placed third with a 56.63.

At the 2023 World Aquatic Championships in Fukuoka, Shackell swam the anchor leg of the 4x200 freestyle relay finals, leading the team to a silver medal, finishing second to the strong Australian Women's team.

In the 2024 World Championships in Budapest, Shackell captured a gold and a silver medal in the Women's 4x100 meter medley and the mixed 4x100 meter medley. She took another gold in the 4x100 meter freestyle relay. In shorter medley relay competition, she earned a bronze in the 4x50 mixed medley.

== 2024 Paris Olympics ==
=== Trials ===
As a 17-year-old, Shackell qualified for the U.S. Olympic team at the 2024 US Olympic Swimming Team Trials in Indianapolis. Before a large crowd at Lucas Oil Stadium, Shackell finished second to Regan Smith in the 200 butterfly trial finals with a time of 2:06.69, ensuring her a place on the U.S. Women's Olympic team. She became the first Carmel High swimmer to qualify for the Olympics. She had conditionally won a place on the Women's Olympic team earlier when she placed sixth in the finals of the 200 meter freestyle with a time of 1:57.05, though her qualification would be dependent on the size of the women's Olympic roster.

=== 2024 Olympics ===
At the 2024 Paris Olympics, she won a silver medal in the Women's 4×200 m freestyle relay for swimming in the preliminary heat, as the U.S. team without Shackell finished second to Australia in the final.

In the last event in swimming competition, the Women's 4 × 100 m medley relay, Shackell swam the butterfly leg in the morning preliminary heats, as the top two finishers in the women's 100m butterfly race, Gretchen Walsh and Torri Huske, later swam the butterfly and freestyle legs in the final. The gold medal performance by the U.S. women's team in the final clinched a gold medal for Shackell for her preliminary leg. In her 200m butterfly event, she advanced through the preliminaries and semi-finals and finished sixth in the championship final with a time of 2:07.73, placing her out of medal contention.

In 2025, Shackell committed to attend and swim for Indiana University under Head Coach Ray Looze, beginning in January 2026. She had strongly considered the University of California Berkeley, but wanted to remain in Indiana and continue training with her longtime coach Chris Plumb at the Carmel Swim Club when time permitted.
