= Marie Hardiman =

British swimmer

Personal information
- Full name: Marie Hardiman
- National team: Great Britain
- Born: 21 July 1975 (age 50) Walsall, England
- Height: 1.68 m (5 ft 6 in)
- Weight: 55 kg (121 lb; 8.7 st)

Sport
- Sport: Swimming
- Strokes: Breaststroke
- Club: City of Birmingham SC
Medal record
Women's swimming
Representing England
Commonwealth Games
Silver medal – second place	1994 Victoria	medley relay
Representing Great Britain
European Championships
Bronze medal – third place	1993 Sheffield	200 m breaststroke

Marie Hardiman (born 21 July 1975) is a female English former competitive swimmer.

== Early life ==
She attended St Francis of Assisi Catholic College.

== Swimming career ==
Hardiman won a bronze medal in the 200-metre breaststroke at the 1993 European Aquatics Championships. She finished 14th in the same event at the 1996 Summer Olympics. In 1995 she set a national record in the same 200-metre breaststroke that stood for five years. At the ASA National British Championships she won the 100 metres breaststroke title in 1994, the 200 metres breaststroke title in 1993, 1994 and 1995 and the 400 metres medley title in 1994.

She represented England and won a silver medal in the medley relay event, at the 1994 Commonwealth Games in Victoria, British Columbia, Canada.

== See also ==
- List of Commonwealth Games medallists in swimming (women)
