= The Drawbridge =

Quarterly independent newspaper

- Editor: Bigna Pfenninger
- Art Director: Stephen Coates
- Drawings Editor: Paul Davis
- Picture Editor: Millie Simpson
- Commissioning Editor: Mark Reynolds
- Categories: Newspaper
- Frequency: Quarterly
- Publisher: Drawbridge Publishing Ltd
- Total circulation: 5,000 (estimated)
- Founded: 2006
- First issue: 1 April 2006
- Country: United Kingdom
- Language: English
- Website: www.thedrawbridge.org.uk

The Drawbridge is a quarterly newspaper started in London in 2006. It is a full-colour independent paper that has published articles by Isabel Allende, J. G. Ballard, John Berger, Terry Eagleton, Umberto Eco, John N. Gray, Eric Hobsbawm, Siri Hustvedt, Etgar Keret, Simon McBurney, Alberto Manguel, DBC Pierre, Tracy Quan, Jonathan Raban, José Saramago, Roberto Saviano, Dubravka Ugrešić, Mario Vargas Llosa, Irvine Welsh, Edmund White and Tobias Wolff alongside photography and drawings by Adam Broomberg & Oliver Chanarin, Brian Cronin, Paul Davis, Jeff Fisher, Paul Fryer, Paul Graham, Jaki Jo, David Moore, Martin Parr, Robert Polidori, David Shrigley, Joel Sternfeld, Emer O'Brien, and Peter Till.

Each issue presents contributions around a selected theme. The Autumn 2010 issue includes writing by Héctor Abad Faciolince, Bidisha, Max Frisch, Vasily Grossman, Yōko Ogawa, José Saramago, Antonio Tabucchi, Colm Tóibín and Evie Wyld, and art and photography by Maurizio Anzeri, Jessica Backhaus, Elizabeth Heyert, Eadweard Muybridge, Jason Orton, David Shrigley and Joel Sternfeld.

The Drawbridge has been reviewed by The Guardian, BBC Radio 3′s Night Waves, Design Week, magculture.com and The Independent.
