= Nicholas Shackell =

British swimmer (born 1974)

Nick Shackell
Personal information
- Nationality: English
- Born: 31 October 1974 (age 51) Marlow, Buckinghamshire

Sport
- Sport: Swimming
- Club: Millfield School
Medal record
Swimming
Representing England
Commonwealth Games
Bronze medal – third place	1994 Victoria	4x100m relay
Bronze medal – third place	1994 Victoria	4x200m relay
Bronze medal – third place	1994 Victoria	medley relay
Silver medal – second place	1998 Kuala Lumpur	medley relay
Bronze medal – third place	1998 Kuala Lumpur	4x100m relay

Nicholas Shackell (also Nick) (born 31 October 1974) is a former freestyle swimmer from Great Britain.

== Early life ==
He grew up in Pyrford in Surrey. He studied sport at Alabama State University.

== Swimming career ==
Nicholas competed in the 100 metre freestyle at the 1996 Atlanta Olympics, finishing 28th fastest overall. He finished 8th as a member of the relay squad in the final of the 4×100 metre freestyle relay, but the 4×100 metre medley relay team was disqualified in the preliminaries.

He represented England winning three bronze medals in the relay events, at the 1994 Commonwealth Games in Victoria, British Columbia, Canada. Four years later he represented England again and won a silver and bronze in the relay events, at the 1998 Commonwealth Games in Kuala Lumpur.

He won the 1994 British Championship in 100 metres freestyle.

== Personal life ==
Shackell has three children who are also swimmers, Aaron, Andrew, and Alex. Aaron and Alex represented the United States at the 2024 Summer Olympics in Paris.

== See also ==
- List of Commonwealth Games medallists in swimming (men)
