= Fraser Walker =

Scottish swimmer

Personal information
- Born: 1991 (age 34–35)
Medal record
Men's swimming
Representing Scotland
Commonwealth Games
Bronze medal – third place	1994 Victoria	200 m individual medley
Representing Great Britain
World Championships (SC)
Silver medal – second place	1993 Palma	200 m individual medley
Summer Universiade
Gold medal – first place	1993 Buffalo	200 m individual medley

Fraser Walker (born 1973) is a retired male Scottish swimmer specialising in the individual medley events.

== Swimming career ==
Walker is best known for winning the silver medal in the Men's 200 m Individual Medley at the inaugural 1993 FINA Short Course World Championships in Palma de Mallorca, Spain, behind Germany's Christian Keller. He won a gold medal at the 1993 World Student Games in Buffalo, New York, USA and represented Scotland at the 1994 Commonwealth Games where he won the bronze medal in the 200 Metres Individual Medley.

In 1993, he became the first ever British swimmer to break the two-minute barrier for the 200 m individual medley with a time of 1 minute 58.35 at the World Championships in Palma De Mallorca. This stood as the British record for four and a half years and the Scottish record for 14 years. He swam for Warrender Baths Club in Edinburgh.

At the ASA National British Championships, he won the 200 metres medley title in 1993 and 1995.

== See also ==
- List of Commonwealth Games medallists in swimming (men)
