= Jessica Amey =

Canadian swimmer (born 1976)

Personal information
- Full name: Jessica L. Amey
- National team: Canada
- Born: November 15, 1976 (age 49) Montreal, Quebec
- Height: 1.73 m (5 ft 8 in)
- Weight: 63 kg (139 lb)

Sport
- Sport: Swimming
- Strokes: Butterfly, freestyle
- College team: University of Calgary; Stanford University
Medal record
Women's swimming
Representing Canada
World Championships (SC)
Silver medal – second place	1995 Rio	4×100 m medley
Pan Pacific Championships
Bronze medal – third place	1993 Kobe	50 m freestyle
Bronze medal – third place	1995 Atlanta	100 m butterfly
Commonwealth Games
Bronze medal – third place	1994 Victoria	4x100 m freestyle
Bronze medal – third place	1994 Victoria	4x100 m medley

Jessica L. Amey (born November 15, 1976) is a former competitive butterfly swimmer from Canada, who competed for her native country at the 1996 Summer Olympics in Atlanta, Georgia. There she finished in 25th position in the 100-metre butterfly, after having won the silver medal in the 4×100-metre medley relay one year earlier at the 1995 FINA Short Course World Championships, alongside Julie Howard, Lisa Flood and Shannon Shakespeare.

After her career on the Canadian national team, Amey attended Stanford University, where she swam for the Stanford Cardinal swimming and diving team in NCAA and Pacific-10 Conference competition. After completing her undergraduate degree at Stanford, she graduated from the University of Toronto Faculty of Law. She was a lawyer at McCarthy Tetrault LLP in Toronto, Ontario and currently works as a Planning Law solicitor for the City of Toronto.
