= Aaron Shackell =

American swimmer (born 2004)

Personal information
- Born: September 8, 2004 (age 22) Mission Viejo, California , US
- Height: 6 ft 5 in (196 cm)
- Weight: 200 lb (91 kg)
- Relatives: Nicholas Shackell, Olympian, father Alex Shackell, '24 Olympian, sister

Sport
- Country: United States
- Sport: Men's swimming
- Event: 200, 400 freestyle
- Strokes: Freestyle
- Club: Carmel Swim Club; Carmel, Indiana
- College team: University of California; University of Texas
- Coach: Chris Plumb (Carmel Swim Club); Anthony Nesty ('24 Olympics)
Medal record
Men's swimming
Representing the United States
Pan Pacific Championships
Gold medal – first place	2026 Irvine	4×200 m freestyle
Bronze medal – third place	2026 Irvine	400 m freestyle

Aaron Shackell (/ˈʃækəl/ SHAK-əl; born September 8, 2004) is an American swimmer who trained and competed with the Carmel Swim Club in Carmel, Indiana and was a 2024 Paris Olympics team member for the United States. Shackell qualified for the U.S. team at the 2024 US Olympic Swimming Team Trials where he placed first in the 400m freestyle with a time of 3:45.46, later placing eighth in the finals of the event at the 2024 Paris Olympics with a time of 3:47.00.

== Early life ==
Shackell was born September 8, 2004 in Mission Viejo, California. From a strong family of swimmers, Aaron's father, Nicholas, was also an Olympic swimmer who competed for Auburn University, and represented Great Britain at the 1996 Atlanta Olympics in the 100m freestyle. His sister Alex also qualified for the 2024 US Olympic team with Aaron, after placing second in 200m butterfly and sixth in 200m freestyle at the U.S. trials. Aaron's brother Andrew, also competed at the 2024 swimming trails in Indianapolis, though he did not qualify for the U.S. team.

=== High school swimming ===
After a family move, Aaron grew up in Carmel, Indiana, where he attended Carmel High School, and swam for their strong swimming program. At Carmel High, he was coached through much of his career by swim coach Chris Plumb. He trained and competed with the equally strong Carmel Swim Club under accomplished Head Coach Chris Plumb, his High School coach, and a former All American swimmer for Indiana University. Plumb began coaching the Carmel Club in 2006 and also coached Carmel High School. During his later career with the Carmel Swim Club, Shackell won Junior National Championships sponsored by Speedo three times. Representing Carmel High School, in 2022, Shackell won Indiana High School State Championships in the 100 butterfly with a 47.69, the 200 medley relay with a combined time of 1:26.88, and the 4x100 freestyle relay with a combined time of 2:58.11. Shackell would win state championships in individual events in other years. Swimming for Carmel High at the February 25-26, 2023 Indiana High School State Championships, Shackell won four final events, with a 1:33.68 in the 200 freestyle. He was also part of a winning 200-yard medley relay event for Carmel High, won the individual 500-freestyle for Carmel with a time of 4:15.38, and served as the fourth position anchor swimmer for Carmel High in the 4x100 freestyle relay team that had a combined time of 2:59.52. Shackell helped lead Carmel High to their successive ninth Indiana State Team championship in 2023.

=== Collegiate career ===
Shackell completed the 2023 Fall semester at the University of California, and then returned to Carmel to train with the Carmel Swim Club. In the Fall of 2024, Shackell swam for the University of Texas, then returned to Carmel to continue his training.

== 2024 Paris Olympics ==
Before an audience of over 250,000, at the mid-June, 2024 Olympic trials in Indianapolis, Indiana, Shackell won the 400 meter freestyle finals with a time of 3:45.46, qualifying him for the U.S. Olympic team. Skilled in multiple events, Shackell also competed in the 200 freestyle, 100 butterfly and 200 butterfly, at the 2024 Olympic trials, but did not qualify in these events.

Shackell later represented the United States at the late July, 2024 Paris Olympics, where he competed in the 400-meter freestyle, and was managed by Head U.S. Olympic Men's swim coach Anthony Nesty. Nesty, an International Swimming Hall of Fame inductee, was an Olympic medalist who swam for the University of Florida, and been a successful coach there. Shackell made the finals in the 400-meter event where he placed eighth with a time of 3:47.00, less than five seconds from contending for a medal. His preliminary time in Heat 4 on July 27, 2024 of 3:45.45 qualified him to advance to the final round. In a very close finish in the finals of the highly competitive event, Lukas Martens of Germany took the gold medal with a time of 3:41.78, Elijah Winnington of Australia took the Silver with a time of 3:42.21, and Kim U-Min of Korea took the bronze with a time of 3:42.50.
