= Stephanie Richardson =

Canadian swimmer

Personal information
- Born: 11 February 1977 (age 49) Toronto, Ontario, Canada

Sport
- Sport: Swimming
Medal record
Representing Canada
Commonwealth Games
| Bronze medal – third place | 1994 Victoria | 4x200m freestyle relay |

Stephanie Richardson (born 11 February 1977) is a Canadian swimmer. She competed in the women's 800 metre freestyle event at the 1996 Summer Olympics.
