= Claire Huddart =

British swimmer (born 1971)

Personal information
- Full name: Claire Marie Huddart
- National team: Great Britain
- Born: 22 December 1971 (age 54) Manchester, England
- Height: 1.70 m (5 ft 7 in)
- Weight: 64 kg (141 lb; 10.1 st)

Sport
- Sport: Swimming
- Strokes: Freestyle
Medal record
Women's swimming
Representing Great Britain
World Championships (SC)
Gold medal – first place	1999 Hong Kong	4×100 m freestyle
Gold medal – first place	2000 Athens	4×200 m freestyle
Silver medal – second place	1999 Hong Kong	4×200 m freestyle
Bronze medal – third place	2000 Athens	4×100 m freestyle
Representing England
Commonwealth Games
Gold medal – first place	1994 Victoria	4×100 m freestyle
Silver medal – second place	1994 Victoria	4×200 m freestyle
Silver medal – second place	1998 Kuala Lumpur	4×100 m freestyle
Silver medal – second place	1998 Kuala Lumpur	4×200 m freestyle

Claire Marie Huddart (born 22 December 1971) is an English former freestyle swimmer.

== Swimming career ==
Huddart represented Great Britain at two consecutive Summer Olympics, starting in 1996. She won the 1998 ASA National Championship 200 metres freestyle title.

She represented England and won a gold medal in the 4 × 100 m freestyle relay event and a silver medal in the 4 × 200 m freestyle relay event, at the 1994 Commonwealth Games in Victoria, British Columbia, Canada. Four years later she represented England again and won two silver medals in the relay events, at the 1998 Commonwealth Games in Kuala Lumpur, Malaysia.

== See also ==
- World record progression 4 × 200 metres freestyle relay
