= Jon Olsen =

American swimmer (born 1969)

Personal information
- Full name: Jon C. Olsen
- National team: United States
- Born: April 25, 1969 (age 57) New Britain, Connecticut, U.S.
- Height: 6 ft 5 in (1.96 m)
- Weight: 181 lb (82 kg)

Sport
- Sport: Swimming
- Strokes: Freestyle
- Club: Curl-Burke Swim Club
- College team: University of Alabama
Medal record
Men's swimming
Representing United States
Olympic Games
| Gold medal – first place | 1992 Barcelona | 4×100 m freestyle |
| Gold medal – first place | 1992 Barcelona | 4×100 m medley |
| Gold medal – first place | 1996 Atlanta | 4×100 m freestyle |
| Gold medal – first place | 1996 Atlanta | 4×200 m freestyle |
| Bronze medal – third place | 1992 Barcelona | 4×200 m freestyle |
World Championships (LC)
| Gold medal – first place | 1994 Rome | 4×100 m freestyle |
| Gold medal – first place | 1998 Perth | 4×100 m freestyle |
World Championships (SC)
| Gold medal – first place | 1993 Palma | 4×100 m medley |
| Silver medal – second place | 1993 Palma | 4×100 m freestyle |
| Bronze medal – third place | 1993 Palma | 100 m freestyle |
Pan Pacific Championships
| Gold medal – first place | 1989 Tokyo | 4×100 m freestyle |
| Gold medal – first place | 1989 Tokyo | 4×200 m freestyle |
| Gold medal – first place | 1991 Edmonton | 4×100 m freestyle |
| Gold medal – first place | 1991 Edmonton | 4×200 m freestyle |
| Gold medal – first place | 1993 Kobe | 50 m freestyle |
| Gold medal – first place | 1993 Kobe | 100 m freestyle |
| Gold medal – first place | 1993 Kobe | 4×100 m freestyle |
| Gold medal – first place | 1993 Kobe | 4×100 m medley |
| Gold medal – first place | 1995 Atlanta | 4×100 m freestyle |
| Gold medal – first place | 1997 Fukuoka | 4×100 m freestyle |
| Silver medal – second place | 1989 Tokyo | 200 m freestyle |
| Silver medal – second place | 1995 Atlanta | 100 m freestyle |
| Silver medal – second place | 1995 Atlanta | 4×200 m freestyle |
Pan American Games
| Gold medal – first place | 1995 Mar del Plata | 4×100 m freestyle |
| Gold medal – first place | 1995 Mar del Plata | 4×200 m freestyle |
| Gold medal – first place | 1995 Mar del Plata | 4×100 m medley |
| Silver medal – second place | 1995 Mar del Plata | 100 m freestyle |

Jon C. Olsen (born April 25, 1969) is an American former competition swimmer, four-time Olympic champion, and former world record-holder. Olsen was a successful relay swimmer for the U.S. national team in the late 1980s and 1990s. He has won a total of 27 medals in major international competition, 20 gold, 5 silver, and 2 bronze spanning the Olympics, the World, Pan Pacific, and the Pan American championships.

== Swimming career ==
Olsen represented the United States at two consecutive Olympic Games, and won a total number of five Olympic medals, including four golds. At the 1992 Summer Olympics in Barcelona, Spain, he won his first gold medal as a member of the winning U.S. team in the men's 4×100-meter freestyle relay, together with teammates Joe Hudepohl, Matt Biondi and Tom Jager. He won a second gold medal for swimming the freestyle anchor leg for the first-place U.S. team in the men's 4×100-meter medley relay. With his medley relay teammates Jeff Rouse (backstroke), Nelson Diebel (breaststroke), and Pablo Morales (butterfly), he tied the world record in the event of 3:36.93. He also received a bronze medal as a member of the third-place U.S. team in the men's 4×200-meter freestyle relay. Individually, he also placed fourth in the final of the men's 100-meter freestyle with a time of 49.51 seconds.

Four years later at the 1996 Summer Olympics in Atlanta, Georgia, Olsen again won a gold medal as a member of the first-place U.S. team in the men's 4×100-meter freestyle relay with fellow team members Josh Davis, Brad Schumacher and Gary Hall, Jr., and set a new Olympic record of 3:15.41. He received another gold for swimming for the winning U.S. team in the preliminary heats of the men's 4×200-meter freestyle relay. He also competed in the individual men's 100-meter freestyle and placed ninth overall in the B Final of the event with a time of 49.80 seconds. Olsen was elected captain of the U.S. Olympic swim team at the 1996 Games by his teammates.

During his career, Olsen was trained by former freestyle sprinter Jonty Skinner. He was also coached by the current Laurel Swim Association head coach, Warren Holladay, who was previously an assistant coach at the University of Alabama. Olsen attended the University of Alabama, where he swam for Alabama Crimson Tide swimming and diving team. He currently resides in the Florida Keys with his family where he coaches swimming. He has two daughters and a son.

== See also ==
- List of multiple Olympic gold medalists
- List of Olympic medalists in swimming (men)
- List of University of Alabama people
- List of World Aquatics Championships medalists in swimming (men)
- World record progression 4 × 100 metres freestyle relay
- World record progression 4 × 100 metres medley relay
