= Jonathan Cleveland =

Canadian swimmer (born 1970)

Personal information
- Full name: Jonathan Thomas Cleveland
- Nickname: "Jon"
- National team: Canada
- Born: December 19, 1970 (age 55) Fresno, California
- Height: 1.78 m (5 ft 10 in)
- Weight: 73 kg (161 lb)

Sport
- Sport: Swimming
- Strokes: Breaststroke
- Club: Team Corel
- College team: University of Calgary
Medal record
Men's swimming
Representing Canada
Olympic Games
Bronze medal – third place	1992 Barcelona	4x100 m medley
Pan Pacific Championships
Silver medal – second place	1991 Edmonton	4x100 m medley
Silver medal – second place	1993 Kobe	200 m breaststroke
Bronze medal – third place	1989 Tokyo	200 m breaststroke
Commonwealth Games
Gold medal – first place	1990 Auckland	200 m breaststroke
Gold medal – first place	1990 Auckland	4x100 m medley
Silver medal – second place	1994 Victoria	4x100 m medley
Bronze medal – third place	1994 Victoria	100 m breaststroke
Bronze medal – third place	1994 Victoria	200 m breaststroke
Pan American Games
Silver medal – second place	1995 Mar del Plata	100 m breaststroke
Bronze medal – third place	1995 Mar del Plata	4x100 m medley

Jonathan Thomas Cleveland (born December 19, 1970) is a former competition swimmer and breaststroke specialist who was born in the United States and competed for Canada at three Summer Olympics, starting in 1988.

Four years later he won the bronze medal with the Canadian team in the men's 4x100-metre medley relay, together with Mark Tewksbury, Marcel Gery and Stephen Clarke. His best individual performance was seventh place, at the 1988 Summer Olympics in Seoul, in the 200-metre breaststroke.

Cleveland won gold medals in the men's 200-metre breaststroke and 4x100-metre medley relay at the 1990 Commonwealth Games. He became the head swim coach at Newman Smith High School, and later at Ranchview High School, located in Texas.

Cleveland is the son of former Major League Baseball pitcher Reggie Cleveland.

Cleveland now resides in Texas with his wife and three children.

== See also ==
- List of Commonwealth Games medallists in swimming (men)
- List of Olympic medalists in swimming (men)
