= Rebecca Brown (swimmer) =

Australian swimmer

Personal information
- Full name: Rebecca Kate Brown
- Nationality: Australia
- Born: 8 May 1977 (age 49) Brisbane, Australia
- Height: 1.77 m (5 ft 10 in)
- Weight: 62 kg (137 lb)

Sport
- Sport: Swimming
- Strokes: Breaststroke
Medal record
Women's swimming
Representing Australia
World Championships (SC)
Gold medal – first place	2000 Athens	200 m breaststroke
Pan Pacific Championships
Silver medal – second place	1993 Kobe	200 m breaststroke
Commonwealth Games
Silver medal – second place	1994 Victoria	100 m breaststroke
Silver medal – second place	1994 Victoria	200 m breaststroke

Rebecca Kate Brown (born 8 May 1977 in Brisbane, Queensland) is a former Australian breaststroke swimmer.

Brown gained national exposure in March 1994 when, at 16 years of age, she broke Anita Nall's 200-metre breaststroke world record by 0.59 seconds in Brisbane. In the aftermath of that swim, she was feted as Australia's newest teen swimming sensation.

However, at the 1994 Commonwealth Games in Victoria, Canada she lost out to Samantha Riley in both the 100 and 200-metre breaststroke events.

Failing to qualify for the 1996 Summer Olympics in Atlanta, Georgia and the 1998 Commonwealth Games in Kuala Lumpur, Malaysia, Brown announced her retirement from competitive swimming.

However, the chance to swim at a home Olympic Games was too good an opportunity pass up. So, Brown made a pact with her then fiancé, now husband, medley swimmer Zane King that they would put everything into making the team for Sydney. For Brown this meant moving to Melbourne to link up with her former coach, Michael Piper leaving the Australian Institute of Sport-based King behind.

She was in good form leading up to the Olympics trails taking the gold in the 200-metre breaststroke at the 2000 FINA Short Course World Championships as well as 4th in the 100-metre breaststroke and 5th in the 50-metre breaststroke.

In May 2000, she secured her place in the Olympic squad with a 2:28.98-minute second place in the 200-metre breaststroke trail final. At the Olympics itself she failed to make to the final, finishing 7th in her semi-final and 14th overall in a time of 2:29.90 mins.

At the conclusion of the Games, she announced her retirement and in November 2005 she gave birth to her first child, Indiana Rose King.

== See also ==
- World record progression 200 metres breaststroke
