= Guy Callaghan =

New Zealand swimmer

Personal information
- Full name: Guy James Callaghan
- Nationality: New Zealand
- Born: 7 September 1970 (age 55) Hastings, Hawke's Bay
- Height: 1.78 m (5 ft 10 in)
- Weight: 72 kg (159 lb)

Sport
- Sport: Swimming
- Strokes: Butterfly
Medal record
Men's swimming
Representing New Zealand
World Championships (SC)
Gold medal – first place	1995 Rio	4x100m medley
Pan Pacific Championships
Bronze medal – third place	1995 Atlanta	4×200 m free
Commonwealth Games
Silver medal – second place	1994 Victoria	4x200m free

Guy Callaghan (born 7 September 1970 in Hastings, Hawke's Bay) is a former butterfly swimmer from New Zealand, who competed at the 1992 Summer Olympics in Barcelona, Spain for his native country.

His biggest success came in 1995, at the second edition of the FINA World SC Championships in Rio de Janeiro, Brazil, where Callaghan won the gold medal with the Men's 4x100 Medley Relay Team. This was a New Zealand record time and was the 4th fastest time ever recorded.

== See also ==
- List of Commonwealth Games medallists in swimming (men)
