= Michael Mason (swimmer) =

Canadian swimmer

Personal information
- Full name: Michael T. Mason
- National team: Canada
- Born: March 18, 1974 (age 52) Delaware, Ohio
- Height: 1.85 m (6 ft 1 in)
- Weight: 81 kg (179 lb)

Sport
- Sport: Swimming
- Strokes: Breaststroke
- Club: Etobicoke Swim Club

Michael T. Mason (born March 18, 1974) is a former competition breaststroke swimmer, who was born in the United States, but represented Canada in international competition. He competed for Canada at the 1992 Summer Olympics in Barcelona, Spain, and finished in 23rd position in the men's 200-metre breaststroke.
