= Stacey Gartrell =

Australian swimmer (born 1977)

Personal information
- Full name: Stacey Gartrell
- National team: Australia
- Born: 6 January 1977 (age 49) Sydney, New South Wales
- Height: 1.71 m (5 ft 7 in)
- Weight: 60 kg (132 lb)

Sport
- Sport: Swimming
- Strokes: Freestyle
Medal record
Women's swimming
Representing Australia
Pan Pacific Championships
Silver medal – second place	1993 Kobe	1500m freestyle
Silver medal – second place	1993 Kobe	4x200m freestyle
Bronze medal – third place	1995 Atlanta	1500m freestyle
Commonwealth Games
Gold medal – first place	1994 Victoria	800 m freestyle
Silver medal – second place	1994 Victoria	400 m freestyle

Stacey Gartrell (born 6 January 1977) is a former freestyle long-distance swimmer from Australia, who competed at the 1996 Summer Olympics for her native country. She finished in eleventh position in the Women's 800m Freestyle, clocking 8:42.39 in the qualifying heats.
