= Julie Howard =

Canadian swimmer

Personal information
- Full name: Julie Kathryn Howard
- National team: Canada
- Born: October 23, 1976 (age 49) Brantford, Ontario
- Height: 1.73 m (5 ft 8 in)
- Weight: 63 kg (139 lb)

Sport
- Sport: Swimming
- Strokes: Backstroke, freestyle
- Club: Brantford Aquatic Club
Medal record
Women's swimming
Representing Canada
World Championships (SC)
Silver medal – second place	1995 Rio de Janeiro	4×100 m medley

Julie Kathryn Howard (born October 23, 1976), later known by her married name Julie Johnson, is a former international butterfly and backstroke swimmer from Canada, who competed at two consecutive Summer Olympics.

At the 1992 Summer Olympics in Barcelona, Spain, she was eliminated in the qualifying heats of the 100-metre butterfly and 100-metre backstroke. Four years later at the 1996 Summer Olympics in Atlanta, United States, Howard's best finish was the fifth place with the Canadian relay team in the 4×100-metre medley, alongside Sarah Evanetz, Guylaine Cloutier and Shannon Shakespeare. In 1995 she won the silver medal in the 4×100-metre medley relay at the 1995 FINA Short Course World Championships, teaming up with Jessica Amey, Lisa Flood and Shannon Shakespeare.

She now teaches STRIDE and AIG in W.H. Robinson elementary school, and Science (specializing in Biology) at Markham District High School.
