= Chris Fydler =

Australian swimmer

Personal information
- Full name: Christopher John Fydler
- Nickname: "Fydes"
- National team: Australia
- Born: 8 November 1972 (age 53) Sydney, New South Wales
- Height: 1.97 m (6 ft 6 in)
- Weight: 95 kg (209 lb)

Sport
- Sport: Swimming
- Strokes: Freestyle
Medal record
Men's swimming
Representing Australia
Olympic Games
Gold medal – first place	2000 Sydney	4×100 m freestyle
World Championships (LC)
Gold medal – first place	1998 Perth	4×100 m medley
Silver medal – second place	1998 Perth	4×100 m freestyle
World Championships (SC)
Gold medal – first place	1999 Hong Kong	4×100 m freestyle
Gold medal – first place	1999 Hong Kong	4×100 m medley
Pan Pacific Championships
Gold medal – first place	1999 Sydney	4×100 m freestyle
Silver medal – second place	1991 Edmonton	100 m freestyle
Silver medal – second place	1991 Edmonton	4×100 m freestyle
Silver medal – second place	1993 Kobe	100 m freestyle
Silver medal – second place	1993 Kobe	4×100 m freestyle
Silver medal – second place	1993 Kobe	4×100 m medley
Silver medal – second place	1995 Atlanta	4×100 m freestyle
Silver medal – second place	1995 Atlanta	4×100 m medley
Silver medal – second place	1997 Fukuoka	4×100 m freestyle
Silver medal – second place	1997 Fukuoka	4×100 m medley
Bronze medal – third place	1991 Edmonton	4×100 m medley
Bronze medal – third place	1995 Atlanta	50 m freestyle
Bronze medal – third place	1995 Atlanta	100 m freestyle
Bronze medal – third place	1999 Sydney	100 m freestyle
Commonwealth Games
Gold medal – first place	1990 Auckland	4×100 m freestyle
Gold medal – first place	1994 Victoria	4×100 m freestyle
Gold medal – first place	1998 Kuala Lumpur	4×100 m freestyle
Gold medal – first place	1994 Victoria	4×100 m medley
Gold medal – first place	1998 Kuala Lumpur	4×100 m medley
Silver medal – second place	1990 Auckland	100 m freestyle
Silver medal – second place	1994 Victoria	100 m freestyle
Silver medal – second place	1998 Kuala Lumpur	100 m freestyle
Bronze medal – third place	1990 Auckland	4×100 m medley

Christopher John Fydler OAM (born 8 November 1972) is a former competitive swimmer from Australia, who competed in three consecutive Summer Olympics for his native country, starting in 1992. Fydler represented Australia at an international level from 1989 to 2000. During his career he amassed over 20 national championships including five consecutive national 100-metre freestyle championships. At the Sydney 2000 Olympics, he was a member of the men's 4×100-metre freestyle relay team that defeated the Americans and won the gold medal with Michael Klim, Ian Thorpe and Ashley Callus. It was the first time in Olympic history that the US team had been beaten in that event.

Fydler competed in the Gladiator Individual Sports Athletes Challenge in 1995.

Since retiring from swimming in early 2001, Fydler has continued to be active in the swimming and Olympic families. He was a board member of Swimming Australia Ltd from 2006 to 2010, was a member of the FINA Disciplinary Panel in 2009-2017 and a member of its Ethics Panel 2018-2023, and is currently the President of Swimming NSW. He was also the Deputy Chef de Mission for the Australian Olympic Team competing in 2012 London Olympics and again at the 2016 Rio Olympics. Fydler was also a been a board member of the NSW Institute of Sport from 2017-2023.

For his significant contribution to Swimming in Australia over the last 30 years, Fydler was awarded Life Membership of Swimming Australia in 2020.

Fydler graduated from Bond University in 1997 with a BComm and Llb (Hons). He was admitted as a solicitor in New South Wales in January 1998. He practiced as a lawyer in Sydney from 1998 to 2003 before taking equity in a Sydney-based System Integration business Oriel Technologies. After Oriel Technologies was sold in 2016 to the Big Air Group (ASX:BGL), Fydler had a short break before being appointed as CEO and then Managing Director of Tambla Ltd (formerly ComOps Ltd), a publicly listed Workforce Management software company.

After 5 years on its Board, Fydler was appointed Chair of Pymble Ladies College in 2024.

In May 2025, Fydler was appointed president of Swimming Australia.

== See also ==
- List of Commonwealth Games medallists in swimming (men)
- List of Olympic medalists in swimming (men)
- World record progression 4 × 100 metres freestyle relay
