= Lisa Flood =

Canadian swimmer (born 1971)

Personal information
- Full name: Lisa Anne Flood
- National team: Canada
- Born: August 1, 1971 (age 54) Scarborough, Ontario
- Height: 1.83 m (6 ft 0 in)
- Weight: 76 kg (168 lb)

Sport
- Sport: Swimming
- Strokes: Breaststroke
- Club: Pacific Dolphins
- College team: Villanova University
Medal record
Women's swimming
Representing Canada
World Championships (SC)
Silver medal – second place	1995 Rio de Janeiro	4x100 m medley
Pan American Games
Gold medal – first place	1995 Mar del Plata	100 m breaststroke
Gold medal – first place	1995 Mar del Plata	200 m breaststroke
Silver medal – second place	1995 Mar del Plata	4x100 m medley
Bronze medal – third place	1991 Havana	100 m breaststroke
Bronze medal – third place	1991 Havana	200 m breaststroke

Lisa Anne Flood (born August 1, 1971) is a Canadian former competitive swimmer and breaststroke specialist. Flood competed at two consecutive Summer Olympics, starting at the 1992 Summer Olympics in Barcelona, Spain. There she finished in fourteenth position in the women's 200-metre breaststroke. Four years later at the 1996 Summer Olympics in Atlanta, Georgia, Flood came in tenth place in the women's 100-metre breaststroke.

In other international competition, she won bronze medals in the 100- and 200-metre breaststroke at the 1991 Pan American Games in Havana, Cuba, and another pair of bronze medals in the 200-metre breaststroke and 4×100-metre medley relay at the 1994 Commonwealth Games in Victoria, British Columbia. At the 1995 FINA Short Course World Championships in Rio de Janeiro, Brazil, she won a silver medal as a member of the second-place Canadian team in the women's 4×100-metre medley relay, alongside Julie Howard, Jessica Amey and Shannon Shakespeare. She won three medals at the 1995 Pan American Games in Mar del Plata, Argentina, including two golds in her signature 100- and 200-metre breaststroke events, and a silver in the 4×100-metre medley relay with Joanne Malar, Shannon Shakespeare and Marianne Limpert.

Flood attended Villanova University in Philadelphia, Pennsylvania, where she swam for the Villanova Wildcats swimming and diving team in National Collegiate Athletic Association (NCAA) and Big East Conference competition from 1991 to 1994. She won an NCAA national championship in the women's 200-yard breaststroke in 1992, becoming the first Wildcats women's swimmer to win an NCAA title. During her college swimming career, she received eight All-American honors, was recognized as Big East Outstanding Female Swimmer in 1991 and 1992, and won 10 conference championships. Flood was honored by the NCAA with its Top 8 Award for athletic and academic accomplishments in 1995, and graduated from Villanova in 1995.
