= Steven Dewick =

Australian swimmer

Personal information
- Full name: Steven Dennis Dewick
- National team: Australia
- Born: 2 February 1976 (age 50) Sydney, New South Wales
- Height: 1.82 m (6 ft 0 in)
- Weight: 86 kg (190 lb)

Sport
- Sport: Swimming
- Strokes: Backstroke
- Coach: Gary Toner
Medal record
Men's swimming
Representing Australia
Olympic Games
Bronze medal – third place	1996 Atlanta	4×100 m medley
Pan Pacific Championships
Silver medal – second place	1995 Atlanta	4×100m medley
Commonwealth Games
Gold medal – first place	1994 Victoria	4×100 m medley
Silver medal – second place	1994 Victoria	100 m backstroke

Steven Dennis Dewick (born 2 February 1976) is an Australian backstroke swimmer who won a bronze medal in the 4×100-metre medley relay at the 1996 Summer Olympics in Atlanta.

Dewick made his senior international debut when he was selected for Australia to compete at the Oceania Championships in 1993. A star at the 1994 Commonwealth Games in Victoria, British Columbia, Canada, he collected a silver medal in the 100-metre backstroke, and a gold medal in the 4×100-metre medley relay. Steven was voted as the performance of the games for his 100-metre backstroke.

In Atlanta, Dewick combined with Phil Rogers, Scott Miller and Michael Klim to trail the United States and Russia teams into third place. Dewick also competed in the 100-metre backstroke, advancing to the semifinals. A great achievement considering Steven was swimming with a broken back from an accident at the Olympic village two days prior to the start of the 1996 games.

== See also ==
- List of Commonwealth Games medallists in swimming (men)
- List of Olympic medalists in swimming (men)
