= Scott Miller (swimmer) =

Australian swimmer

Personal information
- Full name: Scott Andrew Miller
- National team: Australia
- Born: 21 February 1975 (age 51) Manly, New South Wales, Australia
- Height: 1.93 m (6 ft 4 in)
- Weight: 93 kg (205 lb)

Sport
- Sport: Swimming
- Strokes: Butterfly
Medal record
Men's swimming
Representing Australia
Olympic Games
Silver medal – second place	1996 Atlanta	100 m butterfly
Bronze medal – third place	1996 Atlanta	4x100 m medley
World Championships (SC)
Gold medal – first place	1995 Rio	100 m butterfly
Silver medal – second place	1995 Rio	200 m butterfly
Silver medal – second place	1995 Rio	4×100 m medley
Pan Pacific Championships
Gold medal – first place	1995 Atlanta	100 m butterfly
Gold medal – first place	1995 Atlanta	200 m butterfly
Silver medal – second place	1993 Kobe	200 m butterfly
Silver medal – second place	1993 Kobe	4x100 m medley
Silver medal – second place	1995 Atlanta	4x100 m medley
Commonwealth Games
Gold medal – first place	1994 Victoria	100 m butterfly
Gold medal – first place	1994 Victoria	4x100 m medley
Silver medal – second place	1994 Victoria	200 m butterfly

Scott Andrew Miller (born 21 February 1975) is an Australian convicted drug dealer and former butterfly swimmer who competed at the 1996 Summer Olympics, winning a silver and bronze medal.

== Career ==
=== Early years ===
Coached by Barry Prime, the Manly-born swimmer emerged onto the international scene as a 19-year-old at the 1994 Commonwealth Games in Victoria, British Columbia, where he won the 100 m butterfly and the 4×100 m medley relay. In 1995, he became the World Short Course champion in the 200 m butterfly, and established himself as a contender for the 1996 Olympics. While competing at the Pan Pacific Championships in Atlanta that year, he was jailed for a night after intervening in a fight outside a nightclub. He was later cleared of wrongdoing.

=== 1996 Olympics ===
At the 1996 Summer Olympics in Atlanta, Miller was the fastest qualifier for the 100 m butterfly final, setting a new Olympic record of 52.89s in his heat, raising Australian hopes of a first gold at these Olympics. However, Denis Pankratov, representing Russia, who had reserved a rather controversial technique for the final, had other ideas. Pankratov employed the "submarine" technique of underwater swimming, which involved diving into the water and dolphin kicking underwater for as long as possible (as swimmers can swim underwater quicker than they can swim at the surface). At the time, it was illegal for breaststrokers and backstrokers to stay underwater for more than 25 m after the dive, but this did not apply to butterfly. Pankratov glided underwater for 35 m and surfaced well clear, reaching the 50 m mark with a lead of roughly 1 m. Despite Miller's determined run home, he touched in 52.53 s to claim the silver medal, 0.36 s behind Pankratov, who broke the nine-year-old world record in 52.27 s.

After the race, Australian head coach Don Talbot was full of praise for Miller's efforts – "I haven't seen a swimmer come back as hard as Miller did. I've got to hand it to him." Miller also claimed a second medal; he combined with Michael Klim, Steven Dewick and Phil Rogers to claim bronze in the 4×100 m medley relay.

=== Return to Australia ===
Miller had a difficult time upon his return to Australia. He was dismissed from the Australian Institute of Sport for repeatedly missing training sessions, and spent 1997 on the sidelines due to injury. Miller reappeared in the headlines in late 1997 when he tested positive to marijuana and was suspended by FINA for two months in 1998, despite his protestations. On his return from suspension, he had been surpassed by Klim and Geoff Huegill and was unable to gain selection for the Sydney Olympics in 2000. He later made another comeback after the Sydney Olympics, but did not make any further impressions. In 2004, a horse named Krayzelburg which Miller part-owned with other swimming identities won the Sydney Entertainment Centre Trophy.

== Personal life ==
He was briefly married to television personality, Charlotte Dawson, from 1999 to 2000.

== Drug dealer ==
Miller was charged on 16 April 2008 after police seized a commercial pill press, drugs and cash in a raid on a storage facility in Brookvale, New South Wales, on Sydney's northern beaches. They also found capsicum spray and steroids, a loaded revolver, tablets believed to be ecstasy, powder believed to be methamphetamine and $240,000 cash. Miller was charged with possessing a prescribed restricted substance and possessing an offensive weapon. He was released on bail to appear at Manly Local Court on 7 May 2008. Miller subsequently pleaded guilty and was sentenced to 100 hours of community work and a two-year good behaviour bond. On 18 June 2013, Miller was arrested a second time after a police search at a Mascot property allegedly uncovered methamphetamine and $17,000 in cash. He was given a one-year suspended gaol sentence. Miller was arrested on 16 February 2021 during a police sting after investigations into a $2 million methamphetamine haul that was allegedly concealed inside candles.

It was widely reported on 16 February 2021 that Miller was arrested at his waterfront home in Rozelle, NSW along with Wayne Allan Johnson, who was detained at a home in Balmain, NSW in relation to a criminal syndicate linked to the distribution of methylamphetamine. Police seized what is alleged to be the drug 'ICE' with an estimated street value of $3 million which was hidden in candles, about 1 kg of heroin with a street value of $250,000, more than $75,000 in cash, mobile phones, documents, encrypted electronic devices and smaller amounts of prohibited drugs. He was charged with two counts of supplying a commercial quantity of a prohibited drug, dealing with the proceeds of crime and directing a criminal group. In November 2022, Miller was sentenced to a jail term of five years and six months, with a non-parole period of three years.

== See also ==
- List of Commonwealth Games medallists in swimming (men)
- List of Olympic medalists in swimming (men)

== Bibliography ==
- Andrews, Malcolm (2000). Australia at the Olympic Games.

Awards
Preceded by Incumbent	Swimming World Pacific Rim; Swimmer of the Year; 1995	Succeeded by Danyon Loader
