= Steven Mellor (swimmer) =

British swimmer (born 1973)

Personal information
- Nickname: Steve
- Born: 11 March 1973 (age 53) Macclesfield, England

Sport
- Sport: Swimming
- Strokes: Freestyle
- College team: University of Florida
Medal record
Men's swimming
Representing England
Commonwealth Games
Bronze medal – third place	1994 Victoria	4 x 200m freestyle relay

Steven Mellor (born 11 March 1973) competed for Great Britain in the swimming events at the 1992 Olympic Games in Barcelona.

== Swimming career ==
At 19 years old, Mellor qualified for the final of the men's 4 x 200 freestyle relay, finishing in sixth place in a new British Record.

Mellor also went on to win a bronze medal when representing England at the 1994 Commonwealth Games in Victoria, Canada, in the 4 x 200 metres freestyle relay.

He won the 1994 British Championship in the 400 metres freestyle.

Mellor was a college swimmer for the Florida Gators swimming and diving team from 1994 to 1995.

== Personal life ==
After representing his country for over 15 years, Mellor retired from swimming in 2002 and now runs a successful sports travel business.
