= 1993 Pan Pacific Swimming Championships =

International swimming competition

- Host city: Kobe, Japan
- Date: August 12–15, 1993
- Nations: 16

The fifth edition of the Pan Pacific Swimming Championships, a long course (50 m) event involving countries in the Pacific region, was held on August 12–15, 1993 in Kobe, Japan.

== Competing nations ==
- Australia
- Canada
- Chinese Taipei
- Costa Rica
- Ecuador
- Guam
- Hong Kong
- Indonesia
- Japan
- Kazakhstan
- South Korea
- Macau
- New Zealand
- Philippines
- Singapore
- United States

== Results ==
=== Men's events ===
Event	Gold		Silver		Bronze	
50 m freestyle	Jon Olsen; USA	22.68	Joe Hudepohl; USA	22.95	Dean Kondziolka; Canada	23.16
100 m freestyle	Jon Olsen; USA	49.73	Christopher Fydler; Australia	50.02	John Steel; New Zealand	50.12
200 m freestyle	Josh Davis; USA	1:48.50	Trent Bray; New Zealand	1:49.69	Uğur Taner; USA	1:49.80
400 m freestyle	Kieren Perkins; Australia	3:49.43	Daniel Kowalski; Australia	3:52.18	Chad Carvin; USA	3:52.46
800 m freestyle	Kieren Perkins; Australia	7:50.51	Daniel Kowalski; Australia	7:56.95	Chad Carvin; USA	8:00.36
1500 m freestyle	Kieren Perkins; Australia	14:55.92	Daniel Kowalski; Australia	15:06.77	Carlton Bruner; USA	15:16.64
100 m backstroke	Jeff Rouse; USA	54.85	Brian Retterer; USA	55.59	Hajime Itoi; Japan	56.54
200 m backstroke	Royce Sharp; USA	1:59.21	Tripp Schwenk; USA	2:00.08	Hajime Itoi; Japan	2:00.68
100 m breaststroke	Phil Rogers; Australia	1:01.56	Akira Hayashi; Japan	1:01.82	Seth Van Neerden; USA	1:02.35
200 m breaststroke	Phil Rogers; Australia	2:13.50	Jon Cleveland; Canada	2:14.31	Eric Wunderlich; USA	2:15.47
100 m butterfly	Mark Henderson; USA	53.91	Seth Pepper; USA	54.27	Danyon Loader; New Zealand	54.35
200 m butterfly	Danyon Loader; New Zealand	1:58.30	Scott Miller; Australia	1:58.47	Mitsuharu Takane; Japan	2:00.77
200 m individual medley	Matthew Dunn; Australia	2:01.52	Greg Burgess; USA	2:01.54	Trip Zedlitz; USA	2:03.38
400 m individual medley	Matthew Dunn; Australia	4:19.05	Tom Dolan; USA	4:20.72	Matt Hooper; USA	4:21.98
4×100 m freestyle relay	USA; Joe Hudepohl (49.68); Seth Pepper (49.49); David Fox (49.57); Jon Olsen (48.76)	3:17.50	Australia; Chris Fydler (49.93); Darren Lange (50.26); Andrew Baildon (49.78); Matthew Dunn (50.56)	3:20.53	Canada; Sebastien Goulet (51.45); Dean Kondziolka (50.74); Stephen Clarke (49.98); Robert Braknis (49.84)	3:22.01
4×200 m freestyle relay	USA; Greg Burgess (1:51.54); Chris Eckerman (1:49.41); Uğur Taner (1:49.75); Josh Davis (1:47.96)	7:18.66	Australia; Kieren Perkins (1:50.81); Deane Pieters (1:50.96); Malcolm Allen (1:51.43); Matthew Dunn (1:51.91)	7:25.11	New Zealand; John Steel (1:52.83); Trent Bray (1:50.15); Craig Ford (1:53.48); Danyon Loader (1:49.82)	7:26.28
4×100 m medley relay	USA; Jeff Rouse (55.10); Seth Van Neerden (1:02.37); Mark Henderson (53.24); Jon Olsen (48.81)	3:39.52	Australia; Simon Beqir (57.34); Phil Rogers (1:01.30); Scott Miller (53.51); Chris Fydler (49.41)	3:41.56	Japan; Hajime Itoi (56.64); Akira Hayashi (1:00.71); Mitsuhara Takane (54.18); Hajime Oono (51.69)	3:43.22

Legend: WR: World record, CR: Championship record

=== Women's events ===
Event	Gold		Silver		Bronze	
50 m freestyle	Jenny Thompson; USA	25.60	Angel Martino; USA	25.78	Jessica Amey; Canada	26.06
100 m freestyle	Jenny Thompson; USA	55.25	Susie O'Neill; Australia	55.80	Angel Martino; USA	55.97
200 m freestyle	Claudia Poll; Costa Rica	1:58.85	Nicole Haislett; USA	1:58.95	Suzu Chiba; Japan	1:59.56
400 m freestyle	Janet Evans; USA	4:07.47	Claudia Poll; Costa Rica	4:09.61	Suzu Chiba; Japan	4:10.67
800 m freestyle	Janet Evans; USA	8:23.72	Hayley Lewis; Australia	8:26.66	Claudia Poll; Costa Rica	8:33.80
1500 m freestyle	Hayley Lewis; Australia	16:04.84	Stacey Gartrell; Australia	16:10.42	Alexis Larsen; USA	16:19.03
100 m backstroke	Lea Loveless; USA	1:01.35	Barbara Bedford; USA	1:01.54	Yoko Koikawa; Japan	1:03.21
200 m backstroke	Barbara Bedford; USA	2:10.97	Lea Loveless; USA	2:11.42	Leigh Habler; Australia	2:13.89
100 m breaststroke	Anita Nall; USA	1:09.11	Samantha Riley; Australia	1:09.18	Guylaine Cloutier; Canada	1:09.93
200 m breaststroke	Anita Nall; USA	2:28.40	Rebecca Brown; Australia	2:28.42	Kristine Quance; USA	2:28.75
100 m butterfly	Jenny Thompson; USA	59.33	Susie O'Neill; Australia	59.86	Petria Thomas; Australia	1:01.03
200 m butterfly	Rie Shito; Japan	2:10.36	Mika Haruna; Japan	2:11.64	Julie Majer; Australia	2:11.88
200 m individual medley	Allison Wagner; USA	2:12.54	Hitomi Maehara; Japan	2:14.60	Elli Overton; Australia	2:15.45
400 m individual medley	Kristine Quance; USA	4:39.25	Allison Wagner; USA	4:41.22	Hayley Lewis; Australia	4:44.13
4×100 m freestyle relay	USA; Melanie Valerio (56.58); Nicole Haislett (55.89); Angel Martino (55.24); Jenny Thompson (54.84)	3:42.56	Australia; Anna Windsor (57.52); Sarah Ryan (56.57); Sally-Anne Sullivan (56.24); Susie O'Neill (55.87)	3:46.20	Canada; Marianne Limpert (56.78); Shannon Shakespeare (56.59); Patricia Levesgue (57.32); Joanne Malar (56.86)	3:47.55
4×200 m freestyle relay	USA; Nicole Haislett (2:00.41); Janet Evans (2:02.37); Sarah Anderson (2:01.80); Jenny Thompson (2:01.70)	8:06.28	Australia; Susie O'Neill (2:01.27); Stacey Gartrell (2:03.01); Anna Windsor (2:02.90); Hayley Lewis (2:01.55)	8:08.73	Japan; Sachiko Miyaji (2:01.65); Yoko Koikawa (2:01.94); Tomoko Goza (2:02.92); Suzu Chiba (2:02.23)	8:08.74
4×100 m medley relay	USA; Lea Loveless (1:01.33); Anita Nall (1:09.63); Jenny Thompson (58.70); Angel Martino (55.24)	4:04.90	Australia; Nicole Stevenson (1:02.84); Samantha Riley (1:09.45); Petria Thomas (1:00.19); Susie O'Neill (55.62)	4:08.10	Japan; Yoko Koikawa (1:03.06); Kyoko Kasuya (1:10.50); Rie Shito (1:01.07); Suzu Chiba (55.45)	4:10.08

Legend: WR: World record, CR: Championship record

== Medal table ==
Rank	Nation	Gold	Silver	Bronze	Total
1	United States (USA)	23	11	11	45
2	Australia (AUS)	8	17	5	30
3	Japan (JPN)	1	3	9	13
4	New Zealand (NZL)	1	1	3	5
5	Costa Rica (CRC)	1	1	1	3
6	Canada (CAN)	0	1	5	6
Totals (6 entries)		34	34	34	102

== See also ==
- List of Pan Pacific Championships records in swimming
