= Diego Henao =

Venezuelan swimmer (born 1971)

Personal information
- Born: 17 August 1971 (age 54)

Sport
- Sport: Swimming

Diego Henao (born 17 August 1971) is a Venezuelan swimmer. He competed in two events at the 1996 Summer Olympics.
