= Alejandro Carrizo =

Venezuelan swimmer (born 1974)

Personal information
- Born: 12 May 1974 (age 52)

Sport
- Sport: Swimming

Alejandro Carrizo (born 12 May 1974) is a Venezuelan swimmer. He competed in the men's 4 × 100 metre freestyle relay event at the 1996 Summer Olympics.
