= Darrick Bollinger =

Guamanian swimmer (born 1978)

Personal information
- Born: 8 August 1978 (age 47)

Sport
- Sport: Swimming

Darrick Bollinger (born 8 August 1978) is a Guamanian freestyle swimmer. He competed in two events at the 1996 Summer Olympics.
