= Luis López Hartinger =

Peruvian swimmer (born 1975)

Personal information
- Full name: Luis López Hartinger
- National team: Peru
- Born: 27 December 1975 (age 50)
- Height: 1.78 m (5 ft 10 in)
- Weight: 76 kg (168 lb)

Sport
- Sport: Swimming
- Strokes: Freestyle

Luis López Hartinger (born December 27, 1975) is a Peruvian former swimmer, who specialized in sprint freestyle events. Lopez competed only in the men's 50 m freestyle at the 2000 Summer Olympics in Sydney. He achieved a FINA B-standard entry time of 23.76 from the Pan American Games in Winnipeg, Manitoba, Canada. He challenged seven other swimmers in heat four, including Kyrgyzstan's Sergey Ashihmin, Goodwill Games silver medalist for Russia, and Kazakhstan's two-time Olympian Sergey Borisenko. He shared a fourth seed with Singapore's Leslie Kwok in a matching time of 24.00. Lopez failed to advance into the semifinals, as he placed forty-seventh overall out of 80 swimmers in the prelims.
