= José Isaza =

Panamanian swimmer (born 1972)

Personal information
- Born: 1 June 1972 (age 54)

Sport
- Sport: Swimming

José Isaza (born 1 June 1972) is a Panamanian swimmer. He competed in three events at the 1996 Summer Olympics.
