= Paul Kent (swimmer) =

New Zealand swimmer (born 1972)

Personal information
- Full name: Paul Michael Kent
- Nationality: New Zealand
- Born: 29 March 1972 (age 54) Auckland

Sport
- Sport: Swimming
- Strokes: Breaststroke
Medal record
World Championships (SC)
Gold medal – first place	1995 Rio de Janeiro	4x100m Medley
Silver medal – second place	1995 Rio de Janeiro	100m Breaststroke

Paul Kent (born 29 March 1972 in Auckland) is a former breaststroke swimmer from New Zealand, who competed at the 1996 Summer Olympics in Atlanta, United States.
