= Paul Fryer =

British sculptor, installation artist and musician

- Born: 1963 (age 62–63); Leeds, England
- Other name: OUIJA (music)
- Education: Leeds College of Art (attended, did not complete)
- Occupations: Sculptor, installation artist, musician, designer
- Known for: Wax, glass and electrical sculpture combining religious and scientific imagery
- Notable work: Lucifer (Morning Star) (2008); Pietà (The Empire Never Ended) (2007); Don't Be So (2002, poetry)
- Website: paulfryer.net

Paul Fryer (born 1963) is a British sculptor, installation artist and musician. He is known for wax, glass and electrical works that set religious imagery against scientific and industrial processes. Before turning to visual art full-time in 2005, he worked in music and fashion, including five years as musical director for Fendi. His sculptures are held in the François Pinault Foundation and have been shown at venues including the Gucci Museo in Florence, the Venice Biennale collateral exhibition Glasstress, and Somerset House in London. Since recovering from throat cancer, he has also recorded music under the name OUIJA.

== Early life ==
Fryer was born in 1963 in Leeds. He attended Leeds College of Art in the 1980s alongside fellow student Damien Hirst but left without completing his studies, working instead as an electropop singer and DJ. In the early 1990s he co-founded the Leeds nightclubs Kit Kat Club and Vague, designing club ephemera and producing records for the city's dance scene.

== Career ==
Fryer moved to London in 1996, working as a graphic designer and technical consultant on books and print material for galleries, fashion houses and record labels. He served as musical director for Fendi for five years, selecting and producing music for the house's runway shows, and during this period also presented the multimedia piece Electronic Elvis. In 2002 he published his first book, the poetry collection Don't Be So (see Publications).

He gave up his design and music work to concentrate on sculpture in 2005, debuting with the solo show Carpe Noctum at Trolley Gallery, London. He has since worked repeatedly with the engineer and physicist Colin Dancer on the electrical and mechanical systems in his sculptures. In 2007 the pair presented Art and Science: A Star in a Jar as part of the Serpentine Gallery's Experiment Marathon, curated by Hans Ulrich Obrist and Olafur Eliasson. The same year Fryer contributed a Tesla-coil lightning sculpture to The Tempest, made with Mat Collishaw for the 52nd Venice Biennale, and completed Pietà (The Empire Never Ended), a hyperrealistic wax figure of Christ seated in an electric chair, later acquired for the François Pinault Foundation.

In October 2008, during Frieze week, Fryer suspended a wax figure of a fallen angel from high-voltage cables for Lucifer (Morning Star) at Holy Trinity Church, Marylebone, shown alongside Martyr, which memorialised an electrical lineman killed on the job. In 2010 Pietà was exhibited at the Cathedral of Gap in the French Pyrenees, where its depiction of Christ's execution by electric chair drew controversy in the local press. Two years later, Pietà and a second work, Ophelia (white), were presented as Lo Spirito Vola, a Pinault Collection exhibition at the Gucci Museo in Florence. His glass sculptures Nebula and Hydromorphs (1–9) were shown in Glasstress: White Light, White Heat, a collateral event of the 55th Venice Biennale, in 2013.

Works from the Pinault Collection have continued to tour since: Ophelia (white) was included in Art Lovers at the Grimaldi Forum, Monaco, in 2014, and Pietà featured in So British! 10 Masterpieces from the Pinault Collection at the Musée des Beaux-Arts de Rouen in 2019–20. In 2016 Fryer was one of more than seventy artists in Daydreaming with Stanley Kubrick at Somerset House, London. Don't Be So is held in the collection of the Walker Art Center, Minneapolis.

Fryer has described his outlook as Gnostic, saying his work treats "knowledge of self" as central, and has spoken of using "technology as theology" to connect scientific process with older religious imagery.

== Publications ==
- Don't Be So (2002). Poetry, illustrated by Damien Hirst, with a foreword by Harland Miller. London: Trolley Books. ISBN 978-0-9542079-1-5.
- Radiations (2008). Monograph, with an introduction by Duncan Ward, an essay by Amanda Harlech, and a conversation between Fryer, Hans Ulrich Obrist and Colin Dancer. London: Other Criteria. 96 pp. ISBN 978-1-904212-19-5.
- Meaningless Static. Poetry and photography, with Damien Hirst. London: Westzone Publishing. ISBN 0-9537438-8-8.

== Music ==
Fryer worked as a musician before he became known as a sculptor, including five years as musical director for Fendi and the multimedia performance Electronic Elvis.

After recovering from throat cancer (see Illness), he began recording under the name OUIJA. His debut single, "The Man Who Would Not Die" (2024), taken from the forthcoming album Show Tunes from Oblivion, features guest vocals by Daphne Guinness and was produced with Malcolm Doherty and arranger Rob Shirakbari; it was released alongside a limited edition of fifty individually numbered, hand-decorated lathe-cut vinyl records. A second single, "Morning Star" (2025), was released through Agent Anonyme Recordings, again featuring Guinness and accompanied by a video directed by Fryer.

== Illness ==
Around 2019, Fryer was diagnosed with stage 4 throat cancer and given roughly a 60/40 chance of survival. Treatment involved extensive surgery and about 30 rounds of radiotherapy over nearly two years, and he was told he might lose the ability to speak, let alone sing. He has said the experience directly prompted his return to music, and inspired "The Man Who Would Not Die".

== Selected exhibitions ==
Solo

- Carpe Noctum, Trolley Gallery, London (2005)
- Pietà, Cathedral of Gap, French Pyrenees (2010)
- Nothing is Sacred and the Queen of the Sea, Rook & Raven, London (2014)
- A Light That Never Goes Out, Stubbs Gallery, London (2023)

Group

- Lo Spirito Vola (Pinault Collection), Gucci Museo, Florence (2012)
- Glasstress: White Light, White Heat, Palazzo Franchetti & Berengo Glass Museum, Venice, collateral event, 55th Venice Biennale (2013)
- Art Lovers (Pinault Collection), Grimaldi Forum, Monaco (2014)
- Daydreaming with Stanley Kubrick, Somerset House, London (2016)
- So British! 10 Masterpieces from the Pinault Collection, Musée des Beaux-Arts de Rouen (2019–20)
