= Danyon Loader =

New Zealand swimmer

Danyon Loader ONZM
Personal information
- Full name: Danyon Joseph Loader
- Born: 21 April 1975 (age 51) Timaru, New Zealand
- Height: 188 cm (6 ft 2 in)
- Weight: 84 kg (185 lb)

Sport
- Country: New Zealand
- Sport: Swimming
- Events: Freestyle, butterfly
Medal record
Men's swimming
Representing New Zealand
Olympic Games
Gold medal – first place	1996 Atlanta	200 m freestyle
Gold medal – first place	1996 Atlanta	400 m freestyle
Silver medal – second place	1992 Barcelona	200 m butterfly
World Championships
Silver medal – second place	1994 Rome	200 m butterfly
Bronze medal – third place	1994 Rome	200 m freestyle
Bronze medal – third place	1994 Rome	400 m freestyle
Pan Pacifics
Gold medal – first place	1993 Kobe	200 m butterfly
Gold medal – first place	1995 Atlanta	200 m freestyle
Silver medal – second place	1995 Atlanta	400 m freestyle
Bronze medal – third place	1993 Kobe	100 m butterfly
Bronze medal – third place	1993 Kobe	4x200 m freestyle
Bronze medal – third place	1995 Atlanta	4x100 m freestyle
Bronze medal – third place	1995 Atlanta	4x200 m freestyle
Bronze medal – third place	1997 Fukuoka	4x100 m freestyle
Bronze medal – third place	1997 Fukuoka	4x200 m freestyle
Commonwealth Games
Gold medal – first place	1994 Victoria	200 m butterfly
Silver medal – second place	1994 Victoria	400 m freestyle
Silver medal – second place	1994 Victoria	4x100 m freestyle
Silver medal – second place	1994 Victoria	4x200 m freestyle
Bronze medal – third place	1994 Victoria	200 m freestyle
Bronze medal – third place	1998 Kuala Lumpur	4x200 m freestyle

Danyon Joseph Loader (born 21 April 1975) is a New Zealand Olympic champion and former world record holder swimmer, based in Dunedin. He remains the national record holder in the 400 metre freestyle short course.

He swam for New Zealand at two Summer Olympics (1992 and 1996) and three Commonwealth Games (1990, 1994 and 1998).

== Early life ==
Loader was born in Timaru to Daphne (née Robinson) and Peter Loader.

== Swimming career ==
At the 1992 Olympics in Barcelona, he garnered a silver medal in the 200 metre butterfly. In 1996 in Atlanta, Loader won two gold medals: in the 200 and 400 metre freestyle. He set world records in the short course 200 butterfly and 400 freestyle.

== Personal life ==
Loader is married to Claudia.

In December 2012, Loader starred in an online video campaign supporting same-sex marriage, alongside New Zealand singers Anika Moa, Hollie Smith, and Boh Runga, as well as past Governor-General Dame Catherine Tizard.

== Honours and awards ==
In 1990, Loader received the New Zealand 1990 Commemoration Medal. In the 1997 New Year Honours, he was appointed an Officer of the New Zealand Order of Merit, for services to swimming, and he was inducted into the International Swimming Hall of Fame in 2003.

== See also ==
- List of members of the International Swimming Hall of Fame
- List of Commonwealth Games medallists in swimming (men)
- List of Olympic medalists in swimming (men)
- World record progression 200 metres butterfly
- World record progression 400 metres freestyle

Records
Preceded by Franck Esposito	World Record Holder; Men's 200m Butterfly (25m); 6 February 1993 – 26 March 1994	Succeeded by Franck Esposito
Preceded by Anders Holmertz	World Record Holder; Men's 400m Freestyle (25m); 11 February 1995 – 25 September 1998	Succeeded by Ian Thorpe
Awards
Preceded by Team New Zealand	Halberg Awards – Supreme Award; 1996	Succeeded by Beatrice Faumuina
Preceded by Martin Crowe	New Zealand's Sportsman of the Year; 1992; 1994; 1996	Succeeded by Phil Tataurangi
Preceded by Phil Tataurangi	New Zealand's Sportsman of the Year; 1992; 1994; 1996	Succeeded by Jonah Lomu
Preceded by Jonah Lomu	New Zealand's Sportsman of the Year; 1992; 1994; 1996	Succeeded by Jeff Wilson
Preceded by Anna Simcic	Lonsdale Cup of the New Zealand Olympic Committee; 1992; 1996	Succeeded by Brenda Lawson
Preceded by Chris White	Lonsdale Cup of the New Zealand Olympic Committee; 1992; 1996	Succeeded by Beatrice Faumuina
Preceded by Scott Miller	Swimming World; Pacific Rim Swimmer of the Year; 1996	Succeeded by Michael Klim
Achievements
Preceded by Tim Shadbolt & Rebecca Nicholson	Dancing with the Stars (New Zealand) third place contestant Season 2 (2006 with Hayley Holt)	Succeeded by Brendon Pongia & Hayley Holt
