= Deane Pieters =

Australian swimmer

Personal information
- Full name: Deane Anthony Pieters
- National team: Australia
- Born: 30 July 1968 (age 57) Perth, Western Australia

Sport
- Sport: Swimming
- Strokes: Freestyle
Medal record
Men's swimming
Representing Australia
Pan Pacific Championships
Silver medal – second place	1991 Edmonton	4×200m freestyle
Silver medal – second place	1993 Kobe	4×200m freestyle

Deane Anthony Pieters (born 30 July 1968) is a freestyle swimmer who competed for Australia at the 1992 Summer Olympics in Barcelona, Spain. There he was disqualified in the final of the men's 4×200-metre freestyle relay team, alongside Kieren Perkins, Duncan Armstrong and Ian Brown.

At the 1991 Pan Pacific Swimming Championships in Edmonton, Pieters won a silver medal in the 4x200-metre freestyle. He also finished 4th in the 200-metre freestyle, 10th in the 400-metre freestyle, and 28th in the 100-metre freestyle.

At the 1993 Pan Pacific Swimming Championships in Kobe, Japan, Pieters again won a silver medal in the 4x200-metre freestyle. He also finished 11th in the 200-metre freestyle, and 23rd in the 100-metre freestyle.

Pieters is general manager of business strategy and growth for the West Coast Eagles football club and formerly held the position of general manager marketing from 2001 to 2010, spanning a period of drug controversies centred on the Eagles' playing list.

In 2010 at the age of 41, Pieters won the Rottnest Channel Swim in a time of 4 hours, 41 minutes and 35 seconds, going one better from his 2009 result.
