= Dwade Sheehan =

Australian swimmer

Personal information
- Born: Dwade Aaron Sheehan

Sport
- Country: Australia
- Sport: Swimming
- Event: Freestyle
Medal record
Commonwealth Games
Gold medal – first place	1994 Victoria	4×100 m freestyle

Dwade Aaron Sheehan is an Australian former freestyle swimmer who represented Australia at the 1994 Commonwealth Games in Victoria, British Columbia and the 1994 World Championships in Rome.

Sheehan, who trained at the Commercial Swimming Club in Brisbane, was a member of Australia's gold medal-winning 4 × 100 m freestyle team at the 1994 Commonwealth Games. In addition to the relay, Sheehan also came sixth in the 50 metre freestyle final and was fifth in final of the 100 metre freestyle. He now works as a property developer.
