= Stephen Clarke (swimmer) =

Canadian swimmer (born 1973)

Personal information
- Full name: Stephen Clarke
- Nickname: "Brampton Bullet"
- National team: Canada
- Born: July 21, 1973 (age 52) Sutton Coldfield, Warwickshire, England
- Height: 1.96 m (6 ft 5 in)
- Weight: 91 kg (201 lb)

Sport
- Sport: Swimming
- Strokes: Butterfly, freestyle
- Club: City of Brampton (COBRA)
- College team: University of Florida
Medal record
Men's swimming
Representing Canada
Olympic Games
Bronze medal – third place	1992 Barcelona	4×100 m medley
Pan Pacific Championships
Bronze medal – third place	1993 Kobe	4×100 m medley
Bronze medal – third place	1997 Fukuoka	4×100 m medley
Commonwealth Games
Gold medal – first place	1994 Victoria	100 m freestyle
Silver medal – second place	1994 Victoria	100 m butterfly
Silver medal – second place	1994 Victoria	4×100 m medley
Silver medal – second place	1998 Kuala Lumpur	4×100 m free
Bronze medal – third place	1998 Kuala Lumpur	4×100 m medley
Pan American Games
Silver medal – second place	1991 Havana	4×100 m free

Stephen Clarke (born July 21, 1973) is a Canadian former competition swimmer and Olympic bronze medallist.

Clarke was born in Sutton Coldfield, England, and emigrated to Canada at an early age. He swam for the COBRA swim club in Brampton, Ontario, where he was the first member of the club to make the national team.

Clarke had a distinguished international swimming career, representing Canada at two Summer Olympics and a Commonwealth Games. At the 1992 Summer Olympics in Barcelona, Spain, he won a bronze medal by anchoring the Canadian team in the men's 4×100-metre medley, swimming with Mark Tewksbury, Jonathan Cleveland, and Marcel Gery. He swam in multiple events at the 1994 Commonwealth Games in Victoria, British Columbia, winning a gold medal in the men's 100-metre freestyle (50.21 seconds), a silver in the 100-metre butterfly (54.45 seconds), and a second silver for anchoring Canada's second-place relay team in the 4x100-metre medley relay (3:43.25), together with teammates Chris Renaud, Jon Cleveland, and Robert Braknis. At the 1996 Summer Olympics in Atlanta, Georgia, Clarke qualified for the event finals of the men's 100-metre butterfly, finishing seventh with a time of 53.3 seconds.

After the 1992 Olympics, Clarke accepted an athletic scholarship to attend the University of Florida in Gainesville, Florida, where he swam for the Florida Gators swimming and diving team from 1993 to 1995, and again in 1997. As a Gator swimmer, Clarke won two individual Southeastern Conference (SEC) championships, and was a member of five SEC championship relay teams. He earned twenty-three All-American honors, and was twice recognized as the team's most valuable swimmer (1995, 1997). After taking a year off from university to train full-time for the 1996 Summer Olympics, he returned for his final year of NCAA competition and graduated from the University of Florida with a bachelor's degree in exercise and sport science in 1997.

He was inducted into Brampton Sports Hall of Fame and the Ontario Aquatic Hall of Fame in 1992.

== See also ==
- List of Commonwealth Games medallists in swimming (men)
- List of Olympic medalists in swimming (men)
- List of University of Florida alumni
- List of University of Florida Olympians
