= Alexey Yegorov =

Kazakhstani swimmer (born 1975)

Personal information
- Born: Aleksey Vladimirovich Yegorov; March 21, 1975 (age 51) Temirtau, Soviet Union

Sport
- Sport: Swimming
Medal record
Representing Kazakhstan
Asian Games
Silver medal – second place	1994 Hiroshima	4x100m freestyle relay
Bronze medal – third place	1994 Hiroshima	100m freestyle

Aleksey Vladimirovich Yegorov (Russian: Алексей Владимирович Егоров; born March 21, 1975) is a retired male freestyle swimmer. He competed in two consecutive Summer Olympics, starting in 1996 (Atlanta, Georgia) for Kazakhstan and then for Russia in 2000 (Sydney, Australia). His best Olympic result was finishing in 8th place at the 2000 Summer Olympics in the men's 4×200 m freestyle relay event.
