= Stephen Fahy =

Bermudian swimmer (born 1978)

Personal information
- Full name: Stephen Fahy
- National team: Bermuda
- Born: 10 January 1978 (age 48) Paget, Bermuda
- Height: 1.7 m (5 ft 7 in)
- Weight: 170 kg (375 lb)

Sport
- Sport: Swimming
- Strokes: Butterfly, medley
- College team: Yale University (U.S.)
- Coach: Frank Keefe (U.S.)

Stephen Fahy (born January 10, 1978) is a Bermudian former swimmer, who specialized in butterfly and individual medley events. He represented Bermuda at the 2000 Summer Olympics, and held two Bermudian records in the 100 m butterfly and 200 m individual medley that stood for more than a decade. While studying in the United States, Fahy is also a member of the Yale University swimming and diving team, also known as Yale Bulldogs, under head coach Frank Keefe.

Fahy competed only in two individual events at the 2000 Summer Olympics in Sydney. He established Bermudian records and achieved FINA B-standards of 56.31 (100 m butterfly) and 2:07.25 (200 m individual medley) from the Pan American Games in Winnipeg, Manitoba, Canada. In the 200 m individual medley, Fahy challenged seven other swimmers in heat three, including Trinidad and Tobago's George Bovell, who later became an Olympic bronze medalist in Athens under the same event. He took a fifth spot and forty-first overall by 3.24 seconds behind Bovell in 2:07.92. The following day, in the 100 m butterfly, Fahy placed fifty-fourth on the morning prelims. Swimming in heat two, he edged out Bahamas' Nicholas Rees to escape from last to a seventh seed by almost a full second in a time of 56.46.
