= Michael Wright (swimmer) =

Hong Kong swimmer (born 1966)

Personal information
- Born: 3 March 1966 (age 60)

Sport
- Sport: Swimming

Michael Wright (born 3 March 1966) is a Hong Kong freestyle swimmer. He competed at the 1988 Summer Olympics and the 1992 Summer Olympics.
