= Darren Lange =

Australian swimmer

Personal information
- Full name: Darren Neil Lange
- National team: Australia
- Born: 5 August 1971 (age 54) Toowoomba, Queensland

Sport
- Sport: Swimming
- Strokes: Freestyle
Medal record
Men's swimming
Representing Australia
Pan Pacific Championships
Silver medal – second place	1991 Edmonton	4×100m freestyle
Silver medal – second place	1993 Kobe	4×100m freestyle
Silver medal – second place	1995 Atlanta	4×100m freestyle
Bronze medal – third place	1991 Edmonton	50m freestyle
Commonwealth Games
Gold medal – first place	1994 Victoria	4×100 m freestyle
Silver medal – second place	1994 Victoria	50 m freestyle

Darren Niel Lange (born 5 August 1971), from Toowoomba, Australia, is a former freestyle swimming champion. He competed in the Australian Olympic trials on three occasions to qualify for an Australian Team but fell short, although in 1991, he qualified for the World Championship Team. Darren went on to represent Australia on eleven national teams including the 1992 Barcelona Olympics. Two years later Darren achieved gold and silver medals at the 1994 Commonwealth Games in Victoria, Canada.

While still competing internationally during 1994, Darren began a business career and founded the Darren Lange Swimming Academy, now one of southeast Queensland's largest swim schools.

In 1998, after being out of the water for two years, Darren refocused his goals on making it back onto the Australian Swim Team and was selected to represent Australia at the European World Cup series as well as the Short Course World Championships.

Darren then went on to win a silver medal at the Sheffield World Cup and place 6th in the World Championships in the 50-metre freestyle in a personal best time of 22.12 seconds.

On 23 June 2000, Lange was awarded the Australian Sports Medal. The Australian Sports Medal commemorates the efforts of those who have achieved in Australian sport.

With the goal of performing on the world swimming stage now achieved, Darren turned his attention back to his business career with the purchase of Bird Pool Services in 2006, now rebranded Lange Pool and Spa.

== Life highlights ==
- Gained a scholarship to the Australian Institute of Sport in 1988.
- Made the 1st Australian Team in 1990.
- Awarded the 1991 Australian Swimming's 'Male Rookie of the Year'.
- Gold and silver medalist at the 1991 US Open Winter Championships.
- Former Commonwealth Record Holder for the 4 × 100 m freestyle.
- Highest ranking of the 8th fastest in the world. 1992 50m freestyle.
- Winner of the Darling Downs Sportsman of the Year award 3 times from 1991 through 1993.
- Ranked number 1 in Australia for the 50m freestyle in 1993 and 1994.
- Represented Australia on 11 National Teams.
- Gold and silver medalist at the 1994 Commonwealth Games.
- 1992 Barcelona Olympic representative.
- Multiple Pan Pacific Championship medalist.
- Multiple World Championship finalist.
- Multiple World Cup medalist.
- Awarded the Australia Sports Medal commemorating the efforts of Australians who have achieved sporting excellence.

== Business/community ==
- Founder of the Darren Lange Swimming Academy in south-east Queensland. The DLSA specialises in learn-to-swim (six months to adults), squad swimming, professional school programs, Aqua Aerobics, hydrotherapy and fitness swimming. The DLSA operates out of facilities at Erin Street, Wilsonton, and the Centenary Aquatic Centre.
- Former sports presenter WIN TV Darling Downs.
- Professional motivational speaker.
- Former Patron- Leukemia Foundation (Darling Downs Region).
- Chairman of the 1998 Commonwealth Games Fundraising Committee – Darling Downs Region.
- Gives time, product and DLSA services to local schools and charities. At the launch of the Leukemia Foundation Swim-A-Thon, he raised over $5,000 by swimming 452 laps (11.3 km) in three hours.
- Health Life ambassador for a regional anti-drug campaign.
- The regional 'face' of the Relay for Life Fundraising promotion for cancer research.
- Committee member on the Athlete Advisory Committee for the successful Gold Coast 2018 Commonwealth Games Host City Bid.

Family Life

- Father of two daughters, Emmi and Gracie and husband to Helen

National competitive results:

- 1990 5th 100m freestyle, 2nd 50m freestyle
- 1991 3rd 100m freestyle, 2nd 50m freestyle
- 1992 4th 100m freestyle, 2nd 50m freestyle
- 1993 4th 100m freestyle, 1st 50m freestyle
- 1994 4th 100m freestyle, 1st 50m freestyle
- 1995 2nd 100m freestyle, 2nd 50m freestyle
- 1996 2nd 50m freestyle
- 1999 2nd 50m freestyle

International competitive results:

- 1991 World Championships – Perth Australia.
  - 5th in the 4 × 100 m freestyle.
  - 8th in the 50m freestyle.
- 1991 Pan Pacific Champs – Edmonton Canada.
  - 2nd in the 4 × 100 m freestyle.
  - 3rd in the 50m freestyle.
- 1991 US Open Championships – Minnesota USA.
- 1st in the 50m freestyle.
- 2nd in the 100m freestyle.
- 1992 Olympic Games – Barcelona, Spain.
  - 7th in the 4 × 100 m freestyle.
  - 8th in the 50m freestyle.
- 1993 World Cup Grand Prix – France, England, Germany and Sweden.
  - 2nd in the 50m freestyle in Malmo.
  - 4th in the 50m freestyle in France and England.
- 1993 Pan Pacific Championships – Kobe, Japan.
  - 2nd in the 4 × 100 m freestyle.
  - 4th in the 50m freestyle.
- 1994 Commonwealth Games – Victoria, Canada.
  - 1st in the 4 × 100 m freestyle.
  - 2nd in the 50m freestyle.
- 1995 Pan Pacific Championships – Atlanta, USA.
  - 2nd in the 4 × 100 m freestyle.
  - 4th in the 50m freestyle.
- 1996 World Cup Grand Prix – France, Sweden and Finland.
  - 3rd in the 50m freestyle in Finland.
- 2000 World Cup Grand Prix – England, Germany, Italy.
  - 3rd in the 50m freestyle in England.
- 2000 Short Course World Championships – Athens, Greece.
  - 6th in the 50m freestyle.
  - 7th in the 4x100 freestyle relay.

== See also ==
- List of Commonwealth Games medalists in swimming (men)
