= John Steel (swimmer) =

New Zealand swimmer

Personal information
- Full name: John Meredith Steel
- Nationality: New Zealand
- Born: 27 October 1972 (age 53) Auckland, New Zealand

Sport
- Sport: Swimming
- Strokes: Freestyle
Medal record
Men's swimming
Representing New Zealand
Pan Pacific Championships
Bronze medal – third place	1993 Kobe	100 m freestyle
Bronze medal – third place	1993 Kobe	4×200 m free
Bronze medal – third place	1995 Atlanta	4×100 m free
Bronze medal – third place	1995 Atlanta	4×200 m free
Bronze medal – third place	1997 Fukuoka	4×100 m free
Commonwealth Games
Silver medal – second place	1994 Victoria	4x100 m freestyle
Silver medal – second place	1994 Victoria	4x200 m freestyle
Bronze medal – third place	1990 Auckland	4x200 m freestyle

John Meredith Steel (born 27 October 1972 in Auckland) is a former freestyle swimmer from New Zealand, who competed at two consecutive Summer Olympics for his native country, starting in 1992 in Barcelona, Spain.

Steel won two silver medals (4 × 100 m Freestyle and 4 × 200 m Freestyle) at the 1994 Commonwealth Games in Victoria, British Columbia, Canada. Four years earlier Steel captured the bronze medal with the Men's 4x200 Freestyle Relay Team at the 1990 Commonwealth Games in his hometown of Auckland. Steel now works for Air NZ as a flight attendant.

Despite being from New Zealand he won the 1990 'Open' ASA National Championship 100 metres freestyle title.

== See also ==
- List of Commonwealth Games medallists in swimming (men)
