= Rob Braknis =

Canadian swimmer (born 1973)

Personal information
- Full name: Robert Braknis
- Nickname: Sledgehammer
- National team: Canada
- Born: January 8, 1973 (age 53) Montreal, Quebec
- Height: 1.9 m (6 ft 3 in)
- Weight: 150 kg (330 lb)

Sport
- Sport: Swimming
- Club: City of Brampton
- College team: Florida State University
Medal record
Men's swimming
Representing Canada
Pan Pacific Championships
Bronze medal – third place	1993 Kobe	4×100 m freestyle
Commonwealth Games
Silver medal – second place	1994 Victoria	4×100 m medley

Robert Braknis (born January 8, 1973) is a Canadian former competition swimmer, who competed for his native country at the 1996 Summer Olympics. There he finished in 16th position in the 100-metre backstroke and in twelfth place with the men's relay team in the 4x100-medley relay. Braknis set the Canadian and Commonwealth record in the 50-metre backstroke in 1994.

Braknis is a graduate of Florida State University where he was a 7-time All-American and the Atlantic Coast Conference Swimmer of the Year in 1995.

He was also a torch-bearer for the 2010 Winter Olympics torch relay.

He is a retired police officer for the Peel Regional Police in Brampton, Ontario.

== See also ==
- List of Commonwealth Games medallists in swimming (men)
