= Joe Hudepohl =

American swimmer (born 1973)

Personal information
- Full name: Joseph Bernard Hudepohl
- Nickname: "Joe"
- National team: United States
- Born: November 16, 1973 (age 52) Cincinnati, Ohio, U.S.
- Height: 6 ft 0 in (1.83 m)
- Weight: 163 lb (74 kg)

Sport
- Sport: Swimming
- Strokes: Freestyle
- Club: Shore Aquatics; Cincinnati Marlins
- College team: Stanford University
Medal record
Men's swimming
Representing United States
Olympic Games
Gold medal – first place	1992 Barcelona	4×100 m freestyle
Gold medal – first place	1996 Atlanta	4×200 m freestyle
Bronze medal – third place	1992 Barcelona	4×200 m freestyle
Pan Pacific Championships
Gold medal – first place	1991 Edmonton	4×200 m freestyle
Gold medal – first place	1993 Kobe	4×100 m freestyle
Gold medal – first place	1995 Atlanta	4×100 m freestyle
Silver medal – second place	1991 Edmonton	200 m freestyle
Silver medal – second place	1993 Kobe	50 m freestyle
Silver medal – second place	1995 Atlanta	4×200 m freestyle

Joseph Bernard Hudepohl (born November 16, 1973) is an American former competition swimmer, three-time Olympic medalist, and former world record-holder.

== Early years ==
Hudepohl is a native of Cincinnati, Ohio, and was raised in the suburb of Finneytown. He is a 1992 alumnus of Saint Xavier High School in Cincinnati and graduated from Stanford University in 1997.

== Swimming accomplishments ==
Joe Hudepohl was the youngest member of the 1992 United States swimming team that competed at the 1992 Summer Olympics in Barcelona, Spain. He won a gold medal as a member of the victorious 400-meter freestyle relay team, and earned a bronze medal as part of the 4×200-meter freestyle relay team. Hudepohl also represented the United States at the 1996 Summer Olympics in Atlanta, where he won a gold medal as a member of the 4×200-meter freestyle relay team.

Hudepohl's Olympic accomplishments followed a collegiate and prep swimming career. He was named National High School Swimmer of the Year in 1992 and won multiple NCAA championships while competing for Stanford University. He was also a member of two American record relay teams and part of a world record 400-meter freestyle relay team at the 1995 Pan Pacific Championships.

Hudepohl presently works in the growth equity team of Atlanta Capital, a subsidiary of Eaton Vance.

== See also ==
- List of Olympic medalists in swimming (men)
- List of Stanford University people
- World record progression 4 × 100 metres freestyle relay
