= Swimming at the 1998 World Aquatics Championships – Men's 100 metre backstroke =

Men's 100 metre backstroke at the 1998 FINA World Championships
- Date: 15 January 1998
- Competitors: 34
- Winning time: 55.00 seconds

Medalists
gold medal	Lenny Krayzelburg	United States
silver medal	Mark Versfeld	Canada
bronze medal	Stev Theloke	Germany

The finals and the qualifying heats of the men's 100 metres backstroke event at the 1998 World Aquatics Championships were held on Thursday 1998-01-15 in Perth, Western Australia.

== A Final ==
Rank	Name	Time
Gold medal	Lenny Krayzelburg (USA)	55.00
Silver medal	Mark Versfeld (CAN)	55.17
Bronze medal	Stev Theloke (GER)	55.20
4	Neisser Bent (CUB)	55.21
5	Rodolfo Falcón (CUB)	55.32
6	Matt Welsh (AUS)	55.45
7	Eithan Urbach (ISR)	55.97
8	Ricardo Busquets (PUR)	56.03

== B Final ==
Rank	Name	Time
9	Ralf Braun (GER)	55.92
10	Adrian Radley (AUS)	56.05
11	Mariusz Siembida (POL)	56.30
12	Emanuele Merisi (ITA)	56.38
13	Keitaro Konnai (JPN)	56.43
13	David Ortega (ESP)	56.43
15	Rogério Romero (BRA)	56.45
16	Neil Willey (GBR)	56.75

== Qualifying heats ==
Rank	Name	Time
1	Stev Theloke (GER)	55.11
2	Lenny Krayzelburg (USA)	55.22
3	Neisser Bent (CUB)	55.57
4	Mark Versfeld (CAN)	55.58
5	Eithan Urbach (ISR)	55.62
6	Matt Welsh (AUS)	55.70
7	Ricardo Busquets (PUR)	55.78
7	Rodolfo Falcón (CUB)	55.78
9	Neil Walker (USA)	55.79
10	Ralf Braun (GER)	55.85
11	Mariusz Siembida (POL)	55.88
12	Emanuele Merisi (ITA)	56.24
13	Neil Willey (GBR)	56.24
14	Keitaro Konnai (JPN)	56.30
15	David Ortega (ESP)	56.52
16	Rogério Romero (BRA)	56.77
17	Darius Grigalionis (LTU)	56.78
18	Adrian Radley (AUS)	56.78
19	Carlos Ramos (ESP)	56.84
20	Vladimir Selkov (RUS)	56.85
21	Fu Yong (CHN)	56.94
22	Vladislav Aminov (RUS)	56.96
23	Martin Harris (GBR)	57.01
24	Bartosz Sikora (POL)	57.04
25	Arūnas Savickas (LTU)	57.10
26	Carlos Arena (MEX)	57.15
27	Derya Büyükuncu (TUR)	57.31
28	Nuno Laurentino (POR)	57.44
29	Marko Strahija (CRO)	57.45
30	Miroslav Machovič (SVK)	57.59
31	Tomislav Karlo (CRO)	57.88
32	Attila Czene (HUN)	57.98
33	Örn Arnarson (ISL)	58.01
34	Alexis Perdomo (VEN)	58.28

== See also ==
- 1996 Men's Olympic Games 100m Backstroke (Atlanta)
- 1997 Men's World SC Championships 100m Backstroke (Gothenburg)
- 1997 Men's European LC Championships 100m Backstroke (Seville)
- 2000 Men's Olympic Games 100m Backstroke (Sydney)
