= 1997 FINA Short Course World Championships – Men's 100m backstroke =

The finals and the qualifying heats of the men's 100 metres backstroke event at the 1997 FINA Short Course World Championships were held on the last day of the competition, on Sunday 20 April 1997 in Gothenburg, Sweden.

== Finals ==
RANK	FINAL A	TIME
	Neisser Bent (CUB)	52.77
	Brian Retterer (USA)	53.06
	Adrian Radley (AUS)	53.36
4.	Rodolfo Falcón (CUB)	53.48
5.	Keitaro Konnai (JPN)	53.53
6.	Wei Wang (CHN)	53.75
7.	Josh Watson (AUS)	54.36
8.	Darius Grigalionis (LTU)	54.80

RANK	FINAL B	TIME
9.	Vladimir Selkov (RUS)	53.29
10.	Martin Harris (GBR)	54.04
11.	Stev Theloke (GER)	54.06
12.	Adam Ruckwood (GBR)	54.32
13.	Sergey Ostapchuk (RUS)	54.52
14.	Emanuele Merisi (ITA)	54.65
15.	Mark Versfeld (CAN)	56.62
—	Shamek Pietucha (CAN)	DSQ

== Qualifying heats ==
RANK	HEATS RANKING	TIME
1.	Neisser Bent (CUB)	52.94
2.	Brian Retterer (USA)	53.05
3.	Adrian Radley (AUS)	53.06
4.	Rodolfo Falcón (CUB)	53.22
5.	Wei Wang (CHN)	53.74
6.	Josh Watson (AUS)	53.75
7.	Keitaro Konnai (JPN)	53.87
8.	Darius Grigalionis (LTU)	54.11
9.	Adam Ruckwood (GBR)	54.16
10.	Vladimir Selkov (RUS)	54.23
11.	Martin Harris (GBR)	54.30
12.	Emanuele Merisi (ITA)	54.64
13.	Sergey Ostapchuk (RUS)	54.80
14.	Stev Theloke (GER)	54.91
15.	Mark Versfeld (CAN)	55.01
16.	Shamek Pietucha (CAN)	55.02
17.	Miroslav Machovic (SVK)	55.13
18.	Nate Dusing (USA)	55.21
19.	Daniel Carlsson (SWE)	55.31
20.	Tom Karlsen (NOR)	55.32
20.	Daniel Lonnberg (SWE)	55.32
22.	Mindaugas Spokas (LTU)	55.34
23.	Nuno Laurentino (POR)	55.43
24.	Leonardo Costa (BRA)	55.51
25.	Jan Vitazka (CZE)	55.71
26.	Greg Main-Baillie (RSA)	55.88
27.	Tomislav Karlo (CRO)	55.98
28.	Philippe Meyer (SUI)	56.18
29.	Pablo Abal (ARG)	56.64
30.	Alexis Perdomo (VEN)	56.78
31.	Nicolas Rajcevich (CHI)	56.79
32.	Tane Strickland (NZL)	56.90
33.	Allan Jørgensen (NOR)	57.77

== See also ==
- 1996 Men's Olympic Games 100m Backstroke
- 1997 Men's European LC Championships 100m Backstroke
