= 1997 FINA Short Course World Championships – Men's 200m backstroke =

The finals and the qualifying heats of the men's 200 metres backstroke event at the 1997 FINA Short Course World Championships were held on the second day of the competition, on Friday 18 April 1997 in Gothenburg, Sweden.

== Finals ==
RANK	FINAL A	TIME
	Neisser Bent (CUB)	1:54.21
	Wei Wang (CHN)	1:54.82
	Vladimir Selkov (RUS)	1:55.15
4.	Adam Ruckwood (GBR)	1:55.55
5.	Adrian Radley (AUS)	1:55.67
6.	Emanuele Merisi (ITA)	1:55.92
7.	Keitaro Konnai (JPN)	1:57.63
8.	Sergey Ostapchuk (RUS)	1:57.79

RANK	FINAL B	TIME
9.	Brian Retterer (USA)	1:56.83
10.	Rogério Romero (BRA)	1:57.60
11.	Mark Versfeld (CAN)	1:58.07
12.	Nicolae Butacu (ROM)	1:58.18
13.	Miroslav Machovic (SVK)	1:58.59
14.	Arūnas Savickas (LTU)	1:59.35
15.	Nate Dusing (USA)	2:00.28
16.	Mattias Ohlin (SWE)	2:01.49

== Qualifying heats ==
RANK	HEATS RANKING	TIME
1.	Wei Wang (CHN)	1:55.13
2.	Adam Ruckwood (GBR)	1:55.63
3.	Vladimir Selkov (RUS)	1:56.21
4.	Emanuele Merisi (ITA)	1:56.55
5.	Neisser Bent (CUB)	1:56.85
6.	Adrian Radley (AUS)	1:57.10
7.	Keitaro Konnai (JPN)	1:57.16
8.	Sergey Ostapchuk (RUS)	1:57.89
9.	Brian Retterer (USA)	1:57.96
10.	Rogério Romero (BRA)	1:57.98
11.	Mark Versfeld (CAN)	1:58.00
12.	Nicolae Butacu (ROM)	1:58.67
13.	Arūnas Savickas (LTU)	1:58.75
14.	Miroslav Machovic (SVK)	1:59.02
15.	Stev Theloke (GER)	1:59.25
16.	Nate Dusing (USA)	1:59.43
17.	Mattias Ohlin (SWE)	1:59.99
18.	Josh Watson (AUS)	2:00.08
19.	Rodolfo Falcón (CUB)	2:00.46
20.	Nuno Laurentino (POR)	2:00.72
21.	Leonardo Costa (BRA)	2:00.84
22.	Nicolas Rajcevich (CHI)	2:01.03
23.	Jan Vitazka (CZE)	2:01.20
24.	Greg Main-Baillie (RSA)	2:01.78
25.	Peter Mankoč (SLO)	2:02.32
26.	Darius Grigalionis (LTU)	2:02.45
27.	Jean-Yves Faure (FRA)	2:03.11
28.	Alexis Perdomo (VEN)	2:03.77
29.	Kim Henriksen (NOR)	2:03.83
30.	Luis Díaz (ARG)	2:04.00
31.	Marko Milenkovič (SLO)	2:04.21
32.	Allan Jørgensen (NOR)	2:04.40
33.	Mark Kwok (HKG)	2:05.13
34.	Enzo Marzullo (CHI)	2:06.46

== See also ==
- 1996 Men's Olympic Games 200m Backstroke
- 1997 Men's European LC Championships 200m Backstroke
