= Swimming at the 1997 European Aquatics Championships – Men's 100 metre backstroke =

The final of the Men's 100 metres Backstroke event at the European LC Championships 1997 was held on Saturday 23 August 1997 in Seville, Spain.

== Finals ==
RANK	FINAL A	TIME
	Martin López-Zubero (ESP)	55.71
	Eithan Urbach (ISR)	55.88
	Vladimir Selkov (RUS)	55.97
4.	Emanuele Merisi (ITA)	56.09
5.	Mariusz Siembida (POL)	56.10
6.	Jani Sievinen (FIN)	56.17
7.	Martin Harris (GBR)	56.27
8.	Neil Willey (GBR)	56.37

RANK	FINAL B	TIME
9.	Darius Grigalionis (LTU)	56.26
10.	Ralf Braun (GER)	56.31
11.	Carlos Ramos (ESP)	56.72
12.	Mindaugas Spokas (LTU)	56.98
13.	Volodymyr Nikolaychuk (UKR)	57.20
14.	Marko Strahija (CRO)	57.23
15.	Przemyslav Wilant (POL)	57.32
16.	Nuno Laurentino (POR)	57.58

== Qualifying heats ==
RANK	HEATS RANKING	TIME
1.	Eithan Urbach (ISR)	55.96
2.	Mariusz Siembida (POL)	55.98
3.	Martin López-Zubero (ESP)	56.21
4.	Emanuele Merisi (ITA)	56.39
5.	Jani Sievinen (FIN)	56.42
6.	Neil Willey (GBR)	56.49
7.	Vladimir Selkov (RUS)	56.63
8.	Martin Harris (GBR)	56.64
9.	Darius Grigalionis (LTU)	56.74
10.	Mindaugas Spokas (LTU)	56.76
11.	Ralf Braun (GER)	56.88
12.	Carlos Ramos (ESP)	56.95
13.	Przemyslav Wilant (POL)	57.09
14.	Volodymyr Nikolaychuk (UKR)	57.16
15.	Marko Strahija (CRO)	57.31
16.	Nuno Laurentino (POR)	57.40
17.	Jakob Andersen (DEN)	57.49
18.	Peter Mankoč (SLO)	57.53
19.	Gordan Kožulj (CRO)	57.54
20.	Sergey Ostapchuk (RUS)	57.64
21.	Miroslav Machovic (SVK)	57.86
22.	Lars Kalenka (GER)	58.05
23.	Adrian O'Connor (IRL)	58.17
24.	Hugh O'Connor (IRL)	58.49
25.	Rolf Schwyter (SUI)	58.55
26.	Yoav Gath (ISR)	59.73

== See also ==
- 1996 Men's Olympic Games 100m Backstroke
- 1997 Men's World Championships (SC) 100m Backstroke
