= Swimming at the 1996 Summer Olympics – Men's 200 metre backstroke =

Men's 200 metre backstroke at the Games of the XXVI Olympiad
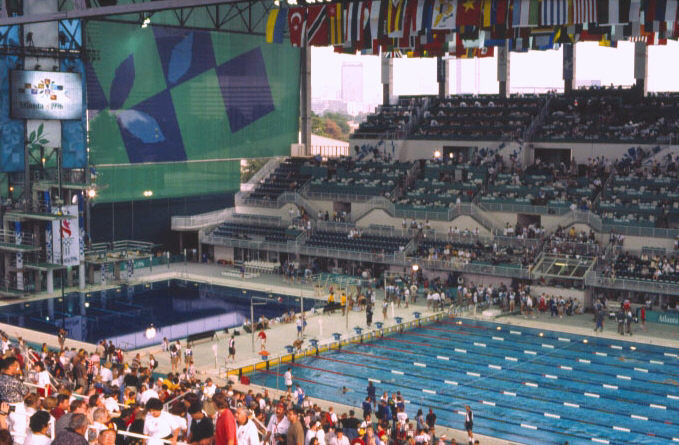
- The swimming pool at the 1996 Olympics
- Venue: Georgia Tech Campus Recreation Center
- Date: 26 July 1996 (heats & finals)
- Competitors: 39 from 33 nations
- Winning time: 1:58.54

Medalists
1st place, gold medalist(s)		Brad Bridgewater	United States
2nd place, silver medalist(s)		Tripp Schwenk	United States
3rd place, bronze medalist(s)		Emanuele Merisi	Italy

The men's 200 metre backstroke event at the 1996 Summer Olympics took place on 26 July at the Georgia Tech Campus Recreation Center in Atlanta, United States. There were 39 competitors from 33 nations. Each nation had been limited to two swimmers in the event since 1984. The event was won by Brad Bridgewater of the United States, with his countryman Tripp Schwenk taking silver. It was the first time since 1980 that one nation had two swimmers on the podium in the event (Hungary took gold and silver then). Bridgewater's victory was the United States' first in the event since 1984 and fourth overall. Italy earned its second consecutive bronze medal in the men's 200 metre backstroke, with Emanuele Merisi taking the honours this time.

== Background ==
This was the 10th appearance of the 200 metre backstroke event. It was first held in 1900. The event did not return until 1964; since then, it has been on the programme at every Summer Games. From 1904 to 1960, a men's 100 metre backstroke was held instead. In 1964, only the 200 metres was held. Beginning in 1968 and ever since, both the 100 and 200 metre versions have been held.

Four of the 8 finalists from the 1992 Games returned: gold medalist Martín López-Zubero of Spain, silver medalist Vladimir Selkov of the Unified Team (now competing for Russia), fourth-place finisher Hajime Itoi of Japan, and fifth-place finisher Tripp Schwenk of the United States. Seventh-place finisher Tamás Deutsch of Hungary was entered but did not start. The medalists at the 1994 World Aquatics Championships had been Selkov, López-Zubero (also the 1991 World Champion), and Royce Sharp of the United States. Sharp did not compete in Atlanta; the American team consisted of Schwenk and Brad Bridgewater. López-Zubero's 1991 world record still stood. He had come out of retirement to try to defend his title, but Selkov was favoured in Atlanta. Emanuele Merisi of Italy had the best time of 1996 so far and was also a strong contender.

Barbados, Chile, Croatia, the Czech Republic, Lithuania, Moldova, Russia, Slovakia, and Thailand each made their debut in the event. Australia and Great Britain each made their ninth appearance, tied for most among nations to that point.

== Competition format ==
The competition used a two-round (heats and final) format. The advancement rule followed the format introduced in 1952. A swimmer's place in the heat was not used to determine advancement; instead, the fastest times from across all heats in a round were used. A "consolation final" had been added in 1984. There were 6 heats of up to 8 swimmers each. The top 8 swimmers advanced to the final. The next 8 (9th through 16th) competed in a consolation final. Swim-offs were used as necessary to break ties.

This swimming event used backstroke. Because an Olympic-size swimming pool is 50 metres long, this race consisted of four lengths of the pool.

== Records ==
Prior to this competition, the existing world and Olympic records were as follows.

World record	Martín López-Zubero (ESP)	1:56.57	Tuscaloosa, United States	23 November 1991
Olympic record	Martín López-Zubero (ESP)	1:58.47	Barcelona, Spain	28 July 1992

No world or Olympic records were set during the competition, with the gold medal time 0.07 seconds slower than the Olympic record.

== Schedule ==
All times are Eastern Daylight Time (UTC-4)

Date	Time	Round
Friday, 26 July 1996		Heats; Finals

== Results ==
=== Heats ===
The eight fastest swimmers advanced to final A, while the next eight went to final B.

Rank	Heat	Lane	Swimmer	Nation	Time	Notes
1	5	5	Brad Bridgewater	United States	1:59.04	QA
2	4	4	Tripp Schwenk	United States	1:59.58	QA
3	5	2	Mirko Mazzari	Italy	1:59.95	QA
4	6	4	Emanuele Merisi	Italy	2:00.01	QA
5	6	7	Hajime Itoi	Japan	2:00.43	QA
6	4	6	Martín López-Zubero	Spain	2:00.77	QA
7	4	2	Bartosz Sikora	Poland	2:00.99	QA
8	5	3	Rodolfo Falcón	Cuba	2:01.20	QA
9	5	4	Vladimir Selkov	Russia	2:01.32	QB, WD
10	4	3	Adam Ruckwood	Great Britain	2:01.35	QB
11	5	7	Ji Sang-jun	South Korea	2:01.39	QB
12	6	5	Ralf Braun	Germany	2:01.50	QB, WD
13	4	1	Olivér Ágh	Hungary	2:01.84	QB
14	3	6	Marko Strahija	Croatia	2:01.95	QB, NR
15	6	6	Ryuji Horii	Japan	2:02.33	QB
16	5	6	Chris Renaud	Canada	2:02.48	QB
17	3	4	Rogério Romero	Brazil	2:03.49	QB
18	4	7	Sergey Ostapchuk	Russia	2:03.50	QB
19	3	1	Miroslav Machovič	Slovakia	2:04.15	NR
20	5	1	Neisser Bent	Cuba	2:04.23	
21	3	2	Derya Büyükuncu	Turkey	2:04.28	
22	2	4	Arūnas Savickas	Lithuania	2:04.38	
23	6	1	Steven Dewick	Australia	2:04.46	
24	3	3	Rastislav Bizub	Czech Republic	2:04.55	
25	3	7	Raymond Papa	Philippines	2:05.09	
26	2	7	Dulyarit Phuangthong	Thailand	2:05.26	
27	2	8	Nicolás Rajcevich	Chile	2:05.79	NR
28	1	4	Nicholas Neckles	Barbados	2:05.88	
29	3	8	Nuno Laurentino	Portugal	2:05.95	
30	2	5	Carlos Arena	Mexico	2:05.96	
31	1	5	Alex Lim	Malaysia	2:06.17	
32	6	8	Martin Harris	Great Britain	2:07.75	
33	2	1	Artur Elezarov	Moldova	2:07.86	
34	6	3	Nicolae Butacu	Romania	2:08.59	
35	2	3	Adrian O'Connor	Ireland	2:08.90	
36	1	3	Gerald Koh	Singapore	2:09.86	
37	2	6	Panagiotis Adamidis	Greece	2:10.22	
38	1	6	Trương Ngọc Tuấn	Vietnam	2:12.05	
39	4	8	Zhao Yi	China	2:13.31	
—	2	2	Fahad Al-Otaibi	Kuwait	DNS	
—	3	5	Volodymyr Nikolaychuk	Ukraine	DNS	
—	4	5	Tamás Deutsch	Hungary	DNS	
—	5	8	Stev Theloke	Germany	DNS	
—	6	2	Jani Sievinen	Finland	DNS	

=== Finals ===
The finals were held on the same day as the heats, 26 July.

==== Final B ====
Rank	Lane	Swimmer	Nation	Time	Notes
9	2	Ryuji Horii	Japan	2:01.54	
10	7	Chris Renaud	Canada	2:01.70	
11	6	Marko Strahija	Croatia	2:01.84	NR
12	3	Olivér Ágh	Hungary	2:02.17	
13	4	Adam Ruckwood	Great Britain	2:02.40	
14	5	Ji Sang-jun	South Korea	2:02.68	
15	1	Rogério Romero	Brazil	2:03.20	
16	8	Sergey Ostapchuk	Russia	2:03.91	

==== Final A ====
Bridgewater took the lead at the first turn, with Schwenk behind him. Both tired late, but Merisi was not quite able to catch either.

Rank	Lane	Swimmer	Nation	Time	Notes
1st place, gold medalist(s)	4	Brad Bridgewater	United States	1:58.54	
2nd place, silver medalist(s)	5	Tripp Schwenk	United States	1:58.99	
3rd place, bronze medalist(s)	6	Emanuele Merisi	Italy	1:59.18	
4	1	Bartosz Sikora	Poland	2:00.05	NR
5	2	Hajime Itoi	Japan	2:00.10	NR
6	7	Martín López-Zubero	Spain	2:00.74	
7	3	Mirko Mazzari	Italy	2:01.27	
8	8	Rodolfo Falcón	Cuba	2:08.14	
