= Swimming at the 2001 World Aquatics Championships – Men's 100 metre backstroke =

Men's 100 metre backstroke at the 2001 FINA World Championships
- Dates: 22 July 2021 (heats, semifinals); 23 July 2001 (final)
- Competitors: 57
- Winning time: 54.31 seconds

Medalists
| gold medal | Matt Welsh | Australia |
| silver medal | Örn Arnarson | Iceland |
| bronze medal | Steffen Driesen | Germany |

The men's 100 meter backstroke event at the 2001 World Aquatics Championships took place 23 July. The heats and semifinals took place 22 July, with the final being held on 23 July.

== Records ==
Prior to the competition, the existing world and championship records were as follows:

| World record | Lenny Krayzelburg (USA) | 53.60 | Sydney, Australia | 24 August 1999 |
| Championship record | Jeff Rouse (USA) | 54.49 | Rome, Italy | 11 September 1994 |

The following record was established during the competition:

| Date | Round | Name | Nation | Time | Record |
|---|---|---|---|---|---|
| 23 July | Final | Matt Welsh | Australia | 54.31 | CR |

== Results ==
=== Heats ===
| Rank | Name | Nationality | Time | Notes |
|---|---|---|---|---|
| 1 | Markus Rogan | Austria | 55.08 | Q |
| 2 | Steffen Driesen | Germany | 55.44 | Q |
| 3 | Randall Bal | United States | 55.47 | Q |
| 4 | Gordan Kožulj | Croatia | 55.56 | Q |
| 5 | Örn Arnarson | Iceland | 55.63 | Q |
| 6 | Péter Horváth | Hungary | 55.67 | Q |
| 7 | Keng Liat Lim | Malaysia | 55.85 | Q |
| 8 | Stev Theloke | Germany | 55.99 | Q |
| 9 | Aaron Peirsol | United States | 56.02 | Q |
| 10 | Matt Welsh | Australia | 56.04 | Q |
| 11 | Josh Watson | Australia | 56.11 | Q |
| 12 | Blaž Medvešek | Slovenia | 56.24 | Q |
| 12 | Alexandre Massura | Brazil | 56.24 | Q |
| 14 | Vladislav Aminov | Russia | 56.25 | Q |
| 15 | Mariusz Siembida | Poland | 56.28 | Q |
| 16 | Emanuele Merisi | Italy | 56.00 | QSO |
| 16 | Eithan Urbach | Israel | 56.00 | QSO |
| 18 | Viktor Bodrogi | Hungary | 56.38 | |
| 19 | Atsushi Nishikori | Japan | 56.39 | |
| 20 | Pierre Roger | France | 56.50 | |
| 21 | Marko Strahija | Croatia | 56.63 | |
| 22 | Miroslav Machovič | Slovakia | 56.70 | |
| 23 | Darius Grigalionis | Lithuania | 56.77 | |
| 24 | Eduardo Germán Otero | Argentina | 56.82 | |
| 25 | Sean Sepulis | Canada | 56.97 | |
| 26 | Haruki Takeuchi | Japan | 57.09 | |
| 27 | Yoav Gath | Israel | 57.16 | |
| 28 | Derya Büyükuncu | Turkey | 57.35 | |
| 29 | Daniel Lönnberg | Sweden | 57.50 | |
| 30 | Martin Viilep | Estonia | 57.77 | |
| 31 | Mindaugas Špokas | Lithuania | 58.00 | |
| 32 | Ioannis Kokkodis | Greece | 58.15 | |
| 33 | Gary Tan | Singapore | 58.52 | |
| 34 | George Gleason | United States Virgin Islands | 58.60 | |
| 35 | Juan Carlos Rodela | Mexico | 58.62 | |
| 36 | Mark Chay | Singapore | 59.28 | |
| 37 | Brendan Ashby | Zimbabwe | 59.71 | |
| 38 | Sergio Cabrera | Paraguay | 59.80 | |
| 39 | Diego Gallo | Uruguay | 1:00.63 | |
| 40 | Eduardo Gil | El Salvador | 1:00.73 | |
| 41 | Ignacio Bengoechea | Chile | 1:00.74 | |
| 42 | Wu Nien-Pin | Chinese Taipei | 1:01.08 | |
| 43 | Christophee Backisavs | Dominican Republic | 1:01.86 | |
| 44 | Aziz Toumi | Morocco | 1:02.28 | |
| 45 | Chi Lon Lei | Macau | 1:03.07 | |
| 46 | Fahad Al Otaibi | Kuwait | 1:03.50 | |
| 47 | Wing Cheung Victor Wong | Macau | 1:05.58 | |
| 48 | Hsu Kuo-Tung | Chinese Taipei | 1:06.13 | |
| 49 | Seung Gin Lee | Northern Mariana Islands | 1:07.05 | |
| 50 | Nuno Miguel Cardoso Rola | Angola | 1:07.96 | |
| 51 | João Carlos Paquet Aguiar | Angola | 1:08.40 | |
| 52 | William Kang | Guam | 1:08.77 | |
| 53 | Rony Bakale | Republic of the Congo | 1:09.55 | |
| 54 | Ganbold Urnultsaikhan | Mongolia | 1:11.77 | |
| 55 | Fahd Bayusuf | Kenya | 1:13.93 | |
| 56 | Hojamammedou Hojamammed | Turkmenistan | 1:22.13 | |
| – | Mohammad Nazeri | Iran | DSQ | |
| – | Mehdi Addadi | Algeria | DNS | |

==== Swim-off ====
| Rank | Name | Nationality | Time | Notes |
|---|---|---|---|---|
| 1 | Emanuele Merisi | Italy | 56.27 | Q |
| 2 | Eithan Urbach | Israel | 56.61 | |

=== Semifinals ===
| Rank | Name | Nationality | Time | Notes |
|---|---|---|---|---|
| 1 | Randall Bal | United States | 54.93 | Q |
| 2 | Örn Arnarson | Iceland | 55.21 | Q |
| 3 | Markus Rogan | Austria | 55.22 | Q |
| 4 | Steffen Driesen | Germany | 55.26 | Q |
| 5 | Péter Horváth | Hungary | 55.38 | Q |
| 6 | Gordan Kožulj | Croatia | 55.42 | Q |
| 7 | Matt Welsh | Australia | 55.47 | Q |
| 8 | Josh Watson | Australia | 55.78 | Q |
| 9 | Stev Theloke | Germany | 55.82 | |
| 10 | Aaron Peirsol | United States | 55.89 | |
| 11 | Vladislav Aminov | Russia | 55.98 | |
| 12 | Mariusz Siembida | Poland | 56.16 | |
| 13 | Keng Liat Lim | Malaysia | 56.29 | |
| 14 | Blaž Medvešek | Slovenia | 56.41 | |
| 15 | Alexandre Massura | Brazil | 56.52 | |
| 16 | Emanuele Merisi | Italy | 56.54 | |

=== Final ===
| Rank | Name | Nationality | Time | Notes |
|---|---|---|---|---|
| 1st place, gold medalist(s) | Matt Welsh | Australia | 54.31 | CR |
| 2nd place, silver medalist(s) | Örn Arnarson | Iceland | 54.75 | |
| 3rd place, bronze medalist(s) | Steffen Driesen | Germany | 54.91 | |
| 4 | Randall Bal | United States | 54.97 | |
| 5 | Markus Rogan | Austria | 55.23 | |
| 6 | Péter Horváth | Hungary | 55.43 | |
| 7 | Gordan Kožulj | Croatia | 55.60 | |
| 8 | Josh Watson | Australia | 55.98 | |
