= Swimming at the 1996 Summer Olympics – Men's 100 metre backstroke =

Men's 100 metre backstroke at the Games of the XXVI Olympiad
- Venue: Georgia Tech Aquatic Center
- Date: 23 July 1996 (heats & finals)
- Competitors: 52 from 44 nations
- Winning time: 54.10

Medalists
1st place, gold medalist(s)		Jeff Rouse	United States
2nd place, silver medalist(s)		Rodolfo Falcón	Cuba
3rd place, bronze medalist(s)		Neisser Bent	Cuba

The men's 100 metre backstroke event at the 1996 Summer Olympics took place on 23 July at the Georgia Tech Aquatic Center in Atlanta, United States.

== Records ==
Prior to this competition, the existing world and Olympic records were as follows.

World record	Jeff Rouse (USA)	53.86	Barcelona, Spain	31 July 1992
Olympic record	Jeff Rouse (USA)	53.86	Barcelona, Spain	31 July 1992

== Results ==
=== Heats ===
Rule: The eight fastest swimmers advance to final A (Q), while the next eight to final B (q).

Rank	Heat	Lane	Name	Nationality	Time	Notes
1	7	4	Jeff Rouse	United States	54.20	Q
2	5	1	Neisser Bent	Cuba	54.83	Q, NR
3	6	5	Rodolfo Falcón	Cuba	55.29	Q
4	5	2	Martín López-Zubero	Spain	55.36	Q
5	6	4	Tripp Schwenk	United States	55.71	Q
6	7	1	Ralf Braun	Germany	55.73	Q
7	5	6	Franck Schott	France	55.77	Q
8	7	3	Emanuele Merisi	Italy	55.82	Q
9	5	5	Vladimir Selkov	Russia	55.87	q, WD
10	6	8	Robert Braknis	Canada	56.14	q
11	7	6	Mariusz Siembida	Poland	56.16	q
12	4	4	Darius Grigalionis	Lithuania	56.20	q, NR
13	6	2	Hajime Itoi	Japan	56.22	q
14	6	7	Stev Theloke	Germany	56.26	q
15	5	4	Neil Willey	Great Britain	56.27	q
16	6	3	Steven Dewick	Australia	56.35	q
16	7	2	Keitaro Konnai	Japan	56.35	q
18	6	1	Chris Renaud	Canada	56.52	
19	4	6	Volodymyr Nikolaychuk	Ukraine	56.71	
19	4	8	Derya Büyükuncu	Turkey	56.71	
21	5	8	Nicolae Butacu	Romania	56.73	
22	3	7	Eithan Urbach	Israel	56.74	
23	5	7	Jonathan Winter	New Zealand	56.92	
24	4	2	Rogério Romero	Brazil	56.94	
25	5	3	Tamás Deutsch	Hungary	56.96	
26	4	3	Zhao Yi	China	57.17	
26	7	5	Martin Harris	Great Britain	57.17	
28	7	8	Mindaugas Špokas	Lithuania	57.20	
29	4	1	Carlos Arena	Mexico	57.40	
30	4	5	Nuno Laurentino	Portugal	57.59	
31	3	3	Raymond Papa	Philippines	57.67	
32	1	4	Alex Lim	Malaysia	57.68	NR
33	3	4	Miroslav Machovič	Slovakia	57.78	
34	3	5	Tomislav Karlo	Croatia	57.89	
35	2	2	Nicholas Neckles	Barbados	57.91	
36	4	7	Panagiotis Adamidis	Greece	58.12	
37	3	1	Rastislav Bizub	Czech Republic	58.29	
38	2	3	Dulyarit Phuangthong	Thailand	58.32	
39	2	6	Kim Min-suk	South Korea	58.43	
40	3	2	Logi Jes Kristjánsson	Iceland	58.53	
41	3	6	Adrian O'Connor	Ireland	58.56	
42	2	5	Sergey Ushkalov	Kazakhstan	58.61	
43	3	8	Artur Elezarov	Moldova	59.24	
44	2	7	Nicolás Rajcevich	Chile	59.90	
45	1	5	Konstantin Priahin	Kyrgyzstan	1:00.26	
46	2	8	Gerald Koh	Singapore	1:00.29	
47	2	4	Mike Fung-A-Wing	Suriname	1:01.24	
48	1	3	Leandro Jorge	Mozambique	1:03.86	
49	2	1	Fahad Al-Otaibi	Kuwait	1:04.27	
50	1	6	Sitaram Shahi	Nepal	1:14.58	
	6	6	Jani Sievinen	Finland	DNS	
	7	7	Alexander Popov	Russia	DNS	

=== Finals ===
==== Final B ====
Rank	Lane	Name	Nationality	Time	Notes
9	8	Keitaro Konnai	Japan	55.74	
10	7	Neil Willey	Great Britain	56.07	
11	6	Hajime Itoi	Japan	56.23	
12	5	Mariusz Siembida	Poland	56.31	
13	3	Darius Grigalionis	Lithuania	56.33	
14	2	Stev Theloke	Germany	56.63	
15	1	Steven Dewick	Australia	56.82	
16	4	Robert Braknis	Canada	57.00	

==== Final A ====
Rank	Lane	Name	Nationality	Time	Notes
1st place, gold medalist(s)	4	Jeff Rouse	United States	54.10	
2nd place, silver medalist(s)	3	Rodolfo Falcón	Cuba	54.98	
3rd place, bronze medalist(s)	5	Neisser Bent	Cuba	55.02	
4	6	Martín López-Zubero	Spain	55.22	
5	2	Tripp Schwenk	United States	55.30	
6	8	Emanuele Merisi	Italy	55.53	
7	7	Ralf Braun	Germany	55.56	
8	1	Franck Schott	France	55.76	
