= Swimming at the 2001 World Aquatics Championships – Men's 50 metre backstroke =

Men's 50 metre backstroke at the 2001 FINA World Championships
- Dates: 24 July 2001 (heats, semifinals); 25 July 2001 (final)
- Competitors: 58
- Winning time: 25.34 seconds

Medalists
gold medal	Randall Bal	United States
silver medal	Thomas Rupprath	Germany
bronze medal	Matt Welsh	Australia

The men's 50 metre backstroke event at the 2001 World Aquatics Championships took place 25 July. The heats and semifinals took place 24 July, with the final being held on 25 July.

== Records ==
Prior to the competition, the existing world and championship records were as follows:

World record	Lenny Krayzelburg (USA)	24.99	Sydney, Australia	13 August 1999
Championship record	New event			

The following record was established during the competition:

Date	Round	Name	Nation	Time	Record
24 July 2001	Heat 8	Randall Bal	United States	25.43	CR
24 July 2001	Semifinal 2	Thomas Rupprath	Germany	25.31	CR

== Results ==
=== Heats ===
Rank	Name	Nationality	Time	Notes
1	Randall Bal	United States	25.43	Q, CR
2	Riley Janes	Canada	25.90	Q
3	Matt Welsh	Australia	25.91	Q
4	Thomas Rupprath	Germany	25.92	Q
5	Mariusz Siembida	Poland	25.93	Q
6	Darius Grigalionis	Lithuania	25.97	Q
7	Tomomi Morita	Japan	26.05	Q
8	Vyacheslav Shyrshov	Ukraine	26.08	Q
9	Péter Horváth	Hungary	26.14	Q
10	Neil Walker	United States	26.17	Q
11	Alexandre Massura	Brazil	26.22	Q
11	Stev Theloke	Germany	26.22	Q
13	Pablo Martín Abal	Argentina	26.23	Q
14	Daniel Lönnberg	Sweden	26.27	Q
15	Neil Willey	United Kingdom	26.33	QSO
15	Josh Watson	Australia	26.33	QSO
15	Ante Mašković	Croatia	26.33	QSO
18	Atsushi Nishikori	Japan	26.34	
19	Markus Rogan	Austria	26.36	
20	Rodolfo Falcón	Cuba	26.44	
20	Eduardo Otero	Argentina	26.44	
20	Blaž Medvešek	Slovenia	26.44	
23	Miroslav Machovič	Slovakia	26.51	
24	Vladislav Aminov	Russia	26.54	
25	Peter Mankoč	Slovenia	26.55	
26	Eithan Urbach	Israel	26.56	
27	Pierre Roger	France	26.57	
28	Kim Min-Suk	South Korea	26.58	
29	Mindaugas Špokas	Lithuania	26.59	
30	Sean Sepulis	Canada	26.62	
31	Alex Lim Keng Liat	Malaysia	26.88	
32	Martin Viilep	Estonia	27.09	
33	Mark Chay	Singapore	27.21	
34	Philipp Gilgen	Switzerland	27.22	
35	Diego Gallo	Uruguay	27.23	
36	Mattias Ohlin	Sweden	27.36	
37	Derya Büyükuncu	Turkey	27.38	
38	Gary Tan	Singapore	27.51	
39	Brendan Ashby	Zimbabwe	28.13	
40	Wu Nien-Pin	Chinese Taipei	28.28	
41	Ismael Ortiz	Panama	28.40	
42	Aziz Toumi	Morocco	28.53	
43	Eduardo Gil	El Salvador	28.74	
44	Chi Lon Lei	Macau	28.86	
45	Christopher Backhaus	Dominican Republic	28.97	
46	Wing Cheung Victor Wong	Macau	30.10	
47	Davy Bisslik	Aruba	30.26	
48	Hsu Kuo-Tung	Chinese Taipei	30.93	
49	João Aguiar	Angola	30.95	
50	Rainui Teriipaia	Tahiti	31.32	
51	Nuno Miguel Rola	Angola	31.55	
52	William Kang	Guam	31.63	
53	Hamid Nassir	Kenya	32.52	
54	Fand Bayusuf	Kenya	33.74	
55	Mahamad Ahmad	Sudan	34.64	
56	Hojamamed Hojamamedov	Turkmenistan	37.41	
57	Carlos Notarianni	Marshall Islands	38.13	
–	Mohammad Nazeri	Iran	DSQ	
–	Gregory Arkhurst	Ivory Coast	DNS	

==== Swim-off ====
Rank	Name	Nationality	Time	Notes
1	Neil Willey	United Kingdom	26.13	Q
2	Josh Watson	Australia	26.16	Q
3	Ante Mašković	Croatia	26.24	

=== Semifinals ===
Rank	Name	Nationality	Time	Notes
1	Thomas Rupprath	Germany	25.31	Q, CR
2	Randall Bal	United States	25.59	Q
3	Matt Welsh	Australia	25.72	Q
4	Mariusz Siembida	Poland	25.82	Q
5	Riley Janes	Canada	25.83	Q
6	Vyacheslav Shyrshov	Ukraine	25.95	Q
6	Josh Watson	Australia	25.95	Q
6	Stev Theloke	Germany	25.95	Q
9	Tomomi Morita	Japan	25.97	
10	Neil Willey	United Kingdom	25.98	
11	Pablo Martín Abal	Argentina	26.00	
12	Darius Grigalionis	Lithuania	26.08	
13	Alexandre Massura	Brazil	26.12	
14	Péter Horváth	Hungary	26.30	
15	Neil Walker	United States	26.40	
16	Daniel Lönnberg	Sweden	26.48	

=== Final ===
Rank	Name	Nationality	Time	Notes
1st place, gold medalist(s)	Randall Bal	United States	25.34	
2nd place, silver medalist(s)	Thomas Rupprath	Germany	25.44	
3rd place, bronze medalist(s)	Matt Welsh	Australia	25.49	
4	Stev Theloke	Germany	25.69	
5	Mariusz Siembida	Poland	25.82	
6	Riley Janes	Canada	25.98	
7	Josh Watson	Australia	26.05	
8	Vyacheslav Shyrshov	Ukraine	26.40	
