= Swimming at the 2000 Summer Olympics – Men's 100 metre backstroke =

Men's 100 metre backstroke at the Games of the XXVII Olympiad
- Venue: Sydney International Aquatic Centre
- Date: September 17, 2000 (heats & semifinals); September 18, 2000 (final)
- Competitors: 55 from 50 nations
- Winning time: 53.72 OR

Medalists
1st place, gold medalist(s)		Lenny Krayzelburg	United States
2nd place, silver medalist(s)		Matt Welsh	Australia
3rd place, bronze medalist(s)		Stev Theloke	Germany

The men's 100 metre backstroke event at the 2000 Summer Olympics took place on 17–18 September at the Sydney International Aquatic Centre in Sydney, Australia.

Lenny Krayzelburg, a Ukrainian-born American whose swimming career began in the old Soviet system, shattered a new Olympic record to claim a gold medal in the event, slashing 0.14 seconds off an eight-year-old standard set by Jeff Rouse in Barcelona. He seized the lead on the first length, and held off a challenge from Australia's overwhelming favorite Matt Welsh down the final lap to touch the wall first in 53.72. Delighted by the frenzied home crowd, Welsh took home with a silver medal in an Oceanian record of 54.07. Meanwhile, Germany's Stev Theloke stormed home from behind to wrest a bronze in 54.82, edging out another Aussie Josh Watson (55.01) by almost two-tenths of a second (0.20).

Poland's Bartosz Kizierowski finished fifth with a time of 55.04, and was followed in the sixth spot by U.S. swimmer Neil Walker in 55.14. Theloke's teammate Steffen Driesen (55.27) and Israel's Eithan Urbach (55.74) closed out the field.

== Records ==
Prior to this competition, the existing world and Olympic records were as follows.

World record	Lenny Krayzelburg (USA)	53.60	Sydney, Australia	24 August 1999
Olympic record	Jeff Rouse (USA)	53.86	Barcelona, Spain	31 July 1992

The following new world and Olympic records were set during this competition.

Date	Event	Name	Nationality	Time	Record
18 September	Final	Lenny Krayzelburg	United States	53.72	OR

== Results ==
=== Heats ===
Rank	Heat	Lane	Name	Nationality	Time	Notes
1	7	4	Lenny Krayzelburg	United States	54.38	Q
2	6	4	Matt Welsh	Australia	54.70	Q
3	5	5	Stev Theloke	Germany	55.00	Q
4	7	5	Josh Watson	Australia	55.09	Q
5	5	1	Bartosz Kizierowski	Poland	55.14	Q
6	5	4	Neil Walker	United States	55.34	Q
7	6	3	Steffen Driesen	Germany	55.39	Q
8	5	3	Gordan Kožulj	Croatia	55.43	Q
9	5	2	Eithan Urbach	Israel	55.44	Q, NR
10	7	3	Alexandre Massura	Brazil	55.58	Q
11	6	5	Rodolfo Falcón	Cuba	55.61	Q
12	6	6	David Ortega	Spain	55.80	Q
13	7	2	Péter Horváth	Hungary	55.81	Q
14	7	8	Chris Renaud	Canada	55.85	Q
15	4	5	Simon Dufour	France	56.01	Q
16	7	1	Adam Ruckwood	Great Britain	56.19	Q
17	6	1	Derya Büyükuncu	Turkey	56.21	
18	6	7	Marko Strahija	Croatia	56.26	
19	4	2	Sergey Ostapchuk	Russia	56.26	
20	5	7	Mariusz Siembida	Poland	56.27	
21	5	8	Emanuele Merisi	Italy	56.35	
21	4	7	Răzvan Florea	Romania	56.35	NR
23	5	6	Rogério Romero	Brazil	56.44	
24	6	2	Darius Grigalionis	Lithuania	56.47	
25	7	6	Mark Versfeld	Canada	56.50	
26	7	7	Volodymyr Nikolaychuk	Ukraine	56.71	
27	4	4	Alex Lim	Malaysia	56.81	
28	4	1	Miroslav Machovič	Slovakia	56.95	
28	4	8	Nuno Laurentino	Portugal	56.95	
30	6	8	Simon Thirsk	South Africa	57.06	
31	2	3	Sung Min	South Korea	57.12	
32	3	2	Blaž Medvešek	Slovenia	57.26	
33	3	7	Markus Rogan	Austria	57.35	
34	4	6	Ouyang Kunpeng	China	57.47	
35	3	4	Philipp Gilgen	Switzerland	57.50	
36	3	3	Mattias Ohlin	Sweden	57.51	
37	3	5	Scott Talbot-Cameron	New Zealand	57.86	
38	1	2	Alexandru Ivlev	Moldova	57.91	
39	3	8	Ivan Angelov	Bulgaria	58.03	
40	4	3	Eduardo Germán Otero	Argentina	58.09	
41	2	1	Diego Gallo	Uruguay	58.18	NR
42	3	6	Milorad Čavić	FR Yugoslavia	58.25	
43	2	8	Dulyarit Phuangthong	Thailand	58.48	
44	3	1	Haitham Hassan	Egypt	58.67	
45	2	4	Gary Tan	Singapore	58.69	
46	2	2	Mehdi Addadi	Algeria	58.74	
47	1	3	Benjamin Lo-Pinto	Seychelles	58.90	
48	2	7	Mike Fung-A-Wing	Suriname	59.06	
49	2	5	Konstantin Priahin	Kyrgyzstan	59.86	
50	1	4	Germán Martínez	Colombia	59.94	
51	2	6	Nicholas Neckles	Barbados	1:00.19	
52	1	6	Pavel Sidorov	Kazakhstan	1:01.02	
53	1	7	Mauricio Prudencio	Bolivia	1:01.15	
54	1	5	Faisal Al-Mahmeed	Kuwait	1:05.17	
55	1	1	Welbert Samuel	Federated States of Micronesia	1:12.38	

=== Semifinals ===
==== Semifinal 1 ====
Rank	Lane	Name	Nationality	Time	Notes
1	4	Matt Welsh	Australia	54.52	Q
2	5	Josh Watson	Australia	54.93	Q
3	3	Neil Walker	United States	55.20	Q
4	1	Chris Renaud	Canada	55.70	
5	2	Alexandre Massura	Brazil	56.07	
6	6	Gordan Kožulj	Croatia	56.26	
7	7	David Ortega	Spain	56.33	
8	8	Adam Ruckwood	Great Britain	56.34	

==== Semifinal 2 ====
Rank	Lane	Name	Nationality	Time	Notes
1	4	Lenny Krayzelburg	United States	54.32	Q
2	5	Stev Theloke	Germany	54.95	Q
3	2	Eithan Urbach	Israel	55.31	Q, NR
4	3	Bartosz Kizierowski	Poland	55.34	Q
5	6	Steffen Driesen	Germany	55.41	Q
6	7	Rodolfo Falcón	Cuba	55.59	
7	1	Péter Horváth	Hungary	55.65	
8	8	Simon Dufour	France	55.79	

=== Final ===
Rank	Lane	Name	Nationality	Time	Notes
1st place, gold medalist(s)	4	Lenny Krayzelburg	United States	53.72	OR
2nd place, silver medalist(s)	5	Matt Welsh	Australia	54.07	OC
3rd place, bronze medalist(s)	6	Stev Theloke	Germany	54.82	
4	3	Josh Watson	Australia	55.01	
5	1	Bartosz Kizierowski	Poland	55.04	
6	2	Neil Walker	United States	55.14	
7	8	Steffen Driesen	Germany	55.27	
8	7	Eithan Urbach	Israel	55.74	
