= Swimming at the 2000 Summer Olympics – Men's 200 metre backstroke =

Men's 200 metre backstroke at the Games of the XXVII Olympiad
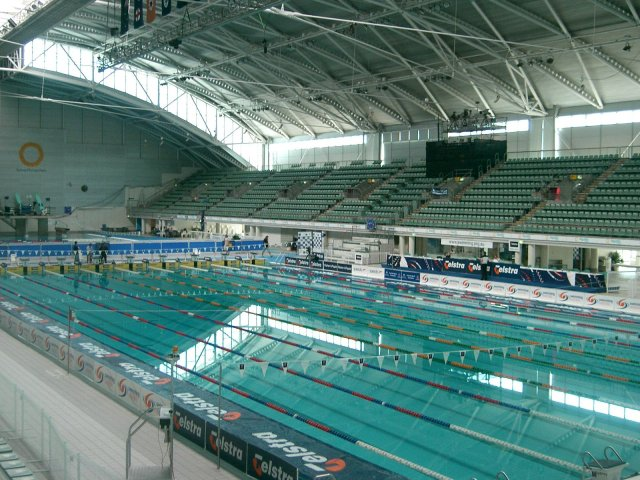
- The pool at the Sydney Olympic Park Aquatic Centre
- Venue: Sydney Olympic Park Aquatic Centre
- Dates: September 20, 2000 (heats & semifinals); September 21, 2000 (final)
- Competitors: 45 from 38 nations
- Winning time: 1:56.76 OR

Medalists
1st place, gold medalist(s)		Lenny Krayzelburg	United States
2nd place, silver medalist(s)		Aaron Peirsol	United States
3rd place, bronze medalist(s)		Matt Welsh	Australia

The men's 200 metre backstroke event at the 2000 Summer Olympics took place on 20–21 September at the Sydney Olympic Park Aquatic Centre in Sydney, Australia. There were 45 competitors from 38 nations. Each nation had been limited to two swimmers in the event since 1984. The event was won by Lenny Krayzelburg of the United States, with his countryman Aaron Peirsol taking silver. It was the second consecutive Games that Americans had finished one-two in the event (Brad Bridgewater and Tripp Schwenk had done so in 1996). Bronze went to Matt Welsh of Australia, the nation's first medal in the event since 1980.

Soviet-born American Krayzelburg became the fourth swimmer in Olympic history to strike a backstroke double, since Roland Matthes did so in 1968 and 1972, John Naber in 1976, and Rick Carey in 1984. He powered past his nearest rivals Peirsol and Australia's overwhelming favorite Welsh to hit the wall first in a new Olympic record of 1:56.76. At only 17 years of age, Peirsol trailed behind by over half a second (0.59) to take a silver in 1:57.35. Meanwhile, Welsh settled only for the bronze in an Oceanian record of 1:57.59.

Iceland's Örn Arnarson came up with a spectacular swim to earn a fourth spot in 1:59.00, holding off Italy's Emanuele Merisi (1:59.01), bronze medalist in Atlanta four years earlier, by a hundredth of a second (0.01). Romania's Răzvan Florea finished sixth with a time of 1:59.05, while Brazil's Rogério Romero (1:59.27), competing at his fourth Olympics, and Croatia's Gordan Kožulj (1:59.38) closed out the field. For the first time in Olympic history, all eight swimmers went under a two-minute barrier.

Earlier, Krayzelburg established a new Olympic standard of 1:58.40 on the morning prelims to cut off Martin López-Zubero's eight-year record by seven hundredths of a second (0.07). He lowered it to 1:57.27 in the semifinals.

== Background ==
This was the 11th appearance of the 200 metre backstroke event. It was first held in 1900. The event did not return until 1964; since then, it has been on the programme at every Summer Games. From 1904 to 1960, a men's 100 metre backstroke was held instead. In 1964, only the 200 metres was held. Beginning in 1968 and ever since, both the 100 and 200 metre versions have been held.

Two of the 8 finalists from the 1996 Games returned: bronze medalist Emanuele Merisi of Italy and seventh-place finisher Mirko Mazzari of Italy. The medalists at the 1998 World Aquatics Championships had been Lenny Krayzelburg of the United States, Ralf Braun of Germany, and Mark Versfeld of Canada. Krazyelburg and Braun were competing in Sydney; Versfeld was not.

The Dominican Republic, Kyrgyzstan, Slovenia, and Ukraine each made their debut in the event. Australia and Great Britain each made their 10th appearance, tied for most among nations to that point.

== Competition format ==
The competition altered the format that had been used since 1984. The tournament expanded to three rounds: heats, semifinals, and a final. The advancement rule followed the format introduced in 1952. A swimmer's place in the heat was not used to determine advancement; instead, the fastest times from across all heats in a round were used. Instead of having the top 16 swimmers divided into a Final A for the top 8 and Final B for 9th through 16th, as was done in from 1984 to 1996, the 2000 competition added semifinals. The top 16 swimmers from the heats competed in the new semifinals. The top 8 semifinalists advanced to the final (there was no longer a classification final for 9th through 16th). Swim-offs were used as necessary to break ties.

This swimming event used backstroke. Because an Olympic-size swimming pool is 50 metres long, this race consisted of four lengths of the pool.

== Records ==
Prior to this competition, the existing world and Olympic records were as follows.

World record	Lenny Krayzelburg (USA)	1:55.87	Sydney, Australia	27 August 1999
Olympic record	Martin López-Zubero (ESP)	1:58.47	Barcelona, Spain	28 July 1992

The following new world and Olympic records were set during this competition, with Krayzelburg setting a new Olympic record each time he swam. All three medalists swam faster than the old Olympic record.

Date	Event	Swimmer	Nation	Time	Record
20 September	Heat 6	Lenny Krayzelburg	United States	1:58.40	OR
20 September	Semifinal 2	Lenny Krayzelburg	United States	1:57.27	OR
21 September	Final	Lenny Krayzelburg	United States	1:56.76	OR

== Schedule ==
The expansion of the event to three rounds also resulted in the event now taking place over two days instead of a single day.

All times are Australian Eastern Standard Time (UTC+10)

Date	Time	Round
Wednesday, 20 September 2000	10:29; 19:31	Heats; Semifinals
Thursday, 21 September 2000	19:21	Final

== Results ==
=== Heats ===
Krayzelburg had the fastest time in the heats, setting a new Olympic record.

Rank	Heat	Lane	Swimmer	Nation	Time	Notes
1	6	4	Lenny Krayzelburg	United States	1:58.40	Q, OR
2	5	4	Aaron Peirsol	United States	1:59.10	Q
3	6	6	Cameron Delaney	Australia	1:59.61	Q
4	6	5	Matt Welsh	Australia	1:59.76	Q
5	4	1	Răzvan Florea	Romania	1:59.79	Q
6	4	8	Örn Arnarson	Iceland	1:59.80	Q, NR
7	5	6	Emanuele Merisi	Italy	1:59.92	Q
8	6	2	Sergey Ostapchuk	Russia	2:00.17	Q
9	4	4	Gordan Kožulj	Croatia	2:00.19	Q
10	5	5	Rogério Romero	Brazil	2:00.48	Q
11	4	6	Chris Renaud	Canada	2:00.51	Q
12	5	7	Marko Strahija	Croatia	2:00.72	Q
13	5	2	Yoav Gath	Israel	2:00.80	Q
14	3	2	Klaas-Erik Zwering	Netherlands	2:00.94	Q, NR
15	4	3	Volodymyr Nikolaychuk	Ukraine	2:01.07	Q, NR
16	4	5	Leonardo Costa	Brazil	2:01.08	Q
17	5	3	Simon Dufour	France	2:01.09	
18	6	7	Adam Ruckwood	Great Britain	2:01.11	
19	6	1	Simon Militis	Great Britain	2:01.20	
20	6	8	Dustin Hersee	Canada	2:01.34	
21	6	3	Ralf Braun	Germany	2:01.35	
22	3	5	Scott Talbot-Cameron	New Zealand	2:01.53	
23	3	7	Blaž Medvešek	Slovenia	2:01.67	
24	2	2	Neisser Bent	Cuba	2:02.05	
25	5	1	Mirko Mazzari	Italy	2:02.13	
26	4	7	Fu Yong	China	2:02.70	
27	3	4	Markus Rogan	Austria	2:02.84	
28	3	3	Alejandro Bermúdez	Colombia	2:03.43	
29	5	8	Guillermo Mediano	Spain	2:03.45	
30	2	4	Mario Carvalho	Portugal	2:03.82	
31	3	6	Miroslav Machovič	Slovakia	2:04.73	
32	3	8	Arūnas Savickas	Lithuania	2:05.06	
33	1	3	Alex Fong	Hong Kong	2:05.47	NR
34	2	6	Eduardo Germán Otero	Argentina	2:05.51	
35	2	7	Torwai Sethsothorn	Thailand	2:05.52	
36	2	3	Ahmed Hussein	Egypt	2:06.10	
37	2	8	Gary Tan	Singapore	2:06.32	
38	1	4	Andrei Mihailov	Moldova	2:06.67	
39	2	1	Lee Jong-min	South Korea	2:07.14	
40	1	5	Ivan Angelov	Bulgaria	2:07.30	
41	1	7	Guillermo Cabrera	Dominican Republic	2:08.22	
42	3	1	Alex Lim	Malaysia	2:08.23	
43	1	6	Miloš Cerović	FR Yugoslavia	2:09.07	
44	1	2	Aleksandr Yegorov	Kyrgyzstan	2:13.85	
—	4	2	Viktor Bodrogi	Hungary	DSQ	
—	2	5	Simon Thirsk	South Africa	DNS	

=== Semifinals ===
Rank	Heat	Lane	Swimmer	Nation	Time	Notes
1	2	4	Lenny Krayzelburg	United States	1:57.27	Q, OR
2	1	4	Aaron Peirsol	United States	1:58.44	Q
3	1	5	Matt Welsh	Australia	1:58.57	Q
4	1	3	Örn Arnarson	Iceland	1:58.99	Q, NR
5	2	3	Răzvan Florea	Romania	1:59.44	Q, NR
6	2	2	Gordan Kožulj	Croatia	1:59.56	Q
7	1	2	Rogério Romero	Brazil	1:59.69	Q
8	2	6	Emanuele Merisi	Italy	1:59.78	Q
9	1	7	Marko Strahija	Croatia	1:59.85	
10	1	1	Klaas-Erik Zwering	Netherlands	2:00.06	NR
11	2	5	Cameron Delaney	Australia	2:00.39	
12	1	6	Sergey Ostapchuk	Russia	2:00.47	
13	2	7	Chris Renaud	Canada	2:01.19	
14	1	8	Leonardo Costa	Brazil	2:02.26	
15	2	8	Volodymyr Nikolaychuk	Ukraine	2:02.27	
16	2	1	Yoav Gath	Israel	2:03.80	

=== Final ===
Rank	Lane	Swimmer	Nation	Time	Notes
1st place, gold medalist(s)	4	Lenny Krayzelburg	United States	1:56.76	OR
2nd place, silver medalist(s)	5	Aaron Peirsol	United States	1:57.35	
3rd place, bronze medalist(s)	3	Matt Welsh	Australia	1:57.59	OC
4	6	Örn Arnarson	Iceland	1:59.00	
5	8	Emanuele Merisi	Italy	1:59.01	
6	2	Răzvan Florea	Romania	1:59.05	NR
7	1	Rogério Romero	Brazil	1:59.27	
8	7	Gordan Kožulj	Croatia	1:59.38	
