= Lee Jong-min (swimmer) =

South Korean swimmer (born 1982)

Personal information
- Full name: Lee Jong-min
- National team: South Korea
- Born: 8 March 1982 (age 44) Seoul, South Korea
- Height: 1.82 m (6 ft 0 in)
- Weight: 75 kg (165 lb)

Sport
- Sport: Swimming
- Strokes: Backstroke

Lee Jong-Min (Korean: 이종민; born March 8, 1982) is a South Korean former swimmer, who specialized in backstroke events. Lee competed only in the men's 200 m backstroke at the 2000 Summer Olympics in Sydney. He posted a FINA B-standard entry time of 2:05.44 from the Dong-A Swimming Tournament in Ulsan. He challenged seven other swimmers in heat two, including Cuba's Olympic bronze medalist Neisser Bent. Because only a single swimmer scratched from his heat, Lee closed out the field to last place by a 2.09-second deficit behind winner Bent in 2:07.14. Lee failed to advance into the semifinals, as he placed thirty-ninth overall in the prelims.
