= Mike Fung-A-Wing =

Surinamese swimmer (born 1978)

Personal information
- Full name: Michael Fung-A-Wing
- National team: Suriname
- Born: 18 December 1978 (age 47) Paramaribo, Suriname
- Height: 1.69 m (5 ft 7 in)
- Weight: 70 kg (150 lb)

Sport
- Sport: Swimming
- Strokes: Backstroke
- College team: University of Georgia (U.S.)
- Coach: Jack Bauerle (U.S.)

Michael Fung-A-Wing (born 18 December 1978) is a Surinamese former swimmer who specialized in backstroke events. A two-time Olympian (1996 and 2000), he holds Surinamese records in a backstroke double (both 100-metre and 200-metre), still standing for more than a decade. While studying at the University of Georgia in the United States, Fung-A-Wing swam for the Georgia Bulldogs swimming and diving team under head coach Jack Bauerle.

Fung-A-Wing's Olympic debut came at seventeen years old for Suriname at the 1996 Summer Olympics in Atlanta. There, he failed to reach the top 16 final in the 100 m backstroke, finishing forty-seventh in a time of 1:01.24.

At the 2000 Summer Olympics in Sydney, Fung-A-Wing competed again in the 100 m backstroke. He set a Surinamese record and a FINA B-cut of 58.31 from the Texas Senior Circuit Championships in College Station, Texas. He challenged seven other swimmers in heat two, including South Korea's 17-year-old Sung Min. Fung-A-Wing picked up a sixth seed on the final lap in 59.06, finishing outside his entry standard, and a 1.71-second deficit from leader Sung. Fung-A-Wing failed to advance into the semifinals, as he placed forty-eighth overall in the prelims.

Since his sporting career ended in the early 2000s, Fung-A-Wing currently works for Toshiba Business Solutions, and as a chairman club's member for Gwinnett Chamber of Commerce.
