= Logi Jes Kristjánsson =

Icelandic swimmer

Personal information
- Born: 21 April 1972 (age 54)

Sport
- Sport: Swimming

Logi Jes Kristjánsson (born 21 April 1972) is a backstroke Icelandic swimmer. In 1996 Logi beat Eðvard Þór Eðvardsson's national records in 200 meters backstroke by 18/100th of a second and in 100 meters backstroke by 3/100th of a second in the national indoors championship. He won the championship in both the 200 meters and 100 meters backstroke categories. He competed in the men's 100 metre backstroke event at the 1996 Summer Olympics.
