= Panagiotis Adamidis =

Greek swimmer (born 1977)

Personal information
- Nationality: Greek
- Born: 2 September 1977 (age 47)

Sport
- Sport: Swimming

Panagiotis Adamidis (Greek: Παναγιώτης Αδαμίδης; born 2 September 1977) is a Greek swimmer. He competed in the men's 100 metre backstroke and men's 200 metre backstroke events at the 1996 Summer Olympics.
