= Welbert Samuel =

Micronesian swimmer

Personal information
- Born: January 5, 1981 (age 45)

Sport
- Sport: Swimming
- Strokes: Backstroke

Welbert Samuel (born January 5, 1981) is a Micronesian former swimmer, who specialized in backstroke events. Samuel became the first ever swimmer to represent the Federated States of Micronesia at the 2000 Summer Olympics in Sydney. He qualified only in the men's 100 m backstroke by receiving a Universality place from FINA, without meeting an entry time. Entering the race in heat one, Samuel closed out the field of seven swimmers to last place in a lifetime best of 1:12.38. Samuel failed to advance into the semifinals, as he placed fifty-first overall in the prelims.
