= Leonardo Costa (swimmer) =

Brazilian swimmer (born 1977)

Personal information
- Full name: Leonardo Jorge Costa
- Nationality: Brazil
- Born: 12 May 1977 (age 49) Belo Horizonte, Minas Gerais, Brazil
- Height: 1.96 m (6 ft 5 in)
- Weight: 94 kg (207 lb)

Sport
- Sport: Swimming
- Strokes: Backstroke, Freestyle
- Club: Trojan Swim Club, Los Angeles
Medal record
Pan American Games
Gold medal – first place	1999 Winnipeg	200 m Backstroke
Silver medal – second place	1999 Winnipeg	4×200 m Freestyle
Bronze medal – third place	1999 Winnipeg	200 m Freestyle

Leonardo Jorge Costa (born 12 May 1977 in Belo Horizonte, Minas Gerais) is a former freestyle and backstroke swimmer from Brazil, who represented his native country at the 2000 Summer Olympics in Sydney, Australia. His biggest success was winning the gold medal in the 200-metre backstroke at the 1999 Pan American Games in Winnipeg, Manitoba, Canada.

He was at the 1997 FINA World Swimming Championships (25 m), where he finished 21st in the 200-metre backstroke, and 24th in the 100-metre backstroke.

Leonardo went to the 1999 FINA World Swimming Championships (25 m), in Hong Kong, where he reached the 200-metre backstroke final, finishing in 6th.

At the 1999 Pan American Games in Winnipeg, he earned the gold medal in the 200-metre backstroke, silver in the 4×200-metre freestyle, and bronze in the 200-metre freestyle. The time of the 200-metre backstroke was 1:59.33, South American record, Pan American record, and index for him to participate in the 2000 Summer Olympics in Sydney. The silver in the 4×200-metre freestyle was obtained with a time of 7:22.92, South American record, along with Gustavo Borges, Rodrigo Castro and André Cordeiro. He also finished 9th in the 100-metre backstroke.

A historic feat achieved by Leonardo, in Winnipeg, was defeat Aaron Peirsol in the 200-metre backstroke final, that after this competition, won several Olympic medals and broke world records in the 100-metre backstroke, 200-metre backstroke and 4×100-metre medley.

At the 2000 Summer Olympics in Sydney, Leonardo ranked 13th in the 4×200-metre freestyle, and 14th in the 200-metre backstroke.

In 2000, Costa broke the short-course South American record in the 200-metre backstroke, with a time of 1:54.79, during the NCAA Swimming Championships in Minneapolis, MN, competing for USC (University of Southern California) and finishing in 2nd place. This record was only beaten in 2005.

Today, Leonardo Costa runs a community program called "+ Natação", in the city of João Pessoa, state of Paraíba (northeast of Brazil) teaching people from the community how to swim in the calm sea.
