= Matt Welsh =

Australian swimmer (born 1976)

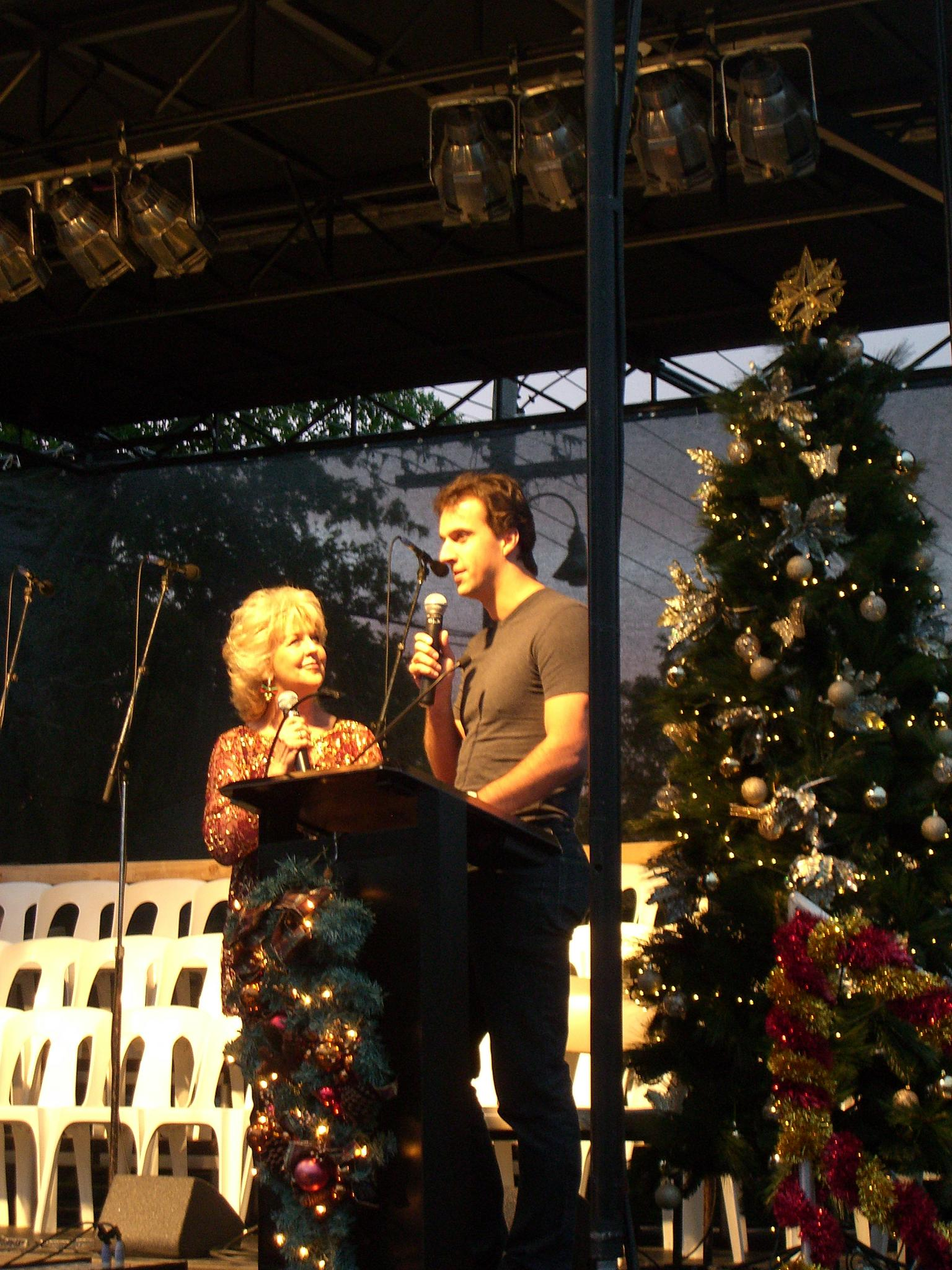
- Welsh at 2008 Mt Waverley Village Christmas carols with his mother-in-law Patti Newton

Personal information
- Full name: Matthew James Welsh
- National team: Australia
- Born: 18 November 1976 (age 49) Melbourne, Victoria
- Height: 1.88 m (6 ft 2 in)
- Weight: 80 kg (176 lb)
- Spouse: Lauren Newton (m. 2006)

Sport
- Sport: Swimming
- Strokes: Backstroke, butterfly
- Club: Melbourne Vicentre; Australian Institute of Sport
Medal record
Men's swimming
Representing Australia
Olympic Games
Silver medal – second place	2000 Sydney	100 m backstroke
Silver medal – second place	2000 Sydney	4×100 m medley
Bronze medal – third place	2000 Sydney	200 m backstroke
World Championships (LC)
Gold medal – first place	1998 Perth	4×100 m medley
Gold medal – first place	2001 Fukuoka	100 m backstroke
Gold medal – first place	2001 Fukuoka	4×100 m medley
Gold medal – first place	2003 Barcelona	50 m butterfly
Gold medal – first place	2007 Melbourne	4×100 m medley
Silver medal – second place	2003 Barcelona	50 m backstroke
Silver medal – second place	2003 Barcelona	100 m backstroke
Silver medal – second place	2005 Montreal	50 m backstroke
Bronze medal – third place	2001 Fukuoka	50 m backstroke
World Championships (SC)
Gold medal – first place	1999 Hong Kong	4×100 m medley
Gold medal – first place	2002 Moscow	50 m backstroke
Gold medal – first place	2002 Moscow	100 m backstroke
Gold medal – first place	2006 Shanghai	50 m backstroke
Gold medal – first place	2006 Shanghai	100 m backstroke
Gold medal – first place	2006 Shanghai	50 m butterfly
Gold medal – first place	2006 Shanghai	4×100 m medley
Silver medal – second place	1999 Hong Kong	100 m backstroke
Silver medal – second place	2004 Indianapolis	50 m backstroke
Silver medal – second place	2004 Indianapolis	100 m backstroke
Silver medal – second place	2004 Indianapolis	200 m backstroke
Silver medal – second place	2004 Indianapolis	4×100 m medley
Bronze medal – third place	1999 Hong Kong	50 m backstroke
Bronze medal – third place	2006 Shanghai	200 m backstroke
Pan Pacific Championships
Silver medal – second place	1999 Sydney	100 m backstroke
Silver medal – second place	2002 Yokohama	200 m backstroke
Silver medal – second place	2002 Yokohama	4×100 m medley
Bronze medal – third place	2006 Victoria	4×100 m medley
Commonwealth Games
Gold medal – first place	2002 Manchester	50 m backstroke
Gold medal – first place	2002 Manchester	100 m backstroke
Gold medal – first place	2002 Manchester	4×100 m medley
Gold medal – first place	2006 Melbourne	4×100 m medley
Silver medal – second place	2006 Melbourne	100 m backstroke
Silver medal – second place	2006 Melbourne	50 m butterfly
Goodwill Games
Gold medal – first place	2001 Brisbane	100 m backstroke
Gold medal – first place	2001 Brisbane	4×100 m medley
Silver medal – second place	2001 Brisbane	50 m backstroke
Silver medal – second place	2001 Brisbane	200 m backstroke

Matthew James Welsh OAM (born 18 November 1976) is an Australian swimmer who is the former world champion in the backstroke and butterfly. He took two golds in 50-meter butterfly and 50-meter backstroke, during one hour, at the World Championships in Shanghai 2006. Welsh retired from professional swimming in March 2008 when he failed to secure a place in the team for the Beijing Olympics.

== Early years ==
Welsh started swimming in his final years at Scotch College, Melbourne and moved into competitive swimming in 1995 after leaving school at the age of eighteen. He trained under coach Ian Pope at Surrey Park Swimming Club until after the 2000 Olympics before moving to the Melbourne Vicentre Club. His first big break came in 1998 at the world swimming championships in Perth, Western Australia with a gold in the 4x100-metre medley relay.

== World and Olympic accomplishments ==
Event	Time	Place	
1998 World Championships
100m Backstroke	55.45	6th	
4 × 100 m Medley	3:37.98	Gold	AR
2001 World Championships
50m Backstroke	25.49	Bronze	
100m Backstroke	54.31	Gold	
200m Backstroke	1:58.80	4th	
4 × 100 m Medley	3:35.35	Gold	
2003 World Championships
50m Butterfly	23.43	Gold	WR
50m Backstroke	25.01	Silver	AR
100m Backstroke	53.92	Silver	AR
200m Backstroke	1:57.94	5th	
2005 World Championships
50m Backstroke	24.99	Silver	AR
100m Backstroke	54.89	9th	
200m Backstroke	2:02.64	18th	
2007 World Championships
50m Backstroke	25.61	8th	
100m Backstroke	54.65	7th	
4 × 100 m Medley	3:34.93	Gold	

Event	Time	Place	
2000 Olympics
100m Backstroke	54.07	Silver	AR
200m Backstroke	1:57.59	Bronze	AR
4 × 100 m Medley	3:35.27	Silver	AR
2004 Olympics
100m Backstroke	54.52	5th	
200m Backstroke	2:01.73	19th	
4 × 100 m Medley	3:39.14	9th	

At 31 and after 11 years on the Australian Swim Team, Welsh was unable to beat the younger generation at the trials and was not selected to compete at the 2008 Summer Olympics in Beijing.

== Swimming-history ==
Welsh has won several world championship titles in both backstroke and butterfly. He first broke the Australian record in the 100-metre backstroke in 1998. He also won more Australian swimming titles than any swimmer in history, claiming his 50th win at the 2006 Australian titles in Brisbane in December 2006.

== Personal life ==
Welsh married Lauren Newton, the daughter of Bert and Patti Newton, and sister of Matthew Newton, on 4 November 2006. They are parents to six children born between January 2008 and August 2020.

== Awards and honors ==
- Australian Sports Medal in 2000.
- Medal of the Order of Australia (OAM) in 2013 for services swimming and charity work.

== See also ==
- List of Commonwealth Games medallists in swimming (men)
- List of Olympic medalists in swimming (men)
- World record progression 50 metres backstroke
- World record progression 50 metres butterfly
- World record progression 200 metres backstroke
