= Zhao Yi (swimmer) =

Chinese swimmer

Personal information
- Born: January 22, 1979 (age 47)

Sport
- Sport: Swimming
- Strokes: Backstroke

Zhao Yi (born 22 January 1979) is a Chinese former swimmer who competed in the 1996 Summer Olympics.
