= Derya Büyükuncu =

Turkish swimmer (born 1976)

Personal information
- National team: TUR
- Born: 2 July 1976 (age 50) Istanbul, Turkey
- Height: 1.93 m (6 ft 4 in) (2012)
- Weight: 90 kg (198 lb) (2012)

Sport
- Sport: Swimming
- Strokes: Backstroke, butterfly
- Club: Galatasaray Swimming
- College team: University of Michigan
- Coach: Zehra Büyükuncu; Jon Urbanchek (U. Michigan)
Medal record
Men's swimming
Representing Turkey
World Swimming Championships (SC)
Bronze medal – third place	2000 Athens	100 m backstroke
European Aquatics Championships
Bronze medal – third place	2000 Helsinki	100 m backstroke
European Short Course Championships
Silver medal – second place	1999 Lisbon	100 m backstroke
FINA World Cup
Gold medal – first place	1998 Canada	100 m backstroke
Gold medal – first place	2006 Italy	100 m backstroke
Gold medal – first place	2006 Italy	200 m backstroke
Gold medal – first place	2008 Italy	100 m backstroke
Mediterranean Games
Gold medal – first place	1993 Nice	200 m backstroke
Silver medal – second place	1991 Athens	100 m backstroke
Bronze medal – third place	1997 Bari	100 m backstroke
European Junior Championships
Gold medal – first place	1991 Antwerp	100 m backstroke
Gold medal – first place	1991 Antwerp	200 m backstroke
Gold medal – first place	1992 Leeds	100 m backstroke

Derya Büyükuncu (pronounced [ˈdeɾja ˈbyjycˈundʒu]; born 2 July 1976) is a six-time Olympic backstroke and butterfly swimmer from Turkey. The 1.90 m (6 ft 3 in) tall athlete at 90 kg (200 lb) is a member of Galatasaray Swimming. His coach is Zehra Büyükuncu.

He participated in six consecutive Summer Olympic Games: 1992 Barcelona, 1996 Atlanta, 2000 Sydney, 2004 Athens, 2008 Beijing, 2012 London. He is one of the first two (together with Lars Frölander) swimmers to participate in six Olympic Games.

== Early years ==
At the age of nine, Büyükuncu became a national swimmer, and won a bronze medal in the 12-year-age category at the 1985 Balkan Swimming Championships held in Bulgaria. At the 1987 Balkan Championships held in İzmir, he won five gold medals. He repeated his five-fold gold medal performance at the 1989 Balkan Championships in Greece. In 1990, he took three gold medals at the Balkan Junior Championships held in Romania.

Büyükuncu earned two gold medals at the 1991 European Junior Swimming Championships in Antwerp, Belgium. That year, he was named "Sportsman of the Year" by Milliyet. In 1992, he won the gold medal at the European Junior Swimming Championships held in Leeds, United Kingdom setting a new European juniors record. In so doing, he became the first ever Turkish swimmer to hold a European juniors record.

Büyükuncu set a Games record in the 200m backstroke event at the 1993 Mediterranean Games in France and won the gold medal. The same year, he won two gold medals at the U.S. Open in Ann Arbor, Michigan and broke the record in the 100 yard backstroke event, beating world champion and record holder Jeff Rouse. Setting a record in the 100 yard backstroke, that is as of 2012 still unbroken, and a record in the 100 yard freestyle, Büyükuncu won two gold medals at the 1994 U.S. High School Swimming Championships. In 1993, he was named the "Male High School Swimmer of the Year" by the National Interscholastic Swimming Coaches Association (NISCA) in the USA. He became the first ever Turkish swimmer to appear on the cover of Swimming World Magazine' in August 1994.

=== University of Michigan ===
Between 1994 and 1998, swimming under Head Coach Jon Urbanchek, Büyükuncu set University of Michigan records in the 100m backstroke, 200m backstroke and 100 m butterfly events. In that time span, he set Big Ten Conference records in 100m and 200m backstroke, and was named the "Most Successful Swimmer" of Big Ten Conference in 1996 and 1998.

== Athletic career ==
In 1996, Derya Büyükuncu earned five gold medals at the 1996 Balkan Championships in Romania. He took the bronze medal at the 1997 Mediterranean Games in Bari, Italy. Winning a gold medal at the 1998 World Swimming Cup in Canada, he became the first ever Turkish swimmer to win an international competition.

In the 100m backstroke event, he earned a silver medal at the European Short Course Swimming Championships 1999 in Lisbon, Portugal and a bronze medal at the 2000 European Aquatics Championships held in Helsinki, Finland.

As of 2012, Büyükuncu holds Turkish national records in 50m, 100m and 200m backstroke events set in 2009. He has been on the Turkey national team for more than 25 years.

== Olympics ==
Büyükuncu qualified to participate at the 2012 Summer Olympics for Turkey. Competing primarily the 100 and 200 meter backstroke events, the 2012 Summer Olympics was his sixth consecutive Olympics.

Büyükuncu was sentenced to permanent deprivation of rights and an arrest warrant was issued for his post on his Twitter account against President Erdogan, who had coronavirus in 2022.

== Media career ==
Derya Büyükuncu participated at the Yok Böyle Dans (Turkish version of Dancing with the Stars) TV Show in 2010 and he got the fourth place. He also participated at the Survivor Turkey TV Show in 2011 and ended up winning the title of "Sole Champion Survivor".

== Achievements ==
Year	Competition	Venue	Position	Event	Notes
1991	Mediterranean Games	Athens, Greece	2nd	100m backstroke	
1992	European Junior Championships	Leeds, United Kingdom	1st	100m backstroke	58.53
1992	Summer Olympics	Barcelona, Spain	5th qual h	100m backstroke	57.38
1992	Summer Olympics	Barcelona, Spain	8th qual h	200m backstroke	2:06.01
1993	Mediterranean Games	Nice, France	1st	200m backstroke	
1996	Summer Olympics	Atlanta, Georgia, United States	27th	100 butterfly	54.89
1996	Summer Olympics	Atlanta, Georgia, United States	19th	100m backstroke	56.71
1996	Summer Olympics	Atlanta, Georgia, United States	21st	200m backstroke	2:04.28
1997	Mediterranean Games	Bari, Italy	3rd	100m backstroke	
1998	World Aquatics Championships	Perth, Australia	22nd	100m freestyle	51.58
1998	World Aquatics Championships	Perth, Australia	27th qual h	100m butterfly	55.73
1998	World Aquatics Championships	Perth, Australia	27th qual h	100m backstroke	57.31
1999	European Championships SC	Lisbon, Portugal	2nd	100m backstroke	53.17
2000	European Aquatics Championships	Helsinki, Finland	3rd	100m backstroke	
2000	FINA World Championships SC	Athens, Greece	3rd	100 m backstroke	52.88
2000	Summer Olympics	Sydney, Australia	15th qual h	100m backstroke	56.21
2004	European Short Course Championships	Vienna, Austria	8th	100m backstroke	
2004	European Short Course Championships	Vienna, Austria	4th	200m backstroke	
2004	Summer Olympics	Athens, Greece	26th pl	100m backstroke	56.34
2004	Summer Olympics	Athens, Greece	22nd	200m backstroke	2:02.69
2004	European Aquatics Championships	Madrid, Spain	13th SF	50m backstroke	26.62
2004	European Aquatics Championships	Madrid, Spain	8th	100m backstroke	56.14
2004	European Aquatics Championships	Madrid, Spain	7th	200m backstroke	2:02.12
2005	World Aquatics Championships	Montreal, Canada	29th	100m backstroke	56.81
2005	World Aquatics Championships	Montreal, Canada	14th sf	200m backstroke	2:01.58
2007	European Short Course Championships	Debrecen, Hungary	10th	200m backstroke	
2007	World Aquatics Championships	Melbourne, Australia	28th	50m backstroke	26.71
2007	World Aquatics Championships	Melbourne, Australia	27th	100m backstroke	56.50
2007	World Aquatics Championships	Melbourne, Australia	18th	200m backstroke	2:01.57
2008	FINA World Short Course Championships	Manchester, United Kingdom	18th	50m backstroke	
2008	FINA World Short Course Championships	Manchester, United Kingdom	18th	100m backstroke	
2008	FINA World Short Course Championships	Manchester, United Kingdom	10th	200m backstroke	
2008	Summer Olympics	Beijing, China	24th	100m backstroke	55.43
2008	Summer Olympics	Beijing, China	22nd	200m backstroke	1:59.86
2009	World Aquatics Championships	Rome, Italy	20th h	50m backstroke	26.07
2009	World Aquatics Championships	Rome, Italy	17th h	100m backstroke	55.78
2009	World Aquatics Championships	Rome, Italy	23rd h	200m backstroke	1:59.49
2010	FINA World Short Course Championships	Dubai, United Arab Emirates	13th	200m backstroke	
2010	European Short Course Championships	Eindhoven, Netherlands	11th	100m backstroke	
2010	European Short Course Championships	Eindhoven, Netherlands	5th	200m backstroke	
2010	European Aquatics Championships	Budapest, Hungary	28th	50m backstroke	
2010	European Aquatics Championships	Budapest, Hungary	22nd	100m backstroke	
2010	European Aquatics Championships	Budapest, Hungary	15th	200m backstroke	

== Recognitions ==
- 1991 Milliyet "Sportsman of the Year"
- 1993 National Interscholastic Swimming Coaches Association (NISCA) "Male High School Swimmer of the Year"
- 1998 "Most Successful Swimmer" of the Big Ten Conference

Olympic Games
Preceded by Hamza Yerlikaya	Flagbearer for Turkey; Atlanta 1996	Succeeded by Kerem Ersü
