= Mirko Mazzari =

Italian swimmer

Personal information
- Born: January 25, 1975 (age 51)

Sport
- Sport: Swimming
- Strokes: Backstroke

Mirko Mazzari (born 25 January 1975) is an Italian former swimmer who competed in the 1996 Summer Olympics and in the 2000 Summer Olympics.
