= Brian Retterer =

American swimmer (born 1972)

Personal information
- Born: 1972 (age 53–54)
- Occupation: Swim Coach

Sport
- Sport: Swimming; Backstroke
- Event: 100-meter backstroke
- College team: Stanford University
- Club: Reno Aquatic Club
- Coached by: Cindy Williams (Reno Aquatic Club); Skip Kenney (Stanford)
Medal record
Men's swimming
Representing the United States
World Championships (SC)
Silver medal – second place	1997 Gothenburg	100 m backstroke
Pan Pacific Championships
Silver medal – second place	1993 Kobe	100m backstroke

Brian Retterer (born 1972) is a retired American swimmer who competed for Stanford University and specialized in freestyle and backstroke events. He won silver medals in the 100-meter backstroke at the 1993 Pan Pacific Championships in Kobe, Japan, and at the 1997 FINA Short Course World Championships in Gothenberg.

Retterer was born in 1972, to mother Cathy Retterer, as one of two siblings. He attended Sparks High School, in Sparks, Nevada, where he was a strong student, and was recognized as one of the most outstanding High School swimmers in the nation who would win both state and national titles. From an athletic family, his older brother Aaron was a nationally ranked high school track athlete, and also competed in swimming, baseball and basketball. As a Junior at the National Junior Olympic swim championships, Brian finished fourth in the 200-backstroke, and third in the 100-yard backstroke, and had three place-winning relays for the Reno Aquatic Club. Brian qualified for Senior nationals in the 100-backstroke. Brian joined the Reno Aquatic Club by the age of 12 around 1985 where he was at least initially coached by Cindy Williams. Retterer was a High School All American in the 100-yard backstroke and 50-freestyle. His top 100-yard breaststroke time was 49.9 seconds, just off 49.5, the American age group record. His top 200 freestyle time was 1:37.7, just off the top national time of 1:36. Graduating Sparks High School in June of 1990, Retterer maintained a 3.9 grade point average and was his schools' salutatorian.

== Stanford University ==
Retterer swam for Stanford University from around 1990-1994 under Head Coach Skip Kenney. At Stanford, he was best known for winning 15 NCAA titles while swimming at Stanford University, most all time for swimming. He is 1 of 2 swimmers in NCAA history that have won a national title in all 5 relays (Shawn Jordan is the other). He was the high point scorer at the NCAA Championships his Junior and Senior year, and was 2nd his sophomore year. He was part of Stanford's recruiting class which was the greatest in swimming history, with Derek Weatherford, Tyler Mayfield, Eddie Parenti, Trip Zedlitz, Bill Schell, & Bob Eastlack. At Stanford, he was an NCAA All-American twenty-five times, and set American records twelve times.

He was the first person to break 46 seconds in the 100yd backstroke and at one time held 7 of the 10 fastest times ever in that event. The 200 Back record stood for 8 years until broken by Aaron Peirsol in 2003. He set the National Age Group record for 17–18 years olds in the 100 & 200 yard backstroke (when swimmers were required to touch the wall with their hands prior to a turn). He was part of Stanford 1992, 93, 94 NCAA championships teams. He set the American Record & US Open record in the 100yd & 200yd backstroke numerous times from 1992 to 1995. He also had the fastest 50yd free split ever (18.56) which stood for nearly 14 years.

In international competition he also performed well. He won a silver medal at the 1993 Pan Pacific Swimming Championships in Kobe, Japan, in 1994 he won a gold medal in the 400 Medley relay at the World Championships in Rome, Italy, and in 1995 he finished in 9th place at the 1995 Pan Pacific Swimming Championships in Atlanta, GA. In 1996, he finished 3rd at the US Olympic Trials, and in 1997 won a silver medal in the men's 100m backstroke event at the Short Course World Championships in Gothenburg, Sweden.

His career was mostly likely cut short due to nagging shoulder problems which forced him to red-shirt during college and have major surgery just before the Olympic Trials in 1996.

== Coaching ==
Retterer served as a swim coach at Middleton Swim Club, Red Bank YMCA, Washington D.C.'s Curl-Burke Swim Club, and at Stanford University where he had also competed. After these coaching assignments, he served as Head swim coach at Trinity Hall School.

== Honors ==
Brian was inducted into Stanford University Hall of Fame. He is also a member of the City of Sparks, Nevada Hall of Fame and the Reno Aquatic Club Hall of Fame.
