= Jan Víťazka =

Czech swimmer

Personal information
- Full name: Jan Vítazka
- National team: Czech Republic
- Born: 27 May 1976 (age 50) Olomouc, Czechoslovakia
- Height: 1.82 m (6 ft 0 in)
- Weight: 83 kg (183 lb)

Sport
- Sport: Swimming
- Strokes: Butterfly, medley
- Club: Kometa Brno
- College team: University of Cincinnati (U.S.)
- Coach: Ondřej Butir; Monty Hopkins (U.S.)

Jan Víťazka (born 27 May 1976) is a Czech former swimmer, who specialized in butterfly and in individual medley events. He is a 2000 Olympian and a six-time Czech record holder. While studying in the United States, he also holds three school records as a member of the University of Cincinnati swimming and diving team from 1996 to 1999. During his early sporting career, Víťazka trained for Kometa Brno Swim Club under head coach Ondřej Butir.

Víťazka, a native of Olomouc, Czech Republic, accepted an athletic scholarship to attend the University of Cincinnati in Cincinnati, Ohio, where he played for the Cincinnati Bearcats swimming and diving team, under head coach Monty Hopkins. While swimming for the Bearcats, he received six All-American titles and held three school records in the 200-yard butterfly (1:45.95), 200-yard individual medley (1:46.40), and 400-yard individual medley (3:49.79). Shortly after his senior season, Víťazka graduated from the university with a bachelor's degree in finance and a four-year MBA. In 2010, he was inducted to the James P. Kelly Athletics Hall of Fame by the university for his stellar performances in the pool.

Víťazka competed in three individual events at the 2000 Summer Olympics in Sydney. He achieved FINA A-standards of 54.21 (100 m butterfly), 2:03.72 (200 m individual medley), and 4:24.30 (400 m individual medley) from the U.S. National Championships in Federal Way, Washington. On the second day of the Games, Víťazka placed twenty-third in the 400 m individual medley. Swimming in heat three, he set a lifetime best of 4:23.81 to race for the fourth seed, a 1.6-second deficit behind winner Alexey Kovrigin of Russia. Three days later, in the 200 m individual medley, Víťazka posted a time of 2:03.66 from the final of seven heats, but missed the semifinals by one third of a second (0.33) with a twenty-first-place effort. In his third event, 100 m butterfly, Víťazka could not achieve his best result on the morning prelims, finishing in twenty-seventh place with a time of 54.34.
