= Georgia Tech Campus Recreation Center =

Athletic arena for university in Georgia, US

Coordinates: 33.775687°N 84.404089°W

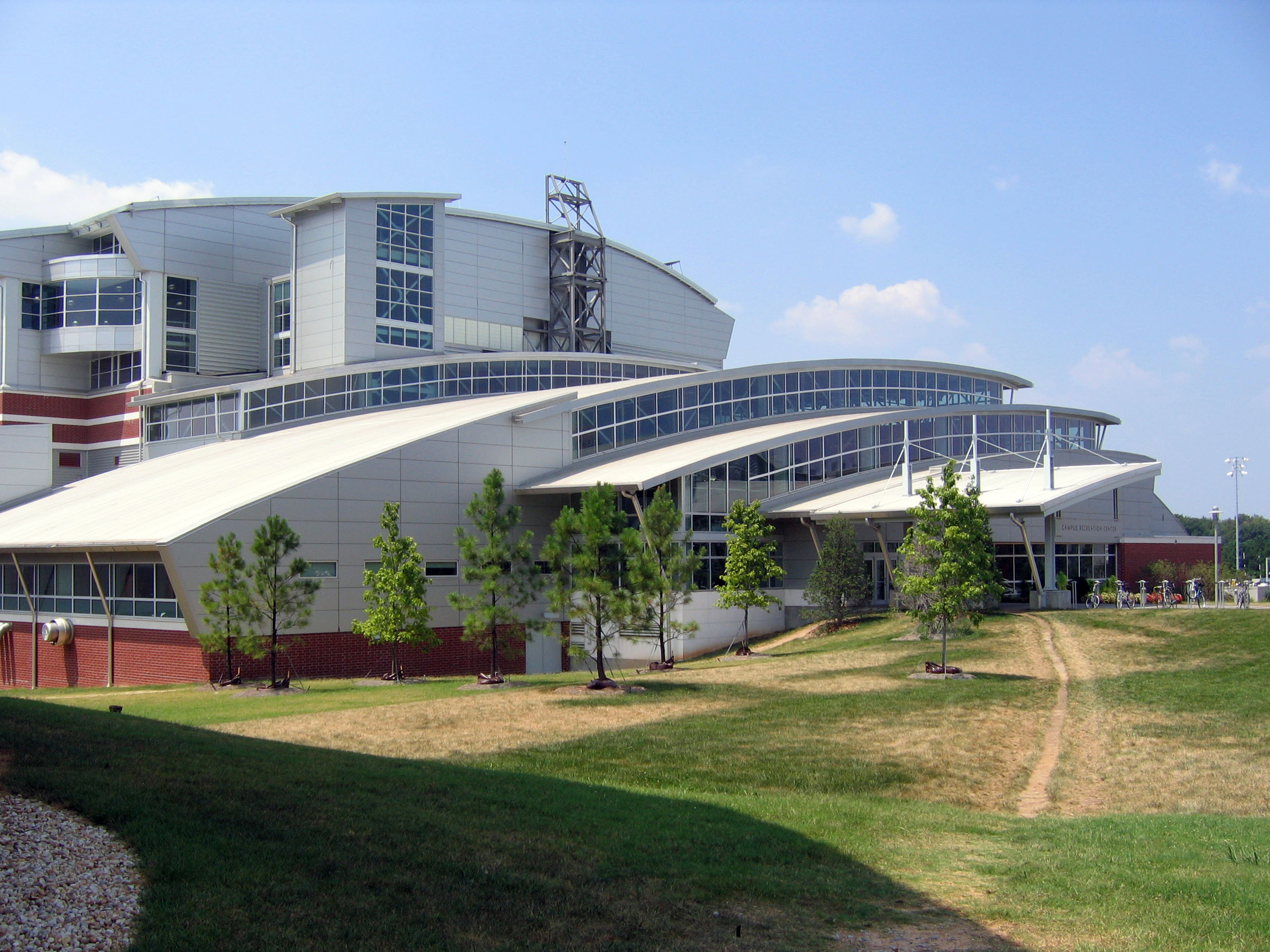
The front of Georgia Tech's Campus Recreation Center

The Georgia Tech Campus Recreation Center (abbreviated CRC, formerly known as the Georgia Tech Aquatic Center and the Georgia Tech Student Athletic Center) is part of the Georgia Tech campus.

== History ==
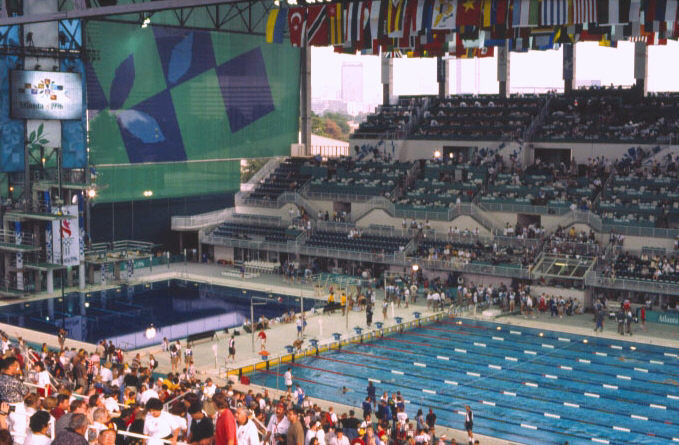
Georgia Tech Aquatic Center during the 1996 Summer Olympics

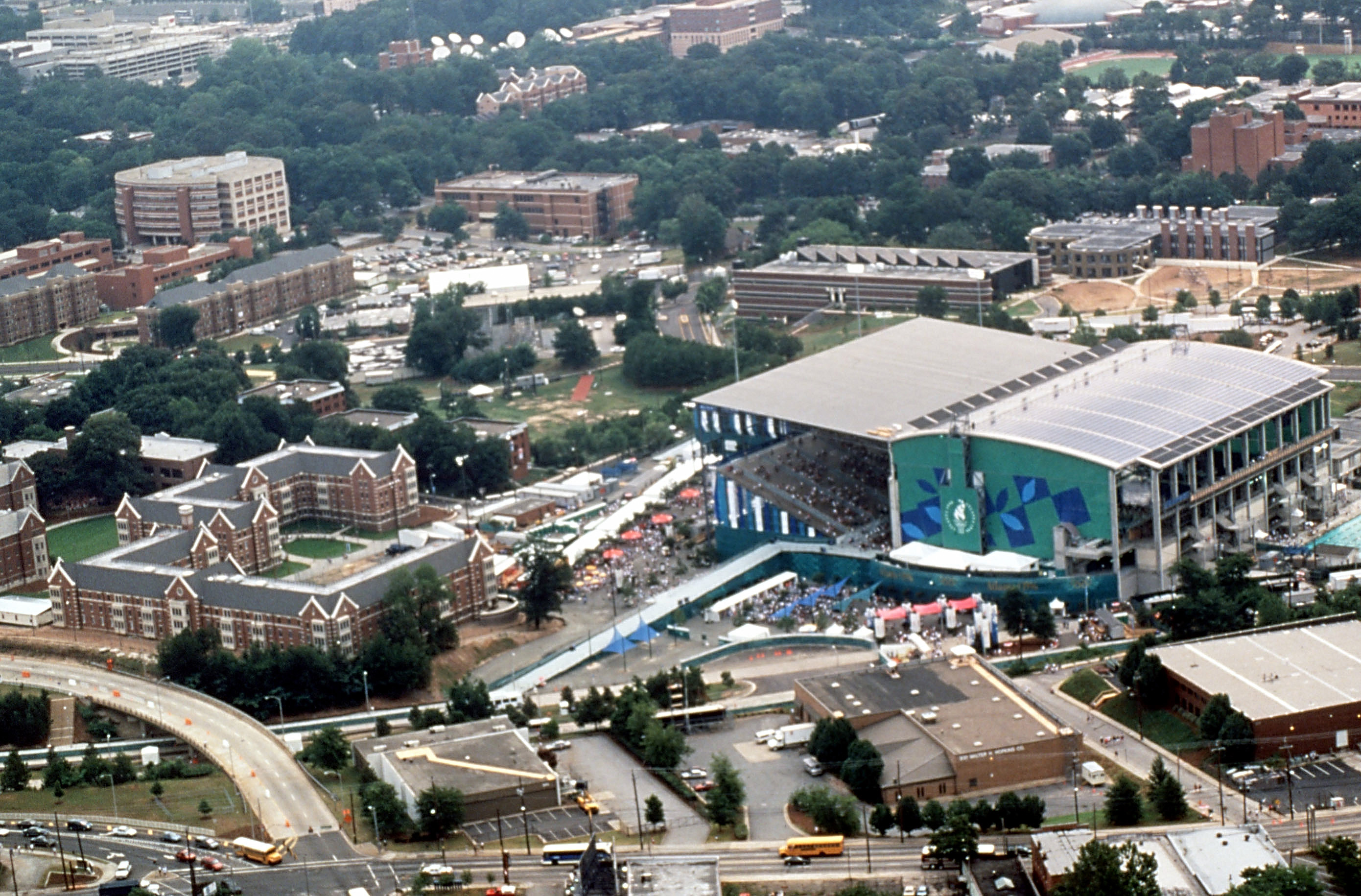
Ariel view of the aquatic center during the 1996 Summer Olympics.

Georgia Tech's athletic center began at its current location in 1977 as the Student Athletic Center, or SAC. Later, Georgia Tech was chosen as the site of the 1996 Summer Olympics aquatic venue, and the Aquatic Center was constructed next to the SAC. The Aquatic Center cost $16.8 million, and featured competitions in swimming, synchronized swimming, diving, water polo, and the swimming segment of the modern pentathlon competition. The stadium had a capacity of 14,600 at the time. It also had a temporary pool for the water polo competitions seating 4,000. After the games, it has been used as a recreational facility for Georgia Tech students and faculty. Initially an semi-outdoor stadium with a roof to protect spectators and competitors from rain, the Aquatic Center was renovated between 2001 and 2003 to enclose the Center completely. The seating capacity was reduced to 1,950. Above the Olympic pool, an upper floor of multi-purpose courts was added by suspending it from the roof; this set a record for the world's largest suspended concrete structure. At this point it was renamed to the Campus Recreation Center, or CRC.

The SAC also had a smaller recreational pool outdoors, which was contained in a pressurized bubble. During the conversion to the CRC, the pool was redesigned to be larger, and was enclosed and fully connected to the rest of the facility.

== Technology ==
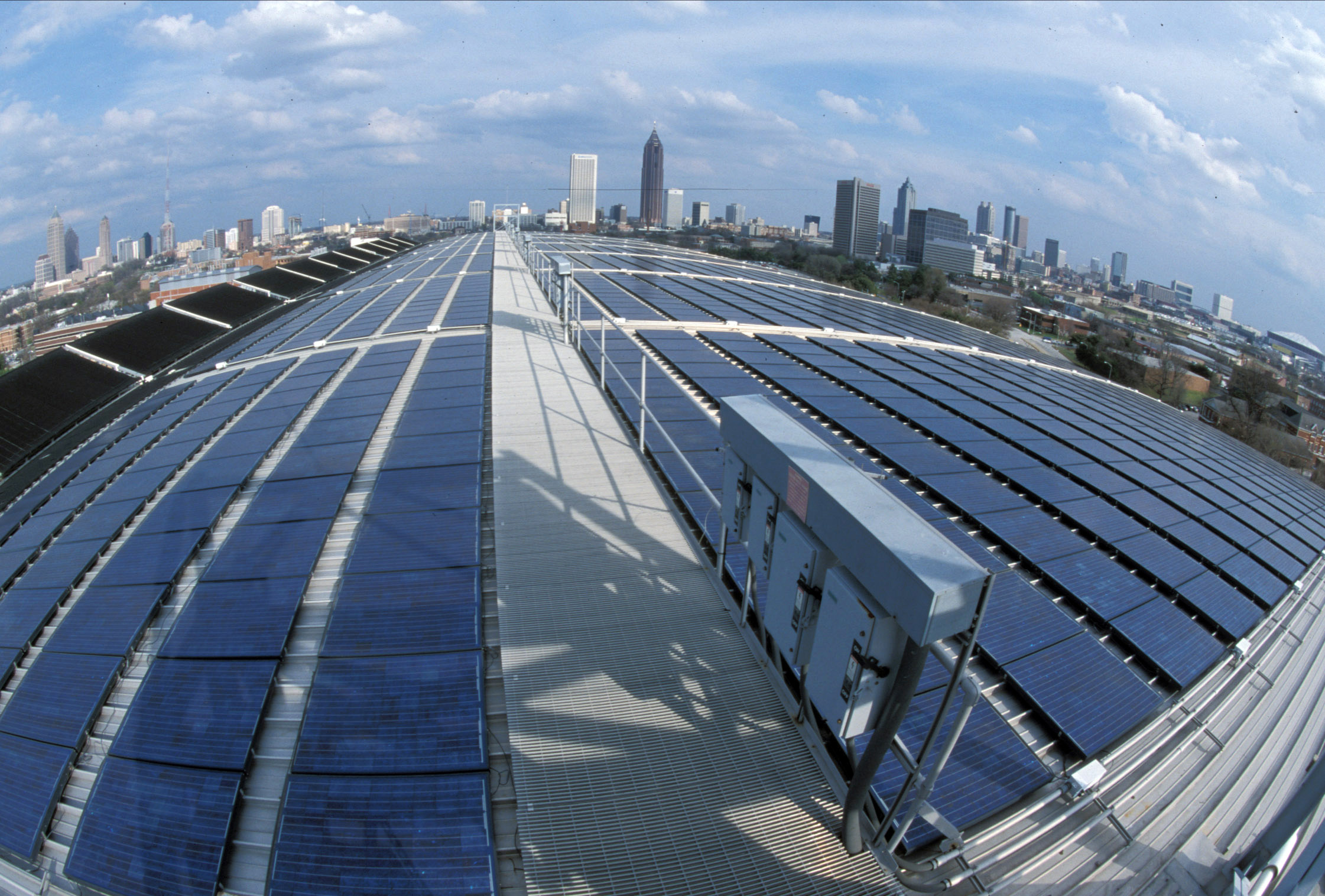
Georgia Tech-designed solar panels cover the roof of the building and supply a significant percentage of its energy.

The roof over the competition pool is entirely covered in Georgia Tech Research Institute-designed solar panels, which produce electricity (up to 340 kilowatts, averaging about 400 megawatt-hours per year) to supplement the Georgia Tech power grid, and also heat pool water which is pumped through pipes in the roof.

The competition pool is configurable for any event, with a removable bulkhead in the middle of the pool, and a false bottom that can be used to adjust the depth and slope of the pool. In addition to the competition pool, the CRC's recreational pool has six recreational lap lanes, a current channel, and a 184-foot-long (56 m) water slide.
