= Marko Strahija =

Croatian swimmer

Personal information
- Born: 28 May 1975 (age 51) Zagreb
- Height: 200 cm (6 ft 7 in)
- Weight: 84 kg (185 lb)

Sport
- Sport: Swimming
Medal record
Men's swimming
Representing Croatia
World Championships (SC)
| Silver medal – second place | 2002 Moscow | 200 m backstroke |
European Championships (LC)
| Bronze medal – third place | 2002 Berlin | 200 m backstroke |
Mediterranean Games
| Gold medal – first place | 2001 Tunis | 200 m backstroke |
| Silver medal – second place | 2001 Tunis | 4x100 m medley |

Marko Strahija (born 28 May 1975 in Zagreb) is a backstroke swimmer from Croatia, who competed at three Summer Olympics between 1996 and 2008.

== Early career ==
Marko attended The Ohio State University and held university records in the 100 and 200 backstroke before the times were eclipsed by RJ Lemyre.

In Atlanta, United States, he finished in 11th position (B-Final) in the Men's 200 m backstroke, and was eliminated in the heats of the Men's 4 × 200 m freestyle relay, alongside Gordan Kožulj, Miroslav Vučetić, and Marijan Kanjer. Strahija won the silver medal, behind Aaron Peirsol of the United States, in the 200 m backstroke at the 2002 FINA Short Course World Championships.

== Doping suspension and exoneration ==
Strahija's urine sample, taken in an out-of-competition control in July 2002, tested positive for human chorionic gonadotropin (hCG). Since hCG is a known tumor marker, Strahija underwent medical tests that found nothing suspicious. He maintained his innocence and disputed scientific validity of testing for hCG. Nevertheless, in 2003 he received a two-year suspension.

In October 2007 Strahija again tested positive for hCG, which caused him to miss the European Short Course Championships held in December that year. This time, subsequent medical tests found testicular cancer, and Strahija immediately underwent surgery. In February 2008, the International Swimming Federation exonerated Strahija, lifting his provisional suspension. He made a successful recovery, taking part in the 2008 Summer Olympics.

== Olympic results ==
Olympic results
| Event | 1996 Atlanta | 2000 Sydney | 2004 Athens | 2008 Beijing |
|---|---|---|---|---|
| 100 metre backstroke | —N/a | 18th 56.26 | —N/a | 34th 55.89 |
| 200 metre backstroke | 11th 2:01.84 | 9th 1:59.85 | —N/a | —N/a |
| 4 × 200 metre freestyle relay | 13th 7:43.69 | —N/a | —N/a | —N/a |
