= Carlos Arena =

Mexican swimmer (born 1975)

Personal information
- Born: 2 August 1975 (age 50)

Sport
- Sport: Swimming

Carlos Arena (born 2 August 1975) is a Mexican swimmer. He competed in two events at the 1996 Summer Olympics.
