= Mindaugas Špokas =

Lithuanian swimmer (born 1975)

Personal information
- Born: 13 May 1975 (age 51) Kaunas, Lithuanian SSR, Soviet Union

Sport
- Sport: Swimming

Mindaugas Špokas (born 13 May 1975) is a Lithuanian swimmer. He competed in the men's 100 metre backstroke event at the 1996 Summer Olympics.

He is the director of the national sports agency.
