= Rogério Romero =

Brazilian swimmer (born 1969)

Personal information
- Full name: Rogério Aoki Romero
- Born: 22 November 1969 (age 56) Londrina, Paraná, Brazil
- Height: 1.81 m (5 ft 11 in)
- Weight: 72 kg (159 lb)

Sport
- Sport: Swimming
- Strokes: Backstroke
- Club: Minas Tênis Clube, Belo Horizonte
Medal record
Pan American Games
Gold medal – first place	1991 Havana	200 m backstroke
Gold medal – first place	2003 S. Domingo	200 m backstroke
Silver medal – second place	1995 Mar del Plata	4x100 m medley
Bronze medal – third place	1995 Mar del Plata	200 m backstroke

Rogério Aoki Romero (born 22 November 1969 in Londrina, Paraná) is a former backstroke swimmer from Brazil, who competed at five consecutive Summer Olympics for his native country, starting in 1988. A resident of Belo Horizonte, he won the gold medal in the 200-metre backstroke at the 1991 Pan American Games in Havana, Cuba. Twelve years later he once again did so at the 2003 Pan Am Games.

== International career ==
At 18 years old, Romero was at the 1988 Summer Olympics in Seoul, where he finished 8th place in the 200-metre backstroke, 20th in the 100-metre backstroke, and 18th in the 4×100-metre medley. At the 200-metre backstroke, he broke his first South American record, with a time of 2:02.26 at heats.

At the 1989 Pan Pacific Swimming Championships, Romero finished 6th in the 200-metre backstroke.

Participating in the 1991 World Aquatics Championships in Perth, he finished 13th in the 200-metre backstroke, and 20th in the 100-metre backstroke.

At the 1991 Pan American Games in Havana, he won the gold medal in the 200-metre backstroke. Romero also finished 5th in the 100-metre backstroke.

Romero was in 1992 Summer Olympics in Barcelona, where he finished 10th place in the 200-metre backstroke, and 21st in the 100-metre backstroke.

At the 1993 FINA World Swimming Championships (25m), in Palma de Mallorca, Romero twice broke the South American record in the 200-metre backstroke, earning 1:57.35 in the heats, and 1:55.90 in the finals, finishing 4th. He also finished 5th in the 4×100-metre medley, along with Maurício Menezes, Gustavo Borges and José Carlos Souza.

Participating in the 1994 World Aquatics Championships, held in September in Rome, Italy, the Brazilian got the 12th place in the 200-metre backstroke, and the 21st place in the 100-metre backstroke.

At the 1995 Pan American Games in Mar del Plata, he won the silver medal in the 4×100-metre medley and bronze in the 200-metre backstroke. He also finished 4th in the 100-metre backstroke.

At the 1995 FINA World Swimming Championships (25 m) in Rio de Janeiro, he finished 7th in the 100-metre backstroke, with a time of 54.61. He also swam the 200-metre backstroke.

Romero was in 1996 Summer Olympics in Atlanta, where he finished 15th in the 200-metre backstroke, and 24th in the 100-metre backstroke.

He was at the 1997 FINA World Swimming Championships (25 m), where he finished 10th in the 200-metre backstroke.

Participating in the 1998 World Aquatics Championships in Perth, he got the 13th place in the 200-metre backstroke, and 15th in the 100-metre backstroke.

In December 1999, he broke the long course South American record of the 200-metre backstroke for the last time, with a time of 1:59.23. His record was only broken in 2007 Pan Am Games by Thiago Pereira.

Romero was in 2000 Summer Olympics in Sydney, where he finished 7th place in the 200-metre backstroke (his best Olympic participation), and 24th in the 100-metre backstroke.

Participating in the 2002 FINA World Swimming Championships (25 m) in Moscow, he got the 21st place in the 200-metre backstroke, and 28th in the 100-metre backstroke.

At the 2003 World Aquatics Championships in Barcelona, finished 26th in the 200-metre backstroke.

At the 2003 Pan American Games in Santo Domingo, he won the gold medal in the 200-metre backstroke. Romero also finished 9th in the 100-metre backstroke.

Romero was in 2004 Summer Olympics in Athens, where he finished 15th place in the 200-metre backstroke.

He was for many years the South American record holder, a total of 29 South American records and 41 Brazilian records. Pan American champion, 15 times champion in 200-metre backstroke Brazil Swimming Trophy, 10 times South American champion in the 200-metre backstroke, all os this in 27 years of sports career.

== After professional swimming ==
Between 2004 and 2006, Romero was Under-Secretary of Sports, of the state of Minas Gerais. In 2007, he held the position of Deputy Secretary, of the Department of Sports and Youth of Minas Gerais. In 2013, he was the President of the National Forum of State Secretaries and Managers of Sport and Leisure.
