= Neil Willey =

British swimmer

Personal information
- Full name: Neil Edward Willey
- Nationality: British
- Born: 11 September 1976 (age 49) Enfield, Greater London, England
- Height: 1.85 m (6 ft 1 in)
- Weight: 80 kg (176 lb)

Sport
- Sport: Swimming
- Strokes: Backstroke
Medal record
Men's swimming
Representing Great Britain
World Championships (SC)
Silver medal – second place	1995 Rio de Janeiro	100 m backstroke
Bronze medal – third place	1999 Hong Kong	4×100 m medley
Bronze medal – third place	2000 Athens	4×100 m medley
European Championships (SC)
Bronze medal – third place	1996 Riesa	4×50 m medley
Bronze medal – third place	1999 Lisbon	4×50 m medley
Representing England
Commonwealth Games
Bronze medal – third place	1998 Kuala Lumpur	4×100 m medley

Neil Edward Willey (born 11 September 1976) is a male former international backstroke swimmer from England.

== Swimming career ==
Willey represented Great Britain twice at the Summer Olympics: in 1996 (Atlanta, Georgia) and 2000 (Sydney, Australia).

He represented England principally in the backstroke events but also won a silver medal in the 4 x 100 metres medley relay event, at the 1998 Commonwealth Games in Kuala Lumpur, Malaysia.

Willey won several medals (silver and bronze) in the 1990s as a member of the British short course (25 m) relay teams. At the ASA National British Championships he won the 50 metres backstroke title three times (1995, 1997, 2001) and the 100 metres backstroke title twice (1995, 1997).

== See also ==
- List of Commonwealth Games medallists in swimming (men)
