= 1997 FINA World Swimming Championships (25 m) =

- Host city: Gothenburg
- Country: Sweden
- Opening: 17 April 1997
- Closing: 20 April 1997
- Main venue: Scandinavium

The 3rd FINA World Swimming Championships (25 m) were an international swimming meet organized by FINA. It was held at the Scandinavium in Gothenburg, Sweden April 17−20, 1997; and featured 501 swimmers from 71 nations.

== Competing nations ==
The 71 nations with swimmers at the 1997 Short Course Worlds were:

- Angola
- Argentina
- Australia
- Austria
- Bahamas
- Barbados
- Belarus
- Brazil
- Canada
- Chile
- China
- Colombia
- Costa Rica
- Croatia
- Cuba
- Cyprus
- Czech Republic
- Denmark
- Ecuador
- Estonia
- France
- Germany
- Great Britain
- Greece
- Hong Kong
- Iceland
- Indonesia
- Israel
- Italy
- Jamaica
- Japan
- Kazakhstan
- Kyrgyzstan
- Latvia
- Lithuania
- Luxembourg
- Macedonia
- Madagascar
- Mexico
- Netherlands
- New Zealand
- Norway
- Peru
- Poland
- Portugal
- Puerto Rico
- Romania
- Russia
- Singapore
- Slovakia
- Slovenia
- South Africa
- Spain
- Sweden
- Switzerland
- Thailand
- Trinidad and Tobago
- Ukraine
- USA
- Uzbekistan
- Venezuela

== Results ==
=== Men ===
Event	Gold		Silver		Bronze	
50 m freestyle	Francisco Sánchez; Venezuela	21.80	Mark Foster (United Kingdom) Great Britain	22.03	Ricardo Busquets; Puerto Rico	22.17
100 m freestyle	Francisco Sánchez; Venezuela	47.86	Gustavo Borges; Brazil	48.16	Michael Klim; Australia	48.21
200 m freestyle	Gustavo Borges; Brazil	1:45.45	Trent Bray; New Zealand	1:45.81	Lars Conrad; Germany	1:46.44
400 m freestyle	Jacob Carstensen; Denmark	3:43.44	Chad Carvin (United States) USA	3:43.73	Grant Hackett; Australia	3:43.83
1500 m freestyle	Grant Hackett; Australia	14:39.54	Jörg Hoffmann; Germany	14:40.67	Graeme Smith (United Kingdom) Great Britain	14:46.85
100 m backstroke	Neisser Bent; Cuba	52.77	Brian Retterer (United States) USA	53.06	Adrian Radley; Australia	53.36
200 m backstroke	Neisser Bent; Cuba	1:54.21	Wang Wei; China	1:54.82	Vladimir Selkov; Russia	1:55.15
100 m breaststroke	Patrik Isaksson; Sweden	59.99	Stanislav Lopukhov; Russia	1:00.05	Jens Kruppa; Germany	1:00.18
200 m breaststroke	Aleksandr Gukov; Belarus	2:09.25	Andrey Korneyev; Russia	2:09.28	Jens Kruppa; Germany	2.10.53
100 m butterfly	Lars Frölander; Sweden	51.95	Geoff Huegill; Australia	51.99	Michael Klim; Australia	52.02
200 m butterfly	James Hickman (United Kingdom) Great Britain	1:55.55	Denys Sylantyev; Ukraine	1:55.76	Scott Goodman; Australia	1:55.94
200 m I.M.	Matthew Dunn; Australia	1:57.46	Christian Keller; Germany	1:58.35	Ron Karnaugh (United States) USA	1:59.12
400 m I.M.	Matthew Dunn; Australia	4:06.89	Xie Xufeng; China	4:12.52	Christian Keller; Germany	4:12.53
4 × 100 m freestyle relay	Germany; Lars Conrad; Christian Tröger; Alexander Lüderitz; Aimo Heilmann	3:14.08	Sweden; Fredrik Letzler; Anders Holmertz; Ola Fagerstrand; Lars Frölander	3:14.22	Australia; Michael Klim; Scott Logan; Richard Upton; Jeffrey English	3:14.83
4 × 200 m freestyle relay	Australia; Michael Klim; Grant Hackett; William Kirby; Matthew Dunn	7:02.74; WR	Sweden; Anders Lyrbring; Anders Holmertz; Lars Frölander; Fredrik Letzler	7:05.61	(United Kingdom) Great Britain; Paul Palmer; Andrew Clayton; Mark Stevens; James Salter	7:05.81
4 × 100 m medley relay	Australia; Adrian Radley; Phil Rogers; Geoff Huegill; Michael Klim	3:30.66; WR	Russia; Vladimir Selkov; Stanislav Lopukhov; Denis Pankratov; Roman Yegorov	3:32.56; ER	(United Kingdom) Great Britain; Martin Harris; Richard Maden; James Hickman; Mark Foster	3:32.61

=== Women ===
Event	Gold		Silver		Bronze	
50 m freestyle	Sandra Völker; Germany	24.70; ER	Jenny Thompson (United States) USA	24.78	Le Jingyi; China	24.83
100 m freestyle	Jenny Thompson (United States) USA	53.46	Sandra Völker; Germany	53.50	Le Jingyi; China	53.72
200 m freestyle	Claudia Poll; Costa Rica	1:54.17; WR	Nian Yun; China	1:56.24	Martina Moravcová; Slovakia	1:56.66
400 m freestyle	Claudia Poll; Costa Rica	4:00.03; WR	Natasha Bowron; Australia	4:05.76	Kerstin Kielgass; Germany	4:07.13
800 m freestyle	Natasha Bowron; Australia	8:26.45	Kerstin Kielgass; Germany	8:28.10	Carla Geurts; Netherlands	8:28.96
100 m backstroke	Lu Donghua; China	59.75	Chen Yan; China	1:00.14	Misty Hyman (United States) USA	1:00.17
200 m backstroke	Chen Yan; China	2:07.50	Misty Hyman (United States) USA	2:07.66	Lia Oberstar (United States) USA	2:08.29
100 m breaststroke	Kristy Ellem; Australia	1:08.27	Alicja Pęczak; Poland	1:08.33	Svitlana Bondarenko; Ukraine	1:08.39
200 m breaststroke	Kristy Ellem; Australia	2:22.68	Larisa Lăcustă; Romania	2:25.60; NR	Alicja Pęczak; Poland	2:25.62
100 m butterfly	Jenny Thompson (United States) USA	57.79; WR	Cai Huijue; China	57.92	Misty Hyman (United States) USA	57.95
200 m butterfly	Liu Limin; China	2:07.20	Hitomi Kashima; Japan	2:07.34	Misty Hyman (United States) USA	2:07.54
200 m I.M.	Louise Karlsson; Sweden	2:11.19	Martina Moravcová; Slovakia	2:11.39	Sue Rolph (United Kingdom) Great Britain	2:12.39
400 m I.M.	Emma Johnson; Australia	4:35.18	Sabine Herbst; Germany	4:36.02	Joanne Malar; Canada	4:37.46
4 × 100 m freestyle relay	China; Le Jingyi; Chao Na; Shan Ying; Nian Yun	3:34.55; WR	Germany; Simone Osygus; Antje Buschschulte; Katrin Meissner; Sandra Völker	3:34.69; ER	Sweden; Johanna Sjöberg; Louise Karlsson; Malin Svahnström; Therese Alshammar	3:38.07
4 × 200 m freestyle relay	China; Wang Luna; Nian Yun; Chen Yan; Shan Ying	7:51.92; WR	Sweden; Johanna Sjöberg; Josefin Lillhage; Louise Jöhncke; Malin Nilsson	7:56.04	Australia; Julia Greville; Natasha Bowron; Lise Mackie; Emma Johnson	7:56.12
4 × 100 m medley relay	China; Lu Donghua; Han Xue; Cai Huijue; Le Jingyi	3:57.83	(United States) USA; Lia Oberstar; Amanda Beard; Misty Hyman; Jenny Thompson	3:58.94	Australia; Meredith Smith; Kristy Ellem; Angela Kennedy; Sarah Ryan	4:01.55

== Medal table ==
Rank	Nation	Gold	Silver	Bronze	Total
1	Australia (AUS)	9	2	8	19
2	China (CHN)	6	5	2	13
3	Sweden (SWE)	3	3	1	7
4	Germany (GER)	2	6	5	13
5	United States (USA)	2	5	5	12
6	Costa Rica (CRC)	2	0	0	2
6	Cuba (CUB)	2	0	0	2
6	Venezuela (VEN)	2	0	0	2
9	Great Britain (GBR)	1	1	4	6
10	Brazil (BRA)	1	1	0	2
11	Belarus (BLR)	1	0	0	1
11	Denmark (DEN)	1	0	0	1
13	Russia (RUS)	0	3	1	4
14	Poland (POL)	0	1	1	2
14	Slovakia (SVK)	0	1	1	2
14	Ukraine (UKR)	0	1	1	2
17	Japan (JPN)	0	1	0	1
17	New Zealand (NZL)	0	1	0	1
17	Romania (ROM)	0	1	0	1
20	Canada (CAN)	0	0	1	1
20	Netherlands (NED)	0	0	1	1
20	Puerto Rico (PUR)	0	0	1	1
Totals (22 entries)		32	32	32	96
