= Eithan Urbach =

Israeli swimmer (born 1977)

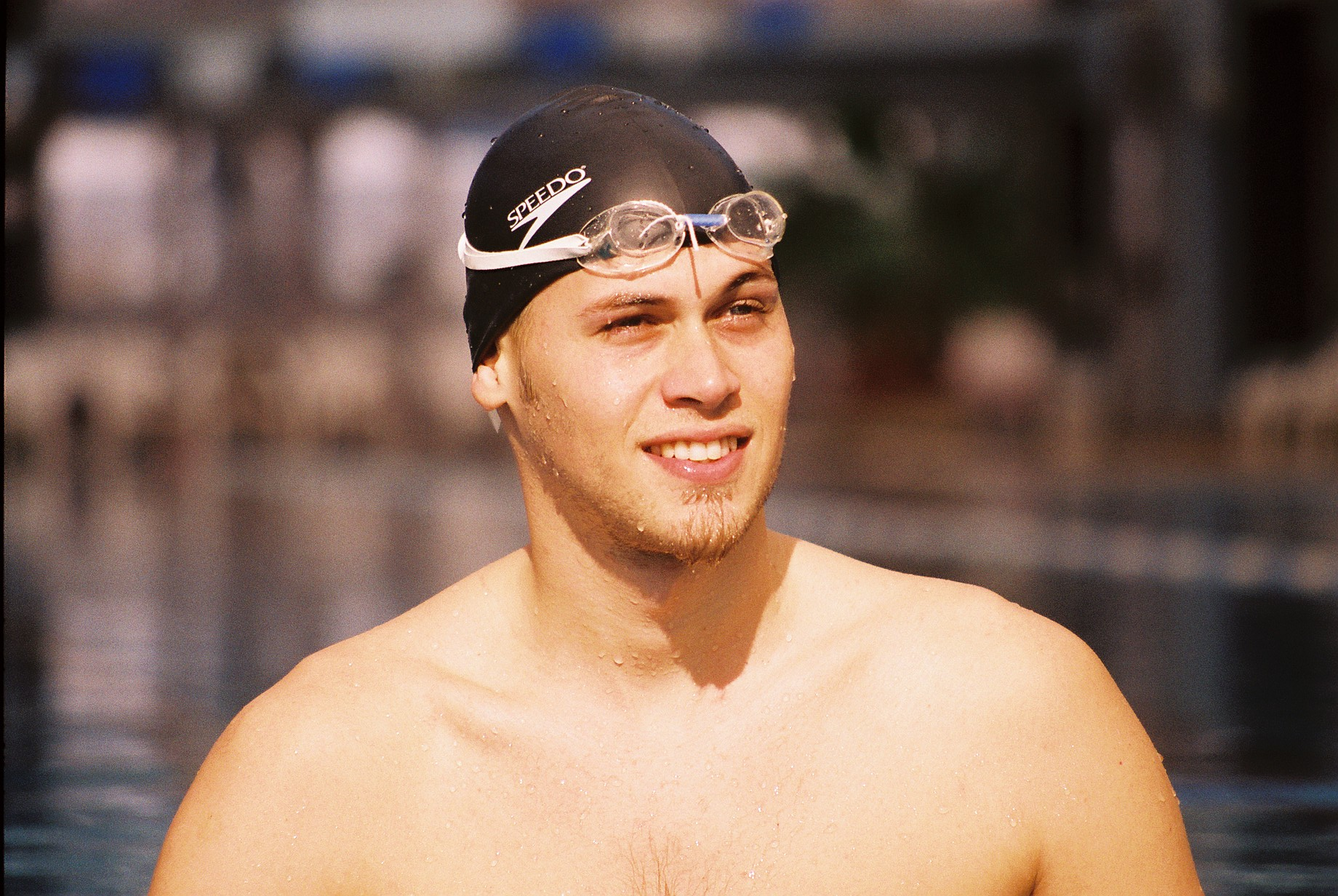

Personal information
- Native name: איתן אורבך
- Full name: Eithan Urbach
- Nationality: Israel
- Born: 12 January 1977 (age 49) Haifa, Israel
- Height: 185 cm (6 ft 1 in)
- Weight: 75 kg (165 lb)

Sport
- Sport: Swimming
- Strokes: backstroke, 50m, 100m, 200m
- Club: Maccabi Haifa
- College team: Auburn University
- Coach: David Marsh (Auburn)
Medal record
Men's swimming
Representing Israel
European LC Championships
Silver medal – second place	1997 Seville	100 m backstroke
Bronze medal – third place	1999 Istanbul	100 m backstroke
European Championships (SC)
Bronze medal – third place	1998 Sheffield	100 m backstroke

Eithan Urbach (Hebrew: איתן אורבך; born 12 January 1977 in Haifa) is a former backstroke swimmer from Israel who swam for Auburn University. Swimming for Israel, Urbach competed in the 1996 Summer Olympics in Atlanta and the 2000 Summer Olympics in Sydney. In the 1996 Atlanta Olympics, Urbach's 4x100 Israeli medley relay team, with Urbach swimming the backstroke leg, set an Israeli National Record in a preliminary heat, becoming the first Israeli swimming team to make the finals of this Olympic event. In 1997, Urbach shared Israel's Sportsman of the Year award.

== College swimming ==
While at Auburn, Urbach swam under accomplished head swim coach David Marsh. Under Marsh's direction, Auburn won the NCAA Swimming championships in 1997 and 1999, while Urbach was swimming for the team. Marsh would also serve as a professional adviser to the Israeli Swimming Association.

=== 1997 SEC Championships ===
At the Southeastern Conference (SEC) Swimming Championships on February 22, 1997, Urbach placed 5th in the 200 backstroke with a time of 1:45:74. Auburn won the SEC Championships that year, and began a long streak of successive SEC championships through the 2011-2012 season.

=== 1997 NCAA Championships ===
At the March, 1997 NCAA Swimming Championships at the Aquatic Center at the University of Minnesota, Urbach placed eighth in the 200 backstroke with a time of 1:45:76. Urbach's time was only around 4.66 seconds behind American Lenny Krayzelburg's first place time in the NCAA event that year. The Auburn men's team won the NCAA Swimming Championships that year, and finished the 1997 regular season by March undefeated.

== 1996 Summer olympics ==
=== Israeli 100m backstroke record ===
Urbach swam in two events in the 1996 Summer Olympics in Atlanta.

On July 23, 1996, swimming for Israel, Urbach competed in his signature event, the 100 m backstroke, placing 22nd. Though his finish was not near medal contention, at only 19 Ethan notably set an Israeli record of 56.74, three seconds behind the world record held by America's Jeff Rouse at 53.66. The win gave Urbach national prominence in the stroke.

=== Israeli 4 x 100 medley relay record ===
In their eighth place 4x100 medley relay at the 1996 Olympics, Urbach swam backstroke for the Israeli team, which finished with a time in the finals of 3:42:90. Yoav Bruck, another Auburn swimmer and a highly accomplished Israeli freestyler swam the final freestyle leg. In one of his most significant accomplishments as a swimmer, Urbach helped the Israeli team set a national record in the medley relay preliminaries, which was slightly faster than their final's time, and Urbach's 1996 Israeli Olympic swim team became the first to reach a swimming final. An enthusiastic American crowd and large global television audience watched the finish.

== 2000 Summer olympics ==
Swimming for Israel in the 2000 Olympics at the Sydney International Aquatic Center, he competed in the 4x100m freestyle relay, placing 14th with a team time of 3:22.06.

In the 100m backstroke, one of Urbach's strongest events and his best showing at the 2000 Olympics, Urbach placed 8th with a time of 55.74, breaking his prior personal record, and just two seconds behind the Gold Medal time of American Lenny Krazelberg, another Jewish athlete who excelled in backstroke. Urbach's time was only around 1 second behind the bronze medal winner's time, but there was a very close finish, placing him out of medal contention.

With Urbach competing with the Israeli team in the 4x100m medley relay swimming backstroke, the team placed 17th with a combined time of 32:43.39.

== International competition ==
=== European championships medals, '97-99 ===
In the European Championships in Seville, Spain, he medaled in August 1997, with a silver in the 100m backstroke with a time of 55.88.

In the 1998 European Championships in the short course, at Sheffield, England he received a bronze medal in the 100 meter backstroke with a time of 53.64.

In July 1999 at the European Championships, he obtained a bronze medal in the 100m backstroke in Istanbul, Turkey with a time of 55.87.

=== World Cup Bronze medals, 1996, 2002 ===
In the FINA Swimming World Cup in November 1996, in Germany, he received a Bronze medal in the 200m backstroke with a time of 1:57:52.

At the age of 25, in the FINA Swimming World Cup in January 2002, he won a Bronze medal in France in the 50m backstroke with a time of 25:02, and a Bronze medal in the 100 meter backstroke with a time of 53:24.

Finishing out of medal contention in the 100 meter backstroke in January 1998 at the World Championships in Perth, Australia, Urbach finished 7th, with a time of 55.97.

Finishing just out of medal contention, in the European Championships in Helsinki in July 2000, he placed fourth in the 100m backstroke finals with a time of 55.94.

== See also ==
- List of select Jewish swimmers
