= Adam Ruckwood =

British swimmer

Personal information
- Nationality: English
- Born: 13 September 1974 (age 52) Birmingham, West Midlands, England

Sport
- Sport: Swimming
- Club: City of Birmingham Swimming Club
Medal record
Swimming
Representing Great Britain
European Championships (LC)
Bronze medal – third place	1995 Vienna	200 m backstroke
European Championships (SC)
Silver medal – second place	1998 Sheffield	200 m backstroke
Bronze medal – third place	1999 Lisbon	200 m backstroke
Representing England
Commonwealth Games
Gold medal – first place	1994 Victoria	200 m backstroke
Bronze medal – third place	1994 Victoria	100 m backstroke
Silver medal – second place	2002 Manchester	4×100 m medley

Adam Ruckwood (born 13 September 1974) is a male English former competitive swimmer and backstroke specialist.

== Swimming career ==
Ruckwood represented Great Britain at three consecutive Summer Olympics, starting in 1992 (Barcelona, Spain). At the ASA National British Championships he won the 100 metres backstroke title three times (1998, 2000, 2001) and the 200 metres backstroke title seven times (1993, 1994, 1995, 1997, 1998, 1999, 2000).

Ruckwood also competed in three Commonwealth Games; he represented England where he won a gold and silver medals in the backstroke events, at the 1994 Commonwealth Games in Victoria, British Columbia, Canada. Four years later he represented England again, at the 1998 Commonwealth Games in Kuala Lumpur and in 2002 he competed in his third Games.

== Coaching career ==
He was formerly head coach at City of Birmingham Swimming Club, then moved to city of Coventry swimming club as head coach.

== See also ==
- List of Commonwealth Games medallists in swimming (men)
