= Miroslav Machovič =

Slovak swimmer (born 1976)

Personal information
- Full name: Miroslav Machovič
- National team: Slovakia
- Born: 21 March 1976 (age 50) Trnava, Czechoslovakia
- Height: 1.84 m (6 ft 0 in)
- Weight: 80 kg (176 lb)

Sport
- Sport: Swimming
- Strokes: Backstroke
- Club: STU Trnava
- Coach: Ladislav Hlavatý, Jiřī Walter

Miroslav Machovič (born March 21, 1976) is a Slovak former swimmer, who specialized in backstroke events. He is a two-time Olympian (1996 and 2000), and a former Slovak record holder in 50, 100, and (200 m backstroke-till today). During his sporting career, Machovic also trained for STU Trnava and Dukla Banska Bystrica under his coaches Ladislav Hlavatý, Jiřī Walter .

Machovic's Olympic debut came at the 1996 Summer Olympics in Atlanta. There, he failed to reach the top 16 final in any of his individual events, finishing thirty-third in the 100 m backstroke (57.78), and nineteenth in the 200 m backstroke (2:04.15).

At the 2000 Summer Olympics in Sydney, Machovic competed again in a backstroke double. He posted FINA B-standards of 56.63 (100 m backstroke) and 2:01.72 (200 m backstroke) from the European Championships in Helsinki, Finland. On the second day of the Games, Machovic placed twenty-eighth in the 100 m backstroke. Swimming in heat four, he shared a fourth seed with Portugal's Nuno Laurentino in a matching time of 56.95. Three days later, in the 200 m backstroke, Machovic challenged seven other swimmers in heat three, including Austria's 18-year-old Markus Rogan, who later earned a silver in Athens four years later. He came up short in sixth place and thirty-first overall at 2:04.73, exactly three seconds off his Slovak record and entry time.
