= Sergey Ostapchuk =

Russian swimmer

Personal information
- Born: 10 February 1976 (age 50) Kishinev, USSR
- Height: 1.90 m (6 ft 3 in)
- Weight: 79 kg (174 lb)

Sport
- Sport: Swimming
- Club: Volga Volgograd
Medal record
Men's swimming
Representing Russia
World Championships (SC)
| Bronze medal – third place | 1999 Hong Kong | 200 m backstroke |
European Championships (LC)
| Bronze medal – third place | 1999 Istanbul | 4×100 m medley |

Sergey Ostapchuk (Russian: Серге́й Остапчук; born 10 February 1976) is a retired Russian swimmer who won two bronze medals at the World and European championships in 1999. He also competed in the 100 m and 200 m backstroke events at the 1996 and 2000 Summer Olympics but did not reach the finals.

He has retired from senior swimming, but is still competing in the masters category. He lives in Vladivostok.
