= Neisser Bent =

Cuban swimmer (born 1976)

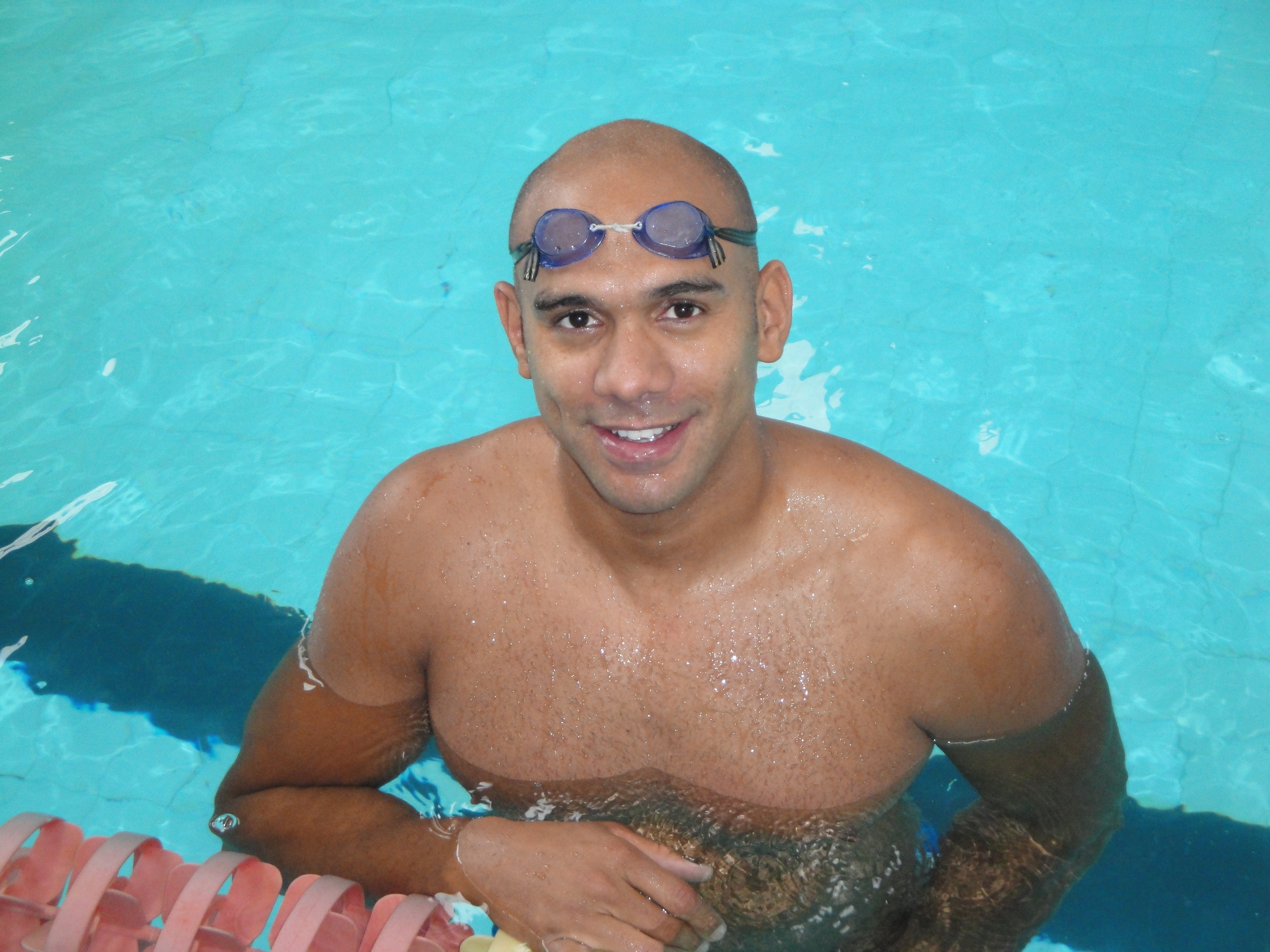

Personal information
- Full name: Neisser S. Bent Vázquez
- Nationality: Cuba
- Born: 7 August 1976 (age 50) Ciudad de la Habana
- Height: 1.92 m (6 ft 4 in)
- Weight: 88 kg (194 lb)

Sport
- Sport: Swimming
- Strokes: Backstroke
Medal record
Men's swimming
Representing Cuba
Olympic Games
Bronze medal – third place	1996 Atlanta	100 m backstroke
World Championships (SC)
Gold medal – first place	1997 Gothenburg	100 m backstroke
Gold medal – first place	1997 Gothenburg	200 m backstroke
Universiade
Gold medal – first place	1997 Catania	100 m backstroke
Silver medal – second place	1997 Catania	200 m backstroke

Neisser S. Bent Vázquez (born 7 August 1976 in Nueva Gerona, Isla de la Juventud) is a former international backstroke swimmer from Cuba, who swam at the 1996 and 2000 Olympics. At the '96 Games, he won the bronze medal in the 100 m backstroke, just behind fellow countryman Rodolfo Falcón. These are the only Olympic medals that Cuba has ever won in swimming.

At the 1998 Central American and Caribbean Games, he broke the Championship Record in the 200 backstroke (2:01.53). This record stood until the 2006 Games where it was bettered by Barbados' Nick Neckles.
