= Vladimir Selkov =

Russian swimmer

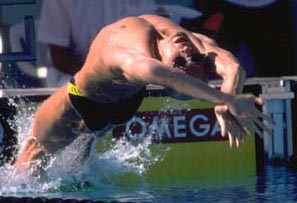

Personal information
- Nationality: Russia
- Born: 1 April 1971 (age 55) Berezniki, Soviet Union (nowr Russia)
- Height: 1.88 m (6 ft 2 in)
- Weight: 75 kg (165 lb)

Sport
- Sport: Swimming
- Strokes: Backstroke
- Club: Central Sport Club of the Army (CSKA), Volgograd
- Coach: Viktor Avdienko
Medal record
Men's swimming
Representing the Unified Team
Olympic Games
Silver medal – second place	1992 Barcelona	200 m backstroke
Silver medal – second place	1992 Barcelona	4×100 m medley
Representing Russia
Silver medal – second place	1996 Atlanta	4×100 m medley
World Championships (LC)
Gold medal – first place	1994 Rome	200 m backstroke
Silver medal – second place	1994 Rome	4×100 m medley
Bronze medal – third place	1991 Perth	200 m backstroke
World Championships (SC)
Silver medal – second place	1997 Gothenburg	4×100 m medley
Bronze medal – third place	1997 Gothenburg	200 m backstroke
European Championships (LC)
Gold medal – first place	1991 Athens	4×100 m medley
Gold medal – first place	1993 Sheffield	200 m backstroke
Gold medal – first place	1993 Sheffield	4×100 m medley
Gold medal – first place	1995 Vienna	100 m backstroke
Gold medal – first place	1995 Vienna	200 m backstroke
Gold medal – first place	1995 Vienna	4×100 m medley
Gold medal – first place	1997 Seville	200 m backstroke
Gold medal – first place	1997 Seville	4×100 m medley
Silver medal – second place	1989 Bonn	200 m backstroke
Silver medal – second place	1991 Athens	200 m backstroke
Silver medal – second place	1993 Sheffield	100 m backstroke
Bronze medal – third place	1997 Seville	100 m backstroke
European Championships (SC)
Silver medal – second place	1991 Gelsenkirchen	50 m backstroke

Vladimir Vladimirovich Selkov (Russian: Владимир Владимирович Сельков; born 1 April 1971 in Berezniki) is a former backstroke swimmer from Russia, who won a total number of three silver medals at the Summer Olympics. His only individual medal came at his debut, at the Barcelona Games in 1992, in the 200 m backstroke.
