= Stev Theloke =

German swimmer

Personal information
- Full name: Stev Theloke
- Nationality: Germany
- Born: 18 January 1978 (age 48) Karl-Marx-Stadt, East Germany
- Height: 2.02 m (6 ft 8 in)
- Weight: 100 kg (220 lb)

Sport
- Sport: Swimming
- Strokes: Backstroke
- Club: Sportclub Chemnitz von 1892
Medal record
Men's swimming
Representing Germany
Event	1st	2nd	3rd
Olympic Games	0	0	2
World Championships (LC)	0	0	1
European Championships (LC)	5	2	2
European Championships (SC)	5	5	2
Total	10	7	7
Olympic Games
Bronze medal – third place	2000 Sydney	100 m backstroke
Bronze medal – third place	2000 Sydney	4×100 m medley
World Championships (LC)
Bronze medal – third place	1998 Perth	100 m backstroke
European Championships (LC)
Gold medal – first place	1999 Istanbul	50 m backstroke
Gold medal – first place	1999 Istanbul	100 m backstroke
Gold medal – first place	2000 Helsinki	50 m backstroke
Gold medal – first place	2002 Berlin	100 m backstroke
Gold medal – first place	2004 Madrid	50 m backstroke
Silver medal – second place	1999 Istanbul	4×100 m medley
Silver medal – second place	2002 Berlin	50 m backstroke
Bronze medal – third place	2002 Berlin	4×100 m medley
Bronze medal – third place	2004 Madrid	100 m backstroke
European Championships (SC)
Gold medal – first place	1996 Rostock	4×50 m medley
Gold medal – first place	1998 Sheffield	100 m backstroke
Gold medal – first place	2001 Antwerp	50 m backstroke
Gold medal – first place	2001 Antwerp	4×50 m medley
Gold medal – first place	2002 Riesa	4×50 m medley
Silver medal – second place	1996 Rostock	100 m backstroke
Silver medal – second place	1998 Sheffield	50 m backstroke
Silver medal – second place	2001 Antwerp	100 m backstroke
Silver medal – second place	2002 Riesa	50 m backstroke
Silver medal – second place	2002 Riesa	100 m backstroke
Bronze medal – third place	1996 Rostock	50 m backstroke
Bronze medal – third place	1996 Rostock	200 m backstroke

Stev Theloke (born 18 January 1978, in Karl-Marx-Stadt) is a professional swimmer from Germany, who won two bronze medals at the 2000 Summer Olympics. He did so in the 4×100 metres medley relay and in the 100 metres backstroke.

Theloke missed the 2004 Summer Olympics due to injury, and he was expelled from the German team for the 2005 World Aquatics Championships after he criticised his own swimming federation in an interview.
