= Mariusz Siembida =

Polish swimmer

Personal information
- Full name: Mariusz Siembida
- Nationality: Poland
- Born: 21 March 1975 (age 51) Puławy, Lubelskie
- Height: 1.88 m (6 ft 2 in)

Sport
- Sport: Swimming
- Strokes: backstroke
- Club: KS Lublinianka
Medal record
Men's swimming
Representing Poland
World Championships (SC)
Silver medal – second place	1999 Hong Kong	50 m backstroke
Bronze medal – third place	1999 Hong Kong	100 m backstroke
European Championships (LC)
Bronze medal – third place	1997 Seville	4×100 m medley
Bronze medal – third place	1999 Istanbul	50 m backstroke
European Championships (SC)
Gold medal – first place	1996 Rostock	50 m backstroke
Gold medal – first place	1996 Rostock	100 m backstroke
Summer Universiade
Gold medal – first place	2001 Beijing	50 m backstroke
Bronze medal – third place	1997 Catania	100 m backstroke

Mariusz Siembida (born 21 March 1975 in Puławy, Lubelskie) is a retired backstroke swimmer from Poland, who competed for his native country at two consecutive Summer Olympics, starting in 1996 (Atlanta, Georgia).

A member of Lublinianka he is best known for winning the bronze medal at the 1997 European Swimming Championships in the men's 4×100 m medley relay, alongside Marek Krawczyk, Marcin Kaczmarek and Bartosz Kizierowski.
