= Emanuele Merisi =

Italian swimmer (born 1972)

Personal information
- Born: 10 October 1972 (age 53)
Medal record
Men's swimming
Representing Italy
Olympic Games
Bronze medal – third place	1996 Atlanta	200 m backstroke
European Championships (LC)
Silver medal – second place	1997 Seville	200 m backstroke
Silver medal – second place	2000 Helsinki	200 m backstroke
Bronze medal – third place	1993 Sheffield	200 m backstroke
Bronze medal – third place	1995 Vienna	4×200 m freestyle
Bronze medal – third place	1999 Istanbul	200 m backstroke
European Championships (SC)
Gold medal – first place	1996 Rostock	200 m backstroke
Silver medal – second place	1996 Rostock	4x50 m medley
Bronze medal – third place	1996 Rostock	100 m backstroke
Summer Universiade
Gold medal – first place	1997 Messina	200 m backstroke
Silver medal – second place	1993 Buffalo	200 m backstroke
Bronze medal – third place	1993 Buffalo	100 m backstroke
Mediterranean Games
Gold medal – first place	1997 Bari	100 m backstroke
Gold medal – first place	1997 Bari	200 m backstroke
Gold medal – first place	1997 Bari	4×100 m medley

Emanuele Merisi (born 10 October 1972) is an Italian former professional swimmer, specialized in backstroke, who won a bronze medal in the 1996 Summer Olympics.

== Career ==
Merisi was born in Treviglio, province of Bergamo (Lombardy).

He began to swim at the age of 8, becoming a member of the Italian national team in 1989. His first important medal was at the European LC Championships 1993 in Sheffield, where he won a bronze medal in his favourite race, the 200 m backstroke. He repeated the result in the European LC Championships 1995, this time as a member of the 4×200 m freestyle relay.

Merisi presented at the 1996 Summer Olympics with the best time of the year in the 200 m backstroke, 1:57.70. This is still today the Italian record. In the race, however, he was not able to repeat this outstanding result: he gained only a bronze medal after Americans Brad Bridgewater and Tripp Schwenk, both with times largely superior to that time.

As captain of Italian team in his last years, Merisi took part in two further editions of the Summer Olympics. In 2000, he was ranked again amongst the favourites in 200m backstroke and finished in 5th place. His results include two more silver medal (in 1997 and 2000) and a bronze medal (1999) at the European Championships, all in the 200 m backstroke.

== Personal bests ==
- 100 m backstroke: 55.53
- 200 m backstroke: 1:57.70
