= Darius Grigalionis =

Lithuanian swimmer (born 1977)

Personal information
- Full name: Darius Grigalionis
- Nationality: Lithuania
- Born: 21 April 1977 (age 49) Panevėžys, Lithuanian SSR, Soviet Union

Sport
- Sport: Swimming
- Strokes: backstroke
Medal record
Men's swimming
Representing Lithuania
European Championships (LC)
Silver medal – second place	2000 Helsinki	50 m backstroke
Silver medal – second place	2004 Madrid	50 m backstroke
European Championships (SC)
Silver medal – second place	1998 Sheffield	100 m backstroke
Bronze medal – third place	2000 Valencia	50 m backstroke
Bronze medal – third place	2002 Riesa	50 m backstroke

Darius Grigalionis (born April 21, 1977 in Panevėžys) is a backstroke swimmer from Lithuania, who competed in three consecutive Summer Olympics for his native country, starting in 1996. He was born in the city of Panevėžys. A student of the Kaunas University of Technology, he had been a scholarship holder with the Olympic Solidarity Program since August 2002.
