= Nuno Laurentino =

Portuguese swimmer

Personal information
- Full name: Nuno Filipe Gomes Laurentino
- National team: Portugal
- Born: 3 August 1975 (age 50) Lisbon, Portugal
- Height: 1.93 m (6 ft 4 in)
- Weight: 75 kg (165 lb)

Sport
- Sport: Swimming
- Strokes: Backstroke, freestyle, medley
- Club: Sport Algés e Dafundo
- College team: University of Florida

Nuno Filipe Gomes Laurentino (born 3 August 1975) is a Portuguese former competition swimmer who represented Portugal at the 1996 Summer Olympics in Atlanta and the 2000 Summer Olympics in Sydney.

Laurentino was born in Lisbon. He attended the University of Florida in Gainesville, Florida, where he swam for the Florida Gators swimming and diving team in National Collegiate Athletic Association (NCAA) competition in 1997.

Considered by many the most eclectic Portuguese swimmer of all time, at one point he held fifty percent of all Portuguese national swimming records. He was the first Portuguese swimmer to break the fifty-second mark in the 100-meter freestyle short course and the first Iberian swimmer to break the fifty-second mark in the 100-meter freestyle long course. He retired from competitive swimming in 2007.

== See also ==
- List of University of Florida alumni
- List of University of Florida Olympians
