= Swimming at the 2003 World Aquatics Championships – Men's 100 metre backstroke =

Men's 100m Backstroke at the 2003 FINA World Aquatics Championships
- Dates: 21 July (prelims, semifinals); 22 July (final)
- Winning time: 53.61 seconds

Medalists
gold medal	Aaron Peirsol	United States
silver medal	Arkady Vyatchanin	Russia
silver medal	Matt Welsh	Australia

The Men's 100 Backstroke event at the 10th FINA World Aquatics Championships swam 21 – 22 July 2003 in Barcelona, Spain. Preliminary and Semifinal heats swam on July 21; the Final was held on July 22.

At the start of the event, the existing World (WR) and Championship (CR) records were:

- WR: 53.60 swum by Lenny Krayzelburg (USA) on August 24, 1999 in Sydney, Australia
- CR: 54.31 swum by Matt Welsh (Australia) on July 23, 2001 in Fukuoka, Japan

== Results ==
=== Final ===
Place	Swimmer	Nation	Time	Notes
1	Aaron Peirsol	USA	53.61	CR
2	Arkady Vyatchanin	Russia	53.92	
2	Matt Welsh	Australia	53.92	
4	Steffen Driesen	Germany	54.17	
5	Markus Rogan	Austria	54.53	
6	Tomomi Morita	Japan	54.86	
7	László Cseh	Hungary	54.95	
8	Alex Lim	Malaysia	55.18	

=== Semifinals ===
Rank	Heat + Lane	Swimmer	Nation	Time	Notes
1	S2 L5	Aaron Peirsol	USA	54.28	q, CR
2	S1 L4	Arkady Vyatchanin	Russia	54.49	q
3	S1 L1	Steffen Driesen	Germany	54.60	q
4	S2 L4	Matt Welsh	Australia	54.77	q
4	S2 L8	Alex Lim	Malaysia	54.77	q
6	S2 L2	Markus Rogan	Austria	55.11	q
7	S2 L3	László Cseh	Hungary	55.12	q
8	S1 L5	Tomomi Morita	Japan	55.17	q
9	S2 L6	Ouyang Kunpeng	China	55.21	
10	S1 L3	Blaž Medvešek	Slovenia	55.30	
11	S1 L7	Simon Dufour	France	55.31	
12	S1 L8	Atsushi Nishikori	Japan	55.36	
13	S2 L1	Răzvan Florea	Romania	55.42	
14	S1 L2	Örn Arnarson	Iceland	55.67	
15	S1 L6	Yoav Gath	Israel	55.71	
16	S2 L7	Péter Horváth	Hungary	55.83	

=== Preliminaries ===
Rank	Heat+Lane	Swimmer	Nation	Time	Notes
1	H12 L4	Matt Welsh	Australia	54.79	q
2	H10 L2	Arkady Vyatchanin	Russia	54.81	q
3	H11 L4	Aaron Peirsol	United States	54.99	q
4	H12 L6	Tomoni Morita	Japan	55.06	q
5	H11 L7	László Cseh	Hungary	55.11	q
6	H10 L8	Blaž Medvešek	Slovenia	55.28	q
7	H11 L1	Ouyang Kunpeng	China	55.29	q
8	H08 L4	Yoav Gath	Israel	55.41	q
9	H11 L5	Markus Rogan	Austria	55.42	q
10	H09 L8	Örn Arnarson	Iceland	55.47	q
10	H10 L3	Péter Horváth	Hungary	55.47	q
12	H11 L2	Simon Dufour	France	55.49	q
13	H09 L1	Răzvan Florea	Romania	55.56	q
13	H10 L5	Steffen Driesen	Germany	55.56	q
15	H11 L6	Alex Lim	Malaysia	55.62	q
16	H12 L5	Atsushi Nishikori	Japan	55.67	q
17	H10 L7	Riley Janes	Canada	55.76	
18	H12 L8	Gerhard Zandberg	South Africa	55.80	
19	H12 L3	Josh Watson	Australia	55.81	
20	H09 L5	Karel Novy	Switzerland	55.82	
21	H12 L1	David Ortega	Spain	55.85	
22	H12 L7	Toni Helbig	Germany	55.90	
23	H10 L6	Gordan Kožulj	Croatia	55.94	
24	H09 L4	Ahmed Hussein	Egypt	55.95	
25	H08 L2	Darius Grigalionis	Lithuania	56.00	
26	H08 L7	Ryan Pini	Papua New Guinea	56.06	
27	H10 L1	Volodymyr Nikolaychuk	Ukraine	56.14	
28	H09 L7	Cameron Gibson	New Zealand	56.22	
29	H12 L2	Evgueni Alechine	Russia	56.31	
30	H11 L3	Pierre Roger	France	56.34	
31	H11 L8	Min Sung	South Korea	56.38	
32	H07 L6	Pavel Suškov	Lithuania	56.42	
33	H09 L2	Jorge Sánchez	Spain	56.44	
34	H08 L6	Klaas Erik Zwering	Netherlands	56.58	
35	H07 L4	Pavlo Illichov	Ukraine	56.60	
36	H09 L3	Rui Yu	China	56.77	
37	H09 L6	Paulo Machado	Brazil	57.01	
38	H08 L3	Nuno Laurentino	Portugal	57.10	
39	H08 L1	Flori Lang	Switzerland	57.12	
40	H07 L7	Jens Petersson	Sweden	57.36	
41	H07 L5	Keith Beavers	Canada	57.54	
42	H07 L1	Martin Viilep	Estonia	57.69	
42	H08 L5	Sander Ganzevles	Netherlands	57.69	
44	H01 L6	Mattias Ohlin	Sweden	57.75	
45	H08 L8	Gabriel Mangabeira	Brazil	58.08	
46	H07 L3	Alexandr Ivlev	Moldova	58.53	
47	H07 L2	Andrei Mihailov	Moldova	58.67	
48	H07 L8	Nicholas Bovell	Trinidad and Tobago	59.42	
49	H06 L4	Mauricio Prudencio	Bolivia	59.62	
50	H06 L8	Jared Heine	Marshall Islands	1:00.13	
51	H06 L3	Ashby Brendan	Zimbabwe	1:00.21	
52	H06 L7	Yau Sun Fai	Hong Kong	1:00.87	
53	H06 L2	Guillermo Andres Ramirez Lemis	Colombia	1:01.38	
54	H06 L1	Gustavo Vera	Paraguay	1:01.44	
55	H05 L4	Long Do Huy	Vietnam	1:02.06	
56	H06 L5	Mikhail Alekseyev	Uzbekistan	1:02.38	
57	H05 L1	Roberto Sanso	Costa Rica	1:02.40	
58	H04 L3	Khaly Ciss	Senegal	1:02.49	
59	H05 L5	Danil Bugakov	Uzbekistan	1:02.67	
60	H05 L7	Mohammad Nazeri	Iran	1:02.75	
61	H06 L6	Yury Zaharov	Kyrgyzstan	1:02.91	
62	H04 L4	James Walsh	Philippines	1:03.72	
63	H05 L3	Abed Rahman Kaaki	Lebanon	1:03.77	
64	H05 L6	Oleg Deikrishvili	Georgia	1:03.84	
65	H04 L5	Chi Lon Lei	Macau	1:03.86	
66	H03 L5	Onan Thom	Guyana	1:03.91	
67	H04 L6	Ammar Musaed Al Tamimi	United Arab Emirates	1:04.31	
68	H04 L2	Omar Abu Faris	Jordan	1:04.45	
69	H03 L6	Seung Gin Lee	Northern Mariana Islands	1:04.80	
70	H05 L2	Olufolahan Oluwole	Nigeria	1:05.35	
71	H04 L8	Kabir Walia	Kenya	1:05.50	
72	H04 L1	Rubel Mohammad Rubel Rana	Bangladesh	1:05.62	
73	H05 L8	Rony Bakale	Republic of the Congo	1:05.82	
74	H03 L2	Nuno Rola	Angola	1:06.49	
75	H02 L5	Patrick Boustany	Lebanon	1:07.14	
76	H03 L3	Daniel Kang	Guam	1:07.92	
77	H03 L4	Urnultsaikhan Ganbold	Mongolia	1:08.19	
78	H03 L7	Sean Chow	Fiji	1:09.18	
79	H02 L1	Muzeya Muzyamba	Zambia	1:10.71	
80	H02 L6	Kin-Vincent Duenas	Guam	1:11.15	
81	H01 L4	Peter James Linch	Zambia	1:12.30	
82	H02 L2	Leonel Matonse	Mozambique	1:13.11	
83	H02 L8	Mohammed S. Abbas	Iraq	1:13.75	
84	H03 L8	Hadjamamed Hadjamamedov	Turkmenistan	1:14.23	
-	-	Randall Bal	United States	DQ	
-	-	Landry H. Degnifo Enokorin	Ivory Coast	DNS	
-	-	Gibrilla Kanu	Sierra Leone	DNS	
-	-	Awsan Mohammede Saleh Qardaa	Yemen	DNS	
-	-	Hem Lumphar	Cambodia	DNS	
