= Swimming at the 2004 Summer Olympics – Men's 200 metre backstroke =

Men's 200 metre backstroke at the Games of the XXVIII Olympiad
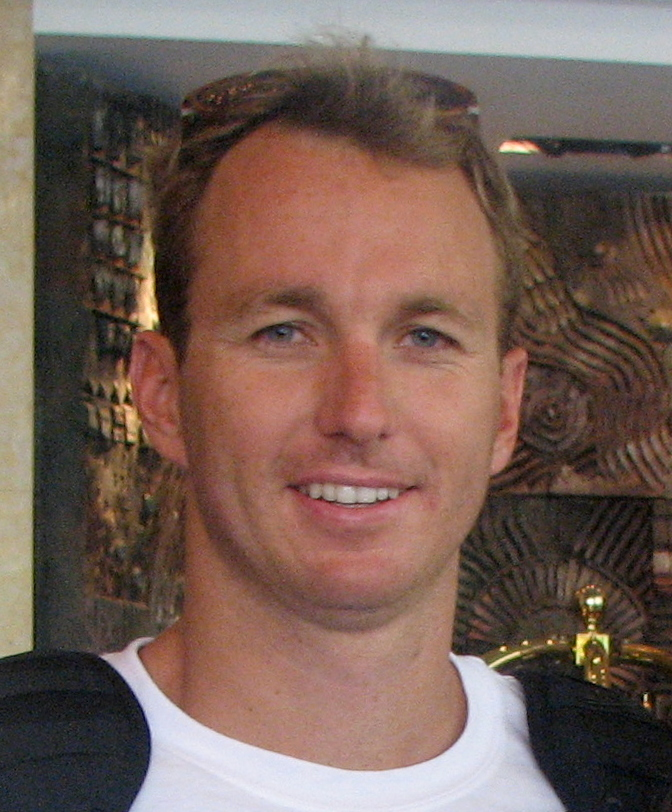
- Gold medalist Aaron Peirsol (2008)
- Venue: Athens Olympic Aquatic Centre
- Dates: August 18, 2004 (heats & semifinals); August 19, 2004 (final)
- Competitors: 36 from 30 nations
- Winning time: 1:54.95 OR

Medalists
1st place, gold medalist(s)		Aaron Peirsol	United States
2nd place, silver medalist(s)		Markus Rogan	Austria
3rd place, bronze medalist(s)		Răzvan Florea	Romania

The men's 200 metre backstroke event at the 2004 Olympic Games was contested at the Olympic Aquatic Centre of the Athens Olympic Sports Complex in Athens, Greece on August 18 and 19. There were 36 competitors from 30 nations. Each nation had been limited to two swimmers in the event since 1984.

U.S. swimmer Aaron Peirsol won a gold medal in this event, with an Olympic record time of 1:54.95. Markus Rogan, silver medalist in the 100 metre backstroke, added another silver for Austria in the same stroke, in an outstanding time of 1:57.35. Romania's Răzvan Florea, who finished behind Rogan by 0.21 of a second, earned a bronze in 1:57.56. Peirsol became the fifth swimmer and fourth American in Olympic history to claim titles in two backstroke events. He was also only the third swimmer to win multiple medals in the men's 200 backstroke (Roland Matthes and Mitch Ivey both did so in 1968 and 1972). It was the third consecutive, and sixth overall, victory for the United States in the event. It was Austria's first medal in the men's 200 metre backstroke since 1900; Romania had never won a medal in the event before.

In the final, Peirsol won the race but was disqualified for a noncontinuous backstroke turn (in backstroke, a swimmer is allowed to rotate onto his/her stomach going into a turn, as long as 1) only one arm pull occurs while the swimmer is on his/her stomach and 2) the turn is one smooth motion). The judge in Peirsol's lane indicated that Peirsol had kicked in to the wall on the third turn. Peirsol's disqualification was appealed, and overturned, reinstating his time and finish. An initial statement from FINA was that the explanation given on the judge's report was "inadequate and not in the working language of FINA." The judge was from France, and the official languages of FINA are French and English. A later statement by FINA executive director Cornel Mărculescu revealed that the judge's report, which had also been signed off on by two other officials including referee Woon Sui Kut, was blank. All three officials were removed from further involvement with the 2004 Olympic swimming competitions. The British team have announced their intention to appeal to a higher body in an attempt to get their fourth-place swimmer James Goddard for a bronze medal.

== Background ==
This was the 12th appearance of the 200 metre backstroke event. It was first held in 1900. The event did not return until 1964; since then, it has been on the programme at every Summer Games. From 1904 to 1960, a men's 100 metre backstroke was held instead. In 1964, only the 200 metres was held. Beginning in 1968 and ever since, both the 100 and 200 metre versions have been held.

Six of the 8 finalists from the 2000 Games returned: silver medalist Aaron Peirsol of the United States, bronze medalist Matt Welsh of Australia, fifth-place finisher (and 1996 bronze medalist) Emanuele Merisi of Italy, sixth-place finisher Răzvan Florea of Romania, seventh-place finisher Rogério Romero of Brazil, and eighth-place finisher Gordan Kožulj of Croatia. Peirsol had won the 2001 and 2003 World Championships, broken the world record in 2002 and again at the 2004 U.S. Olympic trials, and won the 100 metre backstroke earlier in Athens; he was heavily favoured.

Finland made its debut in the event. Australia and Great Britain each made their 11th appearance, tied for most among nations to that point.

== Competition format ==
The competition followed the format established in 2000, with three rounds: heats, semifinals, and a final. The advancement rule followed the format introduced in 1952. A swimmer's place in the heat was not used to determine advancement; instead, the fastest times from across all heats in a round were used. The top 16 swimmers from the heats advanced to the semifinals. The top 8 semifinalists advanced to the final. Swim-offs were used as necessary to break ties.

This swimming event used backstroke. Because an Olympic-size swimming pool is 50 metres long, this race consisted of four lengths of the pool.

== Records ==
Prior to this competition, the existing world and Olympic records were as follows:

World record	Aaron Peirsol (USA)	1:54.74	Long Beach, United States	12 July 2004
Olympic record	Lenny Krayzelburg (USA)	1:56.76	Sydney, Australia	21 September 2000

The following records were established during the competition:

Date	Event	Swimmer	Nation	Time	Record
18 August	Semifinal	Aaron Peirsol	United States	1:55.14	OR
19 August	Final	Aaron Peirsol	United States	1:54.95	OR

== Schedule ==
All times are Greece Standard Time (UTC+2)

Date	Time	Round
Wednesday, 18 August 2004	10:23; 19:50	Heats; Semifinals
Thursday, 19 August 2004	19:49	Final

== Results ==
=== Heats ===
Rank	Heat	Lane	Swimmer	Nation	Time	Notes
1	5	4	Aaron Peirsol	United States	1:57.33	Q
2	4	5	James Goddard	Great Britain	1:57.96	Q
3	5	5	Markus Rogan	Austria	1:58.06	Q
4	5	6	Răzvan Florea	Romania	1:58.81	Q
5	4	4	Gregor Tait	Great Britain	1:59.35	Q
6	5	3	Simon Dufour	France	1:59.52	Q
7	4	3	Bryce Hunt	United States	1:59.82	Q
8	5	2	Jorge Sánchez	Spain	2:00.10	Q
9	5	7	Emanuele Merisi	Italy	2:00.10	Q
10	3	2	Nathaniel O'Brien	Canada	2:00.49	Q
11	5	1	Rogério Romero	Brazil	2:00.60	Q
12	3	4	Gordan Kožulj	Croatia	2:00.94	Q
13	4	2	Keith Beavers	Canada	2:00.97	Q
14	3	5	Arkady Vyatchanin	Russia	2:01.09	Q
15	4	6	Blaž Medvešek	Slovenia	2:01.13	Q
16	3	6	Tomomi Morita	Japan	2:01.19	Q
17	4	7	Yevgeny Aleshin	Russia	2:01.25	
18	3	1	Patrick Murphy	Australia	2:01.26	
19	3	3	Matt Welsh	Australia	2:01.73	
20	4	8	Cameron Gibson	New Zealand	2:02.65	
21	2	5	Alex Lim	Malaysia	2:02.67	
22	2	3	Derya Büyükuncu	Turkey	2:02.69	
23	2	7	Nicholas Neckles	Barbados	2:02.84	
24	4	1	Viktor Bodrogi	Hungary	2:03.16	
25	2	4	Volodymyr Nikolaychuk	Ukraine	2:03.21	
26	2	2	Pavel Suškov	Lithuania	2:03.54	
27	2	1	Adam Mania	Poland	2:03.73	
28	3	8	Antonios Gkioulmpas	Greece	2:04.30	
29	3	7	Aschwin Wildeboer	Spain	2:04.33	
30	5	8	Yu Rui	China	2:04.51	
31	2	6	Ahmed Hussein	Egypt	2:04.82	
32	2	8	Sung Min	South Korea	2:04.86	
33	1	5	Matti Mäki	Finland	2:06.29	
34	1	6	Andrei Mihailov	Moldova	2:06.97	
35	1	2	Omar Pinzón	Colombia	2:07.26	
36	1	3	Iurii Zakharov	Kyrgyzstan	2:10.45	

=== Semifinals ===
Rank	Heat	Lane	Swimmer	Nation	Time	Notes
1	2	4	Aaron Peirsol	United States	1:55.14	Q, OR
2	1	4	James Goddard	Great Britain	1:57.25	Q
3	2	5	Markus Rogan	Austria	1:57.50	Q
4	1	5	Răzvan Florea	Romania	1:58.20	Q
5	2	3	Gregor Tait	Great Britain	1:58.75	Q
6	1	3	Simon Dufour	France	1:58.96	Q
7	2	8	Blaž Medvešek	Slovenia	1:59.37	Q
8	1	8	Tomomi Morita	Japan	1:59.52	Q
9	1	7	Gordan Kožulj	Croatia	1:59.61	
10	2	6	Bryce Hunt	United States	1:59.74	
11	1	1	Arkady Vyatchanin	Russia	1:59.80	
12	2	1	Keith Beavers	Canada	1:59.98	
13	1	6	Jorge Sánchez	Spain	2:00.12	
14	1	2	Nathaniel O'Brien	Canada	2:00.13	
15	2	7	Rogério Romero	Brazil	2:00.48	
16	2	2	Emanuele Merisi	Italy	2:00.83	

=== Final ===
Rank	Lane	Swimmer	Nation	Time	Notes
1st place, gold medalist(s)	4	Aaron Peirsol	United States	1:54.95	OR
2nd place, silver medalist(s)	3	Markus Rogan	Austria	1:57.35	
3rd place, bronze medalist(s)	6	Răzvan Florea	Romania	1:57.56	
4	5	James Goddard	Great Britain	1:57.76	
5	8	Tomomi Morita	Japan	1:58.40	AS
6	7	Simon Dufour	France	1:58.49	
7	2	Gregor Tait	Great Britain	1:59.28	
8	1	Blaž Medvešek	Slovenia	2:00.06	
