= Swimming at the 2003 World Aquatics Championships – Men's 50 metre backstroke =

Men's 50m Backstroke at the 2003 FINA World Aquatics Championships
- Dates: 26 July (prelims); 27 July (final)
- Winning time: 24.80 seconds

Medalists
gold medal	Thomas Rupprath	Germany
silver medal	Matt Welsh	Australia
bronze medal	Gerhard Zandberg	South Africa

The Men's 50 Backstroke event at the 10th FINA World Aquatics Championships swam July 26–27, 2003 in Barcelona, Spain. Preliminary and Semifinal heats were on July 26, with the Final swum on July 27.

Prior to the start of the event, the existing World (WR) and Championship (CR) records were:

- WR: 24.99 swum by Lenny Krayzelburg (USA) on August 28, 1999 in Sydney, Australia
- CR: 25.31 swum by Thomas Rupprath (Germany) on July 24, 2001 in Fukuoka, Japan

== Results ==
=== Final ===
Place	Swimmer	Nation	Time	Notes
1	Thomas Rupprath	Germany	24.80	WR
2	Matt Welsh	Australia	25.01	
3	Gerhard Zandberg	South Africa	25.07	
4	Steffen Driesen	Germany	25.14	
5	Randall Bal	USA	25.19	
6	Darius Grigalionis	Lithuania	25.53	
7	Josh Watson	Australia	25.62	
8	Aaron Peirsol	USA	25.75	

=== Semifinals ===
Rank	Heat + Lane	Swimmer	Nation	Time	Notes
1	S2 L4	Thomas Rupprath	Germany	25.07	q, CR
2	S1 L4	Steffen Driesen	Germany	25.38	q
2	S1 L6	Gerhard Zandberg	South Africa	25.38	q
4	S2 L6	Aaron Peirsol	USA	25.47	q
5	S1 L1	Josh Watson	Australia	25.50	q
6	S2 L5	Randall Bal	USA	25.51	q
7	S1 L5	Matt Welsh	Australia	25.52	q
8	S1 L3	Darius Grigalionis	Lithuania	25.61	q
9	S2 L3	David Ortega	Spain	25.62	
10	S2 L7	Alex Lim	Malaysia	25.68	
11	S2 L8	Ouyang Kunpeng	China	25.74	
12	S1 L7	Tomomi Morita	Japan	25.79	
13	S1 L2	Ahmed Hussein	Egypt	25.81	
14	S2 L2	Arkady Vyatchanin	Russia	25.91	
15	S1 L8	Atsushi Nishikori	Japan	25.95	
16	S2 L1	Vyacheslav Shyrshov	Ukraine	25.99	

=== Preliminaries ===
Rank	Heat+Lane	Swimmer	Nation	Time	Notes
1	H13 L4	Thomas Rupprath	Germany	25.19	q, CR
2	H13 L5	Steffen Driesen	Germany	25.48	q
3	H12 L8	Randall Bal	United States	25.53	q
4	H12 L4	Matt Welsh	Australia	25.60	q
5	H11 L4	David Ortega	Spain	25.71	q
6	H13 L3	Darius Grigalionis	Lithuania	25.76	q
6	H13 L8	Aaron Peirsol	United States	25.76	q
8	H12 L5	Gerhard Zandberg	South Africa	25.80	q
9	H12 L2	Arkady Vyatchanin	Russia	25.85	q
10	H11 L2	Ahmed Hussein	Egypt	25.89	q
11	H12 L3	Alex Lim	Malaysia	25.93	q
11	H12 L7	Tomomi Morita	Japan	25.93	q
13	H10 L8	Vyacheslav Shyrshov	Ukraine	25.97	q
14	H11 L5	Josh Watson	Australia	26.01	q
15	H11 L6	Ouyang Kunpeng	China	26.08	q
15	H13 L6	Atsushi Nishikori	Japan	26.08	q
17	H10 L4	Viktor Bodrogi	Hungary	26.11	
18	H13 L7	Nuno Laurentino	Portugal	26.13	
19	H08 L8	Örn Arnarson	Iceland	26.18	
20	H10 L7	Gregor Tait	Great Britain	26.23	
21	H12 L6	Riley Janes	Canada	26.24	
22	H13 L2	Péter Horváth	Hungary	26.25	
23	H10 L1	Markus Rogan	Austria	26.26	
23	H13 L1	Min Sung	South Korea	26.26	
25	H10 L5	Blaž Medvešek	Slovenia	26.29	
26	H09 L5	Jani Sievinen	Finland	26.30	
27	H10 L2	Pavlo Illichov	Ukraine	26.34	
28	H11 L1	Ales Volcansek	Croatia	26.35	
29	H12 L1	Ryan Pini	Papua New Guinea	26.37	
30	H11 L3	Flori Lang	Switzerland	26.46	
31	H10 L3	Gordan Kožulj	Croatia	26.48	
32	H08 L5	Pablo Martin Abal	Argentina	26.49	
33	H09 L1	Pavel Suškov	Lithuania	26.61	
34	H09 L2	Jens Petersson	Sweden	26.64	
34	H09 L7	Yoav Gath	Israel	26.64	
36	H09 L8	Alexandr Ivlev	Moldova	26.73	
37	H08 L4	Martin Viilep	Estonia	26.76	
38	H09 L3	Eric la Fleur	Sweden	26.83	
39	H09 L4	Paulo Machado	Brazil	26.86	
40	H11 L8	Cameron Gibson	New Zealand	26.94	
41	H01 L3	Rui Yu	China	26.99	
42	H11 L7	Orel Oral	Turkey	27.07	
43	H08 L2	Rogério Romero	Brazil	27.49	
44	H08 L3	Oleg Pukhnaty	Uzbekistan	27.75	
45	H07 L4	Nicholas Bovell	Trinidad and Tobago	28.10	
46	H08 L7	Mauricio Prudencio	Bolivia	28.15	
47	H06 L2	Gustavo Vera	Paraguay	28.31	
48	H07 L5	Albert Subirats	Venezuela	28.35	
49	H06 L4	Jared Heine	Marshall Islands	28.38	
50	H08 L6	Ashby Brendan	Zimbabwe	28.41	
51	H07 L8	Ismael Ortiz	Panama	28.60	
52	H07 L3	Guillermo Andres Ramirez Lemis	Colombia	28.72	
53	H07 L2	V. Arun Vellore	India	28.76	
54	H03 L5	Onan Thom	Guyana	28.80	
55	H08 L1	Mikhail Alekseyev	Uzbekistan	28.82	
56	H06 L6	Yau Sun Fai	Hong Kong	29.01	
57	H06 L3	Asela Pradeep Perera	Sri Lanka	29.21	
58	H06 L7	Chi Lon Lei	Macau	29.24	
59	H07 L6	Abed Rahman Kaaki	Lebanon	29.25	
60	H05 L5	Khaly Ciss	Senegal	29.26	
61	H06 L5	Roberto Sanso	Costa Rica	29.33	
62	H05 L8	Ranui Teriipaia	Tahiti	29.41	
63	H05 L4	Olufolahan Oluwole	Nigeria	29.43	
64	H06 L1	Rony Bakale	Republic of the Congo	29.66	
65	H06 L8	Mohammad Nazeri	Iran	29.74	
66	H05 L6	James B. Walsh	Philippines	29.80	
67	H04 L3	Davy Bisslik	Aruba	29.92	
68	H04 L7	Joao Aguiar	Angola	29.98	
69	H05 L3	Rubel Mohammad Rubel Rana	Bangladesh	30.01	
70	H07 L1	Omar Abu Faris	Jordan	30.06	
71	H07 L7	Yury Zaharov	Kyrgyzstan	30.20	
72	H04 L5	Fadi Jalabi	Syria	30.45	
73	H04 L1	Nuno Rola	Angola	30.68	
74	H03 L4	Patrick Boustany	Lebanon	30.71	
75	H05 L7	Kabir Walia	Kenya	30.72	
76	H04 L6	Seung Gin Lee	Northern Mariana Islands	30.75	
77	H04 L8	Urnultsaikhan Ganbold	Mongolia	30.80	
78	H04 L2	Sean Chow	Fiji	30.84	
79	H03 L3	Clark Randrianandraina	Madagascar	31.55	
80	H02 L4	Welbert Samuel	Federated States of Micronesia	31.80	
81	H02 L5	Peter James Linch	Zambia	32.08	
82	H03 L2	Muzeya Muzyamba	Zambia	32.32	
83	H03 L1	Sarmad A.A. Mohamad	Iraq	32.90	
84	H02 L6	Carlos Notarianni	Marshall Islands	33.12	
85	H03 L8	Mohammed S. Abbas	Iraq	33.21	
86	H05 L2	Hadjamamed Hadjamamedov	Turkmenistan	33.85	
87	H02 L2	Awsan Mohammed Saleh Qardaa	Yemen	45.91	
88	H02 L7	Ali Maiga Akibou	Niger	47.50	
-	-	Gilbert Kaburu	Uganda	DQ	
-	-	James Goddard	Great Britain	DNS	
-	-	Peter Mankoč	Slovenia	DNS	
-	-	Fils Theodore Tchena	Cameroon	DNS	
-	-	Zhmed Ouattara Zie	Ivory Coast	DNS	
-	-	Landry H. Degnifo Enokorin	Ivory Coast	DNS	
-	-	Abubakarr Ialloh	Sierra Leone	DNS	
-	-	Nkandeu Fortin Leukam	Cameroon	DNS	
-	-	Emery Nziyumvira	Burundi	DNS	
