= Swimming at the 2005 World Aquatics Championships – Men's 100 metre backstroke =

Men's 100 metre backstroke at the 2005 FINA World Championships
- Dates: 25 July 2005 (heats, semifinals); 26 July 2005 (final)
- Competitors: 74 from 68 nations
- Winning time: 53.62 seconds

Medalists
gold medal	Aaron Peirsol	United States
silver medal	Randall Bal	United States
bronze medal	László Cseh	Hungary

The men's 100 metre backstroke event at the 2005 World Aquatics Championships took place between 25 July – 26 July. Both the heats and semifinals were held on 25 July with the heats being held in the morning session and the semifinals being held in the evening session. The final was held on 26 July.

== Records ==
Prior to the competition, the existing world and championship records were as follows.

	Name	Nationality	Time	Location	Date
World record	Aaron Peirsol	United States	53.17	Indianapolis	2 April 2005
Championship record	Aaron Peirsol	United States	53.61	Barcelona	22 July 2003

No new world or competition records were set during this competition.

== Results ==
=== Preliminary heats ===
Rank	Heat/Lane	Swimmer	Nationality	Time	Notes
1	H10 L4	Aaron Peirsol	United States	54.41	q
2	H10 L3	Aristeidis Grigoriadis	Greece	54.84	q
3	H9 L4	Randall Bal	United States	54.88	q
3	H10 L2	Andrew Lauterstein	Australia	54.88	q
5	H8 L5	László Cseh	Hungary	54.89	q
6	H8 L4	Markus Rogan	Austria	54.97	q
7	H9 L2	Blaž Medvešek	Slovenia	55.03	q
8	H8 L6	Junichi Miyashita	Japan	55.05	q
9	H9 L3	Arkady Vyatchanin	Russia	55.14	q
10	H9 L7	Răzvan Florea	Romania	55.15	q
11	H10 L1	Gordan Kožulj	Croatia	55.20	q
12	H10 L6	Steffen Driesen	Germany	55.25	q
13	H9 L5	Matt Welsh	Australia	55.40	q
14	H8 L2	Liam Tancock	Great Britain	55.47	q
15	H10 L5	Tomomi Morita	Japan	55.51	q
16	H9 L1	David Ortega	Spain	55.52	q
17	H9 L6	James Goddard	Great Britain	55.66	
18	H7 L6	Vytautas Janušaitis	Lithuania	55.83	
19	H10 L7	Alex Lim	Malaysia	55.88	
20	H8 L3	Marco di Carli	Germany	55.95	
21	H8 L8	Scott Talbot	New Zealand	56.07	
22	H8 L7	Simon Dufour	France	56.10	
23	H7 L4	Cameron Gibson	New Zealand	56.49	
23	H7 L5	Nick Neckles	Barbados	56.49	
25	H7 L1	Pavel Suskov	Lithuania	56.50	
26	H8 L1	Pavlo Illichov	Ukraine	56.58	
27	H6 L4	Gabriel Mangabeira	Brazil	56.64	
28	H7 L8	Yoav Gath	Israel	56.79	
29	H7 L3	Derya Büyükuncu	Turkey	56.81	
30	H7 L7	Tomasz Rumianowski	Poland	56.86	
31	H9 L8	Pierre Roger	France	56.92	
32	H10 L8	Aschwin Wildeboer	Spain	57.28	
33	H7 L2	Örn Arnarson	Iceland	57.43	
34	H5 L4	Garth Tune	South Africa	57.83	
35	H6 L1	Seung-Hyeon Lee	South Korea	58.11	
36	H6 L5	Chris Vythoulkas	Bahamas	58.88	
37	H6 L7	Suriya Suksuphak	Thailand	59.17	
38	H5 L8	Alessio Domenack	Peru	59.69	
39	H4 L5	Jared Heine	Marshall Islands	59.76	
40	H6 L3	Danil Bugakov	Uzbekistan	59.86	
41	H5 L6	Rony Bakale	Republic of the Congo	59.92	
42	H6 L8	Mark Chay	Singapore	1:00.10	
43	H4 L3	Shawn Clarke	Barbados	1:00.15	
44	H5 L2	Andy Wibowo	Indonesia	1:00.65	
45	H5 L3	Oleg Pukhnatiy	Uzbekistan	1:00.98	
46	H4 L2	Jason Dunford	Kenya	1:01.01	
47	H4 L4	Zhi Cong Lim	Singapore	1:01.05	
48	H6 L6	Martin Verner	Czech Republic	1:01.09	
49	H4 L7	Kieran Locke	Virgin Islands	1:01.25	
50	H6 L2	Yury Zaharov	Kyrgyzstan	1:01.31	
51	H4 L6	David Dunford	Kenya	1:01.52	
52	H5 L5	Guntars Deicmans	Latvia	1:01.57	
53	H4 L1	Gael Adam	Mauritius	1:01.60	
54	H3 L3	Francisco Montenegro	Guatemala	1:01.94	
55	H1 L3	Onan Orlando Thom	Guyana	1:02.47	
56	H3 L4	Shahin Baradaran	Iran	1:02.48	
57	H4 L8	LIN Yu-An	Chinese Taipei	1:02.74	
58	H3 L5	Andrei Mihailov	Moldova	1:02.86	
59	H3 L6	Khaly Ciss	Senegal	1:02.95	
60	H3 L2	Chi Lon Lei	Macau	1:03.15	
61	H5 L1	Francois Ghattas	Lebanon	1:03.30	
62	H3 L7	Daniel Carrillo	Paraguay	1:03.43	
63	H3 L1	Antonio Tong	Macau	1:03.45	
64	H2 L1	Horacio Carcamo	Honduras	1:03.71	
65	H2 L2	Yassir Abdalla	Bolivia	1:03.74	
66	H2 L5	Diego Foianini	Bolivia	1:05.25	
67	H5 L7	Romulo Pereira	Angola	1:05.29	
68	H2 L3	Julio Rivera	Honduras	1:05.54	
69	H2 L7	Imdad Ali	Pakistan	1:06.17	
70	H2 L4	Ganbold Urnultsaikhan	Mongolia	1:07.28	
71	H2 L8	Andrey Molchanov	Turkmenistan	1:08.23	
72	H1 L5	Alain Brigion-Tobe	Cameroon	1:08.79	
-	H1 L4	Jonathan Calderon	Saint Lucia	DNS	
-	H2 L6	Leonel Matonse	Mozambique	DNS	

=== Semifinals ===
Rank	Heat/Lane	Swimmer	Nationality	Time	Notes
1	S2 L4	Aaron Peirsol	(United States) USA	54.46	q
2	S2 L5	Randall Bal	(United States) USA	54.49	q
2	S2 L8	Tomomi Morita	Japan	54.49	q
4	S2 L3	László Cseh	Hungary	54.52	q
4	S2 L2	Arkady Vyatchanin	Russia	54.52	q
6	S1 L4	Aristeidis Grigoriadis	Greece	54.69	q
7	S1 L3	Markus Rogan	Austria	54.75	q
8	S2 L6	Blaž Medvešek	Slovenia	54.88	q
9	S2 L1	Matt Welsh	Australia	54.89	
10	S1 L1	Liam Tancock	(United Kingdom) Great Britain	55.07	
11	S2 L7	Gordan Kožulj	Croatia	55.08	
12	S1 L2	Răzvan Florea	Romania	55.34	
13	S1 L7	Steffen Driesen	Germany	55.37	
14	S1 L5	Andrew Lauterstein	Australia	55.43	
15	S1 L6	Junichi Miyashita	Japan	55.44	
16	S1 L8	David Ortega	Spain	55.73	

=== Final ===
Rank	Name	Nationality	Time	Notes
1st place, gold medalist(s)	Aaron Peirsol	(United States) USA	53.62	
2nd place, silver medalist(s)	Randall Bal	(United States) USA	54.02	
3rd place, bronze medalist(s)	László Cseh	Hungary	54.27	
4	Tomomi Morita	Japan	54.31	
5	Arkady Vyatchanin	Russia	54.50	
6	Aristeidis Grigoriadis	Greece	54.61	
7	Markus Rogan	Austria	54.81	
8	Blaž Medvešek	Slovenia	55.13	
