= Swimming at the 2003 World Aquatics Championships – Men's 200 metre backstroke =

Men's 200m Backstroke at the 2003 FINA World Aquatics Championships
- Dates: 24 July (prelims, semifinals); 25 July (final)
- Winning time: 1 minute 55.92 seconds

Medalists
gold medal	Aaron Peirsol	United States
silver medal	Gordan Kožulj	Croatia
bronze medal	Simon Dufour	France

The Men's 200 Backstroke event at the 10th FINA World Aquatics Championships swam July 24–25, 2003 in Barcelona, Spain. Preliminary and Semifinal heats were on 24 July with the heats being held in the morning session and the semifinals being held in the evening session. The Final swam on 25 July.

At the start of the event, the existing World (WR) and Championship (CR) records were:

- WR: 1:55.15 swum by Aaron Peirsol (USA) on March 22, 2002 in Minneapolis, USA
- CR: 1:57.13 swum by Aaron Peirsol (USA) on July 27, 2001 in Fukuoka, Japan

== Results ==
=== Final ===
Place	Swimmer	Nation	Time	Notes
1	Aaron Peirsol	USA	1:55.92	
2	Gordan Kožulj	Croatia	1:57.47	
3	Simon Dufour	France	1:57.90	
4	Bryce Hunt	USA	1:57.92	
5	Matt Welsh	Australia	1:57.94	
6	Arkady Vyatchanin	Russia	1:58.07	
7	Răzvan Florea	Romania	1:58.66	
8	Blaž Medvešek	Slovenia	1:58.96	

=== Semifinals ===
Rank	Heat + Lane	Swimmer	Nation	Time	Notes
1	S2 L4	Aaron Peirsol	USA	1:55.82	q, CR
2	S2 L5	Arkady Vyatchanin	Russia	1:57.88	q
3	S1 L5	Gordan Kožulj	Croatia	1:57.94	q
4	S1 L6	Bryce Hunt	USA	1:58.04	q
5	S1 L4	Matt Welsh	Australia	1:58.34	q
6	S1 L2	Răzvan Florea	Romania	1:58.52	q
7	S2 L6	Simon Dufour	France	1:58.81	q
8	S1 L3	Gregor Tait	Great Britain	1:59.02	swim off
8	S1 L7	Blaž Medvešek	Slovenia	1:59.02	swim off, q
10	S2 L2	Yoav Gath	Israel	1:59.22	
11	S2 L7	Markus Rogan	Austria	1:59.29	
12	S2 L1	Steffen Driesen	Germany	1:59.40	
13	S2 L3	László Cseh	Hungary	1:59.45	
14	S2 L8	Keith Beavers	Canada	1:59.86	
15	S1 L1	Jorge Sánchez	Spain	2:00.19	
16	S1 L8	Helge Meeuw	Germany	2:00.21	

Swim-off for 8th

1. Blaz Medvesk (Slovenia) -- 1:58.61—q
2. Gregor Tait (Great Britain) -- 1:58.80

=== Preliminaries ===
Rank	Heat+Lane	Swimmer	Nation	Time	Notes
1	H8 L4	Aaron Peirsol	United States	1:57.28	q
2	H6 L5	Matt Welsh	Australia	1:58.26	q
3	H8 L1	Arkady Vyatchanin	Russia	1:59.18	q
4	H7 L4	Gordan Kožulj	Croatia	1:59.20	q
5	H8 L6	László Cseh	Hungary	1:59.49	q
6	H8 L2	Gregor Tait	Great Britain	1:59.62	q
7	H8 L3	Simon Dufour	France	1:59.68	q
8	H7 L2	Bryce Hunt	United States	1:59.71	q
9	H7 L8	Yoav Gath	Israel	1:59.82	q
10	H8 L5	Răzvan Florea	Romania	1:59.96	q
11	H7 L5	Markus Rogan	Austria	2:00.04	q
12	H6 L7	Blaž Medvešek	Slovenia	2:00.06	q
12	H8 L7	Steffen Driesen	Germany	2:00.06	q
14	H7 L6	Jorge Sánchez	Spain	2:00.27	q
15	H7 L3	Keith Beavers	Canada	2:00.56	q
16	H6 L8	Helge Meeuw	Germany	2:00.73	q
17	H5 L1	Anton Bugayov	Ukraine	2:00.76	
18	H6 L2	Ray Hass	Australia	2:00.77	
19	H4 L3	Tomomi Morita	Japan	2:01.10	
20	H5 L2	Volodymyr Nikolaychuk	Ukraine	2:01.35	
21	H6 L6	Evgueni Alechine	Russia	2:01.42	
22	H5 L7	Alex Lim	Malaysia	2:01.43	
23	H6 L3	Ouyang Kunpeng	China	2:01.44	
24	H7 L1	Klaas Erik Zwering	Netherlands	2:01.56	
25	H6 L4	James Goddard	Great Britain	2:01.91	
26	H5 L4	Rogério Romero	Brazil	2:02.06	
27	H6 L1	Cameron Gibson	New Zealand	2:02.36	
28	H5 L5	Ahmed Hussein	Egypt	2:02.45	
29	H4 L4	Pavel Suškov	Lithuania	2:02.65	
30	H8 L8	Rui Yu	China	2:02.80	
31	H7 L7	Viktor Bodrogi	Hungary	2:03.22	
32	H5 L6	Min Sung	South Korea	2:04.10	
33	H5 L8	Paulo Machado	Brazil	2:04.21	
34	H3 L6	Květoslav Svoboda	Czech Republic	2:04.96	
35	H5 L3	Sander Ganzevles	Netherlands	2:05.05	
36	H4 L2	Martin Viilep	Estonia	2:05.82	
37	H4 L5	Andrei Mihailov	Moldova	2:08.30	
38	H3 L2	Jared Heine	Marshall Islands	2:08.88	
39	H3 L4	Juan Carlo Antonio Piccio	Philippines	2:10.18	
40	H4 L8	Ashby Brendan	Zimbabwe	2:10.40	
41	H3 L3	Yau Sun Fai	Hong Kong	2:10.55	
42	H2 L5	Kunakorn Yimsomruay	Thailand	2:11.18	
43	H3 L1	Long Do Huy	Vietnam	2:13.43	
44	H4 L6	Yury Zaharov	Kyrgyzstan	2:13.81	
45	H4 L1	Guillermo Andres Ramirez Lemis	Colombia	2:14.18	
46	H4 L7	Mauricio Prudencio	Bolivia	2:14.30	
47	H3 L5	Mikhail Alekseyev	Uzbekistan	2:14.55	
48	H2 L4	Oleg Deikrishvili	Georgia	2:16.10	
49	H2 L6	Mohammad Nazeri	Iran	2:18.09	
50	H3 L8	Rony Bakale	Republic of the Congo	2:19.03	
51	H2 L8	Seung Gin Lee	Northern Mariana Islands	2:19.89	
52	H2 L3	Omar Abu Faris	Jordan	2:20.02	
53	H2 L1	Chi Lon Lei	Macau	2:21.29	
54	H1 L4	Ammar Musaed Al Tamimi	United Arab Emirates	2:22.56	
55	H2 L2	Nuno Rola	Angola	2:25.33	
56	H1 L5	Kabir Walia	Kenya	2:25.49	
57	H1 L6	Patrick Boustany	Lebanon	2:27.31	
58	H1 L3	Clark Randrianandraina	Madagascar	2:33.65	
59	H1 L2	Muzeya Muzyamba	Zambia	2:34.69	
-	-	Ryan Pini	Papua New Guinea	DNS	
