= 2006 Pan Pacific Swimming Championships – Men's 100 metre backstroke =

Men's 100 metre backstroke at the 2006 Pan Pacific Swimming Championships
- Venue: Saanich Commonwealth Place
- Dates: August 17, 2006 (heats & finals)
- Competitors: 33 from 11 nations
- Winning time: 53.32

Medalists
gold medal	Aaron Peirsol	United States
silver medal	Ryan Lochte	United States
bronze medal	Tomomi Morita	Japan

The men's 100 metre backstroke competition at the 2006 Pan Pacific Swimming Championships took place on August 17 at the Saanich Commonwealth Place. The last champion was Aaron Peirsol of US.

This race consisted of two lengths of the pool, all in backstroke.

== Records ==
Prior to this competition, the existing world and Pan Pacific records were as follows:

World record	Aaron Peirsol (USA)	53.17	Indianapolis, United States	April 2, 2005
Pan Pacific Championships record	Lenny Krayzelburg (USA)	53.60	Sydney, Australia	August 27, 1999

== Results ==
All times are in minutes and seconds.

KEY:	q	Fastest non-qualifiers	Q	Qualified	CR	Championships record	NR	National record	PB	Personal best	SB	Seasonal best

=== Heats ===
The first round was held on August 17, at 10:47.

Rank	Heat	Lane	Name	Nationality	Time	Notes
1	3	5	Ryan Lochte	United States	53.78	QA
2	5	4	Aaron Peirsol	United States	53.88	QA
3	3	4	Randall Bal	United States	54.09	QA
4	4	4	Tomomi Morita	Japan	54.75	QA
5	5	3	Peter Marshall	United States	54.83	QA
6	5	5	Junichi Miyashita	Japan	54.90	QA
7	3	3	David Plummer	United States	55.04	QA
8	4	3	Matt Welsh	Australia	55.14	QA
9	4	2	Ashley Delaney	Australia	55.32	QB
10	4	5	Masafumi Yamaguchi	Japan	55.42	QB
11	5	6	Gerhard Zandberg	South Africa	55.45	QB
12	4	6	Andrew Lauterstein	Australia	55.56	QB
13	5	7	Hayden Stoeckel	Australia	55.69	QB
14	5	2	Ryosuke Irie	Japan	55.72	QB
15	4	7	Sun Hongzhe	United States	56.07	QB
16	3	2	George Du Rand	South Africa	56.13	QB
17	3	6	Ethan Rolff	Australia	56.32	
18	5	1	Lucas Salatta	Brazil	56.48	
19	4	1	Keng Liat Lim	Malaysia	56.96	
20	3	7	Matthew Hawes	Canada	56.99	
21	5	8	Jake Tapp	Canada	57.03	
22	3	1	Keith Beavers	Canada	57.36	
23	4	8	Pascal Wollach	Canada	57.46	
24	2	3	Charles Francis	Canada	57.68	
25	2	4	Lee Seung-Hyeon	South Korea	57.81	
26	1	5	Sun Xiaolei	China	57.94	
27	2	7	John Zulch	New Zealand	58.07	
28	2	5	Dean Kent	New Zealand	58.86	
29	2	2	Feng Lizhong	China	59.35	
30	2	6	Yuan Ping	Chinese Taipei	1:00.48	
31	3	8	Zhang Yu	China	1:00.60	
32	1	4	Lin Yu-An	Chinese Taipei	1:00.97	
33	1	3	Bogdan Knezevic	Canada	1:04.01	

=== B Final ===
The B final was held on August 17, at 19:24.

Rank	Lane	Name	Nationality	Time	Notes
9	4	Randall Bal	United States	53.84	
10	5	Masafumi Yamaguchi	Japan	55.06	
11	3	Andrew Lauterstein	Australia	55.53	
12	1	Jake Tapp	Canada	57.19	
13	2	Keng Liat Lim	Malaysia	57.45	
14	7	Matthew Hawes	Canada	57.46	
15	6	Lucas Salatta	Brazil	57.65	
16	8	Lee Seung-Hyeon	South Korea	58.14	

=== A Final ===
The A final was held on August 17, at 19:24.

Rank	Lane	Name	Nationality	Time	Notes
1st place, gold medalist(s)	5	Aaron Peirsol	United States	53.32	CR
2nd place, silver medalist(s)	4	Ryan Lochte	United States	54.02	
3rd place, bronze medalist(s)	3	Tomomi Morita	Japan	54.38	
4	6	Junichi Miyashita	Japan	54.71	
5	2	Matt Welsh	Australia	55.12	
6	7	Ashley Delaney	Australia	55.43	
7	1	Gerhard Zandberg	South Africa	55.65	
8	8	George Du Rand	South Africa	56.55	
