= Swimming at the 2007 World Aquatics Championships – Men's 100 metre backstroke =

Men's 100 metre backstroke at the 2007 FINA World Championships
- Venue: Rod Laver Arena
- Date: March 2007
- Competitors: 92
- Winning time: 52.98 WR

Medalists
gold medal	Aaron Peirsol	United States
silver medal	Ryan Lochte	United States
bronze medal	Liam Tancock	Great Britain

The men's 100 metre backstroke at the 2007 World Aquatics Championships took place on 26 March (heats and semifinals) and the evening of 27 March (final) at the Rod Laver Arena in Melbourne, Australia. 92 swimmers were entered in the event, of which 90 swam.

Existing records at the start of the event were:

- World record (WR): 53.17, Aaron Peirsol (USA), 2 April 2005 in Indianapolis, Indiana, USA.
- Championship record (CR): 53.61, Aaron Peirsol (USA), Barcelona 2003 (22 July 2003)

== Results ==
=== Final ===
Place	Lane	Name	Nationality	50m Split	Time
1st place, gold medalist(s)	3	Aaron Peirsol	United States	25.80	52.98 WR
2nd place, silver medalist(s)	4	Ryan Lochte	United States	25.77	53.50
3rd place, bronze medalist(s)	5	Liam Tancock	United Kingdom	25.68	53.61
4	2	Arkady Vyatchanin	Russia	26.40	53.69
5	6	Markus Rogan	Austria	26.58	53.78
6	7	Gerhard Zandberg	South Africa	26.07	54.59
7	8	Matt Welsh	Australia	26.61	54.65
8	1	Tomomi Morita	Japan	26.47	55.04

=== Semifinals ===
Rank	Heat Lane	Name	Nationality	50m split	Time	Notes
1	S2 L2	Ryan Lochte	United States	25.80	53.51 CR	Q
2	S1 L4	Liam Tancock	Great Britain	25.85	53.71	Q
3	S1 L5	Aaron Peirsol	United States	26.08	53.92	Q
4	S2 L4	Markus Rogan	Austria	26.24	53.98	Q
5	S1 L3	Arkady Vyatchanin	Russia	26.89	54.30	Q
6	S2 L5	Gerhard Zandberg	South Africa	26.29	54.54	Q
7	S2 L6	Tomomi Morita	Japan	26.48	54.77	Q
8	S2 L1	Matt Welsh	Australia	26.63	54.92	Q
9	S2 L8	Steffen Driesen	Germany	26.58	54.97	
10	S1 L1	Răzvan Florea	Romania	26.61	55.02	
11	S2 L3	Aristeidis Grigoriadis	Greece	26.56	55.12	
12	S1 L7	Thiago Pereira	Brazil	27.01	55.30	
13	S1 L6	Matthew Clay	Great Britain	26.20	55.32	
14	S2 L7	Masafumi Yamaguchi	Japan	26.59	55.34	
15	S1 L2	Helge Meeuw	Germany	26.95	55.37	
16	S1 L8	Hayden Stoeckel	Australia	27.11	55.51	

=== Heats ===
Rank	Heat Lane	Name	Nationality	50m split	Time	Notes
1	H10 L5	Markus Rogan	Austria	26.89	54.34	Q
2	H11 L3	Liam Tancock	Great Britain	25.65	54.54	Q
3	H12 L7	Gerhard Zandberg	South Africa	26.47	54.83	Q
4	H12 L4	Aaron Peirsol	United States	26.66	54.88	Q
5	H12 L3	Aristeidis Grigoriadis	Greece	26.31	54.95	Q
6	H10 L4	Arkady Vyatchanin	Russia	27.38	55.00	Q
7	H11 L5	Tomomi Morita	Japan	26.60	55.06	Q
8	H10 L3	Matthew Clay	Great Britain	26.72	55.07	Q
9	H12 L5	Ryan Lochte	United States	27.00	55.08	Q
10	H11 L4	Helge Meeuw	Germany	26.55	55.11	Q
11	H12 L6	Masafumi Yamaguchi	Japan	26.80	55.30	Q
12	H09 L4	Vytautas Janušaitis	Lithuania	26.65	55.36	Q
13	H09 L6	Thiago Pereira	Brazil	27.04	55.44	Q
14	H12 L2	Matt Welsh	Australia	26.36	55.50	Q
15	H10 L7	Răzvan Florea	Romania	26.82	55.53	Q
16	H10 L6	Steffen Driesen	Germany	26.97	55.63	Q
17	H11 L2	Hayden Stoeckel	Australia	26.57	55.64	
18	H11 L6	Ouyang Kunpeng	China	26.69	55.75	
19	H09 L8	Guy Barne'a	Israel	26.83	55.88	
20	H10 L1	Damiano Lestingi	Italy	27.46	56.07	
21	H11 L1	Ľuboš Križko	Slovakia	26.93	56.13	
22	H12 L1	Evgeny Aleshin	Russia	26.93	56.14	
23	H11 L7	Simon Dufour	France	27.21	56.15	
24	H10 L2	Andriy Oleynyk	Ukraine	27.37	56.18	
25	H09 L3	Nicholas Neckles	Barbados	27.22	56.20	
26	H11 L8	Leonardo Guedes	Brazil	27.19	56.42	
27	H10 L8	Derya Büyükuncu	Turkey	27.37	56.50	
28	H09 L5	George du Rand	South Africa	27.55	56.59	
29	H09 L7	Ehud Segal	Israel	27.66	56.73	
30	H12 L8	Zhang Bodong	China	27.28	56.87	
31	H07 L4	Pedro Oliveira	Portugal	27.79	56.96	
32	H08 L5	Pavel Sankovich	Belarus	27.42	57.09	
33	H08 L4	Flori Lang	Switzerland	27.24	57.10	
34	H09 L1	Cameron Gibson	New Zealand	27.58	57.40	
35	H08 L6	Mathias Gydesen	Denmark	27.96	57.46	
36	H08 L7	Eduardo German Otero	Argentina	27.49	57.50	
37	H09 L2	Ante Cvitkovic	Croatia	28.09	57.57	
38	H07 L3	Tomas Fucik	Czech Republic	27.89	57.69	
39	H08 L8	Seunghyeon Lee	South Korea	27.80	58.08	
40	H08 L2	Stanislav Osinsky	Kazakhstan	27.67	58.20	
41	H08 L1	Kim Torry Simmenes	Norway	27.21	58.24	
42	H08 L3	Ivan Tolic	Croatia	27.97	58.36	
43	H07 L2	Danil Bugakov	Uzbekistan	28.20	58.74	
44	H06 L8	Taki Mrabet	Tunisia	28.31	58.82	
45	H07 L6	David Dunford	Kenya	28.31	58.86	
46	H06 L6	Miguel Robles	Mexico	28.53	58.96	
47	H07 L8	Geoffrey Robin Cheah	Hong Kong	28.64	59.15	
48	H07 L1	Ioannis Giannoulis	Greece	28.71	59.22	
49	H04 L2	Felix Cristiadi Sutanto	Indonesia	29.13	59.39	
50	H06 L2	Sergey Pankov	Uzbekistan	29.17	59.99	
51	H06 L4	Jared Heine	Marshall Islands	28.70	1:00.28	
52	H07 L5	Rony Bakale	Republic of the Congo	29.06	1:00.44	
53	H07 L7	Iurii Zakharov	Kyrgyzstan	29.03	1:00.64	
54	H06 L3	Suriya Suksuphak	Thailand	29.37	1:00.73	
55	H04 L3	Giorgios Mylonas	Cyprus	28.80	1:00.91	
56	H06 L5	Yu An Lin	Chinese Taipei	29.17	1:00.95	
57	H05 L2	Sandeep Nagar Anthal	India	29.81	1:00.98	
58	H05 L7	Zhi Cong Lim	Singapore	29.69	1:01.09	
59	H05 L4	Gael Adam	Mauritius	29.55	1:01.15	
60	H05 L1	Wei Shien Zach Ong	Singapore	29.52	1:01.27	
61	H05 L3	Juan Montenegro	Guatemala	30.12	1:01.36	
62	H05 L5	Shahin Baradaran Nakhjavani	Iran	29.16	1:01.56	
63	H04 L4	Souhaib Kalala	Syria	30.35	1:01.66	
64	H05 L8	Amine Kouam	Morocco	29.65	1:01.78	
65	H06 L7	Mario Montoya	Costa Rica	30.25	1:01.84	
66	H03 L4	Yousuf Alyousuf	Saudi Arabia	30.45	1:01.87	
67	H04 L7	Carlos Eduardo Gil	Peru	30.36	1:02.03	
68	H01 L4	Eric Chang	Malaysia	29.82	1:02.32	
69	H05 L6	Arjun Muralidharan	India	29.42	1:02.35	
70	H02 L8	Roy-Allan Burch	Bermuda	29.33	1:02.72	
71	H04 L6	Heshan Unamboowe	Sri Lanka	30.61	1:02.84	
72	H04 L1	Melvin Chua	Malaysia	30.70	1:03.10	
73	H03 L5	Khaly Ciss	Senegal	31.03	1:03.23	
74	H03 L1	Rainui Terupaia	Tahiti	31.56	1:04.66	
75	H04 L5	Nuno Rola	Angola	31.34	1:05.55	
76	H04 L8	Ahmed Salamoun	Qatar	31.21	1:05.77	
77	H02 L4	Andrey Molchanov	Turkmenistan	31.19	1:05.95	
77	H03 L3	Tural Abbasov	Azerbaijan	30.79	1:05.95	
79	H03 L6	Fadi Awesat	Palestine	31.62	1:06.20	
80	H03 L8	Kin Wa Cheong	Macau	32.52	1:07.19	
81	H03 L7	Richard Randrianandraina	Madagascar	32.43	1:08.73	
82	H02 L5	Celestino Aguon	Guam	33.32	1:09.18	
83	H02 L3	Jamaal Sobers	Guyana	32.80	1:10.05	
84	H02 L6	Timur Atahanov	Turkmenistan	33.19	1:12.50	
85	H01 L6	Yannick Roberts	Guyana	35.04	1:12.78	
86	H02 L2	Ali Zayeri	Brunei	36.81	1:15.39	
87	H02 L7	Ibrahim Shameel	Maldives	39.24	1:24.63	
88	H02 L1	Mohammed Al Qerbi	Yemen	40.46	1:24.75	
89	H01 L3	Boipelo Makhothi	Lesotho	42.61	1:32.14	
90	H01 L5	Thabiso Gilbert	Lesotho	43.00	1:35.01	
	H03 L2	Samson Opuakpo	Nigeria		DNS	
	H06 L1	Mohammad Rubel	Bangladesh		DNS	

== See also ==
- Swimming at the 2008 Summer Olympics – Men's 100 metre backstroke
