= 2006 Pan Pacific Swimming Championships – Men's 200 metre backstroke =

Men's 200 metre backstroke at the 2006 Pan Pacific Swimming Championships
- Venue: Saanich Commonwealth Place; Saanich, British Columbia, Canada
- Dates: August 19, 2006 (heats & finals)
- Competitors: 28 from 11 nations
- Winning time: 1:54.44

Medalists
gold medal	Aaron Peirsol	United States
silver medal	Michael Phelps	United States
bronze medal	Tomomi Morita	Japan

The men's 200 metre backstroke competition at the 2006 Pan Pacific Swimming Championships took place on August 19 at the Saanich Commonwealth Place. The last champion was Aaron Peirsol of US.

This race consisted of four lengths of the pool, all in backstroke.

== Records ==
Prior to this competition, the existing world and Pan Pacific records were as follows:

World record	Aaron Peirsol (USA)	1:54.66	Montreal, Quebec, Canada	July 29, 2005
Pan Pacific Championships record	Lenny Krayzelburg (USA)	1:55.87	Sydney, Australia	August 27, 1999

== Results ==
All times are in minutes and seconds.

KEY:	q	Fastest non-qualifiers	Q	Qualified	CR	Championships record	NR	National record	PB	Personal best	SB	Seasonal best

=== Heats ===
The first round was held on August 19, at 11:14.

Rank	Heat	Lane	Name	Nationality	Time	Notes
1	4	4	Aaron Peirsol	United States	1:56.81	QA
2	3	4	Michael Phelps	United States	1:57.64	QA
3	4	5	Tomomi Morita	Japan	1:59.10	QA
4	2	4	Ryan Lochte	United States	1:59.30	QA
5	2	5	Ryosuke Irie	Japan	1:59.89	QA
6	3	3	Masafumi Yamaguchi	Japan	2:00.01	QA
7	3	2	Hayden Stoeckel	Australia	2:00.47	QA
8	2	6	Sun Hongzhe	United States	2:00.55	QA
9	2	3	Ephraim Hannant	Australia	2:00.56	QB
10	4	2	Lucas Salatta	Brazil	2:00.73	QB
11	4	7	Matthew Hawes	Canada	2:00.75	QB
12	3	5	Keith Beavers	Canada	2:00.92	QB
13	4	6	George Du Rand	South Africa	2:01.24	QB
14	2	2	Junichi Miyashita	Japan	2:01.55	QB
15	3	7	David Plummer	United States	2:01.89	QB
16	2	7	Ethan Rolff	Australia	2:02.80	QB
17	2	1	Ashley Delaney	Australia	2:03.42	
18	1	3	Jake Tapp	Canada	2:04.51	
19	1	4	John Zulch	New Zealand	2:04.70	
20	2	8	André Schultz	Brazil	2:04.91	
21	3	1	Lee Seung-Hyeon	South Korea	2:04.92	
22	4	1	Dean Kent	New Zealand	2:05.00	
23	4	3	Keng Liat Lim	Malaysia	2:06.52	
24	3	6	Cameron Gibson	New Zealand	2:07.30	
25	4	8	Zhang Yu	China	2:11.03	
26	1	6	Feng Lizhong	China	2:11.77	
27	1	5	Yuan Ping	Chinese Taipei	2:12.38	
28	1	2	Lin Yu-An	Chinese Taipei	2:13.99	
-	3	8	Charles Francis	Canada	DSQ	

=== B Final ===
The B final was held on August 19, at 19:33.

Rank	Lane	Name	Nationality	Time	Notes
9	4	Masafumi Yamaguchi	Japan	2:00.05	
10	5	Sun Hongzhe	United States	2:00.54	
11	3	Keith Beavers	Canada	2:00.57	
12	6	George Du Rand	South Africa	2:01.26	
13	2	Ethan Rolff	Australia	2:03.22	
14	8	André Schultz	Brazil	2:05.32	
15	7	Jake Tapp	Canada	2:05.47	
16	1	John Zulch	New Zealand	2:06.12	

=== A Final ===
The A final was held on August 19, at 19:33.

Rank	Lane	Name	Nationality	Time	Notes
1st place, gold medalist(s)	4	Aaron Peirsol	United States	1:54.44	WR
2nd place, silver medalist(s)	5	Michael Phelps	United States	1:56.81	
3rd place, bronze medalist(s)	3	Tomomi Morita	Japan	1:58.53	
4	6	Ryosuke Irie	Japan	1:59.33	
5	2	Hayden Stoeckel	Australia	2:00.52	
6	7	Ephraim Hannant	Australia	2:01.05	
7	8	Matthew Hawes	Canada	2:01.41	
8	1	Lucas Salatta	Brazil	2:03.26	
