= 2010 Pan Pacific Swimming Championships – Men's 100 metre backstroke =

Men's 100 metre backstroke at the 2010 Pan Pacific Swimming Championships
- Venue: William Woollett Jr. Aquatics Center
- Dates: August 18, 2010 (heats & finals)
- Competitors: 27 from 10 nations
- Winning time: 53.31

Medalists
gold medal	Aaron Peirsol	United States
silver medal	Junya Koga	Japan
bronze medal	Ashley Delaney	Australia

The men's 100 metre backstroke competition at the 2010 Pan Pacific Swimming Championships took place on August 18 at the William Woollett Jr. Aquatics Center. The last champion was Aaron Peirsol of US.

This race consisted of two lengths of the pool, all in backstroke.

== Records ==
Prior to this competition, the existing world and Pan Pacific records were as follows:

World record	Aaron Peirsol (USA)	51.94	Indianapolis, United States	July 8, 2009
Pan Pacific Championships record	Aaron Peirsol (USA)	53.32	Victoria, Canada	August 17, 2006

== Results ==
All times are in minutes and seconds.

KEY:	q	Fastest non-qualifiers	Q	Qualified	CR	Championships record	NR	National record	PB	Personal best	SB	Seasonal best

=== Heats ===
The first round was held on August 18, at 10:59.

Rank	Heat	Lane	Name	Nationality	Time	Notes
1	4	5	David Plummer	United States	53.33	QA
2	4	7	Ryan Lochte	United States	53.69	QA
3	4	4	Ashley Delaney	Australia	53.78	QA
4	4	3	Aaron Peirsol	United States	53.85	QA
5	3	3	Nick Thoman	United States	53.96	QA
6	3	5	Hayden Stoeckel	Australia	54.05	QA
7	2	5	Ryosuke Irie	Japan	54.18	QA
8	2	4	Junya Koga	Japan	54.39	QA
9	3	4	Guilherme Guido	Brazil	54.79	QB
9	3	2	Masafumi Yamaguchi	Japan	54.79	QB
11	2	4	Daniel Arnamnart	Australia	54.81	QB
12	2	1	Gareth Kean	New Zealand	55.00	QB
13	2	7	Ben Treffers	Australia	55.02	QB
14	2	3	George Du Rand	South Africa	55.08	QB
15	4	2	Gabriel Mangabeira	Brazil	55.15	QB
16	4	1	Jake Tapp	Canada	55.31	QB
17	3	6	Daniel Bell	New Zealand	55.32	
18	3	1	Tobias Oriwol	Canada	55.37	
19	4	8	Kuninori Tada	Japan	55.60	
20	3	8	Matt Hawes	Canada	55.65	
21	3	7	Charles Francis	Canada	55.73	
22	2	2	Park Seon-Kwan	South Korea	56.01	
23	2	8	Matthew Swanston	Canada	56.34	
24	4	6	Federico Grabich	Argentina	56.38	
25	1	5	Andrew Ford	Canada	57.05	
26	1	4	Nicholas Sinclair	Canada	57.58	
27	1	3	Chung Lai-Yeung	Hong Kong	59.95	

=== B Final ===
The B final was held on August 18, at 19:18.

Rank	Lane	Name	Nationality	Time	Notes
9	4	Nick Thoman	United States	53.66	
10	5	Masafumi Yamaguchi	Japan	54.98	
11	8	Tobias Oriwol	Canada	55.34	
12	6	George Du Rand	South Africa	55.36	
13	1	Daniel Bell	New Zealand	55.37	
14	7	Jake Tapp	Canada	55.47	
15	2	Gabriel Mangabeira	Brazil	56.01	
16	3	Daniel Arnamnart	Australia	56.08	

=== A Final ===
The A final was held on August 18, at 19:18.

Rank	Lane	Name	Nationality	Time	Notes
1st place, gold medalist(s)	3	Aaron Peirsol	United States	53.31	CR
2nd place, silver medalist(s)	7	Junya Koga	Japan	53.63	
3rd place, bronze medalist(s)	5	Ashley Delaney	Australia	53.67	
4	2	Ryosuke Irie	Japan	53.71	
5	4	David Plummer	United States	53.80	
6	6	Hayden Stoeckel	Australia	54.06	
7	8	Gareth Kean	New Zealand	54.57	
8	1	Guilherme Guido	Brazil	55.05	
