= Swimming at the 2001 World Aquatics Championships – Men's 200 metre backstroke =

Men's 200 metre backstroke at the 2001 FINA World Championships
- Dates: 26 July 2001 (heats, semifinals); 27 July 2001 (final)
- Competitors: 42
- Winning time: 1 minute 57.13 seconds

Medalists
gold medal	Aaron Peirsol	United States
silver medal	Markus Rogan	Austria
bronze medal	Örn Arnarson	Iceland

The men's 200 metre backstroke event at the 2001 World Aquatics Championships took place 27 July. The heats and semifinals took place 26 July, with the final being held on 27 July.

== Records ==
Prior to the competition, the existing world and championship records were as follows:

World record	Lenny Krayzelburg (USA)	1:55.87	Sydney, Australia	27 August 1999
Championship record	Vladimir Selkov (RUS)	1:57.42	Rome, Italy	7 September 1994

The following record was established during the competition:

Date	Round	Name	Nation	Time	Record
27 July	Final	Aaron Peirsol	United States	1:57.13	CR

== Results ==
=== Heats ===
Rank	Name	Nationality	Time	Notes
1	Aaron Peirsol	United States	1:59.79	Q
2	Marc Lindsay	United States	2:00.12	Q
3	Viktor Bodrogi	Hungary	2:00.27	Q
4	Matt Welsh	Australia	2:00.63	Q
5	Örn Arnarson	Iceland	2:00.66	Q
6	Yoav Gath	Israel	2:00.72	Q
7	Emanuele Merisi	Italy	2:00.82	Q
8	Marko Strahija	Croatia	2:00.97	Q
9	Gordan Kožulj	Croatia	2:01.19	Q
10	Rogerio Romero	Brazil	2:01.30	Q
11	Markus Rogan	Austria	2:01.35	Q
12	Klaas-Erik Zwering	Netherlands	2:01.36	Q, WD
13	Pierre Roger	France	2:01.41	Q
14	Raymond Hass	Australia	2:01.42	Q
15	Tobias Oriwol	Canada	2:01.57	Q
16	Kozan Hashimoto	Japan	2:01.61	Q
17	Steffen Driesen	Germany	2:02.40	Q
18	Haruki Takeuchi	Japan	2:02.43	
19	Miroslav Machovič	Slovakia	2:02.48	
20	Péter Horváth	Hungary	2:02.74	
21	Keng Liat Lim	Malaysia	2:03.17	
22	Blaž Medvešek	Slovenia	2:03.45	
23	Eduardo Germán Otero	Argentina	2:03.81	
24	Ioannis Kokkodis	Greece	2:04.82	
25	Zheng Shibin	China	2:04.94	
26	Martin Viilep	Estonia	2:05.19	
27	George Gleason	United States Virgin Islands	2:05.21	
28	Philipp Gilgen	Switzerland	2:05.23	
29	Diego Urreta	Mexico	2:06.04	
30	Gary Tan	Singapore	2:06.45	
31	Juan Carlos Rodela	Mexico	2:07.90	
32	Gerald Koh	Singapore	2:08.30	
33	Sergio Cabrera	Paraguay	2:09.43	
34	Ignacio Bengoechea	Chile	2:11.27	
35	Christophee Backisavs	Dominican Republic	2:14.50	
36	Eduardo Gil	El Salvador	2:14.63	
37	Wu Nien-Pin	Chinese Taipei	2:14.71	
38	Hsu Kuo-Tung	Chinese Taipei	2:18.03	
39	Chi Lon Lei	Macau	2:19.12	
40	Mohammad Nazeri	Iran	2:19.91	
41	Rony Bakale	Republic of the Congo	2:26.44	
–	Hojamammed Hojamammedou	Turkmenistan	DSQ	
–	George Bovell	Trinidad and Tobago	DNS	

=== Semifinals ===
Rank	Name	Nationality	Time	Notes
1	Aaron Peirsol	United States	1:58.12	Q
2	Markus Rogan	Austria	1:58.91	Q
3	Viktor Bodrogi	Hungary	1:59.24	Q
4	Matt Welsh	Australia	1:59.34	Q
5	Yoav Gath	Israel	1:59.39	Q
6	Örn Arnarson	Iceland	1:59.75	Q
7	Gordan Kožulj	Croatia	1:59.80	Q
8	Emanuele Merisi	Italy	1:59.98	Q
9	Raymond Hass	Australia	1:59.99	
10	Marc Lindsay	United States	2:00.72	
11	Marko Strahija	Croatia	2:00.98	
12	Rogerio Romero	Brazil	2:01.05	
13	Tobias Oriwol	Canada	2:01.33	
14	Kozan Hashimoto	Japan	2:01.34	
15	Steffen Driesen	Germany	2:01.54	
16	Pierre Roger	France	2:02.98	

=== Final ===
Rank	Name	Nationality	Time	Notes
1st place, gold medalist(s)	Aaron Peirsol	United States	1:57.13	CR
2nd place, silver medalist(s)	Markus Rogan	Austria	1:58.07	
3rd place, bronze medalist(s)	Örn Arnarson	Iceland	1:58.37	
4	Matt Welsh	Australia	1:58.80	
5	Gordan Kožulj	Croatia	1:59.23	
6	Viktor Bodrogi	Hungary	1:59.74	
7	Emanuele Merisi	Italy	1:59.83	
8	Yoav Gath	Israel	2:00.09	
