= Antonios Gioulbas =

Greek swimmer (born 1986)

Personal information
- Full name: Antonios Gioulbas
- National team: Greece
- Born: 17 April 1986 (age 40) Marousi, Greece
- Height: 1.80 m (5 ft 11 in)
- Weight: 70 kg (154 lb)

Sport
- Sport: Swimming
- Strokes: Backstroke
- Club: Ilisiakos

Antonios Gioulbas (also Antonios Gkioulmpas, Greek: Αντώνιος Γκιούλμπας; born April 17, 1986) is a Greek former swimmer, who specialized in backstroke events. Gioulbas qualified for the men's 200 m backstroke at the 2004 Summer Olympics in Athens, representing the host nation Greece. He cleared a FINA B-standard entry time of 2:01.35 from a test event at the Athens Olympic Aquatic Centre. He challenged seven other swimmers on the third heat, including top medal favorite Tomomi Morita of Japan. He touched out Spain's Aschwin Wildeboer to take a seventh spot by 0.03 of a second in 2:04.30. Gioulbas failed to advance into the semifinals, as he placed twenty-eighth overall in the preliminaries.
