= 2006 Pan Pacific Swimming Championships – Men's 4 × 100 metre medley relay =

Men's 4 × 100 metre medley relay at the 2006 Pan Pacific Swimming Championships
- Venue: Saanich Commonwealth Place
- Dates: August 20, 2006 (heats & finals)
- Winning time: 3:31.79

Medalists
gold medal	Aaron Peirsol, Brendan Hansen, Ian Crocker and Jason Lezak	United States
silver medal	Tomomi Morita, Kosuke Kitajima, Ryo Takayasu and Takamitsu Kojima	Japan
bronze medal	Matt Welsh, Brenton Rickard, Andrew Lauterstein and Eamon Sullivan	Australia

The men's 4 × 100 metre medley relay competition at the 2006 Pan Pacific Swimming Championships took place on August 20 at the Saanich Commonwealth Place. The last champion was the United States.

== Records ==
Prior to this competition, the existing world and Pan Pacific records were as follows:

World record	United States (USA); Aaron Peirsol (53.45); Brendan Hansen (59.37); Ian Crocker (50.28); Jason Lezak (47.58)	3:30.68	Athens, Greece	August 21, 2004
Pan Pacific Championships record	United States (USA); Aaron Peirsol (54.17); Brendan Hansen (1:00.14); Michael Phelps (51.13); Jason Lezak (48.04)	3:33.48	Yokohama, Japan	August 29, 2002

== Results ==
All times are in minutes and seconds.

KEY:	q	Fastest non-qualifiers	Q	Qualified	CR	Championships record	NR	National record	PB	Personal best	SB	Seasonal best

=== Final ===
This event was a timed-final with two heats. The final was held on August 20, at 20:40.

Rank	Heat	Lane	Name	Nationality	Time	Notes
1st place, gold medalist(s)	2	4	Aaron Peirsol (53.74); Brendan Hansen (59.18); Ian Crocker (50.92); Jason Lezak (47.95)	United States	3:31.79	CR
2nd place, silver medalist(s)	2	3	Tomomi Morita (54.41); Kosuke Kitajima (59.79); Ryo Takayasu (52.27); Takamitsu Kojima (49.23)	Japan	3:35.70	
3rd place, bronze medalist(s)	2	5	Matt Welsh (54.98); Brenton Rickard (1:00.03); Andrew Lauterstein (52.62); Eamon Sullivan (48.52)	Australia	3:36.15	
4	2	6	Matt Rose (57.02); Michael Brown (1:01.71); Joe Bartoch (52.78); Brent Hayden (48.25)	Canada	3:39.76	
5	2	2	Gerhard Zandberg (56.07); William Diering (1:02.18); Lyndon Ferns (52.50); Roland Schoeman (49.33)	South Africa	3:40.08	
6	2	7	John Zulch (57.87); Glenn Snyders (1:01.81); Moss Burmester (53.44); Corney Swanepoel (50.40)	New Zealand	3:43.52	
7	1	4	Lucas Salatta (57.62); Henrique Barbosa (1:03.08); Gabriel Mangabeira (54.83); César Cielo (49.25)	Brazil	3:44.78	
8	1	3	Yuan Ping (1:01.43); Chiang Hsin-Hung (1:04.13); Hsu Chi-chieh (57.31); Tsai Kuo-Chuan (55.98)	Chinese Taipei	3:58.85	
-	1	5	Lee Seung-Hyeon (57.79); Sin Su-Jong (-); Chung Yong (-); Lim Nam-Gyun (-)	South Korea	DSQ	
