= 2002 Pan Pacific Swimming Championships – Men's 100 metre backstroke =

Men's 100 metre backstroke at the 2002 Pan Pacific Swimming Championships
- Venue: Yokohama International Swimming Pool
- Dates: August 25, 2002 (heats & semifinals); August 26, 2002 (final)
- Competitors: 23 from 10 nations
- Winning time: 54.22

Medalists
gold medal	Aaron Peirsol	United States
silver medal	Randall Bal	United States
bronze medal	Tomomi Morita	Japan

The men's 100 metre backstroke competition at the 2002 Pan Pacific Swimming Championships took place on August 25–26 at the Yokohama International Swimming Pool. The last champion was Lenny Krayzelburg of US.

This race consisted of two lengths of the pool, all in backstroke.

== Records ==
Prior to this competition, the existing world and Pan Pacific records were as follows:

World record	Lenny Krayzelburg (USA)	53.60	Sydney, Australia	August 24, 1999
Pan Pacific Championships record	Lenny Krayzelburg (USA)	53.60	Sydney, Australia	August 24, 1999

== Results ==
All times are in minutes and seconds.

KEY:	q	Fastest non-qualifiers	Q	Qualified	CR	Championships record	NR	National record	PB	Personal best	SB	Seasonal best

=== Heats ===
The first round was held on August 25.

Rank	Heat	Lane	Name	Nationality	Time	Notes
1	1	4	Randall Bal	United States	54.53	Q
2	3	4	Aaron Peirsol	United States	54.91	Q
3	1	5	Atsushi Nishikori	Japan	55.54	Q
4	3	5	Peter Marshall	United States	55.59	Q
5	2	5	Tomomi Morita	Japan	55.78	Q
6	2	4	Matt Welsh	Australia	55.84	Q
7	2	3	Riley Janes	Canada	56.04	Q
8	1	3	Ethan Rolff	Australia	56.49	Q
9	2	6	Leigh McBean	Australia	56.54	Q
10	3	3	Raymond Hunt	United States	56.61	Q
11	1	2	Takashi Nakano	Japan	56.78	Q
12	3	7	Luke Wagner	United States	56.89	Q
13	2	2	Naoya Sonoda	Japan	56.94	Q
14	3	6	Yu Rui	China	57.02	Q
15	1	7	Cléber Costa	Brazil	57.40	Q
16	3	2	Gord Veldman	Canada	57.50	Q
17	2	7	Scott Talbot	New Zealand	57.56	
18	3	1	Thiago Pinto	Brazil	57.58	
19	1	6	Cameron Gibson	New Zealand	58.29	
20	3	8	Ian Crocker	United States	58.94	
21	1	1	Michael Galindo	Puerto Rico	59.12	
22	2	1	Mun Yew Gerald Koh	Singapore	1:00.04	
23	2	8	Seung Gin Lee	Northern Mariana Islands	1:07.43	
-	1	8	Enkhmandakb Khurlee	Mongolia	DNS	

=== Semifinals ===
The semifinals were held on August 25.

Rank	Heat	Lane	Name	Nationality	Time	Notes
1	2	4	Randall Bal	United States	54.24	Q
2	1	4	Aaron Peirsol	United States	54.31	Q
3	1	5	Peter Marshall	United States	55.02	Q
4	2	5	Atsushi Nishikori	Japan	55.75	Q
5	2	6	Riley Janes	Canada	55.83	Q
6	2	3	Tomomi Morita	Japan	55.89	Q
7	2	2	Leigh McBean	Australia	56.02	Q
8	1	2	Raymond Hunt	United States	56.12	Q
9	2	1	Yu Rui	China	56.44	
10	1	6	Ethan Rolff	Australia	56.46	
11	2	7	Takashi Nakano	Japan	56.69	
12	1	7	Naoya Sonoda	Japan	56.81	
13	2	8	Gord Veldman	Canada	57.08	
14	1	1	Cléber Costa	Brazil	57.13	
15	1	8	Scott Talbot	New Zealand	57.40	
-	1	3	Matt Welsh	Australia	DSQ	

=== Final ===
The final was held on August 26.

Rank	Lane	Name	Nationality	Time	Notes
1st place, gold medalist(s)	5	Aaron Peirsol	United States	54.22	
2nd place, silver medalist(s)	4	Randall Bal	United States	54.45	
3rd place, bronze medalist(s)	2	Tomomi Morita	Japan	55.29	
4	3	Atsushi Nishikori	Japan	55.30	
5	6	Riley Janes	Canada	55.63	
6	7	Leigh McBean	Australia	55.71	
7	8	Ethan Rolff	Australia	56.51	
8	1	Yu Rui	China	56.55	
