= Global Water Foundation =

South African-based nonprofit organization

- Formation: 2005; 21 years ago
- Founder: Johan Kriek
- Legal status: 501(c)(3)
- Headquarters: Johannesburg
- Location: United States, South Africa
- Key people: Johan Kriek (founder, international director)
- Website: www.globalwaterfoundation.org

The Global Water Foundation (GWF) is a non-profit organisation concerned with delivering clean water and sanitation to needy communities. Retired professional tennis player Johan Kriek founded the organisation in 2005 after attending meetings of the World Economic Forum in Cape Town, South Africa. The goals of the GWF echo the Millennium Development Goals established at the United Nations' Millennium Summit in September 2000.

Headquartered in Johannesburg, South Africa, with offices in Sarasota, Florida, and Raleigh, North Carolina, in the United States, the GWF's goal is to raise public awareness, contribute technical assistance and fund programs to improve water quality and provide adequate sanitation in schools, rural areas and other communities across developing nations.

== Overview ==
The Global Water Foundation was set up as a charitable trust with the exclusive purpose of the trust being to raise public awareness, provide technical assistance, support knowledge sharing, support technical innovation and research and facilitate the provision of humanitarian aid throughout the developing world, with the ultimate goal of providing safe, healthy, drinking water and adequate sanitation in areas where it is not available or where accessibility and water supply have been compromised.

== Projects ==
The GWF completed their first project in 2006 in the Kamuli District in eastern Uganda. The GWF addressed grave water problems at the 983-student Ndolwa Parents School in the town of Budiope, northeast of the capital. The project was so successful that it quickly expanded outward from the school grounds and today serves the surrounding area of 15,000 people with clean water.

The GWF worked with skilled contractors and members of the community to drill a borehole and install a Mono Pumps Solar Pumping System. This self-contained system stores water in a 2,600 gallon holding tank and is solar-powered, providing maximum water output without relying on fuel that drives up costs. The funds needed to drill the borehole and install the solar pump were approximately US$50,000.

To raise funds for this project, the GWF teamed up with the International Tennis Group (ITG) and the Rotary Club of Naples to host an Ecuadorian Evening during the Association of Tennis Professionals ATP Challenger Series on 28 April 2007 at the Naples Tennis Club. Mayor of Manta Jorge Zambrano attended the event, which featured a dinner of Ecuadorian fare and live and silent auctions.

The project is currently underway and expected to complete work by early 2008.

== Awareness ==
In addition to the GWF's Web site, the organisation opened a Virtual Education Center in the online community Second Life. The Virtual Education Center showcases photos from the GWF's work in Uganda, as well as, important facts about water. The office is complete with a sitting area and free GWF T-shirts for visitors.

== Celebrity ambassadors ==
Celebrities who have become ambassadors for the GWF include:

- Amanda Beard
- Jim Courier
- Kevin Curren
- Janet Evans
- Brendan Hansen
- Cullen Jones
- Tara Kirk
- Henri LeConte
- John McEnroe
- Martina Navratilova
- Aaron Peirsol
- Kate Ziegler
