= Woon Sui Kut =

Woon Sui Kut 温瑞吉
- Born: 31 May 1929
- Died: December 21, 2013 (aged 84); Singapore
- Occupation: Sports Official (Swimming)
- Years active: 1964 - 2013
- Awards: 1998: Trophy for Sports Ethics, International Olympic Committee

Woon Sui Kut (Chinese: 温瑞吉; pinyin: Wēn Ruì Jí) was one of Singapore's longest-serving veteran swimming officials and a known figure in the international sporting arena. He was formerly a teacher at Victoria School.

Woon had officiated in numerous swimming events, including 10 Olympic swimming events in his lifetime. Woon served as the Secretary-General of the Singapore Swimming Association from 1964 - 1999, and as Vice-President of the Asian Swimming Federation (AASF), and a member of the international swimming body, Fédération Internationale de Natation[ (FINA). He was also known in the local swimming fraternity as "the Father of Swimming, Technical Officiating, Life Saving, Diving and Water Polo"

He was removed as an official from the 2004 Summer Olympics after signing off on a judge's report that failed to provide a reason for the disqualification of Aaron Peirsol in the 200 metre backstroke final.

Woon died at Changi General Hospital on 21 December 2013, at 4.34pm. He had died from complications after a fall at home a day before, and four days after returning from his officiating work at the 2013 Southeast Asian Games in Myanmar.
