= Aaron Peirsol =

American swimmer (born 1983)

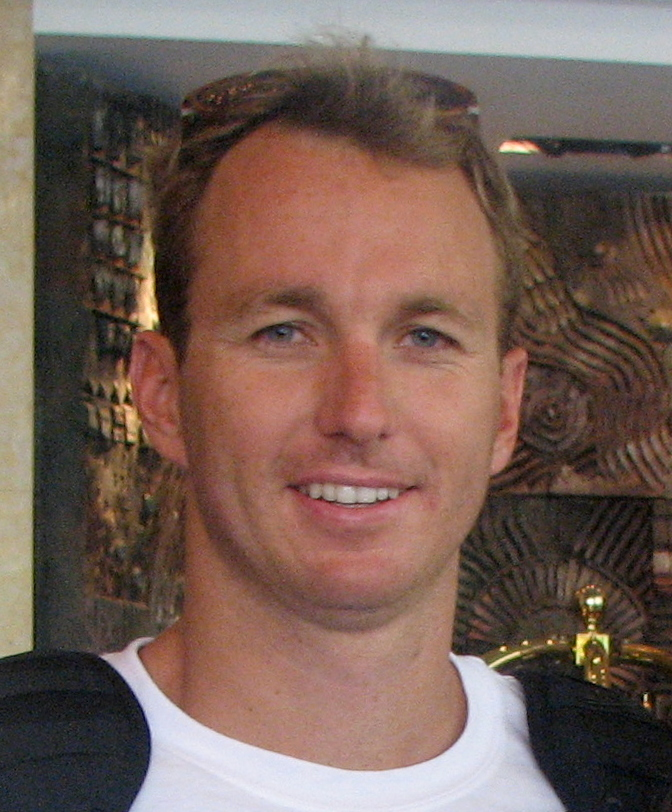
- Peirsol in 2008

Personal information
- Full name: Aaron Wells Peirsol
- National team: United States
- Born: July 23, 1983 (age 43) Irvine, California, U.S.
- Height: 6 ft 3 in (191 cm)
- Weight: 201 lb (91 kg)

Sport
- Sport: Swimming
- Strokes: Backstroke
- Club: Irvine Novaquatics; Longhorn Aquatics
- College team: University of Texas (UT)
- Coach: Dave Salo, Brian Pajer (Novaquatics); Eddie Reese, Kris Kubik (UT)
Medal record
Men's swimming
Representing the United States
Event	1st	2nd	3rd
Olympic Games	5	2	0
World Championships (LC)	10	2	0
World Championships (SC)	6	1	1
Pan Pacific Championships	8	0	0
Pan American Games	0	1	0
Total	29	6	1
Olympic Games
Gold medal – first place	2004 Athens	100 m backstroke
Gold medal – first place	2004 Athens	200 m backstroke
Gold medal – first place	2004 Athens	4×100 m medley
Gold medal – first place	2008 Beijing	100 m backstroke
Gold medal – first place	2008 Beijing	4×100 m medley
Silver medal – second place	2000 Sydney	200 m backstroke
Silver medal – second place	2008 Beijing	200 m backstroke
World Championships (LC)
Gold medal – first place	2001 Fukuoka	200 m backstroke
Gold medal – first place	2003 Barcelona	100 m backstroke
Gold medal – first place	2003 Barcelona	200 m backstroke
Gold medal – first place	2003 Barcelona	4×100 m medley
Gold medal – first place	2005 Montreal	100 m backstroke
Gold medal – first place	2005 Montreal	200 m backstroke
Gold medal – first place	2005 Montreal	4×100 m medley
Gold medal – first place	2007 Melbourne	100 m backstroke
Gold medal – first place	2009 Rome	200 m backstroke
Gold medal – first place	2009 Rome	4×100 m medley
Silver medal – second place	2003 Barcelona	4×200 m freestyle
Silver medal – second place	2007 Melbourne	200 m backstroke
World Championships (SC)
Gold medal – first place	2002 Moscow	200 m backstroke
Gold medal – first place	2002 Moscow	4×100 m freestyle
Gold medal – first place	2002 Moscow	4×100 m medley
Gold medal – first place	2004 Indianapolis	100 m backstroke
Gold medal – first place	2004 Indianapolis	200 m backstroke
Gold medal – first place	2004 Indianapolis	4×100 m medley
Silver medal – second place	2002 Moscow	100 m backstroke
Bronze medal – third place	2002 Moscow	4×200 m freestyle
Pan Pacific Championships
Gold medal – first place	2002 Yokohama	100 m backstroke
Gold medal – first place	2002 Yokohama	200 m backstroke
Gold medal – first place	2002 Yokohama	4×100 m medley
Gold medal – first place	2006 Victoria	100 m backstroke
Gold medal – first place	2006 Victoria	200 m backstroke
Gold medal – first place	2006 Victoria	4×100 m medley
Gold medal – first place	2010 Irvine	100 m backstroke
Gold medal – first place	2010 Irvine	4×100 m medley
Pan American Games
Silver medal – second place	1999 Winnipeg	200 m backstroke

Aaron Wells Peirsol (born July 23, 1983) is an American former competition swimmer and backstroke specialist who swam for the University of Texas and is a former world champion and world record-holder. He is a three-time Olympian and seven-time Olympic medalist with five gold, and two silver medals. Individually, he has held the world record in the 100-meter backstroke event and is the current record holder in the 200-meter backstroke (long course). In his long career, Peirsol captured a total of thirty-six medals in major international competition: twenty-nine gold, six silver, and one bronze spanning the Olympics, the World, Pan American, and the Pan Pacific Championships.

== Early life and swimming ==
Peirsol was born July 23, 1983 in Newport Beach, a suburb of Irvine, California, the son of Scott and Wella Peirsol. His younger sister, Hayley, was also a competitive swimmer. In 2003, Peirsol and his sister became the first sibling duo to medal at the same FINA World Championships. He attended Irvine's Venado Middle School, and was a 2002 graduate of Newport Harbor High School in Newport Beach, California. He began swim training at the age of five, eventually competing at the nearby Newport-Costa Mesa YMCA where he came under the direction of Coach Stacy Zapolski. Zapolski was a four-year competitor for Pepperdine University's women's swim team where she specialized in backstroke, and from 1991-1992 coached Peirsol, likely improving his backstroke technique. By eight, he participated in a competitive summer swim league that included water polo with Coach Ted Bandaruk in Corona del Mar. Bandaruk, who was a Professor at Orange Coast College, where Dave Salo would coach, was aquatics director and coached a large age-group swim team currently known as the Harbor View Swim Team Dolphins at the Harbor View Community Association, from 1978-2014.

=== Irvine Novaquatics ===
By 12, Peirsol's most intensive training was with the Irvine Novaquatics under Hall of Fame Coach Dave Salo, with more frequent training from youth and age group Coach Brian Pajer. Through July, 1996, Peirsol held an age group record for ten and under boys in the 100-meter backstroke of 1:12.13. Swimming at 12 for the Novaquatics at Golden West College on July 14, 1996, Peirsol set the national age group record for Boys 11-12 in the 100-meter backstroke with a time 1:03.6. At 14, on August 6, 1997, Peirsol broke the national age-group record for the 200-meter backstroke with a time of 2:05.42 at the Juniors West Championship at Clovis West High School. Not having yet reached his full potential at 14, Peirsol placed sixth in the 100 backstroke with a time of 59.32 at the U.S. Junior West National Championships on August 8, 1997 at Clovis West High.

=== University of Texas ===
Peirsol swam for the University of Texas at Austin in the Big 12 Conference under Hall of Fame Coach Eddie Reese and Associate Coach Kris Kubik. Swimming for Texas, he was the NCAA 2003 and 2004 backstroke champion, and was the 2003 NCAA Swimmer of the Year. He graduated Texas in 2006, majoring in Political Science.

== Life outside swimming ==
After finishing his second year of collegiate eligibility, Peirsol signed with Nike, Inc., thus turning professional.

Peirsol is involved in a number of charities, and has served as an ambassador for the Global Water Foundation and the Surfrider Foundation. He has also served as a spokesman for Oceana, an organization that addresses international ocean conservation. He is also a spokesman for Oceana, which is the largest international ocean conservation and advocacy organization.

== 2000 Sydney Olympics ==
Peirsol qualified for his first Olympics at the age of seventeen after finishing second to Lenny Krayzelburg in the 200-meter backstroke at the 2000 U.S. Olympic Team Trials. At the finals of the Sydney Olympics, Peirsol won a silver medal in the 200 meter backstroke finals with a time of 1:57.35, taking a close second to Lenny Krazelburg's 1:56.76 who took the gold medal. Peirsol also competed in the 100-meter backstroke, but did not qualify for the event finals.

At the finals of the Sydney Olympics, Peirsol finished second in the 200-meter backstroke with a time of 1:57.35 finishing second to rival Lenny Krayzelburg who took the gold with a 1:56.76.

=== 2001-2002 ===
At the 2001 National Championships, with Krayzelburg not competing, Peirsol qualified for the 2001 World Aquatics Championships in Fukuoka, Japan, in the 100-meter backstroke, the 200-meter backstroke, and the 4×100-meter medley relay. Peirsol's time in the 200-meter backstroke was the second-fastest ever, with only Krayzelburg's world record faster. At the 2001 World Aquatics Championships, Peirsol won gold in the 200-meter backstroke with a time of 1:57.13, a championship record.

Peirsol started off 2002 with the first world record of his career in the 200-meter backstroke, bettering Krayzelburg's mark set in 1999. In his first major competition of 2002, Peirsol won five medals (three gold, one silver, one bronze) at the 2002 FINA World Swimming Championships (25 m) in Moscow. In Moscow, he was a part of the American team that broke the world record in the 4×100-meter medley relay and he broke the 200-meter backstroke world record. At the 2002 Pan Pacific Swimming Championships in Yokohama, Japan, Peirsol won gold in the 100 and 200-meter backstroke and the 4×100-meter medley relay. Combined with Brendan Hansen, Michael Phelps, and Jason Lezak, Peirsol set the world record in the 4×100-meter medley relay to break the previous record set in 2000.

=== 2003 World Championships ===
At the 2003 World Aquatics Championships in Barcelona, Spain, Peirsol won gold in the 100 and 200-meter backstroke and the 4×100-meter medley relay. He also won a silver medal in the 4×200-meter freestyle relay. In his first event, the 100-meter backstroke, Peirsol won gold in a time of 53.61, a championship record. His time was just 0.01 s off Lenny Krayzelburg's world record. Peirsol participated in the 4×200-meter freestyle relay with Michael Phelps, Nate Dusing, and Klete Keller to win silver behind Australia. Peirsol then competed in the 200-meter backstroke and won gold in a time of 1:55.92, almost two seconds ahead of second-place finisher Gordan Kožulj of Croatia.

Peirsol competed in the 50-meter backstroke and the 4×100-meter medley relay. In the 50-meter backstroke, Peirsol finished out of medal contention with an 8th-place finish. In his last event, Peirsol competed in the 4×100-meter medley relay with Brendan Hansen, Ian Crocker, and Jason Lezak. The final time of 3:31.54 was a new world record, bettering the old mark from 2002.

== 2004 Athens Olympics ==
=== 2004 Olympic trials ===
At the 2004 U.S. Olympic Team Trials, Peirsol won individual titles in the 100 and 200-meter backstroke. Four years after finishing in 4th place at the 2000 U.S. Olympic Team Trials, Peirsol won the 100-meter backstroke title, beating Lenny Krayzelburg. Peirsol was the only individual in the field to break 54 seconds and was just off Krayzelburg's world record.

In the 200-meter backstroke, Peirsol won in a world record time of 1:54.74, bettering his previous record of 1:55.15 set in 2002. He beat his closest competitor, Michael Phelps, by more than a second.

=== 2004 Olympic finals ===
At the 2004 Summer Olympics in Athens, Greece, Peirsol won gold in the 100 and 200-meter backstroke, sweeping the backstroke events, and also took gold in the Men's 4×100-meter medley relay.

In his first event, the 100-meter backstroke, Peirsol won gold in a time of 54.06, 0.29 s ahead of second-place finisher Markus Rogan of Austria. In his second event, the 200-meter backstroke, Peirsol won gold in an Olympic record time of 1:54.95 and completed a clean sweep of the backstroke events. Rogan again finished second to Peirsol, 2.40 s back. An initial disqualification alleged that Peirsol had made an illegal turn during the 200-meter backstroke race. Having been improperly entered, the disqualification was eventually overturned. In his last event, the 4×100-meter medley relay, Peirsol combined with Brendan Hansen, Ian Crocker, and Jason Lezak to win gold in a world record time of 3:30.68, 2.94 s ahead of second-place finisher Germany. While leading off the relay, Peirsol broke the world record in the 100-meter backstroke with a time of 53.45, bettering Krayzelburg's time of 53.60 set in 1999.

Peirsol caused minor controversy when he accused Kosuke Kitajima of Japan of using an illegal dolphin kick in the 100-meter breaststroke final when compatriot Brendan Hansen lost by 0.17 s.

=== 2004 FINA Short Course World Championships ===
Shortly after the 2004 Summer Olympics, Peirsol competed at the 2004 FINA World Swimming Championships (25 m) in Indianapolis where he won three gold medals. His first gold medal came in the 100-meter backstroke in a time of 50.72, a new championship record. Three days later, Peirsol competed in the 200-meter backstroke and the 4×100-meter medley relay. In the 200-meter backstroke, Peirsol won gold in a world record time of 1:50.52, bettering his old mark of 1:50.64 (set earlier in 2004) and finished 2.02 s ahead of Matt Welsh of Australia. Peirsol then competed in the 4×100-meter medley relay with Brendan Hansen, Ian Crocker, and Jason Lezak to win gold in a world record time of 3:25.09, 4.63 s ahead of Australia. Peirsol also competed in the 50-meter backstroke but finished out of medal contention.

=== 2005 World Championships ===
At the 2005 World Championship Trials, the selection meet for the 2005 World Aquatics Championships, Peirsol won individual titles in the 100 and 200-meter backstroke. In the 100-meter backstroke, Peirsol won and broke his own world record with a time of 53.17, bettering his time of 53.45 set in Athens. In the 200-meter backstroke, Peirsol easily won with a time of 1:55.13.

At the 2005 World Aquatics Championships in Montreal, Quebec, Peirsol won gold in the 100 and 200-meter backstroke and the 4×100-meter medley relay. In his first event, the 100-meter backstroke, Peirsol won gold in a time of 53.62, just 0.01 s off his championship record set two years earlier in Barcelona. For his second event, the 200-meter backstroke, Peirsol won in dominating fashion. His time of 1:54.66 was a new world record and 1.97 s ahead of second-place finisher Markus Rogan. Peirsol then competed in the 4×100-meter medley relay with Brendan Hansen, Ian Crocker, and Jason Lezak to win gold in a time of 3:31.85, 3.23 s ahead of second-place finisher Russia. Peirsol also competed in the 50-meter backstroke but finished out of medal contention.

=== 2006 Pan Pacific Championships ===
At the 2006 National Championships, the selection meet for the 2006 Pan Pacific Swimming Championships and the 2007 World Aquatics Championships, Peirsol won individual titles in the 100 and 200-meter backstroke. At the 2006 Pan Pacific Swimming Championships in Victoria, British Columbia, Peirsol won gold in the 100 and 200-meter backstroke and the 4×100-meter medley relay. In his first event, the 100-meter backstroke, Peirsol won gold in a championship record time of 53.32. Peirsol was the only individual in the field to break 54 seconds and beat his closest competitor, Ryan Lochte, by 0.70 s. Peirsol earned his second gold in the 200-meter backstroke with a world record time of 1:54.44, bettering his previous mark of 1:54.66 set last year in Montreal. At the time, Peirsol held nine of the fastest times posted in the event and defeated second-place finisher Michael Phelps by 2.37 s. Peirsol then competed in the 4×100-meter medley relay with Brendan Hansen, Ian Crocker, and Jason Lezak to win gold in a time of 3:31.79, a new championship record.

=== 2007 World Championships ===
At the 2007 World Aquatics Championships in Melbourne, Australia, Peirsol won one gold and one silver medal. In his first event, the 100-meter backstroke, Peirsol won gold in a world record time of 52.98, bettering his time of 53.17 set in 2005. Peirsol became the first man in the event to go under 53 seconds and beat Ryan Lochte by 0.52 s. At the time, Peirsol held five of the fastest times posted in the event. At one point during the first 50-meters, Peirsol was a full meter behind Ryan Lochte, and at the turn, Peirsol was in third place behind Liam Tancock and Lochte. But Peirsol had a superior finish to over-take both swimmers. After the race, Peirsol thanked Lochte for the fast start, which he attributed to the world record. In the 200-meter backstroke, Peirsol placed second to Lochte and lost his world record he set in 2006. Throughout the race, Peirsol was in first and at the 150-meter mark, Peirsol was ahead of Lochte 1:24.56 to 1:25.05. But Lochte had a strong finish to over-take Peirsol for the win. For Peirsol, it was his first international loss in the event since the 2000 Summer Olympics. Peirsol did not have a chance to swim in the 4×100-meter medley relay final because the United States was disqualified in the heats.

== 2008 Beijing Olympics ==
=== 2008 Olympic trials ===
At the 2008 U.S. Olympic Team Trials, Peirsol won individual titles in the 100 and 200-meter backstroke, repeating his results from the 2004 U.S. Olympic Team Trials. In his first event, the 100-meter backstroke, Peirsol won ahead of Matt Grevers with a world record time of 52.89, lowering his previous mark of 52.98 set last year. In his second event, the 200-meter backstroke, Peirsol won in a time of 1:54.32, equalling Ryan Lochte's world record set last year. Lochte finished a close second, just 0.02 s behind Peirsol.

=== 2008 Olympic finals ===
At the finals of the 2008 Summer Olympics in Beijing, China, Peirsol won gold in the 100-meter backstroke and the 4×100-meter medley relay. He also won silver in the 200-meter backstroke. In his first event, the 100-meter backstroke, Peirsol was the heavy favorite for gold, with him being the world-record holder and the defending Olympic champion. For the final of the 100-meter backstroke, Peirsol was swimming in lane two, having qualified fifth in the semi-finals. At the first 50-meters in the 100-meter backstroke final, Peirsol was in second place behind Liam Tancock, who took it out in 25.11. Peirsol was 0.54 s behind Tancock at the turn. However, after the turn, Peirsol overtook Tancock, who eventually placed sixth, and won the gold. Peirsol's final time of 52.54 was a new world record, bettering his previous mark of 52.89 set last month. After the race, Peirsol said, "I'm a little bit excited, a little bit relieved, absolutely elated." In his second event, the 200-meter backstroke, Peirsol placed second to Ryan Lochte 1:54.33 to 1:53.94. In winning the gold, Lochte broke the world record tie he and Peirsol shared in the 200-meter backstroke. In his last event, the 4×100-meter medley relay, Peirsol combined with Brendan Hansen, Michael Phelps, and Jason Lezak to win gold in a world record time of 3:29.34, lowering the old mark of 3:30.68 set four years ago in Athens.

=== 2009 World Championships ===
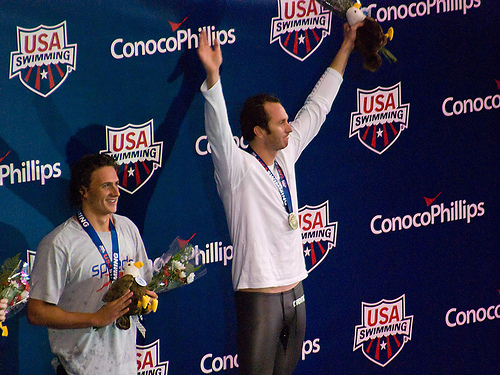
Peirsol (right) after his victory in the 200 m backstroke at the 2009 National Championships. Ryan Lochte here stands at the 2nd place.

At the 2009 National Championships, the selection meet for the 2009 World Aquatics Championships, Peirsol won individual titles in the 100- and 200-meter backstroke. In his first event, the 100-meter backstroke, Peirsol won in a time of 51.94, reclaiming the world record from Aschwin Wildeboer. In winning the 100-meter backstroke, Peirsol became the first person to swim the event in under 52 seconds and it was the sixth time he set the world record in the event. In the 200-meter backstroke, Peirsol defeated Ryan Lochte and reclaimed the 200-meter backstroke world record he lost in Beijing. Peirsol also competed in the 100-meter butterfly but did not qualify for the event in Rome, finishing in third place.

At the 2009 World Aquatics Championships in Rome, Peirsol won two gold medals. In his first event, the 100-meter backstroke, Peirsol surprised many after he failed to make the final, which he attributed to a miscalculation of his own position in the semi-finals. Peirsol said, "I thought I was going faster. I am very disappointed. I completely misjudged my race. I have to go on, pick myself up and focus on my next events." But Peirsol's world record in the 100-meter backstroke would stay in place after the final. In his second event, the 200-meter backstroke, Peirsol won the gold in a time of 1:51.92, breaking his own world record of 1:53.08 by more than a second. Peirsol then competed in the 50-meter backstroke but did not advance past the heats. In his last event, the 4×100-meter medley relay, Peirsol combined with Eric Shanteau, Michael Phelps, and David Walters to win gold in a world record time of 3:27.28, lowering the old mark of 3:29.34 set a year ago in Beijing. While leading off the relay, Peirsol broke the championship record in the 100-meter backstroke with a time of 52.19, bettering the previous mark of 52.26 set by Junya Koga.

=== 2010 ===
At the 2010 National Championships, Peirsol placed second in both the 100- and 200-meter backstroke. In the 100-meter backstroke, Peirsol placed second to David Plummer, who touched just 0.03 s ahead. For Peirsol, it was his first loss in the 100-meter backstroke at a national championships since he placed 4th at the 2000 U.S. Olympic Team Trials. In the 200-meter backstroke, Peirsol placed second to Ryan Lochte, who finished 0.70 s ahead.

At the 2010 Pan Pacific Swimming Championships in Irvine, California, Peirsol won gold in the 100-meter backstroke and the 4×100-meter medley relay. Peirsol's first gold came in the 100-meter backstroke. Initially, Peirsol did not qualify to swim in the medal-awarding final because only a maximum of two swimmers from one country could enter in the finals and David Plummer and Ryan Lochte owned the top two American spots. However, Lochte withdrew from the 100-meter backstroke and as a result, Peirsol advanced to the finals. Peirsol won the gold in a time of 53.31, breaking his own championship record set in 2006. Peirsol then competed in the 200-meter backstroke but did not qualify to swim in the medal-awarding final, with Lochte and Tyler Clary taking the top two American spots. In his final event, the 4×100-meter medley relay, Peirsol won gold along with compatriots Mark Gangloff, Michael Phelps, and Nathan Adrian. This would be the last race of his international career. When the competition was over, Peirsol said he put his swimming equipment in a locker and walked away.

== Retirement ==
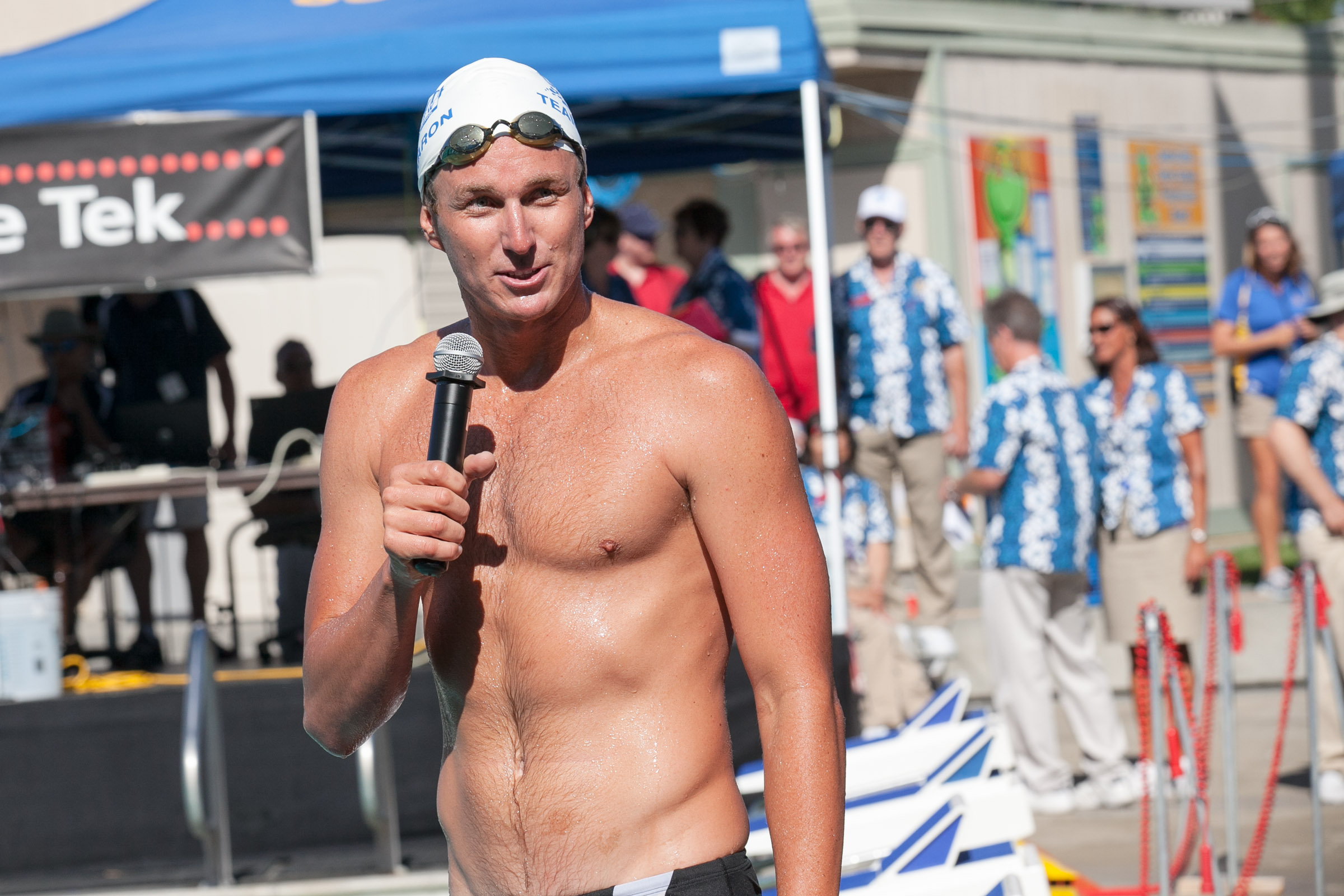
Piersol at the 2013 Santa Clara Grand Prix.

On February 2, 2011, at the age of twenty-seven, Peirsol announced that he was officially retiring from professional swimming. This ended months of speculation after he withdrew from his spots in both the 2010 FINA World Swimming Championships (25 m) in Dubai and the 2011 World Aquatics Championships in Shanghai. Peirsol said he contemplated retirement after the 2008 Summer Olympics. In 2010, he said he had no further goals and found it difficult to swim because he "ended up doing everything (he) set out to do." He added, "Things outside of the sport started to interest me." Peirsol said it was "poetic" that 2010 Pan Pacific Swimming Championships, his final competition, was held at the pool where he trained in childhood. Peirsol planned to go to graduate school at the University of Texas at Austin to study political science.

Peirsol returned to Newport Beach where he has served as a seasonal ocean lifeguard and swim coach at his alma mater, Newport Harbor High School.

== Awards and honors ==
- 2005: Golden Goggle Awards – Male Athlete of the Year
- 2005: Swimming World – American Swimmer of the Year
- 2016: International Swimming Hall of Fame inductee
- 2017: Texas Swimming & Diving Hall of Fame inductee

== See also ==
- List of multiple Olympic gold medalists
- List of multiple Olympic gold medalists at a single Games
- List of Olympic medalists in swimming (men)
- List of Olympic records in swimming
- List of University of Texas at Austin alumni
- List of World Aquatics Championships medalists in swimming (men)
- List of individual gold medalists in swimming at the Olympics and World Aquatics Championships (men)
- List of world records in swimming
- World record progression 100 metres backstroke
- World record progression 200 metres backstroke
- World record progression 4 × 100 metres medley relay

Records
Preceded by Lenny Krayzelburg; Ryan Lochte; Ryan Lochte	Men's 200-meter backstroke world record-holder (long course); March 20, 2002 – March 30, 2007; July 4, 2008 – August 15, 2008 (tied Lochte); July 11, 2009 – present	Succeeded by Ryan Lochte; Ryan Lochte; Incumbent
Preceded by Shared between Matt Welsh & Gordan Kožulj	Men's 200-meter backstroke world record-holder (short course); April 7, 2002 – December 8, 2005	Succeeded by Markus Rogan
Preceded by Lenny Krayzelburg; Aschwin Wildeboer	Men's 100-meter backstroke world record-holder (long course); August 21, 2004 – July 1, 2009; July 8, 2009 – August 13, 2016	Succeeded by Aschwin Wildeboer; Ryan Murphy
Awards
Preceded by Michael Phelps	Swimming World; American Swimmer of the Year; 2005	Succeeded by Michael Phelps
