= Randall Bal =

American swimmer (born 1980)

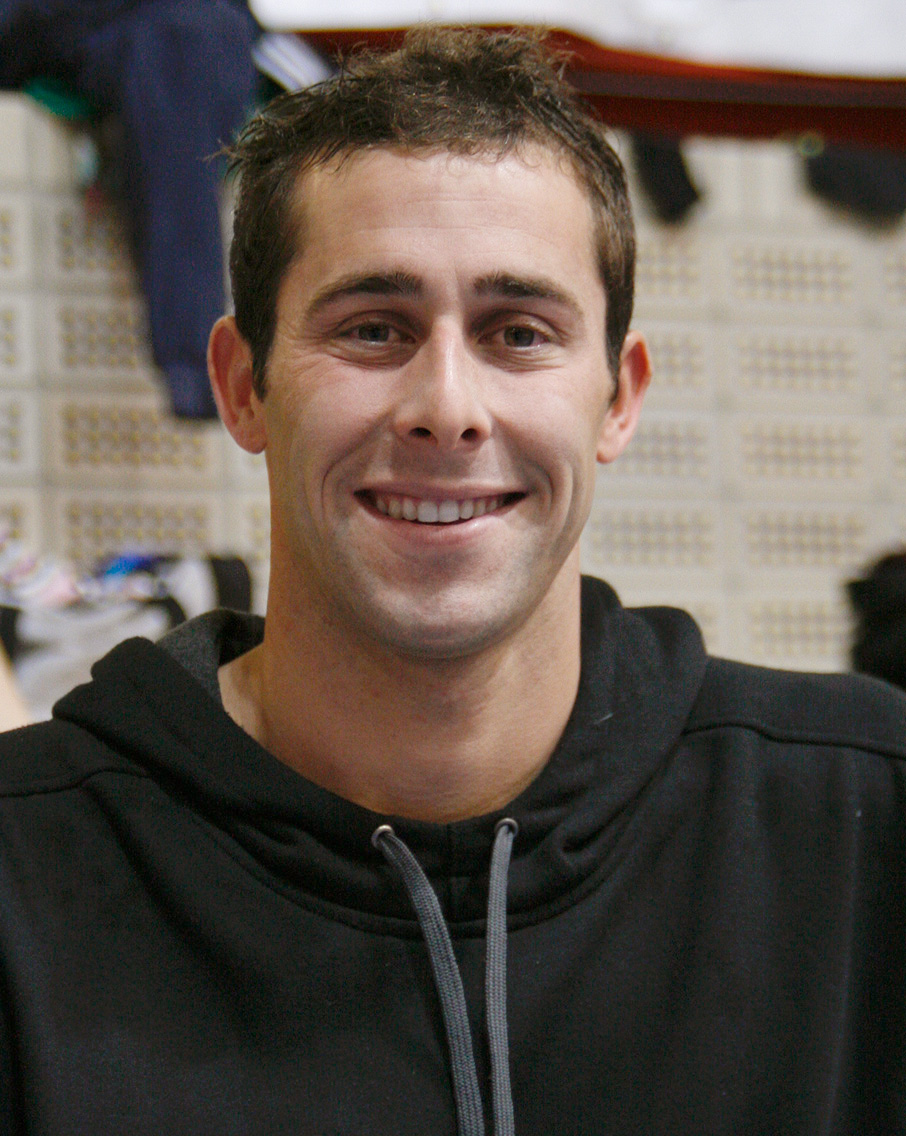
- Bal in 2008

Personal information
- Full name: Randall Bal
- Nickname: Turbo
- National team: United States
- Born: November 14, 1980 (age 45) Fair Oaks, California, U.S.
- Height: 6 ft 4 in (193 cm)
- Weight: 195 lb (88 kg)

Sport
- Sport: Swimming
- Strokes: Backstroke
- College team: Stanford University
Medal record
Men's swimming
Representing the United States
World Championships (LC)
Gold medal – first place	2001 Fukuoka	50 m backstroke
Gold medal – first place	2003 Barcelona	4×100 m medley
Gold medal – first place	2005 Montreal	4×100 m medley
Silver medal – second place	2003 Barcelona	4×100 m freestyle
Silver medal – second place	2005 Montreal	100 m backstroke
World Championships (SC)
Silver medal – second place	2006 Shanghai	4×100 m medley
Silver medal – second place	2008 Manchester	100 m backstroke
Silver medal – second place	2008 Manchester	4×100 m medley
Bronze medal – third place	2006 Shanghai	100 m backstroke
Bronze medal – third place	2006 Shanghai	4×100 m freestyle
Pan Pacific Championships
Silver medal – second place	2002 Yokohama	100 m backstroke
Pan American Games
Gold medal – first place	2007 Rio	100 m backstroke
Gold medal – first place	2007 Rio	4×100 m medley

Randall Bal (born November 14, 1980) is an American swimmer who specialized in the backstroke. He is a former world record holder in the 50-meter backstroke (long and short course).

He has won a total of thirteen medals in major international competition, five golds, six silvers, and two bronze spanning the World Championships, the Pan American Games, and the Pan Pacific Championships.

== Personal ==
Bal was born in Fair Oaks, California in 1980, the son of Adrian and Carol Bal. His younger sister, Tamara, swam at UCLA. Bal attended Bella Vista High School where he graduated in 1999. From there, he swam for Stanford University, class of 2003, and graduated with a degree in psychology.

== Swimming career ==
At the 2008 FINA Short Course World Championships in Manchester, he took the silver medal in the 100 Back, but he finished a surprising sixth (his PB would have won the event) in the 50 Back. He won another silver on the medley relay. He was the top qualifier in the 100 Back at the 2008 Olympic Trials, in both the preliminaries and semi-finals, with the then-third fastest time ever in the semis (53.09), but he faded to fourth in the finals, finishing behind Aaron Peirsol, who set a new World Record of 52.89, Matt Grevers, and Ryan Lochte. In 2008 Randall broke both the World Record (24.33 LCM & 22.87 SCM) in the 50 backstroke and missed the 100 LCM backstroke World Record by .04 of a second. He trained in northern California.

== See also ==
- List of Pan American Games records in swimming
- List of Stanford University people
- List of World Aquatics Championships medalists in swimming (men)
- World record progression 50 metres backstroke

Records
Preceded by Peter Marshall	Men's 50-meter backstroke world record-holder (short course); November 15, 2008 – October 17, 2009	Succeeded by Peter Marshall
Preceded by Liam Tancock	Men's 50-meter backstroke world record-holder (long course); December 5, 2008 – August 1, 2009	Succeeded by Liam Tancock
Sporting positions
Preceded by Ryk Neethling	Male World Cup Overall Winner; 2007	Succeeded by Cameron van der Burgh
