= Andrei Mihailov =

Moldovan swimmer

Personal information
- Full name: Andrei Mihailov
- National team: Moldova
- Born: 31 October 1980 (age 45) Tiraspol, Moldavian SSR, Soviet Union
- Height: 1.85 m (6 ft 1 in)
- Weight: 82 kg (181 lb)

Sport
- Sport: Swimming
- Strokes: Backstroke
- Club: Moldova Swimming Team

Andrei Mihailov (born October 31, 1980) is a Moldovan former swimmer, who specialized in backstroke events. He is a two-time Olympian (2000 and 2004) and a member of the Moldova Swimming Team.

Mihailov's Olympic debut came at the 2000 Summer Olympics in Sydney. Swimming in heat one of the men's 200 m backstroke, he edged out Bulgaria's Ivan Angelov to take a second spot and thirty-eighth overall by 0.63 of a second in 2:06.67.

At the 2004 Summer Olympics in Athens, Mihailov qualified again for the 200 m backstroke. He cleared a FINA B-standard entry time of 2:06.12 from the Russian Open Championships in Moscow. Swimming in the same heat as Sydney, he raced again to second place by 0.68 of a second behind Finland's Matti Mäki in 2:06.97. Mihailov failed to advance into the semifinals, as he placed thirty-fourth overall in the preliminaries.
