= Jake Tapp =

Canadian swimmer (born 1988)

Personal information
- Full name: John Bernard Tapp
- Nickname: "Jake"
- National team: Canada
- Born: August 6, 1988 (age 38) Ridgewood, New Jersey, U.S.
- Height: 1.93 m (6 ft 4 in)
- Weight: 91 kg (201 lb)

Sport
- Sport: Swimming
- Strokes: Backstroke, freestyle, medley
- Club: Langley Olympians Swim Club
- College team: University of Arizona

John Bernard Tapp (born August 6, 1988) is a Canadian former competitive swimmer and a 2008 Olympian.

He is currently the Canadian short course record-holder in the 100-metre and 200-metre backstroke events, and the 100-metre individual medley. He also held the World Record in the 4 × 100 m medley relay short course in 2009.

Tapp was a member of the 2008 Canadian Olympic team in Beijing. He tied at the Canadian Olympic Swimming Trials in Montreal in the final of the 100 backstroke, and had to win a swim-off to qualify for the Olympic team.

He attended the University of Arizona, and swam for the Arizona Wildcats men's swimming and diving team from 2006 to 2010, and was a member of the Wildcats' NCAA Championship team in 2008. Tapp held the Pacific-10 Conference record for the 200-yard backstroke from 2009 to 2014, and is a two-time NCAA Division I championship runner-up: 200-yard backstroke in 2009 to Tyler Clary, and 100-yard backstroke in 2010 to Eugene Godsoe.

Tapp was born to Canadian parents in Ridgewood, New Jersey, and was raised in Langley, British Columbia. He has one brother, Charlie, who is also a Canadian swimmer and was a member of the University of Nevada's swimming team.

== See also ==
- World record progression 4 × 100 metres medley relay
