= Pavlo Illichov =

Ukrainian swimmer

Personal information
- Full name: Pavlo Illichov
- National team: Ukraine
- Born: 24 August 1983 (age 42) Odesa, Ukrainian SSR, Soviet Union
- Height: 1.99 m (6 ft 6 in)
- Weight: 105 kg (231 lb)

Sport
- Sport: Swimming
- Strokes: Backstroke
- Club: Dynamo Odesa
- Coach: Alla Timofeyeva
Medal record
Men's swimming
Representing Ukraine
European Junior Championships
Silver medal – second place	2001 Valletta	50 m backstroke

Pavlo Illichov (Ukrainian: Павло Іллічов; born August 24, 1983) is a Ukrainian former swimmer, who specialized in backstroke events. He won a silver medal in the 50 m backstroke at the 2001 European Junior Swimming Championships in Valletta, Malta (26.81). Illichov is a member of the swimming team for Dynamo Odesa, and is trained by his longtime coach and mentor Alla Timofeyeva.

Illichov qualified only for the men's 4 × 100 m medley relay, as a member of the Ukrainian team, at the 2004 Summer Olympics in Athens. Teaming with Oleg Lisogor (breaststroke), Andriy Serdinov (butterfly), and Yuriy Yegoshin (freestyle), Illichov led off a backstroke leg with a split of 56.19, but the Ukrainians settled only for sixth place in a final time of 3:36.87, six seconds off a new world record set by the winning U.S. team.
