= Hayden Stoeckel =

Australian swimmer

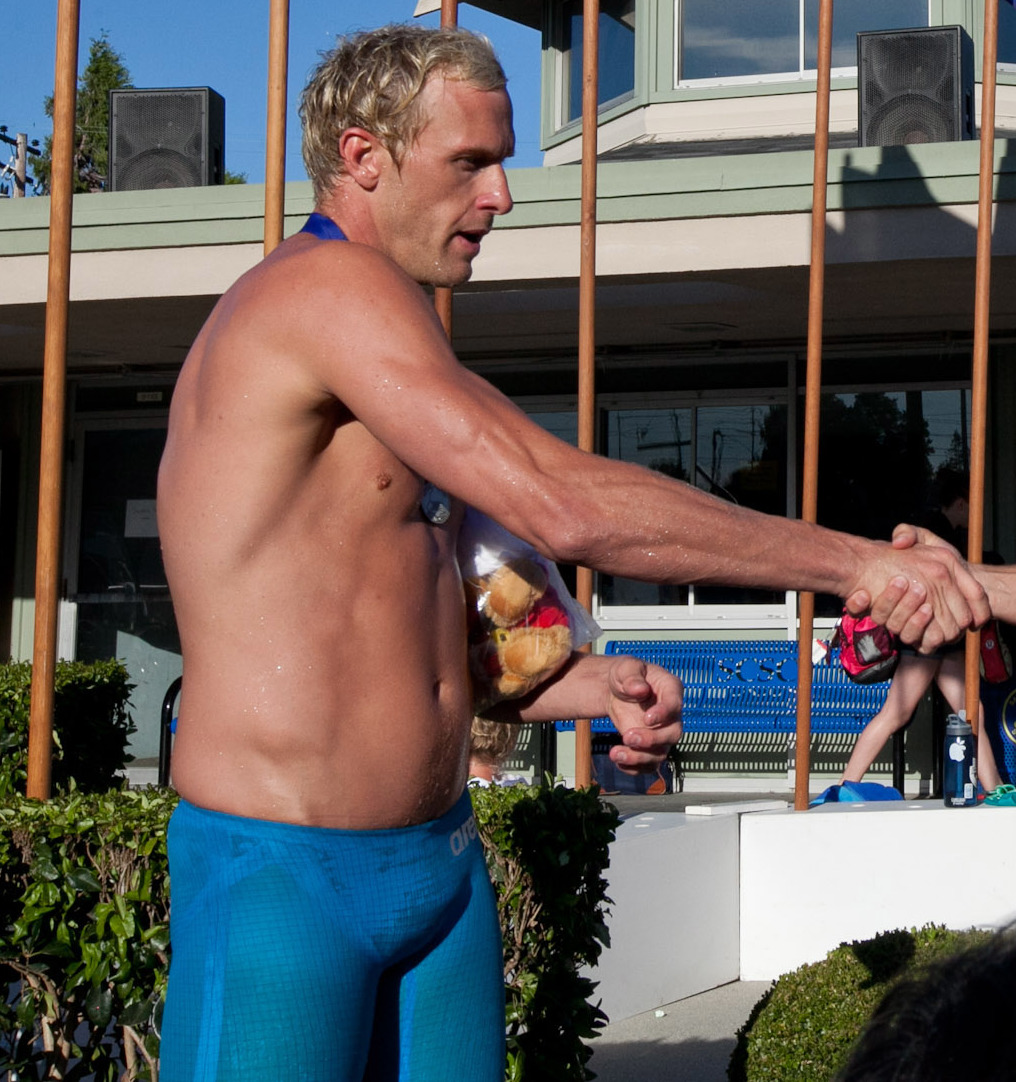
- Stoeckel in 2012

Personal information
- Full name: Hayden Ernest Stoeckel
- Nickname: bronzepuller
- National team: Australia
- Born: 10 August 1984 (age 41) Renmark, South Australia
- Height: 1.97 m (6 ft 6 in)
- Weight: 95 kg (209 lb)

Sport
- Sport: Swimming
- Strokes: Backstroke
- Club: Norwood
Medal record
Men's swimming
Representing Australia
Olympic Games
Silver medal – second place	2008 Beijing	4×100 m medley
Bronze medal – third place	2008 Beijing	100 m backstroke
Bronze medal – third place	2012 London	4×100 m medley
World Championships (LC)
Gold medal – first place	2007 Melbourne	4×100 m medley
Silver medal – second place	2011 Shanghai	4×100 m medley
Commonwealth Games
Silver medal – second place	2010 Delhi	50 m backstroke

Hayden Ernest Stoeckel (born 10 August 1984) is an Olympic and national record-holding backstroke swimmer from Australia. He swam for Australia at the 2008 Olympics where he tied with Russia's Arkady Vyatchanin for the bronze medal in the 100m backstroke; in semifinals of the event he also set a new Australian and Commonwealth Record (52.97). He was also part of the Australian men's 4×100-metre medley relay team that won bronze at the 2012 Summer Olympics.

Stoeckel is a member of South Australia's Norwood Swimming Club.

In 2006 Stoeckel moved to Brisbane to further his swimming career. He worked at the Dayboro Swimming Pool as a trainer and maintenance worker. He stated in an interview with channel Nine, that his time spent working there played a massive role in succeeding at the 2008 Beijing Summer Olympics.

Stoeckel started his swimming with the Berri Swimming Club in South Australia. The swimming pool in Berri was renamed the "Hayden Stoeckel Swimming Pool" after he won two medals at the 2008 Olympics.

At the 2007 World Championships, Stoeckel failed to advance from the preliminary heats of the 50-metre backstroke after coming 21st in a time of 26.38, failing to progress by 0.14 of a second. In the 100-metre event, he missed out on the semifinals by 0.01, placing 17th in the heats in a time of 55.64 seconds. However, one of the swimmers ahead of him withdrew from the semifinals, so he swam, finishing last in 55.51. He was eliminated in the heats of the 200-metre backstroke, finishing 24th in a time of 2:02.32. He competed in the heats of the 4×100-metre medley relay, posting the fastest backstroke leg in a time of 55.18, as Australia qualified fourth. He was dropped in favour of Matt Welsh in the final, which Australia won.

At the 2008 Australian Swimming Championships he qualified in the 100- and 200-metre backstrokes for Australia's 2008 Olympic Team, placing second and first respectively.

In the 100-metre backstroke at the 2008 Olympics, Stoeckel won his heat and was seventh fastest going into the semifinals in a time of 53.93. He won the second semifinal in a time of 52.97, setting an Olympic, Commonwealth and Australian record to qualify fastest for the final. In the final, he finished third in a time of 53.18, tying for the bronze medal. American swimmer Aaron Peirsol broke the world record in 52.54 seconds to defend his Olympic title.

Stoeckel came sixth in the 200-metre back and was part of Australia's a silver-medal winning 4×100-metre medley relay.

In early 2009, he qualified to swim at the 2009 World Championships; however, two weeks before championships he withdrew from the Australian team due to an injury.

== See also ==
- List of Commonwealth Games medallists in swimming (men)
- List of Olympic medalists in swimming (men)
