= George Du Rand =

South African swimmer (born 1982)

Personal information
- Full name: Johannes Du Rand
- Nationality: South Africa
- Born: 16 October 1982 (age 43) Bloemfontein, South Africa
- Height: 1.94 m (6 ft 4 in)

Sport
- Sport: Swimming
- Strokes: Backstroke
- College team: Tennessee (USA)
Medal record
Men's swimming
Representing South Africa
Commonwealth Games
Silver medal – second place	2006 Melbourne	200m backstroke
African Games
Gold medal – first place	2007 Algiers	200m backstroke
Silver medal – second place	1999 Johannesburg	200m backstroke

Johannes ("George") Du Rand (born 16 October 1982) is a South African swimmer. As of 2008, he is the African and South African record holder in the men's long course 200 meter backstroke. He is a member of South Africa's 2008 Olympic team.

He competed in the United States for the University of Tennessee.

Among other events, he has swum at the:

- 2006 Commonwealth Games
- 2007 World Championships
- 2008 Short Course Worlds

== See also ==
- World record progression 200 metres backstroke
