= Răzvan Florea =

Romanian swimmer (born 1980)

Personal information
- Full name: Răzvan Ionuţ Florea
- Nationality: Romania
- Born: 29 September 1980 (age 45) Constanța, Romania
- Height: 1.93 m (6 ft 4 in)
- Weight: 87 kg (192 lb)

Sport
- Sport: Swimming
- Strokes: Backstroke
Medal record
Olympic Games
Bronze medal – third place	2004 Athens	200m backstroke
European Championships
Silver medal – second place	2004 Madrid	200m backstroke
Bronze medal – third place	2006 Budapest	200m backstroke
Bronze medal – third place	2008 Eindhoven	200m backstroke
SC Europeans
Bronze medal – third place	2006 Helsinki	200m backstroke

Răzvan Florea (born 29 September 1980 in Constanța, Romania) is a former Olympic and national record setting backstroke swimmer from Romania. He was the first Romanian male to win an Olympic medal in Swimming when he won the bronze medal in the 200 backstroke at the 2004 Olympics. He also swam for Romania at the 2000 Olympics.

== Career ==
Florea began swimming at the age of six, at the Constanţa Children's Palace pool, coached by Dumitru Lungu. Due to his attraction to water and his inborn qualities (his father was a professional scuba diver), Florea overcame the drawback of being overweight and recorded a fast progress. After less than one year of swimming, he took part in his first competitions for his age group. 1987 would become his year of reference: the first year when he won a medal. In 1988, (aged 8) Florea won 11 medals in local competitions for his age group; in 1989, he won another 6 medals, and in 1990 and 1991, 21 medals, including in national competitions for 10- and 11-year-olds. The most significant results during this period were his first two national records for 50m butterfly, at age 11.

In 1995 (aged 15), he made his debut in the National Junior Swimming Team. In 1998 (aged 18) he was selected for the National and Olympic Teams. Between 1996 and 2000, he participated in over 25 major European competitions (official, unofficial and Grand Prix), winning 42 medals. His progress was constant and valuable, and he set 25 national records during this time.

One remarkable personal achievement at international level during this period was finishing sixth in the Olympic final of the 200 backstroke at the 2000 Sydney Olympics.

The next year was difficult, due to health problems, but he eventually managed to return to the international competition arena, finishing fifth at the 2002 European Championships, a sign which marked his comeback.

In 2003, he made his debut in World Cup competitions, winning his first silver medal at this level – second place in the 200 back (Stockholm, 22 January 2003). He also set a new national record in the short course 100m backstroke event as well.

In 2004, he recorded several remarkable results: he won 3 gold medals at the New York and Rio de Janeiro World Cup meets (February 2004) and he set 4 new Romanian national records. In May at the 2004 European Championships, Florea finished second in the 200 m backstroke. In the summer at the Mare Nostrum meets, he won 6 gold medals and 2 silver medals (in Monaco, Canet, Barcelona and Rome), which earned him second place in the general circuit ranking. Then at the 2004 Olympics, Florea won the bronze medal in the 200 m backstroke, also setting 2 new Romanian national records.

The next year, at the 2005 World Championships, Florea finished fourth in the 200 m backstroke, three hundreds of a second short of the bronze medal. However, his 1:57.03 time meant a new national record.

He recorded his first 2006 results at the 2005-2006 World Cup competitions in Moscow and New York, winning two bronze medals in the 200 backstroke.

By this time in his career, Răzvan Florea has won 100 Romanian National Champion titles, has set national records 57 times, and has won a total of over 293 medals, of which 77 in international competitions. He retired in 2010.

== Awards ==
- The Meritul Sportiv National Medal (sporting achievement), second class with one strap
- The Meritul Sportiv Order (sporting achievement), third class with two straps
