= Keith Beavers =

Canadian swimmer (born 1983)

Personal information
- Full name: Keith Beavers
- National team: Canada
- Born: February 9, 1983 (age 43) London, Ontario
- Height: 1.85 m (6 ft 1 in)
- Weight: 75 kg (165 lb)

Sport
- Sport: Swimming
- Strokes: Backstroke, medley
- Club: Region of Waterloo Swim Club
Medal record
Men's swimming
Representing Canada
Pan Pacific Championships
Bronze medal – third place	2002 Yokohama	200m backstroke
Pan American Games
Bronze medal – third place	2007 Rio	400 m medley

Keith Beavers (born February 9, 1983) is a backstroke and medley swimmer from Canada who represented his native country at the 2004 Summer Olympics in Athens, Greece. In 2006, at the Pan Pacific Trials, he lowered his 200-metre backstroke record to 1:58.97.

He was born in London, Ontario, and grew up in the town of Orangeville, Ontario, attending Mono and Amaranth Public School. He began his swimming career at the age of 6 with the Orangeville Otters Swim Club, where he swam to the age of 8. He then switched to the Dorado Stars Swim Club where he swam for a number of years.

In 2008, Beavers qualified for the 2008 Summer Olympics in Beijing in the 200-metre backstroke and 400-metre individual medley. Beavers was once again representing the Region of Waterloo Swim club under coach Dean Boles. He placed 7th in the 200-metre individual medley final. Beavers has announced his retirement from international competition. He is now in Kingston coaching KBM (Kingston Blue Marlins).

In 2009 Beavers received his Master of Science in Kinesiology from University of Waterloo followed by his Master of Science in Physical Therapy from Queens University in 2013. He is a practicing physiotherapist in Kingston, Ontario, Canada.

== See also ==
- List of University of Waterloo people
