= Yu Rui (swimmer) =

Chinese swimmer (born 1982)

Personal information
- Born: April 17, 1982 (age 44) Tongren, China

Sport
- Sport: Swimming
Medal record
Representing China
Summer Universiade
Bronze medal – third place	2001 Beijing	200m backstroke

Yu Rui (born 17 April 1982) is a male Olympic backstroke swimmer from China. He swam for China at the:

- Olympics: 2004
- World Championships: 2003
