= Simon Dufour =

French swimmer

Personal information
- Born: February 20, 1979 (age 47) Ambert, France

Sport
- Sport: Swimming
- Strokes: Backstroke
Medal record
Representing France
Summer Universiade
Silver medal – second place	2001 Beijing	200m backstroke
European Championships (LC)
Silver medal – second place	2004 Madrid	4x100m medley relay
European Championships (SC)
Bronze medal – third place	2001 Antwerp	200m backstroke
Mediterranean Games
Silver medal – second place	2001 Tunis	200m backstroke
Bronze medal – third place	2001 Tunis	4x200m freestyle relay
Bronze medal – third place	2001 Tunis	4x100m medley relay

Simon Dufour (born 20 February 1979) is an Olympic backstroke swimmer from France. He swam for France at:

- Olympics: 2000, 2004, 2008
- World Championships: 2003, 2005, 2007
- European Championships: 2004
- World University Games: 2001
- Mediterranean Games: 2001
- Short Course Europeans: 2001, 2006

== See also ==
- (in French) Dufour's entry on French Wikipedia
