= Gerhard Zandberg =

South African swimmer (born 1983)

Personal information
- Full name: Johannes Gerhardus Zandberg
- National team: South Africa
- Born: 23 April 1983 (age 43) Pretoria, South Africa
- Height: 2.04 m (6 ft 8 in)
- Weight: 100 kg (220 lb)

Sport
- Sport: Swimming
- Strokes: Backstroke
- Club: TuksSport
Medal record
Men's swimming
Representing South Africa
World Championships (LC)
Gold medal – first place	2007 Melbourne	50 m backstroke
Bronze medal – third place	2003 Barcelona	50 m backstroke
Bronze medal – third place	2009 Rome	50 m backstroke
Bronze medal – third place	2011 Shanghai	50 m backstroke
World Championships (SC)
Bronze medal – third place	2008 Manchester	50m freestyle
Commonwealth Games
Gold medal – first place	2006 Melbourne	4×100 m freestyle
Bronze medal – third place	2002 Manchester	50 m backstroke

Gerhard Zandberg (born 23 April 1983) is a retired Olympic swimmer from South Africa. He swam for South Africa at:

- Olympics: 2004, 2008
- World Championships: 2003, 2007, 2009, 2011
- Commonwealth Games: 2006, 2010
- African Games: 2007, 2011
- Short Course Worlds: 2008

At the 2008 Olympics, he set the African and South African records in the long course 100 Back (53.75). At the 2009 World Championships, he set the same two records in the 50 back (24.34).

== See also ==
- List of Commonwealth Games medallists in swimming (men)
