= Blaž Medvešek =

Slovenian swimmer (born 1980)

Personal information
- Full name: Blaž Medvešek
- Nationality: Slovenia
- Born: July 10, 1980 (age 46) Maribor
- Height: 1.91 m (6 ft 3 in)
- Weight: 82 kg (181 lb)

Sport
- Sport: Swimming
- Strokes: Backstroke
- Club: Plavalni Klub Ilirija
Medal record
Men's swimming
World Championships (SC)
Bronze medal – third place	2002 Moscow	200 m backstroke
European Championships (SC)
Gold medal – first place	2003 Dublin	200 m backstroke
Silver medal – second place	2004 Vienna	200 m backstroke
Bronze medal – third place	2000 Valencia	200 m backstroke
Summer Universiade
Gold medal – first place	2005 Izmir	200 m backstroke
Mediterranean Games
Gold medal – first place	2005 Almería	200 m backstroke
Gold medal – first place	2005 Almería	4×100 m medley

Blaž Medvešek (born July 10, 1980, in Maribor) is a former backstroke swimmer from Slovenia, who competed for his native country of Slovenia at the 2004 Summer Olympics in Athens, Greece as well as at 2000 Summer Olympics in Sydney, Australia. In his swimming career, he has represented Branik, Maribor and Ilirija, Ljubljana Swimming Clubs and achieved highest achievements while training in Ljubljana with coach Dimitrij Mancevič and teammate Peter Mankoč.

Blaž is still considered to be one of the most successful Slovenian swimmers of all time being finalist at all major swimming competitions including the 2004 Summer Olympics and winning numerous national titles. Furthermore, he still holds the national records in long course pools in 50 m backstroke (26.08), 100 m backstroke (54.88), and 200 m backstroke (1:58.61) as well as for short course meters pools in 100 m backstroke (52.69) and 200 m backstroke (1:52.39).

The highest achievements include (chronologically):

- 1997: European Junior Championships - 8th 100 m backstroke
- 1998: European Junior Championships - 5th 200 m backstroke, 7th 100 m backstroke
- 2000: 2004 Summer Olympics - 23rd 200 m backstroke, 32nd 100 m backstroke;European LC Championships 2000 - 9th 200 m backstroke, 12th 50 m backstroke; European SC Championships 2000 - 3rd 200 m backstroke, 4th 100 m backstroke, 6th 50 m backstroke; 2000 FINA Short Course World Championships - 11th 100 m backstroke
- 2001: 2001 World Aquatics Championships - 14th 100 m backstroke; European SC Championships 2001 - 6th 200 m backstroke, 6th 100 m backstroke, 11th 50 m backstroke; Mediterranean Games - 2nd 100 m backstroke
- 2002: European LC Championships 2002 - 8th 200 m backstroke, 13th 100 m backstroke, 13th 50 m backstroke; 2002 FINA Short Course World Championships - 3rd 200 m backstroke, 13th 50 m backstroke; European SC Championships 2000 - 9th 200 m backstroke, 14th 100 m backstroke
- 2003: 2003 World Aquatics Championships - 8th 200 m backstroke, 10th 100 m backstroke, 10th 4 × 100 m medley relay; European SC Championships 2003 - 1st 200 m backstroke, 13th 100 m backstroke
- 2004: 2004 Summer Olympics - 8th 200 m backstroke, 14th 4 × 100 m medley relay; European LC Championships 2004 - 4th 100 m backstroke, 4th 200 m backstroke; European SC Championships 2004 - 2nd 200 m backstroke, 4th 100 m backstroke
- 2005: 2005 World Aquatics Championships - 8th 100 m backstroke, 10th 200 m backstroke, final 4×100 medley relay (dq), 10th 4 × 100 m freestyle; Mediterranean Games - 1st 200 m backstroke, 1st 4 × 100 m medley relay; European SC Championships 2005 - 8th 200 m freestyle, 16th 100 m freestyle
- 2006: 2006 European Championships in Aquatics - 8th 200 m freestyle, 13th 400 m freestyle, 15th 100 m freestyle

Medvešek decided to retire in 2006 to focus on other aspects of his life and is currently finishing a degree in economics at the University of Maribor in Maribor, Slovenia.
