= Gordan Kožulj =

Croatian swimmer

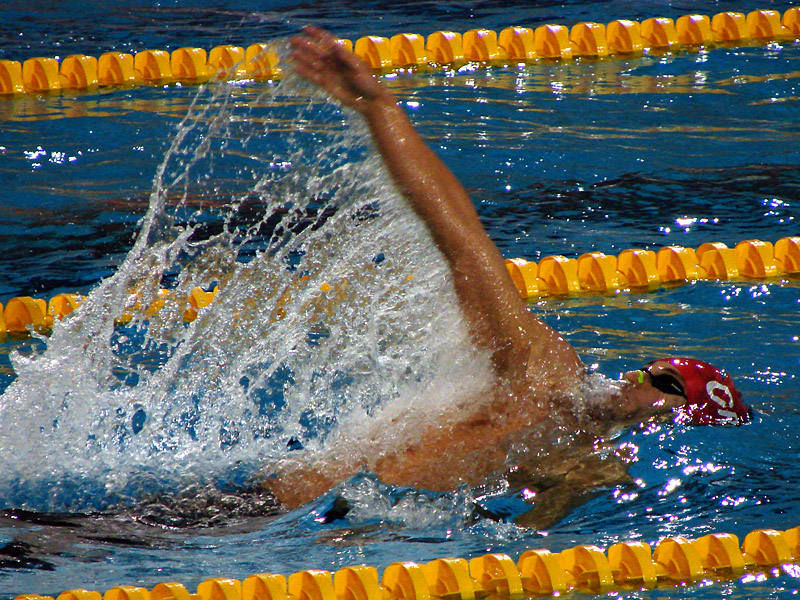
- Kožulj swimming backstroke at 2008 Euros.

Personal information
- Born: 28 November 1976 (age 49) Zagreb, SR Croatia, SFR Yugoslavia
Medal record
Men's swimming
Representing Croatia
World Championships
Silver medal – second place	2003 Barcelona	200 m backstroke
World SC Championships
Gold medal – first place	2000 Athens	200 m backstroke
European Championships
Gold medal – first place	2000 Helsinki	200 m backstroke
Gold medal – first place	2002 Berlin	200 m backstroke
Silver medal – second place	1999 Istanbul	100 m backstroke
Silver medal – second place	1999 Istanbul	200 m backstroke
Silver medal – second place	2008 Eindhoven	4×100 m medley
European Short Course Swimming Championships
Gold medal – first place	2001 Antwerp	200 m backstroke
Silver medal – second place	2000 Valencia	100 m backstroke
Silver medal – second place	2000 Valencia	200 m backstroke
Bronze medal – third place	2002 Riesa	200 m backstroke
Bronze medal – third place	2005 Trieste	200 m backstroke

Gordan Kožulj (born 28 November 1976) is a former backstroke swimmer from Croatia. During his sporting career, Gordan achieved numerous successes some of them are: US (1998), Europe (2000, 2001, 2002) and World (2000) swimming championship titles, and breaking European (100m backstroke) and World (200m backstroke World record progression 200 metres backstroke) short course swimming records. More specifically, at the 2003 World Aquatics Championships he won a silver medal in 200 m backstroke. In 2000 in Athens he became a world champion in 200 m backstroke (short course). In 1999 he won two silver medals at the European Championships in Istanbul, Turkey. Later on, in 2000 and 2002 he became a European champion in 200 m backstroke. Furthermore, Gordan competed in four consecutive Summer Olympics for his native country, starting in Atlanta 1996 and followed by Sydney 2000, Athens 2004 and Beijing 2008.

Based on these results, Gordan was named Croatia's Sportsman of the Year (by Croatian sport journalists) and the Best Croatian Athlete in 2002 (by the Croatian Olympic Committee). Also, the President of Croatia Franjo Tuđman awarded him with the Order for achievements in sports (1998) and received the special prize of the Croatian Olympic Committee for the best promoter of Croatian sport in the world.

During his professional swimming career, he independently managed marketing / sponsorship and PR relations, and has introduced a new marketing approach to promoting athletes in the Croatian market.

Academically, he graduated from the University of California, Berkeley, USA, with bachelor in Political economy, and gained MBA (Master of Business Administration) from the Faculty of Business and Economics, at the University of Zagreb, Croatia. Also, Gordan gained knowledge and experience in project management. In fact, he is a certified Project Manager Professional (PMP) issued by Project Management Institute (PMI).

== Post-swimming career ==
Kožulj retired from competitive swimming at the 2008 European Short Course Swimming Championships in Rijeka. In March 2008 he was appointed director of the Croatian national swimming team, replacing acting director Tomislav Karlo. In September 2009 Kožulj was elected to the European Olympic Committees Athletes' Commission. He was also elected to be a member of the European Olympic Committees' Marketing Commission. Later on he was employed by Madison Consulting where he worked for clients with regards to strategic communication consulting. In 2013 he started working as management consultant at Deloitte, where his objective is to help companies and institutions in planning, growth and restructuring through resolving key issues such as strategy, operations and change management.

Since 2010, as a member of National Council for sport, Gordan is adviser to the Croatian Parliament on sport issues, and acts as an Expert for the European Commission's Education, Audiovisual and Culture Executive Agency (EACEA). Furthermore, he was a member of the Expert Committee (assembled by the National Agency for Science and Higher Education) for conducting the re-accreditation of higher education institutions (2014). In the period 2009–2012 he volunteered as a General Secretary of the largest Croatian charity foundation "Korak u život" (engl. Step into the life). In 2012/2013 Gordan was the Chairman of the Zagreb-Rijeka Candidacy for the European Universities Games 2016, and after successful bidding he assumed the role of the Vice president of the Organizing Committee (2013–2016).

== Private life ==
Gordan is married to Ivana and they have two sons: Luka & Toma.

== Olympic results ==
Olympic results
Event	1996 Atlanta	2000 Sydney	2004 Athens	2008 Beijing
100 m backstroke	—N/a	14th 56.26	14th 56.02	24th 55.05
200 m backstroke	—N/a	8th 1:59.38	9th 1:59.61	14th 1:59.22
4 × 100 m medley relay	—N/a	14th 3:42.73	—N/a	12th 3:37.69
4 × 200 m freestyle relay	13th 7:43.69	—N/a	—N/a	—N/a
