= Tomomi Morita =

Japanese swimmer (born 1984)

Personal information
- Full name: Tomomi Morita
- Nationality: Japan
- Born: August 22, 1984 (age 41) Tomiya, Miyagi, Japan
- Height: 1.69 m (5 ft 7 in)
- Weight: 68 kg (150 lb)

Sport
- Sport: Swimming
- Strokes: Backstroke
Medal record
Men's swimming
Representing Japan
Olympic Games
Bronze medal – third place	2004 Athens	100 m backstroke
Bronze medal – third place	2004 Athens	4×100 m medley
World Championships (LC)
Silver medal – second place	2007 Melbourne	4×100 m medley
Bronze medal – third place	2005 Montreal	4×100 m medley
Asian Games
Bronze medal – third place	2002 Busan	100m backstroke
Pan Pacific Championships
Silver medal – second place	2006 Victoria	4×100 m medley
Bronze medal – third place	2002 Yokohama	100 m backstroke
Bronze medal – third place	2006 Victoria	100 m backstroke
Bronze medal – third place	2006 Victoria	200 m backstroke

Tomomi Morita (森田 智己, Morita Tomomi; born August 22, 1984 in Miyagi) is a backstroke swimmer from Japan. He represented his native country at the 2004 Summer Olympics in Athens, Greece. There, he won two bronze medals in the 100 m backstroke and as a member of the 4 × 100 m medley relay team.
