= Swimming at the 1998 World Aquatics Championships – Men's 100 metre breaststroke =

Men's 100 metre breaststroke at the 1998 FINA World Championships
- Date: 12 January 1998
- Competitors: 33
- Winning time: 1 minute 1.34 seconds

Medalists
gold medal	Frédérik Deburghgraeve	Belgium
silver medal	Zeng Qiliang	China
bronze medal	Kurt Grote	United States

The finals and the qualifying heats of the men's 100 metre breaststroke event at the 1998 World Aquatics Championships were held on Monday 12 January 1998 in Perth, Western Australia.

== A Final ==
Rank	Name	Time
Gold medal	Frédérik Deburghgraeve (BEL)	1:01.34
Silver medal	Zeng Qiliang (CHN)	1:01.76
Bronze medal	Kurt Grote (USA)	1:01.93
4	Phil Rogers (AUS)	1:02.01
5	Domenico Fioravanti (ITA)	1:02.13
6	Simon Cowley (AUS)	1:02.47
7	Károly Güttler (HUN)	1:02.53
8	Mark Warnecke (GER)	1:03.11

== B Final ==
Rank	Name	Time
9	Jens Kruppa (GER)	1:02.62
10	Daniel Málek (CZE)	1:03.09
11	Andrey Korneyev (RUS)	1:03.15
12	Aleksandr Gukov (BLR)	1:03.16
13	Richard Maden (GBR)	1:03.27
14	Benno Kuipers (NED)	1:03.31
15	Patrick Schmollinger (AUT)	1:03.33
16	Jeremy Linn (USA)	1:03.54

== Qualifying heats ==
Rank	Name	Time
1	Frédérik Deburghgraeve (BEL)	1:01.99
2	Domenico Fioravanti (ITA)	1:02.18
3	Kurt Grote (USA)	1:02.22
4	Zeng Qiliang (CHN)	1:02.34
5	Phil Rogers (AUS)	1:02.45
6	Simon Cowley (AUS)	1:02.48
7	Károly Güttler (HUN)	1:02.75
8	Mark Warnecke (GER)	1:02.83
9	Jeremy Linn (USA)	1:02.84
10	Jens Kruppa (GER)	1:02.85
11	Benno Kuipers (NED)	1:02.92
12	Richard Maden (GBR)	1:02.99
13	Patrick Schmollinger (AUT)	1:03.00
14	Andrey Korneyev (RUS)	1:03.01
15	Aleksandr Gukov (BLR)	1:03.19
16	Daniel Málek (CZE)	1:03.27
17	Norbert Rózsa (HUN)	1:03.30
18	Darren Mew (GBR)	1:03.36
19	Jean-Christophe Sarnin (FRA)	1:03.37
20.	Cho Kwang-Jea (KOR)	1:03.41
20.	Morgan Knabe (CAN)	1:03.41
22	Marc Capdevila (ESP)	1:03.67
23	Yoshinobu Miyazaki (JPN)	1:03.69
24	Marek Krawczyk (POL)	1:03.91
25	Stéphan Perrot (FRA)	1:03.92
26	José Couto (POR)	1:04.11
27	Patrik Isaksson (SWE)	1:04.12
28	Roman Ivanovsky (RUS)	1:04.21
29	Alwin de Prins (LUX)	1:04.48
30	Jorge Arias (PER)	1:05.20
31	Steven Ferguson (NZL)	1:05.35
32	Francisco Suriano (ESA)	1:05.38
33	Arsenio López (PUR)	1:05.45

== See also ==
- 1996 Men's Olympic Games 100m Breaststroke (Atlanta)
- 1997 Men's World SC Championships 100m Breaststroke (Gothenburg)
- 1997 Men's European LC Championships 100m Breaststroke (Seville)
- 2000 Men's Olympic Games 100m Breaststroke (Sydney)
