= Swimming at the 1998 World Aquatics Championships – Men's 200 metre breaststroke =

Men's 200 metre breaststroke at the 1998 FINA World Championships
- Date: 16 January 1998
- Competitors: 28
- Winning time: 2 minutes 13.40 seconds

Medalists
| gold medal | Kurt Grote | United States |
| silver medal | Jean-Christophe Sarnin | France |
| bronze medal | Norbert Rózsa | Hungary |

The finals and the qualifying heats of the men's 200 metre breaststroke event at the 1998 World Aquatics Championships were held on Friday 1998-01-16 in Perth, Western Australia.

== A Final ==
| Rank | Name | Time |
|---|---|---|
| Gold medal | Kurt Grote (USA) | 2:13.40 |
| Silver medal | Jean-Christophe Sarnin (FRA) | 2:13.42 |
| Bronze medal | Norbert Rózsa (HUN) | 2:13.59 |
| 4 | Simon Cowley (AUS) | 2:13.84 |
| 5 | Ryan Mitchell (AUS) | 2:14.43 |
| 6 | Benno Kuipers (NED) | 2:15.34 |
| 7 | Tom Wilkens (USA) | 2:15.41 |
| 8 | Aleksandr Gukov (BLR) | 2:15.51 |

== B Final ==
| Rank | Name | Time |
|---|---|---|
| 9 | Alexander Tkachev (RUS) | 2:15.48 |
| 10 | Marek Krawczyk (POL) | 2:16.14 |
| 11 | Daniel Málek (CZE) | 2:17.50 |
| 12 | Stéphan Perrot (FRA) | 2:17.58 |
| 13 | Morgan Knabe (CAN) | 2:17.71 |
| 14 | José Couto (POR) | 2:18.37 |
| 15 | Yoshiaki Okita (JPN) | 2:18.94 |
| 16 | Domenico Fioravanti (ITA) | 2:22.30 |

== Qualifying heats ==
| Rank | Name | Time | Notes |
|---|---|---|---|
| 1 | Ryan Mitchell (AUS) | 2:13.37 | |
| 2 | Norbert Rózsa (HUN) | 2:14.86 | |
| 3 | Simon Cowley (AUS) | 2:14.93 | |
| 4 | Jean-Christophe Sarnin (FRA) | 2:15.09 | |
| 5 | Benno Kuipers (NED) | 2:15.23 | |
| 6 | Kurt Grote (USA) | 2:15.29 | |
| 7 | Tom Wilkens (USA) | 2:15.57 | |
| 8 | Aleksandr Gukov (BLR) | 2:15.63 | |
| 9 | Alexander Tkachev (RUS) | 2:15.76 | |
| 10 | Marek Krawczyk (POL) | 2:15.98 | |
| 11 | Károly Güttler (HUN) | 2:16.10 | scratched finals |
| 12 | Yoshiaki Okita (JPN) | 2:16.30 | |
| 13 | Stéphan Perrot (FRA) | 2:16.36 | |
| 14 | Daniel Málek (CZE) | 2:16.88 | |
| 15 | Andrey Korneyev (RUS) | 2:17.21 | scratched finals |
| 16 | José Couto (POR) | 2:17.51 | |
| 17 | Domenico Fioravanti (ITA) | 2:17.64 | |
| 18 | Morgan Knabe (CAN) | 2:18.35 | |
| 19 | Fred Deburghgraeve (BEL) | 2:18.86 | |
| 20 | Ratapong Sirisanont (THA) | 2:19.12 | |
| 21 | Chikara Nakashita (JPN) | 2:19.74 | |
| 22 | Cho Kwang-Jea (KOR) | 2:19.93 | |
| 23 | Marc Capdevila (ESP) | 2:20.75 | |
| 24 | Alwin de Prins (LUX) | 2:20.78 | |
| 25 | Valērijs Kalmikovs (LAT) | 2:21.22 | |
| 26 | Arsenio López (PUR) | 2:21.23 | |
| 27 | Jorge Arias (PER) | 2:21.24 | NR |
| 28 | Francisco Suriano (ESA) | 2:21.61 | |

== See also ==
- 1996 Men's Olympic Games 200m Breaststroke (Atlanta)
- 1997 Men's World SC Championships 200m Breaststroke (Gothenburg)
- 1997 Men's European LC Championships 200m Breaststroke (Seville)
- 2000 Men's Olympic Games 200m Breaststroke (Sydney)
