= Swimming at the 1997 European Aquatics Championships – Men's 100 metre breaststroke =

The final of the Men's 100 metres Breaststroke event at the European LC Championships 1997 was held on Tuesday 19 August 1997 in Seville, Spain.

== Finals ==
| RANK | FINAL A | TIME |
|---|---|---|
| | Aleksandr Gukov (BLR) | 1:01.17 |
| | Károly Güttler (HUN) | 1:02.23 |
| | Daniel Málek (CZE) | 1:02.27 |
| 4. | Jean-Christophe Sarnin (FRA) | 1:02.49 |
| 5. | Domenico Fioravanti (ITA) | 1:02.51 |
| 6. | Benno Kuipers (NED) | 1:02.70 |
| 7. | Jens Kruppa (GER) | 1:02.72 |
| 8. | Vadim Alexeev (ISR) | 1:03.78 |

| RANK | FINAL B | TIME |
|---|---|---|
| 9. | Roman Ivanovsky (RUS) | 1:02.63 |
| 10. | José Couto (POR) | 1:02.73 |
| 11. | Patrick Schmollinger (AUT) | 1:03.13 |
| 12. | Richard Maden (GBR) | 1:03.18 |
| 13. | Marek Krawczyk (POL) | 1:03.32 |
| 14. | Sergei Sergeyev (UKR) | 1:03.42 |
| 15. | Stéphan Perrot (FRA) | 1:03.43 |
| 16. | Uri Shtift (ISR) | 1:04.03 |

== Qualifying heats ==
| RANK | HEATS RANKING | TIME |
|---|---|---|
| 1. | Jens Kruppa (GER) | 1:02.38 |
| 2. | Domenico Fioravanti (ITA) | 1:02.73 |
| 3. | Benno Kuipers (NED) | 1:02.79 |
| 4. | Károly Güttler (HUN) | 1:02.80 |
| 5. | Daniel Málek (CZE) | 1:02.84 |
| 6. | Aleksandr Gukov (BLR) | 1:02.88 |
| 7. | Jean-Christophe Sarnin (FRA) | 1:03.00 |
| 8. | Vadim Alexeev (ISR) | 1:03.22 |
| 9. | Patrick Schmollinger (AUT) | 1:03.28 |
| 10. | Roman Ivanovsky (RUS) | 1:03.33 |
| 11. | Stéphan Perrot (FRA) | 1:03.36 |
| 12. | Richard Maden (GBR) | 1:03.38 |
| 13. | Marek Krawczyk (POL) | 1:03.56 |
| 14. | Sergei Sergeyev (UKR) | 1:03.64 |
| 15. | Uri Shtift (ISR) | 1:03.90 |
| 16. | José Couto (POR) | 1:03.95 |
| 17. | Marc Capdevila (ESP) | 1:03.95 |
| 18. | Artur Paczynski (POL) | 1:04.34 |
| 19. | Roman Havrlant (CZE) | 1:04.48 |
| 20. | Vilmos Kovacs (HUN) | 1:04.51 |
| 21. | Borge Mork (NOR) | 1:04.53 |
| 22. | Andrew Ayers (GBR) | 1:04.60 |
| 23. | Tudor Ignat (ROM) | 1:04.72 |
| 24. | Ismael García (ESP) | 1:04.78 |
| 25. | Michael Giles (IRL) | 1:04.83 |
| 26. | Remo Lütolf (SUI) | 1:05.16 |
| 26. | Andrei Sarapajevas (LTU) | 1:05.16 |
| 28. | Hjalti Guðmundsson (ISL) | 1:05.51 |
| 29. | Jakob Andersen (DEN) | 1:05.82 |
| 30. | Alwin de Prins (LUX) | 1:06.20 |

== See also ==
- 1996 Men's Olympic Games 100m Breaststroke
- 1997 Men's World Championships (SC) 100m Breaststroke
