= 1998 European Short Course Swimming Championships – Men's 50 metre breaststroke =

The finals and the qualifying heats of the Men's 50 metres Breaststroke event at the 1998 European Short Course Swimming Championships were held on the first day of the competition, on Friday 11 December 1998 in Sheffield, England.

== Finals ==
RANK	FINAL	TIME
Gold medal	Mark Warnecke (GER)	26.70 WR
Silver medal	Patrik Isaksson (SWE)	27.21
Bronze medal	Patrick Schmollinger (AUT)	27.60
4.	Daniel Málek (CZE)	27.64
5.	Remo Lütolf (SUI)	27.78
6.	Domenico Fioravanti (ITA)	27.98
7.	José Couto (POR)	28.21
8.	Peter Aronsson (SWE)	28.22

== Qualifying Heats ==
RANK	HEATS RANKING	TIME
1.	Mark Warnecke (GER)	27.05
2.	Patrik Isaksson (SWE)	27.27
3.	Daniel Málek (CZE)	27.62
4.	Patrick Schmollinger (AUT)	27.69
5.	Remo Lütolf (SUI)	27.97
6.	Domenico Fioravanti (ITA)	28.11
7.	José Couto (POR)	28.19
8.	Peter Aronsson (SWE)	28.28
9.	Benno Kuipers (NED)	28.29
10.	Emil Tahirovič (SLO)	28.30
11.	Roman Havrlant (CZE)	28.37
12.	Raiko Pachel (EST)	28.41
13.	Maxim Podoprigora (AUT)	28.51
14.	Nick Poole (GBR)	28.53
15.	Stéphan Perrot (FRA)	28.64
16.	Gavin Brettell (GBR)	28.67
17.	Borge Mork (NOR)	28.73
18.	Vadim Alexeev (ISR)	28.74
19.	Cédric Bavay (BEL)	28.74
20.	Aleksandr Gukov (BLR)	28.93
21.	Guillaume Ycard (FRA)	29.00
22.	Santiago Castellanos (ESP)	29.02
23.	Roman Melis (SVK)	29.10
24.	Hjalti Gudmundsson (ISL)	29.15
25.	Gregor Govse (SLO)	29.25
—	Jens Kruppa (GER)	DSQ
