= Swimming at the 1997 European Aquatics Championships – Men's 200 metre breaststroke =

The final of the Men's 200 metres Breaststroke event at the European LC Championships 1997 was held on Friday 1997-08-22 in Seville, Spain.

== Finals ==
RANK	FINAL A	TIME
	Aleksandr Gukov (BLR)	2:13.90
	Andrey Korneyev (RUS)	2:14.40
	Daniel Málek (CZE)	2:14.74
4.	Benno Kuipers (NED)	2:14.83
5.	José Couto (POR)	2:14.90
6.	Stéphan Perrot (FRA)	2:14.94
7.	Jean-Christophe Sarnin (FRA)	2:15.19
8.	Artur Paczynski (POL)	2:16.33

== See also ==
- 1996 Men's Olympic Games 200m Breaststroke
- 1997 Men's World Championships (SC) 200m Breaststroke
