= 1997 FINA Short Course World Championships – Men's 100m breaststroke =

The finals and the qualifying heats of the men's 100 metres breaststroke event at the 1997 FINA Short Course World Championships were held on the second day of the competition, on Friday 18 April 1997 in Gothenburg, Sweden.

== Finals ==
RANK	FINAL A	TIME
	Patrik Isaksson (SWE)	59.99
	Stanislav Lopukhov (RUS)	1:00.05
	Jens Kruppa (GER)	1:00.18
4.	Richard Maden (GBR)	1:00.32
5.	Phil Rogers (AUS)	1:00.46
6.	Andrey Perminov (RUS)	1:00.56
7.	Zeng Qiliang (CHN)	1:00.66
8.	Aleksandr Gukov (BLR)	1:00.89

RANK	FINAL B	TIME
9.	Roman Havrlant (CZE)	1:00.91
10.	Patrick Schmollinger (AUT)	1:01.06
11.	Chikara Nakashita (JPN)	1:01.14
12.	Daniel Málek (CZE)	1:01.23
13.	Russell Patrick (CAN)	1:01.64
14.	José Couto (POR)	1:01.79
15.	Jens Johansson (SWE)	1:01.84
16.	Ryan Mitchell (AUS)	1:02.34

== Qualifying heats ==
RANK	HEATS RANKING	TIME
1.	Jens Kruppa (GER)	1:00.37
2.	Stanislav Lopukhov (RUS)	1:00.47
3.	Andrey Perminov (RUS)	1:00.49
4.	Phil Rogers (AUS)	1:00.58
5.	Richard Maden (GBR)	1:00.68
6.	Zeng Qiliang (CHN)	1:00.69
7.	Aleksandr Gukov (BLR)	1:00.85
7.	Patrik Isaksson (SWE)	1:00.85
9.	Patrick Schmollinger (AUT)	1:01.09
10.	Chikara Nakashita (JPN)	1:01.34
11.	Jens Johansson (SWE)	1:01.44
12.	José Couto (POR)	1:01.51
13.	Daniel Málek (CZE)	1:01.53
14.	Russell Patrick (CAN)	1:01.74
15.	Roman Havrlant (CZE)	1:01.79
16.	Ryan Mitchell (AUS)	1:01.80
17.	Alan Pessotti (BRA)	1:01.85
18.	Andrew Ayers (GBR)	1:02.38
19.	Joaquín Fernández (ESP)	1:02.67
20.	Steven West (USA)	1:02.91
21.	Raiko Pachel (EST)	1:02.97
22.	Borge Mork (NOR)	1:03.09
23.	Tudor Ignat (ROM)	1:03.35
24.	Valeri Kalmikovs (LAT)	1:03.38
25.	Andres Grasso (ARG)	1:03.39
26.	Andrei Sarapajevas (LTU)	1:03.49
27.	Alwin de Prins (LUX)	1:03.51
28.	Juan Madrigal (CRC)	1:03.76
29.	Remo Lütolf (SUI)	1:03.81
30.	Ron Karnaugh (USA)	1:03.88
31.	Wang Yiwu (CHN)	1:04.01
32.	Yevgeni Petrashov (KGZ)	1:04.11

== See also ==
- 1996 Men's Olympic Games 100m Breaststroke
- 1997 Men's European LC Championships 100m Breaststroke
