= Swimming at the 1997 European Aquatics Championships – Men's 4 × 100 metre medley relay =

The final of the Men's 4 × 100 m Medley Relay event at the European LC Championships 1997 was held on Sunday 1997-08-24 in Seville, Spain.

== Results ==
RANK	FINAL	TIME
	RUSSIA; Vladimir Selkov; Andrey Korneyev; Vladislav Kulikov; Alexander Popov	3:39.67; 56.31; 1:01.42; 52.92; 49.02
	GERMANY; Ralf Braun; Jens Kruppa; Thomas Rupprath; Christian Tröger	3:41.47; 56.43; 1:02.31; 53.63; 49.10
	POLAND; Mariusz Siembida; Marek Krawczyk; Marcin Kaczmarek; Bartosz Kizierowski	3:42.90; 55.63; 1:02.92; 53.90; 49.75
4.	ITALY; Emanuele Merisi; Domenico Fioravanti; Luis Alberto Laera; Lorenzo Vismara	3:43.92; 56.66; 1:02.53; 55.10; 49.14
5.	ISRAEL; Eithan Urbach; Vadim Alexeev; Eran Groumi; Yoav Bruck	3:43.64; 56.41; 1:03.15; 54.39; 49.69
6.	GREAT BRITAIN; Martin Harris; Richard Maden; Stephen Parry; Mark Foster	3:43.83; 56.77; 1:02.64; 54.35; 50.07
7.	SPAIN; Martin López-Zubero; Marc Capdevila; Juan Ramón Fernández; Juan Benavides	3:44.25; 55.76; 1:02.47; 55.72; 50.30
8.	SWITZERLAND; Rolf Schwyter; Remo Lütolf; Philippe Meyer; Alex Miescher-Jost	3:48.97; 58.50; 1:04.63; 54.69; 51.15

== See also ==
- 1996 Men's Olympic Games 4 × 100 m Medley Relay
- 1997 Men's World Championships (SC) 4 × 100 m Medley Relay
