= 1997 FINA Short Course World Championships – Men's 200m breaststroke =

The finals and the qualifying heats of the men's 200 metres breaststroke event at the 1997 FINA Short Course World Championships were held on the third day of the competition, on Saturday 20 April 1997 in Gothenburg, Sweden.

== Finals ==
RANK	FINAL A	TIME
	Aleksandr Gukov (BLR)	2:09.25
	Andrey Korneyev (RUS)	2:09.28
	Jens Kruppa (GER)	2:10.53
4.	Stanislav Lopukhov (RUS)	2:10.58
5.	Chikara Nakashita (JPN)	2:10.84
6.	Richard Maden (GBR)	2:10.95
7.	Joaquín Fernández (ESP)	2:11.64
8.	Wang Yiwu (CHN)	2:14.61

RANK	FINAL B	TIME
9.	Daniel Málek (CZE)	2:12.38
10.	Phil Rogers (AUS)	2:12.44
11.	Andrew Ayers (GBR)	2:12.47
12.	José Couto (POR)	2:12.84
13.	Ryan Mitchell (AUS)	2:13.00
14.	Borge Mork (NOR)	2:13.17
15.	Valeri Kalmikovs (LAT)	2:13.34
16.	Peter Aronsson (SWE)	2:14.34

== See also ==
- 1996 Men's Olympic Games 200m Breaststroke
- 1997 Men's European LC Championships 200m Breaststroke
