= Swimming at the 1996 Summer Olympics – Men's 100 metre breaststroke =

Men's 100 metre breaststroke at the Games of the XXVI Olympiad
- Venue: Georgia Tech Aquatic Center
- Date: 20 July 1996 (heats & finals)
- Competitors: 45 from 41 nations
- Winning time: 1:00.65

Medalists
1st place, gold medalist(s)		Frédérik Deburghgraeve; Belgium
2nd place, silver medalist(s)		Jeremy Linn; United States
3rd place, bronze medalist(s)		Mark Warnecke; Germany

The men's 100 metre breaststroke event at the 1996 Summer Olympics took place on 20 July at the Georgia Tech Aquatic Center in Atlanta, United States.

== Records ==
Prior to this competition, the existing world and Olympic records were as follows.

World record	Károly Güttler (HUN)	1:00.95	Sheffield, United Kingdom	3 August 1993
Olympic record	Nelson Diebel (USA)	1:01.50	Barcelona, Spain	26 July 1992

The following records were established during the competition:

Date	Round	Name	Nationality	Time	Record
20 July	Heat 6	Frédérik Deburghgraeve	Belgium	1:00.60	WR

== Results ==
=== Heats ===
Rule: The eight fastest swimmers advance to final A (Q), while the next eight to final B (q).

Rank	Heat	Lane	Name	Nationality	Time	Notes
1	6	4	Frédérik Deburghgraeve	Belgium	1:00.60	Q, WR
2	4	3	Jeremy Linn	United States	1:01.53	Q
3	5	3	Mark Warnecke	Germany	1:01.79	Q
4	5	4	Károly Güttler	Hungary	1:01.80	Q
4	5	5	Phil Rogers	Australia	1:01.80	Q
6	6	6	Stanislav Lopukhov	Russia	1:02.00	Q
7	4	5	Kurt Grote	United States	1:02.01	Q
8	5	2	Zeng Qiliang	China	1:02.26	Q
9	5	1	Daniel Málek	Czech Republic	1:02.46	q, NR
10	5	6	Akira Hayashi	Japan	1:02.63	q
11	5	8	Marc Capdevila	Spain	1:02.69	q
11	6	5	Roman Ivanovsky	Russia	1:02.69	q
13	4	4	Oleksandr Dzhaburiya	Ukraine	1:02.70	q
14	6	3	Norbert Rózsa	Hungary	1:02.72	q, WD
15	4	6	Paul Kent	New Zealand	1:02.76	q
16	4	7	Richard Maden	Great Britain	1:02.78	q
17	6	2	Vladimir Latocha	France	1:02.80	q
18	4	2	Vadim Alexeev	Israel	1:02.92	
18	6	1	Benno Kuipers	Netherlands	1:02.92	
20	3	1	Mario González	Cuba	1:03.05	NR
21	5	7	Todd Torres	Puerto Rico	1:03.08	
22	6	7	Yoshinobu Miyazaki	Japan	1:03.13	
23	6	8	Jonathan Cleveland	Canada	1:03.14	
24	4	8	Cho Kwang-jea	South Korea	1:03.39	
25	4	1	Marek Krawczyk	Poland	1:03.57	
26	3	3	Ratapong Sirisanont	Thailand	1:03.81	
27	3	4	Aleksey Kriventsov	Belarus	1:04.20	
28	3	5	Nerijus Beiga	Lithuania	1:04.45	
29	3	8	Elvin Chia	Malaysia	1:04.46	NR
30	2	4	Vadim Tatarov	Moldova	1:04.87	
31	3	7	Børge Mørk	Norway	1:04.92	
32	2	3	Mauricio Moreno	Colombia	1:05.22	
33	3	2	Huang Chih-yung	Chinese Taipei	1:05.26	
34	2	7	Juan José Madrigal	Costa Rica	1:05.47	NR
35	2	2	Jörg Lindemeier	Namibia	1:05.50	
36	2	6	Christophe Verdino	Monaco	1:05.66	
37	2	5	Francisco Suriano	El Salvador	1:05.82	
38	3	6	Aleksandr Savitsky	Kazakhstan	1:05.85	
39	1	3	Jorge Arias	Peru	1:06.03	NR
40	2	8	Desmond Koh	Singapore	1:06.97	
41	1	6	Jean Luc Razakarivony	Madagascar	1:07.34	
42	2	1	Yevgeny Petrashov	Kyrgyzstan	1:07.44	
43	1	5	Bernard Desmarais	Mauritius	1:09.05	
44	1	2	Karar Rahman	Bangladesh	1:11.47	
45	1	4	Sultan Al-Otaibi	Kuwait	1:12.65	

=== Finals ===
==== Final B ====
Rank	Lane	Name	Nationality	Time	Notes
9	8	Vladimir Latocha	France	1:02.28	
10	4	Daniel Málek	Czech Republic	1:02.39	NR
11	1	Richard Maden	Great Britain	1:02.51	
12	5	Akira Hayashi	Japan	1:02.75	
13	2	Oleksandr Dzhaburiya	Ukraine	1:02.91	
14	7	Paul Kent	New Zealand	1:03.05	
15	3	Marc Capdevila	Spain	1:03.51	
	6	Roman Ivanovsky	Russia	DSQ	

==== Final A ====
Rank	Lane	Name	Nationality	Time	Notes
1st place, gold medalist(s)	4	Frédérik Deburghgraeve	Belgium	1:00.65	
2nd place, silver medalist(s)	5	Jeremy Linn	United States	1:00.77	AM
3rd place, bronze medalist(s)	3	Mark Warnecke	Germany	1:01.33	NR
4	2	Károly Güttler	Hungary	1:01.49	
5	6	Phil Rogers	Australia	1:01.64	OC
6	1	Kurt Grote	United States	1:01.69	
7	8	Zeng Qiliang	China	1:02.01	
8	7	Stanislav Lopukhov	Russia	1:02.13	
