= Swimming at the 1998 World Aquatics Championships – Men's 200 metre backstroke =

Men's 200 metre backstroke at the 1998 FINA World Championships
- Date: 18 January 1998
- Competitors: 26
- Winning time: 1 minute 58.84 seconds

Medalists
gold medal	Lenny Krayzelburg	United States
silver medal	Ralf Braun	Germany
bronze medal	Mark Versfeld	Canada

The finals and the qualifying heats of the men's 200 metre backstroke event at the 1998 World Aquatics Championships were held on Sunday 1998-01-18 in Perth, Western Australia.

== A Final ==
Rank	Name	Time
Gold medal	Lenny Krayzelburg (USA)	1:58.84
Silver medal	Ralf Braun (GER)	1:59.23
Bronze medal	Mark Versfeld (CAN)	1:59.39
4	Emanuele Merisi (ITA)	1:59.59
5	Brad Bridgewater (USA)	2:00.02
6	Fu Yong (CHN)	2:00.40
7	Bartosz Sikora (POL)	2:00.71
8	Adam Ruckwood (GBR)	2:01.10

== B Final ==
Rank	Name	Time
9	Vladislav Aminov (RUS)	2:01.90
10	Jorge Sánchez (ESP)	2:02.04
11	Stefano Battistelli (ITA)	2:03.03
12	Marko Strahija (CRO)	2:03.12
13	Rogério Romero (BRA)	2:03.14
14	Arūnas Savickas (LTU)	2:03.74
15	Adrian Radley (AUS)	2:03.91
16	Miroslav Machovič (SVK)	2:05.36

== Qualifying heats ==
Rank	Name	Time
1	Lenny Krayzelburg (USA)	1:59.36
2	Mark Versfeld (CAN)	2:00.49
3	Adam Ruckwood (GBR)	2:00.52
4	Brad Bridgewater (USA)	2:00.53
5	Emanuele Merisi (ITA)	2:00.73
6	Ralf Braun (GER)	2:01.13
7	Bartosz Sikora (POL)	2:01.50
7	Fu Yong (CHN)	2:01.76
9	Neisser Bent (CUB)	2:02.09
10	Vladimir Selkov (RUS)	2:02.09
11	Vladislav Aminov (RUS)	2:02.67
12	Jorge Sánchez (ESP)	2:02.73
13	Arūnas Savickas (LTU)	2:02.92
14	Stefano Battistelli (ITA)	2:03.55
15	Marko Strahija (CRO)	2:03.76
16	Rogério Romero (BRA)	2:03.83
17	Miroslav Machovič (SVK)	2:04.46
18	Adrian Radley (AUS)	2:04.48
19	David Ortega (ESP)	2:05.12
20	Örn Arnarson (ISL)	2:05.61
21	Alexis Perdomo (VEN)	2:05.66
22	Nuno Laurentino (POR)	2:06.67
23	Darius Grigalionis (LTU)	2:07.39
24	Adrian O'Connor (IRL)	2:08.10
25	Carlos Arena (MEX)	2:08.21
26	Hugh O'Connor (IRL)	2:08.39

== See also ==
- 1996 Men's Olympic Games 200m Backstroke (Atlanta)
- 1997 Men's World SC Championships 200m Backstroke (Gothenburg)
- 1997 Men's European LC Championships 200m Backstroke (Seville)
- 2000 Men's Olympic Games 200m Backstroke (Sydney)
