= 1998 European Short Course Swimming Championships – Men's 50 metre backstroke =

The finals and the qualifying heats of the Men's 50 metres Backstroke event at the 1998 European Short Course Swimming Championships were held on the first day of the competition, on Friday 11 December 1998 in Sheffield, England.

== Finals ==
RANK	FINAL	TIME
Gold medal	Thomas Rupprath (GER)	24.13 WR
Silver medal	Stev Theloke (GER)	24.66
Bronze medal	Daniel Carlsson (SWE)	24.67
4.	Tomislav Karlo (CRO)	24.71
5.	Darius Grigalionis (LTU)	24.72
6.	Miro Žeravica (CRO)	25.00
7.	Mariusz Siembida (POL)	25.10
8.	Tom Eilert Karlsen (NOR)	25.21

== Qualifying Heats ==
RANK	HEATS RANKING	TIME
1.	Thomas Rupprath (GER)	24.41
2.	Daniel Carlsson (SWE)	24.69
3.	Tomislav Karlo (CRO)	24.74
4.	Miro Žeravica (CRO)	24.89
5.	Tom Eilert Karlsen (NOR)	25.11
5.	Mariusz Siembida (POL)	25.11
7.	Darius Grigalionis (LTU)	25.21
8.	Stev Theloke (GER)	25.37
9.	Eithan Urbach (ISR)	25.47
10.	Goran Porvali (FIN)	25.49
11.	Örn Arnarson (ISL)	25.54
12.	Nuno Laurentino (POR)	25.55
13.	Mindaugas Spokas (LTU)	25.72
14.	Neil Willey (GBR)	25.74
15.	Volodymyr Nikolaychuk (UKR)	25.79
16.	Franck Schott (FRA)	25.80
17.	Miroslav Machovic (SVK)	25.85
17.	Tero Raty (FIN)	25.85
19.	Blaž Medvešek (SLO)	25.93
20.	Oliver Schmich (AUT)	26.01
21.	Alexandre Gonçalves (POR)	26.02
22.	Răzvan Florea (ROM)	26.02
23.	Emanuele Merisi (ITA)	26.07
24.	Jorge Sánchez (ESP)	26.10
25.	Petter Sjødal (NOR)	26.22
26.	Simon Handley (GBR)	26.30
27.	Marek Tokolyi (SVK)	26.46
28.	Pierrick Chavatte (FRA)	26.60
29.	Hugh O'Connor (IRL)	26.68
30.	Andrew Reid (IRL)	27.41
