= Swimming at the 1996 Summer Olympics – Men's 200 metre breaststroke =

Men's 200 metre breaststroke at the Games of the XXVI Olympiad
- Venue: Georgia Tech Aquatic Center
- Date: 24 July 1996 (heats & finals)
- Competitors: 36 from 31 nations
- Winning time: 2:12.57

Medalists
1st place, gold medalist(s)		Norbert Rózsa	Hungary
2nd place, silver medalist(s)		Károly Güttler	Hungary
3rd place, bronze medalist(s)		Andrey Korneyev	Russia

The men's 200 metre breaststroke event at the 1996 Summer Olympics took place on 24 July at the Georgia Tech Aquatic Center in Atlanta, United States.

== Records ==
Prior to this competition, the existing world and Olympic records were as follows.

World record	Mike Barrowman (USA)	2:10.16	Barcelona, Spain	29 July 1992
Olympic record	Mike Barrowman (USA)	2:10.16	Barcelona, Spain	29 July 1992

== Results ==
=== Heats ===
Rule: The eight fastest swimmers advance to final A (Q), while the next eight to final B (q).

Rank	Heat	Lane	Name	Nationality	Time	Notes
1	4	4	Károly Güttler	Hungary	2:13.89	Q
2	5	4	Andrey Korneyev	Russia	2:14.11	Q
3	5	5	Kurt Grote	United States	2:14.63	Q
4	3	5	Norbert Rózsa	Hungary	2:14.66	Q
5	3	6	Nick Gillingham	Great Britain	2:14.96	Q
6	4	3	Phil Rogers	Australia	2:14.97	Q
7	5	2	Marek Krawczyk	Poland	2:15.17	Q
8	5	6	Eric Wunderlich	United States	2:15.18	Q
9	4	2	Jean-Christophe Sarnin	France	2:15.27	q
10	3	3	Ryan Mitchell	Australia	2:15.31	q
11	3	4	Akira Hayashi	Japan	2:15.37	q
12	5	3	Andrey Ivanov	Russia	2:15.56	q
13	3	7	Joaquín Fernández	Spain	2:16.05	q
14	5	7	Jonathan Cleveland	Canada	2:16.08	q
15	4	5	Frédérik Deburghgraeve	Belgium	2:16.10	q, WD
16	3	8	Mario González	Cuba	2:16.15	q
17	2	5	Valērijs Kalmikovs	Latvia	2:17.07	q, NR
18	3	1	Daniel Málek	Czech Republic	2:17.08	
19	2	8	José Couto	Portugal	2:17.28	NR
20	4	1	Ratapong Sirisanont	Thailand	2:17.32	
21	2	6	Aliaksandr Hukau	Belarus	2:17.49	
22	5	1	Dmytro Ivanusa	Ukraine	2:17.54	
23	4	8	Stéphan Perrot	France	2:18.58	
24	3	2	Wang Yiwu	China	2:19.13	
25	2	3	Elvin Chia	Malaysia	2:20.39	
26	4	7	Børge Mørk	Norway	2:20.42	
27	4	8	Vadim Alexeev	Israel	2:20.47	
28	2	2	Christophe Verdino	Monaco	2:20.77	
29	2	4	Vadim Tatarov	Moldova	2:21.34	
30	1	5	Roberto Bonilla	Guatemala	2:21.86	
31	2	1	Todd Torres	Puerto Rico	2:22.66	
32	2	7	Nerijus Beiga	Lithuania	2:23.40	
33	1	4	Francisco Suriano	El Salvador	2:25.57	
34	1	3	Huang Chih-yung	Chinese Taipei	2:25.96	
	1	6	Desmond Koh	Singapore	DNS	
	5	8	Paul Kent	New Zealand	DNS	

=== Finals ===
==== Final B ====
Rank	Lane	Name	Nationality	Time	Notes
9	6	Andrey Ivanov	Russia	2:14.37	
10	1	Mario González	Cuba	2:15.11	NR
11	5	Ryan Mitchell	Australia	2:15.63	
12	2	Joaquín Fernández	Spain	2:16.05	
13	8	Valērijs Kalmikovs	Latvia	2:16.23	NR
14	4	Jean-Christophe Sarnin	France	2:16.26	
15	1	Jonathan Cleveland	Canada	2:16.39	
16	3	Akira Hayashi	Japan	2:16.69	

==== Final A ====
Rank	Lane	Name	Nationality	Time	Notes
1st place, gold medalist(s)	6	Norbert Rózsa	Hungary	2:12.57	
2nd place, silver medalist(s)	4	Károly Güttler	Hungary	2:13.03	
3rd place, bronze medalist(s)	5	Andrey Korneyev	Russia	2:13.17	
4	2	Nick Gillingham	Great Britain	2:14.37	
5	7	Phil Rogers	Australia	2:14.79	
6	1	Marek Krawczyk	Poland	2:14.84	NR
7	8	Eric Wunderlich	United States	2:15.69	
8	3	Kurt Grote	United States	2:16.05	
