= Swimming at the 1997 European Aquatics Championships – Men's 200 metre backstroke =

The final of the Men's 200 metres Backstroke event at the European LC Championships 1997 was held on Thursday 21 August 1997 in Seville, Spain.

== Finals ==
| RANK | FINAL A | TIME |
|---|---|---|
| | Vladimir Selkov (RUS) | 1:59.21 |
| | Emanuele Merisi (ITA) | 1:59.63 |
| | Ralf Braun (GER) | 1:59.91 |
| 4. | Adam Ruckwood (GBR) | 2:00.93 |
| 5. | Marko Strahija (CRO) | 2:01.34 |
| 6. | Stefano Battistelli (ITA) | 2:01.75 |
| 7. | Lars Kalenka (GER) | 2:02.17 |
| 8. | Bartosz Sikora (POL) | 2:02.27 |

| RANK | FINAL B | TIME |
|---|---|---|
| 9. | Volodymyr Nikolaychuk (UKR) | 2:02.10 |
| 10. | Mariusz Siembida (POL) | 2:02.50 |
| 11. | Jorge Sánchez (ESP) | 2:02.85 |
| 12. | Arūnas Savickas (LTU) | 2:02.89 |
| 13. | Gordan Kožulj (CRO) | 2:02.96 |
| 14. | Eithan Urbach (ISR) | 2:03.39 |
| 15. | Sergey Ostapchuk (RUS) | 2:03.96 |
| 16. | Örn Arnarson (ISL) | 2:04.04 |

== Qualifying heats ==
| RANK | HEATS RANKING | TIME |
|---|---|---|
| 1. | Marko Strahija (CRO) | 2:01.37 |
| 2. | Bartosz Sikora (POL) | 2:01.38 |
| 3. | Stefano Battistelli (ITA) | 2:01.48 |
| 4. | Vladimir Selkov (RUS) | 2:01.65 |
| 5. | Emanuele Merisi (ITA) | 2:01.69 |
| 6. | Adam Ruckwood (GBR) | 2:01.77 |
| 7. | Lars Kalenka (GER) | 2:01.97 |
| 8. | Ralf Braun (GER) | 2:01.98 |
| 9. | Mariusz Siembida (POL) | 2:02.15 |
| 10. | Arūnas Savickas (LTU) | 2:02.38 |
| 11. | Gordan Kožulj (CRO) | 2:02.41 |
| 12. | Jorge Sánchez (ESP) | 2:02.95 |
| 13. | Volodymyr Nikolaychuk (UKR) | 2:02.98 |
| 14. | Eithan Urbach (ISR) | 2:03.07 |
| 15. | Örn Arnarson (ISL) | 2:03.43 |
| 16. | Sergey Ostapchuk (RUS) | 2:04.15 |
| 17. | Neil Willey (GBR) | 2:04.47 |
| 18. | Miroslav Machovic (SVK) | 2:04.90 |
| 19. | Yoav Gath (ISR) | 2:04.95 |
| 20. | Guillermo Mediano (ESP) | 2:05.94 |
| 21. | Hugh O'Connor (IRL) | 2:06.08 |
| 22. | Nuno Laurentino (POR) | 2:06.10 |
| 23. | Rolf Schwyter (SUI) | 2:06.24 |
| 24. | Nicolae Butacu (ROM) | 2:06.48 |
| 25. | Marko Milenkovič (SLO) | 2:08.03 |
| 26. | Adrian O'Connor (IRL) | 2:08.42 |

== See also ==
- 1996 Men's Olympic Games 200m Backstroke
- 1997 Men's World Championships (SC) 200m Backstroke
