= Schmollinger =

Schmollinger is a surname. Notable people with the surname include:

- Patrick Schmollinger (born 1973), Austrian swimmer
- William Schmollinger (fl. 1830s), English cartographer
