= Nadezhda Aschepkova =

Russian swimming coach

- Born: 7 August 1958
- Died: 13 February 2019 (aged 60)
- Occupation: Swimming coach
- Awards: Honored Coach of Russia

Nadezhda Alexandrovna Aschepkova (August 7, 1958 – February 13, 2019) was a Russian swimming coach, honored as "Honored Coach of Russia".

== Biography ==
Aschepkova was the coach of Andrey Korneyev, who won a bronze medal at the 1996 Summer Olympics (in the 200m breaststroke)—finishing behind Hungarian swimmers Károly Güttler and Norbert Rózsa. Under her guidance, Korneyev also became a medalist at the World Championships and a European champion.

She died on 13 February 2019 in Omsk at the age of 60.

She was buried at the cemetery in the village of Privetnaya.

== Personal life ==
Nadezhda Ashchepkova drew inspiration and found elements of mentoring her students in music - she played guitar and sang for her students, loved ones, and herself.

Her daughter Olga became a top-category coach at Sports school № 6 in Omsk.

== Students about the Coach ==
Nadezhda Alexandrovna could motivate with a stern look and a firm word. (Anton Dontsov, trained with Nadezhda Ashchepkova from 1994 to 1999)

She possessed tremendous working capacity, vitality, energy, and optimism. (Alexander Kubrin, trained with Nadezhda Ashchepkova from 1990 to 1999, coaching experience since 2002)
