= Boris Družinin =

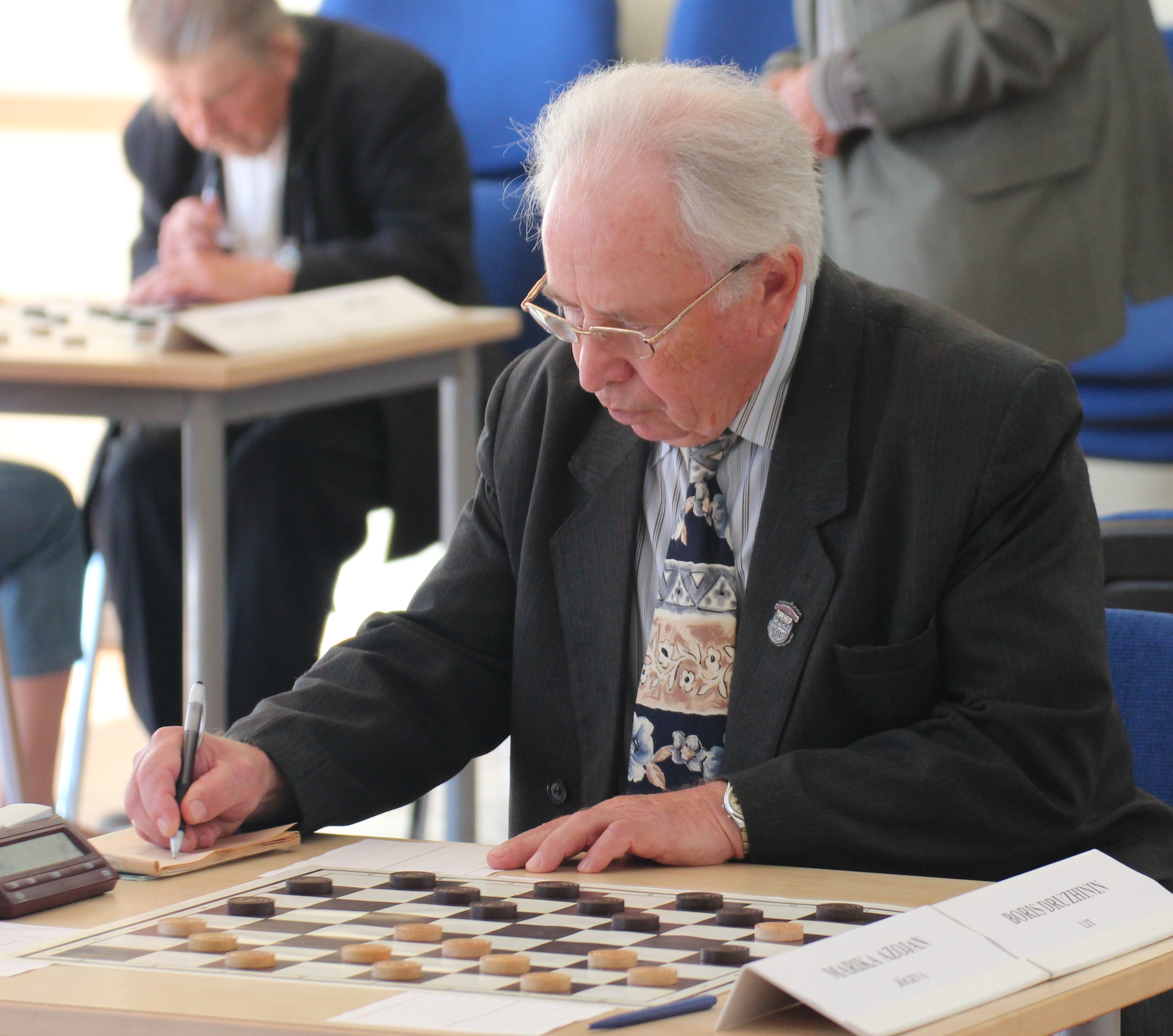
Družinin in 2012

Boris Ivanovich Druzhinin (Russian: Борис Иванович Дружинин, Lithuanian: Borisas Družininas; born 21 October 1938) is a Russian-born Soviet and Lithuanian draughts player (International draughts), referee, author of books on draughts. He is an Honored Coach of the USSR.

Soldier of the USSR and Russia. As a player he was a champion of the USSR. In Nizhny Tagil founded the first USSR specialized children's and youth checker sports school. After that he lived for a long time in Ukraine (Sumy and Zaporozhye). Boris moved to Lithuania for permanent residence in 1990. He currently lives in Mažeikiai.

Academician of the St. Petersburg International Chess and Checkers Academy since 2002.
