= Ivanusa =

Ivanusa and Ivanuša are Slavic surnames. Notable people with the surname include:

- Dmytro Ivanusa (born 25 August 1972) is a Ukrainian swimmer.
- Lara Ivanuša (born 9 January 1997) is a Slovenian women's international footballer
- Marcel Ivanusa (born January 16, 1985) is a Slovenian retired footballer
