= Spartak Volgograd (sports school) =

Spartak-Volgograd sports school
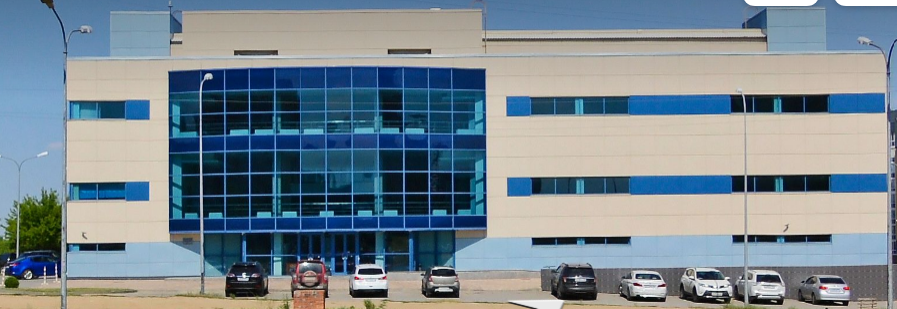

Location
- 8th Air Army St, 12, Volgograd, Russia; 48°44′53.93″N 44°30′31.16″E

Information
- Type: State Autonomous Institution of Additional Education
- Established: July 28, 2010; 16 years ago
- Principal: Alexander Petrovich Uvarov
- Website: spartak-volgograd.com

Spartak Volgograd is a Russian Olympic reserve sports school that trains athletes in swimming, water polo, and diving and is located in the city of Volgograd. It was established on 28 July 2010 on the premises of the Spartak Volgograd water polo club.

== Swimming ==
Competitive swimming in Volgograd dates back to 1925, when a mass swim was held from the island of Krit to the Yacht Club (now the river terminal). Valentin Kamensky won, and 30 people participated. That same year, the first long-distance swim along the Volga, 35 versts (37 km) long, took place — this was the first such swim in the Soviet Union.

In 1922, the first organization to manage physical education and sports was established in Tsaritsyn (the former name of Volgograd). A technical school for physical education opened in 1925, and swimming was included in the curriculum in 1927. Viktor Bukatin, a graduate of the Moscow Institute of Physical Education, became the instructor, making a significant contribution to the development of swimming and water polo in the region.

As early as 1928, Stalingrad swimmers won the Volga Cities Match in Samara and successfully competed at the Spartakiad in Moscow.

In the 1930s and 1940s, swimming was actively developing at the city's factories and enterprises, including Barrikady, Krasny Oktyabr, the Stalingrad Tractor Plant, and Stalgres. During this period, traditions of mass sports and the training of elite athletes were established.

In the 1970s, with the opening of new pools, such as at the Volgograd Shipyard, swimming became even more popular and accessible in various districts of the city, including the Krasnoarmeysky District.

The Volgograd swimming school became one of the strongest in Russia and the world. In 1992, the Volgograd Oblast Swimming Federation was founded, bringing together the region's best athletes. That same year, coach Viktor Avdienko founded the Volga club. Volgograd swimmers have won 24 Olympic medals, over 200 medals at World Championships and World Cups, and over 100 medals at European Championships. Notable alumni include Yevgeny Sadovy (three gold medals at the 1992 Olympics), Denis Pankratov (two gold medals at the 1996 Olympics), and Aleksandr Popov (two gold medals at the 1992 and 1996 Olympics). At the 2016 Summer Olympics, graduates of the program won two bronze medals (Evgeny Rylov and Anton Chupkov).

== Water Polo ==
The Stalingrad Water Polo School was established before World War 2. Stalingrad water polo players began competing in water polo competitions as early as 1928. The official starting point is considered to be 1936, when the Stalingrad team began regularly competing in major Russian and Soviet tournaments. In 1937, the Burevestnik Voluntary Sports Society team became one of the strongest teams in the USSR.

Yevgeny Petrovich Dementyev, one of the first Honored Coaches of the RSFSR, made a significant contribution to the development of youth water polo. His students competed for the USSR, Commonwealth of Independent States, and Russian national teams. Youth sections operated in the Vodnik, Burevestnik, Trud, and Spartak sports societies. Reserve teams were trained by such coaches as V. Panasenko, V. Lychagin, V. Nesterkov, and G. Smirnov.

In 1976, a children's and youth sports school was opened at the Spartak Voluntary Sports Society's water polo section. Former Spartak players and USSR Masters of Sport participated in the school's development. In 1983, the school was certified as a specialized Olympic reserve youth school focused on training water polo players for the major league team. Over more than 35 years, the school has trained dozens of Masters of Sport and members of national teams.

In January 1994, with the support of Lukoil and the Geteks agricultural holding, the professional sports club Lukoil-Spartak was founded, with Valery Mikhailovich Prigoda as president. The team was led by Alexander Sergeyevich Glinyanov until 2005, succeeded by Vladimir Karabutov (1992 Olympic bronze medalist).

The club quickly came to dominate Russian water polo, taking 3rd place in the 1994 Russian Championship and becoming 12-time Russian Champion (1997, 1999, 2003, 2004, 2010–2017, 2023)

In 2010, the club opened its Aquatics Center, with a modern swimming pool that meets international standards. The club includes two men's and one women's team, an Olympic reserve training department, and a youth program.

=== Notable achievements ===
Spartak Volgograd is Russia's most decorated water polo club:

- 12-time Russian Champion (1997–2017, 2023)
- Multi-time winner of Russian Cup and Super Cup
- European Cup winner (2014), European Super Cup finalist (2014)
- Women's team: Repeated medalist in Russian Championships/Cups
- Russian Championship 5 gold, 7 silver, 3 bronze (1994–2010)
- Russian Cup 8 wins (1998, 2000–2004, 2007, 2009)
- Olympics 4 silver (2000), 7 bronze (2004)
- European Championships 5 bronze (1997)
- World University Games 8 silver, 2 bronze (2001, 2011)
- Athletes from "Lukoil-Spartak" propelled Russia to Olympic podiums, World League/Cup victories, and European Championships, boosting Volgograd's global sports reputation.

== Diving ==
The Volgograd diving school traces its roots back to the Soviet era, fueled by nationwide initiatives to develop aquatic sports. Beginning in the 1950s, dedicated pools and sports schools were established in Volgograd and Volzhsky, laying the groundwork for coaching traditions and diver training. This positioned Volgograd as a center of Russia's aquatic sports.

In recent decades, the Olympic Reserve Sports School No. 8 has become Volgograd's primary talent incubator. Its athletes successfully compete in regional and national competitions.

The Volgograd Oblast State Autonomous Institution of Sports Training historically housed a dedicated diving department. It provided high-level training facilities and support for competitions at various levels until administrative restructuring in later years.

=== Notable achievements ===
Notable alumni from School No. 8 include:

- Yulia Koltunova: Silver medalist at the 2004 Athens Olympics.
- Uliana Kliueva: 2019 European Champion, World Junior Champion, Silver medalist at the 2018 Youth Olympics, 5-time Russian Champion.
