= Ralf Braun =

German swimmer

Personal information
- Full name: Ralf Braun
- Nationality: Germany
- Born: 24 January 1973 (age 53) East Berlin, East Germany
- Height: 1.92 m (6 ft 4 in)
- Weight: 86 kg (190 lb)

Sport
- Sport: Swimming
- Strokes: Backstroke
- Club: Wasserfreunde Spandau 04, Berlin
Medal record
Men's swimming
Representing Germany
World Championships (LC)
Silver medal – second place	1998 Perth	200 m backstroke
European Championships (LC)
Gold medal – first place	1999 Istanbul	200 m backstroke
Silver medal – second place	1997 Seville	4×100 m medley
Bronze medal – third place	1997 Seville	200 m backstroke

Ralf Braun (born 24 January 1973 in Berlin) is a retired backstroke swimmer from Germany, who competed for his native country at two consecutive Summer Olympics, starting in 1996 (Atlanta, Georgia).

A member of Wasserfreunde Spandau 04 he is best known for winning the gold medal at the 1999 European Swimming Championships in the men's 200 m backstroke event. He also claimed the silver medal in the 4×100 m medley relay, two years earlier, alongside Jens Kruppa, Thomas Rupprath and Christian Tröger.
