= Michael Kühne =

German diver (born 1971)

Personal information
- Nationality: German
- Born: 7 March 1971 (age 55) Dresden, East Germany

Sport
- Sport: Diving
Medal record
Men's diving
Representing Germany
World Championships
Silver medal – second place	1998 Perth	10 m synchro
European Championships
Gold medal – first place	1997 Seville	10 m synchro

Michael Kühne (born 7 March 1971) is a German diver. He competed at the 1992 Summer Olympics and the 1996 Summer Olympics.
