= Aleksey Kriventsov =

Belarusian swimmer

Personal information
- Born: 28 March 1974 (age 52)

Sport
- Sport: Swimming

Aleksey Kriventsov or Alyaksey Kriwentsow (Belarusian: Аляксей Іванавіч Крiўенцоў, born 28 March 1974) is a Belarusian swimmer. He competed in the men's 100 metre breaststroke event at the 1996 Summer Olympics.
