= Olga Landik =

Russian swimmer

Personal information
- Born: 2 January 1980 (age 46)
- Height: 1.69 m (5 ft 7 in)
- Weight: 57 kg (126 lb)

Sport
- Sport: Swimming
- Club: Dynamo St. Petersburg
Medal record
Women's swimming
Representing Russia
European Championships
Silver medal – second place	1997 Seville	4×100 m medley

Olga Eduardovna Landik (Russian: Ольга Эдуардовна Ландик; born 2 January 1980) is a retired Russian breaststroke swimmer who won a silver medal in the 4×100 m medley relay at the 1997 European Aquatics Championships. She also competed in the 100 m breaststroke at the 1996 Summer Olympics.

Landik started swimming in a club since 1987, and in 1994 won a gold medal at the Junior European Championships. During her career she won 10 national senior titles. After retirement, she worked as a swimming coach (1998–2000) and then as a stylist. In 2003, she graduated with honors from a Sports Academy and later enrolled to the Saint Petersburg State Polytechnical University.
