= Letizia Nuzzo =

Italian synchronized swimmer

Personal information
- Born: November 12, 1976 (age 49) Rome, Italy

Sport
- Sport: Synchronised swimming
Medal record
Representing Italy
European Championships
Bronze medal – third place	1997 Seville	Team

Letizia Nuzzo (born 12 November 1976) is an Italian former synchronized swimmer who competed in the 1996 Summer Olympics.
