= 1997 FINA Short Course World Championships – Men's 4 × 100 metre medley relay =

The finals and the qualifying heats of the Men's 4 × 100 metres Medley Relay event at the 1997 FINA Short Course World Championships were held on the first day of the competition, on Thursday 17 April 1997 in Gothenburg, Sweden.

== Finals ==
Rank	Final	Time
	Australia; Adrian Radley; Phil Rogers; Geoff Huegill; Michael Klim	3:30.66 WR; 52.72; 59.39; 51.35; 47.20
	Russia; Vladimir Selkov; Stanislav Lopukhov; Denis Pankratov; Roman Yegorov	3:32.56 ER; 53.10; 59.16; 51.38; 48.72
	Great Britain; Martin Harris; Richard Maden; James Hickman; Mark Foster	3:32.61
4.	Germany	3:34.28
5.	Sweden	3:35.99
6.	United States	3:36.06
7.	Canada	3:36.93
—	China	DSQ

== Qualifying heats ==
Rank	Heats	Time
1.	Australia	3:34.91
2.	Great Britain	3:35.09
3.	Russia	3:35.53
4.	Germany	3:35.78
5.	Sweden	3:35.99
6.	China	3:36.84
7.	United States	3:37.00
8.	Canada	3:37.21
9.	Brazil	3:39.48
10.	Cuba	3:41.21
11.	Switzerland	3:44.02
12.	South Africa	3:44.08
13.	Lithuania	3:48.92
14.	New Zealand	3:49.22
15.	Uzbekistan	3:50.60
16.	Estonia	3:55.41

== See also ==
- 1996 Men's Olympic Games 4 × 100 m Medley Relay
- 1997 Men's European LC Championships 4 × 100 m Medley Relay
