= 1996 European Short Course Swimming Championships =

Water sport competitions

- Host city: Rostock, Germany
- Date(s): 13–15 December 1996
- Nations participating: 21

The first edition of the European Short Course Championships was held in Rostock, Germany, from December 13 to December 15, 1996. The event, just a couple of months after the Summer Olympics in Atlanta, Georgia, replaced the European Sprint Swimming Championships, where only the 50 m events and the 100 m individual medley were at stake. From this edition on, also the events longer than that were contested.

== Medal table ==
* Host nation (Germany)

Rank	Nation	Gold	Silver	Bronze	Total
1	Germany (GER)*	14	14	11	39
2	Great Britain (GBR)	4	4	2	10
3	Netherlands (NED)	4	2	2	8
4	Sweden (SWE)	3	3	3	9
5	Poland (POL)	3	2	1	6
6	Italy (ITA)	2	2	1	5
7	Czech Republic (CZE)	2	1	2	5
8	Norway (NOR)	1	1	2	4
9	Slovakia (SVK)	1	1	1	3
10	Austria (AUT)	1	1	0	2
11	Belarus (BLR)	1	0	2	3
12	Spain (ESP)	1	0	1	2
13	Ukraine (UKR)	1	0	0	1
14	Romania (ROM)	0	3	1	4
15	Croatia (CRO)	0	2	1	3
16	Switzerland (SUI)	0	1	3	4
17	Slovenia (SLO)	0	1	2	3
18	Bulgaria (BUL)	0	0	1	1
18	Finland (FIN)	0	0	1	1
18	France (FRA)	0	0	1	1
18	Greece (GRE)	0	0	1	1
Totals (21 entries)		38	38	39	115

== Medal summary ==
=== Men's events ===
Event	Gold		Silver		Bronze	
50 m freestyle	Mark Foster; Great Britain	22.25	René Gusperti; Italy	22.51	Dimitri Kalinovski; Belarus	22.57
100 m freestyle	Lars Conrad; Germany	48.90	Nicolae Butacu; Romania	49.49	Nicolae Ivan; Romania	49.56
200 m freestyle	Lars Conrad; Germany	1:45.97	Andrew Clayton; Great Britain	1:47.35	Konstantin Dubrovin; Germany	1:48.60
400 m freestyle	Emiliano Brembilla; Italy	3:45.52	Stefan Pohl; Germany	3:48.10	Dimitrios Manganas; Greece	3:48.29
1500 m freestyle	Igor Snitko; Ukraine	14:46.59	Ian Wilson; Great Britain	14:54.24	Thomas Lohfink; Germany	15:04.13
50 m backstroke	Mariusz Siembida; Poland	25.03	Tomislav Karlo; Croatia	25.14	Stev Theloke; Germany	25.15
100 m backstroke	Mariusz Siembida; Poland	53.56	Stev Theloke; Germany	53.87	Emanuele Merisi; Italy	54.39
200 m backstroke	Emanuele Merisi; Italy	1:54.91	Nicolae Butacu; Romania	1:56.29	Stev Theloke; Germany	1:56.51
50 m breaststroke	Patrik Isaksson; Sweden	27.76	Jens Kruppa; Germany	27.77	Daniel Málek; Czech Republic	27.84
100 m breaststroke	Jens Kruppa; Germany	1:00.15	Patrik Isaksson; Sweden	1:00.45	Aleksandr Gukov; Belarus	1:00.94
200 m breaststroke	Aleksandr Gukov; Belarus	2:09.86	Artur Paczynski; Poland	2:10.69	Jens Kruppa; Germany	2:10.70
50 m butterfly	Mark Foster; Great Britain	23.91	Fabian Hieronimus; Germany	24.07	Jonas Åkesson; Sweden	24.25
100 m butterfly	Thomas Rupprath; Germany	53.22	Fabian Hieronimus; Germany	53.70	Denislav Kaltchev; Bulgaria	54.02
200 m butterfly	Chris-Carol Bremer; Germany	1:57.04	Thomas Rupprath; Germany	1:57.30	David Abrard; France; Adrian Andermatt; Switzerland	1:59.23
100 m individual medley	Marcel Wouda; Netherlands	54.62	Jens Kruppa; Germany	54.82	Christian Keller; Germany	55.45
200 m individual medley	Marcel Wouda; Netherlands	1:56.83	Christian Keller; Germany	1:58.52	Krešimir Čač; Croatia	2:01.45
400 m individual medley	Marcel Wouda; Netherlands	4:08.90	Christian Keller; Germany	4:13.03	Uwe Volk; Germany	4:15.69
4 × 50 m freestyle relay	Germany; Lars Conrad; Christian Tröger; Tim Nolte; Steffen Smöllich	1:29.54	Croatia; Tomislav Karlo; Miloš Milošević; Miro Žeravica; Alen Lončar	1:29.69	Norway; Anders Dahl; Vermund Vetnes; Thomas Sopp; Thomas Nore	1:30.40
4 × 50 m medley relay	Germany; Stev Theloke; Jens Kruppa; Fabian Hieronimus; Lars Conrad	1:38.28	Italy; Emanuele Merisi; Domenico Fioravanti; Luca Belfiore; René Gusperti	1:38.50	Great Britain; Neil Willey; Richard Maden; Mark Foster; Simon Handley	1:38.72

=== Women's events ===
Event	Gold		Silver		Bronze	
50 m freestyle	Sandra Völker; Germany	24.67; ER	Sue Rolph; Great Britain	25.32	Vibeke Johansen; Norway	25.38
100 m freestyle	Sandra Völker; Germany	53.04; ER	Sue Rolph; Great Britain	54.46	Martina Moravcová; Slovakia	54.95
200 m freestyle	Martina Moravcová; Slovakia	1:57.22	Antje Buschschulte; Germany	1:58.34	Carla Geurts; Netherlands	1:59.16
400 m freestyle	Kristýna Kyněrová; Czech Republic	4:09.94	Carla Geurts; Netherlands	4:10.36	Chantal Strasser; Switzerland	4:13.45
800 m freestyle	Carla Geurts; Netherlands	8:34.66	Flavia Rigamonti; Switzerland	8:39.20	Sarah Collings; Great Britain	8:42.42
50 m backstroke	Sandra Völker; Germany	27.94	Antje Buschschulte; Germany	28.55	Suze Valen; Netherlands	28.66
100 m backstroke	Antje Buschschulte; Germany	1:00.21	Kateřina Pivoňková; Czech Republic	1:01.69	Alenka Kejžar; Slovenia	1:01.93
200 m backstroke	Kateřina Pivoňková; Czech Republic	2:08.15	Antje Buschschulte; Germany	2:09.54	Alenka Kejžar; Slovenia	2:12.20
50 m breaststroke	Vera Lischka; Austria	31.36	Terrie Miller; Norway	31.47	Hanna Jaltner; Sweden	32.04
100 m breaststroke	Terrie Miller; Norway	1:07.91	Vera Lischka; Austria	1:08.18	Alicja Pęczak; Poland	1:08.33
200 m breaststroke	Alicja Pęczak; Poland	2:26.11	Alenka Kejžar; Slovenia	2:27.33	Anne Poleska; Germany	2:27.57
50 m butterfly	Johanna Sjöberg; Sweden	27.15; ER	Sandra Völker; Germany	27.23	Marja Pärssinen; Finland	27.69
100 m butterfly	Johanna Sjöberg; Sweden	58.80; ER	Sandra Völker; Germany	59.44	Julia Voitowitsch; Germany	1:00.51
200 m butterfly	Bárbara Franco; Spain	2:10.20	Johanna Sjöberg; Sweden	2:10.92	María Peláez; Spain	2:11.36
100 m individual medley	Sue Rolph; Great Britain	1:01.91	Martina Moravcová; Slovakia	1:01.98	Sabine Herbst; Germany	1:02.46
200 m individual medley	Sue Rolph; Great Britain	2:10.60	Alicja Pęczak; Poland	2:13.07	Sabine Herbst; Germany	2:13.29
400 m individual medley	Sabine Herbst; Germany	4:39.26	Beatrice Câșlaru; Romania	4:41.76	Pavla Chrástová; Czech Republic	4:42.07
4 × 50 m freestyle relay	Germany; Katrin Meissner; Marianne Hinners; Silvia Stahl; Sandra Völker	1:41.15	Sweden; Johanna Sjöberg; Linda Olofsson; Nelly Jörgensen; Malin Svahnström	1:42.18	Switzerland; Dominique Diezi; Andrea Quadri; Sandrine Paquier; Chantal Strasser	1:44.90
4 × 50 m medley relay	Germany; Antje Buschschulte; Sylvia Gerasch; Julia Voitowitsch; Sandra Völker	1:51.79; ER	Netherlands; Suze Valen; Madelon Baans; Wilma van Hofwegen; Angela Postma	1:52.80	Sweden; Nelly Jörgensen; Hanna Jaltner; Johanna Sjöberg; Linda Olofsson	1:53.06
