= Andrey Ivanov (swimmer) =

Russian swimmer

Personal information
- Born: 28 May 1976 (age 50)

Sport
- Sport: Swimming
Medal record
Representing Russia
World Championships (SC)
Bronze medal – third place	2000 Athens	200m breaststroke

Andrey Ivanov (born 28 May 1976) is a Russian swimmer. He competed in the men's 200 metre breaststroke event at the 1996 Summer Olympics.
