= Brunella Carrafelli =

Italian former synchronized swimmer

Personal information
- Born: September 16, 1977 (age 48) Rome, Italy

Sport
- Sport: Synchronised swimming
Medal record
Representing Italy
European Championships
Bronze medal – third place	1995 Vienna	Team competition
Bronze medal – third place	1997 Seville	Team competition

Brunella Carrafelli (born 16 September 1977) is an Italian former synchronized swimmer who competed in the 1996 Summer Olympics.
