= Viktor Avdienko =

Russian swimming coach

Viktor Borisovich Avdienko
- Born: June 22, 1958 (age 67); Volgograd, Soviet Union
- Occupation: Swimming coach
- Awards: Honored Coach of Russia; Honored coach of the USSR; Order of Honour (Russia); Order "For Merit to the Fatherland" IV degree; Honored Worker of Physical Culture of the Russian Federation; Russian Federation Presidential Certificate of Honour (2013); Presidential Certificate of Gratitude (2009); Certificate of Honour of the Government of the Russian Federation (2006)

Viktor Borisovich Avdienko (Russian: Виктор Борисович Авдиенко; born 22 June 1958, Volgograd) is a Soviet and Russian athlete, Master of Sport of the USSR in swimming, Honored coach of the USSR and Russia.

== Biography ==
He graduated from the Volgograd State Institute of Physical Culture in 1979. He was awarded the honorary title "Master of Sport of the USSR" in swimming in 1975, after which he began coaching. He participated in the sports preparation of the USSR national team from 1988 and also coached the Unified Team at the 1992 Summer Olympics and the Russian national team at the 1996 Summer Olympics. He was the head coach of the national team at the 2000 Summer Olympics. He was recognized as the Best Coach of Russia in 1993 and the Best Swimming Coach in the World from 1992 to 1996.

== Notable students ==
- Yevgeny Sadovyi - won three gold medals at the 1992 Summer Olympics at Barcelona, multiple champion of World Championships and was subsequently chosen by Swimming World magazine as the Male World Swimmer of the Year (1992).
- Denis Pankratov - Two-time Olympic champion. Multiple former world record holder. Multiple champion of World Championships. Two-time Swimming World Swimmer of the Year (1995 - 1996).
- Vladimir Selkov - won a total number of three silver medals at the Summer Olympics, individual medal at the Barcelona Games in 1992, in the 200 m backstroke.
- Roman Ivanovsky - won the silver medal in the 4×100 metres medley relay at the 1996 Summer Olympics in Atlanta, Georgia. Multiple medalist at World Championships.
- Vladimir Morozov - Olympic medalist, the former world record holder, multiple champion at World Championships.
- Olga Kirichenko - Ukrainian former swimmer who competed in the 1992 Summer Olympics, multiple champion at USSR Championships.

== Contribution to sport and swimming ==
- Creation of one of the world's best swimming complexes in Volgograd, which became a unique training base for athletes.
- Development and implementation of scientifically based training methods, including innovative research in the areas of biological age of athletes (based on hormonal background), hydrodynamics, and training process management.
- Authorship of more than 25 scientific works and textbooks on the theory and methodology of swimming, which are used by coaches and athletes in Russia and abroad.
- Long-term work as the head coach of the Russian national team, participation in preparing teams for the 1988, 1992, 1996, and 2000 Olympic Games.
- Active involvement in the leadership of the swimming federation of the Volgograd region and the All-Russian Swimming Federation, including the position of First Vice-president.
- Contribution to the development of Russian swimming through strategic programs for training reserves and raising the level of young athletes.

== Current activities ==
He is currently the First Vice-president of the Russian Swimming Federation, President of the Volgograd Region Swimming Federation, and President of the Volga Volgograd Swimming Club.

He is the author of over 25 scientific works, including educational manuals on the theory and methodology of swimming.

== Awards ==
- Best Swimming Coach in the World (1996, 1997)
- Best Swimming Coach of Russia (1993)
- Order "For Merit to the Fatherland" IV degree (August 26, 1996) — for services to the state and a significant personal contribution to the development of domestic sports
- Order of Honour (Russia) (April 12, 2023) — for contributions to the development of physical culture and sports, and long-term conscientious work
- Honored Worker of Physical Culture of the Russian Federation (July 25, 2007) — for contributions to the development of physical culture and sports and long-term conscientious work
- Russian Federation Presidential Certificate of Honour (February 2, 2013) — for successful preparation of athletes who achieved high sports results at the Games of the XXX Olympiad 2012 in London (UK)
- Presidential Gratitude (November 30, 2009) — for long-term conscientious work
- Certificate of Honour of the Government of the Russian Federation (July 7, 2006) — for a significant personal contribution to the development of Russian sports and high achievements in coaching
