= Miro Žeravica =

Croatian swimmer (born 1972)

Personal information
- Full name: Miro Žeravica
- Nationality: Croatia
- Born: 18 April 1972 (age 54)

Sport
- Sport: Swimming
- Strokes: Butterfly, Freestyle
Medal record
Representing Croatia
Men's swimming
European Championships (SC)
Silver medal – second place	1996 Rostock	4×50 m freestyle
Gold medal – first place	1999 Lisboa	50 m backstroke

Miro Žeravica (born 18 April 1972) is a retired Croatian swimmer.

Žeravica was born in Split, where he started his swimming career. He later moved to Zagreb.

His greatest success was winning the 1999 European short course gold in 50 m backstroke, ahead of his compatriot Tomislav Karlo.

As of 2015, Žeravica is head coach of Galatasaray SK swimming in Istanbul.

== Sources ==
- Žeravica još uvijek nije svjestan da je europski prvak (in Croatian)
- Najljepša nagrada za duge godine treninga i odricanja (in Croatian)
- Proglašeni naj sportaši Siska u 2008. godini (in Croatian)
