= Mauricio Moreno =

Colombian swimmer

Personal information
- Born: 15 March 1977 (age 48)

Sport
- Sport: Swimming

Mauricio Moreno (born 15 March 1977) is a Colombian swimmer. He competed in the men's 100 metre breaststroke event at the 1996 Summer Olympics.
