= Mark Warnecke =

German swimmer (born 1970)

Personal information
- Full name: Mark Warnecke
- Nationality: German
- Born: 15 February 1970 (age 56) Bochum, North Rhine-Westphalia, West Germany
- Height: 1.87 m (6 ft 2 in)
- Weight: 100 kg (220 lb)

Sport
- Sport: Swimming
- Strokes: Breaststroke
- Club: Sportgemeinschaft Essen
Medal record
Men's swimming
Representing Germany
Event	1st	2nd	3rd
Olympic Games	0	0	1
World Championships (LC)	1	0	0
World Championships (SC)	2	0	0
European Championships (LC)	2	2	1
European Championships (SC)	9	2	3
Total	14	4	5
Olympic Games
Bronze medal – third place	1996 Atlanta	100 m breaststroke
World Championships (LC)
Gold medal – first place	2005 Montreal	50 m breaststroke
World Championships (SC)
Gold medal – first place	1995 Rio de Janeiro	100 m breaststroke
Gold medal – first place	2000 Athens	50 m breaststroke
European Championships (LC)
Gold medal – first place	1999 Istanbul	50 m breaststroke
Gold medal – first place	2000 Helsinki	50 m breaststroke
Silver medal – second place	1999 Istanbul	100 m breaststroke
Silver medal – second place	1999 Istanbul	4×100 m medley
Bronze medal – third place	1995 Vienna	4×100 m medley
European Championships (SC)
Gold medal – first place	1994 Stavanger	50 m breaststroke
Gold medal – first place	1994 Stavanger	4×50 m medley
Gold medal – first place	1998 Sheffield	50 m breaststroke
Gold medal – first place	1998 Sheffield	4×50 m medley
Gold medal – first place	2000 Valencia	50 m breaststroke
Gold medal – first place	2002 Riesa	4×50 m medley
Gold medal – first place	2003 Dublin	4×50 m medley
Gold medal – first place	2004 Vienna	4×50 m medley
Gold medal – first place	2005 Trieste	4×50 m medley
Silver medal – second place	1998 Sheffield	100 m breaststroke
Silver medal – second place	2002 Riesa	50 m breaststroke
Bronze medal – third place	1993 Gateshead	50 m breaststroke
Bronze medal – third place	2003 Dublin	50 m breaststroke
Bronze medal – third place	2003 Dublin	4×50 m medley

Mark Warnecke (born 15 February 1970 in Bochum, North Rhine-Westphalia) is a German former breaststroke swimmer who, at age 35, won the world title in the 50 m breaststroke at the 2005 World Aquatics Championships in Montreal. That made him the oldest swimming world champion since 1971. He started for the German swimming club SG Essen.

Warnecke competed in four consecutive Summer Olympics for his native country, starting in 1988 in Seoul, South Korea, where he was a member of the 4×100 m medley relay team, that finished in fourth position. Eight years later, he won the bronze medal in the 100 m breaststroke, at the 1996 Summer Olympics in Atlanta, Georgia.

== See also ==
- List of German records in swimming
- World record progression 50 metres breaststroke
