= 1997 European Aquatics Championships =

Water sport competitions

- Host city: Seville
- Country: Spain
- Sport: 5
- Events: 51
- Opening: 19 August 1997
- Closing: 24 August 1997
- Main venue: Centro Deportivo San Pablo

The 1997 LEN European Aquatics Championships were held in Seville, Spain from Tuesday 19 August to Sunday 24 August, in the 50 m pool of the Centro Deportivo San Pablo. The 23rd edition of the event was organised by the LEN. Besides swimming there were titles contested in open water swimming, diving, synchronized swimming (women) and – for the last time – water polo.

The swimming championships resulted in two European records: Ágnes Kovács on the women's 200 m breaststroke and Russia in the men's 4 × 100 m freestyle relay. Alexander Popov returned in competition after being stabbed down in Moscow, shortly after the 1996 Summer Olympics in Atlanta, Georgia.

== Medal table ==
* Host nation (Spain)

Rank	Nation	Gold	Silver	Bronze	Total
1	Russia	16	9	3	28
2	Germany	15	8	10	33
3	Hungary	4	1	2	7
4	Italy	3	5	5	13
5	Netherlands	2	2	3	7
6	Spain*	2	2	2	6
7	Ireland	2	2	0	4
8	Great Britain	2	1	3	6
9	Belarus	2	0	1	3
10	France	1	7	4	12
11	Sweden	1	3	3	7
12	Denmark	1	0	2	3
13	Ukraine	0	6	3	9
14	Slovakia	0	3	0	3
15	Poland	0	1	1	2
16	Israel	0	1	0	1
16	Yugoslavia	0	1	0	1
18	Czech Republic	0	0	3	3
19	Belgium	0	0	2	2
20	Austria	0	0	1	1
20	Finland	0	0	1	1
20	Romania	0	0	1	1
Totals (22 entries)		51	52	50	153

== Swimming ==
=== Men's events ===
Event	Gold	Silver	Bronze
50 m freestyle	Alexander Popov; Russia	(United Kingdom) Mark Foster; Great Britain	Julien Sicot; France
100 m freestyle	Alexander Popov; Russia	Lars Frölander; Sweden	Oleg Rykhlevich; Belarus
200 m freestyle	(United Kingdom) Paul Palmer; Great Britain	Massimiliano Rosolino; Italy	Béla Szabados; Hungary
400 m freestyle	Emiliano Brembilla; Italy	Massimiliano Rosolino; Italy	(United Kingdom) Paul Palmer; Great Britain
1500 m freestyle	Emiliano Brembilla; Italy	Igor Snitko; Ukraine	Denis Zavhorodny; Ukraine
100 m backstroke	Martin López-Zubero; Spain	Eithan Urbach; Israel	Vladimir Selkov; Russia
200 m backstroke	Vladimir Selkov; Russia	Emanuele Merisi; Italy	Ralf Braun; Germany
100 m breaststroke	Aleksandr Gukov; Belarus	Károly Güttler; Hungary	Daniel Málek; Czech Republic
200 m breaststroke	Aleksandr Gukov; Belarus	Andrey Korneyev; Russia	Daniel Málek; Czech Republic
100 m butterfly	Lars Frölander; Sweden	Denys Sylantyev; Ukraine	Franck Esposito; France
200 m butterfly	Franck Esposito; France	Denys Sylantyev; Ukraine	(United Kingdom) Stephen Parry; Great Britain
200 m individual medley	Marcel Wouda; Netherlands	Xavier Marchand; France	Jani Sievinen; Finland
400 m individual medley	Marcel Wouda; Netherlands	Frederik Hviid; Spain	Robert Seibt; Germany
4 × 100 m freestyle relay	Russia; Alexander Popov; Roman Yegorov; Denis Pimankov; Vladimir Pyshnenko	Germany; Alexander Lüderitz; Steffen Zesner; Christian Tröger; Torsten Spanneberg	Netherlands; Bram van Haandel; Martijn Zuijdweg; Mark Veens; Pieter van den Hoogenband
4 × 200 m freestyle relay	Great Britain; Paul Palmer; Andrew Clayton; Gavin Meadows; James Salter	Netherlands; Pieter van den Hoogenband; Mark van der Zijden; Martijn Zuijdweg; Marcel Wouda	Germany; Lars Conrad; Christian Keller; Stefan Pohl; Steffen Zesner
4 × 100 m medley relay	Russia; Vladimir Selkov; Andrey Korneyev; Vladislav Kulikov; Alexander Popov	Germany; Ralf Braun; Jens Kruppa; Thomas Rupprath; Christian Tröger	Poland; Mariusz Siembida; Marek Krawczyk; Marcin Kaczmarek; Bartosz Kizierowski

=== Women's events ===
Event	Gold	Silver	Bronze
50 m freestyle	Natalya Meshcheryakova; Russia	Sandra Völker; Germany	Therese Alshammar; Sweden
100 m freestyle	Sandra Völker; Germany	Martina Moravcová; Slovakia	Antje Buschschulte; Germany
200 m freestyle	(Republic of Ireland) Michelle Smith; Ireland	Nadezhda Chemezova; Russia	Camelia Potec; Romania
400 m freestyle	Dagmar Hase; Germany	(Republic of Ireland) Michelle Smith; Ireland	Kerstin Kielgass; Germany
800 m freestyle	Kerstin Kielgass; Germany	Carla Geurts; Netherlands	Jana Henke; Germany
100 m backstroke	Antje Buschschulte; Germany	Roxana Maracineanu; France	Sandra Völker; Germany
200 m backstroke	Cathleen Rund; Germany	Antje Buschschulte; Germany	Roxana Maracineanu; France
100 m breaststroke	Ágnes Kovács; Hungary	Svitlana Bondarenko; Ukraine	Brigitte Becue; Belgium
200 m breaststroke	Ágnes Kovács; Hungary	Alicja Pęczak; Poland	Brigitte Becue; Belgium
100 m butterfly	Mette Jacobsen; Denmark	Martina Moravcová; Slovakia	Johanna Sjöberg; Sweden
200 m butterfly	María Peláez; Spain	(Republic of Ireland) Michelle Smith; Ireland	Mette Jacobsen; Denmark
200 m individual medley	Oxana Verevka; Russia	Martina Moravcová; Slovakia	Yana Klochkova; Ukraine
400 m individual medley	(Republic of Ireland) Michelle Smith; Ireland	Yana Klochkova; Ukraine	Hana Černá; Czech Republic
4 × 100 m freestyle relay	Germany; Katrin Meissner; Simone Osygus; Antje Buschschulte; Sandra Völker	Sweden; Louise Jöhncke; Josefin Lillhage; Malin Svahnström; Therese Alshammar	Russia; Svetlana Leshukova; Natalya Meshcheryakova; Inna Yaitskaya; Nadezhda Chemezova
4 × 200 m freestyle relay	Germany; Dagmar Hase; Janina Götz; Antje Buschschulte; Kerstin Kielgass	Sweden; Louise Jöhncke; Josefin Lillhage; Johanna Sjöberg; Malin Svahnström	Denmark; Britt Raaby; Berit Puggaard; Mette Jacobsen; Ditte Jensen
4 × 100 m medley relay	Germany; Antje Buschschulte; Sylvia Gerasch; Katrin Meissner; Sandra Völker	Russia; Olga Kochetkova; Olga Landik; Svetlana Pozdeyeva; Natalya Meshcheryakova	Great Britain; Sarah Price; Jaime King; Caroline Foot; Karen Pickering

== Open water swimming ==
=== Men's events ===
Event	Gold	Silver	Bronze
5 km open water	Aleksey Akatyev (RUS)	Yevgeny Bezruchenko (RUS)	Luca Baldini (ITA)
25 km open water	Aleksey Akatyev (RUS)	Christof Wandratsch (GER); Stéphane Lecat (FRA)	

=== Women's events ===
Event	Gold	Silver	Bronze
5 km open water	Peggy Büchse (GER)	Valeria Casprini (ITA)	Rita Kovács (HUN)
25 km open water	Rita Kovács (HUN)	Valeria Casprini (ITA)	Edith van Dijk (NED)

== Diving ==
=== Men's events ===
Event	Gold	Silver	Bronze
1 m springboard	Andreas Wels; Germany	Holger Schlepps; Germany	Rafael Álvarez; Spain
3 m springboard	Dmitri Sautin; Russia	Andreas Wels; Germany	Stefan Ahrens; Germany
10 m platform	Jan Hempel; Germany	Yaroslav Makogin; Ukraine	Heiko Meyer; Germany
3 m springboard synchro	Holger Schlepps; Alexander Mesch; Germany	José Luis Hidalgo; Rubén Santos; Spain	Donald Miranda; Nicola Marconi; Italy
10 m platform synchro	Jan Hempel; Michael Kühne; Germany	Igor Lukashin; Aleksandr Varlamov; Russia	Frédéric Pierre; Gilles Emptoz-Lacote; France

=== Women's events ===
Event	Gold	Silver	Bronze
1 m springboard	Vera Ilyina; Russia	Irina Lashko; Russia	Dörte Lindner; Germany
3 m springboard	Yuliya Pakhalina; Russia	Vera Ilyina; Russia	Anna Lindberg; Sweden
10 m platform	Olga Khristoforova; Russia	Annika Walter; Germany	Svitlana Serbina; Ukraine
3 m springboard synchro	Claudia Bockner; Conny Schmalfuss; Germany	Irina Lashko; Yuliya Pakhalina; Russia	Julia Cruz; Dolores Sáez; Spain
10 m platform synchro	Ute Wetzig; Anke Piper; Germany	Julie Danaux; Odile Arboles-Souchon; France	Marion Reiff; Anja Richter; Austria

== Synchronized swimming ==
Event	Gold	Silver	Bronze
Solo	Olga Sedakova; Russia	Virginie Dedieu; France	Giovanna Burlando; Italy
Duet	Olga Brusnikina; Mariya Kiselyova; Russia	Virginie Dedieu; Myriam Lignot; France	Giada Ballan; Serena Bianchi; Italy
Team	Russia; Elena Azarova; Elena Barantseva; Olga Brusnikina; Natalia Gruzdeva; Mariya Kiselyova; Olga Medvedeva; Olga Novokshchenova; Anna Yuriaeva	France; Agnes Berthet; Virginie Dedieu; Julie Fabre; Myriam Lignot; Isabelle Manable; Delphine Marechal; Charlotte Massardier; Eva Riffet	Italy; Giada Ballan; Serena Bianchi; Giovanna Burlando; Brunella Carrafelli; Chiara Cassin; Alessia Lucchini; Letizia Nuzzo; Clara Porchetto

== Water polo ==
=== Men's team event ===
Event	Gold	Silver	Bronze
Team competition	Hungary	Yugoslavia	Russia

=== Women's team event ===
Event	Gold	Silver	Bronze
Team competition	Italy	Russia	Netherlands
