= Vladislav Aminov =

Russian swimmer (born 1977)

Personal information
- Born: August 19, 1977 (age 48)

Sport
- Sport: Swimming
- Strokes: Backstroke
Medal record
Representing Russia
FINA World Championships
Bronze medal – third place	2001 Fukuoka	4x100m medley relay
European Championships
Gold medal – first place	2000 Helsinki	4x100m medley relay

Vladislav Aminov (born 19 August 1977) is a Russian former swimmer who competed in the 2000 Summer Olympics.
