= Dmytro Ivanusa =

Ukrainian swimmer

Personal information
- Born: 25 August 1972 (age 52)

Sport
- Sport: Swimming

Dmytro Ivanusa (born 25 August 1972) is a Ukrainian swimmer. He competed in the men's 200 metre breaststroke event at the 1996 Summer Olympics.
