= Nicolae Butacu =

Romanian swimmer (born 1974)

Personal information
- Nationality: Romania
- Born: 15 July 1974 (age 51)

Sport
- Sport: Swimming
- Strokes: backstroke and freestyle
Medal record
World Championships (SC)
| Bronze medal – third place | 1995 Rio | 4×100 m freestyle |
European Championships (LC)
| Silver medal – second place | 1995 Vienna | 200 m backstroke |
European Championships (SC)
| Silver medal – second place | 1996 Rostock | 100 m freestyle |
| Silver medal – second place | 1996 Rostock | 200 m backstroke |

Nicolae Butacu (born 15 July 1974) is a retired freestyle and backstroke swimmer from Romania, who represented his native country at the 1996 Summer Olympics in Atlanta, Georgia. He is best known for winning two silver medals at the 1996 European SC Championships in Rostock.
