= Santiago Castellanos =

Spanish swimmer

Personal information
- Born: July 7, 1977 (age 49)

Sport
- Sport: Swimming
- Strokes: Breaststroke

Santiago Castellanos (born 7 July 1977) is a Spanish former swimmer who competed in the 2000 Summer Olympics.
