= Oleksandr Dzhaburiya =

Ukrainian swimmer

Personal information
- Born: 25 September 1972 (age 53) Ukrainian SSR, Soviet Union

Sport
- Sport: Swimming

Oleksandr Dzhaburiya (born 25 September 1972) is a Ukrainian swimmer & freediver. He competed in two events at the 1996 Summer Olympics.. Former world record holder in breaststroke swimming.

== Links ==
- https://www.worldaquatics.com/athletes/1063624/oleksandr-dzhaburiya
- https://www.olympedia.org/athletes/50655
- https://intersportstats.com/events/3000048883
- https://www.olympics.com/en/athletes/oleksandr-dzhaburiya
- https://resources.fina.org/fina/document/2021/11/19/372d901a-2320-45cd-be7a-7af279991651/ma_2012_Records.pdf
- https://www.aidainternational.org/Events/EventRanking-1320
- http://www.todor66.com/swimming/Olympic/1996/Men_100m_Breaststroke.html
- https://www.aidainternational.org/Athletes/Profile-00000000-0000-0000-0000-000000001265
- https://freedivingranking.com/athlete/oleksandr-dzhaburiya
