= William Schmollinger =

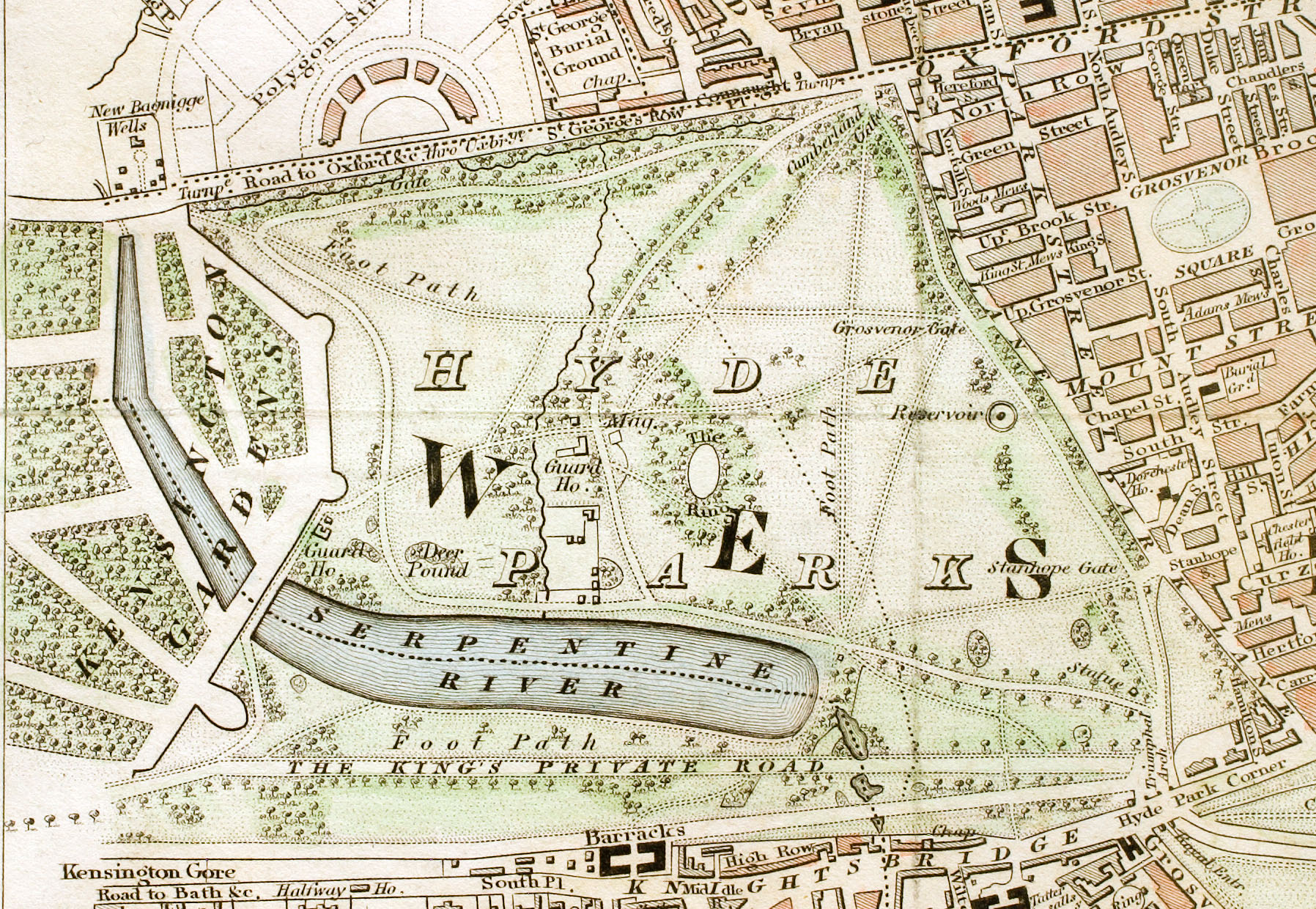
- Improved map of London for 1833, from Actual Survey. Engraved by W. Schmollinger, 27 Goswell Terrace (Hyde Park section)
- Born: 1830s
- Occupation: Cartographer

William Schmollinger (fl. 1830s) was a famous cartographer.

He engraved a map of Hertfordshire with Thomas Moule, commonly known as Moule's Map of Hertfordshire.
