= Tomislav Karlo =

Croatian swimmer (born 1970)

Medal record

Men's swimming

Representing Croatia

European Championships (SC)
Silver medal – second place	1996 Rostock	50 m backstroke
Silver medal – second place	1996 Rostock	4x50 m freestyle
Silver medal – second place	1999 Lisbon	50 m backstroke

Tomislav Karlo (born 21 December 1970 in Split, Croatia) is an Olympic backstroke swimmer from Croatia. He swam for Croatia at the 1996 Olympics.

In the early 1990s, he attended and swam for the USA's Brigham Young University. During the second half of the 1990s he won several medals at the Short Course European Championships. In 1997 during the FINA World Cup meet in Paris, France he set a European Record in 50 m backstroke with the time 24.52.

He swam for Croatia at the following international events:

- Olympics: 1996
- World Championships: 1998
- Short Course Worlds: 1997
- Short Course Europeans: 1996, 1998, 1999, 2000

As of 2011, he is the Secretary-General of the Croatian Swimming Federation.
