= Jorge Arias (swimmer) =

Peruvian swimmer

Personal information
- Full name: Jorge Armando Arias Montalvan
- Born: 24 September 1972 (age 53) Lima, Peru

Sport
- Sport: Swimming

Jorge Arias (born 24 September 1972) is a Peruvian swimmer. He competed in the men's 100 metre breaststroke event at the 1996 Summer Olympics.
