= Arūnas Savickas =

Lithuanian swimmer (born 1975)

Personal information
- Born: March 24, 1975 (age 51)

Sport
- Sport: Swimming

Arūnas Savickas (born 24 March 1975) is a retired freestyle swimmer from Lithuania, who was the oldest member (25 years, 174 days) of the national squad (5 men and 1 woman) competing at the 2000 Summer Olympics in Sydney, Australia. He competed in the men's 200 m freestyle and 200 m backstroke. In both individual events he did not reach the final. He also competed at the 1996 Summer Olympics in Atlanta, Georgia.
