= Frédérik Deburghgraeve =

Belgian swimmer (born 1973)

Personal information
- Full name: Frédérik Edouard Robert Deburghgraeve
- Nicknames: Fred, Fredje, Fredje Raketje
- Nationality: Belgium
- Born: 1 June 1973 (age 53) Roeselare, West Flanders, Belgium
- Height: 1.76 m (5 ft 9 in)
- Weight: 61 kg (134 lb)

Sport
- Sport: Swimming
- Strokes: Breaststroke
- Club: Roeselare Zwemvereniging
Medal record
Men's swimming
Representing Belgium
Olympic Games
Gold medal – first place	1996 Atlanta	100 m breaststroke
World Championships (LC)
Gold medal – first place	1998 Perth	100 m breaststroke
Bronze medal – third place	1994 Rome	100 m breaststroke
European Championships (LC)
Gold medal – first place	1995 Vienna	100 m breaststroke
Bronze medal – third place	1995 Vienna	200 m breaststroke

Frédérik Edouard Robert "Fred" Deburghgraeve (born 1 June 1973) is a former Belgian swimmer who won the gold medal in the 100 m breaststroke and set a world record during the 1996 Olympic Games in Atlanta, Georgia. After his retirement from competitive swimming he became a salesman. He was born in Roeselare, where he still lives. Deburghgraeve was trained by a Dutchman, named Ronald Gaastra.

In 2008 Deburghgraeve was inducted in the International Swimming Hall of Fame.

== See also ==
- List of members of the International Swimming Hall of Fame

Records
Preceded by Károly Güttler	World Record Holder; Men's 100 Breaststroke; 20 July 1996 – 15 June 2000	Succeeded by Roman Sloudnov
