= Patrik Isaksson (swimmer) =

Swedish swimmer

Personal information
- Full name: Patrik Isaksson
- Nationality: Sweden
- Born: 8 April 1973 (age 53) Västerås

Sport
- Sport: Swimming
- Strokes: breaststroke
Medal record
Men's swimming
Representing Sweden
| Event | 1st | 2nd | 3rd |
|---|---|---|---|
| World Championships (SC) | 2 | 2 | 0 |
| European Championships (LC) | 0 | 0 | 1 |
| European Championships (SC) | 4 | 3 | 1 |
| Total | 6 | 5 | 2 |
World Championships (SC)
| Gold medal – first place | 1997 Gothenburg | 100 m breaststroke |
| Gold medal – first place | 1999 Hong Kong | 100 m breaststroke |
| Silver medal – second place | 1999 Hong Kong | 50 m breaststroke |
| Silver medal – second place | 1999 Hong Kong | 4×100 m medley |
European Championships (LC)
| Bronze medal – third place | 1999 Istanbul | 4×100 m medley |
European Championships (SC)
| Gold medal – first place | 1996 Rostock | 50 m breaststroke |
| Gold medal – first place | 1998 Sheffield | 100 m breaststroke |
| Gold medal – first place | 1998 Sheffield | 4×50 m medley |
| Gold medal – first place | 1999 Lisbon | 4×50 m medley |
| Silver medal – second place | 1996 Rostock | 100 m breaststroke |
| Silver medal – second place | 1998 Sheffield | 50 m breaststroke |
| Silver medal – second place | 1999 Lisbon | 100 m breaststroke |
| Bronze medal – third place | 2001 Antwerp | 4×50 m medley |

Patrik Isaksson (born 8 April 1973 in Västerås) is a former breaststroke swimmer from Sweden, who won several titles in the short course championships. A member of Swedish club Västerås SS, he competed for his native country at the 2000 Summer Olympics in Sydney, Australia, where he finished in 26th position in the 100 m breaststroke.

== High performances ==
- 1995: SC World Championships

- 8th 100m breaststroke (1:01.72)
- 11th 200m breaststroke (2:15.19)

- 1996: SC European Championships

- 1st 50m breaststroke (27.76)
- 2nd 100m breaststroke (1:00.45)

- 1997: SC World Championships

- 1st 100m breaststroke (59.99)
- 5th 4×100m medley relay

- 1998: SC European Championships

- 1st 100m breaststroke (59.22)
- 2nd 50m breaststroke (27.21)

- 1999: LC European Championships

- 3rd 4×100m medley relay

- 1999: SC World Championships

- 1st 100m breaststroke (59.69)
- 2nd 50m breaststroke (27.57)
- 2nd 4×100m medley relay

- 1999: SC European Championships

- 2nd 100m breaststroke (59.32)
- 4th 50m breaststroke (27.59)
- 1st 4×50m medley relay

- 2000: Olympic Games

- 26th 100m breaststroke (1:03.05)

- 2001: LC World Championships

- 14th 50m breaststroke (28.59)

- 2001: SC European Championships

- 7th 50m breaststroke (27.31)
- 3rd 4×50m medley relay (1:35.68)

== Clubs ==
- Västerås SS
