= Honored coach of the USSR =

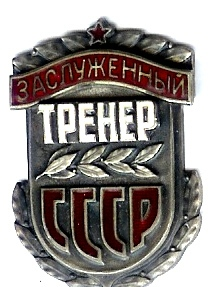
- First award: Victor Alekseev

Certificate of Honored Trainer of the USSR
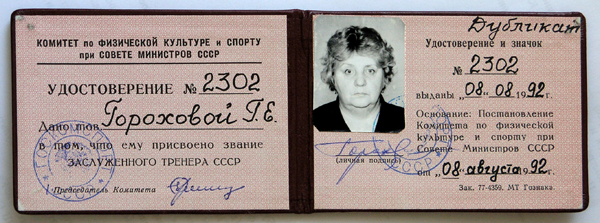
- Awarded for: Outstanding coaching achievements
- Date: 1956–1992
- Country: Soviet Union

"Honoured Coach of the Soviet Union" (standard abbreviation in sports reference literature: HCo USSR) was an honorary sports title awarded from 1956 to 1992. Between 1956-1991, the title was conferred upon distinguished Soviet coaches (prior to this, coaching achievements were recognized with the "Honoured Master of Sports of the USSR" title). In 1992, it was awarded to coaches whose trainees achieved success as part of the Unified Team.

== History ==
The title was established in 1956 to recognize exceptional coaching contributions in Soviet sports. Before this distinction, exemplary coaches could receive the "Honoured Master of Sports" title typically reserved for athletes. The criteria required nurturing athletes who achieved world-class results or contributed significantly to sports development. After the dissolution of the Soviet Union in 1991, the title was exceptionally awarded in 1992 to coaches of the Unified Team that represented former Soviet republics at the Barcelona Olympics.

=== Establishment of the Title ===
The title was established on 24 March 1956 by the Main Directorate for Physical Culture and Sports under the Ministry of Health of the USSR (at the time, the highest governing body of sport in the USSR). In the decree published in the newspaper Sovetsky Sport on 31 March 1956, it stated:

The title is awarded to coaches who have achieved outstanding success in the training and development of Masters of Sport, champions and record holders of the USSR, Europe, and the world, as well as for fruitful long-term work in the preparation of qualified athletes, the development of advanced teaching and training methods, and active participation in public life.

In execution of this decree, an official order was issued by the head of the Main Directorate.

== See also ==
- Unified Sports Classification System of the USSR and Russia
