= 1998 European Short Course Swimming Championships =

Water sport competitions

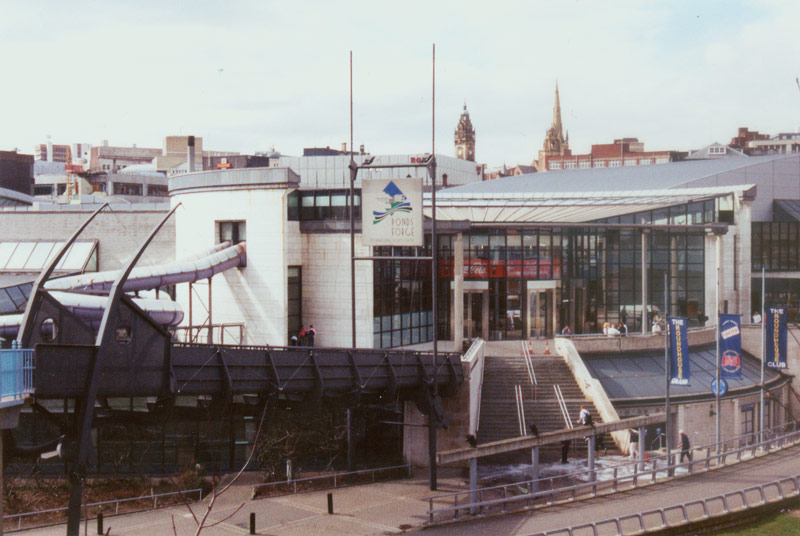
- Host city: Sheffield, UK
- Date(s): 11–13 December 1998
- Venue(s): Ponds Forge
- Nations participating: 34
- Athletes participating: 355
- Events: 38

The second edition of the European Short Course Swimming Championships was held in Ponds Forge International Sports Centre in Sheffield, England, from 11 to 13 December 1998. A total number of 355 swimmers from 34 nations competed in these championships.

== Medal table ==
* Host nation (Great Britain)

Rank	Nation	Gold	Silver	Bronze	Total
1	Germany (GER)	10	8	5	23
2	Great Britain (GBR)*	7	5	9	21
3	Netherlands (NED)	6	5	4	15
4	Sweden (SWE)	3	6	6	15
5	Slovakia (SVK)	3	1	0	4
6	Poland (POL)	3	0	0	3
7	Italy (ITA)	1	2	1	4
8	Denmark (DEN)	1	1	2	4
9	Czech Republic (CZE)	1	0	2	3
10	Finland (FIN)	1	0	1	2
11	Belgium (BEL)	1	0	0	1
11	Croatia (CRO)	1	0	0	1
11	Iceland (ISL)	1	0	0	1
11	Switzerland (SUI)	1	0	0	1
15	Spain (ESP)	0	2	2	4
15	Ukraine (UKR)	0	2	2	4
17	Austria (AUT)	0	1	2	3
18	France (FRA)	0	1	0	1
18	Lithuania (LTU)	0	1	0	1
18	Slovenia (SLO)	0	1	0	1
21	Israel (ISR)	0	0	1	1
21	Russia (RUS)	0	0	1	1
Totals (22 entries)		40	36	38	114

== Medal summary ==
=== Men's events ===
Event	Gold		Silver		Bronze	
50 m freestyle	Mark Foster; Great Britain	21.31; WR	Mark Veens; Netherlands	21.79	Pieter van den Hoogenband; Netherlands	21.87
100 m freestyle	Lars Frölander; Sweden	47.54	Pieter van den Hoogenband; Netherlands	47.68	Mark Veens; Netherlands	47.97
200 m freestyle	Pieter van den Hoogenband; Netherlands	1:44.00	Massimiliano Rosolino; Italy	1:44.92	Jacob Carstensen; Denmark	1:45.55
400 m freestyle	Emiliano Brembilla; Italy	3:40.45; ER	Massimiliano Rosolino; Italy	3:42.87	Jacob Carstensen; Denmark	3:44.56
1500 m freestyle	Graeme Smith; Great Britain	14:42.29	Igor Snitko; Ukraine	14:51.70	Emiliano Brembilla; Italy	14:53.45
50 m backstroke	Thomas Rupprath; Germany	24.13; WR	Stev Theloke; Germany	24.66	Daniel Carlsson; Sweden	24.67
100 m backstroke	Stev Theloke; Germany	52.71	Darius Grigalionis; Lithuania	53.41	Eithan Urbach; Israel	53.64
200 m backstroke	Örn Arnarson; Iceland	1:55.16	Adam Ruckwood; Great Britain	1:55.34	Jorge Sánchez; Spain	1:55.78
50 m breaststroke	Mark Warnecke; Germany	26.70; WR	Patrik Isaksson; Sweden	27.21	Patrick Schmollinger; Austria	27.60
100 m breaststroke	Patrik Isaksson; Sweden	59.22	Mark Warnecke; Germany	59.77	Jens Kruppa; Germany	59.89
200 m breaststroke	Adam Whitehead; Great Britain	2:08.54	Stéphan Perrot; France	2:09.41	Maxim Podoprigora; Austria	2:10.09
50 m butterfly	Miloš Milošević; Croatia	23.30; WR	Mark Foster; Great Britain	23.34	Lars Frölander; Sweden	23.48
100 m butterfly	James Hickman; Great Britain	51.04; WR	Lars Frölander; Sweden	51.11	Denys Sylantyev; Ukraine	51.87
200 m butterfly	James Hickman; Great Britain	1:52.96	Denys Sylantyev; Ukraine	1:54.13	Thomas Rupprath; Germany	1:54.99
100 m individual medley	Jani Sievinen; Finland	53.64	Jens Kruppa; Germany	54.00	James Hickman; Great Britain	54.45
200 m individual medley	James Hickman; Great Britain	1:56.36	Marcel Wouda; Netherlands	1:56.51	Jani Sievinen; Finland	1:57.14
400 m individual medley	Marcel Wouda; Netherlands	4:07.70	Frederik Hviid; Spain	4:12.13	Christian Keller; Germany	4:12.56
4 × 50 m freestyle relay	Netherlands; Mark Veens; Johan Kenkhuis; Stefan Aartsen; Pieter van den Hoogenband	1:26.99; WBT	Great Britain; Mark Foster; James Hickman; Simon Handley; Sion Brinn	1:27.74	Germany; Stephan Kunzelmann; Lars Conrad; Alexander Lüderitz; Carsten Dehmlow	1:28.01
4 × 50 m medley relay	Germany; Thomas Rupprath; Mark Warnecke; Alexander Lüderitz; Stephan Kunzelmann; Sweden; Daniel Carlsson; Patrik Isaksson; Jonas Åkesson; Lars Frölander	1:35.51; WBT	None		Great Britain; James Hickman; Darren Mew; Mark Foster; Sion Brinn	1:36.11

=== Women's events ===
Event	Gold		Silver		Bronze	
50 m freestyle	Inge de Bruijn; Netherlands	24.41; ER	Katrin Meissner; Germany	24.79	Sue Rolph; Great Britain	24.80
100 m freestyle	Sue Rolph; Great Britain	53.84	Martina Moravcová; Slovakia	53.93	Louise Jöhncke; Sweden	53.97
200 m freestyle	Martina Moravcová; Slovakia	1:55.12; ER	Franziska van Almsick; Germany	1:57.05	Louise Jöhncke; Sweden	1:57.39
400 m freestyle	Carla Geurts; Netherlands	4:08.05	Vicky Horner; Great Britain	4:09.02	Karen Legg; Great Britain	4:09.66
800 m freestyle	Flavia Rigamonti; Switzerland	8:27.85	Carla Geurts; Netherlands	8:29.20	Sarah Collings; Great Britain	8:33.70
50 m backstroke	Sandra Völker; Germany	27.27; WR	Therese Alshammar; Sweden	28.46	Alena Nývltová; Czech Republic	28.47
100 m backstroke	Sandra Völker; Germany	59.84	Antje Buschschulte; Germany	59.97	Alena Nývltová; Czech Republic	1.00.40
200 m backstroke	Antje Buschschulte; Germany	2.07.31	Helen Don-Duncan; Great Britain	2.09.83	Yuliya Fomenko; Russia	2.10.38
50 m breaststroke	Sylvia Gerasch; Germany	31.43	Vera Lischka; Austria	31.61	Jaime King; Great Britain	31.69
100 m breaststroke	Brigitte Becue; Belgium; Alicja Pęczak; Poland	1:07.71	None		Svitlana Bondarenko; Ukraine	1:07.86
200 m breaststroke	Alicja Pęczak; Poland	2:25.18	Lourdes Becerra; Spain	2:26.13	Anne Poleska; Germany	2:26.21
50 m butterfly	Inge de Bruijn; Netherlands	26.09; ER	Anna-Karin Kammerling; Sweden	26.30	Johanna Sjöberg; Sweden	26.76
100 m butterfly	Martina Moravcová; Slovakia	57.72; ER	Johanna Sjöberg; Sweden	58.17	Inge de Bruijn; Netherlands	58.47
200 m butterfly	Sophia Skou; Denmark	2:07.68	Mette Jacobsen; Denmark	2:07.92	Johanna Sjöberg; Sweden	2:08.21
100 m individual medley	Martina Moravcová; Slovakia	1:00.43; WR	Nataša Kejžar; Slovenia	1:02.26	Sue Rolph; Great Britain	1:02.39
200 m individual medley	Alicja Pęczak; Poland	2:12.05	Nicole Hetzer; Germany	2:13.05	Sue Rolph; Great Britain	2:13.19
400 m individual medley	Hana Černá; Czech Republic	4:36.03	Nicole Hetzer; Germany	4:36.37	Lourdes Becerra; Spain	4:39.56
4 × 50 m freestyle relay	Germany; Katrin Meissner; Simone Osygus; Marianne Hinners; Sandra Völker	1:39.56; WBT	Netherlands; Angela Postma; Nienke Valen; Wilma van Hofwegen; Inge de Bruijn	1:40.05	Great Britain; Alison Sheppard; Claire Huddart; Karen Pickering; Sue Rolph	1:40.11
4 × 50 m medley relay	Germany; Sandra Völker; Sylvia Gerasch; Franziska van Almsick; Katrin Meissner	1:50.13; WBT	Sweden; Therese Alshammar; Maria Östling; Johanna Sjöberg; Anna-Karin Kammerling	1:50.84	Netherlands; Brenda Starink; Madelon Baans; Inge de Bruijn; Angela Postma	1:51.01

== Abbreviations ==
- WR: World record
- ER: European record
- WBT: World best time (Not an official world record, because world governing body FINA doesn't recognize 4 × 50 m relay times)
