= Peter Aronsson =

Swedish historian

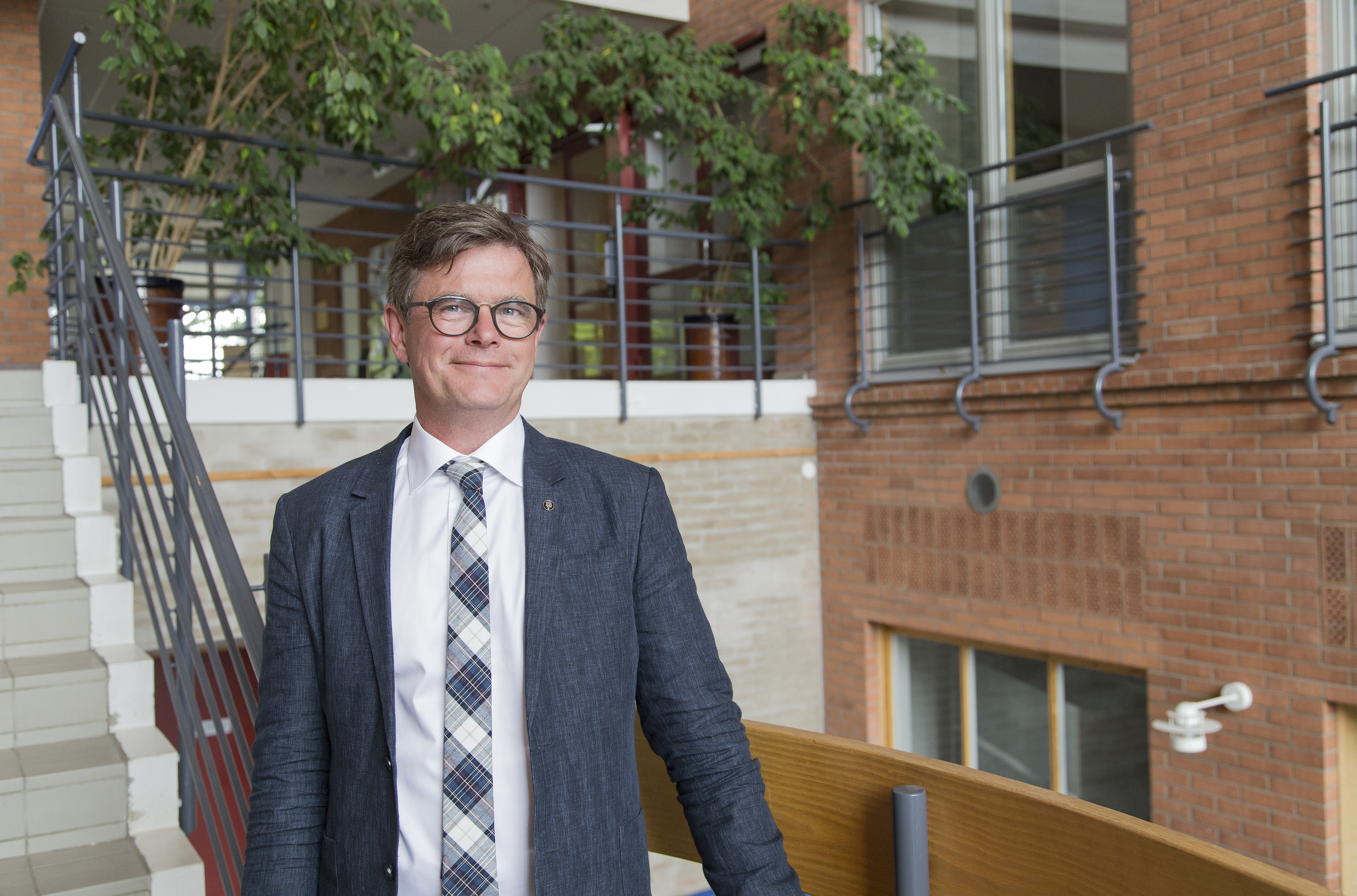
Peter Aronsson at the Växjö Campus of the Linnaeus University

Peter Aronsson (born 28 April 1959) is the Vice-Chancellor of Linnaeus University since 2017. He is a Swedish historian specializing in early-modern political culture and public history.

== Academic career ==
Peter Aronsson is born into a family of medium enterprisers in Gemla, Småland. His grandfather and father ran a toy factory in Gemla. In the late 1980s Aronsson took up doctoral studies in history at Uppsala University and later Lund University where he studied under Professor Eva Österberg. His PhD thesis, Bönder gör politik (Peasants making politics) was successfully defended in 1992. In his thesis, Aronsson argues that the Swedish political culture has been shaped through a local practice with roots centuries back in time. After the completion of the thesis, Aronsson worked as a teacher and researcher at the Department of Humanities of Växjö College (from 1999, Växjö University). In 1999 he was promoted to full professor in history. Aronsson's research was increasingly geared towards questions of how the past has been used in various contexts. In 1994 he published a textbook that summarized his ideas, Historiebruk - att använda det förflutna (Uses of history - to use the past). In 2001 he took leave from Växjö University for a position as "Professor in Uses of History and Cultural Heritage" at Linköping University. During his tenure in Linköping he was involved in a major comparative European project about the significance of national museums for state and nation formation. The project was carried out with support from the European Union between 2010 and 2012, and resulted in several publications.

== Career as academic leader ==
Växjö University was merged with Kalmar College in 2010, and became the Linnaeus University. Returning from Linköping, Peter Aronsson was employed as the Dean of the Faculty of Arts and Humanities in 2013. He filled this post until the end of 2015, and took up the position of Deputy Vice-Chancellor on 1 January 2016. When the Vice-Chancellor Stephen Hwang left his position in 2017, Peter Aronsson was employed as Acting Vice-Chancellor, and eventually as the regular successor from October 2017.

Apart from his university positions, Peter Aronsson is a member of Kungliga Vitterhetsakademin (Royal Academy of Learning), and Smålands Akademi (Academy of Småland). He has been a board member of the Historical Association of Kronoberg County.
