= Bartosz Sikora =

Polish swimmer

Personal information
- Born: 16 December 1975 (age 50) Gdynia, Poland

Sport
- Sport: Swimming

Bartosz Sikora (born 16 December 1975) is a retired Polish backstroke and freestyle swimmer. He competed in two events at the 1996 Summer Olympics.
