= Roman Ivanovsky =

Russian swimmer

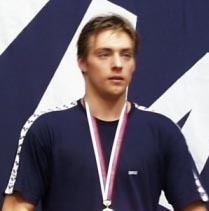

Personal information
- Full name: Roman Gennadyevich Ivanovsky
- Nationality: Russia
- Born: 29 June 1977 (age 49) Volgograd, Russian SFSR, Soviet Union
- Height: 1.87 m (6 ft 2 in)
- Weight: 80 kg (176 lb)

Sport
- Sport: Swimming
- Strokes: Breaststroke
- Club: Central Sport Klub Army, Volgograd
- Coach: Viktor Avdienko
Medal record
Men's swimming
Representing Russia
Olympic Games
Silver medal – second place	1996 Atlanta	4×100 m medley
World Championships (LC)
Silver medal – second place	2003 Barcelona	4×100 m medley
World Championships (SC)
Bronze medal – third place	2000 Athens	100 m breaststroke
Summer Universiade
Silver medal – second place	2003 Daegu	4×100 m medley

Roman Gennadyevich Ivanovsky (Russian: Роман Геннадьевич Ивановский; born 29 June 1977) is a retired male breaststroke swimmer from Russia, who won the silver medal in the 4×100 metres medley relay at the 1996 Summer Olympics in Atlanta, Georgia. He only swam in the preliminary heats, and was replaced in the final by Stanislav Lopukhov.
