= Patrick Schmollinger =

Austrian swimmer

Personal information
- Full name: Patrick Schmollinger
- Nationality: Austria
- Born: 2 September 1973 (age 52) Waiblingen, Baden-Württemberg
- Height: 1.83 m (6 ft 0 in)
- Weight: 76 kg (168 lb)

Sport
- Sport: Swimming
- Strokes: Breaststroke
- Club: SU Salzburg
Medal record
European Championships (SC)
Bronze medal – third place	1998 Sheffield	50 m breaststroke

Patrick Schmollinger (born 2 September 1973 in Waiblingen, Baden-Württemberg) is a retired male breaststroke swimmer from Austria, who was born in Germany. He represented Austria at the 2000 Summer Olympics in Sydney, Australia, finishing in 22nd place in the men's 100m breaststroke event.
