= Andrey Korneyev =

Russian swimmer

Personal information
- Full name: Андрей Корнеев
- Nationality: Russia
- Born: 10 January 1974 Omsk, Russian SFSR
- Died: 2 May 2014 (aged 40) Moscow, Russian Federation
- Height: 1.90 m (6 ft 3 in)
- Weight: 80 kg (176 lb)

Sport
- Sport: Swimming
- Strokes: Breaststroke
- Club: Central Sport Klub Army, Moscow-Omsk
- Coach: Nadezhda Aschepkova
Medal record
Men's swimming
Representing Russia
Olympic Games
Bronze medal – third place	1996 Atlanta	200 m breaststroke
European Championships (LC)
Gold medal – first place	1995 Vienna	200 m breaststroke
Gold medal – first place	1995 Vienna	4×100 m medley
Gold medal – first place	1997 Seville	4×100 m medley
Silver medal – second place	1997 Seville	200 m breaststroke
Bronze medal – third place	1993 Sheffield	200 m breaststroke
World Championships (SC)
Silver medal – second place	1997 Göteborg	200 m breaststroke

Andrey Korneyev (Russian: Андрей Корнеев; 10 January 1974 – 2 May 2014) was a breaststroke swimmer from Russia, who won the bronze medal in the men's 200 m breaststroke event at the 1996 Summer Olympics in Atlanta, United States. A year earlier he captured the gold medal in the same event at the 1995 European Championships in Vienna, Austria.

Korneyev died on 2 May 2014 of cancer in Moscow at the age of 40.

== Other sources ==
- Evans, Hilary; Gjerde, Arild; Heijmans, Jeroen; Mallon, Bill; et al. "Andrey Korneyev". Olympics at Sports-Reference.com. Sports Reference LLC. Archived from the original on 2020-04-17.
