= Jorge Sánchez (swimmer) =

Spanish swimmer

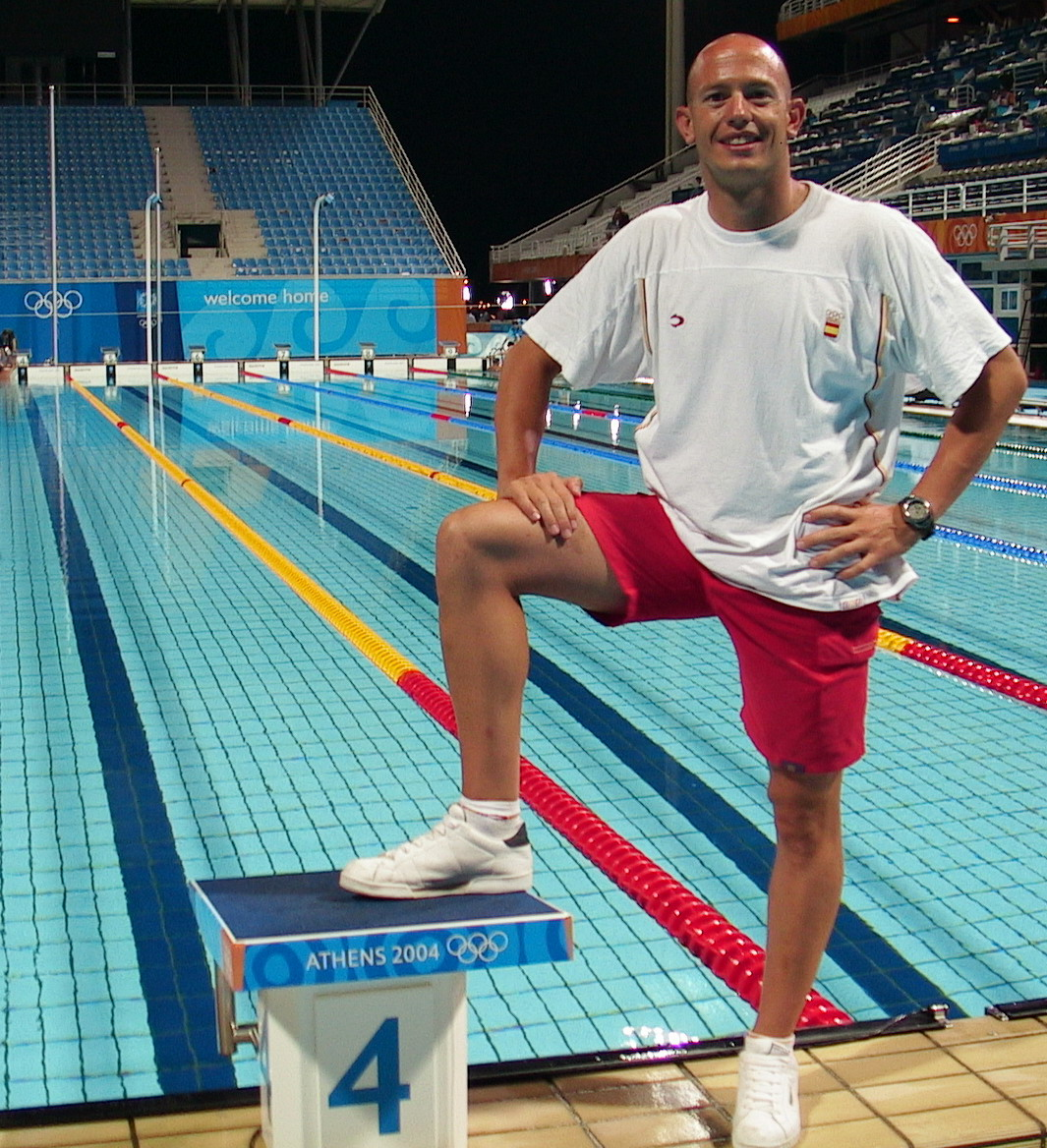
- 2004 Olympic Games

Personal information
- Born: February 9, 1977 (age 49) Zaragoza

Sport
- Sport: Swimming
Medal record
Representing Spain
Mediterranean Games
Bronze medal – third place	2001 Tunis	200m backstroke

Jorge Sánchez (born 9 February 1977) is an Olympic backstroke swimmer from Spain. He swam for Spain at the:

- Olympics: 2004
- World Championships: 1998, 2003
- Mediterranean Games: 2001
- European Championships: 1997
- Short Course Europeans: 1998
