= Jean-Christophe Sarnin =

French swimmer

Personal information
- Full name: Jean-Christophe Sarnin
- Nationality: France
- Born: 2 April 1976 (age 50) Lyon, Rhône-Alpes, France
- Height: 1.85 m (6 ft 1 in)
- Weight: 80 kg (180 lb)

Sport
- Sport: Swimming
- Strokes: Breaststroke
- Club: Alliance Dijon Natation
Medal record
Men's swimming
Representing France
World Championships (LC)
Silver medal – second place	1998 Perth	200 m breaststroke

Jean-Christophe Sarnin (born 2 April 1976 in Lyon, Rhône) is a retired male breaststroke swimmer from France, who represented his native country at the 1996 Summer Olympics in Atlanta, United States. He won the silver medal in the men's 200m breaststroke at the 1998 World Aquatics Championships in Perth, Australia.
