= Károly Güttler =

Hungarian swimmer (born 1968)

Personal information
- Full name: Güttler Károly
- Nationality: Hungarian
- Born: 15 June 1968 (age 58) Budapest
- Height: 1.88 m (6 ft 2 in)
- Weight: 85 kg (187 lb)

Sport
- Sport: Swimming
- Strokes: Breaststroke
- Club: Újpesti Dózsa Sportegyesület; Budapesti Rendészeti Sportegyesület; Budapesti Spartacus Sport Club
Medal record
Men's swimming
Representing Hungary
Olympic Games
Silver medal – second place	1988 Seoul	100 m breaststroke
Silver medal – second place	1996 Atlanta	200 m breaststroke
World Championships (LC)
Silver medal – second place	1994 Rome	100 m breaststroke
Bronze medal – third place	1994 Rome	200 m breaststroke
European Championships (LC)
Gold medal – first place	1993 Sheffield	100 m breaststroke
Silver medal – second place	1993 Sheffield	200 m breaststroke
Silver medal – second place	1993 Sheffield	4×100 m medley
Silver medal – second place	1995 Vienna	100 m breaststroke
Silver medal – second place	1995 Vienna	200 m breaststroke
Silver medal – second place	1995 Vienna	4×100 m medley
Silver medal – second place	1997 Seville	100 m breaststroke
Bronze medal – third place	1999 Istanbul	50 m breaststroke
Bronze medal – third place	2002 Berlin	50 m breaststroke

Károly Güttler (born 15 June 1968 in Budapest) is a former breaststroker from Hungary, who represented his native country at four consecutive Olympics, beginning with the 1988 Summer Olympics in Seoul and ending with the 2000 Summer Olympics in Sydney, Australia. He won the silver medal in the 100 m and 200 m breaststroke, once each, both at separate Games.

Güttler enjoyed a productive year in 1993 when he won gold and silver in the 100 m and 200 m breaststroke respectively at the European Championships in Sheffield, United Kingdom. He broke the 100 m breaststroke world record in the semifinal, with 1:00.95. This record stood until 1996. This led to him being awarded the World Swimmer of the Year and European Swimmer of the Year by Swimming World Magazine.

== Awards ==
- Hungarian swimmer of the Year (2): 1993, 1999
- Swimming World Magazine – World Swimmer of the Year (1): 1993
- Immortal of Hungarian swimming (2015)

Records
Preceded by Norbert Rózsa	World Record Holder; Men's 100 Breaststroke; 3 August 1993 – 20 July 1996	Succeeded by Fred Deburghgraeve
Awards
Preceded by Yevgeny Sadovyi	World Swimmer of the Year; 1993	Succeeded by Kieren Perkins
Preceded by Yevgeny Sadovyi	European Swimmer of the Year; 1993	Succeeded by Alexander Popov
