= Richard Maden =

British swimmer

Personal information
- Full name: Jonathan Richard Maden
- Nickname: Ric
- National team: Great Britain
- Born: 21 September 1972 (age 53) Littleborough, England
- Height: 1.88 m (6 ft 2 in)
- Weight: 79 kg (174 lb; 12.4 st)

Sport
- Sport: Swimming
- Strokes: Breaststroke
- Club: Rochdale Aquabears
Medal record
Men's swimming
Representing Great Britain
World Championships (SC)
Bronze medal – third place	1997 Gothenburg	4×100 m medley
European Championships (SC)
Bronze medal – third place	1996 Riesa	4×50 m medley
Representing England
Commonwealth Games
Silver medal – second place	1998 Kuala Lumpur	medley relay

Jonathan Richard Maden (born 21 September 1972) is a male English former competitive swimmer who specialised in breaststroke events.

== Swimming career ==
He represented Great Britain in the Olympics, FINA world championships and European championships, and England in the Commonwealth Games. At the 1996 Summer Olympics in Atlanta, Georgia, he finished ninth in the men's 100-metre breaststroke in a time of 1:02.51.

He represented England and won a silver medal in the 4 x 100 metres medley relay event, at the 1998 Commonwealth Games in Kuala Lumpur, Malaysia.

In 1997 at the ASA National British Championships he won all three National breaststroke titles over 50 metres breaststroke, 100 metres breaststroke and the 200 metres breaststroke.

Affiliated with swimming club Rochdale Aquabears, Maden won the bronze medal in the men's 4×100-metre medley relay at the 1997 FINA Short Course World Championships, alongside Martin Harris (backstroke), James Hickman (butterfly) and Mark Foster (freestyle).

== See also ==
- List of Commonwealth Games medallists in swimming (men)
