= Marc Capdevila =

Spanish swimmer

Personal information
- Born: 12 May 1974 (age 52) Vic, Catalonia, Spain

Sport
- Sport: Swimming
- Strokes: Breaststroke

Marc Capdevila Pons (born 12 May 1974) is a former breaststroke swimmer from Spain.

He was born in Vic, Catalonia, and competed for his native country at the 1996 Summer Olympics in Atlanta, Georgia. There he finished in 15th position in the 100m Breaststroke.
