= Vadim Alekseyev =

Soviet swimmer

Personal information
- Native name: ודים אלכסייב
- National team: Soviet Union, Israel
- Born: April 11, 1970 (age 56) Almaty, Kazakh SSR, Soviet Union

Sport
- Sport: Swimming
- Strokes: breaststroke

Vadim Alekseyev (Hebrew: ודים אלכסייב, Russian: Вадим Алексеев; born April 11, 1970) is a retired Olympic breaststroke swimmer who competed for first the Soviet Union, then Israel. Alexeev was born in Almaty, Kazakh SSR, Soviet Union. He is Jewish and immigrated to Israel in 1992. He speaks Russian.

== Career ==
Alekseyev held Soviet and Israeli records in the 1990s.

He won the 100-meter and 200-meter breaststroke races at the 1986 European Junior Championships.

At the 1988 Olympics in Seoul, he took sixth in the 200-meter breaststroke with a time of 2:16.7. In 1989 he set the Soviet record in the 100-meter breaststroke (1:02.11); it was the third-fastest time in the world that year. That year he was one of the two fastest swimmers in Europe. In 1990, he won a silver medal at the Goodwill Games in the 100-meter breastroke.

At the 1994 World Championship, he set the Israeli record in the 200-meter breaststroke (2:15.47). In 1995, he set the Israeli record in the 100-meter breaststroke (1:02.52).

At the 1996 Olympics in Atlanta, he swam for Israel. There, he swam the four-man 4x100 meter medley with Yoav Bruck, Eitan Urbach, and Dan Kutler. The team reached the final, taking eighth place.

At the 2008 Olympics in Beijing, Tom Be'eri beat Alekseyev's prior Israeli record in the men's 100-meter breaststroke by one-tenth of a second (at 1:02.42).

== See also ==
- List of Jews in sports#Swimming
