= Marek Krawczyk =

Polish swimmer

Personal information
- Full name: Marek Wojciech Krawczyk
- Nationality: Poland
- Born: 23 March 1976 (age 50) Gdańsk, Pomorskie
- Height: 1.85 m (6 ft 1 in)

Sport
- Sport: Swimming
- Strokes: Breaststroke
- Club: AZS-AWF Gdańsk
Medal record
Men's swimming
Representing Poland
European Championships (LC)
Bronze medal – third place	1997 Seville	4×100 m medley

Marek Krawczyk (born 23 March 1976 in Gdańsk, Pomorskie) is a retired breaststroke swimmer from Poland, who competed for his native country at two consecutive Summer Olympics, starting in 1996 (Atlanta, Georgia).

As a member of AZS-AWF Gdańsk, he is best known for winning the bronze medal at the 1997 European Swimming Championships, in the men's 4×100 m medley relay, alongside Mariusz Siembida, Marcin Kaczmarek and Bartosz Kizierowski.
