= Stéphan Perrot =

French swimmer

Personal information
- Born: 19 June 1977 (age 49) Nice, France
- Height: 185 cm (6 ft 1 in)
- Weight: 84 kg (185 lb)

Sport
- Sport: Swimming
Medal record
Men's swimming
Representing France
European Championships (LC)
Gold medal – first place	1999 Istanbul	200 m breaststroke
Bronze medal – third place	1999 Istanbul	100 m breaststroke
European Championships (SC)
Gold medal – first place	1999 Lisbon	200 m breaststroke
Gold medal – first place	2000 Valencia	200 m breaststroke
Silver medal – second place	1998 Sheffield	200 m breaststroke
Mediterranean Games
Gold medal – first place	1997 Bari	200 m breaststroke

Stéphan Perrot (born 19 June 1977 in Nice) is a breaststroke swimmer from France, who won the gold medal in the men's 200 metres breaststroke event at the 1999 European Championships in Istanbul. He represented his native country at the 2000 Summer Olympics in Sydney, Australia, where he was eliminated in the semifinals of the men's 200 m breaststroke.
