= José Couto =

Portuguese swimmer (born 1978)

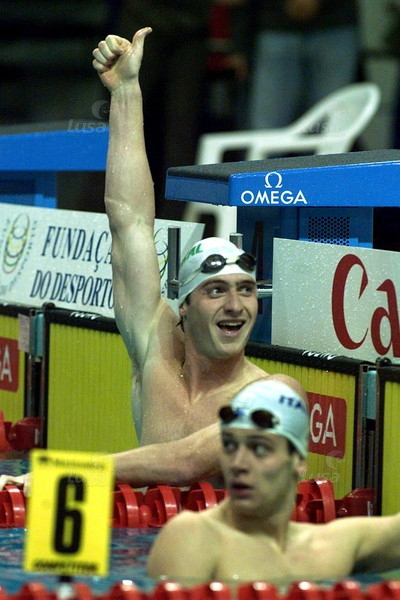

Personal information
- Nationality: Portuguese
- Born: 27 February 1978 (age 48) Lisbon, Portugal
- Height: 1.92 m (6 ft 4 in)
- Weight: 82 kg (181 lb)

Sport
- Sport: Swimming
- Strokes: Breaststroke
- Club: Sporting Clube de Portugal
Medal record
Men's swimming
Representing Portugal
World Championships (SC)
Silver medal – second place	2002 Moscow	50 m breaststroke
European Championships (SC)
Silver medal – second place	1999 Lisbon	200 m breaststroke
Bronze medal – third place	1999 Lisbon	100 m breaststroke

Jose Guilherme Couto (born 27 February 1978) is a Portuguese swimmer. He competed at the 1996 Summer Olympics, the 2000 Summer Olympics, and the 2004 Summer Olympics.

In the short course, he was Vice-World champion in 2002, and Vice-European champion in 1999, as well as winning a bronze medal at the 1999 European Short Course Championships.

Over the course of his career, he has won 108 medals, including one gold medal, and one bronze medal, at Swimming World Cup circuits.

== Background ==
Couto was born 27 February 1978 in Lisbon, and emigrated to the United States. He has one brother. When he was seventeen years old, Couto began to win big titles and became one of the best Portuguese swimmer of all time in breaststroke. Once arriving in the United States, he attended Florida Gators swimming and diving team and swam for coach Gregg Troy, and with the second-most decorated swimmer in Olympic history, Ryan Lochte from 2002 to 2005.

== International career ==
=== 1996 Summer Olympics ===
At the 1996 Summer Olympics in Atlanta, United States, he swam a 2.17.28 in the prelims of the 200-metre breaststroke to set a new Portuguese record in the event but did not advance to the final.

=== 1997 Swimming World Cup ===
Stop 1: Espoo

On the first day of the short course 1997 FINA Swimming World Cup in Espoo, Finland, Couto won a bronze medal in the 200-metre breaststroke, finishing in a time of 2.15.81 seconds with Polish Mark Krawczyk, gold medalist, and Raiko Pachel, silver medalist.

Stop 2: Malmo

At stop number two of the World Cup series, held in Malmö, Sweden, Couto improved upon his placement, this time winning the gold medal in the 200-metre breaststroke with a time of 2.14.98 seconds and sharing the podium with American Travis Myers, gold medalist, and Peter Aronsson, silver medalist.

=== 1997 European Championships ===
At the 1997 European Championships held in December 1997 in Seville, Spain, Couto placed fifth in the final, breaking the Portuguese national record with a time of 2.14.90 seconds.

=== 1998 World Championships ===
In the preliminary heats of the 200-metre breaststroke at the 1998 World Aquatics Championships on 8 January, Couto placed fourteenth in the preliminaries with a time of 2.17.51 seconds. He ranked sixth in the evening B final, swimming in a 2.18.37 seconds.

=== 1999 Swimming World Cup ===
Starting out at the first short course 1999 FINA Swimming World Cup stop in Paris, France, Couto placed 4th in the final in the 100-metre breaststroke set at 1.01.28 seconds.

=== 1999 World Short Course Championships ===
For the 1999 World Championships held 1–4 April at the Hong Kong Coliseum in Hong Kong, Couto placed 6th in the final in the 200-metre breaststroke, set at 2.09.56 seconds. Also, placed 7th in the final in the 200-metre breaststroke.

=== 1999 European Championships ===
For the 1999 European Championships held in Istanbul, Turkey from 26 July to 1 August, in the 50 m pool of the Ataköy Olympic Pool Stadium, Couto placed 7th in the final of the 200-metre breaststroke set at 2.16.05 seconds.

=== 1999 European Short Course Championships ===
The 1999 European Short Course Championships held in Complexo Desportivo do Jamor in Lisbon, Portugal, from 9 to 11 December, Couto won a silver medal in the 200-metre breaststroke with a 2.09.98, finishing 2.16 seconds behind first-place finisher Stéphan Perrot of France, and 1 second ahead of third-place finisher Adam Whitehead, bronze medalist. In the final of the 100-metre breaststroke the following day, he won the bronze medal with a time of 59.70 seconds.

=== 2000 European Championships ===
The 2000 European Championships held in 3 July to 9 July 2000 in Helsinki, Finland, Couto placed 7th in the final in the 200-metre breaststroke, in 2.16.59 seconds.

=== 2000 Summer Olympics ===
At the 2000 Summer Olympics held from 15 September to 1 October 2000 in Sydney, Australia, he swam a 1.02.79 in the prelims of the 100-metre breaststroke finishing 18th, and the 200-metre breaststroke, finishing 26th.

=== 2001 World Championships ===
At the 2001 World Championships held from 15 September to 1 October 2000 in Fukuoka, Japan, Couto placed tenth in the evening semifinals of the 200-metre breaststroke, placed eleventh in the evening semifinals of the 100-metre breaststroke, and placed fifteen in the evening semifinals of the 50-metre breaststroke.

=== 2002 World Short Course Championships ===
At the 2002 European Short Course Championships in Moscow, Russia, Couto turned in his best performance in an international tournament, winning the silver medal in the 50-metre breaststroke finishing in a time of 27.22 seconds, which was 0.80 seconds slower than the gold medalist and world record holder in the event Oleg Lisogor. In his second event, he placed 6th in the 200-metre breaststroke, finishing in a time of 2.09.14 seconds.

=== 2004 European Championships ===
The 2004 European Championships held in Madrid, Spain from 5–16 May, at the M86 Swimming Center, Couto split a 1.03.54 for the breaststroke leg of the 4×100 metre medley relay, placed ninth with a final relay time of 3:46.11 seconds.

=== 2004 Summer Olympics ===
At the 2004 Summer Olympics held from 13 to 29 August 2004 in Athens, Greece, he placed 33rd in the prelims heats of the 100-metre breaststroke with a final time of 1.03.72 seconds.

== Personal best times ==
=== Long course metres (50 m pool) ===
Event	Time	Meet	Location	Date	Ref
50 m breaststroke	28.54	2002 World Short Course Championships	Moscow, Russia	3 April 2002	
100 m breaststroke	1:02.20	1999 European Short Course Championships	Lisbon, Portugal	9 December 1999	
200 m breaststroke	2:14.90	1999 European Short Course Championships	Lisbon, Portugal	9 December 1999	

=== Short course metres (25 m pool) ===
Event	Time	Meet	Location	Date	Ref
50 m breaststroke	27.22	2002 World Short Course Championships	Moscow, Russia	3 April 2002	
100 m breaststroke	59.62	1999 European Short Course Championships	Lisbon, Portugal	9 December 1999	
200 m breaststroke	2:09.98	1999 European Short Course Championships	Lisbon, Portugal	9 December 1999	

== Swimming World Cup circuits ==
The following medals Couto has won at Swimming World Cup circuits.

Edition	Gold medals	Silver medals	Bronze medals	Total
1997	1	0	1	2
Total	1	0	1	2

== Honours and awards ==
- Bordalo Press Award, distinguished in the category of sports on 4 June 2000, at the Culturgest Grand Auditorium
- Stromp Award, distinguished three times with the Stromp Award in 1995, 96 and 97

== See also ==
- List of World Swimming Championships (25 m) medalists (men)
- List of European Short Course Swimming Championships medalists (men)
