= Jens Kruppa =

German swimmer (born 1976)

Personal information
- Full name: Jens Kruppa
- Nationality: Germany
- Born: 3 June 1976 (age 50) Freital, East Germany
- Height: 2.00 m (6 ft 7 in)
- Weight: 95 kg (209 lb)

Sport
- Sport: Swimming
- Strokes: Breaststroke and medley
- Club: Sportclub Riesa, Dresden
Medal record
Men's swimming
Representing Germany
Olympic Games
Silver medal – second place	2004 Athens	4×100 m medley
Bronze medal – third place	2000 Sydney	4×100 m medley
World Championships (LC)
Silver medal – second place	2001 Fukuoka	4×100 m medley
World Championships (SC)
Bronze medal – third place	1997 Gothenburg	100 m breaststroke
Bronze medal – third place	1997 Gothenburg	200 m breaststroke
European Championships (LC)
Silver medal – second place	1997 Seville	4×100 m medley
Bronze medal – third place	2002 Berlin	4×100 m medley
European Championships (SC)
Gold medal – first place	1996 Rostock	100 m breaststroke
Gold medal – first place	1996 Rostock	4×50 m medley
Gold medal – first place	1999 Lisbon	100 m medley
Gold medal – first place	2002 Riesa	4×50 m medley
Silver medal – second place	1996 Rostock	50 m breaststroke
Silver medal – second place	1998 Sheffield	100 m medley

Jens Kruppa (born 3 June 1976 in Freital) is an international breaststroke swimmer from Germany, who won the silver medal in the 4×100 metres medley relay at the 2004 Summer Olympics.

== See also ==
- List of German records in swimming
