= Benno Kuipers =

Dutch swimmer

Personal information
- Full name: Benno Gerrit Valentijn Kuipers
- Born: 6 March 1974 (age 52) Ede, Netherlands

Sport
- Sport: Swimming

Benno Gerrit Valentijn Kuipers (born 6 March 1974 in Ede, Gelderland) is a former breaststroke swimmer from the Netherlands. Kuipers competed for his native country in two consecutive Summer Olympics, starting in 1996 in Atlanta, Georgia.

After having missed qualification for the European LC Championships 2002 in Berlin, he retired from the international scene. He then became an assistant coach of Fedor Hes in Amsterdam. Kuipers won a total of eighteen Dutch titles during his career, which was plagued by injury.

During his swimming career, Kuipers became 18 times Dutch Champion. Currently Kuipers is known for his open water enthusiasm, he regularly trains in an Amsterdam lake called ‘De Nieuwe Meer’.
