= Aleksandr Gukov =

Belarusian swimmer

Personal information
- Born: 18 March 1972 (age 54) Minsk, Belarus
Medal record
Men's swimming
Representing Belarus
European Championships (LC)
Gold medal – first place	1997 Seville	100 m breaststroke
Gold medal – first place	1997 Seville	200 m breaststroke
World Championships (SC)
Gold medal – first place	1997 Gothenburg	200 m breaststroke
European Championships (SC)
Gold medal – first place	1996 Rostock	200 m breaststroke
Bronze medal – third place	1996 Rostock	100 m breaststroke

Aleksandr Gukov (Russian: Александр Гуков; born 18 March 1972 in Minsk) is a retired breaststroke swimmer from Belarus, who won two gold medal in the men's breaststroke events at the 1997 European Championships in Seville, Spain. He represented his native country at two consecutive Summer Olympics, starting in Atlanta, Georgia (1996).
