= Daniel Málek =

Czech swimmer

Personal information
- Born: 25 May 1973 (age 53) Gottwaldow, Czechoslovakia
Medal record
Men's swimming
Representing the Czech Republic
European Championships (LC)
| Bronze medal – third place | 1997 Seville | 100 m breaststroke |
| Bronze medal – third place | 1997 Seville | 200 m breaststroke |
European Championships (SC)
| Gold medal – first place | 2000 Valencia | 50 m breaststroke |
| Silver medal – second place | 2000 Valencia | 100 m breaststroke |
| Bronze medal – third place | 1996 Rostock | 50 m breaststroke |
| Bronze medal – third place | 2000 Valencia | 200 m breaststroke |
| Bronze medal – third place | 2001 Antwerp | 100 m breaststroke |
| Bronze medal – third place | 2001 Antwerp | 200 m breaststroke |

Daniel Málek (born 25 May 1973 in Gottwaldow) is a retired male breaststroke swimmer from the Czech Republic, who won two bronze medals in the men's breaststroke events at the 1997 European Championships in Seville, Spain. He represented his native country at three consecutive Summer Olympics, starting in Atlanta, Georgia (1996).
