= 1999 Pan Pacific Swimming Championships – Men's 100 metre backstroke =

Men's 100 metre backstroke at the 1999 Pan Pacific Swimming Championships
- Venue: Sydney International Aquatic Centre
- Dates: August 23, 1999 (heats & semifinals); August 24, 1999 (final)
- Competitors: 23 from 7 nations
- Winning time: 53.60

Medalists
| gold medal | Lenny Krayzelburg | United States |
| silver medal | Matt Welsh | Australia |
| bronze medal | Josh Watson | Australia |

The men's 100 metre backstroke competition at the 1999 Pan Pacific Swimming Championships took place on August 23–24 at the Sydney International Aquatic Centre. The last champion was Lenny Krayzelburg of US.

This race consisted of two lengths of the pool, all in backstroke.

== Records ==
Prior to this competition, the existing world and Pan Pacific records were as follows:

| World record | Jeff Rouse (USA) | 53.86 | Barcelona, Spain | July 31, 1992 |
| Pan Pacific Championships record | Lenny Krayzelburg (USA) | 54.43 | Fukuoka, Japan | August 10, 1997 |

== Results ==
All times are in minutes and seconds.

| KEY: | q | Fastest non-qualifiers | Q | Qualified | CR | Championships record | NR | National record | PB | Personal best | SB | Seasonal best |

=== Heats ===
The first round was held on August 23.

| Rank | Name | Nationality | Time | Notes |
|---|---|---|---|---|
| 1 | Lenny Krayzelburg | United States | 54.80 | Q |
| 2 | Atsushi Nishikori | Japan | 55.92 | Q |
| 3 | Keitaro Konnai | Japan | 56.07 | Q |
| 3 | Josh Watson | Australia | 56.07 | Q |
| 5 | Robert Brewer | United States | 56.09 | Q |
| 6 | Matt Welsh | Australia | 56.17 | Q |
| 7 | Mark Versfeld | Canada | 56.25 | Q |
| 8 | Brad Bridgewater | United States | 56.40 | Q |
| 9 | Ray Hass | Australia | 56.42 | Q |
| 10 | Dustin Hersee | Canada | 56.50 | Q |
| 11 | Neil Walker | United States | 56.51 | Q |
| 12 | Chris Renaud | Canada | 56.82 | Q |
| 13 | Simon Thirsk | South Africa | 56.96 | Q |
| 14 | Alex Lim | Malaysia | 57.02 | Q |
| 15 | Cameron Delaney | Australia | 57.31 | Q |
| 16 | Greg Hamm | Canada | 57.43 | Q |
| 17 | Naoya Sonoda | Japan | 57.69 | |
| 18 | Robert van der Zant | Australia | 57.90 | |
| 19 | Scott Miller | Australia | 58.02 | |
| 20 | Geoff Huegill | Australia | 58.22 | |
| 21 | Greg Main-Baillie | South Africa | 58.48 | |
| 22 | Scott Talbot-Cameron | New Zealand | 58.79 | |
| 23 | Torin Hay | New Zealand | 58.82 | |

=== Semifinals ===
The semifinals were held on August 23.

| Rank | Name | Nationality | Time | Notes |
|---|---|---|---|---|
| 1 | Lenny Krayzelburg | United States | 54.07 | Q, CR |
| 2 | Matt Welsh | Australia | 55.42 | Q |
| 3 | Robert Brewer | United States | 55.56 | Q |
| 4 | Atsushi Nishikori | Japan | 55.58 | Q |
| 5 | Keitaro Konnai | Japan | 55.70 | Q |
| 6 | Mark Versfeld | Canada | 55.83 | Q |
| 7 | Josh Watson | Australia | 55.84 | Q |
| 8 | Brad Bridgewater | United States | 56.07 | |
| 9 | Ray Hass | Australia | 56.15 | |
| 10 | Neil Walker | United States | 56.16 | |
| 11 | Chris Renaud | Canada | 56.40 | Q |
| 12 | Cameron Delaney | Australia | 56.48 | |
| 13 | Dustin Hersee | Canada | 56.52 | |
| 14 | Simon Thirsk | South Africa | 56.64 | |
| 15 | Alex Lim | Malaysia | 57.17 | |
| 16 | Greg Hamm | Canada | 57.57 | |

=== Final ===
The final was held on August 24.

| Rank | Lane | Nationality | Time | Notes |
|---|---|---|---|---|
| 1st place, gold medalist(s) | Lenny Krayzelburg | United States | 53.60 | WR |
| 2nd place, silver medalist(s) | Matt Welsh | Australia | 55.13 | |
| 3rd place, bronze medalist(s) | Josh Watson | Australia | 55.18 | |
| 4 | Robert Brewer | United States | 55.39 | |
| 5 | Atsushi Nishikori | Japan | 55.61 | |
| 6 | Keitaro Konnai | Japan | 55.62 | |
| 7 | Mark Versfeld | Canada | 55.82 | |
| 8 | Chris Renaud | Canada | 55.87 | |
