= 1999 Pan Pacific Swimming Championships – Men's 200 metre backstroke =

Men's 200 metre backstroke at the 1999 Pan Pacific Swimming Championships
- Venue: Sydney International Aquatic Centre
- Dates: August 26, 1999 (heats & semifinals); August 27, 1999 (final)
- Competitors: 23 from 10 nations
- Winning time: 1:55.87

Medalists
gold medal	Lenny Krayzelburg	United States
silver medal	Ray Hass	Australia
bronze medal	Cameron Delaney	Australia

The men's 200 metre backstroke competition at the 1999 Pan Pacific Swimming Championships took place on August 26–27 at the Sydney International Aquatic Centre. The last champion was Lenny Krayzelburg of US.

This race consisted of four lengths of the pool, all in backstroke.

== Records ==
Prior to this competition, the existing world and Pan Pacific records were as follows:

World record	Martin López-Zubero (ESP)	1:56.57	Tuscaloosa, United States	November 23, 1991
Pan Pacific Championships record	Lenny Krayzelburg (USA)	1:57.87	Fukuoka, Japan	August 12, 1997

== Results ==
All times are in minutes and seconds.

KEY:	q	Fastest non-qualifiers	Q	Qualified	CR	Championships record	NR	National record	PB	Personal best	SB	Seasonal best

=== Heats ===
The first round was held on August 26.

Rank	Name	Nationality	Time	Notes
1	Ray Hass	Australia	2:00.27	Q
2	Lenny Krayzelburg	United States	2:00.54	Q
3	Matt Welsh	Australia	2:01.15	Q
4	Cameron Delaney	Australia	2:01.36	Q
5	Josh Davis	United States	2:01.61	Q
6	Keitaro Konnai	Japan	2:01.91	Q
7	Brad Bridgewater	United States	2:02.02	Q
7	Naoya Sonoda	Japan	2:02.02	Q
9	Greg Hamm	Canada	2:02.19	Q
10	Chris Renaud	Canada	2:02.21	Q
11	Josh Watson	Australia	2:02.23	Q
12	Scott Talbot-Cameron	New Zealand	2:02.48	Q
13	Dustin Hersee	Canada	2:02.49	Q
14	Alex Lim	Malaysia	2:03.48	Q
15	Fu Yong	China	2:03.76	Q
16	Mark Versfeld	Canada	2:04.44	Q
17	Chuck Sayao	Canada	2:05.19	
18	Torin Hay	New Zealand	2:05.44	
19	Simon Thirsk	South Africa	2:05.56	
20	Atsushi Nishikori	Japan	2:07.37	
21	Greg Main-Baillie	South Africa	2:08.73	
22	Carl Probert	Fiji	2:11.14	
23	Hsu Kuo-tung	Chinese Taipei	2:16.21	

=== Semifinals ===
The semifinals were held on August 26.

Rank	Name	Nationality	Time	Notes
1	Lenny Krayzelburg	United States	1:57.41	Q, CR
2	Ray Hass	Australia	1:59.08	Q, CWR
3	Cameron Delaney	Australia	2:00.43	Q
4	Brad Bridgewater	United States	2:00.46	Q
5	Keitaro Konnai	Japan	2:00.53	Q
6	Josh Watson	Australia	2:00.80	
7	Chris Renaud	Canada	2:01.38	Q
8	Scott Talbot-Cameron	New Zealand	2:01.44	Q
9	Naoya Sonoda	Japan	2:01.53	Q
9	Dustin Hersee	Canada	2:01.53	
11	Matt Welsh	Australia	2:01.57	
12	Greg Hamm	Canada	2:01.67	
13	Fu Yong	China	2:02.67	
14	Mark Versfeld	Canada	2:02.71	
15	Josh Davis	United States	2:03.46	
16	Alex Lim	Malaysia	2:03.47	

=== Final ===
The final was held on August 27.

Rank	Lane	Nationality	Time	Notes
1st place, gold medalist(s)	Lenny Krayzelburg	United States	1:55.87	WR
2nd place, silver medalist(s)	Ray Hass	Australia	1:59.87	
3rd place, bronze medalist(s)	Cameron Delaney	Australia	1:59.98	
4	Chris Renaud	Canada	2:00.14	
5	Brad Bridgewater	United States	2:00.20	
6	Keitaro Konnai	Japan	2:00.87	
7	Naoya Sonoda	Japan	2:02.02	
8	Scott Talbot-Cameron	New Zealand	2:02.13	
