= 1999 Pan Pacific Swimming Championships – Men's 200 metre individual medley =

Men's 200 metre individual medley at the 1999 Pan Pacific Swimming Championships
- Venue: Sydney International Aquatic Centre
- Dates: August 26, 1999 (heats & semifinals); August 27, 1999 (final)
- Competitors: 23 from 10 nations
- Winning time: 2:01.01

Medalists
| gold medal | Tom Wilkens | United States |
| silver medal | Curtis Myden | Canada |
| bronze medal | Matthew Dunn | Australia |

The men's 200 metre individual medley competition at the 1999 Pan Pacific Swimming Championships took place on August 26–27 at the Sydney International Aquatic Centre. The last champion was Matthew Dunn of Australia.

This race consisted of four lengths of the pool, one each in backstroke, breaststroke, butterfly and freestyle swimming.

== Records ==
Prior to this competition, the existing world and Pan Pacific records were as follows:

| World record | Jani Sievinen (FIN) | 1:58.16 | Rome, Italy | September 11, 1994 |
| Pan Pacific Championships record | David Wharton (USA) | 2:00.11 | Tokyo, Japan | August 20, 1989 |

== Results ==
All times are in minutes and seconds.

| KEY: | q | Fastest non-qualifiers | Q | Qualified | CR | Championships record | NR | National record | PB | Personal best | SB | Seasonal best |

=== Heats ===
The first round was held on August 26.

| Rank | Name | Nationality | Time | Notes |
|---|---|---|---|---|
| 1 | Matthew Dunn | Australia | 2:02.60 | Q |
| 2 | Grant McGregor | Australia | 2:02.79 | Q |
| 3 | Curtis Myden | Canada | 2:02.86 | Q |
| 4 | Robert van der Zant | Australia | 2:03.00 | Q |
| 5 | Theo Verster | South Africa | 2:03.11 | Q |
| 6 | Justin Norris | Australia | 2:03.29 | Q |
| 7 | Tom Wilkens | United States | 2:03.52 | Q |
| 8 | Xie Xufeng | China | 2:03.54 | Q |
| 9 | Ron Karnaugh | United States | 2:04.17 | Q |
| 10 | Owen Von Richter | Canada | 2:04.20 | Q |
| 11 | Dean Kent | New Zealand | 2:04.33 | Q |
| 12 | Jo Yoshimi | Japan | 2:04.60 | Q |
| 13 | Takahiro Mori | Japan | 2:04.64 | Q |
| 14 | Trent Steed | Australia | 2:04.78 | |
| 15 | Terence Parkin | South Africa | 2:05.03 | Q |
| 16 | Han Kyu-Chul | South Korea | 2:05.81 | Q |
| 17 | Tatsuya Kinugasa | Japan | 2:06.26 | Q |
| 18 | Steven Ferguson | New Zealand | 2:06.85 | |
| 19 | Philip Weiss | Canada | 2:08.55 | |
| 20 | Brian Johns | Canada | 2:11.44 | |
| 21 | Tseng Cheng-hua | Chinese Taipei | 2:12.79 | |
| 22 | Wan Azlan Abdullah | Malaysia | 2:13.26 | |
| 23 | Hsu Kuo-tung | Chinese Taipei | 2:18.25 | |

=== Semifinals ===
The semifinals were held on August 26.

| Rank | Name | Nationality | Time | Notes |
|---|---|---|---|---|
| 1 | Curtis Myden | Canada | 2:02.38 | Q |
| 2 | Grant McGregor | Australia | 2:02.65 | Q |
| 3 | Tom Wilkens | United States | 2:02.78 | Q |
| 4 | Matthew Dunn | Australia | 2:02.87 | Q |
| 5 | Ron Karnaugh | United States | 2:03.36 | Q |
| 6 | Terence Parkin | South Africa | 2:03.51 | Q |
| 7 | Theo Verster | South Africa | 2:03.60 | Q |
| 8 | Justin Norris | Australia | 2:03.99 | |
| 9 | Xie Xufeng | China | 2:04.01 | Q |
| 10 | Jo Yoshimi | Japan | 2:04.14 | |
| 11 | Dean Kent | New Zealand | 2:04.26 | |
| 12 | Takahiro Mori | Japan | 2:04.27 | |
| 13 | Han Kyu-Chul | South Korea | 2:04.62 | |
| 14 | Robert van der Zant | Australia | 2:05.10 | |
| 15 | Tatsuya Kinugasa | Japan | 2:05.73 | |
| 16 | Owen Von Richter | Canada | 2:07.11 | |

=== Final ===
The final was held on August 27.

| Rank | Lane | Nationality | Time | Notes |
|---|---|---|---|---|
| 1st place, gold medalist(s) | Tom Wilkens | United States | 2:01.01 | |
| 2nd place, silver medalist(s) | Curtis Myden | Canada | 2:01.64 | |
| 3rd place, bronze medalist(s) | Matthew Dunn | Australia | 2:01.86 | |
| 4 | Grant McGregor | Australia | 2:03.22 | |
| 5 | Ron Karnaugh | United States | 2:03.33 | |
| 6 | Terence Parkin | South Africa | 2:03.52 | |
| 7 | Theo Verster | South Africa | 2:04.24 | |
| 8 | Xie Xufeng | China | 2:04.31 | |
