= 1997 Pan Pacific Swimming Championships – Men's 100 metre backstroke =

Men's 100 metre backstroke at the 1997 Pan Pacific Swimming Championships
- Venue: NISHI Civic Pool
- Dates: August 10, 1997 (heats & finals)
- Competitors: 17 from 8 nations
- Winning time: 54.43

Medalists
gold medal	Lenny Krayzelburg	United States
silver medal	Neil Walker	United States
bronze medal	Mark Versfeld	Canada

The men's 100 metre backstroke competition at the 1997 Pan Pacific Swimming Championships took place on August 10 at the NISHI Civic Pool. The last champion was Jeff Rouse of US.

This race consisted of two lengths of the pool, all in backstroke.

== Records ==
Prior to this competition, the existing world and Pan Pacific records were as follows:

World record	Jeff Rouse (USA)	53.86	Barcelona, Spain	July 31, 1992
Pan Pacific Championships record	Jeff Rouse (USA)	54.67	Edmonton, Canada	August 22, 1991

== Results ==
All times are in minutes and seconds.

KEY:	q	Fastest non-qualifiers	Q	Qualified	CR	Championships record	NR	National record	PB	Personal best	SB	Seasonal best

=== Heats ===
The first round was held on August 10.

Rank	Name	Nationality	Time	Notes
1	Lenny Krayzelburg	United States	54.97	QA
2	Neil Walker	United States	55.42	QA
3	Mark Versfeld	Canada	55.69	QA
4	Brad Bridgewater	United States	56.09	QA
5	Ricardo Busquets	Puerto Rico	56.38	QA
6	Adrian Radley	Australia	56.39	QA
7	Keitaro Konnai	Japan	56.83	QA
8	Wang Wei	China	56.89	QA
9	Takafumi Ohishi	Japan	57.00	QB
10	Dustin Hersee	Canada	57.04	QB
11	Hajime Itoi	Japan	57.15	QB
12	Robert van der Zant	Australia	57.23	QB
12	Ray Hass	Australia	57.24	QB
14	Tate Blahnik	United States	57.29	QB
15	Tane Strickland	New Zealand	58.30	QB
16	Juan Rodela	Mexico	58.62	QB
17	Ross Dunwoody	New Zealand	58.65	

=== B Final ===
The B final was held on August 10.

Rank	Name	Nationality	Time	Notes
9	Brad Bridgewater	United States	55.71	
10	Dustin Hersee	Canada	57.07	
11	Hajime Itoi	Japan	57.20	
12	Ray Hass	Australia	57.27	
13	Robert van der Zant	Australia	57.58	
14	Ross Dunwoody	New Zealand	58.15	
15	Tane Strickland	New Zealand	58.67	
16	Juan Rodela	Mexico	58.88	

=== A Final ===
The A final was held on August 10.

Rank	Lane	Nationality	Time	Notes
1st place, gold medalist(s)	Lenny Krayzelburg	United States	54.43	CR
2nd place, silver medalist(s)	Neil Walker	United States	55.27	
3rd place, bronze medalist(s)	Mark Versfeld	Canada	55.55	
4	Adrian Radley	Australia	56.15	
5	Keitaro Konnai	Japan	56.29	
6	Wang Wei	China	56.30	
7	Ricardo Busquets	Puerto Rico	56.35	
8	Takafumi Ohishi	Japan	56.94	
