= 1999 Pan Pacific Swimming Championships – Men's 400 metre individual medley =

Men's 400 metre individual medley at the 1999 Pan Pacific Swimming Championships
- Venue: Sydney International Aquatic Centre
- Dates: August 23, 1999 (heats & finals)
- Competitors: 15 from 8 nations
- Winning time: 4:16.54

Medalists
gold medal	Matthew Dunn	Australia
silver medal	Curtis Myden	Canada
bronze medal	Tom Wilkens	United States

The men's 400 metre individual medley competition at the 1999 Pan Pacific Swimming Championships took place on August 23 at the Sydney International Aquatic Centre. The last champion was Matthew Dunn of Australia.

This race consisted of eight lengths of the pool. The first two lengths were swum using the butterfly stroke, the second pair with the backstroke, the third pair of lengths in breaststroke, and the final two were freestyle.

== Records ==
Prior to this competition, the existing world and Pan Pacific records were as follows:

World record	Tom Dolan (USA)	4:12.30	Rome, Italy	September 11, 1994
Pan Pacific Championships record	Tom Dolan (USA)	4:14.77	Atlanta, United States	August 10, 1995

== Results ==
All times are in minutes and seconds.

KEY:	q	Fastest non-qualifiers	Q	Qualified	CR	Championships record	NR	National record	PB	Personal best	SB	Seasonal best

=== Heats ===
The first round was held on August 23.

Rank	Name	Nationality	Time	Notes
1	Trent Steed	Australia	4:19.14	Q
2	Tom Wilkens	United States	4:19.97	Q
3	Matthew Dunn	Australia	4:20.22	Q
4	Erik Vendt	United States	4:20.42	Q
5	Curtis Myden	Canada	4:20.69	Q
6	Grant McGregor	Australia	4:20.72	
7	Justin Norris	Australia	4:22.69	
8	Tatsuya Kinugasa	Japan	4:22.95	Q
9	Takahiro Mori	Japan	4:23.05	Q
10	Terence Parkin	South Africa	4:23.67	Q
11	Owen Von Richter	Canada	4:25.08	
12	Dean Kent	New Zealand	4:27.07	
13	Chuck Sayao	Canada	4:28.40	
14	Tseng Cheng-hua	Chinese Taipei	4:36.62	
15	Wan Azlan Abdullah	Malaysia	4:36.83	

=== Final ===
The final was held on August 23.

Rank	Lane	Nationality	Time	Notes
1st place, gold medalist(s)	Matthew Dunn	Australia	4:16.54	
2nd place, silver medalist(s)	Curtis Myden	Canada	4:16.77	
3rd place, bronze medalist(s)	Tom Wilkens	United States	4:18.58	
4	Trent Steed	Australia	4:19.65	
5	Terence Parkin	South Africa	4:20.79	
6	Takahiro Mori	Japan	4:23.09	
7	Erik Vendt	United States	4:24.50	
8	Tatsuya Kinugasa	Japan	4:24.88	
