= Swimming at the 1999 Pan American Games – Men's 200 metre backstroke =

Men's 200 metre backstroke at the 1999 Pan American Games
- Venue: Pan Am Pool
- Dates: August 4 (preliminaries and finals)
- Competitors: – from – nations

Medalists
Gold medal	Leonardo Costa	Brazil
Silver medal	Aaron Peirsol	United States
Bronze medal	Dan Shevchik	United States

The men's 200 metre backstroke competition of the swimming events at the 1999 Pan American Games took place on 4 August at the Pan Am Pool. The last Pan American Games champion was Brad Bridgewater of US.

This race consisted of four lengths of the pool, all in backstroke.

== Results ==
All times are in minutes and seconds.

KEY:	q	Fastest non-qualifiers	Q	Qualified	GR	Games record	NR	National record	PB	Personal best	SB	Seasonal best

=== Heats ===
The first round was held on August 4.

Rank	Name	Nationality	Time	Notes
1	Aaron Peirsol	United States	2:00.39	Q
2	Dan Shevchik	United States	2:01.58	Q
3	–	–	–	Q
4	–	–	–	Q
5	–	–	–	Q
6	–	–	–	Q
7	–	–	–	Q
8	–	–	–	Q

=== B Final ===
The B final was held on August 4.

Rank	Name	Nationality	Time	Notes
9	George Bovell	Trinidad and Tobago	2:06.64	
10	George Gleason	U.S. Virgin Islands	2:09.27	
11	Diego Gallo	Uruguay	2:11.40	
12	Daniel Casey	Ecuador	2:12.17	
13	E.A. Gil	El Salvador	2:12.97	
14	G.J. Vera	Paraguay	2:14.17	
15	Natthew Hammond	Bermuda	2:17.54	

=== A Final ===
The A final was held on August 4.

Rank	Name	Nationality	Time	Notes
1st place, gold medalist(s)	Leonardo Costa	Brazil	1:59.33	GR, SA
2nd place, silver medalist(s)	Aaron Peirsol	United States	1:59.77	
3rd place, bronze medalist(s)	Dan Shevchik	United States	2:00.27	
4	Dustin Hersee	Canada	2:01.30	
5	Mark Versfeld	Canada	2:03.52	
6	Alejandro Bermúdez	Colombia	2:03.73	
7	Neisser Bent	Cuba	2:04.06	
8	Mike Fung-A-Wing	Suriname	2:08.70	
