= 1997 Pan Pacific Swimming Championships – Men's 400 metre individual medley =

Men's 400 metre individual medley at the 1997 Pan Pacific Swimming Championships
- Venue: NISHI Civic Pool
- Dates: August 11, 1997 (heats & finals)
- Competitors: 18 from 7 nations
- Winning time: 4:16.11

Medalists
gold medal	Matthew Dunn	Australia
silver medal	Curtis Myden	Canada
bronze medal	Trent Steed	Australia

The men's 400 metre individual medley competition at the 1997 Pan Pacific Swimming Championships took place on August 11 at the NISHI Civic Pool. The last champion was Tom Dolan of US.

This race consisted of eight lengths of the pool. The first two lengths were swum using the butterfly stroke, the second pair with the backstroke, the third pair of lengths in breaststroke, and the final two were freestyle.

== Records ==
Prior to this competition, the existing world and Pan Pacific records were as follows:

World record	Tom Dolan (USA)	4:12.30	Rome, Italy	September 11, 1994
Pan Pacific Championships record	Tom Dolan (USA)	4:14.77	Atlanta, United States	August 10, 1995

== Results ==
All times are in minutes and seconds.

KEY:	q	Fastest non-qualifiers	Q	Qualified	CR	Championships record	NR	National record	PB	Personal best	SB	Seasonal best

=== Heats ===
The first round was held on August 11.

Rank	Name	Nationality	Time	Notes
1	Tom Wilkens	United States	4:20.47	QA
2	Matthew Dunn	Australia	4:21.06	QA
3	Trent Steed	Australia	4:23.97	QA
4	Ron Karnaugh	United States	4:24.20	QA
5	Steven Brown	United States	4:24.28	QA
6	Curtis Myden	Canada	4:24.29	QA
7	Tatsuya Kinugasa	Japan	4:24.56	QA
8	Wang Wei	China	4:26.41	QA
9	Ian Thorpe	Australia	4:26.42	QB
10	Robert van der Zant	Australia	4:27.71	QB
11	Philip Weiss	Canada	4:28.01	QB
12	Oliver Young	New Zealand	4:28.84	QB
13	Tom Dolan	United States	4:30.11	QB
14	Kin Ming Kwok	Hong Kong	4:30.59	QB
15	Owen Von Richter	Canada	4:30.81	QB
16	Jo Yoshimi	Japan	4:32.64	QB
17	Lik Sun Fong	Hong Kong	4:35.37	
18	Ben Scott	New Zealand	4:38.53	

=== B Final ===
The B final was held on August 11.

Rank	Name	Nationality	Time	Notes
9	Steven Brown	United States	4:24.71	
10	Owen Von Richter	Canada	4:28.11	
11	Robert van der Zant	Australia	4:29.02	
12	Oliver Young	New Zealand	4:29.19	
13	Jo Yoshimi	Japan	4:29.42	
14	Kin Ming Kwok	Hong Kong	4:30.14	
15	Ben Scott	New Zealand	4:32.67	
16	Lik Sun Fong	Hong Kong	4:38.77	

=== A Final ===
The A final was held on August 11.

Rank	Lane	Nationality	Time	Notes
1st place, gold medalist(s)	Matthew Dunn	Australia	4:16.11	
2nd place, silver medalist(s)	Curtis Myden	Canada	4:16.30	
3rd place, bronze medalist(s)	Trent Steed	Australia	4:21.07	
4	Tom Wilkens	United States	4:22.51	
5	Ron Karnaugh	United States	4:22.69	
6	Tatsuya Kinugasa	Japan	4:23.63	
7	Wang Wei	China	4:25.74	
8	Philip Weiss	Canada	4:27.72	
