= 1997 Pan Pacific Swimming Championships – Men's 200 metre backstroke =

Men's 200 metre backstroke at the 1997 Pan Pacific Swimming Championships
- Venue: NISHI Civic Pool
- Dates: August 12, 1997 (heats & finals)
- Competitors: 18 from 10 nations
- Winning time: 1:57.87

Medalists
gold medal	Lenny Krayzelburg	United States
silver medal	Mark Versfeld	Canada
bronze medal	Brad Bridgewater	United States

The men's 200 metre backstroke competition at the 1997 Pan Pacific Swimming Championships took place on August 12 at the NISHI Civic Pool. The last champion was Tripp Schwenk of US.

This race consisted of four lengths of the pool, all in backstroke.

== Records ==
Prior to this competition, the existing world and Pan Pacific records were as follows:

World record	Martin López-Zubero (ESP)	1:56.57	Tuscaloosa, United States	November 23, 1991
Pan Pacific Championships record	Tripp Schwenk (USA)	1:58.87	Atlanta, United States	August 12, 1991

== Results ==
All times are in minutes and seconds.

KEY:	q	Fastest non-qualifiers	Q	Qualified	CR	Championships record	NR	National record	PB	Personal best	SB	Seasonal best

=== Heats ===
The first round was held on August 12.

Rank	Name	Nationality	Time	Notes
1	Lenny Krayzelburg	United States	1:59.84	QA
2	Brad Bridgewater	United States	2:00.19	QA
3	Mark Versfeld	Canada	2:00.31	QA
4	Wang Wei	China	2:00.94	QA
5	Josh Davis	United States	2:01.01	QA
6	Dustin Hersee	Canada	2:02.14	QA
7	Ji Sang-jun	South Korea	2:02.43	QA
8	Tate Blahnik	United States	2:02.59	QA
9	Adrian Radley	Australia	2:02.88	QB
10	Ray Hass	Australia	2:03.45	QB
11	Keitaro Konnai	Japan	2:03.49	QB
12	Hajime Itoi	Japan	2:04.03	QB
13	Takafumi Ohishi	Japan	2:05.15	QB
14	Zane King	Australia	2:06.75	QB
15	Juan Rodela	Mexico	2:08.65	QB
16	Ross Dunwoody	New Zealand	2:10.56	QB
17	Lik Sun Fong	Hong Kong	2:11.04	
18	Felix Sutanto	Indonesia	2:12.81	

=== B Final ===
The B final was held on August 12.

Rank	Name	Nationality	Time	Notes
9	Josh Davis	United States	2:00.71	
10	Hajime Itoi	Japan	2:02.97	
11	Keitaro Konnai	Japan	2:03.42	
12	Takafumi Ohishi	Japan	2:04.83	
13	Juan Rodela	Mexico	2:08.22	
14	Lik Sun Fong	Hong Kong	2:10.54	
15	Ross Dunwoody	New Zealand	2:10.73	
–	Felix Sutanto	Indonesia	DNS	

=== A Final ===
The A final was held on August 12.

Rank	Lane	Nationality	Time	Notes
1st place, gold medalist(s)	Lenny Krayzelburg	United States	1:57.87	CR
2nd place, silver medalist(s)	Mark Versfeld	Canada	1:59.61	NR
3rd place, bronze medalist(s)	Brad Bridgewater	United States	2:00.04	
4	Wang Wei	China	2:00.50	
5	Dustin Hersee	Canada	2:01.57	
6	Adrian Radley	Australia	2:02.44	
7	Ray Hass	Australia	2:02.81	
8	Ji Sang-jun	South Korea	2:03.12	
