= 2002 Pan Pacific Swimming Championships – Men's 200 metre backstroke =

Men's 200 metre backstroke at the 2002 Pan Pacific Swimming Championships
- Venue: Yokohama International Swimming Pool
- Dates: August 27, 2002 (heats & semifinals); August 28, 2002 (final)
- Competitors: 20 from 10 nations
- Winning time: 1:56.88

Medalists
gold medal	Aaron Peirsol	United States
silver medal	Matt Welsh	Australia
bronze medal	Keith Beavers	Canada

The men's 200 metre backstroke competition at the 2002 Pan Pacific Swimming Championships took place on August 27–28 at the Yokohama International Swimming Pool. The last champion was Lenny Krayzelburg of US.

This race consisted of four lengths of the pool, all in backstroke.

== Records ==
Prior to this competition, the existing world and Pan Pacific records were as follows:

World record	Aaron Peirsol (USA)	1:55.15	Minneapolis, United States	March 20, 2002
Pan Pacific Championships record	Lenny Krayzelburg (USA)	1:55.87	Sydney, Australia	August 27, 1999

== Results ==
All times are in minutes and seconds.

KEY:	q	Fastest non-qualifiers	Q	Qualified	CR	Championships record	NR	National record	PB	Personal best	SB	Seasonal best

=== Heats ===
The first round was held on August 27.

Rank	Heat	Lane	Name	Nationality	Time	Notes
1	3	4	Aaron Peirsol	United States	1:59.40	Q
2	1	4	Takashi Nakano	Japan	2:00.26	Q
3	1	3	Keith Beavers	Canada	2:00.74	Q
4	3	3	Luke Wagner	United States	2:01.56	Q
5	1	5	Raymond Hunt	United States	2:01.93	Q
6	2	4	Matt Welsh	Australia	2:02.54	Q
7	2	5	Naoya Sonoda	Japan	2:02.76	Q
8	3	6	Scott Talbot	New Zealand	2:03.14	Q
9	1	6	Cameron Gibson	New Zealand	2:03.22	Q
10	2	3	Leigh McBean	Australia	2:03.87	Q
11	3	5	Yu Rui	China	2:04.60	Q
12	3	2	Carlos Sayao	Canada	2:04.81	Q
13	2	6	Ethan Rolff	Australia	2:05.35	Q
14	1	2	Tomomi Morita	Japan	2:05.90	Q
15	2	2	Anthony van der Kraay	New Zealand	2:06.32	Q
16	3	1	Thiago Pinto	Brazil	2:06.92	Q
17	1	7	Michael Galindo	Puerto Rico	2:07.36	
18	2	7	Mun Yew Gerald Koh	Singapore	2:09.37	
19	3	7	Gord Veldman	Canada	2:11.23	
20	2	1	Seung Gin Lee	Northern Mariana Islands	2:24.37	

=== Semifinals ===
The semifinals were held on August 27.

Rank	Heat	Lane	Name	Nationality	Time	Notes
1	2	4	Aaron Peirsol	United States	1:56.49	Q
2	1	4	Takashi Nakano	Japan	1:59.87	Q
3	1	3	Matt Welsh	Australia	1:59.97	Q
4	1	2	Leigh McBean	Australia	2:00.12	Q
5	2	5	Keith Beavers	Canada	2:00.20	Q
6	2	3	Raymond Hunt	United States	2:00.74	Q
7	2	7	Yu Rui	China	2:01.53	Q
8	2	6	Naoya Sonoda	Japan	2:01.62	Q
9	3	3	Luke Wagner	United States	2:02.27	
10	3	6	Scott Talbot	New Zealand	2:02.57	
11	1	6	Cameron Gibson	New Zealand	2:02.61	
12	2	1	Ethan Rolff	Australia	2:02.89	
13	1	7	Carlos Sayao	Canada	2:04.02	
14	1	1	Tomomi Morita	Japan	2:04.83	
15	1	8	Thiago Pinto	Brazil	2:05.26	
16	2	8	Anthony van der Kraay	New Zealand	2:06.32	

=== Final ===
The final was held on August 28.

Rank	Lane	Name	Nationality	Time	Notes
1st place, gold medalist(s)	4	Aaron Peirsol	United States	1:56.88	
2nd place, silver medalist(s)	3	Matt Welsh	Australia	1:57.69	
3rd place, bronze medalist(s)	2	Keith Beavers	Canada	1:59.35	
4	5	Takashi Nakano	Japan	2:00.08	
5	6	Leigh McBean	Australia	2:00.50	
6	7	Raymond Hunt	United States	2:00.79	
7	8	Naoya Sonoda	Japan	2:00.93	
8	1	Yu Rui	China	2:01.56	
