= 1997 Pan Pacific Swimming Championships – Men's 200 metre individual medley =

Men's 200 metre individual medley at the 1997 Pan Pacific Swimming Championships
- Venue: NISHI Civic Pool
- Dates: August 13, 1997 (heats & finals)
- Competitors: 20 from 8 nations
- Winning time: 2:01.14

Medalists
gold medal	Matthew Dunn	Australia
silver medal	Curtis Myden	Canada
bronze medal	Ron Karnaugh	United States

The men's 200 metre individual medley competition at the 1997 Pan Pacific Swimming Championships took place on August 13 at the NISHI Civic Pool. The last champion was Tom Dolan of US.

This race consisted of four lengths of the pool, one each in backstroke, breaststroke, butterfly and freestyle swimming.

== Records ==
Prior to this competition, the existing world and Pan Pacific records were as follows:

World record	Jani Sievinen (FIN)	1:58.16	Rome, Italy	September 11, 1994
Pan Pacific Championships record	David Wharton (USA)	2:00.11	Tokyo, Japan	August 20, 1989

== Results ==
All times are in minutes and seconds.

KEY:	q	Fastest non-qualifiers	Q	Qualified	CR	Championships record	NR	National record	PB	Personal best	SB	Seasonal best

=== Heats ===
The first round was held on August 13.

Rank	Name	Nationality	Time	Notes
1	Ron Karnaugh	United States	2:02.59	QA
2	Matthew Dunn	Australia	2:02.89	QA
3	Curtis Myden	Canada	2:03.27	QA
4	Wang Wei	China	2:03.60	QA
5	Josh Davis	United States	2:03.91	QA
6	Mark Versfeld	Canada	2:04.44	QA
7	Tatsuya Kinugasa	Japan	2:04.46	QA
8	Steven Brown	United States	2:05.06	QA
9	Philip Weiss	Canada	2:05.10	QB
10	Theo Verster	South Africa	2:05.12	QB
11	Robert van der Zant	Australia	2:05.42	QB
12	Zane King	Australia	2:05.85	QB
13	Jo Yoshimi	Japan	2:05.95	QB
14	Ian Thorpe	Australia	2:06.26	QB
15	Trent Steed	Australia	2:06.33	QB
16	Nate Dusing	United States	2:06.50	QB
17	Oliver Young	New Zealand	2:06.57	
18	Casey Barrett	Canada	2:08.11	
19	Nicholas Sheeran	New Zealand	2:10.34	
20	Oleg Tsvetkovskiy	Uzbekistan	2:12.07	

=== B Final ===
The B final was held on August 13.

Rank	Name	Nationality	Time	Notes
9	Zane King	Australia	2:03.95	
10	Philip Weiss	Canada	2:04.18	
11	Steven Brown	United States	2:05.23	
12	Robert van der Zant	Australia	2:05.73	
13	Jo Yoshimi	Japan	2:05.92	
14	Oliver Young	New Zealand	2:08.28	
15	Nicholas Sheeran	New Zealand	2:08.37	
16	Oleg Tsvetkovskiy	Uzbekistan	2:10.99	

=== A Final ===
The A final was held on August 13.

Rank	Lane	Nationality	Time	Notes
1st place, gold medalist(s)	Matthew Dunn	Australia	2:01.14	
2nd place, silver medalist(s)	Curtis Myden	Canada	2:01.83	
3rd place, bronze medalist(s)	Ron Karnaugh	United States	2:02.25	
4	Josh Davis	United States	2:02.90	
5	Wang Wei	China	2:03.02	
6	Tatsuya Kinugasa	Japan	2:04.58	
7	Mark Versfeld	Canada	2:04.91	
8	Theo Verster	South Africa	2:04.94	
