= 1999 Pan Pacific Swimming Championships – Men's 4 × 100 metre medley relay =

Men's 4 × 100 metre medley relay at the 1999 Pan Pacific Swimming Championships
- Venue: Sydney International Aquatic Centre
- Dates: August 29, 1999 (heats & finals)
- Winning time: 3:36.37

Medalists
gold medal	Lenny Krayzelburg, Kurt Grote, Dod Wales and Neil Walker	United States
silver medal	Mark Versfeld, Morgan Knabe, Mike Mintenko and Yannick Lupien	Canada
bronze medal	Atsushi Nishikori, Ryosuke Imai, Takashi Yamamoto and Shunsuke Ito	Japan

The men's 4 × 100 metre medley relay competition at the 1999 Pan Pacific Swimming Championships took place on August 29 at the Sydney International Aquatic Centre. The last champion was the United States.

== Records ==
Prior to this competition, the existing world and Pan Pacific records were as follows:

World record	United States (USA); Jeff Rouse (53.95); Jeremy Linn (1:00.32); Mark Henderson (52.39); Gary Hall, Jr. (48.18)	3:34.84	Atlanta, United States	July 26, 1996
Pan Pacific Championships record	United States (USA); Lenny Krayzelburg (54.74); Kurt Grote (1:00.59); Nate Dusing (52.67); Neil Walker (49.03)	3:36.93	Fukuoka, Japan	August 13, 1997

== Results ==
All times are in minutes and seconds.

KEY:	q	Fastest non-qualifiers	Q	Qualified	CR	Championships record	NR	National record	PB	Personal best	SB	Seasonal best

=== Heats ===
Heats weren't performed, as only six teams had entered.

=== Final ===
The final was held on August 29.

Rank	Name	Nationality	Time	Notes
1st place, gold medalist(s)	Lenny Krayzelburg (53.67); Kurt Grote (1:01.69); Dod Wales (52.49); Neil Walker (48.52)	United States	3:36.37	CR
2nd place, silver medalist(s)	Mark Versfeld (55.47); Morgan Knabe (1:01.54); Mike Mintenko (53.69); Yannick Lupien (49.48)	Canada	3:40.18	
3rd place, bronze medalist(s)	Atsushi Nishikori (55.72); Ryosuke Imai (1:02.14); Takashi Yamamoto (52.42); Shunsuke Ito (49.93)	Japan	3:40.21	
4	Simon Thirsk (57.08); Terence Parkin (1:03.74); Theo Verster (54.07); Nicholas Folker (50.05)	South Africa	3:45.39	
5	Scott Talbot-Cameron (58.20); Steven Ferguson (1:03.84); Nicholas Sheeran (56.02); Brad Herring (51.72)	New Zealand	3:49.78	
-	Matt Welsh (55.32); Simon Cowley (1:01.60); Geoff Huegill (51.84); Michael Klim (47.78)	Australia	DSQ	
