= Swimming at the 1999 Pan American Games – Men's 200 metre individual medley =

Men's 200 metre individual medley at the 1999 Pan American Games
- Venue: Pan Am Pool
- Dates: August 7 (preliminaries and finals)
- Competitors: from - nations

Medalists
Gold medal	Curtis Myden	Canada
Silver medal	Joe Montague	United States
Bronze medal	Owen von Richter	Canada

The men's 200 metre individual medley competition of the swimming events at the 1999 Pan American Games took place on 7 August at the Pan Am Pool. The last Pan American Games champion was Curtis Myden of Canada.

This race consisted of four lengths of the pool, one each in backstroke, breaststroke, butterfly and freestyle swimming.

== Results ==
All times are in minutes and seconds.

KEY:	q	Fastest non-qualifiers	Q	Qualified	GR	Games record	NR	National record	PB	Personal best	SB	Seasonal best

=== Heats ===
The first round was held on August 7.

Rank	Name	Nationality	Time	Notes
1	Joe Montague	United States	2:02.99	Q
2	-	-	-	Q
3	-	-	-	Q
4	Tony Kurth	United States	2:05.31	Q
5	-	-	-	Q
6	-	-	-	Q
7	-	-	-	Q
8	-	-	-	Q

=== B Final ===
The B final was held on August 7.

Rank	Name	Nationality	Time	Notes
9	George Bovell	Trinidad and Tobago	2:08.08	
10	Jeremy Knowles	Bahamas	2:09.78	
11	Gabriel Mangabeira	Brazil	2:09.90	
12	George Gleason	U.S. Virgin Islands	2:10.13	
13	José López	Mexico	2:10.34	
14	Alejandro Dubreuil	Peru	2:10.61	
15	Sebastian Thoret	Ecuador	2:12.89	
16	Daniel Casey	Ecuador	2:13.39	

=== A Final ===
The A final was held on August 7.

Rank	Name	Nationality	Time	Notes
1st place, gold medalist(s)	Curtis Myden	Canada	2:02.38	
2nd place, silver medalist(s)	Joe Montague	United States	2:03.08	
3rd place, bronze medalist(s)	Owen von Richter	Canada	2:03.80	
4	Stephan Baptista	Brazil	2:06.20	
5	Tony Kurth	United States	2:06.29	
6	Javier Díaz	Mexico	2:07.60	
7	Alejandro Bermúdez	Colombia	2:08.40	
7	Stephen Fahy	Bermuda	2:08.40	
