= Swimming at the 1995 Pan American Games – Men's 200 metre individual medley =

Men's 200 metre individual medley at the 1995 Pan American Games
- Venue: Complejo Natatorio
- Dates: between March 12–17 (preliminaries and finals)
- Competitors: from - nations

Medalists
Gold medal	Curtis Myden	Canada
Silver medal	Greg Burgess	United States
Bronze medal	Eric Namesnik	United States

The men's 200 metre individual medley competition of the swimming events at the 1995 Pan American Games took place between March 12–17 at the Complejo Natatorio. The last Pan American Games champion was Ron Karnaugh of US.

This race consisted of four lengths of the pool, one each in backstroke, breaststroke, butterfly and freestyle swimming.

== Results ==
All times are in minutes and seconds.

KEY:	q	Fastest non-qualifiers	Q	Qualified	GR	Games record	NR	National record	PB	Personal best	SB	Seasonal best

=== Final ===
The final was held between March 12–17.

Rank	Name	Nationality	Time	Notes
1st place, gold medalist(s)	Curtis Myden	Canada	2:01.70	
2nd place, silver medalist(s)	Greg Burgess	United States	2:03.62	
3rd place, bronze medalist(s)	Eric Namesnik	United States	2:03.70	
4	Gary Anderson	Canada	2:09.57	
5	Roberto Dobie	Argentina	2:12.70	
6	Francisco Zavala	Ecuador	2:12.90	
7	Rafael Castellanos	El Salvador	2:15.15	
8	-	-	-	
