= Swimming at the 1999 Pan American Games – Men's 400 metre individual medley =

Men's 400 metre individual medley at the 1999 Pan American Games
- Venue: Pan Am Pool
- Dates: August 3 (preliminaries and finals)
- Competitors: from - nations

Medalists
Gold medal	Curtis Myden	Canada
Silver medal	Eric Donnelly	United States
Bronze medal	Owen von Richter	Canada

The men's 400 metre individual medley competition of the swimming events at the 1999 Pan American Games took place on 3 August at the Pan Am Pool. The last Pan American Games champion was Curtis Myden of Canada.

This race consisted of eight lengths of the pool. The first two lengths were swum using the butterfly stroke, the second pair with the backstroke, the third pair of lengths in breaststroke, and the final two were freestyle.

== Results ==
All times are in minutes and seconds.

KEY:	q	Fastest non-qualifiers	Q	Qualified	GR	Games record	NR	National record	PB	Personal best	SB	Seasonal best

=== Heats ===
The first round was held on August 3.

Rank	Name	Nationality	Time	Notes
1	Eric Donnelly	United States	4:19.72	Q
2	Joe Montague	United States	4:21.65	Q
3	-	-	-	Q
4	-	-	-	Q
5	-	-	-	Q
6	-	-	-	Q
7	-	-	-	Q
8	-	-	-	Q

=== B Final ===
The B final was held on August 3.

Rank	Name	Nationality	Time	Notes
9	George Bovell	Trinidad and Tobago	4:33.16	
10	Sebastian Thoret	Ecuador	4:36.20	
11	M.O.Burgos	Chile	4:36.69	
12	Pablo Banfi	Chile	4:45.24	
13	E.Aguilar	El Salvador	4:45.53	
14	Sergio Cabrera	Paraguay	4:45.92	
15	Gianmarco Mosto	Peru	4:53.87	

=== A Final ===
The A final was held on August 3.

Rank	Name	Nationality	Time	Notes
1st place, gold medalist(s)	Curtis Myden	Canada	4:15.52	GR
2nd place, silver medalist(s)	Eric Donnelly	United States	4:17.86	
3rd place, bronze medalist(s)	Owen von Richter	Canada	4:19.62	
4	Joe Montague	United States	4:21.83	
5	Alejandro Bermúdez	Colombia	4:27.11	
6	Gunter Rodríguez	Cuba	4:28.86	
7	Juan Veloz	Mexico	4:30.48	
8	Jeremy Knowles	Bahamas	4:35.47	
