= Swimming at the 1995 Pan American Games – Men's 200 metre backstroke =

Men's 200 metre backstroke at the 1995 Pan American Games
- Venue: Complejo Natatorio
- Dates: between March 12–17 (preliminaries and finals)
- Competitors: from - nations

Medalists
Gold medal	Brad Bridgewater	United States
Silver medal	Rodolfo Falcón	Cuba
Bronze medal	Rogério Romero	Brazil

The men's 200 metre backstroke competition of the swimming events at the 1995 Pan American Games took place between March 12–17 at the Complejo Natatorio. The last Pan American Games champion was Rogério Romero of Brazil.

This race consisted of four lengths of the pool, all in backstroke.

== Results ==
All times are in minutes and seconds.

KEY:	q	Fastest non-qualifiers	Q	Qualified	GR	Games record	NR	National record	PB	Personal best	SB	Seasonal best

=== Final ===
The final was held between March 12–17.

Rank	Name	Nationality	Time	Notes
1st place, gold medalist(s)	Brad Bridgewater	United States	2:00.79	
2nd place, silver medalist(s)	Rodolfo Falcón	Cuba	2:00.98	
3rd place, bronze medalist(s)	Rogério Romero	Brazil	2:01.13	
4	Christopher Renaud	Canada	2:01.52	
5	Neisser Vázquez	Cuba	2:02.11	
6	Greg Burgess	United States	2:02.13	
7	Curtis Myden	Canada	2:03.18	
8	Manuel Flores	Puerto Rico	2:04.42	
