= Swimming at the 1995 Pan American Games – Men's 100 metre backstroke =

Men's 100 metre backstroke at the 1995 Pan American Games
- Venue: Complejo Natatorio
- Dates: between March 12–17 (preliminaries and finals)
- Competitors: from - nations

Medalists
Gold medal	Jeff Rouse	United States
Silver medal	Tripp Schwenk	United States
Bronze medal	Rodolfo Falcón	Cuba

The men's 100 metre backstroke competition of swimming events at the 1995 Pan American Games took place between March 12–17 at the Complejo Natatorio. The last Pan American Games champion was Andrew Gill of the United States.

This race consisted of two lengths of the pool, all in backstroke.

== Results ==
All times are in minutes and seconds.

KEY:	q	Fastest non-qualifiers	Q	Qualified	GR	Games record	NR	National record	PB	Personal best	SB	Seasonal best

=== Final ===
The final was held between March 12–17.

Rank	Name	Nationality	Time	Notes
1st place, gold medalist(s)	Jeff Rouse	United States	54.74	GR
2nd place, silver medalist(s)	Tripp Schwenk	United States	55.60	
3rd place, bronze medalist(s)	Rodolfo Falcón	Cuba	56.13	
4	Rogério Romero	Brazil	56.54	
5	Christopher Renaud	Canada	56.61	
6	Neisser Vázquez	Cuba	56.82	
7	Manuel Flores	Puerto Rico	57.34	
8	Carlos Martínez	Mexico	57.65	
