= Swimming at the 1991 Pan American Games – Men's 400 metre individual medley =

Men's 400 metre individual medley at the 1991 Pan American Games
- Venue: -
- Dates: August 13 (preliminaries and finals)
- Competitors: from - nations

Medalists
Gold medal	Alex Kostich	United States
Silver medal	Jody Braden	United States
Bronze medal	Jasen Pratt	Canada

The men's 400 metre individual medley competition of the swimming events at the 1991 Pan American Games took place on 13 August. The last Pan American Games champion was Jerry Frentsos of the United States.

This race consisted of eight lengths of the pool. The first two lengths were swum using the butterfly stroke, the second pair with the backstroke, the third pair of lengths in breaststroke, and the final two were freestyle.

== Results ==
All times are in minutes and seconds.

KEY:	q	Fastest non-qualifiers	Q	Qualified	GR	Games record	NR	National record	PB	Personal best	SB	Seasonal best

=== Final ===
The final was held on August 13.

Rank	Name	Nationality	Time	Notes
1st place, gold medalist(s)	Alex Kostich	United States	4:23.96	
2nd place, silver medalist(s)	Jody Braden	United States	4:26.25	
3rd place, bronze medalist(s)	Jasen Pratt	Canada	4:26.31	
4	David Monasterio	Puerto Rico	4:27.30	
5	Andres Minelli	Argentina	4:29.94	
6	Renato Ramalho	Brazil	4:31.88	
7	Gonzalo Pérez	Venezuela	4:32.05	
8	Rene Santaella	Puerto Rico	4:37.84	
