= Swimming at the 1995 Pan American Games – Men's 400 metre individual medley =

Men's 400 metre individual medley at the 1995 Pan American Games
- Venue: Complejo Natatorio
- Dates: between March 12–17 (preliminaries and finals)
- Competitors: from - nations

Medalists
Gold medal	Curtis Myden	Canada
Silver medal	Eric Namesnik	United States
Bronze medal	Iain Mull	United States

The men's 400 metre individual medley competition of the swimming events at the 1995 Pan American Games took place between March 12–17 at the Complejo Natatorio. The last Pan American Games champion was Alex Kostich of US.

This race consisted of eight lengths of the pool. The first two lengths were swum using the butterfly stroke, the second pair with the backstroke, the third pair of lengths in breaststroke, and the final two were freestyle.

== Results ==
All times are in minutes and seconds.

KEY:	q	Fastest non-qualifiers	Q	Qualified	GR	Games record	NR	National record	PB	Personal best	SB	Seasonal best

=== Final ===
The final was held between March 12–17.

Rank	Name	Nationality	Time	Notes
1st place, gold medalist(s)	Curtis Myden	Canada	4:18.55	
2nd place, silver medalist(s)	Eric Namesnik	United States	4:19.00	
3rd place, bronze medalist(s)	Iain Mull	United States	4:26.32	
4	Alejandro Bermúdez	Colombia	4:27.36	
5	Jasen Pratt	Canada	4:29.63	
6	Francisco Suares	Ecuador	4:41.74	
7	Roberto Dobie	Argentina	4:42.31	
8	Rafael Castellanos	El Salvador	4:47.55	
