= Dan Shevchik =

American swimmer (born 1980)

Personal information
- Full name: Dan Shevchik
- Nationality: United States
- Born: November 24, 1980 (age 45) United States

Sport
- Sport: Swimming
- Strokes: Backstroke
Medal record
Men's swimming
Representing United States
Pan American Games
Bronze medal – third place	1999 Winnipeg	200 m Backstroke

Dan Shevchik (born November 24, 1980) is a former American competitive swimmer, who won a bronze medal in the 200-meter backstroke at the 1999 Pan American Games. In 2018, Shevchik was named to the Harvard Varsity Club of Hall of Fame following a decorated career in which he won the Phil Moriarty Award (Ivy League Championship Swimmer of the Meet) four times and earned four consecutive appearances on the All-American first team in the 200M backstroke and 400M IM. His career also featured three Ivy League Championships (2000, 2001, 2003).

Shevchik is currently a sports media executive at Sports Media Advisors in New Canaan, Connecticut. Since joining SMA at the firm's inception in 2009, Shevchik has worked with virtually all of the firm's clients, including initiatives with the NFL, MLB, NASCAR, USTA, UFC, Hockey Canada, Little League, EA, Twitter, NextVR, and several private equity firms. Over the course of his career, he has negotiated more than $10B worth of media rights deals. Shevchik's work at SMA led to him being named to the Sports Business Journal's Forty Under 40 in 2018.

Prior to joining SMA, Shevchik completed a Masters in Business Administration degree at Stanford Graduate School of Business. He began his professional career in the Mergers & Acquisitions group at Compass Advisers in London, advising corporations and private equity firms on transactions with a focus in media. Shevchik received an A.B. in Applied Mathematics Economics from Harvard College, cum laude.
