= Swimming at the 1991 Pan American Games – Men's 200 metre individual medley =

Men's 200 metre individual medley at the 1991 Pan American Games
- Venue: -
- Dates: August 18 (preliminaries and finals)
- Competitors: from - nations

Medalists
Gold medal	Ron Karnaugh	United States
Silver medal	Manuel Guzmán	Puerto Rico
Bronze medal	Ray Looze	United States

The men's 200 metre individual medley competition of the swimming events at the 1991 Pan American Games took place on 18 August. The last Pan American Games champion was Bill Stapleton of US.

This race consisted of four lengths of the pool, one each in backstroke, breaststroke, butterfly and freestyle swimming.

== Results ==
All times are in minutes and seconds.

KEY:	q	Fastest non-qualifiers	Q	Qualified	GR	Games record	NR	National record	PB	Personal best	SB	Seasonal best

=== Final ===
The final was held on August 18.

Rank	Name	Nationality	Time	Notes
1st place, gold medalist(s)	Ron Karnaugh	United States	2:00.92	GR
2nd place, silver medalist(s)	Manuel Guzmán	Puerto Rico	2:03.99	
3rd place, bronze medalist(s)	Ray Looze	United States	2:04.29	
4	Yves Guillemette	Canada	2:06.60	
5	Rodrigo González	Mexico	2:07.02	
6	Robert Fox	Canada	2:07.10	
7	José Carlos Souza	Brazil	2:07.82	
8	Renato Ramalho	Brazil	2:09.09	
