= Hella Rentema =

Dutch swimmer

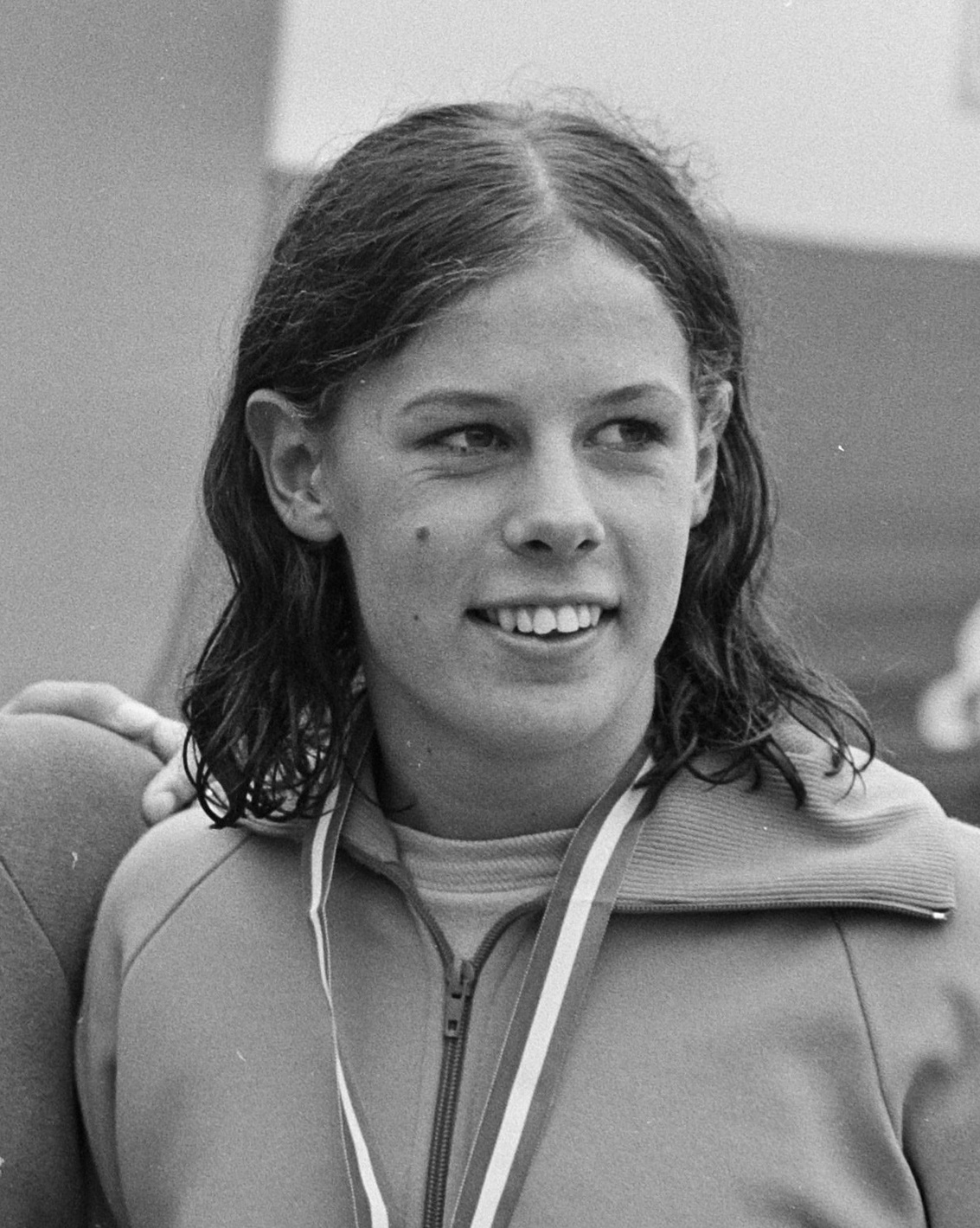
- Hella Rentema in 1968

Personal information
- Born: 12 April 1950 (age 76) Groningen, Netherlands
- Height: 1.67 m (5 ft 6 in)
- Weight: 54 kg (119 lb)

Sport
- Sport: Swimming
- Club: DZ, Groningen

Hella Elise Rentema (born 12 April 1950) is a retired Dutch swimmer. She competed at the 1968 Summer Olympics in the 4×100 mm freestyle relay, but her team failed to reach the final.

She married Kees Versfeld and changed her last name to Versfeld. She has a daughter, Kim, and two sons, Niels and Mark, all born in Canada; Mark Versfeld (b. 1976) is a retired Canadian Olympic swimmer. She still competes in masters swimming and triathlon, as well as her husband.
