= Swimming at the 1987 Pan American Games – Men's 400 metre individual medley =

Men's 400 metre individual medley at the 1987 Pan American Games
- Venue: Indiana University Natatorium
- Dates: August 10 (preliminaries and finals)
- Competitors: from - nations

Medalists
Gold medal	Jerry Frentsos	United States
Silver medal	Jeff Prior	United States
Bronze medal	Mike Meldrum	Canada

The men's 400 metre individual medley competition of the swimming events at the 1987 Pan American Games took place on 10 August at the Indiana University Natatorium. The last Pan American Games champion was Ricardo Prado of Brazil.

This race consisted of eight lengths of the pool. The first two lengths were swum using the butterfly stroke, the second pair with the backstroke, the third pair of lengths in breaststroke, and the final two were freestyle.

== Results ==
All times are in minutes and seconds.

KEY:	q	Fastest non-qualifiers	Q	Qualified	GR	Games record	NR	National record	PB	Personal best	SB	Seasonal best

=== Final ===
The final was held on August 10.

Rank	Name	Nationality	Time	Notes
1st place, gold medalist(s)	Jerry Frentsos	United States	4:23.92	
2nd place, silver medalist(s)	Jeff Prior	United States	4:26.31	
3rd place, bronze medalist(s)	Mike Meldrum	Canada	4:29.63	
4	Renato Ramalho	Brazil	4:32.47	
5	Ray Brown	Canada	4:33.47	
6	Javier Careaga	Mexico	4:34.13	
7	Ricardo Jimenez	Venezuela	4:34.19	
8	Rhett Ping	Trinidad and Tobago	4:42.88	
