= Rodolfo Falcón =

Cuban swimmer (born 1972)

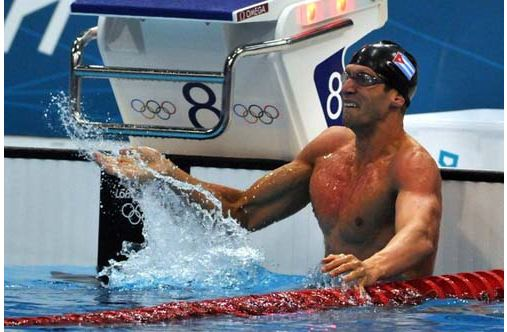
- Falcòn at the 2000 Summer Olympics

Personal information
- Full name: Rodolfo A. Falcón Cabrera
- Born: 25 October 1972 (age 53) Havana, Cuba
- Height: 1.86 m (6 ft 1 in)

Sport
- Country: Cuba
- Sport: Swimming
- Strokes: Backstroke
- Club: Escuela Marcelo Salado
- College team: Marcelo Salado
- Coach: José Vázquez Gómez
Medal record
Men's swimming
Representing Cuba
Olympic Games
Silver medal – second place	1996 Atlanta	100 backstroke
World Championships (SC)
Gold medal – first place	1995 Rio	100 backstroke
Gold medal – first place	1995 Rio	200 backstroke
Gold medal – first place	1999 Hong Kong	50 backstroke
Gold medal – first place	1999 Hong Kong	100 backstroke
Silver medal – second place	2000 Athens	100 backstroke
Bronze medal – third place	1993 Palma	100 backstroke
Bronze medal – third place	2000 Athens	50 backstroke
Pan American Games
Gold medal – first place	1999 Winnipeg	100 backstroke
Silver medal – second place	1991 Havana	100 backstroke
Silver medal – second place	1995 Mar del Plata	200 backstroke
Bronze medal – third place	1995 Mar del Plata	100 backstroke
Universiade
Gold medal – first place	1993 Buffalo	100 backstroke
Gold medal – first place	1993 Buffalo	200 backstroke
Men's open water swimming
Central American and Caribbean Games
Bronze medal – third place	2023 San Salvador	5 km

Rodolfo A. Falcón Cabrera (Note: In this Spanish name, the first or paternal surname is Falcón and the second or maternal family name is Cabrera.) (born 25 October 1972, in Havana, Cuba) is a 3-time Olympic swimmer from Cuba, and has been called the country's best swimmer ever. Since 2006, he has been the country's National Commissioner for swimming.

He swam for Cuba at the 1992, 1996, and 2000 Olympics. At the 1996 Games, he won the silver medal in the 100 back ahead of countryman Neisser Bent—these represent the one swimming Olympic medals won by a Cuban. Falcón retired from the sport in 2002.

At the 1998 Central American and Caribbean Games, he set the Championship Record in 100 backstroke at 56.00, which still stands as the record as of 2009.

In Paris at the 2024 Olympics, his son, Rodolfo Falcón Jr., competed in the 1500 meter freestyle, finishing last among the 24 swimmers who contested the event.
