= Jasen Pratt =

Canadian swimmer

Sport
- Country: Canada
- Sport: Swimming
- Event: Medley
Medal record
Pan American Games
Bronze medal – third place	1991 Havana	400 m medley

Jasen Pratt is a Canadian former swimmer active in the late 1980s and early 1990s.

A native of Alberta, Pratt was a national champion in the 200 m and 400 m individual medley. His best results came in the 400 m individual medley, an event in which he won a bronze medal at the 1991 Pan American Games and was less than a second away from qualifying for the 1992 Barcelona Olympics. He came seventh in the 400 m individual medley at the Pan American Games in Mar del Plata and retired soon after to move into coaching.

Pratt is the eldest brother of ice hockey players Harlan Pratt and Nolan Pratt. Both his daughter Halle Pratt and son Cole Pratt competed at the Tokyo Olympics, as a synchronised swimmer and backstroke swimmer respectively.
