= Raymond Hunt =

New Zealand cricketer

Ray Hunt
Personal information
- Full name: Raymond Thomas Hunt
- Born: 17 September 1921; Dunedin, Otago, New Zealand
- Died: 15 August 1994 (aged 72); Birmingham, England
- Batting: Right-handed

Domestic team information
- Years: Team
- 1947/48–1953/54: Otago
- 1959/60: Canterbury
- Source: ESPNcricinfo, 14 May 2016

Raymond Thomas Hunt (17 September 1921 – 15 August 1994) was a New Zealand cricketer and later an innovative and notable cricket coach. He played first-class cricket for Otago and Canterbury between 1947 and 1960.
