= Swimming at the 1991 Pan American Games – Men's 100 metre backstroke =

Men's 100 metre backstroke at the 1991 Pan American Games
- Venue: -
- Dates: August 17 (preliminaries and finals)
- Competitors: from - nations

Medalists
Gold medal	Andrew Gill	United States
Silver medal	Rodolfo Falcón	Cuba
Bronze medal	Robert Brewer	United States

The men's 100 metre backstroke competition of the swimming events at the 1991 Pan American Games took place on 17 August. The last Pan American Games champion was Andrew Gill of US.

This race consisted of two lengths of the pool, all in backstroke.

== Results ==
All times are in minutes and seconds.

KEY:	q	Fastest non-qualifiers	Q	Qualified	GR	Games record	NR	National record	PB	Personal best	SB	Seasonal best

=== Final ===
The final was held on August 17.

Rank	Name	Nationality	Time	Notes
1st place, gold medalist(s)	Andrew Gill	United States	55.79	
2nd place, silver medalist(s)	Rodolfo Falcón	Cuba	56.12	
3rd place, bronze medalist(s)	Robert Brewer	United States	56.39	
4	Manuel Guzmán	Puerto Rico	56.67	
5	Rogério Romero	Brazil	57.46	
6	Sebastian Lasave	Argentina	58.72	
7	Paul Szekula	Canada	58.87	
8	Ricardo Busquets	Puerto Rico	59.09	
