= Cameron Delaney (swimmer) =

Australian swimmer (born 1980)

Personal information
- Full name: Cameron Delaney
- National team: Australia
- Born: 25 November 1980 (age 45) Sydney, New South Wales
- Height: 1.80 m (5 ft 11 in)
- Weight: 71 kg (157 lb)

Sport
- Sport: Swimming
- Strokes: Backstroke
- Club: Galston Swim Club
Medal record
Men's swimming
Representing Australia
Pan Pacific Championships
Bronze medal – third place	1999 Sydney	200m backstroke

Cameron Delaney (born 25 November 1980) is an Australian former swimmer who competed at the 2000 Summer Olympics in Sydney. There he finished in eleventh position in the 200m backstroke, clocking 2:00.39 in the semifinal.

Delaney, who started swimming as a child on the advice of his doctor due to a weak chest, was a member of the Galston Swimming Club in Sydney and trained under former Olympian Gary Winram. He also worked as a lifeguard whilst training.

In 1999, Delaney made himself noticed as a backstroke contender by finishing third in the 200m backstroke in the Pan Pacific Swimming Championships. In this race, he finished third behind American Lenny Krayzelburg, who beat the world record. Delaney took nearly 2.5 seconds off his previous personal best in this race and in process breaking the 2-minute mark with a time 1:59.98 minutes.

At the 2004 Australian Swimming Championships (which doubled as the 2004 Olympics qualifiers), Delaney just failed to qualify finishing second to Matt Welsh in a time of 2:00.68 minutes.
