= Adrian Radley =

Australian swimmer

Personal information
- Born: 22 April 1976 (age 50)
Medal record
Men's swimming
Representing Australia
World Championships (SC)
Gold medal – first place	1997 Gothenburg	4×100 m medley
Silver medal – second place	1995 Rio de Janeiro	4×100 m medley
Bronze medal – third place	1997 Gothenburg	100 m backstroke
Pan Pacific Championships
Silver medal – second place	1997 Fukuoka	4×100 m medley
Commonwealth Games
Gold medal – first place	1998 Kuala Lumpur	4 x 100 m medley relay - heat
Silver medal – second place	1998 Kuala Lumpur	200 m backstroke

Adrian Radley (born 22 April 1976) is a retired Australian swimmer specialising in backstroke events. He is best known for winning a gold medal in the men's 100 m backstroke, and bronze in the men's 4 × 100 m medley relay, at the 1997 FINA Short Course World Championships in Gothenburg, Sweden. Radley also competed at the 1998 Commonwealth Games in Kuala Lumpur, where he won a gold medal as a part of the men's 4 × 100 m medley relay and an individual silver medal in the men's 200 m backstroke

Radley completed a double bachelor's degree in commerce with majors in Strategy, Marketing and Accounting. Adrian is a Partner at professional services firm KPMG and lives with his partner and two daughters in Perth, Western Australia.

== See also ==
- List of Commonwealth Games medalists in swimming (men)
