= Lenny Krayzelburg =

American swimmer

Personal information
- Native name: Ленні Крайзельбург
- National team: United States
- Born: Leonid Olehovych Krayzelburg; September 28, 1975 (age 50) Odesa, Ukrainian SSR, Soviet Union (now Ukraine)
- Height: 6 ft 2 in (1.88 m)
- Weight: 192 lb (87 kg)

Sport
- Sport: Swimming
- Strokes: Backstroke
- Club: Irvine Novaquatics
- College team: University of Southern California
- Coach: Mark Schubert
Medal record
Men's swimming
Representing the United States
Event	1st	2nd	3rd
Olympic Games	4	0	0
World Championships (LC)	2	1	0
World Championships (SC)	1	1	0
Pan Pacific Championships	6	0	0
Maccabiah Games	2	0	0
Goodwill Games	1	2	0
Total	16	4	0
Olympic Games
Gold medal – first place	2000 Sydney	100 m backstroke
Gold medal – first place	2000 Sydney	200 m backstroke
Gold medal – first place	2000 Sydney	4×100 m medley
Gold medal – first place	2004 Athens	4×100 m medley
World Championships (LC)
Gold medal – first place	1998 Perth	100 m backstroke
Gold medal – first place	1998 Perth	200 m backstroke
Silver medal – second place	1998 Perth	4×100 m medley
World Championships (SC)
Gold medal – first place	2000 Athens	4×100 m medley
Silver medal – second place	2000 Athens	50 m backstroke
Pan Pacific Championships
Gold medal – first place	1997 Fukuoka	100 m backstroke
Gold medal – first place	1997 Fukuoka	200 m backstroke
Gold medal – first place	1997 Fukuoka	4×100 m medley
Gold medal – first place	1999 Sydney	100 m backstroke
Gold medal – first place	1999 Sydney	200 m backstroke
Gold medal – first place	1999 Sydney	4×100 m medley
Maccabiah Games
Gold medal – first place	2001 Israel	100 m backstroke
Gold medal – first place	2001 Israel	4×100 m medley
Goodwill Games
Gold medal – first place	1998 New York	200 m backstroke
Silver medal – second place	1998 New York	100 m backstroke
Silver medal – second place	1998 New York	4×100 m medley

Lenny Krayzelburg (Note: Ukrainian: Ленні Крайзельбург, romanized: Lenni Kraizelburh; Russian: Ленни Крайзельбург, romanized: Lenni Krayzelburg) (born Leonid Olehovych Krayzelburg, (Note: Ukrainian: Леонід Олегович Крайзельбург, romanized: Leonid Olehovych Kraizelburh; Russian: Леонид Олегович Крайзельбург, romanized: Leonid Olegovich Krayzelburg) September 28, 1975) is an American former backstroke swimmer, Olympic gold medalist, and former world record holder. He swam in the 2000 and 2004 Olympics, winning a total of four Olympic gold medals.

== Early years ==
Krayzelburg is Jewish, and was born to Jewish parents in Odesa, Ukrainian SSR (now Ukraine). Krayzelburg and his family left the Soviet Union in 1989 for the United States. They settled in Los Angeles.

After their immigration, Krayzelburg's family suffered from financial difficulties. He had to commute by bus and on foot 45 minutes each way to swimming practice, and did not get home before 9:30 in the evening. In addition, Lenny had to cope with language problems, and learn English rapidly in order to understand his coaches' instructions. Thankfully he was aided by the extensive Russian community in Los Angeles, and managed to adapt quickly.

== College ==
Lenny first attended Fairfax High School, and then attended Santa Monica College where he won both the 100 and 200-yard (180 m) backstroke junior college titles. His coach at Santa Monica recognized his talent and recommended him to Mark Schubert at the University of Southern California. In 1995, he became a naturalized citizen of the United States. Three years later, he became the first swimmer since 1986 to sweep the backstroke events, 100 m & 200 m, in the World Championships.

In 1999, Krayzelburg broke the 50, 100 and the 200 m world records respectively, setting the clock on 24.99, 53.60 and 1:55.87. He was then recognized as the top backstroke swimmer in the world and one of the best in the history of this swimming style.

He continued to dominate at the 2000 Summer Olympics backstroke, shattering the Olympic record and nearing his own 1999 world record with 53.72 in the 100, while making another Olympic record in the 200 with a 1:56.76. He also played an important role in helping the American team win a gold medal in the 4 × 100 m relay with a new world record of 3:33.73.

== Maccabiah Games ==
After the Olympics Krayzelburg decided to skip the 2001 World Championships that took place in Fukuoka, Japan, in order to focus on the 2001 Maccabiah Games in Israel. Being Jewish, Krayzelburg wanted to take advantage of this once-in-a-lifetime opportunity to compete with other top Jewish athletes. In addition, he wanted to fulfill a childhood dream by visiting the holy land, and lifting the American delegate flag during the games' opening ceremony. He was selected to carry the flag for the United States at the opening ceremonies. He earned gold and set a new Maccabiah record in the 100-meter backstroke, and won a second gold medal in the 4×100-meter medley relay.

At the 2017 Maccabiah Games, in the special 4×50m relay race between Israeli and American all-star teams, American Olympic champions Krayzelburg, Jason Lezak (four Olympic golds), and Anthony Ervin (three Olympic golds), with masters swimmer Alex Blavatnik, swam a time of 1:48.23 and defeated Israeli Olympians Guy Barnea, Yoav Bruck, Eran Groumi, and Tal Stricker, who had a time of 1:51.25.

== Difficulties, perseverance ==
After the Maccabiah games, he underwent surgery on his left shoulder, following a fall while running on a treadmill, which required him to take a year off of training.

In September 2003, Krazelburg split from his coach Mark Schubert, to start training under Dave Salo, who also coached Aaron Peirsol. Peirsol was considered by many to be Krayzelburg's successor. Working with Salo, Krayzelburg changed the style of his stroke to account for his shoulder injuries.

== International Swimming League involvement ==
Following his retirement from elite competition, Krayzelburg entered team management in the professional swimming arena. In 2020 he served as General Manager of the LA Current, a franchise of the International Swimming League.

In March 2021 the ISL announced that Krayzelburg would be among returning General Managers for its Season 3 line-up.

Krayzelburg has spoken publicly on the ISL’s model of team-based competition and athlete development, emphasising the benefits of a professional league format for swimmers beyond traditional international meets.

== See also ==
- List of multiple Olympic gold medalists
- List of multiple Olympic gold medalists at a single Games
- List of Olympic medalists in swimming (men)
- List of select Jewish swimmers
- List of University of Southern California people
- List of World Aquatics Championships medalists in swimming (men)
- World record progression 50 metres backstroke
- World record progression 100 metres backstroke
- World record progression 200 metres backstroke
- World record progression 4 × 100 metres medley relay

== Notes ==
Records
Preceded by Jeff Rouse	Men's 100-meter backstroke world record-holder (long course); August 24, 1999 – August 21, 2004	Succeeded by Aaron Peirsol
Preceded by Martin López-Zubero	Men's 200-meter backstroke world record-holder (long course); August 27, 1999 – March 20, 2002	Succeeded by Aaron Peirsol
Preceded by Jeff Rouse	Men's 50-meter backstroke world record-holder (long course); August 28, 1999 – July 27, 2003	Succeeded by Thomas Rupprath
Awards
Preceded by Jeff Rouse, Jeremy Linn, Mark Henderson & Gary Hall, Jr.	Swimming World; American Swimmer of the Year; 1997–2000	Succeeded by Michael Phelps
