= Tseng Cheng-hua =

Taiwanese swimmer

Personal information
- Full name: Tseng Cheng-hua
- National team: Chinese Taipei
- Born: 25 September 1980 (age 45) Taipei, Taiwan
- Height: 1.66 m (5 ft 5 in)
- Weight: 57 kg (126 lb)

Sport
- Sport: Swimming
- Strokes: Butterfly

Tseng Cheng-hua (Chinese: 曾 正華; pinyin: Céng Zhènghuá; born September 25, 1980) is a Taiwanese former swimmer, who specialized in butterfly events. He is a single-time Olympian (2000), and a top 8 finalist in both 100 and 200 m butterfly at the 2002 Asian Games in Busan, South Korea.

Tseng competed only in two individual events at the 2000 Summer Olympics in Sydney. He achieved FINA B-standards of 56.13 (100 m butterfly) and 2:04.83 (200 m butterfly) from the National University Games in Taipei. In his first event, 200 m butterfly, Tseng placed thirty-fifth on the morning prelims. He established a Taiwanese record of 2:03.62 to lead against five other swimmers in heat one. Three days later, in the 100 m butterfly, Tseng challenged seven other swimmers in heat three, including Kyrgyzstan's Konstantin Ushkov, silver medalist for Russia in Atlanta four years earlier, and Uzbekistan's top favorite Ravil Nachaev. He posted a time of 56.39 to earn a third seed and fifty-second overall, finishing behind winner Nachaev by more than a second.
