= Josh Watson (swimmer) =

Australian backstroke swimmer (born 1977)

Personal information
- Full name: Joshua John Watson
- Nickname: "Josh"
- National team: Australia
- Born: 31 July 1977 (age 49) Newcastle, New South Wales
- Height: 1.84 m (6 ft 0 in)
- Weight: 80 kg (176 lb)

Sport
- Sport: Swimming
- Strokes: Backstroke
- Club: Kingscliff Swim Club
Medal record
Men's swimming
Representing Australia
Olympic Games
Silver medal – second place	2000 Sydney	4×100 m medley
World Championships (SC)
Gold medal – first place	1999 Hong Kong	200 m backstroke
Pan Pacific Championships
Bronze medal – third place	1999 Sydney	100 m backstroke
Commonwealth Games
Gold medal – first place	1998 Kuala Lumpur	4 x 100 m medley relay
Silver medal – second place	1998 Kuala Lumpur	100 m backstroke

Joshua John Watson (born 31 July 1977) is an Australian backstroke swimmer who won a silver medal in the 4×100-metre medley relay at the 2000 Summer Olympics in Sydney.

Training at the Kingscliff club near the Queensland border, and coached by Greg Salter, Watson became Australian champion in the 50-metre backstroke in 1996. However, as it was not an Olympic event, he did not gain national selection until 1997, when he competed at the 1997 FINA Short Course World Championships in Gothenburg, Sweden. In 1998, he made his international long-course debut at the 1998 Commonwealth Games, where he won a silver medal in the 100-metre backstroke and a gold medal in the medley relay. Josh was Australia's first male Backstroke World Champion when he won the 200m Backstroke at the 1999 FINA Short Course World Championships in Hong Kong. He also won bronze in the 100-metre backstroke at the 1999 Pan Pacific Swimming Championships in Sydney.

At the 2000 Summer Olympics in Sydney, Watson swam the backstroke leg in the heats of the 4×100-metre medley relay, before being replaced by Matt Welsh in the team that trailed the United States team home in the final. Watson was also a finalist in the 100-metre backstroke, where he was narrowly beaten into fourth place. Watson continued to be selected in the same role (except for a self-imposed break in 2002) until the 2004 Summer Olympics in Athens, when he failed to qualify for the semifinals of the 100-metrebackstroke. This enabled him to collect a gold medal in the 4×100-metre medley relay at the 2001 World Aquatics Championships in Fukuoka, Japan.

Watson now lives in Atlanta, Georgia with his wife Tess. He is the cousin of Melinda Gainsford-Taylor.

== See also ==
- List of Commonwealth Games medallists in swimming (men)
- List of Olympic medalists in swimming (men)
