= Curtis Myden =

Canadian swimmer (born 1973)

Personal information
- Full name: Curtis Allen Myden
- National team: Canada
- Born: December 31, 1973 (age 52) Calgary, Alberta, Canada
- Height: 1.88 m (6 ft 2 in)
- Weight: 84 kg (185 lb)

Sport
- Sport: Swimming
- Strokes: Medley, breaststroke
- College team: University of Calgary
Medal record
Men's swimming
Representing Canada
Olympic Games
Bronze medal – third place	1996 Atlanta	200 m medley
Bronze medal – third place	1996 Atlanta	400 m medley
Bronze medal – third place	2000 Sydney	400 m medley
World Championships (LC)
Bronze medal – third place	1998 Perth	400 m medley
World Championships (SC)
Silver medal – second place	1995 Rio	200 m medley
Silver medal – second place	1995 Rio	400 m medley
Pan Pacific Championships
Silver medal – second place	1997 Fukuoka	200 m medley
Silver medal – second place	1997 Fukuoka	400 m medley
Silver medal – second place	1999 Sydney	200 m medley
Silver medal – second place	1999 Sydney	400 m medley
Bronze medal – third place	1995 Atlanta	200 m medley
Commonwealth Games
Silver medal – second place	1994 Victoria	200 m medley
Silver medal – second place	1994 Victoria	400 m medley
Pan American Games
Gold medal – first place	1995 Mar del Plata	200 m medley
Gold medal – first place	1995 Mar del Plata	400 m medley
Gold medal – first place	1999 Winnipeg	200 m medley
Gold medal – first place	1999 Winnipeg	400 m medley
Bronze medal – third place	1995 Mar del Plata	200 m breaststroke
Bronze medal – third place	1995 Mar del Plata	4×100 m medley

Curtis Allen Myden (born December 31, 1973) is a former breaststroke and medley swimmer from Canada, who competed at three consecutive Summer Olympics in 1992, 1996 and 2000. He won a total number of three medals at the Olympics, all of them bronze. Myden was one of Canada's leading swimmers in the 1990s. He was coached by Canadian coach Deryk Snelling.

He is an orthopaedic surgeon in the Yukon.

== See also ==
- List of Commonwealth Games medallists in swimming (men)
- List of Olympic medalists in swimming (men)
