= Jeff Rouse (swimmer) =

American swimmer (born 1970)

Personal information
- Full name: Jeffrey Norman Rouse
- Nickname: "Jeff"
- National team: United States
- Born: February 6, 1970 (age 56) Fredericksburg, Virginia, U.S.
- Height: 6 ft 4 in (1.93 m)
- Weight: 190 lb (86 kg)

Sport
- Sport: Swimming
- Strokes: Backstroke
- College team: Stanford University
Medal record
Men's swimming
Representing the United States
Olympic Games
Gold medal – first place	1992 Barcelona	4x100 m medley
Gold medal – first place	1996 Atlanta	100 m backstroke
Gold medal – first place	1996 Atlanta	4x100 m medley
Silver medal – second place	1992 Barcelona	100 m backstroke
World Championships (LC)
Gold medal – first place	1991 Perth	100 m backstroke
Gold medal – first place	1991 Perth	4x100 m medley
Gold medal – first place	1994 Rome	4x100 m medley
Silver medal – second place	1994 Rome	100 m backstroke
Pan Pacific Championships
Gold medal – first place	1989 Tokyo	100 m backstroke
Gold medal – first place	1989 Tokyo	4x100 m medley
Gold medal – first place	1991 Edmonton	100 m backstroke
Gold medal – first place	1991 Edmonton	200 m backstroke
Gold medal – first place	1991 Edmonton	4x100 m medley
Gold medal – first place	1993 Kobe	100 m backstroke
Gold medal – first place	1993 Kobe	4x100 m medley
Gold medal – first place	1995 Atlanta	100 m backstroke
Gold medal – first place	1995 Atlanta	4x100 m medley
Pan American Games
Gold medal – first place	1995 Mar del Plata	100 m backstroke
Gold medal – first place	1995 Mar del Plata	4x100 m medley

Jeffrey Norman Rouse (born February 6, 1970) is an American former competition swimmer, three-time Olympic champion, and former world record-holder in three events.

Rouse represented the United States in two consecutive Olympic Games in 1992 and 1996. At the 1992 Summer Olympics in Barcelona, Spain, he won a gold medal swimming for the winning U.S. team in the men's 4×100-meter medley relay. Individually, he also received a silver medal for his second-place performance in the men's 100-meter backstroke.

Four years later at the 1996 Summer Olympics in Atlanta, Georgia, he earned a gold medal as a member of the first-place U.S. team in the men's 4×100-meter medley relay. In individual competition, he won another gold medal in the men's 100-meter backstroke.

Rouse is a member of the Virginia Sports Hall of Fame and the International Swimming Hall of Fame.

== See also ==
- List of members of the International Swimming Hall of Fame
- List of multiple Olympic gold medalists
- List of Olympic medalists in swimming (men)
- List of Stanford University people
- List of World Aquatics Championships medalists in swimming (men)
- World record progression 50 metres backstroke
- World record progression 100 metres backstroke
- World record progression 4 × 100 metres medley relay

Records
Preceded by David Berkoff	Men's 100-meter backstroke world record-holder (long course); August 25, 1991 – August 24, 1999	Succeeded by Lenny Krayzelburg
Preceded by –	Men's 50-meter backstroke world record-holder (short course); February 12, 1995 – February 28, 1997	Succeeded by Chris Renaud
