= Renato Ramalho =

Brazilian swimmer (born 1968)

Personal information
- Full name: Renato Ramalho
- Born: April 17, 1968 (age 58) Curitiba, Paraná, Brazil
- Height: 1.85 m (6 ft 1 in)
- Weight: 86 kg (190 lb)

Sport
- Sport: Swimming
- Strokes: Medley
- Club: Curitibano / Flamengo / Pinheiros
- College team: Arizona State University
Medal record
Men's swimming
Representing Brazil

Renato Ramalho (born April 17, 1968, in Curitiba) is a former international medley swimmer from Brazil. He participated for his native country at the 1988 Summer Olympics and 1992 Summer Olympics.

He started swimming at the age of five, at Clube Israelita Paranaense. His father, former captain of the Brazil men's national volleyball team along with other swimming enthusiasts, formed a parents' association to promote the competitive team, in the 1970s, called Clube do Golfinho. Over time, the association grew and, faced with the lack of interest on the part of Clube Israelita to keep the team competitive, the parents bought a plot of land, built the swimming pool and founded the Clube do Golfinho, in 1977.

At the age of 11, due to the departure of coach Carlos Fernandez, he joined Clube Curitibano. At the age of 13, coach Glauco Putomati, arguing that Renato had no talent for swimming, suggested that he go play volleyball, as his father had done. His mother did not accept the denial and appealed to the coach of the women's team, Leonardo Del Vescovo, to train him. Even with resistance, this happened and, after a year, the groups were unified. At 16 he was Brazilian champion.

Ramalho participated at the 1987 Pan American Games in Indianapolis, finishing 4th in the 400-metre individual medley.

At the 1988 Summer Olympics in Seoul, he finished 24th in the 400-metre individual medley, and 29th in the 200-metre individual medley.

On December 1, 1990, he broke the short-course Brazilian record in the 400-metre individual medley, with a time of 4:19.20. In late 2001, the record was still his.

He was at the 1991 World Aquatics Championships in Perth, where he finished 15th in the 400-metre individual medley, and 34th in the 200-metre individual medley.

Ramalho participated at the 1991 Pan American Games in Havana, finishing 6th in the 400-metre individual medley, and 8th in the 200-metre individual medley.

At the 1992 Summer Olympics in Barcelona, Ramalho finished 21st in the 400-metre individual medley, and 35th in the 200-metre individual medley.

Ramalho was seven times Brazilian medley champion, in the 90s. After retiring from swimming, Renato graduated in Business in Arizona in 1995 and returned to Brazil to undertake in Curitiba. After that, became a partner of Gustavo Borges in a swimming academy. In March 2002 was inaugurated the 1st unit of the academy, which now has 5 units.
