= Jo Yoshimi =

Japanese swimmer (born 1970)

Personal information
- Born: 1970 (age 55–56)
Medal record
Men's swimming
Representing Japan
Summer Universiade
Silver medal – second place	1995 Fukuoka	200m Individual Medley

Jo Yoshimi (吉見 譲, Yoshimi Jo; born June 12, 1970) is a retired male medley swimmer from Japan, who represented his native country at the 1996 Summer Olympics in Atlanta, Georgia. He is best known for winning the silver medal in the Men's 200m Individual Medley at the 1995 Summer Universiade in Fukuoka, behind America's Tom Wilkens.
