= Ron Karnaugh =

American swimmer (born 1966)

Personal information
- Full name: Ronald Daniel Karnaugh
- National team: United States
- Born: July 19, 1966 (age 60) Irvington, New Jersey
- Height: 6 ft 5 in (1.96 m)
- Weight: 201 lb (91 kg)

Sport
- Sport: Swimming
- Strokes: Individual medley
- College team: University of California, Berkeley
Medal record
Men's swimming
Representing the United States
World Championships (LC)
Bronze medal – third place	1998 Perth	200 m medley
Pan Pacific Championships
Bronze medal – third place	1997 Fukuoka	200 m medley
Pan American Games
Gold medal – first place	1991 Havana	200 m medley

Ronald Daniel Karnaugh (born July 19, 1966) is an American former competition swimmer for the University of California Berkeley, who swam for the U.S. team at the 1992 Summer Olympics in Barcelona.

== 1992 Olympics ==
Karnaugh competed in the men's 200-meter individual medley, advanced to the event final, and finished sixth overall in a time of 2:02.18.

In international competitions, Karnaugh has been a frequent medalist. He won a bronze at the 1996 Pan-Pacifics in the 200 IM, two bronze medals in the short-course Worlds in 1996, a silver swimming the 200 IM at the 1998 Goodwill Games, and another bronze in the 200IM at the 1998 World Championships.

In 1993 he broke the American record in the 200IM.

Karnaugh began attending Medical School after the 1992 Barcelona Olympics and graduated from the New Jersey College of Medicine and Dentistry in 1997, later practicing medicine as an interventional physiatrist. He continues swimming, and winning meets in United States masters’ swimming competitions.

== See also ==
- List of University of California, Berkeley alumni
- List of World Aquatics Championships medalists in swimming (men)
