= Mark Versfeld =

Canadian swimmer (born 1976)

Personal information
- Full name: Mark Andreas Cornelis Versfeld
- National team: Canada
- Born: June 13, 1976 (age 50) Edmonton, Alberta
- Height: 1.86 m (6 ft 1 in)
- Weight: 75 kg (165 lb)

Sport
- Sport: Swimming
- Strokes: Backstroke
- Club: Pacific Dolphins
- College team: University of British Columbia
Medal record
Men's swimming
Representing Canada
World Championships (LC)
Silver medal – second place	1998 Perth	100 m backstroke
Bronze medal – third place	1998 Perth	200 m backstroke
World Championships (SC)
Silver medal – second place	1999 Hong Kong	200 m backstroke
Pan Pacific Championships
Silver medal – second place	1997 Fukuoka	200 m backstroke
Silver medal – second place	1999 Sydney	4×100 m medley
Bronze medal – third place	1995 Atlanta	100 m backstroke
Bronze medal – third place	1997 Fukuoka	100 m backstroke
Bronze medal – third place	1997 Fukuoka	4×100 m medley
Pan American Games
Bronze medal – third place	1999 Winnipeg	4×100 m medley

Mark Andreas Cornelis Versfeld (born June 13, 1976) is a Canadian former competitive swimmer and backstroke specialist. At the 2000 Summer Olympics, he finished in 26th position in the 100 m backstroke. He won the same event and the 200 m backstroke two years earlier, at the 1998 Commonwealth Games. At the 1998 Aquatic World Championships he won a silver in the 100-metre backstroke, and bronze in the 200-metre backstroke, breaking a Commonwealth record in the process. He was named Canadian Male Aquatic Athlete of the Year in 1998.

== Biography ==
Two years after his birth, his family moved to Fort McMurray where he started swimming in a club at age 8. In 1981 his family relocated to Edmonton, and three years later to Calgary. After the departure of his Calgary coach Deryk Snelling, Versfeld moved to Vancouver, where he trained under Tom Johnson with the University of British Columbia. After mixed studies in the sciences, psychology and political science, he majored in Economics at the University of British Columbia.

In 2002 he retired from active swimming and in 2004 moved to Perth, Western Australia, where he took up surfing and swim coaching. He was part of the winning team in the Rottnest Island 21-kilometre open-water relay swim in 2006, along with Australian Olympians Bill Kirby, Todd Pearson and Duncan Armstrong.

== Family ==
His mother, Hella Rentema, is a former Olympic swimmer from the Netherlands. He has a sister, Kim, and a brother Niels, who is also a competitive swimmer. His father Kees (Cornelis) won a Silver Medal in the 320+ age group relay at the FINA World Masters Swim Championships held in Montreal in 2014.

== See also ==
- List of Commonwealth Games medallists in swimming (men)
