= Chris Renaud (swimmer) =

Canadian swimmer

Personal information
- Full name: Christopher Renaud
- National team: Canada
- Born: 29 August 1976 (age 49) Fredericton, New Brunswick
- Height: 1.85 m (6 ft 1 in)
- Weight: 75 kg (165 lb)

Sport
- Sport: Swimming
- Strokes: Backstroke
- College team: University of Calgary
Medal record
Men's swimming
Representing Canada
Short Course Worlds
Silver medal – second place	1995 Rio de Janeiro	200 backstroke
Pan American Games
Bronze medal – third place	1995 Mar del Plata	4x100m medley

Christopher Renaud (born 29 August 1976) is a former backstroke swimmer from Canada, who competed in two consecutive Summer Olympics for his native country, starting in 1996. His highlights include setting a world record in the short course 50-metre backstroke in 1997, and won several Canadian titles. He is an alumnus of Bishop Carroll High School.

Renaud was the first Canadian to break the two-minute barrier in the 200-metre backstroke, clocking 1:59.81 at the national championships in 1996, held just after the 1996 Olympics. He temporarily retired in 1997 to re-examine his career options, however he returned to Canada in 1998 and competed at the 1998 Commonwealth Games. His father Raymond Renaud played hockey for the Montreal Junior Canadiens in 1967.

== See also ==
- List of Commonwealth Games medallists in swimming (men)
- World record progression 50 metres backstroke

Records
Preceded by Jeff Rouse	Men's 50-metre backstroke world record-holder (short course); 28 February 1997 – 11 December 1998	Succeeded by Thomas Rupprath
