= 1999 Pan Pacific Swimming Championships =

International swimming competition

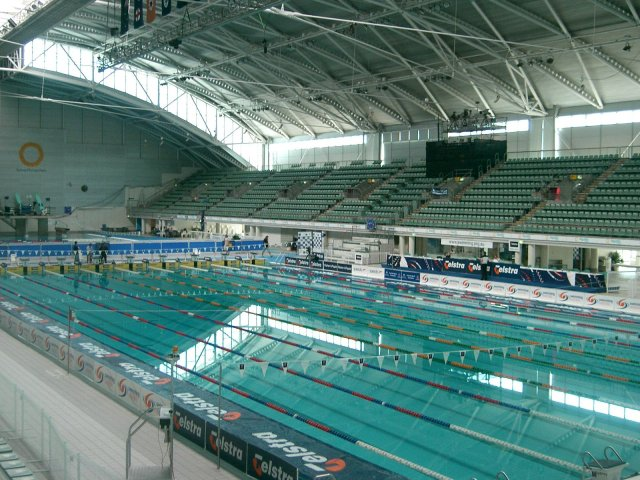
- Host city: Sydney, Australia
- Date: August 22–29, 1999
- Venue: Sydney International Aquatic Centre

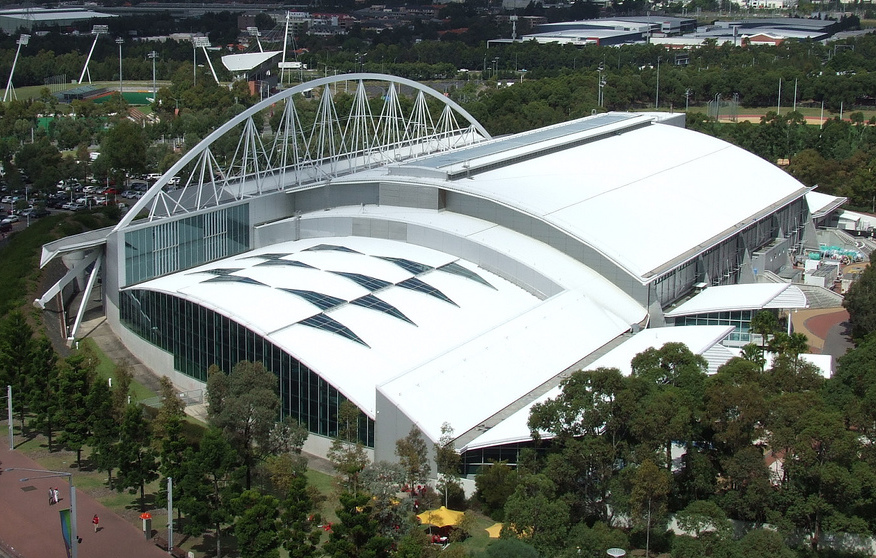
Sydney Olympic Park Aquatic Centre (AUS)

The eighth edition of the Pan Pacific Swimming Championships, a long course (50 m) event, was held in 1999 at the Sydney International Aquatic Centre in Sydney, Australia, from 22–29 August. Only two swimmers per country could compete in finals, and only four swimmers per country could compete in semi-finals.

== Results ==
=== Men's events ===
Event	Gold		Silver		Bronze	
50 m freestyle	Brendon Dedekind (RSA)	22.06; CR	Gary Hall Jr. (USA)	22.26	Bill Pilczuk (USA)	22.52
100 m freestyle	Michael Klim (AUS)	48.98	Neil Walker (USA)	49.17	Chris Fydler (AUS)	49.42
200 m freestyle	Ian Thorpe (AUS)	1:46.00; WR	Michael Klim (AUS)	1:47.40	Ryk Neethling (RSA)	1:48.17
400 m freestyle	Ian Thorpe (AUS)	3:41.83; WR	Grant Hackett (AUS)	3:46.02	Ryk Neethling (RSA)	3:46.31
1500 m freestyle	Grant Hackett (AUS)	14:45.60; CR	Ryk Neethling (RSA)	15:02.40	Chris Thompson (USA)	15:04.68
100 m backstroke	Lenny Krayzelburg (USA)	53.60; WR	Matt Welsh (AUS)	55.13; OC	Josh Watson (AUS)	55.18
200 m backstroke	Lenny Krayzelburg (USA)	1:55.87; WR	Ray Hass (AUS)	1:59.87	Cameron Delaney (AUS)	1:59.98
100 m breaststroke	Simon Cowley (AUS)	1:02.06	Regan Harrison (AUS)	1:02.26	Morgan Knabe (CAN)	1:02.37
200 m breaststroke	Simon Cowley (AUS)	2:12.98	Tom Wilkens (USA)	2:13.97	Terence Parkin (RSA)	2:14.12
100 m butterfly	Michael Klim (AUS)	52.49	Geoff Huegill (AUS)	52.51	Takashi Yamamoto (JPN)	52.93
200 m butterfly	Tom Malchow (USA)	1:55.41; CR, AM	Takashi Yamamoto (JPN)	1:57.33	Uğur Taner (USA)	1:57.82
200 m individual medley	Tom Wilkens (USA)	2:01.01	Curtis Myden (CAN)	2:01.64	Matthew Dunn (AUS)	2:01.86
400 m individual medley	Matthew Dunn (AUS)	4:16.54	Curtis Myden (CAN)	4:16.77	Tom Wilkens (USA)	4:18.58
4×100 m freestyle relay	Australia; Michael Klim (48.73) CR, OC; Jeff English (49.60); Chris Fydler (49.20); Ian Thorpe (48.55)	3:16.08; OC	United States; Bryan Jones (50.15); Josh Davis (48.93); Neil Walker (48.90); Jason Lezak (48.83)	3:16.81	Canada; Yannick Lupien (50.14); Craig Hutchison (50.65); Jake Steele (49.74); Graham Duthie (50.20)	3:20.73; NR
4×200 m freestyle relay	Australia; Ian Thorpe (1:46.28); Bill Kirby (1:48.96); Grant Hackett (1:46.30); Michael Klim (1:47.25)	7:08.79; WR	United States; Chad Carvin (1:48.67); Josh Davis (1:47.66); Tom Malchow (1:51.43); Uğur Taner (1:48.90)	7:16.66	Canada; Mark Johnston (1:51.13); Rick Say (1:49.73); Yannick Lupien (1:50.49); Brian Johns (1:51.91)	7:23.26
4×100 m medley relay	United States; Lenny Krayzelburg (53.67); Kurt Grote (1:01.69); Dod Wales (52.49); Neil Walker (48.52)	3:36.37; CR	Canada; Mark Versfeld (55.47); Morgan Knabe (1:01.54); Mike Mintenko (53.69); Yannick Lupien (49.48)	3:40.18	Japan; Atsushi Nishikori (55.72); Ryosuke Imai (1:02.14); Takashi Yamamoto (52.42); Shunsuke Ito (49.93)	3:40.21

Legend: WR – World record; CR – Championship record; CWR – Commonwealth record; NR – National record

=== Women's events ===
Event	Gold		Silver		Bronze	
50 m freestyle	Jenny Thompson (USA)	25.51	Sarah Ryan (AUS)	25.93	Liesl Kolbisen (USA)	25.97
100 m freestyle	Jenny Thompson (USA)	54.89	Sarah Ryan (AUS)	55.58 =OC	Rebecca Creedy (AUS)	55.90
200 m freestyle	Susie O'Neill (AUS)	1:58.17; OC	Lindsay Benko (USA)	1:59.60	Ellen Stonebraker (USA)	2:00.46
400 m freestyle	Brooke Bennett (USA)	4:08.39	Lindsay Benko (USA)	4:08.75	Claudia Poll (CRC)	4:11.53
800 m freestyle	Brooke Bennett (USA)	8:25.06	Rachel Harris (AUS)	8:37.23	Ellen Stonebraker (USA)	8:40.39
100 m backstroke	Dyana Calub (AUS) Mai Nakamura (JPN)	1:01.51; OC 1:01.51			Barbara Bedford (USA)	1:01.76
200 m backstroke	Tomoko Hagiwara (JPN)	2:11.36	Miki Nakao (JPN)	2:11.41	Lindsay Benko (USA)	2:13.51
100 m breaststroke	Penny Heyns (RSA)	1:07.08	Megan Quann (USA)	1:08.54	Kristy Kowal (USA)	1:08.56
200 m breaststroke	Penny Heyns (RSA)	2:23.64; WR	Kristy Kowal (USA)	2:25.52	Sarah Poewe (RSA)	2:25.90
100 m butterfly	Jenny Thompson (USA)	57.88; WR	Susie O'Neill (AUS)	59.07	Ayari Aoyama (JPN)	59.58
200 m butterfly	Susie O'Neill (AUS)	2:06.60	Jessica Deglau (CAN)	2:10.27	Misty Hyman (USA)	2:10.40
200 m individual medley	Joanne Malar (CAN)	2:13.63; NR	Cristina Teuscher (USA)	2:14.31	Elli Overton (AUS)	2:14.51
400 m individual medley	Joanne Malar (CAN)	4:40.23	Yasuko Tajima (JPN)	4:40.56	Cristina Teuscher (USA)	4:41.21
4×100 m freestyle relay	United States; Liesl Kolbisen (56.26); Richelle Fox (55.80); Lindsay Benko (55.53); Jenny Thompson (54.27)	3:41.86	Australia; Sarah Ryan (56.10); Lori Munz (56.06); Rebecca Creedy (55.87); Susie O'Neill (54.66)	3:42.69	Canada; Jessica Deglau (56.74); Marianne Limpert (55.80); Anna Lydall (56.24); Laura Nicholls (55.72)	3:44.50; NR
4×200 m freestyle relay	United States; Lindsay Benko (1:58.86); Ellen Stonebraker (1:59.68); Jenny Thompson (2:00.02); Cristina Teuscher (1:59.05)	7:57.61; CR, AM	Australia; Giaan Rooney (2:00.62); Rebecca Creedy (2:01.32); Lori Munz (1:59.57); Susie O'Neill (1:59.16)	8:00.67; OC	Canada; Jessica Deglau (2:02.55); Joanne Malar (2:00.99); Marianne Limpert (2:02.02); Laura Nicholls (2:01.30)	8:06.86
4×100 m medley relay	United States; Barbara Bedford (1:01.53); Megan Quann (1:07.55); Jenny Thompson (58.00); Liesl Kolbisen (56.01)	4:03.09	Australia; Dyana Calub (1:02.24); Samantha Riley (1:09.35); Susie O'Neill (58.87); Sarah Ryan (55.28)	4:05.74	Japan; Mai Nakamura (1:01.68); Masami Tanaka (1:09.57); Ayari Aoyama (1:00.26); Suzu Chiba (55.63)	4:07.14

Legend: WR – World record; CR – Championship record; NR – National record

== Medal table ==
Rank	Nation	Gold	Silver	Bronze	Total
1	Australia (AUS)	13	13	6	32
2	United States (USA)	13	10	12	35
3	South Africa (RSA)	3	1	4	8
4	Canada (CAN)	2	4	5	11
5	Japan (JPN)	2	3	4	9
6	Costa Rica (CRC)	0	0	1	1
Totals (6 entries)		33	31	32	96

== Awards ==
- Rookie of the Meet: Megan Quann (USA) (100 m breaststroke)
- Male Swimmer of the Meet: Ian Thorpe (AUS) (400 m freestyle)
- Female Swimmer of the Meet: Penny Heyns (RSA) (200 m breaststroke)

(determined by FINA points)
