= Keitaro Konnai =

Japanese swimmer (born 1978)

Personal information
- Full name: 近内 圭太郎
- Nationality: Japan
- Born: August 5, 1978 (age 48) Kanagawa
- Height: 1.77 m (5 ft 10 in)
- Weight: 72 kg (159 lb)

Sport
- Sport: Swimming
- Strokes: Backstroke
- Club: Kamakura Swimming School
Medal record
Men's swimming
World Student Games
Silver medal – second place	1999 Mallorca	100 m backstroke

Keitaro Konnai (近内 圭太郎, Konnai Keitarō; born August 5, 1978 in Kanagawa) is a retired male backstroke swimmer from Japan. He represented his native country at the 1996 Summer Olympics in Atlanta, Georgia.
