= Tatsuya Kinugasa =

Japanese swimmer (born 1974)

Personal information
- Native name: 衣笠 竜也
- Born: October 8, 1974 (age 51)
- Height: 1.80 m (5 ft 11 in)
- Weight: 73 kg (161 lb)

Sport
- Sport: Swimming
- Strokes: Medley
Medal record
Men's swimming
Summer Universiade
| Gold medal – first place | 1997 Catania | 200m Individual Medley |
| Gold medal – first place | 1997 Catania | 400m Individual Medley |
| Silver medal – second place | 1995 Fukuoka | 400m Individual Medley |
| Bronze medal – third place | 1993 Buffalo | 400m Individual Medley |

Tatsuya Kinugasa (衣笠 竜也, Kinugasa Tatsuya; born October 8, 1974) is a Japanese retired medley swimmer.

== Swimming career ==
Kinugasa represented Japan at two consecutive Summer Olympics, starting in 1992. He is best known for winning two gold medals at the 1997 Summer Universiade in Catania, Italy.

Despite being of Japanese nationality he won the 200 metres medley title and the 400 metres medley title in 1997, at the ASA National British Championships.
