= Ray Hass =

Australian swimmer

Medal record

Representing Australia

Men's swimming

World Championships (SC)
Gold medal – first place	2002 Moscow	4x200m Freestyle

Pan Pacific Championships
Silver medal – second place	1999 Sydney	200m Backstroke

Ray Hass is a former Australian backstroke swimmer. Originally from South Africa, Hass immigrated to Australia with his family in 1993 and was an Australian Institute of Sport scholarship holder.

== Swimming career ==
After swimming the heat of the 4 × 200 m freestyle relay at the 2001 World Aquatics Championships in Fukuoka, Japan, Hass was a spectator for the final, when the Australians set a world record of 7:04.66 mins. He went on to swim in the semifinal of the 200 m backstroke finishing 9th. At the 2002 FINA Short Course World Championships, Hass won a gold medal for Australia as part of the 4 × 200 m freestyle relay, swimming alongside compatriots Leon Dunne, Todd Pearson and Grant Hackett.
