= Owen Von Richter =

Canadian swimmer

Personal information
- Full name: Owen Von Richter
- National team: Canada
- Born: April 7, 1975 (age 51) Calgary, Alberta
- Height: 1.91 m (6 ft 3 in)
- Weight: 81 kg (179 lb)

Sport
- Sport: Swimming
- Strokes: Medley
- Club: Etobicoke Swim Club
- College team: University of Michigan
Medal record
Men's swimming
Representing Canada
Pan American Games
Bronze medal – third place	1999 Winnipeg	200 m medley
Bronze medal – third place	1999 Winnipeg	400 m medley

Owen Von Richter (born April 7, 1975) is a Canadian former competitive swimmer who swam in the mixed-stroke medley events in international championships. Von Richter represented Canada at the 2000 Summer Olympics in Sydney, Australia, where he placed 29th in the men's 400-metre individual medley event, clocking 4:25.70 in the preliminary heats.

He previously won a pair of bronze medals in the 200- and 400-metre individual medley events at the 1999 Pan American Games in Winnipeg.

Owen is now a Managing Director at RBC Capital Markets.

== See also ==
- List of University of Michigan alumni
