= Dustin Hersee =

Canadian swimmer

Personal information
- Full name: Dustin Hersee
- National team: Canada
- Born: August 14, 1975 (age 50) Vancouver, British Columbia
- Height: 1.91 m (6 ft 3 in)
- Weight: 84 kg (185 lb)

Sport
- Sport: Swimming
- Strokes: Backstroke
- Club: Pacific Dolphins
- College team: University of British Columbia

Dustin Hersee (born August 14, 1975) is a former backstroke swimmer from Canada, who competed at the 2000 Summer Olympics in Sydney, Australia. There he ended up in 20th place in the men's 200-metre backstroke event, clocking 2:01.34 in the preliminary heats.

He worked at St. George's Senior School Vancouver coaching the competitive, learning, and provincial groups there, until he left in 2015. Hersee started in 2001 as the full-time physical education teacher and aquatics director at St. George's School. As head of aquatics, He and his coaching staff have led the St. George's Swim team to 12 consecutive provincial championships, and also coaches the snowboard team. Hersee enjoys yoga, surfing, biking, and ocean swimming in his spare time.
