= Robert van der Zant =

Australian swimmer

Personal information
- Full name: Robert Cornelius van der Zant
- Nickname: Rob
- National team: Australia
- Born: 2 February 1975 (age 51) Brisbane, Queensland
- Height: 1.86 m (6 ft 1 in)
- Weight: 81 kg (179 lb)

Sport
- Sport: Swimming
- Strokes: Medley
Medal record
Men's swimming
Representing Australia
World Championships (SC)
| Silver medal – second place | 1995 Rio de Janeiro | 4x100m medley |

Robert Cornelius van der Zant (born 2 February 1975) is a former medley swimmer who competed for Australia at the 2000 Summer Olympics in Sydney. There he finished in fourteenth position in the 200-metre individual medley.

== See also ==
- List of Commonwealth Games medallists in swimming (men)
