= Sydney Olympic Park Aquatic Centre =

Sports venue in Sydney, Australia

- SIAC, SOPAC
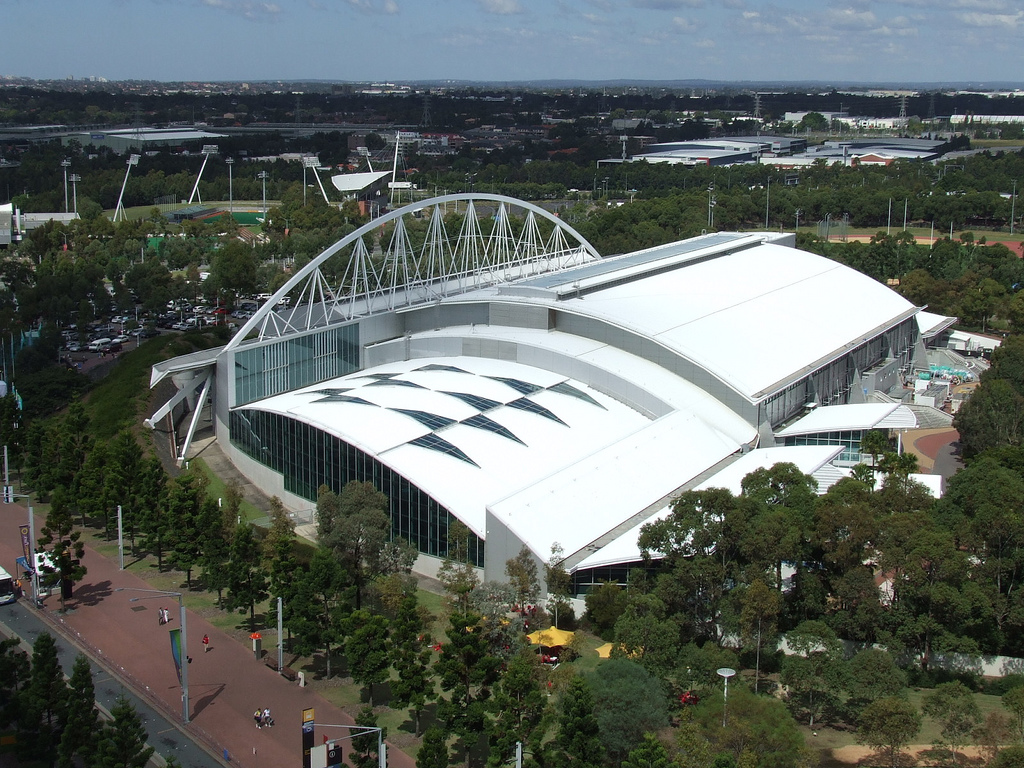
- Aerial view of the Sydney Olympic Park Aquatic Centre
- Interactive map of Sydney Olympic Park Aquatic Centre
- Full name: Sydney Olympic Park Aquatic Centre
- Former names: Sydney International Aquatic Centre
- Address: Sydney, Australia
- Coordinates: 33°51′1″S 151°4′7″E
- Capacity: 10,000

Construction
- Built: April 1992
- Opened: August 1994
- Architect: COX Architecture

The Sydney Olympic Park Aquatic Centre (SOPAC), formerly Sydney International Aquatic Centre (SIAC), is a swimming venue located in the Sydney Olympic Park in Sydney, New South Wales, Australia. Built in 1994, the SOPAC was a major venue for the 2000 Summer Olympics as it hosted the swimming, diving, synchronized swimming, the medal events for water polo, and the swimming portion of the modern pentathlon competitions. The SOPAC has since been a host venue for numerous schools and swimming associations around New South Wales. Currently, it has most notably been the venue for the annual CAS Swimming Championships. It is also scheduled to be the site of the 2022 Duel in the Pool. The SOPAC also includes a swim shop at the entry of the arena, a play area, a health club and operates swimming classes for all ages.

The arena currently holds 10,000 people. Capacity was boosted to 17,000 during the 2000 Summer Olympics.

== 2013 Fire ==
In October 2013, a large grass fire ripped through the centre's carpark, destroying more than 40 cars, one motorcycle and forcing 1,500 people to evacuate.

== 2024 Roof Fire ==
In Mid 2024, a solar panel issue sparked a fire on the roof of the Aquatic Centre. The centre and swimming competition at the time was evacuated.

== SOPAC Swim Club ==
Sydney Olympic Park Aquatic Centre's Swim Club or SOPAC Swim Club, is a high performance squad program and club run by Swimming NSW. The coaching team consists of: Matthew Brown, Ryan Frost, Daniel Benvenuti, Pancha Thambo and William Choi. The club has often placed in the top 5 of the Senior and Junior State/Metropolitan Championship pointscores.

== Gallery ==
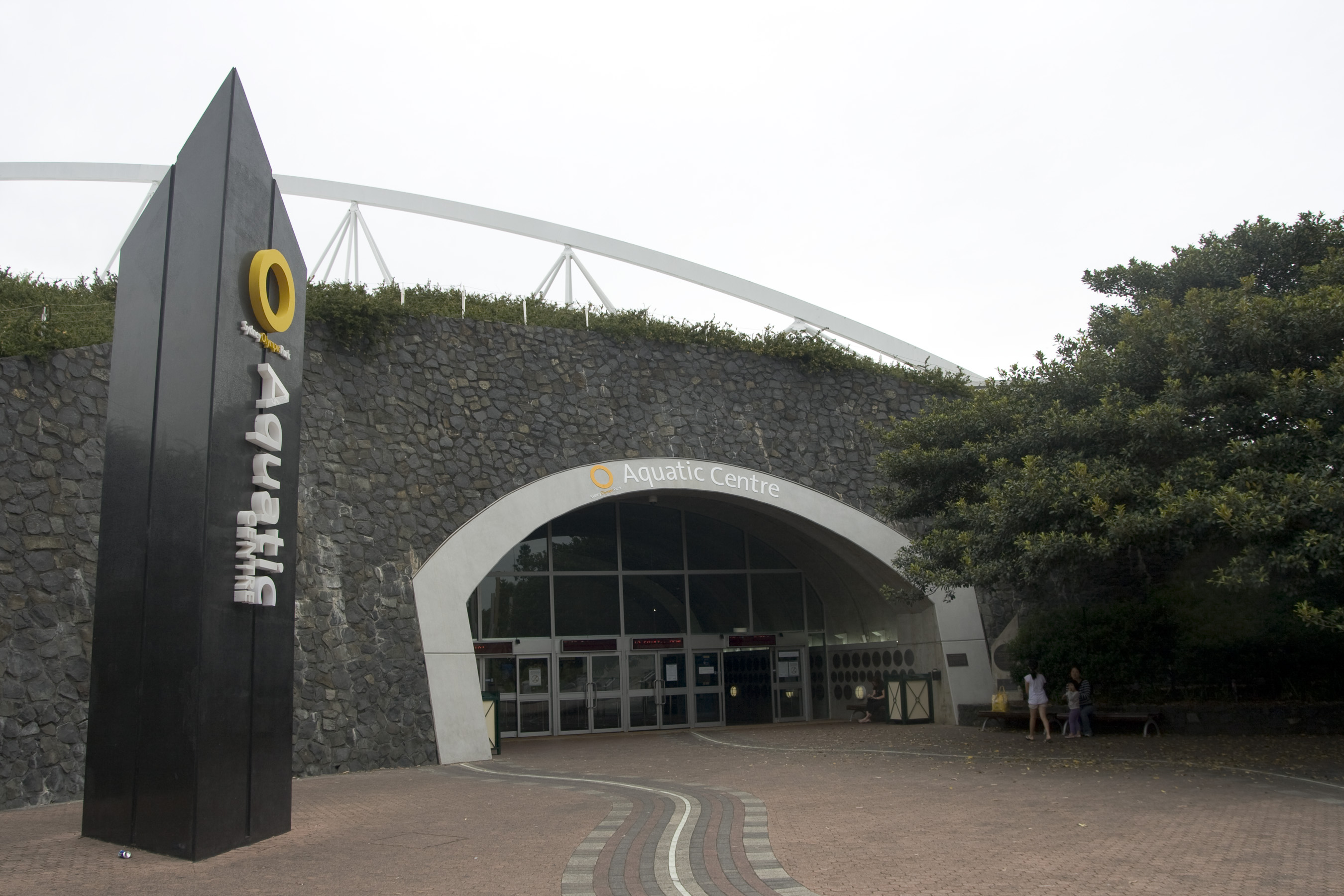
Entrance

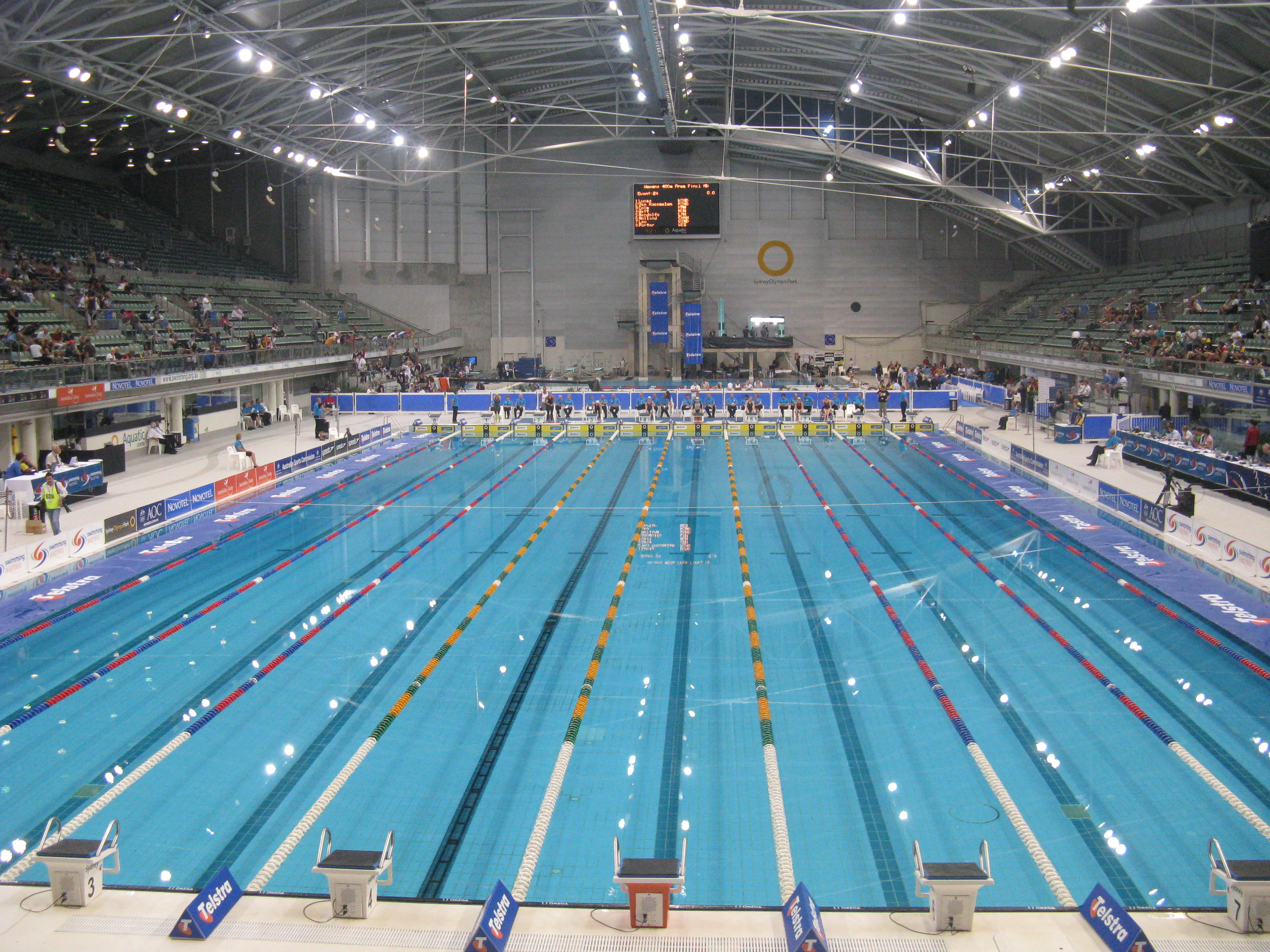
Main pool prior to a competition

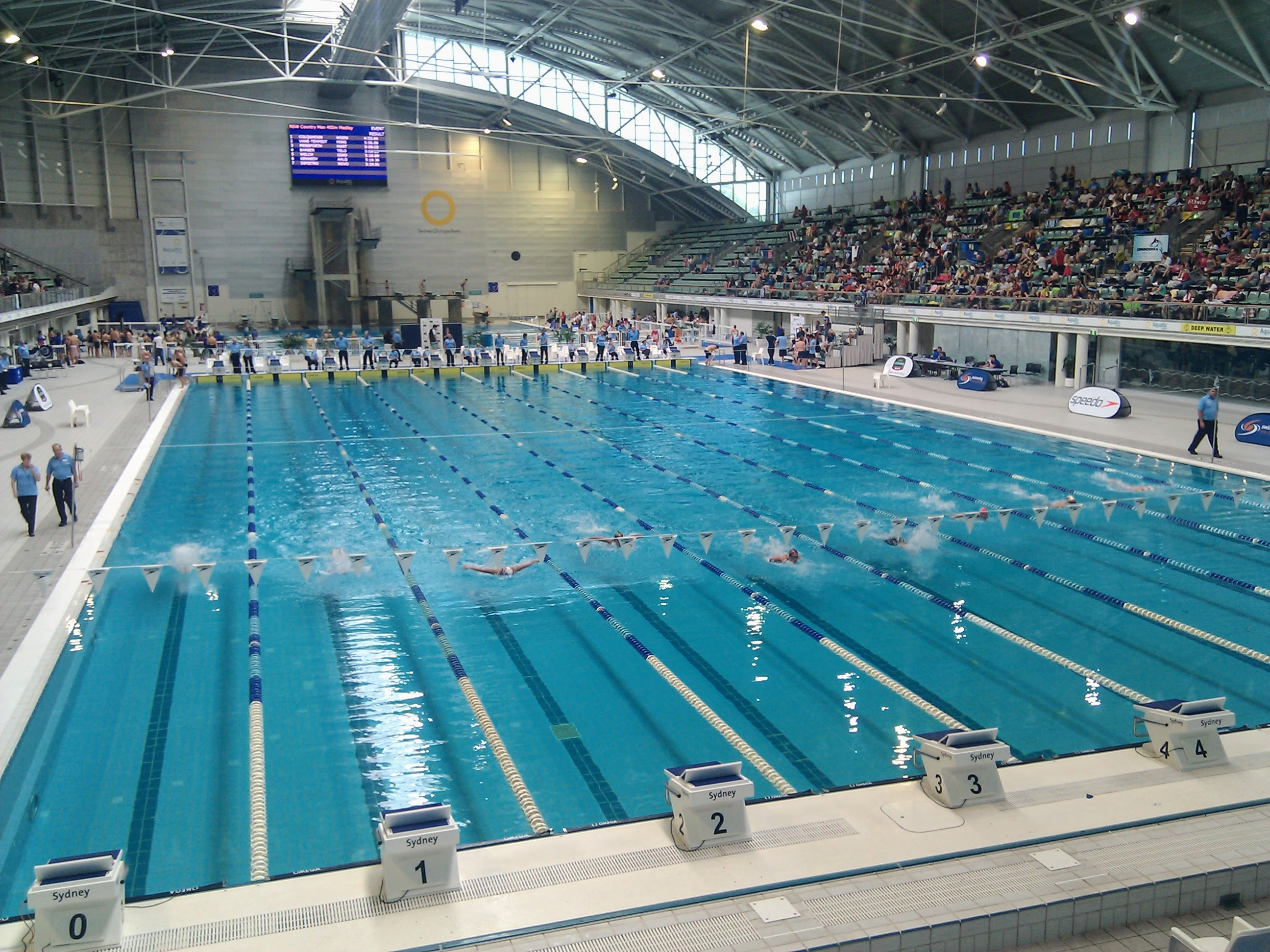
Main pool during a competition

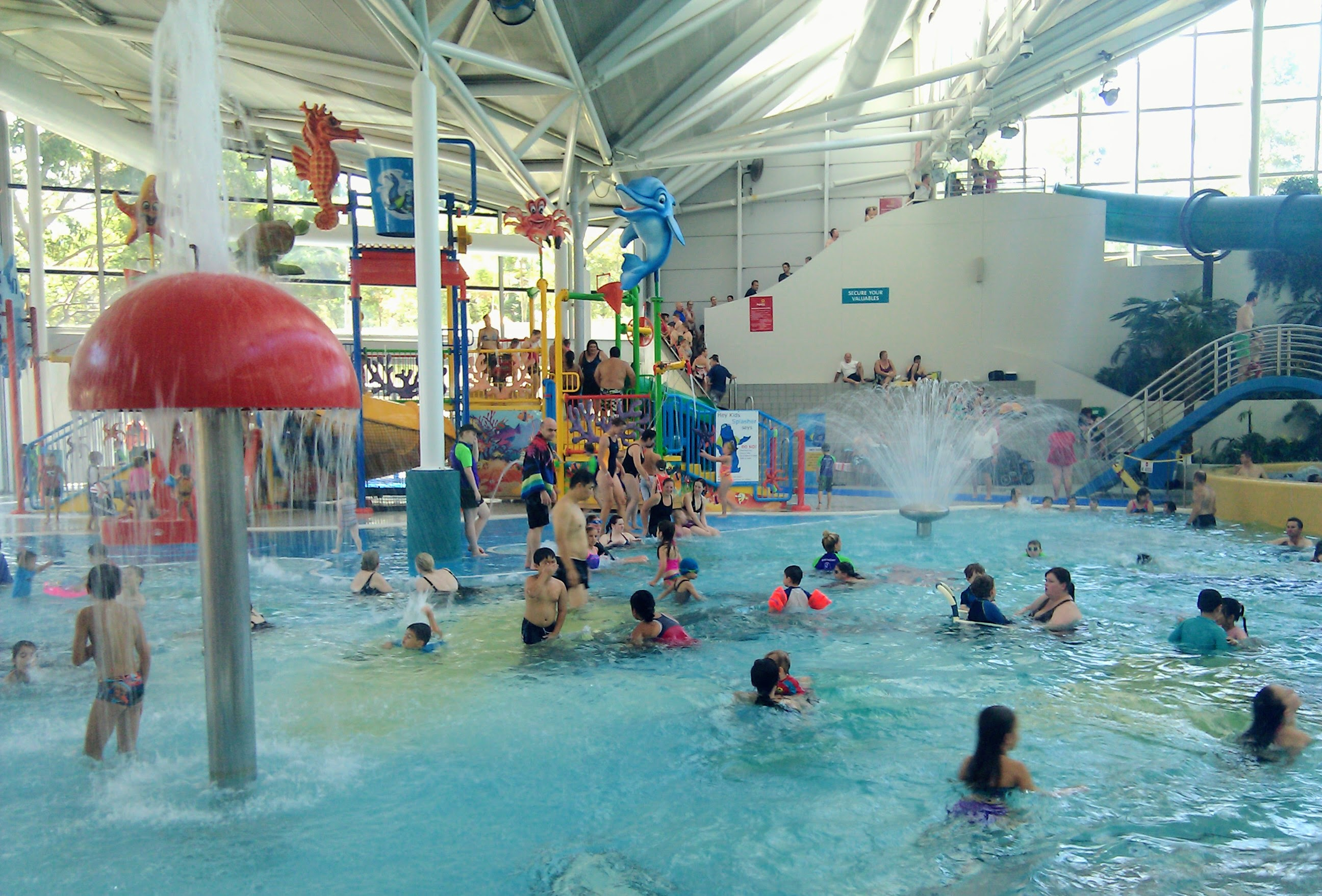
Water park

== See also ==
- 2000 Summer Olympics venues
- List of sports venues in Australia
