= Brad Bridgewater =

American swimmer (born 1973)

Personal information
- Full name: Bradley Michael Bridgewater
- National team: United States
- Born: March 29, 1973 (age 53) Charleston, West Virginia, U.S.
- Height: 6 ft 3 in (1.91 m)
- Weight: 185 lb (84 kg)

Sport
- Sport: Swimming
- Strokes: Backstroke
- Club: Trojan Swim Club
- College team: University of Texas; University of Southern California
Medal record
Men's swimming
Representing the United States
Olympic Games
Gold medal – first place	1996 Atlanta	200 m backstroke
World Championships (SC)
Silver medal – second place	2000 Athens	200 m backstroke
Pan Pacific Championships
Bronze medal – third place	1997 Fukuoka	200 m backstroke
Pan American Games
Gold medal – first place	1995 Mar del Plata	200 m backstroke

Bradley Michael Bridgewater (born March 29, 1973) is an American former competition swimmer who won the gold medal in the men's 200-meter backstroke at the 1996 Atlanta Olympics.

Bridgewater attended Lake Mary High School in Lake Mary, Florida, and was coached by 1972 Olympic gold medalist Fred Tyler. In college, he swam for the Texas Longhorns swimming and diving team of the University of Texas from 1992 to 1994, then transferred to the University of Southern California (USC). Under Trojans coach Mark Schubert, Bridgewater earned 1995 and 1996 All-America honors in the 100- and 200-meter backstroke.

At the 1996 Summer Olympics in Atlanta, Bridgewater won the gold medal in men's 200-meter backstroke with a time of 1:58.54, beating fellow American and rival Tripp Schwenk by .45 seconds.

Bridgewater currently serves as vice-president for Dallas, Texas investment management firm PHH Investments.

== See also ==
- List of Olympic medalists in swimming (men)
- List of University of Southern California people
- List of University of Texas at Austin alumni
