= 1997 Pan Pacific Swimming Championships – Men's 100 metre freestyle =

Men's 100 metre freestyle at the 1997 Pan Pacific Swimming Championships
- Venue: NISHI Civic Pool
- Dates: August 11, 1997 (heats & finals)
- Competitors: 23 from 9 nations
- Winning time: 49.46

Medalists
gold medal	Michael Klim	Australia
silver medal	Neil Walker	United States
bronze medal	Ricardo Busquets	Puerto Rico

The men's 100 metre freestyle competition at the 1997 Pan Pacific Swimming Championships took place on August 11 at the NISHI Civic Pool. The last champion was Gary Hall, Jr. of US.

This race consisted of two lengths of the pool, both lengths being in freestyle.

== Records ==
Prior to this competition, the existing world and Pan Pacific records were as follows:

World record	Alexander Popov (RUS)	48.21	Monte Carlo, Monaco	June 18, 1994
Pan Pacific Championships record	Matt Biondi (USA)	49.17	Tokyo, Japan	August 16, 1985

== Results ==
All times are in minutes and seconds.

KEY:	q	Fastest non-qualifiers	Q	Qualified	CR	Championships record	NR	National record	PB	Personal best	SB	Seasonal best

=== Heats ===
The first round was held on August 11.

Rank	Name	Nationality	Time	Notes
1	Michael Klim	Australia	49.52	QA, OC
2	Ricardo Busquets	Puerto Rico	50.00	QA
3	Neil Walker	United States	50.06	QA
4	Scott Tucker	United States	50.15	QA
5	Stephen Clarke	Canada	50.27	QA
6	Jon Olsen	United States	50.31	QA
7	Brad Schumacher	United States	50.36	QA
8	David Fox	United States	50.45	QA
9	Uğur Taner	United States	50.61	QB
10	Ian van der Wal	Australia	50.72	QB
11	Sion Brinn	Jamaica	50.82	QB
12	Craig Hutchison	Canada	50.87	QB
12	Richard Upton	Australia	50.87	QB
14	John Steel	New Zealand	51.03	QB
15	Trent Bray	New Zealand	51.06	QB
16	Scott Logan	Australia	51.10	QB
17	Shunsuke Ito	Japan	51.13	
18	Nicholas Tongue	New Zealand	51.31	
19	Yukihiro Matsushita	Japan	51.38	
20	Jiang Chengji	China	51.67	
20	Nate Dusing	United States	51.67	
20	Brendon Dedekind	South Africa	51.67	
23	Dustin Hersee	Canada	51.75	

=== B Final ===
The B final was held on August 11.

Rank	Name	Nationality	Time	Notes
9	Jon Olsen	United States	49.95	
10	Richard Upton	Australia	51.13	
11	John Steel	New Zealand	51.18	
11	Nicholas Tongue	New Zealand	51.18	
13	Trent Bray	New Zealand	51.27	
14	Shunsuke Ito	Japan	51.36	
15	Yukihiro Matsushita	Japan	51.38	
16	Jiang Chengji	China	51.50	

=== A Final ===
The A final was held on August 11.

Rank	Lane	Nationality	Time	Notes
1st place, gold medalist(s)	Michael Klim	Australia	49.46	OC
2nd place, silver medalist(s)	Neil Walker	United States	49.57	
3rd place, bronze medalist(s)	Ricardo Busquets	Puerto Rico	49.94	
4	Stephen Clarke	Canada	50.06	NR
5	Scott Tucker	United States	50.17	
6	Sion Brinn	Jamaica	50.32	
7	Ian van der Wal	Australia	50.71	
8	Craig Hutchison	Canada	51.21	
