= 1997 Pan Pacific Swimming Championships – Men's 4 × 100 metre freestyle relay =

Men's 4 × 100 metre freestyle relay at the 1997 Pan Pacific Swimming Championships
- Venue: NISHI Civic Pool
- Dates: August 12, 1997 (heats & finals)
- Winning time: 3:18.18

Medalists
gold medal	Scott Tucker, Brad Schumacher, Jon Olsen and Neil Walker	United States
silver medal	Michael Klim, Richard Upton, Scott Logan and Ian van der Wal	Australia
bronze medal	John Steel, Nicholas Tongue, Danyon Loader and Trent Bray	New Zealand

The men's 4 × 100 metre freestyle relay competition at the 1997 Pan Pacific Swimming Championships took place on August 12 at the NISHI Civic Pool. The last champion was the United States.

This race consisted of eight lengths of the pool. Each of the four swimmers completed two lengths of the pool. The first swimmer had to touch the wall before the second could leave the starting block.

== Records ==
Prior to this competition, the existing world and Pan Pacific records were as follows:

World record	United States (USA); David Fox (49.32); Joe Hudepohl (49.11); Jon Olsen (48.17); Gary Hall, Jr. (48.51)	3:15.11	Atlanta, United States	August 12, 1995
Pan Pacific Championships record	United States (USA); David Fox (49.32); Joe Hudepohl (49.11); Jon Olsen (48.17); Gary Hall, Jr. (48.51)	3:15.11	Atlanta, United States	August 12, 1995

== Results ==
All times are in minutes and seconds.

KEY:	q	Fastest non-qualifiers	Q	Qualified	CR	Championships record	NR	National record	PB	Personal best	SB	Seasonal best

=== Heats ===
Heats weren't performed, as only five teams had entered.

=== Final ===
The final was held on August 12.

Rank	Name	Nationality	Time	Notes
1st place, gold medalist(s)	Scott Tucker (49.86); Brad Schumacher (49.66); Jon Olsen (49.69); Neil Walker (48.97)	United States	3:18.18	
2nd place, silver medalist(s)	Michael Klim (49.15); Richard Upton (50.11); Scott Logan (50.21); Ian van der Wal (49.86)	Australia	3:19.33	
3rd place, bronze medalist(s)	John Steel (51.16); Nicholas Tongue (50.55); Danyon Loader (51.01); Trent Bray (49.77)	New Zealand	3:22.49	
4	Stephen Clarke (50.54); Craig Hutchison (50.27); Dustin Hersee (51.36); Edward Parenti (51.23)	Canada	3:23.40	
5	Shunsuke Ito (51.04); Tomohiro Yamanoi (51.32); Yosuke Ichikawa (51.26); Yukihiro Matsushita (50.17)	Japan	3:23.79	
