= Swimming at the 1998 World Aquatics Championships – Men's 4 × 100 metre freestyle relay =

Men's 4×100 metre freestyle relay at the 1998 FINA World Championships
- Date: 15 January 1998
- Teams: 14
- Winning time: 3 minutes 16.69 seconds

Medalists
gold medal	Scott Tucker; Neil Walker; Jon Olsen; Gary Hall, Jr.	United States
silver medal	Michael Klim; Adam Pine; Richard Upton; Chris Fydler	Australia
bronze medal	Alexander Popov; Roman Yegorov; Vladislav Kulikov; Denis Pimankov	Russia

The final and the qualifying heats of the men's 4×100 metre freestyle relay event at the 1998 World Aquatics Championships were held on Thursday 1998-01-15 in Perth, Western Australia.

== Final ==
Rank	Team	Time
Gold medal	UNITED STATES; Scott Tucker; Neil Walker; Jon Olsen; Gary Hall, Jr.	3:16.69 CR; 49.80; 48.75; 49.48; 48.66
Silver medal	AUSTRALIA; Michael Klim; Adam Pine; Richard Upton; Chris Fydler	3:16.97; 49.27; 49.47; 49.64; 48.59
Bronze medal	RUSSIA; Alexander Popov; Roman Yegorov; Vladislav Kulikov; Denis Pimankov	3:18.45; 48.74 CR; 49.67; 51.28; 48.76
4	GERMANY; Christian Keller; Christian Tröger; Stefan Herbst; Torsten Spanneberg	3:18.83; 50.78; 49.37; 49.57; 49.11
5	NETHERLANDS; Mark Veens; Martijn Zuijdweg; Johan Kenkhuis; Pieter van den Hoogenband	3:19.47; 50.83; 50.17; 50.14; 48.38
6	BRAZIL; Fernando Scherer; Edvaldo Valério; André Cordeiro; Gustavo Borges	3:20.36; 50.63; 50.83; 50.19; 48.71
7	GREAT BRITAIN; Gavin Meadows; Mike Fibbens; James Salter; Nick Shackell	3:21.45; 50.32; 50.28; 50.49; 50.36
8	ITALY; Lorenzo Vismara; Mauro Gallo; Simone Cercato; Massimiliano Rosolino	3:22.12; 50.16; 51.01; 50.25; 50.70

== Qualifying heats ==
=== Heat 1 ===
Rank	Team	Time
1	GERMANY; Stefan Herbst; Steffen Zesner; Lars Conrad; Torsten Spanneberg	3:20.55; 50.47; 50.51; 49.99; 49.58
2	UNITED STATES; Bryan Jones; Jon Olsen; Bryan Schumacher; Gary Hall, Jr.	3:20.76; 50.99; 49.73; 50.04; 50.00
3	NETHERLANDS; Bram van Haandel; Martijn Zuijdweg; Johan Kenkhuis; Mark Veens	3:21.46; 51.41; 50.08; 49.91; 50.06
4	ITALY; Mauro Gallo; Alessandro Bacchi; Lorenzo Vismara; Simone Cercato	3:21.60; 51.28; 50.62; 49.61; 50.09
5	UZBEKISTAN; Ravil Nachaev; Oleg Pukhnaty; Sergey Erilin; Alexey Makhantsev	3:32.63; 52.46; 52.41; 54.19; 53.57
6	IRAN; Hamidreza Mobarrez; Amir Saleh Azadi Namin; Behzad Mehdi Khabazian; Pirouz Eftekhar Manavi	3:49.26; 56.89; 58.59; 57.45; 56.33
7	SWEDEN; Johan Walberg; Lars Frölander; Fredrik Letzler; Jonas Åkesson	DSQ; 50.88; 49.12; 50.40 —

=== Heat 2 ===
Rank	Team	Time
1	BRAZIL; Fernando Scherer; Edvaldo Valério; André Cordeiro; Gustavo Borges	3:21.08; 50.34; 51.06; 50.41; 49.27
2	AUSTRALIA; Adam Pine; Richard Upton; Nathan Rickard; Anthony Rogis	3:21.36; 50.48; 49.82; 50.11; 50.95
3	RUSSIA; Roman Yegorov; Vladislav Kulikov; Maxim Korshunov; Denis Pimankov	3:21.58; 50.94; 50.83; 50.87; 48.94
4	GREAT BRITAIN; Nick Shackell; Gavin Meadows; James Salter; Mike Fibbens	3:22.03; 50.88; 49.89; 50.70; 50.56
5	NEW ZEALAND; Nicholas Tongue; John Steel; Danyon Loader; Trent Bray	3:23.38; 52.24; 50.75; 50.50; 49.89
6	SPAIN; Juan Benavides; José Rojano; Juan José Torrado; Javier Botello	3:24.50; 51.58; 50.96; 51.44; 50.52
7	CHINESE TAIPEI; Huang-Chih Yung; Hung-Chieh Chih; Li-Yun Lun; Wu-Nien Pen	3:39.43; 53.18; 54.93; 55.23; 56.09

== See also ==
- 1996 Men's Olympic Games 4x100m Freestyle (Atlanta)
- 1997 Men's World Championships (SC) 4x100m Freestyle (Gothenburg)
- 1997 Men's European Championships (LC) 4x100m Freestyle (Seville)
- 2000 Men's Olympic Games 4x100m Freestyle (Sydney)
