= 1999 Pan Pacific Swimming Championships – Men's 4 × 100 metre freestyle relay =

Men's 4 × 100 metre freestyle relay at the 1999 Pan Pacific Swimming Championships
- Venue: Sydney International Aquatic Centre
- Dates: August 22, 1999 (heats & finals)
- Winning time: 3:16.08

Medalists
| gold medal | Michael Klim, Jeff English, Chris Fydler and Ian Thorpe | Australia |
| silver medal | Bryan Jones, Josh Davis, Neil Walker and Jason Lezak | United States |
| bronze medal | Yannick Lupien, Craig Hutchison, Jake Steele and Graham Duthie | Canada |

The men's 4 × 100 metre freestyle relay competition at the 1999 Pan Pacific Swimming Championships took place on August 22 at the Sydney International Aquatic Centre. The last champion was the United States.

This race consisted of eight lengths of the pool. Each of the four swimmers completed two lengths of the pool. The first swimmer had to touch the wall before the second could leave the starting block.

== Records ==
Prior to this competition, the existing world and Pan Pacific records were as follows:

| World record | United States (USA); David Fox (49.32); Joe Hudepohl (49.11); Jon Olsen (48.17); Gary Hall, Jr. (48.51) | 3:15.11 | Atlanta, United States | August 12, 1995 |
| Pan Pacific Championships record | United States (USA); David Fox (49.32); Joe Hudepohl (49.11); Jon Olsen (48.17); Gary Hall, Jr. (48.51) | 3:15.11 | Atlanta, United States | August 12, 1995 |

== Results ==
All times are in minutes and seconds.

| KEY: | q | Fastest non-qualifiers | Q | Qualified | CR | Championships record | NR | National record | PB | Personal best | SB | Seasonal best |

=== Heats ===
Heats weren't performed, as only seven teams had entered.

=== Final ===
The final was held on August 22.

| Rank | Name | Nationality | Time | Notes |
|---|---|---|---|---|
| 1st place, gold medalist(s) | Michael Klim (48.73 CWR); Jeff English (49.60); Chris Fydler (49.20); Ian Thorpe (48.55) | Australia | 3:16.08 | CWR |
| 2nd place, silver medalist(s) | Bryan Jones (50.15); Josh Davis (48.93); Neil Walker (48.90); Jason Lezak (48.83) | United States | 3:16.81 | |
| 3rd place, bronze medalist(s) | Yannick Lupien (50.14); Craig Hutchison (50.65); Jake Steele (49.74); Graham Duthie (50.20) | Canada | 3:20.73 | NR |
| 4 | Nicholas Folker (50.40); Brendon Dedekind (50.24); Ryk Neethling (50.37); Greg Main-Baillie (51.03) | South Africa | 3:22.04 | |
| 5 | Ryo Takayasu (52.83); Tomohiro Yamanoi (51.71); Takeshi Sasaki (51.56); Shunsuke Ito (49.86) | Japan | 3:25.96 | |
| 6 | Brad Herring (52.41); Nicholas Sheeran (51.87); Steven Ferguson (52.36); Scott Rice (51.30) | New Zealand | 3:27.94 | |
| 7 | - - - - | Chinese Taipei | 3:46.29 | |
