= 1997 Pan Pacific Swimming Championships – Men's 4 × 100 metre medley relay =

Men's 4 × 100 metre medley relay at the 1997 Pan Pacific Swimming Championships
- Venue: NISHI Civic Pool
- Dates: August 13, 1997 (heats & finals)
- Winning time: 3:36.93

Medalists
gold medal	Lenny Krayzelburg, Kurt Grote, Nate Dusing and Neil Walker	United States
silver medal	Adrian Radley, Phil Rogers, Scott Goodman and Michael Klim	Australia
bronze medal	Mark Versfeld, Morgan Knabe, Edward Parenti and Stephen Clarke	Canada

The men's 4 × 100 metre medley relay competition at the 1997 Pan Pacific Swimming Championships took place on August 13 at the NISHI Civic Pool. The last champion was the United States.

== Records ==
Prior to this competition, the existing world and Pan Pacific records were as follows:

World record	United States (USA); Jeff Rouse (53.95); Jeremy Linn (1:00.32); Mark Henderson (52.39); Gary Hall, Jr. (48.18)	3:34.84	Atlanta, United States	July 26, 1996
Pan Pacific Championships record	United States (USA); Jeff Rouse (54.58); Eric Wunderlich (1:01.67); Mark Henderson (52.84); Gary Hall, Jr. (47.95)	3:37.04	Atlanta, United States	August 13, 1995

== Results ==
All times are in minutes and seconds.

KEY:	q	Fastest non-qualifiers	Q	Qualified	CR	Championships record	NR	National record	PB	Personal best	SB	Seasonal best

=== Heats ===
Heats weren't performed, as only seven teams had entered.

=== Final ===
The final was held on August 13.

Rank	Name	Nationality	Time	Notes
1st place, gold medalist(s)	Lenny Krayzelburg (54.74); Kurt Grote (1:00.59); Nate Dusing (52.67); Neil Walker (49.03)	United States	3:36.93	CR
2nd place, silver medalist(s)	Adrian Radley (56.01); Phil Rogers (1:01.78); Scott Goodman (53.34); Michael Klim (48.60)	Australia	3:39.73	
3rd place, bronze medalist(s)	Mark Versfeld (56.35); Morgan Knabe (1:04.28); Edward Parenti (53.92); Stephen Clarke (49.53)	Canada	3:43.98	
4	Russ Dunwoody (58.18); Oliver Young (1:07.07); John Steel (56.76); Nicholas Tongue (50.92)	New Zealand	3:52.93	
5	- - - -	Uzbekistan	4:00.54	
6	- - - -	Hong Kong	4:01.22	
7	Keitaro Konnai (56.68) - - -	Japan	DSQ	
