= 1999 Pan Pacific Swimming Championships – Men's 100 metre freestyle =

Men's 100 metre freestyle at the 1999 Pan Pacific Swimming Championships
- Venue: Sydney International Aquatic Centre
- Dates: August 25, 1999 (heats & semifinals); August 26, 1999 (final)
- Competitors: 40 from 10 nations
- Winning time: 48.98

Medalists
gold medal	Michael Klim	Australia
silver medal	Neil Walker	United States
bronze medal	Chris Fydler	Australia

The men's 100 metre freestyle competition at the 1999 Pan Pacific Swimming Championships took place on August 25–26 at the Sydney International Aquatic Centre. The last champion was Michael Klim of Australia.

This race consisted of two lengths of the pool, both lengths being in freestyle.

== Records ==
Prior to this competition, the existing world and Pan Pacific records were as follows:

World record	Alexander Popov (RUS)	48.21	Monte Carlo, Monaco	June 18, 1994
Pan Pacific Championships record	Matt Biondi (USA)	49.17	Tokyo, Japan	August 16, 1985

== Results ==
All times are in minutes and seconds.

KEY:	q	Fastest non-qualifiers	Q	Qualified	CR	Championships record	NR	National record	PB	Personal best	SB	Seasonal best

=== Heats ===
The first round was held on August 25.

Rank	Name	Nationality	Time	Notes
1	Michael Klim	Australia	49.39	Q
2	Neil Walker	United States	49.97	Q
3	Chris Fydler	Australia	50.08	Q
4	Jason Lezak	United States	50.10	Q
5	Ian Thorpe	Australia	50.11	Q
6	Brock Newman	United States	50.14	Q
7	Jeffrey English	Australia	50.21	Q
8	Bryan Jones	United States	50.24	Q
9	Yannick Lupien	Canada	50.54	Q
10	Todd Pearson	Australia	50.57	
11	Dod Wales	United States	50.61	
12	Raymond Hass	Australia	50.62	
13	Jay Schryver	United States	50.82	
14	Shunsuke Ito	Japan	50.86	Q
15	Brad Schumacher	United States	50.95	
16	Joseph Marus	United States	50.98	
17	Salim Iles	Algeria	51.17	Q
18	Nicholas Folker	South Africa	51.22	Q
19	Ian Crocker	United States	51.23	
20	Geoff Huegill	Australia	51.51	
21	Nathan Rickard	Australia	51.52	
22	Craig Hutchison	Canada	51.54	Q
23	Mike Mintenko	Canada	51.65	Q
24	Graham Duthie	Canada	51.93	Q
25	Greg Main-Baillie	South Africa	51.97	Q
26	Jake Steele	Canada	52.03	
27	Tomohiro Yamanoi	Japan	52.11	
27	Mark Johnston	Canada	52.11	
29	Nicholas Sheeran	New Zealand	52.21	
30	Rick Say	Canada	52.37	
30	Brad Herring	New Zealand	52.37	
32	Brian Johns	Canada	52.43	
33	Scott Rice	New Zealand	52.63	
34	Carl Probert	Fiji	52.99	
35	Adam Sioui	Canada	53.20	
36	Ryo Takayasu	Japan	53.39	
37	Wing Fu	Hong Kong	53.46	
38	Gentle Offoin	Nigeria	53.71	
39	Mark Thompson	New Zealand	53.73	
40	Colin Sood	Canada	53.86	

=== Semifinals ===
The semifinals were held on August 25.

Rank	Name	Nationality	Time	Notes
1	Michael Klim	Australia	48.81	Q, CR
2	Chris Fydler	Australia	49.62	Q
3	Neil Walker	United States	49.70	Q
4	Ian Thorpe	Australia	49.71	
5	Brock Newman	United States	49.94	Q
6	Jason Lezak	United States	50.11	
7	Bryan Jones	United States	50.23	
8	Jeffrey English	Australia	50.40	
9	Yannick Lupien	Canada	50.47	Q
10	Nicholas Folker	South Africa	50.72	Q
11	Shunsuke Ito	Japan	50.90	Q
12	Salim Iles	Algeria	51.47	Q
13	Mike Mintenko	Canada	51.69	
14	Graham Duthie	Canada	51.75	
15	Greg Main-Baillie	South Africa	51.76	
16	Craig Hutchison	Canada	51.87	

=== Final ===
The final was held on August 26.

Rank	Lane	Nationality	Time	Notes
1st place, gold medalist(s)	Michael Klim	Australia	48.98	
2nd place, silver medalist(s)	Neil Walker	United States	49.17	
3rd place, bronze medalist(s)	Chris Fydler	Australia	49.42	
4	Yannick Lupien	Canada	49.94	NR
5	Nicholas Folker	South Africa	50.36	
6	Salim Iles	Algeria	51.09	
7	Shunsuke Ito	Japan	51.30	
8	Brock Newman	United States	51.85	
