= Swimming at the 1996 Summer Olympics – Men's 4 × 100 metre freestyle relay =

Men's 4 × 100 metre freestyle relay at the Games of the XXVI Olympiad
- Venue: Georgia Tech Aquatic Center
- Date: 23 July 1996 (heats & final)
- Competitors: 83 from 19 nations
- Teams: 19
- Winning time: 3:15.41 OR

Medalists
| 1st place, gold medalist(s) | | Jon Olsen, Josh Davis, Brad Schumacher, Gary Hall, Jr., David Fox*, Scott Tucker* | United States |
| 2nd place, silver medalist(s) | | Roman Yegorov, Alexander Popov, Vladimir Predkin, Vladimir Pyshnenko, Denis Pimankov*, Konstantin Ushkov* | Russia |
| 3rd place, bronze medalist(s) | | Christian Tröger, Bengt Zikarsky, Björn Zikarsky, Mark Pinger, Alexander Lüderitz*; *Indicates the swimmer only competed in the preliminary heats. | Germany |

The men's 4 × 100 metre freestyle relay event at the 1996 Summer Olympics took place on 23 July at the Georgia Tech Aquatic Center in Atlanta, United States.

== Records ==
Prior to this competition, the existing world and Olympic records were as follows.

| World record | United States (USA); David Fox (49.32); Joe Hudepohl (49.11); Jon Olsen (48.17); Gary Hall, Jr. (48.51) | 3:15.11 | Atlanta, United States | 12 August 1995 |
| Olympic record | United States; Chris Jacobs (49.63); Troy Dalbey (49.75); Tom Jager (49.34); Matt Biondi (47.81) | 3:16.53 | Seoul, South Korea | 23 September 1988 |

The following new world and Olympic records were set during this competition.

| Date | Event | Name | Nationality | Time | Record |
|---|---|---|---|---|---|
| 23 July | Final | Jon Olsen (49.94); Josh Davis (49.00); Brad Schumacher (49.02); Gary Hall, Jr. (47.45) | United States | 3:15.41 | OR |

== Results ==
=== Heats ===
Rule: The eight fastest teams advance to the final (Q).

| Rank | Heat | Lane | Nation | Swimmers | Time | Notes |
|---|---|---|---|---|---|---|
| 1 | 3 | 4 | United States | David Fox (50.46); Scott Tucker (49.68); Brad Schumacher (49.19); Josh Davis (49.07) | 3:18.40 | Q |
| 2 | 1 | 4 | Germany | Mark Pinger (50.50); Alexander Lüderitz (50.06); Bengt Zikarsky (48.97); Björn Zikarsky (49.74) | 3:19.27 | Q |
| 3 | 2 | 3 | Netherlands | Pie Geelen (50.86); Mark Veens (49.94); Martin van der Spoel (50.72); Pieter van den Hoogenband (48.64) | 3:20.16 | Q, NR |
| 4 | 2 | 5 | Brazil | Fernando Scherer (50.81); Alexandre Massura (50.20); André Cordeiro (50.27); Gustavo Borges (48.93) | 3:20.21 | Q, SA |
| 5 | 3 | 5 | Russia | Roman Yegorov (50.82); Denis Pimankov (50.09); Konstantin Ushkov (50.32); Vladimir Pyshnenko (49.16) | 3:20.39 | Q |
| 6 | 1 | 5 | Sweden | Fredrik Letzler (50.81); Lars Frölander (49.34); Christer Wallin (50.13); Johan Wallberg (50.46) | 3:20.74 | Q |
| 7 | 2 | 4 | Australia | Michael Klim (50.09); Ian Vander-Wal (50.70); Scott Logan (50.38); Chris Fydler (49.71) | 3:20.88 | Q |
| 8 | 1 | 3 | Great Britain | Nicholas Shackell (50.44); Alan Rapley (50.18); Mark Stevens (49.97); Mike Fibbens (50.75) | 3:21.34 | Q |
| 9 | 3 | 3 | New Zealand | John Steel (50.60); Nicholas Tongue (50.89); Danyon Loader (51.02); Trent Bray (49.14) | 3:21.65 | |
| 10 | 2 | 6 | Romania | Nicolae Ivan (51.06); Răzvan Petcu (50.88); Horaţiu Badiţă (50.31); Alexandru Ioanovici (49.41) | 3:21.66 | NR |
| 11 | 3 | 6 | France | Ludovic Dépickère (51.22); Nicolas Gruson (49.61); Peirrick Chavatte (50.15); Frédéric Lefevre (50.81) | 3:21.79 | |
| 12 | 2 | 2 | Finland | Jani Sievinen (50.04); Antti Kasvio (50.42); Janne Blomqvist (51.52); Kalle Varonen (51.01) | 3:22.99 | |
| 13 | 3 | 2 | Venezuela | Diego Henao (51.64); Carlos Santander (51.01); Alejandro Carrizo (51.20); Francisco Sánchez (49.19) | 3:23.04 | |
| 14 | 1 | 6 | Croatia | Miroslav Vučetić (51.10); Miloš Milošević (50.81); Alen Lončar (52.38); Marijan Kanjer (51.73) | 3:26.02 | |
| 15 | 2 | 7 | Ecuador | Julio Santos (51.48); Felipe Delgado (50.59); Roberto Delgado (53.22); Javier Santos (52.48) | 3:27.77 | |
| 16 | 1 | 7 | Puerto Rico | Eduardo González (52.37); José González (51.69); Arsenio López (52.55); Ricardo Busquets (51.66) | 3:28.27 | |
| 17 | 3 | 7 | Uzbekistan | Ravil Nachaev (52.46); Oleg Tsvetkovskiy (52.13); Oleg Pukhnatiy (51.82); Vyacheslav Kabanov (51.92) | 3:28.33 | |
| 18 | 3 | 1 | Kyrgyzstan | Sergey Ashihmin (50.85) NR; Andrey Kvassov (52.08); Dmitry Lapin (53.67); Vitaly Vasilyev (54.02) | 3:30.62 | |
| | 1 | 2 | Kazakhstan | Aleksey Yegorov (50.86); Sergey Ushkalov (52.18); Sergey Borisenko (50.61); Aleksey Khovrin (51.49) | DSQ | |

=== Final ===
| Rank | Lane | Nation | Swimmers | Time | Notes |
|---|---|---|---|---|---|
| 1st place, gold medalist(s) | 4 | United States | Jon Olsen (49.94); Josh Davis (49.00); Brad Schumacher (49.02); Gary Hall, Jr. (47.45) | 3:15.41 | OR |
| 2nd place, silver medalist(s) | 2 | Russia | Roman Yegorov (49.95); Alexander Popov (47.88); Vladimir Predkin (49.51); Vladimir Pyshnenko (49.72) | 3:17.06 | ER |
| 3rd place, bronze medalist(s) | 5 | Germany | Christian Tröger (49.74); Bengt Zikarsky (49.01); Björn Zikarsky (48.81); Mark Pinger (49.64) | 3:17.20 | |
| 4 | 6 | Brazil | Fernando Scherer (49.69); Alexandre Massura (50.24); André Cordeiro (50.38); Gustavo Borges (47.99) | 3:18.30 | SA |
| 5 | 3 | Netherlands | Mark Veens (50.66); Pie Geelen (50.09); Martin van der Spoel (49.98); Pieter van den Hoogenband (48.29) | 3:19.02 | NR |
| 6 | 1 | Australia | Michael Klim (49.87); Matthew Dunn (50.50); Scott Logan (49.97); Chris Fydler (49.79) | 3:20.13 | |
| 7 | 7 | Sweden | Lars Frölander (50.01); Fredrik Letzler (50.13); Anders Holmertz (50.06); Christer Wallin (49.96) | 3:20.16 | |
| 8 | 8 | Great Britain | Nicholas Shackell (50.50); Alan Rapley (49.76); Mark Stevens (50.50); Mike Fibbens (50.76) | 3:21.52 | |
