= Swimming at the 2000 Summer Olympics – Men's 4 × 100 metre freestyle relay =

Men's 4 × 100 metre freestyle relay at the Games of the XXVII Olympiad
- Venue: Sydney International Aquatic Centre
- Dates: September 16, 2000 (heats & final)
- Competitors: 100 from 23 nations
- Winning time: 3:13.67 WR

Medalists
1st place, gold medalist(s)		Michael Klim, Chris Fydler, Ashley Callus, Ian Thorpe, Todd Pearson*, Adam Pine*	Australia
2nd place, silver medalist(s)		Anthony Ervin, Neil Walker, Jason Lezak, Gary Hall Jr., Scott Tucker*, Josh Davis*	United States
3rd place, bronze medalist(s)		Fernando Scherer, Gustavo Borges, Carlos Jayme, Edvaldo Silva Filho; *Indicates the swimmer only competed in the preliminary heats.	Brazil

The men's 4 × 100 metre freestyle relay event at the 2000 Summer Olympics took place on 16 September at the Sydney International Aquatic Centre in Sydney, Australia.

For the first time in 36 years, the Australians solidified their triumph in front of a raucous home crowd as they upset the undefeated Americans to capture an Olympic title in the event. Leading by 0.25 seconds at the final relay exchange, Ian Thorpe was passed by U.S. swimmer Gary Hall Jr. at the 350 metres mark, but eventually recovered and touched the wall first with an anchor of 48.30 to deliver the Aussie foursome of Michael Klim (48.18), Chris Fydler (48.48), and Ashley Callus (48.74) a gold-medal time in 3:13.67. Leading off the race, Klim also established a global standard to shave 0.03 seconds off the record set by his Russian training partner Alexander Popov in 1994.

Prior to the 4 × 100 m freestyle relay, Hall posted on his blog: "My biased opinion says that we will smash them (Australia's 4x100m team) like guitars. Historically the U.S. has always risen to the occasion. But the logic in that remote area of my brain says it won't be so easy for the United States to dominate the waters this time." The Australian team responded to Hall's remarks after the race by playing air guitar on the pool deck. Hall recalled the race, saying, "I don't even know how to play the guitar...I consider it the best relay race I've ever been part of. I doff my cap to the great Ian Thorpe. He had a better finish than I had." Another member of Australia's victorious 4x100 team, Michael Klim, recalled that "Hall was the first swimmer to come over and congratulate us. Even though he dished it out, he was a true sportsman".

Team USA's Hall (48.24), Anthony Ervin (48.89), Neil Walker (48.31), and Jason Lezak (48.42) lost a powerful challenge to the Aussies only for the silver in a new American record of 3:13.86, the second-fastest time in history, finishing 1.25 seconds under their five-year-old world record. Meanwhile, Brazil's team of Fernando Scherer (49.79), Gustavo Borges (48.61), Carlos Jayme (49.88), Edvaldo Silva Filho (49.12) earned their first ever relay medal in 20 years, as they took home the bronze with a time of 3:17.40.

Germany (3;17.77), Italy (3:17.85), Sweden (3:19.60), and France (3:21.00) rounded out the championship field, while the Russians, led by Popov, were disqualified due to an early relay launch from Andrey Kapralov on the lead-off leg.

In the absence of Pieter van den Hoogenband on the morning prelims, the Dutch team posted an excellent time of 3:18.32 to lead the first heat, but was cast out of the final race for an early jumping attempt from Dennis Rijnbeek during the second exchange.

== Records ==
Prior to this competition, the existing world and Olympic records were as follows.

World record	United States (USA); David Fox (49.32); Joe Hudepohl (49.11); Jon Olsen (48.17); Gary Hall Jr. (47.45)	3:15.11	Atlanta, United States	12 August 1995
Olympic record	United States; Jon Olsen (49.94); Josh Davis (49.00); Brad Schumacher (49.02); Gary Hall Jr. (47.45)	3:15.41	Atlanta, United States	23 July 1996

The following new world and Olympic records were set during this competition.

Date	Event	Name	Nationality	Time	Record
September 16	Final	Michael Klim (48.18) WR; Chris Fydler (48.48); Ashley Callus (48.71); Ian Thorpe (48.30)	Australia	3:13.67	WR

== Results ==
=== Heats ===
Rank	Heat	Lane	Nation	Swimmers	Time	Notes
1	3	4	United States	Scott Tucker (49.80); Anthony Ervin (48.43); Jason Lezak (48.46); Josh Davis (48.74)	3:15.43	Q
2	2	4	Australia	Chris Fydler (49.72); Todd Pearson (49.32); Adam Pine (49.25); Ashley Callus (49.08)	3:17.37	Q
3	1	5	Germany	Lars Conrad (50.60); Torsten Spanneberg (49.41); Stephan Kunzelmann (49.63); Stefan Herbst (49.06)	3:18.70	Q
4	1	3	Italy	Lorenzo Vismara (49.91); Mauro Gallo (49.92); Klaus Lanzarini (49.60); Simone Cercato (49.43)	3:18.86	Q
5	3	5	Brazil	Fernando Scherer (50.16); Edvaldo Silva Filho (49.26); Carlos Jayme (50.10); Gustavo Borges (49.77)	3:19.29	Q
6	2	5	Russia	Denis Pimankov (49.93); Leonid Khokhlov (51.02); Andrey Kapralov (49.03); Alexander Popov (49.72)	3:19.70	Q
7	2	6	Sweden	Stefan Nystrand (50.42); Johan Wallberg (50.30); Lars Frölander (48.79); Mattias Ohlin (50.29)	3:19.80	Q
8	2	3	France	Romain Barnier (50.05); Frédérick Bousquet (49.41); Hugo Viart (50.35); Nicolas Kintz (50.38)	3:20.19	Q
9	3	3	Great Britain	Paul Belk (50.59); Sion Brinn (49.52); Anthony Howard (50.18); Mark Stevens (50.16)	3:20.45	
10	1	2	Belarus	Igor Koleda (49.95); Pavel Lagoun (49.80); Dzmitry Kalinouski (51.16); Aleh Rukhlevich (49.94)	3:20.85	NR
11	2	2	South Africa	Roland Mark Schoeman (50.19); Brendon Dedekind (50.27); Nicholas Folker (49.57); Terence Parkin (51.25)	3:21.28	AF
12	3	2	Ukraine	Vyacheslav Shyrshov (49.77); Rostyslav Svanidze (51.69); Artem Goncharenko (49.98); Pavlo Khnykin (50.04)	3:21.48	
13	3	6	Canada	Craig Hutchison (50.40); Robbie Taylor (50.89); Rick Say (50.97); Yannick Lupien (49.72)	3:21.98	
14	3	7	Israel	Alexei Manziula (51.14); Eithan Urbach (49.68); Oren Azrad (50.68); Yoav Bruck (50.56)	3:22.06	NR
15	1	6	Spain	Jorge Luis Ulibarri (50.89); Eduardo Lorente (50.52); Juan Benavides (50.67); Javier Botello (50.68)	3:22.76	
16	2	7	Lithuania	Arūnas Savickas (52.11); Minvydas Packevičius (50.53); Saulius Binevičius (50.81); Rolandas Gimbutis (50.23)	3:23.68	
17	2	8	Venezuela	Carlos Santander (51.28); Oswaldo Quevedo (51.36); Francisco Páez (50.97); Francisco Sánchez (51.03)	3:24.64	
18	3	8	Denmark	Dennis Otzen Jensen (51.69); Henrik Steen Andersen (51.45); Jeppe Nielsen (51.18); Jacob Carstensen (50.46)	3:24.78	
19	1	7	Croatia	Duje Draganja (50.45); Marijan Kanjer (51.37); Ivan Mladina (50.91); Alen Lončar (52.23)	3:24.96	
20	2	1	Kyrgyzstan	Sergey Ashihmin (51.65); Konstantin Ushkov (50.04); Dmitri Kuzmin (50.61); Alexei Pavlov (52.73)	3:25.03	NR
21	3	1	Kazakhstan	Igor Sitnikov (52.56); Andrey Kvassov (52.25); Pavel Sidorov (52.14); Sergey Borisenko (51.95)	3:28.90	
	1	1	Netherlands	Mark Veens (49.38); Dennis Rijnbeek; Ewout Holst; Johan Kenkhuis	DSQ	
	1	4	Uzbekistan	Oleg Tsvetkovskiy (52.42); Oleg Pukhnatiy; Ravil Nachaev; Petr Vasiliev	DSQ	

=== Final ===
Rank	Lane	Nation	Swimmers	Time	Time behind	Notes
1st place, gold medalist(s)	5	Australia	Michael Klim (48.18) WR; Chris Fydler (48.48); Ashley Callus (48.71); Ian Thorpe (48.30)	3:13.67		WR
2nd place, silver medalist(s)	4	United States	Anthony Ervin (48.89); Neil Walker (48.31); Jason Lezak (48.42); Gary Hall Jr. (48.24)	3:13.86	0.19	AM
3rd place, bronze medalist(s)	2	Brazil	Fernando Scherer (49.79); Gustavo Borges (48.61); Carlos Jayme (49.88); Edvaldo Silva Filho (49.12)	3:17.40	3.73	
4	3	Germany	Torsten Spanneberg (49.63); Christian Tröger (49.06); Stephan Kunzelmann (50.20); Stefan Herbst (48.88)	3:17.77	4.10	
5	6	Italy	Lorenzo Vismara (49.23); Klaus Lanzarini (49.46); Massimiliano Rosolino (49.70); Simone Cercato (49.46)	3:17.85	4.18	
6	1	Sweden	Stefan Nystrand (50.06); Lars Frölander (48.12); Mattias Ohlin (49.99); Johan Nyström (51.43)	3:19.60	5.93	
7	8	France	Frédérick Bousquet (50.88); Romain Barnier (49.68); Hugo Viart (49.79); Nicolas Kintz (50.65)	3:21.00	7.33	
	7	Russia	Andrey Kapralov (50.44); Denis Pimankov; Alexander Popov; Dmitry Chernyshov	DSQ		
