= 1997 Pan Pacific Swimming Championships – Men's 100 metre butterfly =

Men's 100 metre butterfly at the 1997 Pan Pacific Swimming Championships
- Venue: NISHI Civic Pool
- Dates: August 12, 1997 (heats & finals)
- Competitors: 21 from 10 nations
- Winning time: 52.76

Medalists
gold medal	Neil Walker	United States
silver medal	Michael Klim	Australia
bronze medal	Nate Dusing	United States

The men's 100 metre butterfly competition at the 1997 Pan Pacific Swimming Championships took place on August 12 at the NISHI Civic Pool. The last champion was Scott Miller of Australia.

This race consisted of two lengths of the pool, all in butterfly.

== Records ==
Prior to this competition, the existing world and Pan Pacific records were as follows:

World record	Denis Pankratov (RUS)	52.27	Atlanta, United States	July 24, 1996
Pan Pacific Championships record	Scott Miller (AUS)	53.07	Atlanta, United States	August 12, 1995

== Results ==
All times are in minutes and seconds.

KEY:	q	Fastest non-qualifiers	Q	Qualified	CR	Championships record	NR	National record	PB	Personal best	SB	Seasonal best

=== Heats ===
The first round was held on August 12.

Rank	Name	Nationality	Time	Notes
1	Neil Walker	United States	53.04	QA, CR
2	Michael Klim	Australia	53.12	QA
3	Nate Dusing	United States	53.13	QA
4	Takashi Yamamoto	Japan	53.99	QA
5	John Hargis	United States	54.00	QA
6	Scott Goodman	Australia	54.02	QA
7	Ricardo Busquets	Puerto Rico	54.05	QA
8	Stephen Clarke	Canada	54.36	QA
9	Edward Parenti	Canada	54.48	QB
10	Theo Verster	South Africa	54.53	QB
11	Junya Kawakami	Japan	54.64	QB
12	Yukihiro Matsushita	Japan	55.15	QB
13	Steven Brown	United States	55.45	QB
14	Casey Barrett	Canada	55.97	QB
15	Sergio Garza	Mexico	56.08	QB
16	Jiang Chengji	China	56.15	QB
17	Nicholas Sheeran	New Zealand	56.21	
18	Ravil Nachaev	Uzbekistan	56.30	
19	Hisayoshi Tanaka	Japan	56.31	
20	John Steel	New Zealand	56.50	
21	Philip Weiss	Canada	56.82	

=== B Final ===
The B final was held on August 12.

Rank	Name	Nationality	Time	Notes
9	John Hargis	United States	54.50	
10	Junya Kawakami	Japan	54.82	
11	Yukihiro Matsushita	Japan	55.47	
12	John Steel	New Zealand	55.64	
13	Sergio Garza	Mexico	56.11	
14	Casey Barrett	Canada	56.19	
15	Nicholas Sheeran	New Zealand	57.08	
-	Ravil Nachaev	Uzbekistan	DNS	

=== A Final ===
The A final was held on August 12.

Rank	Lane	Nationality	Time	Notes
1st place, gold medalist(s)	Neil Walker	United States	52.76	CR
2nd place, silver medalist(s)	Michael Klim	Australia	52.94	
3rd place, bronze medalist(s)	Nate Dusing	United States	53.26	
4	Takashi Yamamoto	Japan	53.56	
5	Scott Goodman	Australia	54.18	
6	Edward Parenti	Canada	54.19	
7	Stephen Clarke	Canada	54.54	
8	Theo Verster	South Africa	54.58	
