= Shunsuke Ito (disambiguation) =

Shunsuke Ito may refer to:

- Shunsuke Ito (伊藤 俊介, born 1976), Japanese male freestyle swimmer
- Shunsuke Ito (伊藤 俊介, born 1989), Japanese comedian. His younger sister is the actress Sairi Ito.
- Itō Hirobumi (1841 – 1909), briefly during his youth as Itō Shunsuke (伊藤 俊輔), Japanese politician and statesman
- Shunsuke Sakuya (born 1965), birth name Shunsuke Ito (伊藤 俊介), Japanese actor and voice actor
