= Swimming at the 1996 Summer Olympics =

Swimming at the Games of the XXVI Olympiad
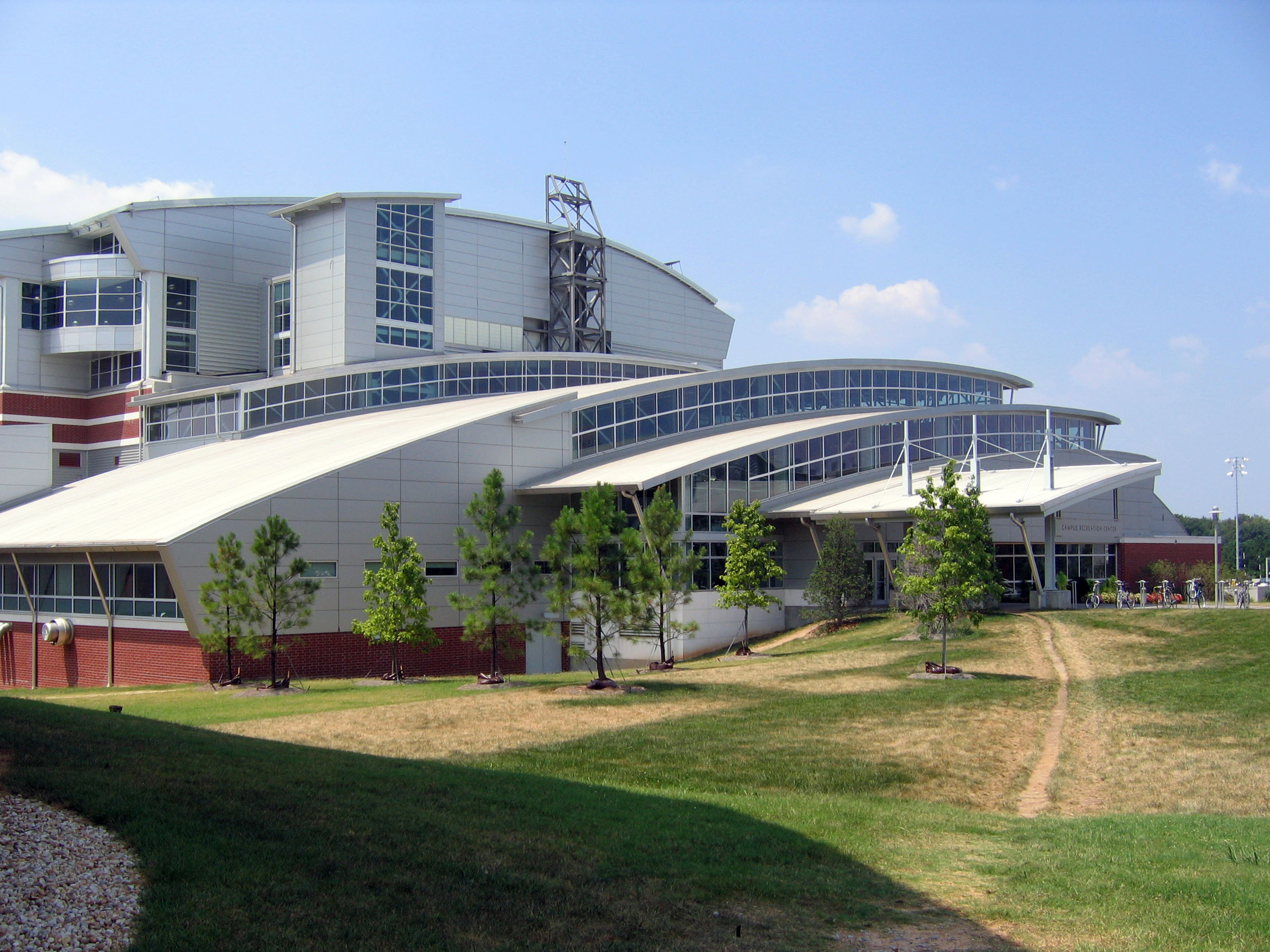
- The front of Georgia Tech's Campus Recreation Center
- Venue: Georgia Tech Aquatic Center
- Dates: July 20 –26, 1996
- No. of events: 32
- Competitors: 762 from 117 nations

The swimming competition at the 1996 Summer Olympics was held at the Georgia Tech Aquatic Center in Atlanta, United States. There were 762 competitors from 117 countries. This was the last Olympics where swimming B-finals were held.

At the time of the games, the facility had a temporary 50 m warm-up pool located behind the locker rooms and entry concourse (on the ground); as well as a temporary roof, and open walls (there were wall-like structures/curtains at the diving well and turning end of the pool). The open walls allowed for temporary seating to be in place during the games. A wall and new roof have since been placed on the facility.

A total of 4 world records and 13 Olympic records were set during the competition

The women's 4 × 200 metre freestyle relay made its debut at these Games.

== Medal table ==
Rank	Nation	Gold	Silver	Bronze	Total
1	United States	13	11	2	26
2	Russia	4	2	2	8
3	Hungary	3	1	2	6
4	Ireland	3	0	1	4
5	Australia	2	4	6	12
6	South Africa	2	0	1	3
7	New Zealand	2	0	0	2
8	China	1	3	2	6
9	Belgium	1	0	0	1
9	Costa Rica	1	0	0	1
11	Germany	0	5	7	12
12	Brazil	0	1	2	3
12	Canada	0	1	2	3
14	Cuba	0	1	1	2
14	Great Britain	0	1	1	2
16	Finland	0	1	0	1
16	Sweden	0	1	0	1
18	Netherlands	0	0	2	2
19	Italy	0	0	1	1
Totals (19 entries)		32	32	32	96

== Medal summary ==
=== Men's events ===
Games	Gold		Silver		Bronze	
50 m freestyle	Aleksandr Popov; Russia	22.13	Gary Hall, Jr. United States	22.26	Fernando Scherer; Brazil	22.29 SA
100 m freestyle	Aleksandr Popov; Russia	48.74	Gary Hall, Jr. United States	48.81	Gustavo Borges; Brazil	49.02
200 m freestyle	Danyon Loader; New Zealand	1:47.63 NR	Gustavo Borges; Brazil	1:48.08 SA	Daniel Kowalski; Australia	1:48.25
400 m freestyle	Danyon Loader; New Zealand	3:47.97 NR	Paul Palmer; Great Britain	3:49.00	Daniel Kowalski; Australia	3:49.39
1500 m freestyle	Kieren Perkins; Australia	14:56.40	Daniel Kowalski; Australia	15:02.43	Graeme Smith; Great Britain	15:02.48 NR
100 m backstroke	Jeff Rouse; United States	54.10	Rodolfo Falcón; Cuba	54.98	Neisser Bent; Cuba	55.02
200 m backstroke	Brad Bridgewater; United States	1:58.54	Tripp Schwenk; United States	1:58.99	Emanuele Merisi; Italy	1:59.18
100 m breaststroke	Fred Deburghgraeve; Belgium	1:00.65	Jeremy Linn; United States	1:00.77 AM	Mark Warnecke; Germany	1:01.33 NR
200 m breaststroke	Norbert Rózsa; Hungary	2:12.57	Károly Güttler; Hungary	2:13.03	Andrey Korneyev; Russia	2:13.17
100 m butterfly	Denis Pankratov; Russia	52.27 WR	Scott Miller; Australia	52.53 OC	Vladislav Kulikov; Russia	53.13
200 m butterfly	Denis Pankratov; Russia	1:56.51	Tom Malchow; United States	1:57.44	Scott Goodman; Australia	1:57.48
200 m medley	Attila Czene; Hungary	1:59.91 OR	Jani Sievinen; Finland	2:00.13	Curtis Myden; Canada	2:01.13 NR
400 m medley	Tom Dolan; United States	4:14.90	Eric Namesnik; United States	4:15.25	Curtis Myden; Canada	4:16.28 NR
4 × 100 m freestyle relay	United States; Jon Olsen; Josh Davis; Brad Schumacher; Gary Hall, Jr. David Fox*; Scott Tucker*	3:15.41 OR	Russia; Roman Yegorov; Aleksandr Popov; Vladimir Predkin; Vladimir Pyshnenko; Denis Pimankov*	3:17.06 ER	Germany; Christian Tröger; Bengt Zikarsky; Björn Zikarsky; Mark Pinger; Alexander Lüderitz*	3:17.20
4 × 200 m freestyle relay	United States; Josh Davis; Joe Hudepohl; Brad Schumacher; Ryan Berube; Jon Olsen*	7:14.84	Sweden; Christer Wallin; Anders Holmertz; Lars Frölander; Anders Lyrbring	7:17.56	Germany; Aimo Heilmann; Christian Keller; Christian Tröger; Steffen Zesner; Konstantin Dubrovin*; Oliver Lampe*	7:17.71
4 × 100 m medley relay	United States; Jeff Rouse; Jeremy Linn; Mark Henderson; Gary Hall, Jr. Josh Davis*; Kurt Grote*; John Hargis*; Tripp Schwenk*	3:34.84 WR	Russia; Vladimir Selkov; Stanislav Lopukhov; Denis Pankratov; Aleksandr Popov; Roman Ivanovsky*; Vladislav Kulikov*; Roman Yegorov*	3:37.55 ER	Australia; Steven Dewick; Phil Rogers; Scott Miller; Michael Klim; Toby Haenen*	3:39.56 OC

* Swimmers who participated in the heats only and received medals.

=== Women's events ===
Games	Gold		Silver		Bronze	
50 m freestyle	Amy Van Dyken; United States	24.87 AM	Le Jingyi; China	24.90	Sandra Völker; Germany	25.14
100 m freestyle	Le Jingyi; China	54.50 OR	Sandra Völker; Germany	54.88	Angel Martino; United States	54.93
200 m freestyle	Claudia Poll; Costa Rica	1:58.16	Franziska van Almsick; Germany	1:58.57	Dagmar Hase; Germany	1:59.56
400 m freestyle	Michelle Smith; Ireland	4:07.25 NR	Dagmar Hase; Germany	4:08.30	Kirsten Vlieghuis; Netherlands	4:08.70 NR
800 m freestyle	Brooke Bennett; United States	8:27.89	Dagmar Hase; Germany	8:29.91	Kirsten Vlieghuis; Netherlands	8:30.84 NR
100 m backstroke	Beth Botsford; United States	1:01.19	Whitney Hedgepeth; United States	1:01.47	Marianne Kriel; South Africa	1:02.12 AF
200 m backstroke	Krisztina Egerszegi; Hungary	2:07.83	Whitney Hedgepeth; United States	2:11.98	Cathleen Rund; Germany	2:12.06
100 m breaststroke	Penelope Heyns; South Africa	1:07.73	Amanda Beard; United States	1:08.09 AM	Samantha Riley; Australia	1:09.18
200 m breaststroke	Penelope Heyns; South Africa	2:25.41 OR	Amanda Beard; United States	2:25.75	Ágnes Kovács; Hungary	2:26.57
100 m butterfly	Amy Van Dyken; United States	59.13	Liu Limin; China	59.14	Angel Martino; United States	59.23
200 m butterfly	Susie O'Neill; Australia	2:07.76	Petria Thomas; Australia	2:09.82	Michelle Smith; Ireland	2:09.91 NR
200 m individual medley	Michelle Smith; Ireland	2:13.93 NR	Marianne Limpert; Canada	2:14.35 NR	Lin Li; China	2:14.74
400 m individual medley	Michelle Smith; Ireland	4:39.18 NR	Allison Wagner; United States	4:42.03	Krisztina Egerszegi; Hungary	4:42.53
4 × 100 m freestyle relay	United States; Angel Martino; Amy Van Dyken; Catherine Fox; Jenny Thompson; Lisa Jacob*; Melanie Valerio*	3:39.29 OR	China; Le Jingyi; Chao Na; Nian Yun; Shan Ying	3:40.48	Germany; Sandra Völker; Simone Osygus; Antje Buschschulte; Franziska van Almsick; Meike Freitag*	3:41.48
4 × 200 m freestyle relay	United States; Trina Jackson; Cristina Teuscher; Sheila Taormina; Jenny Thompson; Lisa Jacob*; Annette Salmeen*; Ashley Whitney*	7:59.87 OR, AM	Germany; Franziska van Almsick; Kerstin Kielgass; Anke Scholz; Dagmar Hase; Meike Freitag*; Simone Osygus*	8:01.55	Australia; Julia Greville; Nicole Stevenson; Emma Johnson; Susie O'Neill; Lise Mackie*	8:05.47
4 × 100 m medley relay	United States; Beth Botsford; Amanda Beard; Angel Martino; Amy Van Dyken; Catherine Fox*; Whitney Hedgepeth*; Kristine Quance*; Jenny Thompson*	4:02.88	Australia; Nicole Stevenson; Samantha Riley; Susie O'Neill; Sarah Ryan; Helen Denman*; Angela Kennedy*	4:05.08	China; Chen Yan; Han Xue; Cai Huijue; Shan Ying	4:07.34

* Swimmers who participated in the heats only and received medals.

== Olympic and world records broken ==
Note: Any world record is also an Olympic record

=== Men ===
Event	Date	Round	Name	Nationality	Time	Record
100 m Breaststroke	20 July	Heat 6	Frédérik Deburghgraeve	Belgium	1:00.60	WR
100 m Butterfly	24 July	Heat 7	Scott Miller	Australia	52.89	OR
100 m Butterfly	24 July	Final A	Denis Pankratov	Russia	52.27	WR
200 m Individual Medley	25 July	Final A	Attila Czene	Hungary	1:59.91	OR
4 × 100 m Freestyle Relay	23 July	Final	Jon Olsen (49.94); Josh Davis (49.00); Brad Schumacher (49.02); Gary Hall, Jr. (47.45)	United States	3:15.41	OR
4 × 100 m Medley Relay	26 July	Final	Jeff Rouse (53.95); Jeremy Linn (1:00.32); Mark Henderson (52.39); Gary Hall, Jr. (48.18)	United States	3:34.84	WR

=== Women ===
Event	Date	Round	Name	Nationality	Time	Record
100 m Freestyle	20 July	Final A	Le Jingyi	China	54.50	OR
100 m Breaststroke	21 July	Heat 6	Penny Heyns	South Africa	1:07.02	WR
200 m Breaststroke	23 July	Heat 4	Penny Heyns	South Africa	2:26.63	OR
200 m Breaststroke	23 July	Final A	Penny Heyns	South Africa	2:25.41	OR
4 × 100 m Freestyle Relay	22 July	Final	Angel Martino (55.34); Amy Van Dyken (53.91); Catherine Fox (55.93); Jenny Thompson (54.11)	United States	3:39.29	OR
4 × 200 m Freestyle Relay	25 July	Heat 2	Lisa Jacob (2:01.31); Ashley Whitney (2:01.77); Sheila Taormina (2:00.57); Annette Salmeen (2:01.34)	United States	8:04.99	OR
4 × 200 m Freestyle Relay	25 July	Final	Trina Jackson (1:59.71); Cristina Teuscher (1:58.86); Sheila Taormina (2:01.29); Jenny Thompson (1:56.83)	United States	7:59.87	OR

== Participating nations ==
762 swimmers from 117 nations competed.

- Algeria (1)
- Andorra (2)
- Angola (1)
- Argentina (7)
- Armenia (1)
- Australia (33)
- Austria (4)
- Azerbaijan (1)
- Bahamas (1)
- Barbados (2)
- Bangladesh (1)
- Belgium (4)
- Belarus (10)
- Bolivia (2)
- Bosnia and Herzegovina (2)
- Brazil (10)
- Bulgaria (1)
- Cambodia (2)
- Canada (27)
- Chile (1)
- China (21)
- Chinese Taipei (8)
- Colombia (5)
- Republic of the Congo (2)
- Costa Rica (3)
- Croatia (11)
- Cuba (3)
- Cyprus (2)
- Czech Republic (10)
- Denmark (10)
- Dominica (1)
- Ecuador (5)
- Egypt (2)
- El Salvador (2)
- Estonia (1)
- Fiji (2)
- Finland (12)
- France (25)
- Germany (28)
- Great Britain (28)
- Greece (8)
- Guam (2)
- Guatemala (2)
- Haiti (1)
- Honduras (1)
- Hong Kong (3)
- Hungary (21)
- Iceland (3)
- India (2)
- Indonesia (1)
- Iran (1)
- Ireland (5)
- Israel (4)
- Italy (14)
- Jamaica (1)
- Japan (27)
- Jordan (2)
- Kazakhstan (7)
- Kyrgyzstan (12)
- Kuwait (3)
- Latvia (4)
- Lithuania (8)
- Macedonia (4)
- Madagascar (2)
- Maldives (1)
- Malaysia (5)
- Malta (1)
- Moldova (5)
- Mauritius (2)
- Mexico (2)
- Monaco (1)
- Mozambique (1)
- Namibia (2)
- Nepal (2)
- Netherlands (20)
- Netherlands Antilles (1)
- New Zealand (14)
- Nicaragua (1)
- Norway (5)
- Oman (1)
- Pakistan (1)
- Panama (2)
- Paraguay (2)
- Peru (2)
- Philippines (2)
- Poland (11)
- Portugal (12)
- Puerto Rico (7)
- Romania (14)
- Russia (30)
- San Marino (1)
- FR Yugoslavia (4)
- Seychelles (1)
- Sierra Leone (1)
- Singapore (5)
- Slovenia (5)
- Slovakia (3)
- South Africa (7)
- South Korea (20)
- Spain (18)
- Suriname (4)
- Swaziland (1)
- Sweden (18)
- Switzerland (5)
- Syria (1)
- Thailand (6)
- Trinidad and Tobago (2)
- Turkey (4)
- Ukraine (13)
- United States (44)
- Virgin Islands (1)
- United Arab Emirates (1)
- Uruguay (2)
- Uzbekistan (6)
- Venezuela (7)
- Vietnam (2)
- Zimbabwe (1)
