= Horațiu Badiță =

Romanian swimmer

Personal information
- Born: 8 August 1976
- Died: 11 June 2014 (aged 37)

Sport
- Sport: Swimming

Horațiu Badiță (8 August 1976 – 11 June 2014) was a Romanian swimmer. He competed in the men's 4 × 100 metre freestyle relay event at the 1996 Summer Olympics. He died of a brain tumor.
