= Alan Rapley =

British swimmer

Personal information
- Born: 20 April 1970 (age 56) Epping, England

Sport
- Sport: Swimming

Alan Rapley (born 20 April 1970) is a British swimmer. He competed in the men's 4 × 100 metre freestyle relay event at the 1996 Summer Olympics.
