= Eduardo González (swimmer) =

Puerto Rican swimmer (born 1974)

Personal information
- Born: 17 February 1974 (age 52)

Sport
- Sport: Swimming

Eduardo González (born 17 February 1974) is a Puerto Rican swimmer. He competed in the men's 4 × 100 metre freestyle relay event at the 1996 Summer Olympics.
