= Kristine Quance =

American swimmer (born 1975)

Personal information
- Full name: Kristine Lora Quance
- National team: United States
- Born: April 1, 1975 (age 51) Northridge, California, U.S.
- Height: 5 ft 8 in (1.73 m)
- Weight: 141 lb (64 kg)

Sport
- Sport: Swimming
- Strokes: Breaststroke, medley
- Club: CLASS Aquatics; Trojan Swim Club
- College team: University of Southern California
- Coach: Mark Schubert (USC)
Medal record
Women's swimming
Representing the United States
Olympic Games
| Gold medal – first place | 1996 Atlanta | 4×100 m medley |
World Championships (LC)
| Silver medal – second place | 1994 Rome | 4×100 m medley |
| Bronze medal – third place | 1994 Rome | 400 m medley |
Pan Pacific Games
| Gold medal – first place | 1991 Edmonton | 200 m breaststroke |
| Gold medal – first place | 1993 Kobe | 400 m medley |
| Gold medal – first place | 1997 Fukuoka | 200 m medley |
| Gold medal – first place | 1997 Fukuoka | 400 m medley |
| Silver medal – second place | 1991 Edmonton | 400 m medley |
| Silver medal – second place | 1997 Fukuoka | 200 m butterfly |
| Bronze medal – third place | 1993 Kobe | 200 m breaststroke |

Kristine Lora Quance (born April 1, 1975), also known by her married name Kristine Julian, is an American former competition swimmer who specialized in breaststroke and medley events. Quance competed at the international level in the 1990s, and swam at the 1996 Summer Olympics in Atlanta, Georgia, winning a gold medal in the 4×100-meter medley relay. She is a 10-time United States national champion; and twice won the Kiphuth Award as the highest individual point scorer at an individual national championship. In the 1992 Summer National Championships, she won all four of the events in which she swam.

== 1991-1993 Pan Pacific medals ==
While training with Bud McAlister at CLASS Aquatics in her hometown of Northridge, Quance was selected to make her international debut at the 1991 Pan Pacific Swimming Championships in Edmonton, Canada, where she won gold and silver in the 200-meter breaststroke and 400-meter individual medley respectively.

The following year was a disappointment for Quance, as she missed selection for the 1992 Summer Olympics in Barcelona, Spain. She made a strong comeback at the 1993 Pan Pacs in Kobe, Japan, winning gold and bronze in the 400-meter individual medley and 200-meter breaststroke respectively.

== 1994 World Aquatics Championships ==
She won her first medal at the global level in 1994. At the 1994 World Aquatics Championships in Rome, Italy, she took a silver in the 4x100 meter medley relay, a bronze in the 400-meter individual medley and finished sixth in the 200-meter breaststroke.

== 1996 Atlanta Olympics ==
=== Olympic trials ===
1996 proved a critical year for Quance. At the 1996 US Olympic Trials in March, she did not make qualifying times in her two best events, the 200 breaststroke and 400-meter individual medley. She did, however qualify for the 1996 Olympics in the 100-meter breaststroke and 200-meter individual medley.

=== 4 x 100 medley relay gold ===
Fulfilling one of her greatest ambitions at the 1996 Olympic Games in Atlanta, she was able to collect a gold medal in the 4×100-meter medley relay by swimming the breaststroke leg in the preliminary heats, though Amanda Beard swam in the final, replacing her. Kristine swam a 1:10.40 for her leg of the preliminary event in Heat 2, which helped the team advance to the semi-finals. Her time for the breaststroke leg was just a little over two seconds behind Amanda Beard's gold medal winning time in the first-place gold medal winning Olympic final. Facing stiff global competition in individual events, Kristine finished 9th and 19th respectively in the 200-meter individual medley and 100-meter breaststroke.

== 1997 Pan Pacifics gold medals ==
Showing resolve, Quance bounced back again at the 1997 Pan Pacific Championships in Fukuoka, Japan, winning the 200-meter and 400-meter individual medley events, finishing second in the 200-meter butterfly and fourth in the 200-meter breaststroke.

== 1998 World Aquatics Championships ==
The 1998 World Championships in Perth, Australia marked her last international appearance. There she made the finals in the 200-meter butterfly and 200-meter individual medley. She also became the fifth American woman to qualify for four individual events on a World Championship team. Previously this had been done by Janet Evans (1991), Cynthia Woodhead (1978), Tracy Caulkins (1978), and Shirley Babashoff (1975).

== Honours ==
She was a two-time recipient of the Honda Sports Award for Swimming and Diving, recognizing her as the outstanding college female swimmer of the year in 1995–96 and again in 1996–97. She also received Swimmer of the Year honors at the 1996 NCAA Women's Division I Swimming & Diving Championships.

Her 1997 Pan Pacific medal performances earned her the American Swimmer of the Year award from Swimming World Magazine.

== Coaching ==
She now coaches at the senior level at the Mission Viejo Nadadores with her husband, Jeff Julian, who was also a former world-class swimmer. They have a son, Trenton Julian, who also swam at the Mission Viejo Nadadores.

== See also ==
- List of Olympic medalists in swimming (women)
- List of World Aquatics Championships medalists in swimming (women)

Awards
| Preceded by Amy Van Dyken | Swimming World; American Swimmer of the Year; 1997 | Succeeded by Jenny Thompson |
