= Neil Walker (swimmer) =

American swimmer (born 1976)

Personal information
- Full name: Neil Scott Walker
- National team: United States
- Born: June 25, 1976 (age 50) Verona, Wisconsin, U.S.
- Occupation: Swim coach
- Height: 6 ft 5 in (1.96 m)
- Weight: 198 lb (90 kg)
- Spouse: April

Sport
- Sport: Swimming
- Strokes: Backstroke, butterfly, individual medley
- Club: Verona Aquatic Club; Longhorn Aquatics
- College team: University of Texas
- Coach: Randy Trowbridge (Verona Aquatics); Eddie Reese (Texas)
Medal record
Men's swimming
Representing the United States
Olympic Games
Gold medal – first place	2000 Sydney	4×100 m medley
Gold medal – first place	2004 Athens	4×100 m medley
Silver medal – second place	2000 Sydney	4×100 m freestyle
Bronze medal – third place	2004 Athens	4×100 m freestyle
World Championships (LC)
Gold medal – first place	1998 Perth	4×100 m freestyle
Gold medal – first place	2005 Montreal	4×100 m freestyle
Gold medal – first place	2005 Montreal	4×100 m medley
Gold medal – first place	2007 Melbourne	4×100 m freestyle
Silver medal – second place	1998 Perth	4×100 m medley
Silver medal – second place	2003 Barcelona	4×100 m freestyle
World Championships (SC)
Gold medal – first place	2000 Athens	50 m backstroke
Gold medal – first place	2000 Athens	100 m backstroke
Gold medal – first place	2000 Athens	100 m medley
Gold medal – first place	2000 Athens	4×200 m freestyle
Gold medal – first place	2000 Athens	4×100 m medley
Gold medal – first place	2004 Indianapolis	4×100 m freestyle
Silver medal – second place	2000 Athens	50 m butterfly
Silver medal – second place	2000 Athens	4×100 m freestyle
Pan Pacific Championships
Gold medal – first place	1997 Fukuoka	100 m butterfly
Gold medal – first place	1997 Fukuoka	4×100 m freestyle
Gold medal – first place	1997 Fukuoka	4×100 m medley
Gold medal – first place	1999 Sydney	4×100 m medley
Gold medal – first place	2006 Victoria	4×100 m freestyle
Silver medal – second place	1997 Fukuoka	100 m freestyle
Silver medal – second place	1997 Fukuoka	100 m backstroke
Silver medal – second place	1999 Sydney	100 m freestyle
Silver medal – second place	1999 Sydney	4×100 m freestyle

Neil Scott Walker (born June 25, 1976) is an American former competition swimmer for the University of Texas, a four-time Olympic medalist in the 4x100 Medley and Freestyle relays, an Olympic champion, and a former world record-holder in multiple events. After setting records in nearly every stroke, including the individual medley, and capturing a total of ten long and short course gold medals at five World Championships, he has been described as one of the most accomplished multi-stroke athletes in the history of American swimming. After retiring as a competitive swimmer, he became a swim coach in Texas, and as of 2025 coached outside Dallas, Texas at the Rockwall Aquatics Center of Excellence (RACE) in Rockwall, Texas.

== Early life and swimming ==
Walker was born June 25, 1976 to Robert and Barbara Walker in Verona, Wisconsin, ten miles Southwest of Madison. He began swimming competitively around the age of nine, and at the age of ten at the Badger Dolphin January Classic on January 10, 1987, swam the 50 backstroke in a meet record time of 34.91. Walker swam for the Verona Aquatic Club under Coach Randy Trowbridge, and in his High School years, swam for the Verona Area High School, where he attended. Trowbridge coached at Verona Aquatics from 1979 until the club folded in 2013. Walker graduated Verona Area High School in 1994 with a 3.65 grade average. T

Walker's workouts after graduating High School in the summer of 1994 consisted of swim training twice a day at least five days a week, with weight training several days a week, and a 30 minute run twice a week. During his time with the Verona Club, he led the team to the Wisconsin Interscholastic Athletic Association (WIAA) Div 2 team title in 1993, setting a state record in the 200 IM of 1:50.86 and a state record in 1994 of 49.61 in the 100 backstroke. His state records remained in place for decades. In the summer after high school graduation, he was ranked 25th in the world in the 100-meter backstroke.

== University of Texas ==
Walker was offered athletic scholarships to Arizona, Florida, Auburn, Texas, and the University of Southern California. After accepting a scholarship to the University of Texas, beginning in the Fall of 1994 he trained and competed for Hall of Fame Head swim Coach Eddie Reese and Associate Coach Kris Kubik. At Texas, he was the recipient of twenty-five All-American honors and won six Conference Championships in the Big-12. As a statement of the team's dominance, he helped Texas win the 1996 NCAA title. Not surprisingly, he was subsequently named Swimmer of the Year for both the NCAA and the Big 12 Conference.

During his collegiate career, and beyond, Walker was known for setting records in both freestyle and stroke events. He set a school and NCAA record of 19.08 in the 50-yard freestyle, and an American, NCAA, and U. of Texas school record of 44.92 in the 100-yard backstroke. He set an American and Pan Pacific Championship record of 52.76 in the 100-meter butterfly. Walker credited his exceptional coaching at U Texas for his achievements with the butterfly, as he told the press, "they focused on improving the underwater dolphin kick", which he had mastered and used with great success in both the 100-meter backstroke and freestyle events. He considered the dolphin kick, "a whole-body technique where you can carry your momentum off the walls and at the start a whole lot easier and faster".

== 2000, 2004 Olympics ==
Walker represented the United States at the 2000 Summer Olympics in Sydney, where he won a silver medal in the men's 4×100-meter freestyle relay, and at the 2004 Summer Olympics in Athens, where he also won a bronze in the 4×100-meter freestyle relay.

Most notably, he twice earned a gold medal in the 4×100-meter medley relay, after swimming for the winning U.S. team in the preliminary heats at both the 2000 and 2004 Olympics. In 2000 in Sydney, Walker swam the first position backstroke leg for the U.S. medley relay team in the second preliminary heat that placed second to the German team, and recorded a time of 3:38.59, just nine hundredths of a second behind the German team that won that preliminary heat. Walker's time for his backstroke leg was the fastest of all the backstroke swimmers, and allowed the U.S. team to advance to the finals, where the U.S. team later won the gold medal. With the American team having great depth in the final heat, backstroke specialist Lenny Krayzelburg replaced Walker in the backstroke leg and put the U.S. into an early lead that was extended but never relinquished.

At the 2004 Athens Olympics, showing versatility, Walker swam the freestyle anchor leg in the first preliminary heat, where the U.S. team won with a combined time of 3:35.10, advancing the Americans to the finals. With the American's demonstrating their clear dominance in the final heat, Aaron Peirsol broke his own world record in the opening backstroke leg, with each American swimmer increasing the American team's lead, outpacing the second-place German team by nearly three full seconds.

At the 2000 Short Course World Championships, one of his more notable meets, in Athens, Greece, he set short course world records in the 50-meter backstroke, 100-meter backstroke, and 100-meter individual medley. Walker swam for Team USA from 1997-2007 and Captained the USA National Team from 2005-7.

=== Post-swimming career ===
During his last years as an elite competitive swimmer, Walker coached part-time with Austin's Longhorn Aquatics with exceptional Head Coach Randy Reese as his mentor. After retiring from competitive swimming after the 2008 U.S. Olympic Trials, he was Aquatics Director for the Rockwall Independent School District outside Dallas, and started the Rockwall Swim School with Olympian and former Longhorn teammate Ian Crocker and U.S. National Champion and former Longhorn teammate James Fike, with locations in Austin and Dallas. As of 2025, he was the head coach of Rockwall Aquatics Center of Excellence (RACE) in Rockwall, Texas, having coached swimming for around twenty years.

=== Honors ===
Walker was elected to the Texas Swimming and Diving Hall of Fame in 2013. He was inducted into the University of Texas Hall of Honor in 2009.

== See also ==
- List of Olympic medalists in swimming (men)
- List of University of Texas at Austin alumni
- List of World Aquatics Championships medalists in swimming (men)
- World record progression 50 metres backstroke
- World record progression 100 metres backstroke
- World record progression 100 metres individual medley
- World record progression 4 × 100 metres freestyle relay
- World record progression 4 × 200 metres freestyle relay

Records
Preceded by Matt Welsh; Matt Welsh	Men's 50-meter backstroke world record-holder (short course); November 18, 1999 – January 14, 2000; March 13, 2000 – September 2, 2002	Succeeded by Matt Welsh; Matt Welsh
Preceded by Jani Sievinen	Men's 100-meter individual medley world record-holder (short course); March 18, 2000 – December 15, 2001	Succeeded by Peter Mankoč
Preceded by Lenny Krayzelburg	Men's 100-meter backstroke world record-holder (short course); March 19, 2000 – December 8, 2002	Succeeded by Thomas Rupprath
