= Ivan Usov =

Russian swimmer (born 1977)

Medal record

Men's swimming

Representing Russia

World Championships (LC)
Gold medal – first place	2003 Barcelona	4×100 m freestyle

European Championships (LC)
Silver medal – second place	2004 Madrid	4×100 m freestyle
Silver medal – second place	2006 Budapest	4×100 m freestyle

Ivan Alekseyevich Usov (Russian: Иван Алексеевич Усов, born 7 October 1977 in Krasnoyarsk) is a freestyle swimmer from Russia. He won a gold medal in the 4×100 freestyle relay at the 2003 World Aquatics Championships and silver in the 4×100 freestyle at the 2004 European Championships in Madrid. He represented his native country at the 2004 Summer Olympics in Athens, where he swam in the preliminary heats of the 4 × 100 m freestyle.
