= Ashley Whitney =

American swimmer (born 1979)

Personal information
- Full name: Ashley Ann Whitney
- National team: United States
- Born: August 21, 1979 (age 46) Nashville, Tennessee, U.S.
- Height: 5 ft 7 in (1.70 m)
- Weight: 123 lb (56 kg)

Sport
- Sport: Swimming
- Strokes: Freestyle
- Club: Bolles Sharks
- College team: University of Georgia; University of Florida; University of California, Berkeley
Medal record
Women's swimming
Representing the United States
Olympic Games
Gold medal – first place	1996 Atlanta	4x200 m freestyle
Pan Pacific Championships
Gold medal – first place	1997 Fukuoka	4x200 m freestyle

Ashley Ann Whitney (born August 21, 1979) is an American former competition swimmer who was a freestyle specialist and an Olympic gold medalist.

At the 1996 Summer Olympics in Atlanta, Georgia, Whitney earned a gold medal when she swam for the winning U.S. team in the preliminary heats of the women's 4×200-meter freestyle relay.

She was born in Nashville, Tennessee. For high school, she attended the Bolles School, a private prep school in Jacksonville, Florida, where she swam for coach Gregg Troy's Bolles high school swim team, a program with a reputation for producing future international swimmers and Olympians. She graduated from the Bolles School in 1998.

Whitney initially attended the University of Georgia, where she was a member of coach Jack Bauerle's Georgia Bulldogs swimming and diving team in 1999—Georgia's first NCAA national championship team. She later transferred to the University of California, Berkeley, where she finished her college career swimming for coach Teri McKeever's Cal Bears women's swimming and diving team.

== See also ==
- List of Olympic medalists in swimming (women)
- List of University of California, Berkeley alumni
- List of University of Georgia people
