= Swimming at the 2003 World Aquatics Championships – Men's 4 × 100 metre freestyle relay =

Men's 4×100m Freestyle Relay at the 2003 FINA World Aquatics Championships
- Dates: July 20
- Nations: 30
- Winning time: 3 minutes 14.06 seconds

Medalists
gold medal	Russia
silver medal	USA
bronze medal	France

The Men's 4×100m Freestyle Relay event at the 10th FINA World Aquatics Championships swam on July 20, 2003. Preliminary heats swam in the morning session that day, with the top eight teams advancing to swim again in the Final that evening.

At the start of the event, the existing World (WR) and Championship (CR) records were:

- WR: 3:13.67 swum by Australia on September 16, 2000 in Sydney, Australia
- CR: 3:14.10 swum by Australia on July 22, 2001 in Fukuoka, Japan

== Results ==
=== Final ===
Rank	Nation	Swimmers	Time	Notes
1	Russia	Andrei Kapralov (49.21), Ivan Usov (48.69), Denis Pimankov (48.45), Alexander Popov (47.71)	3:14.06	CR
2	USA	Scott Tucker (49.57), Neil Walker (48.22), Ryan Wochomurka (49.12), Jason Lezak (47.89)	3:14.80	
3	France	Romain Barnier (49.75), Julien Sicot (49.41), Fabien Gilot (49.47), Frederick Bousquet (47.03)	3:15.66	
4	Australia	Ashley Callus (49.19), Todd Pearson (49.05), Adam Pine (49.45), Ian Thorpe (47.98)	3:15.67	
5	Germany	Jens Thiele (50.01), Torsten Spanneberg (48.14), Lars Conrad (49.12), Stefan Herbst (48.71)	3:15.98	
6	Italy	Lorenzo Vismara (49.46), Christian Galenda (49.08), Michele Scarica (49.32), Filippo Magnini (48.13)	3:15.99	
7	Canada	Yannick Lupien (50.16), Riley Janes (49.01), Mike Mintenko (48.78), Brent Hayden (48.88)	3:16.83	
8	South Africa	Darian Townsend (50.37), Roland Schoeman (49.24), Lyndon Ferns (50.26), Ryk Neethling (48.92)	3:18.79	

=== Preliminaries ===
Rank	Heat/Lane	Nation	Swimmers	Time	Notes
1	H2 L7	Russia	Andrei Kapralov, Dmitri Talepov; Ivan Usov, Denis Pimankov	3:16.17	q
2	H4 L4	United States	Randall Bal, Nate Dusing; Ryan Wochomurka, Neil Walker	3:16.98	q
3	H3 L3	France	Romain Barnier, Julien Sicot; Fabien Gilot, Frédérick Bousquet	3:17.51	q
4	H2 L4	Germany	Lars Conrad, Torsten Spanneberg; Jens Thiele, Stefan Herbst	3:17.53	q
5	H2 L5	Italy	Filippo Magnini, Michele Scarica; Klaus Lanzarini, Christian Galenda	3:17.66	q
6	H4 L5	Canada	Yannick Lupien, Mike Mintenko; Riley Janes, Brent Hayden	3:18.51	q
7	H2 L3	South Africa	Darian Townsend, Roland Schoeman; Lyndon Ferns, Ryk Neethling	3:18.73	q
8	H3 L4	Australia	Todd Pearson, Casey Flouch; Antony Matkovich, Adam Pine	3:18.79	q
9	H3 L5	Sweden	Eric la Fleur, Stefan Nystrand; Lars Frölander, Mattias Ohlin	3:19.22	
10	H4 L3	Netherlands	Johan Kenkhuis, Klaas Erik Zwering; Gijs Damen, Ewout Holst	3:19.36	
11	H4 L6	Great Britain	Chris Cozens, Alexander Scotcher; Ross Davenport, Simon Burnett	3:20.46	
12	H3 L2	Brazil	Gustavo Borges, Jader Souza; Fernando Scherer, Carlos Jayme	3:20.49	
13	H2 L1	Ukraine	Vyacheslav Shyrshov, Oleksandr Volynets; Denys Syzonenko, Artem Ivanov	3:21.16	
14	H3 L7	Lithuania	Rolandas Gimbutis, Saulius Binevičius; Paulius Viktoravičius, Vytautas Janušaitis	3:21.81	
15	H2 L6	Croatia	Mario Delač, Duje Draganja; Ivan Mladina, Igor Čerenšek	3:22.42	
16	H3 L6	China	Shaohua Huang, Yu Liu; Hao Jin, Zuo Chen	3:22.95	
17	H4 L2	Switzerland	Philipp Gilgen, Karel Novy; Dominik Meichtry, Christoph Bühler	3:22.97	
18	H4 L1	Greece	Alexandros Tsoltos, Spyridon Bitsakis; Apostolos Tsagkarakis, Dimitros Manganas	3:23.03	
19	H2 L2	South Korea	Min Sung, Min Suk Kim; Yun Ho Koh, Kyu Chul Han	3:24.38	
20	H4 L8	Venezuela	Luis Rojas, Oswaldo Quevedo; Albert Subirats, Raymond Rosal	3:25.92	
21	H2 L8	Estonia	Danil Haustov, Sven Schneider; Ken Tomson, Martin Viilep	3:27.42	
22	H3 L8	Uzbekistan	Ravil Nachaev, Alexander Agafonov; Oleg Pukhnaty, Petr Vasilev	3:29.04	
23	H4 L7	Portugal	Nuno Laurentino, Luis Monteiro; Simão Morgado, Pedro Silva	3:29.09	
24	H3 L1	Slovenia	Peter Mankoč, Blaž Medvešek; Bojan Zdešar, Matjaž Markič	3:29.51	
25	H1 L4	Barbados	Sean Dehere, Terrence Haynes; Cliff Gittens, Martyn Forde	3:35.46	
26	H1 L5	Hong Kong	Shui Ki Szeto, Wing Fu; Kin Lun Doo, Kwok Leung Chung	3:35.82	
27	H1 L7	Nigeria	Afolabi Adeleke-Adedoyin, Musa Bakare; Eric Williams, Gentle Offoin	3:42.78	
28	H1 L2	Seychelles	Bertrand Bristol, Barnsley Albert; Jean Paul Adam, Kenny Roberts	3:46.76	
29	H1 L3	Macau	Wing Cheung Victor Wong, Kuan Fong Lao; Chan Wai Ma, Chi Lon Lei	3:48.65	
-	-	Ivory Coast		DNS	
