= Catherine Fox =

American swimmer (born 1977)

Personal information
- Full name: Catherine Mai-Lan Fox
- National team: United States
- Born: December 15, 1977 (age 48) Detroit, Michigan, U.S.
- Height: 5 ft 4 in (1.63 m)
- Weight: 119 lb (54 kg)
- Children: Judah Hall Fox

Sport
- Sport: Swimming
- Strokes: Backstroke, freestyle
- Club: Kansas City Blazers
- College team: Stanford University
- Coach: Richard Quick; Stanford
Medal record
Women's swimming
Representing the United States
Olympic Games
Gold medal – first place	1996 Atlanta	4×100 m freestyle
Gold medal – first place	1996 Atlanta	4×100 m medley
World Championships (LC)
Gold medal – first place	1998 Perth	4×100 m freestyle
Pan Pacific Championships
Gold medal – first place	1997 Fukuoka	4×100 m freestyle
Bronze medal – third place	1997 Fukuoka	100 m freestyle
Bronze medal – third place	1997 Fukuoka	100 m backstroke
Pan American Games
Gold medal – first place	1995 Mar del Plata	4×200 m freestyle

Catherine Mai-Lan Fox, born December 15, 1977, in Detroit, Michigan, is an American former swimmer who competed for Stanford University, and won two gold medals swimming freestyle at the 1996 Summer Olympics, one in the 4x100 freestyle relay and one in the 4x100 medley relay.

She is of Vietnamese and European descent. Her father, Thomas C. Fox (editor and former publisher of the National Catholic Reporter), worked in Vietnam for International Voluntary Services from 1966 to 1968, where he met Catherine's mother, To Kim Hoa, a social worker in Can Tho who married Fox in South Vietnam on January 16, 1971. The family moved to Detroit to work for the Detroit Free Press in 1972 where Catherine was born, before later moving to Washington D.C. in 1978 to work for the Washington Star. The family moved to Kansas City in 1980. Catherine would become the first U.S. Olympic swimmer of Vietnamese-American heritage.

== Early swimming ==
After moving to Kansas City in 1980 from Washington D.C., Fox grew up in Roeland Park, Kansas, and attended high school at Bishop Miege, graduating in 1996, though she did not swim for the school. She began swimming around the age of 9 with her hometown club, the Roeland Park Stingrays. She swam for the highly competitive Kansas City Blazers swim club, under Head Coach Pete Malone during her High School years, from 1988 to 1996. In High School in July, 1995, at the Region 8 Championships in Fayetteville, Arkansas, she set a record time of 2:04.41 in the 200-meter freestyle, and a record time of 2:21.05 in the individual medley. She set a third record of 57.13 in the 100-meter freestyle, and won the 400 IM and both the 100 and 200 backstroke events, as well as two relay events. In June 1995, she captured the high point award at the Senior Circuit meet in Houston with 123 points. Her 3.5 grade point average, and swimming performance attracted the attention of a variety of college recruiters.

She attended and swam for Stanford University under Hall of Fame Coach Richard Quick, graduating in 2000 while majoring in human biology and studio art. An exceptional women's team, Stanford had captured five NCAA Championships by 1995 with Quick as Head Coach. Fox may have also been attracted to Stanford as she had a sister attending the school. At Stanford, Fox was a 21-time All-American in swimming, a nine-time NCAA champion, and set an American record in the 100-yard backstroke in 1999 with a time of 52.47 seconds. At the 1996 Spring National Championships, Catherine finished sixth in the 50-meter freestyle, third in the 100-meter freestyle, and fourth in the 100-meter backstroke.

== International competition ==
Fox competed at the 1995 Pan American Games and was a member of the gold medal-winning 4×200-meter freestyle relay team. Fox later won a gold medal in the 4×100-meter freestyle relay, and bronze medals in the 100-meter freestyle and 100-meter backstroke, at the 1997 Pan Pacific Swimming Championships in Fukuoka, Japan. In a significant victory, Fox also won a gold medal in the 1998 Perth, Australia World Championships in the 4x100-meter freestyle relay.

=== 96 Olympics ===
At the March, 1996 Olympic trials in Indianapolis, Catherine placed fourth in the 100-meter backstroke, and eighth in the 100 butterfly with a 1:01.90, but more significantly placed fifth in the 100-meter freestyle, which kept her in contention for freestyle relay events, but gave her only alternate status.

In the 1996 Olympic preliminaries in Atlanta on July 22, 1996, swimming the second leg of the 4x100-meter freestyle relay, Fox swam a 55.03, placing her 7th fastest in the world, and earning her a spot in the 4x100-meter finals, despite her original status as an alternate in the event.

At only 18, she made the U.S. Olympic team for the 1996 Summer Olympics in Atlanta as a freestyle swimmer, and was a member of two gold-winning relay teams: the 4×100-meter freestyle where she swam in the final defeating China and Germany with a combined U.S. team time of 3:39.29 and the 4×100-meter medley where she swam freestyle in a preliminary heat.

In the 2000 Olympic trials in August 2000, Catherine tried out for the Women's 100-meter freestyle, but was tenth in the preliminaries with a 56.36, and 15 in the semi-finals with a 56.70, and did not advance to the finals.

=== Honors ===
In 2006, she was named to the Kansas Sports Hall of Fame.

== See also ==
- List of Olympic medalists in swimming (women)
- List of Stanford University people
