= Roman Yegorov =

Russian swimmer

Personal information
- Full name: Roman Nikolayevich Yegorov
- Nationality: Russia
- Born: 25 January 1974 (age 52)
- Height: 1.84 m (6 ft 0 in)
- Weight: 80 kg (176 lb)

Sport
- Sport: Swimming
- Strokes: Freestyle
- Club: CSKN, St. Petersburg
Medal record
Men's swimming
Representing Russia
Olympic Games
Silver medal – second place	1996 Atlanta	4×100 m freestyle
Silver medal – second place	1996 Atlanta	4×100 m medley
World Championships (LC)
Bronze medal – third place	1998 Perth	4×100 m freestyle
World Championships (SC)
Silver medal – second place	1997 Gothenburg	4×100 m medley
European Championships (LC)
Gold medal – first place	1995 Vienna	4×100 m freestyle
Gold medal – first place	1997 Seville	4×100 m freestyle

Roman Nikolayevich Yegorov (Russian: Роман Николаевич Егоров; born 25 January 1974) is a former Russian freestyle swimmer.

Yegorov won several medals as a member of the freestyle relay team (4×100 m and 4×200 m) during the mid-1990s. He competed at the 1996 Summer Olympics for his native country, winning two silver medals in the relay events.
