= Scott Tucker (swimmer) =

American swimmer (born 1976)

Personal information
- Full name: Scott Eric Tucker
- National team: United States
- Born: February 18, 1976 (age 50) Birmingham, Alabama, U.S.
- Height: 6 ft 2 in (1.88 m)
- Weight: 179 lb (81 kg)

Sport
- Sport: Swimming
- Events: 4x100 medley and freestyle relays
- Strokes: Freestyle
- Club: West Florida Lightning Aquatics; Irvine Novaquatics
- College team: Auburn University
- Coach: Mike Stewart (West Florida Lightning); David Marsh (Auburn)
Medal record
Men's swimming
Representing United States
Olympic Games
Gold medal – first place	1996 Atlanta	4×100 m freestyle
Silver medal – second place	2000 Sydney	4×100 m freestyle
World Championships (LC)
Gold medal – first place	1998 Perth	4×100 m freestyle
Silver medal – second place	2003 Barcelona	4×100 m freestyle
World Championships (SC)
Gold medal – first place	2000 Athens	4×100 m medley
Gold medal – first place	2000 Athens	4×200 m freestyle
Gold medal – first place	2002 Moscow	4×100 m freestyle
Pan Pacific Championships
Gold medal – first place	1997 Fukuoka	4×100 m freestyle
Silver medal – second place	2002 Yokohama	4x100 m freestyle
Pan American Games
Gold medal – first place	1999 Winnipeg	4×200 m freestyle
Silver medal – second place	1999 Winnipeg	200 m freestyle
Silver medal – second place	1999 Winnipeg	4x100 m freestyle
Silver medal – second place	1999 Winnipeg	4x100 m medley
Universiade
Gold medal – first place	1995 Fukuoka	4×100 m freestyle

Scott Eric Tucker (born February 18, 1976) is an American former competition swimmer, who competed for Auburn University, an Olympic gold medalist in the 4x100 freestyle relay at both the 1996 Athens and 2000 Sydney Olympics, and a former world record-holder. Excelling in international competition, he captured a total of fourteen medals at the Short and Long Course World Championships, and the Pan Pacific, Pan American and University Games from 1995-2003.

== Early swimming ==
Tucker was born on February 18, 1976 in Birmingham Alabama, and attended and swam for the Seminole High School Warhawks in Pinellas County, Florida. As a Junior at Seminole in 1991, he broke district records in the 200 free and 100 butterfly at the 4A District 4 meet. As a highpoint in 1991, he won his first state title in the 200 freestyle in 1:38.05, breaking a state 4A record and becoming a High School All American. At the 1991 State Meet, he also swam a second place 51.25 in the 100-yard butterfly, setting another county record. Tucker was voted to the Tampa Bay Times All-County swim team in December, 1991. In addition to his high school training and competition, he competed and trained for the West Florida Lightning Aquatics Club under Coach Mike Stewart.

=== Auburn University ===
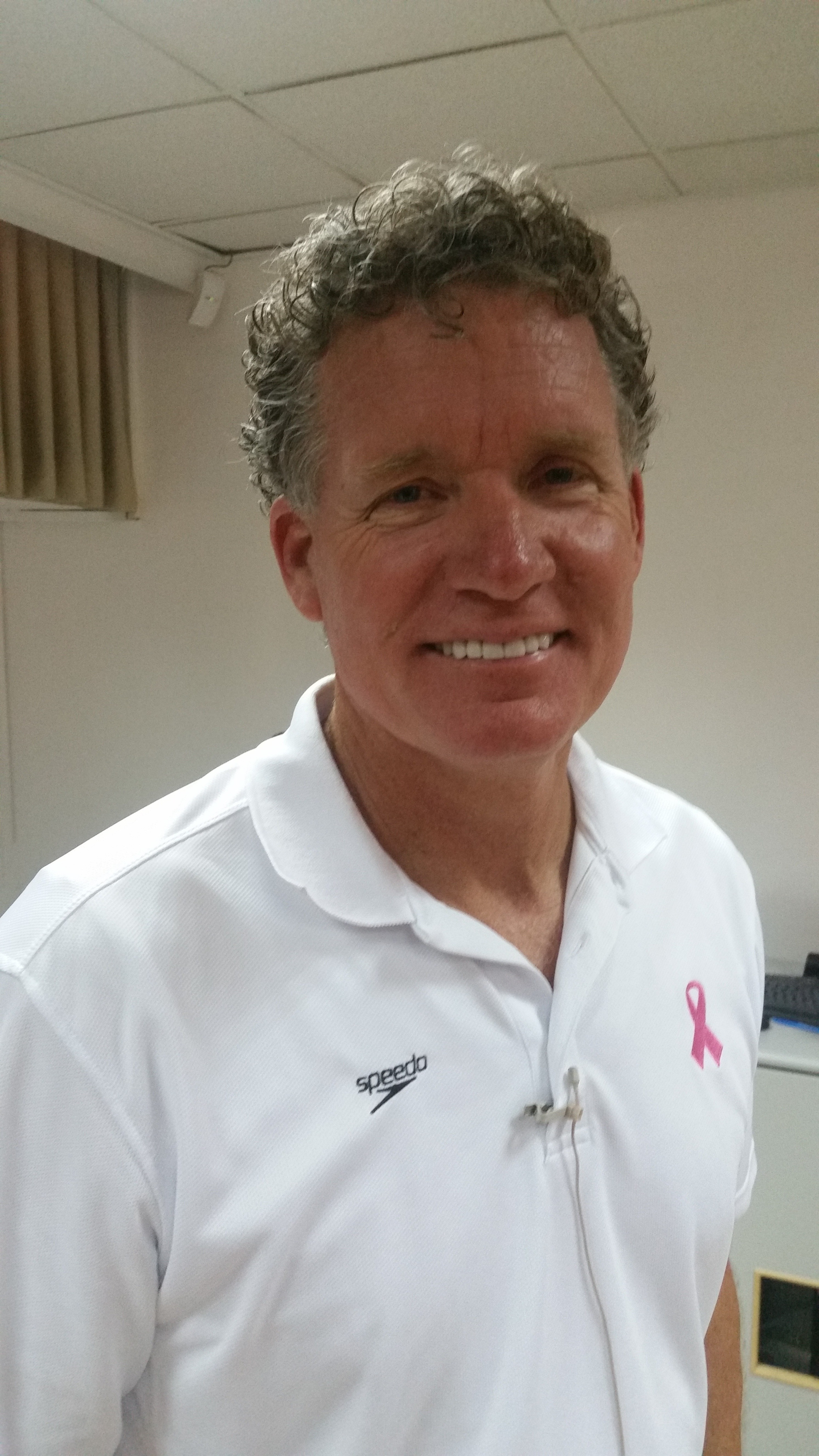
Auburn Coach David Marsh

Tucker attended Auburn University where he swam under Head Coach David Marsh and trained and competed for Irvine Novaquatics after his collegiate years, as well as Auburn Aquatics in the summer during his time at Auburn. In 1996, the Auburn Tigers finished second to Texas in the NCAAs. In 1997, Tucker won the Commissioner's Trophy with the most points at the SEC Championship, leading the Tigers to the team title. In 1997, with Tucker as a Senior, the Auburn Tigers were the second highest rated team in the nation. In 1997, Auburn won its third successive Southeastern Conference title. Tucker was part of a relay team that set an SEC conference record in the 400 freestyle relay with a time of 2:53.28.

== Olympic medals ==
Tucker represented the United States at two consecutive Summer Olympics. He won a gold at the 1996 Atlanta Olympics in the 4x100 meter freestyle where he swam second in the third preliminary heat for a combined time of 3:18.40. Later, the American team, without Scott, had a combined time of 3:15.41 in the 4×100 m freestyle finals.

He also took a silver medal in the 2000 Sydney Olympics with the U.S. 4x100 relay team swimming first in the third preliminary heat of the men's 4×100-meter freestyle recording a combined time of 3:15.43. Later the American 4x100 team, swimming without Scott in the finals had a combined time of 3:13.86.

=== International competition ===
Tucker was highly accomplished in international competition, capturing 14 medals including seven golds in international competition, nearly all in relay events. In individual competition at the 1999 Pan Americans, he captured a silver in the 200 freestyle. Medaling exclusively in relay events, he won a single gold at the 1998 World Championships and a silver at the 2003 World Championships. He captured three gold medals at the Short-Course World Championships in 2000 and 2002, again entirely in relays. Tucker took home four total medals including a gold in the 4x200 free relay at the 1999 Pan American Games. He captured a gold medal in the 4x100 free relay at both the 1997 Pan Pacifics and the 1995 Universiade.

He later worked in coaching and produced a few instructional videos intended to teach children swimming skills.

== See also ==
- List of Auburn University people
- List of Olympic medalists in swimming (men)
- List of World Aquatics Championships medalists in swimming (men)
- World record progression 4 × 200 metres freestyle relay
