= Denis Pimankov =

Russian swimmer

Personal information
- Full name: Денис Сергеевич Пиманков
- Nationality: Russia
- Born: 4 February 1975 (age 51) Omsk, Russian SFSR, Soviet Union
- Height: 1.90 m (6 ft 3 in)
- Weight: 87 kg (192 lb)

Sport
- Sport: Swimming
- Strokes: Freestyle
- Club: VFSO Dynamo; Khanty-Mansiyskogo AO; Omsk/FSO Profsoyuzov
Medal record
Men's swimming
Representing Russia
Olympic Games
Silver medal – second place	1996 Atlanta	4×100 m freestyle
World Championships (LC)
Gold medal – first place	2003 Barcelona	4×100 m freestyle
Bronze medal – third place	1998 Perth	4×100 m freestyle
World Championships (SC)
Silver medal – second place	1995 Rio de Janeiro	100 m butterfly
Bronze medal – third place	1995 Rio de Janeiro	4×100 m medley
Bronze medal – third place	2000 Athens	4×200 m freestyle
Bronze medal – third place	2002 Moscow	4×100 m freestyle
Bronze medal – third place	2002 Moscow	4×100 m medley
European Championships (LC)
Gold medal – first place	1997 Seville	4×100 m freestyle
Gold medal – first place	2000 Helsinki	4×100 m freestyle
Silver medal – second place	1999 Istanbul	4×100 m freestyle
Silver medal – second place	2004 Madrid	4×100 m freestyle
European Championships (SC)
Silver medal – second place	2000 Valencia	100 m freestyle
Summer Universiade
Gold medal – first place	1999 Majorca	100 m freestyle

Denis Sergeyevich Pimankov (Russian: Денис Серге́евич Пиманков; born 4 February 1975 in Omsk) is a freestyle swimmer from Russia, who won several medals as a member of the freestyle relay team (4×100 m and 4×200 m) during the late 1990s and early 2000s. He competed in three consecutive Summer Olympics for Russia, starting in 1996.
