= Scott Goodman =

Australian swimmer

Personal information
- Full name: Scott Linton Goodman
- National team: Australia
- Born: 20 August 1973 (age 53) Hobart, Tasmania
- Height: 1.84 m (6 ft 0 in)
- Weight: 77 kg (170 lb)

Sport
- Sport: Swimming
- Strokes: Butterfly
Medal record
Men's swimming
Representing Australia
Olympic Games
Bronze medal – third place	1996 Atlanta	200 m butterfly
World Championships (SC)
Gold medal – first place	1995 Rio de Janeiro	200 m butterfly
Bronze medal – third place	1997 Gothenburg	200 m butterfly
Pan Pacific Championships
Silver medal – second place	1995 Atlanta	200 m butterfly
Silver medal – second place	1997 Fukuoka	4x100 m medley
Bronze medal – third place	1997 Fukuoka	200 m butterfly

Scott Linton Goodman (born 20 August 1973) is an Australian butterfly swimmer who competed at the 1996 Summer Olympics in Atlanta, winning a bronze medal in the 200-metre butterfly. He was also an Australian Institute of Sport scholarship holder.

Born and raised in Tasmania, Goodman was selected for his debut at the 1991 Pan Pacific Championships, but then missed selection for the 1992 Summer Olympics the following year. He was selected for 1993 Pan Pacific Championships in Kobe, Japan, but was forced to withdraw with glandular fever. He defied medical experts who claimed that he would never swim competitively again in 1994, and won a silver medal in the 200-metre butterfly at the 1995 Pan Pacific Championships in Atlanta, Georgia.

In 1996, Goodman went into the 1996 Summer Olympics in Atlanta as the No. 1 ranked swimmer, and fastest qualifier in the heats of the 200-metre butterfly. However, he succumbed to pressure, executing poor turns, finishing with a bronze medal behind Denis Pankratov of Russia and Tom Malchow of the United States.

In 1998, Goodman went to the World Swimming Championships in Perth, but overbalanced and fell into the pool during the final. He was deemed to have entered the water deliberately and was disqualified for a false start. Goodman reacted by throwing and knocking over a poolside chair as he left the arena. Devastated, he quit swimming, but resumed training in 1999 in order to attempt to qualify for the 2000 Summer Olympics in Sydney. He failed to gain selection for the Sydney Olympics.

== See also ==
- List of Olympic medalists in swimming (men)

== Bibliography ==
- Andrews, Malcolm (2000). Australia at the Olympic Games.
