= Scott Logan (swimmer) =

Australian swimmer

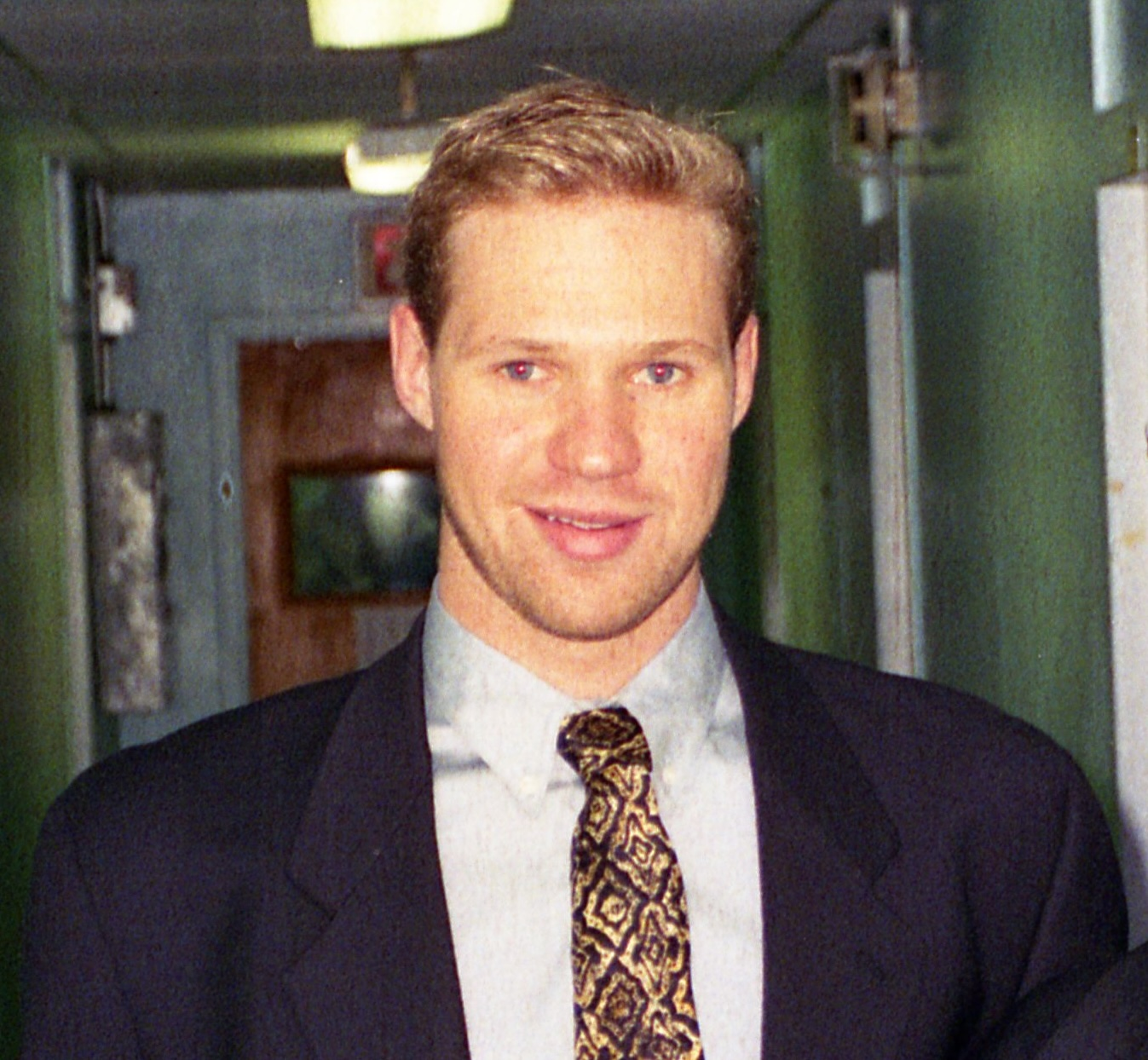
- Logan at the 1996 Olympic Games

Personal information
- Full name: Scott Matthew Logan
- National team: Australia
- Born: 24 July 1976 (age 50) Brisbane, Queensland
- Height: 1.89 m (6 ft 2 in)
- Weight: 83 kg (183 lb)

Sport
- Sport: Swimming
- Strokes: Freestyle
Medal record
Men's swimming
Representing Australia
World Championships (SC)
Bronze medal – third place	1997 Gothenburg	4×100 m free
Pan Pacific Championships
Silver medal – second place	1997 Fukuoka	4×100 m free

Scott Matthew Logan (born 24 July 1976) is a former swimmer who competed for Australia at the 1996 Summer Olympics in Atlanta, Georgia.

Logan trained under Bernie Wakefield. He swam in the 4×100-metre freestyle relay alongside Michael Klim, Matthew Dunn and Chris Fydler at the 1996 Olympics. Logan also represented Australia at the 1997 FINA World Swimming Championships (25 m) and the 1997 Pan Pacific Swimming Championships.
