= Ian Vander-Wal =

Australian swimmer

Personal information
- Full name: Ian Daniel Vander-Wal
- National team: Australia
- Born: 22 September 1971 (age 54) Darwin, Northern Territory
- Height: 1.95 m (6 ft 5 in)
- Weight: 90 kg (198 lb)

Sport
- Sport: Swimming
- Strokes: Freestyle
- Club: Commercial Swim Club
Medal record
Men's swimming
Representing Australia
Commonwealth Games
Gold medal – first place	1990 Auckland	4 x 100 freestyle
Pan Pacific Championships
Silver medal – second place	1997 Fukuoka	4×100 m free
Silver medal – second place	1997 Fukuoka	4×200 m free

Ian Daniel Vander-Wal (born 22 September 1971) is an Australian former sprint and middle-distance freestyle swimmer who represented Australia at the 1996 Summer Olympics in Atlanta. He was a member of the 4x100-metre and 4x200-metre freestyle relay teams. He trained at the Commercial Swimming Club in Brisbane.

He also competed at the 1997 Pan Pacific Swimming Championships in Fukuoka, Japan, where he combined with Michael Klim, Grant Hackett and Ian Thorpe to earn a silver medal in the 4x200-metre freestyle relay. He was an Australian Institute of Sport scholarship holder from 1989 to 1992.

== See also ==
- List of Commonwealth Games medallists in swimming (men)
