= Edward Parenti =

Canadian swimmer (born 1971)

Personal information
- Full name: Edward Parenti
- Nickname: "Eddie"
- National team: Canada
- Born: June 26, 1971 (age 55) Montreal, Quebec
- Height: 1.80 m (5 ft 11 in)
- Weight: 79 kg (174 lb)

Sport
- Sport: Swimming
- Strokes: Butterfly, freestyle
- Club: Pacific Dolphins
Medal record
Men's swimming
Representing Canada
Pan Pacific Championships
Bronze medal – third place	1991 Edmonton	4x200 m freestyle
Bronze medal – third place	1997 Fukuoka	4x100 m medley
Commonwealth Games
Silver medal – second place	1990 Auckland	4x200 m freestyle
Pan American Games
Bronze medal – third place	1995 Mar del Plata	4x100 m medley

Edward "Eddie" Parenti (born June 26, 1971) is a Canadian former competitive swimmer who specialized in freestyle and butterfly events. Parenti represented Canada at the 1992 Summer Olympics in Barcelona, Spain, and finished in 26th place in the 200-metre butterfly, 27th place in the 400-metre freestyle, and ninth place with the men's 4x200-metre freestyle relay team. He also participated in the 1996 Summer Olympics in Atlanta, Georgia.
