= Richard Upton =

Australian swimmer

Personal information
- Born: 1975 (age 50–51)
- Height: 6'3
- Weight: 76 kg (168 lb)

Sport
- Sport: Swimming
- Club: Carlile
Medal record
Representing Australia
World Championships (LC)
Silver medal – second place	1998 Perth	4×100 m freestyle
World Championships (SC)
Silver medal – second place	1995 Rio de Janeiro	4×100 m freestyle
Bronze medal – third place	1997 Gothenburg	4×100 m freestyle
Pan Pacific Championships
Silver medal – second place	1995 Atlanta	4×100 m free
Silver medal – second place	1997 Fukuoka	4×100 m free

Richard Upton (born 1975) is an Australian retired swimmer who won three medals in the 4 × 100 m freestyle relay at the World Championships in 1995, 1997, and 1998.

In 1998, he was suspended from competitions for three months and lost $8,200 in fines and cancelled funding after a positive test for probenecid. The drug was prescribed to him by a doctor against the flu, but can also be used to mask steroids.
