= Gary Hall Jr. =

American swimmer (born 1974)

Gary Hall Jr. OLY
Personal information
- Full name: Gary Wayne Hall Jr.
- National team: United States
- Born: September 26, 1974 (age 52) Cincinnati, Ohio, U.S.
- Height: 6 ft 6 in (198 cm)
- Weight: 218 lb (99 kg)

Sport
- Sport: Swimming
- Strokes: Freestyle
- Club: The Race Club
- College team: University of Texas
- Coach: Bill Doebbler (Brophy Prep); Eddie Reese (U. of Texas)
Medal record
Men's swimming
Representing United States
Event	1st	2nd	3rd
Olympic Games	5	3	2
World Championships (LC)	3	3	0
Pan Pacific Championships	4	1	0
Pan American Games	1	1	1
Total	13	8	3
Olympic Games
Gold medal – first place	1996 Atlanta	4×100 m freestyle
Gold medal – first place	1996 Atlanta	4×100 m medley
Gold medal – first place	2000 Sydney	50 m freestyle
Gold medal – first place	2000 Sydney	4×100 m medley
Gold medal – first place	2004 Athens	50 m freestyle
Silver medal – second place	1996 Atlanta	50 m freestyle
Silver medal – second place	1996 Atlanta	100 m freestyle
Silver medal – second place	2000 Sydney	4×100 m freestyle
Bronze medal – third place	2000 Sydney	100 m freestyle
Bronze medal – third place	2004 Athens	4×100 m freestyle
World Championships (LC)
Gold medal – first place	1994 Rome	4×100 m freestyle
Gold medal – first place	1994 Rome	4×100 m medley
Gold medal – first place	1998 Perth	4×100 m freestyle
Silver medal – second place	1994 Rome	50 m freestyle
Silver medal – second place	1994 Rome	100 m freestyle
Silver medal – second place	1998 Perth	4×100 m medley
Pan Pacific Championships
Gold medal – first place	1995 Atlanta	50 m freestyle
Gold medal – first place	1995 Atlanta	100 m freestyle
Gold medal – first place	1995 Atlanta	4×100 m freestyle
Gold medal – first place	1995 Atlanta	4×100 m medley
Silver medal – second place	1999 Sydney	50 m freestyle
Pan American Games
Gold medal – first place	1995 Mar del Plata	4×100 m freestyle
Silver medal – second place	2007 Rio de Janeiro	4×100 m freestyle
Bronze medal – third place	2003 Santo Domingo	50 m freestyle

Gary Wayne Hall Jr. (born September 26, 1974) is an American former competition swimmer who represented the United States at the 1996, 2000, and 2004 Olympics and won ten Olympic medals (five gold, three silver, two bronze). He is a former world record-holder in two relay events. Hall is well known for his "pro-wrestling-like" antics before a competition, frequently strutting onto the pool deck in boxing shorts and robe, shadow boxing and flexing for the audience.

== Early life and swimming ==
Hall was born September 26, 1974 in Cincinnati, Ohio. He attended the all male private school Brophy College Preparatory, in Phoenix, Arizona where he swam under Coach Bill Doebbler. At the 1992 5A State Championships at Hildenbrand Aquatic Center, Hall set a meet record and five state records, and received All American Honors in each of the six swimming events. He set a state record of 20.32 in the 50-yard freestyle, and set another state record of 43.85 in the 100-yard freestyle. He also swam on teams that set state records in the 200-yard medley relay, the 200-yard freestyle relay, and the 400-yard freestyle relay. As a high school swimmer, Hall Jr. was rated first nationally in the 50 and 100-yard freestyle.

His father, Gary Hall Sr., also competed in three Olympics as a swimmer (1968, 1972, and 1976). His maternal uncle, Charles Keating III, swam in the 1976 Olympics, and his maternal grandfather, Charles Keating Jr., was a national swimming champion in the 1940s.

Hall's cousin is Chief petty officer Charles Keating IV, a Navy SEAL, who was killed at age 31 in combat with ISIS in Iraq in 2016. He was posthumously awarded the Navy Cross for his actions in combat.

=== University of Texas ===
Hall signed to attend the University of Texas in the Spring of 1993 while at Brophy College Preparatory School. During his years at Texas, he swam under Hall of Fame Coach Eddie Reese. At Texas, he specialized in freestyle and swam butterfly, and was outstanding in sprint events. He won NCAA titles at Texas, and received honors as an All-American, though he did not graduate from the University, needing to shift his focus to international competition.

== Olympics ==
=== 1996 Atlanta games ===
In his first Olympics at the age of 21 in Atlanta, Hall had only 6 years of swimming experience yet he already had a well-known rivalry with Russia's Alexander Popov. Hall and his teammates dominated the relay events, but Popov beat Hall and dominated in the individual events.

Hall won two individual silvers and two team relay golds at the games, including helping set the world record in both the 400 m freestyle and medley relays.

=== 2000 Sydney games ===
Hall's success continued in the 2000 Summer Olympics held in Sydney, Australia. He won the gold medal in the individual 50 m freestyle, tying with his fellow U.S. Team member Anthony Ervin, and won the gold and silver in the team relays. He also won a bronze in the individual 100-meter freestyle race.

Prior to the 4 × 100 m freestyle relay, Hall posted on his blog: "My biased opinion says that we will smash them (Australia's 4 × 100 m team) like guitars. Historically the U.S. has always risen to the occasion. But the logic in that remote area of my brain says it won't be so easy for the United States to dominate the waters this time." The Australian media seized upon the "guitars" comment to fuel the upcoming rivalry between the Australians and Americans in the pool, with Hall vilified as an "Ugly American".

Hall swam the last leg in the relay, against Australian Ian Thorpe. He had a better start and came up a half body-length in front of Thorpe. Though he led the first length and was 0.23 seconds ahead at the turn, Thorpe fought back, and with 15 meters to go both swimmers were even; Thorpe finished first by a hand-length, inflicting the United States' with their only Olympic defeat in the event. The Australian team responded to Hall's remarks after the race by playing air guitar on the pool deck. Hall recalled the race, saying, "I don't even know how to play the guitar...I consider it the best relay race I've ever been part of. I doff my cap to the great Ian Thorpe. He had a better finish than I had." Another member of Australia's victorious 4 × 100 team, Michael Klim, recalled that "Hall was the first swimmer to come over and congratulate us. Even though he dished it out, he was a true sportsman." The decisive moment in the relay race had been Klim's opening leg where he set a new 100-meter world record of 48.18, gaining a 0.71-second advantage over Anthony Ervin, a lead which his Australian teammates successfully defended. Hall clocked a faster 100 meters than Thorpe (48.24 to 48.30), but got out-touched to the wall by Thorpe (who earlier in the night set a new world record to win gold in the 400 meter freestyle).

=== 2004 Athens games ===
At the 2004 Summer Olympics, Hall again won the gold medal in 50 m freestyle. At 29, he became the oldest American male Olympic swimmer since Duke Kahanamoku competed at age 34 in 1924. Despite having swum the fastest 50 in the year leading up to the 2004 Games, he was regarded as a long-shot to medal in the 50 m freestyle. He also won a bronze medal for competing in the preliminary heat of the 4 × 100-meter freestyle relay.

=== 1996–2000 ===
In 1998, Hall was suspended by the International Swimming Federation (FINA) for marijuana use.

In 1999, he was diagnosed with Type 1 diabetes, commonly referred to as childhood or juvenile diabetes. Upon his diagnosis, Hall struggled with the possibilities and the effects he knew the medical condition would have on his life. He took a short hiatus from swimming, but returned to compete in the 2000 U.S. Olympic Trials. There he won the 50 m freestyle and placed second in the 100 m freestyle. His 50 m time of 21.76 seconds set a new American record, beating the ten-year-old record set by Tom Jager.

=== 2008 Olympic trials ===
On July 5, 2008, Hall failed to qualify for the 2008 Olympic team after finishing fourth in the 50-meter finals at the US Olympic Trials in Omaha, Nebraska.

== The Race Club ==
The Race Club is a swimming club founded by Hall and his father, Gary Hall Sr. The club, originally known as "The World Team", was designed to serve as a training group for elite swimmers around the world in preparation for the 2000 Sydney Olympic Games. To be able to train with the Race Club, one must either have been ranked in the top 20 in the world the past 3 calendar years or top 3 in their nation in the past year. The Race Club included such well-known swimmers as Roland Mark Schoeman, Mark Foster, Ryk Neethling, Ricky Busquet and Therese Alshammar. They were coached by University of Michigan coach Mike Bottom.

The Race Club offers various swimming camps, swim clinics, and swimming technique video recording year round for young swimmers at their Islamorada, Florida-based training center.

== Shark attack ==
In the summer of 2006, Hall's sister, Bebe Hall, was attacked by a blacktip reef shark near Islamorada, while she and Gary were spearfishing, an attack for which Bebe Hall needed 19 stitches. Gary Hall repeatedly punched the shark and his sister shot a spear into it, after which the shark swam off.

== Personality ==
Hall has long been one of competitive swimming's most colorful personalities. He often shadow-boxes before a race and is known for wearing a boxing robe in lieu of the usual warm-ups. The robe even earned Hall a fine during the 2004 Olympics, as the Everlast-made apparel violated the uniform supply agreement the team had with Speedo. His eccentricity has won him a great deal of fans, but what some perceive to be "showboating" has drawn substantial criticism. He is also an outspoken critic of performance-enhancing drug use in swimming, and is one of the few prominent swimmers willing to publicly question the legitimacy of suspected individual accomplishments. In 2008, he compared International Swimming Hall of Fame inductee Amy Van Dyken to disgraced track & field athlete Marion Jones, noting they were both clients of the Bay Area Laboratory Co-Operative (BALCO).

== Personal life ==
In his post-swimming careers, after being diagnosed with diabetes, he consulted in healthcare focused on diabetes care, and providing market and public relations for the illness, and provided advocacy.

On January 7, 2025, Hall lost his home and his Olympic medals in the Palisades Fire. In response, IOC president Thomas Bach promised Hall that there would be replicas made for him.

== Additional honors ==
- Former American record holder in the 50-meter freestyle.
- Humanitarian Award winner at 2004 Golden Goggle Awards.
- On April 30, 2012, it was announced that Gary Hall Jr. would be inducted into the U.S. Olympic Hall of Fame in July 2012.

== See also ==
- List of multiple Summer Olympic medalists
- List of multiple Olympic gold medalists
- List of multiple Olympic medalists at a single Games
- List of Olympic medalists in swimming (men)
- List of University of Texas at Austin alumni
- List of World Aquatics Championships medalists in swimming (men)
- World record progression 4 × 100 metres freestyle relay
- World record progression 4 × 100 metres medley relay
