= 1997 Pan Pacific Swimming Championships =

International swimming competition

- Host city: Fukuoka, Japan
- Date: August 10–13, 1997
- Nations: 17

The seventh edition of the Pan Pacific Swimming Championships, a long course (50 m) event, was held in Fukuoka, Japan, from August 10–13, 1997.

== Competing nations ==
- Australia
- Canada
- China
- Chinese Taipei
- Costa Rica
- Guam
- Hong Kong
- Jamaica
- Japan
- South Korea
- Mexico
- New Zealand
- Puerto Rico
- South Africa
- Thailand
- United States
- Uzbekistan

== Results ==
=== Men's events ===
Event	Gold		Silver		Bronze	
50 m freestyle	Bill Pilczuk (USA); Ricardo Busquets (PUR)	22.42	Not awarded		David Fox (USA)	22.69
100 m freestyle	Michael Klim (AUS)	49.46 OC	Neil Walker (USA)	49.57	Ricardo Busquets (PUR)	49.94
200 m freestyle	Michael Klim (AUS)	1:47.60 CR	Josh Davis (USA)	1:48.17	Trent Bray (NZL)	1:49.27
400 m freestyle	Grant Hackett (AUS)	3:47.27 CR	Ian Thorpe (AUS)	3:49.64	Chad Carvin (USA)	3:50.40
800 m freestyle	Grant Hackett (AUS)	7:50.30	Chad Carvin (USA)	7:57.82	Tyler Painter (USA)	8:01.17
1500 m freestyle	Grant Hackett (AUS)	15:13.25	Tyler Painter (USA)	15:17.01	Chad Carvin (USA)	15:17.18
100 m backstroke	Lenny Krayzelburg (USA)	54.43 CR	Neil Walker (USA)	55.27	Mark Versfeld (CAN)	55.55
200 m backstroke	Lenny Krayzelburg (USA)	1:57.87 CR	Mark Versfeld (CAN)	1:59.61 NR	Brad Bridgewater (USA)	2:00.04
100 m breaststroke	Kurt Grote (USA)	1:01.22 CR	Phil Rogers (AUS)	1:01.85	Jarrod Marrs (USA)	1:02.64
200 m breaststroke	Kurt Grote (USA)	2:14.05	Yoshiaki Okita (JPN)	2:14.59	Tom Wilkens (USA)	2:14.80
100 m butterfly	Neil Walker (USA)	52.76 CR, AM	Michael Klim (AUS)	52.94	Nate Dusing (USA)	53.26
200 m butterfly	Uğur Taner (USA)	1:57.35 CR	Tom Malchow (USA)	1:57.71	Scott Goodman (AUS)	1:58.34
200 m individual medley	Matthew Dunn (AUS)	2:01.14	Curtis Myden (CAN)	2:01.83	Ron Karnaugh (USA)	2:02.25
400 m individual medley	Matthew Dunn (AUS)	4:16.11 OC	Curtis Myden (CAN)	4:16.30	Trent Steed (AUS)	4:21.07
4×100 m freestyle relay	United States; Scott Tucker (49.86); Brad Schumacher (49.66); Jon Olsen (49.69); Neil Walker (48.97)	3:18.18	Australia; Michael Klim (49.15) OC; Richard Upton (50.11); Scott Logan (50.21); Ian van der Wal (49.86)	3:19.33; OC	New Zealand; John Steel (51.16); Nicholas Tongue (50.55); Danyon Loader (51.01); Trent Bray (49.77)	3:22.49
4×200 m freestyle relay	United States; Chad Carvin (1:48.26); Tom Malchow (1:50.04); Uğur Taner (1:48.34); Josh Davis (1:47.35)	7:13.99 CR	Australia; Michael Klim (1:47.56); Ian Thorpe (1:50.86); Ian van der Wal (1:49.35); Grant Hackett (1:47.95)	7:15.72	New Zealand; Trent Bray (1:50.24); Scott Cameron (1:52.72); Nicholas Tongue (1:53.99); Danyon Loader (1:51.38)	7:28.33
4×100 m medley relay	United States; Lenny Krayzelburg (54.74); Kurt Grote (1:00.59); Nate Dusing (52.67); Neil Walker (49.03)	3:36.93 CR	Australia; Adrian Radley (56.01); Phil Rogers (1:01.78); Scott Goodman (53.34); Michael Klim (48.60)	3:39.73	Canada; Mark Versfeld (56.35); Morgan Knabe (1:04.28); Edward Parenti (53.92); Stephen Clarke (49.53)	3:43.98

Legend: WR – World record; CR – Championship record; CWR – Commonwealth record; NR – National record

=== Women's events ===
Event	Gold		Silver		Bronze	
50 m freestyle	Le Jingyi (CHN)	25.24	Jenny Thompson (USA)	25.42	Nicole De Man (USA)	25.66
100 m freestyle	Jenny Thompson (USA)	54.82	Le Jingyi (CHN)	54.86	Catherine Fox (USA)	56.07
200 m freestyle	Claudia Poll (CRC)	1:57.48	Le Jingyi (CHN)	2:00.54	Joanne Malar (CAN)	2:01.12
400 m freestyle	Claudia Poll (CRC)	4:06.56	Brooke Bennett (USA)	4:09.77	Diana Munz (USA)	4:14.03
800 m freestyle	Brooke Bennett (USA)	8:26.36	Claudia Poll (CRC)	8:29.05	Diana Munz (USA)	8:29.06
1500 m freestyle	Brooke Bennett (USA)	16:10.24	Diana Munz (USA)	16.17.06	Erica Rose (USA)	16:29.06
100 m backstroke	Mai Nakamura (JPN)	1:01.13	Lea Maurer (USA)	1:01.35	Catherine Fox (USA)	1:01.83
200 m backstroke	Mai Nakamura (JPN)	2:11.40	Lea Maurer (USA)	2:12.25	Miki Nakao (JPN)	2:12.80
100 m breaststroke	Samantha Riley (AUS)	1:07.81	Penny Heyns (RSA)	1:08.85	Kristy Kowal (USA)	1:09.18
200 m breaststroke	Samantha Riley (AUS)	2:25.34	Masami Tanaka (JPN)	2:29.66	Lauren van Oosten (CAN)	2:29.83
100 m butterfly	Jenny Thompson (USA)	59.00	Ayari Aoyama (JPN)	59.35	Can Huijue (CHN)	59.64
200 m butterfly	Susie O'Neill (AUS)	2:08.59	Kristine Quance (USA)	2:09.29	Misty Hyman (USA)	2:11.53
200 m individual medley	Kristine Quance (USA)	2:13.79	Marianne Limpert (CAN)	2:14.91	Joanne Malar (CAN)	2:16.17
400 m individual medley	Kristine Quance (USA)	4:39.61	Maddy Crippen (USA)	4:43.20	Joanne Malar (CAN)	4:44.17
4×100 m freestyle relay	United States; Catherine Fox (55.80); Melanie Valerio (56.23); Nicole De Man (56.35); Jenny Thompson (55.39)	3:43.77	Canada; Shannon Shakespeare (56.73); Nicole Davey (57.06); Marianne Limpert (56.84); Laura Nicholls (55.94)	3:46.57	Australia; Sarah Ryan (56.53); Susie O'Neill (56.24); Kate Godfrey (57.42); Nadine Neumann (57.30)	3:47.49
4×200 m freestyle relay	United States; Lindsay Benko (2:01.81); Ashley Whitney (2:02.81); Jamie Cail (2:01.52); Jenny Thompson (2:01.68)	8:07.82	Canada; Jessica Deglau (2:01.98); Karine Chevrier (2:02.18); Andrea Schwartz (2:02.84); Joanne Malar (2:01.85)	8:08.85	Australia; Susie O'Neill (2:01.26); Sarah Ryan (2:05.59); Kate Godfrey (2:04.17); Nadine Neumann (2:02.90)	8:13.92
4×100 m medley relay	United States; Lea Maurer (1:01.52); Kristy Kowal (1:08.52); Richelle Fox (59.73); Jenny Thompson (54.50)	4:04.27	Australia; Meredith Smith (1:03.55); Samantha Riley (1:07.10); Susie O'Neill (59.87); Sarah Ryan (55.20)	4:05.72	Japan; Mai Nakamura (1:01.42); Junko Isoda (1:10.99); Ayari Aoyama (59.50); Sumika Minamoto (55.92)	4:07.83

Legend: WR – World record; CR – Championship record; CWR – Commonwealth record; NR – National record

== Medal table ==
Rank	Nation	Gold	Silver	Bronze	Total
1	United States (USA)	19	13	17	49
2	Australia (AUS)	10	7	4	21
3	Japan (JPN)	2	3	2	7
4	Costa Rica (CRC)	2	1	0	3
5	China (CHN)	1	2	1	4
6	Puerto Rico (PUR)	1	0	1	2
7	Canada (CAN)	0	6	6	12
8	South Africa (RSA)	0	1	0	1
9	New Zealand (NZL)	0	0	3	3
Totals (9 entries)		35	33	34	102
