= David Fox (swimmer) =

American swimmer (born 1971)

Personal information
- Full name: David Ashley Fox
- National team: United States
- Born: February 25, 1971 (age 55) Raleigh, North Carolina, U.S.
- Height: 6 ft 3 in (1.91 m)
- Weight: 170 lb (77 kg)

Sport
- Sport: Swimming
- Strokes: Freestyle
- Club: YOTA Swim Team (Capital Y)
- College team: North Carolina State University
- Coach: Don Easterling
Medal record
Men's swimming
Representing United States
Olympic Games
Gold medal – first place	1996 Atlanta	4×100 m freestyle
World Championships (SC)
Silver medal – second place	1993 Palma	4×100 m freestyle
Pan Pacific Championships
Gold medal – first place	1993 Kobe	4×100 m freestyle
Gold medal – first place	1995 Atlanta	4×100 m freestyle
Silver medal – second place	1995 Atlanta	50 m freestyle
Bronze medal – third place	1997 Fukuoka	50m freestyle
Summer Universiade
Gold medal – first place	1993 Buffalo	50 m freestyle
Gold medal – first place	1993 Buffalo	100 m freestyle
Gold medal – first place	1993 Buffalo	4×100 m freestyle
Gold medal – first place	1993 Buffalo	4×100 m medley

David Ashley Fox (born February 25, 1971) is an American investment banker and former competitive swimmer who won a gold medal at the 1996 Summer Olympics held in Atlanta. He was also a four-time gold medalist at the World University Games, also known as the Summer Universiade.

== Early life and college ==
Fox attended Jesse O. Sanderson High School in Raleigh, North Carolina. He swam at North Carolina State University in Raleigh, where he won seven Atlantic Coast Conference championships in individual events and one NCAA national championship. He also won eight Atlantic Coast Conference titles in relay events. As an undergraduate at NCSU, he was mentored by North Carolina State swimming Coach Don Easterling who led the team from 1971 to 1995.

Later, after receiving his master's degree in business administration at the University of North Carolina in Chapel Hill, he swam under the direction of North Carolina Head Coach Frank Comfort. At UNC, he also served as an Assistant Coach under Head Coach Comfort.

== International competition ==
In international competition, Fox captured gold medals in the 4x100 free at Pan Pacific Championships in both 1993 and 1995. He took another gold at the 1993 Universiade in the 4x100 free, and another medley relay gold at the Universiade. At the 1993 World Championships he competed successfully for a silver medal in the 4x100 free. Individually at the 1993 Universiade, he also won the 50 and 100 freestyles. He won a 50 freestyle silver at the Pan Pacific Championships in 1995 and later took a bronze in the 50 freestyle event at the Pan Pacific Championships in 1997.

Fox won a gold medal at the 1996 Summer Olympics, by competing in the preliminary heats for the United States in the 4×100 meter freestyle relay, an event the United States won in the final.

He later settled with his family in Atlanta, Georgia, after competing in the 1996 Olympics, he served in a position with Goldman Sachs as a managing director.

== Honors ==
As a Raleigh, North Carolina, native who also attended North Carolina State University, he was inducted into the North Carolina Sports Hall of Fame on May 6, 2016.

== See also ==
- List of Olympic medalists in swimming (men)
- World record progression 4 × 100 metres freestyle relay
