= Nick Tongue =

New Zealand swimmer

Personal information
- Full name: Walter Nicholas Henry Tongue
- Nationality: New Zealand
- Born: 8 April 1973 (age 53) Auckland, New Zealand

Sport
- Sport: Swimming
- Strokes: Freestyle
Medal record
Men's swimming
Representing New Zealand
World Championships (SC)
Gold medal – first place	1995 Rio	4x100m medley
Pan Pacific Championships
Bronze medal – third place	1995 Atlanta	4×100 m free
Bronze medal – third place	1997 Fukuoka	4×100 m free
Bronze medal – third place	1997 Fukuoka	4×200 m free
Commonwealth Games
Silver medal – second place	1994 Victoria	4x100 m freestyle

Walter Nicholas Henry Tongue (born 8 April 1973 in Auckland) is a former freestyle swimmer from New Zealand, who competed at the 1996 Summer Olympics in Atlanta, United States for his native country.
