= Brad Schumacher =

American swimmer (born 1974)

Personal information
- Full name: Bradley Darrell Schumacher
- National team: United States
- Born: March 6, 1974 (age 52) Bowie, Maryland, U.S.
- Height: 6 ft 4 in (1.93 m)
- Weight: 198 lb (90 kg)

Sport
- Sport: Swimming
- Strokes: Freestyle, water polo
- Club: Tiger Aquatics
- College team: University of the Pacific
Medal record
Men's swimming
Representing United States
Olympic Games
Gold medal – first place	1996 Atlanta	4×100 m freestyle
Gold medal – first place	1996 Atlanta	4×200 m freestyle
Pan Pacific Championships
Gold medal – first place	1997 Fukuoka	4×100 m freestyle
Universiade
Gold medal – first place	1995 Fukuoka	4×100 m freestyle

Bradley Darrell Schumacher (born March 6, 1974) is an American former competition swimmer, water polo player, and Olympic gold medalist. Schumacher is a two-time, two-sport Olympian. He was a member of the winning relay teams at the 1996 Summer Olympics. Four years later, he was a member of the U.S. men's water polo team at the 2000 Summer Olympics.

Schumacher's two gold medals came as a member of the U.S. men's swimming relay teams at the 1996 Olympics in Atlanta, Georgia: in the men's 4×100-meter freestyle relay and in the men's 4 × 200 m-meter freestyle relay. Although Schumacher qualified for both swimming and water polo for the 2000 Olympic Games, he chose to compete only in water polo. At the 2000 Olympics in Sydney, Australia, he helped the U.S. men's water polo team to a sixth-place finish. He was the top sprinter at the 2000 Olympics, with 20 sprints won.

Schumacher was the first American world champion in swimming and water polo since the 1904 Olympic Games. In 1997, he earned a gold medal at the Pan-Pacific Games and his first national championship at the U.S. Spring Nationals. In water polo, he has represented the U.S. at the FINA World Championships, FINA World Cup, World University Games and the Goodwill Games.

In 1998, Schumacher competed in World Championships in both sports and joined an elite group of aquatics stars that competed in both sports on the world-class level: Duke Khanamoku, Johnny Weissmuller, Bob Hughes, and Matt Biondi.

He was a swimming and water polo All-American in college for coach John Tanner at the University of the Pacific, in Stockton, California, where he completed bachelor's and master's degrees in business administration.

Schumacher is the co-founder of KAP7 International, Inc., a water polo equipment company, and he spends his time as the head coach of SET water polo club, a Southern California-based team that continues to rank among the top water polo clubs in the country. His 18-and-under girls club team won the gold medal at the 2009 S&R Sport National Junior Olympics.

== See also ==
- List of Olympic medalists in swimming (men)
- List of University of the Pacific (United States) people
