= Michael Klim =

Polish-born Australian swimmer (born 1977)

Michael Klim OAM
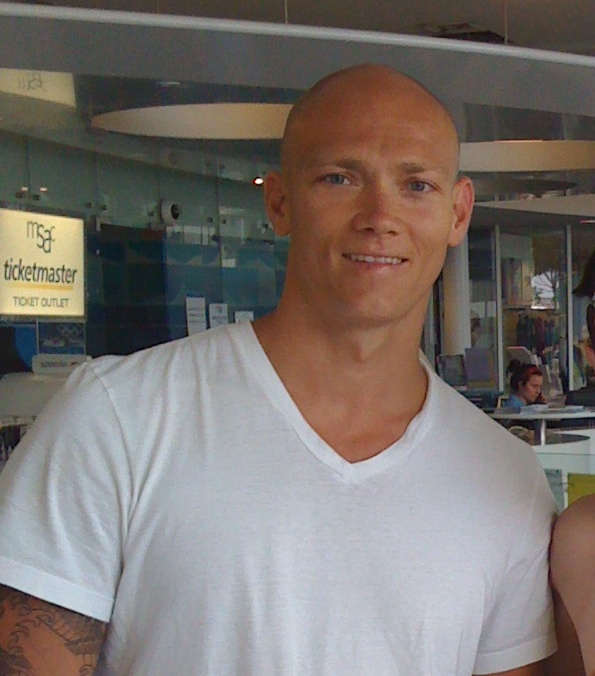

Personal information
- Full name: Michael George Klim
- National team: Australia
- Born: 13 August 1977 (age 49) Gdynia, Poland
- Height: 191 cm (6 ft 3 in)
- Weight: 81 kg (179 lb)
- Relative: Anna Klim (sister)

Sport
- Sport: Swimming
- Strokes: Freestyle
- Club: Melbourne Vicentre; Australian Institute of Sport
Medal record
Men's swimming
Representing Australia
Event	1st	2nd	3rd
Olympic Games	2	3	1
World Championships (LC)	7	2	2
World Championships (SC)	5	5	4
Pan Pacific Championships	5	6	0
Commonwealth Games	5	3	3
Total	24	19	10
Olympic Games
Gold medal – first place	2000 Sydney	4×100m freestyle
Gold medal – first place	2000 Sydney	4×200m freestyle
Silver medal – second place	2000 Sydney	100m butterfly
Silver medal – second place	2000 Sydney	4×100m medley
Silver medal – second place	2004 Athens	4×200m freestyle
Bronze medal – third place	1996 Atlanta	4×100m medley
World Championships (LC)
Gold medal – first place	1998 Perth	200m freestyle
Gold medal – first place	1998 Perth	100m butterfly
Gold medal – first place	1998 Perth	4×200m freestyle
Gold medal – first place	1998 Perth	4×100m medley
Gold medal – first place	2001 Fukuoka	4×100m freestyle
Gold medal – first place	2001 Fukuoka	4×200m freestyle
Gold medal – first place	2007 Melbourne	4×100m medley
Silver medal – second place	1998 Perth	100m freestyle
Silver medal – second place	1998 Perth	4×100m freestyle
Bronze medal – third place	1998 Perth	50m freestyle
Bronze medal – third place	2005 Montreal	4×100m freestyle
World Championships (SC)
Gold medal – first place	1995 Rio de Janeiro	4×200m freestyle
Gold medal – first place	1997 Gothenburg	4×200m freestyle
Gold medal – first place	1997 Gothenburg	4×100m medley
Gold medal – first place	1999 Hong Kong	4×100m freestyle
Gold medal – first place	1999 Hong Kong	4×100m medley
Silver medal – second place	1995 Rio de Janeiro	4×100m freestyle
Silver medal – second place	1995 Rio de Janeiro	4×100m medley
Silver medal – second place	1999 Hong Kong	100m freestyle
Silver medal – second place	1999 Hong Kong	200m freestyle
Silver medal – second place	1999 Hong Kong	100m butterfly
Bronze medal – third place	1995 Rio de Janeiro	200m freestyle
Bronze medal – third place	1997 Gothenburg	100m freestyle
Bronze medal – third place	1997 Gothenburg	100m butterfly
Bronze medal – third place	1997 Gothenburg	4×100m freestyle
Goodwill Games
Gold medal – first place	2001 Brisbane	100m freestyle
Gold medal – first place	2001 Brisbane	100m butterfly
Gold medal – first place	2001 Brisbane	4×100m freestyle
Silver medal – second place	2001 Brisbane	50m butterfly
Pan Pacific Championships
Gold medal – first place	1997 Fukuoka	100m freestyle
Gold medal – first place	1997 Fukuoka	200m freestyle
Gold medal – first place	1999 Sydney	100m freestyle
Gold medal – first place	1999 Sydney	100m butterfly
Gold medal – first place	1999 Sydney	4×100m freestyle
Gold medal – first place	1999 Sydney	4×200m freestyle
Silver medal – second place	1995 Atlanta	4×100m freestyle
Silver medal – second place	1997 Fukuoka	100m butterfly
Silver medal – second place	1997 Fukuoka	4×100m freestyle
Silver medal – second place	1997 Fukuoka	4×200m freestyle
Silver medal – second place	1997 Fukuoka	4×100m medley
Silver medal – second place	1999 Sydney	200m freestyle
Commonwealth Games
Gold medal – first place	1998 Kuala Lumpur	100m freestyle
Gold medal – first place	1998 Kuala Lumpur	4×100m freestyle
Gold medal – first place	1998 Kuala Lumpur	4×200m freestyle
Gold medal – first place	1998 Kuala Lumpur	4×100m medley
Gold medal – first place	2006 Melbourne	4×100m medley
Silver medal – second place	1998 Kuala Lumpur	200m freestyle
Silver medal – second place	2006 Melbourne	100m butterfly
Silver medal – second place	2006 Melbourne	4×100m freestyle
Bronze medal – third place	1998 Kuala Lumpur	50m freestyle
Bronze medal – third place	1998 Kuala Lumpur	100m butterfly
Bronze medal – third place	2006 Melbourne	50m butterfly

Michael George Klim, OAM (born 13 August 1977) is an Australian swimmer, Olympic gold medallist, world champion, and former world record-holder of the 1990s and 2000s. He is known as the creator of straight-arm freestyle.

== Early years ==
Klim was born in Gdynia, Poland, in 1977. Shortly after his birth, his father was appointed trade attaché to the consulate of the Polish People's Republic in Bombay (now Mumbai) and together with his older sister Klim learned to swim there. The family returned to Gdynia after five years in India. The family left Poland in 1987 and lived in Hamburg, Germany, where as a 10-year-old Klim competed nationally for a local swimming club. His father applied for a business visa for Australia, but as the process was slow, also applied for Canadian visas for the family and they soon moved to Toronto. Nine months later, their Australian visa was granted. The family arrived in Melbourne on 30 April 1989. Klim was educated at the University High School, and Wesley College, where he was later employed as the college's elite head coach of swimming.

== Career ==
Klim was first selected to represent Australia in the 1994 Commonwealth Games in Victoria, British Columbia, Canada, while still a student at Wesley College. For his achievements he was named the Male Swimmer of the Year by the magazine Swimming World in 1997.

In December 1999, he twice set a world record time – of 52.03s, then 51.81s two days later – in the 100m butterfly, in International Swimming Federation-sanctioned solo swims during a swim meet at the Australian Institute of Sport (AIS) in Canberra. It was broken at the 2003 World Championships in Barcelona by the Ukrainian Andriy Serdinov in the first semifinal of the 100m butterfly, and then broken another time in the next semifinal by Michael Phelps. Phelps's record was bested by fellow American Ian Crocker in the final the following day.

Klim was AIS Athlete of the Year in 1998 and 1999 and was inducted into the AIS 'Best of the Best' in 2001. Klim was the only Australian to win a gold medal at both the 2000 Summer Olympics and the 2006 Commonwealth Games.

On 26 June 2007 Klim retired from competitive swimming; he finished the year ranked 94 in the 100m freestyle with the Olympics 14 months away. However, on 14 February 2011 Klim announced his return to competitive swimming, hoping to compete in the 2012 Summer Olympics. Klim failed to qualify for the team and he retired from competitive swimming for a second time.

After his second retirement from swimming, in 2008, Klim founded a skin care company named "Milk and Co". During the COVID-19 pandemic, he stepped away from the business to establish a swim school in Bali, Klim Swim, in 2021.

== Medal achievements ==
Klim arrived at the 1996 Summer Olympics ranked first in the world for the 200m freestyle, but was surprisingly eliminated in the heats. He rebounded to qualify for the final in the 100m butterfly, and swam the freestyle leg in the 4×100m medley relay final, in which Australia claimed a bronze medal.

- Atlanta Olympics (USA)
  - Men's 4×100m Medley Relay

1998 was Klim's year in the sun. In January, the World Aquatics Championships were held in Perth, Western Australia, and in front of a boisterous home crowd, he was the leading swimmer of the meet. He triumphed in the 200m freestyle and the 100m butterfly, added silver in the 100m freestyle, and bronze in the 50m freestyle. He was a member of each of Australia's three relay teams, winning gold in the 4×200m freestyle relay and 4×100m medley relay; and a silver in the 4×100m freestyle relay.

- FINA World Championships 1998 in Perth, Australia
  - 200m Freestyle
  - 100m Freestyle
  - 50m Freestyle
  - 100m Butterfly
  - 4×100m Freestyle Relay
  - 4×200m Freestyle Relay
  - 4×100m Medley Relay

At the 2000 Summer Olympics, Klim set a world record (48.18s) leading off the 4×100m freestyle relay, which paved the way for a world record (3m13.67s). Three days later, he was part of the 4×200m freestyle relay, which set another world record (7m7.05s), which left the opposition more than five seconds in arrears on its way to victory. His 100m freestyle world record bested by Pieter van den Hoogenband in the semifinals, in the final he finished with a bitter fourth place; he turned first at the end of the first lap but he claimed his legs gave away in the second half. In the 100m butterfly, he was the world record holder, again turning first at the wall heavily under world record pace, but was cut down in the closing stages by Sweden's Lars Frölander, finishing second. On the final night he claimed silver as part of the 4×100m medley relay team.

- 2000 Summer Olympics in Sydney, Australia
  - 100m Butterfly
  - 4×100m Freestyle Relay
  - 4×200m Freestyle Relay
  - 4×100m Medley Relay

In 2001, hampered by an ankle injury Klim was restricted to relay duties, and contributed to another world record, winning gold in the 4×200m relay (7m4.66s). He also collected a gold medal in the 4×100m freestyle relay.

- FINA World Championships 2001 in Fukuoka, Japan
  - 4×100m Freestyle Relay
  - 4×200m Freestyle Relay

In 2002 and 2003, due to chronic back and shoulder problems, Klim was inactive.

Klim failed to qualify for the 2004 Summer Olympics, but was later selected as part of the relay team, which came second behind USA in the 4×200m race. The relay team did not win a medal in the 4x100m and failed to qualify for the medley relay final.

- 2004 Summer Olympics in Athens, Greece
  - 4×200m Freestyle Relay

In 2005, Klim swam at the World Aquatics in Montreal, returning to individual action, but failed to progress to the finals in the 50m & 100m Freestyle. He won bronze as part of the 4×100m freestyle relay.

- FINA World Championships 2005 in Montreal, Canada
  - 4×100m Freestyle Relay

In 2007, he swam as part of the B team in the Men's 4 × 100 metre medley relay; in the final the Australian team won the gold medal.

- 2007 World Aquatics Championships in Melbourne, Australia
  - 4×100m Medley Relay

== Personal life ==
Klim married Lindy Rama, a former model and fashion entrepreneur, in April 2006. The couple have two daughters, and a son. Klim and Rama, who is a Balinese princess through her father, moved to the Indonesian island of Bali in 2010 to raise their family but announced their separation in February 2016. Klim shares joint custody of his children and continues to live between Bali and Australia with his fiancée Michelle Owen. Klim and Owen, who met in 2019, became engaged in December 2025.

In July 2022, Klim revealed that he had been diagnosed with the auto-immune disorder chronic inflammatory demyelinating polyneuropathy (CIDP) in 2020, which has affected his legs and feet and left him struggling to walk unassisted. In May 2024, Klim and Owen launched the Klim Foundation. Its primary purpose is to raise awareness, provide support, and advocate for people living with CIDP.

In 2024, his autobiography Klim, written with sports journalist Nicole Jeffery, was published by Hachette.

In February 2026 Klim was the subject of an episode of the Australian documentary television programme Australian Story, detailing his battle with CIDP.

== See also ==
- List of Commonwealth Games medallists in swimming (men)
- List of Olympic medalists in swimming (men)
- World record progression 50 metres butterfly
- World record progression 100 metres butterfly
- World record progression 100 metres freestyle
- World record progression 4 × 100 metres freestyle relay
- World record progression 4 × 200 metres freestyle relay

Records
Preceded by Alexander Popov	Men's 100 metre freestyle world record holder (long course); 16 September 2000–19 September 2000	Succeeded by Pieter van den Hoogenband
Preceded by Denis Pankratov	Men's 100 metre butterfly world record holder (long course); 9 October 1997 – 25 July 2003	Succeeded by Andriy Serdinov
Preceded by Denis Pankratov	Men's 100 metre butterfly world record holder (short course); 22 January 1998 – 14 December 1998	Succeeded by James Hickman
Preceded by James Hickman	Men's 100 metre butterfly world record holder (short course); 2 September 1999 – 16 March 2000	Succeeded by Lars Frölander
Awards
Preceded by Denis Pankratov	Swimming World; Swimmer of the Year; 1997	Succeeded by Ian Thorpe
Preceded by Danyon Loader	Swimming World; Pacific Rim Swimmer of the Year; 1996	Succeeded by Ian Thorpe
Preceded by Megan Marcks and Kate Slatter	Australian Athlete of the Year; 1998, 1999	Succeeded by Simon Fairweather
