= Craig Hutchison (swimmer) =

Canadian swimmer (born 1975)

Personal information
- Full name: Craig Hutchison
- National team: Canada
- Born: May 1, 1975 (age 51) Montreal, Quebec
- Height: 1.98 m (6 ft 6 in)
- Weight: 97 kg (214 lb)

Sport
- Sport: Swimming
- Strokes: Freestyle
- Club: Pointe-Claire Swim Club
Medal record
Men's swimming
Representing Canada
Pan Pacific Championships
Bronze medal – third place	1999 Sydney	4x100 m freestyle

Craig Hutchison (born May 26, 1975) is a former freestyle swimmer from Canada, who competed for his native country at the 2000 Summer Olympics in Sydney, Australia. His best result was finishing in sixth place in the men's 4x100-metre medley relay event.

== See also ==
- List of Commonwealth Games medallists in swimming (men)
