= Shunsuke Ito =

Japanese swimmer (born 1976)

Personal information
- Full name: 伊藤 俊介
- Nationality: Japan
- Born: April 6, 1976 (age 50) Okayama
- Height: 1.84 m (6 ft 0 in)
- Weight: 76 kg (168 lb)

Sport
- Sport: Swimming
- Strokes: Freestyle
- College team: Chuo University
Medal record
Men's swimming
Pan Pacific Championships
| Bronze medal – third place | 1999 Sydney | 4x100 m medley |
Asian Games
| Gold medal – first place | 1998 Bangkok | 100 m freestyle |

Shunsuke Ito (伊藤 俊介, Itō Shunsuke; born April 6, 1976 in Okayama) is a retired male freestyle swimmer from Japan. He represented his native country at the 1996 Summer Olympics in Atlanta, Georgia.
