= Swimming at the 1998 World Aquatics Championships – Men's 400 metre freestyle =

Men's 400 metre freestyle at the 1998 FINA World Championships
- Date: 15 January 1998
- Competitors: 41 from 32 nations
- Winning time: 3 minute 46.29 seconds

Medalists
gold medal	Ian Thorpe	Australia
silver medal	Grant Hackett	Australia
bronze medal	Paul Palmer	Great Britain

The finals and the qualifying heats of the men's 400 metre freestyle event at the 1998 World Aquatics Championships were held on Thursday 15 January 1998 in Perth, Western Australia.

== Heats ==
Rank	Heat	Name	Nationality	Time	Notes
1	6	Emiliano Brembilla	Italy	3:50.61	
2	6	Ian Thorpe	Australia	3:51.42	
3	5	Grant Hackett	Australia	3:51.68	
4	5	Paul Palmer	Great Britain	3:51.71	
5	4	Massimiliano Rosolino	Italy	3:51.93	
6	4	Jörg Hoffmann	Germany	3:52.15	
7	5	Ihor Snitko	Ukraine	3:52.24	
8	4	Danyon Loader	New Zealand	3:52.44	
9	6	Ryk Neethling	South Africa	3:53.75	
10	4	John Piersma	United States	3:54.47	
11	5	Masato Hirano	Japan	3:55.28	
12	5	Jacob Cartensen	Denmark	3:55.38	
13	6	Tyler Painter	United States	3:55.61	
14	6	Luiz Lima	Brazil	3:55.81	
15	6	Béla Szabados	Hungary	3:57.12	
16	3	Andrei Cecan	Moldova	3:57.32	
17	5	Sergi Roure	Spain	3:57.42	
18	6	Frederik Hviid	Spain	3:57.49	
19	4	Alexei Stepanov	Russia	3:58.23	
20	4	Torlarp Sethsothorn	Thailand	3:58.71	
21	6	Jure Bucar	Slovenia	3:59.51	
22	3	Mark Kwok	Hong Kong	4:00.94	
23	4	Anders Jensen	Denmark	4:01.13	
24	5	Dimitrios Manganas	Greece	4:01.66	
25	3	Scott Talbot-Cameron	New Zealand	4:01.82	
26	4	Denys Zavhorodnyy	Ukraine	4:03.65	
27	5	Jin Hao	China	4:04.07	
28	3	Li Yun-Lun	Chinese Taipei	4:05.80	
29	3	Tom Stoltz	Luxembourg	4:06.08	
30	3	Ramon Valle	Honduras	4:07.13	
31	2	Alex Fong	Hong Kong	4:08.09	
32	3	Sng Ju Wei	Singapore	4:09.03	
33	3	Tseng Cheng-Hua	Chinese Taipei	4:09.07	
34	2	Kurt Niehaus	Costa Rica	4:11.84	
35	2	Diego Mularoni	San Marino	4:15.69	
36	2	Petr Vasiliev	Uzbekistan	4:16.28	
37	2	Fadi Kouzma	Syria	4:25.05	
38	2	Yann Rambert	Mauritius	4:26.75	
39	2	Michael Watson	Guyana	5:27.11	
–	1	Pedro Bonnelly	Dominican Republic	DNS	
–	1	Sebastien Paddington	Trinidad and Tobago	DNS	

== B Final ==
Rank	Name	Nationality	Time	Notes
9	Ryk Neethling	South Africa	3:50.95	
10	Luiz Lima	Brazil	3:52.97	
11	John Piersma	United States	3:53.32	
12	Jacob Carstensen	Denmark	3:55.86	
13	Masato Hirano	Japan	3:56.63	
14	Béla Szabados	Hungary	3:56.66	
15	Andrei Cecan	Moldova	3:56.68	
16	Tyler Painter	United States	3:57.30	

== A Final ==
Rank	Name	Nationality	Time	Notes
1st place, gold medalist(s)	Ian Thorpe	Australia	3:46.29	
2nd place, silver medalist(s)	Grant Hackett	Australia	3:46.44	
3rd place, bronze medalist(s)	Paul Palmer	Great Britain	3:48.02	
4	Emiliano Brembilla	Italy	3:48.60	
5	Massimiliano Rosolino	Italy	3:48.89	
6	Igor Snitko	Ukraine	3:50.16	
7	Jörg Hoffmann	Germany	3:51.70	
8	Danyon Loader	New Zealand	3:52.26	

== See also ==
- Swimming at the 1996 Summer Olympics – Men's 400 metre freestyle (Atlanta)
- 1997 FINA Short Course World Championships – Men's 400m Freestyle (Gothenburg)
- Swimming at the 1997 European Aquatics Championships – Men's 400 metre freestyle (Seville)
- Swimming at the 2000 Summer Olympics – Men's 400 metre freestyle (Sydney)
