= Swimming at the 1998 World Aquatics Championships – Men's 200 metre freestyle =

Men's 200 metre freestyle at the 1998 FINA World Championships
- Date: 12 January 1998
- Competitors: 27
- Winning time: 1 minute 47.41 seconds

Medalists
gold medal	Michael Klim	Australia
silver medal	Massimiliano Rosolino	Italy
bronze medal	Pieter v.d. Hoogenband	Netherlands

The finals and the qualifying heats of the men's 200 metres freestyle event at the 1998 World Aquatics Championships were held on Monday 12 January 1998 in Perth, Western Australia.

== A Final ==
Rank	Name	Time
Gold medal	Michael Klim (AUS)	1:47.41
Silver medal	Massimiliano Rosolino (ITA)	1:48.30
Bronze medal	Pieter van den Hoogenband (NED)	1:48.65
4	Jacob Carstensen (DEN)	1:49.74
5	Tom Malchow (USA)	1:50.05
6	Ryk Neethling (RSA)	1:50.08
7	Paul Palmer (GBR)	1:50.43
8	Gustavo Borges (BRA)	1:50.47

== B Final ==
Rank	Name	Time
9	Josh Davis (USA)	1:49.66
10	Matthew Dunn (AUS)	1:49.75
11	Trent Bray (NZL)	1:50.04
12	James Salter (GBR)	1:50.27
13	Shunsuke Ito (JPN)	1:51.38
14	Steffen Zesner (GER)	1:51.57
15	Danyon Loader (NZL)	1:51.84
16	Béla Szabados (HUN)	1:52.54

== Qualifying heats ==
Rank	Name	Time
1	Michael Klim (AUS)	1:47.96
2	Pieter van den Hoogenband (NED)	1:48.93
3	Massimiliano Rosolino (ITA)	1:49.29
4	Tom Malchow (USA)	1:49.54
5	Gustavo Borges (BRA)	1:49.64
6	Paul Palmer (GBR)	1:50.30
7	Jacob Carstensen (DEN)	1:50.37
8	Ryk Neethling (RSA)	1:50.38
9	Danyon Loader (NZL)	1:50.45
9	Trent Bray (NZL)	1:50.45
11	Josh Davis (USA)	1:50.65
12	Matthew Dunn (AUS)	1:50.80
13	James Salter (GBR)	1:50.91
14	Béla Szabados (HUN)	1:51.06
15	Shunsuke Ito (JPN)	1:51.17
16	Steffen Zesner (GER)	1:51.19
17	Marcel Wouda (NED)	1:51.40
18	Jacob Rasmussen (DEN)	1:51.58
19	Andrei Cecan (MDA)	1:51.68
20	Alexei Stepanov (RUS)	1:51.76
21	Anders Lyrbring (SWE)	1:51.86
22	Javier Botello (ESP)	1:53.23
23	Petter Lindh (SWE)	1:53.45
24	Jure Bučar (SLO)	1:53.70
25	Craig Hutchison (CAN)	1:53.78
26	Juan Torrado (ESP)	1:53.85
27	Dimitrios Manganas (GRE)	1:53.86

== See also ==
- 1996 Men's Olympic Games 200m Freestyle (Atlanta)
- 1997 Men's World SC Championships 200m Freestyle (Gothenburg)
- 1997 Men's European LC Championships 200m Freestyle (Seville)
- 2000 Men's Olympic Games 200m Freestyle (Sydney)
