= Swimming at the 1997 European Aquatics Championships – Men's 200 metre freestyle =

The final of the Men's 200 metres Freestyle event at the European LC Championships 1997 was held on Tuesday 19 August 1997 in Seville, Spain.

== Finals ==
RANK	FINAL A	TIME
	Paul Palmer (GBR)	1:48.85
	Massimiliano Rosolino (ITA)	1:49.02
	Béla Szabados (HUN)	1:49.98
4.	James Salter (GBR)	1:49.99
5.	Lars Frölander (SWE)	1:50.03
6.	Vladimir Pyshnenko (RUS)	1:50.13
7.	Marcel Wouda (NED)	1:50.37
8.	Anders Lyrbring (SWE)	1:50.58

RANK	FINAL B	TIME
9.	Jacob Carstensen (DEN)	1:50.84
10.	Igor Koleda (BLR)	1:50.93
11.	Dominic Matuzenicz (POL)	1:52.28
12.	Jacob Rasmussen (DEN)	1:52.41
13.	Javier Botello (ESP)	1:53.39
14.	Ricardo Pedroso (POR)	1:53.40
15.	Maciej Kajak (POL)	1:54.25
—	Zsolt Gáspár (HUN)	DSQ

== Qualifying heats ==
RANK	HEATS RANKING	TIME
1.	Massimiliano Rosolino (ITA)	1:49.19
2.	James Salter (GBR)	1:49.50
3.	Paul Palmer (GBR)	1:49.98
4.	Vladimir Pyshnenko (RUS)	1:50.22
5.	Marcel Wouda (NED)	1:50.25
6.	Lars Frölander (SWE)	1:50.44
7.	Béla Szabados (HUN)	1:51.08
7.	Anders Lyrbring (SWE)	1:51.08
9.	Pieter van den Hoogenband (NED)	1:51.26
10.	Jacob Carstensen (DEN)	1:51.98
11.	Dominic Matuzenicz (POL)	1:52.21
12.	Jacob Rasmussen (DEN)	1:52.29
13.	Javier Botello (ESP)	1:52.42
14.	Igor Koleda (BLR)	1:53.02
15.	Ricardo Pedroso (POR)	1:53.09
16.	Maciej Kajak (POL)	1:53.57
17.	Zsolt Gáspár (HUN)	1:53.79
18.	Adrian Andermatt (SUI)	1:53.81
19.	Dimitrios Manganas (GRE)	1:54.06
19.	Arūnas Savickas (LTU)	1:54.06
21.	Nicolae Butacu (ROM)	1:54.20
22.	Miguel Cabrita (POR)	1:54.77
23.	Tom Stoltz (LUX)	1:55.89
24.	Örn Arnarson (ISL)	1:55.96
25.	Adrian O'Connor (IRL)	1:56.43
26.	Hugh O'Connor (IRL)	1:58.48

== See also ==
- 1996 Men's Olympic Games 200m Freestyle
- 1997 Men's World Championships (SC) 200m Freestyle
