= 1997 FINA Short Course World Championships – Men's 200m freestyle =

The finals and the qualifying heats of the men's 200 metres freestyle event at the 1997 FINA Short Course World Championships were held on the first day of the championships, on Thursday, 17 April 1997 in Gothenburg, Sweden.

== Finals ==
RANK	FINAL A	TIME
	Gustavo Borges (BRA)	1:45.45
	Trent Bray (NZL)	1:45.81
	Lars Conrad (GER)	1:46.44
4.	Michael Klim (AUS)	1:46.72
5.	Bill Kirby (AUS)	1:47.32
6.	Andrew Clayton (GBR)	1:47.71
7.	Yoav Bruck (ISR)	1:47.83
8.	Anders Lyrbring (SWE)	1:48.95

RANK	FINAL B	TIME
9.	Aimo Heilmann (GER)	1:47.31
10.	Igor Koleda (BLR)	1:47.74
11.	Fernando Saez (BRA)	1:48.16
12.	Mark Stevens (GBR)	1:48.45
13.	Nicolae Butacu (ROM)	1:48.66
14.	Dimitris Manganas (GRE)	1:49.15
15.	Petter Lindh (SWE)	1:49.17
16.	Clayton Jones (USA)	1:49.58

== Qualifying heats ==
RANK	HEATS RANKING	TIME
1.	Gustavo Borges (BRA)	1:46.94
2.	Yoav Bruck (ISR)	1:47.19
3.	Trent Bray (NZL)	1:47.25
4.	Lars Conrad (GER)	1:47.55
5.	Anders Lyrbring (SWE)	1:47.57
6.	Michael Klim (AUS)	1:47.58
7.	Andrew Clayton (GBR)	1:47.73
8.	Bill Kirby (AUS)	1:47.80
9.	Aimo Heilmann (GER)	1:47.97
10.	Jacob Carstensen (DEN)	1:48.03
11.	Fernando Saez (BRA)	1:48.48
12.	Mark Stevens (GBR)	1:48.83
13.	Nicolae Butacu (ROM)	1:48.91
14.	Petter Lindh (SWE)	1:48.93
15.	Igor Koleda (BLR)	1:48.98
16.	Clayton Jones (USA)	1:49.50
17.	Dimitris Manganas (GRE)	1:49.67
18.	Jacob Rasmussen (DEN)	1:49.73
19.	Ron Voordouw (CAN)	1:49.87
20.	Arūnas Savickas (LTU)	1:50.16
21.	Kjell Lundemoen (NOR)	1:50.26
22.	Christophe Marchand (FRA)	1:50.80
23.	Sebastien Paddington (TRI)	1:51.02
24.	Yannick Lupien (CAN)	1:51.03
25.	Torlarp Sethsothorn (THA)	1:51.06
26.	Ricardo Pedroso (POR)	1:51.21
27.	Vicha Rattanachots (THA)	1:51.44
28.	Scott Cameron (NZL)	1:51.55
29.	Masato Hirano (JPN)	1:51.59
30.	Greg Main-Baillie (RSA)	1:51.64

== See also ==
- 1996 Men's Olympic Games 200m Freestyle
- 1997 Men's European LC Championships 200m Freestyle
