= 1998 European Short Course Swimming Championships – Men's 200 metre freestyle =

The finals and the qualifying heats of the men's 200 metres freestyle event at the 1998 European Short Course Swimming Championships were held on the second day of the competition, on Saturday, 12 December 1998 in Sheffield, England.

== Finals ==
RANK	FINAL	TIME
Gold medal	Pieter van den Hoogenband (NED)	1:44.00
Silver medal	Massimiliano Rosolino (ITA)	1:44.92
Bronze medal	Jacob Carstensen (DEN)	1:45.55
4.	Lars Conrad (GER)	1:45.86
5.	Yoav Bruck (ISR)	1:46.89
6.	Michael Kiedel (GER)	1:47.11
7.	Igor Koleda (BLR)	1:47.29
8.	Sion Brinn (GBR)	1:48.75

== Qualifying Heats ==
RANK	HEATS RANKING	TIME
1.	Massimiliano Rosolino (ITA)	1:45.88
2.	Pieter van den Hoogenband (NED)	1:46.06
3.	Jacob Carstensen (DEN)	1:46.82
4.	Lars Conrad (GER)	1:46.87
5.	Michael Kiedel (GER)	1:47.12
6.	Igor Koleda (BLR)	1:47.32
7.	Sion Brinn (GBR)	1:48.00
8.	Yoav Bruck (ISR)	1:48.22
9.	Andrew Clayton (GBR)	1:48.82
10.	Ricardo Pedroso (POR)	1:49.07
10.	Vlastimil Burda (CZE)	1:49.07
12.	Marijan Kanjer (CRO)	1:49.14
13.	Maciej Kajak (POL)	1:49.16
14.	Dimitrios Manganas (GRE)	1:49.19
15.	Anders Lyrbring (SWE)	1:49.62
16.	Emiliano Brembilla (ITA)	1:49.67
17.	Květoslav Svoboda (CZE)	1:49.73
18.	Juha Lindfors (FIN)	1:49.91
19.	Tiago Lousada (POR)	1:49.94
20.	Michael Windisch (AUT)	1:50.28
21.	Lovrenco Franičević (CRO)	1:50.29
22.	Zoltán Szilágyi (HUN)	1:50.64
23.	Franck Schott (FRA)	1:51.01
24.	Philipp Gilgen (SUI)	1:51.33
25.	Frederic Tonus (BEL)	1:54.22
26.	Colin Lowth (IRL)	1:54.45
