= Swimming at the 1996 Summer Olympics – Men's 4 × 200 metre freestyle relay =

Men's 4 × 200 metre freestyle relay at the Games of the XXVI Olympiad
- Venue: Georgia Tech Aquatic Center
- Date: July 21, 1996 (heats & final)
- Competitors: 76 from 17 nations
- Teams: 17
- Winning time: 7:14.84

Medalists
1st place, gold medalist(s)		Josh Davis, Joe Hudepohl, Brad Schumacher, Ryan Berube, Jon Olsen*	United States
2nd place, silver medalist(s)		Christer Wallin, Anders Holmertz, Lars Frölander, Anders Lyrbring	Sweden
3rd place, bronze medalist(s)		Aimo Heilmann, Christian Keller, Christian Tröger, Steffen Zesner, Konstantin Dubrovin*, Oliver Lampe*; *Indicates the swimmer only competed in the preliminary heats.	Germany

The men's 4 × 200 metre freestyle relay event at the 1996 Summer Olympics took place on July 21, 1996 at the Georgia Tech Aquatic Center in Atlanta, United States.

== Records ==
Prior to this competition, the existing world and Olympic records were as follows.

World record	Unified Team; Dmitry Lepikov (1:49.55); Vladimir Pyshnenko (1:46.58); Veniamin Tayanovich (1:48.99); Yevgeny Sadovyi (1:46.83)	7:11.95	Barcelona, Spain	27 July 1992
Olympic record	Unified Team; Dmitry Lepikov (1:49.55); Vladimir Pyshnenko (1:46.58); Veniamin Tayanovich (1:48.99); Yevgeny Sadovyi (1:46.83)	7:11.95	Barcelona, Spain	27 July 1992

== Results ==
=== Heats ===
Rule: The eight fastest teams advance to the final (Q).

Rank	Heat	Lane	Nation	Swimmers	Time	Notes
1	3	4	United States	Ryan Berube (1:49.84); Joe Hudepohl (1:49.13); Brad Schumacher (1:49.48); Jon Olsen (1:49.83)	7:18.28	Q
2	3	5	Sweden	Christer Wallin (1:50.88); Lars Frölander (1:49.12); Anders Lyrbring (1:51.90); Anders Holmertz (1:48.71)	7:20.61	Q
3	1	5	Great Britain	James Salter (1:51.24); Andrew Clayton (1:49.92); Mark Stevens (1:50.32); Paul Palmer (1:50.44)	7:21.92	Q
4	1	4	Germany	Konstantin Dubrovin (1:51.68); Christian Keller (1:49.15); Oliver Lampe (1:51.39); Steffen Zesner (1:49.95)	7:22.17	Q
5	2	5	Italy	Emiliano Brembilla (1:52.21); Emanuele Idini (1:50.54); Pier Maria Siciliano (1:48.61); Massimiliano Rosolino (1:51.33)	7:22.69	Q
6	3	3	France	Yann de Fabrique (1:50.31); Lionel Poirot (1:50.30); Bruno Orsoni (1:51.74); Christophe Bordeau (1:50.63)	7:22.98	Q
7	2	4	Australia	Kieren Perkins (1:51.43); Glen Housman (1:50.40); Ian Vander-Wal (1:51.05); Malcolm Allen (1:50.36)	7:23.24	Q
8	3	6	Netherlands	Pieter van den Hoogenband (1:48.88); Tim Hoeijmans (1:51.97); Martin van der Spoel (1:51.51); Mark van der Zijden (1:51.03)	7:23.39	Q
9	2	3	New Zealand	Trent Bray (1:50.77); Murray Burdan (1:51.84); Scott Cameron (1:53.30); Danyon Loader (1:48.44)	7:24.35	
10	1	3	Brazil	Cassiano Leal (1:52.35); Luiz Lima (1:51.99); Fernando Saez (1:52.38); André Teixeira (1:52.10)	7:28.82	
11	1	2	Venezuela	Francisco Sánchez (1:52.34) NR; Carlos Santander (1:52.58); Diego Henao (1:52.57); Rafael Manzano (1:55.14)	7:32.63	NR
12	2	6	Uzbekistan	Vyacheslav Kabanov (1:53.76); Aleksandr Agafonov (1:56.44); Dmitriy Pankov (1:56.29); Oleg Tsvetkovskiy (1:54.11)	7:40.60	
13	1	6	Croatia	Gordan Kožulj (1:57.08); Miroslav Vučetić (1:53.83); Marijan Kanjer (1:53.89); Marko Strahija (1:58.89)	7:43.69	
14	3	2	South Korea	Koh Yun-ho (1:52.77) NR; Lee Kyu-chang (1:56.84); Woo Chul (1:57.32); Kim Min-suk (1:59.05)	7:45.98	NR
15	3	7	Singapore	Sng Ju Wei (1:55.49); Gerald Koh (2:00.59); Desmond Koh (1:59.41); Thum Ping Tjin (1:58.70)	7:54.19	
16	2	7	Ecuador	Roberto Delgado (1:57.86); Julio Santos (1:56.60); Javier Santos (1:59.79); Andrés Vasconcellos (2:00.12)	7:54.37	
17	2	2	Kyrgyzstan	Sergey Ashihmin (2:03.05); Andrey Kvassov (1:53.91); Dmitry Lapin (1:56.01); Vitaly Vasilyev (2:07.03)	8:00.00	NR

=== Final ===
Rank	Lane	Nation	Swimmers	Time	Notes
1st place, gold medalist(s)	4	United States	Josh Davis (1:48.19); Joe Hudepohl (1:49.29); Brad Schumacher (1:48.89); Ryan Berube (1:48.47)	7:14.84	
2nd place, silver medalist(s)	5	Sweden	Christer Wallin (1:50.47); Anders Holmertz (1:47.03); Lars Frölander (1:48.98); Anders Lyrbring (1:51.08)	7:17.56	
3rd place, bronze medalist(s)	6	Germany	Aimo Heilmann (1:49.31); Christian Keller (1:49.50); Christian Tröger (1:49.80); Steffen Zesner (1:49.10)	7:17.71	
4	1	Australia	Daniel Kowalski (1:49.42); Michael Klim (1:48.04); Malcolm Allen (1:50.77); Matthew Dunn (1:50.24)	7:18.47	
5	3	Great Britain	Paul Palmer (1:49.19); Andrew Clayton (1:49.84); Mark Stevens (1:50.42); James Salter (1:49.29)	7:18.74	
6	2	Italy	Massimiliano Rosolino (1:49.22); Emanuele Idini (1:50.36); Emanuele Merisi (1:51.14); Pier Maria Siciliano (1:49.20)	7:19.92	
7	8	Netherlands	Marcel Wouda (1:49.89); Mark van der Zijden (1:50.77); Martin van der Spoel (1:52.05); Pieter van den Hoogenband (1:49.25)	7:21.96	NR
8	7	France	Yann de Fabrique (1:50.76); Lionel Poirot (1:50.74); Bruno Orsoni (1:51.97); Christophe Bordeau (1:51.38)	7:24.85	
