= Swimming at the 2000 Summer Olympics – Men's 200 metre freestyle =

Men's 200 metre freestyle at the Games of the XXVII Olympiad
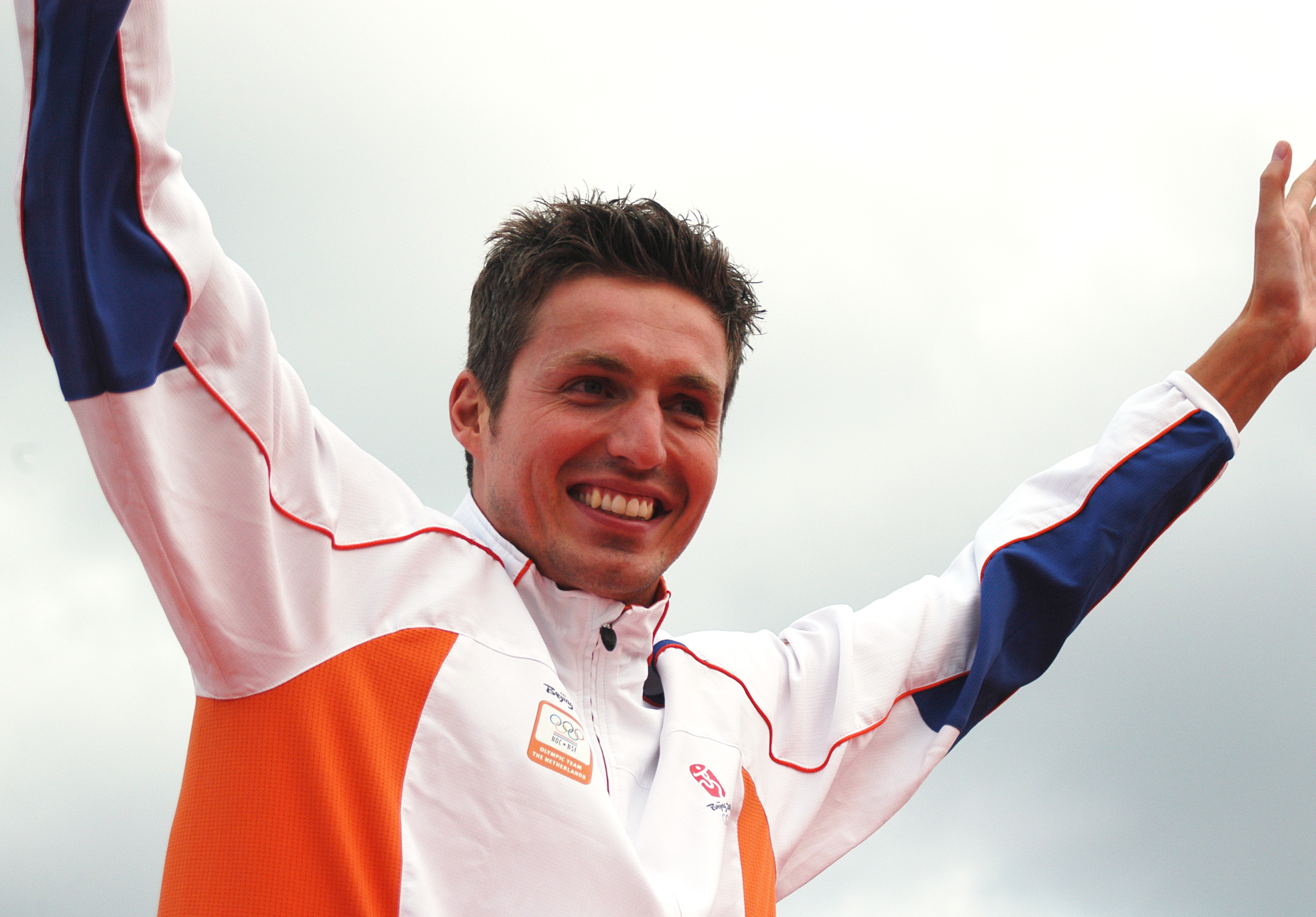
- Gold medalist Pieter van den Hoogenband (2008)
- Venue: Sydney International Aquatic Centre
- Dates: September 17, 2000 (heats & semifinals); September 18, 2000 (final)
- Competitors: 51 from 44 nations
- Winning time: 1:45.35 =WR

Medalists
1st place, gold medalist(s)		Pieter van den Hoogenband; Netherlands
2nd place, silver medalist(s)		Ian Thorpe; Australia
3rd place, bronze medalist(s)		Massimiliano Rosolino; Italy

The men's 200 metre freestyle event at the 2000 Summer Olympics took place on 17–18 September at the Sydney International Aquatic Centre in Sydney, Australia. There were 51 competitors from 44 nations, with each nation having up to two swimmers (a limit in place since 1984).

Dutchman Pieter van den Hoogenband edged out Australia's top favorite Ian Thorpe on the final lap to claim a gold medal in the event. Stunning a massive home crowd, he touched the wall first in 1:45.35 to match his own world record from the semifinals. As a result of starting harder than usual, Thorpe ended up only with a silver in 1:45.83, while Italy's Massimiliano Rosolino added a bronze to his hardware from the 400 m freestyle in a time 1:46.65. The medals were the first in the men's 200 metre freestyle for both the Netherlands and Italy.

U.S. swimmer Josh Davis missed the podium by eight hundredths of a second (0.08), finishing with a new American record of 1:46.73. Davis was followed in fifth and sixth by British duo Paul Palmer (1:47.95) and James Salter (1:48.74). Canada's Rick Say (1:48.76) and another Aussie Grant Hackett (1:49.46) closed out the field.

Earlier in the semifinals, Van den Hoogenband blasted a new world record of 1:45.35, slashing 0.16 seconds off the mark set by Thorpe from the Australian trials. One heat later, Thorpe powered home with a second-fastest time of 1:45.37, but missed taking the record back by two hundredths of a second (0.02). He also erased Yevgeny Sadovyi's 1992 Olympic record by 0.14 seconds to pick up a top seed from the prelims (1:46.56).

The medals for the competition were presented by Mohammed Mzali, IOC Member, Tunisia; and the medalists' bouquets were presented by Roger Smith, FINA Vice President; Australia.

== Background ==
This was the 11th appearance of the 200 metre freestyle event. It was first contested in 1900. It would be contested a second time, though at 220 yards, in 1904. After that, the event did not return until 1968; since then, it has been on the programme at every Summer Games.

Four of the 8 finalists from the 1996 Games returned: fourth-place finisher Pieter van den Hoogenband of the Netherlands, sixth-place finisher Massimiliano Rosolino of Italy, seventh-place finisher Josh Davis of the United States, and eighth-place finisher Paul Palmer of Great Britain. Rosolino had taken silver at the 1998 World Championships, with van den Hoogenband bronze. Australia's Michael Klim had won those World Championships, but the Australian team in Sydney was Grant Hackett and world record holder and home country favourite Ian Thorpe.

Andorra, Belarus, Cyprus, the Czech Republic, India, Lithuania, and Trinidad and Tobago each made their debut in the event. Australia made its 11th appearance, the only nation to have competed in all prior editions of the event.

== Competition format ==
The competition altered the format that had been used since 1984. The tournament expanded to three rounds: heats, semifinals, and a final. The advancement rule followed the format introduced in 1952. A swimmer's place in the heat was not used to determine advancement; instead, the fastest times from across all heats in a round were used. Instead of having the top 16 swimmers divided into a Final A for the top 8 and Final B for 9th through 16th, as was done in from 1984 to 1996, the 2000 competition added semifinals. The top 16 swimmers from the heats competed in the new semifinals. The top 8 semifinalists advanced to the final (there was no longer a classification final for 9th through 16th). Swim-offs were used as necessary to break ties.

This swimming event used freestyle swimming, which means that the method of the stroke is not regulated (unlike backstroke, breaststroke, and butterfly events). Nearly all swimmers use the front crawl or a variant of that stroke. Because an Olympic-size swimming pool is 50 metres long, this race consisted of four lengths of the pool.

== Records ==
Prior to this competition, the existing world and Olympic records were as follows.

World record	Ian Thorpe (AUS)	1:45.51	Sydney, Australia	15 May 2000
Olympic record	Yevgeny Sadovyi (EUN)	1:46.70	Barcelona, Spain	27 July 1992

The following new world and Olympic records were set during this competition.

Date	Event	Swimmer	Nation	Time	Record
17 September	Heat 7	Ian Thorpe	Australia	1:46.56	OR
17 September	Semifinal 1	Pieter van den Hoogenband	Netherlands	1:45.35	WR
18 September	Final	Pieter van den Hoogenband	Netherlands	1:45.35	=WR

== Schedule ==
All times are Australian Eastern Standard Time (UTC+10)

Date	Time	Round
Sunday, 17 September 2000	10:25; 19:14	Heats; Semifinals
Monday, 18 September 2000	19:11	Final

== Results ==
=== Heats ===
The top 16 across all heats advanced to the semifinals.

Rank	Heat	Lane	Swimmer	Nation	Time	Notes
1	7	4	Ian Thorpe	Australia	1:46.56	Q, OR
2	6	4	Pieter van den Hoogenband	Netherlands	1:46.71	Q
3	7	5	Massimiliano Rosolino	Italy	1:47.37	Q
4	5	4	Josh Davis	United States	1:48.43	Q
5	7	6	Rick Say	Canada	1:48.62	Q
6	5	3	James Salter	Great Britain	1:48.77	Q
7	6	2	Igor Koleda	Belarus	1:49.01	Q, NR
8	7	3	Scott Goldblatt	United States	1:49.05	Q
9	6	5	Grant Hackett	Australia	1:49.23	Q
10	5	8	Örn Arnarson	Iceland	1:49.78	Q, NR
11	5	5	Paul Palmer	Great Britain	1:49.83	Q
12	5	7	Stefan Herbst	Germany	1:49.84	Q
13	7	2	Andrey Kapralov	Russia	1:49.92	Q
14	6	7	Stefan Pohl	Germany	1:50.07	Q
15	6	6	Béla Szabados	Hungary	1:50.10	Q
16	5	1	Attila Zubor	Hungary	1:50.11	Q
17	7	8	Dragoş Coman	Romania	1:50.20	
18	7	1	Květoslav Svoboda	Czech Republic	1:50.29	
19	6	8	Martijn Zuijdweg	Netherlands	1:50.37	
20	5	6	Jacob Carstensen	Denmark	1:50.41	
21	5	2	Mark Johnston	Canada	1:50.92	
22	4	5	Arūnas Savickas	Lithuania	1:52.02	
23	2	5	Mark Chay	Singapore	1:52.22	NR
24	4	7	Rostyslav Svanidze	Ukraine	1:52.35	
25	4	6	Ricardo Pedroso	Portugal	1:52.60	
26	4	1	Mark Kwok Kin Ming	Hong Kong	1:52.71	
27	3	5	Damian Alleyne	Barbados	1:52.75	
28	4	4	Dmitri Kuzmin	Kyrgyzstan	1:52.93	NR
29	3	2	Woo Chul	South Korea	1:53.02	
30	3	3	Javier Díaz	Mexico	1:53.20	
31	4	3	Andrei Cecan	Moldova	1:53.23	
32	3	1	Jonathan Duncan	New Zealand	1:53.27	
33	4	2	Rodrigo Castro	Brazil	1:53.65	
34	3	4	Fernando Jácome	Colombia	1:54.17	
35	3	7	Francisco Paez	Venezuela	1:54.32	
36	6	3	Dimitrios Manganas	Greece	1:54.36	
37	2	2	Allen Ong	Malaysia	1:54.53	
38	3	8	Wu Nien-pin	Chinese Taipei	1:54.58	
39	2	7	George Gleason	Virgin Islands	1:54.64	
40	4	8	Glen Walshaw	Zimbabwe	1:54.70	NR
41	2	3	Nikola Kalabić	FR Yugoslavia	1:54.75	
42	2	8	Aytekin Mindan	Turkey	1:54.86	
43	3	6	Vicha Ratanachote	Thailand	1:54.91	
44	1	3	Oleg Tsvetkovskiy	Uzbekistan	1:54.93	
45	2	1	Carl Probert	Fiji	1:54.98	
46	1	5	Mahmoud El-Wany	Egypt	1:55.19	
47	1	4	Sebastien Paddington	Trinidad and Tobago	1:55.40	
48	2	4	Andrey Kvassov	Kazakhstan	1:55.72	
49	2	6	Alexandros Aresti	Cyprus	1:57.54	
50	1	6	Hakimuddin Shabbir Habibulla	India	1:58.35	
51	1	2	Santiago Deu	Andorra	1:59.31	
—	6	3	Ryk Neethling	South Africa	DNS	
—	7	7	Dmitry Chernyshov	Russia	DNS	

=== Semifinals ===
Rank	Heat	Lane	Swimmer	Nation	Time	Notes
1	1	4	Pieter van den Hoogenband	Netherlands	1:45.35	Q, WR
2	2	4	Ian Thorpe	Australia	1:45.37	Q, OC
3	2	5	Massimiliano Rosolino	Italy	1:46.60	Q, NR
4	1	5	Josh Davis	United States	1:47.06	Q, AM
5	2	3	Rick Say	Canada	1:48.50	Q
6	1	3	James Salter	Great Britain	1:48.64	Q
7	2	2	Grant Hackett	Australia	1:48.76	Q
8	2	7	Paul Palmer	Great Britain	1:48.79	Q
9	1	6	Scott Goldblatt	United States	1:48.83	
10	2	1	Andrey Kapralov	Russia	1:49.04	
11	2	8	Béla Szabados	Hungary	1:49.36	
12	2	6	Igor Koleda	Belarus	1:49.52	
13	1	7	Stefan Herbst	Germany	1:49.72	
14	1	8	Attila Zubor	Hungary	1:49.87	
15	1	2	Örn Arnarson	Iceland	1:50.41	
16	1	1	Stefan Pohl	Germany	1:50.56	

=== Final ===
Rank	Lane	Swimmer	Nation	Time	Notes
1st place, gold medalist(s)	4	Pieter van den Hoogenband	Netherlands	1:45.35	=WR
2nd place, silver medalist(s)	5	Ian Thorpe	Australia	1:45.83	
3rd place, bronze medalist(s)	3	Massimiliano Rosolino	Italy	1:46.65	
4	6	Josh Davis	United States	1:46.73	AM
5	8	Paul Palmer	Great Britain	1:47.95	
6	7	James Salter	Great Britain	1:48.74	
7	2	Rick Say	Canada	1:48.76	
8	1	Grant Hackett	Australia	1:49.46	
