= Swimming at the 1995 European Aquatics Championships – Men's 400 metre freestyle =

The qualifying heats and the finals of the Men's 400 metres Freestyle event at the European LC Championships 1995 were held on Friday 25 August 1995 in Vienna, Austria.

== Finals ==
RANK	FINAL A	TIME
	Stefan Zessner (GER)	3:50.35
	Paul Palmer (GBR)	3:50.43
	Anders Holmertz (SWE)	3:51.01
4.	Pier Maria Siciliano (ITA)	3.52.70
5.	Alexei Stepanov (RUS)	3:52.91
6.	Jörg Hoffmann (GER)	3:53.22
7.	Alessandro Berti (ITA)	3:57.86
8.	Chris Eliasson (SWE)	3:58.46

RANK	FINAL B	TIME
9.	Jure Bučar (SLO)	3:58.20
10.	Roland Brunner (AUT)	3:58.77
11.	Nace Majcen (SLO)	3:59.75
12.	Lionel Rioual (FRA)	3:59.86
13.	Can Ergenekan (TUR)	4:00.08
14.	Miroslav Vučetić (CRO)	4:01.28
15.	Manolis Lenteris (GRE)	4:04.19
16.	Tom Stoltz (LUX)	4:04.89

== See also ==
- 1993 Men's European Championships (LC) 400m Freestyle
- 1995 Men's World Championships (SC) 400m Freestyle
- 1996 Men's Olympic Games 400m Freestyle
- 1997 Men's European Championships (LC) 400m Freestyle
