= 1997 FINA Short Course World Championships – Men's 400m freestyle =

The finals and the qualifying heats of the men's 400 metres freestyle event at the 1997 FINA Short Course World Championships were held on the second day of the competition, on Friday 18 April 1997 in Gothenburg, Sweden.

== Finals ==
RANK	FINAL A	TIME
	Jacob Carstensen (DEN)	3:43.44
	Chad Carvin (USA)	3:43.73
	Grant Hackett (AUS)	3:43.83
4.	Paul Palmer (GBR)	3:43.90
5.	Jörg Hoffmann (GER)	3:43.93
6.	Dimitris Manganas (GRE)	3:48.76
7.	Graeme Smith (GBR)	3:51.56
8.	Luiz Lima (BRA)	3:51.80

RANK	FINAL B	TIME
9.	Igor Koleda (BLR)	3:49.15
10.	Mark Johnston (CAN)	3:49.95
11.	Masato Hirano (JPN)	3:50.74
12.	Ron Voordouw (CAN)	3:50.83
12.	Torlarp Sethsothorn (THA)	3:50.83
14.	Bill Kirby (AUS)	3:51.64
15.	Fernando Saez (BRA)	3:52.11
16.	Jonas Lundström (SWE)	3:53.31

== Qualifying heats ==
RANK	HEATS RANKING	TIME
1.	Jörg Hoffmann (GER)	3:46.20
2.	Jacob Carstensen (DEN)	3:46.78
3.	Grant Hackett (AUS)	3:47.06
4.	Dimitris Manganas (GRE)	3:47.57
5.	Chad Carvin (USA)	3:48.14
6.	Paul Palmer (GBR)	3:48.60
7.	Graeme Smith (GBR)	3:49.98
8.	Luiz Lima (BRA)	3:50.09
9.	Masato Hirano (JPN)	3:50.33
10.	Bill Kirby (AUS)	3:50.67
11.	Mark Johnston (CAN)	3:50.68
12.	Ron Voordouw (CAN)	3:51.69
13.	Igor Koleda (BLR)	3:51.81
14.	Torlarp Sethsothorn (THA)	3:52.01
15.	Jonas Lundström (SWE)	3:52.15
16.	Fernando Saez (BRA)	3:52.61
17.	Adrian Andermatt (SUI)	3:53.90
18.	Trent Bray (NZL)	3:53.96
19.	Alejandro Bermúdez (COL)	3:54.09
20.	Scott Cameron (NZL)	3:54.46
21.	Ricardo Monasterio (VEN)	3:55.44
22.	Fausto Mauri (SUI)	3:56.91
23.	Sandro Tomaš (CRO)	3:57.06
24.	Ricardo Pedroso (POR)	3:57.23
25.	Toshiaki Kurasawa (JPN)	3:57.41
26.	Ryno Markgraaff (RSA)	3:57.84
27.	Christophe Marchand (FRA)	3:57.88
28.	Rafael Manzano (VEN)	3:58.00
29.	Pedro Silva (POR)	3:58.24
30.	Milan Malena (CZE)	3:59.87

== See also ==
- 1996 Men's Olympic Games 400m Freestyle
- 1997 Men's European LC Championships 400m Freestyle
