= Swimming at the 1996 Summer Olympics – Men's 400 metre freestyle =

Men's 400 metre freestyle at the Games of the XXVI Olympiad
- Venue: Georgia Tech Aquatic Center
- Date: 23 July 1996 (heats & finals)
- Competitors: 35 from 31 nations
- Winning time: 3:47.97 NR

Medalists
1st place, gold medalist(s)		Danyon Loader	New Zealand
2nd place, silver medalist(s)		Paul Palmer	Great Britain
3rd place, bronze medalist(s)		Daniel Kowalski	Australia

The men's 400 metre freestyle event at the 1996 Summer Olympics took place on 23 July at the Georgia Tech Aquatic Center in Atlanta, United States.

== Records ==
Prior to this competition, the existing world and Olympic records were as follows.

World record	Kieren Perkins (AUS)	3:43.80	Rome, Italy	11 September 1994
Olympic record	Yevgeny Sadovyi (EUN)	3:45.00	Barcelona, Spain	29 July 1992

== Results ==
=== Heats ===
Rule: The eight fastest swimmers advance to final A (Q), while the next eight to final B (q).

Rank	Heat	Lane	Name	Nationality	Time	Notes
1	4	6	Emiliano Brembilla	Italy	3:49.35	Q
2	4	5	Massimiliano Rosolino	Italy	3:51.05	Q
3	4	3	Jörg Hoffmann	Germany	3:51.26	Q
4	5	5	Danyon Loader	New Zealand	3:51.54	Q
5	3	4	Daniel Kowalski	Australia	3:51.67	Q
6	5	3	Paul Palmer	Great Britain	3:51.98	Q
7	3	5	Anders Holmertz	Sweden	3:52.27	Q
8	5	2	Jacob Carstensen	Denmark	3:52.62	Q
9	3	3	Sebastian Wiese	Germany	3:53.55	q
10	4	4	John Piersma	United States	3:53.58	q
11	5	4	Tom Dolan	United States	3:53.91	q, WD
12	5	6	Malcolm Allen	Australia	3:54.34	q
13	3	2	Dimitrios Manganas	Greece	3:54.85	q, NR
14	4	7	Yann de Fabrique	France	3:55.42	q
15	5	8	Igor Snitko	Ukraine	3:55.67	q, NR
16	5	7	Ryk Neethling	South Africa	3:56.19	q
17	3	6	Aleksey Akatyev	Russia	3:56.40	q
18	3	7	Luiz Lima	Brazil	3:56.43	
19	4	1	Torlarp Sethsothorn	Thailand	3:57.08	NR
20	3	1	Jure Bučar	Slovenia	3:57.36	
21	2	1	Alejandro Bermúdez	Colombia	3:57.45	NR
22	2	4	Miroslav Vučetić	Croatia	3:59.20	
23	4	2	Béla Szabados	Hungary	3:59.36	
24	5	1	Hisato Yasui	Japan	4:00.19	
25	2	7	Ricardo Monasterio	Venezuela	4:00.44	
26	1	4	Andrey Kvassov	Kyrgyzstan	4:00.69	NR
27	2	5	Can Ergenekan	Turkey	4:02.39	
28	1	5	Agustín Fiorilli	Argentina	4:02.53	
29	2	6	Mark Kwok Kin Ming	Hong Kong	4:02.68	
30	3	8	Woo Chul	South Korea	4:03.11	
31	2	2	Andrei Zaharov	Moldova	4:09.30	
32	4	8	Hisham Al-Masri	Syria	4:10.23	
33	2	8	Sng Ju Wei	Singapore	4:12.24	
34	1	3	Omar Dallal	Jordan	4:41.12	
	2	3	Antti Kasvio	Finland	DNS	

=== Finals ===
==== Final B ====
Rank	Lane	Name	Nationality	Time	Notes
9	5	John Piersma	United States	3:50.69	
10	4	Sebastian Wiese	Germany	3:52.37	
11	1	Ryk Neethling	South Africa	3:54.34	
12	7	Igor Snitko	Ukraine	3:54.63	NR
13	3	Malcolm Allen	Australia	3:55.48	
14	8	Aleksey Akatyev	Russia	3:55.72	
15	2	Yann de Fabrique	France	3:56.46	
16	6	Dimitrios Manganas	Greece	3:57.39	

==== Final A ====
Rank	Lane	Name	Nationality	Time	Notes
1st place, gold medalist(s)	6	Danyon Loader	New Zealand	3:47.97	NR
2nd place, silver medalist(s)	7	Paul Palmer	Great Britain	3:49.00	
3rd place, bronze medalist(s)	2	Daniel Kowalski	Australia	3:49.39	
4	4	Emiliano Brembilla	Italy	3:49.87	
5	1	Anders Holmertz	Sweden	3:50.66	
6	5	Massimiliano Rosolino	Italy	3:51.04	
7	3	Jörg Hoffmann	Germany	3:52.15	
8	8	Jacob Carstensen	Denmark	3:54.45	
