= Swimming at the 1996 Summer Olympics – Men's 200 metre freestyle =

Men's 200 metre freestyle at the Games of the XXVI Olympiad
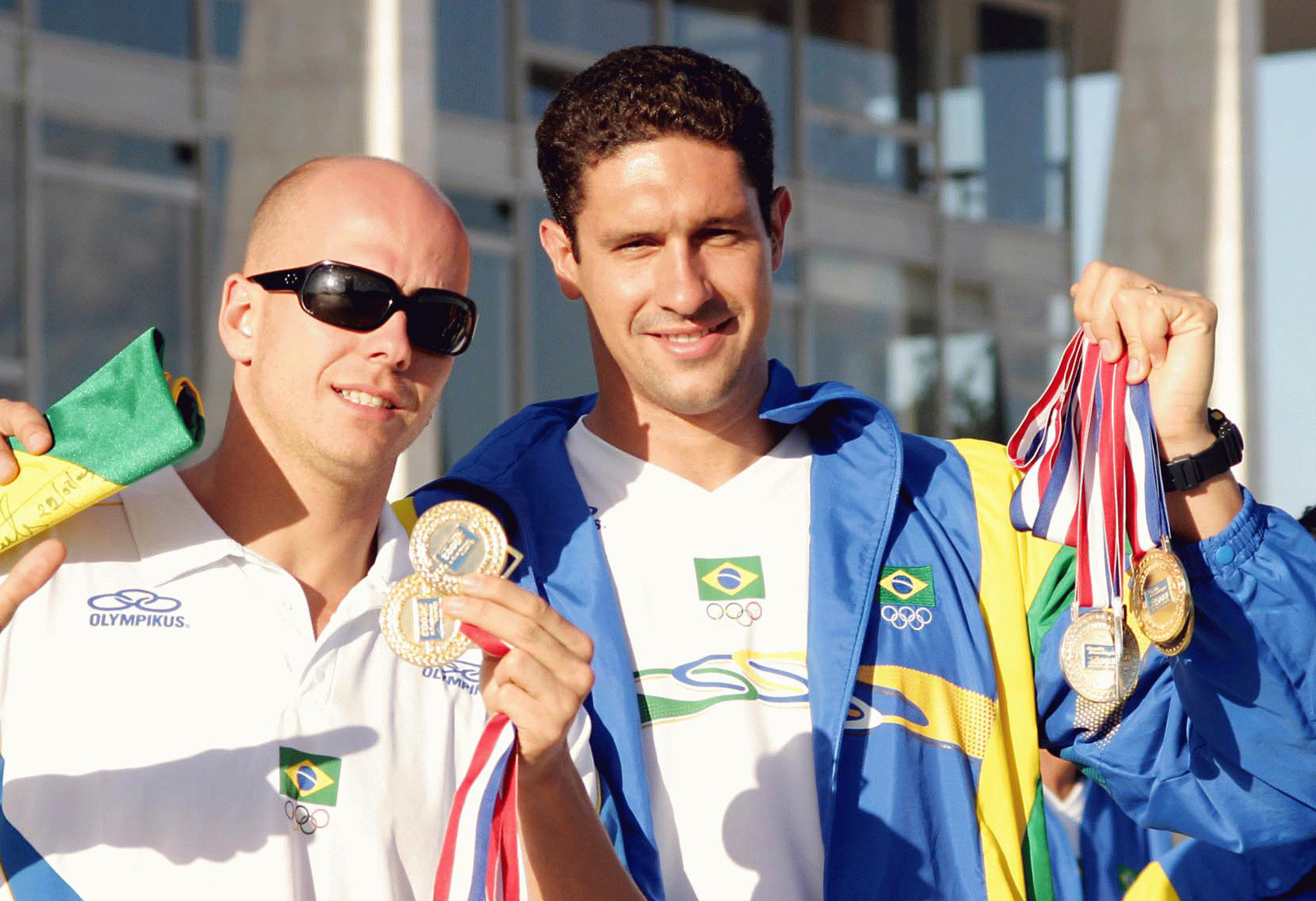
- Silver medalist Gustavo Borges (right) (2003)
- Venue: Georgia Tech Aquatic Center
- Date: 20 July 1996 (heats & finals)
- Competitors: 43 from 36 nations
- Winning time: 1:47.63

Medalists
1st place, gold medalist(s)		Danyon Loader	New Zealand
2nd place, silver medalist(s)		Gustavo Borges	Brazil
3rd place, bronze medalist(s)		Daniel Kowalski	Australia

The men's 200 metre freestyle event at the 1996 Summer Olympics took place on 20 July at the Georgia Tech Aquatic Center in Atlanta, United States. There were 43 competitors from 36 nations, with each nation having up to two swimmers (a limit in place since 1984). The event was won by Danyon Loader of New Zealand, the nation's first medal in the men's 200 metre freestyle. Brazil also received its first medal in the event, with Gustavo Borges taking silver. Bronze went to Australia's Daniel Kowalski.

== Background ==
This was the 10th appearance of the 200 metre freestyle event. It was first contested in 1900. It would be contested a second time, though at 220 yards, in 1904. After that, the event did not return until 1968; since then, it has been on the programme at every Summer Games.

Three of the 8 finalists from the 1992 Games returned: two-time silver medalist Anders Holmertz of Sweden, bronze medalist Antti Kasvio of Finland, and fifth-place finisher Vladimir Pyshnenko of the Unified Team (now competing for Russia). At the 1994 World Aquatics Championships, Kasvio (gold), Holmertz (silver), and Danyon Loader of New Zealand (bronze) had been on the podium. They were among about 10 swimmers considered to have a chance at the gold medal in a relatively open field.

Croatia, Kazakhstan, Kyrgyzstan, Moldova, Russia, Thailand, Ukraine, and Uzbekistan each made their debut in the event. Australia made its 10th appearance, the only nation to have competed in all prior editions of the event.

== Competition format ==
The competition used a two-round (heats, final) format. The advancement rule followed the format introduced in 1952. A swimmer's place in the heat was not used to determine advancement; instead, the fastest times from across all heats in a round were used. There were 8 heats of up to 8 swimmers each. The top 8 swimmers advanced to the final. The 1984 event had also introduced a consolation or "B" final; the swimmers placing 9th through 16th in the heats competed in this "B" final for placing. Swim-offs were used as necessary to break ties.

This swimming event used freestyle swimming, which means that the method of the stroke is not regulated (unlike backstroke, breaststroke, and butterfly events). Nearly all swimmers use the front crawl or a variant of that stroke. Because an Olympic-size swimming pool is 50 metres long, this race consisted of four lengths of the pool.

== Records ==
Prior to this competition, the existing world and Olympic records were as follows.

World record	Giorgio Lamberti (ITA)	1:46.69	Bonn, West Germany	15 August 1989
Olympic record	Yevgeny Sadovyi (EUN)	1:46.70	Barcelona, Spain	27 July 1992

No new world or Olympic records were set during the competition.

== Schedule ==
All times are Eastern Daylight Time (UTC-4)

Date	Time	Round
Saturday, 20 July 1996	20:50	Heats; Finals

== Results ==
=== Heats ===
Rule: The eight fastest swimmers advance to final A, while the next eight to final B.

Rank	Heat	Lane	Swimmer	Nation	Time	Notes
1	5	3	Anders Holmertz	Sweden	1:48.41	QA
2	4	4	Danyon Loader	New Zealand	1:48.48	QA
3	5	4	Josh Davis	United States	1:48.63	QA
4	6	5	Pieter van den Hoogenband	Netherlands	1:48.68	QA
5	5	2	Massimiliano Rosolino	Italy	1:48.80	QA
6	6	3	Daniel Kowalski	Australia	1:48.92	QA
7	4	1	Gustavo Borges	Brazil	1:49.00	QA
8	4	2	Paul Palmer	Great Britain	1:49.05	QSO
8	4	5	Jani Sievinen	Finland	1:49.05	QSO
10	6	4	Michael Klim	Australia	1:49.17	QB
11	4	7	Aimo Heilmann	Germany	1:49.57	QB
12	4	6	Vladimir Pyshnenko	Russia	1:49.79	QB
13	5	6	Pier Maria Siciliano	Italy	1:49.88	QB
14	6	6	Antti Kasvio	Finland	1:50.55	QB, WD
15	5	5	John Piersma	United States	1:50.59	QB
16	6	1	Jacob Carstensen	Denmark	1:50.79	QB
17	4	8	Nicolae Butacu	Romania	1:50.83	QB
18	6	7	Andrew Clayton	Great Britain	1:51.06	QB
19	3	3	Miroslav Vučetić	Croatia	1:51.26	NR
20	4	3	Attila Czene	Hungary	1:51.59	
20	6	2	Trent Bray	New Zealand	1:51.59	
22	6	8	Aleksey Yegorov	Kazakhstan	1:51.66	
23	5	8	Shunsuke Ito	Japan	1:51.97	
24	5	1	Christophe Bordeau	France	1:52.17	
25	5	7	Miklós Kollár	Hungary	1:52.19	
26	3	1	Koh Yun-ho	South Korea	1:52.80	NR
27	1	4	Carlos Santander	Venezuela	1:53.13	NR
28	3	7	Vyacheslav Kabanov	Uzbekistan	1:53.36	
29	3	5	Earl McCarthy	Ireland	1:53.67	
30	3	4	Dimitrios Manganas	Greece	1:53.84	
31	3	6	Salim Iles	Algeria	1:54.10	NR
32	2	6	José Isaza	Panama	1:54.58	
33	3	8	Torlarp Sethsothorn	Thailand	1:54.73	
34	2	3	Jure Bučar	Slovenia	1:54.75	
35	2	1	Raymond Papa	Philippines	1:54.77	
36	2	4	Bartosz Sikora	Poland	1:55.33	
37	2	5	Sng Ju Wei	Singapore	1:55.51	
38	2	2	Dmitry Lapin	Kyrgyzstan	1:55.52	
39	1	3	Carl Probert	Fiji	1:56.33	
40	2	8	Felipe Delgado	Ecuador	1:55.52	
41	3	2	Andrei Zaharov	Moldova	1:57.47	
42	2	7	Denys Zavhorodnyy	Ukraine	1:58.67	
43	1	5	Thamer Al-Shamroukh	Kuwait	2:13.75	

=== Swimoff ===
Palmer and Sievinen, who had tied for 8th place in the heats to require the swimoff, tied again in the swimoff. This would have resulted in a second swimoff between the pair, but Sievinen elected to withdraw from the race, allowing the former to advance to the final A by default. Because Sievinen scratched out from the competition, the vacant spot in Final B was distributed to the next best-ranked swimmer, not yet qualified, in the heats.

Rank	Lane	Swimmer	Nation	Time	Notes
1	5	Paul Palmer	Great Britain	1:48.89	QSO, QA
1	4	Jani Sievinen	Finland	1:48.89	QSO, WD

=== Finals ===
There were two finals, one for the top 8 swimmers and one for the next 8 (9th through 16th).

==== Final B ====
Rank	Lane	Swimmer	Nation	Time	Notes
9	5	Aimo Heilmann	Germany	1:48.81	
10	4	Michael Klim	Australia	1:49.50	
11	3	Vladimir Pyshnenko	Russia	1:49.55	
12	2	John Piersma	United States	1:49.90	
13	6	Pier Maria Siciliano	Italy	1:50.07	
14	7	Jacob Carstensen	Denmark	1:50.54	
15	8	Andrew Clayton	Great Britain	1:50.59	
16	1	Nicolae Butacu	Romania	1:51.46	

==== Final A ====
Rank	Lane	Swimmer	Nation	Time	Notes
1st place, gold medalist(s)	5	Danyon Loader	New Zealand	1:47.63	NR
2nd place, silver medalist(s)	1	Gustavo Borges	Brazil	1:48.08	SA
3rd place, bronze medalist(s)	7	Daniel Kowalski	Australia	1:48.25	
4	6	Pieter van den Hoogenband	Netherlands	1:48.36	NR
5	4	Anders Holmertz	Sweden	1:48.42	
6	2	Massimiliano Rosolino	Italy	1:48.50	
7	3	Josh Davis	United States	1:48.54	
8	8	Paul Palmer	Great Britain	1:49.39	
