= Swimming at the 2000 Summer Olympics – Men's 400 metre freestyle =

Men's 400 metre freestyle at the Games of the XXVII Olympiad
- Venue: Sydney International Aquatic Centre
- Date: September 16, 2000 (heats & final)
- Competitors: 46 from 40 nations
- Winning time: 3:40.59 WR

Medalists
1st place, gold medalist(s)		Ian Thorpe	Australia
2nd place, silver medalist(s)		Massimiliano Rosolino	Italy
3rd place, bronze medalist(s)		Klete Keller	United States

The men's 400 metre freestyle event at the 2000 Summer Olympics took place on 16 September at the Sydney International Aquatic Centre in Sydney, Australia.

At just 17 years old, Australia's top favorite Ian Thorpe—nicknamed the "Thorpedo"—made his Olympic debut by securing the host nation's first gold medal of the Games, winning by 2.81 seconds. Energized by a roaring home crowd and chants of "Thorpie," he led from start to finish, touching the wall first with a new world record time of 3:40.59.

Massimiliano Rosolino earned a silver medal for Italy in a European record of 3:43.40, finishing almost three seconds behind Thorpe. Meanwhile, U.S. swimmer Klete Keller (another 17-year-old) stormed home from last place in the 200 m lap to wrest a bronze in 3:47.00, an American record, edging out Rosolino's teammate Emiliano Brembilla (3:47.01) by a hundredth of a second (0.01).

Romania's Dragoș Coman finished fifth with a national record of 3:47.38, and was followed in the sixth spot by another U.S. swimmer Chad Carvin in 3:47.58. Aussie Grant Hackett (3:48.22) and South Africa's Ryk Neethling (3:48.52) rounded out the finale within three-tenths of a second (0.30) apart. Acknowledging a massive roar of the home crowd, Thorpe also cracked Yevgeny Sadovyi's 1992 Olympic record by 0.35 seconds to lead the final of six heats, and pick up a top-seeded time of 3:44.65 in the morning prelims.

== Records ==
Prior to this competition, the existing world and Olympic records were as follows.

World record	Ian Thorpe (AUS)	3:41.33	Sydney, Australia	13 May 2000
Olympic record	Yevgeny Sadovyi (EUN)	3:45.00	Barcelona, Spain	29 July 1992

The following new world and Olympic records were set during this competition.

Date	Event	Name	Nationality	Time	Record
16 September	Heat 6	Ian Thorpe	Australia	3:44.65	OR
16 September	Final	Ian Thorpe	Australia	3:40.59	WR

== Results ==
=== Heats ===
Rank	Heat	Lane	Name	Nationality	Time	Notes
1	6	4	Ian Thorpe	Australia	3:44.65	Q, OR
2	4	3	Massimiliano Rosolino	Italy	3:45.65	Q, NR
3	4	4	Ryk Neethling	South Africa	3:48.08	Q
4	6	3	Emiliano Brembilla	Italy	3:48.41	Q
5	5	5	Chad Carvin	United States	3:48.42	Q
6	6	5	Klete Keller	United States	3:48.62	Q
7	5	3	Dragoș Coman	Romania	3:48.77	Q, NR
8	5	4	Grant Hackett	Australia	3:48.91	Q
9	5	2	Heiko Hell	Germany	3:50.80	
10	4	5	Paul Palmer	Great Britain	3:51.06	
11	4	1	Masato Hirano	Japan	3:51.42	AS
12	6	8	Nicolas Rostoucher	France	3:51.80	NR
13	5	6	James Salter	Great Britain	3:52.01	
14	6	7	Alexei Filipets	Russia	3:52.21	
15	6	6	Rick Say	Canada	3:52.72	
16	4	7	Igor Snitko	Ukraine	3:52.97	
17	4	2	Luiz Lima	Brazil	3:53.87	
18	4	6	Jacob Carstensen	Denmark	3:54.14	
19	5	7	Vlastimil Burda	Czech Republic	3:54.40	
20	5	8	Spyridon Gianniotis	Greece	3:54.96	
21	6	2	Mark Johnston	Canada	3:54.99	
22	4	8	Dmitry Koptur	Belarus	3:55.26	
23	5	1	Ricardo Monasterio	Venezuela	3:55.35	
24	3	6	Torwai Sethsothorn	Thailand	3:56.68	
25	3	3	Jin Hao	China	3:57.22	
26	3	8	Damian Alleyne	Barbados	3:58.12	
27	2	4	Woo Chul	South Korea	3:58.31	
28	3	5	Jorge Carral Armella	Mexico	3:58.34	
29	3	4	Jonathan Duncan	New Zealand	3:58.52	
30	2	2	Mark Kwok Kin Ming	Hong Kong	3:58.94	NR
31	3	2	Zoltán Szilágyi	Hungary	3:59.40	
32	2	5	Agustín Fiorilli	Argentina	3:59.44	
33	6	1	Igor Chervynskiy	Ukraine	3:59.84	
34	2	3	Petar Stoychev	Bulgaria	3:59.94	
35	3	7	Jure Bučar	Slovenia	4:00.19	
36	2	1	Miguel Mendoza	Philippines	4:00.66	NR
37	1	2	Sng Ju Wei	Singapore	4:01.34	NR
38	2	8	Victor Rogut	Moldova	4:01.42	
39	2	7	Aytekin Mindan	Turkey	4:01.46	
40	1	5	Giancarlo Zolezzi	Chile	4:01.51	
41	1	4	Li Yun-lun	Chinese Taipei	4:03.10	
42	3	1	Hannes Kalteis	Austria	4:03.66	
43	2	6	Dieung Manggang	Malaysia	4:03.77	
44	1	6	Hani Elteir	Egypt	4:04.23	
45	1	3	Ivan Ivanov	Kyrgyzstan	4:09.33	
46	1	7	Marcelino López	Nicaragua	4:18.89	

=== Final ===
Rank	Lane	Name	Nationality	Time	Notes
1st place, gold medalist(s)	4	Ian Thorpe	Australia	3:40.59	WR
2nd place, silver medalist(s)	5	Massimiliano Rosolino	Italy	3:43.40	EU
3rd place, bronze medalist(s)	7	Klete Keller	United States	3:47.00	AM
4	6	Emiliano Brembilla	Italy	3:47.01	
5	1	Dragoș Coman	Romania	3:47.38	NR
6	2	Chad Carvin	United States	3:47.58	
7	8	Grant Hackett	Australia	3:48.22	
8	3	Ryk Neethling	South Africa	3:48.52	
