= Swimming at the 1998 Goodwill Games =

The swimming competition at the 1998 Goodwill Games was held in New York City, New York, USA from 28 July to 2 August.

The format is a team competition.The men's teams are the United States, China, Germany and a World All-Star team and the women's teams are the United States, Russia, Germany and a World All-Star team.

Each men and women’s team competes in a round-robin, dual meet format of 14 events for a total of three dual meets per team. Team accumulates points based upon placement of its entries. Individual event medals are also awarded based upon the overall fastest times in all the competition.

== Men's events ==
Event	Gold		Silver		Bronze	
50 m freestyle	Fernando Scherer; Brazil	22.18 (SA)	Alexander Popov; Russia	22.27	Lorenzo Vismara; Italy	22.46
100 m freestyle	Alexander Popov; Russia	48.86 (GR)	Fernando Scherer; Brazil	48.91	Pieter van den Hoogenband; Netherlands	49.61
200 m freestyle	Pieter van den Hoogenband; Netherlands	1:47.34 (GR)	Josh Davis; United States	1:48.73	Massimiliano Rosolino; Italy	1:49.35
400 m freestyle	Massimiliano Rosolino; Italy	3:52.98	Erik Vendt; United States	3:52.99	Ryk Neethling; South Africa	3:54.61
800 m freestyle	Ryk Neethling; South Africa	8:01.01	Luiz Lima; Brazil	8:01.58	Erik Vendt; United States	8:01.66
100 m backstroke	Stev Theloke; Germany	54.43 (GR)	Lenny Krayzelburg; United States	55.14	Rodolfo Falcón; Cuba	55.22
200 m backstroke	Lenny Krayzelburg; United States	1:58.17 (GR)	Brad Bridgewater; United States	1:59.81	Vladimir Selkov; Russia	2:00.11
100 m butterfly	Denys Sylantyev; Ukraine	52.52 (GR)	Vladislav Kulikov; Russia	53.17	Franck Esposito; France	53.60
200 m butterfly	Denys Sylantyev; Ukraine	1:56.16 (GR)	Franck Esposito; France	1:57.55	Denis Pankratov; Russia	1:58.49
100 m breaststroke	Kurt Grote; United States	1:01.76 (GR)	Jens Kruppa; Germany	1:01.79	Patrick Fowler; United States	1:02.02
200 m breaststroke	Kurt Grote; United States	2:13.16	Pavel Anokhin; Russia	2:14.31	Andrei Ivanov; Russia	2:14.43
200 m individual medley	Curtis Myden; Canada	2:00.38 (GR)	Ron Karnaugh; United States	2:01.90	Jirka Letzin; Germany	2:03.20
4 × 100 m freestyle relay	All-Stars (Brazil) Fernando Scherer (48.69)SA (Netherlands) Pieter van den Hoogenband (Puerto Rico) Ricardo Busquets (Italy) Lorenzo Vismara	3:17.64	Russia; Roman Yegorov; Alexander Popov; Denis Pimankov; Sergey Ashihmin	3:17.99	Germany; Aimo Heilmann; Stefan Herbst; Alexander Luederitz; Michael Kiedel	3:21.48
4 × 100 m medley relay	Russia; Vladimir Selkov; Andrey Korneyev; Vladislav Kulikov; Alexander Popov	3:38.86 (GR)	United States; Lenny Krayzelburg; Kurt Grote; Bryan Jones; Dan Phillips	3:39.46	All-Stars (Italy) Emanuele Merisi (Italy) Domenico Fioravanti (Ukraine) Denys Sylantyev (Venezuela) Francisco Sánchez	3:40.54
