= 1998 European Short Course Swimming Championships – Men's 400 metre freestyle =

The finals and the qualifying heats of the Men's 400 metres Freestyle event at the 1998 European Short Course Swimming Championships were held on the first day of the competition, on Friday 11 December 1998 in Sheffield, England.

== Finals ==
RANK	FINAL	TIME
Gold medal	Emiliano Brembilla (ITA)	3:40.45 ER
Silver medal	Massimiliano Rosolino (ITA)	3:42.87
Bronze medal	Jacob Carstensen (DEN)	3:44.56
4.	Igor Koleda (BLR)	3:45.40
5.	Igor Snitko (UKR)	3:46.57
6.	Dimitris Manganas (GRE)	3:48.51
7.	Frederik Hviid (ESP)	3:49.18
8.	Michael Windisch (AUT)	3:49.69

== Qualifying Heats ==
RANK	HEATS RANKING	TIME
1.	Massimiliano Rosolino (ITA)	3:44.40
2.	Emiliano Brembilla (ITA)	3:45.46
3.	Jacob Carstensen (DEN)	3:47.23
4.	Igor Snitko (UKR)	3:48.47
5.	Igor Koleda (BLR)	3:49.07
6.	Frederik Hviid (ESP)	3:49.08
7.	Dimitris Manganas (GRE)	3:49.55
8.	Michael Windisch (AUT)	3:49.69
9.	Jörg Hoffmann (GER)	3:50.22
10.	Thomas Lohfink (GER)	3:52.05
11.	Tiago Lousada (POR)	3:52.27
12.	Glenn Hudson (GBR)	3:52.97
12.	Maciej Kajak (POL)	3:52.97
14.	Athanasios Oikonomou (GRE)	3:53.69
15.	Graeme Smith (GBR)	3:56.04
16.	Zoltán Szilágyi (HUN)	3:56.35
17.	Juha Lindfors (FIN)	3:57.22
18.	Steve Reys (BEL)	3:59.16
19.	Tiago Pestana (POR)	4:00.53
20.	Mika Varis (FIN)	4:01.32
21.	Mamtou Toszegi (HUN)	4:04.55
—	Květoslav Svoboda (CZE)	DSQ
—	Vlastimil Burda (CZE)	DSQ
