= Dmitry Koptur =

Belarusian swimmer (born 1978)

Personal information
- Full name: Dzmitry Uladzimiravich Koptur
- National team: Belarus
- Born: 6 September 1978 (age 47) Minsk, Belarusian SSR, Soviet Union
- Height: 1.96 m (6 ft 5 in)
- Weight: 82 kg (181 lb)

Sport
- Sport: Swimming
- Strokes: Freestyle
- Club: SK VS Minsk
- Coach: Henadziy Vishniakou

Dzmitry Uladzimiravich Koptur (also Dmitry Koptur, Belarusian: Дзмітрый Уладзіміравіч Коптур; born September 6, 1978) is a Belarusian former swimmer, who specialized in long-distance freestyle events. He is a 2000 Olympian and a three-time Belarusian record holder in the 400, 800, and 1500 m freestyle.

Koptur competed in three swimming events at the 2000 Summer Olympics in Sydney. He cleared a FINA A-standard entry time of 15:27.86 (400 m freestyle) from the European Championships in Helsinki, Finland. On the first day of the Games, Koptur placed twenty-second in the 400 m freestyle. Swimming in heat four, he rounded out the field to last place by almost ten seconds behind winner Massimiliano Rosolino of Italy in 3:55.26. Four days later, Koptur teamed up with Pavel Lagoun, Igor Koleda, and Valeryan Khuroshvili in the 4 × 200 m freestyle relay. Swimming the third leg, Koptur recorded a split of 1:51.14, but the Belarusians fell short to sixth place and twelfth overall in a final time of 7:24.83. In his final event, 1500 m freestyle, Koptur challenged seven other swimmers in heat three, including top favorites Ricardo Monasterio of Venezuela and Spyridon Gianniotis of Greece. He held off Gianniotis by seven hundredths of a second (0.07) to earn a second spot in a time of 15:29.62. Koptur failed to reach the top 8 final, as he placed twentieth overall on the last day of prelims.
