= Rafael Manzano =

Rafael Manzano may refer to:

- Rafael Manzano Martos (born 1936), Spanish architect
- Rafael Manzano (swimmer) (born 1975), Venezuelan swimmer
