= Marcelino López (swimmer) =

Nicaraguan swimmer (born 1975)

Personal information
- Full name: Marcelino de Jesus López Soza
- National team: Nicaragua
- Born: 1 January 1975 (age 51) Managua, Nicaragua
- Height: 1.76 m (5 ft 9 in)
- Weight: 63 kg (139 lb)

Sport
- Sport: Swimming
- Strokes: Freestyle

Marcelino de Jesus López Soza (born January 1, 1975) is a Nicaraguan former swimmer, who specialized in long-distance freestyle events. Lopez qualified for the men's 400 m freestyle at the 2000 Summer Olympics in Sydney, by receiving a Universality place from FINA, in an entry time of 4:14.43. He challenged five other swimmers in heat one, including Singapore's two-time Olympian Sng Ju Wei. Lopez rounded out a small field to last place in 4:18.89, more than four seconds off his entry time. Lopez failed to reach the top 8 final, as he placed forty-sixth overall on the first day of prelims.
