= Swimming at the 1997 European Aquatics Championships – Men's 400 metre freestyle =

The final of the Men's 400 metres Freestyle event at the European LC Championships 1997 was held on Friday 1997-08-22 in Seville, Spain.

== Finals ==
RANK	FINAL A	TIME
	Emiliano Brembilla (ITA)	3:45.96
	Massimiliano Rosolino (ITA)	3:48.11
	Paul Palmer (GBR)	3:50.03
4.	Igor Snitko (UKR)	3:51.12
5.	Denys Zavhorodnyy (UKR)	3:53.98
6.	Graeme Smith (GBR)	3:54.30
7.	Béla Szabados (HUN)	3:55.19
8.	Sergi Roure (ESP)	3:55.95

== See also ==
- 1996 Men's Olympic Games 400m Freestyle
- 1997 Men's World Championships (SC) 400m Freestyle
