= Rosolino =

Rosolino is an Italian surname. Notable people with the surname include:

- Frank Rosolino (1926–1978), American jazz trombonist
- Massimiliano Rosolino (born 1978), Italian swimmer
