= Valeryan Khuroshvili =

Belarusian swimmer

Personal information
- Full name: Valiarian Biezhanovich Khuroshvili
- National team: Belarus
- Born: 4 April 1979 (age 47) Mahilyow, Belarusian SSR, Soviet Union
- Height: 1.84 m (6 ft 0 in)
- Weight: 72 kg (159 lb)

Sport
- Sport: Swimming
- Strokes: Freestyle

Valiarian Biezhanovich Khuroshvili (also Valeryan Khuroshvili, Belarusian: Валяр'ян Бежанович Хурошвили; born April 4, 1979) is a Belarusian former swimmer of Georgian heritage, who specialized in middle-distance freestyle events.

== Career ==
Khuroshvili competed for Belarus in the men's 4 × 200 m freestyle relay at the 2000 Summer Olympics in Sydney. Teaming with Igor Koleda, Dmitry Koptur, and Pavel Lagoun in heat one, Khuroshvili anchored the longest relay race with a split of 1:51.42, but the Belarusians missed the top 8 final by 1.25 seconds with a sixth-place effort and twelfth overall in a final time of 7:24.83.
