= Hani Elteir =

Egyptian swimmer

Hani Eltair
Personal information
- National team: Egypt
- Born: 10 May 1981 (age 45)
- Height: 1.75 m (5 ft 9 in)
- Weight: 75 kg (165 lb)

Sport
- Sport: Swimming
- Strokes: Freestyle

Hani Eltair (Arabic: هاني الطير; born May 10, 1981) is an Egyptian former swimmer, African and Arabian swimming champion, who specialised in long-distance freestyle as well as butterfly events. Eltair competed in the men's 400 m freestyle at the 2000 Summer Olympics in Sydney. He eclipsed a FINA B-standard entry time of 4:04.47 from the Pan Arab Games in Amman, Jordan. He challenged five other swimmers in heat one, including Singapore's two-time Olympian Sng Ju Wei. Eltair held the Egyptian and African under 13 200m butterfly record for a period of 26 years, a record that was considered the most enduring in the history of Egyptian swimming. He won the title of best African swimmer in 1994 in Cairo and in 1996 in Mauritius after winning 14 medals. During his sports career he won more than 800 gold medals, held 38 records, and represented Egypt in more than 60 International swimming events. Eltair used to work as an orthopaedic consultant in Germany, specialising in shoulder and knee surgeries. Now, Eltair works in HMS Al Garhoud and Mirdif Hospitals in Dubai, UAE.
