= Andrei Cecan =

Moldovan swimmer (born 1976)

Personal information
- Full name: Andrei Cecan
- National team: Moldova
- Born: 20 June 1976 (age 50) Chişinău, Moldavian SSR, Soviet Union
- Height: 1.85 m (6 ft 1 in)
- Weight: 78 kg (172 lb)

Sport
- Sport: Swimming
- Strokes: Freestyle
- Club: Dinamo Chişinău

Andrei Cecan (born 20 June 1976) is a Moldovan former swimmer, who specialized in middle-distance freestyle events. He is a single-time Olympian (2000), a sixth-place finalist at the 1999 Summer Universiade, and a member of Dinamo Chişinău.

Cecan made his major international debut at the 1998 FINA World Championships in Perth, Australia. In the 400 m freestyle, he powered home with a fifteenth-place effort in the B-Final in a time of 3:56.68, trailing Hungary's Béla Szabados by two hundredths of a second (0.02).

Cecan competed in the men's 200 m freestyle at the 2000 Summer Olympics in Sydney. He posted a FINA B-time of 1:52.12 from the Summer Universiade in Palma de Mallorca, Spain. He challenged seven other swimmers in heat four, including Ukraine's Rostyslav Svanidze, a top 16 finalist in Atlanta four years earlier. Cecan raced to sixth place by three-tenths of a second (0.30) behind Kyrgyzstan's Dmitri Kuzmin in a time of 1:53.23. Cecan failed to advance into the semifinals, as he placed thirty-first overall in the prelims.
