= Val de Vie Estate =

Estate in Paarl, Western Cape, South Africa

Coordinates: 33°48′33.36″S 18°58′4.72″E

- "Valley of Life"
- Founder: Martin Venter
- Key people: Martin Venter (Founder and CEO), Ryk Neethling
- Products: Property
- Website: www.valdevie.co.za

Val de Vie Estate (from French "Valley of Life") is a residential estate occupying 1000 hectares (2,270 acres), situated between Stellenbosch, Paarl and Franschhoek in the Cape Winelands of South Africa.

The estate encompasses various neighbourhoods each with its own characteristics, surrounded by vineyards, polo fields, natural fynbos vegetation, parks, lakes and mountains.

The estate is known for its polo and wellness facilities, mountain bike trails and L'Huguenot wine cellar.

Val de Vie Estate has been included in the list of the 15 top wellness real estate developments in the world. It is the only estate from Africa to be recognised at this top-tier level. The list, as featured in the Global Wellness Institute’s “2026 Wellness Real Estate Atlas”, highlights the growing importance of the wellness economy, both internationally and locally.

Home to the "Safest House in Africa", Val de Vie Estate has been named the number one residential estate in South Africa for five consecutive years from 2015 to 2019 and was placed in the top 10 lifestyle estates in the world for 2023.

Val de Vie Estate has also received awards for the Best Individual Residence in South Africa (2019), best Multigenerational Resort in the World (2018), Best Residential Development in South Africa (2020), as well as both Best Leisure Development in the World and Best Residential Development in South Africa, at the 2021 International Property Awards.

== History ==
The estate encompasses farmland granted by the Governor of the Cape to French Huguenot Abraham Andries le Roux in 1783 at a time when the Paarl-Franschhoek region was producing the highest volume of wine in South Africa.

Founder Martin Venter bought the land in 2003 and the first homes were built in 2007. In 2016 African Rainbow Capital acquired a 20% stake in Val de Vie Investments.

In 2015 Val de Vie and a consortium of partners acquired the adjacent Pearl Valley Golf & Country Estate from Standard Bank, after Pearl Valley went into business rescue.

The Competition Commission approved acquisition included the entire first phase of Pearl Valley, the Jack Nicklaus Signature Golf Course, the clubhouse, a hotel site on which the Mantis Collection Pearl Valley Hotel would be developed, a 20 hectare equestrian farm, approximately 80 serviced and unsold plots as well as 150 un-serviced residential plots.

== Security ==
Val de Vie Estate was voted "Safest Estate in Africa", and is home to the "Safest House in Africa".

== Awards ==
In 2019, New World Wealth's research ranked Val de Vie 'South Africa's Top Residential Estate' for the fifth consecutive year.

Best Single Unit Residential Development in Africa (The Valentia Manor House) – 2016 International Property Awards in Dubai.

Pearl Valley was rated by Golf Digest in South Africa's Top 5 for 2018 and 2019 and the best conditioned golf course in the Western Cape.

Val de Vie Estate was awarded the 'Best Multigenerational Resort in the World' in 2018 at The Global ceremony in London on 8 November 2018.

At the 2020 International Property Awards, Val de Vie won the award for 'Best Residential Development in South Africa' and Val de Vie Evergreen won the award for 'Best Leisure Development in Africa'.

At the 2021 International Property Awards, Val de Vie won awards for both 'Best Leisure Development in the World' and 'Best Residential Development in South Africa'.

New World Wealth placed Val de Vie in the top 10 lifestyle estates in the world for 2021.

== Sports ==
=== Polo ===
The Val de Vie Polo Club is the most active polo club in Africa. Home to three international-standard polo fields and a clubhouse, it hosts polo matches throughout the season, including the Standard Bank Polo Test Match and Pink Polo.

Val de Vie Estate is the only residential Polo estate in South Africa and the venue for the annual Veuve Clicquot Masters Polo Cape Town. The 2009 event attracted more than 3,000 spectators.

The sixth Sentebale Royal Salute Polo Cup was played at Val de Vie Estate, His Royal Highness Prince Harry participated.

Val de Vie Estate is the host for the Veuve Clicquot Polo Series 2019/2020.

=== Cycling ===
In 2017 the Estate became the official Grand Finale venue, the Champs-Elysées of the 700 km Absa Cape Epic. The 17th edition will take place from 15 to 22 March 2020. The Absa Cape Epic is the largest full-service mountain bike stage race in the world and the only eight-day mountain bike stage race classed as hors catégorie by the Union Cycliste Internationale (UCI).

== Retirement ==
Val de Vie Evergreen, located in the heart of Val de Vie Estate, is South Africa’s safest retirement village. Residents live alongside families and younger professionals and have full access to the Estate’s facilities and security. Before Val de Vie Estate, Paarl was not considered a retirement destination. Val de Vie Evergreen changed that, turning the town into a deliberate choice for South Africa’s wealthiest retirees, alongside Stellenbosch and Franschhoek.

== Events ==
An open-air concert by Andrea Bocelli and the Cape Town Philharmonic Orchestra attracted an audience of 12 000.

Boyzone Irish singer Ronan Keating and Grand Slam golf veteran Gary Player hosted a charity event at Val de Vie raising R1,433,000 for The Gary Player Foundation and the Red Cross War Memorial Children's Hospital Oncology Unit.

== Wine ==
The history of winemaking on the estate dates back to the 17th century when French Huguenot Abraham Andries le Roux employed his expertise in viticulture. L’Huguenot Vinoteque currently produces the Val de Vie and Polo Club labels. Val de Vie started producing Rhône-style wines in 2006, and is now the most comprehensive grower of Rhône varietals outside of France.

A Chinese company, Perfect China, invested in the Val de Vie L'Huguenot wine estate, buying the 62 acre (25-hectare) wine farm with 21 hectares (52 acres) of vineyards.

The 25 hectares (62 acres) under vine produce a variety of cultivars: Roussanne, Ugni Blanc, Durif, Cinsaut, Mourvedre, Shiraz, Carignan, Viognier, Clairette Blanche, Grenache Blanc, Grenache Noir and Merlot. The winery produces 5,000 cases per annum.

The signature Val de Vie wine, is named after the Olympic Swimming Record Holder and Val de Vie Group Marketing Director, Ryk Neethling.

== Biodiversity and conservation ==
As a major part of the Berg River valley falls within the Cape Floral Kingdom (a proclaimed World Heritage Site) the developers worked closely with the Western Cape Department of Environmental Affairs and Development Planning to preserve, protect, enhance, restore, manage and sustain the natural assets.

A 4 hectares (9.9 acres) game reserve is home to endangered species like the Cape Grysbok. Over 100 species of protected fynbos flourish in dedicated environmentally sensitive areas.

Val de Vie Estate is home to a variety of birds, including Cape Canaries, Greater Striped Swallow and Rock Martins, Whiterumped Swift and White-throated Swallow, African Paradise Flycatcher Kingfishers and Black Duck.

The 7 km biodiversity corridor along the Berg River is the second largest in the Western Cape and part of the Cape Floral Kingdom.

== Foundation ==
The Val de Vie Foundation supports the local community with contributions to education, welfare, and social and sporting development, as well as other charitable initiatives. It is funded through a unique model in which 1% of all property sales is donated by the Val de Vie developer, and 2.5% of monthly levies is allocated to community upliftment projects.

Formally established in July 2015, the Foundation marked its 10th anniversary in 2025, celebrating a decade of impact across the Paarl–Franschhoek Valley. Since inception, it has contributed over R50.1 million to a range of local initiatives, benefiting more than 47,000 individuals.

Key beneficiaries include:

> The Elevation Programme, which provides mentorship, training, and career guidance to unemployed youth. Over 1,200 people have been assisted to date;

> Hope Through Action, which develops life and physical skills through sport and education programmes run from community centres in Mbekweni, Franschhoek, and Malmesbury;

> Khula Development Group, which reintegrates at-risk school learners into the education system across 22 schools in and around Paarl and Stellenbosch;

> Mosaic Community Development, which supports orphaned and vulnerable children with physical and emotional care.

Residents of Val de Vie Estate actively participate in the Foundation’s outreach work, volunteering their time and contributing to food and blanket drives and fundraising events such as the annual Pink Polo.

Between 2017 and 2019, the Foundation invested R13.4 million in 40 organisations. By 2023, Val de Vie Estate had injected approximately R34.6 billion into the Drakenstein economy and contributed to the creation of 51,000 indirect and 18,900 permanent jobs—underscoring the broader socioeconomic impact of the estate and its associated philanthropic efforts.
