= Miklós Kollár =

Hungarian swimmer

Personal information
- Born: 18 February 1979 (age 47) Budapest, Hungary

Sport
- Sport: Swimming

Miklós Kollár (born 18 February 1979) is a Hungarian swimmer. He competed in the men's 200 metre freestyle event at the 1996 Summer Olympics.
