= Tim Hoeijmans =

Dutch swimmer

Personal information
- Born: 16 February 1974 (age 51); Heerlen, Netherlands

Sport
- Sport: Swimming

Tim Hoeijmans (born 16 February 1974) is a Dutch swimmer. He competed in the men's 4 × 200 metre freestyle relay event at the 1996 Summer Olympics.
