= Mahmoud El-Wany =

Egyptian swimmer

Personal information
- Full name: Mahmoud Amr El-Wany
- National team: Egypt
- Born: 8 March 1981 (age 45) Cairo, Egypt
- Height: 1.87 m (6 ft 2 in)
- Weight: 90 kg (198 lb)

Sport
- Sport: Swimming
- Strokes: Freestyle
- Club: Al Ahly SC

Mahmoud Amr El-Wany (Arabic: محمود عمر علواني; born March 8, 1981) is an Egyptian former swimmer, who specialized in middle-distance freestyle events. He is a single-time Olympian (2000), and a member of Al-Ahly Swim Club in Cairo.

El-Wany competed only in the men's 200 m freestyle at the 2000 Summer Olympics in Sydney. He eclipsed a FINA B-cut of 1:55.28 (200 m freestyle) from the Egyptian Championships in Cairo. He challenged four other swimmers in heat one, including Uzbekistan's two-time Olympian Oleg Tsvetkovskiy. Leading the other half of the race, El-Wany faded shortly to a second seed on the final lap by 0.26 seconds behind Tsvetkovskiy, but bettered a personal mark of 1:55.19. El-Wany failed to advance into the semifinals, as he placed forty-sixth overall in the prelims.
