= Li Yun-lun =

Taiwanese swimmer

Personal information
- Full name: Li Yun-lun
- National team: Chinese Taipei
- Born: 25 December 1981 (age 44) Taipei, Taiwan
- Height: 1.76 m (5 ft 9 in)
- Weight: 65 kg (143 lb)

Sport
- Sport: Swimming
- Strokes: Freestyle

Li Yun-lun (Chinese: 李 鋆倫; pinyin: Li Yúnlún; born December 25, 1981) is a Taiwanese former swimmer, who specialized in long-distance freestyle events. He is a single-time Olympian and a former record holder in the 400 and 1500 m freestyle.

Li competed in a long-distance freestyle double at the 2000 Summer Olympics in Sydney. He posted FINA B-standards of 4:03.63 (400 m freestyle) and 16:08.43 (1500 m freestyle) from the National University Games in Taipei. On the first day of the Games, Li placed forty-first in the 400 m freestyle. Swimming in heat one, he held off Egypt's Hani Elteir by more than a body length to take a third spot in a lifetime best of 4:03.10. Nearly a week later, in the 1500 m freestyle, Li participated in the same heat against Czech Republic's Vlastimil Burda and Kyrgyzstan's Ivan Ivanov. He came up short in second place and fortieth overall by almost 40 seconds behind winner Burda at 16:13.05.
