= Konstantin Dubrovin =

German swimmer

Personal information
- Nationality: Ukraine / Germany
- Born: January 4, 1977 (age 49) Kyiv, Soviet Union
- Height: 6 ft 3 in (191 cm)
- Weight: 161 lb (73 kg)

Sport
- Sport: Swimming
- Strokes: Freestyle
- Club: 1. Münchner Sportverein
Medal record
Men's swimming
Representing Germany
Olympic Games
Bronze medal – third place	1996 Atlanta	4x200 m freestyle
European Championships (SC)
Bronze medal – third place	1996 Rostock	200 m freestyle

Konstantin Dubrovin (born January 4, 1977, in Kyiv, in the Ukrainian SSR of the Soviet Union) is a former freestyle swimmer, who represented Germany at the 1996 Summer Olympics in Atlanta, Georgia. He took part in the preliminary heats of the Men's 4 × 200 m Freestyle Relay, which eventually won the bronze medal in the final.
