= Lars Conrad =

German swimmer (born 1976)

Personal information
- Nationality: Germany
- Born: 1 June 1976 (age 50) West Berlin, West Germany

Sport
- Sport: Swimming
Medal record
Men's swimming
Representing Germany
Olympic Games
| Silver medal – second place | 2004 Athens | 4×100 m medley |
World Championships (LC)
| Bronze medal – third place | 2001 Fukuoka | 4×100 m freestyle |
| Bronze medal – third place | 2003 Barcelona | 4x200 m freestyle |
World Championships (SC)
| Gold medal – first place | 1997 Gothenburg | 4×100 m freestyle |
| Bronze medal – third place | 1997 Gothenburg | 200 m freestyle |
European Championships (LC)
| Gold medal – first place | 1999 Istanbul | 4×200 m freestyle |
| Gold medal – first place | 2002 Berlin | 4×100 m freestyle |
| Silver medal – second place | 2000 Helsinki | 4×100 m freestyle |
| Silver medal – second place | 2002 Berlin | 4×200 m freestyle |
| Bronze medal – third place | 1997 Seville | 4×200 m freestyle |
| Bronze medal – third place | 1999 Istanbul | 4×100 m freestyle |
European Championships (SC)
| Gold medal – first place | 1996 Rostock | 100 m freestyle |
| Gold medal – first place | 1996 Rostock | 200 m freestyle |
| Gold medal – first place | 1996 Rostock | 4×50 m freestyle |
| Gold medal – first place | 1996 Rostock | 4×50 m medley |

Lars Conrad (born 1 June 1976) is an Olympic and national record holding freestyle swimmer from Germany. He swam for Germany at 2000 and 2004 Olympics.

At the 2004 Olympics, he was part of Germany's silver-medal winner 4×100 m medley relay, alongside Steffen Driesen, Jens Kruppa, and Thomas Rupprath.

== See also ==
- (in German) de:Lars Conrad – entry from German Wikipedia.
- (in German) Official homepage Lars Conrad
