= John Piersma =

American swimmer

Personal information
- Full name: John Michael Piersma
- National team: United States
- Born: January 25, 1975 (age 51) Huntsville, Alabama, U.S.
- Occupations: Physician, internal medicine
- Height: 6 ft 1 in (1.85 m)
- Weight: 170 lb (77 kg)
- Spouses: Rachel Elizabeth Gustin (June, 1998)
- Children: Daughter, Son

Sport
- Sport: Swimming
- Strokes: Freestyle
- Club: Jones Valley Rec. League; Rocket City League (Summers); Huntsville Swim Association (HSA); Club Wolverine (After 1993)
- College team: University of Michigan
- Coach: Rosemary Adams (Grissom High); Brooke Pate (Huntsville Swim); Jon Urbanchek (U. Michigan)

John Michael Piersma (born January 25, 1975) is an American former competition swimmer who competed for the University of Michigan and represented the United States at the 1996 Summer Olympics in Atlanta. At the 1996 Olympics, Piersma participated in the B Finals of the men's 200-meter freestyle and men's 400-meter freestyle. In the 200-meter freestyle, he finished twelfth overall with a time 1:49.90; he placed ninth overall in the 400-meter freestyle with a time of 3:50.69.

== Early life ==
John M. Piersma was born January 25, 1975 in Huntsville, Alabama to Dr. John D. Piersma and mother Mary Piersma. From a family that valued education, medicine, and athletics, John's mother Mary was a Professor and Chair for the Education department at the University of Alabama Huntsville. His father was a physician with a family practice in greater Huntsville. Piersma's brother Mark swam for Miami of Ohio, and had planned to become a physician. His sister Nicole worked for a period as a medical case worker in Nashville, Tennessee.

Graduating in June, 1993, Piersma attended Huntsville's Grissom High School where he led the swim team to three state championships. In his Senior year and for most of his time with the Grissom High School swim team, he was coached by Rosemary Adams. An exceptionally strong program, by 1996 the Grissom High School boy's swim team had won the Alabama State Championship for 13 successive years. During High School, in club competition, he swam for the Jones Valley Recreation League, and the Rocket City Summer League.

Before swimming for the Huntsville Swim Association, Piersma represented the Jones Valley Recreation League and the Rocket City Summer League. Around the age of 10-11, he first began swimming for the Huntsville Swimming Association (HSA) where he was coached by Warren Holladay, and then Brooke Pate, who strongly influenced his development as a successful competitor in local and regional meets. While swimming for HSA under Coach Pate, by the age of 11, Piersma increased Piersma's practice yardage to improve his endurance and speed in competition. During his High School years, Piersma was a Southeastern Champion in freestyle competition in events that ranged from 50 to the 1000 yards. In his early high school years, Piersma could compete in all four strokes, though he excelled in freestyle and where he competed in distances up to the 1,650. While swimming for the U.S. Junior National Team in 1992, he had an eighth place ranking in the 100-meter freestyle with a time of 51.66, was rated second in the 200 meter free with a time of 1:50.84, and was rated sixth in the 400-meter free with a time of 3:58.4. Around the 1992-93 season, he won the National Championship in the 200 meter freestyle at the U.S. Long Course National Championships in Mission Viejo, California.

== University of Michigan ==
Piersma attended the University of Michigan from around 1993-1998, graduating in May 1998, with a degree in kinesiology-movement science. He swam for the Michigan Wolverines under Hall of Fame Michigan Coach Jon Urbanchek, and Alex Braunfeld, where he helped lead the team to three Big Ten Conference championships and the 1995 NCAA Division I National team championship. Michigan Coach Urbanchek had competed for Michigan in college and coached the team continuously from 1982-2004. Urbanchek served as an Assistant U.S. Olympic coach five times. While swimming for Michigan in 1997, Piersma was an NCAA Champion, in both the 200 and 500 yard freestyle events. He earned All-American honors at Michigan each of his four years of eligibility. In 1997, Piersma was named the Big Ten Conference Swimmer of the Year. Piersma swam with four other Michigan swimmers who competed in the 1996 Atlanta games, that included Tom Dolan, Tom Malchow, Eric Wunderlich, and Erik Namesnik.

== 1996 Atlanta Olympics ==
Piersma participated in the 1996 Atlanta Olympics, where he was managed by U.S. Men's Olympic Head Coach Skip Kenney, who coached at Stanford University from 1979-2012. He was the first Huntsville resident to compete in a U.S. Olympics. He trained with the Olympic team for several weeks in Colorado Springs to train for the Olympics. He participated in the B Finals of the July, 1996 Olympics in the men's 200-meter freestyle and men's 400-meter freestyle. In the 200-meter freestyle, he finished twelfth overall with a time 1:49.90. Danyon Loader of New Zealand won the gold with a time of 1:47.63, Gustavo Borges of Brazil took the silver with a time of 1:48.08, and Daniel Kowalski of Australia took the bronze with a time of 1:48.25.

He placed ninth overall in the 400-meter freestyle with a time of 3:50.69. Danyon Loder of New Zealand placed first with a time of 3:47.97, Paul Palmer of Great Britain, who led the first 300 meters, placed second for the silver with a time of 3:49.00, and Daniel Kowalski of Australia placed third for the bronze with a time of 3:49.39.

In 1997, Piersma was slowed somewhat by knee surgery to repair an anterior cruciate ligament, which required six months of physical therapy to recover. Nonetheless, Persma was determined to fit in one more year of competition.

=== Marriage and family ===
On the evening of June 13, 1998, one month after graduating Michigan, Piersma married Rachel Elizabeth Gustin at Knox Presbyterian Church in her hometown of Cincinnati, Ohio. Rachel was planning to begin medical school at the University of Michigan in the Fall of 1998, and had swum on the women's team for the University of Michigan. The couple initially planned to live in Ann Arbor where they would eventually complete medical degrees, after a honeymoon in Europe. The couple had daughter Ella Josephine, born in 2004 in Ann Arbor, and later son Jon W. Piersma. Ella Jo grew up primarily in Cincinnati, and later swam for the University of Michigan from 2022-2026, where she earned twice earned Big 10 Academic Honors, and was named a Distinguished Scholar.

=== International competition highlights ===
Piersma participated in the 1997 Pan Pacific Championships. Placing fourth with a combined team time of 7:20.48, he was part of the U.S. National team's 4×200 meter freestyle relay team at the 1998 FINA World Championships in Perth, Western Australia. At the World Championships, Piersma finished in the top 10 in the 400 meter freestyle, though the World Championships were his last elite competitive meet.

=== Honors ===
Piersma was admitted to the Huntsville-Madison County Athletic Hall of Fame in 2016.

=== Careers ===
After the Olympics, Piersma worked for an Orthopedic Sports medicine company, completed two years of post-graduate work, and performed clinical research prior to his admission to medical school. He worked at a basic research lab at the University of Michigan. Piersma graduated from the University of Michigan Medical School around 2003-4, and completed his residency in internal medicine. Initially out of college with his degree in kinesiology, he had planned to work in an area related to physical therapy, but switched his goal to becoming a physician. After graduating medical school, he became certified in internal medicine and practiced in Cincinnati, Ohio, his wife's hometown. His wife Rachel, practiced as a dermatologist in Cincinnati after graduating the University of Michigan medical school. While practicing internal medicine, Piersma had affiliations with the medical facilities at Mercy-Health Anderson Hospital and Christ Hospital.

== See also ==
- List of University of Michigan alumni
