= Kjell Ivar Lundemoen =

Norwegian swimmer

Personal information
- Nationality: Norwegian
- Born: 23 September 1972 (age 52); Kristiansand, Norway

Sport
- Sport: Swimming

Kjell Ivar Lundemoen (born 23 September 1972) is a Norwegian freestyle swimmer. He was born in Kristiansand. He competed at the 1992 Summer Olympics in Barcelona. He won a total of eleven gold medals at the Norwegian championships.
