= Oleg Tsvetkovskiy =

Uzbekistani swimmer (born 1970)

Personal information
- Full name: Oleg Tsvetkovskiy
- National team: Uzbekistan
- Born: 27 May 1970 (age 56) Tashkent, Uzbek SSR, Soviet Union
- Height: 1.78 m (5 ft 10 in)
- Weight: 76 kg (168 lb)

Sport
- Sport: Swimming
- Strokes: Freestyle

Oleg Nikolayevich Tsvetkovskiy (Uzbek: Олег Николаевич Цветковский; born May 27, 1970) is an Uzbek former swimmer, who specialized in sprint and middle-distance freestyle events. He represented Uzbekistan in two editions of the Olympic Games (1996 and 2000), since the nation's breakup from the Soviet Union.

Tsvetkovskiy made his official debut at the 1996 Summer Olympics in Atlanta. He failed to reach the top 16 final in the 100 m freestyle, finishing forty-eighth in a time of 52.39. A member of the Uzbek team, he also placed seventeenth in the 4 × 100 m freestyle relay (3:28.33), and twelfth in the 4 × 200 m freestyle relay (7:40.60).

At the 2000 Summer Olympics in Sydney, Tsvetkovskiy competed only in two swimming events. He eclipsed a FINA B-cut of 1:55.29 (200 m freestyle) from the Asian Championships in Busan, South Korea. On the first day of the Games, he teamed up with Ravil Nachaev, Petr Vasiliev, and Oleg Pukhnatiy in the 4 × 100 m freestyle relay. Although he swam the second leg in heat one, his team had been disqualified due to an early relay takeoff by Pukhnatiy. The following day, in the 200 m freestyle, Tsvetkovskiy placed forty-fourth on the morning prelims. He edged out Egypt's Mahmoud El-Wany to lead the first heat by 0.26 of a second in a lifetime best of 1:54.93.
