= Fernando Saez =

Brazilian swimmer

Personal information
- Full name: Fernando de Oliveira Saez
- Nationality: Brazil
- Born: 2 October 1974 (age 51) Rio de Janeiro, Rio de Janeiro, Brazil
- Height: 1.82 m (6 ft 0 in)
- Weight: 72 kg (159 lb)

Sport
- Sport: Swimming
- Strokes: Freestyle
Medal record
Men's swimming
Representing Brazil
World Championships (SC)
Bronze medal – third place	1995 Rio de Janeiro	4×200 m free
Pan American Games
Silver medal – second place	1995 Mar del Plata	4×200 m free

Fernando de Oliveira Saez (born 2 October 1974 in Rio de Janeiro) is a former international freestyle swimmer from Brazil. He participated for his native country at the 1996 Summer Olympics. He is currently a swimming teacher and coordinator of the Academia da Praia and of the swimming school he has with fellow Olympian Luiz Lima.

He was a swimming athlete for the Fluminense when he won the silver medal at the 1995 Pan American Games in Mar del Plata, in the 4x200 meter freestyle relay. He also defended the Vasco da Gama and the Flamengo.

At the 1995 FINA World Swimming Championships (25 m) done in Rio de Janeiro, he won the bronze medal in the 4×200-metre freestyle. He also swam the 400-metre freestyle.

At the 1996 Summer Olympics in Atlanta, he finished 10th in the 4×200-metre freestyle.

He was at the 1997 FINA World Swimming Championships (25 m), where he finished 11th in the 200-metre freestyle, and 15th in the 400-metre freestyle.

Saez participated in the 2000 FINA World Swimming Championships (25 m), in Athens, where he finished 8th in the 4×200-metre freestyle final.
