= Sebastien Paddington =

Trinidad and Tobago swimmer (born 1977)

Personal information
- Full name: Sebastien Paddington
- National team: Trinidad and Tobago
- Born: 23 June 1977 (age 49) Port of Spain, Trinidad and Tobago
- Height: 1.80 m (5 ft 11 in)
- Weight: 79 kg (174 lb)

Sport
- Sport: Swimming
- Strokes: Freestyle
- College team: McGill University (CAN)

Sebastien Paddington (born June 23, 1977) is a Trinidad and Tobago former swimmer, who specialized in middle-distance freestyle events. He represented Trinidad and Tobago at the 2000 Summer Olympics, and later became the Chairman of the Board of Directors for Sport Company of Trinidad and Tobago (SporTT). Paddington is also a graduate with a bachelor's degree in geography at McGill University in Montreal, Quebec, Canada.

Paddington competed only in the men's 200 m freestyle at the 2000 Summer Olympics in Sydney. He eclipsed a FINA B-cut of 1:55.05 from the Pan American Games in Winnipeg, Manitoba, Canada. He challenged four other swimmers in heat one, including Uzbekistan's two-time Olympian Oleg Tsvetkovskiy. Entering the race with a fastest-seeded time, he faded shortly to third place by 0.47 seconds behind Tsvetkovskiy in 1:55.40. Paddington failed to advance into the semifinals, as he placed forty-seventh overall in the prelims.
