= Bruno Orsoni =

French swimmer

Personal information
- Born: 21 October 1973 (age 52)

Sport
- Sport: Swimming

Bruno Orsoni (born 21 October 1973) is a French former freestyle swimmer who competed in the 1996 Summer Olympics.
