= Javier Botello =

Spanish swimmer

Personal information
- National team: Spain
- Born: January 27, 1976 (age 50)

Sport
- Sport: Swimming

Javier Botello (born 27 January 1976) is a Spanish former freestyle swimmer who competed in the 2000 Summer Olympics.
