= Michael Kiedel =

German swimmer (born 1975)

Personal information
- Born: 23 December 1975 (age 50) Stuttgart, Germany

Sport
- Sport: Swimming
Medal record
Representing Germany
European Championships
Gold medal – first place	1999 Istanbul	4x200m freestyle relay
Silver medal – second place	2000 Helsinki	4x200m freestyle relay
Summer Universiade
Bronze medal – third place	1997 Sicily	200m freestyle
Bronze medal – third place	1997 Sicily	4x200m freestyle relay

Michael Kiedel (born 23 December 1975 in Stuttgart) is a German former swimmer who competed in the 2000 Summer Olympics.
