= Vlastimil Burda =

Czech swimmer

Personal information
- Full name: Vlastimil Burda
- Nickname: Vlasta
- National team: Czech Republic
- Born: 4 November 1975 (age 50) Litoměřice, Czechoslovakia
- Height: 2.00 m (6 ft 7 in)
- Weight: 97 kg (214 lb)

Sport
- Sport: Swimming
- Strokes: Freestyle
- Club: USK Praha
- College team: California State University (U.S.)
- Coach: Jaroslav Strnad

Vlastimil Burda (born November 4, 1975) is a Czech former swimmer, who specialized in long-distance freestyle events. He is a single-time Olympian (2000) and a resident athlete for USK Praha in Prague. While studying in the United States, Burda held two NCAA championship titles, and a school record (4:22.58) in the 400-yard freestyle since 2002, as a member of Cal State Bakersfield Roadrunners.

Burda competed in a long-distance freestyle double at the 2000 Summer Olympics in Sydney. He cleared a FINA A-standard entry time of 3:53.36 (400 m freestyle) from the European Championships in Helsinki, Finland. In the 400 m freestyle, held on the first day of the Games, Burda challenged seven other swimmers in heat five, including Australia's overwhelming favorite Grant Hackett. He held off Greece's Spyridon Gianniotis to pick up a sixth spot and nineteenth overall by more than half of his body length, standing at 2.00 m (6 ft 6 1/2 in), in a time of 3:54.40. Nearly a week later, in the 1500 m freestyle, Burda placed twenty-sixth on the morning prelims. Swimming in heat one, he stormed home with an easy triumph against Chinese Taipei's Li Yun-lun and Kyrgyzstan's Ivan Ivanov, in a lifetime best of 15:33.25.
