= Rafael Manzano (swimmer) =

Venezuelan swimmer

Personal information
- Born: 21 March 1975 (age 51)

Sport
- Sport: Swimming

Rafael Manzano (born 21 March 1975) is a Venezuelan swimmer. He competed in the men's 4 × 200 metre freestyle relay event at the 1996 Summer Olympics.
