= Igor Koleda =

Belarusian swimmer

Personal information
- Full name: Ihar Mikalaievich Kaliada
- National team: Belarus
- Born: 16 October 1978 (age 47) Minsk, Belarusian SSR, Soviet Union
- Height: 1.86 m (6 ft 1 in)
- Weight: 75 kg (165 lb)

Sport
- Sport: Swimming
- Strokes: Freestyle
- Club: Dynamo Minsk

Ihar Mikalaievich Kaliada (also Igor Koleda, Belarusian: Ігар Мікалаевіч Каляда; born October 16, 1978) is a Belarusian former swimmer, who specialized in middle-distance freestyle events. He placed seventh in the 200 m freestyle (1:47.29) at the 1998 European Short Course Swimming Championships in Sheffield, England, and later represented Belarus at the 2000 Summer Olympics in Sydney.

Koleda competed in three swimming events at the 2000 Summer Olympics in Sydney. He cleared a FINA A-standard of 1:49.66 from the Belarusian Open Championships in Minsk. On the first day of the Games, Koleda teamed up with Dmitry Kalinovsky, Pavel Lagoun, and Oleg Rykhlevich in the 4 × 100 m freestyle relay. Swimming the lead-off leg in heat one, Koleda recorded a split of 49.95, but the Belarusians came up short in third place and tenth overall with a final time of 3:20.85. In the 200 m freestyle, Koleda failed to reach the top 8 final, finishing in twelfth place at 1:49.52. Earlier in the prelims, he broke a Belarusian record of 1:49.01 to pick up a seventh seed for the semifinals. Koleda also placed twelfth, along with Lagoun, Dmitry Koptur, and Valeryan Khuroshvili, in the 4 × 200 m freestyle relay (7:24.83).
