= Sng Ju Wei =

Singaporean swimmer

Personal information
- Full name: Sng Ju Wei
- National team: Singapore
- Born: 3 June 1980 (age 46) Singapore
- Height: 1.77 m (5 ft 10 in)
- Weight: 73 kg (161 lb)

Sport
- Sport: Swimming
- Strokes: Freestyle
- Club: APSC Singapore
- Coach: Jin Xia Li
Medal record
Men's swimming
Southeast Asian Games
Gold medal – first place	2001 Kuala Lumpur	4×100 m freestyle relay
Gold medal – first place	2001 Kuala Lumpur	4×200 m freestyle relay
Silver medal – second place	1999 Brunei	200m freestyle
Silver medal – second place	1999 Brunei	4x100m freestyle relay
Silver medal – second place	1999 Brunei	4x200m freestyle relay
Bronze medal – third place	1995 Chiang Mai	4x100m freestyle relay
Bronze medal – third place	1995 Chiang Mai	4x100m medley relay
Bronze medal – third place	1997 Jakarta	200m freestyle
Bronze medal – third place	1997 Jakarta	4x100m freestyle relay
Bronze medal – third place	1999 Brunei	200m freestyle
Bronze medal – third place	1999 Brunei	4x100m medley relay
Bronze medal – third place	2001 Kuala Lumpur	200 m freestyle

Sng Ju Wei (born 3 June 1980) is a Singaporean former swimmer, who specialized in sprint and middle-distance freestyle events. He is a two-time Olympian (1996 and 2000), and a triple medalist at the 2001 Southeast Asian Games. Sng also trained for the Aquatic Performance Swim Club in Singapore district, under head coach Jin Xia Li.

Sng made his Olympic debut, as a 16-year-old from Singapore, at the 1996 Summer Olympics in Atlanta. He failed to reach the top 16 final in any of his individual events, finishing fifty-eighth in the 50 m freestyle (25.04), fifty-seventh in the 100 m freestyle (53.50), thirty-seventh in the 200 m freestyle (1:55.51), and thirty-third in the 400 m freestyle (4:12.24). As a member of the Singaporean squad, Sng also placed fifteenth in the 4×200 m freestyle relay (7:54.19), and twenty-third in the 4×100 m medley relay (3:59.51), along with his teammates Desmond Koh, Gerald Koh, and Thum Ping Tjin.

At the 2000 Summer Olympics in Sydney, Sng drastically shortened his program, swimming only in the 400 m freestyle on the first day of the Games. He posted a FINA B-standard of 4:04.55 from the Southeast Asian Games in Brunei. He established a Singaporean record of 4:01.34 to hit the wall first in heat one, holding off Chile's Giancarlo Zolezzi by 0.17 of a second. Sng failed to reach the top 8 final, as he placed thirty-seventh overall in the prelims.

At the 2001 Southeast Asian Games in Kuala Lumpur, Malaysia, Sng won a total of three medals: two golds in the 4×100 m freestyle relay (3:27.48) and 4×200 m freestyle relay (7:38.82), and bronze in the 200 m freestyle (1:54.33).
