= Pavel Lagoun =

Belarusian swimmer (born 1979)

Personal information
- Full name: Pavel Mikalaievich Lahun
- National team: Belarus
- Born: 12 February 1979 (age 47) Minsk, Belarusian SSR, Soviet Union
- Height: 1.83 m (6 ft 0 in)
- Weight: 74 kg (163 lb)

Sport
- Sport: Swimming
- Strokes: Freestyle, butterfly
- Club: RTsFVS Minsk

Pavel Mikalayevich Lahun (Belarusian: Павел Мікалаевіч Лагун; born 12 February 1979) is a Belarusian former swimmer, who specialized in freestyle and butterfly events. He is a two-time Olympian (2000 and 2004), and a three-time medalist at the FINA World Cup.

Lagoun made his first Belarusian team at the 2000 Summer Olympics in Sydney, where he placed tenth in the 4×100 m freestyle (3:20.85), and twelfth in the 4×200 m freestyle (7:24.83), as a member of the Belarusian swimming team.

At the 2004 Summer Olympics in Athens, Lagoun qualified as an individual swimmer for the men's 100 m butterfly. He cleared a FINA B-standard entry time of 53.66 from the European Championships in Madrid, Spain. He challenged seven other swimmers on the fifth heat, including top medal favorite Milorad Čavić of Serbia and Montenegro. He raced to fifth place by 0.24 of a second behind France's Frédérick Bousquet in 53.87. Lagoun failed to advance into the semifinals, as he placed twenty-sixth overall in the preliminaries.
