= Aimo Heilmann =

German swimmer (born 1974)

Medal record

Men's swimming

Representing Germany

Olympic Games
Bronze medal – third place	1996 Atlanta	4x200 m freestyle

World Championships (SC)
Gold medal – first place	1997 Gothenburg	4x100 m freestyle

Aimo-Rhys Heilmann (born October 22, 1974) is a former freestyle swimmer from Germany, who won the bronze medal in the 4 × 200 m Freestyle Relay at the 1996 Summer Olympics in Atlanta, Georgia. He did so alongside Christian Keller, Christian Tröger, and Steffen Zesner. Winner of six German titles (1995-1999), Heilmann won the world title in the 4 × 100 m Freestyle at the 1997 FINA Short Course World Championships.
