= Ricardo Pedroso =

Portuguese swimmer (born 1977)

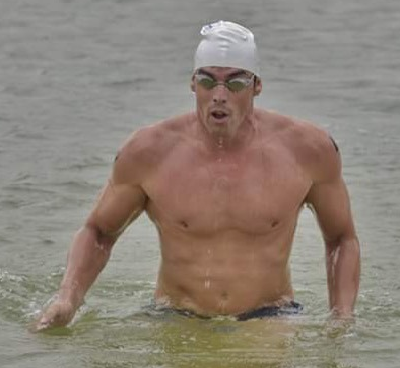

Personal information
- Full name: Ricardo da Conceição Jacinto; Pedroso
- Nationality: Portugal
- Born: 23 March 1977 (age 49) Oeiras, Portugal
- Height: 1.83 m (6 ft 0 in)
- Weight: 75 kg (165 lb)

Sport
- Sport: Swimming
- Strokes: Freestyle
- Club: Sport Algés e Dafundo
- Coach: Paulo Frischknecht

Ricardo da Conceição Jacinto Pedroso (born 23 March 1977 in Oeiras) is a retired Portuguese swimmer, who specialized in middle-distance freestyle events. He represented Portugal at the 2000 Summer Olympics, and held a national record in the 200 m freestyle before it was later broken by Tiago Venâncio in 2007. Pedroso also trained for Sport Algés e Dafundo under head coach Paulo Frischknecht, a former Portuguese swimmer and a two-time Olympian (1976 and 1980).

Pedroso qualified for the men's 200 m freestyle at the 2000 Summer Olympics in Sydney. He posted a FINA B-standard of 1:52.15 from the Portuguese National Championships in Lisbon. He challenged seven other swimmers in heat four including Ukraine's Rostyslav Svanidze, a top 16 finalist in Atlanta four years earlier. He raced to third place in 1:52.60, just 0.45 of a second off his record and entry time. Pedroso failed to advance into the semifinals, as he placed twenty-fifth overall in the prelims.

Beside his Olympic participation he also has other accomplishments in his career: 12 times Portuguese clubs champion, national champion in all swimming categories, 100 national records, participated in 3 World and 5 European Championships, 5 World Cups, 1 University World Championship, 3 Latin Cups and 6 Youth Multinations events. He was a medallist in World and Latin Cups, Youth Multinations, and finalist in European Championships. Later in Masters competitions he was also a medallist in World and European events. Participated in a Guinness world record, in several Portuguese open water crossings like Setúbal, Troia and Sesimbra, won the challenger Open Water event in Tomar and also the crossing Ricardo Pedroso, named after him.

As coach, he was national clubs champion with 4 different clubs and the only to be clubs champion both as a swimmer and coach.
