= Miroslav Vučetić =

Croatian swimmer (born 1976)

Personal information
- Born: 8 August 1976 (age 49) Split, Yugoslavia

Sport
- Sport: Swimming
- College team: Syracuse

Miroslav Vučetić (born 8 August 1976) is a Croatian swimmer. He competed in five events at the 1996 Summer Olympics. He was an All-America swimmer four years during his college career at Syracuse University. He was named Big East's Male Swimmer of the Year.
