= Anders Lyrbring =

Swedish swimmer

Medal record

Men's swimming

Representing Sweden

Olympic Games
Silver medal – second place	1996 Atlanta	4x200 m freestyle

World Championships (SC)
Silver medal – second place	1997 Gothenburg	4x200 m freestyle

Anders Christer Lyrbring (born 21 March 1978 in Gothenburg, Västra Götaland County) is a former freestyle swimmer from Sweden. He won the silver medal in the 4 × 200 m Freestyle Relay at the 1996 Summer Olympics together with Christer Wallin, Anders Holmertz and Lars Frölander.

== Clubs ==
- Simavdelningen 1902
