= Emiliano Brembilla =

Italian swimmer (born 1978)

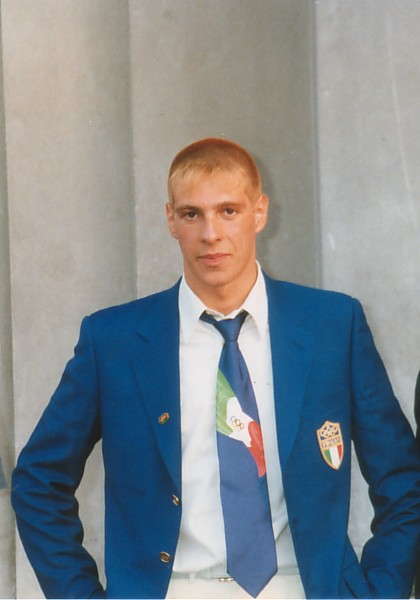
- Emiliano Brembilla, Atlanta 1996

Personal information
- Full name: Emiliano Brembilla
- Nationality: Italy
- Born: 21 December 1978 (age 47) Ponte San Pietro, Bergamo, Italy

Sport
- Sport: Swimming
- Strokes: Freestyle
Medal record
Event	1st	2nd	3rd
Olympic Games	0	0	1
World Championships (LC)	0	2	1
World Championships (SC)	0	0	1
European Championships (LC)	10	3	0
European Championships (SC)	5	0	1
Mediterranean Games	5	0	0
Total	20	5	4
Olympic Games
Bronze medal – third place	2004 Athens	4×200 m freestyle
World Championships (LC)
Silver medal – second place	1998 Perth	1500 m freestyle
Silver medal – second place	2001 Fukuoka	4×200 m freestyle
Bronze medal – third place	2001 Fukuoka	400 m freestyle
World Championships (SC)
Bronze medal – third place	2008 Manchester	4×200 m freestyle
European Championships (LC)
Gold medal – first place	1997 Seville	400 m freestyle
Gold medal – first place	1997 Seville	1500 m freestyle
Gold medal – first place	2000 Helsinki	400 m freestyle
Gold medal – first place	2000 Helsinki	4×200 m freestyle
Gold medal – first place	2002 Berlin	400 m freestyle
Gold medal – first place	2002 Berlin	4×200 m freestyle
Gold medal – first place	2004 Madrid	400 m freestyle
Gold medal – first place	2004 Madrid	4×200 m freestyle
Gold medal – first place	2006 Budapest	4×200 m freestyle
Gold medal – first place	2008 Eindhoven	4×200 m freestyle
Silver medal – second place	1999 Istanbul	400 m freestyle
Silver medal – second place	2000 Helsinki	1500 m freestyle
Silver medal – second place	2002 Berlin	200 m freestyle
European Championships (SC)
Gold medal – first place	1996 Rostock	400 m freestyle
Gold medal – first place	1998 Sheffield	400 m freestyle
Gold medal – first place	2001 Antwerp	400 m freestyle
Gold medal – first place	2002 Riesa	400 m freestyle
Gold medal – first place	2002 Riesa	200 m freestyle
Bronze medal – third place	1998 Sheffield	1500 m freestyle
Mediterranean Games
Gold medal – first place	1997 Bari	400 m freestyle
Gold medal – first place	1997 Bari	1500 m freestyle
Gold medal – first place	2001 Tunis	200 m freestyle
Gold medal – first place	2001 Tunis	400 m freestyle
Gold medal – first place	2005 Almería	4×200 m freestyle

Emiliano Brembilla (born 21 December 1978) is a freestyle swimmer from Italy who was five-time individual European Champion, four in 400 m freestyle (1997, 2000, 2002 and 2004) and one in 1500 m freestyle (1997).

== Career ==
He won the bronze medal with the men's 4×200 m freestyle relay team at the 2004 Summer Olympics in Athens, Greece. A long-distance specialist, he made his first mark at the 1997 European Swimming Championships in Seville, Spain, where he won three titles. Brembilla competed in four consecutive Summer Olympics for his native country, starting in 1996.

== Personal bests ==
Individual long course

- 100 m freestyle: 50.58
- 200 m freestyle: 1:46.29
- 400 m freestyle: 3:45.11
- 800 m freestyle: 7:55.17
- 1500 m freestyle: 14:58.65

== National titles ==
Brembilla won 41 national championships at individual senior level.

- Absolute (18)
  - 200 freestyle: 1996, 1997, 1999, 2000, 2002, 2005, 2008 (7)
  - 400 freestyle: 1996, 1997, 2000, 2002, 2004, 2005 (6)
  - 800 freestyle: 2002, 2004, 2005 (3)
  - 1500 freestyle: 1996, 2000 (2)
- Winter (16)
  - 200 freestyle: 2000, 2002, 2003 (3)
  - 400 freestyle: 1996, 1997, 2000, 2002, 2003, 2004, 2005, 2006 (8)
  - 800 freestyle: 2006 (1)
  - 1500 freestyle: 1997, 1999, 2000 2002 (4)
- Spring (7)
  - 200 freestyle: 1998, 2002 (2)
  - 200 freestyle: 1998, 2001, 2002, 2004 (4)
  - 800 freestyle: 1998 (1)

== See also ==
- European Aquatics Championships - Multiple medalists in swimming
- Italian swimmers multiple medalists at the internetional competitions

Awards
Preceded by Denis Pankratov	European Swimmer of the Year; 1997	Succeeded by Denys Sylantyev
