= Ryk Neethling =

South African swimmer and Olympic gold medalist

Personal information
- Full name: Ryk Neethling
- Nationality: South African
- Born: 17 November 1977 (age 48) Bloemfontein
- Height: 196 cm (6 ft 5 in)
- Weight: 95 kg (209 lb)

Sport
- Sport: Swimming
- Strokes: Freestyle
- Club: Seals Swim Club; Bloemfontein, S.A.
- College team: University of Arizona
- Coach: Simon Gray (Seals SC); R. DeMont, F. Busch (U. A.)
Medal record
Men's swimming
Representing South Africa
Olympic Games
| Gold medal – first place | 2004 Athens | 4×100 m free |
World Championships (LC)
| Bronze medal – third place | 2005 Montreal | 100 m freestyle |
| Bronze medal – third place | 2005 Montreal | 200 m freestyle |
World Championships (SC)
| Gold medal – first place | 2006 Shanghai | 100 m freestyle |
| Gold medal – first place | 2006 Shanghai | 100 m medley |
| Gold medal – first place | 2006 Shanghai | 200 m freestyle |
Pan Pacific Championships
| Silver medal – second place | 1999 Sydney | 1500 m freestyle |
| Bronze medal – third place | 1999 Sydney | 200 m freestyle |
| Bronze medal – third place | 1999 Sydney | 400 m freestyle |
Goodwill Games
| Gold medal – first place | 1998 New York | 800 m freestyle |
| Bronze medal – third place | 1998 New York | 400 m freestyle |
Commonwealth Games
| Gold medal – first place | 2006 Melbourne | 4×100 m free |
| Silver medal – second place | 1998 Kuala Lumpur | 1500 m freestyle |
| Silver medal – second place | 2002 Manchester | 4×100 m free |
| Silver medal – second place | 2006 Melbourne | 100 freestyle |
| Bronze medal – third place | 2002 Manchester | 100 m freestyle |

Ryk Neethling OIS (born 17 November 1977) is a South African businessman who rose to prominence as a three-time World Aquatic Champion and four-time World Record breaking Olympic swimming champion, participating in four Olympics for South Africa from 1996-2008. He won a gold medal in the 4x100 freestyle relay at the 2004 Athens Olympics, and is known as one of the most accomplished South African swimmers in history. He would later serve as the CEO of the Princess Charlene of Monaco Foundation South Africa, and found the Ryk Neethling Swimming Schools.

Born in Bloemfontein, S.A. on 17 November 1977, he attended Grey College, and was coached by Simon Gray at the Seals Swim Club of Bloemfontein. In 1994, Ryk eclipsed the 1500m freestyle South African record by ten seconds, formerly set by his own coach Simon Gray in 1976. Around 18, he captured the 400 and 1500m freestyle competition at the 1995 South African swimming championships. During his time at Grey College, he gained national recognition as a swimmer, earning a place with the South African swimming team for the 1996 Summer Olympics in Atlanta. He enrolled at the University of Arizona after the 1996 games.

== University of Arizona ==
After attending the 1996 Atlanta Olympics in Atlanta, Georgia, Neethling attended the University of Arizona in Tucson, Arizona, enrolling in the Fall of 1996 and attending through 2000, where he was managed and trained by ASCAA Hall of Fame Head Coach Frank Busch, and Assistant Hall of Fame Coach Rick DeMont. DeMont was a former holder of the 1500-meter world record in 1972, and an Olympic participant who had initially won the 400-meter freestyle and was well suited to improve Neethling's freestyle technique and efficiency.

Neethling won nine National Collegiate Athletic Association championships while a student at Arizona. As a Sophomore, he won NCAA titles in the 200, 500, and 1650-yard freestyle. He was a Pac-10 Conference individual champion seven times, an All-American seventeen times, and the NCAA Division I Swimmer of the Year for 1998-99. Graduating around 2000, he earned a Bachelor of Arts degree in Psychology and Business from the University.

== Olympics 1996-2008 ==
He was the first South African to compete in four successive Olympic Games from 1996-2008.

He participated in the 1500 at the Atlanta Olympic Games in 1996 finishing fifth with a time of 15:14.63. He again finished fifth in the 1500 with an improved time of 15.00.48 at the 2000 Sydney Olympic games, less than four seconds from contending for a bronze medal.

== 2004 Athens Olympic gold medal ==
Neethling won an Olympic gold medal in the 4×100 m freestyle relay freestyle relay at the 2004 Summer Olympics in a high point of his career. The 2004 4x100 meter Olympic gold medal South African relay team that set a winning time of 3:13.17, consisted of Roland Schoeman, Lyndon Ferns, Darian Townsend and Neethling. As one of the events fastest swimmers, Schoeman's opening leg in the 4x100 meter freestyle relay, opened up a short lead that remained throughout the race defeating the second place Netherlands team at the finish by a second and defeating the United States team which took the bronze. Making a major contribution, Neethling maintained the lead swimming the anchor position with a time of 47.99, the fastest time of all the South African relay swimmers. Neethling placed 4th in the individual 100 meter freestyle at the 2004 games.

At the 2008 Olympics, he again competed in the 100-meter freestyle placing 30th, and in the 4x100 meter freestyle relay, one of his signature events, he placed seventh.

=== World and S.A. records ===
He is the former joint owner of the 4×100 m freestyle relay world record and broke the 100m Individual Medley World Record three times in 2005. He has held the South African record in the 200 m, 400 m, 800 m and 1500 m freestyle events. He also broke three world records in the 100m individual medley.

=== International competition highlights ===
Neethling participated in the 1998 Commonwealth Games, winning the silver medal in the 1500 m freestyle, but only capturing a fifth place at the 1998 World Aquatics Championships. In 1999 he had a better performance at the Pan Pacific Championships winning silver in the 1500 m freestyle, and bronze in the 400 m and 200 m freestyle.

After achieving a disappointing fifth place in the 1500 m freestyle event and an eighth in the 400 m freestyle at the 2000 Summer Olympics in Sydney, he decided to quit competing in the 1500 m event, preferring to focus on the 50 m and 100 m freestyle events. At the 2002 Commonwealth Games he captured a bronze medal in the 100 m freestyle and finished 4th in the 50 m freestyle events. At the 2006 Commonwealth Games he captured a silver in the 100 m freestyle and was part of the S.A gold medal winning 4×100 m freestyle relay team. He won three individual gold medals at the 2006 FINA World Aquatics Championships in Shanghai.

In November 2005, he announced that he had refused a multimillion-dollar offer by Qatar's Olympic body to switch nationalities and swim for Qatar at the 2008 Beijing Olympics.

== Professional life ==
He has served as CEO of the Princess Charlene of Monaco Foundation South Africa, a Laureus Sport for Good Foundation Ambassador, founder of the Ryk Neethling Swimming Schools and a director and shareholder of Val de Vie Estate. He is also an international keynote and motivational speaker.

Neethling opened the second branch of the Ryk Neethling Swimming School and Academy in South Africa around June of 2012. The academy focuses on teaching children swimming at an early age, a focus Neethling believed could be a life-long benefit.

He has more recently served as a shareholder and marketing director of Val de Vie Estate a luxury property development in Paarl, South Africa.

== Honors ==
At the University of Arizona, he was considered one of the most honored swimmers in the history of the school. He was named the American NCAA Swimmer of the Year and Athlete of the Century in 1999. He was an Arizona Athlete of the Year, and won the University of Arizona Athlete of the Century award. He was a Pac-10 Athlete of the Year four years in a row while at Arizona.

In August, 2024, he was inducted into the South Africa Sports Hall of Fame, along with the three other swimmers who won the gold medal in the 4x100 meter freestyle relay at the 2004 Athens Olympics.

== See also ==
- List of Commonwealth Games medallists in swimming (men)
- List of Olympic medalists in swimming (men)
- World record progression 4 × 100 metres freestyle relay

Records
| Preceded by Roland Schoeman | World Record Holder; Men's 100 Individual Medley (25m); 22 January 2005 – 12 April 2008 | Succeeded by Ryan Lochte |

Sporting positions
| Preceded by Ed Moses | FINA World Cup overall male winner 2004/2005, 2005/2006 | Succeeded by Randall Bal |
