= Jure Bučar =

Slovenian swimmer

Personal information
- Full name: Jure Bučar
- Nationality: Slovenia
- Born: January 4, 1966 (age 60) Ljubljana, Slovenia, Yugoslavia
- Height: 1.80 m (5 ft 11 in)
- Weight: 74 kg (163 lb)

Sport
- Sport: Swimming
- Strokes: Freestyle
- Club: Olimpija, Ljubljana

Jure Bučar (born January 4, 1966, in Ljubljana) is a retired male freestyle swimmer from Slovenia. He represented his native country in three consecutive Summer Olympics, starting in 1992 (Barcelona, Spain).
