= Béla Szabados (swimmer) =

Hungarian swimmer (born 1974)

Personal information
- Full name: Szabados Béla
- Nationality: Hungary
- Born: February 18, 1974 (age 52) Békéscsaba, Békés

Sport
- Sport: Swimming
- Strokes: Freestyle
- College team: University of Southern California
Medal record
World Championships (SC)
Gold medal – first place	2000 Athens	200 m freestyle
European Championships (LC)
Silver medal – second place	1993 Sheffield	4×100 m medley
Bronze medal – third place	1991 Athens	4×100 m medley
Bronze medal – third place	1997 Seville	200 m freestyle
Summer Universiade
Gold medal – first place	1997 Catania	200 m freestyle
Silver medal – second place	1997 Catania	400 m freestyle

Béla Szabados (born February 18, 1974, in Békéscsaba) is a former freestyle swimmer from Hungary, who competed in two consecutive Summer Olympics for his native country, starting in 1992. He studied at the University of Southern California. Szabados continues to compete as a Masters swimmer, representing West Loop Athletic Club in Chicago, IL. He has set two Illinois Masters Swimming records in the 35-39 age group.
