= Massimiliano Rosolino =

Italian swimmer (born 1978)

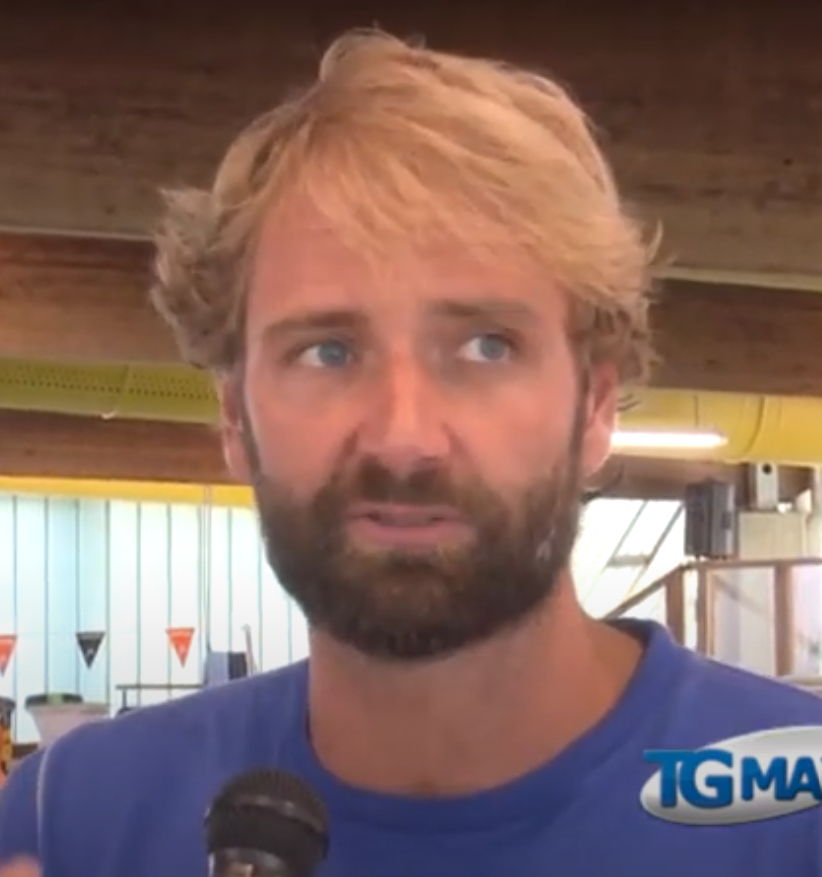
- Rosolino in 2020.

Personal information
- Full name: Massimiliano Edgar Rosolino
- Nicknames: Massi, Max
- Nationality: Italy
- Born: 11 July 1978 (age 47) Naples, Campania, Italy
- Height: 1.92 m (6 ft 4 in)

Sport
- Sport: Swimming
- Strokes: Freestyle and medley
- Club: Larus Nuoto, Roma
Medal record
Men's swimming
Representing Italy
Event	1st	2nd	3rd
Olympic Games	1	1	2
World Championships (LC)	1	3	1
World Championships (SC)	1	2	7
European Championships (LC)	7	8	6
European Championships (SC)	7	8	5
Mediterranean Games	5	0	0
Total	22	22	21
Olympic Games
Gold medal – first place	2000 Sydney	200 m medley
Silver medal – second place	2000 Sydney	400 m freestyle
Bronze medal – third place	2000 Sydney	200 m freestyle
Bronze medal – third place	2004 Athens	4×200 m freestyle
World Championships (LC)
Gold medal – first place	2001 Fukuoka	200 m medley
Silver medal – second place	1998 Perth	200 m freestyle
Silver medal – second place	2001 Fukuoka	4×200 m freestyle
Silver medal – second place	2007 Melbourne	4×100 m freestyle
Bronze medal – third place	2003 Barcelona	200 m medley
World Championships (SC)
Gold medal – first place	2006 Shanghai	4×200 m freestyle
Silver medal – second place	2000 Athens	200 m freestyle
Silver medal – second place	2008 Manchester	400 m freestyle
Bronze medal – third place	1999 Hong Kong	400 m freestyle
Bronze medal – third place	2000 Athens	400 m freestyle
Bronze medal – third place	2000 Athens	200 m medley
Bronze medal – third place	2006 Shanghai	400 m freestyle
Bronze medal – third place	2006 Shanghai	200 m freestyle
Bronze medal – third place	2008 Manchester	200 m freestyle
Bronze medal – third place	2008 Manchester	4×200 m freestyle
European Championships (LC)
Gold medal – first place	2000 Helsinki	200 m freestyle
Gold medal – first place	2000 Helsinki	200 m medley
Gold medal – first place	2000 Helsinki	4×200 m freestyle
Gold medal – first place	2002 Berlin	4×200 m freestyle
Gold medal – first place	2004 Madrid	4×200 m freestyle
Gold medal – first place	2006 Budapest	4×200 m freestyle
Gold medal – first place	2008 Eindhoven	4×200 m freestyle
Silver medal – second place	1997 Seville	200 m freestyle
Silver medal – second place	1997 Seville	400 m freestyle
Silver medal – second place	1999 Istanbul	200 m medley
Silver medal – second place	2002 Berlin	400 m freestyle
Silver medal – second place	2006 Budapest	200 m freestyle
Silver medal – second place	2006 Budapest	400 m freestyle
Silver medal – second place	2008 Eindhoven	400 m freestyle
Silver medal – second place	2008 Eindhoven	4×100 m freestyle
Bronze medal – third place	1995 Vienna	4×200 m freestyle
Bronze medal – third place	1999 Istanbul	200 m freestyle
Bronze medal – third place	2002 Berlin	200 m freestyle
Bronze medal – third place	2004 Madrid	200 m freestyle
Bronze medal – third place	2004 Madrid	200 m medley
Bronze medal – third place	2008 Eindhoven	200 m freestyle
European Championships (SC)
Gold medal – first place	1999 Lisbon	400 m freestyle
Gold medal – first place	2000 Valencia	200 m freestyle
Gold medal – first place	2000 Valencia	400 m freestyle
Gold medal – first place	2000 Valencia	1500 m freestyle
Gold medal – first place	2000 Valencia	200 m medley
Gold medal – first place	2003 Dublin	400 m freestyle
Gold medal – first place	2004 Vienna	400 m freestyle
Silver medal – second place	1998 Sheffield	200 m freestyle
Silver medal – second place	1998 Sheffield	400 m freestyle
Silver medal – second place	1999 Lisbon	200 m freestyle
Silver medal – second place	2003 Dublin	200 m medley
Silver medal – second place	2004 Vienna	200 m freestyle
Silver medal – second place	2005 Trieste	200 m freestyle
Silver medal – second place	2006 Helsinki	200 m freestyle
Silver medal – second place	2008 Rijeka	400 m freestyle
Bronze medal – third place	1999 Lisbon	200 m medley
Bronze medal – third place	2003 Dublin	1500 m freestyle
Bronze medal – third place	2003 Dublin	400 m medley
Bronze medal – third place	2004 Vienna	1500 m freestyle
Bronze medal – third place	2008 Rijeka	200 m freestyle
Mediterranean Games
Gold medal – first place	1997 Bari	200 m freestyle
Gold medal – first place	1997 Bari	4×100 m freestyle
Gold medal – first place	1997 Bari	4×200 m freestyle
Gold medal – first place	1997 Bari	4×100 m medley
Gold medal – first place	2005 Almería	400 m freestyle

Massimiliano Edgar "Massi" Rosolino (born 11 July 1978) is an Italian retired competitive swimmer.

== Biography ==
Born in Naples to an Italian father, Salvatore, and an Australian mother, Carolyn, he moved to Australia at the age of three, coming back to Italy at six. Rosolino declared about his beginnings as a swimmer:

I learned to float by sheer chance at the age of 4. Instead of the common arm floating bands, they made me swim with a headboard. Unfortunately it had a hole, and by the time I finally got out of the small and deep pool, the headboard had drowned... The first real swimming course I took was when I was 6 years old, and after that, lesson by lesson, I got to the pre-competition level. I always had a hard life, even though I was physically well-built, I always had to fight to become number 1, and even though I won a lot of races, I remember every race with emotion: the first regional championships, the national ones, the Young Europeans, and of course all the stomach aches I had.

In 2002 he moved back to Australia to train with coach Ian Pope at the Melbourne Vicentre Club.

Rosolino represented Italy in all of the four editions of the Olympic Games since 1996. At the 2000 Olympic Games in Sydney, he became the second Olympic champion ever in the history of Italian swimming as he won the gold medal in the 200 m individual medley (1:58.98, then Olympic and national record). He won two more medals: a silver medal in the 400 m freestyle setting the current European record (3:43.40) behind Ian Thorpe, and a bronze medal in the 200 m freestyle (1:46.65) behind Pieter van den Hoogenband and Ian Thorpe. At the 2004 Olympic Games in Athens, Rosolino won a bronze medal with the Italian team in the 4×200 m freestyle relay.

Rosolino is the most successful athlete in the history of Italian swimming, with an overall count of 60 international medals. He became world champion in the 200 m individual medley at the 2001 World Championships in Fukuoka. He also won 3 silver medals and a bronze medal through 5 editions of the World Long Course Championships. He won a gold medal (4×200 m freestyle relay), 2 silver medals and 7 bronze medals at the World Short Course Championships; since 1995 he won 21 medals at the European LC Championships and 20 medals at the European Short Course Swimming Championships, becoming European champion 14 times (7 long course, 7 short course).

== Personal life ==
In 2006, during the third edition of the Rai 1 television variety show Ballando con le stelle, he met the Russian dance teacher Natalia Titova, with whom he began a relationship. The couple has two daughters.

== Personal bests ==
Rosolino's personal bests are:

- 100 m freestyle LC: 49.35 r (2007; World Championships in Melbourne).
- 200 m freestyle LC: 1:46.60 sf (2000, Italian record; Olympic Games in Sydney).
- 400 m freestyle LC: 3:43.40 (2000, European record; Olympic Games in Sydney).
- 800 m freestyle LC: 7:50.40 (2005).
- 1500 m freestyle LC: 15:09.28 (2001).
- 50 m breaststroke LC: 29.29 (2004).
- 100 m breaststroke LC: 1:03.81 (2003).
- 200 m individual medley LC: 1:58.98 (2000; Olympic Games in Sydney).
- 400 m individual medley LC: 4:17.30 (2003; World Championships in Barcelona).

== See also ==
- Italian swimmers multiple medalists at the international competitions
- Walk of Fame of Italian sport
