= Jacob Carstensen =

Danish swimmer (born 1978)

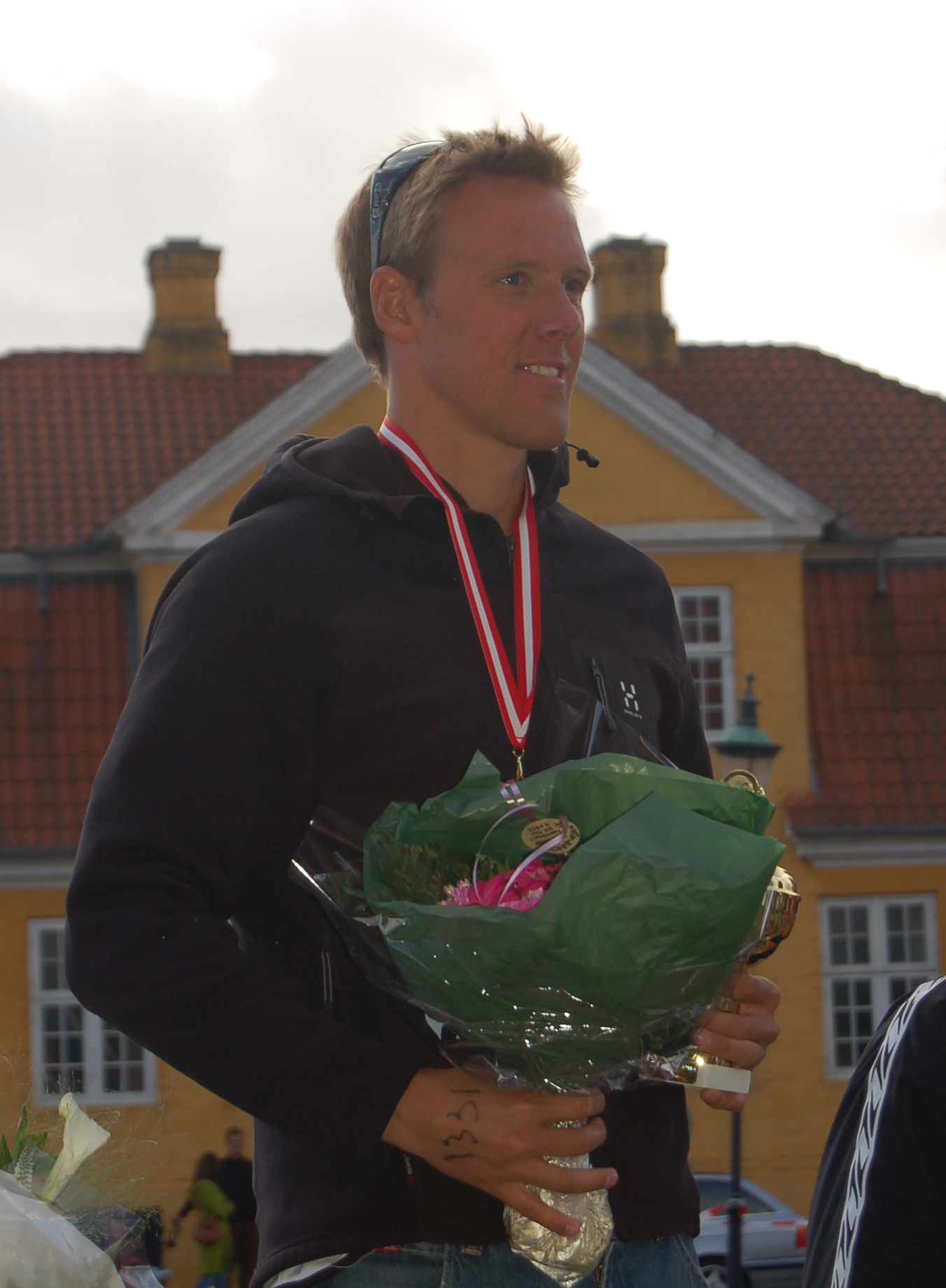
- Jacob Carstensen (2009)

Personal information
- Full name: Jacob Frilund Carstensen
- Nationality: Denmark
- Born: 10 September 1978 (age 47) Kastrup, Tårnby
- Height: 1.93 m (6 ft 4 in)
- Weight: 85 kg (187 lb)

Sport
- Sport: Swimming
- Strokes: Freestyle
- Club: Sædding-Guldager, Esbjerg
Medal record
World Championships (SC)
Gold medal – first place	1997 Gothenburg	400 m freestyle
Bronze medal – third place	2002 Moscow	400 m medley
European Championships (SC)
Silver medal – second place	2002 Riesa	400 m medley
Bronze medal – third place	1998 Sheffield	200 m freestyle
Bronze medal – third place	1998 Sheffield	400 m freestyle
Bronze medal – third place	2001 Antwerp	400 m freestyle
Bronze medal – third place	2001 Antwerp	400 m medley

Jacob Carstensen (born 10 September 1978 in Kastrup, Tårnby) is a former freestyle swimmer from Denmark, who competed in three consequentive Summer Olympics for his native country, starting in 1996. He won the world title in the 400m Freestyle at the 1997 FINA Short Course World Championships (25m) in Gothenburg.
