= Paul Palmer (swimmer) =

British swimmer (born 1974)

Personal information
- Full name: Paul Rory Palmer
- National team: Great Britain
- Born: 18 October 1974 (age 51) Lincoln, Lincolnshire, England
- Height: 2.00 m (6 ft 7 in)
- Weight: 95 kg (209 lb; 15.0 st)

Sport
- Sport: Swimming
- Strokes: Freestyle
- Club: City of Lincoln Pentaqua
Medal record
Men's swimming
Representing Great Britain
Olympic Games
Silver medal – second place	1996 Atlanta	400 m freestyle
World Championships (LC)
Bronze medal – third place	1998 Perth	400 m freestyle
Bronze medal – third place	1998 Perth	4×200 m freestyle
World Championships (SC)
Silver medal – second place	1999 Hong Kong	4×200 m freestyle
Silver medal – second place	2000 Athens	400 m freestyle
Silver medal – second place	2000 Athens	4×200 m freestyle
Bronze medal – third place	1993 Palma	400 m freestyle
Bronze medal – third place	1997 Gothenburg	4×200 m freestyle
European Championships (LC)
Gold medal – first place	1997 Seville	200 m freestyle
Gold medal – first place	1997 Seville	4×200 m freestyle
Gold medal – first place	1999 Istanbul	400 m freestyle
Silver medal – second place	1993 Sheffield	400 m freestyle
Silver medal – second place	1995 Vienna	400 m freestyle
Silver medal – second place	1999 Istanbul	200 m freestyle
Silver medal – second place	1999 Istanbul	4×200 m freestyle
Bronze medal – third place	1997 Seville	400 m freestyle
Bronze medal – third place	2000 Helsinki	200 m freestyle
Bronze medal – third place	2000 Helsinki	400 m freestyle
European Championships (SC)
Silver medal – second place	2000 Valencia	400 m freestyle
Bronze medal – third place	2000 Valencia	200 m freestyle

Paul Palmer (born 18 October 1974 in Lincoln, England) is a former international freestyle swimmer for England and Great Britain.

== Early life ==
He lived on Longdales Road, and attended Lincoln Christ's Hospital School.

== Swimming career ==
Coached by Ian Turner at the City of Lincoln Pentaqua Swimming Club, Palmer qualified for the 200 m, 400 m and 1500 m freestyle at the 1992 Barcelona Olympics, finishing a respectable 9th position (winning the "B" final) in the 200 m, and 10th position in the 400 m. After this success, in order to increase his chances of a medal at the following Atlanta games, Palmer relocated to Bath, along with Turner. Training in a 50 m pool, alongside other Olympic hopefuls at the performance centre allowed Palmer to further increase his swimming skills.

Palmer won the silver medal in the 400 m freestyle at the 1996 Summer Olympics in Atlanta, Georgia. A year later, at the 1997 European Aquatics Championships in Seville, he won gold in the 200 m freestyle.

He won the 2001 British Championship in the 100 metres freestyle, was six times winner of the 200 metres freestyle (1993, 1995, 1998–2001) and a six times winner of the 400 metres freestyle in (1992, 1993, 1998–2001).

== See also ==
- List of Olympic medalists in swimming (men)
