= Dimitrios Manganas =

Greek swimmer

Personal information
- Born: February 24, 1978 (age 48)

Sport
- Sport: Swimming
Medal record
Representing Greece
European Championships
Bronze medal – third place	2006 Budapest	4x200m freestyle relay
Mediterranean Games
Gold medal – first place	2001 Tunis	4x200m freestyle relay

Dimitrios Manganas (born 24 February 1978) is a Greek former swimmer who competed in the 1996 Summer Olympics, in the 2000 Summer Olympics, and in the 2004 Summer Olympics.
