= Swimming at the 1998 World Aquatics Championships – Men's 1500 metre freestyle =

Men's 1500 metre freestyle at the 1998 FINA World Championships
- Dates: 17 January 1998 (heats); 18 January 1998 (final)
- Competitors: 20 from 14 nations
- Winning time: 14 minutes 51.70 seconds

Medalists
gold medal	Grant Hackett	Australia
silver medal	Emiliano Brembilla	Italy
bronze medal	Daniel Kowalski	Australia

The final of the men's 1500 metres freestyle event at the 1998 World Aquatics Championships was held on Sunday 18 January in Perth, Western Australia.

== Finals ==
Rank	Athlete	Time
Gold medal	Grant Hackett (AUS)	14:51.70
Silver medal	Emiliano Brembilla (ITA)	15:00.59
Bronze medal	Daniel Kowalski (AUS)	15:03.94
4	Igor Snitko (UKR)	15:04.30
5	Ryk Neethling (RSA)	15:12.50
6	Luiz Lima (BRA)	15:17.55
7	Denys Zavhorodnyy (UKR)	15:22.43
8	Tyler Painter (USA)	15:23.40

== Qualifying heats ==
- Held on Saturday 17 January 1998

Rank	Athlete	Time
1	Ryk Neethling (RSA)	15:11.52
2	Denys Zavhorodnyy (UKR)	15:11.86
3	Igor Snitko (UKR)	15:11.90
4	Daniel Kowalski (AUS)	15:19.31
5	Emiliano Brembilla (ITA)	15:19.36
6	Grant Hackett (AUS)	15:19.38
6	Luiz Lima (BRA)	15:19.38
8	Tyler Painter (USA)	15:20.18
9	Ian Wilson (GBR)	15:23.72
10	Masato Hirano (JPN)	15:28.79
11	Marco Formentini (ITA)	15:29.22
12	Graeme Smith (GBR)	15:35.71
13	Sergi Roure (ESP)	15:41.36
14	Torlarp Sethsothorn (THA)	15:42.78
15	Frederik Hviid (ESP)	15:43.80
16	Tim Siciliano (USA)	15:49.09
17	Yevgeni Bezruchenko (RUS)	15:57.75
18	Scott Cameron (NZL)	15:57.90
19	Jure Bučar (SLO)	16:03.77
20	Mark Kwok (HKG)	16:03.96

== See also ==
- 1996 Men's Olympic Games 1,500m Freestyle (Atlanta)
- 1997 Men's World SC Championships 1,500m Freestyle (Gothenburg)
- 1997 Men's European LC Championships 1,500m Freestyle (Seville)
- 2000 Men's Olympic Games 1,500m Freestyle (Sydney)
