= 1997 FINA Short Course World Championships – Men's 1500m freestyle =

The finals of the men's 1500 metres freestyle event at the 1997 FINA Short Course World Championships were held on the last day of the competition, on Sunday 20 April 1997 in Gothenburg, Sweden.

== Finals ==
RANK	FINAL A	TIME
	Grant Hackett (AUS)	14:39.54
	Jörg Hoffmann (GER)	14:40.67
	Graeme Smith (GBR)	14:46.85
4.	Chad Carvin (USA)	14:56.10
5.	Ian Wilson (GBR)	14:56.29
6.	Luiz Lima (BRA)	15:00.32
7.	Denys Zavhorodnyy (UKR)	15:07.54
8.	Alexei Butsenin (RUS)	15:09.59

RANK	NON-QUALIFIERS	TIME
9.	Masato Hirano (JPN)	15:12.21
10.	Mark Johnston (CAN)	15:12.69
11.	Alexandre Angelotti (BRA)	15:12.85
12.	Aleksey Akatyev (RUS)	15:17.21
13.	Brent Sallee (CAN)	15:18.47
14.	Ricardo Monasterio (VEN)	15:20.41
15.	Trent Steed (AUS)	15:21.41
16.	Torlarp Sethsothorn (THA)	15:22.44
17.	Mattias Olshed (SWE)	15:23.63
18.	Agustín Fiorilli (ARG)	15:24.36
19.	Jonas Lundström (SWE)	15:24.54
20.	Sergei Mikhnovets (BLR)	15:31.79
21.	Anders Jensen (DEN)	15:33.04
22.	Ryno Markgraaff (RSA)	15:35.58
23.	Milan Malena (CZE)	15:40.81
24.	Scott Cameron (NZL)	15:46.24
25.	Fausto Mauri (SUI)	15:52.59
26.	Gustav Stander (RSA)	15:53.70
27.	Pablo Banfi (CHI)	15:55.70

== See also ==
- 1996 Men's Olympic Games 1500m Freestyle
- 1997 Men's European LC Championships 1500m Freestyle
