= 1500 metres freestyle =

The 1500 metres freestyle is an event in competitive swimming. World records are ratified by World Aquatics (formerly FINA). The current long course world record holders are Germany's Johannes Liebmann and the US' Katie Ledecky, while the current short course world record holders are Germany's Florian Wellbrock, and Ledecky.

The men's event was first contested at the Olympic Games in 1908, while the women's event was introduced in 2020; the current Olympic champions are the US' Bobby Finke and Ledecky. The men's event has been contested at the World Aquatics Championships since the inaugural championships in 1973, while the women's event has been contested since 2001; the current world champions (long course) are Tunisia's Ahmed Jaouadi, and Ledecky. The men's event has been contested at the World Aquatics Swimming Championships (25m) since the inaugural championships in 1993, while the women's event has been contested since 2022; the current world champions (short course) are Jaouadi, and Germany's Isabel Gose.

== World record progression ==
=== Men long course ===
| # | Time | | Name | Nationality | Date | Meet | Location | Ref |
|---|---|---|---|---|---|---|---|---|
| 1 | 22:48.4 | | Henry Taylor | Great Britain | 25 July 1908 | Olympic Games | London, United Kingdom | |
| 2 | 22:00.0 | | George Hodgson | Canada | 10 July 1912 | Olympic Games | Stockholm, Sweden | |
| 3 | 21:35.3 | | Arne Borg | Sweden | 8 July 1923 | - | Gothenburg, Sweden | |
| 4 | 21:15.0 | | Arne Borg | Sweden | 30 January 1924 | - | Sydney, Australia | |
| 5 | 21:11.4 | | Arne Borg | Sweden | 13 July 1924 | - | Paris, France | |
| 6 | 20:06.6 | | Boy Charlton | Australia | 15 July 1924 | Olympic Games | Paris, France | |
| 7 | 20:04.4 | | Arne Borg | Sweden | 18 August 1926 | - | Budapest, Hungary | |
| 8 | 19:07.2 | | Arne Borg | Sweden | 2 September 1927 | European Championships | Bologna, Italy | |
| 9 | 18:58.8 | | Tomikatsu Amano | Japan | 10 August 1938 | - | Tokyo, Japan | |
| 10 | 18:35.7 | | Shiro Hashizume | Japan | 16 August 1949 | - | Los Angeles, United States | |
| 11 | 18:19.0 | | Hironoshin Furuhashi | Japan | 16 August 1949 | - | Los Angeles, United States | |
| 12 | 18:05.9 | | George Breen | United States | 3 May 1956 | - | New Haven, United States | |
| 13 | 17:59.5 | | Murray Rose | Australia | 30 October 1956 | - | Melbourne, Australia | |
| 14 | 17:52.9 | | George Breen | United States | 5 December 1956 | - | Melbourne, Australia | |
| 15 | 17:28.7 | | John Konrads | Australia | 22 February 1958 | - | Melbourne, Australia | |
| 16 | 17:11.0 | | John Konrads | Australia | 27 February 1960 | - | Sydney, Australia | |
| 17 | 17:05.5 | | Roy Saari | United States | 17 August 1963 | - | Tokyo, Japan | |
| 18 | 17:01.8 | | Murray Rose | Australia | 2 August 1964 | - | Los Altos, United States | |
| 19 | 16:58.7 | | Roy Saari | United States | 2 September 1964 | - | New York City, United States | |
| 20 | 16:58.6 | | Stephen Krause | United States | 15 August 1965 | - | Maumee, United States | |
| 21 | 16:41.6 | | Mike Burton | United States | 21 August 1966 | - | Lincoln, United States | |
| 22 | 16:34.1 | | Mike Burton | United States | 13 August 1967 | US National Championships | Oak Park, United States | |
| 23 | 16:28.1 | | Guillermo Echevarria | Mexico | 7 July 1968 | Santa Clara Invitational | Santa Clara, United States | |
| 24 | 16:08.6 | | Mike Burton | United States | 3 September 1968 | US Olympic Trials | Long Beach, United States | |
| 25 | 16:04.5 | | Mike Burton | United States | 17 August 1969 | US National Championships | Louisville, United States | |
| 26 | 15:57.10 | | John Kinsella | United States | 23 August 1970 | US National Championships | Los Angeles, United States | |
| 27 | 15:52.91 | | Rick DeMont | United States | 6 August 1972 | US Olympic Trials | Chicago, United States | |
| 28 | 15:52.58 | | Mike Burton | United States | 4 September 1972 | Olympic Games | Munich, West Germany | |
| 29 | 15:37.80 | | Stephen Holland | Australia | 5 August 1973 | Pre World Championship meet | Brisbane, Australia | |
| 30 | 15:31.85 | | Stephen Holland | Australia | 8 September 1973 | World Championships | Belgrade, Yugoslavia | |
| 31 | 15:31.75 | | Tim Shaw | United States | 25 August 1974 | US National Championships | Concord, United States | |
| 32 | 15:27.79 | | Stephen Holland | Australia | 25 January 1975 | New Zealand Games | Christchurch, New Zealand | |
| 33 | 15:20.91 | | Tim Shaw | United States | 21 June 1975 | US World Championship Trials | Long Beach, United States | |
| 34 | 15:10.89 | | Stephen Holland | Australia | 27 February 1976 | Australian Championships | Sydney, Australia | |
| 35 | 15:06.66 | | Brian Goodell | United States | 21 June 1976 | US Olympic Trials | Long Beach, United States | |
| 36 | 15:02.40 | | Brian Goodell | United States | 20 July 1976 | Olympic Games | Montreal, Canada | |
| 37 | 14:58.27 | | Vladimir Salnikov | Soviet Union | 22 July 1980 | Olympic Games | Moscow, Soviet Union | |
| 38 | 14:56.35 | | Vladimir Salnikov | Soviet Union | 13 March 1982 | Soviet Union vs East Germany Dual Meet | Moscow, Soviet Union | |
| 39 | 14:54.76 | | Vladimir Salnikov | Soviet Union | 22 February 1983 | Soviet Union Winter Championships | Moscow, Soviet Union | |
| - | 14:53.59 | (Note: Glen Housman's time of 14:53.59 was not ratified as a world record due to an electronic timing error.) | Glen Housman | Australia | 13 December 1989 | Australian Trials | Adelaide, Australia | |
| 40 | 14:50.36 | | Jörg Hoffmann | Germany | 13 January 1991 | World Championships | Perth, Australia | |
| 41 | 14:48.40 | | Kieren Perkins | Australia | 5 April 1992 | Australian Championships | Canberra, Australia | |
| 42 | 14:43.48 | | Kieren Perkins | Australia | 31 July 1992 | Olympic Games | Barcelona, Spain | |
| 43 | 14:41.66 | | Kieren Perkins | Australia | 24 August 1994 | Commonwealth Games | Victoria, Canada | |
| 44 | 14:34.56 | | Grant Hackett | Australia | 29 July 2001 | World Championships | Fukuoka, Japan | |
| 45 | 14:34.14 | | Sun Yang | China | 31 July 2011 | World Championships | Shanghai, China | |
| 46 | 14:31.02 | | Sun Yang | China | 4 August 2012 | Olympic Games | London, United Kingdom | |
| 47 | 14:30.67 | | Bobby Finke | United States | 4 August 2024 | Olympic Games | Paris, France | |
| 48 | 14:26.79 | | Johannes Liebmann | Germany | 15 August 2026 | European Championships | Paris, France | |

Legend: # – Record awaiting ratification by World Aquatics; e – equalled existing record;
Records not set in finals: h – heat; sf – semifinal; r – relay 1st leg; rh – relay heat 1st leg; b – B final; † – en route to final mark; so – swim-off; tt – time trial

=== Men short course ===
| # | Time | Name | Nationality | Date | Meet | Location | Ref |
|---|---|---|---|---|---|---|---|
| 1 | 14:32.40 | Kieren Perkins | Australia | 2 February 1992 | Swimming Australia Grand Prix | Canberra, Australia | |
| 2 | 14:26.52 | Kieren Perkins | Australia | 14 July 1993 | - | Auckland, New Zealand | |
| 3 | 14:19.55 | Grant Hackett | Australia | 27 September 1998 | Australian Championships | Perth, Australia | |
| 4 | 14:10.10 | Grant Hackett | Australia | 7 August 2001 | Australian Championships | Perth, Australia | |
| 5 | 14:08.06 | Gregorio Paltrinieri | Italy | 4 December 2015 | European Championships | Netanya, Israel | |
| 6 | 14:06.88 | Florian Wellbrock | Germany | 21 December 2021 | World Championships | Abu Dhabi, United Arab Emirates | |

Legend: # – Record awaiting ratification by World Aquatics; e – equalled existing record;
Records not set in finals: h – heat; sf – semifinal; r – relay 1st leg; rh – relay heat 1st leg; b – B final; † – en route to final mark; so – swim-off; tt – time trial

=== Women long course ===
| # | Time | | Name | Nationality | Date | Meet | Location | Ref |
|---|---|---|---|---|---|---|---|---|
| 1 | 25:06.6 | | Helen Wainwright | United States | 19 August 1922 | - | New York City, United States | |
| 2 | 24:07.6 | | Ethel McGary | United States | 31 December 1925 | - | Coral Gables, United States | |
| 3 | 24:00.2 | | Edith Mayne | Great Britain | 15 September 1926 | - | Exmouth, United Kingdom | |
| 4 | 23:44.6 | | Martha Norelius | United States | 28 July 1927 | - | Massapequa, United States | |
| 5 | 23:17.2 | | Helene Madison | United States | 15 July 1931 | - | New York City, United States | |
| 6 | 22:36.7 | | Grete Frederiksen | Denmark | 26 June 1936 | - | Copenhagen, Denmark | |
| 7 | 21:45.7 | | Ragnhild Hveger | Denmark | 3 July 1938 | - | Helsinki, Finland | |
| 8 | 21:10.1 | | Ragnhild Hveger | Denmark | 11 August 1940 | - | Helsinki, Finland | |
| 9 | 20:57.0 | | Ragnhild Hveger | Denmark | 20 August 1941 | - | Copenhagen, Denmark | |
| 10 | 20:46.5 | | Lenie de Nijs | Netherlands | 23 July 1955 | - | Utrecht, Netherlands | |
| 11 | 20:22.8 | | Jans Koster | Netherlands | 21 August 1956 | - | Utrecht, Netherlands | |
| 12 | 20:03.1 | | Jans Koster | Netherlands | 27 July 1957 | - | Hilversum, Netherlands | |
| 13 | 19:25.7 | | Ilsa Konrads | Australia | 13 January 1960 | - | Sydney, Australia | |
| 14 | 19:23.6 | | Jane Cederqvist | Sweden | 8 September 1960 | - | Uppsala, Sweden | |
| 15 | 19:02.8 | | Margareta Rylander | Sweden | 27 June 1961 | - | Uppsala, Sweden | |
| 16 | 18:44.0 | | Carolyn House | United States | 16 August 1962 | - | Chicago, United States | |
| 17 | 18:30.5 | | Patty Caretto | United States | 30 July 1964 | - | Los Altos, United States | |
| 18 | 18:23.7 | | Patty Caretto | United States | 12 August 1965 | - | Los Altos, United States | |
| 19 | 18:12.9 | | Patty Caretto | United States | 21 August 1966 | - | Lincoln, United States | |
| 20 | 18:11.1 | | Debbie Meyer | United States | 9 July 1967 | Santa Clara Invitational | Santa Clara, United States | |
| 21 | 17:50.2 | | Debbie Meyer | United States | 20 August 1967 | AAU Nationals | Philadelphia, United States | |
| 22 | 17:31.2 | | Debbie Meyer | United States | 21 August 1968 | - | Los Angeles, United States | |
| 23 | 17:19.9 | | Debbie Meyer | United States | 17 August 1969 | AAU Nationals | Louisville, United States | |
| 24 | 17:19.20 | | Cathy Calhoun | United States | 28 August 1971 | AAU Nationals | Houston, United States | |
| 25 | 17:00.6 | | Shane Gould | Australia | 12 December 1971 | - | Sydney, Australia | |
| 26 | 16:56.9 | | Shane Gould | Australia | 11 February 1973 | Australian Championships | Adelaide, Australia | |
| 27 | 16:54.14 | | Jo Harshbarger | United States | 25 August 1973 | USA World Championship Trials | Louisville, United States | |
| 28 | 16:49.9 | | Jennifer Turrall | Australia | 9 December 1973 | Top-level meet | Sydney, Australia | |
| 29 | 16:48.2 | | Jennifer Turrall | Australia | 9 January 1974 | NSW State Championships | Sydney, Australia | |
| 30 | 16:43.4 | | Jennifer Turrall | Australia | 13 July 1974 | - | Sydney, Australia | |
| 31 | 16:39.28 | | Jennifer Turrall | Australia | 3 August 1974 | Los Angeles Invitational | Los Angeles, United States | |
| 32 | 16:33.94 | | Jennifer Turrall | Australia | 25 August 1974 | AAU Nationals | Concord, United States | |
| 33 | 16:24.60 | | Alice Browne | United States | 21 August 1977 | AAU Nationals | Mission Viejo, United States | |
| 34 | 16:14.93 | | Tracey Wickham | Australia | 8 February 1978 | Invitational | Brisbane, Australia | |
| 35 | 16:06.63 | | Tracey Wickham | Australia | 25 February 1979 | Australian Championships | Perth, Australia | |
| 36 | 16:04.49 | | Kim Linehan | United States | 19 August 1979 | AAU Nationals | Fort Lauderdale, United States | |
| 37 | 16:00.73 | | Janet Evans | United States | 31 July 1987 | USA Nationals & Pan Pacific Trials | Orlando, United States | |
| 38 | 15:52.10 | | Janet Evans | United States | 26 March 1988 | USA Spring Nationals | Orlando, United States | |
| 39 | 15:42.54 | | Kate Ziegler | United States | 17 June 2007 | TYR Meet of Champions | Mission Viejo, United States | |
| 40 | 15:36.53 | | Katie Ledecky | United States | 30 July 2013 | World Championships | Barcelona, Spain | |
| 41 | 15:34.23 | | Katie Ledecky | United States | 19 June 2014 | Woodlands Senior Invitational Meet | Shenandoah, United States | |
| 42 | 15:28.36 | | Katie Ledecky | United States | 24 August 2014 | Pan Pacific Championships | Gold Coast, Australia | |
| 43 | 15:27.71 | h | Katie Ledecky | United States | 3 August 2015 | World Championships | Kazan, Russia | |
| 44 | 15:25.48 | | Katie Ledecky | United States | 4 August 2015 | World Championships | Kazan, Russia | |
| 45 | 15:20.48 | | Katie Ledecky | United States | 16 May 2018 | TYR Pro Swim Series | Indianapolis, United States | |

Legend: # – Record awaiting ratification by World Aquatics; e – equalled existing record;
Records not set in finals: h – heat; sf – semifinal; r – relay 1st leg; rh – relay heat 1st leg; b – B final; † – en route to final mark; so – swim-off; tt – time trial

=== Women short course ===
| # | Time | Name | Nationality | Date | Meet | Location | Ref |
|---|---|---|---|---|---|---|---|
| 1 | 15:43.31 | Petra Schneider | East Germany | Jan 10, 1982 | - | Gainesville, United States | |
| 2 | 15:42.39 | Laure Manaudou | France | Nov 20, 2004 | Regional meet | La Roche-sur-Yon, France | |
| 3 | 15:32.90 | Kate Ziegler | United States | Oct 12, 2007 | Alex Athletics Jubiläums Challenge | Essen, Germany | |
| 4 | 15:28.65 | Lotte Friis | Denmark | Nov 29, 2009 | Local Club Meet | Copenhagen, Denmark | |
| 5 | 15:26.95 | Mireia Belmonte | Spain | Nov 29, 2013 | Spanish Championships | Castelló de la Plana, Spain | |
| 6 | 15:22.68 | Lauren Boyle | New Zealand | Aug 9, 2014 | Wellington Winter Championships | Wellington, New Zealand | |
| 7 | 15:19.71 | Mireia Belmonte | Spain | Dec 12, 2014 | Spanish Championships | Sabadell, Spain | |
| 8 | 15:18.01 | Sarah Köhler | Germany | Nov 16, 2019 | German Championships | Berlin, Germany | |
| 9 | 15:08.24 | Katie Ledecky | United States | Oct 29, 2022 | FINA World Cup | Toronto, Canada | |

Legend: # – Record awaiting ratification by World Aquatics; e – equalled existing record;
Records not set in finals: h – heat; sf – semifinal; r – relay 1st leg; rh – relay heat 1st leg; b – B final; † – en route to final mark; so – swim-off; tt – time trial

== All-time top 25 ==
Tables show data for two definitions of "Top 25" - the top 25 1500 m freestyle times and the top 25 athletes:
- denotes top performance for athletes in the top 25 1500 m freestyle times
- denotes lesser performances, still in the top 25 1500 m freestyle times, by repeat athletes
- denotes top performance (only) for other top 25 athletes who fall outside the top 25 1500 m freestyle times

=== Men long course ===
- Correct as of August 2026

| Ath.# | Perf.# | Time | Athlete | Nation | Date | Place | Ref. |
|---|---|---|---|---|---|---|---|
| 1 | 1 | 14:26.79 | Johannes Liebmann | Germany | 15 August 2026 | Paris | |
| 2 | 2 | 14:30.67 | Bobby Finke | United States | 4 August 2024 | Paris | |
| 3 | 3 | 14:31.02 | Sun Yang | China | 4 August 2012 | London | |
| 4 | 4 | 14:31.54 | Ahmed Hafnaoui | Tunisia | 30 July 2023 | Fukuoka | |
| | 5 | 14:31.59 | Finke #2 | | 30 July 2023 | Fukuoka | |
| 5 | 6 | 14:32.80 | Gregorio Paltrinieri | Italy | 25 June 2022 | Budapest | |
| | 7 | 14:33.10 | Paltrinieri #2 | | 13 August 2020 | Rome | |
| 6 | 8 | 14:33.97 | Samuel Short | Australia | 15 August 2026 | Irvine | |
| | 9 | 14:34.04 | Paltrinieri #3 | | 18 May 2016 | London | |
| 7 | 10 | 14:34.07 | Daniel Wiffen | Ireland | 18 February 2024 | Doha | |
| | 11 | 14:34.14 | Sun #2 | | 31 July 2011 | Shanghai | |
| 8 | 12 | 14:34.41 | Ahmed Jaouadi | Tunisia | 3 August 2025 | Singapore | |
| | 13 | 14:34.55 | Paltrinieri #4 | | 4 August 2024 | Paris | |
| 9 | 14 | 14:34.56 | Grant Hackett | Australia | 29 July 2001 | Fukuoka | |
| | 15 | 14:34.57 | Paltrinieri #5 | | 13 August 2016 | Rio de Janeiro | |
| 10 | 16 | 14:34.89 | Florian Wellbrock | Germany | 21 April 2023 | Berlin | |
| | 17 | 14:34.91 | Wiffen #2 | | 14 April 2023 | Stockholm | |
| | 18 | 14:35.43 | Sun #3 | | 18 November 2010 | Guangzhou | |
| 11 | 19 | 14:35.69 | Sven Schwarz | Germany | 3 August 2025 | Singapore | |
| | 20 | 14:35.79 | Wiffen #3 | | 11 August 2023 | Dublin | |
| | 21 | 14:35.85 | Paltrinieri #6 | | 30 July 2017 | Budapest | |
| 12 | 22 | 14:36.10 | Mykhailo Romanchuk | Ukraine | 16 August 2022 | Rome | |
| | 23 | 14:36.15 | Wellbrock #2 | | 5 August 2018 | Glasgow | |
| | 24 | 14:36.25 | Wellbrock #3 | | 4 May 2025 | Berlin | |
| | 25 | 14:36.45 | Wellbrock #4 | | 18 April 2021 | Berlin | |
| 13 | | 14:37.28 | Oussama Mellouli | Tunisia | 2 August 2009 | Rome | |
| 14 | | 14:39.03 | Oliver Klemet | Germany | 4 May 2025 | Berlin | |
| 15 | | 14:39.45 | Zalán Sárkány | Hungary | 15 August 2026 | Paris | |
| 16 | | 14:39.48 | Connor Jaeger | United States | 13 August 2016 | Rio de Janeiro | |
| 17 | | 14:39.54 | Mack Horton | Australia | 13 April 2016 | Adelaide | |
| 18 | | 14:39.63 | Ryan Cochrane | Canada | 4 August 2012 | London | |
| 19 | | 14:40.28 | Lukas Märtens | Germany | 25 March 2022 | Magdeburg | |
| 20 | | 14:40.86 | Gabriele Detti | Italy | 13 August 2016 | Rio de Janeiro | |
| 21 | | 14:40.91 | Dávid Betlehem | Hungary | 4 August 2024 | Paris | |
| 22 | | 14:41.13 | Yuriy Prilukov | Russia | 15 August 2008 | Beijing | |
| 23 | | 14:41.22 | Kuzey Tunçelli | Turkey | 4 August 2024 | Paris | |
| 24 | | 14:41.66 | Kieren Perkins | Australia | 24 August 1994 | Victoria | |
| 25 | | 14:42.42 | Zhang Zhanshuo | China | 22 September 2026 | Tokyo | |

=== Men short course ===
- Correct as of November 2026

| Ath.# | Perf.# | Time | Athlete | Nation | Date | Place | Ref. |
|---|---|---|---|---|---|---|---|
| 1 | 1 | 14:06.88 | Florian Wellbrock | Germany | 21 December 2021 | Abu Dhabi | |
| 2 | 2 | 14:08.06 | Gregorio Paltrinieri | Italy | 4 December 2015 | Netanya | |
| 3 | 3 | 14:09.11 | Daniel Wiffen | Ireland | 7 December 2023 | Otopeni | |
| 4 | 4 | 14:09.14 | Mykhailo Romanchuk | Ukraine | 16 December 2018 | Hangzhou | |
| | 5 | 14:09.87 | Paltrinieri #2 | | 16 December 2018 | Hangzhou | |
| | 6 | 14:09.88 | Wellbrock #2 | | 4 November 2021 | Kazan | |
| 5 | 7 | 14:10.10 | Grant Hackett | Australia | 7 August 2001 | Perth | |
| 6 | 8 | 14:10.94 | Ahmed Hafnaoui | Tunisia | 21 December 2021 | Abu Dhabi | |
| | 9 | 14:11.47 | Romanchuk #2 | | 21 December 2021 | Abu Dhabi | |
| | 10 | 14:13.07 | Paltrinieri #3 | | 4 November 2021 | Kazan | |
| | 11 | 14:13.96 | Wiffen #2 | | 4 December 2025 | Lublin | |
| 7 | 12 | 14:14.16 | Kaito Tabuchi | Japan | 10 October 2026 | Saga | |
| | 13 | 14:14.45 | Wiffen #3 | | 10 December 2022 | Glasgow | |
| | 14 | 14:14.59 | Romanchuk #3 | | 15 December 2017 | Copenhagen | |
| 8 | 15 | 14:15.10 | Samuel Short | Australia | 2 October 2026 | Sydney | |
| | 16 | 14:15.49 | Romanchuk #4 | | 22 October 2016 | Singapore | |
| 9 | 17 | 14:15.51 | Park Tae-hwan | South Korea | 11 December 2016 | Windsor | |
| 9 | 17 | 14:15.51 | Zalán Sárkány | Hungary | 4 December 2025 | Lublin | |
| | 19 | 14:16.10 | Paltrinieri #4 | | 7 December 2014 | Doha | |
| 11 | 20 | 14:16.13 | Yuriy Prilukov | Russia | 9 December 2006 | Helsinki | |
| 12 | 21 | 14:16.40 | Ahmed Jaouadi | Tunisia | 10 December 2024 | Budapest | |
| | 22 | 14:16.88 | Paltrinieri #5 | | 13 December 2022 | Melbourne | |
| | 23 | 14:17.14 | Paltrinieri #6 | | 6 December 2019 | Glasgow | |
| | 24 | 14:17.27 | Wellbrock #3 | | 10 December 2024 | Budapest | |
| 13 | 25 | 14:18.00 | Gabriele Detti | Italy | 4 December 2015 | Netanya | |
| 14 | | 14:18.15 | Henrik Christiansen | Norway | 6 December 2019 | Glasgow | |
| 15 | | 14:18.79 | Oussama Mellouli | Tunisia | 7 December 2014 | Doha | |
| 16 | | 14:19.11 | Sacha Velly | France | 1 November 2026 | Angers | |
| 17 | | 14:19.29 | Connor Jaeger | United States | 12 December 2015 | Indianapolis | |
| 18 | | 14:19.62 | Damien Joly | France | 13 December 2022 | Melbourne | |
| 19 | | 14:19.65 | Dávid Betlehem | Hungary | 4 December 2025 | Lublin | |
| 20 | | 14:20.44 | Jan Wolfgarten | Germany | 12 December 2009 | Istanbul | |
| 21 | | 14:20.64 | Kuzey Tunçelli | Turkey | 10 December 2024 | Budapest | |
| 22 | | 14:20.66 | Sven Schwarz | Germany | 12 November 2026 | Wuppertal | |
| 23 | | 14:21.78 | David Aubry | France | 7 December 2023 | Otopeni | |
| 24 | | 14:22.47 | Zhang Lin | China | 21 February 2009 | Tokyo | |
| 25 | | 14:22.77 | David Johnston | United States | 27 August 2022 | Sydney | |

=== Women long course ===
- Correct as of August 2026

| Ath.# | Perf.# | Time | Athlete | Nation | Date | Place | Ref. |
|---|---|---|---|---|---|---|---|
| 1 | 1 | 15:20.48 | Katie Ledecky | United States | 16 May 2018 | Indianapolis | |
| | 2 | 15:23.21 | Ledecky #2 | | 14 January 2026 | Austin | |
| | 3 | 15:24.51 | Ledecky #3 | | 30 April 2025 | Fort Lauderdale | |
| | 4 | 15:25.48 | Ledecky #4 | | 4 August 2015 | Kazan | |
| | 5 | 15:25.62 | Ledecky #5 | | 29 April 2026 | Fort Lauderdale | |
| | 6 | 15:26.27 | Ledecky #6 | | 25 July 2023 | Fukuoka | |
| | 7 | 15:26.44 | Ledecky #7 | | 29 July 2025 | Singapore | |
| | 8 | 15:27.71 | Ledecky #8 | | 3 August 2015 | Kazan | |
| | 9 | 15:28.36 | Ledecky #9 | | 24 August 2014 | Gold Coast | |
| | 10 | 15:29.51 | Ledecky #10 | | 4 March 2020 | Des Moines | |
| | 11 | 15:29.64 | Ledecky #11 | | 1 July 2023 | Indianapolis | |
| | 12 | 15:30.02 | Ledecky #12 | | 31 July 2024 | Paris | |
| | 13 | 15:30.15 | Ledecky #13 | | 20 June 2022 | Budapest | |
| 2 | 14 | 15:31.79 | Simona Quadarella | Italy | 29 July 2025 | Singapore | |
| | 15 | 15:31.82 | Ledecky #14 | | 25 July 2017 | Budapest | |
| | 16 | 15:34.23 | Ledecky #15 | | 19 June 2014 | Shenandoah | |
| | 17 | 15:34.66 | Ledecky #16 | | 17 June 2026 | Indianapolis | |
| | 18 | 15:35.35 | Ledecky #17 | | 26 July 2021 | Tokyo | |
| | 19 | 15:35.65 | Ledecky #18 | | 1 June 2017 | Santa Clara | |
| | 20 | 15:35.98 | Ledecky #19 | | 7 December 2019 | Greensboro | |
| | 21 | 15:36.09 | Ledecky #20 | | 12 August 2026 | Irvine | |
| | 22 | 15:36.53 | Ledecky #21 | | 30 July 2013 | Barcelona | |
| | 23 | 15:36.68 | Ledecky #22 | | 28 July 2025 | Singapore | |
| | 24 | 15:36.76 | Ledecky #23 | | 7 June 2025 | Indianapolis | |
| | 25 | 15:36.87 | Ledecky #24 | | 16 February 2025 | Plantation | |
| 3 | | 15:38.62 | Lani Pallister | Australia | 12 August 2026 | Irvine | |
| 4 | | 15:38.88 | Lotte Friis | Denmark | 30 July 2013 | Barcelona | |
| 5 | | 15:40.14 | Lauren Boyle | New Zealand | 4 August 2015 | Kazan | |
| 6 | | 15:40.35 | Anastasiya Kirpichnikova | France (Note: Anastasiya Kirpichnikova initially represented Russia, before switching her sporting citizenship to France in April 2023. The attributed nation indicates which team she represented at the time.) | 31 July 2024 | Paris | |
| 7 | | 15:41.16 | Isabel Gose | Germany | 31 July 2024 | Paris | |
| 8 | | 15:41.41 | Erica Sullivan | United States | 28 July 2021 | Tokyo | |
| 9 | | 15:41.49 | Wang Jianjiahe | China | 26 July 2021 | Tokyo | |
| 10 | | 15:42.54 | Kate Ziegler | United States | 17 June 2007 | Mission Viejo | |
| 11 | | 15:42.91 | Sarah Köhler | Germany | 28 July 2021 | Tokyo | |
| 12 | | 15:43.94 | Li Bingjie | China | 19 May 2025 | Shenzhen | |
| 13 | | 15:44.89 | Katie Grimes | United States | 20 June 2022 | Budapest | |
| 14 | | 15:44.93 | Alessia Filippi | Italy | 28 July 2009 | Rome | |
| 15 | | 15:46.13 | Maddy Gough | Australia | 15 June 2021 | Adelaide | |
| 16 | | 15:47.09 | Boglárka Kapás | Hungary | 4 August 2015 | Kazan | |
| 17 | | 15:47.26 | Jazmin Carlin | Great Britain | 26 June 2013 | Sheffield | |
| 18 | | 15:50.89 | Mireia Belmonte | Spain | 25 July 2017 | Budapest | |
| 19 | | 15:51.68 | Delfina Pignatiello | Argentina | 15 June 2019 | Barcelona | |
| 20 | | 15:52.10 | Janet Evans | United States | 26 March 1988 | Orlando | |
| 21 | | 15:52.17 | Jessica Ashwood | Australia | 4 August 2015 | Kazan | |
| 22 | | 15:52.37 | Camelia Potec | Romania | 26 April 2009 | Montpellier | |
| 23 | | 15:52.50 | Maya Werner | Germany | 14 August 2026 | Paris | |
| 24 | | 15:53.49 | Moesha Johnson | Australia | 12 August 2026 | Irvine | |
| 25 | | 15:54.19 | Ashley Twichell | United States | 23 July 2019 | Gwangju | |

=== Women short course ===
- Correct as of November 2026

| Ath.# | Perf.# | Time | Athlete | Nation | Date | Place | Ref. |
|---|---|---|---|---|---|---|---|
| 1 | 1 | 15:08.24 | Katie Ledecky | United States | 29 October 2022 | Toronto | |
| 2 | 2 | 15:13.83 | Lani Pallister | Australia | 19 October 2025 | Westmont | |
| | 3 | 15:15.91 | Ledecky #2 | | 16 October 2026 | Charlottesville | |
| 3 | 4 | 15:18.01 | Sarah Köhler | Germany | 16 November 2019 | Berlin | |
| 4 | 5 | 15:18.30 | Anastasiya Kirpichnikova | Russia | 5 November 2021 | Kazan | |
| | 6 | 15:18.68 | Pallister #2 | | 29 September 2026 | Sydney | |
| 5 | 7 | 15:19.71 | Mireia Belmonte | Spain | 12 December 2014 | Sabadell | |
| | 8 | 15:20.12 | Kirpichnikova #2 | | 8 December 2023 | Otopeni | |
| | 9 | 15:21.43 | Pallister #3 | | 16 December 2022 | Melbourne | |
| 6 | 10 | 15:22.68 | Lauren Boyle | New Zealand | 9 August 2014 | Wellington | |
| | 11 | 15:24.63 | Pallister #4 | | 24 August 2022 | Sydney | |
| 7 | 12 | 15:24.69 | Isabel Gose | Germany | 15 December 2024 | Budapest | |
| | 13 | 15:25.50 | Gose #2 | | 19 November 2023 | Wuppertal | |
| | 14 | 15:26.08 | Kirpichnikova #3 | | 4 November 2021 | Kazan | |
| | 15 | 15:26.95 | Belmonte #2 | | 29 November 2013 | Castellón de la Plana | |
| | 16 | 15:28.33 | Pallister #5 | | 29 November 2020 | Brisbane | |
| 8 | 17 | 15:28.65 | Lotte Friis | Denmark | 28 November 2009 | Birkerød | |
| 9 | 18 | 15:29.74 | Simona Quadarella | Italy | 5 March 2021 | Rome | |
| 9 | 18 | 15:29.74 | Simona Quadarella | Italy | 24 April 2021 | Pietralata | |
| | 20 | 15:29.93 | Quadarella #3 | | 7 December 2025 | Lublin | |
| | 21 | 15:30.14 | Quadarella #4 | | 13 December 2024 | Budapest | |
| 10 | 22 | 15:30.22 | Erika Fairweather | New Zealand | 19 October 2025 | Westmont | |
| 11 | 23 | 15:31.19 | Maddy Gough | Australia | 26 September 2020 | Brisbane | |
| 12 | 24 | 15:32.90 | Kate Ziegler | United States | 12 October 2007 | Essen | |
| | 25 | 15:33.40 | Quadarella #5 | | 14 November 2024 | Riccione | |
| 13 | | 15:34.09 | Li Bingjie | China | 26 October 2026 | Beijing | |
| 14 | | 15:34.31 | Kareena Lee | Australia | 29 November 2020 | Brisbane | |
| 15 | | 15:36.43 | Martina Caramignoli | Italy | 5 March 2021 | Rome | |
| 16 | | 15:37.03 | Ichika Kajimoto | Japan | 14 November 2026 | Suzuka | |
| 17 | | 15:37.78 | Erika Villaecija | Spain | 26 November 2009 | Castellón de la Plana | |
| 18 | | 15:38.41 | Gan Ching Hwee | Singapore | 15 October 2026 | Astana | |
| 19 | | 15:38.64 | Phoebe Hines | Australia | 29 November 2020 | Brisbane | |
| 20 | | 15:40.05 | Leonie Beck | Germany | 25 October 2019 | Wuppertal | |
| 21 | | 15:40.52 | Moesha Johnson | Australia | 29 November 2020 | Brisbane | |
| 22 | | 15:41.29 | Jillian Cox | United States | 13 December 2024 | Budapest | |
| 23 | | 15:42.05 | Katie Grimes | United States | 4 November 2022 | Indianapolis | |
| 24 | | 15:42.14 | Kseniya Misharina | Russia | 10 November 2025 | Kazan | |
| 25 | | 15:42.18 | Caitlin Deans | New Zealand | 19 October 2025 | Westmont | |

== Olympic champions ==
=== Men ===
| Edition | Winner | Time | Notes | Ref. |
|---|---|---|---|---|
| (United Kingdom) London 1908 | Henry Taylor (GBR) | 22:48.4 | WR | |
| (Sweden) Stockholm 1912 | George Hodgson (CAN) | 22:00.0 | WR | |
| (Belgium) Antwerp 1920 | Norman Ross (USA) | 22:23.2 | | |
| (France) Paris 1924 | Boy Charlton (AUS) | 20:06.6 | WR | |
| (Netherlands) Amsterdam 1928 | Arne Borg (SWE) | 19:51.8 | OR | |
| (United States) Los Angeles 1932 | Kusuo Kitamura (JPN) | 19:12.4 | OR | |
| (Nazi Germany) Berlin 1936 | Noboru Terada (JPN) | 19:13.7 | | |
| (United Kingdom) London 1948 | Jimmy McLane (USA) | 19:18.5 | | |
| (Finland) Helsinki 1952 | Ford Konno (USA) | 18:30.3 | OR | |
| (Australia) Melbourne 1956 | Murray Rose (AUS) | 17:58.9 | (Note: George Breen set a world record of 17:52.9 in the heats.) | |
| (Italy) Rome 1960 | John Konrads (AUS) | 17:19.6 | OR | |
| (Japan) Tokyo 1964 | Bob Windle (AUS) | 17:01.7 | OR | |
| Mexico City 1968 | Mike Burton (USA) | 16:38.9 | OR | |
| (West Germany) Munich 1972 | Mike Burton (USA) | 15:52.58 | WR | |
| (Canada) Montreal 1976 | Brian Goodell (USA) | 15:02.40 | WR | |
| (Soviet Union) Moscow 1980 | Vladimir Salnikov (URS) | 14:58.27 | WR | |
| (United States) Los Angeles 1984 | Mike O'Brien (USA) | 15:05.20 | | |
| (South Korea) Seoul 1988 | Vladimir Salnikov (URS) | 15:00.40 | | |
| (Spain) Barcelona 1992 | Kieren Perkins (AUS) | 14:43.48 | WR | |
| (United States) Atlanta 1996 | Kieren Perkins (AUS) | 14:56.40 | | |
| (Australia) Sydney 2000 | Grant Hackett (AUS) | 14:48.33 | | |
| (Greece) Athens 2004 | Grant Hackett (AUS) | 14:43.40 | OR | |
| (China) Beijing 2008 | Oussama Mellouli (TUN) | 14:40.84 | (Note: Grant Hackett set an Olympic record of 14:38.92 in the heats.) | |
| (United Kingdom) London 2012 | Sun Yang (CHN) | 14:31.02 | WR | |
| (Brazil) Rio de Janeiro 2016 | Gregorio Paltrinieri (ITA) | 14:34.57 | | |
| (Japan) Tokyo 2020 | Bobby Finke (USA) | 14:39.65 | | |
| (France) Paris 2024 | Bobby Finke (USA) | 14:30.67 | WR | |

=== Women ===
| Edition | Winner | Time | Notes | Ref. |
|---|---|---|---|---|
| (Japan) Tokyo 2020 | Katie Ledecky (USA) | 15:37.34 | (Note: Katie Ledecky set an Olympic record of 15:35.35 in the heats.) | |
| (France) Paris 2024 | Katie Ledecky (USA) | 15:30.02 | OR | |

== World champions (long course) ==
=== Men ===
| Edition | Winner | Time | Notes | Ref. |
|---|---|---|---|---|
| (Socialist Federal Republic of Yugoslavia) Belgrade 1973 | Stephen Holland (AUS) | 15:31.85 | WR | |
| (Colombia) Cali 1975 | Tim Shaw (USA) | 15:28.92 | CR | |
| (West Germany) West Berlin 1978 | Vladimir Salnikov (URS) | 15:03.99 | CR | |
| (Ecuador) Guayaquil 1982 | Vladimir Salnikov (URS) | 15:01.77 | CR | |
| (Spain) Madrid 1986 | Rainer Henkel (FRG) | 15:05.31 | | |
| (Australia) Perth 1991 | Jörg Hoffmann (GER) | 14:50.36 | WR | |
| (Italy) Rome 1994 | Kieren Perkins (AUS) | 14:50.52 | | |
| (Australia) Perth 1998 | Grant Hackett (AUS) | 14:51.70 | | |
| (Japan) Fukuoka 2001 | Grant Hackett (AUS) | 14:34.56 | WR | |
| (Spain) Barcelona 2003 | Grant Hackett (AUS) | 14:43.14 | | |
| (Canada) Montreal 2005 | Grant Hackett (AUS) | 14:42.58 | | |
| (Australia) Melbourne 2007 | Mateusz Sawrymowicz (POL) | 14:45.94 | | |
| (Italy) Rome 2009 | Oussama Mellouli (TUN) | 14:37.28 | | |
| (China) Shanghai 2011 | Sun Yang (CHN) | 14:34.14 | WR | |
| (Spain) Barcelona 2013 | Sun Yang (CHN) | 14:41.15 | | |
| (Russia) Kazan 2015 | Gregorio Paltrinieri (ITA) | 14:39.67 | | |
| (Hungary) Budapest 2017 | Gregorio Paltrinieri (ITA) | 14:35.85 | | |
| (South Korea) Gwangju 2019 | Florian Wellbrock (GER) | 14:36.54 | | |
| (Hungary) Budapest 2022 | Gregorio Paltrinieri (ITA) | 14:32.80 | CR | |
| (Japan) Fukuoka 2023 | Ahmed Hafnaoui (TUN) | 14:31.54 | CR | |
| (Qatar) Doha 2024 | Daniel Wiffen (IRL) | 14:34.07 | | |
| Singapore 2025 | Ahmed Jaouadi (TUN) | 14:34.41 | | |

=== Women ===
| Edition | Winner | Time | Notes | Ref. |
|---|---|---|---|---|
| (Japan) Fukuoka 2001 | Hannah Stockbauer (GER) | 16:01.02 | CR | |
| (Spain) Barcelona 2003 | Hannah Stockbauer (GER) | 16:00.18 | CR | |
| (Canada) Montreal 2005 | Kate Ziegler (USA) | 16:00.41 | | |
| (Australia) Melbourne 2007 | Kate Ziegler (USA) | 15:53.05 | CR | |
| (Italy) Rome 2009 | Alessia Filippi (ITA) | 15:44.93 | CR | |
| (China) Shanghai 2011 | Lotte Friis (DEN) | 15:49.59 | | |
| (Spain) Barcelona 2013 | Katie Ledecky (USA) | 15:36.53 | WR | |
| (Russia) Kazan 2015 | Katie Ledecky (USA) | 15:25.48 | WR | |
| (Hungary) Budapest 2017 | Katie Ledecky (USA) | 15:31.82 | | |
| (South Korea) Gwangju 2019 | Simona Quadarella (ITA) | 15:40.89 | | |
| (Hungary) Budapest 2022 | Katie Ledecky (USA) | 15:30.15 | | |
| (Japan) Fukuoka 2023 | Katie Ledecky (USA) | 15:26.27 | | |
| (Qatar) Doha 2024 | Simona Quadarella (ITA) | 15:46.99 | | |
| Singapore 2025 | Katie Ledecky (USA) | 15:26.44 | | |

== World champions (short course) ==
=== Men ===
| Edition | Winner | Time | Notes | Ref. |
|---|---|---|---|---|
| (Spain) Palma de Mallorca 1993 | Daniel Kowalski (AUS) | 14:42.04 | CR | |
| (Brazil) Rio de Janeiro 1995 | Daniel Kowalski (AUS) | 14:48.51 | | |
| (Sweden) Gothenburg 1997 | Grant Hackett (AUS) | 14:39.54 | CR | |
| Hong Kong 1999 | Grant Hackett (AUS) | 14:32.87 | CR | |
| (Greece) Athens 2000 | Jörg Hoffmann (GER) | 14:47.57 | | |
| (Russia) Moscow 2002 | Grant Hackett (AUS) | 14:33.94 | | |
| (United States) Indianapolis 2004 | Yuri Prilukov (RUS) | 14:39.16 | | |
| (China) Shanghai 2006 | Yuri Prilukov (RUS) | 14:23.92 | CR | |
| (United Kingdom) Manchester 2008 | Yuri Prilukov (RUS) | 14:22.98 | CR | |
| (United Arab Emirates) Dubai 2010 | Oussama Mellouli (TUN) | 14:24.16 | | |
| (Turkey) Istanbul 2012 | Mads Glæsner (DEN) | 14:30.01 | | |
| (Qatar) Doha 2014 | Gregorio Paltrinieri (ITA) | 14:16.10 | CR | |
| (Canada) Windsor 2016 | Park Tae-hwan (KOR) | 14:15.51 | CR | |
| (China) Hangzhou 2018 | Mykhailo Romanchuk (UKR) | 14:09.14 | CR | |
| (United Arab Emirates) Abu Dhabi 2021 | Florian Wellbrock (GER) | 14:06.88 | WR | |
| (Australia) Melbourne 2022 | Gregorio Paltrinieri (ITA) | 14:16.88 | | |
| (Hungary) Budapest 2024 | Ahmed Jaouadi (TUN) | 14:16.40 | | |

=== Women ===
| Edition | Winner | Time | Notes | Ref. |
|---|---|---|---|---|
| (Australia) Melbourne 2022 | Lani Pallister (AUS) | 15:21.43 | CR | |
| (Hungary) Budapest 2024 | Isabel Gose (GER) | 15:24.69 | | |
