= 1993 FINA World Swimming Championships (25 m) – Men's 1500 metre freestyle =

The finals and the qualifying heats of the Men's 1500 metres Freestyle event at the 1993 FINA Short Course World Championships were held in Palma de Mallorca, Spain.

== Results ==
RANK	FINAL RESULTS	TIME
	Daniel Kowalski (AUS)	14:42.04
	Jörg Hoffmann (GER)	14:53.09
	Piotr Albinski (POL)	14:53.97
4.	Graeme Smith (GBR)	14:54.45
5.	Igor Majcen (SLO)	14:56.70
6.	Masayuki Fujimoto (JPN)	15:02.37
7.	Viktor Andreyev (RUS)	15:12.13
8.	Pier Maria Siciliano (ITA)	15:14.33
9.	Alexei Stepanov (RUS)	15:15.47
10.	Yevgeni Logvinov (UKR)	15:17.91
11.	Hisham Al-Masri (SYR)	15:18.30
12.	Malcolm Allen (AUS)	15:19.83
13.	Hans Böhme (BRA)	15:21.32
14.	Xuong Guoming (CHN)	15:26.89
15.	Chris-Carol Bremer (GER)	15:27.35
16.	Ryk Neethling (RSA)	15:36.99
17.	Roy Peacock (RSA)	15:41.50
18.	Masafumi Yamamoto (JPN)	15:43.47
19.	Aleksandar Malenko (MKD)	15:57.69

== See also ==
- 1992 Men's Olympic Games 1500m Freestyle
- 1993 Men's European LC Championships 1500m Freestyle
