= Swimming at the 1997 European Aquatics Championships – Men's 1500 metre freestyle =

The final of the Men's 1500 metres Freestyle event at the European LC Championships 1997 was held on Sunday 1997-08-24 in Seville, Spain.

== Finals ==
RANK	FINAL A	TIME
	Emiliano Brembilla (ITA)	14:58.65
	Igor Snitko (UKR)	15:07.85
	Denys Zavhorodnyy (UKR)	15:19.28
4.	Graeme Smith (GBR)	15:22.11
5.	Frederik Hviid (ESP)	15:22.20
6.	Ian Wilson (GBR)	15:23.54
7.	Marco Formentini (ITA)	15:31.71
—	Jörg Hoffmann (GER)	DNS

== See also ==
- 1996 Men's Olympic Games 1500m Freestyle
- 1997 Men's World Championships (SC) 1500m Freestyle
