= Ilsa Konrads =

Australian swimmer

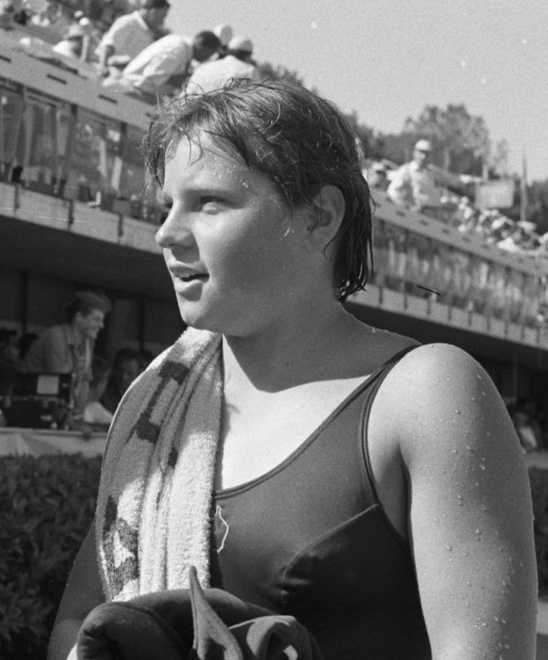
- Konrads at 1960 Olympics

Personal information
- Full name: Ilsa Konrads
- National team: Australia
- Born: Ilze Konrade; 29 March 1944 (age 82) Riga, Latvia
- Height: 1.72 m (5 ft 8 in)
- Weight: 68 kg (150 lb)

Sport
- Sport: Swimming
- Strokes: Freestyle
Medal record
Women's swimming
Representing Australia
Olympic Games
Silver medal – second place	1960 Rome	4×100 m freestyle relay
British Empire and Commonwealth Games
Gold medal – first place	1958 Cardiff	440 yards freestyle
Silver medal – second place	1962 Perth	440 yards freestyle

Ilsa Konrads (Latvian: Ilze Konrade; born 29 March 1944) is an Australian former freestyle swimmer of the 1950s and 1960s, who won a silver medal in the 4×100-metre freestyle relay at the 1960 Summer Olympics. In her career, she set 13 individual world records, and after her swimming career ended, was the Australasian editor of Belle magazine. Along with her brother John Konrads, who also set multiple world records, and won gold in the 1500-metre freestyle, they were known as the Konrad Kids.

== Career ==
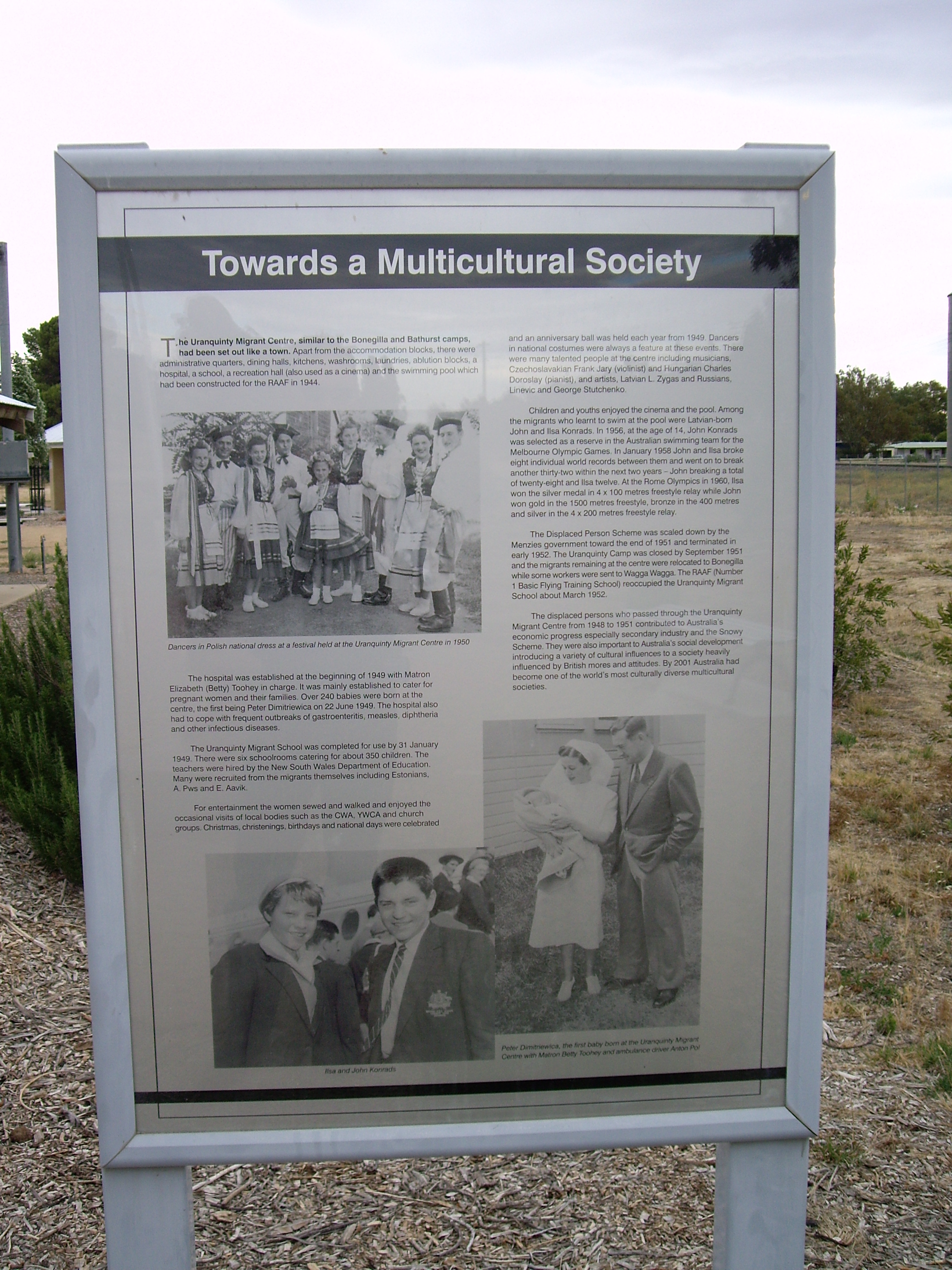
Public Memorial to Uranquinty's link with World War II refugees – Olympic swimmers John Konrads and Ilsa Konrads are in the bottom left corner

Born in Riga, Latvia, Konrads emigrated with her parents Jānis and Elza, grandmother, elder sister Eve, and elder brother John (Jānis) in August 1944, initially to Germany. This came after Latvia's occupation by German troops during the Second World War and then re-occupation by Soviet troops. Living in Germany until 1949, their application to immigrate to the United States was refused on account of the large size of the family. They were relocated to a camp at Uranquinty, which was previously a base for the Royal Australian Air Force, in rural western New South Wales. There her father Jānis taught the children to swim, fearing that they could drown in the many watering holes and dams in the camp.

Jānis secured a job in Sydney as a dentist, and the family settled first in Pennant Hills and then Bankstown. Elza enrolled in the University of Sydney's dentistry program, as her qualification from the University of Riga was not recognised, but withdrew due to the demands of raising three children. Ilsa and her siblings attended Revesby Primary School, where one of the schoolteachers was Don Talbot. Talbot was an assistant to Frank Guthrie at the Bankstown Swimming Pool.

Every day, Ilsa and her elder brother John cycled to the Bankstown pool before sunrise, for a two-hour training session, before returning home for breakfast and then attending school. After school, they would cycle back to the pool and repeat the training regimen. In 1958, the results of Talbot's regime training began to materialize, when at the age of 13, she broke the 800-metre and 880-yard freestyle world records at the New South Wales championships, and then defeated Lorraine Crapp to become the first woman to complete 440-yard under five minutes. She then defeated Crapp and Dawn Fraser at the 1958 British Empire and Commonwealth Games in Cardiff to win the 440-yard freestyle event. In the two years preceding the 1960 Summer Olympics, she set world records in the 440-yard, 400-metre, 1500-metre and 1650-yard events.

At the Olympics, she suffered from nerves and was eliminated in the heats of the 100 m freestyle, and managed fourth in the 400 m freestyle, some 12 seconds slower than her personal best. She collected a silver in the 4 × 100 m freestyle relay, along with Fraser, Crapp and Alva Colquhoun. Her last competition was at the 1962 British Empire and Commonwealth Games in Perth, Western Australia, where she claimed silver in the 440 yd event.

After her retirement from competitive swimming, Konrads went into journalism, and eventually became the editor of Belle, from 1975 to 1979, a leading Australian interior design magazine, and Vogue Living, from 1979 to 1984 and 1992 to 1999. Konrads also worked for the Sydney Morning Herald newspaper, and since 1999 has been running her own business working as a freelance publisher.

== Honours ==
Konrads was inducted into the Sport Australia Hall of Fame in 1987. In 2000, she received an Australian Sports Medal.

== See also ==
- List of members of the International Swimming Hall of Fame
- List of Olympic medalists in swimming (women)
- World record progression 400 metres freestyle
- World record progression 800 metres freestyle
- World record progression 1500 metres freestyle
- World record progression 4 × 100 metres freestyle relay

Records
Preceded by Jans Koster	Women's 1500-metre freestyle world record-holder (long course); 14 January 1960 – 8 September 1960	Succeeded by Jane Cederqvist
