= Frostad =

Frostad is a surname. Notable people with the surname include:

- Emerson Frostad (born 1983), Canadian former baseball catcher
- Knut Frostad (born 1967), Norwegian yachtsman
- Lawrence Frostad (born 1967), American former competition swimmer
- Mark Frostad (born 1949), Canadian thoroughbred horse trainer
- Tormod Frostad (born 2002), Norwegian skier
