= 1993 FINA World Swimming Championships (25 m) – Men's 4 × 200 metre freestyle relay =

The finals and the qualifying heats of the Men's 4 × 200 metres Freestyle Relay event at the 1993 FINA Short Course World Championships were held in Palma de Mallorca, Spain.

== Final ==
Rank	Final	Time
	Sweden; Christer Wallin; Tommy Werner; Lars Frölander; Anders Holmertz	7:05.92
	Germany; Christian Tröger; Christian Keller; Chris-Carol Bremer; Jörg Hoffmann	7:08.63
	Brazil; Gustavo Borges; Teófilo Ferreira; José Carlos Souza; Cassiano Leal	7:09.38
4.	Russia; Roman Shegolev; Yury Mukhin; Viktor Andreyev; Alexei Stepanov	7:13.80
5.	Italy; Emanuele Idini; Pier Maria Siciliano; Bruno Zorzan; Emanuele Merisi	7:18.94

== See also ==
- 1992 Men's Olympic Games 4 × 200 m Freestyle Relay
- 1993 Men's European LC Championships 4 × 200 m Freestyle Relay
