= Alice Frame =

Alice Frame can refer to:

- Alice Matthews Frame, a fictional character from Another World
- Alice Seymour Browne Frame (1878–1941), American Christian missionary
