= Peter Wright (swimmer) =

American swimmer (born 1972)

Personal information
- Full name: Peter Matthew Wright
- National team: United States
- Born: December 3, 1972 (age 53) New Jersey
- Height: 6 ft 2 in (1.88 m)
- Weight: 165 lb (75 kg)

Sport
- Sport: Swimming
- Strokes: Freestyle
- Club: Jersey Wahoos
- College team: University of Virginia
Medal record
Men's swimming
Representing the United States
Summer Universiade
Silver medal – second place	1991 Sheffield	400 m freestyle

Peter Matthew Wright (born December 3, 1972) is an American former competition swimmer who represented the United States at the 1996 Summer Olympics in Atlanta, Georgia. Wright competed in the preliminary heats of the men's 1,500-meter freestyle, and finished twelfth overall with a time of 15:25.43.

Wright has been a resident of Delran Township, New Jersey.
