= Swimming at the 1992 Summer Olympics – Men's 1500 metre freestyle =

Men's 1500 metre freestyle at the Games of the XXV Olympiad
- Venue: Piscines Bernat Picornell
- Date: 30 July 1992 (heats); 31 July 1992 (final)
- Competitors: 30 from 25 nations
- Winning time: 14:43.48 WR

Medalists
| 1st place, gold medalist(s) | | Kieren Perkins | Australia |
| 2nd place, silver medalist(s) | | Glen Housman | Australia |
| 3rd place, bronze medalist(s) | | Jörg Hoffmann | Germany |

The men's 1500 metre freestyle event at the 1992 Summer Olympics took place between 30 and 31 July at the Piscines Bernat Picornell in Barcelona, Spain.

== Records ==
Prior to this competition, the existing world and Olympic records were as follows.

| World record | Kieren Perkins (AUS) | 14:48.40 | Canberra, Australia | 8 April 1992 |
| Olympic record | Vladimir Salnikov (URS) | 14:58.27 | Moscow, Soviet Union | 22 July 1980 |

The following records were established during the competition:

| Date | Round | Name | Nationality | Time | Record |
|---|---|---|---|---|---|
| 31 July | Final | Kieren Perkins | Australia | 14:43.48 | WR |

== Results ==
=== Heats ===
Rule: The eight fastest swimmers advance to final A (Q).

| Rank | Heat | Lane | Name | Nationality | Time | Notes |
|---|---|---|---|---|---|---|
| 1 | 4 | 4 | Kieren Perkins | Australia | 15:02.75 | Q |
| 2 | 2 | 4 | Jörg Hoffmann | Germany | 15:03.95 | Q |
| 3 | 3 | 4 | Glen Housman | Australia | 15:11.36 | Q |
| 4 | 2 | 3 | Stefan Pfeiffer | Germany | 15:13.71 | Q |
| 5 | 4 | 5 | Ian Wilson | Great Britain | 15:15.37 | Q |
| 6 | 4 | 3 | Igor Majcen | Slovenia | 15:16.85 | Q, NR |
| 7 | 2 | 5 | Lawrence Frostad | United States | 15:21.37 | Q |
| 8 | 3 | 3 | Viktor Andreyev | Unified Team | 15:21.43 | Q |
| 9 | 2 | 6 | Piotr Albiński | Poland | 15:23.01 | |
| 10 | 3 | 8 | Mariusz Podkościelny | Poland | 15:25.42 | |
| 11 | 4 | 7 | Sergio Roura | Spain | 15:26.18 | |
| 12 | 3 | 5 | Sean Killion | United States | 15:27.49 | |
| 13 | 2 | 8 | Pier Maria Siciliano | Italy | 15:28.46 | |
| 14 | 4 | 8 | Christophe Marchand | France | 15:30.51 | |
| 15 | 4 | 1 | Christopher Bowie | Canada | 15:34.28 | |
| 16 | 3 | 1 | Masashi Kato | Japan | 15:40.94 | |
| 17 | 2 | 7 | Artur Costa | Portugal | 15:41.26 | |
| 18 | 2 | 1 | Andrés Minelli | Argentina | 15:44.55 | |
| 19 | 3 | 2 | Stephen Akers | Great Britain | 15:46.48 | |
| 20 | 4 | 6 | Jeffrey Ong | Malaysia | 15:51.41 | |
| 21 | 3 | 7 | Zoltán Szilágyi | Hungary | 15:52.80 | |
| 22 | 1 | 1 | Hisham Al-Masri | Syria | 15:54.41 | |
| 23 | 4 | 2 | David McLellan | Canada | 15:58.38 | |
| 24 | 2 | 2 | Jorge Herrera | Puerto Rico | 16:01.69 | |
| 25 | 1 | 5 | Alejandro Bermúdez | Colombia | 16:01.77 | |
| 26 | 1 | 4 | Bang Seung-hoon | South Korea | 16:04.31 | |
| 27 | 1 | 3 | Ratapong Sirisanont | Thailand | 16:08.02 | |
| 28 | 1 | 6 | Benoît Fleurot | Mauritius | 16:43.46 | |
| 29 | 1 | 2 | Helder Torres | Guatemala | 17:06.08 | |
| 30 | 1 | 7 | Hussein Al-Sadiq | Saudi Arabia | 17:15.75 | |

=== Final ===
| Rank | Lane | Name | Nationality | Time | Notes |
|---|---|---|---|---|---|
| 1st place, gold medalist(s) | 4 | Kieren Perkins | Australia | 14:43.48 | WR |
| 2nd place, silver medalist(s) | 3 | Glen Housman | Australia | 14:55.29 | |
| 3rd place, bronze medalist(s) | 5 | Jörg Hoffmann | Germany | 15:02.29 | |
| 4 | 6 | Stefan Pfeiffer | Germany | 15:04.28 | |
| 5 | 2 | Ian Wilson | Great Britain | 15:13.35 | |
| 6 | 7 | Igor Majcen | Slovenia | 15:19.12 | |
| 7 | 1 | Lawrence Frostad | United States | 15:19.41 | |
| 8 | 8 | Viktor Andreev | Unified Team | 15:33.94 | |
