= Swimming at the 1996 Summer Olympics – Men's 1500 metre freestyle =

Men's 1500 metre freestyle at the Games of the XXVI Olympiad
- Venue: Georgia Tech Aquatic Center
- Date: 26 July 1996 (heats & final)
- Competitors: 34 from 26 nations
- Winning time: 14:56.40

Medalists
1st place, gold medalist(s)		Kieren Perkins	Australia
2nd place, silver medalist(s)		Daniel Kowalski	Australia
3rd place, bronze medalist(s)		Graeme Smith	Great Britain

The men's 1500 metre freestyle event at the 1996 Summer Olympics took place on 26 July at the Georgia Tech Aquatic Center in Atlanta, United States.

== Records ==
Prior to this competition, the existing world and Olympic records were as follows.

World record	Kieren Perkins (AUS)	14:41.66	Victoria, Canada	24 August 1994
Olympic record	Kieren Perkins (AUS)	14:43.48	Barcelona, Spain	31 July 1992

== Results ==
=== Heats ===
Rule: The eight fastest swimmers advance to final A (Q).

Rank	Heat	Lane	Name	Nationality	Time	Notes
1	4	4	Daniel Kowalski	Australia	15:12.55	Q
2	3	4	Graeme Smith	Great Britain	15:14.81	Q
3	5	5	Aleksey Akatyev	Russia	15:16.47	Q
4	5	1	Emiliano Brembilla	Italy	15:16.72	Q, NR
5	4	5	Jörg Hoffmann	Germany	15:18.61	Q
6	5	2	Masato Hirano	Japan	15:19.48	Q
7	3	7	Ryk Neethling	South Africa	15:19.98	Q, AF
8	5	4	Kieren Perkins	Australia	15:21.42	Q
9	5	6	Steffen Zesner	Germany	15:21.65	
10	3	3	Paul Palmer	Great Britain	15:22.65	
11	4	7	Luiz Lima	Brazil	15:24.16	
12	4	3	Peter Wright	United States	15:25.43	
13	3	5	Carlton Bruner	United States	15:25.82	
14	4	6	Alexei Butsenin	Russia	15:31.27	
15	3	6	Ihor Snitko	Ukraine	15:31.40	
16	4	8	Torlarp Sethsothorn	Thailand	15:40.04	NR
17	4	1	Yann de Fabrique	France	15:40.49	
18	5	3	Marco Formentini	Italy	15:41.14	
19	2	2	Sergey Mikhnovets	Belarus	15:41.80	NR
20	2	4	Ricardo Monasterio	Venezuela	15:42.39	
21	3	1	Frederik Hviid	Spain	15:42.40	
22	5	7	Hisato Yasui	Japan	15:43.66	
23	2	5	Jacob Carstensen	Denmark	15:43.75	
24	3	2	Denys Zavhorodnyy	Ukraine	15:46.79	
25	3	8	Lee Kyu-chang	South Korea	15:47.92	
26	2	7	Agustín Fiorilli	Argentina	15:51.85	
27	2	3	Scott Cameron	New Zealand	15:56.60	
28	4	2	Igor Majcen	Slovenia	16:10.81	
29	1	4	Ramón Valle	Honduras	16:14.76	
30	2	6	Dimitrios Manganas	Greece	16:15.94	
31	2	1	Pedro Ferreira	Portugal	16:34.55	
32	5	8	Hisham Al-Masri	Syria	16:42.35	
33	1	3	Hamed Rezakhani	Iran	17:22.86	
34	1	5	Rashid Salim Al-Ma'shari	Oman	18:11.59	

=== Final ===
Rank	Lane	Name	Nationality	Time	Notes
1st place, gold medalist(s)	8	Kieren Perkins	Australia	14:56.40	
2nd place, silver medalist(s)	4	Daniel Kowalski	Australia	15:02.43	
3rd place, bronze medalist(s)	5	Graeme Smith	Great Britain	15:02.48	NR
4	6	Emiliano Brembilla	Italy	15:08.58	NR
5	1	Ryk Neethling	South Africa	15:14.63	AF
6	7	Masato Hirano	Japan	15:17.28	NR
7	2	Jörg Hoffmann	Germany	15:18.86	
8	3	Aleksey Akatyev	Russia	15:21.68	
