= John Konrads =

Australian swimmer (1942–2021)

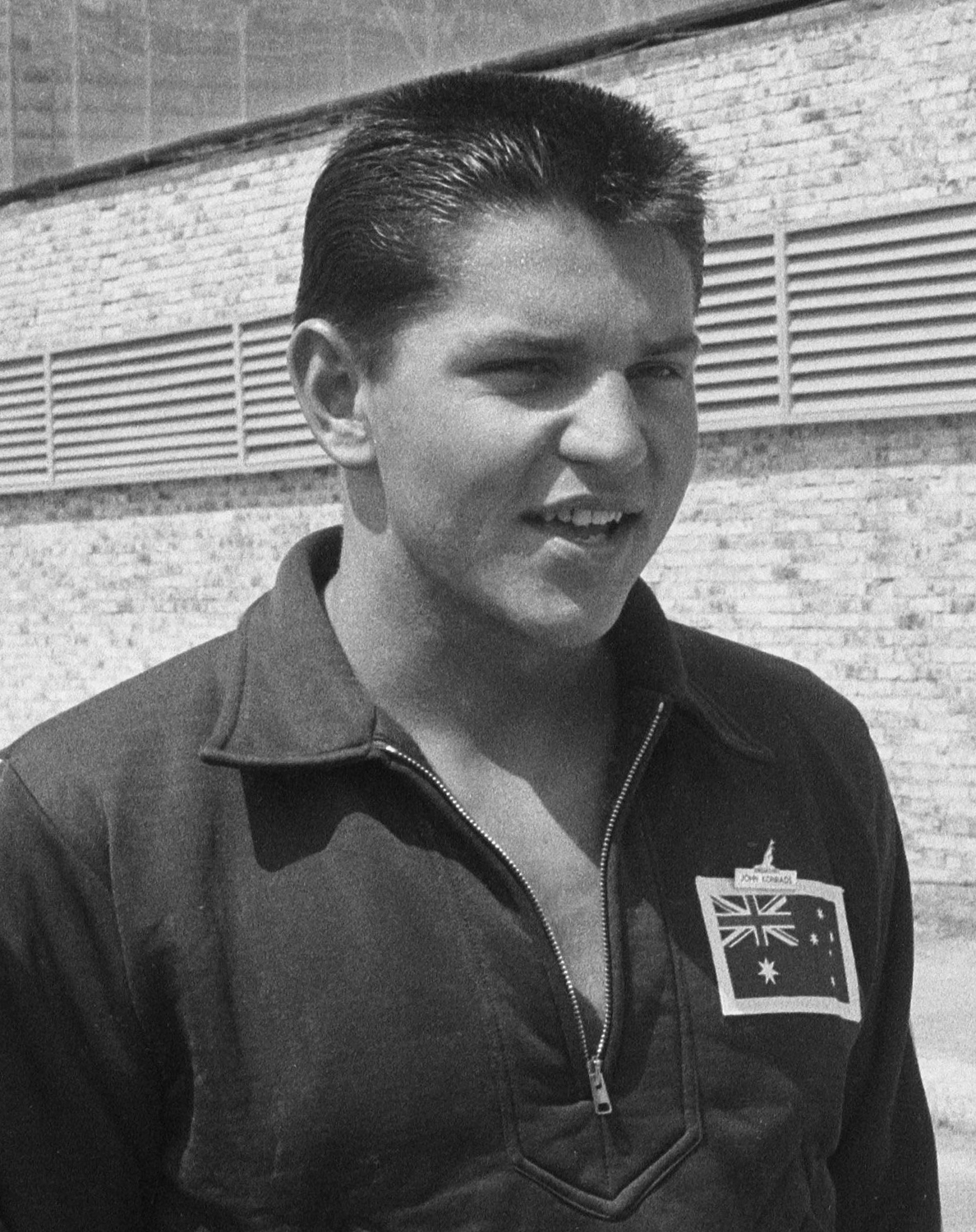

Personal information
- Full name: John Konrads
- National team: Australia
- Born: Jānis Konrads; 21 May 1942 Riga, Ostland (present day Latvia)
- Died: 25 April 2021 (aged 78) Sydney, New South Wales, Australia
- Height: 179 cm (5 ft 10 in)
- Weight: 84 kg (185 lb)

Sport
- Sport: Swimming
- Strokes: Freestyle
Medal record
Men's swimming
Representing Australia
Olympic Games
Gold medal – first place	1960 Rome	1500 m freestyle
Bronze medal – third place	1960 Rome	400 m freestyle
Bronze medal – third place	1960 Rome	4x200 m freestyle relay
British Empire and Commonwealth Games
Gold medal – first place	1958 Cardiff	440 yd freestyle
Gold medal – first place	1958 Cardiff	1650 yd freestyle
Gold medal – first place	1958 Cardiff	4×200 m freestyle relay

John Konrads (Latvian: Jānis Konrads; 21 May 1942 – 25 April 2021) was an Australian freestyle swimmer of the 1950s and 1960s, who won the 1500 m freestyle at the 1960 Summer Olympics in Rome. In his career, he set 26 individual world records, and after his swimming career ended, was the Australasian director of L'Oréal, as well as campaigning for the Sydney Olympics bid. Along with his sister Ilsa, who also set multiple world records, they were known as the Konrads Kids.

== Early life ==
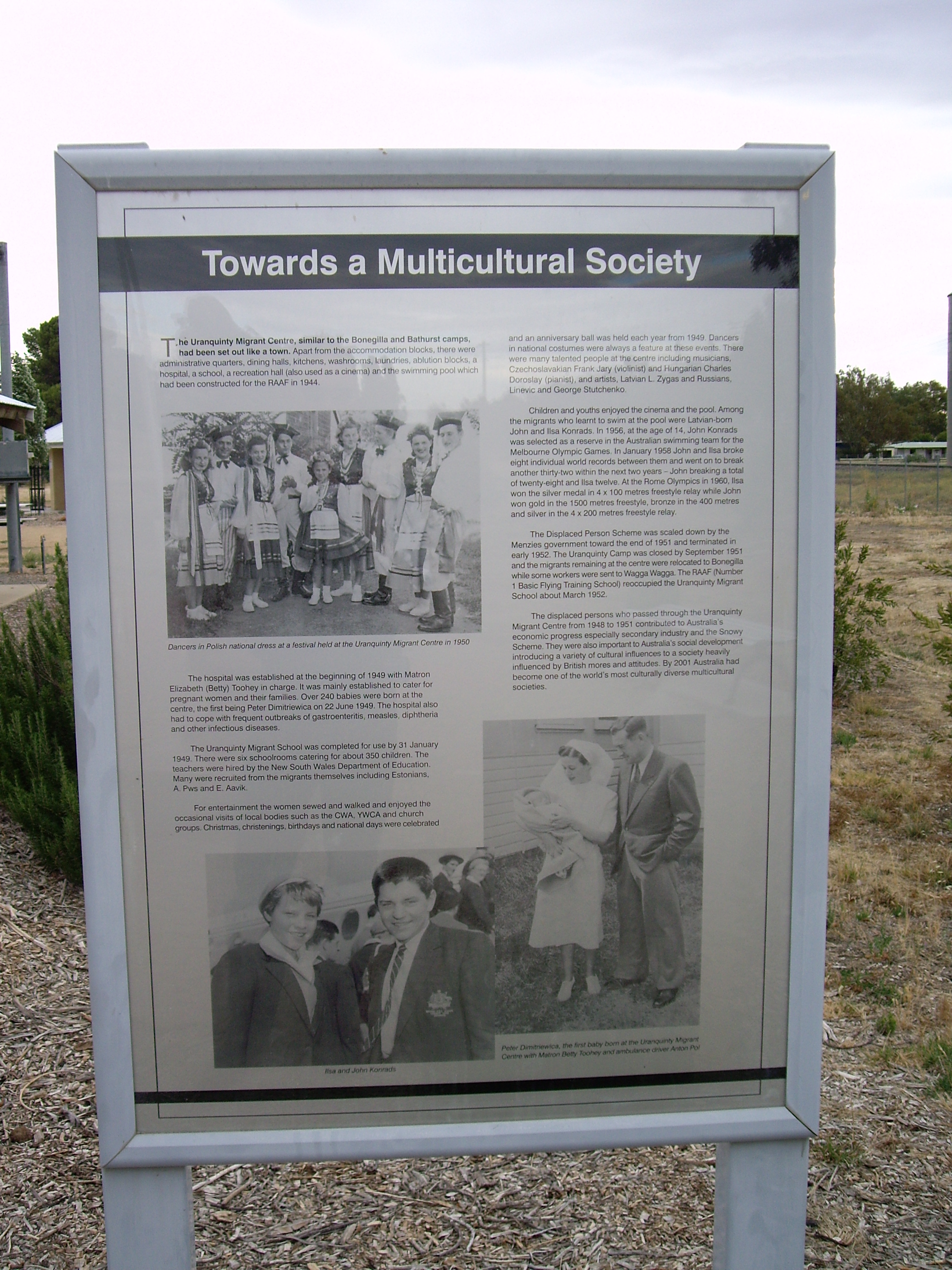
Public memorial to Uranquinty's link with World War II refugees – Olympic swimmers John Konrads and Ilsa Konrads are in the bottom left corner.

Konrads was born Jānis Konrads in Riga, Latvia, on 21 May 1942. He emigrated with his parents Jānis and Elza, grandmother, elder sister Eve and younger sister Ilsa in August 1944, initially staying in Germany. This came after occupation of Latvia by German troops during the Second World War and then reoccupation by Soviet troops. Living in Germany until 1949, their application to immigrate to the United States was refused on account of the large size of the family. Instead, Australia accepted them. They were first located at Greta migrants' camp near Maitland, New South Wales, and then they were relocated to a camp at Uranquinty, in mid-western New South Wales, at what had been a base for the Royal Australian Air Force. There his father Jānis taught the children to swim, fearing that they could drown in the many watering holes and dams in the camp. After spending four weeks in hospital due to a case of polio, Konrads swam therapeutically to rebuild strength.

His father Jānis secured a job in Sydney as a dentist, and the family settled first in Pennant Hills and then Bankstown. Elza enrolled in the University of Sydney's dentistry program, as her qualification from the University of Riga was not recognised, but withdrew due to the demands of raising three children. Konrads and his siblings attended Revesby Primary School, where one of the schoolteachers was Don Talbot. Talbot was an assistant to Frank Guthrie as the Bankstown Swimming Pool coach. Konrads joined the club in the 1953–1954 season, winning the junior 880 yd freestyle. His first national title came in 1956, winning the junior 440 yd freestyle. This led to Konrads being selected for the team to attend the 1956 Summer Olympics in Melbourne, although as a reserve he did not compete in any form.

Every day, John and his younger sister Ilsa cycled to the Bankstown pool before sunrise, for a two-hour training session, before returning home for breakfast and then attending school. After school, they would cycle back to the pool and repeat the training regimen. The results of his training began to materialise in 1958, when he started to win his first national titles and break his first world records. In Sydney in January, in the space of eight days, he broke six world records: 200 m, 220 yd, 400 m, 440 yd, 800 m and 800 yd. He set another eight in February and March, including a 1500 m and 1650 yd world record, and proceeded to win the 220 yd, 440 yd and 1650 yd freestyle at the Australian Championships. At the 1958 Empire Games in Cardiff, he won the 440 yd and 1650 yd and then combined with John Devitt, Gary Chapman and Brian Wilkinson to claim the 4 × 220 yd freestyle. One year later, he broke six world records in the same six events as he did in January the previous year, and was the first person to sweep the freestyle events from 110 yd to 1650 yd at the Australian Championships, winning the Helms Award. He decided in conjunction with Talbot to concentrate on the 400 m and 1500 m events for the Olympics, and in 1960, at the Australian championships, set world records in the 400 m, 440 yd, 1500 m and 1650 yd events. He also won the 220 yd event in world record time, but it was not an Olympic event at the time.

== Rome Olympics ==
At the Olympics in Rome, fellow Australian and defending 400 m and 1500 m champion Murray Rose had returned from the United States to compete, and qualified fastest for the 400 m final, although well outside Konrads' mark. Konrads held the lead in the final until the halfway mark, when Rose attacked and Konrads deviated from his raceplan. Rose went on to win in 4 m 18.3 s while Konrads was third in 4 m 21.8 s, well outside his world record of 4 m 15.9 s. In the 1500 m final, Konrads qualified second as Rose set an Olympic record in the final. Although George Breen of the United States had attacked early, Konrads stuck to his raceplan and overhauled him to win in an Olympic record time of 17 m 19.6 s, with Rose second. In the 4 × 200 m freestyle relay, Konrads combined with Devitt, Rose and David Dickson to claim a bronze medal behind the United States and Japan. In Olympic training at the Tobruk Pool, Townsville, Queensland, the Australians had broken the world record for this event, but without teammate Jon Henricks, who withdrew due to illness, they were not able to keep pace with the Americans who claimed both the gold and the world record.

== Later life ==
After the games, Konrads accepted a swimming scholarship at the University of Southern California, where his performances decreased over time. Upon returning to Australia to qualify for the 1964 Summer Olympics, he managed only qualification for the 4 × 200 m freestyle relay team. He only swam in the heats, and watched from the stands as another Australian, Bob Windle, claimed his 1500 m title. After retirement, Konrads became a swimming coach, and with his marketing degree from USC, he eventually rose to the Australasian directorship of L'Oréal. He later established a consultancy and advertising firm.

Konrads publicly revealed his struggles with bipolar disorder, and sought to raise public awareness with features on Australian television.

In 1984, Konrads had one of his gold medals (1500-metre freestyle – 1960 Rome Olympics) stolen from his Melbourne home. It was found 25 years later after a woman tried to sell it to an American sports enthusiast. The woman purchased the gold medal at a bric-a-brac sale in Brisbane. The returned medal is now on loan for display at the National Sports Museum in Melbourne. In 2011, Konrads decided to auction his collection of swimming memorabilia, including his medals. This was acquired by the National Museum of Australia in August of that year.

Konrads died on 25 April 2021, 26 days short of his 79th birthday.

== Honours ==
Konrads was inducted into the Sport Australia Hall of Fame in 1985. In 2000, he received an Australian Sports Medal.

== See also ==
- List of members of the International Swimming Hall of Fame
- List of Commonwealth Games medallists in swimming (men)
- List of Olympic medalists in swimming (men)
- World record progression 200 metres freestyle
- World record progression 400 metres freestyle
- World record progression 800 metres freestyle
- World record progression 1500 metres freestyle
- World record progression 4 × 100 metres freestyle relay
- World record progression 4 × 200 metres freestyle relay
