= Ramón Valle (swimmer) =

American-Honduran swimmer (born 1976)

Personal information
- Full name: Ramón Valle Gonzales
- Born: August 17, 1976 (age 49) Honduras

Sport
- Sport: Swimming
Medal record
Representing Honduras
Central American and Caribbean Games
Bronze medal – third place	1998 Maracaibo	1500m freestyle

Ramón Valle Gonzales (born August 17, 1976) is an American swimmer. Born in Honduras, he represented the nation in international competition. He competed in various competitions such as the Olympic Games, World Aquatics Championships, and Pan American Games. During his career, he medaled one bronze medal at the Central American and Caribbean Games and ten gold medals at two editions of the Central American Games. At the 1999 Pan American Games, he became the first Honduran athlete to reach the finals of any event at the Pan American Games.

After his career, he was named the Male Olympic Athlete of the 20th Century by the Honduran Olympic Committee. He moved to the United States and worked for Kimberly-Clark, later becoming a citizen. During his time there, he became a masters swimmer.

== Biography ==
Ramón Valle Gonzales was born on 17 August 1976 in Honduras. He suffered from asthma when he was a child and was later enrolled in a swimming program upon his doctor's advice to his father in order to improve his lungs.

Valle was later the highest ranked swimmer in Central America for his event and qualified to represent Honduras at the 1996 Summer Olympics in Atlanta, United States. At the 1996 Summer Games, he was entered in one event, the men's 1500 meter freestyle. He competed in the qualifying heats of the event on July 26 in the first heat against two other swimmers. There, he recorded a time of 16:14.76 and placed first. He did not qualify for the finals as his time was not fast enough to progress further. After the 1996 Summer Games, he competed his college education and graduated with a degree in Industrial Engineering. He also competed at the 1997 Central American Games which was held in San Pedro Sula, Honduras. There, he won six gold medals in swimming.

In 1998, he competed at the 1998 World Aquatics Championships held in Perth, Australia. He did not medal at the World Championship though set new national records in the men's 200 and 400 meter freestyle. He also competed at the 1998 Central American and Caribbean Games held in Maracaibo, Venezuela, and won a bronze medal in the men's 1500 meter freestyle. The following year, he competed at the 1999 Pan American Games held in Winnipeg, Canada. He reached the finals of the men's 1500 meter freestyle and placed eighth, being the first Honduran athlete to qualify for any final at the Pan American Games. He had announced his retirement here but eventually represented the nation again at the 2001 Central American Games in Guatemala City, Guatemala, and won four gold medals. Due to his service in sport, he was honored with postage stamps showcasing his likeness and was named the Male Olympic Athlete of the 20th Century in Honduras by the Honduran Olympic Committee. He was also married and had a son before his wife and him divorced.

After his career, he moved to the United States and started his Masters in Business Administration. He worked at Kimberly-Clark and was later transferred to Roswell, Georgia. Around this time, he became a citizen of the United States. During the COVID-19 pandemic, his asthma worsened. He competed in masters swimming, even earning two 2021 All-American honors.
