= Jans Koster =

Dutch swimmer (born 1938)

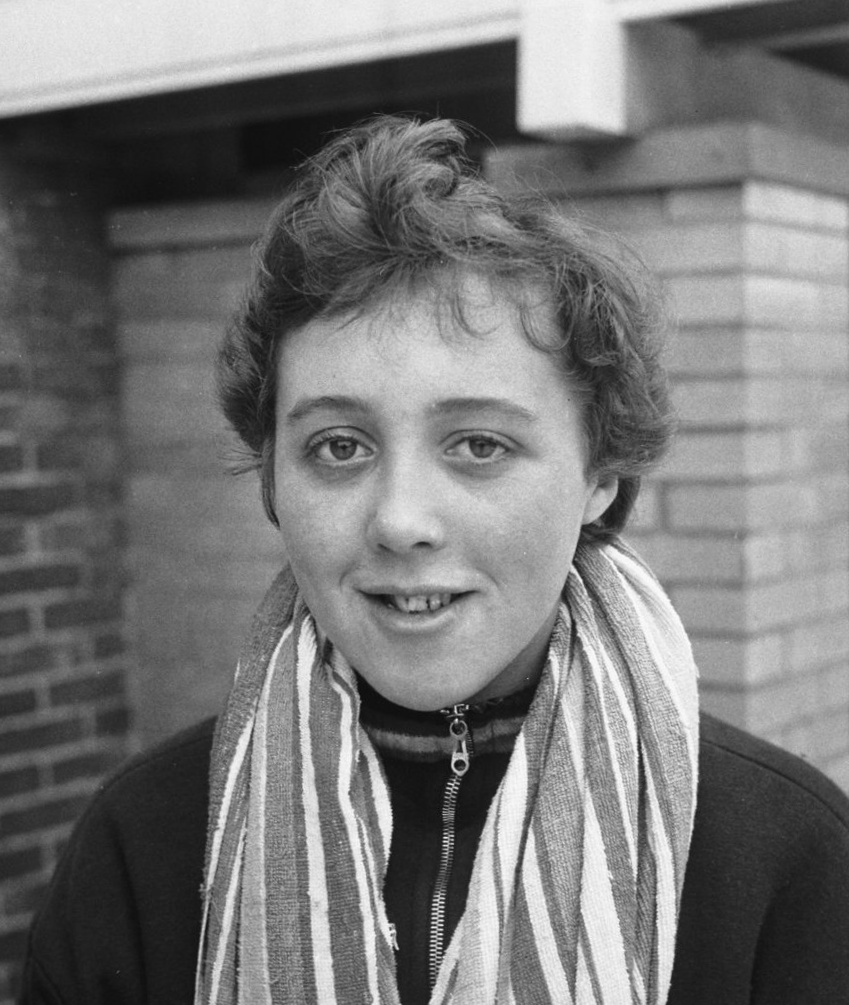
- Jans Koster in 1956

Personal information
- Full name: Jans Koster
- National team: Netherlands
- Born: 1938 (age 87–88) Naarden, Netherlands

Sport
- Sport: Swimming
- Strokes: Freestyle
Medal record
Women's swimming
Representing the Netherlands
European Championships
Gold medal – first place	1958 Budapest	400 m freestyle

Jans Koster (born 1938) is a retired Dutch freestyle swimmer. She won a gold medal at the 1958 European Aquatics Championships (400 m) and set two European and two world records in 1500 m in 1956–1957. On 9 March 1960 she married Ben Hulsegge.

== See also ==
- World record progression 1500 metres freestyle
