= Vladimir Salnikov =

Russian swimmer (born 1960)

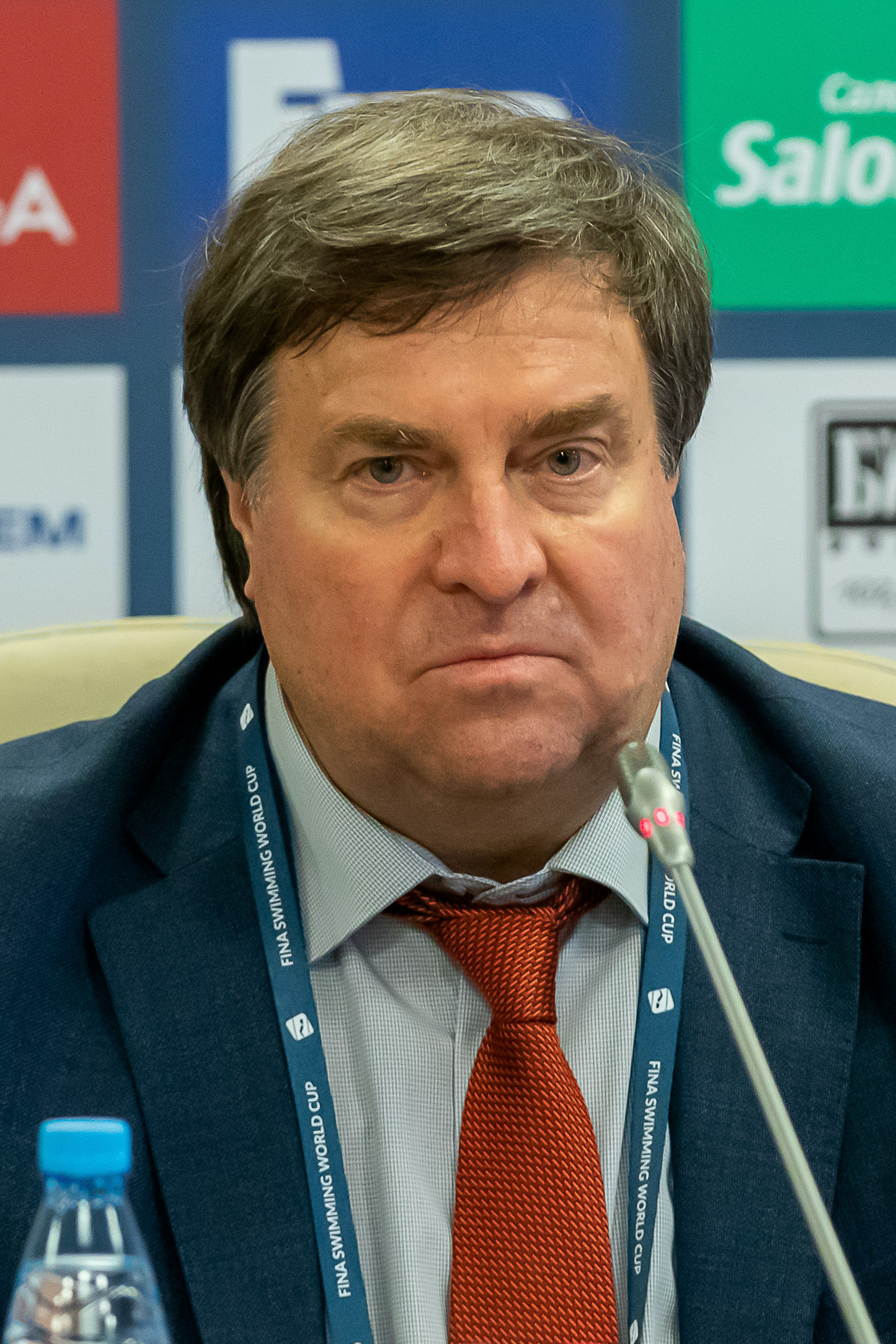
- Salnikov in 2021

Personal information
- Full name: Владимир Валерьевич Сальников
- Nicknames: "Tsar of the Pool", "Monster of the Waves", "Leningrad Express"
- National team: Soviet Union
- Born: 21 May 1960 (age 66) Leningrad, Russian SFSR, Soviet Union
- Height: 1.81 m (5 ft 11 in)
- Weight: 74 kg (163 lb)

Sport
- Sport: Swimming
- Strokes: Freestyle
- Club: Zenit Leningrad/SKA Leningrad
- Coach: Gleb Petrov (1968–1973); Igor Koshkin (1973–1985); Marina Salnikova (1985–1988)
Medal record
Men's swimming
Representing Soviet Union
Olympic Games
Gold medal – first place	1980 Moscow	400 m freestyle
Gold medal – first place	1980 Moscow	1500 m freestyle
Gold medal – first place	1980 Moscow	4×200 m freestyle
Gold medal – first place	1988 Seoul	1500 m freestyle
World Championships (LC)
Gold medal – first place	1978 Berlin	400 m freestyle
Gold medal – first place	1978 Berlin	1500 m freestyle
Gold medal – first place	1982 Guayaquil	400 m freestyle
Gold medal – first place	1982 Guayaquil	1500 m freestyle
Silver medal – second place	1978 Berlin	4×200 m freestyle
Silver medal – second place	1982 Guayaquil	4×200 m freestyle
European Championships (LC)
Gold medal – first place	1977 Jönköping	1500 m freestyle
Gold medal – first place	1981 Split	1500 m freestyle
Gold medal – first place	1981 Split	4×200 m freestyle
Gold medal – first place	1983 Rome	400 m freestyle
Gold medal – first place	1983 Rome	1500 m freestyle
Silver medal – second place	1981 Split	400 m freestyle
Universiade
Gold medal – first place	1983 Edmonton	400 m freestyle
Gold medal – first place	1983 Edmonton	1500 m freestyle
Friendship Games
Gold medal – first place	1984 Moscow	1500 m freestyle

Vladimir Valeryevich Salnikov (Russian: Владимир Валерьевич Сальников; born 21 May 1960) is a Russian former freestyle swimmer who set 12 world records in the 400, 800 and 1,500 metre events. Nicknamed the "Tsar of the Pool", "Monster of the Waves" and "Leningrad Express", he was the first person to swim under fifteen minutes in the 1500 m freestyle and also the first person to swim under eight minutes in the 800 m freestyle. He was named the Male World Swimmer of the Year in 1979 and 1982 by Swimming World.

== Career ==
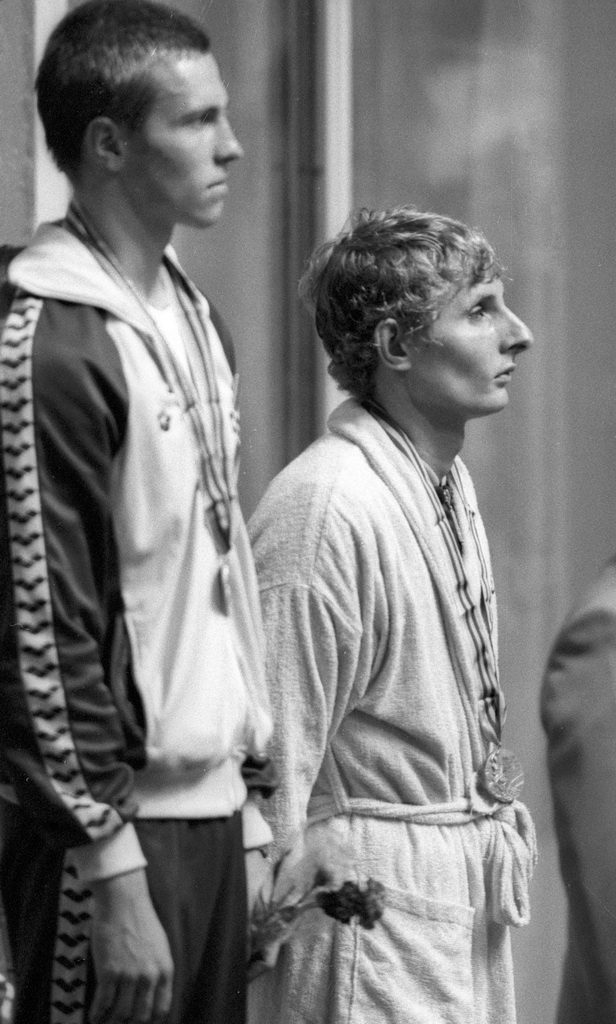
Salnikov (left) on the podium after winning the 1,500 m race at the Moscow Olympics, 1980.

Born in Leningrad, Salnikov was the son of a sea captain. When he was seven years old, his mother took him to a swimming pool to join a swimming team. One year later he began training regularly under the lead of his coach. Salnikov trained at Zenit and later at the Armed Forces sports society.

Salnikov made his debut at the Olympic Games in 1976 in Montreal, at the age of 16. He broke the European record in the 1,500 m, but finished fifth.

His long sequence of international victories began at the 1977 European Championship where he won the gold medal in his favorite distance, the 1,500 m. At the 1978 World Championships in Berlin, Salnikov won gold medals in the 400 and 1,500 m, setting a new world record in the 400 meters. One year later, he set another world record, in the 800 m, becoming the first person to complete the distance in less than eight minutes.

The United States boycotted the 1980 Olympics in Moscow in protest of the Soviet invasion of Afghanistan, but Salnikov demonstrated that he was far superior to everybody, winning the 1500 m race in 14:58.27 and becoming the first person to swim the distance under 15 minutes. He won two more gold medals, in the 4×200 m relay and in the 400 m. In the 1,500 m, his target was not just to win the gold, but to break the world record and the 15-minute barrier. During the race, he managed to control his timing by peeking at the clock by the pool side. Salnikov also planned to break the 400 m world record, but failed, and had to settle for the Olympic record. He did not prepare for the 4×200 m relay, and was enlisted to this event by the team managers.

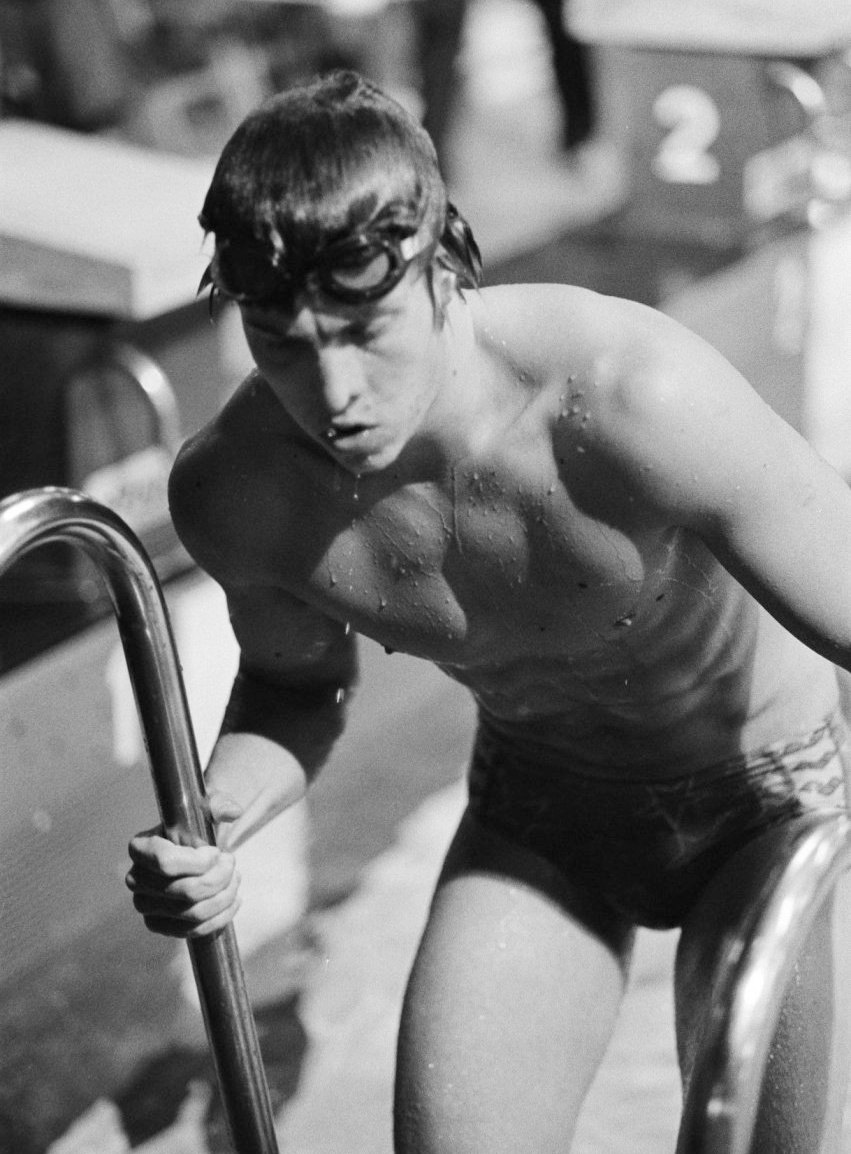
Salnikov in 1981.

In the early 1980s, Salnikov was the absolute ruler of the freestyle races on the longer distances: in 1982, he retained his world titles, and one year later, at the Soviet Winter Nationals, he set a new world record in the 1,500 m with a time of 14:54.76: the record lasted until 1991, when it was beaten by the German Jörg Hoffmann (Salnikov's record had actually been beaten by Glen Housman in Adelaide in December 1989, but due to a malfunction with the electronic timing, his new record time was disallowed).

The Soviet Union boycotted the 1984 Summer Olympics in Los Angeles, so Salnikov could not defend his title. Salnikov went back to Seoul in 1988, aged 28, when he was considered too old. He had set a world record in 1986 in the 800 m, but since then never returned to his former form: he finished fourth in the 1,500 m at the 1986 world championships, and failed to reach the final at the 1987 European championships. His pre-Olympic results did not meet the standards set for the Soviet Olympic team, and he was included in the team only by intervention of Soviet officials. Salnikov did not fail, and won the 1,500 meters race, though he later admitted that in that race he went flat out and swam the last 20–30 metres in a blackout state. That night, when entering the Olympic Village restaurant, he was awarded a standing ovation by the other athletes.

His titles also include four World Championship gold medals, four European Championship gold medals and one European Championship silver medal.

== Coaches ==
Igor Koshkin is credited with bringing Salnikov to the elite level. Later in his career, Salnikov had a brief stay at Mission Viejo in the United States, where he worked with coaches Mark Schubert, Brian Goodell and Tim Shaw. In the mid-1980s, Salnikov parted with Koshkin, who thought that a 25-year-old swimmer had no further prospects. Since 1984–85, he was coached by his wife Marina, a former Soviet track and field record holder in the 100 meters and a sports psychologist.

== After retirement ==
After the 1988 Olympics Salnikov retired from competitions and until 1990 worked as the head coach of the Soviet swimming team. In parallel, between 1989 and 1991 he acted as vice-president of the Soviet Swimming Federation. In 1991–2001, he worked at the company Olimp and represented Speedo in Russia. In 1984–1990 he was a member of the Soviet Olympic Committee and in 1991–2000 a member of the International Swimming Federation’s (FINA) Athletes' Commission. In 2009, he was elected president of the Russian Swimming Federation.

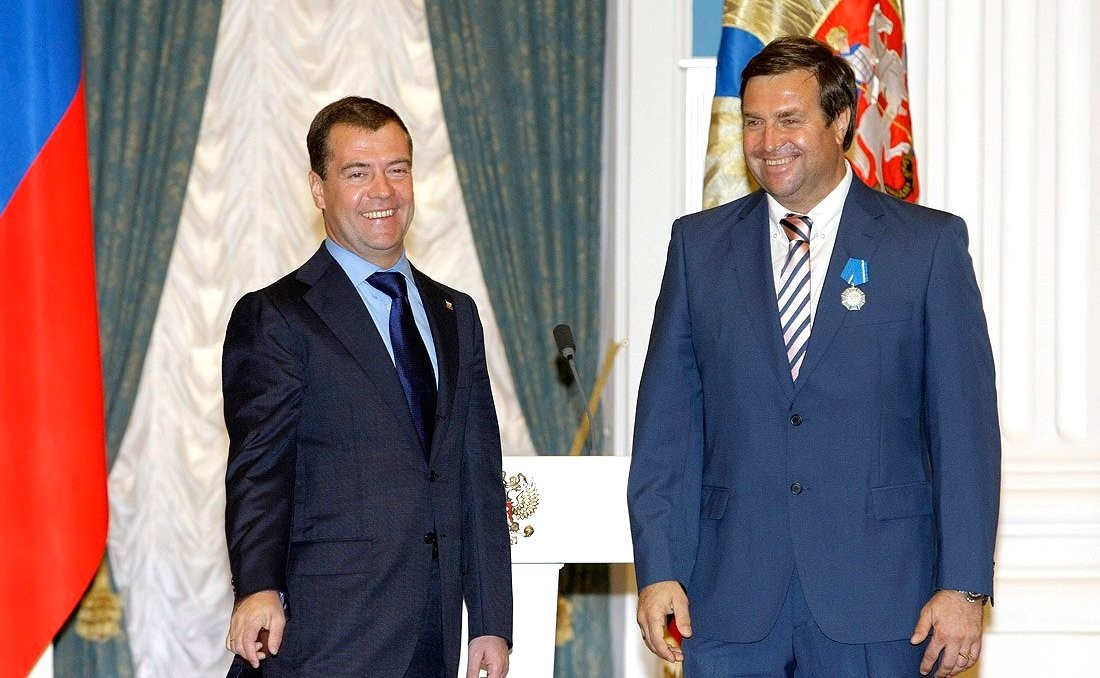
With Dmitry Medvedev on presentation of the Order of Honour, 26 July 2010

Salnikov was awarded the Order of the Red Banner of Labour (1980), Order of Lenin (1985), Order of the October Revolution (1988) and Order of Honour (2010). In 1993, he was inducted to the International Swimming Hall of Fame. He graduated from the Lesgaft Institute of Physical Education in Saint Petersburg and holds a PhD in pedagogy.

Salnikov's 1988 victory in Seoul is mentioned in the Irish 2011 fictional film The Guard. The protagonist, claiming to have finished fourth, says that he aimed for bronze, behind two Germans (Stefan Pfeiffer and Uwe Dassler), but underestimated Salnikov who "was supposed to be over-the-hill" (in real life, fourth place went to Matt Cetlinski).

== See also ==
- List of members of the International Swimming Hall of Fame
- List of multiple Olympic gold medalists at a single Games
- List of multiple Olympic gold medalists
- World record progression 400 metres freestyle
- World record progression 800 metres freestyle
- World record progression 1500 metres freestyle

Records
Preceded by Brian Goodell; Peter Szmidt	Men's 400 metres freestyle world record holder (long course); 6 April 1979 – 15 July 1980; 12 March 1982 – 27 June 1985	Succeeded by Peter Szmidt; Michael Gross
Preceded by Bobby Hackett	Men's 800 metres freestyle world record holder (long course); 23 March 1979 – 25 August 1991	Succeeded by Kieren Perkins
Preceded by Brian Goodell	Men's 1500 metres freestyle world record holder (long course); 22 July 1980 – 13 January 1991	Succeeded by Jörg Hoffmann
Awards
Preceded by Alex Baumann	World Swimmer of the Year; 1982	Succeeded by Rick Carey
Preceded by Incumbent	European Swimmer of the Year; 1980	Succeeded by Sándor Wladár
