= Aleksey Butsenin =

Russian swimmer

Personal information
- Born: 30 March 1976 (age 48)

Sport
- Sport: Swimming

Aleksey Butsenin (born 30 March 1976) is a Russian swimmer. He competed in the men's 1500 metre freestyle event at the 1996 Summer Olympics.
