= Lawrence Frostad =

American swimmer (born 1967)

Personal information
- Full name: Lawrence Keith Frostad
- National team: United States
- Born: January 28, 1967 (age 59) Fremont, California
- Height: 5 ft 10 in (1.78 m)
- Weight: 157 lb (71 kg)

Sport
- Sport: Swimming
- Strokes: Freestyle
- Club: Arden Hills; Sacramento, California
- College team: University of Miami
- Coach: Sherm Chavoor (Arden Hills); Jack Nelson (swimmer) (U. Miami); Mark Schubert (Ongoing training); Eddie Reese (92 Olympics)

Lawrence Keith Frostad, known as "Keith", (born January 28, 1967) is an American former competition swimmer who competed for the University of Miami, and represented the United States in the men's 1,500-meter freestyle at the 1992 Summer Olympics in Barcelona, Spain. In his swimming career, he was a National Champion six times with wins that included the 1500-meter, 800-meter and 400-meter freestyle events. After ending his elite swimming career, he worked in finance.

== Early life ==
Frostad was born January 28, 1967 in Freemont, California, and grew up in Sacramento. He began swimming at age five with the strong Arden Hills Club coached by Hall of Fame inductee Sherm Chavoor. He was an All-American swimmer at Kennedy High School in Sacramento, but was not outstanding as a swimmer for the University of Miami where he earned a degree in Latin American studies, but failed to score at NCAA meets. At Miami, he swam for Jack Nelson, but the team was in a transitional period after Miami's Coach Diaz retired in 1984, and after Coach Hodgson left in 1986, the team was eventually phased out. After his Sophomore year at Miami, with a few months of working with Hall of Fame Coach Mark Schubert at a Boca Raton Club, Frostad qualified for the 1988 Olympic trails in the 400 and 1500-meter freestyle events, and in the finals missed making the U.S. Olympic team by a few seconds. In 1990, Frostad won the Long Course National Championship in Austin, Texas. In 1990, he trained with Schubert in Austin, Texas while Schubert coached at U. Texas Austin.

== 1992 Olympic trials ==
Continuing in the summers and after graduating Miami, under the coaching and intense training of Mark Schubert Frostad continued to improve, and dropped weight. At the 1992 Olympic trials he placed second in the 1500-meter freestyle, qualifying for the team, and was ranked third in the world in the 1500-meter prior to the 1992 Olympics.

== 1992 Barcelona Olympics ==
Frostad competed in the men's 1,500-meter freestyle at the 1992 Barcelona Olympics under Hall of Fame Coach Eddie Reese. He advanced to the event final, in which he finished seventh overall with a time of 15:19.41. Australian Kieren Perkins and German Jorg Housman were pre-game favorites. Perkins of Australia too, the gold with a time of 14:43.48, Perkins' fellow countryman of Glen Housman took the silver with a time of 14:55.29, and Jorg Hoffman of Germany took the bronze with a time of 15:02.29.

In his swimming career, Frostad was a six-time national champion, winning three championships in the 1500-meter freestyle, one in the 800-meter freestyle, and one in the 400-meter freestyle.

Initially intending to retire after the 1992 Olympics, Frostad was the victim of a malicious attack in June, 1995 outside Boston's Fenway Park, and to aid in his recovery took up swimming again. He captured the national title in 1996 in the 800 freestyle, but did not qualify for the 1996 Olympic team.

=== Careers ===
Finding a career in finance, he began with the Mellon Trust Company in Boston, and later worked at Long Beach California's State Street as a derivatives manager. A derivative in finance is an agreement between parties that derives its value from an underlying asset.

== See also ==
- List of University of Miami alumni
