= Sergey Mikhnovets =

Belarusian swimmer

Personal information
- Born: 11 January 1972 (age 53); Meshchura, Russia

Sport
- Sport: Swimming

Sergey Mikhnovets (born 11 January 1972) is a Belarusian swimmer. He competed in the men's 1500 metre freestyle event at the 1996 Summer Olympics.
