= Daniel Kowalski =

Australian swimmer

Daniel Kowalski OAM
Personal information
- Full name: Daniel Steven Kowalski
- National team: Australia
- Born: 2 July 1975 (age 51) Singapore
- Height: 1.80 m (5 ft 11 in)
- Weight: 76 kg (168 lb)

Sport
- Sport: Swimming
- Strokes: Freestyle
Medal record
Men's swimming
Representing Australia
Olympic Games
Gold medal – first place	2000 Sydney	4 × 200 m freestyle
Silver medal – second place	1996 Atlanta	1500 m freestyle
Bronze medal – third place	1996 Atlanta	200 m freestyle
Bronze medal – third place	1996 Atlanta	400 m freestyle
World Championships (LC)
Gold medal – first place	1998 Perth	4 × 200 m freestyle
Silver medal – second place	1994 Rome	1500 m freestyle
Bronze medal – third place	1998 Perth	1500 m freestyle
World Championships (SC)
Gold medal – first place	1993 Palma	400 m freestyle
Gold medal – first place	1993 Palma	1500 m freestyle
Gold medal – first place	1995 Rio	400 m freestyle
Gold medal – first place	1995 Rio	1500 m freestyle
Gold medal – first place	1995 Rio	4 × 200 m freestyle
Bronze medal – third place	1999 Hong Kong	1500 m freestyle
Pan Pacific Championships
Gold medal – first place	1995 Atlanta	4 × 200 m freestyle
Gold medal – first place	1995 Atlanta	400 m freestyle
Gold medal – first place	1995 Atlanta	800 m freestyle
Silver medal – second place	1993 Kobe	400 m freestyle
Silver medal – second place	1993 Kobe	800 m freestyle
Silver medal – second place	1993 Kobe	1500 m freestyle
Silver medal – second place	1995 Atlanta	200 m freestyle
Silver medal – second place	1995 Atlanta	1500 m freestyle
Commonwealth Games
Gold medal – first place	1994 Victoria	4 × 200 m freestyle
Gold medal – first place	1998 Kuala Lumpur	4 × 200 m freestyle
Silver medal – second place	1994 Victoria	1500 m freestyle
Bronze medal – third place	1994 Victoria	400 m freestyle
Bronze medal – third place	1998 Kuala Lumpur	200 m freestyle
Bronze medal – third place	1998 Kuala Lumpur	400 m freestyle

Daniel Steven Kowalski (born 2 July 1975) is an Australian former middle- and long-distance swimmer specialising in freestyle events. He competed in the Olympic Games in 200-, 400- and 1,500-metre individual freestyle events and in the 4 × 200-metre freestyle relay. At the 1996 Summer Olympics, he was the first man in 92 years to earn medals in all of the 200-, 400- and 1500-metre freestyle events. Kowalski, alongside Livinia Nixon, hosted the short-lived TV show Plucka's Place in 1997. Kowalski is perhaps best known for having been a perpetual runner-up to fellow Australians Kieren Perkins and Grant Hackett, who were, respectively, the world's best 1500-metre freestyle competitors during the earlier and later parts of Kowalski's career. He was an Australian Institute of Sport scholarship holder. Daniel's coaches included Denis Cotterell and Bill Nelson.

== Olympic medals ==
- 2000 Summer Olympics: gold medal in the 4 × 200-metre freestyle relay (Kowalski was replaced in the final by Ian Thorpe but as a swimmer in the qualifying heat, he shares the gold medal)
- 1996 Summer Olympics: silver medal in the 1500-metre freestyle, bronze medal in the 400 m freestyle, and bronze medal in the 200-metre freestyle

== World championship results ==
- 1998 World Aquatics Championships: bronze medal in the 1500-metre freestyle
- 1994 World Aquatics Championships: gold medal in the 4 × 200-metre relay, silver medal in the 1500-metre freestyle

== World records ==
Kowalski was part of the world record-setting Australian gold medal 4 × 200-metre relay team at the 1998 Commonwealth Games. Kowalski also holds 400-metre freestyle long-course masters world record in the 30-to-34 age group which he set on 2 May 2009 in a time of 3:58.42.

== Retirement ==
Kowalski announced his retirement from competitive swimming on 8 May 2002. He studied sports marketing at Bond University, graduating in 2003. He was named as an assistant swimming coach at the University of Wisconsin–Madison in 2007, and also won the 2007 Pier to Pub 1.2 km open-water swim held annually in Lorne, Australia.

In February 2004, he was the host of an overnight program on SEN 1116 with former South East Melbourne Magic basketballer Andrew Parkinson. In May 2007, Kowalski appeared as one of the celebrity performers on the celebrity reality singing competition It Takes Two.

In April 2010, Kowalski announced that he is gay. Kowalski says he was inspired to come out by Welsh rugby player Gareth Thomas, who announced the previous December that he was gay. He said "I felt really compelled to do it because it's very tough to live a closeted existence". In 2010, Kowalski was selected by readers of samesame.com.au as one of the 25 most influential gay Australians.

== See also ==
- List of Commonwealth Games medallists in swimming (men)
- List of LGBT Olympians
- List of Olympic medalists in swimming (men)
