= Alice Seymour Browne Frame =

American educator and missionary in China (1878–1941)

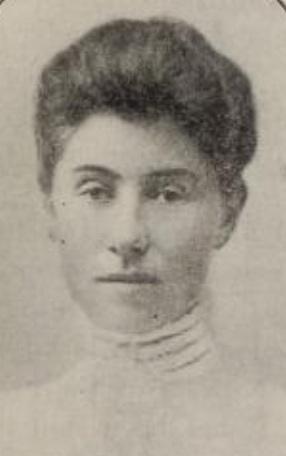
- Alice Seymour Browne, from a 1906 publication
- Born: October 29, 1878; Harpoot, Ottoman Empire
- Died: August 16, 1941 (aged 62); Newton, Massachusetts
- Citizenship: American
- Education: Mount Holyoke College, Hartford Seminary
- Occupations: Christian missionary, educator

Alice Seymour Browne Frame (1878 – 1941) was an American Christian missionary who served as the Dean of Yenching University's Women's College between 1922 and 1931. She also briefly served as the Dean of Residence at Mount Holyoke College in 1928 and 1929.

== Early life and education ==
Frame was born in Harpoot in the Ottoman Empire (present-day Turkey), on October 29, 1878, to American missionary parents, Leila Kendall and Reverend John Kittredge Browne, who worked under the American Board of Commissioners for Foreign Missions.

Frame graduated from Mount Holyoke College in 1900, and earned a degree in religious pedagogy in Hartford Theological Seminary in 1903.

== Career ==
In 1905, Frame moved to Tungzhou, China to work as a missionary and lead a congregationalist school for girls, reportedly having been inspired to move to China by the Boxer Rebellion.

Frame moved to Peking in 1912, where she worked at the North China Union Women's College. She became Dean of the college in 1922, after it became affiliated with Yenching University. Frame went on sabbatical in 1928, after reportedly facing pressure to resign to allow for the appointment of a Chinese Dean, and left the college permanently in 1931. During her sabbatical, Frame served as the Dean of Residence at her alma mater, Mount Holyoke College.

Frame served as secretary of religious education of the Congregational church North China Kung Li Hui and was a delegate of the China Christian council at the Madras Conference of the International Missionary Council in 1938.

== Personal life ==
Frame married Murray Scott Frame, a fellow Christian missionary, in Kyoto, Japan on November 10, 1913. Frame lost two children and became a widow within five years of her marriage; Murray Scott Frame died of typhus in 1918.

Frame died of cancer in Newton, Massachusetts on August 16, 1941.
