= Luiz Lima =

Brazilian swimmer (born 1977)

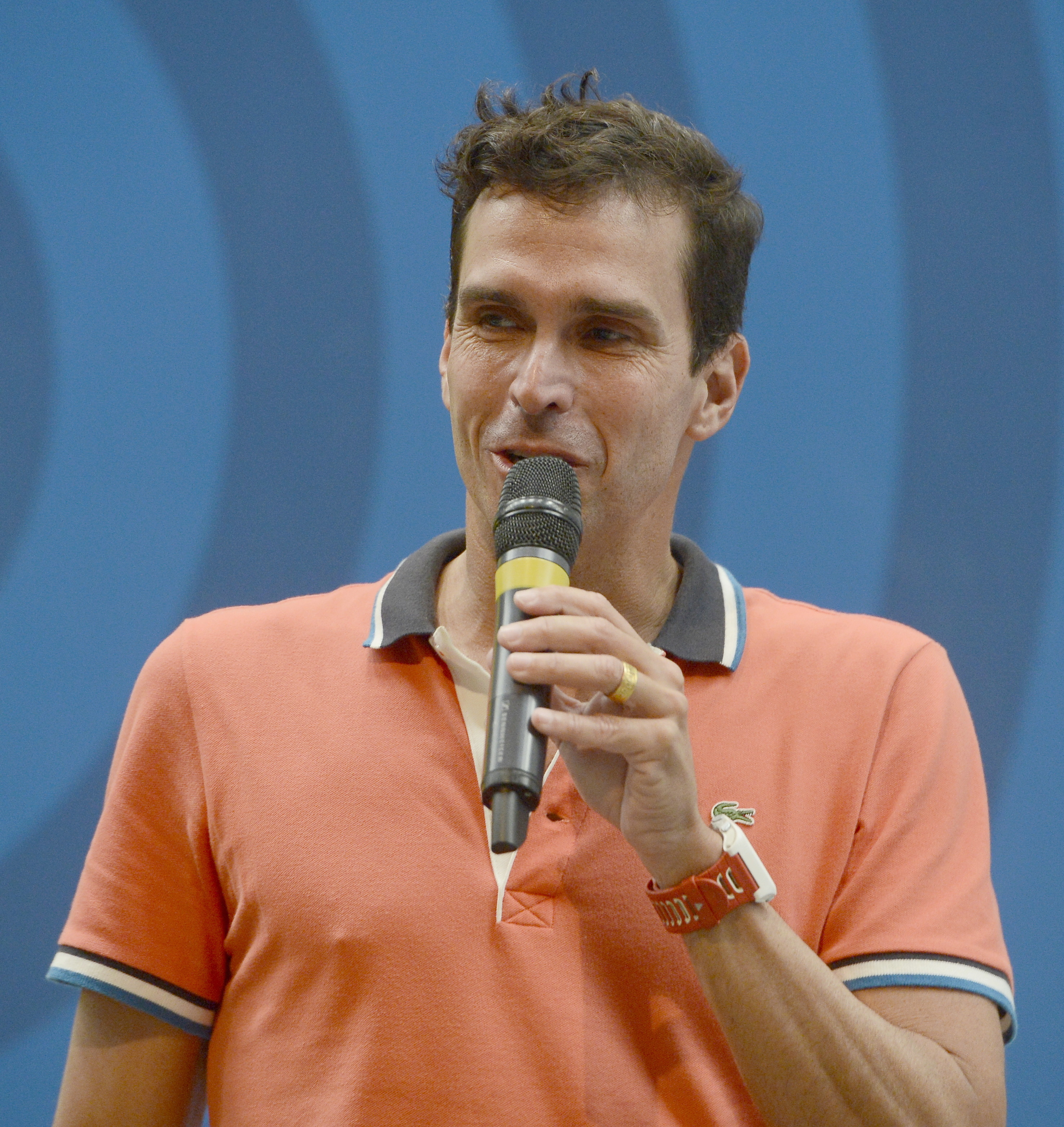
- Lima in 2016

Member of the Chamber of Deputies
- Incumbent
- Assumed office 1 February 2019
- Constituency: Rio de Janeiro

Personal details
- Born: Luiz Eduardo Carneiro da Silva de Souza Lima; 10 December 1977 (age 48) Rio de Janeiro, Brazil
- Party: NOVO (2025–present)
- Other political affiliations: NOVO (2016–2017); PSD (2017); NOVO (2017–2018); PSL (2018–2022); UNIÃO (2022); PL (2022–2025)
- Profession: Swimmer
- Website: www.luizlima.com.br
- Sports career
- Height: 1.84 m (6 ft 0 in)
- Weight: 74 kg (163 lb)
- Sport: Swimming
- Strokes: Freestyle
Medal record
Representing Brazil
Pan American Games
Gold medal – first place	1999 Winnipeg	400 m freestyle
Silver medal – second place	1995 Mar del Plata	400 m freestyle
Silver medal – second place	1995 Mar del Plata	1500 m freestyle
Silver medal – second place	1999 Winnipeg	1500 m freestyle
Summer Universiade
Gold medal – first place	1997 Catania	400 m freestyle
Gold medal – first place	1997 Catania	1500 m freestyle
Silver medal – second place	1995 Fukuoka	800 m freestyle
Silver medal – second place	1995 Fukuoka	1500 m freestyle
Silver medal – second place	1997 Catania	800 m freestyle

Luiz Eduardo Carneiro da Silva de Souza Lima (born 10 December 1977) is a long-distance freestyle swimmer and Federal Deputy of Rio de Janeiro from Brazil, who competed at two consecutive Summer Olympics for his native country, starting in 1996. He won the gold medal in the 400-metre freestyle at the 1999 Pan American Games.

In 1995, Luis Lima surpassed the Djan Madruga's record in the 1500-metre freestyle, 1976. After this, broke the record again. His Brazilian record in the 1500-metre freestyle at Olympic pool lasted 11 years, between 1998 and 2009.

In short course, Lima was the South American record holder in the 1500-metre freestyle with a time of 15:00.32 in 1997, beating the record again in 1998 with 14:57.87, and in 1999 with 14:56.82 and then 14m55s44. He is also the former short-course South American record holder of the 800-metre freestyle, with a time of 7:50.22, obtained in 1998.

At 16 years old, Lima went to the 1994 World Aquatics Championships, in Rome, where he finished 12th in the 1500-metre freestyle, and 21st in the 400-metre freestyle.

Lima participated in the 1995 FINA World Swimming Championships (25 m). He finished 4th in the 1500-metre freestyle, with a time of 15:08.08. He also swam the 400-metre freestyle.

In 1995 Pan American Games, Luiz Lima won the silver medal in the 400-metre and the 1500-metre freestyle.

Lima was at the 1996 Summer Olympics, where he finished 10th in the 4×200-metre freestyle, 11th in the 1500-metre freestyle, and 18th in the 400-metre freestyle.

Lima participated in the 1997 FINA World Swimming Championships (25 m), where he finished 6th in the 1500-metre freestyle and 8th in the 400-metre freestyle.

At the 1998 World Aquatics Championships, in Perth, Lima went to the 1500-metre freestyle final, finishing in 6th place. He also swam the 400-metre freestyle, where he finished 10th.

At the 1999 FINA World Swimming Championships (25 m), in Hong Kong, Lima was a finalist in the 1500-metre freestyle, finishing 6th, and in the 400-metre freestyle, finishing 8th.

In 1999 Pan American Games, Luis Lima won the gold medal in the 400-metre freestyle, and silver in the 1500-metre freestyle. In the 400-metre freestyle, broke the South American record with a time of 3:52.25.

He participated in the 2000 Summer Olympics, where he finished 13th in the 4×200-metre freestyle, 18th in the 1500-metre freestyle, and 17th in 400-metre freestyle.

Luis Lima also participated in 2003 Pan American Games, staying in 4th place in the 1500-metre freestyle.

At the 2003 World Aquatics Championships, Luis Lima finished 23rd in the 1500-metre freestyle and 17th in the 800-metre freestyle.

At the 2007 World Aquatics Championships, participated in the 5 km Marathon Swimming, finishing in 25th position, with a time of 58:30.0.

On 14 December 2008, accepted the challenge to swim 35 km between Rio de Janeiro's beaches of Leme and Pontal, at Recreio dos Bandeirantes (contest inspired by the famous music of Brazilian singer Tim Maia, "From Leme to Pontal"). In which successfully met.

At the 2009 World Aquatics Championships, Lima participated in the 5 km Marathon Swimming where he finished in 19th place with a mark of 57:11.1.

== Personal life ==
Lima is married to Milene Comini and has a daughter, Luiza Lima. He is Roman Catholic.
