= Viktor Andreyev =

Russian swimmer

Personal information
- Born: 24 May 1974 (age 52)

Sport
- Sport: Swimming

Viktor Andreyev (born 24 May 1974) is a Russian swimmer. He competed in the men's 1,500 metre freestyle event at the 1992 Summer Olympics.
