= Piotr Albiński =

Polish swimmer

Personal information
- Born: 7 October 1969 (age 56) Szczecin, Poland

Sport
- Sport: Swimming

Piotr Albiński (born 7 October 1969) is a Polish freestyle swimmer. He competed in two events at the 1992 Summer Olympics.
