= Jörg Hoffmann (swimmer) =

German swimmer

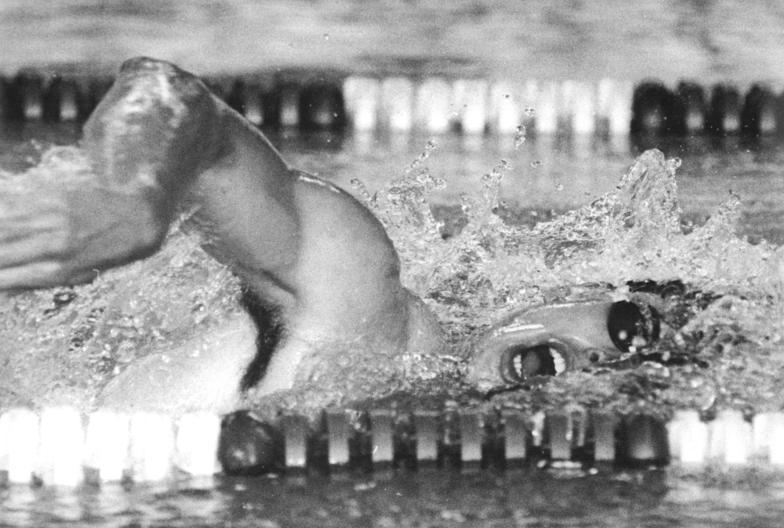
- Hoffmann in 1990

Personal information
- Full name: Jörg Hoffmann
- Nationality: East Germany (until 1990); Germany
- Born: 29 January 1970 (age 56) Schwedt, Bezirk Frankfurt, East Germany
- Height: 1.97 m (6 ft 6 in)
- Weight: 87 kg (192 lb)

Sport
- Sport: Swimming
- Strokes: Freestyle
- Club: OSC Potsdam
Medal record
Men's swimming
Representing East Germany
European Championships (LC)
Gold medal – first place	1989 Bonn	1500 m freestyle
Representing Germany
Olympic Games
Bronze medal – third place	1992 Barcelona	1500 m freestyle
World Championships (LC)
Gold medal – first place	1991 Perth	400 m freestyle
Gold medal – first place	1991 Perth	1500 m freestyle
European Championships (LC)
Gold medal – first place	1991 Athens	1500 m freestyle
Gold medal – first place	1993 Sheffield	1500 m freestyle
Gold medal – first place	1995 Vienna	1500 m freestyle
Silver medal – second place	1993 Sheffield	4×200 m freestyle
Bronze medal – third place	1991 Athens	4×200 m freestyle
World Championships (SC)
Gold medal – first place	2000 Athens	1500 m freestyle
Silver medal – second place	1993 Palma	1500 m freestyle
Silver medal – second place	1993 Palma	4×200 m freestyle
Silver medal – second place	1995 Rio de Janeiro	400 m freestyle
Silver medal – second place	1995 Rio de Janeiro	4×200 m freestyle
Silver medal – second place	1997 Gothenburg	1500 m freestyle
Bronze medal – third place	1995 Rio de Janeiro	1500 m freestyle
European Championships (SC)
Gold medal – first place	2001 Antwerp	1500 m freestyle
Silver medal – second place	1999 Lisbon	400 m freestyle
Silver medal – second place	1999 Lisbon	1500 m freestyle
Silver medal – second place	2001 Antwerp	400 m freestyle

Jörg Hoffmann (born 29 January 1970) is a retired freestyle swimmer from Germany and former World record holder. He was also multiple World and European champion, in both Long and Short Course Championships.

== Career ==
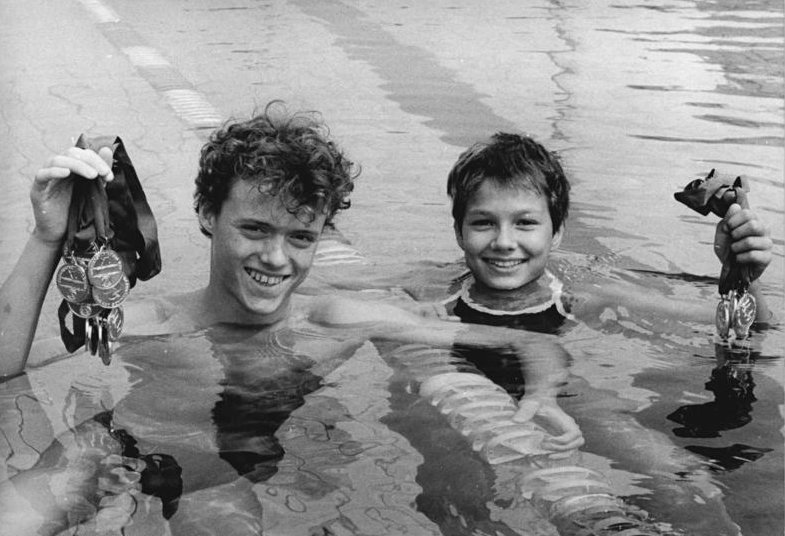
Jörg Hoffmann and Franziska van Almsick (11 years old) at the Children's and Youth Spartakiad, Berlin, East Germany, July 1989

Hoffmann was born in Schwedt an der Oder. He won 2 gold medals at the World Championships, 1 gold medal at the World Championships (SC), 4 gold medals at the European championships and 1 gold medal at the European championships (SC). A long distance specialist, he won the European title in the 1500 m freestyle four consecutive seasons: 1989 in Bonn, 1991 Athens, 1993 Sheffield and 1995 in Vienna.

He won the bronze medal in the 1500 m freestyle at the 1992 Summer Olympics in Barcelona, Spain. He competed in three consecutive Summer Olympics, starting in Seoul 1988 as a member of the East German team.

== See also ==
- List of German records in swimming
- World record progression 1500 metres freestyle

Records
Preceded by Vladimir Salnikov	Men's 1500 metres freestyle world record holder (long course); 13 January 1991 – 5 April 1992	Succeeded by Kieren Perkins
