= Denys Zavhorodnyy =

Ukrainian swimmer (born 1979)

Denys Zavhorodniy
Personal information
- Nationality: Ukraine
- Born: August 5, 1979 (age 46)

Sport
- Sport: Swimming
- Strokes: Freestyle
Medal record
European Championships (LC)
Bronze medal – third place	1997 Seville	1500 m freestyle
Summer Universiade
Bronze medal – third place	1999 Mallorca	400 m freestyle
Bronze medal – third place	1999 Mallorca	800 m freestyle
Military World Games
Bronze medal – third place	1999 Zagreb	1500 m freestyle
European Junior Championships
Gold medal – first place	1996 København	1500 m freestyle
Gold medal – first place	1996 København	400 m freestyle
Gold medal – first place	1997 Glasgow	1500 m freestyle
Gold medal – first place	1997 Glasgow	400 m freestyle
Silver medal – second place	1995 Geneva	1500 m freestyle

Denys Zavhorodniy (Ukrainian: Денис Анатолійович Завгородній, born August 5, 1979) is a retired freestyle swimmer from Ukraine, who was specialized in the long-distance events. He represented his native country at the 1996 Summer Olympics in Atlanta, Georgia.

== Career ==
In 1995, Denys represented Ukraine at the 1995 European Junior Swimming Championships, held in Geneva, where he won a silver medal in the 1500 m freestyle. He also competed at the next European Junior Swimming Championships in 1996 and 1997, where he received in total four gold medals in the 400 m and 1500 m freestyle.

He won the bronze medal in the men's 1500 m freestyle event at the 1997 European Championships in Seville, Spain, behind country man Igor Snitko (silver).

In 1999, Denys competed at the Summer Universiade in Mallorca, where he received two bronze medals in the 400 m and 800 m freestyle. He also won a bronze medal in the 1500 m freestyle at the Military World Games in Zagreb.
