= Swimming at the 1998 World Aquatics Championships – Men's 100 metre freestyle =

Men's 100 metre freestyle at the 1998 FINA World Championships
- Date: 14 January 1998
- Competitors: 83
- Winning time: 48.93 seconds

Medalists
gold medal	Alexander Popov	Russia
silver medal	Michael Klim	Australia
bronze medal	Lars Frölander	Sweden

The finals and the qualifying heats of the men's 100 metre freestyle event at the 1998 World Aquatics Championships were held on Wednesday 14 January 1998 in Perth, Western Australia.

== Results ==
=== Heats ===
Rank	Name	Time	Notes
1	Michael Klim (AUS)	49.33	
2	Alexander Popov (RUS)	49.57	
3	Pieter van den Hoogenband (NED)	49.61	
4	Gustavo Borges (BRA)	49.70	
5	Scott Tucker (USA)	49.86	
6	Lars Frölander (SWE)	49.87	
7	Chris Fydler (AUS)	50.21	
8	Attila Zubor (HUN)	50.29	
9	Neil Walker (USA)	50.35	
10	Marcos Hernández (CUB)	50.37	
11	Ricardo Busquets (PUR)	50.39	
12	Denis Pimankov (RUS)	50.40	
12	Christian Tröger (GER)	50.40	
14	Lorenzo Vismara (ITA)	50.42	
15	Stephen Clarke (CAN)	50.43	
16	Nicholas Shackell (GBR)	50.52	
17	Fernando Scherer (BRA)	50.57	
18	Francisco Sánchez (VEN)	50.64	
19	Bartosz Kizierowski (POL)	50.68	
19	Nicolae Ivan (ROM)	50.68	
21	Yoav Bruck (ISR)	50.74	
22	Salim Iles (ALG)	50.76	
23	José Meolans (ARG)	50.79	
24	Shunsuke Ito (JPN)	50.93	
25	Craig Hutchison (CAN)	51.03	
26	Oleg Rykhlevich (BLR)	51.16	
27	Johan Wallberg (SWE)	51.17	
28	Trent Bray (NZL)	51.22	
29	Brendon Dedekind (RSA)	51.40	
30	Juan Benavides (ESP)	51.42	
31	Julien Sicot (FRA)	51.54	
32	Derya Büyükuncu (TUR)	51.58	
33	Peter Mankoč (SLO)	51.59	
34	Alexander Lüderitz (GER)	51.63	
35	Indrek Sei (EST)	51.64	
36	Mark Stevens (GBR)	51.79	
37	José Rojano (ESP)	51.87	
38	Felipe Delgado (ECU)	51.94	
39	Jacob Rasmussen (DEN)	51.97	

=== Finals ===
==== A ====
Rank	Name	Time	Notes
Gold medal	Alexander Popov (RUS)	48.93	CR
Silver medal	Michael Klim (AUS)	49.20	
Bronze medal	Lars Frölander (SWE)	49.53	
4	Pieter van den Hoogenband (NED)	49.59	
5	Gustavo Borges (BRA)	49.62	
6	Attila Zubor (HUN)	49.82	
7	Chris Fydler (AUS)	49.95	
8	Scott Tucker (USA)	50.36	

==== B ====
Rank	Name	Time	Notes
9	Neil Walker (USA)	49.90	
10	Denis Pimankov (RUS)	50.18	
11	Ricardo Busquets (PUR)	50.19	
12	Stephen Clarke (CAN)	50.38	
13	Marcos Hernández (CUB)	50.41	
13	Nicholas Shackell (GBR)	50.41	
15	Lorenzo Vismara (ITA)	50.66	
16	Christian Tröger (GER)	50.72	

== See also ==
- 1996 Men's Olympic Games 100m Freestyle (Atlanta)
- 1997 Men's World SC Championships 100m Freestyle (Gothenburg)
- 1997 Men's European LC Championships 100m Freestyle (Seville)
- 2000 Men's Olympic Games 100m Freestyle (Sydney)
