= Swimming at the 1998 World Aquatics Championships – Men's 50 metre freestyle =

Men's 50 metre freestyle at the 1998 FINA World Championships
- Date: 17 January 1998
- Competitors: 81 from 61 nations
- Winning time: 22.29 seconds

Medalists
gold medal	Bill Pilczuk	United States
silver medal	Alexander Popov	Russia
bronze medal	Ricardo Busquets	Puerto Rico
bronze medal	Michael Klim	Australia

The finals and the qualifying heats of the men's 50 metre freestyle event at the 1998 World Aquatics Championships were held on Saturday 17 January 1998 in Perth, Western Australia.

== Heats ==
Rank	Heat	Name	Nationality	Time	Notes
1	11	Michael Klim	Australia	22.58	
1	11	Alexander Popov	Russia	22.58	
3	11	Ricardo Busquets	Puerto Rico	22.61	
4	9	Bill Pilczuk	United States	22.70	
5	10	Fernando Scherer	Brazil	22.76	
6	11	Brendon Dedekind	South Africa	22.77	
7	9	Pieter van den Hoogenband	Netherlands	22.79	
8	9	Neil Walker	United States	22.82	
9	11	Mark Foster	Great Britain	22.85	
10	9	Alexander Lüderitz	Germany	22.86	
11	5	Yoav Bruck	Israel	22.90	
12	10	Julien Sicot	France	22.98	
12	11	Denis Pimankov	Russia	22.98	
12	9	Nathan Rickard	Australia	22.98	
15	10	Ricardo Dornelas	Brazil	23.08	
16	8	Bartosz Kizierowski	Poland	23.12	
17	9	Torsten Spanneberg	Germany	23.12	
18	10	Jiang Chengji	China	23.13	
19	10	José Meolans	Argentina	23.15	
20	7	Fredrik Letzler	Sweden	23.18	
21	8	Mike Fibbens	Great Britain	23.29	
22	8	Lorenzo Vismara	Italy	23.31	
22	10	Aleh Rukhlevich	Belarus	23.31	
24	7	Stephen Clarke	Canada	23.37	
25	8	Craig Hutchison	Canada	23.40	
26	10	Juan Benavides	Spain	23.42	
27	11	Nicolae Ivan	Romania	23.47	
28	8	Indrek Sei	Estonia	23.50	
29	8	Francisco Sánchez	Venezuela	23.54	
30	7	Shunsuke Ito	Japan	23.61	
31	7	Felipe Delgado	Ecuador	23.64	
32	11	Stavros Michaelides	Cyprus	23.66	
33	8	Salim Iles	Algeria	23.74	
34	7	Jonas Åkesson	Sweden	23.79	
35	8	Alen Lončar	Croatia	23.83	
35	9	Hans Bylemans	Belgium	23.83	
37	6	Janko Gojkovic	Bosnia and Herzegovina	23.88	
38	7	Nicholas O'Hare	Ireland	23.94	
39	7	Ravil Nachaev	Uzbekistan	24.14	
40	7	Igor Sitnikov	Kazakhstan	24.17	
41	5	Huang Chih Yung	Chinese Taipei	24.29	
41	6	Nick Tonge	New Zealand	24.29	
43	5	Mehdi Addadi	Algeria	24.43	
44	6	Gentil Offoan	Nigeria	24.49	
45	6	John Steel	New Zealand	24.52	
46	6	Leslie Kwok	Singapore	24.67	
47	5	Carl Probert	Fiji	24.73	
48	4	Kenneth Goh	Singapore	24.79	
49	5	Stephen Troake	Bermuda	24.84	
50	6	Jesus Gonzalez Cisneros	Mexico	24.86	
51	5	Hung Chien Chih	Chinese Taipei	24.97	
52	4	Zachary Moffatt	Hong Kong	25.01	
53	6	Alexey Makhantsev	Uzbekistan	25.05	
54	4	Christophe Lim	Mauritius	25.35	
55	5	Kehinde Erewunmi	Nigeria	25.36	
56	4	Behzad Mehdi Khabazian	Iran	25.48	
57	4	Gael Duchenne	Mauritius	25.66	
58	4	Tai Ka Kin	Macau	25.70	
59	3	Bertrand Hubert	Tahiti	25.90	
60	3	Diego Mularoni	San Marino	26.04	
61	3	Sashi Flores	Guam	26.11	
62	3	Hamidreza Mobarrez	Iran	26.12	
63	6	Ghefari Dulapandan	Sri Lanka	26.38	
64	5	Daniel Teriipaia	Tahiti	26.47	
65	3	Matteo Cesarini	San Marino	26.55	
66	3	Woo Kim	Kenya	26.85	
67	3	Felix Valdivia	Nicaragua	26.94	
68	3	Vladimir Klimushin	Turkmenistan	27.15	
69	4	Naranbai Nasanbat	Mongolia	27.16	
70	4	Andrew Lee	Guam	27.35	
71	2	Michael Watson	Guyana	27.64	
72	9	Guillaume Lobe Njoh	Cameroon	27.73	
73	2	John Dagbovi-Senakwami	Togo	28.79	
–	2	Mikel Ohan	Iraq	DQ	
–	2	Mohammed Ssebulime	Uganda	DQ	
–	2	Anlloyd Samuel	Palau	DQ	
–	1	Pedro Bonnelly	Dominican Republic	DNS	
–	1	Orgil Nomingoo	Mongolia	DNS	
–	1	Hassan Mosa	Palestine	DNS	
–	2	Dmitri Margaryan	Armenia	DNS	
–	10	Marcos Hernández	Cuba	DNS	

== B Final ==
Rank	Name	Nationality	Time	Notes
9	Julien Sicot	France	22.62	
10	Denis Pimankov	Russia	22.67	
11	Bartosz Kizierowski	Poland	22.77	
12	Nathan Rickard	Australia	22.82	
12	Mark Foster	Great Britain	22.82	
14	Alexander Lüderitz	Germany	23.01	
15	Yoav Bruck	Israel	23.03	
16	Ricardo Dornelas	Brazil	23.07	

== A Final ==
Rank	Name	Nationality	Time	Notes
1st place, gold medalist(s)	Bill Pilczuk	United States	22.29	
2nd place, silver medalist(s)	Alexander Popov	Russia	22.43	
3rd place, bronze medalist(s)	Ricardo Busquets	Puerto Rico	22.47	
3rd place, bronze medalist(s)	Michael Klim	Australia	22.47	OC
5	Neil Walker	United States	22.50	
6	Brendon Dedekind	South Africa	22.54	
7	Pieter van den Hoogenband	Netherlands	22.83	
8	Fernando Scherer	Brazil	22.84	

== See also ==
- Swimming at the 1996 Summer Olympics – Men's 50 metre freestyle (Atlanta)
- 1997 FINA Short Course World Championships – Men's 50m Freestyle (Gothenburg)
- Swimming at the 1997 European Aquatics Championships – Men's 50 metre freestyle (Seville)
- Swimming at the 2000 Summer Olympics – Men's 50 metre freestyle (Sydney)
