= Swimming at the 1997 European Aquatics Championships – Men's 50 metre freestyle =

The final of the men's 50 metre freestyle event at the European LC Championships 1997 was held on Saturday 23 August 1997 in Seville, Spain.

== Finals ==
RANK	FINAL A	TIME
	Alexander Popov (RUS)	22.30
	Mark Foster (GBR)	22.53
	Julien Sicot (FRA)	22.78
4.	Alexander Lüderitz (GER)	22.79
5.	Denis Pimankov (RUS)	22.80
6.	Torsten Spanneberg (GER)	22.88
7.	Yoav Bruck (ISR)	23.03
—	Pieter van den Hoogenband (NED)	DSQ

RANK	FINAL B	TIME
9.	Nicolae Ivan (ROM)	23.02
10.	Oleg Rykhlevich (BLR)	23.07
11.	René Gusperti (ITA)	23.18
12.	Juan Benavides (ESP)	23.20
13.	Indrek Sei (EST)	23.21
14.	Bartosz Kizierowski (POL)	23.35
15.	Dmitry Kalinovsky (BLR)	23.39
16.	Alen Lončar (CRO)	23.52

== Qualifying heats ==
RANK	HEATS RANKING	TIME
1.	Alexander Popov (RUS)	22.57
2.	Julien Sicot (FRA)	22.76
3.	Denis Pimankov (RUS)	22.89
4.	Yoav Bruck (ISR)	22.90
4.	Torsten Spanneberg (GER)	22.90
6.	Mark Foster (GBR)	22.93
7.	Pieter van den Hoogenband (NED)	23.05
8.	Alexander Lüderitz (GER)	23.06
9.	Bartosz Kizierowski (POL)	23.17
10.	Juan Benavides (ESP)	23.19
10.	Oleg Rykhlevich (BLR)	23.19
12.	Indrek Sei (EST)	23.22
12.	René Gusperti (ITA)	23.22
14.	Alen Lončar (CRO)	23.26
15.	Nicolae Ivan (ROM)	23.27
16.	Dmitry Kalinovsky (BLR)	23.29
17.	Christoph Bühler (SUI)	23.35
18.	Hans Bijlemans (BEL)	23.40
19.	Mark Veens (NED)	23.53
20.	Oren Azrad (ISR)	23.61
21.	Nicholas O'Hare (IRL)	23.64
22.	Alex Miescher-Jost (SUI)	23.69
23.	Attila Zubor (HUN)	23.78
24.	Nebojsa Bikic (YUG)	23.80
25.	Ivo Benda (CZE)	23.83
26.	Nicholas Shackell (GBR)	23.85
