= Swimming at the 1997 European Aquatics Championships – Men's 100 metre freestyle =

The final of the Men's 100 metres Freestyle event at the European LC Championships 1997 was held on Thursday 21 August 1997 in Seville, Spain.

== Finals ==
RANK	FINAL A	TIME
	Alexander Popov (RUS)	49.09
	Lars Frölander (SWE)	49.51
	Oleg Rykhlevich (BLR)	49.84
4.	Lorenzo Vismara (ITA)	49.93
5.	Pieter van den Hoogenband (NED)	50.09
6.	Yoav Bruck (ISR)	50.14
7.	Nicholas Schackell (GBR)	50.55
8.	Nicolae Ivan (ROM)	50.93

RANK	FINAL B	TIME
9.	Attila Zubor (HUN)	50.79
10.	Torsten Spanneberg (GER)	50.92
11.	Juan Benavides (ESP)	51.04
12.	Bartosz Kizierowski (POL)	51.13
13.	Julien Sicot (FRA)	51.22
14.	Hans Bijlemans (BEL)	51.26
15.	Lars Conrad (GER)	51.30
16.	Andrew Clayton (GBR)	51.65

== Qualifying heats ==
RANK	HEATS RANKING	TIME
1.	Lars Frölander (SWE)	49.67
2.	Alexander Popov (RUS)	49.87
3.	Lorenzo Vismara (ITA)	50.07
4.	Nicolae Ivan (ROM)	50.21
5.	Pieter van den Hoogenband (NED)	50.28
5.	Oleg Rykhlevich (BLR)	50.28
7.	Nicholas Schackell (GBR)	50.39
8.	Yoav Bruck (ISR)	50.64
9.	Vladimir Pyshnenko (RUS)	50.77
10.	Torsten Spanneberg (GER)	50.80
11.	Juan Benavides (ESP)	50.86
12.	Attila Zubor (HUN)	51.13
13.	Lars Conrad (GER)	50.88
14.	Bartosz Kizierowski (POL)	51.12
15.	Hans Bijlemans (BEL)	51.46
16.	Julien Sicot (FRA)	51.49
17.	Andrew Clayton (GBR)	51.59
18.	Indrek Sei (EST)	51.59
19.	Mark Veens (NED)	51.61
19.	Igor Koleda (BLR)	51.61
21.	Oren Azrad (ISR)	51.78
22.	Jonas Åkesson (SWE)	51.90
23.	Ivo Benda (CZE)	51.99
24.	José Rojano (ESP)	52.03
25.	Christoph Bühler (SUI)	52.09
25.	Alex Miescher-Jost (SUI)	52.09
27.	Nicholas O'Hare (IRL)	52.11
28.	Adrian Andermatt (SUI)	52.23
29.	Vermund Vetnes (NOR)	52.30
30.	Jacob Rasmussen (DEN)	52.33
31.	Jeppe Nielsen (DEN)	52.68
32.	Getin Oguz (TUR)	53.66

== See also ==
- 1996 Men's Olympic Games 100m Freestyle
- 1997 Men's World Championships (SC) 100m Freestyle
