= 1997 FINA Short Course World Championships – Men's 50m freestyle =

The finals and the qualifying heats of the men's 50 metres freestyle event at the 1997 FINA Short Course World Championships were held on the last day of the competition, on Sunday 20 April 1997 in Gothenburg, Sweden.

== Finals ==
RANK	FINAL A	TIME
	Francisco Sánchez (VEN)	21.80
	Mark Foster (GBR)	22.03
	Ricardo Busquets (PUR)	22.17
4.	José Meolans (ARG)	22.22
5.	Scott Logan (AUS)	22.38
6.	Yoav Bruck (ISR)	22.39
6.	Gustavo Borges (BRA)	22.39
8.	Alexander Lüderitz (GER)	22.43

RANK	FINAL B	TIME
9.	Sion Brinn (JAM)	22.35
10.	Bill Pilczuk (USA)	22.36
11.	Indrek Sei (EST)	22.38
12.	Jeffrey English (AUS)	22.47
13.	Felipe Delgado (ECU)	22.52
14.	René Gusperti (ITA)	22.58
14.	Dimitri Kalinovski (BLR)	22.58
16.	Yuriy Vlasov (UKR)	22.75

== Qualifying heats ==
RANK	HEATS RANKING	TIME
1.	Mark Foster (GBR)	21.95
2.	Francisco Sánchez (VEN)	22.01
3.	José Meolans (ARG)	22.25
4.	Ricardo Busquets (PUR)	22.29
5.	Scott Logan (AUS)	22.31
6.	Yoav Bruck (ISR)	22.32
6.	Alexander Lüderitz (GER)	22.32
6.	Gustavo Borges (BRA)	22.32
9.	Jeffrey English (AUS)	22.36
10.	Bill Pilczuk (USA)	22.38
11.	Indrek Sei (EST)	22.44
11.	Felipe Delgado (ECU)	22.44
13.	Sion Brinn (JAM)	22.48
14.	Yuriy Vlasov (UKR)	22.50
15.	René Gusperti (ITA)	22.57
16.	Dimitri Kalinovski (BLR)	22.60
17.	Oleg Rykhlevich (BLR)	22.67
18.	Marcos Hernández (CUB)	22.69
18.	Dan Lindström (SWE)	22.69
20.	Garret Pulle (CAN)	22.70
20.	Fernando Scherer (BRA)	22.70
22.	Brian Retterer (USA)	22.92
22.	Yannick Lupien (CAN)	22.92
22.	Nicolae Ivan (ROM)	22.92
25.	Christian Tröger (GER)	22.94
26.	Roman Yegorov (RUS)	22.98
27.	Ravil Nachaev (UZB)	23.05
28.	Oswaldo Quevedo (VEN)	23.06
29.	Jonas Åkesson (SWE)	23.08
30.	Denis Pimankov (RUS)	23.09
31.	Stavros Michaelides (CYP)	23.13
31.	Simon Handley (GBR)	23.13
33.	Alex Miescher-Jost (SUI)	23.16
34.	Nicholas Folker (RSA)	23.18
35.	Anders Dahl (NOR)	23.20
35.	Vermund Vetnes (NOR)	23.20
37.	Nicholas Tongue (NZL)	23.27
38.	Daniel Schmollinger (AUT)	23.42
39.	Trent Bray (NZL)	23.48
40.	Tanet Aroonsrisopon (THA)	23.55
41.	Andrew Turner (RSA)	23.57
42.	Jacob Rasmussen (DEN)	23.69
43.	Vitali Vasilen (KGZ)	23.75
44.	Alexei Mankhantsev (UZB)	23.94
