= Swimming at the 1996 Summer Olympics – Men's 100 metre freestyle =

Men's 100 metre freestyle at the Games of the XXVI Olympiad
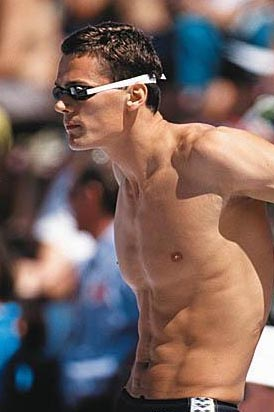
- Alexander Popov
- Venue: Georgia Tech Aquatic Center
- Date: 22 July 1996 (heats & finals)
- Competitors: 61 from 45 nations
- Winning time: 48.74

Medalists
1st place, gold medalist(s)		Alexander Popov; Russia
2nd place, silver medalist(s)		Gary Hall, Jr. United States
3rd place, bronze medalist(s)		Gustavo Borges; Brazil

The men's 100 metre freestyle event at the 1996 Summer Olympics took place on 22 July at the Georgia Tech Aquatic Center in Atlanta, United States. There were 60 competitors from 54 nations. Nations had been limited to two swimmers each since the 1984 Games. The event was won by Alexander Popov of Russia, the third man to successfully defend an Olympic title in the 100 metre freestyle (after Duke Kahanamoku in 1912 and 1920 and Johnny Weissmuller in 1924 and 1928). Gary Hall, Jr. returned the United States to the podium in the event after a one-Games absence. Gustavo Borges, the silver medalist in 1992, earned bronze. Popov and Borges were the 9th and 10th men to earn multiple medals in the event.

== Background ==
This was the 22nd appearance of the men's 100 metre freestyle. The event has been held at every Summer Olympics except 1900 (when the shortest freestyle was the 200 metres), though the 1904 version was measured in yards rather than metres.

Four of the eight finalists from the 1992 Games returned: gold medalist Alexander Popov of the Unified Team (now competing for Russia), silver medalist Gustavo Borges of Brazil, fourth-place finisher Jon Olsen of the United States, and seventh-place finisher Christian Tröger of Germany.

In 1992, Popov defeated defending gold medalist Matt Biondi and proceeded to win every major 50 metre and 100 metre freestyle championship since Barcelona, including the 1994 world championships. Popov was the odds-on favorite. His biggest challenger was American Gary Hall, Jr., runner-up in the world championships.

Belarus, Bosnia and Herzegovina, Croatia, Kazakhstan, Kyrgyzstan, Moldova, Ukraine, and Uzbekistan each made their debut in the event. The United States made its 21st appearance, most of any nation, having missed only the boycotted 1980 Games.

== Competition format ==
This freestyle swimming competition used the A/B final format instituted in 1984. The competition consisted of two rounds: heats and finals. The swimmers with the best 8 times in the semifinals advanced to the A final, competing for medals through 8th place. The swimmers with the next 8 times in the semifinals competed in the B final for 9th through 16th place. Swim-offs were used as necessary to determine advancement.

== Records ==
Prior to this competition, the existing world and Olympic records were as follows.

World record	Alexandr Popov (RUS)	48.21	Monte Carlo, Monaco	18 June 1994
Olympic record	Matt Biondi (USA)	48.63	Seoul, South Korea	22 September 1988

== Schedule ==
All times are Eastern Daylight Time (UTC-4)

Date	Time	Round
Monday, 22 July 1996		Heats; Finals

== Results ==
=== Heats ===
Rule: The eight fastest swimmers advance to final A, while the next eight to final B.

Rank	Heat	Lane	Swimmer	Nation	Time	Notes
1	8	4	Alexander Popov	Russia	48.74	QA
2	6	4	Gary Hall, Jr.	United States	48.90	QA
3	8	3	Gustavo Borges	Brazil	49.17	QA
4	6	3	Francisco Sánchez	Venezuela	49.59	QA
5	5	8	Ricardo Busquets	Puerto Rico	49.61	QA, NR
6	6	5	Pavlo Khnykin	Ukraine	49.69	QA
7	6	2	Pieter van den Hoogenband	Netherlands	49.73	QA
8	8	5	Fernando Scherer	Brazil	49.79	QA
9	8	6	Lars Frölander	Sweden	49.91	QB, WD
10	6	7	Christian Tröger	Germany	50.06	QB
11	7	1	Stephen Clarke	Canada	50.14	QB
12	7	4	Jon Olsen	United States	50.17	QB
13	5	1	Bartosz Kizierowski	Poland	50.18	QB, NR
14	7	5	Chris Fydler	Australia	50.27	QB
14	2	1	Raimundas Mažuolis	Lithuania	50.27	QB, WD
16	8	2	Rostyslav Svanidze	Ukraine	50.31	QB
17	4	4	Sion Brinn	Jamaica	50.38	QB, NR
17	7	6	Björn Zikarsky	Germany	50.38	QB
19	5	5	Aleh Rukhlevich	Belarus	50.42	
20	6	6	Attila Zubor	Hungary	50.43	
21	5	4	Aleksey Yegorov	Kazakhstan	50.49	
22	7	8	Yoav Bruck	Israel	50.61	
23	5	3	Nicolas Gruson	France	50.71	
24	8	1	Vladimir Predkin	Russia	50.75	
25	8	8	Salim Iles	Algeria	50.87	
26	5	2	Brendon Dedekind	South Africa	50.95	
27	5	6	Earl McCarthy	Ireland	50.99	
28	8	7	Nicholas Shackell	Great Britain	51.03	
29	3	1	Sergey Ashihmin	Kyrgyzstan	51.07	NR
30	7	2	Nicolae Ivan	Romania	51.14	
31	6	1	Trent Bray	New Zealand	51.18	
32	4	1	Indrek Sei	Estonia	51.19	NR
33	4	7	Juan Benavides	Spain	51.20	
34	6	8	Richard Sam Bera	Indonesia	51.25	
35	7	7	Béla Szabados	Hungary	51.26	
36	2	3	Janko Gojković	Bosnia and Herzegovina	51.28	NR
37	5	7	Shunsuke Ito	Japan	51.29	
38	4	5	Felipe Delgado	Ecuador	51.38	
39	4	3	Zhao Lifeng	China	51.70	
40	4	6	Marijan Kanjer	Croatia	51.76	
41	3	6	Giovanni Linscheer	Suriname	51.82	
42	3	8	Arthur Li Kai Yien	Hong Kong	51.84	
43	3	4	José Isaza	Panama	51.86	
44	4	8	Kalle Varonen	Finland	52.00	
45	7	3	José Meolans	Argentina	52.02	
46	2	2	Georgios Giziotis	Greece	52.04	
47	4	2	Tamer Hamed	Egypt	52.16	
48	3	3	Oleg Tsvetkovskiy	Uzbekistan	52.39	
49	2	7	Koh Yun-ho	South Korea	52.56	
50	3	2	Stavros Michaelides	Cyprus	52.65	
51	1	4	Darrick Bollinger	Guam	52.68	
52	1	5	Kenny Roberts	Seychelles	52.89	
53	2	4	Nikola Kalabić	FR Yugoslavia	52.98	
54	2	6	Diego Perdomo	Colombia	53.01	
55	3	5	Maxim Cazmirciuc	Moldova	53.18	
56	3	7	Huang Chih-yung	Chinese Taipei	53.47	
57	2	8	Sng Ju Wei	Singapore	53.50	
58	2	5	Juan Luis Bocanegra	Guatemala	54.05	
59	1	6	Diego Mularoni	San Marino	57.11	
60	1	3	Khuwaiter Al-Dhaheri	United Arab Emirates	57.70	
—	1	2	Ali Al-Gazali	Yemen	DNS	

=== Finals ===
==== Final B ====
Rank	Lane	Swimmer	Nation	Time	Notes
9	3	Jon Olsen	United States	49.80	
10	4	Christian Tröger	Germany	49.90	
11	8	Björn Zikarsky	Germany	49.91	
12	1	Sion Brinn	Jamaica	50.09	NR
13	2	Chris Fydler	Australia	50.31	
14	7	Rostyslav Svanidze	Ukraine	50.43	
15	5	Stephen Clarke	Canada	50.45	
16	6	Bartosz Kizierowski	Poland	50.51	

==== Final A ====
Hall led going into the turn, but Popov led coming out of it. Hall caught Popov again in the second length, but Popov pulled away at the finish.

Rank	Lane	Swimmer	Nation	Time	Notes
1st place, gold medalist(s)	4	Alexander Popov	Russia	48.74	
2nd place, silver medalist(s)	5	Gary Hall, Jr.	United States	48.81	
3rd place, bronze medalist(s)	3	Gustavo Borges	Brazil	49.02	
4	1	Pieter van den Hoogenband	Netherlands	49.13	NR
5	8	Fernando Scherer	Brazil	49.57	
6	7	Pavlo Khnykin	Ukraine	49.65	
7	2	Ricardo Busquets	Puerto Rico	49.68	
8	6	Francisco Sánchez	Venezuela	49.84	
