= 1998 European Short Course Swimming Championships – Men's 100 metre freestyle =

The finals and the qualifying heats of the Men's 100 metres Freestyle event at the 1998 European Short Course Swimming Championships were held on the first day of the competition, on Friday 11 December 1998 in Sheffield, England.

== Finals ==
RANK	FINAL	TIME
Gold medal	Lars Frölander (SWE)	47.54
Silver medal	Pieter van den Hoogenband (NED)	47.68
Bronze medal	Mark Veens (NED)	47.97
4.	Lars Conrad (GER)	48.61
5.	Yoav Bruck (ISR)	48.78
6.	Sion Brinn (GBR)	48.80
7.	Stephan Kunzelmann (GER)	48.97
8.	Karel Novy (SUI)	49.02

== Qualifying Heats ==
RANK	HEATS RANKING	TIME
1.	Lars Frölander (SWE)	47.92
2.	Pieter van den Hoogenband (NED)	48.07
3.	Mark Veens (NED)	48.31
4.	Lars Conrad (GER)	48.85
5.	Sion Brinn (GBR)	48.96
6.	Karel Novy (SUI)	48.97
7.	Yoav Bruck (ISR)	49.15
8.	Stephan Kunzelmann (GER)	49.34
9.	Indrek Sei (EST)	49.38
10.	Jere Hård (FIN)	49.41
11.	Aleh Rukhlevich (BLR)	49.50
12.	Matthew Kidd (GBR)	49.62
13.	Marijan Kanjer (CRO)	49.66
14.	Ludovic Depickère (FRA)	49.76
15.	Thierry Wouters (BEL)	49.80
16.	Anders Dahl (NOR)	49.96
17.	Christophe Bühler (SUI)	50.09
18.	Sebastien Lequeux (FRA)	50.14
19.	Roman Yegorov (RUS)	50.17
20.	Ivo Benda (CZE)	50.58
21.	Dzmitry Kalinouski (BLR)	50.65
22.	Nick O'Hare (IRL)	50.75
23.	Maciej Kajak (POL)	50.90
24.	Rastislav Kanuk (SVK)	51.32
25.	Ľuboš Križko (SVK)	51.42
—	Hugh O'Connor (IRL)	DNS
