= Swimming at the 1997 European Aquatics Championships – Men's 4 × 100 metre freestyle relay =

The final of the Men's 4 × 100 m Freestyle Relay event at the European LC Championships 1997 was held on Friday 1997-08-22 in Seville, Spain.

== Results ==
RANK	FINAL	TIME
	RUSSIA; Alexander Popov; Roman Yegorov; Denis Pimankov; Vladimir Pyshnenko	3:16.85 ER; 49.02; 49.53; 48.68; 49.62
	GERMANY; Alexander Lüderitz; Steffen Zesner; Christian Tröger; Torsten Spanneberg	3:18.33; 50.46; 49.51; 48.77; 49.59
	NETHERLANDS; Bram van Haandel; Martijn Zuijdweg; Mark Veens; Pieter van den Hoogenband	3:20.82; 50.93; 50.49; 50.01; 49.39
4.	GREAT BRITAIN; Nicholas Shackell; James Salter; Gavin Meadows; Mark Foster	3:21.15; 50.68; 50.23; 50.54; 49.70
5.	SWEDEN; Lars Frölander; Max von Bodungen; Anders Lyrbring; Jonas Åkesson	3:21.77; 49.65; 51.24; 50.65; 50.23
6.	ITALY; Lorenzo Vismara; Alessandro Bacchi; Marco de Simone; Massimiliano Rosolino	3:22.98; 50.30; 50.59; 51.61; 50.48
7.	ISRAEL; Yoav Bruck; Oren Azrad; Eran Groumi; Eithan Urbach	3:23.10; 50.46; 51.66; 51.01; 49.97
8.	SPAIN; Juan Benavides; José Maria Rojano; Javier Botello; Jesús Merino	3:23.74; 50.98; 51.29; 50.45; 51.02

== See also ==
- 1996 Men's Olympic Games 4 × 100 m Freestyle Relay
- 1997 Men's World Championships (SC) 4 × 100 m Freestyle Relay
