= 1998 European Short Course Swimming Championships – Men's 50 metre freestyle =

The finals and the qualifying heats of the Men's 50 metres Freestyle event at the 1998 European Short Course Swimming Championships were held on the third and last day of the competition, on Sunday 13 December 1998 in Sheffield, England.

== Finals ==
RANK	FINAL	TIME
Gold medal	Mark Foster (GBR)	21.31
Silver medal	Mark Veens (NED)	21.79
Bronze medal	Pieter van den Hoogenband (NED)	21.87
4.	Alexander Lüderitz (GER)	22.17
5.	Yoav Bruck (ISR)	22.35
6.	Sion Brinn (GBR)	22.40
7.	Cristoph Bühler (SUI)	22.44
8.	Dmitri Kalinovski (BLR)	22.45

== Qualifying Heats ==
RANK	HEATS RANKING	TIME
1.	Mark Foster (GBR)	21.48
2.	Pieter van den Hoogenband (NED)	21.81
3.	Mark Veens (NED)	22.01
4.	Alexander Lüderitz (GER)	22.02
5.	Sion Brinn (GBR)	22.37
6.	Yoav Bruck (ISR)	22.42
7.	Cristoph Bühler (SUI)	22.45
8.	Dmitri Kalinovski (BLR)	22.46
9.	Marijan Kanjer (CRO)	22.49
10.	Indrek Sei (EST)	22.50
11.	Thierry Wouters (BEL)	22.53
11.	Stephan Kunzelmann (GER)	22.53
11.	Ivo Benda (CZE)	22.53
14.	Oleg Rykhlevich (BLR)	22.55
15.	Anders Dahl (NOR)	22.67
16.	Jere Hård (FIN)	22.69
17.	Roman Yegorov (RUS)	22.77
18.	Pierrick Chavatte (FRA)	22.78
19.	Peter Mankoč (SLO)	22.96
20.	Jan Karlsson (SWE)	22.99
20.	Stavros Michaelides (CYP)	22.99
22.	Joakim Dahl (SWE)	23.07
23.	Bart Geerts (BEL)	23.11
24.	Peter Domanicky (SVK)	23.13
25.	Sebastien Lequeux (FRA)	23.17
26.	Rastislav Kanuk (SVK)	23.31
27.	Nick O'Hare (IRL)	23.35
28.	Maciej Kajak (POL)	23.42
29.	Hugh O'Connor (IRL)	23.81
