= 1997 FINA Short Course World Championships – Men's 100m freestyle =

The finals and the qualifying heats of the men's 100 metres freestyle event at the 1997 FINA Short Course World Championships were held on Saturday 1997-04-19 in Gothenburg, Sweden.

== Finals ==
RANK	FINAL A	TIME
	Francisco Sánchez (VEN)	47.86
	Gustavo Borges (BRA)	48.16
	Michael Klim (AUS)	48.21
4.	Lars Frölander (SWE)	48.24
5.	José Meolans (ARG)	48.65
6.	Ricardo Busquets (PUR)	49.08
7.	Yoav Bruck (ISR)	49.17
8.	Christian Tröger (GER)	49.26

RANK	FINAL B	TIME
9.	Sion Brinn (JAM)	48.66
9.	Marcos Hernández (CUB)	48.66
11.	Lars Conrad (GER)	49.19
12.	Oleg Rykhlevich (BLR)	49.20
13.	Fernando Scherer (BRA)	49.35
14.	Indrek Sei (EST)	49.52
15.	Richard Upton (AUS)	49.75
16.	Nicolae Ivan (ROM)	50.48

== See also ==
- Swimming at the 1996 Summer Olympics - Men's 100 metre freestyle
- European LC Championships 1997 - Men's 100 metre freestyle
