= Swimming at the 1995 European Aquatics Championships – Men's 100 metre freestyle =

The qualifying heats and the finals of the Men's 100 metres Freestyle event at the European LC Championships 1995 were held on Saturday 24 August 1995 in Vienna, Austria.

== Finals ==
RANK	FINAL A	TIME
	Alexander Popov (RUS)	49.10
	Torsten Spanneberg (GER)	49.67
	Björn Zikarsky (GER)	50.23
4.	Pavel Khnykin (UKR)	50.31
5.	Nicolae Ivan (ROM)	50.55
6.	Pieter van den Hoogenband (NED)	50.58
7.	Attila Czene (HUN)	50.70
8.	Nicholas Shackell (GBR)	50.77

RANK	FINAL B	TIME
9.	Yoav Bruck (ISR)	50.59
10.	Vladimir Predkin (RUS)	50.66
11.	Attila Zubor (HUN)	50.61
12.	Fredrik Letzler (SWE)	51.17
13.	Rafał Szukała (POL)	51.24
14.	Bartosz Kizierowski (POL)	51.33
15.	Earl McCarthy (IRL)	51.63
16.	Romain Barnier (FRA)	51.60

== See also ==
- 1993 Men's European Championships (LC) 100m Freestyle
- 1995 Men's World Championships (SC) 100m Freestyle
- 1996 Men's Olympic Games 100m Freestyle
- 1997 Men's European Championships (LC) 100m Freestyle
