= 1999 Pan Pacific Swimming Championships – Men's 50 metre freestyle =

Men's 50 metre freestyle at the 1999 Pan Pacific Swimming Championships
- Venue: Sydney International Aquatic Centre
- Dates: August 27, 1999 (heats & semifinals); August 28, 1999 (final)
- Competitors: 32 from 10 nations
- Winning time: 22.06

Medalists
gold medal	Brendon Dedekind	South Africa
silver medal	Gary Hall, Jr.	United States
bronze medal	Bill Pilczuk	United States

The men's 50 metre freestyle competition at the 1999 Pan Pacific Swimming Championships took place on August 27–28 at the Sydney International Aquatic Centre. The last champions were Bill Pilczuk of US and Ricardo Busquets of Puerto Rico.

This race consisted of one length of the pool in freestyle.

== Records ==
Prior to this competition, the existing world and Pan Pacific records were as follows:

World record	Tom Jager (USA)	21.81	Nashville, United States	March 24, 1990
Pan Pacific Championships record	Tom Jager (USA)	22.12	Tokyo, Japan	August 20, 1989

== Results ==
All times are in minutes and seconds.

KEY:	q	Fastest non-qualifiers	Q	Qualified	CR	Championships record	NR	National record	PB	Personal best	SB	Seasonal best

=== Heats ===
The first round was held on August 27.

Rank	Name	Nationality	Time	Notes
1	Brendon Dedekind	South Africa	22.16	Q
2	Gary Hall, Jr.	United States	22.47	Q
3	Jason Lezak	United States	22.64	Q
4	Neil Walker	United States	22.76	Q
5	Bill Pilczuk	United States	22.80	Q
6	Chris Fydler	Australia	22.86	Q
7	Tomohiro Yamanoi	Japan	22.90	Q
8	Jeffrey English	Australia	23.05	Q
9	Nathan Rickard	Australia	23.06	Q
10	Nicholas Folker	South Africa	23.16	Q
11	Jay Schryver	United States	23.34	
12	Greg Main-Baillie	South Africa	23.44	Q
13	Brad Schumacher	United States	23.45	
14	Shunsuke Ito	Japan	23.48	Q
14	Yannick Lupien	Canada	23.48	Q
16	Todd Pearson	Australia	23.54	Q
17	Ian Crocker	United States	23.55	
18	Craig Hutchison	Canada	23.64	Q
19	Brad Herring	New Zealand	23.79	Q
20	Wing Fu	Hong Kong	23.98	
21	Yosuke Ichikawa	Japan	24.03	
22	Jake Steele	Canada	24.06	
23	Scott Rice	New Zealand	24.19	
24	Shusuke Ito	Japan	24.26	
25	Carl Probert	Fiji	24.39	
26	Graham Duthie	Canada	24.40	
27	Gentle Offoin	Nigeria	24.45	
28	Mark Thompson	New Zealand	24.82	
29	Merlin Fredericks	South Africa	24.82	
30	Steven Ferguson	New Zealand	25.00	
31	Chen Lin-Hung	Chinese Taipei	25.18	
32	Pan Tsung-Nan	Chinese Taipei	25.78	

=== Semifinals ===
The semifinals were held on August 27.

Rank	Name	Nationality	Time	Notes
1	Brendon Dedekind	South Africa	22.14	Q
2	Gary Hall, Jr.	United States	22.44	Q
3	Bill Pilczuk	United States	22.59	Q
4	Neil Walker	United States	22.63	
5	Jason Lezak	United States	22.64	
5	Chris Fydler	Australia	22.64	Q
7	Nathan Rickard	Australia	22.80	Q
8	Nicholas Folker	South Africa	22.86	Q
9	Jeffrey English	Australia	22.90	
10	Tomohiro Yamanoi	Japan	23.06	Q
11	Shunsuke Ito	Japan	23.39	Q
12	Greg Main-Baillie	South Africa	23.49	
13	Yannick Lupien	Canada	23.49	
14	Brad Herring	New Zealand	23.55	
15	Todd Pearson	Australia	23.56	
16	Craig Hutchison	Canada	23.74	

=== Final ===
The final was held on August 28.

Rank	Lane	Nationality	Time	Notes
1st place, gold medalist(s)	Brendon Dedekind	South Africa	22.06	CR
2nd place, silver medalist(s)	Gary Hall, Jr.	United States	22.26	
3rd place, bronze medalist(s)	Bill Pilczuk	United States	22.52	
4	Chris Fydler	Australia	22.61	
5	Nathan Rickard	Australia	22.92	
6	Nicholas Folker	South Africa	22.93	
7	Tomohiro Yamanoi	Japan	22.98	
8	Shunsuke Ito	Japan	23.52	
