= Swimming at the 1991 World Aquatics Championships – Men's 50 metre freestyle =

Men's 50 metre freestyle at the 1991 World Aquatics Championships
- Location: Perth, Australia
- Dates: 12 January (heats and final)

The Men's 50 metre freestyle competition at the 1991 World Aquatics Championships were held on January 12, 1991.

== Records ==
Prior to the competition, the existing world and championship records were as follows.

World record	Tom Jager (USA)	21.81	Nashville, United States	24 March 1990
Competition record	Tom Jager (USA)	22.49	Madrid, Spain	1986

== Results ==
=== Heats ===
The heats will be held on 12 January at 10:21.

Rank	Heat	Lane	Name	Nationality	Time	Notes
1	5	4	Matt Biondi	United States	22.42	CR
2	6	4	Tom Jager	United States	22.56	
3	4	5	Dano Halsall	Switzerland	22.77	
4	4	2	Darren Lange	Australia	22.90	
5	4	6	Gennadiy Prigoda	Soviet Union	22.91	
6	6	5	Vladimir Tkachenko	Soviet Union	22.98	
7	5	5	Lars-Ove Jansson	Sweden	22.99	
8	6	3	Andrew Baildon	Australia	23.00	
9	5	3	Stéphan Caron	France	23.01	
10	6	3	Christophe Kalfayan	France	23.09	
11	5	6	Göran Titus	Sweden	23.20	
12	4	3	Christian Tröger	Germany	23.28	
13	4	1	Franz Mortensen	Denmark	23.29	
13	3	5	Ron Dekker	Netherlands	23.29	
15	5	2	Gustavo Borges	Brazil	23.38	
16	3	3	Paulo Manuel Trindade	Portugal	23.47	
17	5	7	Stéfan Voléry	Switzerland	23.51	
18	3	7	Austyn Shortman	Great Britain	23.53	
19	4	6	Nick Sanders	New Zealand	23.55	
20	6	6	Dean Kondziolka	Canada	23.59	
21	6	1	Erd Cabafi	Yugoslavia	23.61	
22	5	1	Feng Qiangbiao	China	23.64	
23	6	8	Rodrigo González	Mexico	23.70	
24	6	1	Shen Jianqiang	China	23.75	
25	3	2	Richard Granneman	Netherlands	23.80	
26	3	8	Yoav Bruck	Israel	23.86	
27	4	8	Michael Wright	Hong Kong	23.93	
28	2	6	Béla Szabados	Hungary	24.01	
29	5	8	Jarl Inge Melberg	Norway	24.20	
30	2	5	Richard Bera	Indonesia	24.21	
30	3	6	Yves Clausse	Luxembourg	24.21	
32	3	1	Todd Torres	Puerto Rico	24.24	
33	2	4	Janne Vermasheinä	Finland	24.31	
34	2	8	Allan Murray	Bahamas	24.49	
35	2	2	Gan Kheng Hui	Singapore	24.51	
36	2	3	José Gutiérrez	Mexico	24.54	
37	1	5	Patrick Sagisi	Guam	24.58	
38	2	1	Maciej Soszyński	Poland	24.67	
39	1	6	Wisnu Wardhana	Indonesia	25.25	
40	2	7	Sofiane Benchekor	Algeria	25.43	
41	1	4	Yeo Wie Jin	Singapore	25.48	
42	1	3	Chen Chun-hung	Chinese Taipei	25.52	
43	1	7	Ray Flores	Guam	26.35	
44	1	2	Michele Piva	San Marino	26.46	
45	1	8	Roberto Pellandra	San Marino	26.68	
46	1	1	Lok Hei	Macau	26.76	
	3	4	Emanuel Nascimento	Brazil	DNS	
	4	4	Nils Rudolph	Germany	DNS	

=== Finals ===
==== Final B ====
Rank	Lane	Name	Nationality	Time	Notes
9	5	Christophe Kalfayan	France	22.94	
10	3	Göran Titus	Sweden	23.06	
11	4	Stéphan Caron	France	23.11	
12	1	Gustavo Borges	Brazil	23.15	
13	6	Christian Tröger	Germany	23.18	
14	2	Franz Mortensen	Denmark	23.29	
15	7	Ron Dekker	Netherlands	23.39	
16	8	Paulo Manuel Trindade	Portugal	23.48	

==== Final A ====
Rank	Lane	Name	Nationality	Time	Notes
1st place, gold medalist(s)	5	Tom Jager	United States	22.16	CR
2nd place, silver medalist(s)	4	Matt Biondi	United States	22.26	
3rd place, bronze medalist(s)	2	Gennadiy Prigoda	Soviet Union	22.62	
4	1	Lars-Ove Jansson	Sweden	22.75	
4	7	Vladimir Tkachenko	Soviet Union	22.75	
6	3	Dano Halsall	Switzerland	22.83	
7	8	Andrew Baildon	Australia	22.87	
8	6	Darren Lange	Australia	22.88	
