= Swimming at the 1995 European Aquatics Championships – Men's 50 metre freestyle =

The qualifying heats and the finals of the Men's 50 metres Freestyle event at the European LC Championships 1995 were held on Saturday 26 August 1995 in Vienna, Austria.

== Finals ==
| RANK | FINAL A | TIME |
|---|---|---|
| | Alexander Popov (RUS) | 22.25 |
| | Christophe Kalfayan (FRA) | 22.63 |
| | Torsten Spanneberg (GER) | 22.66 |
| 4. | Mark Foster (GBR) | 22.76 |
| 5. | René Gusperti (ITA) | 22.77 |
| 6. | Yoav Bruck (ISR) | 22.79 |
| 6. | Pavel Khnykin (UKR) | 22.79 |
| 8. | Fredrik Letzler (SWE) | 23.06 |

| RANK | FINAL B | TIME |
|---|---|---|
| 9. | Raimundas Mažuolis (LTU) | 23.01 |
| 10. | Vladimir Predkin (RUS) | 23.05 |
| 11. | Silko Günzel (GER) | 23.30 |
| 12. | Pierrick Chavatte (FRA) | 23.36 |
| 13. | Dmitry Kalinovsky (BLR) | 23.41 |
| 14. | Yuriy Vlasov (UKR) | 23.46 |
| 15. | Carlos Sánchez (ESP) | 23.55 |
| 16. | Pie Geelen (NED) | 23.64 |

== Qualifying heats ==
| RANK | HEATS RANKING | TIME |
|---|---|---|
| 1. | Mark Foster (GBR) | 22.66 |
| 2. | Christophe Kalfayan (FRA) | 22.68 |
| 3. | Alexander Popov (RUS) | 22.79 |
| 4. | René Gusperti (ITA) | 22.83 |
| 5. | Pavel Khnykin (UKR) | 22.85 |
| 6. | Torsten Spanneberg (GER) | 22.90 |
| 7. | Yoav Bruck (ISR) | 22.90 |
| 8. | Fredrik Letzler (SWE) | 22.91 |
| 9. | Raimundas Mažuolis (LTU) | 22.95 |
| 10. | Vladimir Predkin (RUS) | 23.12 |
| 11. | Silko Günzel (GER) | 23.24 |
| 12. | Pierrick Chavatte (FRA) | 23.26 |
| 13. | Pie Geelen (NED) | 23.34 |
| 14. | Yuriy Vlasov (UKR) | 23.39 |
| 15. | Dmitry Kalinovsky (BLR) | 23.45 |
| 16. | Carlos Sánchez (ESP) | 23.50 |
| 17. | George Giziotis (GRE) | 23.53 |
| 18. | Alex Ioanovici (ROM) | 23.56 |
| 19. | Nicolae Ivan (ROM) | 23.58 |
| 20. | Hans Bijlemans (BEL) | 23.60 |
| 21. | Janne Blomqvist (FIN) | 23.61 |
| 22. | Béla Szabados (HUN) | 23.62 |
| 23. | Marijan Kanjer (CRO) | 23.67 |
| 24. | Håkan Karlsson (SWE) | 23.84 |
| 25. | Dimitri Ribinski (ISR) | 23.93 |

== See also ==
- 1995 Men's World Championships (SC) 50m Freestyle
- Swimming at the 1996 Summer Olympics - Men's 50 metre freestyle
