= 1995 FINA World Swimming Championships (25 m) – Men's 50 metre freestyle =

Brazilian swimming competition

These are the official results of the Men's 50 metres Freestyle event at the 1995 FINA Short Course World Championships, held in Rio de Janeiro, Brazil.

== Finals ==
RANK	FINAL A	TIME
	Francisco Sánchez (VEN)	21.80
	Fernando Scherer (BRA)	22.08
	Jiang Chengji (CHN)	22.17
4.	Gustavo Borges (BRA)	22.23
5.	Brett Hawke (AUS)	22.23
6.	José Meolans (ARG)	22.35
7.	Joakim Holmqvist (SWE)	22.52
8.	Sion Brinn (JAM)	22.53

== Qualifying heats ==
RANK	HEAT RANKING	TIME
1.	Francisco Sánchez (VEN)	22.11
2.	Jiang Chengji (CHN)	22.15
3.	Fernando Scherer (BRA)	22.19
4.	José Meolans (ARG)	22.38
5.	Gustavo Borges (BRA)	22.40
6.	Brett Hawke (AUS)	22.48
7.	Joakim Holmqvist (SWE)	22.55
8.	Sion Brinn (JAM)	22.57

== See also ==
- 1996 Men's Olympic Games 50m Freestyle
- 1995 Men's European LC Championships 50m Freestyle
- 1997 Men's European LC Championships 50m Freestyle
