= 1997 FINA Short Course World Championships – Men's 4 × 100 metre freestyle relay =

The finals and the qualifying heats of the Men's 4 × 100 metres Freestyle Relay event at the 1997 FINA Short Course World Championships were held on the last day of the competition, on Sunday 20 April 1997 in Gothenburg, Sweden.

== Final ==
Rank	Final	Time
	Germany; Lars Conrad; Christian Tröger; Alexander Lüderitz; Aimo Heilmann	3:14.08
	Sweden; Fredrik Letzler; Anders Holmertz; Ola Fagerstrand; Lars Frölander	3:14.22
	Australia; Michael Klim; Scott Logan; Richard Upton; Jeffrey English	3:14.83
4.	Great Britain	3:16.47
5.	Russia	3:16.68
6.	Canada	3:19.36
7.	Venezuela	3:21.07
—	Brazil	DSQ

== Qualifying heats ==
Rank	Heats	Time
1.	Australia	3:15.15
2.	Germany	3:16.66
3.	Sweden	3:17.04
4.	Russia	3:17.14
5.	Brazil	3:17.18
6.	Great Britain	3:17.56
7.	Canada	3:18.74
8.	Venezuela	3:20.07
9.	New Zealand	3:20.73
10.	United States	3:20.99
11.	Norway	3:21.20
12.	South Africa	3:22.50
13.	Argentina	3:23.12
14.	Switzerland	3:23.81
15.	Uzbekistan	3:24.99
16.	Chile	3:33.31
17.	Estonia	3:34.27

== See also ==
- 1996 Men's Olympic Games 4 × 100 m Freestyle Relay
- 1997 Men's European LC Championships 4 × 100 m Freestyle Relay
