= Zikarsky =

Zikarsky is a surname. Notable people with the surname include:

- Bengt Zikarsky (born 1967), German swimmer
- Björn Zikarsky (born 1967), German swimmer, twin brother of Bengt
- Rocco Zikarsky (born 2006), Australian basketball player
