= 1997 Pan Pacific Swimming Championships – Men's 50 metre freestyle =

Men's 50 metre freestyle at the 1997 Pan Pacific Swimming Championships
- Venue: NISHI Civic Pool
- Dates: August 13, 1997 (heats & finals)
- Competitors: 23 from 10 nations
- Winning time: 22.42

Medalists
gold medal	Bill Pilczuk	United States
gold medal	Ricardo Busquets	Puerto Rico
bronze medal	David Fox	United States

The men's 50 metre freestyle competition at the 1997 Pan Pacific Swimming Championships took place on August 13 at the NISHI Civic Pool. The last champion was Gary Hall, Jr. of US.

This race consisted of one length of the pool in freestyle.

== Records ==
Prior to this competition, the existing world and Pan Pacific records were as follows:

World record	Tom Jager (USA)	21.81	Nashville, United States	March 24, 1990
Pan Pacific Championships record	Tom Jager (USA)	22.12	Tokyo, Japan	August 20, 1989

== Results ==
All times are in minutes and seconds.

KEY:	q	Fastest non-qualifiers	Q	Qualified	CR	Championships record	NR	National record	PB	Personal best	SB	Seasonal best

=== Heats ===
The first round was held on August 13.

Rank	Name	Nationality	Time	Notes
1	Bill Pilczuk	United States	22.39	QA
2	David Fox	United States	22.54	QA
3	Neil Walker	United States	22.65	QA
4	Ricardo Busquets	Puerto Rico	22.79	QA
4	Brendon Dedekind	South Africa	22.79	QA
6	Michael Klim	Australia	22.99	QA
7	Scott Tucker	United States	23.01	QA
7	Jon Olsen	United States	23.01	QA
9	Scott Logan	Australia	23.02	QB
10	Josh Davis	United States	23.11	QB
11	Tomohiro Yamanoi	Japan	23.17	QB
12	Craig Hutchison	Canada	23.23	QB
13	Sion Brinn	Jamaica	23.29	QB
14	Shunsuke Ito	Japan	23.52	QB
14	Brad Schumacher	United States	23.52	QB
16	Lenny Krayzelburg	United States	23.67	QB
17	Uğur Taner	United States	23.83	
18	Ravil Nachaev	Uzbekistan	23.84	
19	Nicholas Tongue	New Zealand	23.87	
20	Richard Upton	Australia	23.92	
21	Derrick Bollinger	Guam	23.95	
22	John Steel	New Zealand	23.96	
23	Junya Kawakami	Japan	23.99	

=== B Final ===
The B final was held on August 13.

Rank	Name	Nationality	Time	Notes
9	Neil Walker	United States	22.74	
10	Sion Brinn	Jamaica	23.34	
11	Shunsuke Ito	Japan	23.50	
12	Richard Upton	Australia	23.75	
13	Nicholas Tongue	New Zealand	23.81	
14	Ravil Nachaev	Uzbekistan	24.11	
15	John Steel	New Zealand	24.20	
-	Derrick Bollinger	Guam	DNS	

=== A Final ===
The A final was held on August 13.

Rank	Lane	Nationality	Time	Notes
1st place, gold medalist(s)	Bill Pilczuk	United States	22.42	
1st place, gold medalist(s)	Ricardo Busquets	Puerto Rico	22.42	
3rd place, bronze medalist(s)	David Fox	United States	22.69	
4	Brendon Dedekind	South Africa	22.79	
5	Scott Logan	Australia	22.91	
6	Michael Klim	Australia	22.93	
7	Tomohiro Yamanoi	Japan	22.98	
8	Craig Hutchison	Canada	23.18	
