= Swimming at the 1992 Summer Olympics – Men's 4 × 100 metre freestyle relay =

Men's 4 × 100 metre freestyle relay at the Games of the XXV Olympiad
- Venue: Piscines Bernat Picornell
- Date: 29 July 1992 (heats & final)
- Competitors: 82 from 18 nations
- Teams: 18
- Winning time: 3:16.74

Medalists
1st place, gold medalist(s)		Joe Hudepohl, Matt Biondi, Tom Jager, Jon Olsen, Shaun Jordan*, Joel Thomas*	United States
2nd place, silver medalist(s)		Pavlo Khnykin, Gennadiy Prigoda, Iurie Başcatov, Alexander Popov, Vladimir Pyshnenko* Veniamin Tayanovich*	Unified Team
3rd place, bronze medalist(s)		Dirk Richter, Christian Tröger, Steffen Zesner, Mark Pinger, Andreas Szigat*, Bengt Zikarsky*; *Indicates the swimmer only competed in the preliminary heats.	Germany

The men's 4 × 100 metre freestyle relay event at the 1992 Summer Olympics took place on 29 July at the Piscines Bernat Picornell in Barcelona, Spain.

== Records ==
Prior to this competition, the existing world and Olympic records were as follows.

World record	United States (USA); Chris Jacobs (49.63); Troy Dalbey (49.75); Tom Jager (49.34); Matt Biondi (47.81)	3:16.53	Seoul, South Korea	23 September 1988
Olympic record	United States; Chris Jacobs (49.63); Troy Dalbey (49.75); Tom Jager (49.34); Matt Biondi (47.81)	3:16.53	Seoul, South Korea	23 September 1988

== Results ==
=== Heats ===
Rule: The eight fastest teams advance to the final (Q).

Rank	Heat	Lane	Nation	Swimmers	Time	Notes
1	3	4	Unified Team	Pavlo Khnykin (49.82); Vladimir Pyshnenko (49.31); Veniamin Tayanovich (49.52); Iurie Başcatov (48.83)	3:17.48	Q
2	1	4	United States	Joe Hudepohl (49.78); Shaun Jordan (49.94); Joel Thomas (50.04); Jon Olsen (48.74)	3:18.50	Q
3	2	5	Sweden	Håkan Karlsson (50.20); Göran Titus (50.54); Fredrik Letzler (49.18); Tommy Werner (49.00)	3:18.92	Q, NR
4	2	4	Germany	Mark Pinger (49.75); Andreas Szigat (50.27); Dirk Richter (49.73); Bengt Zikarsky (49.86)	3:19.61	Q
5	1	3	Brazil	José Carlos Souza (51.24); Gustavo Borges (49.07); Emanuel Nascimento (49.72); Cristiano Michelena (50.47)	3:20.50	Q, NR
6	2	3	Great Britain	Mike Fibbens (51.23); Mark Foster (49.93); Paul Howe (50.31); Roland Lee (49.94)	3:21.41	Q
7	3	3	France	Stéphan Caron (50.33); Frédéric Lefèvre (50.29); Ludovic Dépickère (51.02); Bruno Gutzeit (50.37)	3:22.01	Q
8	3	5	Australia	Chris Fydler (50.67); Andrew Baildon (50.68); Tom Stachewicz (50.56); Darren Lange (50.33)	3:22.24	Q
9	2	6	New Zealand	John Steel (50.76); Nicholas Sanders (50.50); Trent Bray (51.31); Mark Weldon (50.52)	3:23.09	NR
10	1	5	Italy	Giorgio Lamberti (51.12); Emanuele Idini (51.43); Roberto Gleria (50.82); Massimo Trevisan (50.06)	3:23.43	
11	3	2	South Africa	Darryl Cronjé (51.07); Peter Williams (50.06); Seddon Keyter (51.12); Craig Jackson (51.28)	3:23.53	AF
12	2	2	Finland	Jani Sievinen (51.53); Janne Vermasheinä (51.76); Janne Blomqvist (51.39); Vesa Hanski (50.79)	3:25.47	
13	1	2	Puerto Rico	Manuel Guzmán (51.90); Jorge Herrera (54.62); David Monasterio (52.77); Ricardo Busquets (51.19)	3:30.48	
14	2	7	Hong Kong	Arthur Li Kai Yien (51.93); Wu Tat Cheung (53.28); Kelvin Li Kar Wai (53.38); Michael Wright (52.02)	3:30.61	
15	3	7	Bermuda	Ian Steed Raynor (53.07); Michael Cash (52.35); Craig Morbey (53.51); Geribryan Mewett (52.24)	3:31.17	
16	1	7	Guam	Adrian Romero (55.37); Ray Flores (57.61); Frank Flores (55.69); Patrick Sagisi (53.64)	3:42.31	
17	3	1	Guatemala	Andrés Sedano (55.51); Roberto Bonilla (55.68); Helder Torres (56.95); Gustavo Bucaro (54.39)	3:42.53	
18	2	1	United Arab Emirates	Ahmad Faraj (56.03); Obaid Al-Rumaithi (59.79); Abdullah Sultan (58.64); Mohamed Bin Abid (57.14)	3:51.60	

=== Final ===
Rank	Lane	Nation	Swimmers	Time	Notes
1st place, gold medalist(s)	5	United States	Joe Hudepohl (50.05); Matt Biondi (48.69); Tom Jager (49.72); Jon Olsen (48.28)	3:16.74	
2nd place, silver medalist(s)	4	Unified Team	Pavlo Khnykin (49.92); Gennadiy Prigoda (50.05); Iurie Başcatov (49.76); Alexander Popov (47.83)	3:17.56	
3rd place, bronze medalist(s)	6	Germany	Christian Tröger (49.97); Dirk Richter (49.35); Steffen Zesner (49.78); Mark Pinger (48.80)	3:17.90	
4	1	France	Christophe Kalfayan (50.21); Franck Schott (49.83); Frédéric Lefèvre (50.47); Stéphan Caron (48.65)	3:19.16	NR
5	3	Sweden	Tommy Werner (49.93); Håkan Karlsson (49.88); Fredrik Letzler (50.60); Anders Holmertz (49.69)	3:20.10	
6	2	Brazil	José Carlos Souza (51.15); Gustavo Borges (48.90); Emanuel Nascimento (50.01); Cristiano Michelena (50.93)	3:20.99	
7	7	Great Britain	Roland Lee (50.97); Mark Foster (50.00); Mike Fibbens (50.45); Paul Howe (50.33)	3:21.75	
8	8	Australia	Chris Fydler (50.38); Andrew Baildon (50.70); Tom Stachewicz (50.65); Darren Lange (50.31)	3:22.04	
