= Kunzelmann =

Kunzelmann is a German surname. Notable people with the surname include:

- Dieter Kunzelmann (1939–2018), German activist
- Stephan Kunzelmann (born 1978), German swimmer
