= Lakhish, Israel =

Moshav in southern Israel

Lakhish: לכיש (Hebrew)
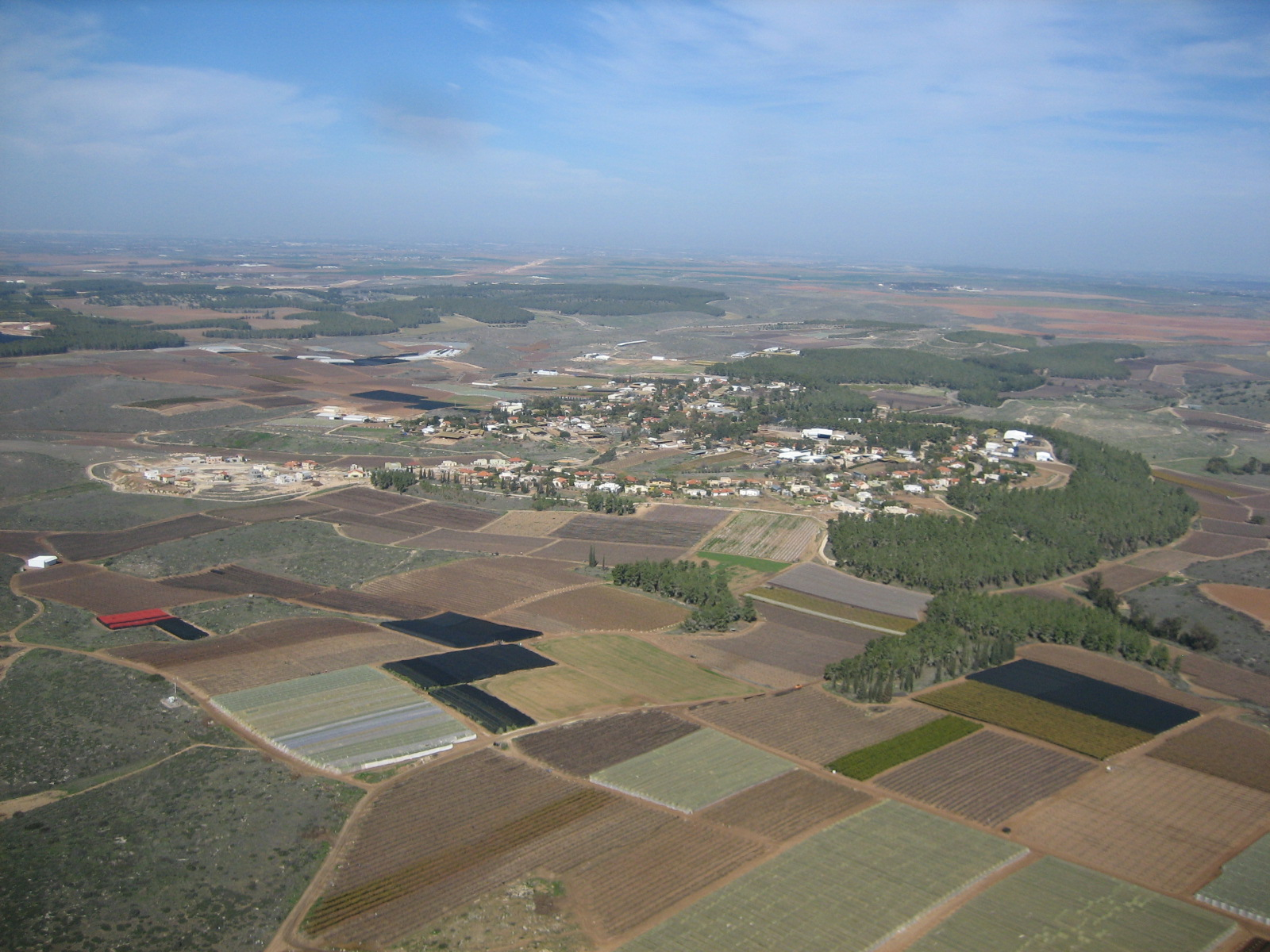
- Etymology: Named after Tel Lachish
- Location within Ashkelon region of Israel Location within Israel
- Coordinates: 31°33′42″N 34°50′34″E
- Country: Israel
- District: Southern
- Subdistrict: Ashkelon
- Council: Lakhish
- Affiliation: Moshavim Movement
- Founded: 1955
- Founder: Nahal
- Population (2024): 1,397

Lakhish (Hebrew: לכיש) is a moshav in the northern Negev in south-central Israel. Located south-east of Kiryat Gat, it falls under the jurisdiction of Lakhish Regional Council. In 2024, it had a population of 1,397.

The moshav was named after Tel Lachish, the ancient town of the same name, which is now an archaeological tell, just north of the moshav.

== History ==
=== Ancient Lachish ===
Modern Lakhish is located just beneath Tel Lachish, a tell (archaeological mound) that was once the site of an ancient biblical city sharing the same name. This location has seen habitation since the Neolithic, with numerous remnants discovered dating back to the Bronze Age, when the city found mention in various ancient Egyptian texts.

In the Iron Age, Lachish transformed into a fortified city of great significance within the Kingdom of Judah, ranking second only to the capital, Jerusalem. As such, the city was mentioned multiple times in the Hebrew Bible. The city gained international attention due to the unveiling of large reliefs discovered at Sennacherib's palace in Nineveh. These reliefs vividly portray the siege and conquest of Lachish by the Assyrian army. Both historical records and archaeological findings provide insight into the lives of the ancient Jewish inhabitants of Lachish, revealing their involvement in cultivating grapevines as a means of sustenance, a practice that continues in the present day.

=== Modern era ===
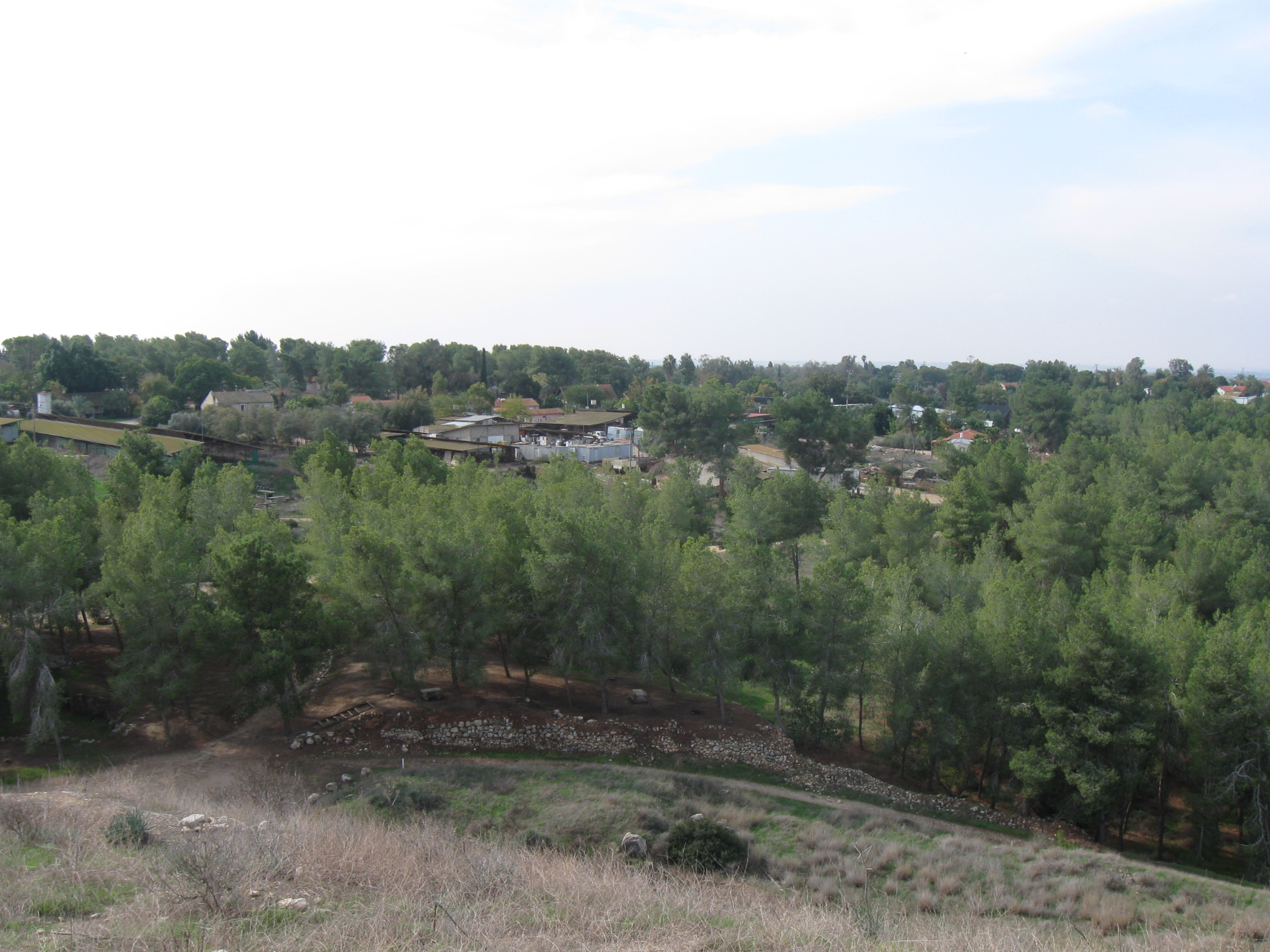
View of the moshav

The moshav was founded as a Nahal settlement in 1955 on land near the depopulated Palestinian village of al-Qubayba.

== Economy ==
The economy of Lakhish is based on the cultivation and sale of grapes. In 2006, the moshav built a large reservoir with a capacity of 1.25 million cubic meters to irrigate its 6,000 dunams of vineyards.

== Notable residents ==
- Yoav Bruck (born 1972), former Israeli swimmer
