= Juan Luis Bocanegra =

Guatemalan swimmer (born 1978)

Personal information
- Born: 21 July 1978 (age 47)

Sport
- Sport: Swimming

Juan Luis Bocanegra (born 21 July 1978) is a Guatemalan swimmer. He competed in the men's 100 metre freestyle event at the 1996 Summer Olympics.
