= Craig Morbey =

Bermudian swimmer (born 1968)

Personal information
- Born: 4 September 1968 (age 57)

Sport
- Sport: Swimming

Craig Morbey (born 4 September 1968) is a Bermudian swimmer. He competed in the men's 4 × 100 metre freestyle relay event at the 1992 Summer Olympics.
