= 2000 FINA World Swimming Championships (25 m) – Men's 50 m breaststroke =

== Finals ranking ==
WR	26.70	Mark Warnecke	GER	11 December 1998	Sheffield
CR	27.13	Brendon Dedekind	RSA	16 March 2000	Athens

== Final ==
Rank	Name	Nat	YB	R.T.	Time
1.	Mark Warnecke	GER	70	0.65	27.22
2.	Brendon Dedekind	RSA	76	0.60	27.27
3.	Oleg Lisogor	UKR	79	0.77	27.30
4.	ZHhu Yi	CHN	77	0.62	27.59
5.	Zeng Qiliang	CHN	77	0.71	27.61
5.	Daniel Málek	CZE	73	0.75	27.61
7.	Domenico Fioravanti	ITA	77	0.79	27.80
8.	Morgan Knabe	CAN	81	0.77	28.00
