= Bill Pilczuk =

American swimmer (born 1971)

Personal information
- Full name: William Pilczuk
- Nickname: "Bill"
- National team: United States
- Born: September 14, 1971 (age 55) Cape May Point, New Jersey, U.S.

Sport
- Sport: Swimming
- Strokes: Freestyle
- College team: Auburn University
Medal record
Men's swimming
Representing the United States
World Championships (LC)
Gold medal – first place	1998 Perth	50 m freestyle
Pan Pacific Championships
Gold medal – first place	1997 Fukuoka	50 m freestyle
Bronze medal – third place	1999 Sydney	50 m freestyle
Pan American Games
Silver medal – second place	1995 Mar del Plata	50 m freestyle

William Pilczuk (born September 14, 1971) is an American former competition swimmer and world champion. Pilczuk specialized in the 50-meter freestyle, winning medals in the event in the FINA world championships, Pan Pacific Championships, and Pan American Games.

Pilczuk is a native of Cape May Point, New Jersey. He graduated from Lower Cape May Regional High School, as a three-time All-Cape-Atlantic League swimmer, and swam for the Wildwood Crest Dolphins club swimming program.

Pilczuk was a walk-on at Miami-Dade Community College, where he earned a partial scholarship his second year. After graduating with an Associates in Liberal Arts, he transferred to Auburn University on a "books" athletic scholarship in Auburn, Alabama, where he competed for the Auburn Tigers swimming and diving team from 1991 to 1994. During his college career, he was a member of the Auburn Tiger's first ever SEC championship team, earned NCAA Academic All-American honors two consecutive years and three NCAA all-American awards. He graduated from Auburn with his bachelor's degree, magna cum laude, in 1994, a master's degree in Exercise Physiology in 1998, and completed the course work for a master's in Sociology.

Pilczuk won a silver medal in the 50-meter freestyle at the 1995 Pan American Games, gold at the 1997 Pan Pacific Championships and bronze at the 1999 Pan Pacific Championships. He won the World Championship title in his signature 50-meter freestyle event at the 1998 World Championships, with a time of 22.29 seconds. In the process, he defeated Russia's Alexander Popov in what USA Today called the "Upset of the Decade." He was also a five-time United States National Champion in the 50m freestyle, was a member of the Auburn University 4x50-short-course-meter medley relay World Record (1:36.69 - M.Andrews 24.77, G.Schmid 26.82, D Hutchinson 23.61, B Pilczuk 21.49) team in 1996. Pilczuk also set the American Record in the 50m freestyle (scm) at 21.56, in San Diego, CA, in 1999 on the lead off of a relay.

He served as an assistant coach for the Tigers swim team from 1997 to 2003, during which the Auburn men's team won their first-ever NCAA team championship in 1997, and the men's and women's teams won additional NCAA team championships in 2003. Pilczuk was the National Sprint coach and National Youth coach for Great Britain from 2003 to 2008, and was a coach on several international teams including the 2007 FINA World Championships LCM, Junior World Championships, European Championships, European Juniors, Australian Age-Group Championships, and the FINA World Cups. From 2008 to 2013, Pilczuk worked with individual swimmers, club teams, camps and clinics, including several 2012 Olympic team members. From August 2013, coached at the Savannah College of Art and Design, where he became Head Coach in April of the 2014-2015 swim season. The SCAD Bees won their first NAIA Championship in 6 years in 2016, earning Pilczuk the NAIA Women's Coach of the Year honors. He went on to win 3 of the next 4 NAIA women's titles. In March of 2020, after winning his 4th title, the program was put on pause due to Covid and he now works in ergonomics.
