= Nikola Kalabić (swimmer) =

Serbian swimmer (born 1978)

Personal information
- Born: 25 October 1978 (age 48)

Sport
- Sport: Swimming

Nikola Kalabić (born 25 October 1978) is a Serbian swimmer. He competed at the 1996 Summer Olympics and the 2000 Summer Olympics.
