= Bengt Zikarsky =

German swimmer

Medal record

Men's swimming

Representing Germany

Olympic Games
Bronze medal – third place	1992 Barcelona	4×100 m freestyle
Bronze medal – third place	1996 Atlanta	4×100 m freestyle

World Championships (LC)

Representing Germany
Silver medal – second place	1991 Perth	4×100 m freestyle

European Championships (LC)

Representing West Germany
Gold medal – first place	1989 Bonn	4×100 m freestyle

Representing Germany
Bronze medal – third place	1993 Sheffield	4×100 m freestyle

Bengt Zikarsky (born 17 July 1967 in Erlangen) is a former freestyle swimmer from Germany, who won the bronze medal in the 4×100 m freestyle relay at the 1996 Summer Olympics in Atlanta, Georgia. He did so alongside Christian Tröger, his twin brother Björn Zikarsky and Mark Pinger. He also won the bronze medal at the same event at the 1992 Summer Olympics in Barcelona, after swimming in the heats. He is the uncle of Rocco Zikarsky, one of Björn's sons, who plays in the NBA for the Minnesota Timberwolves.
