= Janne Vermasheinä =

Finnish swimmer (born 1970)

Personal information
- Born: 13 January 1970 (age 56) Kouvola, Finland

Sport
- Sport: Swimming

Janne Vermasheinä (born 13 January 1970) is a Finnish freestyle swimmer. He competed in the men's 4 × 100 metre freestyle relay event at the 1992 Summer Olympics.
