= Mark Pinger =

German swimmer

Personal information
- Born: 26 June 1970 (age 56)
Medal record
Men's swimming
Representing Germany
Olympic Games
Bronze medal – third place	1992 Barcelona	4x100 m freestyle
Bronze medal – third place	1996 Atlanta	4x100 m freestyle
European Championships (SC)
Silver medal – second place	1992 Espoo	50 m freestyle

Mark Pinger (born 26 June 1970) is a former freestyle swimmer from Germany, who won a total number of two bronze medals as a relay member at the Summer Olympics.

Pinger first did so in 1992 alongside Christian Tröger, Dirk Richter, and Steffen Zesner. Four years later, when Atlanta, Georgia hosted the Summer Olympics, he and Tröger finished third alongside brothers Bengt Zikarsky and Björn Zikarsky.

Pinger was born in Kenzingen, Baden-Württemberg. He now lives in Oregon and is the General Manager for Arena North America. He swims on a regular basis with a Masters program at Stafford Hills Club which has an outdoor short course salt water pool located in Tualatin, OR.
