= Paulo Trindade =

Portuguese swimmer

Personal information
- Born: 22 January 1967 (age 59)

Sport
- Sport: Swimming

Paulo Trindade (born 22 January 1967) is a Portuguese sprint freestyle swimmer. He competed at the 1988, 1992 and the 1996 Summer Olympics in the 50 m freestyle.
