= Christophe Bühler =

Swiss swimmer

Personal information
- Full name: Christophe Bühler
- National team: Switzerland
- Born: 2 January 1974 (age 52) Langenthal, Switzerland
- Height: 1.87 m (6 ft 2 in)
- Weight: 75 kg (165 lb)

Sport
- Sport: Swimming
- Strokes: Freestyle
- Club: Schwimmklub Langenthal
- Coach: Michel Tavcar

Christophe Bühler (born 2 January 1974) is a Swiss former swimmer, who specialized in sprint freestyle events. He is a single-time Olympian (2000), a ten-time member of the Swiss swimming team, and an 11-time national titleholder in the 50 m freestyle. Before his retirement in 2006, Buhler trained for the Langenthal Swimming Club under his personal coach Michel Tavcar.

Buhler competed in the men's 50 m freestyle at the 2000 Summer Olympics in Sydney. He posted a FINA B-standard entry time of 22.85 from the Swiss National Championships in Zurich. He challenged seven other swimmers in heat seven, including top favorites Jiang Chengji of China and Attila Zubor of Hungary. He edged out Croatia's Marijan Kanjer by a hundredth of a second (0.01) to earn a fifth spot in 23.15. Buhler failed to advance into the semifinals, as he placed thirty-first overall in the preliminaries.
