= Thierry Wouters =

Belgian swimmer (born 1979)

Personal information
- Nickname: Thierry Wouters
- National team: Belgium
- Born: 12 July 1979 (age 46) Nivelles, Belgium
- Height: 1.88 m (6 ft 2 in)
- Weight: 76 kg (168 lb)

Sport
- Sport: Swimming
- Strokes: Freestyle

Thierry Wouters (born 12 July 1979) is a Belgian former swimmer, who specialized in sprint freestyle events. He is a single-time Olympian (2000) and a former Belgian record holder in the 50 and 100 m freestyle.

Wouters made an international headline at the 1999 European Short Course Swimming Championships, when he set a Belgian record of 22.35 to earn a sixth spot in the 50 m freestyle.

At the 2000 Summer Olympics in Sydney, Wouters competed in a sprint freestyle double. He posted FINA B-standards of 22.92 (50 m freestyle) and 50.50 (100 m freestyle) from the Belgian Championships in Antwerp. In the 100 m freestyle, Wouters placed thirty-second on the morning's prelims. Swimming in heat seven, he edged out Finland's Jere Hård to pick up a seventh spot by four-hundredths of a second (0.04) in 51.07. Two days later, in the 50 m freestyle, Wouters challenged seven other swimmers in heat six, including Ukraine's rising favorite Oleksandr Volynets and Lithuania's Rolandas Gimbutis, the tallest swimmer at the Games. Because one swimmer out of the race for no false-start rule, Wouters rounded out the field to last place and thirty-ninth overall in 23.44, more than half a second (0.50) off his record and entry time.
