= Mark Veens =

Dutch swimmer

Personal information
- Full name: Mark Hermanus Maria Veens
- Nationality: Dutch
- Born: 26 June 1978 (age 47) Venray, Limburg, Netherlands

Sport
- Sport: Swimming
- Strokes: Freestyle
Medal record
Men's swimming
Representing the Netherlands
Olympic Games
Silver medal – second place	2004 Athens	4×100 m freestyle
World Championships (LC)
Silver medal – second place	2001 Fukuoka	4×100 m freestyle
World Championships (SC)
Silver medal – second place	1999 Hong Kong	4×100 m freestyle
Bronze medal – third place	1999 Hong Kong	50 m freestyle
European Championships (LC)
Gold medal – first place	1999 Istanbul	4×100 m freestyle
Bronze medal – third place	1997 Seville	4×100 m freestyle
European Championships (SC)
Gold medal – first place	1998 Sheffield	4×50 m freestyle
Gold medal – first place	2002 Riesa	4×50 m freestyle
Gold medal – first place	2003 Dublin	4×50 m freestyle
Gold medal – first place	2005 Triest	4×50 m freestyle
Silver medal – second place	1998 Sheffield	50 m freestyle
Silver medal – second place	2004 Vienna	50 m freestyle
Bronze medal – third place	1998 Sheffield	100 m freestyle

Mark Hermanus Maria Veens (born 26 June 1978 in Venray, Limburg) is a freestyle swimmer from the Netherlands, who competed for his native country at three consequentive Summer Olympics, starting in 1996 in Atlanta, Georgia as a member of the 4×100 m freestyle (fifth place).

Veens' finest hour came at the 1998 European Short Course Swimming Championships in Sheffield, where he ended up in second place in the 50 m freestyle. Half a year later, at the 1997 FINA World Swimming Championships (25 m) in Hong Kong, he won the bronze medal in the 50 m freestyle.

== See also ==
- Dutch records in swimming
