= Oren Azrad =

Israeli swimmer

Personal information
- Native name: אורן אזרד
- Full name: Oren Eliahu Azrad
- National team: Israel
- Born: 19 June 1976 (age 50) Rehovot, Israel
- Height: 1.86 m (6 ft 1 in)
- Weight: 87 kg (192 lb)

Sport
- Sport: Swimming
- Strokes: Freestyle
- College team: University of Alabama (U.S.)
- Coach: Jonty Skinner (U.S.)

Oren Eliahu Azrad (Hebrew: אורן אזרד; born June 19, 1976) is an Israeli former swimmer, who specialized in sprint freestyle events. He represented Israel at the 2000 Summer Olympics, and also earned Southeastern Conference and All-American honors as a member of the University of Alabama's swimming and diving team, while studying in the United States

Azrad accepted an athletic scholarship to attend the University of Alabama in Tuscaloosa, Alabama, where he trained for the Alabama Crimson Tide swimming and diving team, under South African-based head coach Jonty Skinner, from 1998 to 2002. While swimming for the Crimson Tide, he received both Southeastern Conference and All-American honors in the 800-yard freestyle relay after finishing ninth from the 2000 NCAA Men's Swimming and Diving Championships. At the U.S. Open on that same year, Azrad helped his team earn a third-place finish, following their relentless triumph in the 400-yard freestyle relay. During his collegiate season, he posted top-ten career bests in the 50-yard freestyle (20.30), 100-yard freestyle (43.97), 200-yard freestyle (1:36.34), 100-yard backstroke (48.92), and 200-yard backstroke (1:48.26).

Azrad also competed for Israel in the 4 × 100 m freestyle relay at the 2000 Summer Olympics in Sydney. Teaming with Alexei Manziula, Eithan Urbach, and Yoav Bruck in heat three, Azrad swam the third leg and recorded a split of 50.68, but the Israelis came up short to sixth place and fourteenth overall in a national record of 3:22.06.
