= Yuriy Vlasov =

Ukrainian swimmer (born 1970)

Personal information
- Full name: Юрій Власов
- Nationality: Ukraine
- Born: 15 March 1970 (age 56)

Sport
- Sport: Swimming
- Strokes: Freestyle
Medal record
European Championships (SC)
Gold medal – first place	1992 Espoo	50 m freestyle

Yuriy Vlasov (born 15 March 1970) is a retired male freestyle swimmer from Ukraine. He competed for his native country at the 1996 Summer Olympics in Atlanta, Georgia, finishing in 11th place in the men's 50 m freestyle event.
