= Tomohiro Yamanoi =

Japanese swimmer

Personal information
- Born: June 4, 1977 (age 49) Ibaraki, Japan

Sport
- Sport: Swimming
Medal record
Representing Japan
World Championships (LC)
Bronze medal – third place	2001 Fukuoka	50 m freestyle
Asian Games
Gold medal – first place	1998 Bangkok	4x100m freestyle relay
Silver medal – second place	1998 Bangkok	50m freestyle
Summer Universiade
Bronze medal – third place	2001 Beijing	50m freestyle

Tomohiro Yamanoi (山野井 智広, Yamanoi Tomohiro; born June 4, 1977) is a Japanese freestyle swimmer.

== Major achievements ==
- 1998 Asian Games - 50m freestyle 2nd (23.26)
- 2001 World Championships - 50m freestyle 3rd (22.18)

== Personal bests ==
In long course:

- 50m freestyle: 22.18 Asian, Japanese Record (July 28, 2001)

== See also ==
- Eri Yamanoi
