= Nathan Rickard =

Australian swimmer

Personal information
- Born: Nathan Craig Rickard

Sport
- Country: Australia
- Sport: Swimming
- Event: Freestyle
Medal record
Universiade
Gold medal – first place	1997 Sicily	50 m freestyle
FINA World Championships
Silver medal – second place	1998 Perth	4 × 100 m freestyle

Nathan Craig Rickard is an Australian former freestyle swimmer.

Rickard, elder brother of swimmer Brenton, was the World Student Games 50 metre freestyle gold medalist in 1997, setting an Australian record of 22.50s in the process. He upset world record holder Michael Klim to win the 50 metre freestyle at the 1997 Australian Swimming Championships. This qualified him for the 1998 World Championships in Perth, where he placed 12th in the 50 metre freestyle and swam heats on the silver medal-winning 4 × 100 metre freestyle relay team. He won the national 50 metre freestyle title again in 1998 and came fourth in that event at the Kuala Lumpur Commonwealth Games later that year. In 1999 he was fifth in the 50 metre freestyle at the Pan Pacific Swimming Championships.
