= Alexander Lüderitz =

German swimmer

Medal record

Men's swimming

Representing Germany

Olympic Games
Bronze medal – third place	1996 Atlanta	4×100 m freestyle

World Championships (SC)
Gold medal – first place	1997 Gothenburg	4×100 m freestyle

European Championships (LC)
Silver medal – second place	1997 Seville	4×100 m freestyle

European Championships (SC)
Gold medal – first place	1998 Sheffield	4×50 m medley

Alexander Lüderitz (born 6 August 1973) is a former freestyle swimmer from Berlin, who swam in the qualifying heats of the 4×100 m freestyle relay at the 1996 Summer Olympics in Atlanta, Georgia. In the final, he was replaced by Christian Tröger who, alongside Bengt Zikarsky, Björn Zikarsky, and Mark Pinger won the bronze medal.
