= Stephan Kunzelmann =

German swimmer (born 1978)

Personal information
- Born: 22 November 1978 (age 47) Hannover, West Germany
- Height: 1.95 m (6 ft 5 in)
- Weight: 96 kg (212 lb)

Sport
- Sport: Swimming
- Club: SGS Hannover
Medal record
Men's swimming
Representing Germany
World Championships (SC)
Bronze medal – third place	2000 Athens	4×100 m freestyle
European Championships (SC)
Gold medal – first place	1998 Sheffield	4×50 m medley
Bronze medal – third place	1998 Sheffield	4×50 m freestyle
European Championships (LC)
Gold medal – first place	2002 Berlin	4×100 m freestyle
Silver medal – second place	2000 Helsinki	4×100 m freestyle

Stephan Kunzelmann (born 22 November 1978) is a retired German freestyle swimmer who won three medals in the 4 × 100 m freestyle relay at the 2000 FINA World Swimming Championships (25 m) and 2000 and 2002 European Aquatics Championships. He competed in the same event at the 2000 and 2004 Summer Olympics and finished fourth and eights, respectively. He also won two medals in the 4×50 m freestyle and medley relays at the European Short Course Swimming Championships 1998.
