= Björn Zikarsky =

German swimmer (born 1967)

Medal record

Men's swimming

Representing Germany

Olympic Games
Bronze medal – third place	1996 Atlanta	4×100 m freestyle

European Championships (LC)

Representing West Germany
Gold medal – first place	1989 Bonn	4×100 m freestyle

Representing Germany
Silver medal – second place	1995 Vienna	4×100 m freestyle
Bronze medal – third place	1995 Vienna	100 m freestyle
Bronze medal – third place	1995 Vienna	4×100 m medley

Björn Zikarsky (born 17 July 1967) is a former freestyle swimmer from Germany, who won the bronze medal in the 4×100 m freestyle relay at the 1996 Summer Olympics in Atlanta, Georgia. He did so alongside Christian Tröger, his twin brother Bengt Zikarsky and Mark Pinger. He also competed in the 1988 Summer Olympics for West Germany.

Zikarsky lives between Brisbane and the Sunshine Coast of Australia. He stands at 6'10" tall making him one of the tallest swimmers to ever compete in the Olympics. He has 4 kids with Kylie, a former Elite Surf Lifesaving Competitor and Ironwoman competitor: Ruben, Jade, Lennox, and Rocco. Rocco, who stands 7'3", in 2023 (at age 16) became a professional basketball player in the NBL for the Brisbane Bullets and now plays for the Minnesota Timberwolves in the NBA.
