= Marcos Hernández (swimmer) =

Cuban swimmer (born 1978)

Personal information
- Born: November 1, 1978 (age 47) Varadero, Cuba
Medal record
Men's Swimming
Representing Cuba
Pan American Games
Bronze medal – third place	1999 Winnipeg	50m Freestyle
Summer Universiade
Gold medal – first place	1997 Catania	100m Freestyle

Marcos Antonio Hernández Rodríguez (born November 1, 1978, in Varadero, Matanzas) is a former international freestyle swimmer from Cuba, who participated in two consecutive Summer Olympics for his native country, starting in 2000. He won the bronze medal in the Men's 50m Freestyle at the 1999 Pan American Games.
