= Aleksandr Popov (swimmer) =

Russian swimmer

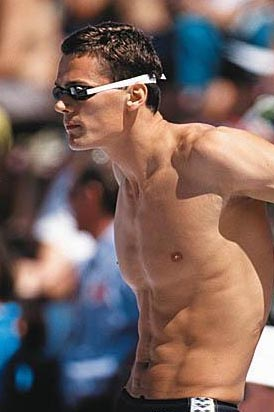

Personal information
- Full name: Алекса́ндр Влади́мирович Попо́в; Aleksandr Vladimirovich Popov
- Nicknames: The Russian Rocket; Czar of Swimming; King of Short Distance
- Nationality: Russian
- Born: 16 November 1971 (age 54) Lesnoy, Sverdlovsk, Russian SFSR, Soviet Union
- Height: 2.01 m (6 ft 7 in)
- Weight: 87 kg (192 lb)

Sport
- Sport: Swimming
- Strokes: Freestyle; 1989–2005; Backstroke; 1979–1989
- Club: Dynamo Moscow
Medal record
Event	1st	2nd	3rd
Olympic Games	4	5	0
World Championships (LC)	6	4	1
World Championships (SC)	0	0	2
European Championships (LC)	21	3	2
European Championships (SC)	2	0	0
Total	33	12	5
Olympic Games
Representing the Unified Team
Gold medal – first place	1992 Barcelona	50 m freestyle
Gold medal – first place	1992 Barcelona	100 m freestyle
Silver medal – second place	1992 Barcelona	4×100 m freestyle
Silver medal – second place	1992 Barcelona	4×100 m medley
Representing Russia
Gold medal – first place	1996 Atlanta	50 m freestyle
Gold medal – first place	1996 Atlanta	100 m freestyle
Silver medal – second place	1996 Atlanta	4×100 m freestyle
Silver medal – second place	1996 Atlanta	4×100 m medley
Silver medal – second place	2000 Sydney	100 m freestyle
World Championships (LC)
Representing Russia
Gold medal – first place	1994 Rome	50 m freestyle
Gold medal – first place	1994 Rome	100 m freestyle
Gold medal – first place	1998 Perth	100 m freestyle
Gold medal – first place	2003 Barcelona	50 m freestyle
Gold medal – first place	2003 Barcelona	100 m freestyle
Gold medal – first place	2003 Barcelona	4×100 m freestyle
Silver medal – second place	1994 Rome	4×100 m freestyle
Silver medal – second place	1994 Rome	4×100 m medley
Silver medal – second place	1998 Perth	50 m freestyle
Silver medal – second place	2003 Barcelona	4×100 m medley
Bronze medal – third place	1998 Perth	4×100 m freestyle
World Championships (SC)
Representing Russia
Bronze medal – third place	2002 Moscow	50 m freestyle
Bronze medal – third place	2002 Moscow	4×100 m freestyle
European Championships (LC)
Representing Soviet Union
Gold medal – first place	1991 Athens	100 m freestyle
Gold medal – first place	1991 Athens	4×100 m freestyle
Gold medal – first place	1991 Athens	4×100 m medley
Representing Russia
Gold medal – first place	1993 Sheffield	50 m freestyle
Gold medal – first place	1993 Sheffield	100 m freestyle
Gold medal – first place	1993 Sheffield	4×100 m freestyle
Gold medal – first place	1993 Sheffield	4×100 m medley
Gold medal – first place	1995 Vienna	50 m freestyle
Gold medal – first place	1995 Vienna	100 m freestyle
Gold medal – first place	1995 Vienna	4×100 m freestyle
Gold medal – first place	1995 Vienna	4×100 m medley
Gold medal – first place	1997 Seville	50 m freestyle
Gold medal – first place	1997 Seville	100 m freestyle
Gold medal – first place	1997 Seville	4×100 m freestyle
Gold medal – first place	1997 Seville	4×100 m medley
Gold medal – first place	2000 Helsinki	50 m freestyle
Gold medal – first place	2000 Helsinki	100 m freestyle
Gold medal – first place	2000 Helsinki	4×100 m freestyle
Gold medal – first place	2000 Helsinki	4×100 m medley
Gold medal – first place	2002 Berlin	4×100 m medley
Gold medal – first place	2004 Madrid	50 m freestyle
Silver medal – second place	1999 Istanbul	100 m freestyle
Silver medal – second place	1999 Istanbul	4×100 m freestyle
Silver medal – second place	2002 Berlin	100 m freestyle
Bronze medal – third place	1999 Istanbul	50 m freestyle
Bronze medal – third place	1999 Istanbul	4×100 m medley
European Championships (SC)
Representing Soviet Union
Gold medal – first place	1991 Gelsenkirchen	50 m freestyle
Gold medal – first place	1991 Gelsenkirchen	4×50 m medley relay
Silver medal – second place	1991 Gelsenkirchen	4×50 m freestyle relay

Aleksandr Vladimirovich Popov (Russian: Алекса́ндр Влади́мирович Попо́в, born 16 November 1971), better known as Alexander Popov, is a Russian former swimmer. Widely considered the greatest sprint swimmer in history, Popov won gold in the 50-metre and 100 m freestyle at the 1992 Olympics and repeated the feat at the 1996 Olympics, and is the only male in Olympic games history to defend both titles. He held the world record in the 50 m for eight years, and the 100 m for six. In 2003, aged 31, he won 50 m and 100 m gold at the 2003 World Championships.

== Swimming ==
Popov began swimming at age 8 at the Children and Youth Sports School of Fakel Sports Complex in Lesnoy, at that time afraid of water. However, his father insisted on him taking swimming lessons in that sports school, and in his own words, he has "been stuck there ever since". Popov started out as a backstroker but switched to freestyle when he joined Gennadi Touretski's squad in 1990 on the initiative by the head coach of the USSR National Team Gleb Petrov. He later moved from Russia to Australia to be with his coach.

Popov won the men's 50 m and 100 m freestyle in the Barcelona Olympics in 1992, and repeated his victories in the 1996 Atlanta Olympics, becoming the first man to do so since Johnny Weissmuller. He presented Touretski with his 1996 Olympic gold medal from the 100 m freestyle. "I have a title and I'm on the paper, but, you know, Gennadi hasn't gotten anything from Atlanta or from Barcelona," Popov said. "But I know how much this particular medal means for him, is worth for him."

One month after the Atlanta Olympics, he was stabbed in the abdomen with a knife during a dispute with three Moscow street vendors. The knife sliced his artery, grazed one of his kidneys and damaged the pleura, the membrane that encases the lungs. He had emergency surgery and spent three months in rehabilitation. At the 1997 European Championships in Seville, Spain, he successfully defended his 50 m and 100 m freestyle titles.

In 2000, he beat the world record in the 50-metre freestyle in a time of 21.64 at Russia's Olympic Trials in Moscow. Popov, considered one of the most technically sound swimmers of all time, took just 31 strokes to set the world mark, which would last nearly eight years.

Popov finished second in the 100 meter freestyle at the 2000 Olympics.

At the 2003 Barcelona World Championships, Popov once again made a clean sweep of the men's 50 m and 100 m freestyle events, citing that Barcelona would always be special to him, for it was there that for him, everything first began.

He announced his participation in the 2004 Athens Olympics. Moreover, he was the Flagbearer of Russia in the opening ceremony. Popov was the oldest competitor at the pool, and finished 9th in the men's 50 m and 18th in the 100 m freestyle.

He announced his retirement from the sport in January 2005.

== Post swimming ==
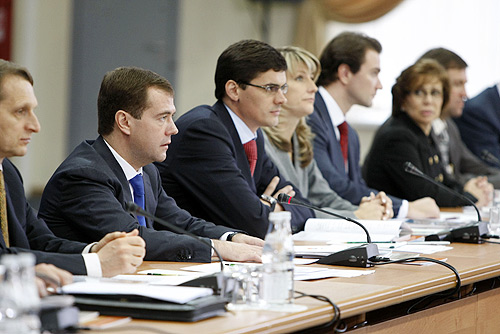
Popov at the Kremlin in 2008

Popov was elected a full member of the International Olympic Committee in December 1999. He also represents the athletes on the IOC Sport for All Commission and was elected directly as one of seven athletes to the IOC Athletes' Commission by the athletes participating in the 1996 Olympics. He was re-elected to the Athletes Commission at the 2000 Games and is now Honorary Secretary. He was awarded the 1996 Russian Medal of Honour for contributions to sport. He was also named Russian Athlete of the Year and European Sports Press Union Athlete of the Year in 1996.

In June 2003, he confirmed that he was permanently leaving Australia in early 2004 to live in Solothurn, Switzerland. He said the move followed the offer of a business proposition in Switzerland, once he had retired from swimming. He retained Touretski as a long-distance coach.

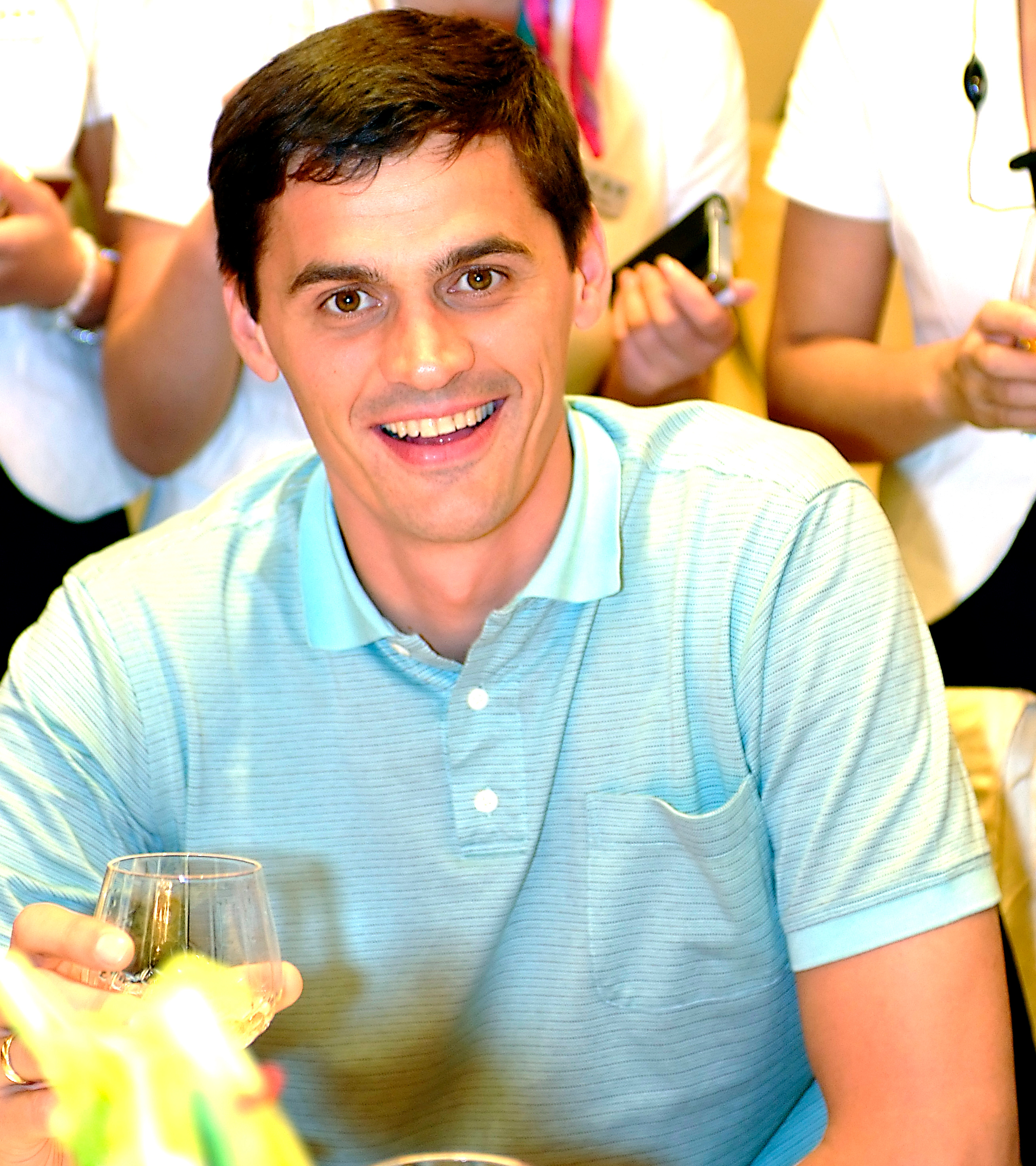
Alexander Popov during the 2008 Summer Olympics

Popov earned both a bachelor's and a master's degree in sports coaching from the Russian Academy.

He is a spokesman for Omega SA alongside other swimmers such as Ian Thorpe.

He appeared at the closing ceremony of the Beijing Olympics after being elected a member of the IOC, presenting flowers to volunteers. He was named to the Evaluation Commission for the 2016 Summer Olympics.

In 2009, he served as the chairman of the RC Lokomotiv Moscow rugby league club.

Since May 2009 he has been a member of the supervisory board of Adidas.

== Personal life ==
In 1997, Popov married Darya Shmeleva, a Russian Olympic swimmer he had dated since 1995. They have two sons, Vladimir (born 1997) and Anton (born 2000), and a daughter, Mia (born 2010).

Popov is a friend of wrestler Aleksandr Karelin.

== Controversy ==
On 4 July 2019, the International Olympic Committee accused Alexander Popov, and eight other members of the IOC, of accepting bribes in order to secure their votes for Rio de Janeiro as host of the 2016 Summer Olympics. The former governor of Rio de Janeiro, Sérgio Cabral Filho, contended in court that he paid $2 million to Lamine Diack, the former president of the International Association of Athletics Federation, which it was known as at the time, in order to secure votes. On 5 July 2019, Popov denied these allegations, citing that he did not take any money in return for his vote.

== Honors and awards ==
- Order of Merit for the Fatherland, 3rd class
- Order of Friendship
- Honoured Master of Sports

== See also ==
- List of members of the International Swimming Hall of Fame
- World record progression 50 metres freestyle
- World record progression 100 metres freestyle
- List of multiple Olympic medalists at a single Games
- List of multiple Olympic gold medalists
- List of multiple Summer Olympic medalists

Records
Preceded by Matt Biondi	Men's 100 metre freestyle world record holder (long course); 18 June 1994 – 16 September 2000	Succeeded by Michael Klim
Preceded by Gustavo Borges	Men's 100 metre freestyle world record holder (short course); 1 January 1994 – 27 March 2004	Succeeded by Ian Crocker
Preceded by Tom Jager	Men's 50 metre freestyle world record holder (long course); 16 June 2000 – 17 February 2008	Succeeded by Eamon Sullivan
Preceded by Mark Foster	Men's 50 metre freestyle world record holder (short course); 13 March 1994 – 13 December 1998	Succeeded by Mark Foster
Awards
Preceded by Károly Güttler; Pieter van den Hoogenband	European Swimmer of the Year; 1994; 2003	Succeeded by Denis Pankratov; Pieter van den Hoogenband
Olympic Games
Preceded by Andrey Lavrov	Flagbearer for Russia; Athens 2004	Succeeded by Andrei Kirilenko
