= Francisco Sánchez (swimmer) =

Venezuelan swimmer (born 1976)

Personal information
- Full name: Francisco Demetrio Sánchez Betancourt
- National team: Venezuela
- Born: September 6, 1976 (age 50) Cumaná, Sucre, Venezuela
- Height: 1.90 m (6 ft 3 in)
- Weight: 90 kg (198 lb)

Sport
- Sport: Swimming
- Strokes: Butterfly and Freestyle
- Club: Lázaro Hernández
- College team: Arizona State University (USA) (1995-'99)
Medal record
Men's swimming
Representing Venezuela
World Championships (SC)
Gold medal – first place	1995 Rio de Janeiro	50 m freestyle
Gold medal – first place	1997 Gothenburg	50 m freestyle
Gold medal – first place	1997 Gothenburg	100 m freestyle
Bronze medal – third place	1995 Rio de Janeiro	100 m freestyle
Pan American Games
Gold medal – first place	1999 Winnipeg	100 m butterfly
Bronze medal – third place	1995 Mar del Plata	4×100 m freestyle
Bronze medal – third place	1999 Winnipeg	4×100 m freestyle

Francisco Demetrio Sánchez Betancourt (born September 6, 1976) is a Venezuelan former butterfly and freestyle swimmer.

== Career ==
He won the 50 meter freestyle at the 1995 FINA Short Course World Championships (25 meter pool) in Rio de Janeiro. Two years later, at the third edition of the event, he won the 50 meter and the 100 meter freestyle.

He swam collegiately for the USA's Arizona State University in the late 1990s.

At the 1998 Central American and Caribbean Games, he set a Championship Record in the 100 fly (53.86). This record stood until the 2006 Games where it was bettered by fellow Venezuelan Albert Subirats.
