= Torsten Spanneberg =

German swimmer

Personal information
- Full name: Torsten Spanneberg
- Nationality: Germany
- Born: 13 April 1975 (age 51) Halle an der Saale, East Germany
- Height: 2.02 m (6 ft 8 in)
- Weight: 88 kg (194 lb)

Sport
- Sport: Swimming
- Strokes: Freestyle
- Club: Sportgemeinschaft Neukölln, Berlin
Medal record
Men's swimming
Representing Germany
Olympic Games
Bronze medal – third place	2000 Sydney	4×100 m medley
World Championships (LC)
Silver medal – second place	2001 Fukuoka	4x100 m medley
Bronze medal – third place	2001 Fukuoka	4×100 m freestyle
World Championships (SC)
Silver medal – second place	1995 Rio de Janeiro	4×200 m freestyle
European Championships (LC)
Gold medal – first place	1995 Vienna	4×200 m freestyle
Gold medal – first place	2002 Berlin	4×100 m freestyle
Silver medal – second place	1995 Vienna	100 m freestyle
Silver medal – second place	1995 Vienna	4×100 m freestyle
Silver medal – second place	1997 Seville	4×100 m freestyle
Bronze medal – third place	1995 Vienna	50 m freestyle

Torsten Spanneberg (born 13 April 1975 in Halle, Saxony-Anhalt) is an Olympic medal winning German swimmer. He won the bronze medal in the 4×100 m medley relay at the 2000 Summer Olympics and participated in the swimming at the 2004 Summer Olympics. His trainer is Norbert Warnatzach and his club is S.G. Neukölln. As of 2004, Spanneberg is a student and is 2.02 metres tall and weighs 88 kilograms.
