= Nicholas O'Hare =

Irish swimmer

Personal information
- Born: 27 June 1972 (age 54)

Sport
- Sport: Swimming

Nicholas O'Hare (born 27 June 1972) is an Irish former swimmer. He competed in the men's 50 metre freestyle event at the 1996 Summer Olympics.
