= Brendon Dedekind =

South African swimmer (born 1976)

Personal information
- Born: 14 February 1976 (age 50) Pietermaritzburg, KwaZulu-Natal, South Africa
Medal record
Men's swimming
Representing South Africa
World Championships (SC)
Silver medal – second place	2000 Athens	50 m freestyle
Silver medal – second place	2000 Athens	50 m breaststroke
Pan Pacific Championships
Gold medal – first place	1999 Sydney	50 m freestyle
Commonwealth Games
Silver medal – second place	1998 Kuala Lumpur	50 m freestyle
Universiade
Bronze medal – third place	1997 Catania	50 m freestyle
All-Africa Games
Gold medal – first place	1999 Johannesburg	50 m freestyle
Gold medal – first place	1999 Johannesburg	100 m freestyle
Gold medal – first place	1999 Johannesburg	4×100 m freestyle

Brendon Dedekind (born 14 February 1976 in Pietermaritzburg, KwaZulu-Natal) is a South African retired swimmer. He won an international championship gold medal in the 50 m freestyle at the 1999 Pan Pacific Swimming Championships. Nicknamed Skinny Man, he competed in two consecutive Summer Olympics for his native country, starting in 1996, when he was a finalist in the 50 m freestyle.

== See also ==
- List of Commonwealth Games medallists in swimming (men)
