= Juan Benavides =

Spanish swimmer

Personal information
- Full name: Juan Benavides Hermosilla
- National team: Spain
- Born: 25 June 1975 (age 51) Madrid, Spain

Sport
- Sport: Swimming

Juan Benavides Hermosilla (born 25 June 1975) is a former freestyle swimmer from Spain, who competed at two consecutive Summer Olympics for his native country, starting in 1996. There he finished in 30th and 33rd position in the 50m and 100m Freestyle.
