= Ricardo Busquets =

Puerto Rican swimmer (born 1974)

Personal information
- Full name: Ricardo J. Busquets Healey
- Nickname: "Ricky"
- Nationality: Puerto Rico
- Born: October 3, 1974 (age 51) Ponce, Puerto Rico
- Height: 1.86 m (6 ft 1 in)

Sport
- Sport: Swimming
- Strokes: Freestyle
- College team: University of Tennessee
Medal record
Men's swimming
Representing Puerto Rico
World Championships (LC)
Bronze medal – third place	1998 Perth	50 m freestyle
World Championships (SC)
Bronze medal – third place	1997 Gothenburg	50 m freestyle
Pan Pacific Championships
Gold medal – first place	1997 Fukuoka	50 m freestyle
Bronze medal – third place	1997 Fukuoka	100 m freestyle
Pan American Games
Silver medal – second place	1991 Havana	4×100 m medley
Bronze medal – third place	1991 Havana	4×100 m freestyle
Bronze medal – third place	1991 Havana	4×200 m freestyle

Ricardo J. ("Ricky") Busquets Healy (born October 3, 1974 in Ponce, Puerto Rico) is a former freestyle swimmer from Puerto Rico.

Earned a BA, MS, Pre Health/Sports Medicine from the University of Tennessee, 1992 – 1999.

He is now an orthodontist who works in the Bay Area of California.
