= Attila Zubor =

Hungarian swimmer

Personal information
- Full name: Attila Zubor
- Nationality: Hungary
- Born: 12 March 1975 (age 51) Budapest, Hungary
- Height: 1.91 m (6 ft 3 in)
- Weight: 92 kg (203 lb)

Sport
- Sport: Swimming
- Strokes: Freestyle
- Club: OTP-Sport Plusz Sportegyesület; Sport-Plusz Mahart
Medal record
World Championships (LC)
Bronze medal – third place	1998 Perth	4×100 m medley
European Championships (LC)
Bronze medal – third place	2004 Madrid	4×100 m medley
European Junior Championships (LC)
Gold medal – first place	1992 Leeds	200 m medley

Attila Zubor (born 12 March 1975) is a former freestyle swimmer from Hungary, who competed in three consecutive Summer Olympics for his native country, starting in 1996. He was trained by Tamás Széchy, who coached Tamás Darnyi among others.

== Awards ==
- Hungarian swimmer of the Year (1): 2001
