= Sion Brinn =

Jamaican-British swimmer (born 1973)

Personal information
- Full name: Sion D. Brinn
- National team: Jamaica; Great Britain
- Born: 8 May 1973 (age 53) Kingston, Jamaica
- Height: 1.87 m (6 ft 2 in)
- Weight: 83 kg (183 lb)

Sport
- Sport: Swimming
- Strokes: Freestyle
- College team: Indian River State College; Louisiana State University
Medal record
Men's swimming
Representing Great Britain
FINA World SC Championships
| Bronze medal – third place | 1999 Hong Kong | 4x100 m medley |
European SC Championships
| Silver medal – second place | 1998 Sheffield | 4×50 m freestyle |
| Bronze medal – third place | 1998 Sheffield | 4×50 m medley |

Sion D. Brinn (born 8 May 1973; pronounced "Sean") is a Jamaica-born former competition swimmer.

== Swimming career ==
He represented Jamaica and then Great Britain in international competition. He swam for Jamaica at the 1996 Summer Olympics; and for Great Britain at the 2000 Summer Olympics. He won the 1998 ASA National Championship 100 metres freestyle title.

== Coaching career ==
As of 2016, he is the head coach of the swimming and diving teams at Indian River State College in Fort Pierce, Florida. He was previously the head coach of the swimming and diving team at Wright State University in Dayton, Ohio.

== See also ==
- List of Jamaican records in swimming
