= Oleg Rukhlevich =

Belarusian swimmer (1974–2023)

Personal information
- Born: 2 July 1974 Minsk, USSR
- Died: 17 December 2023 (aged 49)
Medal record
Men's swimming
Representing Belarus
European Championships (LC)
Bronze medal – third place	1997 Seville	100 m freestyle

Aleh Rukhlevich or Oleg Rukhlevich (Belarusian: Алег Рухлевiч, Russian: Олег Рухлевич; 2 July 1974 – 17 December 2023) was a freestyle swimmer from Belarus, who won the bronze medal in the men's 100 m freestyle event at the 1997 European Championships in Seville, Spain. He represented Belarus at two consecutive Summer Olympics, in Atlanta (1996) and Sydney (2000).

Rukhlevich died on 17 December 2023, at the age of 49.
