= Nicolae Ivan (swimmer) =

Romanian swimmer

Personal information
- Nationality: Romania
- Born: January 13, 1975 (age 51) Constanta, Romania
- Height: 1.91 m (6 ft 3 in)

Sport
- Sport: Swimming
- Strokes: Freestyle
Medal record
World Championships (SC)
Bronze medal – third place	1995 Rio de Janeiro	4×100 m freestyle
European Championships (SC)
Bronze medal – third place	1996 Rostock	100 m freestyle

Nicolae Ivan (born January 13, 1975) is a retired freestyle swimmer from Romania, who represented his native country at the 1996 Summer Olympics in Atlanta, Georgia. He is best known for winning the bronze medal in the men's 100 m freestyle at the 1996 European SC Championships in Rostock.
