= Christian Tröger =

German swimmer

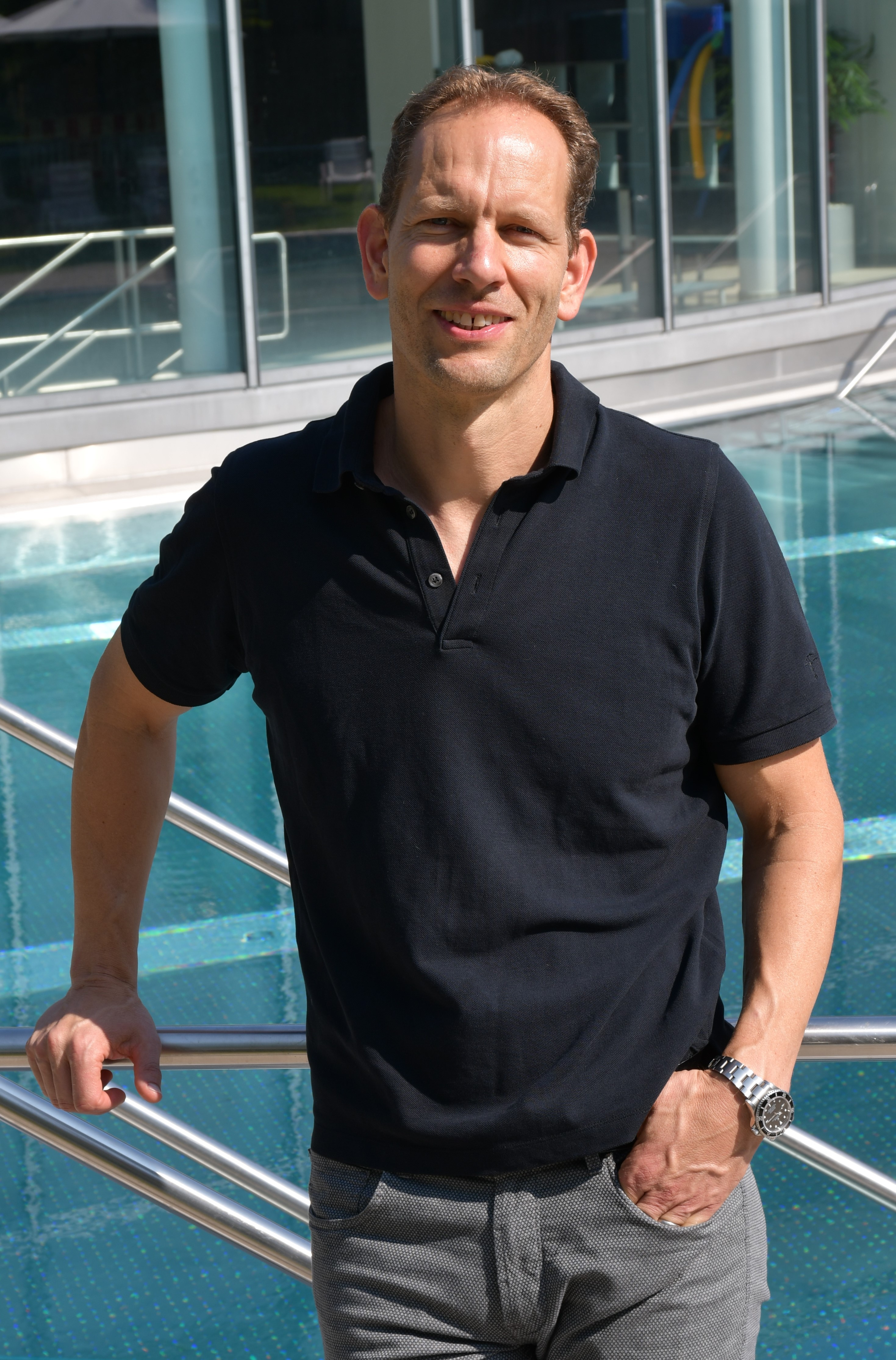
- Christian Tröger in 2021

Personal information
- Full name: Christian-Alexander Tröger
- Nationality: Germany
- Born: 6 October 1969 (age 56) Munich, Bavaria, West Germany
- Height: 1.99 m (6 ft 6 in)
- Weight: 94 kg (207 lb)

Sport
- Sport: Swimming
- Strokes: Freestyle
- Club: 1. Münchener Sportclub
Medal record
Men's swimming
Representing Germany
Olympic Games
Bronze medal – third place	1992 Barcelona	4×100 m freestyle
Bronze medal – third place	1996 Atlanta	4×100 m freestyle
Bronze medal – third place	1996 Atlanta	4×200 m freestyle
World Championships (SC)
Gold medal – first place	1997 Gothenburg	4×100 m freestyle
Silver medal – second place	1993 Palma	4×200 m freestyle
Bronze medal – third place	2000 Athens	4×100 m freestyle
European Championships (LC)
Silver medal – second place	1993 Sheffield	4×200 m freestyle
Silver medal – second place	1995 Vienna	4×100 m freestyle
Silver medal – second place	1997 Seville	4×100 m freestyle
Silver medal – second place	1997 Seville	4×100 m medley
Silver medal – second place	1999 Istanbul	4×100 m medley
Silver medal – second place	2000 Helsinki	4×100 m freestyle
Bronze medal – third place	1993 Sheffield	4×100 m freestyle
Bronze medal – third place	1999 Istanbul	4×100 m freestyle
Universiade
Bronze medal – third place	1997 Catania	100 m freestyle
European Championships (SC)
Gold medal – first place	1996 Rostock	4×50 m freestyle

Christian-Alexander Tröger (born 6 October 1969 in Munich, Bavaria) is a former swimmer from Germany, who won a total number of three bronze medals as a relay member at the Summer Olympics. He first did so in 1992 alongside Mark Pinger, Dirk Richter, and Steffen Zesner.
