= Yoav Bruck =

Israeli swimmer (born 1972)

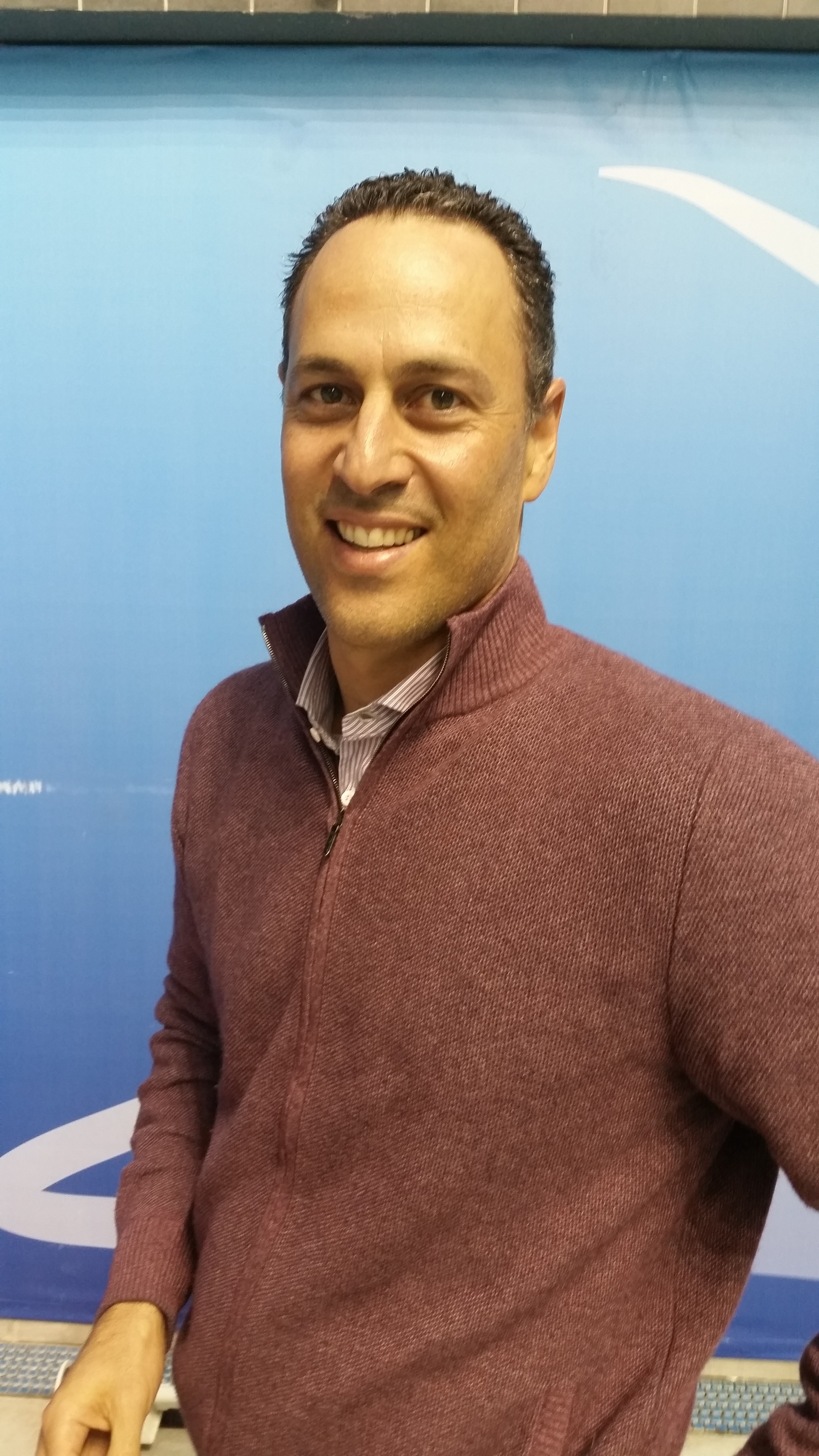

Personal information
- Native name: יואב ברוק
- National team: Israel
- Born: 6 March 1972 (age 54) Moshav Lakhish, Askelon, Hadarom, Israel
- Occupation: Sports Ticketing Executive officer
- Height: 193 cm (6 ft 4 in)
- Weight: 90 kg (198 lb)

Sport
- Sport: Swimming
- Events: 50m, 100m freestyle
- Strokes: Freestyle, 50m, 100m
- Club: Las Vegas Gold
- College team: Auburn University
- Coach: David Marsh

Yoav Bruck (Hebrew: יואב ברוק; born March 6, 1972, in moshav Lakhish, in the northern Negev in south-central Israel) is a former Israeli swimmer, who competed in three Summer Olympics for his native country, in the years 1992, 1996, and 2000. In Olympic competition, Bruck swam the 50m and 100m freestyle events, as well as the 4x100m free and medley relays for Israel. In the 1996 Atlanta Olympics, Bruck's 4x100 Medley Relay team set an Israeli national record in a preliminary heat, and became the first Israeli team to make the finals in that even. He has served as a founder and CEO of Israel's ISTAA Sport, a sports ticketing and travel company.

== Auburn University swimming ==
Bruck swam for the Auburn University Tigers, graduating with the class of 1994 with a Major in Public Relations Communications and Journalism. Members of his class helped win the Tigers' first SEC Swimming and Diving Championships in the Men's division, and affirmed that Coach David Marsh's recruiting and coaching skills had achieved national prominence for Auburn in competitive swimming. By 1998, Auburn hosted the NCAA Swimming and Diving Championships at their James Martin Aquatics Center, though they'd once hosted the tournament previously. Auburn, for the first time, was defending an NCAA championship title. Beginning an exceptional legacy as Auburn's head swimming coach in 1990, by 2007 Marsh would lead the Tigers to seven NCAA national swimming and diving championships. Marsh would also serve as professional adviser of the Israeli Swimming Association.

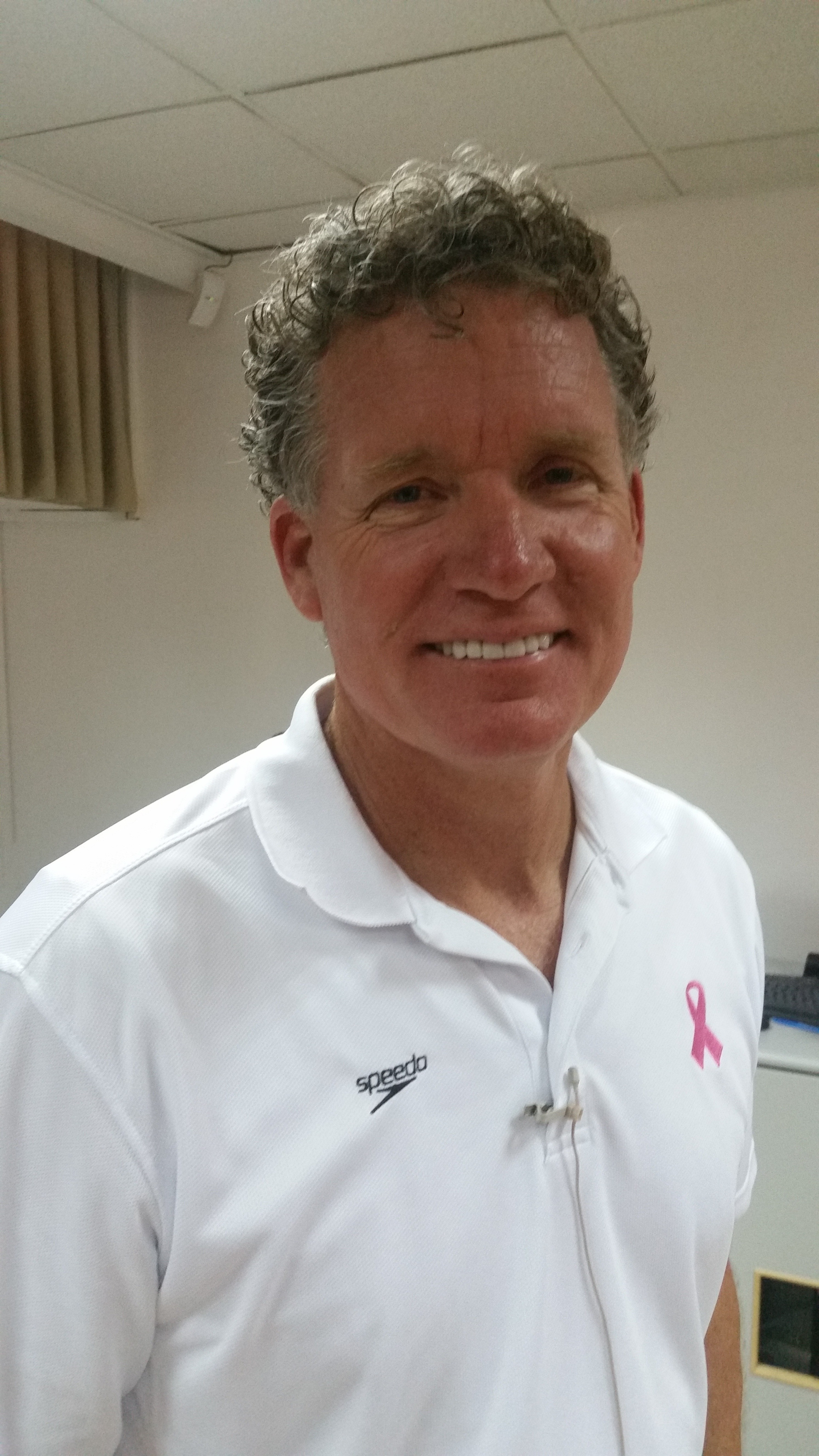
Auburn Swim Coach David Marsh

In an interview, Auburn Coach David Marsh credited Bruck with the team's rise to prominence in the early 90's, stating clearly that "Yoav Bruck was the key". According to Montgomery journalist John Zenor, "Bruck gave Auburn legitimacy in international recruiting. He coaxed and pulled his overachieving teammates along". Bruck won the Auburn Swimmer of the Year award four times.

== International competition ==
On July 2, 1996, in one of his best finishes in world competition, Bruck won a Gold Medal in the 50m free with a time of 22.16 at the FINA Swimming World Cup. He would also win a Gold Medal in the 100m freestyle in World competition and take silver and bronze in the two events.

=== Olympic competition ===
Bruck is Jewish. He finished 32nd in the 50m freestyle (23.72) and 31st in the 100m freestyle (51.46) in the 1992 Summer Olympics in Barcelona. In the 1996 and 2000 Summer Olympics, Bruck competed in the 50m and 100m freestyle, as he had in 1992, but also swam in the 4x100m Medley relay for Israel. In 2000, he swam for Israel in the 4 x 100 freestyle relay for the only time.

The Israeli Team's best relay position was eighth in the 4 x 100 Medley relay in the 1996 Olympics in Atlanta. Bruck swam freestyle, the anchor leg, and the team finished in a time of 3:42.24, a full eight seconds off America's gold medal time. The team was well out of medal contention, but for such a small country to make the finals was significant. The Israeli Team set a national record in the preliminaries, and became the first Israeli team to reach a swimming final. Another team member, Back stroker Eitan Aurbach would also swim for Auburn. Bruck had to postpone his mandatory military service for Israel for four years to find time to train and attend the Olympics, but apparently the Israeli government found his potential worthy of such a consideration.

=== Maccabiah Games ===
At the 1997 Maccabiah Games, he won gold medals in the 50-meter freestyle and 100-meter freestyle.

Bruck married in Israel in March of 1998.

In 2013 Bruck served as the Sports Chairman for the 2013 Maccabiah Games in Israel.

At the 2017 Maccabiah Games, in the special 4x50m relay race between Israeli and American all-star teams, American Olympic champions Lenny Krayzelburg (four Olympic golds), Jason Lezak (four Olympic golds), and Anthony Ervin (three Olympic golds), with masters swimmer Alex Blavatnik, swam a time of 1:48.23 and defeated Israeli Olympians Bruck, Guy Barnea, Eran Groumi, and Tal Stricker, who had a time of 1:51.25.

== ISTAA Sport founder and CEO ==
In 1999, Bruck founded ISTAA Sport of Kfar Shmaryahu, Tel Aviv and has served as their Chief Executive Officer. He is a 1999 graduate of Israel's Recanati Business School of Tel Aviv University, where he obtained an MBA in Marketing, and immediately set out to find a career in the field of Sports ticketing and management. ISTAA Sport is a subsidiary of the established Israeli company, ISTAA Travel, Israel's largest travel agency. ISTAA Sport allows sports enthusiasts to find sporting events and sports activities as part of their travel packages.

== See also ==
- List of select Jewish swimmers
