= France at the 1992 Summer Olympics =

- IOC code: FRA
- NOC: French National Olympic and Sports Committee

in Barcelona
- Competitors: 339 (241 men and 98 women) in 25 sports
- Flag bearer: Jean-François Lamour
- Medals Ranked 9th: Gold 8 Silver 5 Bronze 16 Total 29

Summer Olympics appearances (overview)
- 1896; 1900; 1904; 1908; 1912; 1920; 1924; 1928; 1932; 1936; 1948; 1952; 1956; 1960; 1964; 1968; 1972; 1976; 1980; 1984; 1988; 1992; 1996; 2000; 2004; 2008; 2012; 2016; 2020; 2024

Other related appearances
- 1906 Intercalated Games

France competed at the 1992 Summer Olympics in Barcelona, Spain. 339 competitors, 241 men and 98 women, took part in 196 events in 25 sports.

== Medalists ==
Medal	Name	Sport	Event	Date
Gold	Catherine Fleury	Judo	Women's 61 kg	30 July
Gold	Philippe Omnès	Fencing	Men's foil	31 July
Gold	Éric Srecki	Fencing	Men's épée	1 August
Gold	Franck David	Sailing	Men's Lechner A-390	2 August
Gold	Cécile Nowak	Judo	Women's 48 kg	2 August
Gold	Nicolas Hénard; Yves Loday	Sailing	Tornado	3 August
Gold	Sébastien Flute	Archery	Men's individual	3 August
Gold	Marie-José Pérec	Athletics	Women's 400 metres	5 August
Silver	Jeannie Longo-Ciprelli	Cycling	Women's individual road race	26 July
Silver	Franck Badiou	Shooting	Men's 10 metre air rifle	27 July
Silver	Pascal Tayot	Judo	Men's 86 kg	29 July
Silver	Sylvain Curinier	Canoeing	Men's slalom K-1	2 August
Silver	Jean-Philippe Gatien	Table tennis	Men's singles	6 August
Bronze	Hervé Boussard; Didier Faivre-Pierret; Philippe Gaumont; Jean-Louis Harel	Cycling	Men's team time trial	26 July
Bronze	Nathalie Lupino	Judo	Women's +72 kg	27 July
Bronze	David Douillet	Judo	Men's +95 kg	27 July
Bronze	Stéphan Caron	Swimming	Men's 100 metre freestyle	28 July
Bronze	Laetitia Meignan	Judo	Women's 72 kg	28 July
Bronze	Catherine Plewinski	Swimming	Women's 100 metre butterfly	29 July
Bronze	Franck Esposito	Swimming	Men's 200 metre butterfly	30 July
Bronze	Bertrand Damaisin	Judo	Men's 78 kg	30 July
Bronze	Jacky Avril	Canoeing	Men's slalom C-1	1 August
Bronze	Jean-Michel Henry	Fencing	Men's épée	1 August
Bronze	Franck Adisson; Wilfrid Forgues	Canoeing	Men's slalom C-2	2 August
Bronze	Jean-François Lamour	Fencing	Men's sabre	2 August
Bronze	Hubert Bourdy; Hervé Godignon; Éric Navet; Michel Robert	Equestrian	Team jumping	4 August
Bronze	Jean-Philippe Daurelle; Franck Ducheix; Hervé Granger-Veyron; Pierre Guichot; Jean-François Lamour	Fencing	Men's team sabre	7 August
Bronze	Olivier Boivin; Didier Hoyer	Canoeing	Men's C-2 1000 metres	8 August
Bronze	France men's national handball team: Philippe Debureau; Philippe Gardent; Denis Lathoud; Pascal Mahé; Philippe Médard; Gaël Monthurel; Laurent Munier; Frédéric Perez; Thierry Perreux; Alain Portes; Éric Quintin; Jackson Richardson; Stéphane Stoecklin; Jean-Luc Thiébaut; Denis Tristant; Frédéric Volle	Handball	Men's tournament	8 August

== Competitors ==
The following is the list of number of competitors in the Games.

Sport	Men	Women	Total
Archery	3	3	6
Athletics	38	19	57
Badminton	1	3	4
Boxing	5	–	5
Canoeing	23	8	31
Cycling	14	4	18
Diving	2	0	2
Equestrian	8	4	12
Fencing	15	5	20
Gymnastics	3	8	11
Handball	16	0	16
Judo	7	7	14
Modern pentathlon	3	–	3
Rowing	18	7	25
Sailing	13	4	17
Shooting	10	7	17
Swimming	15	10	25
Synchronized swimming	–	3	3
Table tennis	4	2	6
Tennis	3	4	7
Volleyball	12	0	12
Water polo	13	–	13
Weightlifting	6	–	6
Wrestling	9	–	9
Total	241	98	339

== Archery ==
In France's fifth appearance in modern Olympic archery, the individual archers went 7-3 in head-to-head competition, buoyed by Sebastien Flute's 5-0 record as he advanced to the final and won the gold medal. It was the first medal the French had won in modern Olympic archery. Both teams won the first two rounds before being defeated in the semifinals. They also both lost their bronze medal matches.

Men

Athlete	Event	Ranking round		Round of 32	Round of 16	Quarterfinals	Semifinals	Final / BM	
Athlete	Event	Score	Seed	Opposition Score	Opposition Score	Opposition Score	Opposition Score	Opposition Score	Rank
Bruno Felipe	Individual	1273	31 Q	Shikarev (EUN); L 102–103	Did not advance				
Sébastien Flute	Individual	1301	14 Q	Im (KOR); W 107–102	Han (KOR); W 106–97	Lipponen (FIN); W 109–103	Grov (NOR); W 110–107	Chung (KOR); W 110–107	1st place, gold medalist(s)
Michaël Taupin	Individual	1232	56	Did not advance					
Bruno Felipe; Sébastien Flute; Michaël Taupin	Team	3806	9 Q	—N/a	Italy; W 235–229	South Korea; W 241–240	Finland; L 230–237	Great Britain; L 231–233	4

Women

Athlete	Event	Ranking round		Round of 32	Round of 16	Quarterfinals	Semifinals	Final / BM	
Athlete	Event	Score	Seed	Opposition Score	Opposition Score	Opposition Score	Opposition Score	Opposition Score	Rank
Séverine Bonal	Individual	1321	9 Q	Li (PRK); W 104–96	Lai (TPE); L 108–109	Did not advance			
Christine Gabillard	Individual	1254	41	Did not advance					
Nathalie Hibon	Individual	1285	23 Q	Nowicka (POL); L 100–105	Did not advance				
Séverine Bonal; Christine Gabillard; Nathalie Hibon	Team	3860	5 Q	—N/a	Indonesia; W 236–235	United States; W 234–225	South Korea; L 221–246	Unified Team; L 222–240	4

== Athletics ==
Men
Track and road events

Athlete	Event	Heats		Quarterfinal		Semifinal		Final	
Athlete	Event	Result	Rank	Result	Rank	Result	Rank	Result	Rank
Max Morinière	100 metres	10.36	8 Q	10.34	14 Q	10.42	14	Did not advance	
Daniel Sangouma	100 metres	10.63	28 Q	10.64	30	Did not advance			
Gilles Quénéhervé	200 metres	20.99	17 Q	20.96	24	Did not advance			
Jean-Charles Trouabal	200 metres	DNF		Did not advance					
Frédéric Cornette	800 metres	1:48.22	27	—N/a		Did not advance			
Pascal Thiébaut	5000 metres	13:31.16	6 Q	—N/a				13:43.39	13
Antonio Martins Bordelo	10,000 metres	28:35.13	20 q	—N/a				28:47.66	15
Thierry Pantel	10,000 metres	DNF		—N/a				Did not advance	
Dominique Chauvelier	Marathon	—N/a						2:19:09	31
Luis Soares	Marathon	—N/a						2:21:57	45
Pascal Zilliox	Marathon	—N/a						2:30:02	64
Dan Philibert	110 metres hurdles	13.72	18 q	13.74	13 q	13.77	11	Did not advance	
Sébastien Thibault	110 metres hurdles	13.94	27	Did not advance					
Philippe Tourret	110 metres hurdles	13.91	24 q	14.09	23	Did not advance			
Stéphane Caristan	400 metres hurdles	49.16	11 Q	—N/a		49.50	8 Q	48.86	7
Stéphane Diagana	400 metres hurdles	48.41	2 Q	—N/a		48.28	4 Q	48.13	4
Thierry Brusseau	3000 metres steeplechase	8:33.10	22 Q	—N/a		8:42.48	23	Did not advance	
Joseph Mahmoud	3000 metres steeplechase	8:30.54	17 Q	—N/a		8:52.00	24	Did not advance	
Max Moriniére; Daniel Sangouma; Gilles Quénéhervé; Bruno Marie-Rose	4 × 100 metres relay	39.49	6 Q	—N/a		39.02	9	Did not advance	
Jean-Louis Rapnouil; Yann Quentrec; Stéphane Caristan; Stéphane Diagana	4 × 400 metres relay	3:04.25	11	—N/a				Did not advance	
Thierry Toutain	20 kilometres walk	—N/a						DQ	
Martial Fesselier	50 kilometres walk	—N/a						4:06:31	16
Alain Lemercier	50 kilometres walk	—N/a						4:07:30	17
René Piller	50 kilometres walk	—N/a						4:02:40	15

Field events

Athlete	Event	Qualification		Final	
Athlete	Event	Distance	Position	Distance	Position
Philippe Collet	Pole vault	5.55	12 q	5.55	7
Philippe d'Encausse	Pole vault	5.50	14	Did not advance	
Jean Galfione	Pole vault	5.50	13	Did not advance	
Serge Hélan	Long jump	7.60	31	Did not advance	
Franck Lestage	Long jump	7.72	21	Did not advance	
Pierre Camara	Triple jump	17.34	1 Q	16.52	11
Serge Hélan	Triple jump	16.47	20	Did not advance	
Georges Sainte-Rose	Triple jump	16.50	19	Did not advance	
Christophe Épalle	Hammer throw	76.24	8 Q	74.84	10
Frédéric Kuhn	Hammer throw	71.76	19	Did not advance	
Raphaël Piolanti	Hammer throw	73.22	17	Did not advance	

Combined events – Decathlon

Athlete	Event	100 m	LJ	SP	HJ	400 m	110H	DT	PV	JT	1500 m	Final	Rank
Alain Blondel	Result	11.31	7.31	13.56	2.03	49.19	14.50	37.78	5.10	58.00	4:23.82	8031	15
Alain Blondel	Points	793	888	701	831	852	911	620	941	708	786	8031	15
William Motti	Result	11.42	7.13	15.44	2.12	50.44	15.02	50.58	4.70	67.50	4:48.89	8164	7
William Motti	Points	769	845	817	915	794	847	882	819	851	625	8164	7
Christian Plaziat	Result	10.70	7.21	14.88	1.97	DNF							
Christian Plaziat	Points	929	864	782	776	DNF							

Women
Track and road events

Athlete	Event	Heats		Quarterfinal		Semifinal		Final	
Athlete	Event	Result	Rank	Result	Rank	Result	Rank	Result	Rank
Laurence Bily	100 metres	11.57	19 Q	11.64	22	Did not advance			
Patricia Girard	100 metres	11.51	18 Q	11.54	16 Q	11.70	16	Did not advance	
Odiah Sidibé	100 metres	11.62	22 q	11.63	21	Did not advance			
Valérie Jean-Charles	200 metres	23.69	25 q	23.64	26	Did not advance			
Maguy Nestoret	200 metres	24.15	34	Did not advance					
Elsa Devassoigne	400 metres	52.07	3 Q	51.75	14 Q	52.85	16	Did not advance	
Marie-José Pérec	400 metres	53.64	23 Q	50.89	6 Q	49.48	1 Q	48.83	1st place, gold medalist(s)
Viviane Dorsile	800 metres	2:01.54	19	—N/a		Did not advance			
Marie-Pierre Duros	1500 metres	4:10.14	21 q	—N/a		4:26.61	26	Did not advance	
Marie-Pierre Duros	3000 metres	8:42.32	1 Q	—N/a				DNF	
Zohra Graziani-Koullou	3000 metres	8:55.21	18	—N/a				Did not advance	
Rosario Murcia	10,000 metres	33:16.96	26	—N/a				Did not advance	
Annette Sergent	10,000 metres	32:57.29	23	—N/a				Did not advance	
Maria Rebélo	Marathon	—N/a						DNF	
Cécile Cinélu	100 metres hurdles	13.40	23 Q	13.07	9 q	13.24	12	Did not advance	
Monique Éwanjé-Épée	100 metres hurdles	13.73	30	Did not advance					
Anne Piquereau	100 metres hurdles	13.11	9 Q	13.17	11 Q	13.32	13	Did not advance	
Patricia Girard; Odiah Sidibé; Laurence Bily; Marie-José Pérec	4 × 100 metres relay	42.58	5 Q	—N/a				42.85	4

Field events

Athlete	Event	Qualification		Final	
Athlete	Event	Distance	Position	Distance	Position
Sandrine Fricot	High jump	1.90	21	Did not advance	

Combined event – Heptathlon

Athlete	Event	100H	HJ	SP	200 m	LJ	JT	800 m	Total	Rank
Odile Lesage	Result	13.75	1.88	13.48	25.24	5.99	41.28	2:15.57	6141	15
Odile Lesage	Points	1014	1080	759	865	846	692	885	6141	15
Nathalie Teppe	Result	14.06	1.79	12.69	26.13	5.65	52.58	2:24.42	5847	23
Nathalie Teppe	Points	970	966	707	786	744	910	764	5847	23

== Badminton ==
Men

Athlete	Event	Round of 64	Round of 32	Round of 16	Quarterfinals	Semifinals	Final	
Athlete	Event	Opposition Result	Opposition Result	Opposition Result	Opposition Result	Opposition Result	Opposition Result	Rank
Stéphane Renault	Singles	Mendrek (TCH); L 5–15, 2–15	Did not advance					

Women

Athlete	Event	Round of 64	Round of 32	Round of 16	Quarterfinals	Semifinals	Final	
Athlete	Event	Opposition Result	Opposition Result	Opposition Result	Opposition Result	Opposition Result	Opposition Result	Rank
Virginie Delvingt	Singles	Bąk (POL); L 0–11, 2–11	Did not advance					
Sandra Dimbour	Singles	Robertson (NZL); L 10–12, 9–12	Did not advance					
Christelle Mol	Singles	Muggeridge (GBR); L 5–11, 7–11	Did not advance					
Virginie Delvingt; Christelle Mol	Doubles	—N/a	Gowers / Sankey (GBR); L 7–15, 7–15	Did not advance				

== Boxing ==
Athlete	Event	Round of 32	Round of 16	Quarterfinals	Semifinals	Final	
Athlete	Event	Opposition Result	Opposition Result	Opposition Result	Opposition Result	Opposition Result	Rank
Philippe Wartelle	Bantamweight	Pérez (COL); W 12–5	Jalnaiz (PHI); L RSC R2	Did not advance			
Djamel Lifa	Featherweight	Baleña (PHI); W 20–12	Tews (GER); L 4–9	Did not advance			
Julien Lorcy	Lightweight	Marjouane (MAR); W 11–7	Dobashi (JPN); W RSC R2	Rudolph (GER); L 10–13	Did not advance		
Saïd Ben Najem	Welterweight	Hernández (CUB); L 0–6	Did not advance				
Patrice Aouissi	Light heavyweight	Verde (MEX); W RSC R3	Raforme (SEY); L RSC R2	Did not advance			

== Canoeing ==
=== Slalom ===
Athlete	Event	Run 1	Rank	Run 2	Rank	Best	Rank
Jacky Avril	Men's C-1	117.18	1	135.75	18	117.18	3rd place, bronze medalist(s)
Emmanuel Brugvin	Men's C-1	125.14	9	119.19	5	119.19	7
Thierry Humeau	Men's C-1	127.42	11	124.91	15	124.91	18
Franck Adisson; Wilfrid Forgues	Men's C-2	144.09	10	124.38	3	124.38	3rd place, bronze medalist(s)
Éric Biau; Bertrand Daille	Men's C-2	133.83	6	160.64	15	133.83	11
Thierry Saïdi; Emmanuel del Rey	Men's C-2	132.29	5	137.96	12	132.29	8
Laurent Brissaud	Men's K-1	109.37	2	123.02	24	109.37	5
Sylvain Curinier	Men's K-1	133.09	34	107.06	2	107.06	2nd place, silver medalist(s)
Vincent Fondeviole	Men's K-1	112.69	11	285.19	43	112.69	14
Marianne Agulhon	Women's K-1	140.44	7	132.89	4	132.89	5
Anne Boixel	Women's K-1	203.19	24	140.81	8	140.81	11
Myriam Jerusalmi	Women's K-1	150.86	14	150.76	15	150.76	21

=== Sprint ===
Men

Athlete	Event	Heats		Repechage		Semifinals		Final	
Athlete	Event	Time	Rank	Time	Rank	Time	Rank	Time	Rank
Pascal Sylvoz	C-1 500 metres	1:54.60	4 R	1:55.72	1 SF	1:54.38	4 F	1:55.96	7
Pascal Sylvoz	C-1 1000 metres	4:03.39	2 SF	Bye		4:06.83	1 F	4:09.82	5
Didier Hoyer; Olivier Boivin	C-2 500 metres	1:44.46	3 SF	—N/a		1:42.09	1 F	1:43.04	6
Didier Hoyer; Olivier Boivin	C-2 1000 metres	3:35.82	2 F	—N/a		Bye		3:39.51	3rd place, bronze medalist(s)
Olivier Lasak; Philippe Aubertin	K-2 500 metres	1:49.42	8 R	1:32.51	3 SF	1:33.20	9	Did not advance	
Philippe Boccara; Pascal Boucherit	K-2 1000 metres	3:26.81	5 R	3:18.13	3 SF	3:21.02	5	Did not advance	
Pierre Lubac; Jean-François Briand; Sébastien Mayer; Patrick Lancereau	K-4 1000 metres	3:02.60	5 SF	—N/a		2:58.98	6	Did not advance	

Women

Athlete	Event	Heats		Semifinals		Final	
Athlete	Event	Time	Rank	Time	Rank	Time	Rank
Sabine Goetschy	K-1 500 metres	1:57.68	3 SF	1:51.99	3 F	1:53.53	6
Sabine Goetschy; Bernadette Brégeon	K-2 500 metres	1:45.19	3 SF	1:43.61	6	Did not advance	
Françoise Lasak; Bernadette Brégeon; Isabelle Boulogne; Anne Michaut	K-4 500 metres	1:39.27	5 SF	1:41.83	5	Did not advance	

== Cycling ==
18 cyclists, 14 men and 4 women, represented France in 1992. Jeannie Longo won silver in the women's road race and the men won bronze in the team time trial.

=== Road ===
Men

Athlete	Event	Time	Rank
Sylvain Bolay	Road race	4:35:56	7
Pascal Hervé	Road race	4:35:56	48
Emmanuel Magnien	Road race	DNF	
Hervé Boussard; Didier Faivre-Pierret; Philippe Gaumont; Jean-Louis Harel	Team time trial	2:05:25	3rd place, bronze medalist(s)

Women

Athlete	Event	Time	Rank
Marion Clignet	Road race	2:05:13	33
Jeannie Longo-Ciprelli	Road race	2:05:02	2nd place, silver medalist(s)
Catherine Marsal	Road race	2:05:03	21

=== Track ===
Sprint

Athlete	Event	Qualification		Round 1	Repechage		Round 2	Repechage 2	Quarterfinals	Semifinals	Final	
Athlete	Event	Qualification		Round 1	Round 1	Round 2	Round 2	Repechage 2	Quarterfinals	Semifinals	Final	
Athlete	Event	Time Speed (km/h)	Rank	Opposition Time Speed (km/h)	Opposition Time Speed (km/h)	Opposition Time Speed (km/h)	Opposition Time Speed (km/h)	Opposition Time Speed (km/h)	Opposition Time Speed (km/h)	Opposition Time Speed (km/h)	Opposition Time Speed (km/h)	Rank
Frédéric Magné	Men's sprint	10.617	7	Jeřábek (TCH), Bloch (RSA); W 11.230	Bye		Neiwand (AUS), Chiappa (ITA); L	Carpenter (USA); L	Did not advance			
Félicia Ballanger	Women's sprint	11.508	2	Kuroki (JPN), Paraskevin-Young (USA); W 12.615	Bye	—N/a			Wang (CHN); W, W	Salumäe (EST); L, L	Haringa (NED); L, L	4

Time trial

Athlete	Event	Time	Rank
Frédéric Lancien	Time trial	1:05.157	6

Pursuit

Athlete	Event	Qualification		Quarterfinals	Semifinals	Final	
Athlete	Event	Time	Rank	Opposition Time	Opposition Time	Opposition Time	Rank
Philippe Ermenault	Men's individual pursuit	4:33.892	5 Q	Anderson (NZL); L 4:28.838	Did not advance		
Jeannie Longo-Ciprelli	Women's individual pursuit	3:46.935	6 Q	Twigg (USA); L 3:46.547	Did not advance		
Hervé Dagorné; Philippe Ermenault; Daniel Pandèle; Pascal Potié	Men's individual pursuit	4:23.924	11	Did not advance			

Points race

Athlete	Event	Qualification			Final		
Athlete	Event	Laps	Points	Rank	Laps	Points	Rank
Éric Magnin	Points race	−1 lap	30	3 Q	0 laps	24	6

== Diving ==
Men

Athlete	Event	Qualification		Final	
Athlete	Event	Points	Rank	Points	Rank
Philippe Duvernay	3 m springboard	310.14	29	Did not advance	
Frédéric Pierre	10 m platform	329.01	19	Did not advance	

== Equestrianism ==
=== Dressage ===
Athlete	Horse	Event	Qualification		Final	
Athlete	Horse	Event	Score	Rank	Score	Rank
Serge Cornut	Olifant Charrière	Individual	1444	37	Did not advance	
Dominique d'Esmé	Rapport II	Individual	1427	42	Did not advance	
Catherine Durand	Orphée RBO	Individual	1498	25	Did not advance	
Margit Otto-Crépin	Maritim	Individual	1521	19	Did not advance	
Serge Cornut; Dominique d'Esmé; Catherine Durand; Margit Otto-Crépin	See above	Team	—N/a		4463	9

=== Eventing ===
Athlete	Horse	Event	Dressage		Cross-country			Jumping			Total	
Athlete	Horse	Event	Penalties	Rank	Penalties	Total	Rank	Penalties	Total	Rank	Penalties	Rank
Jean-Jacques Boisson	Oscar de la Loge	Individual	64.80	42	DQ			5.00	335.00	9	335.00	61
Michel Bouquet	Newport AA	Individual	49.80	9	78.40	128.20	39	17.00	145.20	9	145.20	28
Marie-Christine Duroy	Quart du Placineau	Individual	48.20	6	56.40	104.60	30	5.25	109.85	22	109.85	12
Didier Seguret	Coeur de Rocker	Individual	66.20	48	DNF							
Jean-Jacques Boisson; Michel Bouquet; Marie-Christine Duroy; Didier Seguret	See above	Team	162.80	3	400.00	562.80	15	27.25	590.05	8	590.05	14

=== Jumping ===
Athlete	Horse	Event	Qualification								Final					
Athlete	Horse	Event	Round 1		Round 2		Round 3		Total		Round 1		Round 2		Total	
Athlete	Horse	Event	Score	Rank	Score	Rank	Score	Rank	Score	Rank	Penalties	Rank	Penalties	Rank	Penalties	Rank
Hubert Bourdy	Razzia du Poncel	Individual	56.00	29	72.50	8	86.00	2	214.50	4 Q	DNF		Did not advance			
Hervé Godignon	Quidam de Revel	Individual	62.00	26	84.50	1	DNF		146.50	35 Q	1.00	5 Q	5.25	5	6.25	4
Éric Navet	Quito de Baussy	Individual	70.50	13	39.50	47	72.00	16	182.00	12 Q	8.00	14 Q	8.50	8	16.50	11
Michel Robert	Nonix	Individual	82.50	1	19.00	69	78.00	9	179.50	14	Did not compete					
Hubert Bourdy; Hervé Godignon; Éric Navet; Michel Robert	See above	Team	—N/a								8.75	3	16.00	6	24.75	3rd place, bronze medalist(s)

== Fencing ==
20 fencers, 15 men and 5 women represented France in 1992.

Individual
Pool stage

Athlete	Event	Group Stage						
Athlete	Event	Opposition Result	Opposition Result	Opposition Result	Opposition Result	Opposition Result	Opposition Result	Rank
Patrick Groc	Men's foil	Holubytskiy (EUN); L 2–5	Yu (KOR); W 5–1	Kajbjer (SWE); W 5–4	González (ARG); W 5–0	Gosbee (GBR); L 3–5	—N/a	22 Q
Patrice Lhôtellier	Men's foil	Betancourt (CUB); L 3–5	Abe (JPN); W 5–1	Lo (HKG); W 5–0	Giasson (CAN); W 5–4	El-Khoury (LBN); L 1–5	—N/a	23 Q
Philippe Omnès	Men's foil	Cerioni (ITA); L 1–5	Ichigatani (JPN); W 5–0	Busa (HUN); W 5–2	García (ESP); W 5–2	van Garderen (RSA); W 5–1	Youssef (LBN); W 5–1	4 Q
Jean-Michel Henry	Men's épée	Chouinard (CAN); W 5–3	Kuhn (SUI); W 5–2	Sandegren (SWE); W 5–3	Nawrocki (POL); W 5–1	van Garderen (RSA); W 5–1	Kim (KOR); L 3–5	7 Q
Olivier Lenglet	Men's épée	Borrmann (GER); L 2–5	Lee (KOR); W 5–4	Arnold (AUS); W 5–1	El-Khoury (LBN); W 5–2	Strydom (RSA); W 5–0	Ječmínek (TCH); L 3–5	13 Q
Éric Srecki	Men's épée	Kravchuk (EUN); L 5–5	Lazzarini (BRA); W 5–0	Douba (TCH); W 5–2	Paul (GBR); W 5–3	O'Loughlin (USA); W 5–1	Zakaria (INA); W 5–2	5 Q
Jean-Philippe Daurelle	Men's sabre	Szabó (HUN); L 2–5	Chiculiţă (ROU); W 5–4	Zavieh (GBR); W 5–0	Jia (CHN); W 5–3	—N/a		11 Q
Franck Ducheix	Men's sabre	Scalzo (ITA); L 4–5	Pogosov (EUN); W 5–2	Lofton (USA); W 5–2	Plourde (CAN); W 5–4	van Garderen (RSA); W 5–2	Babanasis (GRE); L 3–5	13 Q
Jean-François Lamour	Men's sabre	Kempenich (GER); W 5–3	Kościelniakowski (POL); W 5–4	Williams (GBR); W 5–2	Al-Baker (KSA); W 5–2	Grigore (ROU); L 4–5	—N/a	5 Q
Gisèle Meygret	Women's foil	Zalaffi (ITA); L 4–5	Maciejewska (POL); L 0–5	Lee (KOR); L 2–5	Tremblay (CAN); W 5–2	Takayanagi (JPN); W 5–3	Botha (RSA); W 5–1	28 Q
Laurence Modaine	Women's foil	Jánosi-Németh (HUN); L 3–5	Tufan (ROU); L 1–5	Sobczak (POL); L 2–5	Bilodeaux-Banos (USA); W 5–2	Bracewell (GBR); W 5–1	Iannuzzi (ARG); W 5–0	27 Q
Isabelle Spennato	Women's foil	Sadovskaya (EUN); W 5–2	Bortolozzi (ITA); L 2–5	Nasson (RSA); W 5–1	Shin (KOR); W 5–1	Chiuchich (ARG); W 5–1	Savić (IOA); L 3–5	12 Q

Elimination phase

Athlete	Event	Round 1	Round 2	Round 3	Round 4	Repechage				Quarterfinals	Semifinals	Final	
Athlete	Event	Round 1	Round 2	Round 3	Round 4	Round 1	Round 2	Round 3	Round 4	Quarterfinals	Semifinals	Final	
Athlete	Event	Opposition Result	Opposition Result	Opposition Result	Opposition Result	Opposition Result	Opposition Result	Opposition Result	Opposition Result	Opposition Result	Opposition Result	Opposition Result	Rank
Patrick Groc	Men's foil	Krzesiński (POL); W 2–0	Wendt (AUT); L 1–2	—N/a		Bravo (ESP); W 2–1	Kiełpikowski (POL); L 1–2	Did not advance					
Patrice Lhôtellier	Men's foil	McKenzie (GBR); L 0–2	Did not advance										
Philippe Omnès	Men's foil	Bye	Ludwig (AUT); W 2–0	Grigoryev (EUN); W 2–0	Borella (ITA); L 1–2	Bye			Richter (AUT); W 2–0	Wendt (AUT); W 2–0	Wagner (GER); W 2–1	Holubytskiy (EUN); W 2–1	1st place, gold medalist(s)
Jean-Michel Henry	Men's épée	Bye	Lundblad (SWE); W 2–0	Felisiak (GER); L 1–2	—N/a	Bye	Chouinard (CAN); W 2–0	Kulcsár (HUN); W 2–1	Vánky (SWE); W 2–0	Borrmann (GER); W 2–1	Kolobkov (EUN); L 1–2	Kaaberma (EST); W 2–1	3rd place, bronze medalist(s)
Olivier Lenglet	Men's épée	Milan (ROU); W 2–0	Jacquet (SUI); W 2–0	Rivas (COL); L 1–2	—N/a	Bye	Kravchuk (EUN); L 1–2	Did not advance					
Éric Srecki	Men's épée	Bye	Schmitt (GER) 'W 2–0	Shong (CAN); W 2–0	Kaaberma (EST); L 1–2	Bye			Shuvalov (EUN); W 2–0	Kovács (HUN); W 2–1	Kaaberma (EST); W 2–0	Kolobkov (EUN); W 2–0	1st place, gold medalist(s)
Jean-Philippe Daurelle	Men's sabre	Bye	Gniewkowski (POL); L 0–2	—N/a		Zavieh (GBR); W 2–0	Banos (CAN); W 2–0	Shirshov (EUN); W 2–1	Nolte (GER); L 0–2	Did not advance			
Franck Ducheix	Men's sabre	Bye	Banos (CAN); W 2–0	Scalzo (ITA); L 1–2	—N/a	Bye	Zheng (CHN); L 1–2	Did not advance					
Jean-François Lamour	Men's sabre	Bye	Yang (CHN); W 2–0	Marin (ITA); W 2–0	Kiriyenko (EUN); W 2–1	Bye				Kościelniakowski (POL); W 2–0	Marin (ITA); L 0–2	Scalzo (ITA); L 1–2	4
Gisèle Meygret	Women's foil	Dobmeier (GER); W 2–1	Sin (KOR); L 1–2	—N/a		E (CHN); W 2–1	Jánosi-Németh (HUN); L 0–2	Did not advance					
Laurence Modaine	Women's foil	Bye	Glikina (EUN); W 2–0	Tufan (ROU); W 2–1	Bau (GER); L 1–2	Bye			Jánosi-Németh (HUN); W 2–0	Zalaffi (ITA); W 2–0	Wang (CHN); L 1–2	Sadovskaya (EUN); L 1–2	4
Isabelle Spennato	Women's foil	Bye	Xiao (CHN); L 0–2	—N/a		Savić (IOA); W 2–0	Sobczak (POL); L 0–2	Did not advance					

Team

Athlete	Event	Group Stage			Quarterfinals	Semifinals	Final	
Athlete	Event	Opposition Result	Opposition Result	Rank	Opposition Result	Opposition Result	Opposition Result	Rank
Patrick Groc; Youssef Hocine; Olivier Lambert; Patrice Lhôtellier; Philippe Omnès	Men's foil	Unified Team; L 6–8	Spain; W 9–4	2 Q	Germany; L 5–9	Italy; L 6–9	South Korea; W 9–2	7
Jean-François Di Martino; Jean-Michel Henry; Olivier Lenglet; Robert Leroux; Éric Srecki	Men's épée	Sweden; W 9–7	South Korea; W 9–5	1 Q	Spain; W 8–2	Hungary; L 3–9	Unified Team; L 8–8	4
Jean-Philippe Daurelle; Franck Ducheix; Hervé Granger-Veyron; Pierre Guichot; Jean-François Lamour	Men's sabre	Romania; W 9–7	United States; W 9–5	1 Q	China; W 9–5	Hungary; L 1–9	Romania; W 9–4	3rd place, bronze medalist(s)
Patrick Groc; Youssef Hocine; Olivier Lambert; Patrice Lhôtellier; Philippe Omnès	Women's foil	China; L 6–8	United States; W 9–5	2 Q	Germany; L 8–8	Poland; W 9–3	China; W 9–5	5

== Gymnastics ==
=== Artistic ===
==== Men ====
Qualification

Athlete	Event	Qualification							
Athlete	Event	Apparatus						Total	Rank
Athlete	Event	F	PH	R	V	PB	HB	Total	Rank
Patrice Casimir	Individual	18.800	18.925	18.925	18.925	19.100	19.075	113.750	42 q
Sébastien Darrigade	Individual	18.875	18.450	19.000	18.925	18.900	19.175	113.325	47 q
Fabrice Guelzec	Individual	18.875	18.350	18.950	18.700	18.675	19.050	112.600	63

Individual finals

Athlete	Event	Qualification							
Athlete	Event	Apparatus						Total	Rank
Athlete	Event	F	PH	R	V	PB	HB	Total	Rank
Patrice Casimir	Individual	9.475	9.575	8.675	9.650	9.475	9.575	56.425	31
Sébastien Darrigade	Individual	9.600	9.450	9.425	9.150	9.250	9.500	56.375	32

==== Women ====
Team

Athlete	Event	Qualification					
Athlete	Event	Apparatus				Total	Rank
Athlete	Event	V	UB	BB	F	Total	Rank
Karine Boucher	Team	19.537	18.574	19.212	19.250	76.573	63
Carine Charlier	Team	19.312	18.924	18.800	19.112	76.148	71
Marie-Angéline Colson	Team	19.637	19.437	19.137	19.450	77.661	36 Q
Virginie Machado	Team	19.437	19.587	19.262	19.325	77.611	38 q
Chloé Maigre	Team	19.399	19.662	18.924	19.299	77.284	43 q
Jenny Rolland	Team	19.187	18.787	18.399	19.049	75.422	84
Total	Team	97.322	96.522	95.635	96.573	386.052	8

Individual finals

Athlete	Event	Apparatus				Total	Rank
Athlete	Event	V	UB	BB	F	Total	Rank
Marie-Angéline Colson	All-around	8.962	9.225	9.800	9.787	37.774	35
Virginie Machado	All-around	9.650	9.750	9.687	9.737	38.824	26
Chloé Maigre	All-around	9.662	9.125	9.775	9.712	38.274	32

=== Rhythmic ===
Athlete	Event	Qualification						Final						
Athlete	Event	Hoop	Rope	Clubs	Ball	Total	Rank	Qualification	Hoop	Rope	Clubs	Ball	Total	Rank
Céline Degrange	Individual	8.975	9.000	8.925	9.050	35.950	25	Did not advance						
Chrystelle-Arlette Sahuc	Individual	9.050	9.150	9.100	9.075	36.375	19	Did not advance						

== Handball ==
Summary

Key:

- ET: After extra time
- P – Match decided by penalty-shootout.

Team	Event	Group stage						Semifinal	Final / BM	
Team	Event	Opposition Score	Opposition Score	Opposition Score	Opposition Score	Opposition Score	Rank	Opposition Score	Opposition Score	Rank
France men's	Men's tournament	Spain; W 18–16	Unified Team; L 22–23	Germany; W 23–20	Romania; W 26–20	Egypt; W 22–19	2 Q	Sweden; L 22–25	Iceland; W 24–20	3rd place, bronze medalist(s)

=== Men's tournament ===
Team roster

- Philippe Debureau
- Philippe Gardent
- Denis Lathoud
- Pascal Mahé
- Philippe Médard
- Gaël Monthurel
- Laurent Munier
- Frédéric Perez
- Alain Portes
- Thierry Perreux
- Éric Quintin
- Jackson Richardson
- Stéphane Stoecklin
- Jean-Luc Thiébaut
- Denis Tristant
- Frédéric Volle

Head coach

- Daniel Costantini

Group play

Pos	Team	Pld	W	D	L	GF	GA	GD	Pts	Qualification
1	Unified Team	5	5	0	0	121	98	+23	10	Semifinals
2	France	5	4	0	1	111	98	+13	8	Semifinals
3	Spain (H)	5	3	0	2	97	98	−1	6	Fifth place game
4	Romania	5	1	1	3	107	115	−8	3 (Note: 25% rule: Romania –9 GD; Germany –14 GD)	Seventh place game
5	Germany	5	1	1	3	97	103	−6	3	Ninth place game
6	Egypt	5	0	0	5	92	113	−21	0	Eleventh place game

(H) Hosts
Notes:

27 July 1992; 20:30	Spain	16–18	France	Palau d'Esports de Granollers, Granollers; Referees: Szajna, Wróblewski (POL)
27 July 1992; 20:30	Masip 5	(7–7)	Volle 4	Palau d'Esports de Granollers, Granollers; Referees: Szajna, Wróblewski (POL)

29 July 1992; 11:30	France	22–23	Unified Team	Palau d'Esports de Granollers, Granollers; Referees: Rudin, Schill (SUI)
29 July 1992; 11:30	Munier, Portes 4	(12–14)	Dujshebaev 9	Palau d'Esports de Granollers, Granollers; Referees: Rudin, Schill (SUI)

31 July 1992; 16:00	Germany	20–23	France	Palau d'Esports de Granollers, Granollers; Referees: Johansson, Kjellkvist (SWE)
31 July 1992; 16:00	three players 4	(9–10)	Lathoud, Munier 5	Palau d'Esports de Granollers, Granollers; Referees: Johansson, Kjellkvist (SWE)

2 August 1992; 11:30	Romania	20–26	France	Palau d'Esports de Granollers, Granollers; Referees: Øie, Høgsnes (NOR)
2 August 1992; 11:30	Licu, Zaharia 7	(11–12)	Lathoud 6	Palau d'Esports de Granollers, Granollers; Referees: Øie, Høgsnes (NOR)

4 August 1992; 10:00	France	22–19	Egypt	Palau d'Esports de Granollers, Granollers; Referees: Jug, Jeglič (SLO)
4 August 1992; 10:00	Munier 8	(10–7)	Debes, Mohamed 4	Palau d'Esports de Granollers, Granollers; Referees: Jug, Jeglič (SLO)

Semifinal

6 August 1992; 19:00	Sweden	25–22	France	Palau d'Esports de Granollers, Granollers; Referees: Szajna, Wróblewski (POL)
6 August 1992; 19:00	Thorsson 6	(11–10)	Lathoud 6	Palau d'Esports de Granollers, Granollers; Referees: Szajna, Wróblewski (POL)

Bronze medal match

8 August 1992; 15:00	Iceland	20–24	France	Palau Sant Jordi, Barcelona; Referees: Guterman (LTU), Taranukhin (RUS)
8 August 1992; 15:00	Grímsson 5	(9–12)	Munier 6	Palau Sant Jordi, Barcelona; Referees: Guterman (LTU), Taranukhin (RUS)

== Judo ==
Men

Athlete	Event	Round of 64	Round of 32	Round of 16	Quarterfinals	Semifinals	Repechage				Final	
Athlete	Event	Round of 64	Round of 32	Round of 16	Quarterfinals	Semifinals	Round 1	Round 2	Round 3	Round 4	Final	
Athlete	Event	Opposition Result	Opposition Result	Opposition Result	Opposition Result	Opposition Result	Opposition Result	Opposition Result	Opposition Result	Opposition Result	Opposition Result	Rank
Philippe Pradayrol	60 kg	Okada (USA); W Yusei-gachi	Al-Humaidi (YEM); W Ippon	Efemgil (TUR); W Chui	Trautmann (GER); L Ippon	Did not advance	—N/a		Beaton (CAN); W Ippon	Garcia (VEN); W Ippon	Koshino (JPN); L Ippon	5
Benoît Campargue	65 kg	Born (SUI); W Waza-ari	Maruyama (JPN); L Ippon	Did not advance								
Bruno Carabetta	71 kg	Bye	Ayan (TUR); W Ippon	Dott (GER); L Yusei-gachi	Did not advance		—N/a	Mafuta (ZAI); W Ippon	Korhonen (FIN); W Ippon	Błach (POL); W Waza-ari	Chung (KOR); L Yusei-gachi	5
Bertrand Damaisin	78 kg	Bye	Schaffter (SUI); W Keikoku	Summer (AUT); W Ippon	Laats (BEL); L Ippon	Did not advance	—N/a		Zsoldos (HUN); W Ippon	Ciupe (ROU); W Chui	Adolfsson (SWE); W Waza-ari	3rd place, bronze medalist(s)
Pascal Tayot	86 kg	—N/a	Korbel (HUN); W Koka	Croitoru (ROU); W Shido	Franco (CUB); W Koka	Lobenstein (GER); W Ippon	—N/a				Legień (POL); L Yuko	2nd place, silver medalist(s)
Stéphane Traineau	95 kg	Pie (INA); W Ippon	Friðriksson (ISL); W Ippon	White (USA); L Ippon	Did not advance							
David Douillet	+95 kg	—N/a	Gordon (GBR); W Ippon	Stöhr (GER); W Hansoku-make	Pérez (ESP); W Ippon	Ogawa (JPN); L Ippon	—N/a				Moreno (CUB); W Yuko	3rd place, bronze medalist(s)

Women

Athlete	Event	Round of 32	Round of 16	Quarterfinals	Semifinals	Repechage			Final	
Athlete	Event	Round of 32	Round of 16	Quarterfinals	Semifinals	Round 1	Round 2	Round 3	Final	
Athlete	Event	Opposition Result	Opposition Result	Opposition Result	Opposition Result	Opposition Result	Opposition Result	Opposition Result	Opposition Result	Rank
Cécile Nowak	48 kg	Bye	Şenyurt (TUR); W Ippon	Tortora (ITA); W Kiken-gachi	Souakri (ALG); W Ippon	—N/a			Tamura (JPN); W Koka	1st place, gold medalist(s)
Dominique Berna	52 kg	Parragh (HUN); W Koka	Mariani (ARG); L Koka	Did not advance						
Catherine Arnaud	56 kg	Mainville (CAN); W Ippon	Law (HKG); W Ippon	Fairbrother (GBR); L Ippon	Did not advance	—N/a	Eck (AUT); W Yusei-gachi	González (CUB); L Koka	Did not advance	
Catherine Fleury	61 kg	Warren-Jeans (ZIM); W Ippon	Beltrán (CUB); W Shido	Griffith (VEN); W Ippon	Gu (KOR); W Ippon	—N/a			Arad (ISR); W Yusei-gachi	1st place, gold medalist(s)
Claire Lecat	66 kg	del Carmen Bellón (ESP); W Yuko	Laveti (FIJ); W Hansoku-make	Pierantozzi (ITA); L Koka	Did not advance	—N/a	Han (NED); W Shido	Martinel (ARG); W Ippon	Howey (GBR); L Waza-ari	5
Laetitia Meignan	72 kg	de Kok (NED); L Yusei-gachi	Did not advance			Richter (ROU); W Ippon	Werbrouck (BEL); W Ippon	Håkansson (SWE); W Yuko	Horton (GBR); W Ippon	3rd place, bronze medalist(s)
Nathalie Lupino	+72 kg	Santini (PUR); W Ippon	Patterson (CAN); W Ippon	Gundarenko (EUN); W Ippon	Rodríguez (CUB); L Yuko	—N/a			Weber (GER); W Ippon	3rd place, bronze medalist(s)

== Modern pentathlon ==
Three male pentathletes represented France in 1992.

Athlete	Event	Fencing (épée one touch)			Swimming (300 m freestyle)			Shooting (Air pistol)			Riding (show jumping)			Running (4000 m)			Total points	Final rank
Athlete	Event	Results	Rank	MP points	Time	Rank	MP points	Points	Rank	MP Points	Penalties	Rank	MP points	Time	Rank	MP Points	Total points	Final rank
Joël Bouzou	Individual	36–29	18	830	3:34.5	54	1156	186	24	1060	62	18	1038	13:31.3	28	1132	5216	17
Sébastien Deleigne	Individual	33–32	37	779	3:25.5	35	1228	184	33	1030	60	16	1040	13:17.7	16	1174	5251	11
Christophe Ruer	Individual	33–32	37	779	3:14.0	3	1320	184	33	1030	495	61	605	12:55.7	4	1240	4974	41
Joël Bouzou; Sébastien Deleigne; Christophe Ruer	Team	102–93	11	2388	10:14.0	6	3704	554	8	3120	617	11	2683	39:44.7	3	3546	15441	7

== Rowing ==
Men

Athlete	Event	Heats		Repechage		Semifinals		Final	
Athlete	Event	Time	Rank	Time	Rank	Time	Rank	Time	Rank
Fiorenzo Di Giovanni; Fabrice LeClerc; Yves Lamarque; Samuel Barathay	Quadruple sculls	5:47.80	1 SF	Bye		5:48.72	3 FA	5:54.80	6
Michel Andrieux; Jean-Christophe Rolland	Coxless pair	6:39.95	2 R	6:43.83	1 SF	6:33.88	1 FA	6:36.34	4
Patrick Berthou; Laurent Lacasa; Emmanuel Bunoz	Coxed pair	7:03.77	2 SF	Bye		6:53.96	3 FA	7:03.01	6
Jean-Pierre Le Lain; Patrick Vibert-Vichet; Bruno Dumay; Dominique Lecointe	Coxless four	6:15.23	4 R	6:13.37	3 SF	6:12.57	6 FB	6:17.69	12
Yannick Schulte; Philippe Lot; Daniel Fauché; Jean-Paul Vergne; Jean-Pierre Huguet-Balent	Coxed four	6:26.51	4 R	6:18.77	2 FA	—N/a		6:06.82	5

Women

Athlete	Event	Heats		Repechage		Semifinals		Final	
Athlete	Event	Time	Rank	Time	Rank	Time	Rank	Time	Rank
Corinne Le Moal	Single sculls	7:50.96	2 SF	Bye		7:39.78	3 FA	7:41.85	6
Christine Gossé; Isabelle Danjou	Coxless pair	7:43.29	1 SF	Bye		7:12.35	2 FA	7:08.70	4
Frédérique Heligon; Chantal Lafon; Christine Jullien; Hélène Cortin	Coxless four	6:50.95	2 R	6:50.23	3 FB	—N/a		6:45.16	7

== Sailing ==
Men

Athlete	Event	Race										Net points	Final rank
Athlete	Event	1	2	3	4	5	6	7	8	9	10	Net points	Final rank
Franck David	Lechner A-390	14	5.7	18	0	8	8	3	14	~~23~~	0	70.7	1st place, gold medalist(s)
Xavier Rohart	Finn	10	10	19	8	10	18	~~19~~	—N/a			75	7
Dimitri Deruelle; Maxime Paul	470	25	19	28	31	~~32~~	30	15	—N/a			148	25

Women

Athlete	Event	Race										Net points	Final rank
Athlete	Event	1	2	3	4	5	6	7	8	9	10	Net points	Final rank
Maud Herbert	Lechner A-390	15	0	10	10	18	0	10	15	0	~~31~~	78	4
Annabel Chaulvin	Europe	~~23~~	19	22	16	23	15	5.7	—N/a			100.7	13
Florence Lebrun; Odile Barre	470	0	17	15	5.7	15	13	~~18~~	—N/a			65.7	6

Open
Fleet racing

Athlete	Event	Race							Net points	Final rank
Athlete	Event	1	2	3	4	5	6	7	Net points	Final rank
Thierry Berger; Vincent Berger	Flying Dutchman	8	15	21	~~30~~	25	18	10	97	10
Nicolas Hénard; Yves Loday	Tornado	13	0	5.7	5.7	~~16~~	13	3	40.4	1st place, gold medalist(s)
Patrick Haegeli; Yannick Adde	Star	15	21	19	20	19	~~28~~	22	116	18

Athlete	Event	Qualification races						Total	Rank
Athlete	Event	1	2	3	4	5	6	Total	Rank
Alain Pointet; Fabrice Levet; Marc Bouet	Soling	18	17	20	20	21	13	88	15

== Shooting ==
Men

Athlete	Event	Qualification		Final	
Athlete	Event	Points	Rank	Points	Rank
Jean-Pierre Amat	10 metre air rifle	590	7 Q	691.6	4
Jean-Pierre Amat	50 metre rifle three positions	1159	16	Did not advance	
Jean-Pierre Amat	50 metre rifle prone	592	26	Did not advance	
Franck Badiou	10 metre air rifle	591	3 Q	691.9	2nd place, silver medalist(s)
Michel Bury	50 metre rifle three positions	1155	21	Did not advance	
Michel Bury	50 metre rifle prone	597	6 Q	700.0	5
Philippe Cola	10 metre air pistol	579	11	Did not advance	
Philippe Cola	50 metre pistol	552	22	Did not advance	
Franck Dumoulin	10 metre air pistol	575	22	Did not advance	
Franck Dumoulin	50 metre pistol	544	36	Did not advance	
Christian Kezel	25 metre rapid fire pistol	582	16	Did not advance	
Jean-Luc Tricoire	10 metre running target	512	24	Did not advance	

Women

Athlete	Event	Qualification		Final	
Athlete	Event	Points	Rank	Points	Rank
Christine Bontemps	10 metre air rifle	389	17	Did not advance	
Dominique Esnault	50 metre rifle three positions	567	30	Did not advance	
Isabelle Héberlé	50 metre rifle three positions	566	32	Did not advance	
Evelyne Manchon	10 metre air pistol	375	24	Did not advance	
Evelyne Manchon	25 metre pistol	577	9	Did not advance	
Annette Sattel	10 metre air rifle	384	34	Did not advance	
Corinne Serra Tosio	10 metre air pistol	376	21	Did not advance	
Corinne Serra Tosio	25 metre pistol	568	33	Did not advance	

Open

Athlete	Event	Qualification		Final	
Athlete	Event	Points	Rank	Points	Rank
Claude Cuy y Mola	Skeet	143	42	Did not advance	
Stéphane Tyssier	Skeet	144	33	Did not advance	
Muriel Bernard	Trap	188	21	Did not advance	
Jean-Paul Gros	Trap	191	16	Did not advance	

== Swimming ==
Men

Athlete	Event	Heats		Final A/B	
Athlete	Event	Time	Rank	Time	Rank
Christophe Bordeau	200 metre butterfly	2:01.99	25	Did not advance	
Christophe Bourdon	100 metre breaststroke	1:04.43	37	Did not advance	
Christophe Bourdon	200 metre breaststroke	2:17.68	21	Did not advance	
Stéphane Caron	50 metre freestyle	23.01	13 FB	Withdrew	
Stéphane Caron	100 metre freestyle	49.82	5 FA	49.50	3rd place, bronze medalist(s)
Yann de Fabrique	400 metre freestyle	3:55.66	17 FB	3:54.37	14
Franck Esposito	100 metre butterfly	55.26	22	Did not advance	
Franck Esposito	200 metre butterfly	1:58.75	3 FA	1:58.51	3rd place, bronze medalist(s)
Bruno Gutzeit	100 metre butterfly	54.35	9 FB	54.80	11
David Holderbach	100 metre backstroke	58.25	36	Did not advance	
David Holderbach	200 metre backstroke	2:03.11	22	Did not advance	
Christophe Kalfayan	50 metre freestyle	22.70	6 FA	22.50	4
Christophe Kalfayan	100 metre freestyle	50.30	12 FB	50.49	11
Frédéric Lefèvre	200 metre individual medley	2:03.82	13 FB	2:04.05	12
Christophe Marchand	400 metre freestyle	3:54.59	14 FB	3:53.24	13
Christophe Marchand	1500 metre freestyle	15:30.51	14	Did not advance	
Franck Schott	100 metre backstroke	55.84	6 FA	55.72	6
Stéphane Vossart	100 metre breaststroke	1:02.81	13 FB	1:02.39	10
Stéphane Vossart	200 metre breaststroke	2:15.11	11 FB	2:15.52	10
Christophe Kalfayan; Franck Schott; Frédéric Lefèvre; Stéphan Caron; Ludovic Dépickère (*); Bruno Gutzeit (*)	4 × 100 metre freestyle relay	3:22.01	7 FA	3:19.16	4
Christophe Bordeau; Lionel Poirot; Franck Horter; Yann de Fabrique	4 × 200 metre freestyle relay	7:26.22	10	Did not advance	
Franck Schott; Stéphane Vossart; Bruno Gutzeit; Stéphane Caron; Franck Esposito (*); Christophe Kalfayan (*)	4 × 100 metre medley relay	3:43.13	5 FA	3:40.51	5

Women

Athlete	Event	Heats		Final A/B	
Athlete	Event	Time	Rank	Time	Rank
Julie Blaise	50 metre freestyle	26.48	17	Did not advance	
Céline Bonnet	100 metre backstroke	1:05.75	32	Did not advance	
Céline Bonnet	200 metre individual medley	2:18.95	18 FB	2:19.14	14
Céline Bonnet	400 metre individual medley	4:54.70	19	Did not advance	
Jacqueline Delord	100 metre butterfly	1:01.78	16 FB	1:03.22	16
Audrey Guérit	100 metre breaststroke	1:13.98	30	Did not advance	
Audrey Guérit	200 metre breaststroke	2:32.33	13 FB	2:32.10	11
Cécile Jeanson	200 metre butterfly	2:13.23	9 FB	2:13.40	10
Diane Lacombe	100 metre backstroke	1:06.31	38	Did not advance	
Catherine Plewinski	50 metre freestyle	25.78	4 FA	25.36	4
Catherine Plewinski	100 metre freestyle	55.44	3 FA	55.72	5
Catherine Plewinski	200 metre freestyle	2:00.67	6 FA	1:59.88	4
Catherine Plewinski	100 metre butterfly	1:00.03	5 FA	59.01	3rd place, bronze medalist(s)
Julie Blaise; Julia Reggiani; Marie-Laure Giraudon; Véronique Jardin	4 × 100 metre freestyle relay	3:50.22	11	Did not advance	
Céline Bonnet; Audrey Guérit; Jacqueline Delord; Julie Blaise	4 × 100 metre medley relay	4:21.19	14	Did not advance	

== Synchronized swimming ==
Three synchronized swimmers represented France in 1992.

Athlete	Event	Figures		Qualification			Final		
Athlete	Event	Points	Rank	Points	Total (Figures + Qualification)	Rank	Points	Total (Figures + Final)	Rank
Marianne Aeschbacher	Solo	85.702	18	Did not advance					
Anne Capron	Solo	86.689	13 Q	94.800	181.489	5 Q	95.760	182.449	5
Karine Schuler	Solo	85.731	17	Did not advance					
Marianne Aeschbacher; Anne Capron	Duet	86.195	5	95.200	181.395	5 Q	95.600	181.795	5

== Table tennis ==
Men

Athlete	Event	Group Stage				Round of 16	Quarterfinal	Semifinal	Final	
Athlete	Event	Opposition Result	Opposition Result	Opposition Result	Rank	Opposition Result	Opposition Result	Opposition Result	Opposition Result	Rank
Nicolas Chatelain	Singles	Syed (GBR); L 0–2	Persson (SWE); L 1–2	Helmy (EGY); W 2–0	3	Did not advance				
Jean-Philippe Gatien	Singles	Bower (NZL); W 2–0	Musa (NGR); W 2–0	Kalinić (IOA); W 2–0	1 Q	Yoo (KOR); W 3–2	Yi (AUT); W 3–2	Ma (CHN); W 3–2	Waldner (SWE); L 0–3	2nd place, silver medalist(s)
Nicolas Chatelain; Patrick Chila	Doubles	Shibutani / Matsushita (JPN); L 0–2	Roßkopf / Fetzner (GER); L 0–2	Núñez / Morales (CHI); W 2–0	3	Did not advance				
Damien Éloi; Jean-Philippe Gatien	Doubles	Bower / Jackson (NZL); W 2–0	Musa / Olaleye (NGR); W 2–0	Grubba / Kucharski (POL); W 2–1	1 Q	—N/a	Lu / Wang (CHN); L 1–3	Did not advance		

Women

Athlete	Event	Group Stage				Round of 16	Quarterfinal	Semifinal	Final	
Athlete	Event	Opposition Result	Opposition Result	Opposition Result	Rank	Opposition Result	Opposition Result	Opposition Result	Opposition Result	Rank
Xiaoming Wang	Singles	Chan (HKG); W 2–0	Godes (ESP); W 2–0	Kim (PRK); L 1–2	2	Did not advance				
Emmanuelle Coubat; Xiaoming Wang	Doubles	Gee / Yip (USA); W 2–0	Gabaglio / Kim de Rimasa (ARG); W 2–0	Chai / Chan (HKG); L 0–2	2	Did not advance				

== Tennis ==
Men

Athlete	Event	Round of 64	Round of 32	Round of 16	Quarterfinals	Semifinals	Final	
Athlete	Event	Opposition Result	Opposition Result	Opposition Result	Opposition Result	Opposition Result	Opposition Result	Rank
Guy Forget	Singles	Caratti (ITA); W (6–3, 6–4, 6–2)	Larsson (SWE); L (3–6, 3–6, 1–6)	Did not advance				
Henri Leconte	Singles	Muster (AUT); W (7–6, 7–6, 6–4)	Lavalle (MEX); L (4–6, 6–3, 6–4, 3–6, 8–10)	Did not advance				
Fabrice Santoro	Singles	Miniussi (ARG); W (6–1, 7–6, 6–4)	Frana (ARG); W (4–6, 6–2, 6–1, 6–1)	Becker (GER); W (6–1, 3–6, 6–1, 6–3)	Ivanišević (CRO); L (7–6, 7–6, 4–6, 4–6, 6–8)	Did not advance		
Guy Forget; Henri Leconte	Doubles	—N/a	Couto / Mota (POR); W (6–1, 6–3, 6–1)	Frana / Miniussi (ARG); L (6–4, 7–6, 4–6, 4–6, 3–6)	Did not advance			

Women

Athlete	Event	Round of 64	Round of 32	Round of 16	Quarterfinals	Semifinals	Final	
Athlete	Event	Opposition Result	Opposition Result	Opposition Result	Opposition Result	Opposition Result	Opposition Result	Rank
Julie Halard	Singles	Nowak (POL); W (6–4, 7–6)	Muns-Jagerman (NED); L (6–7, 6–7)	Did not advance				
Mary Pierce	Singles	Meskhi (EUN); W (7–6, 7–5)	Basuki (INA); L (6–0, 3–6, 8–10)	Did not advance				
Nathalie Tauziat	Singles	Zrubáková (TCH); W (6–3, 6–2)	Rittner (GER); L (3–6, 2–6)	Did not advance				
Isabelle Demongeot; Nathalie Tauziat	Doubles	—N/a	de los Ríos / Schaerer (PAR); W (6–1, 7–6)	Hy / Simpson-Alter (CAN); W (3–6, 6–3, 6–2)	Martínez / Sánchez Vicario (ESP); L (2–6, 4–6)	Did not advance		

== Volleyball ==
Summary

Team	Event	Group stage						Quarterfinal	Semifinal	Final / BM	
Team	Event	Opposition Score	Opposition Score	Opposition Score	Opposition Score	Opposition Score	Rank	Opposition Score	Opposition Score	Opposition Score	Rank
France men's	Men's tournament	Italy; L 1–3	Japan; W 3–2	Canada; L 0–3	United States; L 0–3	Spain; L 2–3	6	—N/a		Algeria; W 3–0	11

=== Men's tournament ===
- Team roster
  - Rivo Andriamamonjy
  - Eric Bouvier
  - Laurent Chambertin
  - Arnaud Josserand
  - Olivier Lecat
  - Luc Marquet
  - Christophe Meneau
  - David Romann
  - Olivier Rossard
  - Philippe Salvan
  - Laurent Tillie
  - Eric Wolfer

Group play

Pos	Team	Pld	W	L	Pts	SW	SL	SR	SPW	SPL	SPR	Qualification
1	Italy	5	4	1	9	13	5	2.600	253	192	1.318	Quarterfinals
2	United States	5	4	1	9	13	8	1.625	287	257	1.117	Quarterfinals
3	Spain	5	3	2	8	11	12	0.917	283	299	0.946	Quarterfinals
4	Japan	5	2	3	7	10	12	0.833	277	291	0.952	Quarterfinals
5	Canada	5	1	4	6	10	12	0.833	286	279	1.025	9th place match
6	France	5	1	4	6	6	14	0.429	200	268	0.746	11th place match

Date		Score		Set 1	Set 2	Set 3	Set 4	Set 5	Total
26 Jul	Italy	3–1	France	9–15	15–5	15–8	15–2		54–30
28 Jul	France	3–2	Japan	15–8	9–15	15–11	10–15	15–9	64–58
30 Jul	Canada	3–0	France	15–7	15–8	15–6			45–21
1 Aug	United States	3–0	France	15–5	15–12	15–8			45–25
3 Aug	Spain	3–2	France	10–15	11–15	15–9	15–9	15–12	66–60

11th place match

Date		Score		Set 1	Set 2	Set 3	Set 4	Set 5	Total
5 Aug	France	3–0	Algeria	15–4	15–9	15–9			45–22

== Water polo ==
Summary

Key:

- FT – After full time.

Team	Event	Group stage						Classification round		
Team	Event	Opposition Score	Opposition Score	Opposition Score	Opposition Score	Opposition Score	Rank	Opposition Score	Opposition Score	Rank
France men's	Men's tournament	Germany; D 7–7	Australia; L 5–9	United States; L 7–11	Czechoslovakia; W 14–6	Unified Team; L 5–9	5	Greece; L 6–10	Netherlands; L 8–15	11

Team roster

- Thierry Alimondo
- Pierre Garsau
- Nicolas Jeleff
- François Besson
- Emmanuel Charlot
- Vincent De Nardi
- Emmanuel Ducher
- Christophe Gautier
- Christian Grimaldi
- Pascal Lousteanu
- Gilles Madelenat
- Jean-Marie Olivon
- Patrice Tillie

Head coach

- unknown

Group play

Pos	Team	Pld	W	D	L	GF	GA	GD	Pts
1	Unified Team	5	5	0	0	50	32	+18	10
2	United States	5	4	0	1	40	24	+16	8
3	Australia	5	2	1	2	44	41	+3	5
4	Germany	5	1	2	2	38	41	−3	4
5	France	5	1	1	3	38	42	−4	3
6	Czechoslovakia	5	0	0	5	33	63	−30	0

Source: https://www.olympedia.org/results/38777

1 August 1992; 18:30	France	7–7	Germany	Piscina Municipal de Montjuïc; Referees: Antal Vuszek (HUN), Eugenio Martínez (CUB)
1 August 1992; 18:30	Score by quarters: 2–2, 2–2, 2–3, 1–0			Piscina Municipal de Montjuïc; Referees: Antal Vuszek (HUN), Eugenio Martínez (CUB)
1 August 1992; 18:30	Jeleff 3	Goals	de la Peña 3	Piscina Municipal de Montjuïc; Referees: Antal Vuszek (HUN), Eugenio Martínez (CUB)

2 August 1992; 12:00	Australia	9–5	France	Piscina Bernat Picornell; Referees: Fred van Dorp (NED), Manuel de Jesús (PUR)
2 August 1992; 12:00	Score by quarters: 2–1, 2–0, 2–2, 3–2			Piscina Bernat Picornell; Referees: Fred van Dorp (NED), Manuel de Jesús (PUR)
2 August 1992; 12:00	Mayers, Clark 2	Goals	Jeleff 2	Piscina Bernat Picornell; Referees: Fred van Dorp (NED), Manuel de Jesús (PUR)

3 August 1992; 9:30	United States	11–7	France	Piscinas Bernat Picornell; Referees: Franco Picchetto (ITA), Lionel Liow (SGP)
3 August 1992; 9:30	Score by quarters: 2–0, 3–3, 3–1, 3–3			Piscinas Bernat Picornell; Referees: Franco Picchetto (ITA), Lionel Liow (SGP)
3 August 1992; 9:30	Humbert 3	Goals	Garsau 3	Piscinas Bernat Picornell; Referees: Franco Picchetto (ITA), Lionel Liow (SGP)

5 August 1992; 9:30	France	14–6	Czechoslovakia	Piscina Municipal de Montjuïc; Referees: David Bathurst (GBR), Nikolay Lalov (BUL)
5 August 1992; 9:30	Score by quarters: 4–1, 5–1, 2–2, 3–2			Piscina Municipal de Montjuïc; Referees: David Bathurst (GBR), Nikolay Lalov (BUL)
5 August 1992; 9:30	Garsau 4	Goals	six players 1	Piscina Municipal de Montjuïc; Referees: David Bathurst (GBR), Nikolay Lalov (BUL)

6 August 1992; 18:45	Unified Team	9–5	France	Piscina Municipal de Montjuïc; Referees: Franco Picchetto (ITA), Decio Patelli Junior (BRA)
6 August 1992; 18:45	Score by quarters: 3–2, 1–0, 2–1, 3–2			Piscina Municipal de Montjuïc; Referees: Franco Picchetto (ITA), Decio Patelli Junior (BRA)
6 August 1992; 18:45	Apanasenko 3	Goals	five players 1	Piscina Municipal de Montjuïc; Referees: Franco Picchetto (ITA), Decio Patelli Junior (BRA)

Classification round 9th-12th place

Pos	Team	Pld	W	D	L	GF	GA	GD	Pts
9	Netherlands	3	2	1	0	28	20	+8	5
10	Greece	3	2	1	0	24	18	+6	5
11	France	3	1	0	2	28	31	−3	2
12	Czechoslovakia	3	0	0	3	22	33	−11	0

8 August 1992; 9:30	Greece	10–6	France	Piscinas Bernat Picornell; Referees: Franco Picchetto (ITA), Lionel Liow (SGP)
8 August 1992; 9:30	Score by quarters: 2–0, 4–2, 1–2, 3–2			Piscinas Bernat Picornell; Referees: Franco Picchetto (ITA), Lionel Liow (SGP)
8 August 1992; 9:30	Seletopoulos 3	Goals	Ducher 3	Piscinas Bernat Picornell; Referees: Franco Picchetto (ITA), Lionel Liow (SGP)

9 August 1992; 10:15	Netherlands	15–8	France	Piscinas Bernat Picornell; Referees: Antal Vuszek (HUN), Nikolay Lalov (BUL)
9 August 1992; 10:15	Score by quarters: 8–0, 2–1, 4–4, 1–3			Piscinas Bernat Picornell; Referees: Antal Vuszek (HUN), Nikolay Lalov (BUL)
9 August 1992; 10:15	van Belkum 6	Goals	Ducher 3	Piscinas Bernat Picornell; Referees: Antal Vuszek (HUN), Nikolay Lalov (BUL)

== Weightlifting ==
Athlete	Event	Snatch		Clean & jerk		Total	Rank
Athlete	Event	Result	Rank	Result	Rank	Total	Rank
Pascal Arnou	56 kg	No lift		DNF			
Laurent Fombertasse	56 kg	112.5	7	147.5	4	260.0	4
David Balp	60 kg	120.0	11	142.5	20	262.5	17
Stéphane Sageder	82.5 kg	140.0	21	182.5	17	322.5	21
Cédric Plançon	90 kg	157.5	8	187.5	11	345.0	9
Francis Tournefier	100 kg	170.0	6	217.5	2	387.5	4

== Wrestling ==
Greco-Roman

Athlete	Event	Group Stage							Final	
Athlete	Event	Opposition Result	Opposition Result	Opposition Result	Opposition Result	Opposition Result	Opposition Result	Rank	Opposition Result	Rank
Serge Robert	52 kg	Kamesaki (FIN); L 1–2	Rebegea (ROU); L 1–2	Did not advance				7	Did not advance	
Patrice Mourier	57 kg	Hall (USA); W 3–0	Dimitrov (BUL); W 4–1	Lara (CUB); L 1–2	Yildiz (GER); L 0–6	Did not advance		6	Did not advance	
Ghani Yalouz	68 kg	Sabo (IOA); W 4–2	Cărare (ROU); W 3–2	Stoyanov (BUL); W 3–2	Repka (HUN); L 0–6	Bye	Smith (USA); L 5–7	3	Chamangoli (IRI); W w/o	5
Yvon Riemer	74 kg	Wei (CHN); W Fall	Triantafyllidis (GRE); W 8–0	Almanza (CUB); L 0–0	Kasap (CAN); W 13–0	Bye	Iskandaryan (EUN); L 1–7	3	Marchl (AUT); W 12–0	5
Martial Mischler	82 kg	Pappas (GRE); W 2–0	Henderson (USA); L 2–7	Bye	Fredriksson (SWE); L 0–2	Did not advance		6	Did not advance	
Henri Meiss	90 kg	Ivošević (IOA); W 1–0	Konstantinidis (GRE); L 1–6	Foy (USA); L Fall	Did not advance			7	Did not advance	

Freestyle

Athlete	Event	Group Stage						Final	
Athlete	Event	Opposition Result	Opposition Result	Opposition Result	Opposition Result	Opposition Result	Rank	Opposition Result	Rank
Thierry Bourdin	52 kg	Leyva (CUB); L 1–4	Sato (JPN); L Fall	Did not advance			8	Did not advance	
Gérard Santoro	68 kg	Brown (AUS); W 4–3	Al-Aosta (SYR); W 1–0	Getsov (BUL); L 2–9	Akbarnejad (IRI); L 0–3	Did not advance	5	Elekes (HUN); W w/o	9
Alcide Legrand	82 kg	Lohyňa (TCH); L 0–6	Leitão (BRA); W 15–0	Ghiță (ROU); L 2–3	Did not advance		7	Did not advance	
