= Daniel Costantini =

French handball player (born 1943)

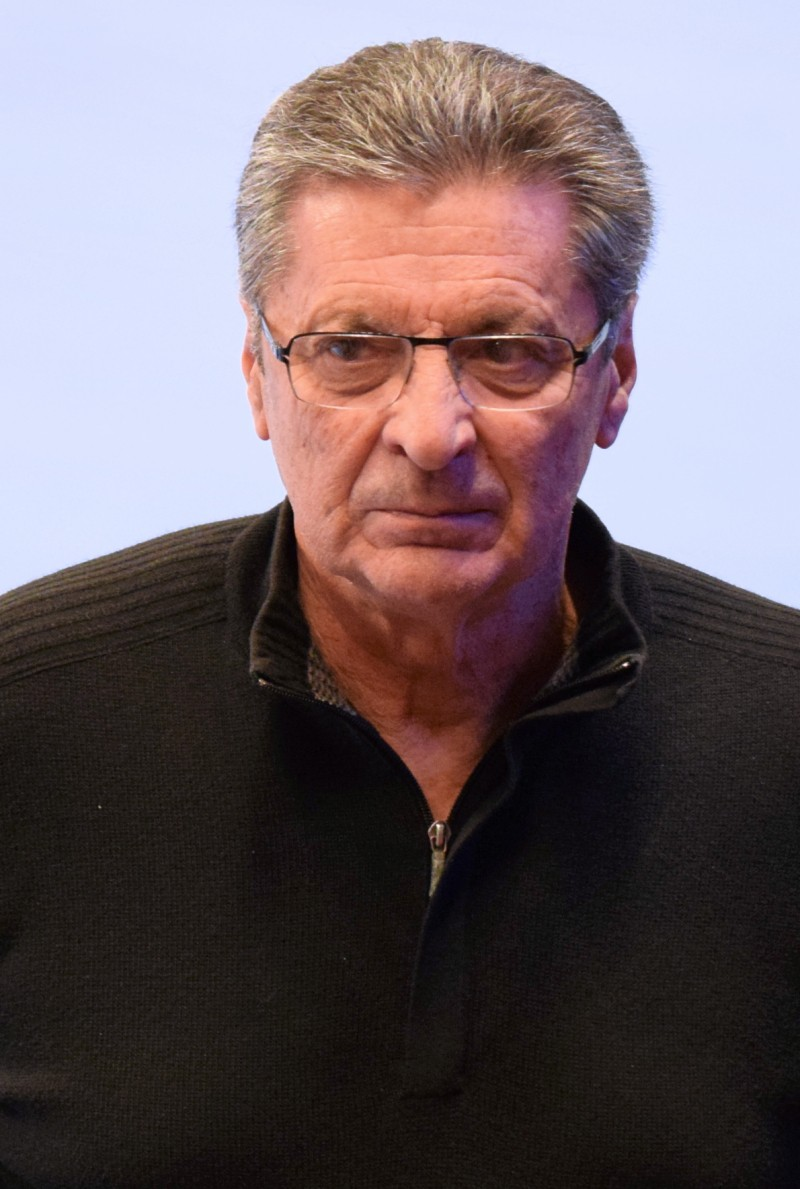
- Constantini on November 19th, 2014

Personal information
- Nationality: French
- Born: 19 November 1943 (age 82) Marsielle, France

Sport
- Sport: Handball
- Position: Centre back / left back

Senior clubs
- Years: Team
- 1959-1973: Stade Marseillais Université Club
National team
Years	Team	Apps
1965–1968	France	6

Teams managed
- 1973-1985: Stade Marseillais Université Club
- 1985-2001: France
Medal record
Olympic Games
Bronze medal – third place	1992 Barcelona	Team
World Championships
Gold medal – first place	1995 Iceland
Gold medal – first place	2001 France
Silver medal – second place	1993 Sweden
Silver medal – second place	1997 Japan

Daniel Costantini (born 31 October 1943) is a French former handball player and coach. He is widely regarded as one of the best handball coaches of all time. In 1995, he led the French national team to their first ever gold medal, when he won the World Championship as the head coach.

In 2001, he was made a knight of the French Legion of Honour. On April 30, 2023, he was inducted into the French national team Hall of Fame.

== Playing career ==
At the age of 16 he joined Stade Marseillais Université Club where he won the 1962 French Junior championship. After breaking through on the first team he won the 1965, 1967, and 1969 French Championship.

Between 1965 and 1968, he played 6 matches for the French national team.

After he injured his cruciate ligament in 1966, the doctors accidentally removed his meniscus. This made him miss the 1967 World Championship, and over time the persistent knee pain would cause his early retirement at age 29.

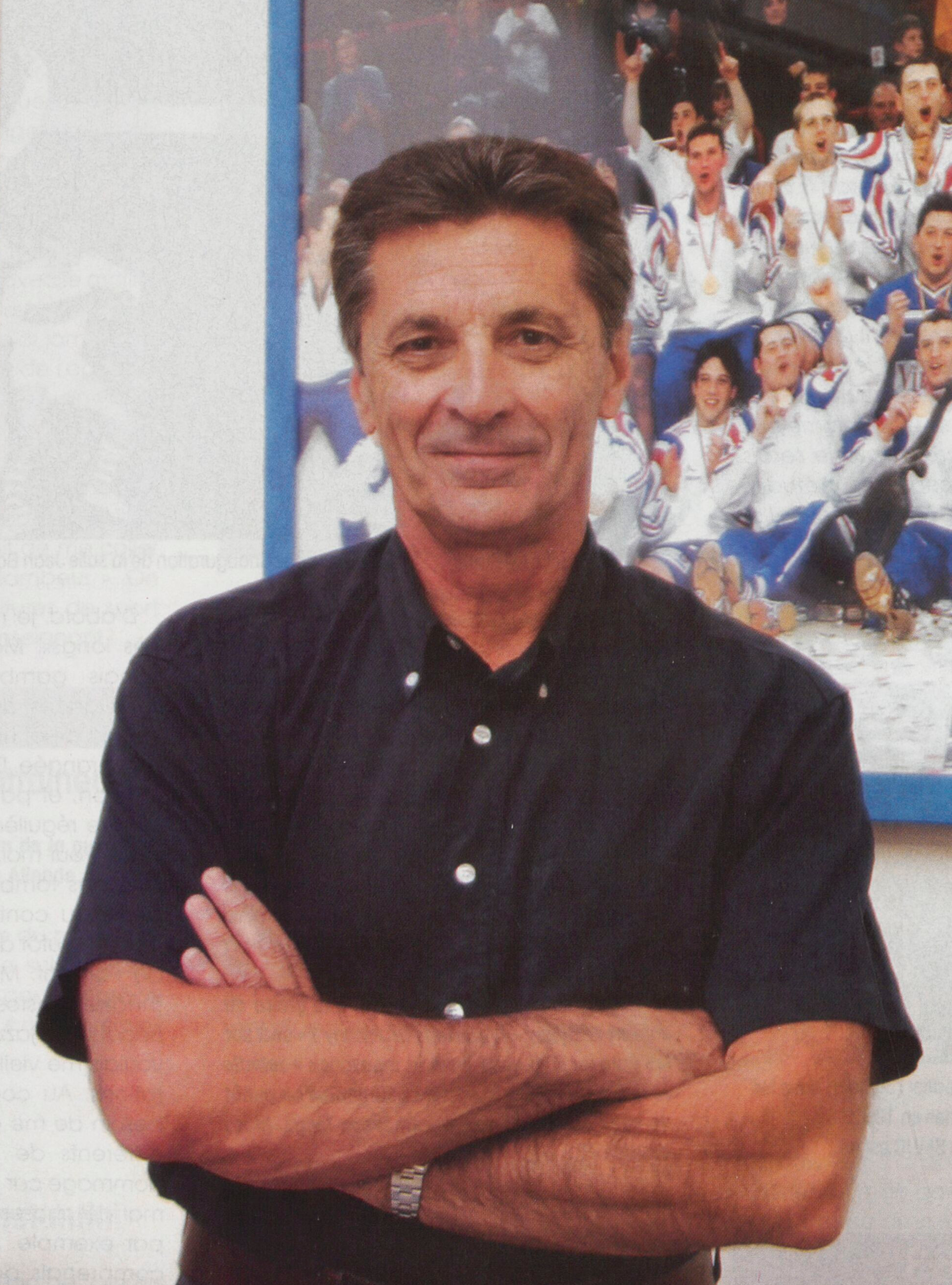
Costantini in 2003

== Coaching career ==
After retiring at the age of 29 in 1973 he became a coach at Stade Marseillais Université Club. Here he won the French championship in 1975 and 1985 and the French Cup in 1976.

In 1985 he became the head coach of the French national team. At the 1987 Mediterranean Games he won silver medals.

AFterwards he started calling up the younger generation including, Philippe Gardent, Pascal Mahé and Frédéric Volle, which over time became a dominant in international handball. At the B-World Championship in 1989 he and the French team finished 5th, which qualified them for the 1990 World Championship. Through a 9th place, he qualified France for the 1992 Olympics.

In Barcelona, he won bronze medals with the French team, led by a 21 year old Jackson Richardson. This was the first ever French medal at a major international tournament.

In 1993 he won silver medals at the 1993 World Championship, losing to Russia in the final. In 1995 he won France's first ever gold medal at a major international tournament, when he won the 1995 World Championship.

Two years later he won bronze medals at the 1997 World Championship. Once again he was noted for integrating a group of young players including the brothers Guillaume and Bertrand Gille.

At the 2001 World Championship at home, he one his second World Championship gold medal, before retiring. He was replaced by Claude Onesta.

At the end of his tenure, France had cemented its place as one of the best national teams in the world.

At a poll hosted by the International Handball Federation in 2010, Costantini was selected as the 'Best Coach of All time' with 87.8% of the votes.
