= Laurent Munier =

French handball player (born 1966)

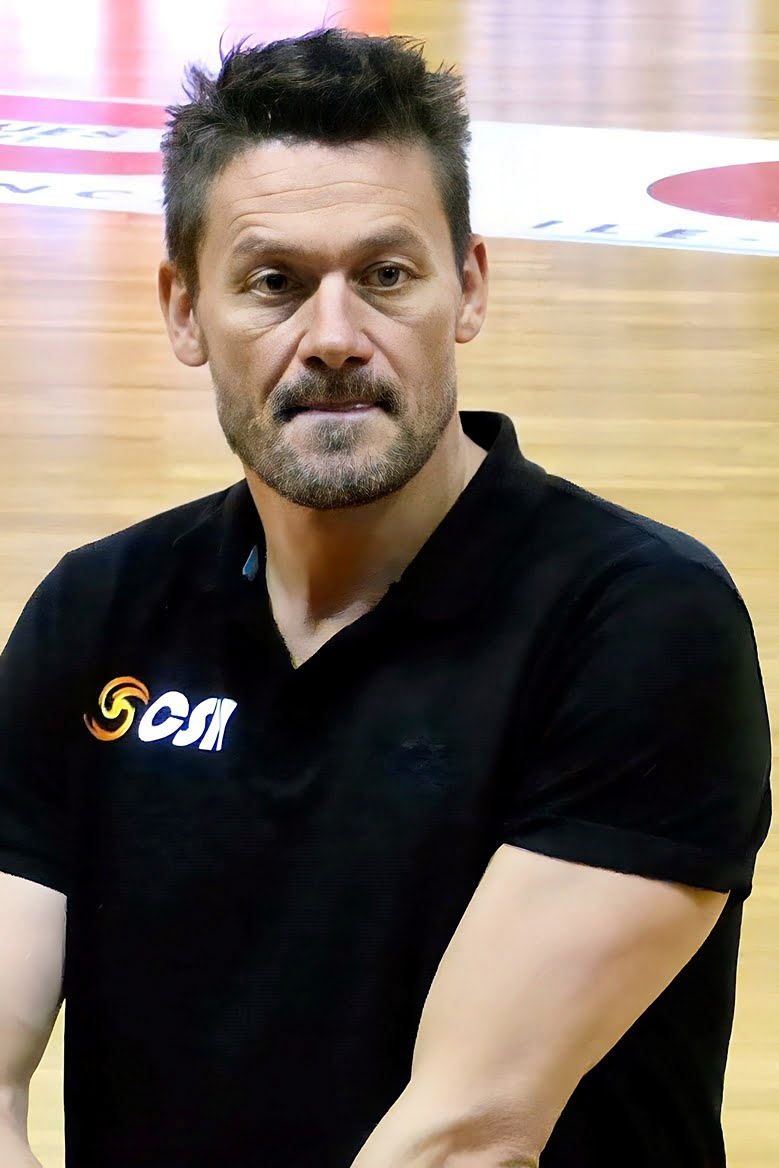
- Laurent Munier general manager of the Chambery Savoie Handball club during the match facing the US Ivry. 26 April 2014

Personal information
- Full name: Laurent Farci Munier
- Nickname: Lolo
- Nationality: French
- Born: 30 September 1964 (age 62) Lyon, France
- Height: 190 cm (75 in)

Sport
- Sport: Handball
- Position: Centre back / right back

Youth career
- Years: Team
- 1977-1985: Villeurbanne HBC

Senior clubs
- Years: Team
- 1985-1987: HBC Villefranche
- 1987-1993: Vénissieux HB
- 1993-1996: OM Vitrolles
- 1996-1997: Istres Provence Handball
- 12/1997-1998: VfL Gummersbach
- 1998-1999: SG PSV Solingen
- 1999-2002: Chambéry SG
National team
Years	Team	Apps	(Gls)
1987–1995	France	154	(305)

Teams managed
- 2002-: Chambéry SMB HB General Director
Medal record
Olympic Games
Bronze medal – third place	1992 Barcelona	Team
World Championships
Silver medal – second place	1993 Sweden
Gold medal – first place	1995 Iceland

Laurent Munier (born 30 September 1966 in Lyon) is a French former handball player and since 2002 the sporting director at who competed in the 1992 Summer Olympics. He won the 1995 World Championship with the French national team.

== Career ==
Munier started playing handball at Villeurbanne HBC in his hometown Lyon. In 1985 he joined second tier team HBC Villefranche, where he managed to get promoted in 1986 to the top french league. In 1987 he joined Vénissieux HB, where he won the 1992 French championship and the 1991 and 1992 Coupe de France. In 1993 he joined OM Vitrolles. Here he won the French championship again in 1994 and 1996 and the Coupe de France in 1995. In 1994 he reached the final of the EHF Cup Winners' Cup, but lost the final to FC Barcelona. When OM Vitrolles in 1996 had financial issues and were administratively relegated, he joined Istres Provence Handball.

After a season at Istres, he was without a club for half a year before joining the German Bundesliga side VfL Gummersbach in December 1997. Here he played the rest of the season, before joining the 2nd Bundesliga team SG PSV Solingen in 1998. From 1999 to 2003 he played for Chambéry SG, where he won the French Championship in 2001 and the French League Cup in 2002, before retiring.

After he retired as a player, he became the general director at Chambéry SG, where he had played himself.

=== National team ===
Munier debuted for the French National Team in 1987. In 1992 he was a member of the French team which won the bronze medal at the 1992 Olympics. He played all seven matches and scored 26 goals. A year later he won silver medals at the 1993 World Championship.

Two years later he won the 1995 World Championship.

In 1994 he was temporarily excluded from the French national team by head coach Daniel Costantini for "unacceptable behaviour towards the referees".
