= Denis Tristant =

French handball player (born 1964)

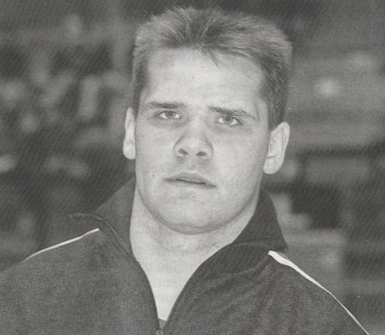
- Denis Tristant (1990)

Personal information
- Full name: Denis Guy Michel Tristant
- Nationality: French
- Born: 23 November 1964 (age 61) Pacy-sur-Eure, France
- Height: 1.80 m (5 ft 11 in)

Sport
- Sport: Handball
- Position: Right wing
- Current club: Paris 92

Senior clubs
- Years: Team
- 1982-1983: SPN Vernon
- 1983-1987: Paris Université Club
- 1987-1988: US Ivry HB
- 1988-1992: US Créteil HB
- 1992-1997: Massy EH
National team
| Years | Team | Apps |
| 1987–1992 | France | 141 |
Medal record
Men's Handball
| Bronze medal – third place | 1992 Barcelona | Team |

Denis Tristant (born 23 November 1964 in Pacy-sur-Eure) is a French handball player who competed in the 1992 Summer Olympics.

In 1992 he was a member of the French handball team which won the Olympic bronze medal. This was the first time France won a medal at a major international tournament. He played three matches and scored one goal.

== Career ==
Tristant played at SPN Vernon until 1983 where he joined Paris Université Club, where he played with Pascal Mahé and Philippe Gardent. In 1987 he joined US Ivry HB for a single season, before joining US Créteil HB. Here he won the 1989 French championship and French cup double. In the same season he also reached the final of the EHF Cup Winners' Cup.

In 1992 he joined second league team Massy EH. With the team he was promoted to the top French league in 1993.

He debuted for the French national team in 1987. The same year he won silver medals at the 1987 Mediterranean Games.
