= 1993 World Men's Handball Championship =

Tournament details
- Host country: Sweden
- Dates: 10–20 March
- Teams: 16 (from 4 confederations)

Final positions
- Champions: Russia (1st title)
- Runners-up: France
- Third place: Sweden
- Fourth place: Switzerland

Tournament statistics
- Matches played: 54
- Goals scored: 2,451 (45.39 per match)
- Top scorers: József Éles (HUN); Kyung-Shin Yoon (KOR); Marc Baumgartner (SUI) (41 goals each)

The 1993 World Men's Handball Championship was the 13th handball World Championship. It was held in Sweden 10–20 March. Russia won the championship.

== Qualification ==
Competition	Vacancies	Qualified
Host nation	1	Sweden
1990 World Men's Handball Championship	7	Russia; Romania; Spain; Hungary; Czechoslovakia; Germany; France
1992 World Men's Handball Championship Group B	5	Norway; Austria; Iceland; Switzerland; Denmark
1991 Asian Men's Handball Championship	1	South Korea
1992 African Men's Handball Championship	1	Egypt
American Qualification Tournament	1	United States

== Teams ==
Group A	Group B	Group C	Group D
Austria	France	Hungary	Denmark
Czechoslovakia*	Norway	Iceland	Germany
Egypt	Romania	Sweden	Russia
Spain	Switzerland	United States	South Korea

*Note: Although the Czech Republic and Slovakia became separate countries in 1993, the countries still competed together in the tournament as the Czechoslovak Handball Federation was not split yet.

== Preliminary round ==
Top 3 from groups A & B plays in group 1 while top 3 from groups C & D plays in group 2 in the main round. The teams carry their results against the other teams to the main round. The last team from each group is eliminated from the championship.

=== Group A ===
Team	Pld	W	D	L	GF	GA	GD	Pts
Spain	3	2	1	0	58	48	+10	5
Czechoslovakia	3	1	1	1	61	60	+1	3
Egypt	3	1	0	2	58	63	−5	2
Austria	3	1	0	2	61	67	−6	2

10 March; 18:00	Czechoslovakia	20–21	Egypt	Umeå
10 March; 18:00		(11–13)		Umeå

10 March; 20:00	Spain	22–15	Austria	Umeå
10 March; 20:00		(9–7)		Umeå

12 March; 18:00	Austria	20–22	Czechoslovakia	Umeå
12 March; 18:00		(8–12)		Umeå

12 March; 20:00	Egypt	14–17	Spain	Umeå
12 March; 20:00		(9–8)		Umeå

13 March; 14:00	Austria	26–23	Egypt	Umeå
13 March; 14:00		(14–9)		Umeå

13 March; 16:00	Spain	19–19	Czechoslovakia	Umeå
13 March; 16:00		(12–10)		Umeå

=== Group B ===
Team	Pld	W	D	L	GF	GA	GD	Pts
Switzerland	3	2	0	1	65	59	+6	4
France	3	2	0	1	68	68	0	4
Romania	3	1	1	1	56	56	0	3
Norway	3	0	1	2	51	57	−6	1

10 March; 18:00	France	24–26	Switzerland	Karlstad
10 March; 18:00		(10–8)		Karlstad

10 March; 20:00	Romania	15–15	Norway	Karlstad
10 March; 20:00		(6–9)		Karlstad

12 March; 18:00	Switzerland	18–19	Romania	Karlstad
12 March; 18:00		(7–10)		Karlstad

12 March; 20:00	Norway	20–21	France	Karlstad
12 March; 20:00		(11–10)		Karlstad

13 March; 14:00	Norway	16–21	Switzerland	Karlstad
13 March; 14:00		(9–10)		Karlstad

13 March; 16:00	Romania	22–23	France	Karlstad
13 March; 16:00		(10–9)		Karlstad

=== Group C ===
Team	Pld	W	D	L	GF	GA	GD	Pts
Sweden	3	3	0	0	73	51	+22	6
Iceland	3	2	0	1	75	61	+14	4
Hungary	3	1	0	2	73	63	+10	2
United States	3	0	0	3	53	99	−46	0

9 March; 19:00	Sweden	21–16	Iceland	Gothenburg
9 March; 19:00		(9–9)		Gothenburg

9 March; 21:00	Hungary	33–18	United States	Gothenburg
9 March; 21:00		(16–8)		Gothenburg

11 March; 18:00	Iceland	25–21	Hungary	Gothenburg
11 March; 18:00		(11–8)		Gothenburg

11 March; 20:00	United States	16–32	Sweden	Gothenburg
11 March; 20:00		(9–13)		Gothenburg

13 March; 14:00	Iceland	34–19	United States	Gothenburg
13 March; 14:00		(14–7)		Gothenburg

13 March; 16:00	Sweden	20–19	Hungary	Gothenburg
13 March; 16:00		(12–9)		Gothenburg

=== Group D ===
Team	Pld	W	D	L	GF	GA	GD	Pts
Russia	3	2	1	0	78	55	+23	5
Germany	3	1	2	0	67	64	+3	4
Denmark	3	0	2	1	54	62	−8	2
South Korea	3	0	1	2	59	77	−18	1

10 March; 18:00	Russia	33–18	South Korea	Malmö
10 March; 18:00		(17–6)		Malmö

10 March; 20:00	Germany	20–20	Denmark	Malmö
10 March; 20:00		(10–11)		Malmö

12 March; 18:00	South Korea	25–28	Germany	Malmö
12 March; 18:00		(11–16)		Malmö

12 March; 20:00	Denmark	18–26	Russia	Malmö
12 March; 20:00		(10–13)		Malmö

13 March; 14:00	South Korea	16–16	Denmark	Malmö
13 March; 14:00		(10–9)		Malmö

13 March; 16:00	Russia	19–19	Germany	Malmö
13 March; 16:00		(5–10)		Malmö

== Ranking round ==
Team	Pld	W	D	L	GF	GA	GD	Pts
Norway	3	2	1	0	94	66	+28	5
Austria	3	2	1	0	86	71	+15	5
South Korea	3	1	0	2	92	90	+2	2
United States	3	0	0	3	62	107	−45	0

15 March	Norway	30–28	South Korea	Eskilstuna
15 March		(11–13)		Eskilstuna

15 March	Austria	31–19	United States	Eskilstuna
15 March		(14–12)		Eskilstuna

16 March	United States	15–41	Norway	Eskilstuna
16 March		(6–22)		Eskilstuna

16 March	South Korea	29–32	Austria	Eskilstuna

18 March	Austria	23–23	Norway	Eskilstuna
18 March		(12–13)		Eskilstuna

18 March	United States	28–35	South Korea	Eskilstuna
18 March		(16–18)		Eskilstuna

== Main round ==
The winners of each group face of against each other in the final. The second-place finishers play the game for 3rd position, the third-place finishers play the game for 5th position and so on.

=== Group 1 ===
Team	Pld	W	D	L	GF	GA	GD	Pts
France	5	4	0	1	115	103	+12	8
Switzerland	5	3	0	2	121	118	+3	6
Spain	5	2	1	2	105	101	+4	5
Czechoslovakia	5	2	1	2	104	110	−6	5
Romania	5	2	0	3	105	110	−5	4
Egypt	5	1	0	4	100	108	−8	2

15 March; 16:00	Egypt	23–26	Switzerland	Halmstad
15 March; 16:00		(9–12)		Halmstad

15 March; 18:00	Spain	20–16	Romania	Halmstad
15 March; 18:00		(11–7)		Halmstad

15 March; 20:00	Czechoslovakia	18–26	France	Halmstad
15 March; 20:00		(7–13)		Halmstad

16 March; 16:00	Romania	27–26	Egypt	Halmstad
16 March; 16:00		(14–8)		Halmstad

16 March; 18:00	Switzerland	23–24	Czechoslovakia	Halmstad
16 March; 18:00		(13–10)		Halmstad

16 March; 20:00	France	23–21	Spain	Halmstad
16 March; 20:00		(9–12)		Halmstad

18 March; 16:00	Egypt	16–19	France	Halmstad
18 March; 16:00		(7–11)		Halmstad

18 March; 18:00	Czechoslovakia	23–21	Romania	Halmstad
18 March; 18:00		(11–12)		Halmstad

18 March; 20:00	Spain	28–29	Switzerland	Halmstad
18 March; 20:00		(10–16)		Halmstad

=== Group 2 ===
Team	Pld	W	D	L	GF	GA	GD	Pts
Russia	5	4	1	0	131	98	+33	9
Sweden	5	4	0	1	108	101	+7	8
Germany	5	2	2	1	100	100	0	6
Iceland	5	2	0	3	103	114	−11	4
Denmark	5	1	1	3	102	117	−15	3
Hungary	5	0	0	5	104	118	−14	0

15 March; 16:00	Hungary	22–29	Russia	Stockholm
15 March; 16:00		(10–15)		Stockholm

15 March; 18:00	Iceland	16–23	Germany	Stockholm
15 March; 18:00		(5–10)		Stockholm

15 March; 20:00	Sweden	23–20	Denmark	Stockholm
15 March; 20:00		(13–9)		Stockholm

16 March; 18:00	Denmark	22–21	Hungary	Stockholm
16 March; 18:00		(11–12)		Stockholm

16 March; 20:00	Russia	27–19	Iceland	Stockholm
16 March; 20:00		(12–9)		Stockholm

17 March; 19:00	Germany	16–24	Sweden	Stockholm
17 March; 19:00		(7–9)		Stockholm

18 March; 16:00	Hungary	21–22	Germany	Stockholm
18 March; 16:00		(7–12)		Stockholm

18 March; 18:00	Iceland	27–22	Denmark	Stockholm
18 March; 18:00		(13–7)		Stockholm

18 March; 20:00	Sweden	20–30	Russia	Stockholm
18 March; 20:00		(8–11)		Stockholm

== Placement round ==
=== 11th place match ===
19 March; 18:00	Egypt	25–29	Hungary	Stockholm
19 March; 18:00		(13–12)		Stockholm

=== 9th place match ===
19 March; 20:00	Romania	23–27	Denmark	Stockholm
19 March; 20:00		(13–14)		Stockholm

=== 7th place match ===
20 March; 12:00	Czechoslovakia	22–21	Iceland	Stockholm
20 March; 12:00		(8–11)		Stockholm

=== 5th place match ===
20 March; 14:00	Spain	29–26	Germany	Stockholm
20 March; 14:00		(16–13)		Stockholm

=== Bronze final ===
20 March; 16:00	Switzerland	19–26	Sweden	Stockholm
20 March; 16:00		(16–13)		Stockholm

=== Final ===
20 March; 18:00	France	19–28	Russia	Stockholm
20 March; 18:00		(11–13)		Stockholm

== Final standings ==
Rank	Team
Gold medal	Russia
Silver medal	France
Bronze medal	Sweden
4	Switzerland
5	Spain
6	Germany
7	Czechoslovakia
8	Iceland
9	Denmark
10	Romania
11	Hungary
12	Egypt
13	Norway
14	Austria
15	South Korea
16	United States

== Medal summary ==
Gold	Silver	Bronze
Russia Andrey Antonevich; Vyacheslav Atavin; Talant Duyshebaev; Dmitry Filippov; Aleksey Frantsuzov; Valeri Gopin; Vyacheslav Gorpishin; Oleg Grebnev; Dmitry Karlov; Oleg Kisselev; Vasily Kudinov; Andrey Lavrov; Oleg Sapronov; Pavel Sukosyan; Dmitri Torgovanov; Igor Vasilyev	France Philippe Gardent; Christian Gaudin; Philippe Julia; Denis Lathoud; Patrick Lepetit; Pascal Mahé; Gaël Monthurel; Laurent Munier; Frederic Perez; Thierry Perreux; Éric Quintin; Jackson Richardson; Philippe Schaaf; Stéphane Stoecklin; Jean-Luc Thiébaut; Frédéric Volle	Sweden Magnus Andersson; Anders Bäckegren; Per Carlén; Magnus Cato; Erik Hajas; Jerry Hallbäck; Robert Hedin; Tony Hedin; Ola Lindgren; Mats Olsson; Staffan Olsson; Tomas Svensson; Pierre Thorsson; Robert Venäläinen; Magnus Wislander

== Top goalscorers ==
Player	Goals
1. Marc Baumgartner (SWI)	41
1. Kyung-Shin Yoon (KOR)	41
1. József Éles (HUN)	41
4. Valeri Gopin (RUS)	39
5. Mateo Garralda (ESP)	38
6. Sigurður Valur Sveinsson (ISL)	37
7. Sameh Abdel Waress (EGY)	36
7. Vasily Kudinov (RUS)	36
7. Magnus Andersson (SWE)	36
10. Andreas Dittert (AUT)	33

== Top goalkeepers ==
Player
1. Lorenzo Rico (ESP)
2. Tomas Svensson (SWE)
3. Mats Olsson (SWE)
4. Andrey Lavrov (RUS)
5. Lubomir Svajlen (CSK)
6. Ewald Humenberger (AUT)
7. Peter Hürlimann (SWI)
8. Andreas Thiel (GER)
9. Guðmundur Hrafnkelsson (ISL)
10. Sorin Toacsen (ROM)
