= Thierry Perreux =

French handball player and coach (born 1963)

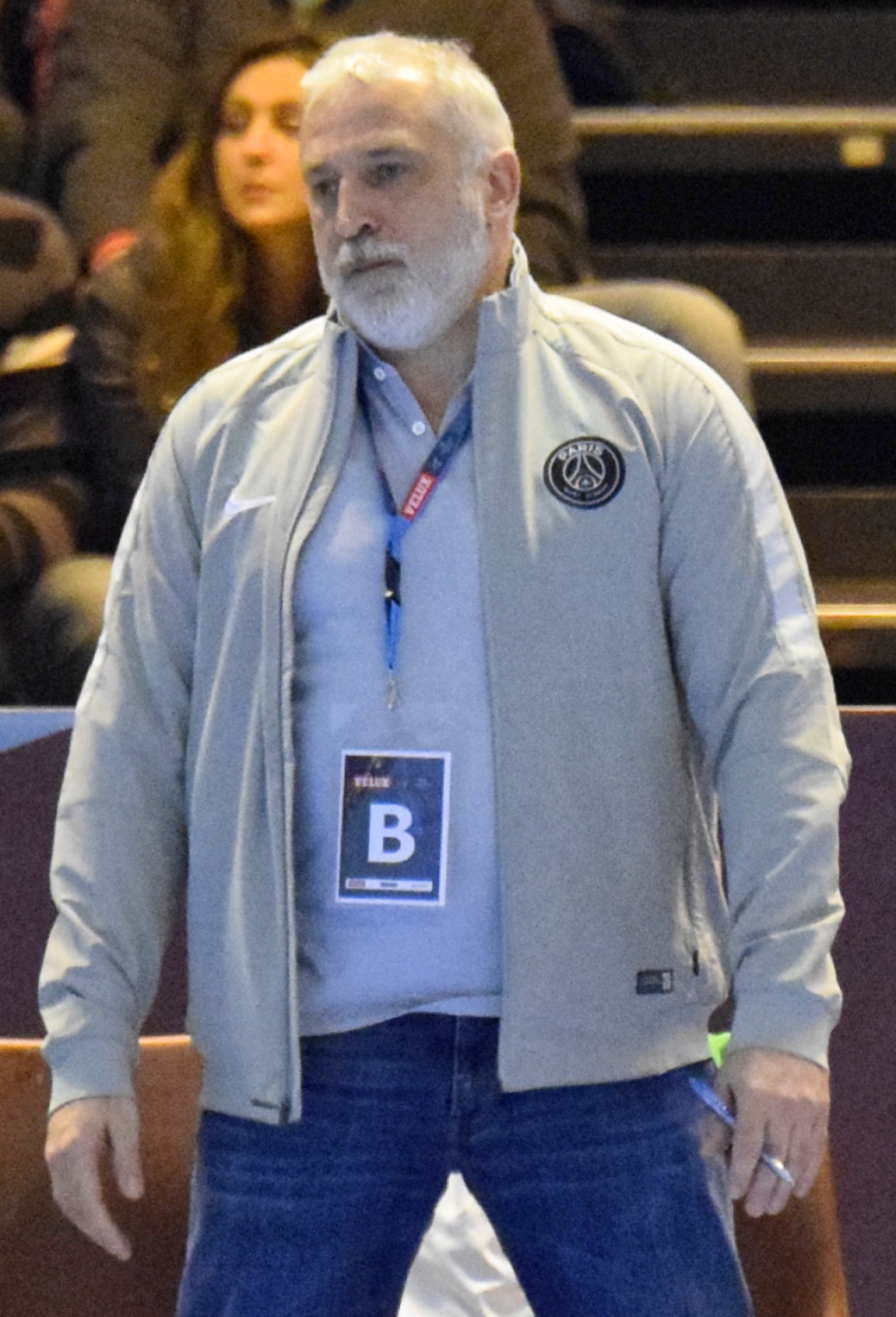
- Perreux (2015)

Personal information
- Nationality: French
- Born: 4 March 1964 (age 62) Soisy-sous-Montmorency, France
- Height: 178 cm (70 in)

Sport
- Sport: Handball
- Position: Right wing

Youth career
- Years: Team
- 1972-1980: Saint-Gratien/Sannois HB

Senior clubs
- Years: Team
- 1980-1991: USM Gagny
- 1991-1992: Vénissieux HB
- 1992-1996: Olympique de Marseille Vitrolle
- 1996-1998: UMS Pontault-Combault HB
National team
Years	Team	Apps	(Gls)
1984-1995	France	248	(476)

Teams managed
- 2002-2007: Villeurbanne
- 2007-2008: Tremblay-en-France Handball
- 2008-2012: Villeurbanne
- 2012-2015: Paris Saint-Germain assistant
- 2015: Paris Saint-Germain reserves
Medal record
Olympics
Bronze medal – third place	1992 Barcelona
World Championship
Silver medal – second place	1993 Sweden
Gold medal – first place	1995 Iceland

Thierry Perreux (born 4 March 1963 in Soisy-sous-Montmorency, Val-d'Oise) is a French handball coach and former player. As a player he won the 1995 World Championship. He also won bronze medals competed in the 1992 Summer Olympics.

== Career ==
Perreux started played handball at Saint-Gratien/Sannois HB. In 1980 he joined the French top league team USM Gagny. Here he won the 1981, 1982, 1985, 1986 and 1987 Frencg Championship and the 1987 Coupe de France. After eleven years he left Gagny and joined Vénissieux HB, where he won the French double in 1992. After a single season he left for OM Vitrolles, where he won the French championship in 1994 and 1996, the Coupe de France in 1993 and 1995 and the 1993 EHF Cup Winners' Cup.

At the end of his career he played for UMS Pontault-Combault HB, before retiring in 1998.

=== National team ===
In the 1992 Olympics he was a member of the French handball team which won bronze medals. He played six matches and scored eight goals.

The year after he won silver medals at the 1993 World Championship.

In 1995 he won the World Championship.

== Coaching career ==
After retiring he became the coach at Villeurbanne. In 2007 he joined Tremblay-en-France Handball.

In 2012 he became the assistant coach at Paris Saint-Germain under Philippe Gardent. In 2013 he extended his contract until 2015. In 2015 Philippe Gardent was replaced by Zvonimir Serdarušić, and Thierry Perreux instead became the technical coach and manager of the PSG reserve team.

== Titles ==
=== As Player ===
==== Club ====
- French Championship:
  - Winner: 1981, 1982, 1985, 1986, 1987, 1992, 1994 and 1996
- French Cup:
  - Winner: 1987, 1992, 1993 and 1995
- EHF Cup Winners' Cup:
  - Winner: 1993

==== National team ====
- World Championship:
  - Winner: 1995
  - Silver Medals: 1993
- Olympics:
  - Bronze Medals: 1992

=== As Assistant Coach ===
- French Championship:
  - Winner: 2013, 2015
- French Cup:
  - Winner: 2014
