= USM Gagny =

French handball club

- Full name: Union sportive municipale de Gagny
- Founded: 1948; 78 years ago
- Dissolved: 1996; 30 years ago

Union sportive municipale de Gagny, often just called USM Gagny, was a multisports club from Gagny, France, most famous for its handball team that won the French Championship 5 times in the 1980's on the men's side and 4 times in the 1980's and 90's on the women's side. The team was dissolved in 1996 due to dept.

== History ==
The club was founded in 1948, led by the then vice-president of the French Handball Federation, M. Raymond Valliet.

In 1971 the men's team was promoted to the top division, and by the end of the 1970's it had established itself as one of the best teams in France. In the 1979-80 season they finished second, and in 1981 and 1982 they won the French Championship. In the 1987 season the men's team won the Coupe de France. Meanwhile the women's team won the French Championship four times and the French Cup three times in the 80's and early 90's.

In 1984 they became the first French handball team to have a shirt sponsor.

During the 1990's French handball became more and more professional, which gave USM Gagny economic problems, and they filed for bankruptcy in 1996.

== Accomplishments ==
=== Men's handball ===
- French league:
  - Winner (5): 1981, 1982, 1985, 1986, 1987
  - Runners-up (2): 1980, 1984
  - Third place (3): 1988, 1989, 1990
- Coupe de France:
  - Winner (1): 1987
  - Runners-up (2): 1985, 1990

=== Women's Handball ===
- French league:
  - Winner (4): 1985, 1987, 1991, 1992
  - Runners-up (2): 1986, 1989, 1990, 1993, 1994
- Coupe de France:
  - Winner (3): 1985, 1992, 1993
  - Runners-up (2): 1990, 1994

== Famous former players ==
- (France) Joël Abati
- (France) Éric Cailleaux
- (France) Frédéric Dole
- (France) Philippe Médard
- (France) Gaël Monthurel
- (France) Thierry Perreux
- (France) Frédéric Perez
- (France) Philippe Gardent
- (France) Jean-Michel Germain
- (Serbia) Aleksandar Knežević
- (France) Valérie Nicolas
- (Socialist Federal Republic of Yugoslavia) Ljiljana Mugoša
- (Socialist Federal Republic of Yugoslavia) Svetlana Mugoša-Antić
