= Mats Olsson (handballer) =

Swedish handball player (born 1960)

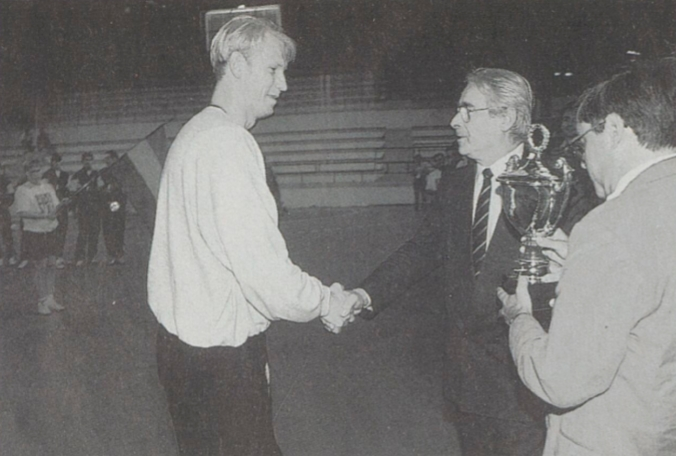

Personal information
- Full name: Mats Åke Olsson
- Nationality: Sweden
- Born: 12 January 1960 (age 66) Malmö, Sweden
- Height: 196 cm (77 in)

Sport
- Sport: Handball
- Position: Goalkeeper

Youth career
- Years: Team
- –: Dalhems IF

Senior clubs
- Years: Team
- -1980: Dalhems IF
- 1980-1988: Lugi HF
- 1988-1994: Teka Santander
- 1994-1996: Ystads IF
- 1996-1997: Caja Cantabria
National team
Years	Team	Apps	(Gls)
1979-1997	Sweden	294	(2)

Teams managed
- 2001-2005: Portugal (assistant)
- 2005-2012: Portugal
- 2005-??: Norway women (gk coach)
- 2014-2021: Sweden gk coach
- 2021-: Elverum Håndball gk coach
Medal record
Men's Handball
Silver medal – second place	1992 Barcelona	Team
Silver medal – second place	1996 Atlanta	Team
World Championship
Gold medal – first place	1990 Czechoslovakia
Silver medal – second place	1997 Japan
Bronze medal – third place	1993 Sweden
Bronze medal – third place	1995 Iceland
European Championship
Gold medal – first place	1994 Portugal

Mats Åke Olsson (born 12 January 1960) is a Swedish retired handball goalkeeper, who is currently goalkeeping coach for Norway women's national handball team and Elverum Håndball.

He was inducted into the EHF Hall of Fame in 2024.

== Player career ==
Olsson played 294 caps for Sweden between 1979 and 1997. He competed at 4 summer olympics and 6 World championships. Mats Olsson started his career at Dalhems IF in Malmö. After that he played for LUGI HF, one of the most prominent Swedish clubs at the time.

As a professional player he represented Caja Cantabria in the Spanish elite league.

== Olympics ==
In 1984, he was a member of the Swedish handball team which finished fifth in the Olympic tournament. He played three matches.

Four years later he was part of the Swedish team which finished fifth again in the Olympic tournament of the 1988 Olympics. He played all six matches.

At the 1992 Games he won the silver medal with the Swedish team. He played all seven matches.

His last Olympic appearance was at the Atlanta Games in 1996 when he won his second silver medal with the Swedish team. He played six matches.

== Coaching career ==
After his professional retirement he switched to a civilian career in the private sector before, once again, returning to Caja Cantabria, this time as general manager for the club.

In 2005, Olsson became manager for the Portugal men's national handball team. The same year he signed a three-year deal with the Norwegian handball association, as a head coach for the Norwegian women's goalkeepers.

On 14 January 2018, Olsson was appointed as a member of the Commission of Coaching and Methods of International Handball Federation by the IHF Council in its meeting held in Zagreb (Croatia) on the fringes of the 2018 European Men's Handball Championship.

He's been the goalkeeping coach for Swedish men's national handball team between 2014 and 2021. As of 2021 he is still goalkeeping coach for the Norwegian women's national team, and for Elverum Håndball.

=== Player clubs ===
- Sweden Dalhems IF
- Sweden LUGI HF
- Spain GD Teka
- Sweden Ystads IF
- Spain Caja Cantabria

=== Coaching teams ===
- Spain Caja Cantabria
- Portugal Portugal men's national handball team
- Norway Norway women's national handball team
- Sweden Sweden men's national handball team
- Norway Elverum Håndball

== Resume ==
- Caps/Goals: 294/2 (1979–1997)
- World champion 1990 (in Prague, Czechoslovakia)
- European champion 1994
- World champion runner up 1997, in Kumamoto, Japan
- Twice olympic silver medalist: Barcelona (1992) and Atlanta (1996)
- 3rd place in the 1993 and 1995 World championships
- Participated in four Summer Olympics: Los Angeles (1984), Seoul (1988), Barcelona (1992) and Atlanta (1996)
- EHF Hall of Fame in 2024
