= Denis Lathoud =

French handball player (1966–2025)

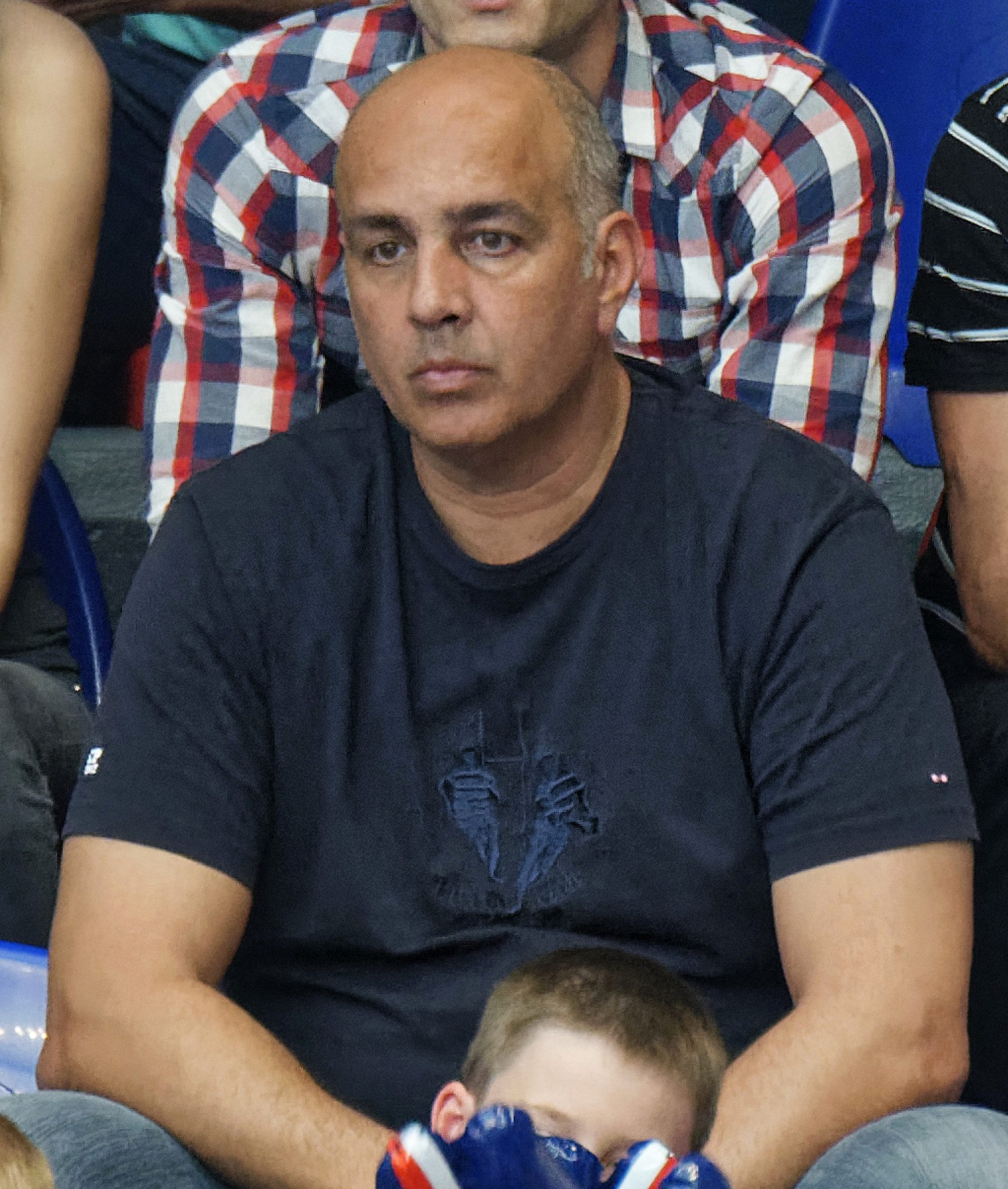
- Lathoud (2015)

Personal information
- Nationality: French
- Born: 13 January 1966 Lyon, France
- Died: 21 June 2025 (aged 59)
- Height: 1.98 m (6 ft 6 in)

Sport
- Sport: Handball
- Position: Left back

Youth career
- Years: Team
- –: Rhodia Club Handball

Senior clubs
- Years: Team
- 1984–1992: Vénissieux Handball
- 1992–1994: USAM Nîmes
- 1994–1997: PSG-Asnières
- 1997–1998: US Ivry
- 1998–1999: Marseille OM 13 CR
- 1999–2000: HBC Villefranche
- 2000: Al Sadd
- 2000–2001: SSV Forst Brixen
- 2001–2005: SMV Porte Normande
National team
Years	Team	Apps	(Gls)
1987–1996	France	164	(463)

Teams managed
- 2002–2005: SMV Porte Normande
- 2005–2006: CAPO Limoges
- 2006–2014: Dijon Bourgogne HB
- 2015–2017: ES Tunis
- 2019–2022: Strasbourg Eurométropole Handball
- 2023–2025: US La Crau
Medal record
Olympics
Bronze medal – third place	1992 Barcelona
World Championship
Silver medal – second place	1993 Sweden
Gold medal – first place	1995 Iceland

Denis Lathoud (13 January 1966 – 21 June 2025) was a French handball player and coach, who as a player won the 1995 World Championship; the first ever French gold medals at a major international tournament. He also competed in the 1992 Summer Olympics and in the 1996 Summer Olympics.

In 1992, he was a member of the French handball team which won the bronze medal. He played all seven matches and scored 25 goals.

Four years later, he finished fourth with the French team in the 1996 Olympic tournament. He played six matches and scored 15 goals.

With USAM Nîmes, he won the French Championship twice.

In December 2002, he became the player-coach at SMV Porte Normande. In the 2005-06 season, he coached CAPO Limoges. From 2006 to 2014, he was the coach at Dijon Bourgogne HB.

Lathoud died of blood cancer on 21 June 2025, at the age of 59.
