= Aleksey Frantsuzov =

Russian handball player

Personal information
- Full name: Aleksey Alekseyevich Frantsuzov
- Nationality: Russia
- Born: 16 October 1971 (age 55) Chelyabinsk, USSR
- Height: 199 cm (78 in)

Sport
- Sport: Handball
- Position: Left back

Youth career
- Years: Team
- 1983-1988: MBU SSCHOR No 13 Chelyabinsk
- 1988-1990: Polet Sports Club

Senior clubs
- Years: Team
- 1990-1997: Polet Sports Club
- 1996-1997: → VfL Bad Schwartau (loan)
- 1997-1998: BM Ciudad Real
- 1998-?: Bidasoa Irun
- –: BM Los Barrios
National team
Years	Team	Apps
–	Russia	80
Medal record
Men's handball
Representing Russia
World Championships
Gold medal – first place	1993 Sweden	Team

Aleksey Alekseyevich Frantsuzov (Алексей Алексеевич Французов, born 16 October 1971) is a Russian male handball player. He was a member of the Russia men's national handball team, with whom he won the 1993 World Championship. He was also part of the team at the 1996 Summer Olympics, playing one match.

== Club career ==
He started playing handball aged 12 at a youth sports school in his hometown Chelyabinsk. His first top level club was Polet Sports Club in Russia, where he finished second in the 1993 Russian Handball Super League as his best result. In December 1996 he joined the German 2nd tier club VfL Bad Schwartau on loan for the rest of the season. After coming back from loan, he joined the Spanish club BM Ciudad Real. After a season in Spain he joined Bidasoa. He retired in 2005 after playing for the lower league club BM Los Barrios.

He played 80 matches for the Russian national team. He became a world champion in 1993, when Russia beat Sweden in the final. Additionally, in 1995 he won the Supercup Tournament.
