= Stéphane Stoecklin =

French handball player (born 1969)

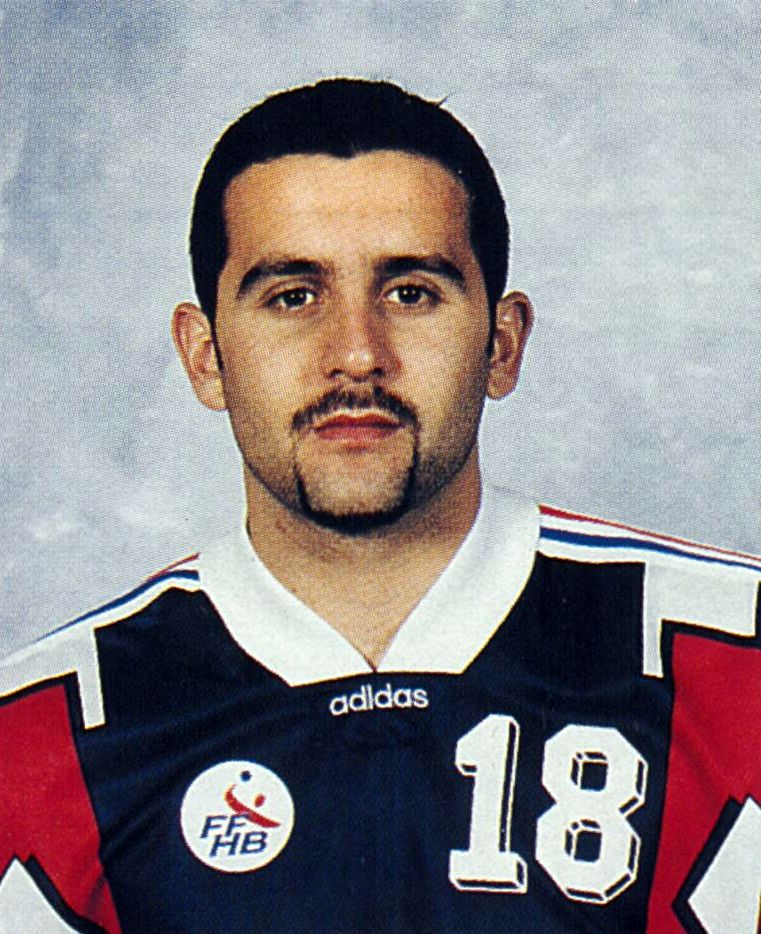
- Stéphane Stoecklin in 1996

Personal information
- Nationality: French
- Born: 12 January 1969 (age 57) Bourgoin-Jallieu
- Height: 1.85 m (6 ft 1 in)

Sport
- Sport: Handball
- Position: Right back

Senior clubs
- Years: Team
- 1976–1985: CS Bourgoin-Jallieu
- 1985–1988: Chambéry HBC
- 1988–1990: Montpellier Paillade SC
- 1990–1994: USAM Nîmes
- 1994–1996: PSG-Asnières
- 1996–1998: GWD Minden
- 1998–2003: Honda Suzuka
- 2003–2005: Chambéry Savoie HB
National team
| Years | Team | Apps | (Gls) |
| 1990-1999 | France | 238 | (898) |
Medal record
Men's Handball
Representing France
Olympic Games
| Bronze medal – third place | 1992 Barcelona | Team Competition |
World Championships
| Gold medal – first place | 1995 Iceland | Team competition |
| Silver medal – second place | 1993 Sweden | Team competition |
| Bronze medal – third place | 1997 Japan | Team competition |

Stéphane Stoecklin (born 12 January 1969) is a French handball player.

He was voted World Player of the Year 1997 by the International Handball Federation. In April 2023 he was included in the French Handball Hall of Fame.

== National team ==
With the French national team, he won a bronze medal at the 1992 Summer Olympics in Barcelona and the medals at the World Championship: silver in 1993, gold in 1995 and bronze in 1997. In the meanwhile, he has been awarded best right back at the 1996 Summer Olympics in Atlanta.

Aged only 30 he retired from the national team after the 1999 World Cup, where France finished sixth.

== Club career ==
Stoeckling started playing handball at his hometown club CS Bourgoin-Jallieu aged 7. When he was 16 he joined the handball academy of Chambéry HBC in the second tier of French handball, where he made his senior debut.

In 1988 he joined Montpellier HB, who had recently been promoted to the top division. In 1989 he was named French handballer of the year.

In 1990 he joined USAM Nîmes, where he won two French Championship in 1991 and 1993 and one Coupe de France in 1994. He then joined PSG-Aniéres.

In 1996 he joined GWD Minden, where he has been Bundesliga top scorer in 1998. The same year, he decided to go in Japan, as they offered him a wage of 1.5 million franc, double what he was paid in Germany. Here he played 5 seasons for Honda Suzuka and won 5 times the Japan League. In 2003 he returned to France and joined Chambéry Savoie HB, where he played until 2005, where he retired.

== Titles ==
- French Championship
  - Winner: 1991, 1993
  - Second-place: 1996
- French Cup
  - Winner: 1994
- Nationale 2
  - Winner: 1989
- Japanese Championship
  - Winner: 1999, 2000, 2001, 2002, 2003
- Japanese Cup
  - Winner: 1999, 2003
