= Olivier Lambert =

French fencer

Personal information
- Born: 3 May 1971 (age 55) Rennes, France

Sport
- Sport: Fencing

Olivier Lambert (born 3 May 1971) is a French former fencer. He competed in the team foil event at the 1992 Summer Olympics.
