= Jean-Luc Thiébaut =

French handball player (born 1960)

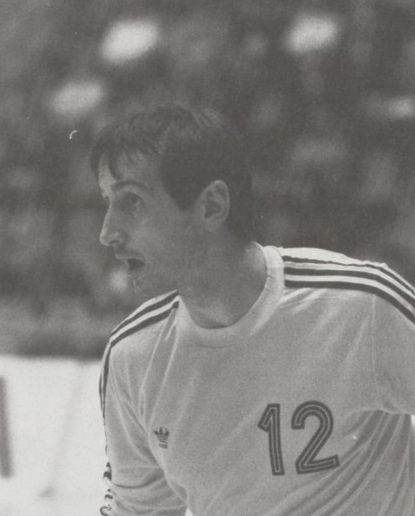
- Jean-Luc Thiébaut (1988)

Personal information
- Full name: Jean-Luc Charles Thiébaut
- Nationality: French
- Born: 29 December 1960 (age 65) Metz, France
- Height: 1.86 m (6 ft 1 in)

Sport
- Sport: Handball
- Position: Goalkeeper
- Current club: Paris 92
- Number: 1

Youth career
- Years: Team
- 1969-1977: Montigny-lès-Metz
- 1977-1979: SMEC Metz

Senior clubs
- Years: Team
- 1979-1981: Paris Université Club
- 1981-1984: Stella Sports Saint-Maur
- 1984-1991: SMEC Metz
- 1991-1994: US Ivry HB
- 1994-1997: SMEC Metz
National team
Years	Team	Apps
1983–1994	France	144
Medal record
Men's Handball
Bronze medal – third place	1992 Barcelona	Team
World Championship
Silver medal – second place	1993 Sweden	Team

Jean-Luc Thiébaut (born 29 December 1960) is a French former handball player who competed in the 1992 Summer Olympics.

He was born in Metz.

In 1992 he was a member of the French handball team which won the bronze medal. He played five matches as goalkeeper. This was the first time ever, that France won a medal at a major international tournament.

In 1993 he was on the French team that won silver medals at the 1993 World Championship.
