= Émmanuel Ducher =

French water polo player (1971–2013)

Personal information
- Nationality: French
- Born: 8 April 1971; Eaubonne, France
- Died: 28 January 2013 (aged 41)

Sport
- Sport: Water polo

Émmanuel Ducher (8 April 1971 – 28 January 2013) was a French water polo player. He competed in the men's tournament at the 1992 Summer Olympics.
