= Nicolas Jeleff =

French water polo player (born 1960)

Personal information
- Nationality: French
- Born: 7 May 1960 (age 66) Paris, France

Sport
- Sport: Water polo

Nicolas Jeleff (born 7 May 1960) is a French water polo player. He competed at the 1988 Summer Olympics and the 1992 Summer Olympics.
