= Marie-Laure Giraudon =

French swimmer

Personal information
- Born: August 27, 1972 (age 53)

Sport
- Sport: Swimming

Marie-Laure Giraudon (born 27 August 1972) is a French former freestyle swimmer who competed in the 1992 Summer Olympics.
