= Audrey Guérit =

French swimmer

Personal information
- Born: March 1, 1976 (age 50)

Sport
- Sport: Swimming
- Strokes: Breaststroke
Medal record
Representing France
Mediterranean Games
Gold medal – first place	1993 Mende	200m breaststroke

Audrey Guérit (born 1 March 1976) is a French former swimmer who competed in the 1992 Summer Olympics.
