= Hagen Bower =

New Zealand table tennis player

Personal information
- Full name: Hagen John Bower
- Nationality: New Zealand
- Born: 10 June 1972 (age 53) Wellington, New Zealand

Sport
- Sport: Table tennis

Hagen John Bower (born 10 June 1972) is a New Zealand former table tennis player. He competed in the men's singles and the men's doubles events at the 1992 Summer Olympics.
