= Gilles Madelenat =

French water polo player (born 1967)

Personal information
- Nationality: French
- Born: 18 February 1967 (age 58); Coutances, France

Sport
- Sport: Water polo

Gilles Madelenat (born 18 February 1967) is a French former water polo player. He competed in the men's tournament at the 1992 Summer Olympics.
