= Christian Grimaldi =

French water polo player (born 1965)

Personal information
- Nationality: French
- Born: 4 September 1965 (age 59); Marseille, France

Sport
- Sport: Water polo

Christian Grimaldi (born 4 September 1965) is a French water polo player. He competed in the men's tournament at the 1992 Summer Olympics.
