= David Romann =

French volleyball player (born 1970)

Personal information
- Nationality: French
- Born: 4 May 1970 (age 54); Mulhouse, France

David Romann (born 4 May 1970) is a French volleyball player. He competed in the men's tournament at the 1992 Summer Olympics.
