= Patrice Tillie =

French water polo player (born 1964)

Personal information
- Nationality: French
- Born: 3 November 1964 (age 60); Algiers, Algeria

Sport
- Sport: Water polo

Patrice Tillie (born 3 November 1964) is a French water polo player. He competed in the men's tournament at the 1992 Summer Olympics.
