= Éric Wolfer =

French volleyball player (born 1966)

Personal information
- Nationality: French
- Born: 27 February 1966 (age 59); Brussels, Belgium

Sport
- Sport: Volleyball

Éric Wolfer (born 27 February 1966) is a French volleyball player. He competed in the men's tournament at the 1992 Summer Olympics.
