= Éric Quintin =

French handball player (born 1967)

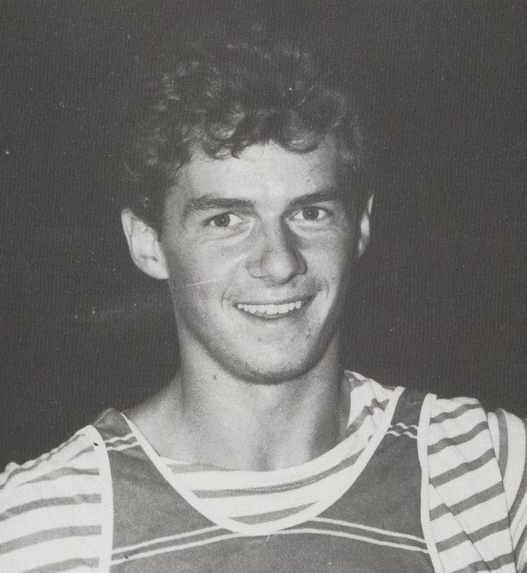
- With his team's jersey.

Personal information
- Nationality: French
- Born: 22 January 1967 (age 59) Aix-en-Provence

Sport
- Sport: Handball
- Position: Left wing

Senior clubs
- Years: Team
- ?-1984: (France) Aix Université Club
- 1984-1991: (France) SMUC Marseille
- 1991-1996: (France) OM-Vitrolles
- 1996-?: (France) Aix Université Club
National team
| Years | Team | Apps |
| 1988–1996 | France | 216 (277) |

Teams managed
- 1996-2006: (France) Aix Université Club
- 2010-2021: France youth
Medal record
Representing France
Olympic Games
| Bronze medal – third place | 1992 Barcelona |
World Championship
| Silver medal – second place | 1993 Sweden |
| Gold medal – first place | 1995 Iceland |
Goodwill Games
| Gold medal – first place | 1994 St-Petersburg |

Éric Quintin (born 22 January 1967) is a French handball player and coach.

== Career ==
=== National team ===
With the French national team, he won the bronze medal at the 1992 Summer Olympics, a silver medal at the 1993 World Championship, a gold medal at the 1994 Goodwill Games and at 1995 World Championship

=== Club career ===
With clubs, he started at his home town club Aix Université Club, before joining for SMUC Marseille who became OM-Vitrolles in 1991. With this club, he won the EHF Cup Winner's Cup, the French league in 1994, 1996 and the Coupe de France: in 1993 and 1995. In 1996 he returned to Aix Université Club as a Player-coach.

== Coaching career ==
From 1996 to 2000 he was the player coach for Aix Université Club, before becoming the full time coach from 2000 to 2006. From 2010 he has been coach of the French youth teams as well as the France men's national beach handball team.

In 2014 he led the French U18 team to the European Men's Junior Handball Championship title with players such as Ludovic Fabregas, Dika Mem and Melvyn Richardson. In 2015 he led the team to the World Men's Junior Handball Championship title.

In 2016 he won the European Junior Championship again with players such as Dylan Nahi and Elohim Prandi, and in 2017 he won his second World Junior title.

He stopped being the French youth coach in 2021 and was replaced by Pascal Person.

== Accomplishments ==
- EHF Cup Winner's Cup:
  - Winner (1): 1993 (as OMV)
  - Runners-up (1): 1994 (as OMV)
- French league:
  - Winner (7): 1965, 1967, 1969, 1975, 1984 (as SMUC) ; 1994, 1996 (as OMV)
  - Runners-up (3): 1983 (as SMUC) ; 1993, 1995 (as OMV)
- Coupe de France:
  - Winner (3): 1976 (as SMUC) ; 1993, 1995 (as OMV)
  - Runners-up (2): 1992, 1996 (as OMV)
