= Pascal Loustenau =

French water polo player (born 1968)

Personal information
- Nationality: French
- Born: 30 October 1968 (age 57) Nice, France

Sport
- Sport: Water polo

Pascal Loustenau (born 30 October 1968) is a French water polo player. He competed in the men's tournament at the 1992 Summer Olympics.
