= Annabel Chaulvin =

French yacht racer

Annabel Chaulvin (born 4 July 1965) is a French yacht racer who competed in the 1992 Summer Olympics and in the 1996 Summer Olympics.
