= Rivomanantsoa Andriamaonju =

French volleyball player (born 1963)

Personal information
- Nationality: French
- Born: 15 May 1963 (age 61); Antananarivo, Madagascar

Sport
- Sport: Volleyball

Rivomanantsoa Andriamaonju (born 15 May 1963) is a French volleyball player. He competed in the men's tournament at the 1992 Summer Olympics.
