= Frédéric Perez =

French handball player (born 1961)

Fréderic Perez
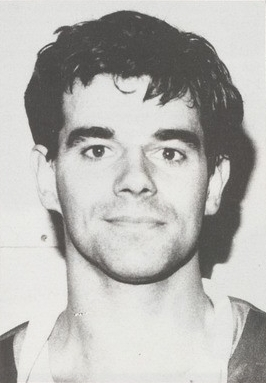
- Fréderic Perez (1986)

Personal information
- Nationality: French
- Born: 19 July 1961 (age 65) Oran, Algeria
- Height: 1.92 m (6 ft 4 in)

Sport
- Sport: Handball
- Position: Goalkeeper

Senior clubs
- Years: Team
- 1979-1982: Thonon AC
- 1982-1984: ES St-Martin-d'Hères
- 1984-1988: Stella Sport Saint-Maur
- 1988-1991: US Créteil HB
- 1991–1994: USM Gagny
- 1994-1997: Sporting Toulouse 31
National team
Years	Team	Apps
1986-1997	France	130

Teams managed
- 2001 - ?: Spacer’s Toulouse (GK coach)
- 2013 - ?: France women (GK coach)
Medal record
Men's Handball
Bronze medal – third place	1992 Barcelona	Team

Frédéric Perez (born July 19, 1961 in Oran, French Algeria) is a French handball coach and former player who competed in the 1992 Summer Olympics.

He played handball for the French team that won the bronze medal in 1992. He participated in five games as the keeper.

== Career ==
He played for the French clubs Thonon AC, ES St-Martin-d'Hères and Stella Sport Saint-Maur. In 1988 he joined US Créteil HB where he won the 1989 French championship and French Cup.

In 1991 he joined USM Gagny. In 1994 he joined Sporting Toulouse 31 in the second tier. In 1997 he retired and became a goalkeeper coach at the club and the France women's national handball team.

He debuted for the French national team in 1986 and played 130 matches for the national team over the course of his career.
