= Frédéric Volle =

French handball player (born 1966)

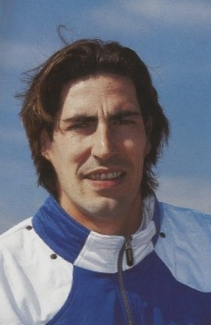
- Frédéric Volle (1994)

Personal information
- Nationality: French
- Born: 4 February 1966 (age 60) Montpellier, France
- Height: 196 cm (77 in)

Sport
- Sport: Handball
- Position: Left back

Youth career
- Years: Team
- 1980-1984: USAM Nîmes

Senior clubs
- Years: Team
- 1984-1992: USAM Nîmes
- 1992-1996: OM Vitrolles
- 1996-1998: SG Wallau-Massenheim
- 1998-2002: Honda Suzuka
- 2002-2004: Honda Kumamoto
National team
Years	Team	Apps	(Gls)
1984–1996	France	297	(739)

Teams managed
- 2002-?: Japan
- 2004-2005: SG Kronau/Östringen
Medal record
Men's Handball
Bronze medal – third place	1992 Barcelona	Team
World Championships
Gold medal – first place	1995 Iceland
Silver medal – second place	1993 Sweden

Frédéric Volle (born 4 February 1966 in Montpellier) is a French former handball player. He was part of the French national team that won the 1995 World Championship, beating Croatia in the final. He also competed in the 1992 Summer Olympics and in the 1996 Summer Olympics.

== Career ==
Volle started his career at USAM Nîmes. In 1989 he was the top scorer in the French league. In 1992 he moved on to OM Vitrolles. Here he won the 1993 EHF Cup Winners' Cup. In 1996 he joined German team SG Wallau-Massenheim before playing the last years of his career in Japan, where he won the Japanese championship four times in a row.

In 1992, Volle was a member of the French handball team which won bronze medal at the 1992 Olympics. This was France's first ever medal at major international tournament. He played all seven matches and scored 23 goals.

Four years later, Volle finished fourth with the French team in the 1996 Olympic tournament. He played seven games and scored numerous goals. He was the second highest scorer. Volle also has a silver from 1993 World Championship in Sweden, Stolkholm, where France lost to Russia in the final.

In the 2004–2005 season he was the coach for the German club SG Kronau/Östringen. He was replaced midway through the season by Rolf Bechtold, who coached the team to promotion to the Handball-Bundesliga, by finishing second in the 2nd Bundesliga.

== Titles ==
- French Championship:
  - Winner: 1988, 1990, 1991, 1994, 1996
- French Cup:
  - Winner: 1985, 1986, 1993, 1995
- EHF Cup Winners' Cup
  - Winner: 1993
- Japanese Championship
  - Winner: 1999, 2000, 2001, 2002
- Japanese Cup
  - Winner: 1999

== See also ==
- List of men's handballers with 1000 or more international goals
