= Gaël Monthurel =

French handball player (born 1966)

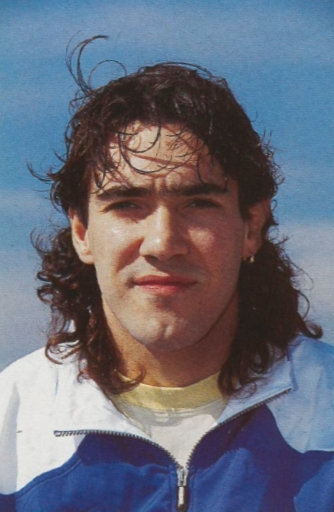
- Gaël Monthurel (1994)

Personal information
- Full name: Fabrice Gabriel Monthurel
- Nationality: French
- Born: 22 January 1966 (age 60) Conches-en-Ouche, Eure, France
- Height: 1.83 m (6 ft 0 in)

Sport
- Sport: Handball
- Position: Pivot

Youth career
- Years: Team
- 1979-1985: Conches

Senior clubs
- Years: Team
- 1985-1987: ESM Gonfreville l'Orcher
- 1987-1993: Vénissieux Handball
- 1993-1995: USM Gagny
- 1995-1998: PSG-Asnières
National team
Years	Team	Apps	(Gls)
1987-1996	France	253	(292)

Teams managed
- 1998-?: US Saintes HB
- 2002-12/2005: Gonfreville l’Orcher
- 2006-?: Bourgoin-Jallieu
- 2008-2010: ES Falaise Calvados
- 2010-2012: CO Vernouillet
- 2012-2015: El Jaish SC
- 2015-2016: HBC Bressuire
- 2016-2017: Bergerac Périgord Pourpre Handball
- 2017-2018: HBC Bressuire
Medal record
World Championship
Gold medal – first place	1995 Iceland
Olympic Games
Bronze medal – third place	1992 Barcelona	Team

Gaël Monthurel (born 22 January 1966) is a French handball coach and former player who was part of the French team that won the 1995 World Championship; the first time ever France won a major international tournament. He also competed in the 1992 Summer Olympics and in the 1996 Summer Olympics.

== Career ==
With Vénissieux Handball he won the French Championship in 1992 and the 1991 and 1992 Coupe de France. He later played for USM Gagny and PSG-Asnières

In 1992 he was a member of the French team which won bronze medals at the 1992 Olympics. This was the first time ever, France won a medal at any major international tournament. He played three matches and scored four goals.

Four years later he finished fourth with the French team in the 1996 Olympic tournament. He played four matches and scored three goals.

== Coaching ==
In 1998 he took over at the French team US Saintes HB. Later he coached Gonfreville l'Orcher, Bourgoin-Jallieu, ES Falaise Calvados and CO Vernouillet.

In 2012 he joined the coaching staff at the Qatari club El Jaish SC.
