= Pascal Mahé =

French handball player (born 1963)

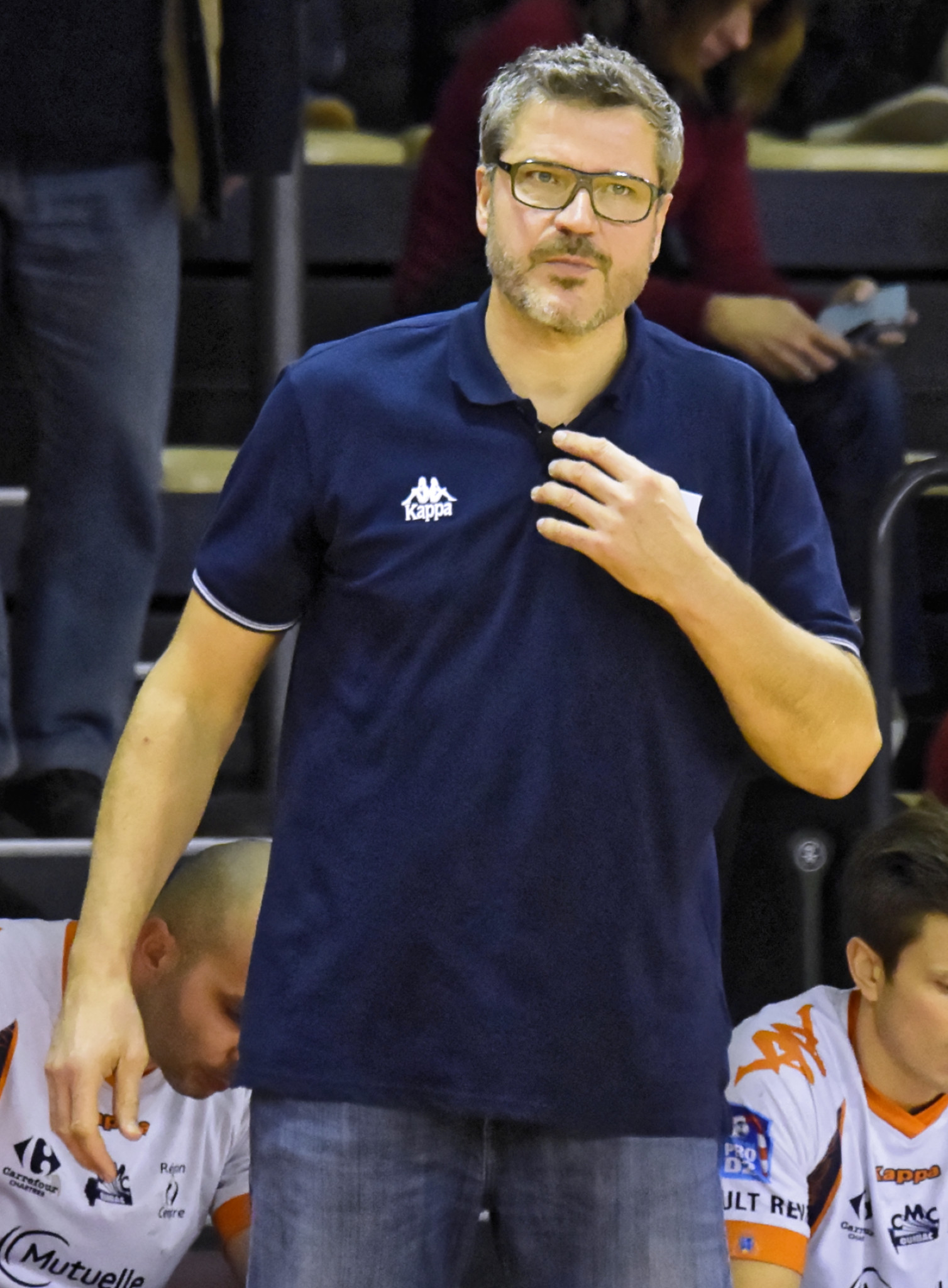
- Pascal Mahé (2014)

Personal information
- Nationality: French
- Born: 15 December 1963 (age 62) Saint-Martin-de-May, France
- Height: 195 cm (77 in)

Sport
- Sport: Handball
- Position: Centre back

Youth career
- Years: Team
- –1982: ASPTT Caen

Senior clubs
- Years: Team
- 1982–1985: Paris UC
- 1985–1992: US Créteil
- 1992–1996: Montpellier Handball
- 1996–1999: Association sportive de Monaco
- 1999–2003: TSV Bayer Dormagen
National team
Years	Team	Apps	(Gls)
1984–1996	France	297	(739)

Teams managed
- 1997–1999: Association Sportive de Monaco
- 1999–2013: TSV Bayer Dormagen reserves
- 2013–2015: Chartres MHB
- 2018–2019: Caen Handball
- 2019–2023 (U18): Caen Handball
Medal record
Olympic Games
Bronze medal – third place	1992 Barcelona	Team
World Championships
Silver medal – second place	1993 Sweden	Team
Gold medal – first place	1995 Iceland	Team

Pascal Mahé (born 15 December 1963, in Saint-Martin-de-May) is a French former handball player and current coach. As a player he won the 1995 World Championship; the first ever gold medal for France in a major international tournament. He also competed in the 1992 Summer Olympics and in the 1996 Summer Olympics.

== Career ==
At club level he won the French Championship twice, once with US Créteil Handball and once with Montpellier Handball.

In 1992, Mahé was a member of the French handball team that won the bronze medal. He played six matches and scored twelve goals.

Four years later, Mahé finished fourth with the French team in the 1996 Olympic tournament. He played four matches and scored two goals.

== Private life ==
His son, Kentin Mahé, is also a handball player for the French national team.
