= SMUC Marseille =

French handball club

- Full name: Stade Marseillais Université Club
- Founded: 1941; 84 years ago, recreated from OM Virtrolles 1994; 31 years ago
- Arena: Palais des sports de Marseille; Stadium de Vitrolles
- Capacity: 5800; 5000
- President: Dominique Tésorière
- Head coach: -
- League: -
- Club colours
| Home | Away |

Stade Marseillais Université Club Handball, often just called SMUC Marseille, is a team handball club from Marseille, France. Currently, SMUC Marseille competes in the French First League of Handball.

Between 1989 and 1996 the team was called OM Vitrolles, and acted as a part of the broader sports club Olympique de Marseille and was economically supported by them. When Olympique de Marsille was involved in the bribing scandal Affaire VA-OM, it affected the handball team, and the players began to strike, as they were not getting paid. The team was administratively relegated to the French third tier in 1996, as they could not pay there 3 million Franc debt. Afterwards the team returned to be Stade Marseillais Université Club Handball again.

== Accomplishments ==
- EHF Cup Winner's Cup:
  - Winner (1): 1993 (as OMV)
  - Runners-up (1): 1994 (as OMV)
- French league:
  - Winner (7): 1965, 1967, 1969, 1975, 1984 (as SMUC); 1994, 1996 (as OMV)
  - Runners-up (3): 1983 (as SMUC); 1993, 1995 (as OMV)
- Coupe de France:
  - Winner (3): 1976 (as SMUC); 1993, 1995 (as OMV)
  - Runners-up (2): 1992, 1996 (as OMV)

== Famous former players ==
- (France) Phillippe Gardent
- (France) Thierry Perreux
- (France) Jackson Richardson
- (France) Éric Amalou
- (France) Frédéric Volle
- (France) Éric Quintin
- (Croatia) Mirko Bašić
- (Serbia) Zoran Đorđić
- (Serbia) Mile Isaković
- (Serbia) Slobodan Kuzmanovski
- (France) Philippe Julia
