= Philippe Gardent (handballer) =

French handball player (born 1964)

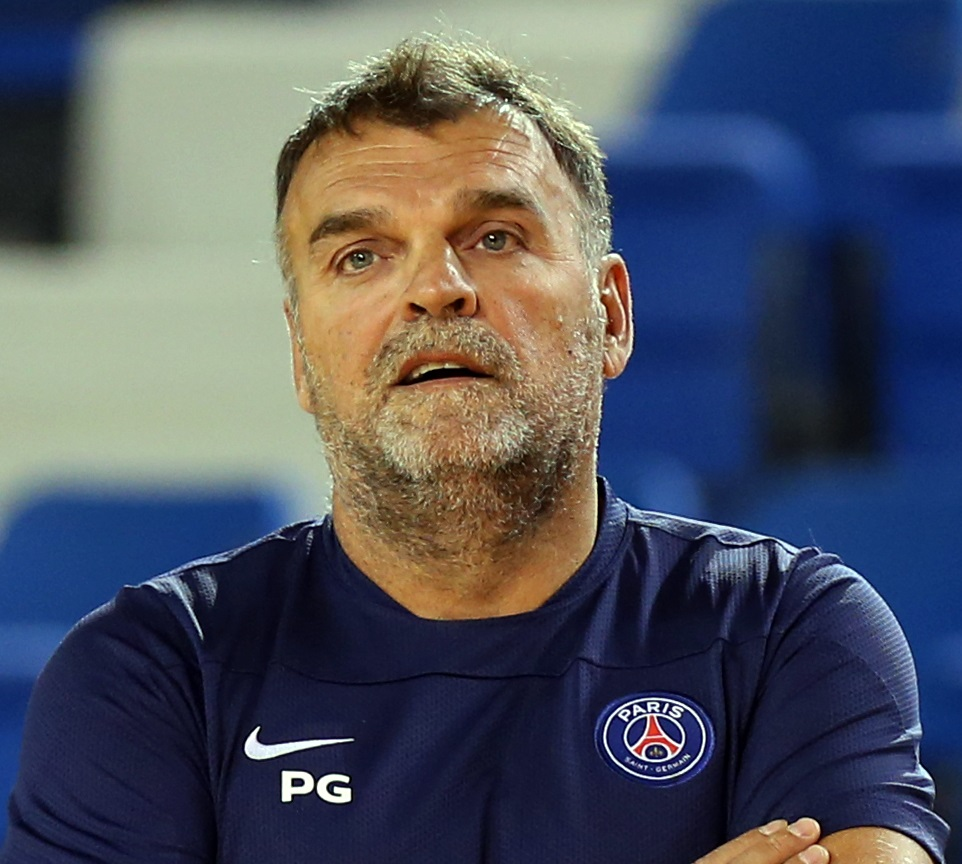
- Gardent coaching PSG in 2013

Personal information
- Nationality: French
- Born: 15 March 1964 (age 62) Belleville, Rhône, France
- Height: 184 cm (72 in)

Sport
- Sport: Handball
- Position: Pivot

Senior clubs
- Years: Team
- –1982: Stade français
- 1982–1985: Paris Université Club
- 1985–1990: USM Gagny
- 1990–1992: USAM Nîmes
- 1992–1996: OM Vitrolles
National team
Years	Team	Apps	(Gls)
1983–1996	France	298	(635)

Teams managed
- 1996–2012: Chambéry Savoie
- 2012–2015: Paris Saint-Germain
- 2015–2021: Fenix Toulouse
Medal record
Representing France
Olympic Games
Bronze medal – third place	1992 Barcelona	Team
World Championship
Silver medal – second place	1993 Sweden	Team
Gold medal – first place	1995 Iceland	Team

Philippe Gardent (born 15 March 1964) is a French handball player who was the captain of the French teams that won the World Championship in 1995 and placed second in 1993. He also won a bronze medal at the 1992 Olympics. He played six matches and scored 16 goals. Since retiring from competitions in 1996 he worked as a handball coach, with Chambéry Savoie Handball (1996–2012), Paris Saint-Germain Handball (2012–2015) and Fenix Toulouse Handball (since 2015).
