= Handball at the 1992 Summer Olympics – Men's team squads =

List of handball players

The following squads and players competed in the men's handball tournament at the 1992 Summer Olympics.

== Brazil ==
The following players represented Brazil:

- José Luiz Aguiar e Ramalho
- Sérgio Carnasciali
- Drean Dutra
- Milton Fonseca Pelissari
- Rodrigo Hoffelder
- Osvaldo Inocente Filho
- Gilberto Cardoso
- José Luiz Vieira
- Ivan Bruno Maziero
- Marcelo Minhoto Ferraz de Sampaio
- Paulo Moratore
- José Ronaldo do Nascimento
- Cláudio Brito
- Edson Rizzo

Head coach

- Antonio Carlos Simões

== Czechoslovakia ==
The following players represented Czechoslovakia:

- Bohumír Prokop
- Ján Sedláček
- Ľubomír Švajlen
- Ľuboš Hudák
- Martin Šetlík
- Michal Tonar
- Milan Folta
- Petr Házl
- Peter Kakaščík
- Peter Kalafut
- Peter Mesiarik
- Petr Baumruk
- Roman Bečvář
- Václav Lanča
- Zdeněk Vaněk
- Zoltán Bergendi

Head coach

- Frantisek Sulc

== Egypt ==
The following players represented Egypt:

- Hosam Abdallah
- Ayman Abdel Hamid Soliman
- Mohamed Abdel Mohamed
- Ahmed Belal
- Ahmed Debes
- Ahmed El-Attar
- Ahmed El-Awady
- Aser El-Kasaby
- Khaled El-Kordy
- Adel El-Sharkawy
- Ashraf Mabrouk Awaad
- Yasser Mahmoud
- Gohar Nabil
- Amer Serageldin

Head coach

- Paul Tiedemann

== France ==
The following players represented France:

- Philippe Debureau
- Philippe Gardent
- Denis Lathoud
- Pascal Mahé
- Philippe Médard
- Gaël Monthurel
- Laurent Munier
- Frédéric Perez
- Alain Portes
- Thierry Perreux
- Éric Quintin
- Jackson Richardson
- Stéphane Stoecklin
- Jean-Luc Thiébaut
- Denis Tristant
- Frédéric Volle

Head coach

- Daniel Costantini

== Germany ==
The following players represented Germany:

- Andreas Thiel
- Bernd Roos
- Frank-Michael Wahl
- Hendrik Ochel
- Holger Schneider
- Holger Winselmann
- Jan Holpert
- Jochen Fraatz
- Klaus-Dieter Petersen
- Matthias Hahn
- Michael Klemm
- Michael Krieter
- Richard Ratka
- Stephan Hauck
- Volker Zerbe
- Wolfgang Schwenke

Head coach

- Horst Bredemeier

== Hungary ==
The following players represented Hungary:

- Attila Borsos
- Attila Horváth
- Ferenc Füzesi
- Igor Zubjuk
- Imre Bíró
- István Csoknyai
- Jakab Sibalin
- János Szathmári
- József Éles
- László Marosi
- László Sótonyi
- Mihály Iváncsik
- Ottó Csicsay
- Richárd Mezei
- Sándor Győrffy

Head coach

- Attila Joósz

== Iceland ==
The following players represented Iceland:

- Bergsveinn Bergsveinsson
- Birgir Sigurðsson
- Einar Sigurðsson
- Geir Sveinsson
- Guðmundur Hrafnkelsson
- Gunnar Andrésson
- Gunnar Gunnarsson
- Héðinn Gilsson
- Jakob Sigurðsson
- Júlíus Jónasson
- Konráð Ólavsson
- Patrekur Jóhannesson
- Sigurður Bjarnason
- Valdimar Grímsson

Head coach

- Þorbergur Aðalsteinsson

== Romania ==
The following players represented Romania:

- Adi Popovici
- Alexandru Dedu
- Alexandru Buligan
- Costica Neagu
- Dumitru Berbece
- Sorin Toacsen
- Gheorghe Răduţă
- Rudi Prisăcaru
- Ion Mocanu
- Marian Dumitru
- Maricel Voinea
- Mitică Bontaş
- Robert Licu
- Cristian Zaharia
- Ionel Radu

Head coach

- Cezar Nica

== South Korea ==
The following players represented South Korea:

- Jo Beom-yeon
- Jo Chi-hyo
- Jo Yeong-sin
- Choi Seok-jae
- Jeong Gang-uk
- Gang Jae-won
- Lee Gi-ho
- Lee Gyu-chang
- Lee Seon-sun
- Im Jin-seok
- Mun Byeong-uk
- Baek Sang-seo
- Park Do-heon
- Sim Jae-hong
- Yun Gyeong-sin

Head coach

- Lee Kyu-Jung

== Spain ==
The following players represented Spain:

- Aitor Etxaburu
- Alberto Urdiales
- Aleix Franch
- Angel Hermida
- David Barrufet
- Enric Massip
- Fernando Bolea
- Iñaki Urdangarín
- Jaume Fort
- Juan Francisco Alemany
- Juan Javier Cabanas
- Juan Francisco Muñoz
- Lorenzo Rico
- Luis Eduardo García
- Mateo Garralda
- Ricardo Marín

Head coach

- Javier García Cuesta

== Sweden ==
The following players represented Sweden:

- Magnus Andersson
- Robert Andersson
- Anders Bäckegren
- Per Carlén
- Magnus Cato
- Erik Hajas
- Robert Hedin
- Patrik Liljestrand
- Ola Lindgren
- Mats Olsson
- Staffan Olsson
- Axel Sjöblad
- Tommy Suoraniemi
- Tomas Svensson
- Pierre Thorsson
- Magnus Wislander

Head coach

- Bengt Johansson

== Unified Team ==
The following players represented the Unified Team:

- Andrey Barbashinsky
- Serhiy Bebeshko
- Igor Chumak
- Talant Duyshebaev
- Dmitry Filippov
- Yuriy Gavrilov
- Valery Gopin
- Vyacheslav Gorpishin
- Oleg Grebnev
- Oleg Kiselyov
- Vasily Kudinov
- Andrey Lavrov
- Andrey Minevski
- Pavel Sukosyan
- Igor Vasilev
- Mikhail Yakimovich

Head coach

- Spartak Mironovich
