= Iceland at the 1992 Summer Olympics =

- IOC code: ISL
- NOC: Olympic Committee of Iceland

in Barcelona
- Competitors: 27 (24 men and 3 women) in 6 sports
- Flag bearer: Bjarni Friðriksson
- Medals: Gold 0 Silver 0 Bronze 0 Total 0

Summer Olympics appearances (overview)
- 1908; 1912; 1920–1932; 1936; 1948; 1952; 1956; 1960; 1964; 1968; 1972; 1976; 1980; 1984; 1988; 1992; 1996; 2000; 2004; 2008; 2012; 2016; 2020; 2024; 2028

Iceland competed at the 1992 Summer Olympics in Barcelona, Spain.

== Competitors ==
The following is the list of number of competitors in the Games.

Sport	Men	Women	Total
Athletics	4	0	4
Badminton	2	1	3
Handball	14	0	14
Judo	3	0	3
Shooting	1	0	1
Swimming	0	2	2
Total	24	3	27

== Athletics ==
Key

- Note–Ranks given for track events are within the athlete's heat only
- Q = Qualified for the next round
- q = Qualified for the next round as a fastest loser or, in field events, by position without achieving the qualifying target
- NR = National record
- N/A = Round not applicable for the event
- Bye = Athlete not required to compete in round

Men
Field events

Athlete	Event	Qualification		Final	
Athlete	Event	Distance	Position	Distance	Position
Pétur Guðmundsson	Shot put	19.15	14	did not advance	
Vésteinn Hafsteinsson	Discus throw	60.20	12 q	60.06	11
Sigurður Einarsson	Javelin throw	79.50	11 q	80.34	5
Einar Vilhjálmsson	Javelin throw	78.70	14	did not advance	

== Badminton ==
Athlete	Event	Round of 64	Round of 32	Round of 16	Quarterfinal	Semifinal	Final / BM	
Athlete	Event	Opposition Score	Opposition Score	Opposition Score	Opposition Score	Opposition Score	Opposition Score	Rank
Árni Þór Hallgrímsson	Men's singles	Kriel (RSA); W (15–8, 15–7)	Kim (KOR); L (7–15, 14–18)	Did not advance				
Broddi Kristjánsson	Men's singles	Chiangta (THA); L (2–15, 12–15)	Did not advance					
Elsa Nielsen	Women's singles	Bisht (IND); L (4–11, 2–11)	Did not advance					
Árni Þór Hallgrímsson; Broddi Kristjánsson	Men's doubles	—N/a	Chan / Ng (HKG); L (15–12, 6–15, 12–15)	Did not advance				

== Handball ==
Summary

Key:

- ET: After extra time
- P – Match decided by penalty-shootout.

Team	Event	Group stage						Semifinal	Final / BM	
Team	Event	Opposition Score	Opposition Score	Opposition Score	Opposition Score	Opposition Score	Rank	Opposition Score	Opposition Score	Rank
Iceland men's	Men's tournament	Brazil; W 19–18	Czechoslovakia; D 16–16	Hungary; W 22–16	South Korea; W 26–24	Sweden; L 18–25	2 Q	Unified Team; L 19–23	France; L 20–24	4

=== Men's tournament ===
The Icelandic handball team had a difficult time getting to the 1992 Summer Olympics. Due to the Yugoslavian civil war and the exclusion of the Yugoslavian team from the event, Iceland received a late ticket to the Barcelona Games. With a short preparation, the team was not favored going into the Olympics, but ended up in the semi-finals. They ended up in fourth place; Kristján Arason played on the Icelandic team.

- Team roster

- Gunnar Andrésson
- Bergsveinn Bergsveinsson
- Gústaf Bjarnason
- Sigurður Bjarnason
- Héðinn Gilsson
- Valdimar Grímsson
- Gunnar Gunnarsson
- Guðmundur Hrafnkelsson
- Patrekur Jóhannesson
- Júlíus Jónasson
- Konráð Olavsson
- Sigmar Óskarsson
- Birgir Sigurðsson
- Einar Sigurðsson
- Jakob Sigurðsson
- Geir Sveinsson

- Head coach: Þorbergur Aðalsteinsson

Group play

Pos	Team	Pld	W	D	L	GF	GA	GD	Pts	Qualification
1	Sweden	5	5	0	0	120	86	+34	10	Semifinals
2	Iceland	5	3	1	1	101	99	+2	7	Semifinals
3	South Korea	5	3	0	2	114	117	−3	6	Fifth place game
4	Hungary	5	2	0	3	102	108	−6	4	Seventh place game
5	Czechoslovakia	5	1	1	3	94	92	+2	3	Ninth place game
6	Brazil	5	0	0	5	96	125	−29	0	Eleventh place game

27 July 1992; 14:30	Iceland	19–18	Brazil	Palau d'Esports de Granollers, Granollers; Referees: Gallego, Lamas (ESP)
27 July 1992; 14:30	Jónasson 6	(10–10)	Nascimento 5	Palau d'Esports de Granollers, Granollers; Referees: Gallego, Lamas (ESP)

29 July 1992; 20:30	Czechoslovakia	16–16	Iceland	Palau d'Esports de Granollers, Granollers; Referees: Guterman (LTU), Taranukhin (RUS)
29 July 1992; 20:30	Bergendi 4	(9–9)	Grímsson 4	Palau d'Esports de Granollers, Granollers; Referees: Guterman (LTU), Taranukhin (RUS)

31 July 1992; 14:30	Iceland	22–16	Hungary	Palau d'Esports de Granollers, Granollers; Referees: Lelong, Tancrez (FRA)
31 July 1992; 14:30	Grímsson 6		Marosi 4	Palau d'Esports de Granollers, Granollers; Referees: Lelong, Tancrez (FRA)

2 August 1992; 10:00	Iceland	26–24	South Korea	Palau d'Esports de Granollers, Granollers; Referees: Rudin, Schill (SUI)
2 August 1992; 10:00	Grímsson 8	(11–14)	Cho C. 9	Palau d'Esports de Granollers, Granollers; Referees: Rudin, Schill (SUI)

4 August 1992; 20:30	Sweden	25–18	Iceland	Palau d'Esports de Granollers, Granollers; Referees: Christensen, Jørgensen (DEN)
4 August 1992; 20:30	Carlén 8	(12–7)	Sveinsson 5	Palau d'Esports de Granollers, Granollers; Referees: Christensen, Jørgensen (DEN)

Semifinal

6 August 1992; 21:00	Iceland	19–23	Unified Team	Palau d'Esports de Granollers, Granollers; Referees: Thomas, Thomas (GER)
6 August 1992; 21:00	Grímsson 6	(9–11)	Dujshebaev 9	Palau d'Esports de Granollers, Granollers; Referees: Thomas, Thomas (GER)

Bronze medal match

8 August 1992; 15:00	Iceland	20–24	France	Palau Sant Jordi, Barcelona; Referees: Guterman (LTU), Taranukhin (RUS)
8 August 1992; 15:00	Grímsson 5	(9–12)	Munier 6	Palau Sant Jordi, Barcelona; Referees: Guterman (LTU), Taranukhin (RUS)

== Judo ==
Men

Athlete	Event	Round of 64	Round of 32	Round of 16	Quarterfinals	Semifinals	Repechage			Final	
Athlete	Event	Round of 64	Round of 32	Round of 16	Quarterfinals	Semifinals	Round 1	Round 2	Round 3	Final	
Athlete	Event	Opposition Result	Opposition Result	Opposition Result	Opposition Result	Opposition Result	Opposition Result	Opposition Result	Opposition Result	Opposition Result	Rank
Freyr Gauti Sigmundsson	78 kg	Dorjbat (MGL); L Ippon	Did not advance								
Bjarni Friðriksson	95 kg	Bye	Traineau (FRA); L Ippon	Did not advance							
Sigurður Bergmann	+95 kg	—N/a	Moreno (CUB); L Ippon	Did not advance							

== Shooting ==
Men

Athlete	Event	Qualification		Final	
Athlete	Event	Points	Rank	Points	Rank
Carl Eiríksson	50 metre rifle prone	583	50	Did not advance	

== Swimming ==
Women

Athlete	Event	Heat		Semifinal		Final	
Athlete	Event	Time	Rank	Time	Rank	Time	Rank
Helga Sigurðardóttir	50 m freestyle	27.94	42	did not advance			
Helga Sigurðardóttir	100 m freestyle	1:00.29	40	did not advance			
Ragnheiður Runólfsdóttir	100 m breaststroke	1:12.14	19	did not advance			
Ragnheiður Runólfsdóttir	200 m breaststroke	2:37.42	27	did not advance			
