= 1994 European Men's Handball Championship =

1994 edition of the European Men's Handball Championship

Tournament details
- Host country: Portugal
- Venues: 2 (in 2 host cities)
- Dates: 3–12 June
- Teams: 12 (from 1 confederation)

Final positions
- Champions: Sweden (1st title)
- Runners-up: Russia
- Third place: Croatia
- Fourth place: Denmark

Tournament statistics
- Matches played: 38
- Goals scored: 1,746 (45.95 per match)
- Top scorer: Vasily Kudinov (RUS) (50 goals)

Awards
- Best player: Magnus Andersson (SWE)

The 1994 European Men's Handball Championship was the inaugural edition of the tournament, held in Portugal from 3 to 12 June 1994, in the cities of Porto and Almada.

Sweden won the tournament after defeating Russia in the final 34–21, Russia's heaviest loss in their international history, while Croatia captured the bronze medal after defeating Denmark while the hosts Portugal finished last (12th).

== Teams ==
Group A	Group B
Croatia	Denmark
Belarus	Hungary
Romania	Portugal
Russia	Sweden
France	Spain
Germany	Slovenia

== Venues ==
City	Stadium	Capacity
Almada	Complexo Desportivo de Almada	4.000
Porto	Pavilhão Rosa Mota	5.400

== Preliminary round ==
All times are local (UTC+1).

=== Group A ===
Pos	Team	Pld	W	D	L	GF	GA	GD	Pts	Qualification
1	Russia	5	5	0	0	122	94	+28	10	Semifinals
2	Croatia	5	3	0	2	120	114	+6	6	Semifinals
3	France	5	2	1	2	123	120	+3	5	Fifth place game
4	Belarus	5	2	0	3	130	139	−9	4	Seventh place game
5	Germany	5	1	1	3	107	113	−6	3	Ninth place game
6	Romania	5	1	0	4	113	135	−22	2	Eleventh place game

Source: EHF

3 June 1994; 15:30	Germany	23–24	Belarus	Complexo Desportivo de Almada, Almada; Attendance: 1,000; Referees: Gallego, Lamas (ESP)
3 June 1994; 15:30	Zerbe 6	(12–10)	Yakimovich 6	Complexo Desportivo de Almada, Almada; Attendance: 1,000; Referees: Gallego, Lamas (ESP)
3 June 1994; 15:30	2× (yellow card) 3× (suspension) 1× (red card)	Report	2× (yellow card) 4× (suspension) 1× (red card)	Complexo Desportivo de Almada, Almada; Attendance: 1,000; Referees: Gallego, Lamas (ESP)

3 June 1994; 17:30	Russia	27–20	Romania	Complexo Desportivo de Almada, Almada; Referees: Johansson, Kjellqvist (SWE)
3 June 1994; 17:30	Gopin, Kudinov 5	(16–9)	Voica 9	Complexo Desportivo de Almada, Almada; Referees: Johansson, Kjellqvist (SWE)
3 June 1994; 17:30	2× (yellow card) 3× (suspension)	Report	1× (yellow card) 2× (suspension)	Complexo Desportivo de Almada, Almada; Referees: Johansson, Kjellqvist (SWE)

3 June 1994; 19:30	France	27–25	Croatia	Complexo Desportivo de Almada, Almada; Attendance: 600; Referees: Sousa, Aires (POR)
3 June 1994; 19:30	Stoecklin, Volle 6	(11–11)	Ćavar 8	Complexo Desportivo de Almada, Almada; Attendance: 600; Referees: Sousa, Aires (POR)
3 June 1994; 19:30	2× (yellow card) 4× (suspension)	Report	2× (yellow card) 1× (suspension)	Complexo Desportivo de Almada, Almada; Attendance: 600; Referees: Sousa, Aires (POR)

4 June 1994; 15:30	Croatia	24–22	Germany	Complexo Desportivo de Almada, Almada; Attendance: 1,500; Referees: Johansson, Kjellqvist (SWE)
4 June 1994; 15:30	Ćavar 6	(14–11)	Kretzschmar 7	Complexo Desportivo de Almada, Almada; Attendance: 1,500; Referees: Johansson, Kjellqvist (SWE)
4 June 1994; 15:30	1× (yellow card) 2× (suspension)	Report	2× (yellow card) 4× (suspension)	Complexo Desportivo de Almada, Almada; Attendance: 1,500; Referees: Johansson, Kjellqvist (SWE)

4 June 1994; 17:30	Belarus	23–31	Russia	Complexo Desportivo de Almada, Almada; Attendance: 2,000; Referees: Jeglič, Jug (SLO)
4 June 1994; 17:30	three players 4	(11–18)	Kudinov 8	Complexo Desportivo de Almada, Almada; Attendance: 2,000; Referees: Jeglič, Jug (SLO)
4 June 1994; 17:30	2× (yellow card) 2× (suspension)	Report	2× (yellow card) 2× (suspension)	Complexo Desportivo de Almada, Almada; Attendance: 2,000; Referees: Jeglič, Jug (SLO)

4 June 1994; 19:30	Romania	27–26	France	Complexo Desportivo de Almada, Almada; Attendance: 1,500; Referees: Gallego, Lamas (ESP)
4 June 1994; 19:30	Răduţă 8	(16–11)	Volle 8	Complexo Desportivo de Almada, Almada; Attendance: 1,500; Referees: Gallego, Lamas (ESP)
4 June 1994; 19:30	3× (yellow card) 6× (suspension) 1× (red card)	Report	1× (yellow card) 3× (suspension)	Complexo Desportivo de Almada, Almada; Attendance: 1,500; Referees: Gallego, Lamas (ESP)

5 June 1994; 15:30	France	21–21	Germany	Complexo Desportivo de Almada, Almada; Attendance: 1,200; Referees: Jeglič, Jug (SLO)
5 June 1994; 15:30	Volle 8	(10–11)	Kretzschmar, Schwarzer 6	Complexo Desportivo de Almada, Almada; Attendance: 1,200; Referees: Jeglič, Jug (SLO)
5 June 1994; 15:30	3× (yellow card) 5× (suspension)	Report	3× (yellow card) 5× (suspension)	Complexo Desportivo de Almada, Almada; Attendance: 1,200; Referees: Jeglič, Jug (SLO)

5 June 1994; 17:30	Russia	21–18	Croatia	Complexo Desportivo de Almada, Almada; Attendance: 600; Referees: Gallego, Lamas (ESP)
5 June 1994; 17:30	Antonevich, Kudinov 5	(13–8)	Smajlagić 5	Complexo Desportivo de Almada, Almada; Attendance: 600; Referees: Gallego, Lamas (ESP)
5 June 1994; 17:30	2× (yellow card) 3× (suspension)	Report	2× (yellow card) 2× (suspension)	Complexo Desportivo de Almada, Almada; Attendance: 600; Referees: Gallego, Lamas (ESP)

5 June 1994; 19:30	Romania	24–33	Belarus	Complexo Desportivo de Almada, Almada; Attendance: 500; Referees: Sousa, Aires (POR)
5 June 1994; 19:30	Voica 10	(9–14)	Chalepo 9	Complexo Desportivo de Almada, Almada; Attendance: 500; Referees: Sousa, Aires (POR)
5 June 1994; 19:30	3× (yellow card) 7× (suspension) 1× (red card)	Report	3× (yellow card) 6× (suspension)	Complexo Desportivo de Almada, Almada; Attendance: 500; Referees: Sousa, Aires (POR)

7 June 1994; 15:30	Germany	16–25	Russia	Complexo Desportivo de Almada, Almada; Attendance: 600; Referees: Johansson, Kjellqvist (SWE)
7 June 1994; 15:30	four players 3	(9–12)	Gopin, Kudinov 6	Complexo Desportivo de Almada, Almada; Attendance: 600; Referees: Johansson, Kjellqvist (SWE)
7 June 1994; 15:30	2× (yellow card) 2× (suspension)	Report	2× (yellow card) 3× (suspension)	Complexo Desportivo de Almada, Almada; Attendance: 600; Referees: Johansson, Kjellqvist (SWE)

7 June 1994; 17:30	France	32–29	Belarus	Complexo Desportivo de Almada, Almada; Attendance: 500; Referees: Gallego, Lamas (ESP)
7 June 1994; 17:30	Munier 7	(16–15)	Charovarov 6	Complexo Desportivo de Almada, Almada; Attendance: 500; Referees: Gallego, Lamas (ESP)
7 June 1994; 17:30	3× (yellow card) 3× (suspension)	Report	1× (yellow card) 2× (suspension)	Complexo Desportivo de Almada, Almada; Attendance: 500; Referees: Gallego, Lamas (ESP)

7 June 1994; 19:30	Croatia	24–23	Romania	Complexo Desportivo de Almada, Almada; Attendance: 500; Referees: Jeglič, Jug (SLO)
7 June 1994; 19:30	Saračević 6	(12–11)	Voica 6	Complexo Desportivo de Almada, Almada; Attendance: 500; Referees: Jeglič, Jug (SLO)
7 June 1994; 19:30	2× (yellow card) 2× (suspension)	Report	2× (yellow card) 4× (suspension)	Complexo Desportivo de Almada, Almada; Attendance: 500; Referees: Jeglič, Jug (SLO)

8 June 1994; 15:30	Germany	25–19	Romania	Complexo Desportivo de Almada, Almada; Attendance: 1,000; Referees: Szajną, Wróblewski (POL)
8 June 1994; 15:30	Winselmann 6	(11–10)	Voica 6	Complexo Desportivo de Almada, Almada; Attendance: 1,000; Referees: Szajną, Wróblewski (POL)
8 June 1994; 15:30	3× (yellow card) 6× (suspension)	Report	3× (yellow card) 4× (suspension)	Complexo Desportivo de Almada, Almada; Attendance: 1,000; Referees: Szajną, Wróblewski (POL)

8 June 1994; 17:30	Belarus	21–29	Croatia	Complexo Desportivo de Almada, Almada; Attendance: 1,000; Referees: Johansson, Kjellqvist (SWE)
8 June 1994; 17:30	Yakimovich 5	(12–12)	Saračević 9	Complexo Desportivo de Almada, Almada; Attendance: 1,000; Referees: Johansson, Kjellqvist (SWE)
8 June 1994; 17:30	2× (yellow card) 3× (suspension)	Report	2× (yellow card) 4× (suspension)	Complexo Desportivo de Almada, Almada; Attendance: 1,000; Referees: Johansson, Kjellqvist (SWE)

8 June 1994; 19:30	Russia	18–17	France	Complexo Desportivo de Almada, Almada; Attendance: 1,200; Referees: Øie, Høgsnes (NOR)
8 June 1994; 19:30	Kudinov 9	(11–9)	Houlet 5	Complexo Desportivo de Almada, Almada; Attendance: 1,200; Referees: Øie, Høgsnes (NOR)
8 June 1994; 19:30	3× (yellow card) 3× (suspension)	Report	2× (yellow card) 2× (suspension)	Complexo Desportivo de Almada, Almada; Attendance: 1,200; Referees: Øie, Høgsnes (NOR)

=== Group B ===
Pos	Team	Pld	W	D	L	GF	GA	GD	Pts	Qualification
1	Sweden	5	5	0	0	114	91	+23	10	Semifinals
2	Denmark	5	3	1	1	107	99	+8	7	Semifinals
3	Spain	5	3	0	2	114	101	+13	6	Fifth place game
4	Hungary	5	2	0	3	100	107	−7	4	Seventh place game
5	Slovenia	5	1	1	3	94	111	−17	3	Ninth place game
6	Portugal (H)	5	0	0	5	96	116	−20	0	Eleventh place game

Source: EHF
(H) Hosts

3 June 1994; 15:30	Sweden	22–17	Slovenia	Pavilhão Rosa Mota, Porto; Attendance: 1,100; Referees: Thomas, Thomas (GER)
3 June 1994; 15:30	Hajas 7	(10–10)	Banfro 6	Pavilhão Rosa Mota, Porto; Attendance: 1,100; Referees: Thomas, Thomas (GER)
3 June 1994; 15:30	4× (yellow card) 3× (suspension)	Report	8× (yellow card) 5× (suspension) 1× (red card)	Pavilhão Rosa Mota, Porto; Attendance: 1,100; Referees: Thomas, Thomas (GER)

3 June 1994; 17:30	Spain	25–20	Hungary	Pavilhão Rosa Mota, Porto; Attendance: 1,100; Referees: Rudin, Schill (SUI)
3 June 1994; 17:30	Urdiales 8	(11–10)	Zsigmond 7	Pavilhão Rosa Mota, Porto; Attendance: 1,100; Referees: Rudin, Schill (SUI)
3 June 1994; 17:30	2× (yellow card) 2× (suspension)	Report	1× (yellow card) 5× (suspension) 1× (red card)	Pavilhão Rosa Mota, Porto; Attendance: 1,100; Referees: Rudin, Schill (SUI)

3 June 1994; 19:30	Denmark	24–17	Portugal	Pavilhão Rosa Mota, Porto; Attendance: 1,100; Referees: Szajną, Wróblewski (POL)
3 June 1994; 19:30	Jørgensen 9	(11–5)	Resende 8	Pavilhão Rosa Mota, Porto; Attendance: 1,100; Referees: Szajną, Wróblewski (POL)
3 June 1994; 19:30	2× (yellow card) 7× (suspension)	Report	1× (yellow card) 3× (suspension)	Pavilhão Rosa Mota, Porto; Attendance: 1,100; Referees: Szajną, Wróblewski (POL)

4 June 1994; 15:30	Slovenia	19–19	Denmark	Pavilhão Rosa Mota, Porto; Attendance: 1,200; Referees: Rudin, Schill (SUI)
4 June 1994; 15:30	Šerbec 6	(8–10)	Jacobsen 9	Pavilhão Rosa Mota, Porto; Attendance: 1,200; Referees: Rudin, Schill (SUI)
4 June 1994; 15:30	3× (yellow card) 5× (suspension)	Report	3× (yellow card) 5× (suspension) 1× (red card)	Pavilhão Rosa Mota, Porto; Attendance: 1,200; Referees: Rudin, Schill (SUI)

4 June 1994; 17:30	Hungary	18–22	Sweden	Pavilhão Rosa Mota, Porto; Attendance: 1,700; Referees: Szajną, Wróblewski (POL)
4 June 1994; 17:30	Éles 5	(7–13)	Hajas 8	Pavilhão Rosa Mota, Porto; Attendance: 1,700; Referees: Szajną, Wróblewski (POL)
4 June 1994; 17:30	1× (yellow card) 4× (suspension)	Report	2× (yellow card) 4× (suspension)	Pavilhão Rosa Mota, Porto; Attendance: 1,700; Referees: Szajną, Wróblewski (POL)

4 June 1994; 19:30	Portugal	18–24	Spain	Pavilhão Rosa Mota, Porto; Attendance: 2,600; Referees: Øie, Høgsnes (NOR)
4 June 1994; 19:30	Faria 5	(8–13)	Etxaburu, Franch 7	Pavilhão Rosa Mota, Porto; Attendance: 2,600; Referees: Øie, Høgsnes (NOR)
4 June 1994; 19:30	3× (yellow card) 4× (suspension)	Report	2× (yellow card) 2× (suspension)	Pavilhão Rosa Mota, Porto; Attendance: 2,600; Referees: Øie, Høgsnes (NOR)

5 June 1994; 15:30	Hungary	19–18	Portugal	Pavilhão Rosa Mota, Porto; Attendance: 2,000; Referees: Thomas, Thomas (GER)
5 June 1994; 15:30	Pásztor 6	(7–8)	Resende 7	Pavilhão Rosa Mota, Porto; Attendance: 2,000; Referees: Thomas, Thomas (GER)
5 June 1994; 15:30	2× (yellow card) 2× (suspension)	Report	2× (yellow card) 2× (suspension)	Pavilhão Rosa Mota, Porto; Attendance: 2,000; Referees: Thomas, Thomas (GER)

5 June 1994; 17:30	Sweden	22–16	Denmark	Pavilhão Rosa Mota, Porto; Attendance: 1,000; Referees: Øie, Høgsnes (NOR)
5 June 1994; 17:30	Olsson 8	(7–6)	Thrane 4	Pavilhão Rosa Mota, Porto; Attendance: 1,000; Referees: Øie, Høgsnes (NOR)
5 June 1994; 17:30	2× (yellow card) 7× (suspension)		1× (yellow card) 2× (suspension)	Pavilhão Rosa Mota, Porto; Attendance: 1,000; Referees: Øie, Høgsnes (NOR)

5 June 1994; 19:30	Spain	24–16	Slovenia	Pavilhão Rosa Mota, Porto; Attendance: 800; Referees: Szajną, Wróblewski (POL)
5 June 1994; 19:30	Alemany, Urdiales 5	(13–8)	Likavec 4	Pavilhão Rosa Mota, Porto; Attendance: 800; Referees: Szajną, Wróblewski (POL)
5 June 1994; 19:30	2× (yellow card) 7× (suspension) 1× (red card)	Report	3× (yellow card) 3× (suspension)	Pavilhão Rosa Mota, Porto; Attendance: 800; Referees: Szajną, Wróblewski (POL)

7 June 1994; 15:30	Slovenia	19–24	Hungary	Pavilhão Rosa Mota, Porto; Attendance: 1,700; Referees: Øie, Høgsnes (NOR)
7 June 1994; 15:30	Šerbec 8	(9–11)	Pásztor, Sótonyi 7	Pavilhão Rosa Mota, Porto; Attendance: 1,700; Referees: Øie, Høgsnes (NOR)
7 June 1994; 15:30	3× (yellow card) 2× (suspension)	Report	2× (yellow card) 2× (suspension)	Pavilhão Rosa Mota, Porto; Attendance: 1,700; Referees: Øie, Høgsnes (NOR)

7 June 1994; 17:30	Sweden	26–21	Portugal	Pavilhão Rosa Mota, Porto; Attendance: 2,100; Referees: Rudin, Schill (SUI)
7 June 1994; 17:30	Hajas 5	(12–9)	Resende 6	Pavilhão Rosa Mota, Porto; Attendance: 2,100; Referees: Rudin, Schill (SUI)
7 June 1994; 17:30	1× (yellow card) 6× (suspension) 1× (red card)	Report	2× (yellow card) 4× (suspension)	Pavilhão Rosa Mota, Porto; Attendance: 2,100; Referees: Rudin, Schill (SUI)

7 June 1994; 19:30	Denmark	25–22	Spain	Pavilhão Rosa Mota, Porto; Attendance: 1,900; Referees: Thomas, Thomas (GER)
7 June 1994; 19:30	Jacobsen 6	(10–7)	Urdangarin 6	Pavilhão Rosa Mota, Porto; Attendance: 1,900; Referees: Thomas, Thomas (GER)
7 June 1994; 19:30	3× (yellow card) 6× (suspension) 1× (red card)	Report	3× (suspension)	Pavilhão Rosa Mota, Porto; Attendance: 1,900; Referees: Thomas, Thomas (GER)

8 June 1994; 15:30	Denmark	23–19	Hungary	Pavilhão Rosa Mota, Porto; Attendance: 2,500; Referees: Sousa, Aires (POR)
8 June 1994; 15:30	Jørgensen 9	(10–8)	Csoknyai, Éles 4	Pavilhão Rosa Mota, Porto; Attendance: 2,500; Referees: Sousa, Aires (POR)
8 June 1994; 15:30	2× (yellow card) 1× (suspension)	Report	2× (yellow card) 3× (suspension)	Pavilhão Rosa Mota, Porto; Attendance: 2,500; Referees: Sousa, Aires (POR)

8 June 1994; 17:30	Portugal	22–23	Slovenia	Pavilhão Rosa Mota, Porto; Attendance: 3,100; Referees: Thomas, Thomas (GER)
8 June 1994; 17:30	Resende 8	(10–8)	Likavec 8	Pavilhão Rosa Mota, Porto; Attendance: 3,100; Referees: Thomas, Thomas (GER)
8 June 1994; 17:30	3× (yellow card) 5× (suspension)	Report	2× (yellow card) 7× (suspension) 1× (red card)	Pavilhão Rosa Mota, Porto; Attendance: 3,100; Referees: Thomas, Thomas (GER)

8 June 1994; 19:30	Spain	19–22	Sweden	Pavilhão Rosa Mota, Porto; Attendance: 1,800; Referees: Jeglič, Jug (SLO)
8 June 1994; 19:30	Urdiales 8	(8–10)	Carlén 6	Pavilhão Rosa Mota, Porto; Attendance: 1,800; Referees: Jeglič, Jug (SLO)
8 June 1994; 19:30	3× (yellow card) 7× (suspension) 1× (red card)	Report	3× (yellow card) 6× (suspension) 1× (red card)	Pavilhão Rosa Mota, Porto; Attendance: 1,800; Referees: Jeglič, Jug (SLO)

== Placement games ==
=== Eleventh place game ===
10 June 1994; 12:30	Romania	38–21	Portugal	Complexo Municipal de Desportos, Almada; Attendance: 650; Referees: Szajną, Wróblewski (POL)
10 June 1994; 12:30	Licu, Mocanu 8	(18–11)	Oliveira, Resende 4	Complexo Municipal de Desportos, Almada; Attendance: 650; Referees: Szajną, Wróblewski (POL)
10 June 1994; 12:30	3× (yellow card) 4× (suspension)	Report	2× (yellow card) 4× (suspension)	Complexo Municipal de Desportos, Almada; Attendance: 650; Referees: Szajną, Wróblewski (POL)

=== Ninth place game ===
10 June 1994; 10:30	Germany	28–18	Slovenia	Complexo Municipal de Desportos, Almada; Attendance: 600; Referees: Sousa, Aires (POR)
10 June 1994; 10:30	Kretzschmar 8	(15–10)	Banfro 7	Complexo Municipal de Desportos, Almada; Attendance: 600; Referees: Sousa, Aires (POR)
10 June 1994; 10:30	2× (yellow card) 1× (suspension)	Report	2× (yellow card) 2× (suspension)	Complexo Municipal de Desportos, Almada; Attendance: 600; Referees: Sousa, Aires (POR)

=== Seventh place game ===
10 June 1994; 17:30	Belarus	24–28	Hungary	Complexo Municipal de Desportos, Almada; Attendance: 500; Referees: Gallego, Lamas (ESP)
10 June 1994; 17:30	Holdzin 7	(14–16)	Bartók 7	Complexo Municipal de Desportos, Almada; Attendance: 500; Referees: Gallego, Lamas (ESP)
10 June 1994; 17:30	1× (yellow card) 1× (suspension)	Report	3× (yellow card) 4× (suspension)	Complexo Municipal de Desportos, Almada; Attendance: 500; Referees: Gallego, Lamas (ESP)

=== Fifth place game ===
10 June 1994; 19:30	France	25–28	Spain	Complexo Municipal de Desportos, Almada; Attendance: 600; Referees: Johansson, Kjellqvist (SWE)
10 June 1994; 19:30	Houlet 6	(15–12)	Urdiales 7	Complexo Municipal de Desportos, Almada; Attendance: 600; Referees: Johansson, Kjellqvist (SWE)
10 June 1994; 19:30	2× (yellow card) 2× (suspension)	Report	2× (yellow card) 2× (suspension)	Complexo Municipal de Desportos, Almada; Attendance: 600; Referees: Johansson, Kjellqvist (SWE)

== Knockout stage ==
=== Bracket ===
Semifinals
Russia	29
Denmark	20
Sweden	24
Croatia	21

Final
Russia	21
Sweden	34
Third place
Denmark	23
Croatia	24

=== Semifinals ===
11 June 1994; 15:30	Russia	29–20	Denmark	Pavilhão Rosa Mota, Porto; Attendance: 2,100; Referees: Rudin, Schill (SUI)
11 June 1994; 15:30	Kudinov 8	(14–8)	Jensen 5	Pavilhão Rosa Mota, Porto; Attendance: 2,100; Referees: Rudin, Schill (SUI)
11 June 1994; 15:30	3× (yellow card) 2× (suspension)	Report	3× (yellow card) 5× (suspension) 1× (red card)	Pavilhão Rosa Mota, Porto; Attendance: 2,100; Referees: Rudin, Schill (SUI)

11 June 1994; 17:30	Sweden	24–21	Croatia	Pavilhão Rosa Mota, Porto; Attendance: 2,300; Referees: Thomas, Thomas (GER)
11 June 1994; 17:30	Hajas 7	(13–7)	Kljaić 6	Pavilhão Rosa Mota, Porto; Attendance: 2,300; Referees: Thomas, Thomas (GER)
11 June 1994; 17:30	3× (yellow card) 3× (suspension)	Report	2× (yellow card) 5× (suspension)	Pavilhão Rosa Mota, Porto; Attendance: 2,300; Referees: Thomas, Thomas (GER)

=== Third place game ===
12 June 1994; 14:00	Croatia	24–23	Denmark	Pavilhão Rosa Mota, Porto; Attendance: 2,300; Referees: Jeglič, Jug (SLO)
12 June 1994; 14:00	Jelčić 6	(12–13)	Jacobsen 7	Pavilhão Rosa Mota, Porto; Attendance: 2,300; Referees: Jeglič, Jug (SLO)
12 June 1994; 14:00	2× (yellow card) 2× (suspension)	Report	2× (yellow card) 3× (suspension)	Pavilhão Rosa Mota, Porto; Attendance: 2,300; Referees: Jeglič, Jug (SLO)

=== Final ===
12 June 1994; 16:00	Russia	21–34	Sweden	Pavilhão Rosa Mota, Porto; Attendance: 3,200; Referees: Øie, Høgsnes (NOR)
12 June 1994; 16:00	Kudinov 9	(9–18)	Hajas 8	Pavilhão Rosa Mota, Porto; Attendance: 3,200; Referees: Øie, Høgsnes (NOR)
12 June 1994; 16:00	3× (yellow card) 2× (suspension)	Report	2× (yellow card) 7× (suspension) 1× (red card)	Pavilhão Rosa Mota, Porto; Attendance: 3,200; Referees: Øie, Høgsnes (NOR)

== Ranking and statistics ==
=== Final ranking ===
1st place, gold medalist(s)	Sweden
2nd place, silver medalist(s)	Russia
3rd place, bronze medalist(s)	Croatia
4	Denmark
5	Spain
6	France
7	Hungary
8	Belarus
9	Germany
10	Slovenia
11	Romania
12	Portugal

=== Top player awards ===
- Most Valuable Player: Magnus Andersson (SWE)
- Top Scorer : Vasily Kudinov (RUS), 50 goals

=== All Star Team ===
- Goalkeeper: Tomas Svensson (SWE)
- Right wing: Pierre Thorsson (SWE)
- Right back: Jan Jørgensen (DEN)
- Centre back: Magnus Andersson (SWE)
- Left back: Vasily Kudinov (RUS)
- Left wing: Erik Hajas (SWE)
- Pivot: Dmitri Torgovanov (RUS)

Source: "Men's EHF Euro 1994". ehfeuro.eurohandball.com..
