= Călugareni =

Călugareni may refer to several villages in Romania:

- Călugareni, Arad, a village in Felnac, Arad
- Călugareni, Bacău, a village in Dămienești Commune, Bacău County
