= Niclas Pieczkowski =

German handball player (born 1989)

Personal information
- Nationality: German
- Born: 28 December 1989 (age 36) Hagen-Hohenlimburg, Germany
- Height: 1.93 m (6 ft 4 in)

Sport
- Sport: Handball
- Position: Centre back
- Current club: VfL Eintracht Hagen
- Number: 14

Youth career
- Years: Team
- 1995-2005: Letmather TV
- 2005-2006: HTV Sundwig/Westig
- 2006-2008: VfL Eintracht Hagen

Senior clubs
- Years: Team
- 2008–2010: VfL Eintracht Hagen
- 2010–2014: TUSEM Essen
- 2014–2016: TuS Nettelstedt-Lübbecke
- 2016–2021: SC DHfK Leipzig
- 2021-2023: GWD Minden
- 2023-: VfL Eintracht Hagen
National team
Years	Team	Apps	(Gls)
2015–	Germany	41	(46)
Medal record
European Championship
Gold medal – first place	2016 Poland
- Updated on 18 August 2023

Niclas Pieczkowski (born 28 December 1989) is a German handball player for VfL Eintracht Hagen and the German national team.

He was a part of the German team, that won gold medals at the 2016 European Men's Handball Championship.

== Career ==
Niclas Pieczkowski started playing handball at the age of 5 at Letmather TV. In 2005 he moved to HTV Sundwig/Westig, and in 2006 he moved VfL Eintracht Hagen. Two years after he broke through on the senior team. From 2008 to 2010 he was regular player for their Regionalliga team.

In 2010 he signed for the 2. Bundesliga team TUSEM Essen. With them he was promoted to the Handball-Bundesliga in 2012. In 2013 he joined league rivals TuS N-Lübbecke. He played for them for three years, before joining SC DHfK Leipzig in 2016. He signed a two-year contract with the club. He later extended the contract until 2020, and in 2020 he extended for one further year.

In 2021 he joined GWD Minden.

In the summer of 2023 he returned to VfL Eintracht Hagen.

=== Season Statistics ===
Season	Team	League	Games	Goals
2011/12	TUSEM Essen	2. HBL	38	96
2012/13	TUSEM Essen	HBL	33	97
2013/14	TUSEM Essen	2. HBL	32	130
2014/15	TuS N-Lübbecke	HBL	33	94
2015/16	TuS N-Lübbecke	HBL	32	115
2016/17	SC DHfK Leipzig	HBL	30	105
2017/18	SC DHfK Leipzig	HBL	31	97
2018/19	SC DHfK Leipzig	HBL	31	56
2019/20	SC DHfK Leipzig	HBL	4	1
2020/21	SC DHfK Leipzig	HBL	23	40
2021/22	GWD Minden	HBL	31	85
2022/23	GWD Minden	HBL	27	70
Total HBL			275	760
Total 2. HBL			70	226

Source: Player profile at the Handball-Bundesliga webpage

=== National team ===
He debuted for the German national team in 2015 against Switzerland.

He was initially part of the 20-squad for the 2016 European Championship, but did not make the 16 man tournament squad. He later came into the team to replace Maximilian Janke.

== Achievements ==
- European Championship:
  - Gold: 2016
