= Mitică (given name) =

Mitică, a diminutive of Dumitru, is a Romanian male given name that may refer to:

- Mitică Bontaş (born 1970), Romanian handball player
- Mitică Popescu (born 1936), Romanian actor
- Mitică Pricop (born 1977), Romanian sprint canoer
- Mitica Constantin (born 1962), Romanian middle-distance runner
- Mitica Theodorescu (1888–1946), Romanian journalist, humorist, and critic
- Mitică, a fictional character
