= Birgir Sigurðsson =

Birgir Sigurðsson may refer to:

- Birgir Sigurðsson (writer) (1937–2019), Icelandic writer
- Birgir Sigurðsson (handballer) (born 1965), Icelandic former handball player
