= Sigurður Bjarnason =

Sigurður Bjarnason may refer to:

- Sigurður Bjarnason (handballer)
- Sigurður Bjarnason (politician)
