= Handball at the 1992 Summer Olympics – Men's tournament =

1992 Men's Olympic handball tournament
Tournament details
- Host country: Spain
- Venues: 2 (in 2 host cities)
- Dates: 27 July – 8 August 1992
- Teams: 12

Final positions
- Champions: Unified Team
- Runners-up: Sweden
- Third place: France
- Fourth place: Iceland

Tournament statistics
- Matches played: 38
- Goals scored: 1,616 (42.53 per match)
- Top scorers: Talant Duyshebaev (EUN) (47 goals)

The men's handball tournament at the 1992 Summer Olympics was contested by twelve teams divided in two groups, with the top two proceeding to the semifinals and the bottom four proceeding to placement matches.

== Qualification ==
Mean of qualification	Date	Host	Vacancies	Qualified
Host nation	17 October 1986	(Switzerland) Lausanne	1	Spain
1990 World Championship	28 February – 10 March 1990	Czechoslovakia	8	Sweden; Unified Team; Romania; Hungary; Czechoslovakia; Germany; France; Iceland
1991 Pan American Games	5–12 August 1991	(Cuba) Havana	1	Brazil
1991 Asian Championship	22 August –1 September 1991	(Japan) Hiroshima	1	South Korea
1991 African Men's Handball Championship	September 1991	(Egypt) Cairo	1	Egypt
Total			12	

== Preliminary round ==
=== Group A ===
Pos	Team	Pld	W	D	L	GF	GA	GD	Pts	Qualification
1	Sweden	5	5	0	0	120	86	+34	10	Semifinals
2	Iceland	5	3	1	1	101	99	+2	7	Semifinals
3	South Korea	5	3	0	2	114	117	−3	6	Fifth place game
4	Hungary	5	2	0	3	102	108	−6	4	Seventh place game
5	Czechoslovakia	5	1	1	3	94	92	+2	3	Ninth place game
6	Brazil	5	0	0	5	96	125	−29	0	Eleventh place game

27 July 1992; 11:30	Sweden	20–14	Czechoslovakia	Palau d'Esports de Granollers, Granollers; Referees: Lelong, Tancrez (FRA)
27 July 1992; 11:30	Thorsson 7	(8–7)	Bergendi 4	Palau d'Esports de Granollers, Granollers; Referees: Lelong, Tancrez (FRA)

27 July 1992; 14:30	Iceland	19–18	Brazil	Palau d'Esports de Granollers, Granollers; Referees: Gallego, Lamas (ESP)
27 July 1992; 14:30	Jónasson 6	(10–10)	Nascimento 5	Palau d'Esports de Granollers, Granollers; Referees: Gallego, Lamas (ESP)

27 July 1992; 19:00	Hungary	18–22	South Korea	Palau d'Esports de Granollers, Granollers; Referees: Øie, Høgsnes (NOR)
27 July 1992; 19:00	Iváncsik 7	(11–11)	Cho C. 9	Palau d'Esports de Granollers, Granollers; Referees: Øie, Høgsnes (NOR)

29 July 1992; 10:00	South Korea	18–28	Sweden	Palau d'Esports de Granollers, Granollers; Referees: Thomas, Thomas (GER)
29 July 1992; 10:00	Cho C. 5	(6–15)	Thorsson 7	Palau d'Esports de Granollers, Granollers; Referees: Thomas, Thomas (GER)

29 July 1992; 14:30	Brazil	21–27	Hungary	Palau d'Esports de Granollers, Granollers; Referees: Convents, Xhonneux (BEL)
29 July 1992; 14:30	Nascimento 5	(10–10)	Iváncsik 5	Palau d'Esports de Granollers, Granollers; Referees: Convents, Xhonneux (BEL)

29 July 1992; 20:30	Czechoslovakia	16–16	Iceland	Palau d'Esports de Granollers, Granollers; Referees: Guterman (LTU), Taranukhin (RUS)
29 July 1992; 20:30	Bergendi 4	(9–9)	Grímsson 4	Palau d'Esports de Granollers, Granollers; Referees: Guterman (LTU), Taranukhin (RUS)

31 July 1992; 11:30	Czechoslovakia	19–20	South Korea	Palau d'Esports de Granollers, Granollers; Referees: Gallego, Lamas (ESP)
31 July 1992; 11:30	Tonar 6	(11–7)	Cho C. 6	Palau d'Esports de Granollers, Granollers; Referees: Gallego, Lamas (ESP)

31 July 1992; 14:30	Iceland	22–16	Hungary	Palau d'Esports de Granollers, Granollers; Referees: Lelong, Tancrez (FRA)
31 July 1992; 14:30	Grímsson 6		Marosi 4	Palau d'Esports de Granollers, Granollers; Referees: Lelong, Tancrez (FRA)

31 July 1992; 19:00	Sweden	22–15	Brazil	Palau d'Esports de Granollers, Granollers; Referees: Guterman (LTU), Taranukhin (RUS)
31 July 1992; 19:00	Hedin 6	(11–7)	Carnasciali 5	Palau d'Esports de Granollers, Granollers; Referees: Guterman (LTU), Taranukhin (RUS)

2 August 1992; 10:00	Iceland	26–24	South Korea	Palau d'Esports de Granollers, Granollers; Referees: Rudin, Schill (SUI)
2 August 1992; 10:00	Grímsson 8	(11–14)	Cho C. 9	Palau d'Esports de Granollers, Granollers; Referees: Rudin, Schill (SUI)

2 August 1992; 16:00	Hungary	21–25	Sweden	Palau d'Esports de Granollers, Granollers; Referees: Gallego, Lamas (ESP)
2 August 1992; 16:00	Éles 5	(10–14)	Hajas 6	Palau d'Esports de Granollers, Granollers; Referees: Gallego, Lamas (ESP)

2 August 1992; 19:00	Brazil	16–27	Czechoslovakia	Palau d'Esports de Granollers, Granollers; Referees: Szajna, Wróblewski (POL)
2 August 1992; 19:00	Vieira 4	(9–9)	Tonar 8	Palau d'Esports de Granollers, Granollers; Referees: Szajna, Wróblewski (POL)

4 August 1992; 11:30	Hungary	20–18	Czechoslovakia	Palau d'Esports de Granollers, Granollers; Referees: Thomas, Thomas (GER)
4 August 1992; 11:30	Horváth 7	(9–8)	Šetlík 6	Palau d'Esports de Granollers, Granollers; Referees: Thomas, Thomas (GER)

4 August 1992; 14:30	South Korea	30–26	Brazil	Palau d'Esports de Granollers, Granollers; Referees: Guterman (LTU), Taranukhin (RUS)
4 August 1992; 14:30	Cho C. 9	(16–13)	Vieira 6	Palau d'Esports de Granollers, Granollers; Referees: Guterman (LTU), Taranukhin (RUS)

4 August 1992; 20:30	Sweden	25–18	Iceland	Palau d'Esports de Granollers, Granollers; Referees: Christensen, Jørgensen (DEN)
4 August 1992; 20:30	Carlén 8	(12–7)	Sveinsson 5	Palau d'Esports de Granollers, Granollers; Referees: Christensen, Jørgensen (DEN)

=== Group B ===
Pos	Team	Pld	W	D	L	GF	GA	GD	Pts	Qualification
1	Unified Team	5	5	0	0	121	98	+23	10	Semifinals
2	France	5	4	0	1	111	98	+13	8	Semifinals
3	Spain (H)	5	3	0	2	97	98	−1	6	Fifth place game
4	Romania	5	1	1	3	107	115	−8	3 (Note: 25% rule: Romania –9 GD; Germany –14 GD)	Seventh place game
5	Germany	5	1	1	3	97	103	−6	3	Ninth place game
6	Egypt	5	0	0	5	92	113	−21	0	Eleventh place game

(H) Hosts
Notes:

27 July 1992; 10:00	Romania	22–21	Egypt	Palau d'Esports de Granollers, Granollers; Referees: Johansson, Kjellkvist (SWE)
27 July 1992; 10:00	Berbece 5	(10–12)	Belal 6	Palau d'Esports de Granollers, Granollers; Referees: Johansson, Kjellkvist (SWE)

27 July 1992; 16:00	Unified Team	25–15	Germany	Palau d'Esports de Granollers, Granollers; Referees: Jug, Jeglič (SLO)
27 July 1992; 16:00	Dujshebaev 7	(12–7)	Hauck 5	Palau d'Esports de Granollers, Granollers; Referees: Jug, Jeglič (SLO)

27 July 1992; 20:30	Spain	16–18	France	Palau d'Esports de Granollers, Granollers; Referees: Szajna, Wróblewski (POL)
27 July 1992; 20:30	Masip 5	(7–7)	Volle 4	Palau d'Esports de Granollers, Granollers; Referees: Szajna, Wróblewski (POL)

29 July 1992; 11:30	France	22–23	Unified Team	Palau d'Esports de Granollers, Granollers; Referees: Rudin, Schill (SUI)
29 July 1992; 11:30	Munier, Portes 4	(12–14)	Dujshebaev 9	Palau d'Esports de Granollers, Granollers; Referees: Rudin, Schill (SUI)

29 July 1992; 16:00	Germany	20–20	Romania	Palau d'Esports de Granollers, Granollers; Referees: Christensen, Jørgensen (DEN)
29 July 1992; 16:00	Winselmann 5	(9–13)	Licu, Zaharia 5	Palau d'Esports de Granollers, Granollers; Referees: Christensen, Jørgensen (DEN)

29 July 1992; 19:00	Egypt	18–23	Spain	Palau d'Esports de Granollers, Granollers; Referees: Goto, Shimada (JPN)
29 July 1992; 19:00	five players 3	(11–11)	Urdiales 9	Palau d'Esports de Granollers, Granollers; Referees: Goto, Shimada (JPN)

31 July 1992; 10:00	Unified Team	22–18	Egypt	Palau d'Esports de Granollers, Granollers; Referees: Christensen, Jørgensen (DEN)
31 July 1992; 10:00	Dujshebaev 8	(12–9)	Abdallah, El-Attar 4	Palau d'Esports de Granollers, Granollers; Referees: Christensen, Jørgensen (DEN)

31 July 1992; 16:00	Germany	20–23	France	Palau d'Esports de Granollers, Granollers; Referees: Johansson, Kjellkvist (SWE)
31 July 1992; 16:00	three players 4	(9–10)	Lathoud, Munier 5	Palau d'Esports de Granollers, Granollers; Referees: Johansson, Kjellkvist (SWE)

31 July 1992; 20:30	Romania	20–21	Spain	Palau d'Esports de Granollers, Granollers; Referees: Jug, Jeglič (SLO)
31 July 1992; 20:30	Licu, Mocanu 4	(9–14)	Alemany, Urdiales 4	Palau d'Esports de Granollers, Granollers; Referees: Jug, Jeglič (SLO)

2 August 1992; 11:30	Romania	20–26	France	Palau d'Esports de Granollers, Granollers; Referees: Øie, Høgsnes (NOR)
2 August 1992; 11:30	Licu, Zaharia 7	(11–12)	Lathoud 6	Palau d'Esports de Granollers, Granollers; Referees: Øie, Høgsnes (NOR)

2 August 1992; 14:30	Egypt	16–24	Germany	Palau d'Esports de Granollers, Granollers; Referees: Convents, Xhonneux (BEL)
2 August 1992; 14:30	El-Attar 6	(5–13)	Roos 7	Palau d'Esports de Granollers, Granollers; Referees: Convents, Xhonneux (BEL)

2 August 1992; 20:30	Spain	18–24	Unified Team	Palau d'Esports de Granollers, Granollers; Referees: Johansson, Kjellkvist (SWE)
2 August 1992; 20:30	Masip, Muñoz 5	(5–10)	Gopin 7	Palau d'Esports de Granollers, Granollers; Referees: Johansson, Kjellkvist (SWE)

4 August 1992; 10:00	France	22–19	Egypt	Palau d'Esports de Granollers, Granollers; Referees: Jug, Jeglič (SLO)
4 August 1992; 10:00	Munier 8	(10–7)	Debes, Mohamed 4	Palau d'Esports de Granollers, Granollers; Referees: Jug, Jeglič (SLO)

4 August 1992; 16:00	Unified Team	27–25	Romania	Palau d'Esports de Granollers, Granollers; Referees: Szajna, Wróblewski (POL)
4 August 1992; 16:00	Dujshebaev, Kudinov 6	(12–12)	Licu 8	Palau d'Esports de Granollers, Granollers; Referees: Szajna, Wróblewski (POL)

4 August 1992; 19:00	Spain	19–18	Germany	Palau d'Esports de Granollers, Granollers; Referees: Øie, Høgsnes (NOR)
4 August 1992; 19:00	Urdiales 7	(8–8)	Hauck 6	Palau d'Esports de Granollers, Granollers; Referees: Øie, Høgsnes (NOR)

== Playoffs ==
=== Bracket ===
Semifinals
6 August
Sweden	25
France	22
6 August
Iceland	19
Unified Team	23

Gold medal
8 August
Sweden	20
Unified Team	22
Bronze medal
8 August
Iceland	20
France	24

=== Semifinals ===
6 August 1992; 19:00	Sweden	25–22	France	Palau d'Esports de Granollers, Granollers; Referees: Szajna, Wróblewski (POL)
6 August 1992; 19:00	Thorsson 6	(11–10)	Lathoud 6	Palau d'Esports de Granollers, Granollers; Referees: Szajna, Wróblewski (POL)

6 August 1992; 21:00	Iceland	19–23	Unified Team	Palau d'Esports de Granollers, Granollers; Referees: Thomas, Thomas (GER)
6 August 1992; 21:00	Grímsson 6	(9–11)	Dujshebaev 9	Palau d'Esports de Granollers, Granollers; Referees: Thomas, Thomas (GER)

=== Eleventh place game ===
7 August 1992
14:00
Egypt
27–24 (ET)
Brazil
Palau d'Esports de Granollers, Granollers
Referees: Amigo, González (ESP)
Mahmoud 8
(10–8)
Carnasciali, Nascimento 5

FT: 19–19 ET: 3–3, 2–2 Pen: 3–0

=== Ninth place game ===
7 August 1992; 16:00	Czechoslovakia	20–19	Germany	Palau d'Esports de Granollers, Granollers; Referees: Lelong, Tancrez (FRA)
7 August 1992; 16:00	Šetlík 6	(11–8)	Hahn 5	Palau d'Esports de Granollers, Granollers; Referees: Lelong, Tancrez (FRA)

=== Seventh place game ===
7 August 1992; 19:00	Romania	19–23	Hungary	Palau d'Esports de Granollers, Granollers; Referees: Rudin, Schill (SUI)
7 August 1992; 19:00	Prisăcaru 4	(13–9)	Horváth 7	Palau d'Esports de Granollers, Granollers; Referees: Rudin, Schill (SUI)

=== Fifth place game ===
7 August 1992; 21:00	South Korea	21–36	Spain	Palau d'Esports de Granollers, Granollers; Referees: Øie, Høgsnes (NOR)
7 August 1992; 21:00	Cho C. 7	(10–18)	Urdiales 10	Palau d'Esports de Granollers, Granollers; Referees: Øie, Høgsnes (NOR)

=== Bronze medal game ===
8 August 1992; 15:00	Iceland	20–24	France	Palau Sant Jordi, Barcelona; Referees: Guterman (LTU), Taranukhin (RUS)
8 August 1992; 15:00	Grímsson 5	(9–12)	Munier 6	Palau Sant Jordi, Barcelona; Referees: Guterman (LTU), Taranukhin (RUS)

=== Gold medal game ===
8 August 1992; 17:00	Sweden	20–22	Unified Team	Palau Sant Jordi, Barcelona; Referees: Gallego, Lamas (ESP)
8 August 1992; 17:00	Hajas 7	(9–9)	Gavrilov 5	Palau Sant Jordi, Barcelona; Referees: Gallego, Lamas (ESP)

== Rankings and statistics ==
Final rankings
1	Unified Team
2	Sweden
3	France
4	Iceland
5	Spain
6	South Korea
7	Hungary
8	Romania
9	Czechoslovakia
10	Germany
11	Egypt
12	Brazil

Top goalscorers
Player	Games	Goals
1. Talant Duyshebaev (EUN)	7	47
2. Chi-Hyo Cho (KOR)	6	45
3. Valdimar Grimsson (ISL)	7	35
4. Robert Licu (ROM)	6	30
4. Erik Hajas (SWE)	6	30
4. Alberto Urdiales (ESP)	4	30
7. Mikhail Yakimovich (EUN)	7	29
8. Valeri Gopin (EUN)	7	27
8. Valentin Zaharia (ROM)	6	27

All-star team
Andrei Lavrov (EUN)
Chi-Hyo Cho (KOR)	Talant Duyshebaev (EUN)	Denis Lathoud (FRA)
Per Carlén (SWE)	Pierre Thorsson (SWE)	Valeri Gopine (EUN)
