= Anders Oechsler =

Danish handball player (born 1979)

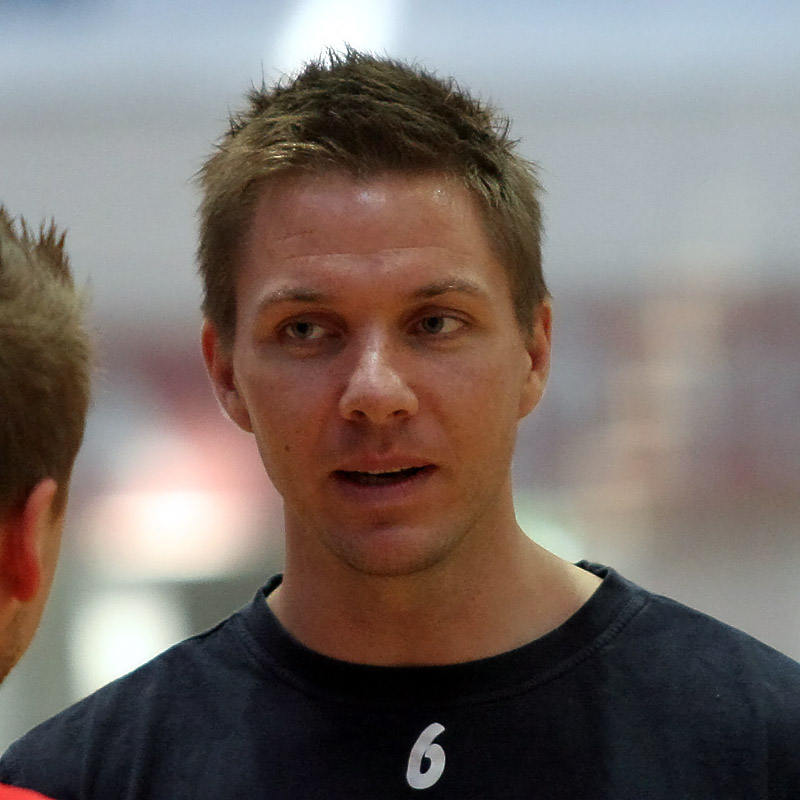

Personal information
- Nationality: Danish
- Born: 10 July 1979 (age 47) Ringsted, Denmark
- Height: 201 cm (79 in)

Sport
- Sport: Handball
- Position: Left back
- Current club: Retired

Youth career
- Years: Team
- –: Ringsted IF
- –: Ajax Farum

Senior clubs
- Years: Team
- 2003–2006: KIF Kolding
- 2008–2009: TV Grosswallstadt (Germany)
- 2009–2012: KIF Kolding
- 2012–2014: GWD Minden (Germany)
- 2014–2016: Team Tvis Holstebro
National team
Years	Team	Apps	(Gls)
2010–2015	Denmark	37	(75)

Anders Oechsler (born 10 July 1979) is a Danish retired handball player (right back) who lastly played for the Danish league team Team Tvis Holstebro. Previously he played for KIF Kolding in Denmark and GWD Minden and TV Grosswallstadt in Germany. He retired in 2016.

Oechsler played 37 games for the Danish national team and made 75 goals between 2014 and 2015.

In 2018 he entered the administration of his former club KIF Kolding.
