= Eintracht Hildesheim =

German handball club

- Full name: Eintracht Hildesheim von 1861 e. V.
- Founded: July 19, 1861; 165 years ago
- Arena: Sparkassen-Arena, Hildesheim
- Capacity: 2400
- President: Clemens Löcke
- League: 3. Liga
- 2024–25: 1st (promoted)
- Club colours
Home	Away

Eintracht Hildesheim is a German sports club from Hildesheim, most famous for its handball team. The club was founded in 1861 and has around 7000 members. The club also has departments for basketball, tennis, judo, fencing, and hockey among others.

The handball team has played in the handball-Bundesliga on several occations, most recently in 2011-12. The team currently plays in the 3. Liga.

== Seasons ==
Season	League	Position	Games	W	D	L	Goals	Goal Diff.	Points
1998/99	2. Bundesliga Nord	3	34	20	2	12	785:704	+81	42:26
1999/2000	2. Bundesliga Nord	2	32	24	1	7	798:700	+89	49:15
2000/01	1. Bundesliga	20	38	2	3	33	845:1084	−239	7:69
2001/02	2. Bundesliga Nord	8	36	19	2	15	992:937	+55	40:32
2002/03	2. Bundesliga Nord	4	34	20	2	12	980:938	+42	42:26
2003/04	2. Bundesliga Nord	5	34	18	2	14	970:941	+29	38:30
2004/05	2. Bundesliga Nord	2	34	27	0	7	1084:947	+137	54:14
2005/06	2. Bundesliga Nord	1	38	28	4	6	1126:979	+147	60:16
2006/07	1. Bundesliga	18	34	5	1	28	939:1077	−138	11:57
2007/08	2. Bundesliga Nord	2	34	25	4	5	1046:870	+176	54:14
2008/09	2. Bundesliga Nord	9	34	15	2	17	977:988	−11	32:36
2009/10	2. Bundesliga Nord	9	32	14	3	15	908:925	−17	31:33
2010/11	2. Bundesliga Nord	1	32	25	1	6	962:855	+107	51:13
2011/12	1. Bundesliga	18	34	2	0	32	865:1081	−216	4:64
2012/13	2. Bundesliga	13	36	15	4	17	927:923	+4	34:38
2013/14	2. Bundesliga	13	36	14	5	17	986:994	−8	33:39
2014/15	2. Bundesliga	18	38	8	2	28	972:1086	−114	18:58
2015/16	3. Liga Nord	4	30	16	7	7	865:786	+79	39:21
2016/17	3. Liga Ost	2	30	22	3	5	844:713	+131	47:13
2017/18	2. Bundesliga	18	38	8	5	25	954:1051	−97	21:51
2018/19	3. Liga Nord	2	30	24	2	4	893:780	+113	50:10
2019/20	3. Liga Nord	4	25	15	1	9	721:679	+42	31:19
2020/21	3. Liga Nord
2021/22	3. Liga Nord	2	22	17	1	4	614:525	+89	35:9
2022/23	3. Liga Ost	2	24	15	3	6	740:688	+52	33:15
2023/24	3. Liga Nord-West	1	30	28	1	1	1018:832	+186	57:3
2024/25	3. Liga Nord-West	1	30	29	0	1	1056:790	+266	58:2

Promotion
Relegation

== Notable former players ==
- (Germany) Sven-Sören Christophersen
- (Germany) Michael Krieter
- (Germany) Sven Lakenmacher
- (Germany) Klaus-Dieter Petersen
- (Germany) Björn Navarin
- (Russia) Vyacheslav Gorpishin
- (Russia) Aleksandr Tuchkin
- (Russia) Igor Chumak
- (Croatia) Goran Jerković
- (Poland) Tomasz Tłuczyński
- (Lithuania) Arūnas Vaškevičius
- (Lithuania) Gintautas Vilaniškis
- (Austria) Markus Wagesreiter
