= Tettey Banfro =

Slovenian handball player

Personal information
- Full name: Tettey-Sowah Banfro
- Nationality: Slovenian
- Born: 30 April 1969 (age 57) Slovenj Gradec, SFR Yugoslavia
- Height: 1.90 m (6 ft 3 in)

Sport
- Sport: Handball
- Position: Right back

Senior clubs
- Years: Team
- 1985–1987: Celje
- 1987–1991: Metaloplastika
- 1991–1993: Zagreb
- 1993–1998: ZMC Amicitia Zürich
- 1998–1999: TV Grosswallstadt
- 1999–2000: Celje
- 2000–2002: Prevent Slovenj Gradec
- 2002–2003: Zagreb
- 2004–2005: Grasshoppers
National team
Years	Team		
–	Yugoslavia		
–	Slovenia	71	(236)
Medal record
Men's handball
Representing Slovenia
Mediterranean Games
Bronze medal – third place	1993 Languedoc-Roussillon	Team

Tettey-Sowah Banfro (born 30 April 1969) is a Slovenian former handball player.

== Early life ==
Banfro was born to a Slovenian mother and a Ghanaian father.

== Club career ==
After playing for Celje, Banfro was transferred to Yugoslav champions Metaloplastika in 1987, aged 18. He spent four seasons in Šabac, helping the team defend the Yugoslav Championship title in his debut season. In 1991, Banfro moved to Croatian club Zagreb, becoming back-to-back European Cup winner in 1992 and 1993.

== International career ==
At international level, Banfro represented Slovenia in two European Championships (1994 and 2000). He also participated in the 2000 Summer Olympics.

== Personal life ==
Banfro is the father of fellow handball player Filip Banfro.

== Honours ==
Metaloplastika

- Yugoslav Handball Championship: 1987–88

Zagreb

- European Cup: 1991–92, 1992–93

Celje

- Slovenian First League: 1999–2000
- Slovenian Cup: 1999–2000
