= Lee Gyu-chang (handballer) =

South Korean handball player (born 1972)

Personal information
- Nationality: South Korean
- Born: 18 February 1972 (age 53)

Sport
- Sport: Handball

Lee Gyu-chang (born 18 February 1972) is a South Korean handball player. He competed in the men's tournament at the 1992 Summer Olympics.
