= Luis Eduardo García =

Spanish handball player (born 1966)

Personal information
- Nationality: Spanish
- Born: 4 March 1966 (age 59); Seville, Spain

Sport
- Sport: Handball

Luis Eduardo García (born 4 March 1966) is a Spanish handball player. He competed in the men's tournament at the 1992 Summer Olympics.
