= Frank von Behren =

German handball player (born 1976)

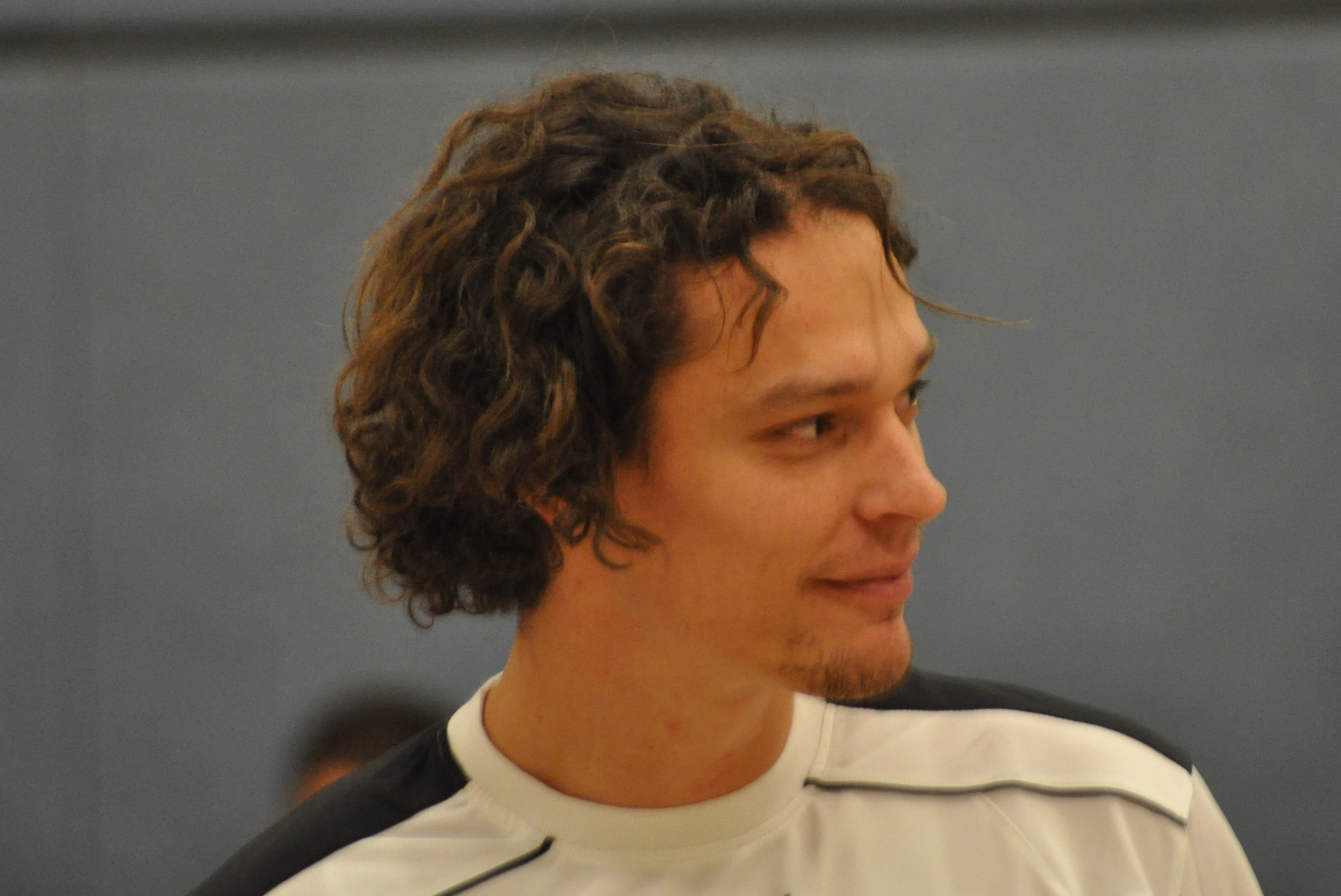
- Frank von Behren in 2010

Personal information
- Nationality: German
- Born: 28 September 1978 (age 48) Hille, Germany
- Height: 1.98 m (6 ft 6 in)

Sport
- Sport: Handball
- Position: Left back / Centre back
- Current club: Retired

Youth career
- Years: Team
- 1981–1994: TV Sachsenroß Hille
- 1994–1995: GWD Minden

Senior clubs
- Years: Team
- 1995–2003: GWD Minden
- 1997: → TSG Bielefeld (loan)
- 2003–2006: VfL Gummersbach
- 2006–2008: SG Flensburg-Handewitt
- 2008: GWD Minden
National team
Years	Team	Apps	(Gls)
1997–2008	Germany	168	(356)

Teams managed
- 2016: Bergischer HC
Medal record
Representing Germany
Men's Handball
Olympic Games
Silver medal – second place	2004 Athens	Team Competition
European Championship
Silver medal – second place	2002 Sweden	Team competition

Frank von Behren (born 28 September 1976 in Hille) is a retired German team handball player.

== Club career ==
Von Behren played professionally for GWD Minden (1996–2003), VfL Gummersbach (2003–2006), SG Flensburg-Handewitt (2006–2008) and again Minden (2008). He reached the EHF Champions League final in 2007 with Flensburg, where they lost to archrivals THW Kiel.

Sustaining a broken thumb on top of a severe shoulder injury, von Behren ended his playing career on 1 August 2008.

== International career ==
On 10 March 1998 von Behren made his international debut for Germany in a match against Sweden in Ellwangen. Until 2008, he played 167 games for the national team, scoring 356 goals. From 2001 to 2003 he captained the German national team. He received a silver medal at the 2004 Summer Olympics in Athens. Prior to that, he had received a silver medal at the 2002 European championship.

== Personal life ==
Von Behren is married and has three children. In 2008 he started studying sport management in Oldenburg. Von Behren worked as a pundit for Eurosport's German language coverage of the EHF Champions League. As of the 2014–15 season he does the same job for Sky Deutschland.
