= GWD Minden =

German handball club

- Full name: Turn- und Sportverein Grün-Weiß Dankersen-Minden e. V.
- Founded: 31 May 1924; 102 years ago
- Arena: Kampa-Halle
- Capacity: 4,059
- Head coach: Aaron Ziercke
- League: Handball-Bundesliga
- 2025–26: 17th of 18 (relegated)
- Club colours
Home	Away

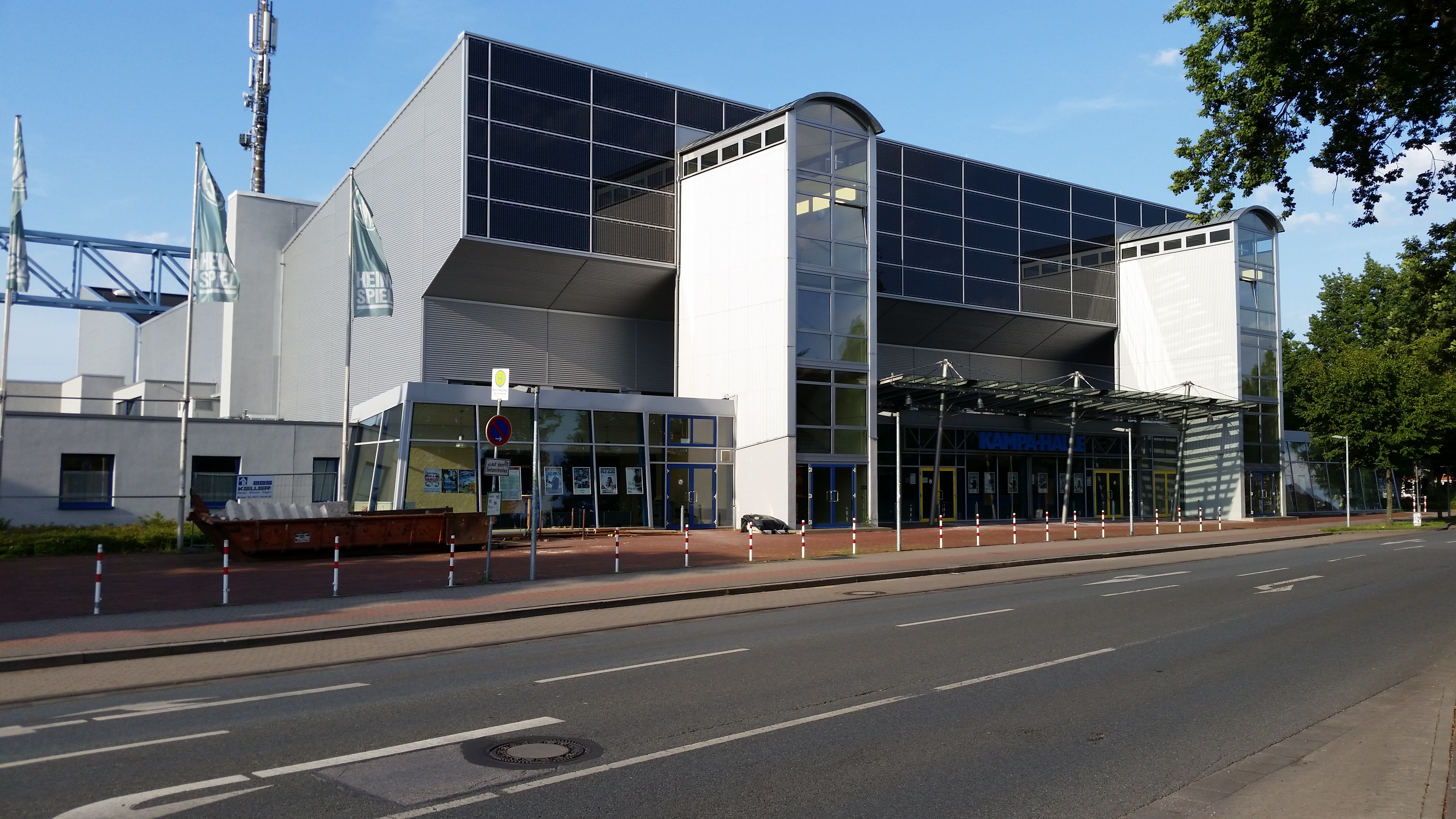
Kampa Hall

Grün-Weiß Dankersen-Minden, commonly known as GWD Minden, is a handball club from Minden, Germany, and is competing in the Handball-Bundesliga.

== History ==
The club was founded on 31 May 1924 in Dankersen, a town of circa 5000 inhabitants. The team started in the 1928-29 season in the local league.

== Crest, colours, supporters ==
=== Kits ===
HOME
2016–17	2017–18	2018–19

AWAY
2015–16	2016–17	2017–18	2018–19

== Accomplishments ==
- National Championship of Germany:
  - Gold: 1971, 1977
  - Silver: 1965, 1975, 1976
- 2. Handball-Bundesliga:
  - Gold: 1982, 1995, 2012
  - Silver: 2016
- National Cup of Germany:
  - Gold: 1975, 1976, 1979
- EHF Cup Winners' Cup:
  - Silver: 1976
- German Championship: (Field handball)
  - Gold: 1967, 1970, 1971
  - Silver: 1962, 1964, 1965, 1969
- IHF European Cup: (Field handball)
  - Gold: 1968, 1969, 1970

== Team ==
=== Staff ===
Staff for the 2022–23 season

Nationality	Position	Name
(Germany)	Head coach	Frank Carstens
(Germany)	Goalkeeper coach	Marco Stange
(Germany)	Team leader	Gerrit Holland
(Germany)	Physiotherapist	Philipp Roessler
(Germany)	Physiotherapist	Britta Wagner

=== Current squad ===
Squad for the 2022–23 season

Goalkeeper

- 1 (Germany) Malte Semisch
- 55 (Israel) Yahav Shamir

Wingers
LW

- 5 (Germany) Florian Kranzmann
- 11 (Germany) Mats Korte

RW

- 27 (Germany) Max Staar
- 50 (Slovakia) Tomáš Urban

Pivots

- 3 (Norway) Besard Hakaj
- 6 (Germany) Justus Nicolas Richtzenhain
- 15 (Iceland) Sveinn Jóhannsson
- 39 (Spain) Carles Asensio Cambra

Back players
LB

- 19 (Germany) Philipp Ahouansou
- 23 (Turkey) Doruk Pehlivan
- 31 (Serbia) Marko Vignjević
- 77 (Germany) Fynn Hermeling

CB

- 4 (Germany) Maximilian Janke
- 14 (Germany) Niclas Pieczkowski
- 24 (Germany) Magnus Holpert
- 71 (Tunisia) Mohamed Darmoul

RB

- 9 (Germany) Ole Günther
- 40 (Croatia) Luka Šebetić
- (Poland) Szymon Działakiewicz

=== Transfers ===
Transfers for the 2026–27 season

Joining

- (Germany) Antonio Metzner (RB) from (Germany) HC Erlangen

Leaving

- (Germany) Tom Bergner (LP) to (Germany) Bergischer HC
- (Germany) Malte Donker (RB) to (Germany) TVB Stuttgart
- (Germany) Niclas Heitkamp (LB) to (Germany) TV Emsdetten
- (Germany) Keno Danzenbächer (GK) to (Germany) Ahlener SG

=== Transfer History ===
Transfers for the 2025–26 season

Joining

- (Serbia) Tibor Ivanišević (GK) from (Germany) Frisch Auf Göppingen
- (Czech Republic) Jakub Štěrba (RW) from (Germany) ASV Hamm-Westfalen
- (Lithuania) Karolis Antanavičius (LB) from (Austria) Alpla HC Hard
- (Denmark) Morten Hempel Jensen (LB) from (Denmark) Skanderborg AGF Håndbold
- (Denmark) Daniel Astrup Pedersen (LP) from (Sweden) OV Helsingborg HK
- (Germany) Malte Donker (RB) from (Germany) ThSV Eisenach
- (Russia) Azat Valiullin (LB) from (Germany) HSV Hamburg
- (Germany) Mika Sajenev (LP) from (Germany) HSG Nordhorn-Lingen
- (Germany) Mats Haberkamp (GK) from (Germany) TUSEM Essen

Leaving

- (Serbia) Danilo Radović (LB) to (France) US Créteil Handball
- (Sweden) Adam Nyfjäll (LP) to (Germany) TBV Lemgo
- (Spain) Carles Asensio Cambra (LP) to (Spain) Eón Alicante
- (Germany) Benedikt Kühn (CB) to (Germany) ASV Hamm-Westfalen
- (Germany) Lucas Grabitz (GK) (retires)
- (Russia) Azat Valiullin (LB) to (Germany) HSV Hamburg

Transfers for the 2023–24 season

Joining

- (Serbia) Danilo Radović (LB) from (Serbia) RK Dinamo Pančevo
- (Hungary) Benedek Éles (LB) from (Hungary) Fejér B.Á.L. Veszprém
- (Iceland) Bjarni Valdimarsson (LB) from (Sweden) IFK Skövde

Leaving

- (Germany) Philipp Ahouansou (LB) end of loan from (Germany) Rhein-Neckar Löwen
- (Germany) Magnus Holpert (CB) to (Denmark) SønderjyskE Herrehåndbold
- (Germany) Maximilian Janke (CB) to (Germany) HC Elbflorenz Dresden
- (Germany) Ole Günther (RB) to (Germany) TuS N-Lübbecke

== Notable former players ==
- (Germany) Michael Haaß 2007-2009
- (Germany) Juri Knorr (2019–2021)
- (Germany) Klaus-Dieter Petersen (1986–1988)
- (Germany) Herbert Lübking (1949-1970)
- (Sweden) Andreas Cederholm (2017–2019)
- (Sweden) Martin Frändesjö (1998–2000)
- (Sweden) Magnus Jernemyr (2014-2017)
- (Sweden) Johan Petersson (1996-1997)
- (Russia) / (Spain) Talant Dujshebaev (1998-2001)
- (Norway) Magnus Gullerud (2016–2020)
- (Norway) Kevin Gulliksen (2018-2021)
- (Iceland) Sigurður Bjarnason (1996-1997)
- (France) Stéphane Stoecklin (1996-1998)
- (Slovenia) Luka Žvižej (2017-2019)

== Coaching History ==
- (Germany) Walter Hein (1947–1953)
- (Germany) Erich Klose (1953–1959, 1961–4/1966)
- (Germany) Karl-Heinz Nickel † (1959–1961)
- (Germany) Gerd Enders † (4/1966–12/1968)
- (Germany) Arnhold Kresse † (1/1969–4/1970)
- (Germany) Gerhard Steinhöfer (4/1970–1970)
- (Germany) Friedrich Spannuth (1970–1975, 1977–5/1978, 1987–5/1988)
- (Germany) Hans-Jürgen Sulk † (1975–1976)
- (Serbia) Vitomir Arsenijević (1976–1977, 1982–1985)
- (Croatia) Vinko Dekaris (8/1978–4/1979)
- (Germany) Horst Bredemeier (4/1979–1982)
- (Croatia) Milorad Reljić (1985–10/1985)
- (Germany) Günter Meyer (10/1985–1987)
- (Germany) Heinz Brockmeier (5/1988–10/1989)
- (Germany) Wolfgang Böhme (10/1989–3/1991)
- (Germany) Günter Gieseking (3/1991–1991, 1/1999–2/1999)
- (Germany) Dietmar Molthahn (1991–4/1992, 2/1995–5/1995, 3/1997–5/1997)
- (Germany) Milomir Mijatović † (6/1992–3/1995)
- (Germany) Jürgen Kloth (6/1995–1996)
- (Poland) Zenon Łakomy † (5/1996–2/1997)
- (Germany) Michael Biegler (5/1997–1/1999)
- (Russia) Aleksandr Rymanov (2/1999–3/2003)
- (Germany) Rainer Niemeyer † (3/2003–10/2004)
- (Croatia) Velimir Kljaić † (10/2004–2005)
- (Germany) Richard Ratka (2005–2/2010)
- (Germany) Frank von Behren (2/2010) (one game)
- (Sweden) Ulf Schefvert (2/2010–3/2013)
- (Croatia) Sead Hasanefendić (3/2013–2013)
- (Croatia) Goran Perkovac (2013–2/2015)
- (Germany) Frank Carstens (2/2015–6/2023)
- (Iceland) Aðalsteinn Eyjólfsson (7/2023–1/2024)
- (Germany) Aaron Ziercke (1/2024-)

== Club Captain history ==
- (Germany) Arnhold Kresse † (–1964)
- (Germany) Friedrich Spannuth (1964–1966)
- (Germany) Herbert Lübking (1966–1970)
- (Germany) Manfred Horstkötter (1970–1972)
- (Germany) Wilfried Drögemeier (1972–1975)
- (Germany) Hans Kramer † (1975–1979)
- (Germany) Rainer Niemeyer † (1979–1984)
- (Germany) Wilhelm Südmeier (1984–5/1986)
- (Germany) Fido Gast (5/1986–1988)
- (Germany) Detlef Meyer (1988–1990)
- (Germany) Gerd Amann (1990–1991)
- (Germany) Rüdiger Borchardt (1991–10/1991)
- (Germany) Herbert Pohl (10/1991–1992)
- (Germany) Frank Schoppe (1992–1994)
- (Germany) Walter Schubert (1994–1995)
- (Sweden) Robert Hedin (1995–1998)
- (Germany) Frank Löhr (1998–2000)
- (Germany) Jörg-Uwe Lütt (2000–11/2000)
- (Germany) Frank von Behren (11/2000–2003)
- (Germany) Aaron Ziercke (2003–2004)
- (Iceland) Patrekur Jóhannesson (2004–2005)
- (Germany) Arne Niemeyer (2005–2008)
- (Germany) Jan-Fiete Buschmann (2008–2009)
- (Germany) Moritz Schäpsmeier (2009–2010, 2015–2017)
- (Germany) Aljoscha Schmidt (2010–2011)
- (Latvia) Evars Klešniks (2011–2013)
- (Denmark) Anders Oechsler (2013–2014)
- (Germany) Jens Vortmann (2014–2015)
- (Sweden) Dalibor Doder (2017–2019)
- (Germany) Marian Michalczik (2019–2020)
- (Serbia) Miljan Pušica (2020–2021)
- (Germany) Niclas Pieczkowski (2021–2023)
- (Germany) Malte Semisch (2023-)
