= Super Bock Arena =

Sports arena in Porto, Portugal

Super Bock Arena Pavilhão Rosa Mota
- The renovated arena in December 2025
- Interactive map of Super Bock Arena; Pavilhão Rosa Mota
- Former names: Pavilhão dos Desportos
- Location: Lordelo do Ouro e Massarelos, Porto, Portugal
- Coordinates: 41°08′48.76″N 8°37′33.56″W
- Owner: Municipality of Porto
- Capacity: 8,500
- Surface: Parquet

Construction
- Groundbreaking: 1951–52
- Opened: 1954
- Renovated: Completed 2019
- Architect: José Carlos Loureiro

The Super Bock Arena (Pavilhão Rosa Mota) is a cultural and sports arena in Porto, Portugal.

== History ==
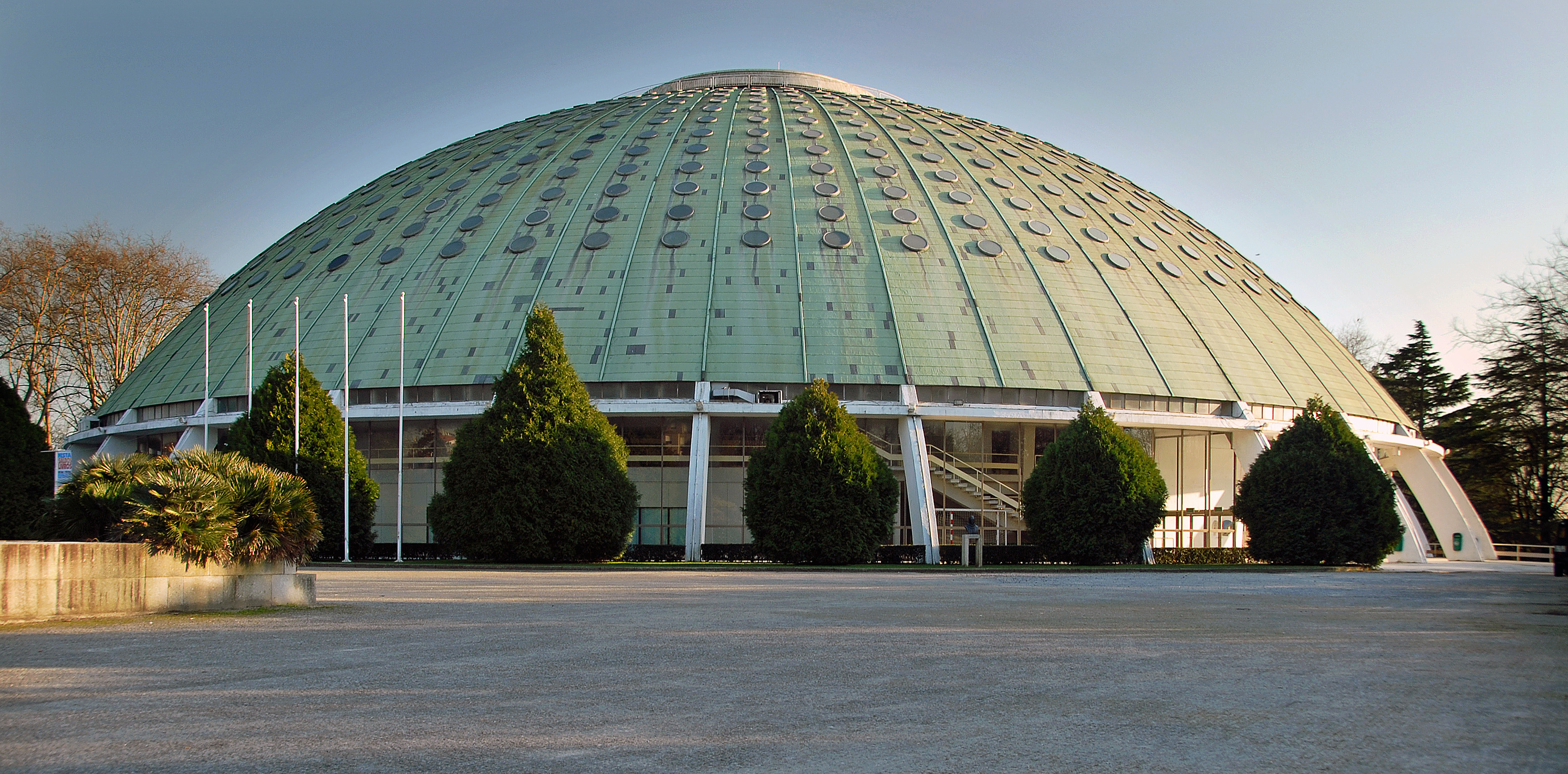
The pavilion/arena in February 2009

The pavilion opened in 1954 on the site of Porto's Crystal Palace (Palácio de Cristal), demolished in 1951 to make room for the pavilion. It was previously known as Pavilhão dos Desportos. In 1991, it was renamed after Portuguese, European, World and Olympic marathon running champion Rosa Mota.

In 2014, after a public call for tenders, a consortium between Lucios and PEV Entertainment was responsible for the rehabilitation of the arena. The initial cost of the rehabilitation was 8 million euros.

In November 2018, Porto's Municipal Chamber announced that following a naming agreement with Super Bock, the company's name was to be added to the arena, in the course of the 20-year private concession of the space.

The rehabilitation process was concluded in 2019. The arena now has the capacity to undertake events up to 8,000 people and is branded Super Bock Arena.

Besides cultural and sports events, the arena can now also function as a congress centre.

== See also ==
- List of indoor arenas in Portugal

| Preceded by None | European Men's Handball Championship; Final Venue; 1994 | Succeeded by Palacio San Pablo; Seville |
