= Dămienești =

- Commune
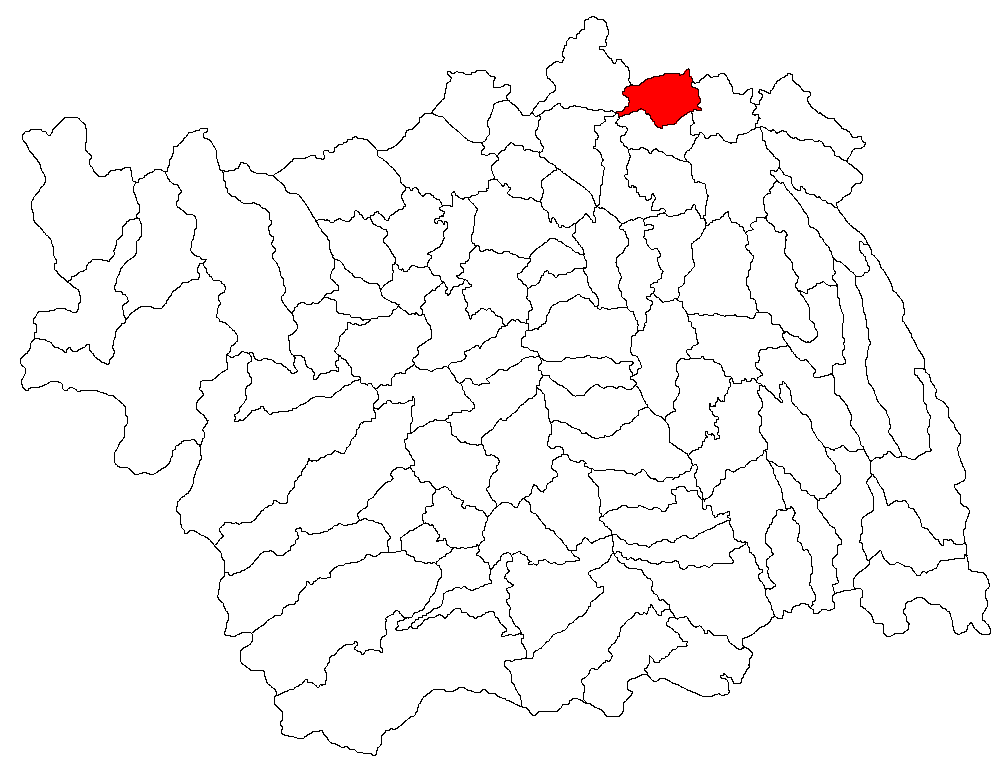
- Location in Bacău County

- Location in Romania
- Coordinates: 46°44′N 26°59′E
- Country: Romania
- County: Bacău

Government
  - Mayor (2024–2028): Vasilică-Cătălin Răileanu (PSD)
- Area: 29.02 km^{2} (11.20 sq mi)
- Elevation: 198 m (650 ft)
- Population (2021-12-01): 1,614
  - Density: 56/km^{2} (140/sq mi)
- Time zone: EET/EEST (UTC+2/+3)
- Postal code: 607135
- Area code: +(40) 234
- Vehicle reg.: BC
- Website: primariadamienesti.ro

Dămienești is a commune in Bacău County, Western Moldavia, Romania. It is composed of four villages: Călugăreni, Dămienești, Drăgești, and Pădureni.

Historical population
Year	Pop.	±%
2002	1,911	—
2011	1,715	−10.3%
2021	1,614	−5.9%
Source: Census data

== Natives ==
- Dumitru Berbece (born 1961), handball coach and former player
