= Richard Ratka =

German handball player (born 1963)

Personal information
- Full name: Richard Hermann Ratka
- Nationality: German
- Born: 26 November 1963 (age 62) Dortmund, West Germany
- Height: 195 cm (77 in)

Sport
- Sport: Handball
- Position: Right back

Youth career
- Years: Team
- –: SG Massen

Senior clubs
- Years: Team
- 1983-1986: HC TuRa Bergkamen
- 1986-1996: TuRU Düsseldorf
National team
Years	Team	Apps	(Gls)
1986-?	Germany	71	(182)

Teams managed
- 1998-2004: HSV Düsseldorf
- 2004-2005: VfL Gummersbach
- 2005-2010: GWD Minden-Hannover
- 2011-2012: DHC Rheinland
- 2013-2016: SG Ratingen 2011

Richard Hermann Ratka (born 26 November 1963) is a German former handball player and handball coach. He was a member of the Germany men's national handball team. He was part of the team at the 1992 Summer Olympics, playing six matches. On club level he played for TuRU Düsseldorf in Düsseldorf.

== Career ==
Ratke started playing handball at SG Massen. In 1983 he joined TuRa Bergkamen in the Handball-Bundesliga, where he played for three years before joining TuRU Düsseldorf, where he played for 10 years. In total he played 290 Bundesliga matches; 245 for Düsseldorf and 45 for Bergkamen. He scored 1209 league goals in total. With Turu Düsseldorf he won the 1989 EHF European League.

After his playing days he became a handball coach. From 1998 to 2004 he coached HSG Düsseldorf. Afterwards he joined VfL Gummersbach for a single season.

From 2005 to February 2010 he coached GWD Minden. In the summer of 2011 he took over at the second Bundesliga team DHC Rheinland.

In August 2013 he took over at the 3. Liga team SG Ratingen 2011. In 2014 he was promoted with the team. In 2016 he resigned due to personal reasons.
