= Vasily Kudinov =

Russian handball player

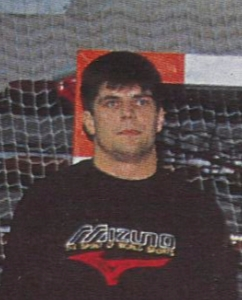

Personal information
- Full name: Vasily Alexandrovich Kudinov
- Nationality: Russian
- Born: 17 February 1969 Ilyinka, Astrakhan Oblast, Soviet Union
- Died: 11 February 2017 (aged 47) Astrakhan, Russia
- Height: 195 cm (77 in)

Sport
- Sport: Handball
- Position: Left back

Senior clubs
- Years: Team
- 1987–1992: Dynamo Astrakhan
- 1992–1997: US Ivry Handball
- 1997–2000: VfL Hameln
- 2000–2001: SC Magdeburg
- 2001–2004: Honda Suzuki
- 2004–2005: Dynamo Astrakhan
National team
Years	Team		
1990–1992	Soviet Union		
1992	Unified Team	7	(9)
1992–2004	Russia	189	(615)
Medal record
Men's handball
Representing the Unified Team
Olympic Games
Gold medal – first place	1992 Barcelona	Team
Representing Russia
Olympic Games
Gold medal – first place	2000 Sydney	Team competition
Bronze medal – third place	2004 Athens	Team competition
World Championships
Gold medal – first place	1993 Sweden	Team
Gold medal – first place	1997 Japan	Team
Silver medal – second place	1999 Egypt	Team
European Championship
Gold medal – first place	1996 Spain	Team
Silver medal – second place	1994 Portugal	Team

Vasily Alexandrovich Kudinov (Russian: Василий Александрович Кудинов, 17 February 1969 – 11 February 2017) was a Russian handball player, born in Ilyinka, Astrakhan Oblast, Russian SFSR. He has won all three major international tournaments; European and World Championships and Olympic gold.

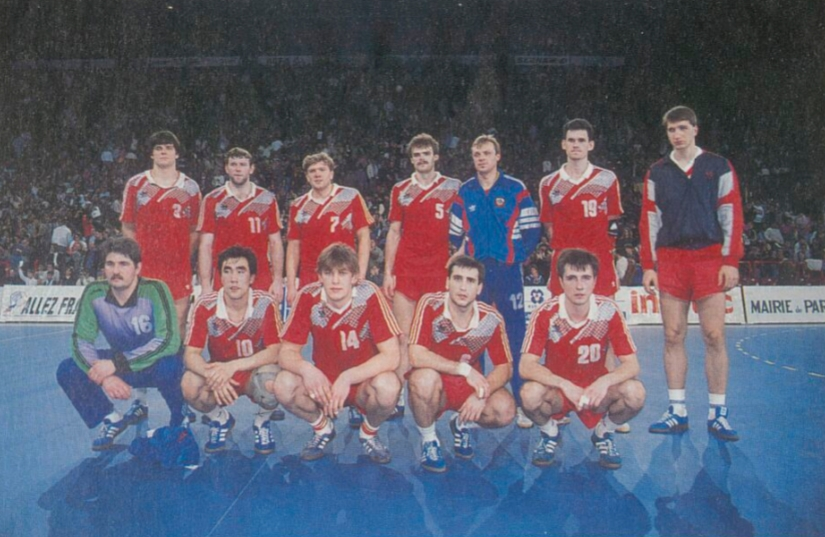
The CIS team in 1992

Kudinov died on 11 February 2017, six days prior to his 48th birthday, in Astrakhan.

== Career ==
Kudinov started his career at his hometown club Dinamo Astrakhan, where he won the 1990 Soviet Men's Handball Championship. In 1992 he joined French team US Ivry Handball, where he won the 1996 Coupe de France and the 1997 French Championship.

In 1997 he joined VfL Hameln in the German Bundesliga. In 2000 he signed for league rivals SC Magdeburg, where he won the German Championship and the EHF Cup in his only season at the club. He then joined Japanese team Honda Suzuki. Here he played until 2004, when he returned to Dynamo Astrakhan for his last season of his career.

== National team ==
In 1989 he won the U21 World Championship with the Soviet youth team. He made his debut for the senior team in 1990.

He participated in three Olympics, winning two gold medals and one bronze medal. At the 1992 Summer Olympics he won a gold medal with the Unified Team at the Olympics. He also played for the Russia men's national handball team at the 2000 Summer Olympics in Sydney, where Russia won the gold medal.

At the 1993 World Men's Handball Championship he won gold medals. At the 1994 European Championship he won another gold medal, and was the tournament top scorer.

At the 1997 World Championship he won his second World Cup gold and was included in the tournament all-star team. At the 1999 World Championship he won only silver, but was once again included in the all-star team.

== Private ==
His son Sergey Kudinov is also a professional handball player.
