= Klaus-Dieter Petersen =

German handball player (born 1968)

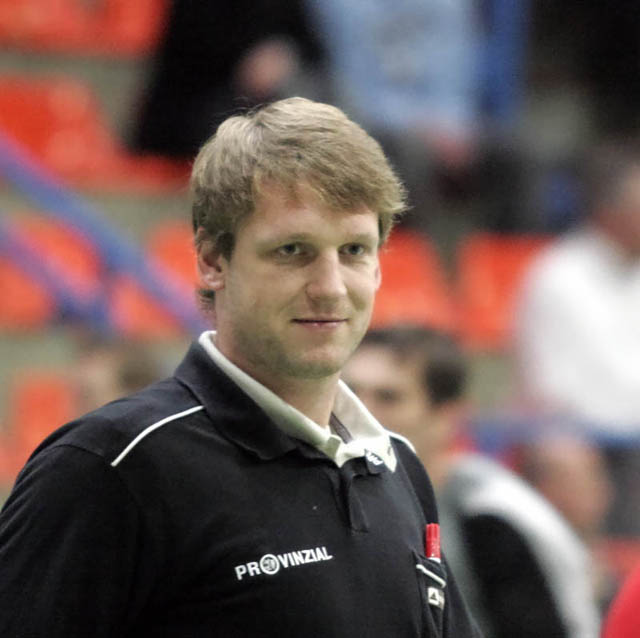
- Petersen on December 30, 2006 in Aschaffenburg

Personal information
- Born: 6 November 1968 (age 57) Hannover, Germany

Sport
- Sport: Handball
- Position: Pivot

Youth career
- Years: Team
- 1972-1984: SG Misburg
- 1984-1986: TSV Anderten

Senior clubs
- Years: Team
- 1986-1988: GWD Minden
- 1988-1993: VfL Gummersbach
- 1993-2005: THW Kiel
- 2008: Wilhelmshavener HV
National team
Years	Team	Apps	(Gls)
1989-2004	Germany	340	(253)

Teams managed
- 2005-2023: Germany youth teams
- 2003-2008: THW Kiel assistant
- 2008-2010: Wilhelmshavener HV
- 2010-2012: Eintracht Hildesheim Second team
- 2012-2014: THW Kiel youth teams
- 2012-2015: TSV Altenholz
- 2015-: THW Kiel youth teams
Medal record
Olympic Games
Silver medal – second place	2004 Athens	Team Competition
World Men's Handball Championship
Silver medal – second place	2003 Portugal	Team competition
European Championship
Gold medal – first place	2004 Slovenia	Team competition
Silver medal – second place	2002 Sweden	Team competition

Klaus-Dieter Petersen (born November 6, 1968) is a former German team handball player and current trainer for the youth team of the German club THW Kiel, where he played himself. He received a silver medal at the 2004 Summer Olympics in Athens with the German national team. He is European champion from 2004.

== Career ==
Petersen started playing at SG Misburg and later TST Anderten. In 1986 he joined second tier side GWD Minden, where he would make his professional debut. In 1988 he joined Handball-Bundesliga team VfL Gummersbach. Five years later he joined THW Kiel. Here he won the German Bundesliga 8 times and the DHB-Pokal 3 times.

He debuted for the German national team in November 1989 against DDR. His last match was October 19th 2004. Behind Frank-Michael Wahl he has the second most matches for the German national team.

== Coaching career ==
In 2003 he became player-assistant coach at THW Kiel. Then he retired as a player, he continued as the assistant under Zvonimir Serdarušić. He then moved to Wilhelmshavener HV, where he in addition to being the coached, also played two matches for them in 2008.

From 2011 he was the player-coach of Eintracht Hildesheim. From 2012 to 2015 he coached TSV Altenholz, where he was promoted to the second Bundesliga in 2013.

In 2015 he became the youth coordinator at his on his old team THW Kiel.

Since 2005 he has also been a youth coach at the German national team. At the 2023 U-21 World Championship he acted as the assistant coach to Martin Heuberger.
