= José Luiz Vieira =

Brazilian handball player (born 1959)

Personal information
- Born: 22 August 1959 (age 65); Maringá, Brazil

Sport
- Sport: Handball

José Luiz Vieira (born 22 August 1959) is a Brazilian former handball player. He competed in the men's tournament at the 1992 Summer Olympics.
