= Gheorghe Răduță =

Romanian handball player (born 1967)

Personal information
- Nationality: Romanian
- Born: 7 December 1967 (age 58)

Sport
- Sport: Handball

Gheorghe Răduță (born 7 December 1967) is a Romanian handball player. He competed in the men's tournament at the 1992 Summer Olympics.
