= Sérgio Carnasciali =

Brazilian handball player (born 1964)

Personal information
- Born: 6 June 1964 (age 60); Curitiba, Brazil

Sport
- Sport: Handball

Sérgio Carnasciali (born 6 June 1964) is a Brazilian handball player. He competed in the men's tournament at the 1992 Summer Olympics.
