= Mitică Bontaș =

Romanian handball player (born 1970)

Personal information
- Nationality: Romanian
- Born: 12 January 1970 (age 56)

Sport
- Sport: Handball

Mitică Bontaș (born 12 January 1970) is a Romanian handball player. He competed in the men's tournament at the 1992 Summer Olympics.
