= Michael Krieter =

German handball player (born 1963)

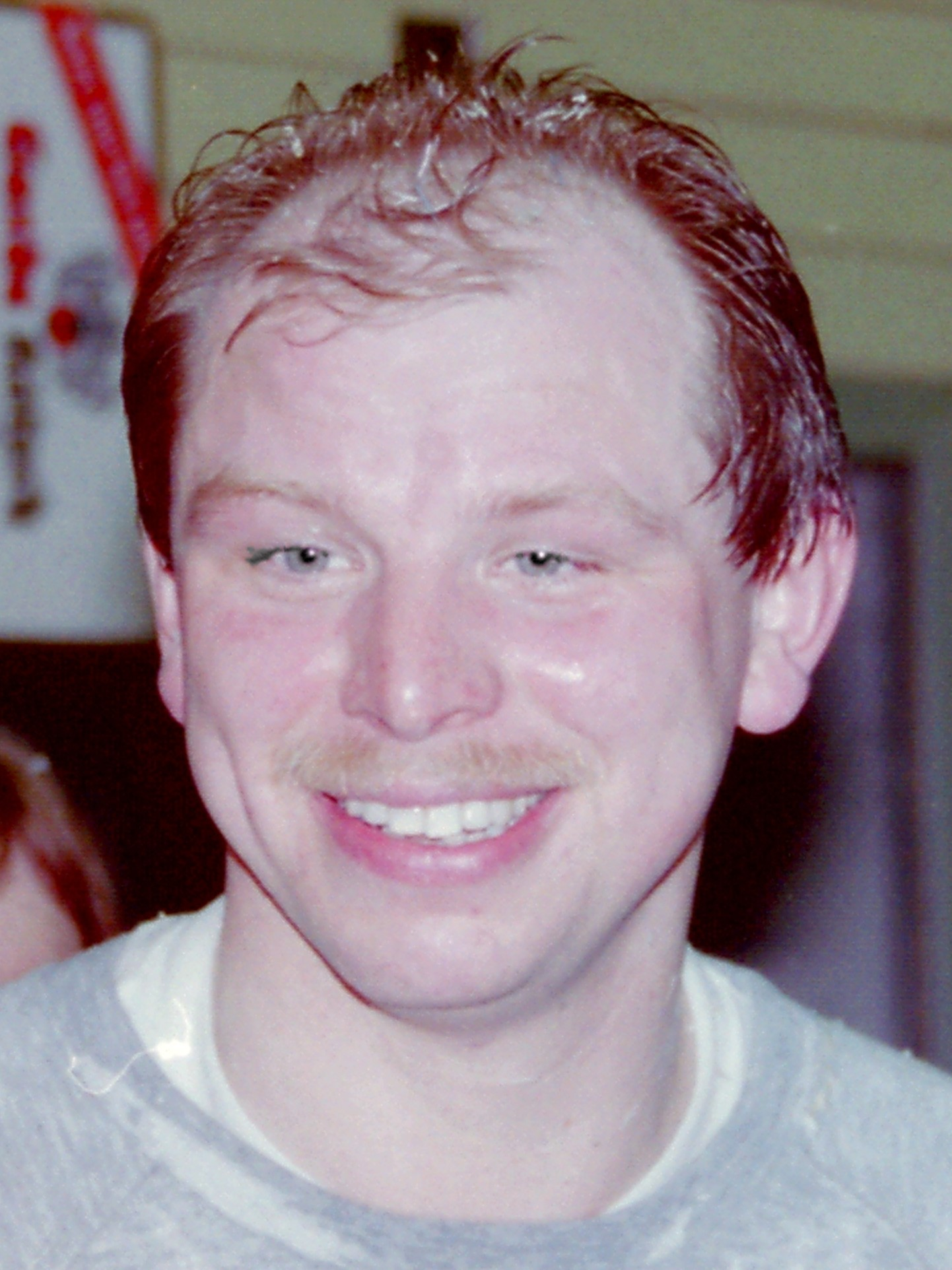

Personal information
- Nickname: Pumpe
- Nationality: German
- Born: 21 August 1963 (age 63) Northeim
- Height: 191 cm (75 in)

Sport
- Sport: Handball
- Position: Goalkeeper

Senior clubs
- Years: Team
- 1982-1983: TuS Nettelstedt
- 1983-1998: THW Kiel
- 1998-2000: Eintracht Hildesheim
- 2000-2003: SV Post Schwerin
- 2005: Füchse Berlin
- 2007: VfL Bad Schwartau
- 2008: SV Mönkeberg
- 2010-2014: Preetzer TSV
National team
Years	Team	Apps	(Gls)
1986-?	Germany	92	(0)

Teams managed
- 2008-2010: SV Mönkeberg
- 2010-2014: Preetzer TSV
- 2015-2016: SG HC Bremen/Hastedt
- 2017-2019: SG HC Bremen/Hastedt

Michael Krieter (born 21 August 1963) is a German former handball player. He was a member of the Germany men's national handball team. He was part of the team at the 1992 Summer Olympics, playing four matches. On club level he played for THW Kiel in Kiel for the most of his career, and one 4 German championships with the club.

After his playing career he has been the coach of multiple lower league clubs.

His son Moritz Krieter is also a handball player.
