= Maximilian Janke =

German handball player (born 1993)

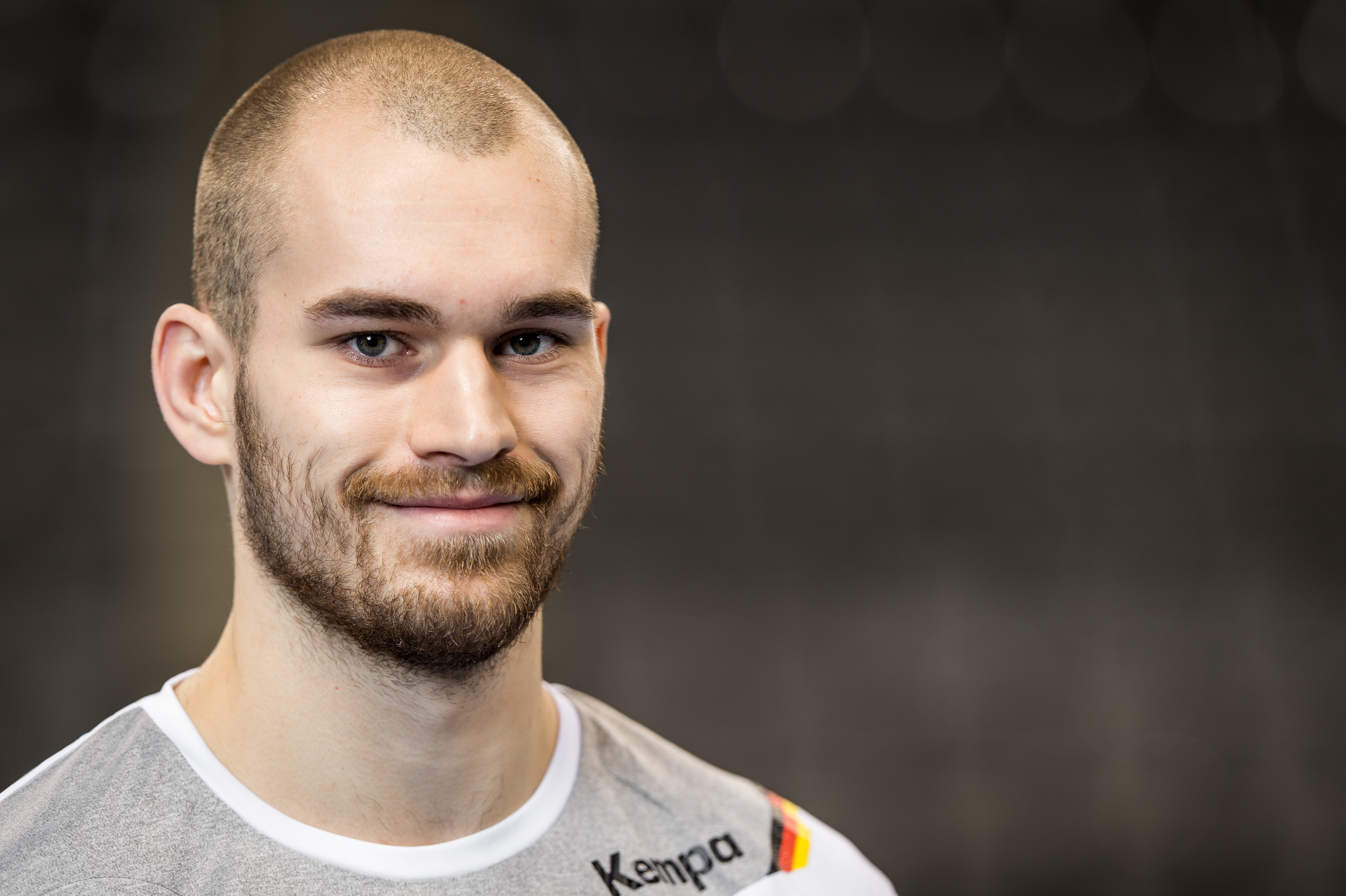

Personal information
- Nationality: German
- Born: 28 February 1993 (age 33) Pfaffenhofen, Germany
- Height: 1.95 m (6 ft 5 in)

Sport
- Sport: Handball
- Position: Centre back
- Current club: SC DHfK Leipzig
- Number: 13

Youth career
- Years: Team
- –: TSV Dorfmark
- –2008: MTV Soltau
- 2008–2010: SC Magdeburg

Senior clubs
- Years: Team
- 2010–2015: SC Magdeburg
- 2015–2021: SC DHfK Leipzig
- 2021–2023: GWD Minden
- 2023–2024: HC Elbflorenz
National team
Years	Team	Apps	(Gls)
2018	Germany	7	(1)

Maximilian Janke (born 28 February 1993) is a German former handball player, who played for the German national team.

He participated at the 2018 European Men's Handball Championship.
