= Jani Likavec =

Slovenian handball player

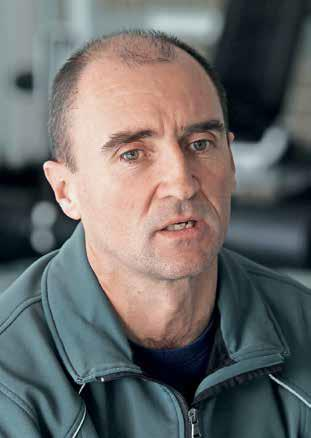
- Likavec in 2015

Personal information
- Nationality: Slovenia
- Born: 10 March 1968 (age 58) Trebnje
- Height: 190 cm (75 in)

Sport
- Sport: Handball

Senior clubs
- Years: Team
- ?-?: Trimo Trebnje
National team
Years	Team	Apps
?-?	Slovenia	7
- Updated on only during the 2000 Summer Olympics

Jani Likavec (born 10 March 1968) is a Slovenian male handball player. He was a member of the Slovenia men's national handball team. He was part of the team at the 2000 Summer Olympics, playing seven matches. On club level he played for Trimo Trebnje in Trebnje.
