= Bergsveinn Bergsveinsson =

Icelandic handball player (born 1968)

Personal information
- Full name: Bergsveinn Sig Bergsveinsson
- Nationality: Icelandic
- Born: 25 January 1968 (age 58)

Sport
- Sport: Handball
- Position: Goalkeeper
- Current club: Retired
National team
Years	Team	Apps	(Gls)
–	Iceland	153	(0)

Bergsveinn Bergsveinsson (born 25 January 1968) is an Icelandic former handball player who competed in the 1992 Summer Olympics.
