= Héðinn Gilsson =

Icelandic handball player (born 1969)

Personal information
- Nationality: Icelandic
- Born: 22 September 1969 (age 57) Iceland
- Height: 202 cm (80 in)

Sport
- Sport: Handball
- Position: Left back
National team
Years	Team	Apps	(Gls)
–	Iceland	138	(300)

Héðinn Gilsson (born 22 September 1969) is an Icelandic former handball player who competed in the 1992 Summer Olympics. Here Gilsson finished 4th with the Iceland team.

In 1990 he won the Icelandic Championship with FH Hafnarfjörður.
