= Alberto Urdiales =

Spanish handball player (born 1968)

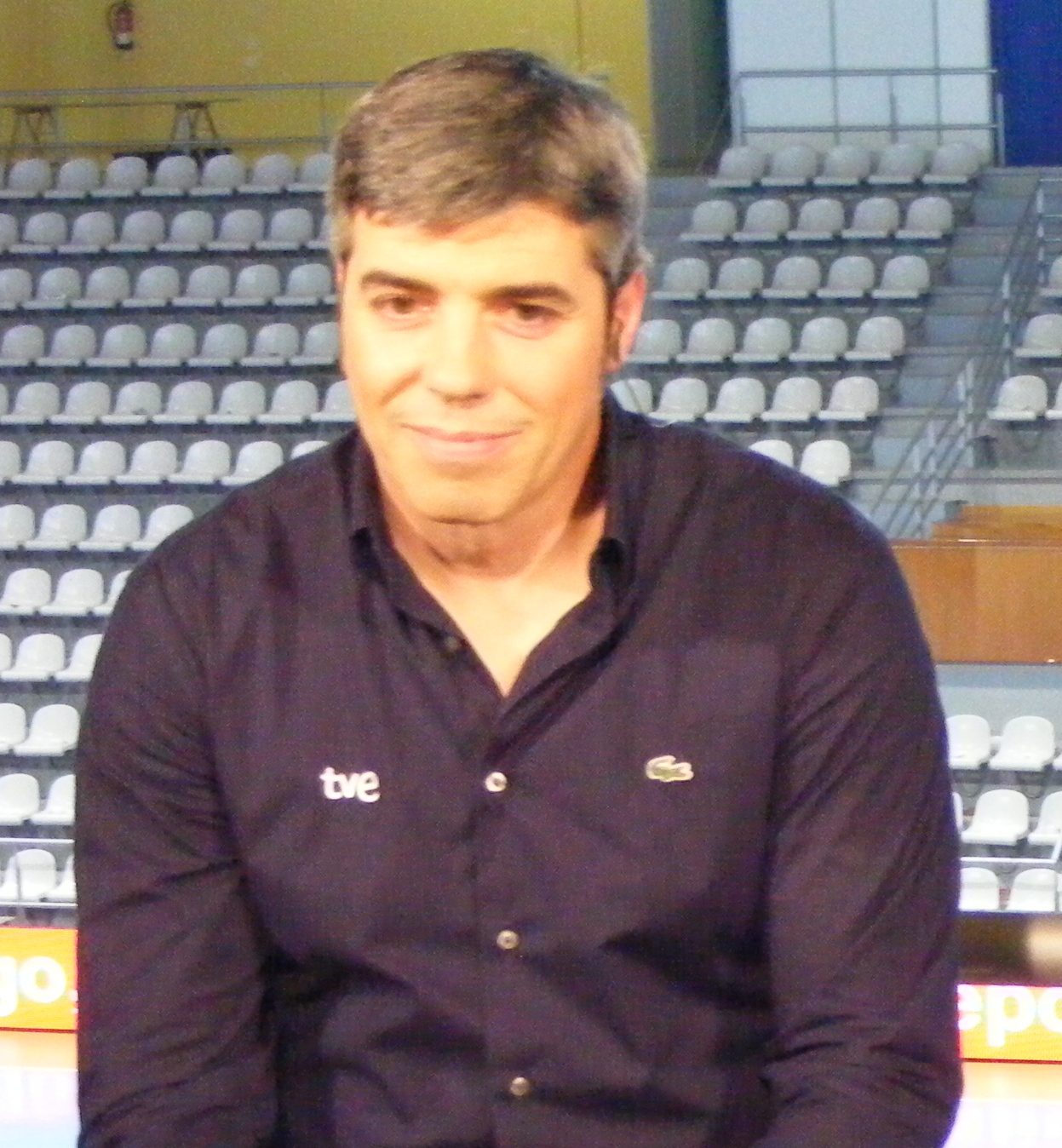
- Alberto Urdiales in 2011

Personal information
- Born: 17 November 1968 (age 57) Santander, Cantabria, Spain
- Height: 179 cm (70 in)

Sport
- Sport: Handball
- Position: Right wing

Youth career
- Years: Team
- –: CB Cantabria

Senior clubs
- Years: Team
- 1986–1993: Atlético Madrid BM
- 1993–2001: CB Cantabria
- 2001–2004: Portland San Antonio
National team
Years	Team	Apps	(Gls)
1991–2000	Spain	142	(438)

Teams managed
- 2004–2006: CB Cantabria
Medal record
Men's Handball
Representing Spain
Olympic Games
Bronze medal – third place	1996 Atlanta	Team
Bronze medal – third place	2000 Sydney	Team
European Championship
Silver medal – second place	1996 Spain
Silver medal – second place	1998 Italy
Bronze medal – third place	2000 Croatia

Alberto Urdiales Márquez (born 17 November 1968) is a Spanish handball player. He competed in the 1992, 1996, and 2000 Olympics.

His brother, Santiago Urdiales, is also a handballer.

== Career ==
Urdiales started his career at Atlético Madrid BM, where he won the 1986-87 Copa del Rey de Balonmano and the 1987-88 Supercopa ASOBAL.

In 1993 he joined his childhood club CB Cantabria. Here he won the Spanish Championship and the Champions League in 1993–94, the Copa del Rey and Supercopa ASOBAL in 1995, the Supercoba for a third time in 1997 and the EHF Cup Winners' Cup in 1998.

In 2001 he signed for Portland San Antonio. Here he won another Spanish Championship and Supercup in 2001-02 and the EHF Cup Winners' Cup in 2003–04. In the 2002-03 EHF Champions League he reached the final with San Antonio, but lost to French team Montpellier HB.

After retiring he became the head coach of CB Cantabria, where he was until 2006. During his tenure, the team finished 11th and 13th in his two seasons.

=== National team ===
In 1987 and in 1989 Urdiales won gold medals at the IHF Men's U21 Handball World Championship. He was also part of the Spanish team that won gold medals at the 1987 Mediterranean Games.

He made his debut for the Spanish senior team on 10 January 1991 in a 27–22 win over Switzerland.

In 1992, he was a member of the Spanish handball team which finished fifth in the Olympic tournament. He played four matches and scored 30 goals.

He also represented Spain at the 1994 European Men's Handball Championship. In 1996, he won silver medals at the 1996 European Men's Handball Championship, losing to Russia in the final. Later the same year, he won the Olympic bronze medal with the Spanish team in the 1996 Olympics. He played all seven matches and scored 31 goals.

At the 1998 European Men's Handball Championship he won his second European silver medal in a row with Spain, losing to Sweden in the final this time.

At the 2000 Games, he won his second Olympic bronze medal as part of the Spanish team. He played three matches and scored one goal. At the 2000 European Championship he won another bronze medal, when Spain lost to Sweden in the semifinal and beat France in the third-place playoff.
