= Erik Hajas =

Swedish handball player (born 1962)

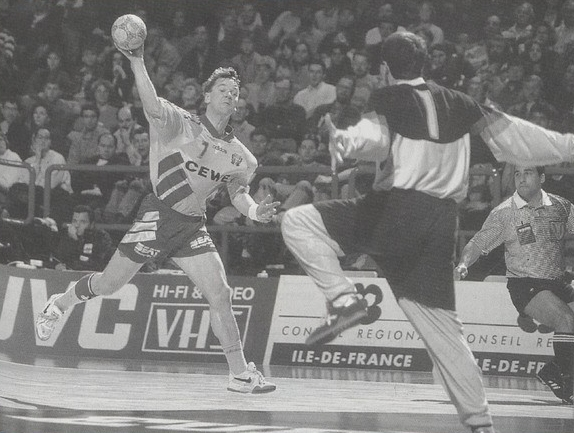
- Erik Hajas in 1995.

Personal information
- Full name: Laszlo Erik Hajas
- Nationality: Swedish
- Born: 16 September 1962 (age 64) Huddinge, Sweden
- Height: 1.82 m (6 ft 0 in)

Sport
- Sport: Handball
- Position: Left wing

Youth career
- Years: Team
- –1979: IFK Tumba Handboll
- 1979–1981: SoIK Hellas

Senior clubs
- Years: Team
- 1981–1988: SoIK Hellas
- 1988–1990: IF Guif
- 1990–1991: CB Maritim Puerto Cruz
- 1991–1992: IFK Tumba
- 1992–2000: IF Guif
National team
Years	Team	Apps	(Gls)
1984–1997	Sweden	181	(993)

Teams managed
- 2005–2009: IFK Tumba
Medal record
Olympic Games
Silver medal – second place	1992 Barcelona	Team
Silver medal – second place	1996 Atlanta	Team
European Championship
Gold medal – first place	1994 Portugal
Gold medal – first place	1998 Italy
Gold medal – first place	2000 Croatia
World Championship
Gold medal – first place	1990 Czechoslovakia
Gold medal – first place	1999 Egypt
Bronze medal – third place	1993 Sweden
Bronze medal – third place	1995 Iceland
Silver medal – second place	1997 Japan

Erik Hajas (born 16 September 1962) is a Swedish former handball player and handball coach. During the 1980s and 1990s he was one of the best wing players in the world. He won the 1990 World Championship and the 1994 European Championship, and he competed in the 1988 Summer Olympics, in the 1992 Summer Olympics, and in the 1996 Summer Olympics, where Sweden won silver medals both times.

He had the nickname 'Hajen' (the shark).

== Club career ==
As a senior player he played for SoIK Hellas and IF Guif in Sweden as an amateur player. He later went professional at the Spanish club CB Maritim Puerto Cruz for one season in 1990–91. Afterwards he returned to his childhood club IFK Tumba in the Swedish Division 1. He has been the top scorer in the Swedish top division six times. In total he scored 1986 goals for his various clubs, which was the record until he was overtaken by Zoran Roganović. In 1994 he became the third player to score 17 goals in a Swedish league match.

== National team ==
In 1981 Hajas played for youth national team matches. He debuted for the senior team on 26 October 1984 against Iceland.

In 1988 he was a member of the Swedish handball team which finished fifth in the Olympic tournament. He played all six games and scored 21 goals. In 1990 he won the World Championship, which was a bit of a sensation. In 1992 he was part of the Swedish team which won the silver medal at the 1992 Olympics. He played six matches and scored 30 goals. In 1994 he won the European Championship.

At the 1996 Games he won his second silver medal with the Swedish team. He played six matches and scored 30 goals.

== Post-playing career ==
After his playing days he has been the coach at his former club IFK Tumba. Otherwise he has worked as a fire fighter.

== Achievements ==
- Top scorer in the Swedish top league: 1986–87, 1988–89, 1994–95, 1995–96, 1996–97 and 1997–98.
- Swedish Handballer of the Year 1995
