= Gunnar Andrésson =

Icelandic handball player (born 1970)

Personal information
- Nationality: Icelandic
- Born: 28 November 1970 (age 55)

Sport
- Sport: Handball
- Current club: Retired
National team
Years	Team	Apps	(Gls)
–	Iceland	26	(27)

Gunnar Andrésson (born 28 November 1970) is an Icelandic former handball player who competed in the 1992 Summer Olympics.
