= Einar Sigurðsson (handballer) =

Icelandic handball player (born 1971)

Personal information
- Nationality: Icelandic
- Born: 2 July 1971 (age 55)

Sport
- Sport: Handball
- Current club: Retired
National team
| Years | Team | Apps | (Gls) |
| – | Iceland | 12 | (0) |

Einar Sigurðsson (born 2 July 1971) is an Icelandic former handball player who competed in the 1992 Summer Olympics.
