= Konráð Olavsson =

Icelandic handball player (born 1968)

Konráð Olavsson (born 11 March 1968) is an Icelandic former handball player who competed in the 1992 Summer Olympics, where Iceland finished 4th.

At club level he played for HSG Dortmund and TV Niederwürzbach in Germany and UMF Stjarnan in his home country. In the 1997-98 DHB-Pokal he reached the final with TV Niederwürzbach, where they lost to THW Kiel.

He played 174 games for the Iceland national team.
