= Dumitru Berbece =

Romanian handball player (born 1961)

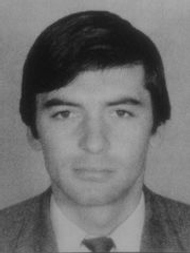
- Berbece pictured in the 1980s

Personal information
- Born: 2 January 1961 (age 65) Dămienești, Romania
- Height: 185 cm (6 ft 1 in)
- Weight: 79 kg (174 lb)

Sport
- Sport: Handball
- Club: Steaua Bucharest; CB Alzira; SG Leutershausen
Medal record
Representing Romania
Olympic Games
Bronze medal – third place	1984 Los Angeles	Team
World Championships
Bronze medal – third place	1990 Czechoslovakia	Team

Dumitru Marian Berbece (born 2 January 1961) is a Romanian handball coach and former player. Competing at two Olympics and four world championships he won bronze medals at the 1984 Olympics and 1990 World Championships. At the club level he played for Steaua Bucharest, Alzira Valencia and SG Leutershausen in Germany.
