= Juan Francisco Alemany =

Spanish handball player (born 1963)

Personal information
- Full name: Juan Francisco Alemany Marín
- Nationality: Spanish
- Born: 12 November 1963 Valencia, Spain
- Height: 199 cm (78 in)

Sport
- Sport: Handball
- Position: Left back
National team
Years	Team	Apps	(Gls)
1987-??	Spain	115	(275)

Juan Francisco Alemany Marín (born 12 November 1963) is a Spanish former handball player. He was a member of the Spain men's national handball team. He was part of the team at the 1992 Summer Olympics, playing six matches.
