= Birgir Sigurðsson (handballer) =

Icelandic handball player (born 1965)

Personal information
- Nationality: Icelandic
- Born: 4 September 1965 (age 61)

Sport
- Sport: Handball
- Current club: Retired
National team
Years	Team	Apps	(Gls)
–	Iceland	105	(195)

Birgir Sigurðsson (born 4 September 1965) is an Icelandic former handball player who competed in the 1992 Summer Olympics.
