= Zoltán Bergendi =

Slovak handball player (born 1969)

Zoltán Bergendi (born 21 March 1969 in Šaľa) is a Slovak former handball player of Hungarian ethnicity who competed for Czechoslovakia in the 1992 Summer Olympics.
