= Sigurður Bjarnason (handballer) =

Icelandic handball player (born 1970)

Sturla Ásgeirsson
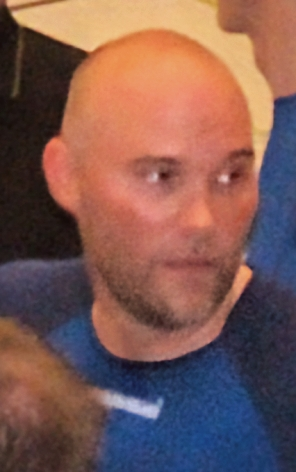
- Bjarnason in 2011

Personal information
- Nationality: Icelandic
- Born: 1 December 1970 (age 55) Garðabær, Iceland

Sport
- Sport: Handball
- Position: Left back

Senior clubs
- Years: Team
- -1991: UMF Stjarnan
- 1991-1994: TV Großwallstadt
- 1994-1996: UMF Stjarnan
- 1996-1997: GWD Minden
- 1997-1999: VfL Bad Schwartau
- 1999-2003: HSG D/M Wetzlar
National team
Years	Team	Apps	(Gls)
–	Iceland	163	(320)

Teams managed
- 2003-: UMF Stjarnan

Sigurður Bjarnason (born 1 December 1970) is an Icelandic former handball player and handball coach who competed in the 1992 Summer Olympics.

In 1991 he switched from UMF Stjarnan to the German Bundesliga side TV Großwallstadt. In 2001 he reached the German cup final with HSG D/M Wetzlar.

In 2003 he became the coach of his former club UMF Stjarnan, where he won the Icelandic Men's Handball Cup in 2006.
