= Robert Licu =

Romanian handball player (born 1969)

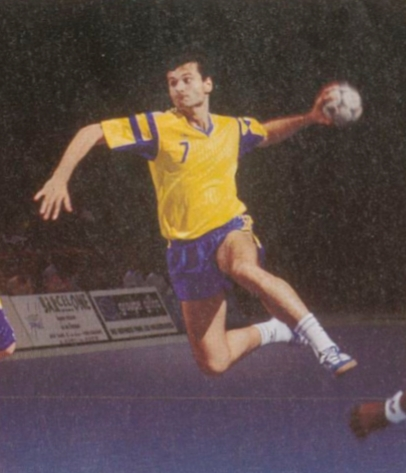

Personal information
- Full name: Robert Ioan Licu
- Nationality: Romanian
- Born: 7 May 1969 (age 57)
- Height: 1.96 m (6 ft 5 in)

Sport
- Sport: Handball
- Position: Right back
- Current club: Rapid București (manager)

Senior clubs
- Years: Team
- –1990: Dinamo București
- 1990–1993: Universitatea Craiova
- 1993–1998: SC Magdeburg
- 1998–1999: ThSV Eisenach
- 1999–2003: SV Post Schwerin
- 2003–2004: SC Magdeburg
National team
Years	Team	Apps	(Gls)
–	Romania	243	(1054)

Teams managed
- 2011: CSM București
- 2013: CSM București
- 2014: Romania (assistant)
- 2018–: Rapid București
Medal record
World Championship
Bronze medal – third place	1990 Czechoslovakia
World University Championship
Silver medal – second place	1990 Netherlands

Robert Ioan Licu (born 7 May 1969) is a Romanian professional handball manager and former player who played as a right back. Licu is the manager of Liga Națională club Rapid București. He is the son of Ghiță Licu.

== Achievements ==
- Liga Națională:
  - Winner (2): 1992, 1993
- Cupa României:
  - Winner (2): 1988, 1991
- DHB-Pokal:
  - Winner (1): 1996
- DHB-Supercup:
  - Winner (1): 1996
- World Championship:
  - Bronze Medalist: 1990
- World University Championship:
  - Silver Medalist: 1990
- Carpathian Trophy:
  - Winner (2): 1991, 1995

== See also ==
- List of men's handballers with 1000 or more international goals
