= Cho Chi-hyo =

South Korean handball player (born 1970)

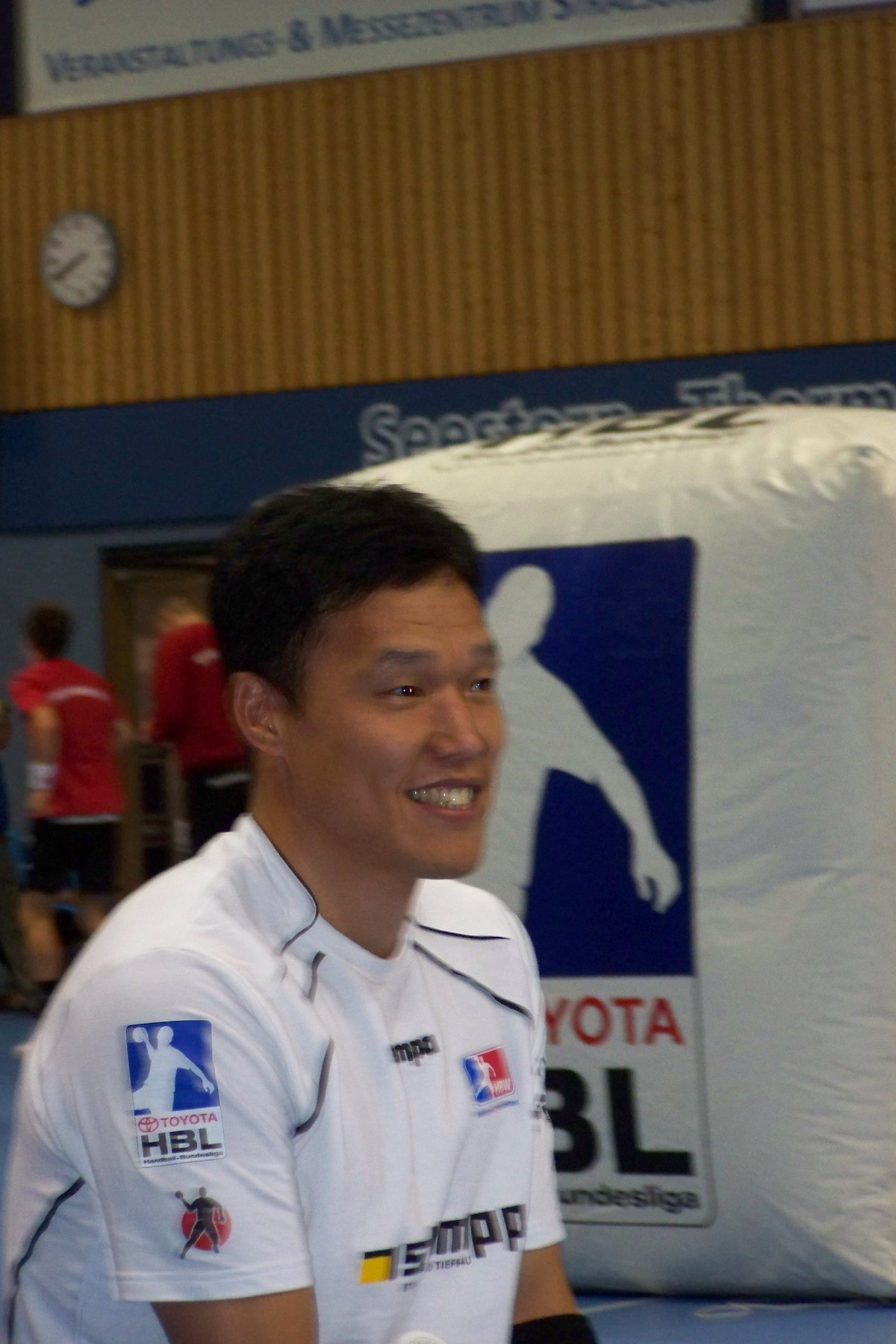

Personal information
- Nationality: South Korea
- Born: December 6, 1970 (age 55) Incheon, South Korea
- Height: 1.94 m (6 ft 4 in)

Sport
- Sport: Handball

Senior clubs
- Years: Team
- ?-?: (South Korea) Hankuk Physical Univ.
- ?-?: (South Korea) Korean N. College
- 1995–2004: (Switzerland) Pfadi Winterthur
- 2004–2006: (Switzerland) Kadetten Schaffhausen
- 2006–2007: (Switzerland) Wacker Thun
- 2007–2009: (Germany) HBW Balingen
- 2009–2010: (South Korea) Incheon DTC
National team
- Years: Team
- 1989–2008: South Korea
Medal record
Asian Games
Gold medal – first place	1994 Hiroshima	Team Competition
- Updated on 13 January 2009

- Cho Chi-hyo
- Hangul: 조치효
- RR: Jo Chihyo
- MR: Cho Ch'ihyo

Cho Chi-hyo (Korean: 조치효; born December 6, 1970, in Incheon, South Korea) is a South Korean former handball player.

Cho was a runner-up for top goal scorer (45 goals in 6 games) at the 1992 Summer Olympics held in Barcelona, Spain, where the South Korea men's national handball team finished in the 6th place. He was eventually named to the All-Star Team of the competition.

After winning a gold medal at the 1994 Asian Games in Hiroshima, Japan, he moved to the Swiss Handball League in October 1994. For 13 years in Switzerland, he led his teams to the league champions eight times, winning two scoring titles and one league MVP.

In 2007, Cho moved to Germany to play for HBW Balingen-Weilstetten in the Handball-Bundesliga. In 2008, he was selected for the South Korea men's national handball team at the age of 38, and led his team to the quarterfinals of the 2008 Summer Olympics in Beijing, China.
