= Handball at the 1996 Summer Olympics – Men's team squads =

List of handball players

The following squads and players competed in the men's handball tournament at the 1996 Summer Olympics.

== Algeria ==
The following players represented Algeria:

- Amar Daoud
- Abdel Ghani Loukil
- Redouane Aouachria
- Salim Nedjel-Hammou
- Nabil Rouabhi
- Redouane Saïdi
- Ben Ali Beghouach
- Sofiane Lamali
- Abdeldjalil Bouanani
- Mahmoud Bouanik
- Rabah Gherbi
- Achour Hasni
- Sofiane Khalfallah
- Mohamed Bouziane
- Salim Abes
- Karim El-Mahouab

== Brazil ==
The following players represented Brazil:

- Cezar Stelzner de Lima
- Edison Alves Freire
- Ivan Raimundo Pinheiro
- Marcos Antônio Cezar
- José Ronaldo do Nascimento
- Fausto Steinwandter
- Paulo Moratore
- Milton Fonseca Pelissari
- Daniel Pinheiro
- Agberto Correa de Matos
- Marcelo Minhoto Ferraz de Sampaio
- Winglitton Rocha Barros
- Ivan Bruno Maziero
- Rodrigo Hoffelder
- Osvaldo Inocente Filho
- Carlos Luciano Ertel

== Croatia ==
The following players represented Croatia:

- Patrik Ćavar
- Valner Franković
- Slavko Goluža
- Bruno Gudelj
- Vladimir Jelčić
- Božidar Jović
- Nenad Kljaić
- Venio Losert
- Valter Matošević
- Zoran Mikulić
- Alvaro Načinović
- Goran Perkovac
- Iztok Puc
- Zlatko Saračević
- Irfan Smajlagić
- Vladimir Šujster

== Egypt ==
The following players represented Egypt:

- Ahmed El-Awady
- Ahmed El-Attar
- Ahmed Ali
- Hosam Abdallah
- Mahmoud Soliman
- Gohar Al-Nil
- Yasser Mahmoud
- Khaled Mahmoud
- Ayman El-Alfy
- Mohamed Bakir El-Nakib
- Amro El-Geioushy
- Ashraf Mabrouk Awaad
- Ayman Abdel Hamid Soliman
- Ahmed Belal
- Saber Hussein
- Sameh Abdel Waress

== France ==
The following players represented France:

- Eric Amalou
- Grégory Anquetil
- Stéphane Cordinier
- Yohan Delattre
- Christian Gaudin
- Stéphane Joulin
- Guéric Kervadec
- Denis Lathoud
- Pascal Mahé
- Bruno Martini
- Gaël Monthurel
- Raoul Prandi
- Jackson Richardson
- Philippe Schaaf
- Stéphane Stoecklin
- Frédéric Volle

== Germany ==
The following players represented Germany:

- Andreas Thiel
- Christian Scheffler
- Christian Schwarzer
- Daniel Stephan
- Holger Löhr
- Jan Fegter
- Jan Holpert
- Karsten Kohlhaas
- Klaus-Dieter Petersen
- Markus Baur
- Martin Schmidt
- Martin Schwalb
- Stefan Kretzschmar
- Thomas Knorr
- Volker Zerbe

== Kuwait ==
The following players represented Kuwait:

- Abbas Al-Harbi
- Abdul Razzaq Al Balushi
- Adel Al-Nahham
- Bandar Al-Shammari
- Ismael Shah Al-Zadah
- Khaldoun Al-Khashti
- Khaled Al-Mulla
- Mishal Al-Ali
- Naser Al-Otaibi
- Qaied Al-Adwani
- Salah Al-Marzouq
- Salem Al-Marzouq

== Russia ==
The following players represented Russia:

- Aleksey Frantsuzov
- Andrey Lavrov
- Dmitry Filippov
- Dmitri Torgovanov
- Igor Lavrov
- Lev Voronin
- Oleg Grebnev
- Oleg Kiselyov
- Oleg Kuleshov
- Pavel Sukosyan
- Sergey Pogorelov
- Valery Gopin
- Vasily Kudinov
- Vyacheslav Gorpishin

== Spain ==
The following players represented Spain:

- Talant Duyshebaev
- Salvador Esquer
- Aitor Etxaburu
- Jesús Fernández
- Jaume Fort
- Mateo Garralda
- Raúl González
- Rafael Guijosa
- Fernando Hernández
- José Javier Hombrados
- Demetrio Lozano
- Jordi Núñez
- Jesús Olalla
- Juan Pérez
- Iñaki Urdangarín
- Alberto Urdiales

== Sweden ==
The following players represented Sweden:

- Magnus Andersson
- Robert Andersson
- Per Carlén
- Martin Frändesjö
- Erik Hajas
- Robert Hedin
- Andreas Larsson
- Ola Lindgren
- Stefan Lövgren
- Mats Olsson
- Staffan Olsson
- Johan Petersson
- Tomas Svensson
- Tomas Sivertsson
- Pierre Thorsson
- Magnus Wislander

== Switzerland ==
The following players represented Switzerland:

- Carlos Lima
- Christian Meisterhans
- Daniel Spengler
- Marc Baumgartner
- Matthias Zumstein
- Nick Christen
- René Barth
- Robbie Kostadinovich
- Rolf Dobler
- Roman Brunner
- Stefan Schärer
- Urs Schärer
- Alex Vasilakis

== United States ==
The following players represented the United States:

- Derek Brown
- Greg Caccia
- David DeGraaf
- Yaro Dachniwsky
- Robert Dunn
- Denny Fercho
- Joe Fitzgerald
- Tom Fitzgerald
- Darrick Heath
- John Keller
- Cliff Mannon
- Steve Penn
- Matt Ryan
- Mark Schmocker
- Michael Thornberry
- Chip Van Os
