= Algeria at the 1996 Summer Olympics =

- IOC code: ALG
- NOC: Algerian Olympic Committee
- Website: www.coa.dz

in Atlanta
- Competitors: 45 (39 men and 6 women) in 9 sports
- Flag bearer: Karim El-Mahouab
- Medals Ranked 34th: Gold 2 Silver 0 Bronze 1 Total 3

Summer Olympics appearances (overview)
- 1964; 1968; 1972; 1976; 1980; 1984; 1988; 1992; 1996; 2000; 2004; 2008; 2012; 2016; 2020; 2024

Other related appearances
- France (1896–1960)

Algeria was represented at the 1996 Summer Olympics in Atlanta, Georgia, United States by the Algerian Olympic Committee.

In total, 45 athletes including 39 men and six women represented Algeria in nine different sports including athletics, boxing, fencing, handball, judo, rowing, swimming, weightlifting and wrestling.

Algeria won three medals at the games after Noureddine Morceli and Hocine Soltani won gold in the men's 1500 m and the men's lightweight boxing respectively and Mohamed Bahari won bronze in the men's middleweight boxing.

== Competitors ==
In total, 45 athletes represented Algeria at the 1996 Summer Olympics in Atlanta, Georgia, United States across nine different sports.

Sport	Men	Women	Total
Athletics	6	2	8
Boxing	6	–	6
Fencing	1	1	2
Handball	16	0	16
Judo	4	2	6
Rowing	0	1	1
Swimming	1	0	1
Weightlifting	3	–	3
Wrestling	2	–	2
Total	39	6	45

== Medalists ==
Algeria won a total of three medals at the games including two golds and one bronze.

Medal	Name	Sport	Event	Date
Gold	Noureddine Morceli	Athletics	Men's 1500 metres	3 August
Gold	Hocine Soltani	Boxing	Men's lightweight	4 August
Bronze	Mohamed Bahari	Boxing	Men's middleweight	1 August

== Athletics ==
In total, eight Algerian athletes participated in the athletics events – Aïssa Bel Aout, Réda Benzine, Hassiba Boulmerka, Amar Hecini, Ahmed Krama, Nouria Mérah-Benida and Noureddine Morceli.

Men

Track and road events

Athletes	Events	Heat Round 1		Heat Round 2		Semifinal		Final	
Athletes	Events	Time	Rank	Time	Rank	Time	Rank	Time	Rank
Amar Hecini	400 metres	DSQ		did not advance					
Amar Hecini	800 metres	1:47.23	26	N/A		did not advance			
Ahmed Krama	1500 metres	3:42.09	35	N/A		did not advance			
Noureddine Morceli	1500 metres	3:41.95	21 Q	N/A		3:32.88	1 Q	3:35.78	Gold medal
Aïssa Bel Aout	5000 metres	13:51.96	5 Q	N/A		14:04.56	15 Q	14:06.52	15
Réda Benzine	5000 metres	14:03.06	23 Q	N/A		13:37.52	8 q	13:42.34	13

Women

Track and road events

Athletes	Events	Heat Round 1		Heat Round 2		Semifinal		Final	
Athletes	Events	Time	Rank	Time	Rank	Time	Rank	Time	Rank
Nouria Mérah-Benida	800 metres	2:02.44	24	N/A		did not advance			
Hassiba Boulmerka	1500 metres	4:09.96	11 Q	N/A		4:23.86	23	did not advance	

== Boxing ==
In total, six Algerian athletes participated in the boxing events – Mohamed Alalou, Mehdi Assous, Mohamed Bahari, Abdelaziz Boulehia, Noureddine Madjhoud and Hocine Soltani.

Athlete	Event	Round of 32	Round of 16	Quarterfinal	Semifinal	Final
Athlete	Event	Opposition Result	Opposition Result	Opposition Result	Opposition Result	Opposition Result
Mehdi Assous	Flyweight	Gereo (PNG); W 11-4	Narváez (ARG); W 20-4	Lunka (GER); L 19-6	Did not advance	
Abdelaziz Boulehia	Bantamweight	Tsiripidis (GRE); W 10-6	Malakhbekov (RUS); L (RSC-3)	Did not advance		
Noureddine Madjhoud	Featherweight	Aragón (CUB); L 9-6	Did not advance			
Hocine Soltani	Lightweight	İşsever (TUR); W 14-2	Magalhães (BRA); W 11-1	Shin (KOR); W 16-10	Doroftei (ROM); W 9-6	Tontchev (BUL); W 3-3
Mohamed Alalou	Light-Middleweight	Bulinga (KEN); W 17-3	Bielski (POL); W 19-8	Missaoui (TUN); L 16-15	did not advance	
Mohamed Bahari	Middleweight	Marcus (BAR); W (RSC-2)	Kakauridze (GEO); W 8-5	Magee (IRL); W 15-9	Beyleroğlu (TUR); L 11-11	Did not advance

== Fencing ==
In total, two Algerian athletes participated in the fencing events – Raouf Salim Bernaoui and Ferial Salhi.

Athlete	Event	Round of 64	Round of 32	Round of 16	Quarterfinals	Semifinals	Final
Athlete	Event	Opposition Result	Opposition Result	Opposition Result	Opposition Result	Opposition Result	Opposition Result
Raouf Salim Bernaoui	Men's sabre individual	Covaliu (ROM); L 15-7	did not advance				
Ferial Salhi	Women's foil individual	Liang (CHN); L 15-7	did not advance				

== Handball ==
In total, 10 Algerian athletes participated in the handball – Salim Abes, Ben Ali Beghouach, Redouane Aouachria, Mohamed Bouziane, Abdeldjalil Bouanani, Mahmoud Bouanik, Amar Daoud, Karim El-Mahouab, Rabah Gherbi, Salim Nedjel Hammou, Achour Hasni, Sofiane Khalfallah, Sofiane Lamali, Abdelghani Loukil, Nabil Rouabhi and Redouane Saïdi.

Preliminary group B

Team	Pld	W	D	L	GF	GA	GD	Points
France	5	4	0	1	145	114	+31	8
Spain	5	4	0	1	114	97	+17	8
Egypt	5	3	0	2	113	103	+10	6
Germany	5	3	0	2	121	112	+9	6
Algeria	5	0	1	4	95	117	−22	1
Brazil	5	0	1	4	100	145	−45	1

24 July; 14:30	Egypt	19–16	Algeria

25 July; 10:00	France	33–22	Algeria

27 July; 10:00	Spain	20–14	Algeria

29 July; 14:30	Germany	25–23	Algeria

31 July; 19:00	Algeria	20–20	Brazil

9th Place Match

2 August; 10:00	United States	27–26	Algeria

== Judo ==
In total, six Algerian athletes participated in the judo events – Lyes Cherifi, Abdelhakim Harkat, Kamel Larbi, Lynda Mekzine, Amar Meridja and Salima Souakri.

Men

Athlete	Event	Result
Amar Meridja	Extra-Lightweight	9
Abdelhakim Harkat	Lightweight	13
Lyes Cherifi	Half-Middleweight	17
Kamel Larbi	Heavyweight	21

Women

Athlete	Event	Result
Salima Souakri	Extra-Lightweight	5
Lynda Mekzine	Half-Lightweight	9

== Rowing ==
In total, one Algerian athlete participated in the rowing events – Samia Hireche.

Women

Athlete(s)	Event	Heats		Repechage		Semifinals		Final	
Athlete(s)	Event	Time	Rank	Time	Rank	Time	Rank	Time	Rank
Samia Hireche	Single sculls	9:08.31	6	9:28.41	6	N/A		9:09.92	17

== Swimming ==
In total, one Algerian athlete participated in the swimming events – Salim Iles.

Men

Athletes	Events	Heat		Finals	
Athletes	Events	Time	Rank	Time	Rank
Salim Iles	50 m freestyle	23.61	36	Did not advance	
Salim Iles	100 m freestyle	50.87	25	Did not advance	
Salim Iles	200 m freestyle	1:54.10	31	Did not advance	

== Weightlifting ==
In total, three Algerian athletes participated in the weightlifting events – Azzedine Basbas, Fouad Bouzenada and Abdelmanaane Yahiaoui.

Athletes	Events	Snatch		Clean & Jerk		Total	Rank
Athletes	Events	Result	Rank	Result	Rank	Total	Rank
Azzedine Basbas	-64 kg	120	28	160	12	280	24
Fouad Bouzenada	-64 kg	115	29	152.5	26	267.5	29
Abdelmanaane Yahiaoui	-70 kg	150	7	185	4	335	5

== Wrestling ==
In total, two Algerian athletes participated in the wrestling events – Youssef Bouguerra and Omar Kedjaouer.

Freestyle

Athlete	Event	Round 1	Round 2	Quarterfinal	Semifinal	Final	Repechage Round 1	Repechage Round 2	Repechage Round 3	Repechage Round 4	Bronze Medal Bout
Athlete	Event	Opposition Result	Opposition Result	Opposition Result	Opposition Result	Opposition Result	Opposition Result	Opposition Result	Opposition Result	Opposition Result	Opposition Result
Omar Kedjaouer	-52 kg	Tohuzov (UKR); L 10-0	did not advance				Rodríguez (MEX); W 2-0	Topaktaş (TUR); L (fall)	did not advance		

Greco-Roman

Athlete	Event	Round 1	Round 2	Quarterfinal	Semifinal	Final	Repechage Round 1	Repechage Round 2	Repechage Round 3	Repechage Round 4	Bronze Medal Bout
Athlete	Event	Opposition Result	Opposition Result	Opposition Result	Opposition Result	Opposition Result	Opposition Result	Opposition Result	Opposition Result	Opposition Result	Opposition Result
Youssef Bouguerra	-74 kg	Katayama (JPN); L 13-2	did not advance				Stoyanov (BUL); L 5-0	did not advance			
