= Sead Hasanefendić =

Croatian handball coach

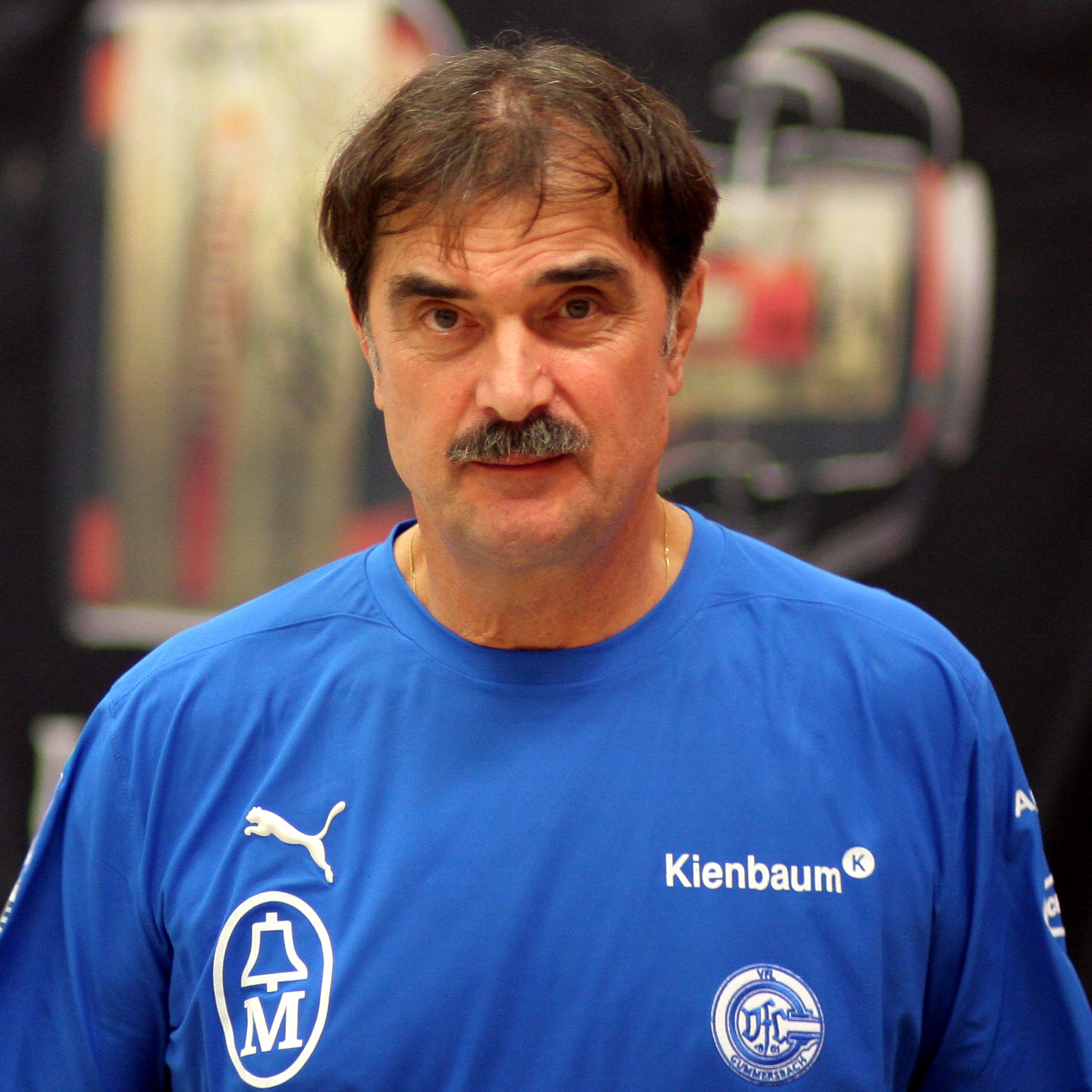
- Hasanefendić as VfL Gummersbach coach in August 2008

Personal information
- Full name: Sead Hasanefendić
- Nationality: Croatian
- Born: 1 August 1948 (age 78) Novi Sad, PR Serbia, FPR Yugoslavia

Sport
- Sport: Handball
- Current club: ThSV Eisenach (manager)

Teams managed
- Years: Team
- 1979: Yugoslavia
- 1979–1980: RK Metaloplastika
- 1980–1986: Switzerland
- 1987–1989: US Créteil
- 1989–1992: Vénissieux Handball
- 1993–1995: VfL Hameln
- 1995–1996: OM Vitrolles
- 1996–1997: US Ivry
- 1998–2000: RK Celje
- 2000–2002: Bosnia and Herzegovina
- 2000–2002: BM Granollers
- 2002–2004: VfL Gummersbach
- 2004–2008: Tunisia
- 2008–2011: VfL Gummersbach
- 2009–2010: Serbia
- 2013: GWD Minden
- 2014–2015: Tunisia
- 2015: Al Duhail
- 2015: TuS Nettelstedt-Lübbecke
- 2017: VfL Gummersbach
- 2018–: ThSV Eisenach

Sead Hasanefendić (born 1 August 1948) is a Croatian handball coach who is the head coach of ThSV Eisenach. He is of Bosnian descent.

== Playing career ==
Hasanefendić first hesitated between football and handball. At the age of 18, his parents left Novi Sad for Zagreb, where he again played handball. In 1969, he discovered France and returned there to learn the language. Contacted by AS Cannes while playing in Zagreb, he joined the French Riviera club in 1971. A vice-champion of Nationale 2 in 1974, Hasanefendić and the club thus evolve into Nationale 1 during the 1974–75 season. He then moved to SAS Guebwiller in 1976.

== Coaching career ==
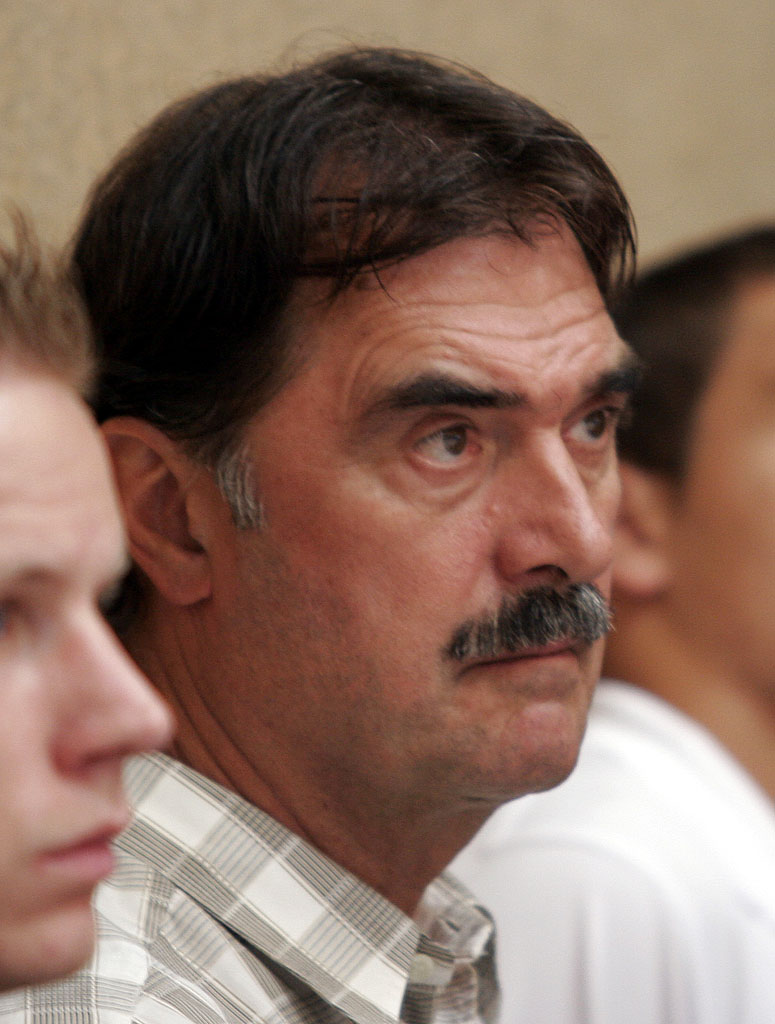
Hasanefendić in August 2007

After his military service in 1977, Hasanefendić began his coaching career at Željezničar Sarajevo with which he became Yugoslav champion in 1978. In 1979, he coached the junior Yugoslav team which became world junior vice-champion. The same year he took charge of RK Metaloplastika with which he won the Yugoslav Cup.

In 1980, the Swiss Handball Association asked him to lead the Swiss national team with the mission of bringing it back to the World Cup. He thus participated in the 1982 World Men's Handball Championship (12th place), then in the 1984 Olympics and finally the championship of the 1986 World Men's Handball Championship organized home. If Switzerland qualifies for the main phase, it finishes last in its pool and cannot do better than a modest eleventh place: Hasanefendić will not be extended at the head of the Swiss national team. Meanwhile, in 1982, he also successfully assisted TSV St. Otmar St. Gallen in the European Cup matches and successfully led the team to the final of the Champions Club Cup after eliminating Atlético Madrid then TV Grosswallstadt.

In 1987, he became cantonal coach of the city of Geneva. In parallel, he supported different clubs, such as the TuS Hofweier then the US Créteil. Thus, for two seasons, he coached on weekends while Thierry Anti managed training on weekdays and obtained the best results in the history of the club: vice-champion in 1988 then champion of France in 1989 and finalist of the Cup. Europe of cup winners in 1989. Similarly, at the Vénissieux HB between 1989 and 1992, he won the team's only 3 titles, the French D1 championship in 1992 and the French Cups in 1991 and 1992.

Like many French players, he joined the Handball-Bundesliga (German Championship) in 1993 where he became vice-champion in 1994 with SG Hameln, the club's best result.

In 1996, following the disappearance of OM Vitrolles with which he has just won his 4th French championship, he joined the US Ivry with which he reached the semi-final of the EHF Cup Winners' Cup and then won the LNH Division 1 (championship of France) with players like Stéphane Joulin, Vassili Koudinov, Raoul Prandi or Éric Amalou. Major financial efforts have been made by Ivry to obtain these results, in particular with the aim of achieving a good career in the Champions League. But the preliminary round against the Israelis of Hapoël Rishon LeZion turns to fiasco (defeats 27-22 in Tel Aviv and 21–22 in Ivry) and the club is eliminated before having really started the competition. A few weeks later, Hasanefendić left the club.

Subsequently, he was the coach of RK Celje, BM Granollers and finally VfL Gummersbach between 2002 and 2004. At the same time he was also the coach of the Bosnia national team.

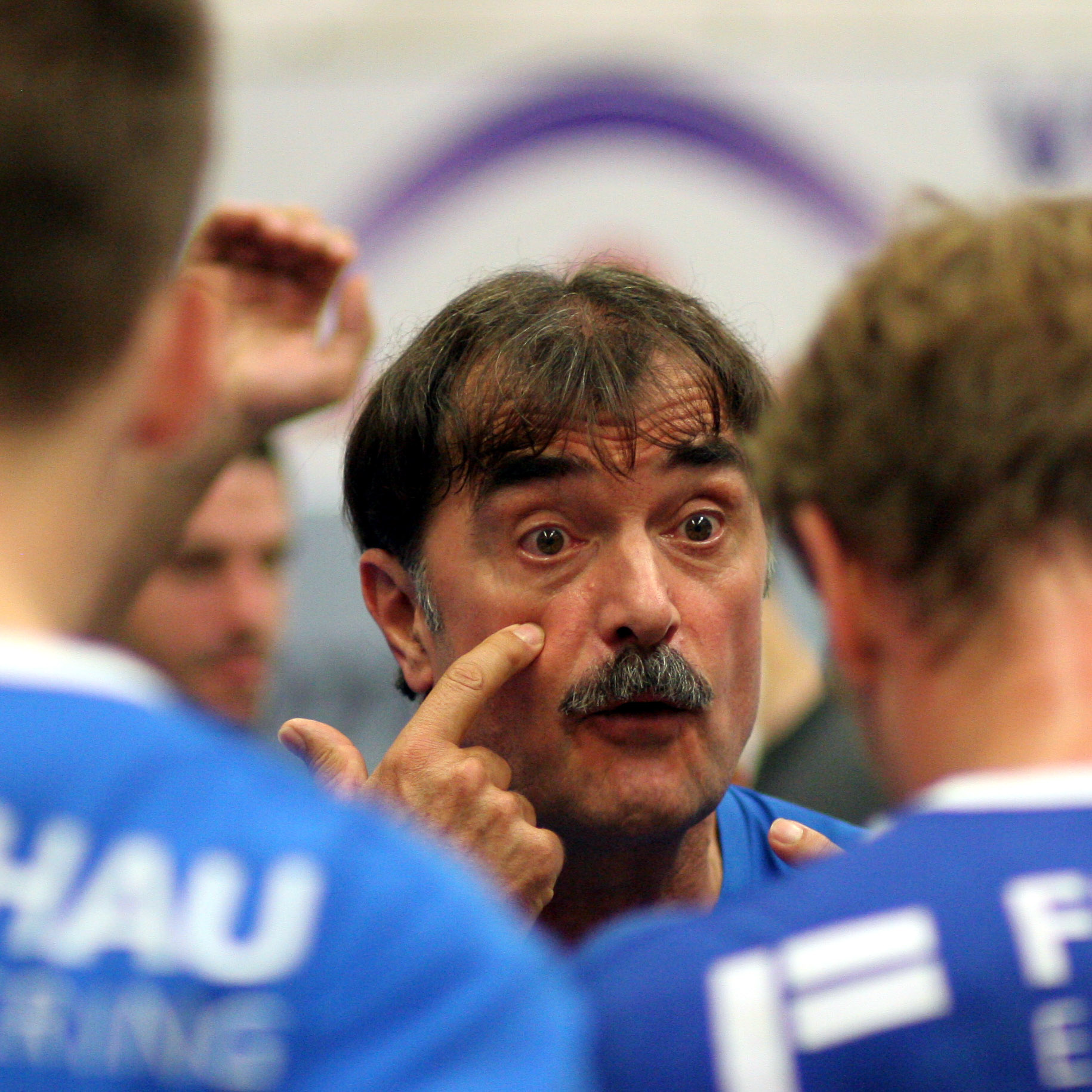
Hasanefendić while as coach of VfL Gummersbach

Then in 2004, he became for the first time coach of the Tunisia national team with the objective of the 2005 World Men's Handball Championship organized at home. The selection ended undefeated in the group stages and thus qualified for the semi-finals where they lose to Spain, the future world champion. Beaten by France in the bronze medal match, Tunisia finished in 4th place, the best result of a non-European nation at the time. He then remained at the head of the selection with which he won the 2006 African Men's Handball Championship. However, these two good results were not confirmed: Tunisia finished 11th in the 2007 World Men's Handball Championship, failed to qualify its team for the Beijing 2008 Olympics and lost in the 2008 African Men's Handball Championship final against Egypt after leading 4 goals at halftime. In July 2008, he announced that he was leaving Tunisia for the German club VfL Gummersbach, which he had already coached between 2002 and 2004. In three seasons, he won three European cups: the EHF Cup in 2009 and two Cups in 2010 and 2011.

On 7 July 2013 he returned to head the Tunisian national team for the next 3 seasons. However, at the 2014 African Men's Handball Championship, Tunisia lost its title to the host country, Algeria, without however calling into question its mandate as head of the Tunisian team.

In 2017, the Algerian Handball Federation announced that Hasanefendić will take the lead of the Algerian national team for the 2018 African Nations Championship, but an agreement is not finally reached between the two parties10. In 2018 he was appointed coach of the German club ThSV Eisenach, former club of the German Championship relegated to the 3rd division.

== Honours ==
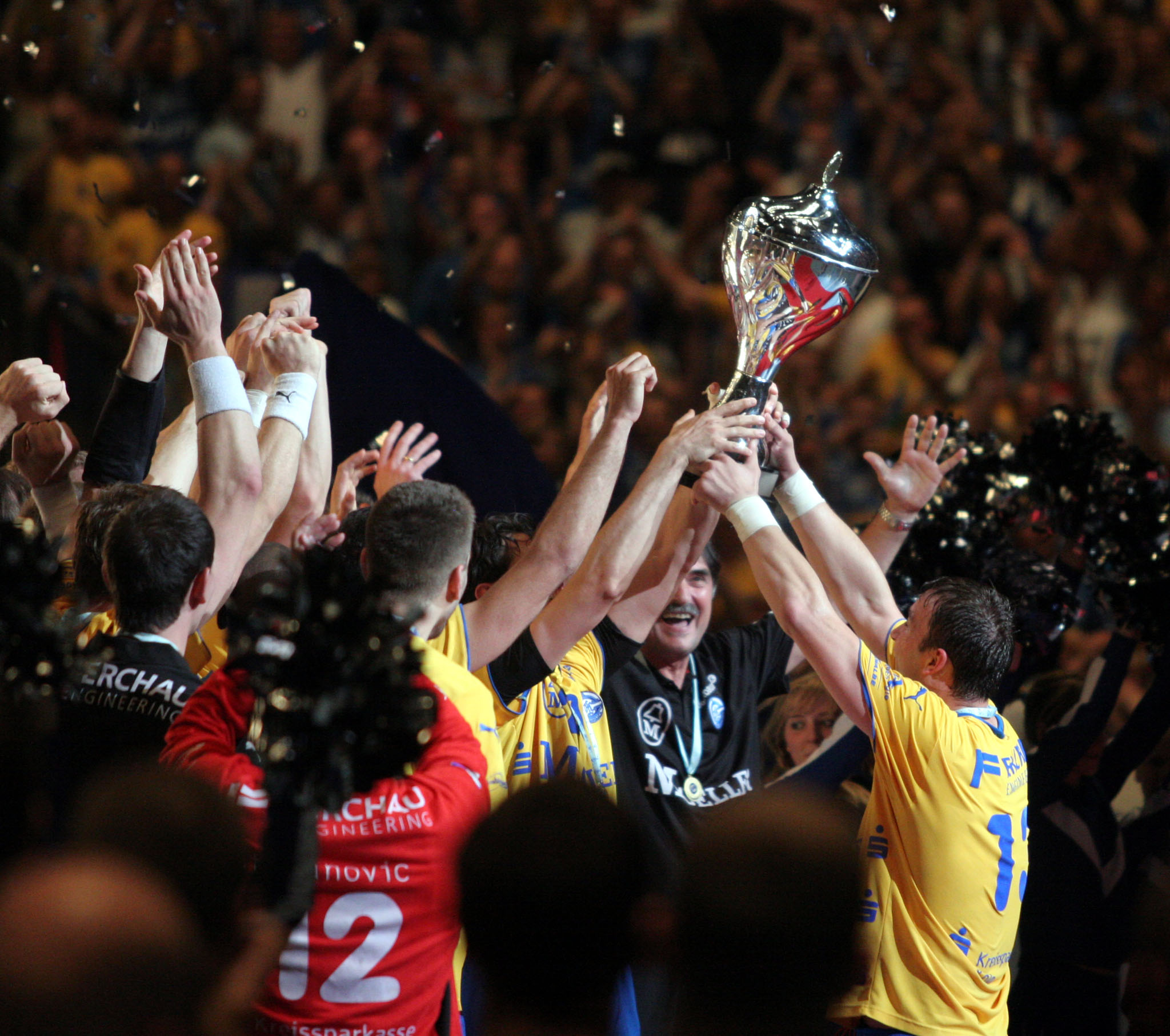
VfL Gummersbach, coached by Hasanefendić, lifting the EHF Cup in 2009.

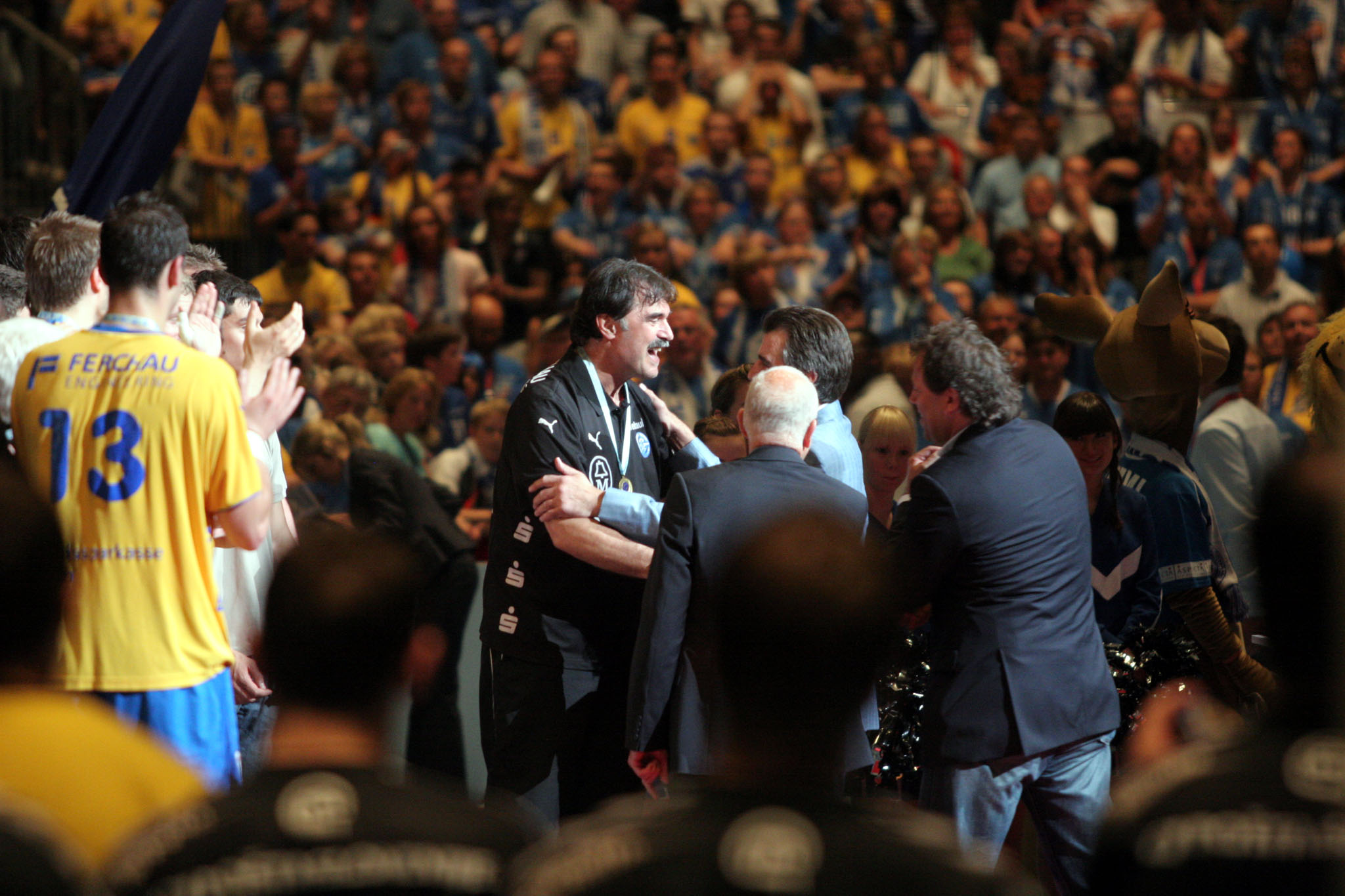
Hasanefendić congratulated by Heiner Brand for his victory at the EHF Cup in 2009.

=== National ===
- Yugoslav Handball Championship:
  - Winners: 1978
- French Handball League:
  - Winners: 1989, 1992, 1996, 1997
  - Runners-up: 1988, 1990, 1991
- French Cup:
  - Winners: 1989, 1991, 1992
- Handball-Bundesliga:
  - Runners-up: 1994
- Slovenian First League of Handball:
  - Winners: 1999, 2000
- Slovenian Cup:
  - Winners: 1999, 2000

=== International ===
- EHF Cup Winners' Cup:
  - Winners: 2010, 2011
  - Finalist: 1989
  - Semifinalist: 1997
- EHF Cup:
  - Winners: 2009
- EHF Champions League:
  - Finalist: 1982

=== National team ===
- World Men's Handball Championship:
  - Semifinalist: 2005
- African Men's Handball Championship:
  - Winners: 2006
  - Runners-up: 2008, 2014

=== Individual ===
- Coach of the year in Germany: 2010
