= Dobler (surname) =

Dobler is a surname. Notable people with the surname include:

- Alfons Dobler (1947–2008), Austrian football manager
- Bruce Dobler (1939–2010), American writer
- Conrad Dobler (1950-2023), American football player
- Henri Dobler (1863–1941), Swiss art collector, painter, and art critic
- Jonas Dobler (born 1991), German cross-country skier
- Kaitlyn Dobler (born 2002), American swimmer
- Konrad Dobler (born 1957), German long distance runner
- Patricia Dobler (1939–2004), American poet
- Rolf Dobler (born 1967), Swiss handball player
- Simon Dobler (born 2006), German trampoline gymnast
- Walter Dobler (1919–1995), American football player

== Fictional characters ==
- Lloyd Dobler, character in the film Say Anything...
