= Vasilakis =

Vasilakis is a surname. Notable people with the surname include:

- Alex Vasilakis (born 1974), Swiss handball player
- Alexandros Vasilakis (born 1979), Greek handball player
- Markos Vasilakis (born 1965), Greek Orthodox metropolitan bishop
- Niki Vasilakis, Australian violinist
