= Dobler =

Dobler may refer to:

- Dobler (surname)
- Dobler Brewing Company, a former brewery in Albany, New York
- USS Dobler (DE-48), an American naval ship
- Marcel Dobler (born 1980), Swiss politician and businessman
