= North Babylon, New York =

- Hamlet and census-designated place
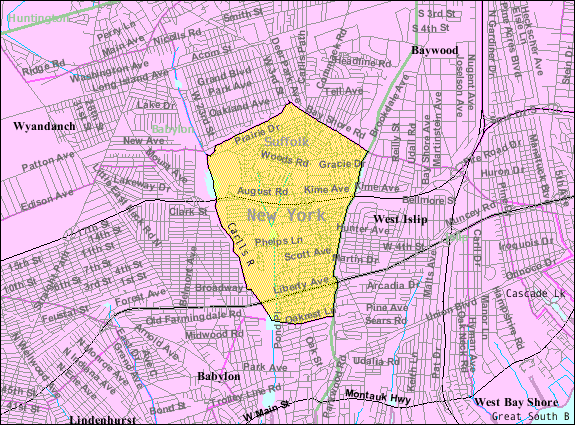
- U.S. Census map

- Location on Long Island Location within the state of New York
- Coordinates: 40°43′50″N 73°19′17″W
- Country: United States
- State: New York
- County: Suffolk
- Town: Babylon

Area
  - Total: 3.34 sq mi (8.65 km^{2})
  - Land: 3.30 sq mi (8.54 km^{2})
  - Water: 0.042 sq mi (0.11 km^{2})
- Elevation: 33 ft (10 m)

Population (2020)
  - Total: 17,927
  - Density: 5,437.6/sq mi (2,099.45/km^{2})
- Time zone: UTC−5 (Eastern (EST))
  - Summer (DST): UTC−4 (EDT)
- ZIP Code: 11703
- Area codes: 631, 934
- FIPS code: 36-51440
- GNIS feature ID: 0958667

North Babylon is a hamlet and census-designated place (CDP) located within the Town of Babylon in Suffolk County, on the South Shore of Long Island, in New York, United States. The population was 17,927 at the time of the 2020 census.

== Overview ==
North Babylon has a number of recreational areas – such as Belmont Lake State Park – where walking, cycling, picnicking, and boating are enjoyed. Phelps Lane Pool is also a popular recreational area for swimming, tennis, and relaxation.

The main commercial thoroughfare in North Babylon is Deer Park Avenue, which features a wide array of strip malls, shopping centers, restaurants, recreational activities, homes, and schools. A portion of this road is known as New York State Route 231 from Montauk Highway to Sylvan Road. The remainder of the road extends north to the Northern State Parkway in Dix Hills. NY 231 gained notoriety as a very popular "cruise strip" where hundreds of people would congregate in the shopping centers on the weekends to show off their classic cars.

== Geography ==
According to the United States Census Bureau, the census-designated place has a total area of 3.4 square miles (8.8 km^{2}), of which 3.4 square miles (8.8 km^{2}) is land, and 0.1 square miles (0.26 km^{2}), or 1.46%, is water.

== Demographics ==
Historical population
Census	Pop.	Note	%±
2020	17,927		—
U.S. Decennial Census

=== 2020 census ===
As of the 2020 census, North Babylon had a population of 17,927. The median age was 43.0 years. 19.2% of residents were under the age of 18 and 16.9% of residents were 65 years of age or older. For every 100 females there were 92.4 males, and for every 100 females age 18 and over there were 89.9 males age 18 and over.

100.0% of residents lived in urban areas, while 0.0% lived in rural areas.

There were 6,229 households in North Babylon, of which 30.1% had children under the age of 18 living in them. Of all households, 51.3% were married-couple households, 15.7% were households with a male householder and no spouse or partner present, and 26.3% were households with a female householder and no spouse or partner present. About 22.3% of all households were made up of individuals and 10.1% had someone living alone who was 65 years of age or older.

There were 6,430 housing units, of which 3.1% were vacant. The homeowner vacancy rate was 0.7% and the rental vacancy rate was 3.3%.

Racial composition as of the 2020 census
Race	Number	Percent
White	11,872	66.2%
Black or African American	1,833	10.2%
American Indian and Alaska Native	55	0.3%
Asian	1,022	5.7%
Native Hawaiian and Other Pacific Islander	5	0.0%
Some other race	1,362	7.6%
Two or more races	1,778	9.9%
Hispanic or Latino (of any race)	3,381	18.9%

=== Census 2000 ===
As of the census of 2000, there were 17,877 people, 6,146 households, and 4,707 families residing in the hamlet. The population density was 5,309.8 inhabitants per square mile (2,050.1/km^{2}). There were 6,271 housing units at an average density of 1,862.6 per square mile (719.2/km^{2}). The racial makeup of the hamlet was 84.9% White, 6.2% African American, 0.17% Native American, 2.09% Asian, 0.03% Pacific Islander, 1.95% from other races, and 1.63% from two or more races. Hispanic or Latino of any race were 7.34% of the population.

There were 6,146 households, out of which 33.4% had children under the age of 18 living with them, 62.3% were married couples living together, 10.5% had a female householder with no husband present, and 23.4% were non-families. Of all households 18.1% were made up of individuals, and 8.3% had someone living alone who was 65 years of age or older. The average household size was 2.90 and the average family size was 3.30.

In the hamlet the population was spread out, with 23.5% under the age of 18, 6.8% from 18 to 24, 33.2% from 25 to 44, 22.3% from 45 to 64, and 14.1% who were 65 years of age or older. The median age was 38 years. For every 100 females, there were 92.6 males. For every 100 females age 18 and over, there were 89.9 males.

The median income for a household in the hamlet was $88,027. The per capita income for the hamlet was $34,590. About 2.5% of families and 3.2% of the population were below the poverty line, including 2.0% of those under age 18 and 4.1% of those age 65 or over.

== Education ==
Students in the community attend the North Babylon Union Free School District, along with a number of private and parochial schools in the area.

== Notable people ==
=== Popular culture ===
North Babylon has had a number of residents over the years who have gained some varying degrees of fame.

- The Sopranos actress Edie Falco, lived at the end of Gracie Drive next to Parliament Place School for several years in the late 1960s and early 1970s.
- LL Cool J (born James Todd Smith) lived on Lakeway Avenue and attended Belmont Elementary School, and Robert Moses Junior High School in the 1970s and 1980s.
- Dee Snider, singer of the heavy metal band Twisted Sister lived on Lico Place in the early 1980s.
- Filmmaker Oliver Stone featured two people from North Babylon in his films The Doors and Midnight Express:
  - Patricia Kennealy-Morrison, born Patricia Kennely, grew up on Belinda Court and graduated from North Babylon High School in 1963. She exchanged marriage vows in a Celtic pagan handfasting ceremony with The Doors singer Jim Morrison in June 1970. She was an accomplished rock music journalist and author who also wrote twelve books. In Oliver Stone's film The Doors, Kennealy-Morrison appears in a brief cameo as the Wiccan Priestess. Kennealy-Morrison's character is portrayed by Kathleen Quinlan. Patricia died on July 23, 2021, at her home in New York City.
  - Actor and writer Billy Hayes wrote the autobiographical Midnight Express, which was made into an Academy and Golden Globe Award winning film also named Midnight Express by Oliver Stone.
- Erik Chopin was the winner of season 3 of NBC's series The Biggest Loser.
- Socialite, friend of Paris Hilton, and brief reality TV star Allison Melnick grew up in North Babylon, attending Peter J. Brennan Junior High School and North Babylon High School graduating in 1989.
- RuPaul's Drag Race Season Six contestant Darienne Lake, aka Gregory Meyer, who grew up in the Poet Section of North Babylon, attending Parliament Place Elementary School, until the early 1980s before moving to Rochester, NY.
- Model, actor and body builder Billy Herrington, grew up on Rhoda Avenue and was a 1987 graduate of North Babylon High School. He has gained international fame as "Aniki". Billy died in 2018.
- Steve Cuozzo is a New York Post writer/editor from North Babylon.
- Drew G. Montalvo, International DJ and producer, is from North Babylon.

=== Athletics ===
Danny Green, a basketball guard for the University of North Carolina who hails from North Babylon, achieved success that led him to the 2009 NCAA Division I men's basketball tournament. Green was signed to the San Antonio Spurs in March 2011. Danny Green won an NBA Championship in 2014 with the San Antonio Spurs, beating the Miami Heat, 4-1 and was traded, with Kawhi Leonard, to the Toronto Raptors, who went on to win the 2019 NBA championship. He then signed a contract with the Los Angeles Lakers for the 2019–20 season, winning yet another NBA championship that season.

Bria Hartley is currently a professional WNBA basketball player for the Connecticut Sun. She played point guard for the UConn women's basketball team, and won back to back national championships in 2013 and 2014. She was drafted by the Seattle Storm with the seventh overall pick in the 2014 WNBA Draft and immediately traded to the Washington Mystics, where she played until January 2017, before being traded to the New York Liberty to clear a salary cap.

Richard Scooter Berry, a 2005 graduate from North Babylon High School (NBHS), is a defensive end for the Arena Football League's Jacksonville Sharks. He has also gained notoriety for a picture from 2007 circulating on the internet where he is sitting next to fellow West Virginia player Johnny Dingle - forming a picture of "Dingle Berry".

Olympiads Joseph and Thomas Fitzgerald (1996 Olympics - Team Handball) also hail from North Babylon - growing up and graduating from North Babylon High School.

Tim Seaman, a 1990 graduate of North Babylon High School, was a member of the USA 2000 and 2004 Olympic teams for racewalking. He currently coaches other athletes from his currently home in Imperial Beach, California.

Chris Aloisi, born 1981, a soccer player and manager.

=== Historic Persons ===
August Belmont, the noted 19th-century financier, raised racing horses at his estate which is now Belmont Lake State Park. There is still a flat circular plot of ground just south of the Southern State Parkway on the western side of Belmont Avenue where his trainers worked the horses when they were in New York for the racing season. The former driveway of Belmont's estate was lined with tall pine trees that are still visible in the median of the Southern State Parkway just west of Belmont Avenue.

Austin Corbin, who developed Coney Island in the 1870s before he became the manager of the Long Island Railroad, built his summer residence along the shores of what is now known as Deer Lake.

Col. M. Robert Guggenheim, an industrialist and statesman, and brother-in-law to the founder of the Long Island newspaper Newsday, established a country estate on the same grounds as the former Corbin estate, which is now a neighborhood of post-war houses known as Parkdale Estates. The Guggenheims built a large home on Deer Park Avenue and horse stables (which later became the Stables Garden Center). For years the lakes known as Deer Lake were named Guggenheim Lakes. Other than the lakes and a couple of service buildings which were later relocated to West Islip, no traces of the Guggenheim estate remain.

=== Politicians ===
Former Suffolk County Executive Steve Bellone graduated from North Babylon High School in 1987 and was elected to office in 2012, serving until the end of 2023 after being term-limited out of office. Prior to serving as County Executive, Bellone served as Babylon Town Supervisor from 2001 to 2011.

=== 9/11 victims from North Babylon ===
- Richard M. Caproni, 34, Marsh & McLennan, North Babylon High School, Class of 1985
- Andre G. Fletcher, 37, FDNY Rescue Co. 5
- Kenneth A. George, 50, D.O.T (108 Forsythia Lane)
- Thomas Inman, 69, Port Authority of NY & NJ Police Department
  - Died April 12, 2020 from cancer as a result of the 9/11 recovery effort
  - Deer Park Avenue / Route 231 bridge over the Southern State Parkway named after him
- William Johnston, 31, FDNY Engine 6, North Babylon High School, Class of 1987
- Carlos Lillo, 37, FDNY Paramedic, EMS, Battalion 49
- Catherine L. LoGuidice, 30, Cantor Fitzgerald,
- Debra Mannetta (Ascoli), 31, Carr Futures, North Babylon High School, Class of 1988
- Thomas Mingione, 34, FDNY Ladder 132, North Babylon High School, Class of 1985, NYPD 1987-1992, FDNY 1992-2001
- Philip Ognibene, 39, Keefe, Bruyette & Woods, North Babylon Senior High School, Class of 1980
- Stephen Scalza, 42, NYPD, North Babylon High School, Class of 1990
  - Died October 1, 2014 from lung disease as a result of the 9/11 recovery effort
- Paul Sarle, 38, Cantor Fitzgerald, North Babylon High School, Class of 1981
- Mary Rubina Sperando, 40, North Babylon High School, Class of 1979

=== Vietnam War casualties from North Babylon ===
- SGT Peter Nelson Baldwin, US Army
- SP4 Vincent Anthony Datena, US Army
- WO Bernardino Francis Genchi, US Army
- PVT George Richard Green Jr, US Army
- SP4 Luis Rola Mercado-Collado, US Army
- PFC Wayne Lee Middleton, US Army
- SP5 Phillip Rogers, US Army
- SP4 Gary John Winkler, US Army
- CPL Henry York, US Marines
- LCPL Robert J. Reilly, Jr., US Marines, July 08, 1945 - December 09, 1965, North Babylon High School, Class of 1964
