= Poema =

Poema may refer to:

- Poema (musical group), American singer-songwriter duo
- POEMA, a poem collection of Mauricio Kilwein Guevara

== See also ==
- Poetry
