= Linus Persson (handballer) =

Swedish handball player (born 1993)

Personal information
- Nationality: Swedish
- Born: 16 April 1993 (age 33) Helsingborg, Sweden
- Height: 1.90 m (6 ft 3 in)

Sport
- Sport: Handball
- Position: Right back
- Current club: FC Porto
- Number: 37

Youth career
- Years: Team
- –2017: OV Helsingborg

Senior clubs
- Years: Team
- 2011–2018: HK Malmö
- 2018–2021: US Ivry
- 2021–2023: HBC Nantes
- 2023–2025: GOG Håndbold
- 2025–: FC Porto
National team
Years	Team	Apps	(Gls)
2014–	Sweden	46	(75)
Medal record
World Championship
Silver medal – second place	2021 Egypt
European Championship
Gold medal – first place	2022 Hungary/Slovakia
- Updated on 1 August 2025

Linus Persson (born 16 April 1993) is a Swedish handball player. He plays for FC Porto and the Sweden national team. He is a European champion from the 2022 European Championship.

== Career ==
Persson started playing handball for OV Helsingborg and joined HK Malmö in 2011. Here he helped the team getting promoted to the Handbollsligan. From 2018 he joined French team US Ivry for three years. Then he joined HBC Nantes, where he finished second in the 2021–22 season and won the French League Cup. In 2022 he won the Trophée des Champions, and in 2023 he won the Coupe de France.

In 2023 he joined Danish side GOG Håndbold. Here he won the Danish Cup in 2024. From the 2025–26 season he joined Portuguese team FC Porto.

== National team ==
Persson made his debut for the Sweden national team on 2 April 2014 in a 30–25 win over Germany.

He competed at the 2016 European Championship, although he did only play a single match at the tournament. At the 2021 World Championship he won silver medals, losing to Denmark in the final. He missed the 2021 Olympics due to injury.

At the 2022 European Championship he won gold medals. He was however not initially part of the squad, and only joined after several Swedish players had to leave due to being infected with Coronavirus.

== Private ==
He is married to Swedish handballer Isabelle Gulldén, and they have a son together from 2019.
