= Dobbelaere =

Dobbelaere is a Flemish surname. Notable people with the surname include:

- Ethan Dobbelaere (born 2002), American professional soccer player
- Julien Dobbelaere (1921–1961), Belgian wrestler
- Karel Dobbelaere (1933–2024), Belgian educator and sociologist

== See also ==
- Dobler (surname)
