= US Ivry Handball =

French handball club

US Ivry
- Full name: Union sportive d'Ivry handball
- Founded: 1947; 79 years ago
- Arena: Gymnase Auguste-Delaune
- Capacity: 1,500
- Head coach: Didier Dinart
- League: LNH Division 1
- Club colours
| Home | Away |

Union Sportive d'Ivry is a team handball club from Paris, France, and it is part of the multisports club US Ivry. Currently, US d'Ivry competes in the French First League of Handball.

Location of US Ivry Handball

== Crest, colours, supporters ==
=== Naming history ===
| Name | Period |
|---|---|
| Étoile sportive du travail d'Ivry | 1947–1949 |
| Union sportive d'Ivry Handball | 1949–present |

=== Kit manufacturers ===
| Period | Kit manufacturer |
|---|---|
| 2010 | (Germany) Adidas |
| 2010 - 2016 | (Germany) Erima |
| 2016 - 2018 | (France) Hungaria Sport |
| 2018–present | (Spain) Joma |

=== Kits ===
HOME
| 2009–10 | 2014–16 | 2020–21 | 2023–24 |

AWAY
| 2009–10 | 2018–19 | 2019–20 | 2020–21 | 2023–24 |

== Sports hall information ==
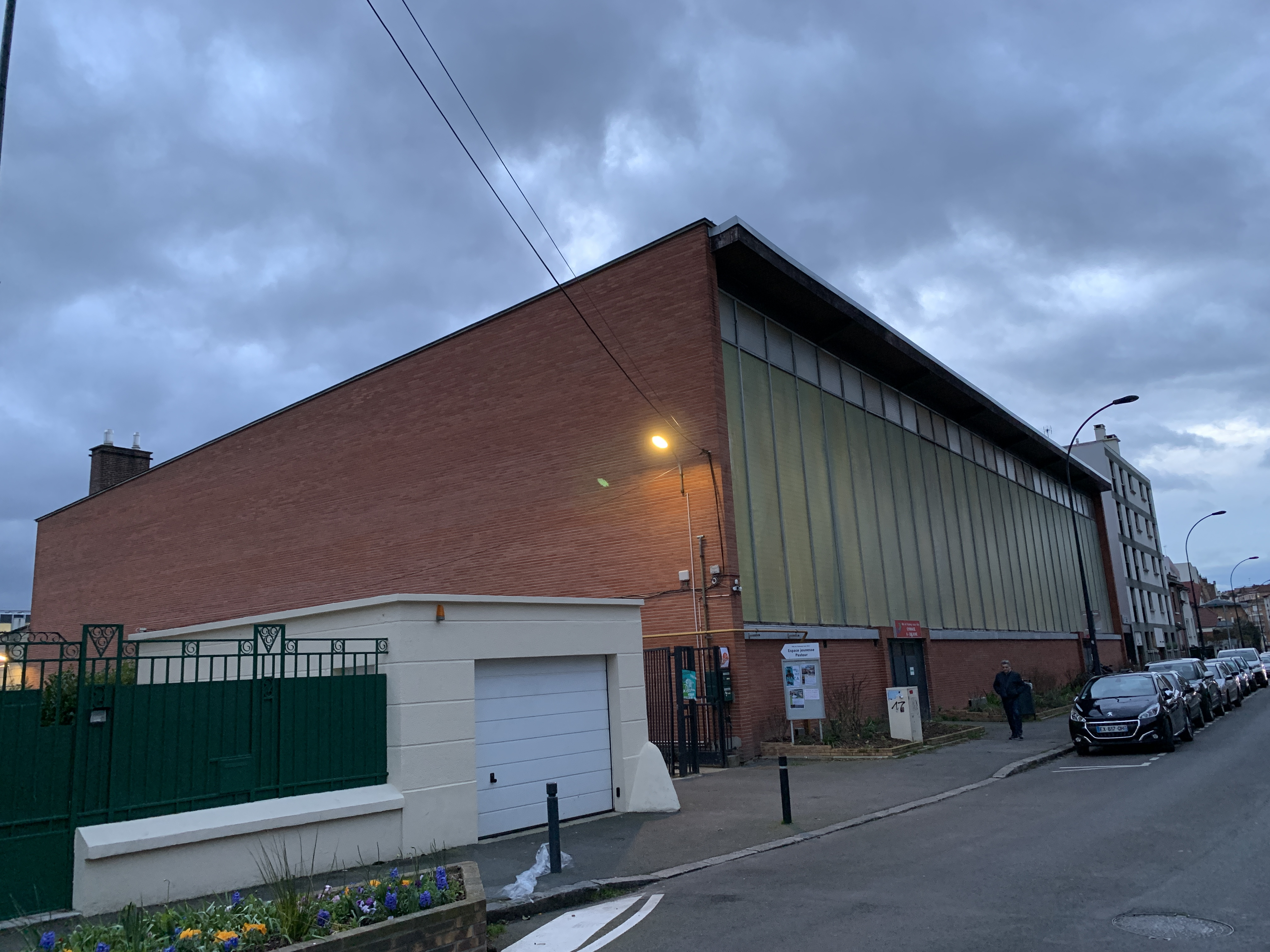
Home hall: Gymnase Auguste-Delaune

- Name: – Gymnase Auguste-Delaune
- City: – Paris
- Capacity: – 1500
- Address: – 16 rue Robespierre, 94200 Ivry-sur-Seine, Paris, France

== Accomplishments ==
- France Handball League: 8

Champion : 1962–63, 1963–64, 1965–66, 1969–70, 1970–71, 1982–83, 1996–97, 2006–07.
Runner Up : 1981–82, 1992–93.

- Coupe de France: 1

Winner : 1995–96
Runner Up : 1985–86, 1996–97, 2005–06, 2007–08, 2011–12

- Limburgse Handbal Dagen: 1

Winner : 1995–96
Runner Up : 1992–93

== Team ==
Squad for the 2022–23 season

Goalkeepers

- 12 (France) David Bernard
- 16 (Croatia) Mate Šunjić (c)

Wingers
LW

- 4 (France) Virgile Carrière
- 10 (France) Antonin Mohamed

RW

- 3 (Serbia) Vukašin Vorkapić
- 9 (France) Lucas Petit

Line players

- 21 (France) Robin Dourte
- 24 (Belgium) Simon Ooms

Back players
LB

- 2 (Montenegro) Miloš Božović
- 13 (Iceland) Darri Aronsson
- 99 (France) Axel Cochery

CB

- 7 (France) Léo Martinez
- 14 (France) Aymeric Zaepfel

RB

- 20 (Denmark) Jesper Jorgensen
- 25 (France) Louis Joseph
- 29 (Tunisia) Wael Chatti

=== Transfers ===
Transfers for the 2026–27 season

Joining

- (Czech Republic) Dušan Palát (CB) from (Czech Republic) HC Zubří
- (Croatia) Ivan Vekić (GK) from (France) JS Cherbourg
- (France) Rohnan Conte-Prat (LB) from (Italy) Handball Sassari
- (France) Valentin Bzdynga (RW) from (Belgium) Initia HC Hasselt
- (France) Jordan Yamdjeu (LP) from (France) Valence Drôme Handball

Leaving

- (Portugal) Manuel Gaspar (GK) to (France) Dijon Métropole Handball
- (Portugal) Francisco Tavares (RW) to (France) Saran Loiret Handball
- (Argentina) Martín Jung (CB) to (Spain) BM Logroño La Rioja
- (Spain) Robert Rosell (LP) to (Spain) BM Villa de Aranda
- (Denmark) Toke Schröder (LB) to (France) USAM Nîmes Gard
- (France) David Bernard (GK) to (France) Chambéry SMBH

=== Transfer history ===
Transfers for the 2025–26 season

Joining

- (Portugal) Manuel Gaspar (GK) from (France) C' Chartres MHB
- (Poland) (Sweden) Melwin Beckman (LB) from (Portugal) Maritimo Madeira Andebol
- (Denmark) Sebastian Wistoft Jensen (LB) from (Denmark) Aarhus HC

Leaving

- (Iceland) Grétar Guðjónsson (GK) to (Greece) AEK Athens
- (Spain) Arnau García (LB) to (France) Limoges Handball
- (Cuba) Ronaldo Almeida (RB) to (France) JS Cherbourg
- (Norway) Aksel Strupstad (LP) to (Denmark) Grindsted GIF Håndbold
- (France) Aymeric Zaepfel (LB) to (France) Pays d'Aix Université Club

== Former club members ==
=== Notable former players ===
- (France) Luc Abalo (1996–2008)
- (France) Éric Amalou (1996–1998, 2003-2006)
- (France) Benjamin Bataille (2015–2020)
- (France) Johan Boisedu (2019)
- (France) François-Xavier Chapon (2001–2018)
- (France) Fabrice Guilbert (1996–1999, 2005-2011)
- (France) Daniel Hager (1980–1997)
- (France) Stéphane Joulin (1988–1997)
- (France) Denis Lathoud (1997-1998)
- (France) Patrick Lepetit (1984–1987)
- (France) Olivier Marroux (2008–2011)
- (France) Olivier Maurelli (1997–1998)
- (France) Franck Maurice (1995–1997)
- (France) Raoul Prandi (1989-1997)
- (France) Jean-Luc Thiébaut (1991–1994)
- (France) Denis Tristant (1987-1988)
- (France) (Democratic Republic of the Congo) Audräy Tuzolana (2002–2008)
- (Algeria) Walid Badi (2003–2021)
- (Algeria) (France) Micke Brasseleur (2016–2018)
- (Algeria) Ahmed Hadjali (1997-2005, 2006-2009)
- (Algeria) (France) Mohamed Mokrani (1997-2008)
- (Argentina) Diego Simonet (2011-2013)
- (Argentina) Pablo Simonet (2013-2016)
- (Belgium) Simon Ooms (2019-2024)
- (Canada) Alexis Bertrand (2004–2005)
- (Croatia) Davor Dominiković (2011–2013)
- (Croatia) Irfan Smajlagić (1990-1993)
- (Croatia) Mirza Šarić (1996–1998, 2000-2003)
- (Croatia) Mate Šunjić (2018–2024)
- (Cuba) (Spain) Rolando Uríos Fonseca (1998-2000)
- (Czech Republic) Radek Horák (2012)
- (Czech Republic) Ondřej Šulc (2010–2014)
- (Iceland) Ragnar Þór Óskarsson (2005-2007)
- (Montenegro) Miloš Božović (2021-)
- (Norway) Alexander Buchmann (2004-2005, 2007-2008)
- (Portugal) Wilson Davyes (2019-2022)
- (Romania) (Spain) Javier Humet (2013–2014)
- (Romania) Eliodor Voica (1999-2002)
- (Russia) Vassili Koudinov (1993-1997)
- (Russia) Andrej Lavrov (1994-1996)
- (Slovenia) Rok Praznik (2001–2004)
- (Spain) Juan del Arco (2016–2017)
- (Spain) Rubén Río (2020–2022)
- (Serbia) Veljko Inđić (2008–2014)
- (Serbia) Dejan Lukić (1997-1999)
- (Serbia) Nemanja Marjanović (2010-2012)
- (Serbia) Dragan Počuča (2004-2009)
- (Serbia) Ivan Stanković (2014-2017)
- (Serbia) Vukašin Vorkapić (2021-2023)
- (Sweden) Linus Persson (2018-2021)
- (Tunisia) Wissem Bousnina (2010-2013)

=== Former coaches ===
| Seasons | Coach | Country | Source |
|---|---|---|---|
| 1947–1957 | Maurice Dubrez | (France) | |
| 1957–1962 | Robert Mérand | (France) | |
| 1962–1974 | Jean Benoits | (France) | |
| 1974–1988 | René Richard | (France) | |
| 1988-1990 | Árpád Kővári | (Hungary) | |
| 1990–1992 | Jean-Luc Druais | (France) | |
| 1992–1995 | Valeri Sidorenko | (Russia) | |
| 1995–1996 | Philippe Blin | (France) | |
| 1996–1997 | Sead Hasanefendić | (Croatia) | |
| 1997–2001 | Claudio Cimelli | (France) | |
| 2001–2006 | Daniel Hager | (France) | |
| 2006-2008 | Stéphane Imbratta | (France) | |
| 2008–2014 | Pascal Léandri | (France) | |
| 2014–2018 | Rastko Stefanovič | (Serbia) | |
| 2018–2023 | Sébastien Quintallet | (France) | |
| 2023– | Didier Dinart | (France) | |
