= Bishop of Chios =

Bishop of Chios can refer to one of the following two Christian prelates of the Greek island of Chios:

- the Greek Orthodox Metropolitan of Chios, continuing the pre-Schism see founded in Roman times
- the Roman Catholic Bishop of Chios, established in ca. 1400
