= Zumstein =

Zumstein may refer to:

- Zumstein catalog, postage stamp catalog from Switzerland
- Matthias Zumstein, (born 1973), Swiss handball player
- Zumsteins, locality in western Victoria, Australia
- Punta Zumstein, peak in the Pennine Alps on the border between Italy and Switzerland
