= Kamel Larbi =

Kamel Larbi may refer to:

- Kamel Larbi (footballer)
- Kamel Larbi (judoka)
