= Mariana Fleitas =

Uruguayan handball player (born 1981)

Personal information
- Nationality: Uruguayan
- Born: 6 March 1981 (age 45)
- Height: 167 cm (66 in)

Sport
- Sport: Handball
- Position: Right back
National team
- Years: Team
- –: Uruguay
Medal record
Pan American Games
Bronze medal – third place	2003 Santo Domingo	Team

Mariana Fleitas Rieira (born 6 March 1981), commonly known as Mariana Fleitas, is a team handball player from Uruguay who has played on the Uruguay women's national handball team.

She participated at the 2003 World Women's Handball Championship in Croatia, the 2005 World Women's Handball Championship in Russia and the 2011 World Women's Handball Championship in Brazil.
