= Cliff Mannon =

American handball player

Personal information
- Born: January 7, 1970 (age 56) Amarillo, Texas, United States

Sport
- Sport: Handball

Cliff Mannon (born January 7, 1970) is an American handball player. He competed in the men's tournament at the 1996 Summer Olympics.

Mannon attended the University of Oklahoma majoring in accounting, but was not on a sports scholarship while at the school. He was introduced to handball in 1990 by a friend who encouraged him to attend a tryout in Oklahoma City.
