= Joe Fitzgerald (handballer) =

American handball player (born 1971)

Personal information
- Full name: Joseph H. Fitzgerald
- Born: August 30, 1971 (age 55) Brooklyn, New York, U.S.
- Height: 6 ft (1.8 m)

Sport
- Sport: Handball
Medal record
Men's handball
Representing the United States
Pan American Games
Bronze medal – third place	2003 Santo Domingo	Team

Rev. Joseph H. Fitzgerald (born August 30, 1971) is an American former handball player. He competed in the men's tournament at the 1996 Summer Olympics alongside his brother Tom. While a member of the United States Handball team, Fitzgerald won the 2001 USA Team Handball Athlete of the Year and also helped the team to take home the bronze medal at the 2003 Pan American Games.

Born in Brooklyn, Fitzgerald moved with his family to North Babylon, New York when he was six years old. He first played handball at North Babylon High School. In 1993, he graduated from Ithaca College where he played on their baseball and football teams. Fitzgerald entered seminary in 2001 and was ordained as a Roman Catholic priest for the Diocese of Rockville Centre in 2007. He served as a chaplain at the 2024 Summer Olympics and has served as the pastor at St. William the Abbot Roman Catholic Church in Seaford, New York since 2019.
