= Robert Dunn (handballer) =

American handball player

Personal information
- Nationality: American
- Born: January 7, 1973 (age 53)

Sport
- Sport: Handball

Robert Dunn (born January 7, 1973) is an American handball player. He competed in the men's tournament at the 1996 Summer Olympics. At the time of the Olympics, Dunn had only been playing handball for 13 months.
