= Mauricio Kilwein Guevara =

Colombian-American writer

- Born: 1961 (age 64–65); Belencito, Colombia
- Citizenship: United States
- Education: University of Pittsburgh, Bowling Green State University, University of Wisconsin-Milwaukee
- Occupation: Writer
- Writing career
- Language: English, Spanish
- Years active: 1985–Present
- Genres: Poetry, Fiction, Drama, Translation
- Movements: Latinx, Latin American (Colombia, Ecuador), Magical realism, Surrealism

Mauricio Alberto Kilwein Guevara (born 1961) is a writer, translator, performer, activist, and educator born in Belencito, Colombia and raised in Pittsburgh, Pennsylvania. In 2002, he was the first person of Latino heritage elected as President of the Association of Writers and Writing Programs (AWP). He has won national and international awards for his writing, including the Contemporary Poetry Series Competition (Postmortem, 1992) and an International Latino Book Award (POEMA, 2010). Across genres, he is known for a seriocomic writing style that investigates the overlapping of voices, experiences, and tensions that complicate immigrant life in the United States and throughout the global Latin American diaspora. He is a professor of English and the Coordinator of the Creative Writing Program at the University of Wisconsin-Milwaukee.

== Early life and education ==
Kilwein Guevara was born in 1961 in Belencito, Colombia, a small Andean town 210 kilometers (130 miles) northwest of Bogotá, to John Kilwein (a social worker and, later, educator) and Beatriz Guevara Kilwein (a homemaker and, later, bilingual secretary). His father was born in Pittsburgh during the Great Depression. Born in Guayaquil, Ecuador, his mother emigrated from Bogotá, Colombia in 1963. At the age of two, Kilwein Guevara moved with his parents and brothers from Colombia to Pittsburgh, Pennsylvania, first living with his paternal grandparents in the Hazelwood neighborhood, then home to the Jones and Laughlin Coke Works. Of those early experiences, Kilwein Guevara has noted:

I was six or seven and listening to the immigrants and the natives and the migrants (some transplants from Germany, Italy, Colombia, Ireland, Poland, Hungary, Jim Crow Alabama, Mississippi, and Mexico by way of Weirton, West Virginia). To speak with an accent, to speak another language, to coexist giddily with tongues I didn't understand, to listen for tenor, to study how people laughed at the deli or pointed at the bread counter, to imitate how we learn to injure or sooth, to laugh or cry, this was quotidian.

By the age of seven, Kilwein Guevara and his family had resided in six different rental properties in Latin America, Baltimore, and Pittsburgh. Eventually by the mid-1970s his family was able to take up permanent residence in Bethel Park, Pennsylvania, where Kilwein Guevara graduated from high school in 1979.

From 1979 to 1983, Kilwein Guevara attended the University of Pittsburgh, where he double-majored in English Writing and Behavioral Psychology. While a student, he was hired by the Hillman Library to work the circulation desk of the Spoken Arts Collection. He has written that this job was formative: "In Hillman I also heard recordings of Neruda, Eliot, Plath, Sexton, Martin Luther King Jr., Delmore Schwartz, e.e.cummings, Allen Ginsberg, Robert Hayden and Frost." While an undergraduate, he studied with Patricia Dobler and Diane Ackerman.

He attended Bowling Green State University (Ohio) in the mid-1980s, earning a Master of Fine Arts in fiction writing. While at BGSU, he worked with Robert Early and Philip F. O'Connor.

In 1990, Kilwein Guevara completed a doctorate in fiction writing and literary studies in the Department of English and Comparative Literature at the University of Wisconsin-Milwaukee, where he studied with the novelist John Goulet. Of the latter, he has written: "Of the many things that John helped to clarify for me over the thirty years of our friendship is that literature at its best animates the core social functions of bringing humans closer to one another, of mitigating unwelcome solitude, and of growing our empathy for the world at large."

== Poetry ==
Kilwein Guevara's poems tend to focus on the intersections and overlaps of experience, language, time and space. His poems are both lyrical and experimental, Latin and North American, meticulous yet unpredictable. Colombian author Jaime Manrique calls Kilwein Guevara "righteous, funny, tender, melancholy, outrageous, musical, philosophical, terrifying, formal, colloquial, a realist, a surrealist, and a visionary—all at once."

Kilwein Guevara's aesthetic, as described by the literary critic Michael Dowdy, is "scavenger Infrapoetics" where poems "emerge from materialist and ecological conceptions of language" and employ "surrealist, magic realist, and vanguardist practices." Poet Patricia Monaghan writing for Booklist stated, "the word multicultural might have been coined for this poet, who alludes to Dante as casually as he deploys Spanish slang."

Kilwein Guevara's first collection of poetry, Postmortem, was published in 1994 by the University of Georgia Press and was nominated for the National Book Award. It was one of two winning selections for the Contemporary Poetry Series judged by Lynn Emanuel. The other was Susan Wheeler's Bag 'O' Diamonds. Publishers Weekly called Postmortem "a captivating view of immigration…Guevara's vivid use of color binds him to all those estranged from their homeland." His debut collection highlighted the complex and interrelated histories of violence that have united Colombia and the United States of America.

Kilwein Guevara's Poems of the River Spirit was published in 1996 by the Pitt Poetry Series.

Kilwein Guevara's Autobiography of So-an-so: Poems in Prose was published in 2001 by New Issues Press and was nominated for both the National Book Critics Circle Award and the Pulitzer Prize. Poet Michael Simms said the collection "leaps easily from image to image, using the rise and fall of prose syntax the way that a mountain goat uses thin ledges to scale impossible cliffs." John Bradley, writing in Rain Taxi, notes that "[Kilwein Guevara] takes autobiographical material and imaginatively recasts it into something of nearly mythical proportions."

Kilwein Guevara's POEMA was published by The University of Arizona Press as part of their Camino del Sol Latino Literature Series in 2009. Author Pablo Medina called POEMA "a necessary book for our time… the work of a mature and remarkably gifted poet."

Poet and critic Francisco Aragón, writing for The Latin American Review of Books, stated: "POEMA establishes the Colombian-born Guevara as the most 'Latin American' of Latino poets in the United States, if not simply one of our most cosmopolitan poets, period."

=== Poema ===
According to Kilwein Guevara, poema (Spanish for poem) is "a miniaturist form, especially the combustible lyric… the tinier the space, the greater the poem's expansive energy." For Kilwein Guevara:

Poema feels and is thought by the human body. Poema hunts and is haunted. Cut a line of poema open and it glows optic red. Poema spreads by capillary effect… It involves pain, like torn muscle between ribs. Poema celebrates joy and dolor and boredom. It is many tongued, polytropos.

About the collection POEMA Michael Dowdy writes: "Here is part of ‘Joan Brossa as the Emerald Moth Discharging Energy,' which takes as its departure point the Catalan avant-garde poet's 1967 art-object:

This is the strophe starring Joan Brossa
as the panicked emerald moth,
Joan Brossa en España, ensnared,
Joan Brossa being eaten by a wet strawberry,
Joan Brossa writing POEMA on a clear lightbulb,
Joan Brossa swimming the butterfly,
Joan Brossa a shape of color balancing
on a blush orchid in tierra caliente,
Joan Brossa at twilight staring up at Gederme,
Joan Brossa's statue with mountainous feet and legs,
genitalia and twisting torso transparent liquid glass
with buzzing filament.

The passage's sensual liquid movement is a long way from [Martín] Espada's Whitmanian anaphora and [Juan Felipe] Herrera's rollicking, shamanistic list poems. Like the infinitive in "The Easter Revolt," progressive tense verbs and adverbs ("starring," "writing," "swimming," "balancing," "staring," "twisting," "buzzing") propel the poem's energy outward, away from the object ("tablespoon," "lightbulb," "moth") to radiate in the night sky, the embodied strophe simultaneously gigantic ("mountainous") and tiny as a filament.

== Other writing ==
Across genres, he is known for a seriocomic writing style that investigates the overlapping of voices, experiences, and tensions that complicate immigrant life in the United States and throughout the global Latin American diaspora.

Kilwein Guevara has written a full-length play, a comedy entitled "El último puente/The Last Bridge," which received a staged reading Off-Broadway at Urban Stages, directed by Charlie Schroeder. In collaboration with colleagues Mike Sell, Barbara Blackledge, and Brian Jones, Kilwein Guevara staged a black-box performance of Autobiography of So-and-so at Indiana University of Pennsylvania. In 2010, he published a book of literary translations in Madrid, Spain with Travesías Ediciones. With research from a Fulbright grant to Ecuador, Kilwein Guevara traveled to do research for a novel entitled The Thieves of Guevara.

== Activism ==
Kilwein Guevara has been involved in labor organizing (as an elected officer with the American Federation of Teachers Local 3535), community organizing, language arts education in public schools, and in political resistance campaigns (the Wisconsin Uprising and the unsuccessful campaign to unseat Governor Scott Walker through a recall effort).

== Career as an educator ==
Kilwein Guevara has held numerous teaching positions across North and Latin America: Bowling Green State University (Ohio), Florida State University (Tallahassee), Marquette University (Milwaukee), Pontificia Universidad Javeriana (Bogotá), Universidad del Norte (Barranquilla), Indiana University of Pennsylvania, Vermont College (Montpelier), and since 2003 as Professor of English at the University of Wisconsin-Milwaukee, where he directs the Doctoral Program in Creative Writing

== Published works ==
=== Bibliography ===
- Postmortem. University of Georgia Press, 1994.
- Poems of the River Spirit. University of Pittsburgh Press, 1996.
- Touching the Fire: Fifteen Poets of Today's Latino Renaissance. Anchor Books, 1998.
- The Last Bridge / El Último Puente. 1999.
- American Poetry: The Next Generation. Carnegie Mellon Poetry Series, 2000.
- Autobiography of So-and-so: Poems in Prose. New Issues Press, 2001.
- POEMA. University of Arizona Press, 2009.
- Cansancio prematuro/Womb Weary. Translations. Spain: Travesías Ediciones, 2010.
- American Poets in the 21st Century: Poetics of Social Engagement (Claudia Rankine & Michael Dowdy, Editors). Wesleyan University Press, 2018.
- The Thieves of Guevara. A novel-in-progress.

=== Links to Selected Individual Works ===
- "A Rhyme for Halloween" at The Poetry Foundation
- "At Twilight on the Road to Sogamoso" at The Poetry Foundation
- "Doña Josefina Counsels Doña Concepción Before Entering Sears" at The Poetry Foundation
- "Bright Pittsburgh Morning" at The Poetry Foundation
- "My Grandmother's White Cat" at American Academy of American Poets
- "What the World is Trying to Be: Lessons from John Goulet" at The Association of Writers and Writing Programs
