= Mark Schmocker =

American handball player

Personal information
- Nationality: American
- Born: May 17, 1966 (age 60) Interlaken, Switzerland

Sport
- Sport: Handball

Mark Schmocker (born May 17, 1966) is an American handball player. He competed in the men's tournament at the 1996 Summer Olympics.

While born in Switzerland, Schmocker is a dual citizen due to his mother being native to the United States. Schmocker began to play for the United States handball team in 1994 and was a goalkeeper for the team during the 1995 World Men's Handball Championship.
