= Erik Chopin =

American television personality

Erik Chopin (born 1970) is the winner of The Biggest Loser (season 3) in 2006.

Before appearing on the show, Chopin attempted and often failed at losing weight and keeping it off. As the largest contestant on the show at that date, the odds were stacked against him from the beginning. He lost 214 pounds (97 kg), breaking all of the show's previous records, and held that record until Season 8 in 2009.

After his win, Chopin underwent plastic surgery to eliminate 12 pounds (5.4 kg) of excess skin. He traveled the country as a motivational speaker and lectured at many elementary and high schools, health clubs, corporate headquarters, youth weight loss camps and various health and wellness expos. He appeared on television shows such as The Oprah Winfrey Show, Larry King Live, The Today Show, Neil Cavuto, Entertainment Tonight, Issues with Jane Velez-Mitchell, Access Hollywood and local news channels. His many interviews also appeared in such publications as The New York Times and People Magazine as well as Us Weekly.com and numerous local newspapers.

In January 2010, Chopin and his family appeared in a one-hour documentary on Discovery Health Channel titled “Confessions of a Reality Show Loser”, and discussed his weight gain since The Biggest Loser and how it has affected both him and his family. In May 2010 Chopin appeared at the Biggest Loser Finale, showing his successful weight loss and current weight of 245 lbs. In late 2010, Chopin became a life coach and has kept the weight loss he was able to lose. He is still a motivational speaker at businesses and schools across the country and helps people as a certified life coach.

Chopin earned a degree in accounting from Hofstra University in 1998, and has a career in accounting with his family's business, Emma's Delicatessen in North Babylon. He is married and has three children.
