= Christian Meisterhans =

Swiss handball player

Personal information
- Nationality: Swiss
- Born: 16 June 1969 (age 55)

Sport
- Sport: Handball

Christian Meisterhans (born 16 June 1969) is a Swiss handball player. He competed in the men's tournament at the 1996 Summer Olympics.
