= Greg Caccia =

American handball player

Personal information
- Nationality: American
- Born: January 17, 1967 (age 59)

Sport
- Sport: Handball

Greg Caccia (born January 17, 1967) is an American handball player. He competed in the men's tournament at the 1996 Summer Olympics.

Caccia represented Pfeiffer Falcons in tennis. In graduate school, he began playing handball recreationally and was invited to try out for the Olympic team.
