= Roman Brunner =

Swiss handball player

Personal information
- Nationality: Swiss
- Born: 17 February 1971 (age 54)

Sport
- Sport: Handball

Roman Brunner (born 17 February 1971) is a Swiss handball player. He competed in the men's tournament at the 1996 Summer Olympics.
