= Jussara Castro =

Uruguayan handball player (born 1982)

Personal information
- Nationality: Uruguayan
- Born: 21 January 1982 (age 44)
- Height: 175 cm (69 in)

Sport
- Sport: Handball
- Position: Center back
National team
- Years: Team
- –: Uruguay
Medal record
Pan American Games
Bronze medal – third place	2003 Santo Domingo	Team

Jussara Castro Yañez (born 21 January 1982), commonly known as Jussara Castro, is a team handball player from Uruguay who plays on the Uruguay women's national handball team.

She participated at the 2003 World Women's Handball Championship in Croatia, the 2005 World Women's Handball Championship in Russia and the 2011 World Women's Handball Championship in Brazil.
