= Urs Schärer =

Swiss handball player

Personal information
- Nationality: Swiss
- Born: 9 November 1970 (age 54)

Sport
- Sport: Handball

Urs Schärer (born 9 November 1970) is a Swiss handball player. He competed in the men's tournament at the 1996 Summer Olympics.
