= Jardel Pizzinato =

Brazilian handball player (born 1978)

Jardel
Personal information
- Full name: Jardel Pizzinato
- Born: 10 February 1978 (age 48) Chapecó, Santa Catarina, Brazil
- Height: 1.92 m (6 ft 4 in)

Sport
- Sport: Handball
Medal record
Men's handball
Representing Brazil
Pan American Games
Gold medal – first place	2003 Santo Domingo	Team
Gold medal – first place	2007 Rio de Janeiro	Team

Jardel Pizzinato (born 10 February 1978), known as Jardel, is a Brazilian handball player who competed in the 2008 Summer Olympics.
