= Mohamed Bouziane =

Algerian handball player (born 1971)

Personal information
- Nationality: Algerian
- Born: 23 April 1971 (age 55)
- Height: 187 cm (74 in)

Sport
- Sport: Handball
- Position: Pivot

Senior clubs
- Years: Team
- 1990–1995: MC Oran
- 1995–1996: MM Batna
- 1996–1997: MC Alger
- 1997–2000: ES Tunis
- 2000–2002: AC Boulogne-Billancourt
- 2003–2004: HC Gien Loiret
National team
- Years: Team
- 1991–1999: Algeria

Teams managed
- 2016–: Martigue Handball

Mohamed Bouziane (born 23 April 1971) is an Algerian handball player and coach. He competed in the men's tournament at the 1996 Summer Olympics.

Since 2016 he has been the head coach of Martigue Handball in the lower french divisions.
