= Daniel Spengler =

Swiss handball player

Personal information
- Nationality: Swiss
- Born: 21 June 1966 (age 58)

Sport
- Sport: Handball

Daniel Spengler (born 21 June 1966) is a Swiss handball player. He competed in the men's tournament at the 1996 Summer Olympics.
