= Ferial Salhi =

Algerian fencer

Personal information
- Nationality: Algerian
- Born: 2 November 1967 (age 58) Annaba

Sport
- Sport: Fencing
- Club: MCA Alger

Ferial Salhi (born 2 November 1967) is an Algerian fencer. She competed in the women's individual foil event at the 1996 Summer Olympics, losing 7–15 in her only bout and coming in 37th.
