= Alex Vasilakis =

Swiss handball player

Personal information
- Nationality: Swiss
- Born: 18 September 1974 (age 50)

Sport
- Sport: Handball

Alex Vasilakis (born 18 September 1974) is a Swiss handball player. He competed in the men's tournament at the 1996 Summer Olympics.
