= Derek Brown (handballer) =

American handball player

Personal information
- Full name: Derek Dwane Brown
- Born: April 8, 1970 (age 56) Washington, D.C., United States

Sport
- Sport: Handball

Derek Dwane Brown (born April 8, 1970) is an American handball player. He competed in the men's tournament at the 1996 Summer Olympics.

Brown participated in track and basketball in high school. He was invited to participate in the US handball team while still a student at La Salle University. He later quit his job in insurance to join the team.

Following the Olympics, Brown played professionally in Sweden and Iceland. He later worked as a paralegal and in school administration.
