= Bruce Dobler =

American writer

- Born: June 30, 1939; Chicago, Illinois
- Died: August 15, 2010 (aged 71); El Paso, Texas
- Education: University of Illinois and Iowa Writers' Workshop
- Occupation: Writer
- Spouse(s): Patricia Dobler (divorced 1992); Julieta (Julie) Barrera (2008-2010)
- Writing career
- Notable works: The Last Rush North (Little, Brown, 1976); Ice Pick: A Novel about Life and Death in a Maximum Security Prison (Little, Brown, 1974); I Made It Myself (Grosset, 1973)
- Notable awards: First "writer-in-residence", Phillips Exeter Academy

Bruce Dobler (1939–2010) was an American writer.

== Life ==
Born June 30, 1939, in Chicago, Illinois, Bruce Dobler earned his BA at the University of Illinois and MFA at the Iowa Writers' Workshop. In 1969–1970, Dobler was the first "writer-in-residence" at Phillips Exeter Academy. Later he taught English Literature and Writing at Windham College, the University of Arizona, and the University of Texas, El Paso. He taught writing at the University of Pittsburgh from 1979 until his retirement in 2008. Dobler was married to the poet Patricia Dobler (1939–2004). He divorced her in 1992. On July 4, 2008, he married Julieta (Julie) Barrera.

== Death ==
Dobler was found dead in his home in El Paso, Texas on August 15, 2010. He was 71 years old at the time of his death, and was survived by his two daughters and second wife.

== Works ==
- The Last Rush North, novel (Little, Brown, 1976)
- Ice Pick: A Novel about Life and Death in a Maximum Security Prison, novel (Little, Brown, 1974)
- I Made It Myself, (Grosset, 1973)
