= Vénissieux Handball =

French handball club

- Short name: VHB
- Founded: 1965; 61 years ago
- Arena: Tola-Vologe rue Pierre-Brossolette
- League: Nationale 3
- Club colours

Vénissieux handball is a French handball club from Vénissieux, Lyon, France. The club currently plays in Nationale 2, the fourth tier of French handball.

They are most famous for winning the 1992 French Championship and the 1991 and 1992 French Cup.

The club was founded in 1965 under the name l'Amicale Laïque Centre Pasteur (ALCP). They have previously been known as Handball Vénissieux 85. After their sporting success in the early 1990s they were faced with economic difficulties, and after they could not pay a debt of 7 million Franc the club was relegated to the National 1 (third tier) on 14 June 1994.

== Famous former players ==
- (France) Éric Amalou
- (France) Philippe Julia
- (France) Guéric Kervadec
- (France) Denis Lathoud
- (France) Thierry Perreux
- (Croatia) Mirko Bašić
