= Nabil Rouabhi =

Algerian handball player (born 1966)

Personal information
- Nationality: Algerian
- Born: 15 May 1966 (age 58)

Sport
- Sport: Handball

Nabil Rouabhi (born 15 May 1966) is an Algerian handball player. He competed in the men's tournament at the 1996 Summer Olympics.
