= Tom Fitzgerald (handballer) =

American handball player

Personal information
- Full name: Thomas Vincent Fitzgerald
- Nationality: American
- Born: March 31, 1966 (age 60)
- Height: 6 ft 1 in (1.85 m)

Sport
- Sport: Handball
Medal record
Men's handball
Representing the United States
Pan American Games
Bronze medal – third place	1991 Havana	Team
Bronze medal – third place	2003 Santo Domingo	Team

Thomas Vincent Fitzgerald (born March 31, 1966) is an American handball player. He competed in the men's tournament at the 1996 Summer Olympics alongside his brother Joe.
