= Amar Daoud =

Algerian handball player (born 1967)

Personal information
- Nationality: Algerian
- Born: 22 August 1967 (age 57)

Sport
- Sport: Handball

Amar Daoud (born 22 August 1967) is an Algerian handball player. He competed in the men's tournament at the 1996 Summer Olympics.
