= Markos Vasilakis =

Orthodox Christian bishop

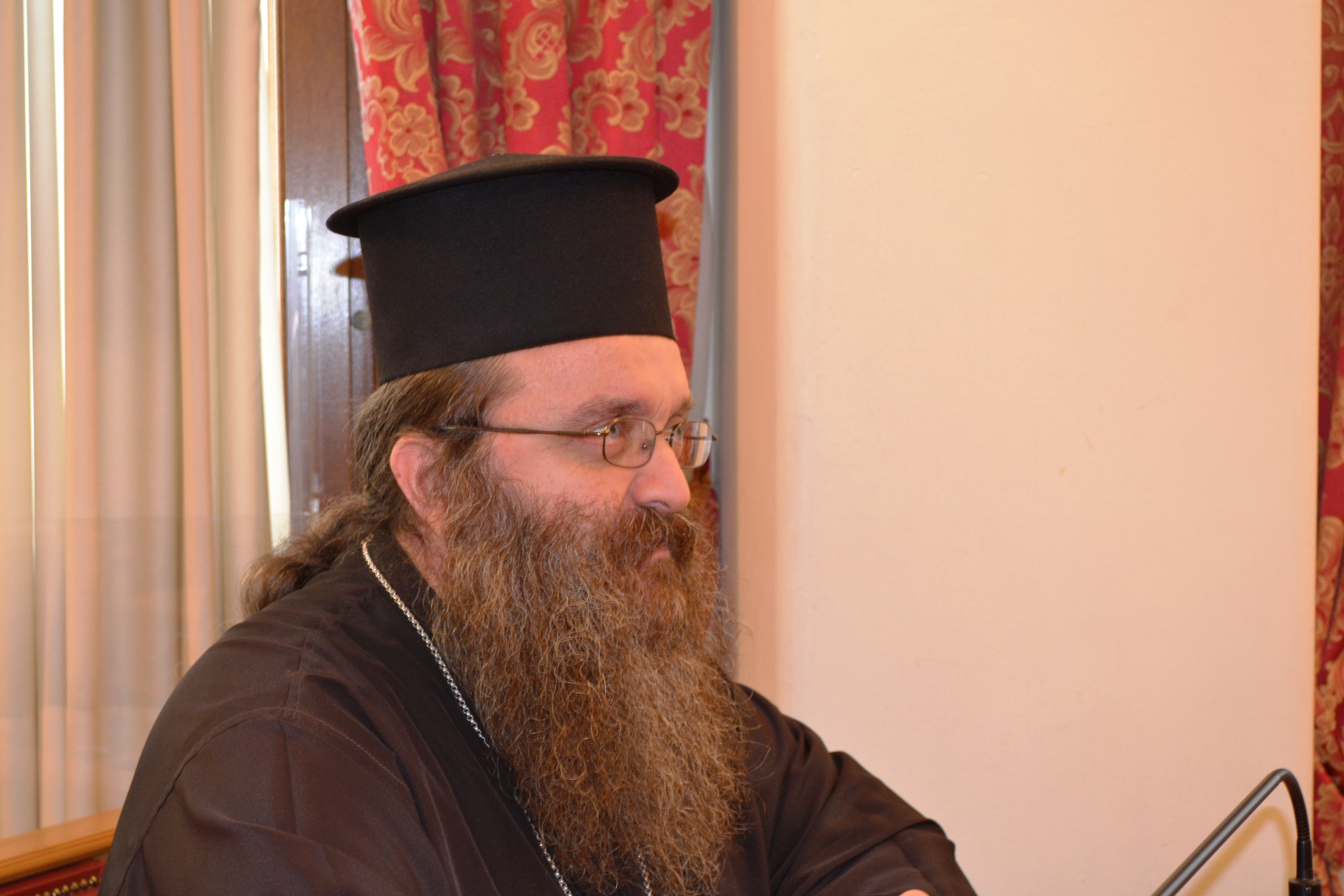
Markos Vasilakis

Markos Vasilakis (born 26 April 1965, Chios) is the Greek Orthodox metropolitan bishop of Chios, Psara, and Oinousses, Greece. He was an ordained deacon in 1994 and Presbyter in 2000. He is a B.A. graduate of the Department of Philology and the Department of Theology of National and Kapodistrian University of Athens, along with being a doctoral candidate in Byzantine Literature.
