= Éric Amalou =

French handball player (born 1968)

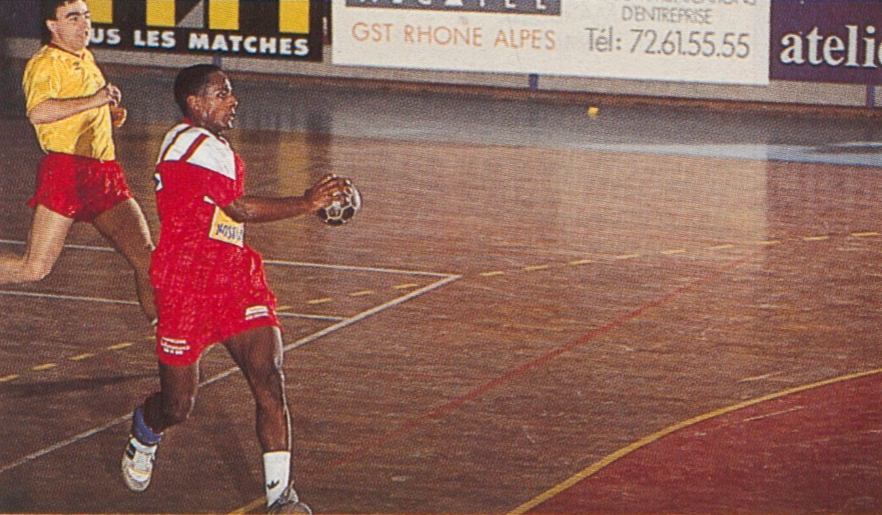
- Amalou (1993)

Personal information
- Nationality: France
- Born: 1 October 1968 (age 58) Le Lamentin, Martinique
- Height: 187 cm (74 in)

Sport
- Sport: Handball
- Position: left wing

Youth career
- Years: Team
- –: Vénissieux HB

Senior clubs
- Years: Team
- -1994: Vénissieux HB
- 1994-1996: OM Vitrolles
- 1996-1998: US Ivry HB
- 1998-2000: VfL Gummersbach
- 2000-2003: ThSV Eisenach
- 2003-2006: US Ivry HB
- 2006-2007: Emmelle Naca Teramo (Player-coach)
National team
Years	Team	Apps
1995-2001	France	90

Teams managed
- 2006-2007: Emmelle Naca Teramo (Player-coach)
- 2008-?: Thiais Handball Club
Medal record
Representing France
World Championship
Bronze medal – third place	1997 Japan

Éric Amalou (born 1 October 1968) is a French handball player who competed at the 1996 Summer Olympics and won bronze medals at the 1997 World Men's Handball Championship.

== Early life ==
Amalou was born on Martinique and moved to Vénissieux at the age of 3. Early in his life he also played soccer, before deciding to focus on handball aged 17.

== Career ==
Amalou started his career at Vénissieux HB, where he won the 1992 French Championship after finishing second in both 1990 and 1991. He also won the Coupe de France in 1991 and 1992.

In 1994 he joined OM Vitrolles, where he won the Coupe de France in 1995. He left the team in 1996 due to the team's financial trouble. He then joined US Ivry HB. Here he won the 1997 French championship.

In 1998 he joined German side VfL Gummersbach. After two years he joined ThSV Eisenach. In 2003 he returned to Ivry. At the end of his career he was the player-coach at the Italian second division team Emmelle Naca Teramo.

=== National team ===
Amalou debuted for the French national team on 22 November 1995 against Germany in the Super Cup. With France he finished 4th in the 1996 Olympics and won bronze medals at the 1997 World Men's Handball Championship.
