= Matthias Zumstein =

Swiss handball player

Personal information
- Nationality: Swiss
- Born: 5 March 1973 (age 52)

Sport
- Sport: Handball

Matthias Zumstein (born 5 March 1973) was a Swiss handball player. He competed in the men's tournament at the 1996 Summer Olympics.
