= Michael Thornberry =

American handball player

Personal information
- Born: August 16, 1972 (age 53)
- Nationality: United States

Michael Thornberry (born August 16, 1972) was a United States Army officer who competed in the 1996 Olympic Games in Team Handball, where the team finished in 9th place. He was born in Virginia Beach, Virginia. Thornberry was a 1994 graduate of West Point. He was a member of the US national team until 2005, appearing in the Pan American Games and Pan American Championships.
