= Rolf Dobler =

Swiss handball player

Personal information
- Nationality: Swiss
- Born: 6 January 1967 (age 58)

Sport
- Sport: Handball

Rolf Dobler (born 6 January 1967) is a Swiss handball player. He competed in the men's tournament at the 1996 Summer Olympics.
