= Alfons Dobler =

Austrian football manager

Personal information
- Date of birth: 9 October 1947
- Date of death: 1 October 2008 (aged 60)

Managerial career
- Years: Team
- 1979–1983: SCR Altach
- 1987–1991: SCR Altach
- 1993–1985: FC Rot-Weiß Rankweil
- 1997: FC Hard
- 1997–1999: FC Vaduz
- 1999–2001: SCR Altach
- 2002: FC Vaduz (youth)
- 2005: USV Eschen/Mauren

Alfons Dobler (9 October 1947 – 1 October 2008) was an Austrian football manager.
