= Mahmoud Soliman =

Egyptian handball player

Personal information
- Nationality: Egyptian
- Born: 27 August 1972 (age 52)

Sport
- Sport: Handball

Mahmoud Soliman (born 27 August 1972) is an Egyptian handball player. He competed in the men's tournament at the 1996 Summer Olympics.
