= Steve Penn =

American handball player

Personal information
- Nationality: American
- Born: November 19, 1968 (age 57) Hendersonville, North Carolina, United States

Sport
- Sport: Handball

Steve Penn (born November 19, 1968) is an American handball player. He competed in the men's tournament at the 1996 Summer Olympics.
