= Raouf Salim Bernaoui =

Algerian fencer

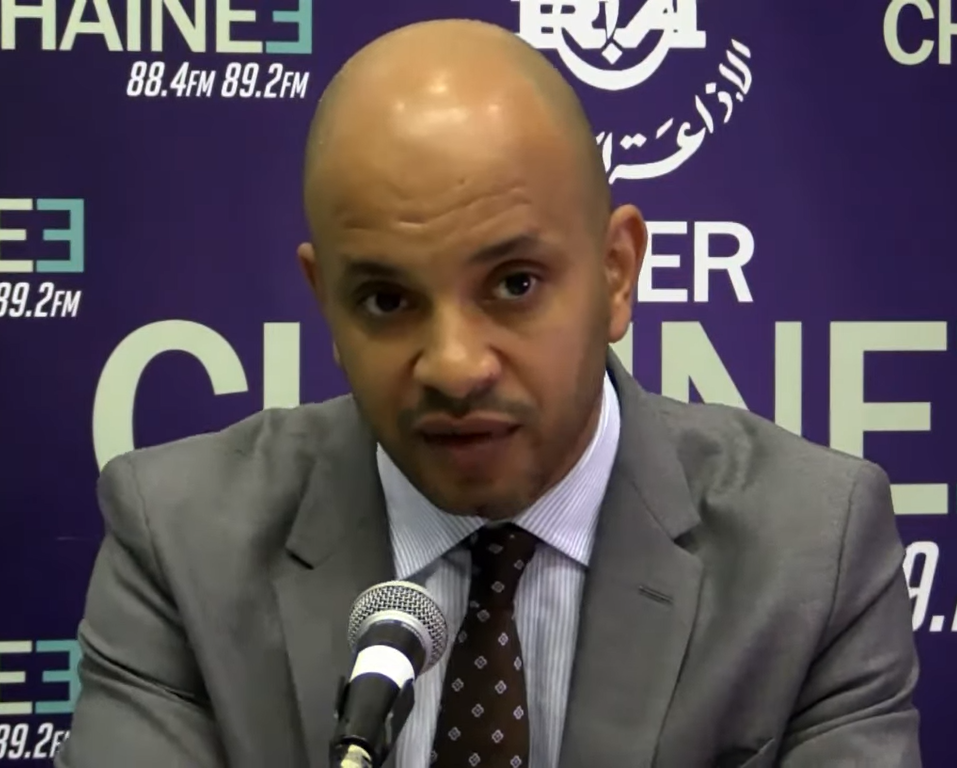

Personal information
- Nationality: Algerian
- Born: 11 November 1975 (age 50) Algiers, Algeria

Sport
- Country: Algeria
- Sport: Fencing

Raouf Salim Al Bernaoui (born 11 November 1975) is an Algerian sabre fencer. He competed at the 1996 and 2004 Summer Olympics, and lost all five of his bouts.
