= Metropolis of Chios, Psara and Oinousses =

Holy Metropolis of Chios, Psara and Oinousses

Orthodox

Location
- Country: Greece
- Headquarters: Chios (town)

Statistics
- Area: 904 km^{2} (349 sq mi)
- Parishes: 109
- Churches: 1069

Information
- Denomination: Eastern Orthodox
- Rite: Byzantine Rite
- Established: 325 AD
- Cathedral: Saints Menas, Victor and Vincent
- Language: Greek

Current leadership
- Parent church: Ecumenical Patriarchate of Constantinople and Church of Greece
- Governance: Episcopal
- Patriarch: Bartholomew I of Constantinople
- Metropolitan: Markos Vasilakis
- Vicar General: Archimandrite Nektarios Epitropakis

Website
- imchiou.gr/

The Holy Metropolis of Chios, Psara and Oinousses (Greek: Ιερά Μητρόπολις Ιερά Μητρόπολις Χίου, Ψαρών και Οινουσσών) is an Orthodox Christian diocese covering the Greek eastern Aegean islands of Chios, Psara, and Oinousses.

As part of the "New Lands," it belongs to the jurisdiction of the Ecumenical Patriarchate of Constantinople, but the Church of Greece carries out its administration.

Since 2011, the Metropolitan of Chios has been Markos Vasilakis.

== Charity ==
The Metropolis of Chios, Psara and Oinousses runs a welfare programme where volunteers organised by the church cook approximately 540 meals daily, 5 days a week. These meals are distributed to local parishes, where it is then given to those in need, 40% of whom are elders. In 2012, 2013, 2018 and 2020, separately, the Metropolis won food supply grants to feed approximately 300 elderly residents for 12 months.

In April 2020, as president of the Anti-Tuberculosis Association of Chios, Metropolitan Markos of Chios donated €6,000 to a Chios hospital along with an earlier donation of €20,000 towards SARS sampling and nursing infrastructure. This brings the total donated to the hospital to €26,000.

== Bibliography ==
- Kiminas, Demetrius (2009). The Ecumenical Patriarchate: A History of Its Metropolitanates with Annotated Hierarch Catalogs. Wildside Press LLC. ISBN 9781434458766.
