= Winglitton Rocha Barros =

Brazilian handball player (born 1974)

China
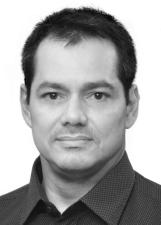
- China in 2016

Personal information
- Full name: Winglitton Rocha Barros
- Born: 22 June 1974 (age 52) São Paulo, Brazil
- Height: 191 cm (75 in)

Sport
- Sport: Handball
Medal record
Men's handball
Representing Brazil
Pan American Games
Silver medal – second place	1995 Mar del Plata	Team
Gold medal – first place	2003 Santo Domingo	Team

Winglitton Rocha Barros (born 22 June 1974), also known as China, is a Brazilian handball player. He competed in the men's tournament at the 1996 Summer Olympics.
