= Redouane Aouachria =

Algerian handball player (born 1969)

Personal information
- Nationality: Algerian
- Born: 10 November 1969 (age 55); Algiers, Algeria

Sport
- Sport: Handball

Redouane Aouachria (born 10 November 1969) is an Algerian handball player. He competed in the men's tournament at the 1996 Summer Olympics.
