= Guéric Kervadec =

French handball player (born 1972)

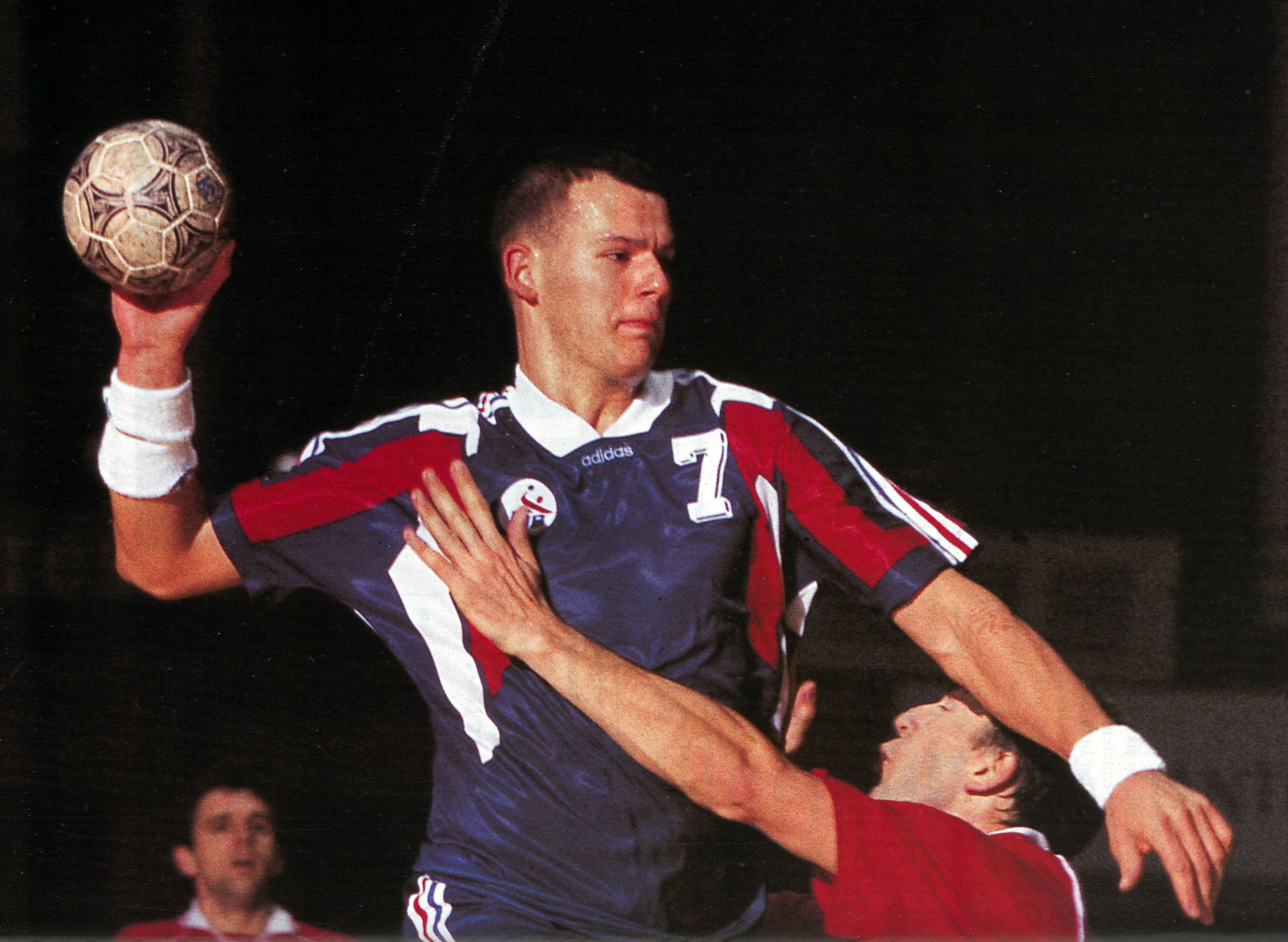

Personal information
- Nationality: French
- Born: 9 January 1972 (age 54) La Garenne-Colombes, France
- Height: 198 cm (78 in)

Sport
- Sport: Handball
- Position: Pivot
- Current club: Retired

Senior clubs
- Years: Team
- 1987–1988: Belley
- 1988–1993: Vénissieux HB
- 1993–1994: USAM Nîmes
- 1994–1997: US Créteil
- 1997–2002: SC Magdeburg
- 2002–2009: US Créteil
National team
Years	Team	Apps	(Gls)
1993–2005	France	217	(517)
Medal record
Olympic Games
Bronze medal – third place	1992 Barcelona	Team
World Championship
Gold medal – first place	1995 Iceland
Silver medal – second place	1997 Japan
Bronze medal – third place	2005 Tunisia

Guéric Kervadec (born 9 January 1972) is a former French team handball player who was part of the French team that won the 1995 World Championship; the first time France won a major international tournament.

== Career ==
Kervadec was born in the commune of La Garenne-Colombes in north-west Paris, and afterwards his family moved to Belley, where he playing handball. His first professional contract was with Vénissieux HB. Here he won the French Championship in 1991 and the French Cup in 1992. He then joined USAM Nîmes for a single season in 1993-94, where he also won the French Cup. He then signed for US Créteil Handball, where he played for three years. In his last year at the club he won the French Cup for a third time.

He then joined SC Magdeburg Germany. Here he won the German Championship in 2001 and the EHF Champions League in 2002. He also won the EHF Cup twice with the club.

In 2002 he moved back to France and rejoined US Créteil. In 2003 he won the French League Cup and reached the final of the French Cup with the club, and in 2004 he finished 2nd in the French league, behind Montpellier HB. He retired in December 2009 after a serious shoulder injury.

In 2003 he was included is SC Magdeburg's hall of fame.

== National team ==
He made his debut for the French national team in 1993 and competed in the 1993 Mediterranean Games. He then represented them at the 1994 European Championship where France finished 6th. In 1995 he won a gold medal at the 1995 World Men's Handball Championship. He competed in the 1996 Summer Olympics, where the French team placed 4th. He also participated in the 2000, where France finished 6th.

After the 2000 Olympics he retired from the national team, and did therefore not participate when France won their second world title in 2001. He came back to the national team in 2003, and afterwards participated in the 2004 Summer Olympics, where the French team placed 5th. His last tournament with France was the 2005 World Championship, where France won bronze medals.

== Titles ==
Vénissieux HB

- French Championship
  - Winner: 1991
- French Cup
  - Winner: 1992

USAM Nimes

- French Cup
  - Winner: 1994

US Creteil

- French Cup
  - Winner: 1997
  - Finalist: 2003
- French League Cup
  - Winner: 2003

SC Magdeburg

- German Championship
  - Winner: 2001
- EHF Champions League
  - Winner: 2002
- EHF Cup
  - Winner: 1999, 2001
