= Patricia Dobler =

American poet (1939–2004)

- Born: Patricia Averdick; June 18, 1939; Middletown, Ohio
- Died: July 24, 2004 (aged 65); Pittsburgh, Pennsylvania
- Resting place: Calvary Cemetery, Pittsburgh, Pennsylvania
- Occupation: Poet
- Spouse: Bruce Dobler (divorced 1992)
- Writing career
- Notable works: Collected Poems, poetry (Pittsburgh: Autumn House Press, 2005); UXB, poetry (Pittsburgh: Mill Hunk Books, 1991); Talking To Strangers, poetry (Madison: University of Wisconsin Press, 1986); Forget Your Life, poetry chapbook (Omaha: University of Nebraska Press, 1982)
- Notable awards: Brittingham Prize in Poetry

Patricia Dobler (June 18, 1939 – July 24, 2004) was an American poet and winner of the Brittingham Prize in Poetry.

== Life ==
Patricia Averdick was born in Middletown, Ohio, on June 18, 1939, and completed her BA in political science at St. Xavier College in Chicago. In 1961, she married the writer Bruce Dobler, and relocated with him to Iowa City; Exeter, New Hampshire; Putney, Vermont; Anchorage, Alaska; Tucson, Arizona; El Paso, Texas; and finally Pittsburgh, Pennsylvania, as he advanced through his academic and writing career.

After raising two daughters, Stephanie and Lisa, Patricia Dobler completed her MFA at the University of Pittsburgh, where she studied poetry with Ed Ochester, Lynn Emanuel, and Louis Simpson. In 1986, her book was chosen by poet Maxine Kumin to receive the Brittingham Prize in Poetry from the University of Wisconsin–Madison. That same year, Dobler joined the faculty of Carlow University, where she founded and directed its Women's Creative Writing Center, a position she held until her death in 2004. Dobler was also a popular leader of Carlow's non-degree writing workshop, Madwomen in the Attic. Her final book, Collected Poems, was published posthumously by the Autumn House Press in 2005.

== Death and interment ==
She died July 24, 2004, at her home in Pittsburgh. She is interred in the Roman Catholic Calvary Cemetery in the city's Greenfield and Hazelwood neighborhoods.

== Works ==
- Collected Poems, poetry (Pittsburgh: Autumn House Press, 2005)
- UXB, poetry (Pittsburgh: Mill Hunk Books, 1991)
- Talking To Strangers, poetry (Madison: University of Wisconsin Press, 1986)
- Forget Your Life, poetry chapbook (Omaha: University of Nebraska Press, 1982)
