= Salim Abes =

Algerian handball player (born 1970)

Personal information
- Nationality: Algerian
- Born: 17 October 1970 (age 56)

Sport
- Sport: Handball

Youth career
- Years: Team
- –: NB Tizi-Ouzou
- –: MC Alger

Senior clubs
- Years: Team
- -1995: MC Alger
- 1995-1996: HBC Villefranche
- 1996-1998: HBC Villeneuve d'Ascq
National team
- Years: Team
- –: Algeria

Salim Abes (born 17 October 1970) is an Algerian handball player. He competed in the 1996 Summer Olympics.
