= Marc Baumgartner =

Swiss handball player (born 1971)

Marc Baumgartner (born 1971) is a Swiss team handball player. He was top scorer at the 1993 World Men's Handball Championship, where the Swiss team placed fourth. He scored 41 goals at the tournament, the same as the two other top scorers Kyung-Shin Yoon and József Éles.

He competed at the 1996 Summer Olympics, where Switzerland placed 8th.

== See also ==
- List of men's handballers with 1000 or more international goals
