= Kamel Larbi (judoka) =

Algerian judoka (born 1976)

Personal information
- Nationality: Algerian
- Born: 5 March 1976 (age 49)

Sport
- Sport: Judo

Kamel Larbi (born 5 March 1976) is an Algerian judoka. He competed in the men's heavyweight event at the 1996 Summer Olympics.
