= Sofiane Khalfallah =

Algerian handball player (born 1968)

Personal information
- Nationality: Algerian
- Born: 14 December 1968 (age 56)

Sport
- Sport: Handball

Sofiane Khalfallah (born 14 December 1968) is an Algerian handball player. He competed in the men's tournament at the 1996 Summer Olympics. During the tournament, Algeria ranked 10th in the overall standings, with Khalfallah playing on the team.
