= Redouane Saïdi =

Algerian handball player (born 1971)

Personal information
- Nationality: Algerian
- Born: 13 May 1971 (age 53)

Sport
- Sport: Handball

Redouane Saïdi (born 13 May 1971) is an Algerian handball player. He competed in the men's tournament at the 1996 Summer Olympics.
