= Sofiane Lamali =

Algerian handball player (born 1974)

Personal information
- Nationality: Algeria
- Born: 31 January 1974 (age 52) Algiers, Algeria
- Height: 188 cm (74 in)

Sport
- Sport: Handball
- Position: Right back

Senior clubs
- Years: Team
- –: MC Alger
- 2000–2006: Angers Noyant
- 2006–2007: AS Monaco
- 2008–?: AS-BTP Nice
National team
Years	Team	Apps
?–?	Algeria	5
- Updated on only during the 1996 Summer Olympics

Sofiane Lamali (سفيان لامالي, born 31 January 1974) is an Algerian male handball player. He was a member of the Algeria men's national handball team. He was part of the team at the 1996 Summer Olympics, playing five matches.
