= Coupe de France (handball) =

French men's handball competition

Tournament information
- Location: France
- Established: 1956; 70 years ago
- Qualifier for: EHF European League
- Most championships: Montpellier Handball
- Website: FF Handball

Current champion
- Montpellier Handball (2026)

The Coupe de France masculine de handball is an annual national cup competition for French men's handball clubs. Organized by the French Handball Federation, it first took place in 1957 but has been discontinued on several occasions.

Montpellier Handball is the competition's most successful club as of 2026 with fifteen titles, followed by Paris Saint-Germain Handball with six.

== Champions ==
=== Winners by season ===
Year	Winner	Runner-up	Score
1956–1957	ASPOM Bordeaux	AC Boulogne-Billancourt	26–18
Not held from 1958 to 1975
1975–1976	SMUC Marseille	Villemomble-Sports	16–14
Not held in 1976–1977
1977–1978	Stella Saint-Maur	ES Saint-Martin-d’Hères (D2)	16–15
Not held from 1978 to 1984
1984–1985	USAM Nîmes Gard	USM Gagny	23–19
1985–1986	USAM Nîmes Gard	US Ivry Handball	24–19
1986–1987	USM Gagny	US Créteil Handball	27–20
Not held in 1987–1988
1988–1989	US Créteil Handball	USAM Nîmes Gard	13–11
1989–1990	Girondins de Bordeaux HBC	USM Gagny	23–21
1990–1991	HB Venissieux 85	US Dunkerque (D2)	26–16; 23–19
1991–1992	Vénissieux Handball	OM Vitrolles	24–20
1992–1993	OM Vitrolles	US Créteil Handball	32–22
1993–1994	USAM Nîmes Gard	Livry-Gargan Handball	27–13
1994–1995	OM Vitrolles	SC Sélestat	19–19; 26–21
1995–1996	US Ivry Handball	OM Vitrolles	30–22
1996–1997	US Créteil Handball	US Ivry Handball	19–18
1997–1998	Spacer's Toulouse	Montpellier Handball	27–20
1998–1999	Montpellier Handball	Spacer's Toulouse	26–21
1999–2000	Montpellier Handball	Dunkerque HBGL	21–16
2000–2001	Montpellier Handball	PSG-Asnières	30–26
2001–2002	Montpellier Handball	SO Chambéry	23–22
2002–2003	Montpellier Handball	US Créteil Handball	21–20
Not held in 2003–2004
2004–2005	Montpellier Handball	Chambéry Savoie HB	31–22
2005–2006	Montpellier Handball	US Ivry Handball	28–27
2006–2007	Paris Handball	Pays d'Aix UCH (D2)	28–21
2007–2008	Montpellier AHB	Paris Handball	28–26
2008–2009	Montpellier AHB	Chambéry Savoie HB	33–25
2009–2010	Montpellier AHB	Tremblay-en-France HB	33–25
2010–2011	Dunkerque HBGL	Chambéry Savoie HB	25–25 (3–2)
2011–2012	Montpellier AHB	US Ivry Handball	29–25
2012–2013	Montpellier AHB	Paris Saint-Germain	35–28
2013–2014	Paris Saint-Germain HB	Chambéry Savoie HB	31–27
2014–2015	Paris Saint-Germain HB	HBC Nantes	32–26
2015–2016	Montpellier Handball	Paris Saint-Germain	39–32
2016–2017	HBC Nantes	Montpellier Handball	37–32
2017–2018	Paris Saint-Germain	USAM Nîmes Gard	32–26
2018–2019	Chambéry Savoie HB	Dunkerque HBGL	31–21
2019–2020	cancelled in semi-finals due to COVID-19 pandemic		
2020–2021	Paris Saint-Germain	Montpellier Handball	30–26
2021–2022	Paris Saint-Germain	HBC Nantes	36–31
2022–2023	HBC Nantes	Montpellier Handball	39–33
2023–2024	HBC Nantes	Paris Saint-Germain	31–23
2024–2025	Montpellier Handball	Paris Saint-Germain	36–35
2025–2026	Montpellier Handball	HBC Nantes	27–24

=== Performances ===
#	Club	Winner		Runner-up	
#	Club	Nb	Years	Nb	Years
1	Montpellier Handball (T)	15	1999, 2000, 2001, 2002, 2003, 2005, 2006, 2008, 2009, 2010, 2012, 2013, 2016, 2025, 2026	3	1998, 2017, 2021, 2023
2	Paris Saint-Germain	6	2007, 2014, 2015, 2018, 2021, 2022	6	2001, 2008, 2013, 2016, 2024, 2025
3	HBC Nantes	3	2017, 2023, 2024	3	2015, 2022, 2026
4	USAM Nîmes Gard	3	1985, 1986, 1994	2	1989, 2018
5	US Créteil Handball	2	1989, 1997	3	1987, 1993, 2003
–	OM Vitrolles	2	1993, 1995	2	1992, 1996
7	Vénissieux Handball	2	1991, 1992	0	–
8	Chambéry Savoie Handball	1	2019	5	2002, 2005, 2009, 2011, 2014
9	US Ivry Handball	1	1996	4	1986, 1997, 2006, 2012
10	Dunkerque HGL	1	2011	3	1991, 2000, 2019
11	USM Gagny	1	1987	2	1985, 1990
12	Spacer's de Toulouse	1	1998	1	1999
13	ASPOM Bordeaux	1	1957	0	–
–	SMUC Marseille	1	1976	0	–
–	Stella Saint-Maur	1	1978	0	–
–	Girondins de Bordeaux HBC	1	1990	0	–
17	AC Boulogne-Billancourt	0	–	1	1957
–	Villemomble-Sports	0	–	1	1976
–	ES Saint-Martin-d’Hères	0	–	1	1978
–	Livry-Gargan Handball	0	–	1	1994
–	SC Sélestat	0	–	1	1995
–	Pays d'Aix UCH	0	–	1	2007
–	Tremblay-en-France Handball	0	–	1	2010
Total		42	1957–2026	42	1957–2026

Legend : 10 cups won; (T) : title holder

== See also ==
- LNH
- Division 1
- Coupe de la Ligue
- Trophée des champions
- Coupe France (women)
