= Raoul Prandi =

French handball player (born 1969)

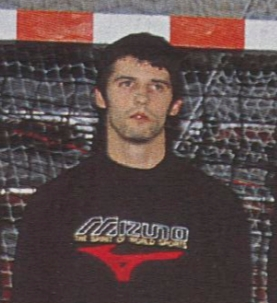

Personal information
- Nationality: France
- Born: 16 August 1969 (age 57) Paris, France
- Height: 189 cm (74 in)

Sport
- Sport: Handball
- Position: Centre back

Youth career
- Years: Team
- 1984-1985: AS Police Paris
- 1985-1989: AS Saint-Mandé

Senior clubs
- Years: Team
- 1989-1997: US Ivry
- 1998: LTV Wuppertal
- 1998-2000: Istres Sports
- 2000-2001: LTV Wuppertal
- 2001-2002: Livry-Gargan
- 2002-2003: AS Saint-Mandé
- 2003-2009: Mainvilliers-Chartres
National team
Years	Team	Apps
1996-1997	France	39

Raoul Prandi (born 16 August 1969) is a French former handball player. He was a member of the France men's national handball team. He was part of the team at the 1996 Summer Olympics, playing six matches. On club level he played for US Ivry in Ivry-sur-Seine.

His son, Elohim Prandi, is also a professional handballer.
