= Handball at the 1996 Summer Olympics – Men's tournament =

1996 Men's Olympic handball tournament
Tournament details
- Host country: United States
- Venue(s): Georgia Dome Final; Georgia World Congress Center
- Dates: 24 July – 4 August 1996
- Teams: 12

Final positions
- Champions: Croatia (1st title)
- Runners-up: Sweden
- Third place: Spain
- Fourth place: France

Tournament statistics
- Matches played: 38
- Goals scored: 1,822 (47.95 per match)
- Attendance: 305,100 (8,029 per match)
- Top scorers: (Croatia) Patrik Ćavar (43 goals)

The men's handball tournament at the 1996 Summer Olympics was contested by twelve teams divided in two groups, with the top two proceeding to the semifinals and the bottom four proceeding to placement matches.

== Qualification ==
| Mean of qualification | Date | Host | Vacancies | Qualified |
|---|---|---|---|---|
| Host nation | 18 September 1990 | (Japan) Tokyo | 1 | United States |
| 1995 Pan American Games | 16–25 March 1995 | (Argentina) Mar del Plata | 1 | Brazil |
| 1995 World Championship | 7–21 May 1995 | Iceland | 7 | France; Croatia; Sweden; Germany; Russia; Egypt; Switzerland |
| 1995 Asian Championship | 25 September – 6 October 1995 | Kuwait City | 1 | Kuwait |
| 1996 European Championship | 24 May – 2 June 1996 | Spain | 1 | Spain |
| African qualification tournament | 6-12 October 1995 | (Egypt) Cairo | 1 | Algeria |
| Total | | | 12 | |

== Preliminary round ==
=== Group A ===
| Pos | Team | Pld | W | D | L | GF | GA | GD | Pts | Qualification |
|---|---|---|---|---|---|---|---|---|---|---|
| 1 | Sweden | 5 | 5 | 0 | 0 | 131 | 94 | +37 | 10 | Semifinals |
| 2 | Croatia | 5 | 4 | 0 | 1 | 132 | 122 | +10 | 8 | Semifinals |
| 3 | Russia | 5 | 3 | 0 | 2 | 137 | 106 | +31 | 6 | Fifth place game |
| 4 | Switzerland | 5 | 2 | 0 | 3 | 126 | 115 | +11 | 4 | Seventh place game |
| 5 | United States (H) | 5 | 1 | 0 | 4 | 111 | 142 | −31 | 2 | Ninth place game |
| 6 | Kuwait | 5 | 0 | 0 | 5 | 100 | 158 | −58 | 0 | Eleventh place game |

Rules for classification: 1) points; 2) head-to-head points; 3) head-to-head goal difference; 4) head-to-head number of goals scored; 5) goal difference.
(H) Hosts

| 24 July 1996; 10:00 | Russia | 32–20 | Kuwait | Georgia World Congress Center; Referees: Thomas, Thomas (GER) |
| 24 July 1996; 10:00 | Kuleshov 7 | (18–10) | S. Al-Marzouq 6 | Georgia World Congress Center; Referees: Thomas, Thomas (GER) |

| 24 July 1996; 14:30 | Croatia | 23–22 | Switzerland | Georgia World Congress Center; Referees: Dăncescu, Mateescu (ROU) |
| 24 July 1996; 14:30 | Ćavar 8 | (12–14) | Baumgartner 5 | Georgia World Congress Center; Referees: Dăncescu, Mateescu (ROU) |

| 24 July 1996; 19:00 | Sweden | 23–19 | United States | Georgia World Congress Center; Referees: Gedvilas, Guterman (LTU) |
| 24 July 1996; 19:00 | Wislander 5 | (11–9) | Heath 4 | Georgia World Congress Center; Referees: Gedvilas, Guterman (LTU) |

| 25 July 1996; 10:00 | Kuwait | 22–31 | Croatia | Georgia World Congress Center; Referees: Gallego, Lamas (ESP) |
| 25 July 1996; 10:00 | S. Al-Marzouq 6 | (11–16) | Ćavar 10 | Georgia World Congress Center; Referees: Gallego, Lamas (ESP) |

| 25 July 1996; 14:30 | Switzerland | 19–26 | Sweden | Georgia World Congress Center; Referees: Garcia, Moréno (FRA) |
| 25 July 1996; 14:30 | Baumgartner 5 | (8–14) | Hajas 6 | Georgia World Congress Center; Referees: Garcia, Moréno (FRA) |

| 25 July 1996; 20:45 | Russia | 31–16 | United States | Georgia World Congress Center; Referees: Moelle Mabounda, Mvoula (CGO) |
| 25 July 1996; 20:45 | Kudinov 10 | (16–9) | Penn 4 | Georgia World Congress Center; Referees: Moelle Mabounda, Mvoula (CGO) |

| 27 July 1996; 11:45 | Switzerland | 33–16 | Kuwait | Georgia World Congress Center; Referees: Gedvilas, Guterman (LTU) |
| 27 July 1996; 11:45 | Barth, Spengler 6 | (18–8) | Al-Ali 4 | Georgia World Congress Center; Referees: Gedvilas, Guterman (LTU) |

| 27 July 1996; 14:30 | Sweden | 22–20 | Russia | Georgia World Congress Center; Referees: Gallego, Lamas (ESP) |
| 27 July 1996; 14:30 | M. Andersson 5 | (11–11) | Gopin, Torgovanov 5 | Georgia World Congress Center; Referees: Gallego, Lamas (ESP) |

| 27 July 1996; 19:00 | Croatia | 35–27 | United States | Georgia World Congress Center; Referees: Garcia, Moréno (FRA) |
| 27 July 1996; 19:00 | Smajlagić 11 | (20–9) | Brown 8 | Georgia World Congress Center; Referees: Garcia, Moréno (FRA) |

| 29 July 1996; 11:45 | Sweden | 33–18 | Kuwait | Georgia World Congress Center; Referees: Brussel, van Dongen (NED) |
| 29 July 1996; 11:45 | Petersson 10 | (16–7) | Al-Ali 4 | Georgia World Congress Center; Referees: Brussel, van Dongen (NED) |

| 29 July 1996; 16:15 | Russia | 24–25 | Croatia | Georgia World Congress Center; Referees: Elbrønd, Løvqvist (DEN) |
| 29 July 1996; 16:15 | Gopin 7 | (13–11) | Jović 7 | Georgia World Congress Center; Referees: Elbrønd, Løvqvist (DEN) |

| 29 July 1996; 20:45 | United States | 20–29 | Switzerland | Georgia World Congress Center; Referees: Thomas, Thomas (GER) |
| 29 July 1996; 20:45 | Heath 7 | (9–12) | Baumgartner 13 | Georgia World Congress Center; Referees: Thomas, Thomas (GER) |

| 31 July 1996; 11:45 | Russia | 30–23 | Switzerland | Georgia World Congress Center; Referees: Garcia, Moréno (FRA) |
| 31 July 1996; 11:45 | Kuleshov 9 | (14–11) | Spengler 8 | Georgia World Congress Center; Referees: Garcia, Moréno (FRA) |

| 31 July 1996; 14:30 | Croatia | 18–27 | Sweden | Georgia World Congress Center; Referees: Thomas, Thomas (GER) |
| 31 July 1996; 14:30 | Mikulić 6 | (7–10) | Hajas, Thorsson 7 | Georgia World Congress Center; Referees: Thomas, Thomas (GER) |

| 31 July 1996; 20:45 | Kuwait | 24–29 | United States | Georgia World Congress Center; Referees: Dăncescu, Mateescu (ROU) |
| 31 July 1996; 20:45 | S. Al-Marzouq 9 | (10–13) | DeGraaf 13 | Georgia World Congress Center; Referees: Dăncescu, Mateescu (ROU) |

=== Group B ===
| Pos | Team | Pld | W | D | L | GF | GA | GD | Pts | Qualification |
|---|---|---|---|---|---|---|---|---|---|---|
| 1 | France | 5 | 4 | 0 | 1 | 145 | 114 | +31 | 8 (Note: France 27–25 Spain) | Semifinals |
| 2 | Spain | 5 | 4 | 0 | 1 | 114 | 97 | +17 | 8 | Semifinals |
| 3 | Egypt | 5 | 3 | 0 | 2 | 113 | 103 | +10 | 6 (Note: Germany 22–24 Egypt) | Fifth place game |
| 4 | Germany | 5 | 3 | 0 | 2 | 121 | 112 | +9 | 6 | Seventh place game |
| 5 | Algeria | 5 | 0 | 1 | 4 | 95 | 117 | −22 | 1 (Note: Algeria 20–20 Brazil) | Ninth place game |
| 6 | Brazil | 5 | 0 | 1 | 4 | 100 | 145 | −45 | 1 | Eleventh place game |

Rules for classification: 1) points; 2) head-to-head points; 3) head-to-head goal difference; 4) head-to-head number of goals scored; 5) goal difference.
Notes:

| 24 July 1996; 11:45 | France | 27–25 | Spain | Georgia World Congress Center; Referees: Vujnović, Mladinić (CRO) |
| 24 July 1996; 11:45 | Kervadec 6 | (10–9) | Urdiales 8 | Georgia World Congress Center; Referees: Vujnović, Mladinić (CRO) |

| 24 July 1996; 16:15 | Egypt | 19–16 | Algeria | Georgia World Congress Center; Referees: Elbrønd, Løvqvist (DEN) |
| 24 July 1996; 16:15 | El-Geioushy 8 | (7–9) | Saidi 5 | Georgia World Congress Center; Referees: Elbrønd, Løvqvist (DEN) |

| 24 July 1996; 20:45 | Germany | 30–20 | Brazil | Georgia World Congress Center; Referees: Bojsen, Boehne (USA) |
| 24 July 1996; 20:45 | Löhr 7 | (12–7) | Barros 4 | Georgia World Congress Center; Referees: Bojsen, Boehne (USA) |

| 25 July 1996; 11:45 | Algeria | 22–33 | France | Georgia World Congress Center; Referees: Øie, Høgsnes (NOR) |
| 25 July 1996; 11:45 | Lamali 5 | (10–13) | Stoecklin 9 | Georgia World Congress Center; Referees: Øie, Høgsnes (NOR) |

| 25 July 1996; 16:15 | Spain | 22–20 | Germany | Georgia World Congress Center; Referees: Brussel, van Dongen (NED) |
| 25 July 1996; 16:15 | Garralda, Urdiales 5 | (11–10) | Zerbe 6 | Georgia World Congress Center; Referees: Brussel, van Dongen (NED) |

| 25 July 1996; 19:00 | Brazil | 20–31 | Egypt | Georgia World Congress Center; Referees: Al-Houli, Al-Enezi (KUW) |
| 25 July 1996; 19:00 | Barros 5 | (10–15) | Waress 6 | Georgia World Congress Center; Referees: Al-Houli, Al-Enezi (KUW) |

| 27 July 1996; 10:00 | Spain | 20–14 | Algeria | Georgia World Congress Center; Referees: Al-Houli, Al-Enezi (KUW) |
| 27 July 1996; 10:00 | Guijosa, Urdiales 6 | (12–5) | Khalfallah 3 | Georgia World Congress Center; Referees: Al-Houli, Al-Enezi (KUW) |

| 27 July 1996; 16:15 | Germany | 22–24 | Egypt | Georgia World Congress Center; Referees: Dăncescu, Mateescu (ROU) |
| 27 July 1996; 16:15 | Schwalb 6 | (9–11) | El-Attar 5 | Georgia World Congress Center; Referees: Dăncescu, Mateescu (ROU) |

| 27 July 1996; 20:45 | France | 37–23 | Brazil | Georgia World Congress Center; Referees: Moelle Mabounda, Mvoula (CGO) |
| 27 July 1996; 20:45 | Volle 14 | (16–10) | Pelissari 7 | Georgia World Congress Center; Referees: Moelle Mabounda, Mvoula (CGO) |

| 29 July 1996; 10:00 | Egypt | 20–25 | France | Georgia World Congress Center; Referees: Øie, Høgsnes (NOR) |
| 29 July 1996; 10:00 | Soliman 5 | (9–12) | Lathoud 8 | Georgia World Congress Center; Referees: Øie, Høgsnes (NOR) |

| 29 July 1996; 14:30 | Germany | 25–23 | Algeria | Georgia World Congress Center; Referees: Vujnović, Mladinić (CRO) |
| 29 July 1996; 14:30 | Kretzschmar 5 | (13–12) | Saidi 6 | Georgia World Congress Center; Referees: Vujnović, Mladinić (CRO) |

| 29 July 1996; 19:00 | Brazil | 17–27 | Spain | Georgia World Congress Center; Referees: Bojsen, Boehne (USA) |
| 29 July 1996; 19:00 | Hoffelder 7 | (10–12) | Urdangarín 6 | Georgia World Congress Center; Referees: Bojsen, Boehne (USA) |

| 31 July 1996; 11:45 | Egypt | 19–20 | Spain | Georgia World Congress Center; Referees: Gedvilas, Guterman (LTU) |
| 31 July 1996; 11:45 | Soliman 6 | (8–11) | Urdiales 8 | Georgia World Congress Center; Referees: Gedvilas, Guterman (LTU) |

| 31 July 1996; 16:15 | France | 23–24 | Germany | Georgia World Congress Center; Referees: Brussel, van Dongen (NED) |
| 31 July 1996; 16:15 | Prandi, Stoecklin 6 | (10–12) | Fegter 7 | Georgia World Congress Center; Referees: Brussel, van Dongen (NED) |

| 31 July 1996; 19:00 | Algeria | 20–20 | Brazil | Georgia World Congress Center; Referees: Moelle Mabounda, Mvoula (CGO) |
| 31 July 1996; 19:00 | Loukil, Nedjel Hammou 5 | (9–11) | Pinheiro 5 | Georgia World Congress Center; Referees: Moelle Mabounda, Mvoula (CGO) |

== Final round ==
=== Bracket ===
Semifinals
2 August
Sweden | 25
Spain | 20
2 August
France | 20
Croatia | 24

Final
4 August
Sweden | 26
Croatia | 27
Bronze medal match
4 August
Spain | 27
France | 25

=== Eleventh place game ===
| 2 August 1996; 10:00 | Kuwait | 25–31 | Brazil | Georgia World Congress Center; Referees: Boehne, Bojsen (USA) |
| 2 August 1996; 10:00 | Al-Harbi, Al-Zadah 5 | (13–16) | Nascimento 7 | Georgia World Congress Center; Referees: Boehne, Bojsen (USA) |

=== Ninth place game ===
2 August 1996
11:30
Algeria
26–27 (ET)
United States
Georgia World Congress Center
Referees: Al-Houli, Al-Enezi (KUW)
Saidi 6
(12–10)
Brown 7

FT: 22–22 ET: 4–5

=== Seventh place game ===
| 2 August 1996; 14:30 | Switzerland | 16–23 | Germany | Georgia World Congress Center; Referees: Elbrønd, Løvqvist (DEN) |
| 2 August 1996; 14:30 | Scharer 6 | (10–12) | Scheffler, Stephan 5 | Georgia World Congress Center; Referees: Elbrønd, Løvqvist (DEN) |

=== Fifth place game ===
| 2 August 1996; 19:00 | Egypt | 26–29 | Russia | Georgia World Congress Center; Referees: Gallego, Lamas (ESP) |
| 2 August 1996; 19:00 | El-Attar 10 | (11–15) | Gopin 6 | Georgia World Congress Center; Referees: Gallego, Lamas (ESP) |

=== Semifinals ===
| 2 August 1996; 16:15 | Sweden | 25–20 | Spain | Georgia World Congress Center; Referees: Brussel, van Dongen (NED) |
| 2 August 1996; 16:15 | Thorsson 7 | (11–12) | Guijosa 5 | Georgia World Congress Center; Referees: Brussel, van Dongen (NED) |

| 2 August 1996; 20:45 | France | 20–24 | Croatia | Georgia World Congress Center; Referees: Høgsnes, Øie (NOR) |
| 2 August 1996; 20:45 | Stoecklin 8 | (8–12) | Ćavar 8 | Georgia World Congress Center; Referees: Høgsnes, Øie (NOR) |

=== Bronze medal game ===
| 4 August 1996; 11:00 | Spain | 27–25 | France | Georgia World Congress Center; Referees: Elbrønd, Løvqvist (DEN) |
| 4 August 1996; 11:00 | three players 5 | (13–12) | Cordinier 7 | Georgia World Congress Center; Referees: Elbrønd, Løvqvist (DEN) |

=== Final ===
| 4 August 1996; 12:45 | Sweden | 26–27 | Croatia | Georgia Dome; Attendance: 35,000; Referees: Gallego, Lamas (ESP) |
| 4 August 1996; 12:45 | Thorsson 8 | (11–16) | three players 6 | Georgia Dome; Attendance: 35,000; Referees: Gallego, Lamas (ESP) |

== Rankings and statistics ==
Final rankings
| 1 | Croatia |
| 2 | Sweden |
| 3 | Spain |
| 4 | France |
| 5 | Russia |
| 6 | Egypt |
| 7 | Germany |
| 8 | Switzerland |
| 9 | United States |
| 10 | Algeria |
| 11 | Brazil |
| 12 | Kuwait |

Top goalscorers
| Player | Games | Goals | Attempts |
|---|---|---|---|
| 1. Patrik Ćavar (CRO) | 6 | 43 | 60 |
| 2. Stéphane Stoecklin (FRA) | 6 | 36 | 68 |
| 3. Frédéric Volle (FRA) | 7 | 35 | 58 |
| 4. Marc Baumgartner (SUI) | 6 | 35 | 71 |
| 5. Alberto Urdiales (ESP) | 7 | 31 | 47 |
| 6. Irfan Smajlagić (CRO) | 6 | 31 | 48 |
| 7. Valery Gopin (RUS) | 6 | 30 | 42 |
| 7. Erik Hajas (SWE) | 6 | 30 | 42 |
| 7. Pierre Thorsson (SWE) | 6 | 30 | 42 |

All-star team
Mats Olsson (SWE)
| Irfan Smajlagić (CRO) | Magnus Andersson (SWE) | Stéphane Stoecklin (FRA) |
| Dmitri Torgovanov (RUS) | Patrik Ćavar (CRO) | Frédéric Volle (FRA) |
