= Digranes =

- Kópavogur District
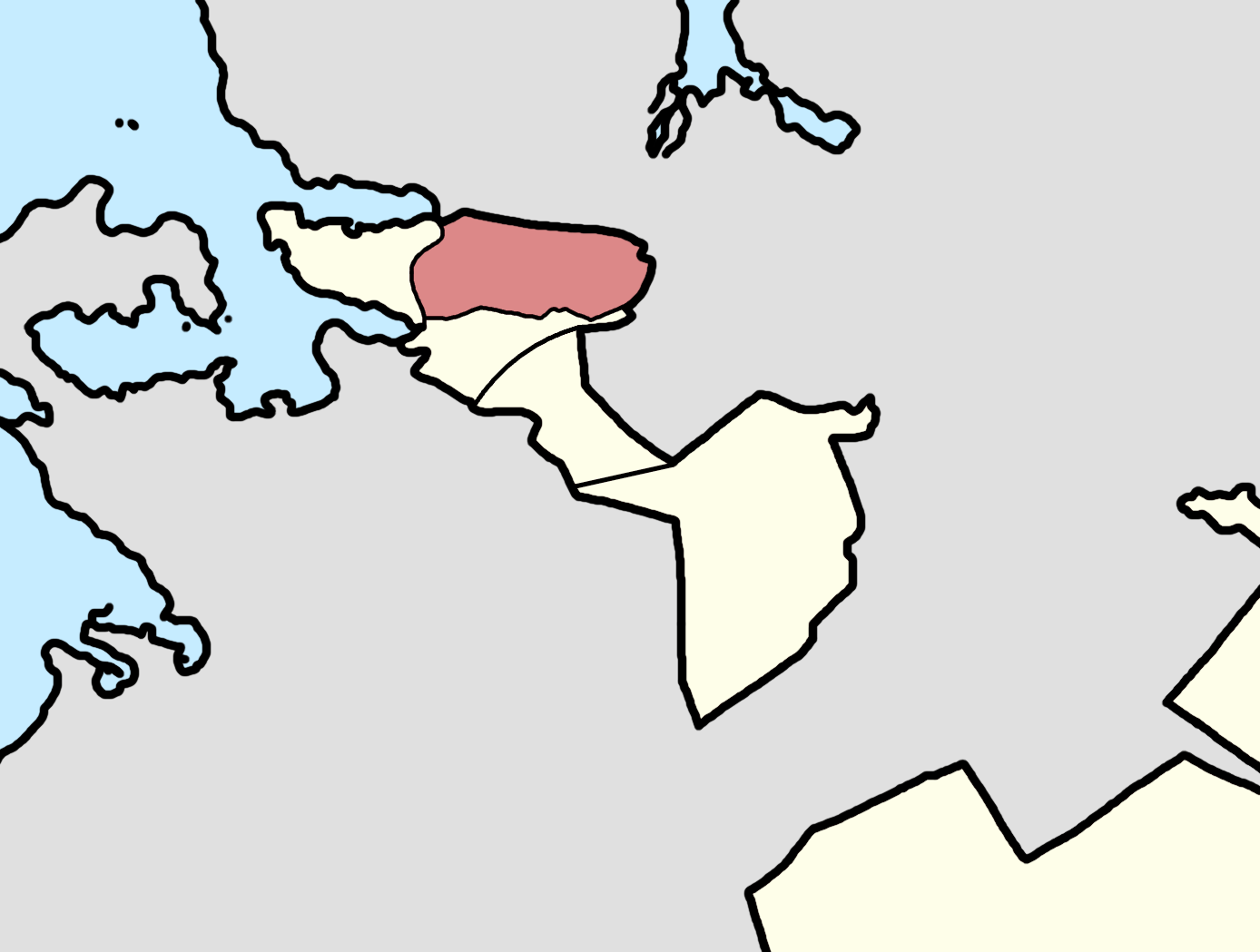
- Location of Digranes within Kópavogur
- Coordinates: 64.111°N 21.880°W
- Country: Iceland
- Constituency: Southwest
- Region: Capital Region
- Municipality: Kópavogur
- Notable landmarks: Kópavogsdalur, Víghóll

Area
  - Total: 3.4 km^{2} (1.3 sq mi)

Population
  - Total: 4,968
  - Density: 14.6/km^{2} (38/sq mi)
- Postal code: 200

Digranes (Icelandic pronunciation: [ˈtɪɣraˌnɛːs]) is one of the 5 districts of Kópavogur. The district's borders are defined by the Hafnarfjarðarvegur in the west, Kópavogslækur in the south, Fossvogslækur in the north and the Reykjanesbraut in the east.

== History ==
Digranes is one of the oldest settlements within the city limits of Kópavogur, with agriculture arising on the land between 1300 and 1313.

Digranes was once crown land, its land rent totalling some 90 acres in 1703. Land rent was paid with fish and butter in Market Towns (Icelandic: Kaupstaðir) and Bessastaðir. The land remained under royal possession when the majority of crown land was sold off in the second half of the 19th century, thus becoming public land (Icelandic: Þjóðjörð).

Urbanization in Digranes arose in the 1930s when agriculture was abolished on the land in 1936. Prior to that, the Búnaðarfélag Íslands was responsible for allocating lots on the land. The last practicing farmer in Digranes was Jón Guðmundsson, who worked from 1896 to 1936.
