= 1995 World Men's Handball Championship =

Tournament details
- Host country: Iceland
- Venue(s): 5 (in 4 host cities)
- Dates: 7–21 May
- Teams: 24 (from 4 confederations)

Final positions
- Champions: France (1st title)
- Runner-up: Croatia
- Third place: Sweden
- Fourth place: Germany

Tournament statistics
- Matches played: 88
- Goals scored: 4,283 (48.67 per match)
- Top scorer(s): (South Korea) Yoon Kyung-shin (86 goals)

The 1995 World Men's Handball Championship was the 14th team handball World Championship. It was held in Iceland between 7–21 May 1995. France won the championship. Games were played in Reykjavík, Hafnarfjörður, Akureyri and Kópavogur.

== Qualification ==
Competition	Dates	Vacancies	Qualified
Host nation		1	Iceland
1993 World Men's Handball Championship	10–20 March 1993	8	Russia; France; Sweden; Switzerland; Spain; Germany; Czech Republic; Denmark
1993 Asian Men's Handball Championship	24 September – 5 October 1993	3	South Korea; Kuwait; Japan
1994 European Men's Handball Championship	3–12 June 1994	4	Croatia; Hungary; Belarus; Slovenia
1994 Pan American Men's Handball Championship	16–23 September 1994	3	Cuba; Brazil; United States
1994 African Men's Handball Championship	5–24 November 1994	4	Tunisia; Algeria; Egypt; Morocco
EHF v OCHF Play-off	9–12 December 1994	1	Romania

== Preliminary round ==
=== Group A ===
Pos	Team	Pld	W	D	L	GF	GA	GD	Pts	Qualification
1	Switzerland	5	5	0	0	133	103	+30	10	Round of 16
2	South Korea	5	4	0	1	140	112	+28	8	Round of 16
3	Iceland	5	3	0	2	119	107	+12	6	Round of 16
4	Tunisia	5	2	0	3	110	125	−15	4	Round of 16
5	Hungary	5	1	0	4	119	121	−2	2	
6	United States	5	0	0	5	82	135	−53	0	

7 May 1995; 15:00	Switzerland	26–22	Tunisia	Laugardalshöll, Reykjavík; Attendance: 1,500; Referees: Johansson, Kjellqvist (SWE)
7 May 1995; 15:00		(15–10)		Laugardalshöll, Reykjavík; Attendance: 1,500; Referees: Johansson, Kjellqvist (SWE)

7 May 1995; 17:00	Hungary	26–29	South Korea	Laugardalshöll, Reykjavík; Attendance: 2,200; Referees: Garcia, Moreno (FRA)
7 May 1995; 17:00		(11–14)		Laugardalshöll, Reykjavík; Attendance: 2,200; Referees: Garcia, Moreno (FRA)

7 May 1995; 20:00	Iceland	27–16	United States	Laugardalshöll, Reykjavík; Attendance: 5,000; Referees: Gallego, Lamas (ESP)
7 May 1995; 20:00		(13–11)		Laugardalshöll, Reykjavík; Attendance: 5,000; Referees: Gallego, Lamas (ESP)

9 May 1995; 15:00	United States	14–26	Hungary	Laugardalshöll, Reykjavík; Attendance: 100; Referees: Elbrønd, Løvqvist (DEN)
9 May 1995; 15:00		(7–13)		Laugardalshöll, Reykjavík; Attendance: 100; Referees: Elbrønd, Løvqvist (DEN)

9 May 1995; 17:00	South Korea	22–25	Switzerland	Laugardalshöll, Reykjavík; Attendance: 300; Referees: Bülow, Lübker (GER)
9 May 1995; 17:00		(6–10)		Laugardalshöll, Reykjavík; Attendance: 300; Referees: Bülow, Lübker (GER)

9 May 1995; 20:00	Tunisia	21–25	Iceland	Laugardalshöll, Reykjavík; Attendance: 1,100; Referees: Thomas, Thomas (GER)
9 May 1995; 20:00		(7–13)		Laugardalshöll, Reykjavík; Attendance: 1,100; Referees: Thomas, Thomas (GER)

10 May 1995; 15:00	Switzerland	28–15	United States	Laugardalshöll, Reykjavík; Attendance: 150; Referees: Dancescu, Mateescu (ROU)
10 May 1995; 15:00		(12–7)		Laugardalshöll, Reykjavík; Attendance: 150; Referees: Dancescu, Mateescu (ROU)

10 May 1995; 17:00	Tunisia	18–33	South Korea	Laugardalshöll, Reykjavík; Attendance: 300; Referees: Gallego, Lamas (ESP)
10 May 1995; 17:00		(7–16)		Laugardalshöll, Reykjavík; Attendance: 300; Referees: Gallego, Lamas (ESP)

10 May 1995; 20:00	Iceland	23–20	Hungary	Laugardalshöll, Reykjavík; Attendance: 4,200; Referees: Johansson, Kjellqvist (SWE)
10 May 1995; 20:00		(11–9)		Laugardalshöll, Reykjavík; Attendance: 4,200; Referees: Johansson, Kjellqvist (SWE)

12 May 1995; 15:00	Hungary	23–30	Switzerland	Laugardalshöll, Reykjavík; Attendance: 3,400; Referees: Broman, Blademo (SWE)
12 May 1995; 15:00		(10–15)		Laugardalshöll, Reykjavík; Attendance: 3,400; Referees: Broman, Blademo (SWE)

12 May 1995; 17:00	Iceland	23–26	South Korea	Laugardalshöll, Reykjavík; Attendance: 5,400; Referees: Dancescu, Mateescu (ROU)
12 May 1995; 17:00		(10–12)		Laugardalshöll, Reykjavík; Attendance: 5,400; Referees: Dancescu, Mateescu (ROU)

12 May 1995; 20:00	United States	17–24	Tunisia	Laugardalshöll, Reykjavík; Attendance: 1,200; Referees: Johansson, Kjellqvist (SWE)
12 May 1995; 20:00		(9–12)		Laugardalshöll, Reykjavík; Attendance: 1,200; Referees: Johansson, Kjellqvist (SWE)

13 May 1995; 16:00	Switzerland	24–21	Iceland	Laugardalshöll, Reykjavík; Attendance: 5,200; Referees: Elbrønd, Løvqvist (DEN)
13 May 1995; 16:00		(11–10)		Laugardalshöll, Reykjavík; Attendance: 5,200; Referees: Elbrønd, Løvqvist (DEN)

14 May 1995; 13:00	Hungary	24–25	Tunisia	Laugardalshöll, Reykjavík; Attendance: 240; Referees: Bülow, Lübker (GER)
14 May 1995; 13:00		(15–12)		Laugardalshöll, Reykjavík; Attendance: 240; Referees: Bülow, Lübker (GER)

14 May 1995; 13:00	South Korea	30–20	United States	Digranes, Kópavogur; Attendance: 150; Referees: Masi, Di Piero (ITA)
14 May 1995; 13:00		(14–7)		Digranes, Kópavogur; Attendance: 150; Referees: Masi, Di Piero (ITA)

=== Group B ===
Pos	Team	Pld	W	D	L	GF	GA	GD	Pts	Qualification
1	Croatia	5	4	0	1	140	119	+21	8	Round of 16
2	Russia	5	4	0	1	112	96	+16	8	Round of 16
3	Czech Republic	5	4	0	1	121	111	+10	8	Round of 16
4	Cuba	5	2	0	3	136	132	+4	4	Round of 16
5	Slovenia	5	1	0	4	131	126	+5	2	
6	Morocco	5	0	0	5	93	149	−56	0	

8 May 1995; 15:00	Russia	21–17	Cuba	Kaplakriki, Hafnarfjörður; Attendance: 250; Referees: Brosio, Zavorotny (ARG)
8 May 1995; 15:00		(10–9)		Kaplakriki, Hafnarfjörður; Attendance: 250; Referees: Brosio, Zavorotny (ARG)

8 May 1995; 17:00	Czech Republic	25–16	Morocco	Kaplakriki, Hafnarfjörður; Attendance: 160; Referees: Arnaldsson, Erlingsson (ISL)
8 May 1995; 17:00		(12–8)		Kaplakriki, Hafnarfjörður; Attendance: 160; Referees: Arnaldsson, Erlingsson (ISL)

8 May 1995; 20:00	Croatia	26–24	Slovenia	Kaplakriki, Hafnarfjörður; Attendance: 500; Referees: Børresen, Strand (NOR)
8 May 1995; 20:00		(13–9)		Kaplakriki, Hafnarfjörður; Attendance: 500; Referees: Børresen, Strand (NOR)

9 May 1995; 15:00	Cuba	26–29	Czech Republic	Kaplakriki, Hafnarfjörður; Attendance: 200; Referees: Dancescu, Mateescu (ROU)
9 May 1995; 15:00		(12–16)		Kaplakriki, Hafnarfjörður; Attendance: 200; Referees: Dancescu, Mateescu (ROU)

9 May 1995; 17:00	Slovenia	22–27	Russia	Kaplakriki, Hafnarfjörður; Attendance: 250; Referees: Broman, Blademo (SWE)
9 May 1995; 17:00		(12–13)		Kaplakriki, Hafnarfjörður; Attendance: 250; Referees: Broman, Blademo (SWE)

9 May 1995; 20:00	Morocco	21–33	Croatia	Kaplakriki, Hafnarfjörður; Attendance: 200; Referees: Garcia, Moreno (FRA)
9 May 1995; 20:00		(8–15)		Kaplakriki, Hafnarfjörður; Attendance: 200; Referees: Garcia, Moreno (FRA)

11 May 1995; 15:00	Cuba	34–26	Slovenia	Kaplakriki, Hafnarfjörður; Attendance: 240; Referees: Garcia, Moreno (FRA)
11 May 1995; 15:00		(17–16)		Kaplakriki, Hafnarfjörður; Attendance: 240; Referees: Garcia, Moreno (FRA)

11 May 1995; 17:00	Czech Republic	27–25	Croatia	Kaplakriki, Hafnarfjörður; Attendance: 396; Referees: Bülow, Lübker (GER)
11 May 1995; 17:00		(12–13)		Kaplakriki, Hafnarfjörður; Attendance: 396; Referees: Bülow, Lübker (GER)

11 May 1995; 20:00	Russia	22–15	Morocco	Kaplakriki, Hafnarfjörður; Attendance: 310; Referees: Elbrønd, Løvqvist (DEN)
11 May 1995; 20:00		(12–8)		Kaplakriki, Hafnarfjörður; Attendance: 310; Referees: Elbrønd, Løvqvist (DEN)

12 May 1995; 15:00	Czech Republic	23–22	Slovenia	Kaplakriki, Hafnarfjörður; Attendance: 480; Referees: Gallego, Lamas (ESP)
12 May 1995; 15:00		(11–12)		Kaplakriki, Hafnarfjörður; Attendance: 480; Referees: Gallego, Lamas (ESP)

12 May 1995; 17:00	Croatia	25–20	Russia	Kaplakriki, Hafnarfjörður; Attendance: 500; Referees: Thomas, Thomas (GER)
12 May 1995; 17:00		(14–9)		Kaplakriki, Hafnarfjörður; Attendance: 500; Referees: Thomas, Thomas (GER)

12 May 1995; 20:00	Morocco	25–32	Cuba	Kaplakriki, Hafnarfjörður; Attendance: 410; Referees: Bülow, Lübker (GER)
12 May 1995; 20:00		(8–13)		Kaplakriki, Hafnarfjörður; Attendance: 410; Referees: Bülow, Lübker (GER)

14 May 1995; 15:00	Slovenia	37–16	Morocco	Kaplakriki, Hafnarfjörður; Attendance: 242; Referees: Thomas, Thomas (GER)
14 May 1995; 15:00		(18–9)		Kaplakriki, Hafnarfjörður; Attendance: 242; Referees: Thomas, Thomas (GER)

14 May 1995; 17:00	Croatia	31–27	Cuba	Kaplakriki, Hafnarfjörður; Attendance: 360; Referees: Elbrønd, Løvqvist (DEN)
14 May 1995; 17:00		(13–16)		Kaplakriki, Hafnarfjörður; Attendance: 360; Referees: Elbrønd, Løvqvist (DEN)

14 May 1995; 20:00	Russia	22–17	Czech Republic	Kaplakriki, Hafnarfjörður; Attendance: 1,490; Referees: Garcia, Moreno (FRA)
14 May 1995; 20:00		(11–9)		Kaplakriki, Hafnarfjörður; Attendance: 1,490; Referees: Garcia, Moreno (FRA)

=== Group C ===
Pos	Team	Pld	W	D	L	GF	GA	GD	Pts	Qualification
1	Germany	5	5	0	0	128	93	+35	10	Round of 16
2	Romania	5	3	0	2	121	121	0	6	Round of 16
3	France	5	3	0	2	122	108	+14	6	Round of 16
4	Algeria	5	2	0	3	103	113	−10	4	Round of 16
5	Denmark	5	2	0	3	126	117	+9	4	
6	Japan	5	0	0	5	101	149	−48	0	

8 May 1995; 15:00	France	33–20	Japan	Smárinn, Kópavogur; Attendance: 350; Referees: Johansson, Kjellqvist (SWE)
8 May 1995; 15:00		(17–6)		Smárinn, Kópavogur; Attendance: 350; Referees: Johansson, Kjellqvist (SWE)

8 May 1995; 17:00	Germany	27–19	Romania	Smárinn, Kópavogur; Attendance: 978; Referees: Gallego, Lamas (SWE)
8 May 1995; 17:00		(11–11)		Smárinn, Kópavogur; Attendance: 978; Referees: Gallego, Lamas (SWE)

8 May 1995; 20:00	Denmark	24–25	Algeria	Smárinn, Kópavogur; Attendance: 1,100; Referees: Broman, Blademo (SWE)
8 May 1995; 20:00		(9–16)		Smárinn, Kópavogur; Attendance: 1,100; Referees: Broman, Blademo (SWE)

10 May 1995; 15:00	Algeria	21–23	France	Smárinn, Kópavogur; Attendance: 100; Referees: Arnaldsson, Erlingsson (ISL)
10 May 1995; 15:00		(9–12)		Smárinn, Kópavogur; Attendance: 100; Referees: Arnaldsson, Erlingsson (ISL)

10 May 1995; 17:00	Japan	19–30	Germany	Smárinn, Kópavogur; Attendance: 150; Referees: Børresen, Strand (NOR)
10 May 1995; 17:00		(9–15)		Smárinn, Kópavogur; Attendance: 150; Referees: Børresen, Strand (NOR)

10 May 1995; 20:00	Romania	24–28	Denmark	Smárinn, Kópavogur; Attendance: 200; Referees: Brosio, Zavorotny (ARG)
10 May 1995; 20:00		(13–14)		Smárinn, Kópavogur; Attendance: 200; Referees: Brosio, Zavorotny (ARG)

11 May 1995; 15:00	Japan	18–20	Algeria	Smárinn, Kópavogur; Attendance: 300; Referees: Brosio, Zavorotny (ARG)
11 May 1995; 15:00		(7–9)		Smárinn, Kópavogur; Attendance: 300; Referees: Brosio, Zavorotny (ARG)

11 May 1995; 17:00	Germany	24–18	Denmark	Smárinn, Kópavogur; Attendance: 1,500; Referees: Arnaldsson, Erlingsson (ISL)
11 May 1995; 17:00		(11–9)		Smárinn, Kópavogur; Attendance: 1,500; Referees: Arnaldsson, Erlingsson (ISL)

11 May 1995; 20:00	France	22–23	Romania	Smárinn, Kópavogur; Attendance: 1,200; Referees: Brussel, Van Dongen (NED)
11 May 1995; 20:00		(11–13)		Smárinn, Kópavogur; Attendance: 1,200; Referees: Brussel, Van Dongen (NED)

13 May 1995; 14:00	Germany	24–15	Algeria	Laugardalshöll, Reykjavík; Attendance: 2,200; Referees: Brussel, Van Dongen (NED)
13 May 1995; 14:00		(10–8)		Laugardalshöll, Reykjavík; Attendance: 2,200; Referees: Brussel, Van Dongen (NED)

13 May 1995; 14:00	Romania	31–22	Japan	Digranes, Kópavogur; Attendance: 100; Referees: Øie, Høgsnes (NOR)
13 May 1995; 14:00		(13–11)		Digranes, Kópavogur; Attendance: 100; Referees: Øie, Høgsnes (NOR)

13 May 1995; 16:00	Denmark	21–22	France	Digranes, Kópavogur; Attendance: 300; Referees: Arnaldsson, Erlingsson (ISL)
13 May 1995; 16:00		(9–11)		Digranes, Kópavogur; Attendance: 300; Referees: Arnaldsson, Erlingsson (ISL)

14 May 1995; 15:00	Denmark	35–22	Japan	Digranes, Kópavogur; Attendance: 500; Referees: Brussel, Van Dongen (NED)
14 May 1995; 15:00		(15–9)		Digranes, Kópavogur; Attendance: 500; Referees: Brussel, Van Dongen (NED)

14 May 1995; 17:00	France	22–23	Germany	Digranes, Kópavogur; Attendance: 850; Referees: Børresen, Strand (NOR)
14 May 1995; 17:00		(11–11)		Digranes, Kópavogur; Attendance: 850; Referees: Børresen, Strand (NOR)

14 May 1995; 20:00	Algeria	22–24	Romania	Digranes, Kópavogur; Attendance: 500; Referees: Brosio, Zavorotny (ARG)
14 May 1995; 20:00		(7–10)		Digranes, Kópavogur; Attendance: 500; Referees: Brosio, Zavorotny (ARG)

=== Group D ===
Pos	Team	Pld	W	D	L	GF	GA	GD	Pts	Qualification
1	Sweden	5	5	0	0	151	114	+37	10	Round of 16
2	Spain	5	4	0	1	123	104	+19	8	Round of 16
3	Egypt	5	3	0	2	111	106	+5	6	Round of 16
4	Belarus	5	2	0	3	154	125	+29	4	Round of 16
5	Kuwait	5	1	0	4	85	131	−46	2	
6	Brazil	5	0	0	5	96	140	−44	0	

8 May 1995; 15:00	Spain	24–21	Kuwait	Akureyri Sports Hall, Akureyri; Attendance: 400; Referees: Szajna, Wróblewski (POL)
8 May 1995; 15:00		(9–9)		Akureyri Sports Hall, Akureyri; Attendance: 400; Referees: Szajna, Wróblewski (POL)

8 May 1995; 17:00	Sweden	29–28	Belarus	Akureyri Sports Hall, Akureyri; Attendance: 600; Referees: Masi, Di Piero (ITA)
8 May 1995; 17:00		(15–9)		Akureyri Sports Hall, Akureyri; Attendance: 600; Referees: Masi, Di Piero (ITA)

8 May 1995; 20:00	Egypt	32–20	Brazil	Akureyri Sports Hall, Akureyri; Attendance: 460; Referees: Øie, Høgsnes (NOR)
8 May 1995; 20:00		(19–10)		Akureyri Sports Hall, Akureyri; Attendance: 460; Referees: Øie, Høgsnes (NOR)

9 May 1995; 15:00	Belarus	27–30	Spain	Akureyri Sports Hall, Akureyri; Attendance: 250; Referees: Brussel, Van Dongen (NED)
9 May 1995; 15:00		(13–12)		Akureyri Sports Hall, Akureyri; Attendance: 250; Referees: Brussel, Van Dongen (NED)

9 May 1995; 17:00	Brazil	21–29	Sweden	Akureyri Sports Hall, Akureyri; Attendance: 50; Referees: Rudin, Schill (SUI)
9 May 1995; 17:00		(9–15)		Akureyri Sports Hall, Akureyri; Attendance: 50; Referees: Rudin, Schill (SUI)

9 May 1995; 20:00	Kuwait	0–10 (Note: The final score retained by the IHF for the Kuwait-Egypt match is 0-10 instead of 21-28, which could indicate a disqualification of Kuwait.)	Egypt	Akureyri Sports Hall, Akureyri; Attendance: 118; Referees: Masi, Di Piero (ITA)

11 May 1995; 15:00	Belarus	34–21	Brazil	Akureyri Sports Hall, Akureyri; Attendance: 100; Referees: Szajna, Wróblewski (POL)
11 May 1995; 15:00		(15–7)		Akureyri Sports Hall, Akureyri; Attendance: 100; Referees: Szajna, Wróblewski (POL)

11 May 1995; 17:00	Sweden	37–22	Kuwait	Akureyri Sports Hall, Akureyri; Attendance: 120; Referees: Øie, Høgsnes (NOR)
11 May 1995; 17:00		(19–12)		Akureyri Sports Hall, Akureyri; Attendance: 120; Referees: Øie, Høgsnes (NOR)

11 May 1995; 20:00	Spain	27–20	Egypt	Akureyri Sports Hall, Akureyri; Attendance: 202; Referees: Rudin, Schill (SUI)
11 May 1995; 20:00		(13–10)		Akureyri Sports Hall, Akureyri; Attendance: 202; Referees: Rudin, Schill (SUI)

12 May 1995; 15:00	Kuwait	18–39	Belarus	Akureyri Sports Hall, Akureyri; Attendance: 300; Referees: Rudin, Schill (SUI)
12 May 1995; 15:00		(11–23)		Akureyri Sports Hall, Akureyri; Attendance: 300; Referees: Rudin, Schill (SUI)

12 May 1995; 17:00	Egypt	22–33	Sweden	Akureyri Sports Hall, Akureyri; Attendance: 503; Referees: Børresen, Strand (NOR)
12 May 1995; 17:00		(12–16)		Akureyri Sports Hall, Akureyri; Attendance: 503; Referees: Børresen, Strand (NOR)

12 May 1995; 20:00	Spain	21–13	Brazil	Akureyri Sports Hall, Akureyri; Attendance: 550; Referees: Brosio, Zavorotny (ARG)
12 May 1995; 20:00		(9–3)		Akureyri Sports Hall, Akureyri; Attendance: 550; Referees: Brosio, Zavorotny (ARG)

14 May 1995; 15:00	Brazil	21–24	Kuwait	Akureyri Sports Hall, Akureyri; Attendance: 830; Referees: Sigurðsson, Sigurjónsson (ISL)
14 May 1995; 15:00		(6–9)		Akureyri Sports Hall, Akureyri; Attendance: 830; Referees: Sigurðsson, Sigurjónsson (ISL)

14 May 1995; 17:00	Sweden	23–21	Spain	Akureyri Sports Hall, Akureyri; Attendance: 1,004; Referees: Øie, Høgsnes (NOR)
14 May 1995; 17:00		(14–10)		Akureyri Sports Hall, Akureyri; Attendance: 1,004; Referees: Øie, Høgsnes (NOR)

14 May 1995; 20:00	Egypt	27–26	Belarus	Akureyri Sports Hall, Akureyri; Attendance: 1,011; Referees: Arnaldsson, Erlingsson (ISL)
14 May 1995; 20:00		(14–10)		Akureyri Sports Hall, Akureyri; Attendance: 1,011; Referees: Arnaldsson, Erlingsson (ISL)

== Knockout stage ==
=== Bracket ===
Round of 16
16 May
Iceland	12
Russia	25
16 May
Germany	33
Belarus	26
16 May
Switzerland	27
Cuba	26
16 May
France	23
Spain	20
16 May
Croatia (pen.)	29
Tunisia	28
16 May
Egypt	31
Romania	26
16 May
Sweden	28
Algeria	22
16 May
Czech Republic (OT)	26
South Korea	25

Quarterfinals
17 May
Russia	17
Germany	20
17 May
Switzerland	18
France	28
17 May
Croatia	30
Egypt	16
17 May
Sweden	21
Czech Republic	17

Semifinals
19 May
Germany	20
France	22
19 May
Croatia	28
Sweden	25

Final
21 May
France	23
Croatia	19
Third place
21 May
Sweden	26
Germany	20

5–8th place semifinals
19 May
Czech Republic	21
Egypt	25
19 May
Switzerland	23
Russia	25

Fifth place
20 May
Egypt	28
Russia (OT)	31
Seventh place
20 May
Czech Republic	21
Switzerland	23

9–16th place quarterfinals
17 May
Tunisia	25
Romania	33
17 May
Algeria	25
South Korea	33
17 May
Iceland	23
Belarus	28
17 May
Cuba	29
Spain	32

9–12th place semifinals
19 May
Romania	34
South Korea	29
19 May
Belarus	35
Spain	34

Ninth place
20 May
Romania	32
Belarus	35
Eleventh place
20 May
Spain	27
South Korea	22

=== Round of 16 ===
16 May 1995
15:00
Croatia
29–28 (ET)
Tunisia
Digranes, Kópavogur
Attendance: 350
Referees: Thomas, Thomas (GER)

(8–10)

FT: 18–18 ET: 2–2, 5–5 Pen: 4–3

16 May 1995
15:00
Czech Republic
26–25 (ET)
South Korea
Laugardalshöll, Reykjavík
Attendance: 850
Referees: Arnaldsson, Erlingsson (ISL)

(9–8)

FT: 23–23 ET: 3–2

16 May 1995; 17:00	Germany	33–26	Belarus	Digranes, Kópavogur; Attendance: 500; Referees: Øie, Høgsnes (NOR)
16 May 1995; 17:00		(15–13)		Digranes, Kópavogur; Attendance: 500; Referees: Øie, Høgsnes (NOR)

16 May 1995; 17:00	Switzerland	27–26	Cuba	Laugardalshöll, Reykjavík; Attendance: 3,000; Referees: Johansson, Kjellqvist (SWE)
16 May 1995; 17:00		(16–9)		Laugardalshöll, Reykjavík; Attendance: 3,000; Referees: Johansson, Kjellqvist (SWE)

16 May 1995; 17:00	France	23–20	Spain	Akureyri Sports Hall, Akureyri; Attendance: 440; Referees: Elbrønd, Løvqvist (DEN)
16 May 1995; 17:00		(12–9)		Akureyri Sports Hall, Akureyri; Attendance: 440; Referees: Elbrønd, Løvqvist (DEN)

16 May 1995; 20:00	Iceland	12–25	Russia	Laugardalshöll, Reykjavík; Attendance: 5,200; Referees: Gallego, Lamas (ESP)
16 May 1995; 20:00		(8–11)		Laugardalshöll, Reykjavík; Attendance: 5,200; Referees: Gallego, Lamas (ESP)

16 May 1995; 20:00	Egypt	31–26	Romania	Digranes, Kópavogur; Attendance: 400; Referees: Børresen, Strand (NOR)
16 May 1995; 20:00		(13–14)		Digranes, Kópavogur; Attendance: 400; Referees: Børresen, Strand (NOR)

16 May 1995; 20:00	Sweden	28–22	Algeria	Akureyri Sports Hall, Akureyri; Attendance: 447; Referees: Dancescu, Mateescu (ROU)
16 May 1995; 20:00		(16–12)		Akureyri Sports Hall, Akureyri; Attendance: 447; Referees: Dancescu, Mateescu (ROU)

=== 9–16th place quarterfinals ===
17 May 1995; 15:00	Cuba	29–32	Spain	Kaplakriki, Hafnarfjörður; Attendance: 25; Referees: Garcia, Moreno (FRA)
17 May 1995; 15:00		(18–16)		Kaplakriki, Hafnarfjörður; Attendance: 25; Referees: Garcia, Moreno (FRA)

17 May 1995; 17:15	Algeria	21–33	South Korea	Akureyri Sports Hall, Akureyri; Attendance: 468; Referees: Gallego, Lamas (ESP)
17 May 1995; 17:15		(13–16)		Akureyri Sports Hall, Akureyri; Attendance: 468; Referees: Gallego, Lamas (ESP)

17 May 1995; 20:00	Tunisia	25–33	Romania	Kaplakriki, Hafnarfjörður; Attendance: 100; Referees: Broman, Blademo (SWE)
17 May 1995; 20:00		(13–17)		Kaplakriki, Hafnarfjörður; Attendance: 100; Referees: Broman, Blademo (SWE)

17 May 1995; 20:00	Iceland	23–28	Belarus	Laugardalshöll, Reykjavík; Attendance: 1,500; Referees: Thomas, Thomas (GER)
17 May 1995; 20:00		(15–15)		Laugardalshöll, Reykjavík; Attendance: 1,500; Referees: Thomas, Thomas (GER)

=== Quarterfinals ===
17 May 1995; 15:00	Switzerland	18–28	France	Laugardalshöll, Reykjavík; Attendance: 950; Referees: Øie, Høgsnes (NOR)
17 May 1995; 15:00		(7–15)		Laugardalshöll, Reykjavík; Attendance: 950; Referees: Øie, Høgsnes (NOR)

17 May 1995; 17:15	Russia	17–20	Germany	Laugardalshöll, Reykjavík; Attendance: 900; Referees: Børresen, Strand (NOR)
17 May 1995; 17:15		(7–12)		Laugardalshöll, Reykjavík; Attendance: 900; Referees: Børresen, Strand (NOR)

17 May 1995; 17:15	Croatia	30–16	Egypt	Kaplakriki, Hafnarfjörður; Attendance: 125; Referees: Brussel, Van Dongen (NED)
17 May 1995; 17:15		(13–8)		Kaplakriki, Hafnarfjörður; Attendance: 125; Referees: Brussel, Van Dongen (NED)

17 May 1995; 20:00	Sweden	21–17	Czech Republic	Akureyri Sports Hall, Akureyri; Attendance: 657; Referees: Bülow, Lübker (GER)
17 May 1995; 20:00		(9–9)		Akureyri Sports Hall, Akureyri; Attendance: 657; Referees: Bülow, Lübker (GER)

=== 9–12th place semifinals ===
19 May 1995
13:00
Belarus
35–34 (ET)
Spain
Kaplakriki, Hafnarfjörður
Attendance: 250
Referees: Bülow, Lübker (GER)

(13–15)

FT: 30–30 ET: 5–4

19 May 1995; 15:00	Romania	34–29	South Korea	Kaplakriki, Hafnarfjörður; Attendance: 280; Referees: Masi, Di Piero (ITA)
19 May 1995; 15:00		(15–14)		Kaplakriki, Hafnarfjörður; Attendance: 280; Referees: Masi, Di Piero (ITA)

=== 5–8th place semifinals ===
19 May 1995; 13:00	Czech Republic	21–25	Egypt	Laugardalshöll, Reykjavík; Attendance: 100; Referees: Dancescu, Mateescu (ROU)
19 May 1995; 13:00		(7–10)		Laugardalshöll, Reykjavík; Attendance: 100; Referees: Dancescu, Mateescu (ROU)

19 May 1995; 15:00	Switzerland	23–25	Russia	Laugardalshöll, Reykjavík; Attendance: 300; Referees: Brussel, Van Dongen (NED)
19 May 1995; 15:00		(8–11)		Laugardalshöll, Reykjavík; Attendance: 300; Referees: Brussel, Van Dongen (NED)

=== Semifinals ===
19 May 1995; 18:00	Germany	20–22	France	Laugardalshöll, Reykjavík; Attendance: 1,240; Referees: Elbrønd, Løvqvist (DEN)
19 May 1995; 18:00		(8–11)		Laugardalshöll, Reykjavík; Attendance: 1,240; Referees: Elbrønd, Løvqvist (DEN)

19 May 1995; 20:00	Croatia	28–25	Sweden	Laugardalshöll, Reykjavík; Attendance: 2,000; Referees: Gallego, Lamas (ESP)
19 May 1995; 20:00		(16–7)		Laugardalshöll, Reykjavík; Attendance: 2,000; Referees: Gallego, Lamas (ESP)

=== Eleventh place game ===
20 May 1995; 15:00	Spain	27–22	South Korea	Kaplakriki, Hafnarfjörður; Referees: Broman, Blademo (SWE)
20 May 1995; 15:00	Munaíz 6	(17–12)	Yoon 10	Kaplakriki, Hafnarfjörður; Referees: Broman, Blademo (SWE)
20 May 1995; 15:00	3× (suspension)			Kaplakriki, Hafnarfjörður; Referees: Broman, Blademo (SWE)

=== Ninth place game ===
20 May 1995; 17:00	Romania	32–35	Belarus	Kaplakriki, Hafnarfjörður; Attendance: 87; Referees: Garcia, Moreno (FRA)
20 May 1995; 17:00	Mocanu 7	(17–16)	Parashchenko 9	Kaplakriki, Hafnarfjörður; Attendance: 87; Referees: Garcia, Moreno (FRA)
20 May 1995; 17:00	1× (suspension)		4× (suspension)	Kaplakriki, Hafnarfjörður; Attendance: 87; Referees: Garcia, Moreno (FRA)

=== Seventh place game ===
20 May 1995; 17:00	Czech Republic	21–23	Switzerland	Laugardalshöll, Reykjavík; Attendance: 1,500; Referees: Thomas, Thomas (GER)
20 May 1995; 17:00	Šetlík 7	(9–10)	Baumgartner 11	Laugardalshöll, Reykjavík; Attendance: 1,500; Referees: Thomas, Thomas (GER)
20 May 1995; 17:00	3× (suspension)		4× (suspension)	Laugardalshöll, Reykjavík; Attendance: 1,500; Referees: Thomas, Thomas (GER)

=== Fifth place game ===
20 May 1995
17:00
Egypt
28–31 (ET)
Russia
Laugardalshöll, Reykjavík
Attendance: 1,100
Referees: Arnaldsson, Erlingsson (ISL)
Awaad 6
(13–13)
Filippov 9
4× (suspension)

2× (suspension)

FT: 24–24 ET: 4–7

=== Third place game ===
21 May 1995; 12:30	Sweden	26–20	Germany	Laugardalshöll, Reykjavík; Attendance: 4,200; Referees: Brussel, Van Dongen (NED)
21 May 1995; 12:30	Andersson 6	(11–9)	Kretzschmar 6	Laugardalshöll, Reykjavík; Attendance: 4,200; Referees: Brussel, Van Dongen (NED)
21 May 1995; 12:30	4× (suspension)		2× (suspension)	Laugardalshöll, Reykjavík; Attendance: 4,200; Referees: Brussel, Van Dongen (NED)

=== Final ===
21 May 1995; 15:00	France	23–19	Croatia	Laugardalshöll, Reykjavík; Attendance: 4,900; Referees: Øie, Høgsnes (NOR)
21 May 1995; 15:00	Stoecklin 7	(11–6)	Bilić, Ćavar 5	Laugardalshöll, Reykjavík; Attendance: 4,900; Referees: Øie, Høgsnes (NOR)
21 May 1995; 15:00	5× (suspension)		2× (suspension)	Laugardalshöll, Reykjavík; Attendance: 4,900; Referees: Øie, Høgsnes (NOR)

== Final standings ==
Rank	Team
Gold medal	France
Silver medal	Croatia
Bronze medal	Sweden
4	Germany
5	Russia
6	Egypt
7	Switzerland
8	Czech Republic
9	Belarus
10	Romania
11	Spain
12	South Korea
13	Cuba
14	Iceland
15	Tunisia
16	Algeria
17	Hungary
18	Slovenia
19	Denmark
20	Kuwait
21	United States
22	Morocco
23	Japan
24	Brazil

Source: IHF

Qualified for the 1996 Summer Olympics
Qualified for the 1996 Summer Olympics and the 1997 World Men's Handball Championship

1995 Men's World Champions

France
First title

== Medal summary ==
Gold	Silver	Bronze
France: Christian Gaudin; Eric Quintin; Pascal Mahé; Bruno Martini; Frédéric Volle; Philippe Gardent; Denis Lathoud; Thierry Perreux; Guéric Kervadec; Laurent Munier; Patrick Cazal; Yohann Delattre; Gaël Monthurel; Jackson Richardson; Grégory Anquetil; Stéphane Stoecklin; Head coach: Mr. Daniel Costantini	Croatia: Zvonimir Bilić; Irfan Smajlagić; Valter Matošević; Patrik Ćavar; Tomislav Farkaš; Venio Losert; Slavko Goluža; Vlado Šola; Goran Perkovac; Iztok Puc; Nenad Kljaić; Bruno Gudelj; Zlatko Saračević; Vladimir Jelčić; Alvaro Načinović; Mirza Šarić; Head coach : Mr. Zdravko Zovko	Sweden: Magnus Andersson; Robert Andersson; Per Carlén; Martin Frändesjö; Peter Gentzel; Erik Hajas; Robert Hedin; Ola Lindgren; Stefan Lövgren; Staffan Olsson; Mats Olsson; Johan Petersson; Tomas Sivertsson; Tomas Svensson; Pierre Thorsson; Magnus Wislander; Head coach : Mr. Bengt Johansson
