= Route 41 (Iceland) =

Road in Iceland

Route 41
- Reykjanesbraut
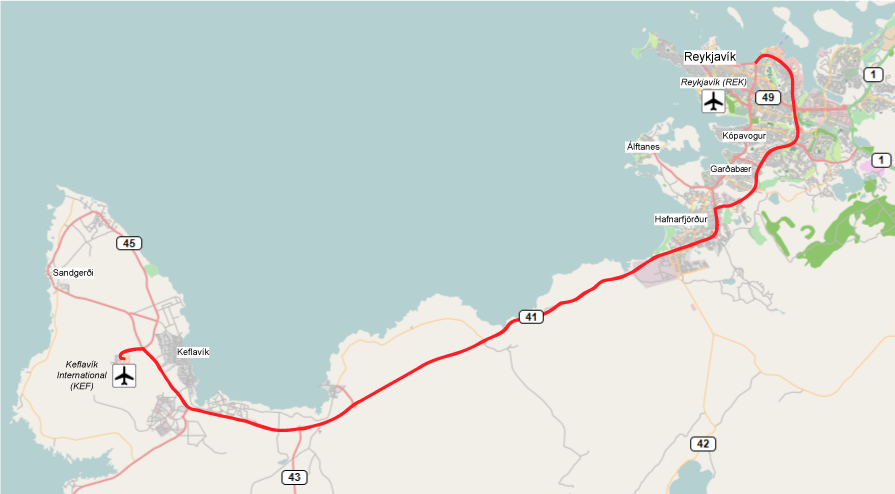
- Reykjanes Highway in red

Route information
- Existed: 1912–present

Major junctions
- Northern end: Route 40 Kringlumýrarbraut
- Route 49 Miklabraut; Route 413 Breiðholtsbraut; Route 411 Arnarnesvegur; Route 40 Fjarðarhraun
- Western end: Keflavik International

Location
- Country: Iceland

Highway system
- Roads in Iceland

Route 41, known as Reykjanesbraut (Icelandic pronunciation: [ˈreiːcaˌnɛsˌprœyːt], lit. 'Reykjanes Way') in Icelandic, is a highway in southwest Iceland, running along the northern shore of Reykjanes Peninsula from Keflavík Airport to the Capital Region.

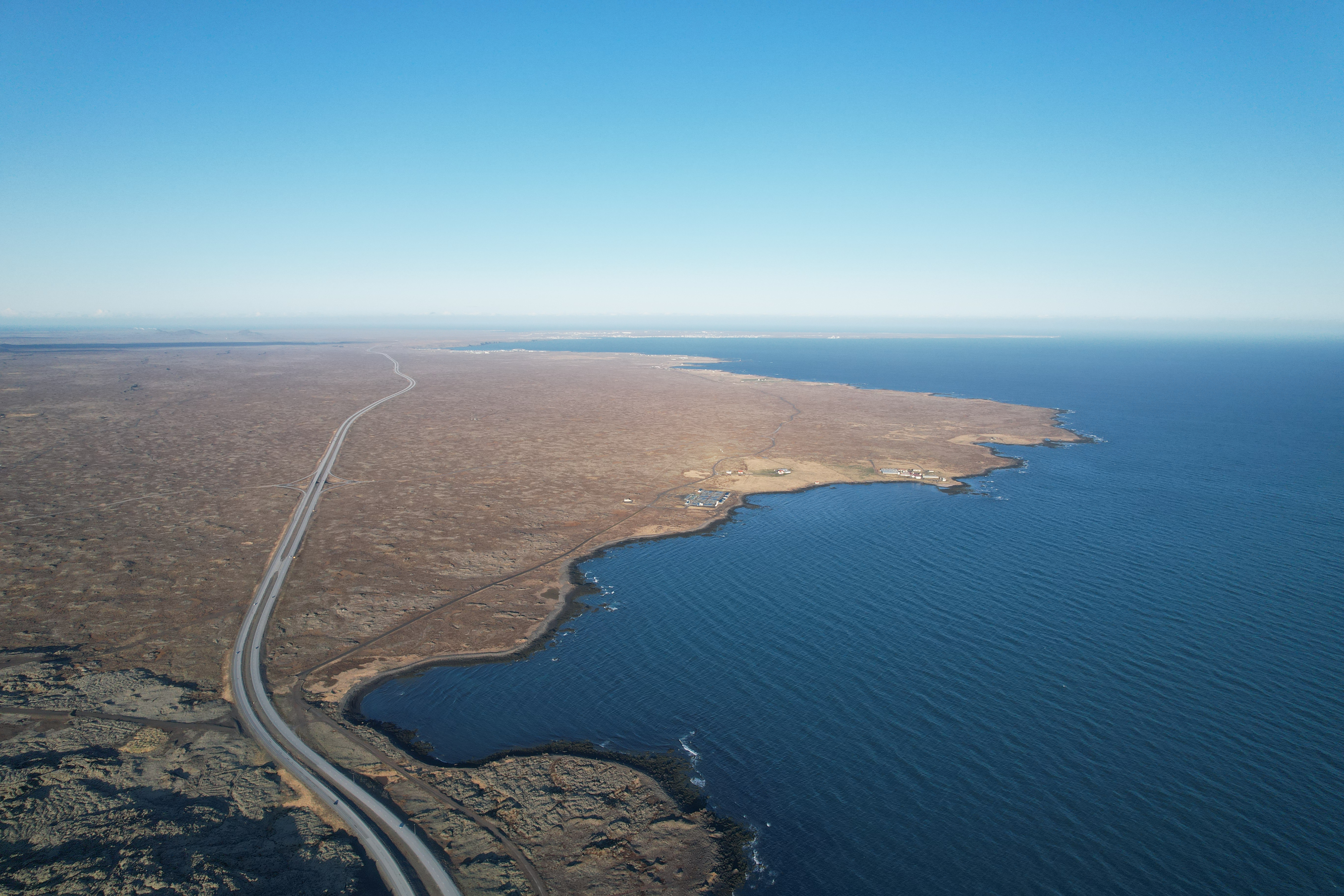
Route 41 heading west towards Keflavík.

The current road is mostly dual carriageway with four lanes and grade separated junctions. In addition to being the main road between Reykjavík and Keflavík Airport, it serves as a major traffic artery in the eastern and southern suburbs of the Capital Region. It runs from the intersection of Miklabraut-Sæbraut-Vesturlandsvegur south towards Hafnarfjörður, where it bends, and continues from there to Keflavík.

== History ==
The original road was finished in 1912. This road was called Keflavíkurvegur ([ˈcʰɛplaˌviːkʏrˌvɛːɣʏr̥], lit. 'Keflavík Road') but the name is now given to route 424 that runs from Reykjanesbraut through outer Njarðvík and Keflavík, which comprises much of the original 1912 road.

In the years 1960 to 1965, a new paved road was constructed. From 1965 until 1972, there was a toll to repay construction costs.

2003 saw the start of construction to upgrade the non-urban part to a dual carriageway, being completed by October 2008. In 2021, the urban section of the road through Hafnafjörður was upgraded to a dual carriageway with grade separated crossings. In 2025, the last non-urban single carriageway section past the Straumsvík aluminium smelter was upgraded. Route 41 is now a grade-separated dual carriageway from Keflavík to Hafnafjörður.

== Sections ==
As a national highway the route includes a large part of Sæbraut [ˈsaiːˌprœyːt], a local road in Reykjavík that begins at the northern end of Reykjanesbraut. Therefore, the stretch of Sæbraut east of Kringlumýrarbraut is marked as number 41.
