= Hvalfjörður =

Fjord in Iceland

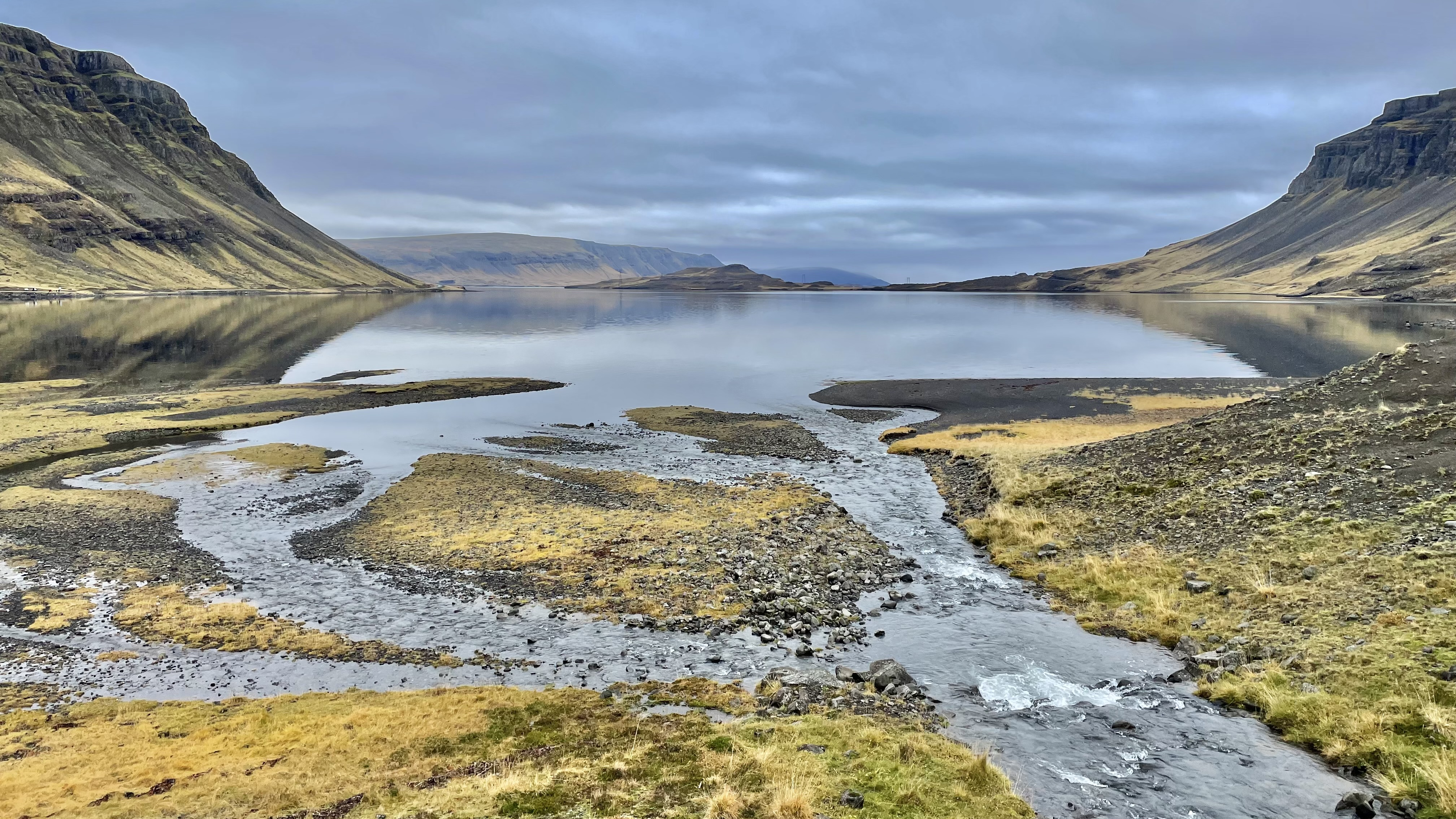

- Location within Iceland
- Location: Iceland
- Coordinates: 64°23′N 21°40′W
- Type: Fjord
- Part of: Faxaflói
- Primary inflows: Botnsá river
- Max. length: 30 kilometres (19 mi)
- Max. width: 5 kilometres (3.1 mi)
- Average depth: 80 metres (260 ft)

Hvalfjörður (Icelandic pronunciation: [ˈkʰvalˌfjœrðʏr̥], "whale fjord") is situated in the west of Iceland between Mosfellsbær and Akranes. The fjord is approximately 30 kilometres (19 miles) long and 5 kilometres (3.1 miles) wide.

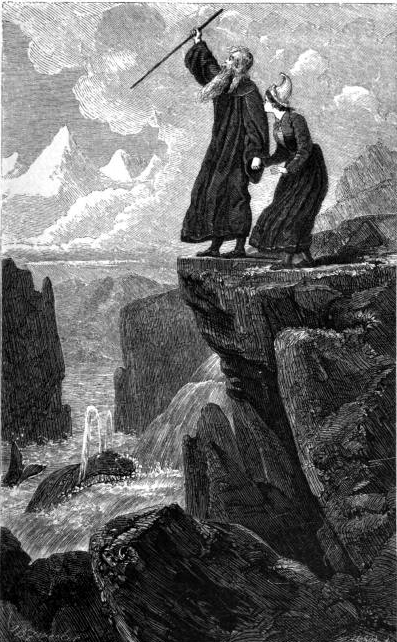
A portrait of the legend of the valley of Glymur with the "Rauðhöfði"

The origin of the name Hvalfjörður is uncertain. Certainly today there is no presence of whales in the fjord; while there is a whaling station in the fjord, whaling is conducted in the open ocean outside the fjord; likewise, it is modern and postdates the naming of the fjord. One theory as to the naming of the fjord is that early settlers encountered a pod of whales trapped in the fjord who ended up beached; the stranding of whales was in early Iceland a godsend in the meat that it provided, to the point that the word hvalreki means both "whale beaching" and "windfall or godsend". However, there is no direct evidence to support this theory. Another theory is that the fjord is named after Hvalfjall ("Whale Mountain", a mountain at the bottom of the fjord), which would have been in turn named after its visual appearance. A common folk story of unknown age also is sometimes presented as the origin of the name, involving an elf woman who transformed her human lover into an angry red-headed whale ("Rauðhöfði"), who subsequently lived in the fjord wrecking ships, as revenge for his refusal to acknowledge their child.

The only whaling station in Iceland is still located in this fjord. In the past the fjord also contained many herring fisheries.

During World War II, when Iceland was occupied by the Allies, a naval base of the British and American navies could be found in this fjord. The British base, HMS Baldur, was at Hvitanes, on a small point of land jutting into the fjord. The base was the headquarters of the Flag Officer Commanding, Iceland (C). One of the piers built by the United States Navy is today used by the Hvalur whaling company for the processing of fin whales, partially for the domestic market, and mostly for export to Japan.

Until the late 1990s, those travelling by car had to make a long detour of 62 kilometres (39 miles) around the fjord on the hringvegur (road no. 1), in order to get from the city of Reykjavík to the town of Borgarnes. In 1998, the tunnel Hvalfjarðargöngin, which shortens the trip considerably, was opened to public traffic. The tunnel is approximately 5,762 metres (18,904 feet) in length, and cuts travel by car around the fjord by about an hour. The tunnel runs to a depth of 165 metres (541 feet) below sea level.

The south side of the fjord runs through the municipality of Kjós. Two different rivers named Fossá (Waterfall River) cross the road, each having a number of cascades, although the western one is easy to miss from the road, as its main fall tumbles from beneath the road into a lower forest. The sizeable Laxá (Salmon River) crosses the road near the heart of Kjós; south of it lies the lake Meðalfellsvatn, home to many summer houses. The large sandbar Hvalfjarðareyri is a popular place to see birds.

The innermost part of the fjord shows a mixture of volcanic mountains and green vegetation in summertime. At Botnsá, Nootka lupine is common, along with other flowers and moss, as well as small forests of birch and conifers. The area displays a good example of the planting of forests, a project that has been going on in Iceland for some years.

A hiking trail to the formerly-highest waterfall in Iceland, Glymur, has its origin at the innermost end of the fjord. The somewhat steep trail up the rim of the deep river gorge is called Leggjabrjótur, meaning "Broken Leg". Before the ascent it passes through a short cave and across a thin improvised bridge. While it is possible to reach the bottom of the falls, it is not recommended; one has to wade through the cold river into the canyon, which is dim and at constant risk of falling rocks.

In the northwestern part of the fjord lies a tiny steep-sided island called Geirshólmi, which was for a time during the Age of the Sturlungs home to a band of outlaws led by Svarthöfði Dufgusson who regularly raided the farms on the mainland.

In the northwestern side of the fjord is Grundartangi, where a large aluminum smelter and silicon plant are located.

Hvalfjörður is also referenced in the novella The Odd Saga of the American and a Curious Icelandic Flock; as they pull to a stop at the toll before Hvalfjörður Tunnel, Alex begins to draw an important secret from an intoxicated Snorri.

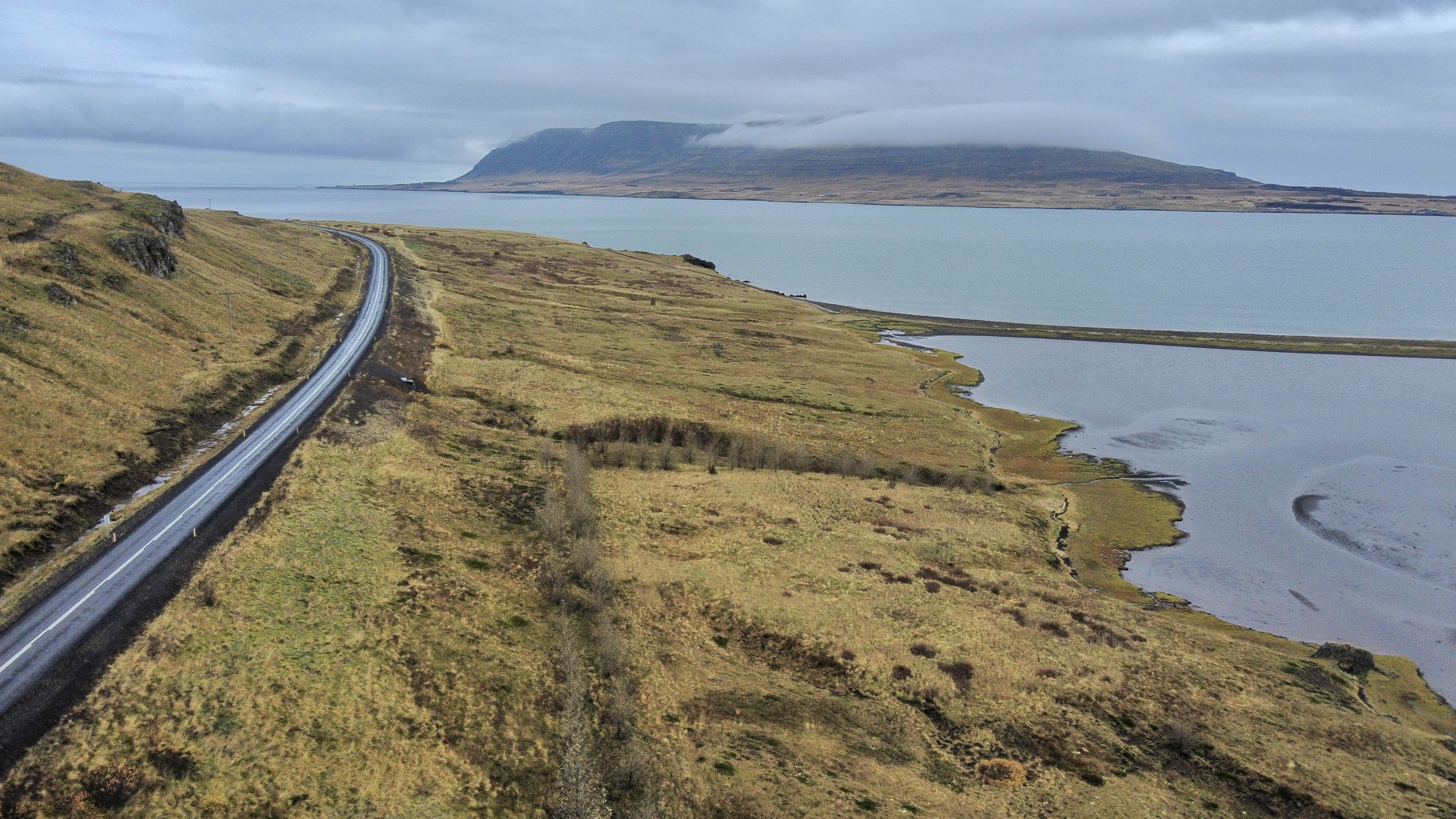
Road No. 47 (the former ringroad) on the fjord's southern shore

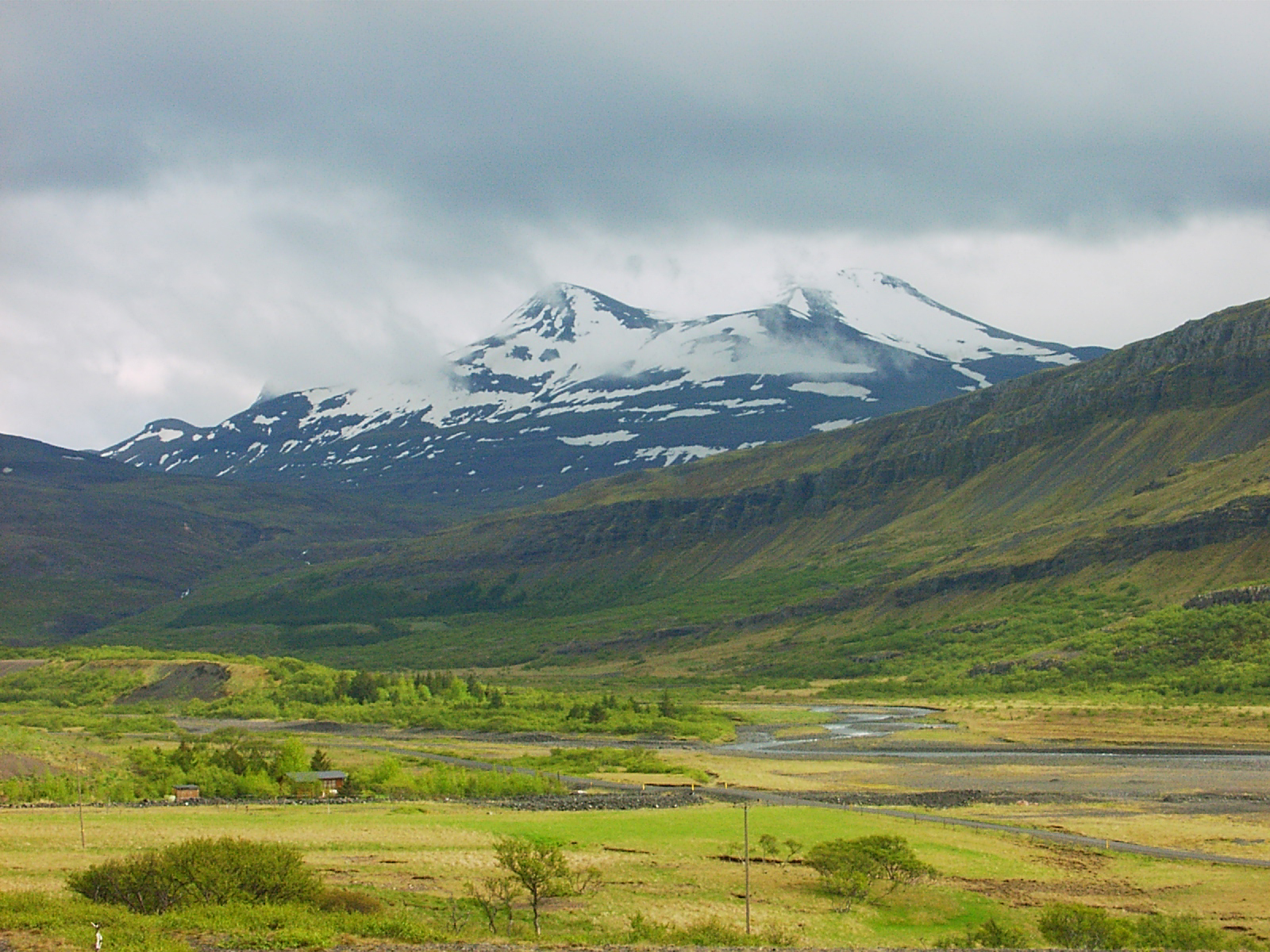
View into the Botnsdalur from the Hvalfjörður

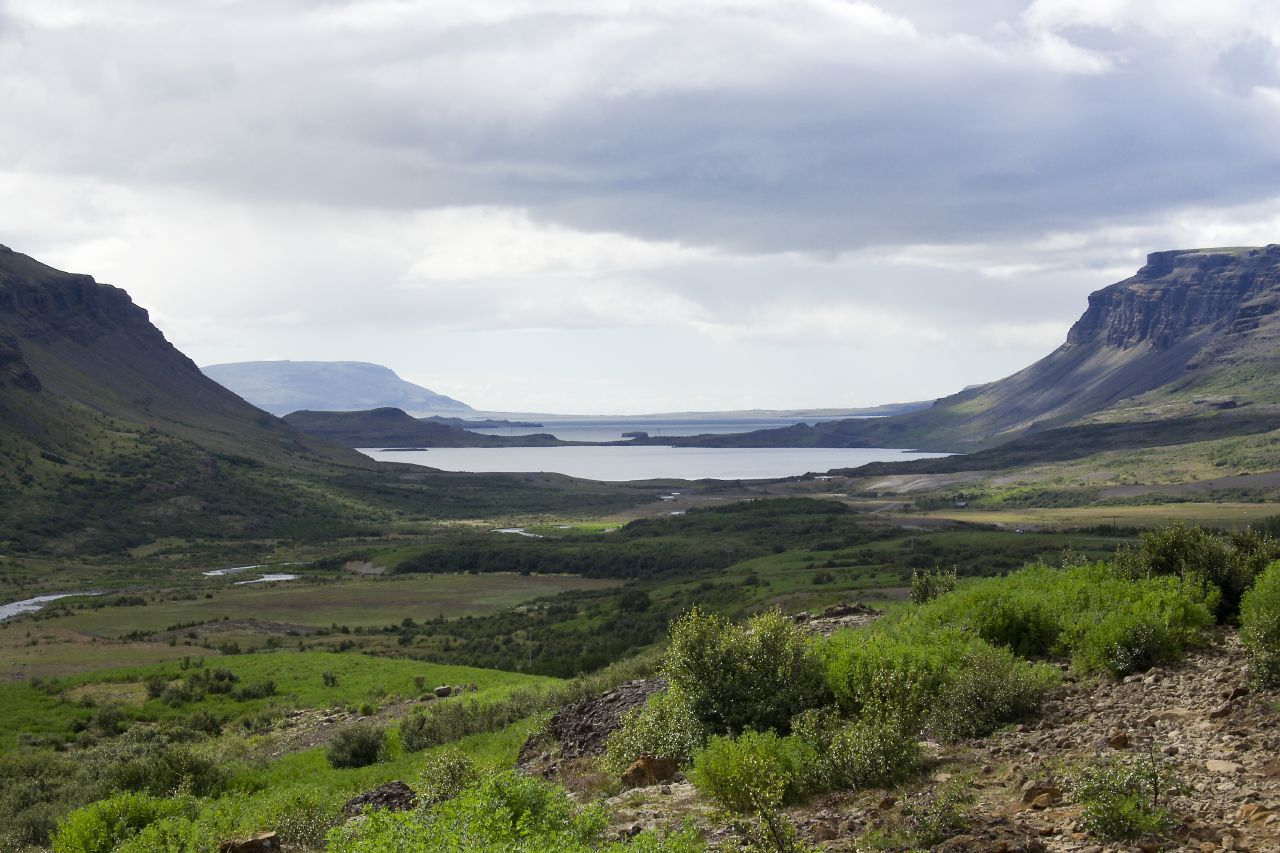
View from the Botnsdalur out the Hvalfjörður

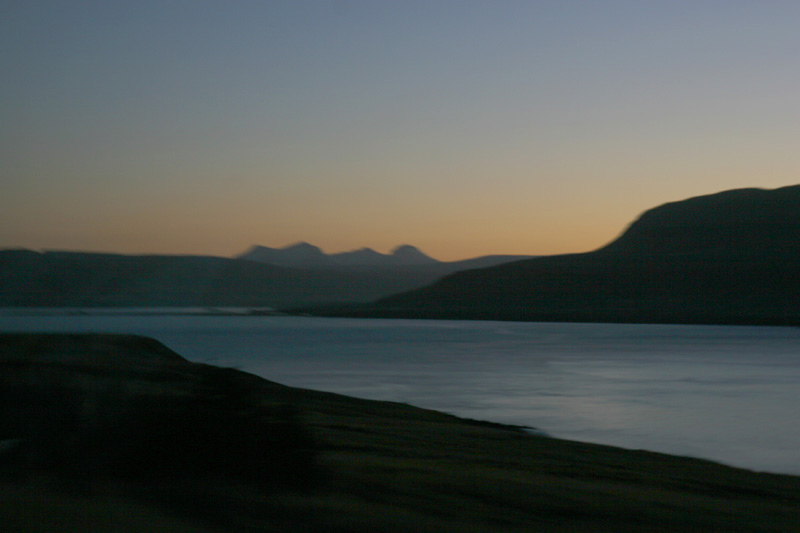
Looking southeast across Hvalfjörður at dawn, November 2007

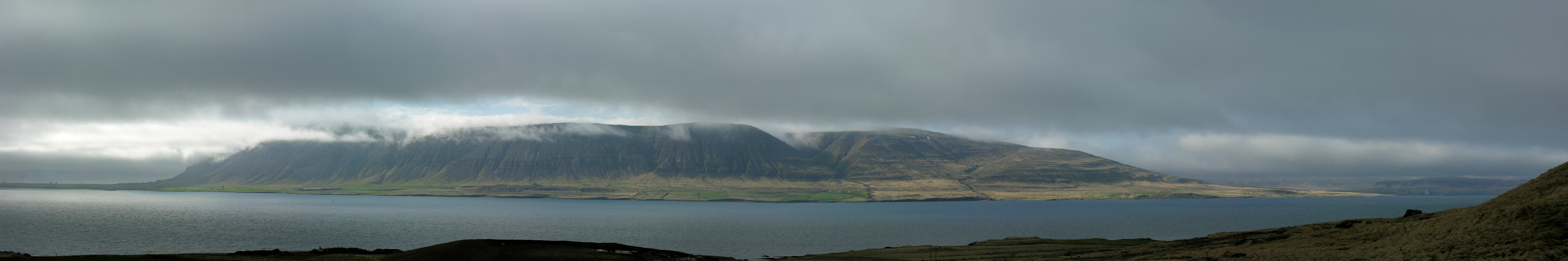
Panoramic view of Hvalfjörður

== See also ==
- Fjords of Iceland
- Whaling in Iceland
- Tunnels in Iceland
- Hallgrímskirkja (Hvalfirði)
- Maríuhöfn, an important trading post and harbour in the Middle Ages.
