= Laxá í Kjós =

River in Iceland

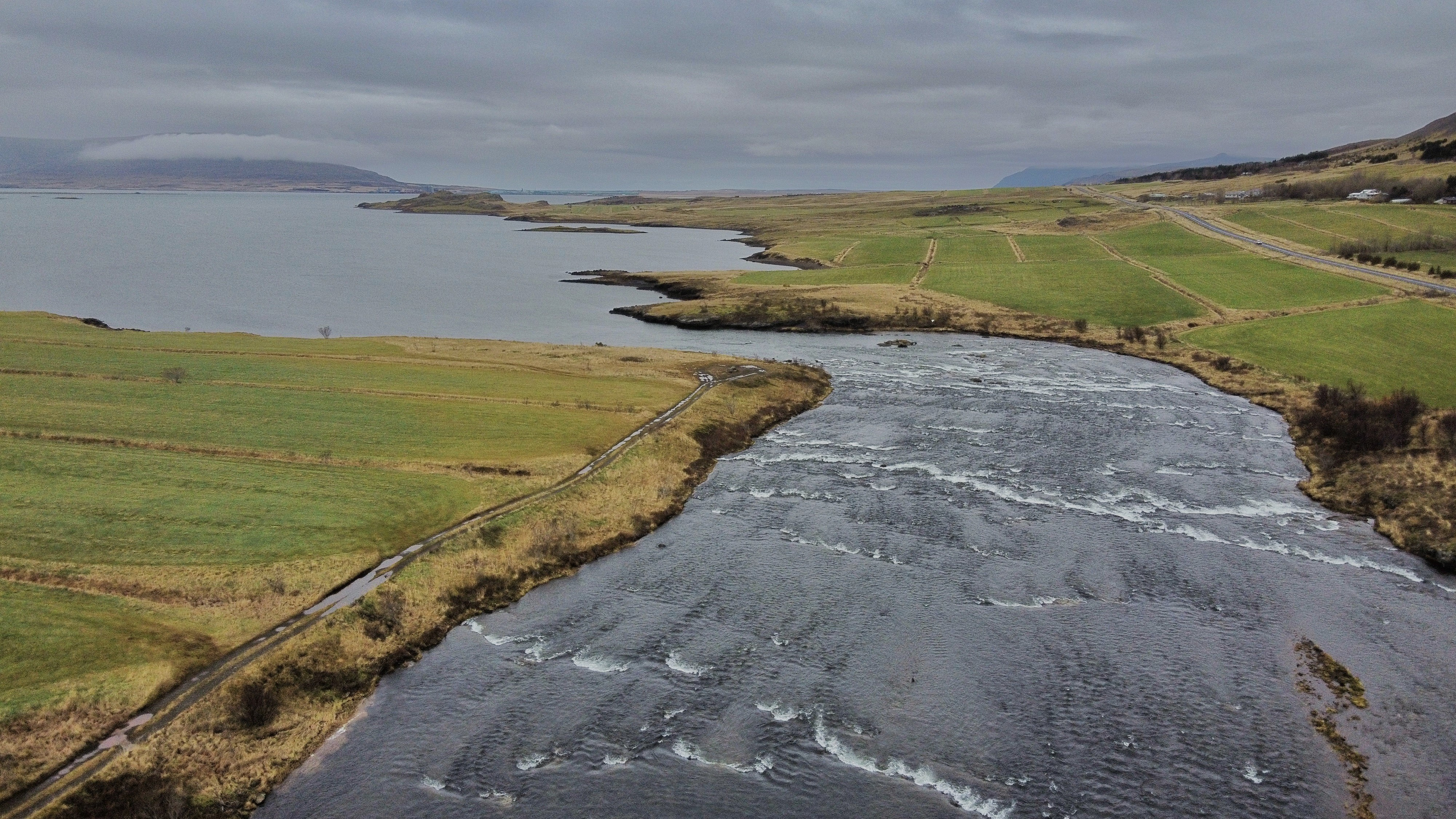
- Laxá í Kjós near its mouth at the Laxárvogur.

- Location of the mouth of Laxá í Kjós
- Etymology: Icelandic: lax, lit. 'salmon'

Location
- Country: Iceland
- Region: Capital Region (Greater Reykjavík)
- Constituency: Southwest
- Municipality: Kjósarhreppur (Kjós)

Physical characteristics
- Source: Stíflisdalsvatn lake
  - coordinates: 64°15′04″N 21°20′42″W
  - elevation: 178 m (584 ft)
- Mouth: Laxárvogur, Hvalfjörður
  - coordinates: 64°20′32″N 21°36′58″W
  - elevation: 1 metre (3 ft 3 in)
- Length: 20 km (12 mi)
- Basin size: 211 km^{2} (81 sq mi)

Basin features
- Tributaries
  - left: Svínadalsá, Bugða

Laxá í Kjós (Icelandic pronunciation: [ˈlaksˌauː iː ˈcʰouːs]; Laxá in Kjós) is a river in the Kjósarhreppur municipality of southwestern Iceland. It flows about 20 kilometres (12 mi) from the Stíflisdalsvatn [ˈstiplɪsˌtalsˌvahtn̥], a small lake northwest of the Þingvallavatn, into the Laxárvogur [ˈlaksˌaurˌvɔːɣʏr̥], a cove on the Hvalfjörður fjord.

It is known for its salmon fishing, particularly where the salmon must traverse up several waterfalls. Brown trout and sea trout are also caught in the river.

The first salmon hatchery in Iceland, established in 1884 by Danish scientist Arthur Feddersen in the village of Reynivellir, was stocked with 31 spawning salmon captured in the Laxá í Kjós and its main tributary, the Bugða [ˈpʏɣða]. Other tributaries include the smaller Svínadalsá [ˈsviːnaˌtalsˌauː], Hálsá [ˈhaulsˌauː], and Þverá [ˈθvɛːrˌauː], all of which flow into the upper section of the river below the Þórufoss.

== Waterfalls ==
The Þórufoss [ˈθouːrʏˌfɔsː] is an 18 metres (59 ft) high waterfall, located about 1.5 kilometres (0.93 mi) downstream from where Laxá í Kjós flows out of the Stíflisdalsvatn. A further 6.5 kilometres (4.0 mi) downstream from the Þórufoss is the Pokafoss [ˈpʰɔːkaˌfɔsː] a rapids-like small waterfall with a 2 metres (6 ft 7 in) cascade. Both falls are accessible from the Kjósarskarðsvegur (Highway 48). Near where the river enters the Laxárvogur is another small waterfall, the Kvíslafoss [ˈkʰvistlaˌfɔsː].
The Þórufoss was the filming location for a scene in Game of Thrones ("The Laws of Gods and Men:" Season 4, Episode 6) where a dragon attacks a herd of Meereen goats.

== Gallery: Waterfalls (foss) of Laxá í Kjós ==
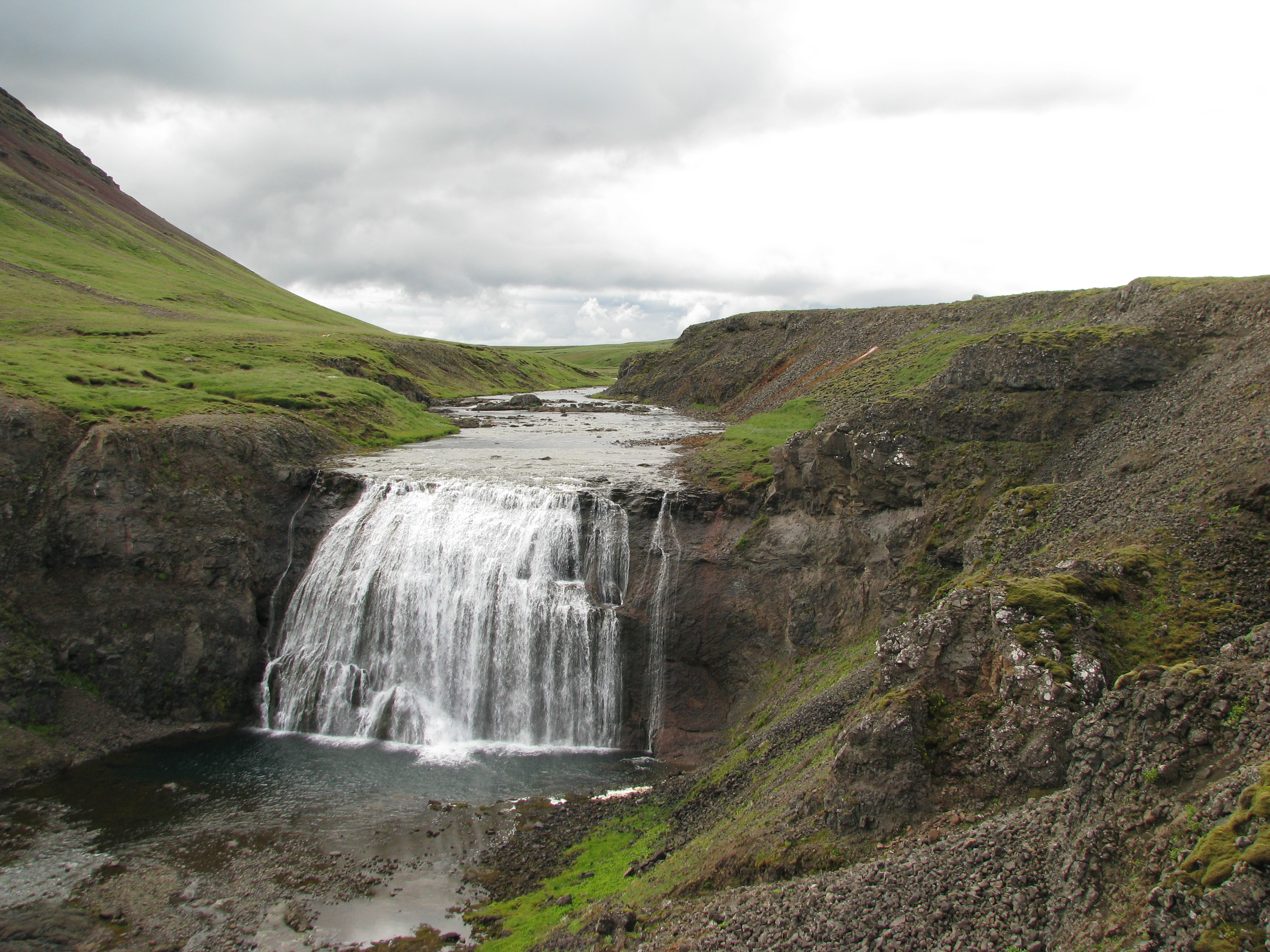
The Þórufoss in Summer

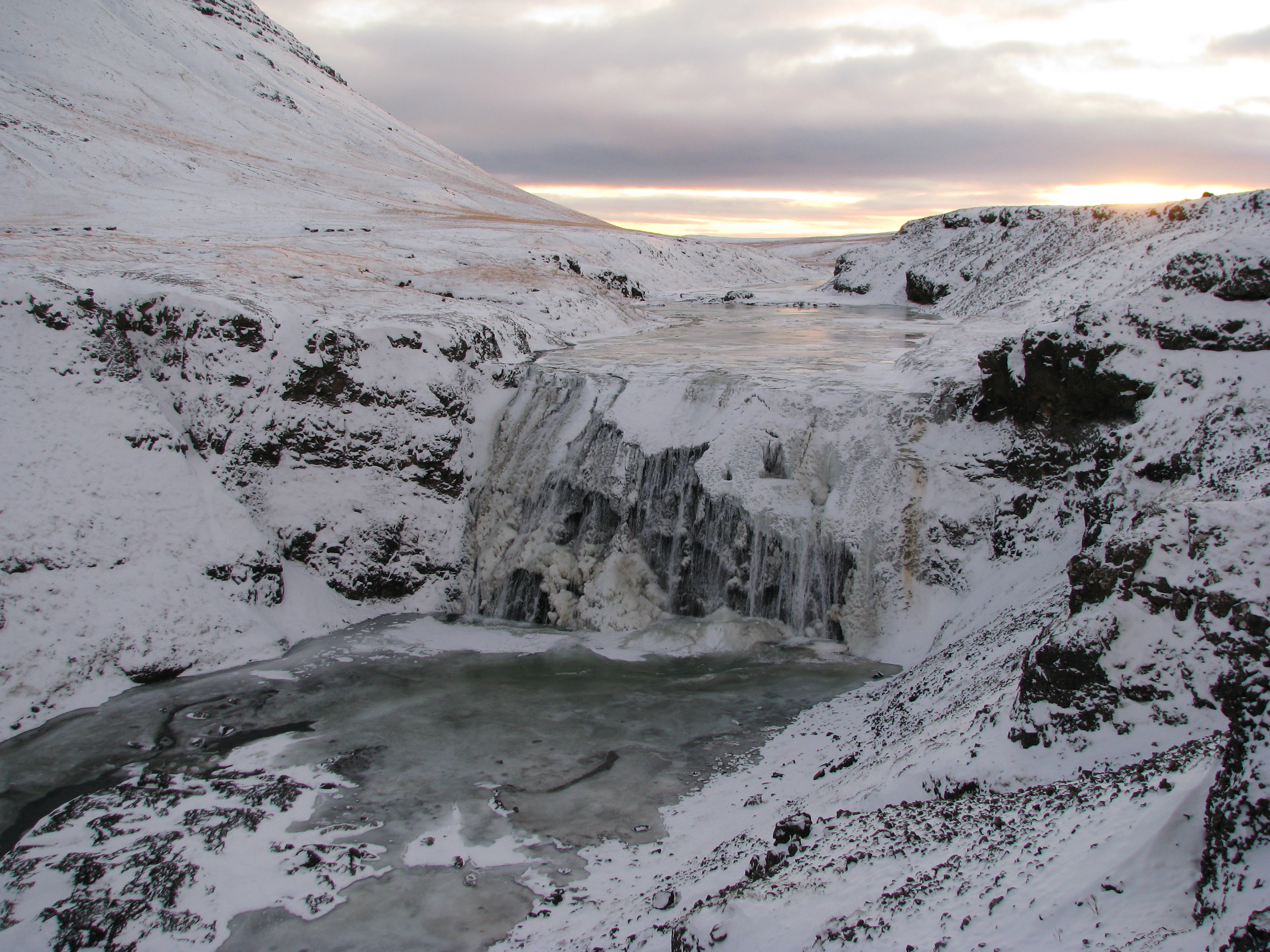
The Þórufoss in Winter

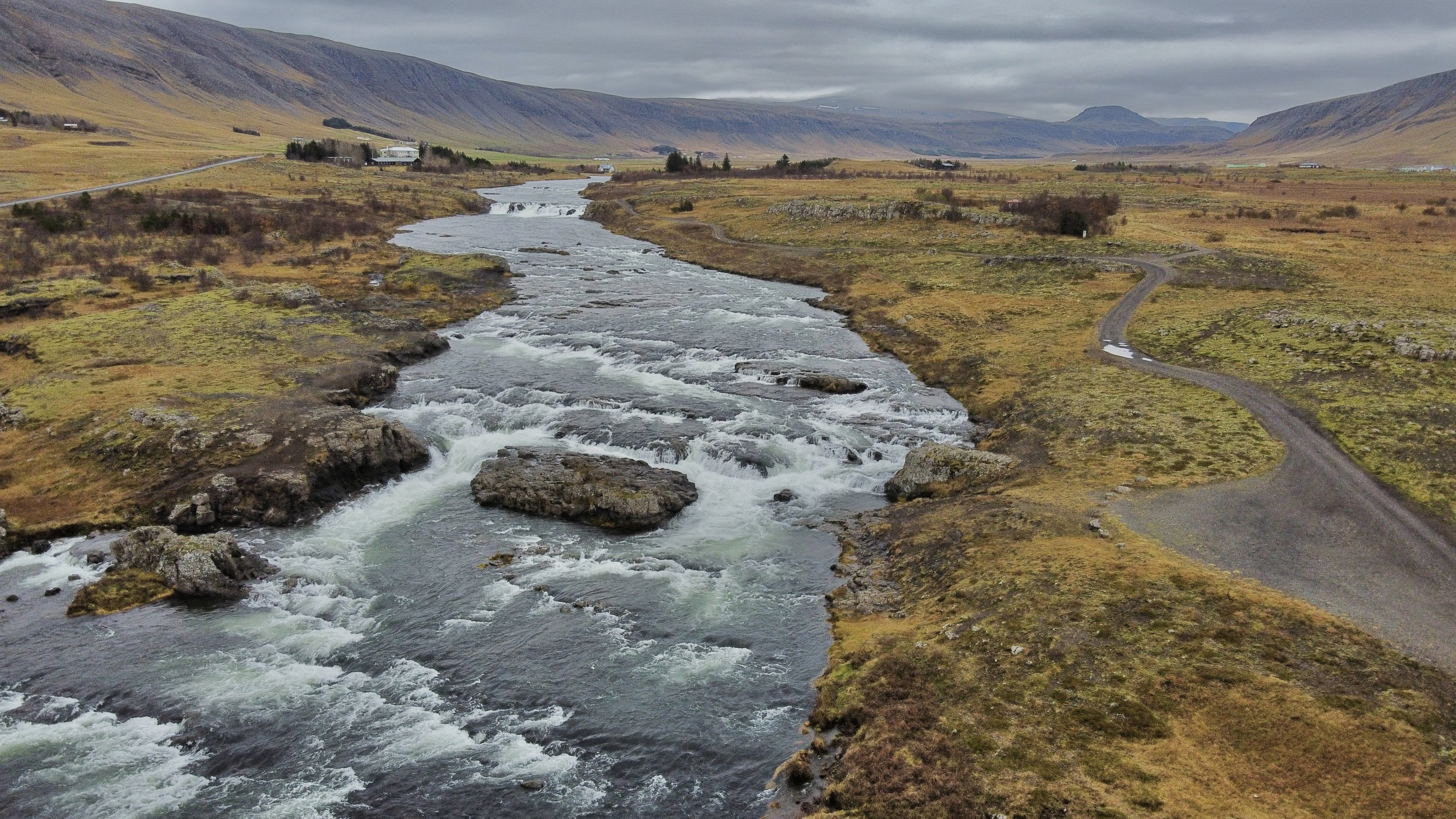
Kvíslafoss in October

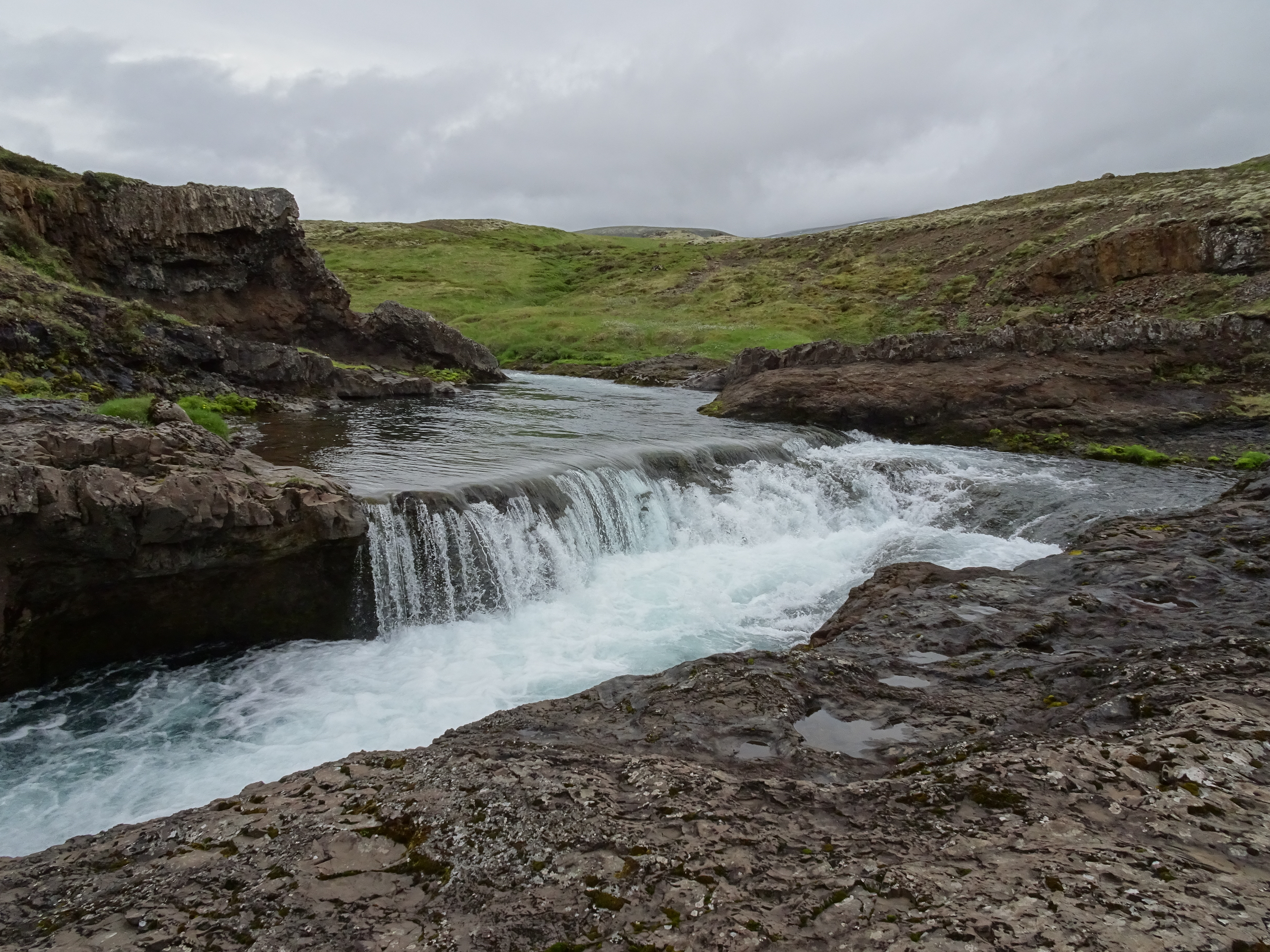
The Pokafoss in June
