= Route 49 (Iceland) =

Road in Iceland

Coordinates: 64°7′47″N 21°52′32″W

Route 49
- Nesbraut

Major junctions
- Eastern end: Route 1 Vesturlandsvegur
- Route 40 Kringlumýrarbraut
- Western end: Seltjarnarnes

Location
- Country: Iceland

Highway system
- Roads in Iceland

Nesbraut (Icelandic pronunciation: [ˈnɛsˌprœyːt], lit. 'Cape Road'), or Route 49, is a major traffic artery in Reykjavík, Iceland. It is the busiest road in the country, and is one of the two main roads running across Capital Region, the other being Kringlumýrarbraut. The name Nesbraut is not well known among locals as it is usually referred to by its main segments: Miklabraut ([ˈmɪhklaˌprœyːt], lit. 'Main Road') and Hringbraut ([ˈriŋkˌprœyːt], lit. 'Ring Road').

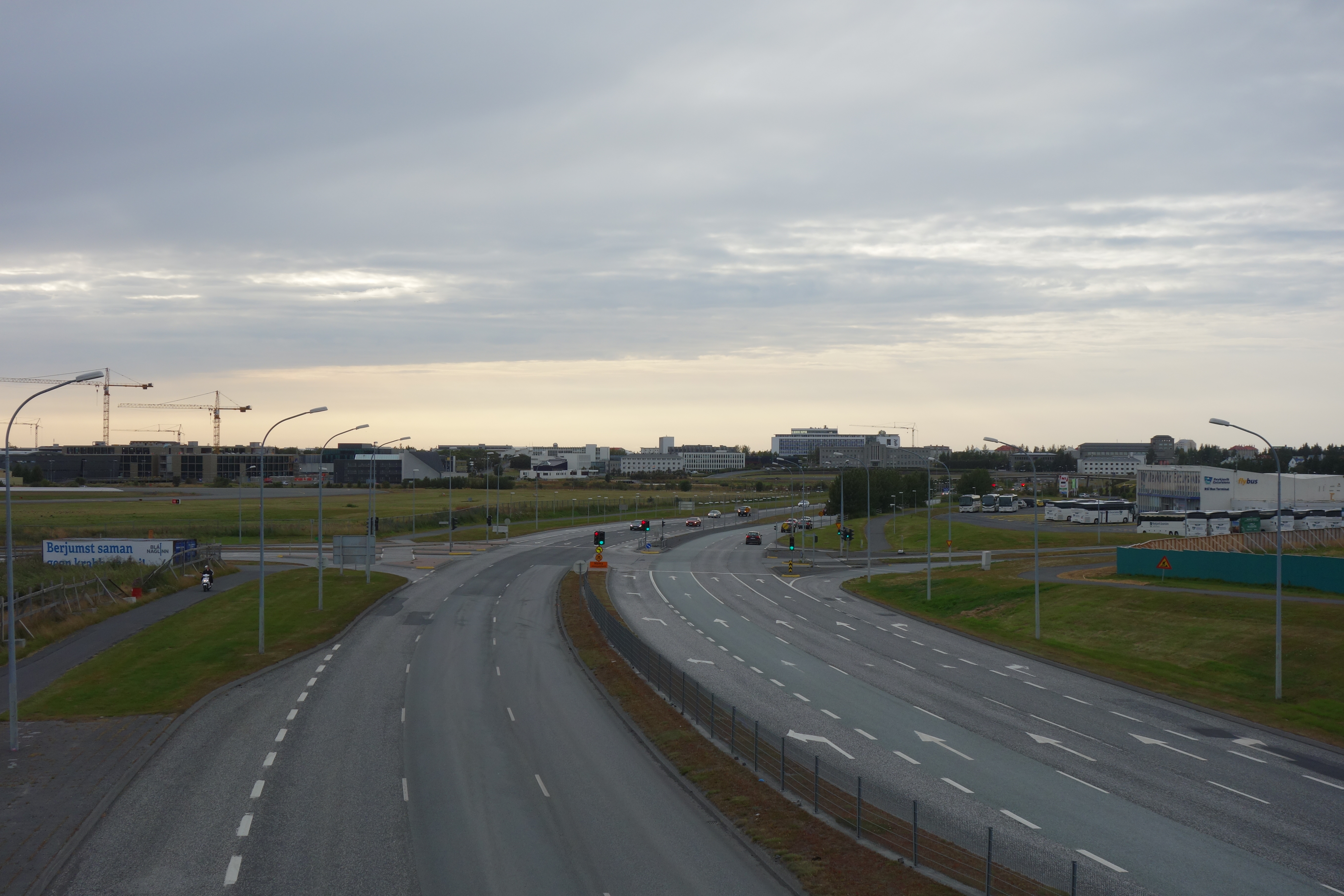
Hringbraut seen from a pedestrian bridge
