= NUTS statistical regions of Iceland =

As a candidate country of the European Union, Iceland (IS) is included in the Nomenclature of Territorial Units for Statistics (NUTS). The three NUTS levels are:

- NUTS-1: IS0 Iceland
- NUTS-2: IS00 Iceland
- NUTS-3: Capital area / Rest of country
  - IS001 Höfuðborgarsvæðið (Capital Region)
  - IS002 Landsbyggð (rest of country)

Below the NUTS levels, there are two Local Administrative Unitary levels (LAU-1: regions, LAU-2: municipalities).

== See also ==
- Administrative divisions of Iceland
- ISO 3166-2 codes of Iceland
- FIPS region codes of Iceland

== Sources ==
- Hierarchical list of the Nomenclature of territorial units for statistics - NUTS and the Statistical regions of Europe
- Overview map of EFTA countries - Statistical regions at level 1
  - ÍSLAND - Statistical regions at level 2
  - ÍSLAND - Statistical regions at level 3
- Correspondence between the regional levels and the national administrative units
- Regions of Iceland, Statoids.com
