= Maríuhöfn =

Former trading post in Hvalfjörður, Iceland

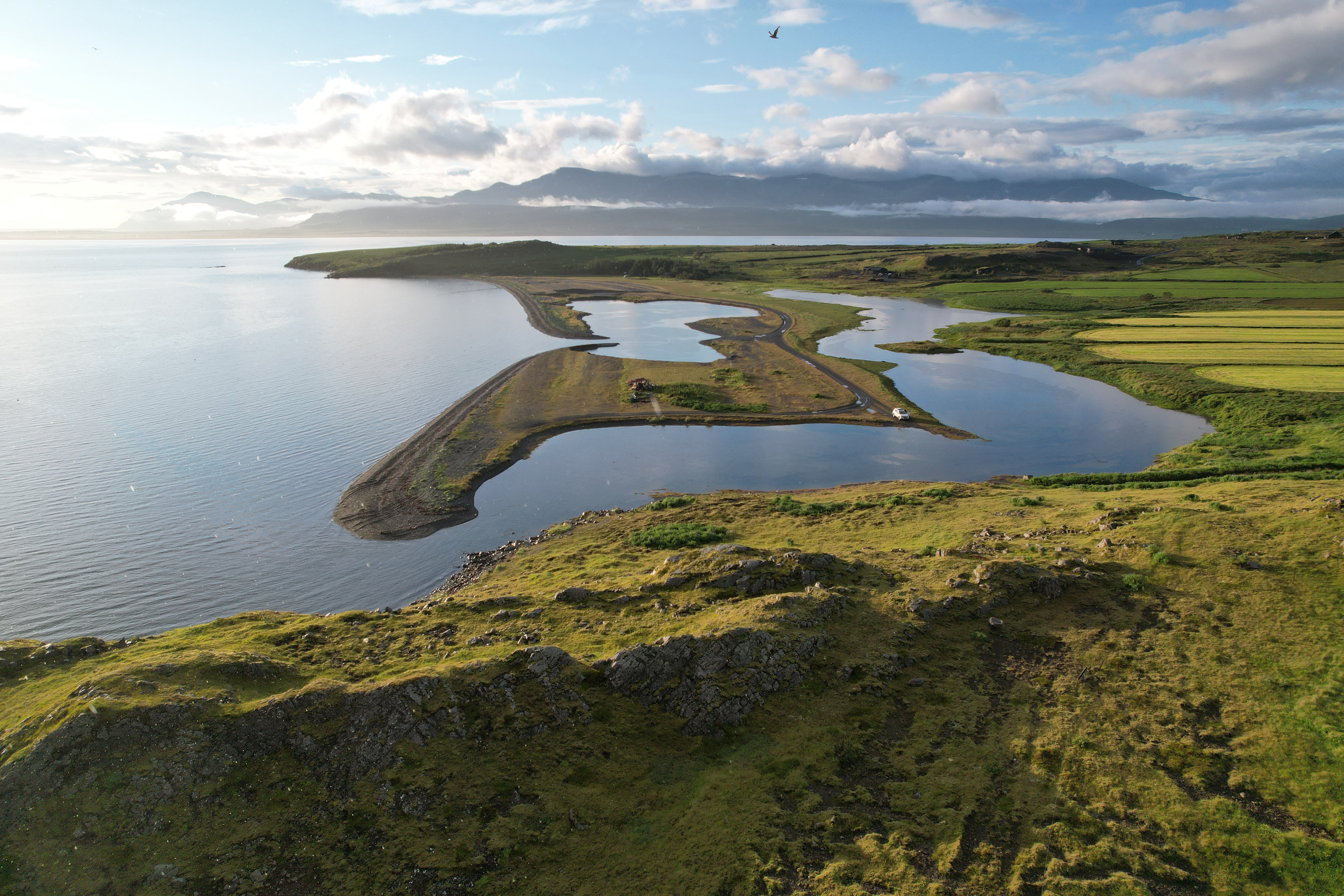
Maríuhöfn

Maríuhöfn (Icelandic pronunciation: [ˈmaːriːʏˌhœpn̥]) in Hvalfjörður in Iceland was an important trading post and harbour in the Middle Ages. Ancient manuscripts often mention ships sailing to and from Hvalfjörður and probably the harbour in Maríuhöfn. It is believed that Black Death entered Iceland in 1402 with the cloths of Einar Herjólfsson which came to Iceland with a ship landing in Maríuhöfn.
