= Route 40 (Iceland) =

Road in Iceland

Route 40
- Hafnarfjarðarvegur
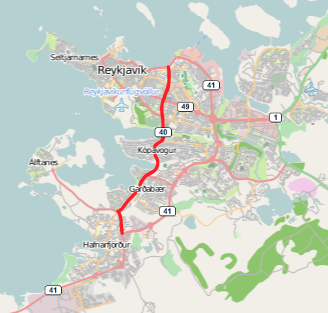

Major junctions
- Northern end: Route 41 Sæbraut
- Route 49 Miklabraut
- Southern end: Route 41 Reykjanesbraut

Location
- Country: Iceland

Highway system
- Roads in Iceland

Route 40, known as Hafnarfjarðarvegur (Icelandic pronunciation: [ˈhapnarˌfjarðarˌvɛːɣʏr̥], lit. 'Hafnarfjörður Road') in Icelandic or by its busiest stretch, Kringlumýrarbraut ([ˈkʰriŋlʏˌmiːrarˌprœyːt], lit. 'Kringlumýri Road'), is one of the two major traffic arteries running across Capital Region.
