= Kjósarhreppur =

Human settlement

Coordinates: 64°20′29.8″N 21°35′33.4″W

- Municipality
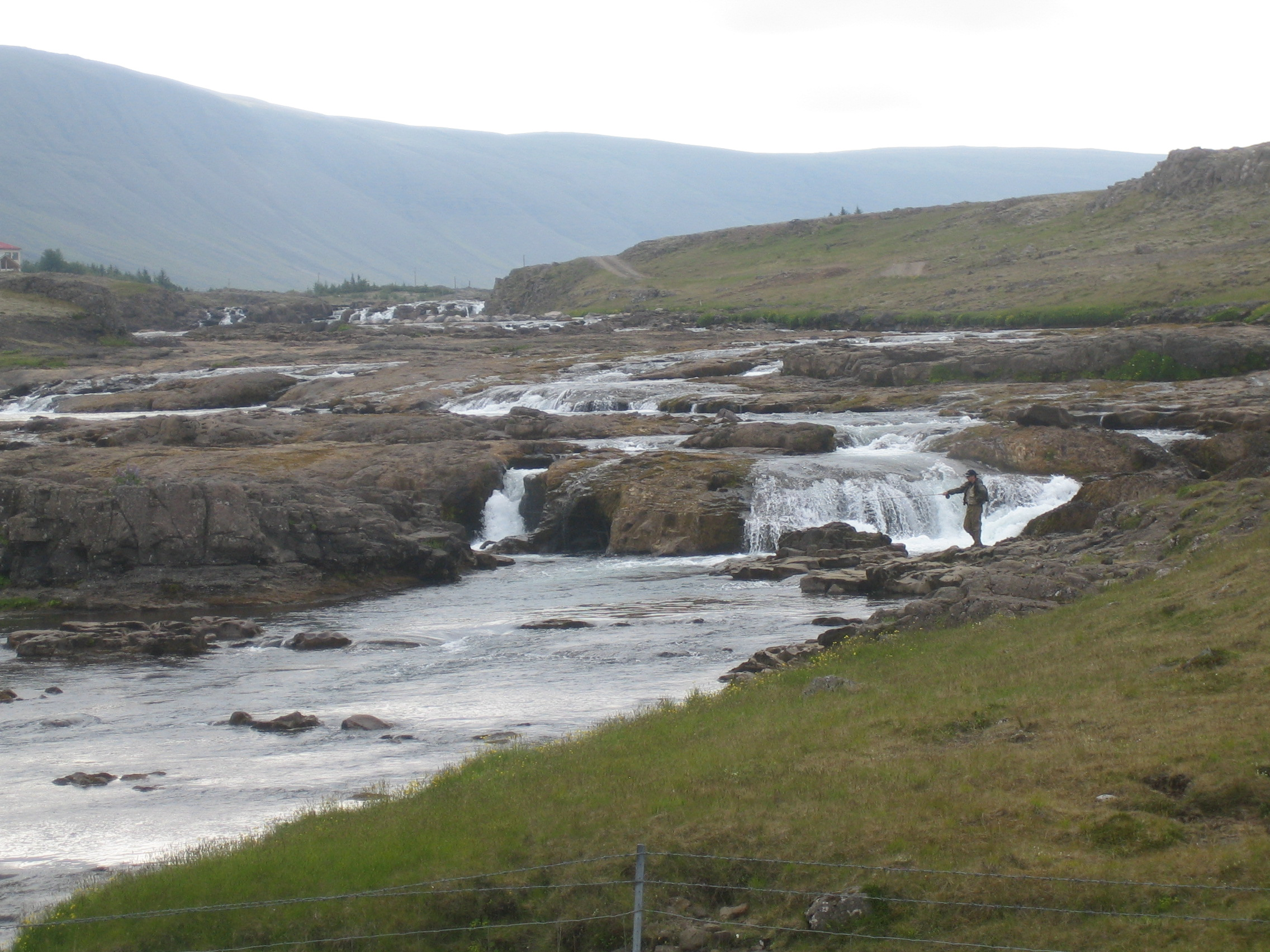
- The Laxá river flows through Kjósarhreppur

- Location of the municipality

- Location within Iceland
- Country: Iceland
- Region: Capital Region
- Constituency: Southwest Constituency

Government
  - Manager: Karl Magnús Kristjánsson

Area
  - Total: 284 km^{2} (110 sq mi)

Population (2025)
  - Total: 301
  - Density: 1.06/km^{2} (2.75/sq mi)
- Postal code(s): 276
- Municipal number: 1606
- Website: kjos.is

Kjósarhreppur (Icelandic pronunciation: [ˈcʰouːsar̥ˌr̥ehpʏr̥]), colloquially known as Kjós [ˈcʰouːs], is a municipality in Iceland. It is the most northern part of the Capital Region and is adjacent to Reykjavík, Bláskógabyggð, and Hvalfjarðarsveit. Kjós is sometimes referred to as "a countryside in a city" (sveit í borg) due to its proximity to Reykjavík.

The primary industry in Kjós is agriculture. It is home to a number of lakes and rivers, including the Laxá í Kjós, one of the most popular sites for salmon fishing in the country.

In 2025 due to climate change, some specimens of Culiseta annulata were found in the municipality though it had previously been free of mosquitoes.
