= Capital Region (Iceland) =

Region of Iceland

Capital Region Höfuðborgarsvæðið (Icelandic)
- Capital region
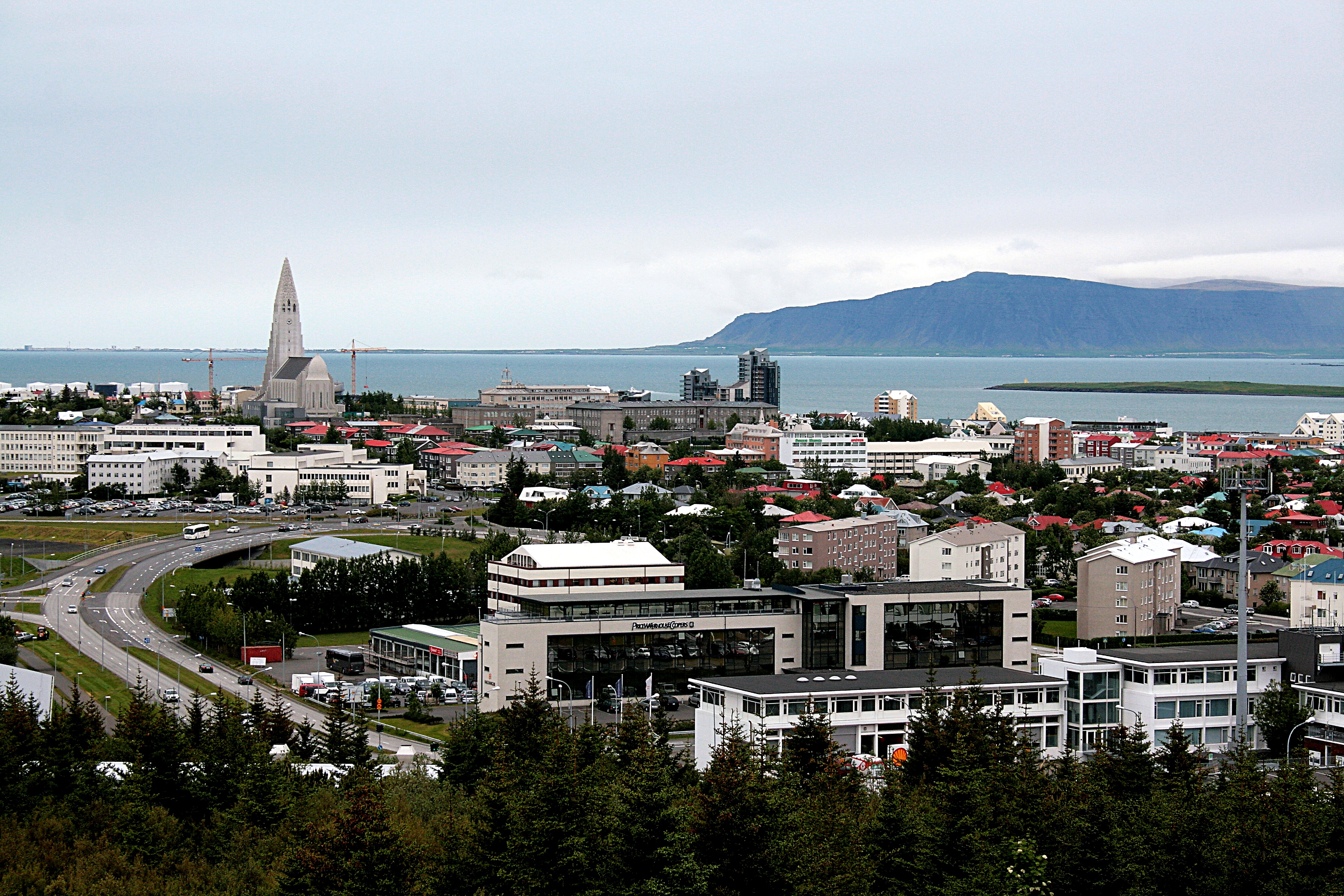
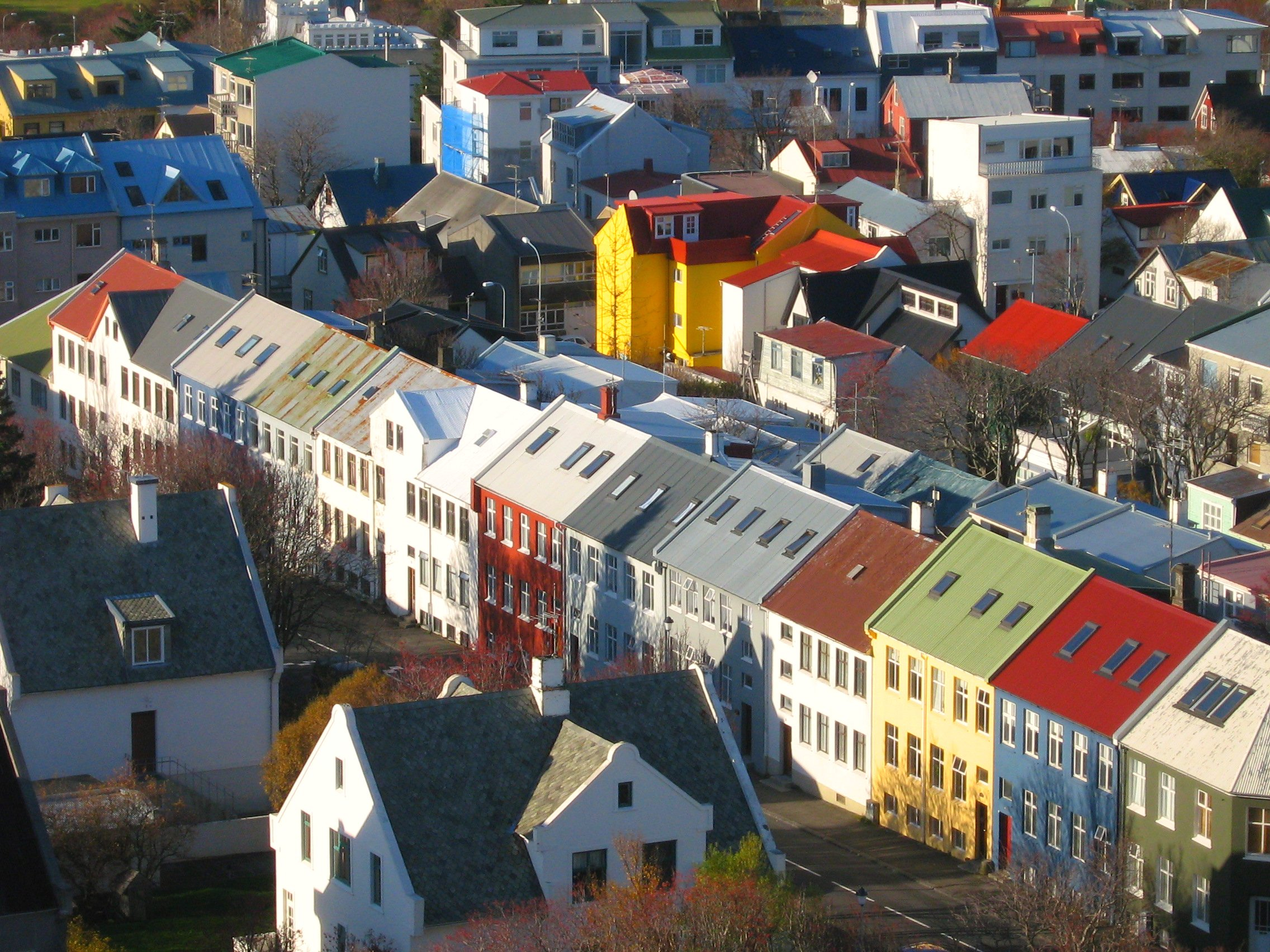
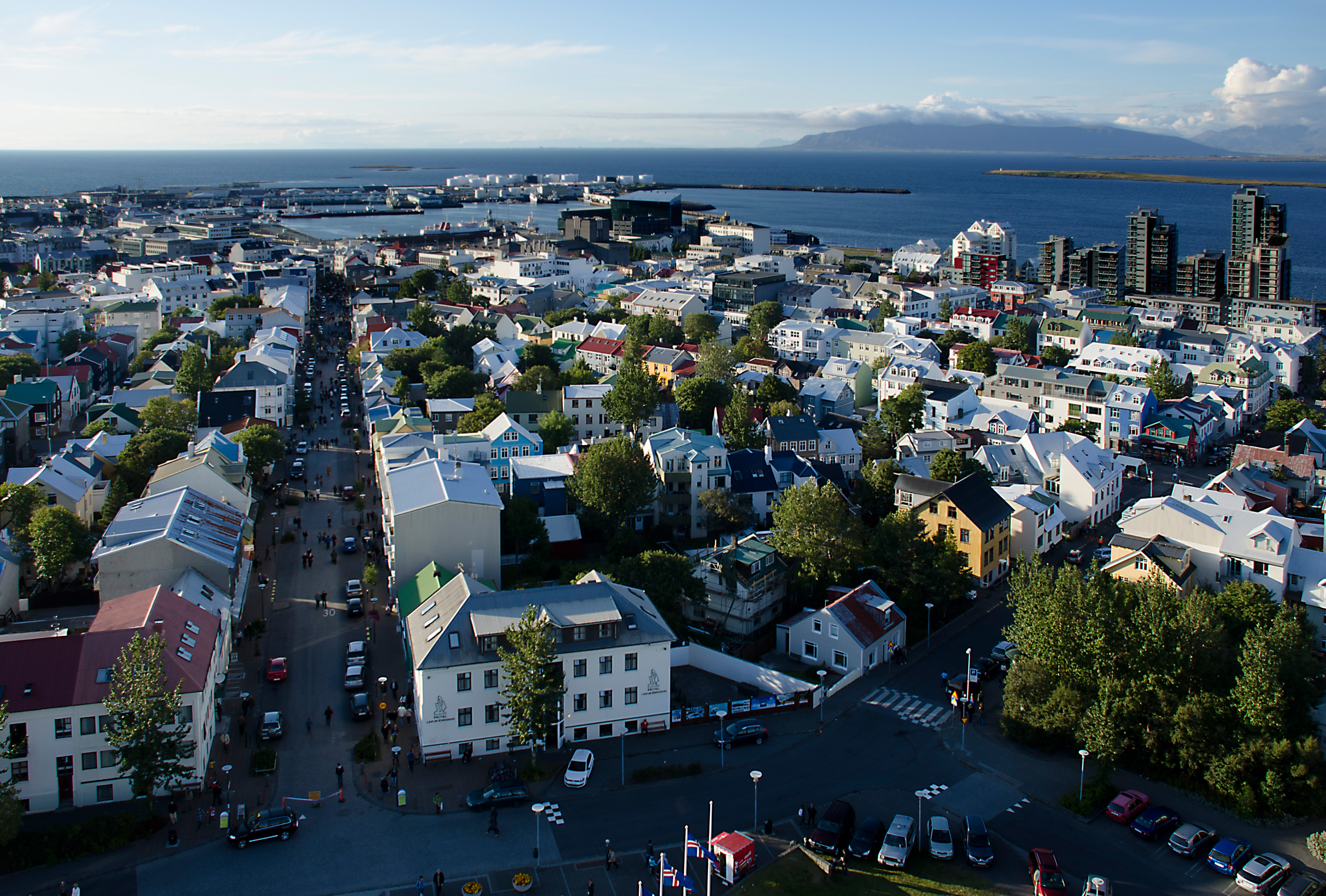
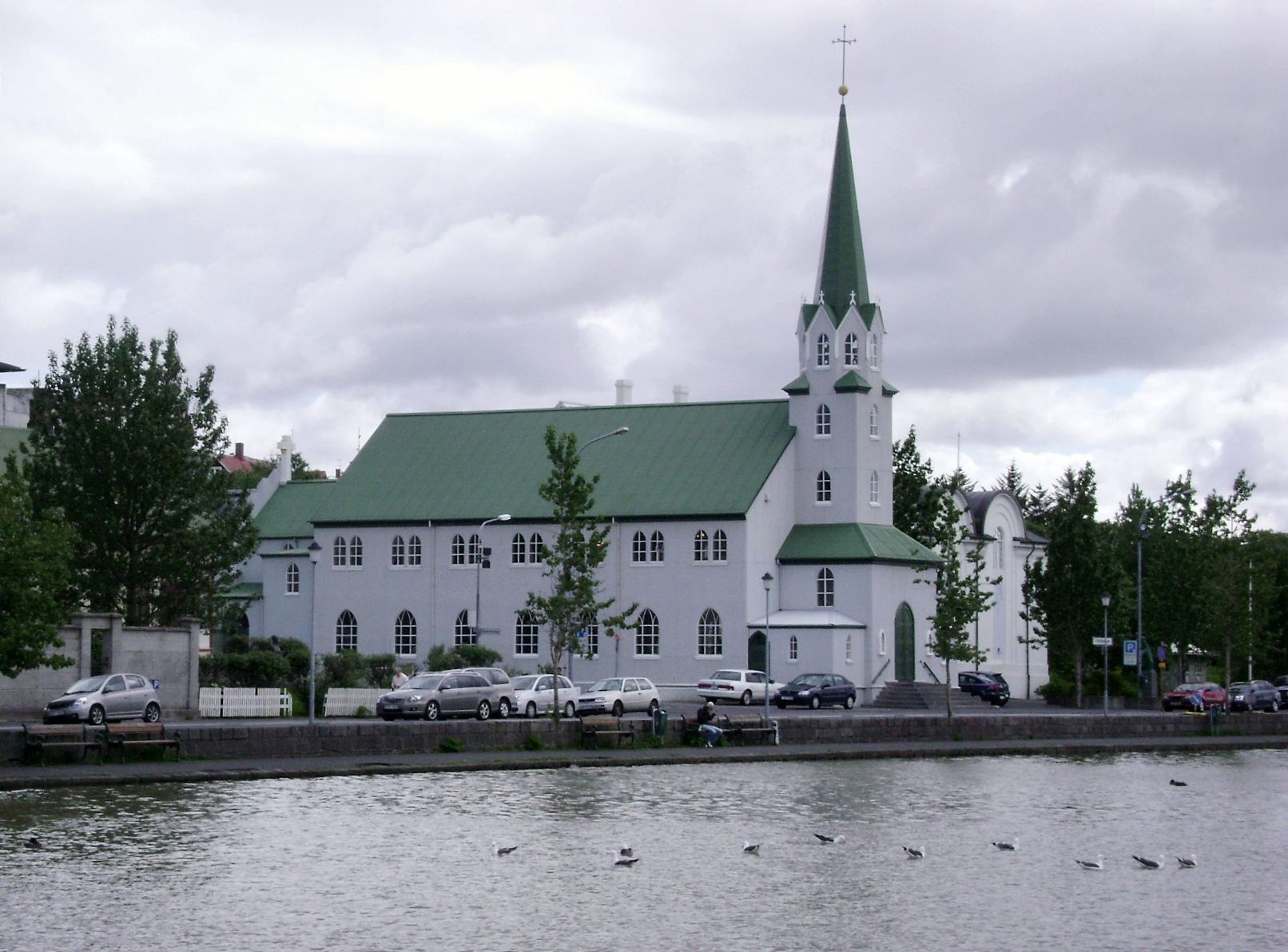
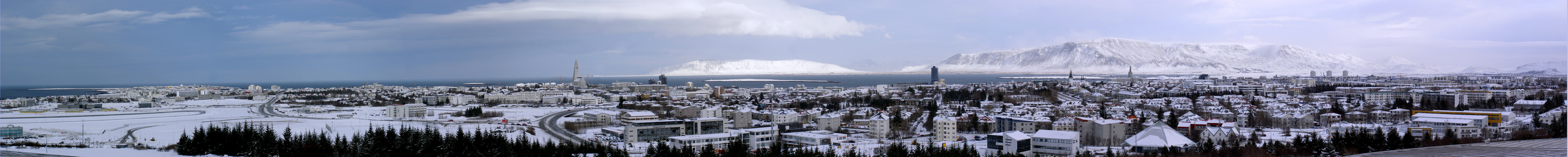
- Reykjavík from Perlan Rooftops from Hallgrímskirkja Reykjavík from Hallgrímskirkja Fríkirkjan í Reykjavík Panorama from Perlan

- Map of Iceland with the Capital Region highlighted
- Coordinates: 64°08′N 21°56′W
- Country: Iceland
- Largest town: Reykjavík

Area
  - Total: 1,046 km^{2} (404 sq mi)

Population (2025)
  - Total: 249,054
  - Density: 238.1/km^{2} (617/sq mi)
- Time zone: UTC+00:00 (WET)
- ISO 3166 code: IS-1

The Capital Region (Icelandic: Höfuðborgarsvæðið (Note: lit. 'capital area'; pronounced [ˈhœːvʏðˌpɔrkarˌsvaiːðɪθ])) is a region in southwestern Iceland. It is one of the two classified Nomenclature of Territorial Units for Statistics (NUTS-2) statistical regions of Iceland. The region encompasses an area of 1,046 km^{2} (404 sq mi), and consists of the national capital Reykjavík and six municipalities around it. Though it is much smaller than most of the other regions of Iceland, the region hosts about two-thirds of the population of the country.

== Classification ==
The country of Iceland is organized into eight regions for statistical and administrative purposes. The Nomenclature of Territorial Units for Statistics (NUTS) organizes the country into two broader level sub-divisions. These are classified as a NUTS-2 statistical regions of Iceland, and incorporate one or more regions within it. The regions form the NUTS-3 territorial units under them.

== Geography ==
The Capital Region of Iceland incorporates the regions around the nation's capital Reykjavík, encompassing an area of 1,046 km^{2} (404 sq mi). The region is located in the south-western corner of the island, which is situated at the confluence of the North Atlantic and Arctic oceans. Apart from its western coast, the region is bordered by Southern Peninsula to the south, Western Region to the north, and Southern Region to the east.

=== Sub-divisions ===
Seven municipalities make up the Capital Region with Reykjavík being the most populated by far with 138,772 inhabitants. While Kjósarhreppur is the largest municipality by area, spread around 284 km^{2} (110 sq mi), it is entirely rural and has the least population. Seltjarnarnes is the smallest municipality by land area. Each municipality has its own elected council, and take care of utilities like waste policy, public transport and fire fighting.

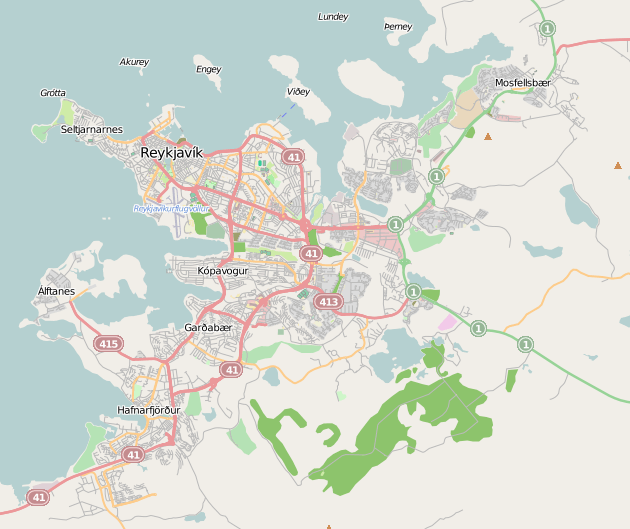
The greater Reykjavík area on OpenStreetMap

Municipality	Population (2025)	Area (km^{2})	Density (Pop/km^{2})
Reykjavík	138,772	244	568.74
Kópavogur	40,040	110	364
Hafnarfjörður	31,525	174	181.18
Garðabær	20,116	46	437.30
Mosfellsbær	13,715	186	73.74
Seltjarnarnes	4,585	2	2,292.50
Kjósarhreppur	301	284	1.06
Total	249,054	1,046	238.10

== Demographics ==
Historical population

Year	Pop.	±% p.a.
1920	21,441	—
1930	33,854	+4.67%
1940	43,841	+2.62%
1950	65,080	+4.03%
1960	89,493	+3.24%
1970	109,238	+2.01%

Year	Pop.	±% p.a.
1980	121,698	+1.09%
1990	145,980	+1.84%
2000	175,000	+1.83%
2010	196,916	+1.19%
2020	228,418	+1.50%
2025	249,054	+1.74%

Source: Statistics Iceland

The region hosts about two-thirds of the population of the country. As of 2025, there are 249,054 people residing the region, of whom 126,527 are male and 122,378 are female. The population density is of 238.10 inhabitants per square kilometre. The region has a very high Human Development Index, and is one of the most developed regions in Europe. Of the labor force, nearly 25% are involved in professional and administrative work including government offices.

For statistic purposes, Statistics Iceland has defined contiguous urban areas which are different from municipal boundaries. An urban area might straddle multiple municipalities and a single municipality may contain more than one urban area. The Greater Reykjavík area houses more than 98% of the population of the region, incorporating three of the six municipalities completely, and most parts of Reykjavík and two other municipalities except Kjósarhreppur. The remaining population is spread across the minor urban areas of Álftanes, Grundarhverfi, and Mosfellsdalur. There is a small percent of population that is classified as rural.

Urban area	Population (2024)	Municipalities
Greater Reykjavík	239,733	Reykjavík, Kópavogur, Hafnarfjörður, Garðabær, Mosfellsbær, Seltjarnarnes, Kjósarhreppur
Álftanes	2,487	Garðabær
Grundarhverfi	530	Reykjavík
Mosfellsdalur	267	Mosfellsbær
Rural	1,160	Kjósarhreppur
Total	244,177	

== See also ==
- Akureyri
- Krýsuvík (volcanic system)
- Regions of Iceland
