= Swimming at the 1992 Summer Olympics – Men's 4 × 100 metre medley relay =

Men's 4 × 100 metre medley relay at the Games of the XXV Olympiad
- Venue: Piscines Bernat Picornell
- Date: 31 July 1992 (heats & final)
- Competitors: 103 from 23 nations
- Teams: 23
- Winning time: 3:36.93 =WR

Medalists
1st place, gold medalist(s)		Jeff Rouse, Nelson Diebel, Pablo Morales, Jon Olsen, David Berkoff*, Hans Dersch*, Melvin Stewart*, Matt Biondi*	United States
2nd place, silver medalist(s)		Vladimir Selkov, Vasily Ivanov, Pavlo Khnykin, Alexander Popov, Vladimir Pyshnenko*, Vladislav Kulikov*, Dmitry Volkov*	Unified Team
3rd place, bronze medalist(s)		Mark Tewksbury, Jonathan Cleveland, Marcel Gery, Stephen Clarke, Tom Ponting*; *Indicates the swimmer only competed in the preliminary heats.	Canada

The men's 4 × 100 metre medley relay event at the 1992 Summer Olympics took place on 31 July at the Piscines Bernat Picornell in Barcelona, Spain.

== Records ==
Prior to this competition, the existing world and Olympic records were as follows.

World record	United States (USA); David Berkoff (54.56); Richard Schroeder (1:01.64); Matt Biondi (52.38); Chris Jacobs (48.35)	3:36.93	Seoul, South Korea	25 September 1988
Olympic record	United States; David Berkoff (54.56); Richard Schroeder (1:01.64); Matt Biondi (52.38); Chris Jacobs (48.35)	3:36.93	Seoul, South Korea	25 September 1988

The following new world and Olympic records were set during this competition.

Date	Event	Name	Nationality	Time	Record
31 July	Final	Jeff Rouse	United States	53.86	WR^{BK}
31 July	Final	Jeff Rouse (53.86); Nelson Diebel (1:01.45); Pablo Morales (52.83); Jon Olsen (48.79)	United States	3:36.93	=WR

BK – Backstroke lead-off leg

== Results ==
=== Heats ===
Rule: The eight fastest teams advance to the final (Q).

Rank	Heat	Lane	Nation	Swimmers	Time	Notes
1	3	4	United States	David Berkoff (55.05); Hans Dersch (1:01.79); Melvin Stewart (54.34); Matt Biondi (48.66)	3:39.84	Q
2	3	5	Unified Team	Vladimir Selkov (56.29); Dmitry Volkov (1:01.87); Vladislav Kulikov (54.43); Vladimir Pyshnenko (49.63)	3:42.22	Q
3	1	4	Canada	Mark Tewksbury (55.64); Jonathan Cleveland (1:02.16); Marcel Gery (54.14); Tom Ponting (50.53)	3:42.47	Q
4	2	6	Germany	Tino Weber (56.13); Mark Warnecke (1:02.75); Christian Keller (54.11); Bengt Zikarsky (50.01)	3:43.00	Q
5	2	5	France	Franck Schott (56.63); Stéphane Vossart (1:02.50); Franck Esposito (54.58); Christophe Kalfayan (49.42)	3:43.13	Q
6	1	5	Hungary	Tamás Deutsch (56.88); Norbert Rózsa (1:01.18); Péter Horváth (54.95); Béla Szabados (50.60)	3:43.61	Q, NR
7	2	4	Australia	Tom Stachewicz (57.17); Phil Rogers (1:01.89); Jon Sieben (54.73); Chris Fydler (49.99)	3:43.78	Q
8	1	3	Japan	Hajime Itoi (56.70); Akira Hayashi (1:01.47); Keiichi Kawanaka (54.56); Tsutomu Nakano (51.15)	3:43.88	Q, NR
9	3	3	Great Britain	Martin Harris (57.45); Nick Gillingham (1:01.63); Richard Leishman (54.88); Roland Lee (50.00)	3:43.96	
10	3	6	Spain	Martín López-Zubero (55.72); Ramón Camallonga (1:03.02); Jaime Fernández (54.60); Carlos Ventosa (50.78)	3:44.12	
11	3	2	Italy	Emanuele Merisi (57.25); Gianni Minervini (1:02.96); Leonardo Michelotti (54.66); Massimo Trevisan (49.43)	3:44.30	
12	1	6	Puerto Rico	Manuel Guzmán (57.50); Todd Torres (1:02.49); David Monasterio (56.48); Ricardo Busquets (50.05)	3:46.52	NR
13	2	3	China	Lin Laijiu (57.54); Chen Jianhong (1:02.46); Shen Jianqiang (55.06); Xie Jun (51.79)	3:46.85	
14	1	7	South Africa	Seddon Keyter (58.44); Kenneth Cawood (1:03.49); Peter Williams (54.13); Darryl Cronjé (50.80)	3:46.86	AF
15	1	2	Estonia	Ilmar Ojase (57.24); Marko Pachel (1:03.32); Aldo Suurväli (55.57); Indrek Sei (50.74)	3:46.87	
16	2	2	Belgium	Yasuhiro Vandewalle (56.65); Frédérik Deburghgraeve (1:02.89); Stefaan Maene (55.46); Marc Verbeeck (52.64)	3:47.64	
17	3	7	Norway	Thomas Sopp (58.54); Børge Mørk (1:05.08); Trond Høines (57.27); Jarl Inge Melberg (51.53)	3:52.42	
18	3	1	Philippines	Raymond Papa (57.86); Patrick Concepcion (1:04.85); Joseph Eric Buhain (55.95); Leo Najera (54.98)	3:53.64	NR
19	2	1	Hong Kong	Arthur Li Kai Yien (1:01.59); Andrew Rutherfurd (1:04.87); Duncan Todd (57.99); Michael Wright (52.01)	3:56.46	
20	2	7	Finland	Jani Sievinen (1:13.02); Petri Suominen (1:04.89); Vesa Hanski (57.37); Antti Kasvio (50.90)	4:06.18	
21	2	8	United Arab Emirates	Mohamed Bin Abid (1:08.88); Obaid Al-Rumaithi (1:13.20); Mohamed Khamis (1:02.51); Ahmad Faraj (56.44)	4:21.03	
22	1	7	Guam	Patrick Sagisi (1:01.65); Glenn Diaz (1:10.03); Ray Flores (1:01.62); Adrian Romero (54.68)	4:07.98	NR
23	3	8	Guatemala	Roberto Bonilla (1:04.65); Helder Torres (1:12.87); Gustavo Bucaro (1:00.12); Andrés Sedano (55.01)	4:12.65	

=== Final ===
Rank	Lane	Nation	Swimmers	Time	Notes
1st place, gold medalist(s)	4	United States	Jeff Rouse (53.86) WR; Nelson Diebel (1:01.45); Pablo Morales (52.83); Jon Olsen (48.79)	3:36.93	=WR
2nd place, silver medalist(s)	5	Unified Team	Vladimir Selkov (55.50); Vasily Ivanov (1:01.59); Pavlo Khnykin (53.56); Alexander Popov (47.91)	3:38.56	EU
3rd place, bronze medalist(s)	3	Canada	Mark Tewksbury (54.09); Jonathan Cleveland (1:01.93); Marcel Gery (53.72); Stephen Clarke (49.92)	3:39.66	
4	6	Germany	Tino Weber (55.75); Mark Warnecke (1:01.89); Christian Keller (53.93); Mark Pinger (48.62)	3:40.19	NR
5	2	France	Franck Schott (55.46); Stéphane Vossart (1:02.22); Bruno Gutzeit (53.87); Stéphan Caron (48.96)	3:40.51	NR
6	7	Hungary	Tamás Deutsch (56.18); Norbert Rózsa (1:00.84); Péter Horváth (54.85); Béla Szabados (50.16)	3:42.03	NR
7	1	Australia	Tom Stachewicz (56.84); Phil Rogers (1:01.31); Jon Sieben (54.78); Chris Fydler (49.72)	3:42.65	
8	8	Japan	Hajime Itoi (56.53); Akira Hayashi (1:00.98); Keiichi Kawanaka (54.32); Tsutomu Nakano (51.42)	3:43.25	NR
