= Swimming at the 1992 Summer Olympics – Men's 100 metre backstroke =

Men's 100 metre backstroke at the Games of the XXV Olympiad
- Venue: Piscines Bernat Picornell
- Date: 30 July 1992 (heats & finals)
- Competitors: 53 from 37 nations
- Winning time: 53.98 OR

Medalists
1st place, gold medalist(s)		Mark Tewksbury	Canada
2nd place, silver medalist(s)		Jeff Rouse	United States
3rd place, bronze medalist(s)		David Berkoff	United States

The men's 100 metre backstroke event at the 1992 Summer Olympics took place on 30 July at the Piscines Bernat Picornell in Barcelona, Spain.

== Records ==
Prior to this competition, the existing world and Olympic records were as follows.

World record	Jeff Rouse (USA)	53.93	Edmonton, Canada	25 August 1991
Olympic record	David Berkoff (USA)	54.51	Seoul, South Korea	24 September 1988

The following records were established during the competition:

Date	Round	Name	Nationality	Time	Record
30 July	Final A	Mark Tewksbury	Canada	53.98	OR

== Results ==
=== Heats ===
Rule: The eight fastest swimmers advance to final A (Q), while the next eight to final B (q).

Rank	Heat	Lane	Name	Nationality	Time	Notes
1	7	4	Jeff Rouse	United States	54.63	Q
2	6	5	Mark Tewksbury	Canada	54.75	Q
3	6	4	David Berkoff	United States	54.84	Q
4	5	4	Martín López-Zubero	Spain	55.37	Q
5	5	8	Vladimir Selkov	Unified Team	55.72	Q
6	7	5	Franck Schott	France	55.84	Q
7	7	6	Rodolfo Falcón	Cuba	55.99	Q, NR
8	5	5	Dirk Richter	Germany	56.03	Q
9	5	3	Hajime Itoi	Japan	56.18	q
10	5	6	Yasuhiro Vandewalle	Belgium	56.20	q
11	6	6	Tino Weber	Germany	56.27	q
12	7	7	Stefaan Maene	Belgium	56.34	q
13	7	2	Tamás Deutsch	Hungary	56.47	q
14	3	7	Georgi Mihalev	Bulgaria	56.59	q, NR
15	5	7	Carlos Ventosa	Spain	56.62	q
16	4	5	Emanuele Merisi	Italy	56.80	q
17	5	2	Manuel Guzmán	Puerto Rico	56.93	
18	7	8	Raymond Brown	Canada	56.98	
19	6	1	Tom Stachewicz	Australia	57.03	
20	7	3	Ilmar Ojase	Estonia	57.08	
21	4	2	Rogério Romero	Brazil	57.28	
22	6	3	Derya Büyükuncu	Turkey	57.38	
23	7	1	Stefano Battistelli	Italy	57.40	
24	4	7	Rastislav Bizub	Czechoslovakia	57.57	
24	6	7	Martin Harris	Great Britain	57.57	
26	3	5	Marcel Blažo	Czechoslovakia	57.61	
27	4	4	Keita Soraoka	Japan	57.64	
28	5	1	Eran Groumi	Israel	57.67	
29	2	4	Alejandro Alvizuri	Peru	57.72	NR
30	4	3	Adam Ruckwood	Great Britain	57.75	
31	6	2	Lin Laijiu	China	57.85	
32	4	8	Seddon Keyter	South Africa	57.94	
33	6	8	Simon Percy	New Zealand	57.96	
34	3	1	Dragomir Markov	Bulgaria	58.17	
35	3	3	Sebastián Lasave	Argentina	58.22	
36	3	2	David Holderbach	France	58.25	
37	3	4	Rudi Dollmayer	Sweden	58.26	
38	3	8	Ricardo Busquets	Puerto Rico	58.42	
39	4	1	Thomas Sopp	Norway	58.45	
40	3	6	Ji Sang-jun	South Korea	58.62	
41	2	5	Olivér Ágh	Hungary	59.02	
42	2	1	Miguel Arrobas	Portugal	59.37	
43	2	2	Raymond Papa	Philippines	59.58	
44	2	3	Leo Najera	Philippines	59.92	
45	4	6	Toby Haenen	Australia	1:00.08	
46	2	7	Patrick Sagisi	Guam	1:01.84	
47	1	5	Marcos Prono	Paraguay	1:02.72	
48	2	6	Timothy Eneas	Bahamas	1:03.10	
49	1	6	Salvador Jiménez	Honduras	1:04.60	
50	1	2	Carl Probert	Fiji	1:04.92	
51	1	3	Jarrah Al-Asmawi	Kuwait	1:05.53	
52	1	7	Abdullah Sultan	United Arab Emirates	1:08.22	
	1	4	Nayef Al-Hasawi	Kuwait	DNS	

=== Finals ===
==== Final B ====
Rank	Lane	Name	Nationality	Time	Notes
9	5	Yasuhiro Vandewalle	Belgium	56.36	
10	6	Stefaan Maene	Belgium	56.47	
11	3	Tino Weber	Germany	56.49	
12	4	Hajime Itoi	Japan	56.64	
13	2	Tamás Deutsch	Hungary	56.70	
14	1	Carlos Ventosa	Spain	56.78	
15	7	Georgi Mihalev	Bulgaria	56.85	
16	8	Emanuele Merisi	Italy	57.71	

==== Final A ====
Rank	Lane	Name	Nationality	Time	Notes
1st place, gold medalist(s)	5	Mark Tewksbury	Canada	53.98	OR
2nd place, silver medalist(s)	4	Jeff Rouse	United States	54.04	
3rd place, bronze medalist(s)	3	David Berkoff	United States	54.78	
4	6	Martín López-Zubero	Spain	54.96	
5	2	Vladimir Selkov	Unified Team	55.49	
6	7	Franck Schott	France	55.72	
7	1	Rodolfo Falcón	Cuba	55.76	NR
8	8	Dirk Richter	Germany	56.26	
