= Swimming at the 1992 Summer Olympics – Men's 100 metre freestyle =

Men's 100-metre freestyle at the Games of the XXV Olympiad
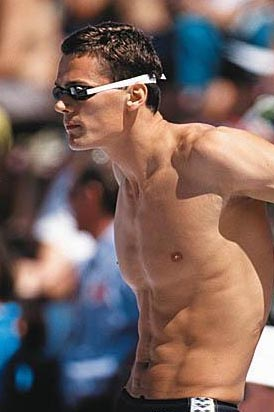
- Alexander Popov
- Venue: Piscines Bernat Picornell
- Date: 28 July 1992 (heats & finals)
- Competitors: 75 from 52 nations
- Winning time: 49.02

Medalists
1st place, gold medalist(s)		Alexander Popov; Unified Team
2nd place, silver medalist(s)		Gustavo Borges; Brazil
3rd place, bronze medalist(s)		Stéphan Caron; France

The men's 100 metre freestyle event at the 1992 Summer Olympics took place on 28 July at the Piscines Bernat Picornell in Barcelona, Spain. There were 75 competitors from 52 nations. Nations had been limited to two swimmers each since the 1984 Games. The event was won by Alexander Popov of the Unified Team. Gustavo Borges's silver was Brazil's first medal in the men's 100 metre freestyle since 1960. Stéphan Caron of France repeated as bronze medalist, the eighth man to win multiple medals in the event. It was the first time since 1968 that the United States had competed and not won the event and the first time since 1956 that the Americans had competed and not taken any medal, as Jon Olsen finished fourth and defending champion Matt Biondi came in fifth.

== Background ==
This was the 21st appearance of the men's 100 metre freestyle. The event has been held at every Summer Olympics except 1900 (when the shortest freestyle was the 200 metres), though the 1904 version was measured in yards rather than metres.

Five of the eight finalists from the 1988 Games returned: gold medalist Matt Biondi of the United States, bronze medalist Stéphan Caron of France, fourth-place finisher Gennadiy Prigoda of the Soviet Union (now competing for the Unified Team), sixth-place finisher Andrew Baildon of Australia, and eighth-place finisher Tommy Werner of Sweden.

Biondi was the favorite, having also won the 1991 World Championship and his 1988 world record still standing. Caron and 1991 European Champion Alexander Popov were also contenders.

Albania, Lithuania, the Maldives, Saudi Arabia, and the Seychelles each made their debut in the event; some former Soviet republics competed as the Unified Team and competitors from Yugoslavia competed as Independent Olympic Participants. The United States made its 20th appearance, most of any nation, having missed only the boycotted 1980 Games.

== Competition format ==
This freestyle swimming competition used the A/B final format instituted in 1984. The competition consisted of two rounds: heats and finals. The swimmers with the best 8 times in the semifinals advanced to the A final, competing for medals through 8th place. The swimmers with the next 8 times in the semifinals competed in the B final for 9th through 16th place. Swim-offs were used as necessary to determine advancement.

== Records ==
Prior to this competition, the existing world and Olympic records were as follows.

World record	Matt Biondi (USA)	48.42	Austin, United States	10 August 1988
Olympic record	Matt Biondi (USA)	48.63	Seoul, South Korea	22 September 1988

No new world or Olympic records were set during the competition. Gustavo Borges set a new South American area record, and two national records were set: the Russian record by Alexander Popov and the Puerto Rican record by Ricardo Busquets.

== Schedule ==
All times are Central European Summer Time (UTC+2)

Date	Time	Round
Tuesday, 28 July 1992	10:30; 18:30	Heats; Finals

== Results ==
=== Heats ===
Rule: The eight fastest swimmers advance to final A (Q), while the next eight to final B (q).

Rank	Heat	Lane	Swimmer	Nation	Time	Notes
1	10	3	Alexander Popov	Unified Team	49.29	QA
2	10	5	Gustavo Borges	Brazil	49.49	QA
3	8	4	Jon Olsen	United States	49.63	QA
4	10	4	Matt Biondi	United States	49.75	QA
5	9	4	Stéphan Caron	France	49.82	QA
6	8	6	Tommy Werner	Sweden	50.00	QA
6	10	2	Gennadiy Prigoda	Unified Team	50.00	QA
8	9	7	Christian Tröger	Germany	50.05	QA
9	9	3	Raimundas Mažuolis	Lithuania	50.17	QB
10	8	3	Chris Fydler	Australia	50.26	QB
11	9	5	Nils Rudolph	Germany	50.29	QB
12	9	6	Christophe Kalfayan	France	50.30	QB
13	7	3	Ricardo Busquets	Puerto Rico	50.31	QB
14	10	1	John Steel	New Zealand	50.59	QB
14	10	7	Andrew Baildon	Australia	50.59	QB
16	8	5	Giorgio Lamberti	Italy	50.65	QB, WD
17	10	6	Roberto Gleria	Italy	50.66	QB
18	8	2	Håkan Karlsson	Sweden	50.73	
18	8	8	Stephen Clarke	Canada	50.73	
20	8	1	Béla Szabados	Hungary	50.78	
21	9	2	Mike Fibbens	Great Britain	50.93	
22	7	4	Rodrigo González	Mexico	51.04	
23	6	1	Stéfan Voléry	Switzerland	51.05	
24	10	8	Paul Howe	Great Britain	51.12	
25	9	1	Emanuel Nascimento	Brazil	51.17	
26	9	8	Franz Mortensen	Denmark	51.29	
27	8	7	Uğur Taner	Turkey	51.34	
28	7	5	Jarl Inge Melberg	Norway	51.39	
29	7	6	Seddon Keyter	South Africa	51.42	
30	1	2	Mladen Kapor	Independent Olympic Participants	51.44	
31	7	1	Yoav Bruck	Israel	51.46	
32	6	6	Indrek Sei	Estonia	51.47	
32	7	2	Yves Clausse	Luxembourg	51.47	
34	7	8	Tsutomu Nakano	Japan	51.63	
35	6	5	Krzysztof Cwalina	Poland	51.70	
36	6	7	Nicholas Sanders	New Zealand	51.77	
37	6	2	Giovanni Linscheer	Suriname	51.82	
38	5	7	Janne Blomqvist	Finland	51.86	
39	6	8	Michael Wright	Hong Kong	51.88	
40	6	4	Xie Jun	China	51.94	
41	6	3	Darren Ward	Canada	52.05	
42	5	4	Arthur Li Kai Yien	Hong Kong	52.22	
43	5	1	Allan Murray	Bahamas	52.43	
44	5	2	Stavros Michaelides	Cyprus	52.54	
45	4	8	Shigeo Ogata	Japan	52.74	
46	5	5	Ivor Le Roux	Zimbabwe	52.92	
47	4	6	Enrico Linscheer	Suriname	52.94	
48	5	6	Marc Verbeeck	Belgium	52.97	
49	5	3	Sebastián Lasave	Argentina	53.07	
50	4	5	Geribryan Mewett	Bermuda	53.14	
51	3	4	Ian Steed Raynor	Bermuda	53.16	
52	4	4	Mohamed El-Azoul	Egypt	53.31	
53	4	3	Nikos Paleokrassas	Greece	53.47	
54	3	5	Rhoderick McGown	Zimbabwe	53.65	
55	5	8	Patrick Sagisi	Guam	53.90	
56	4	1	Kenneth Yeo	Singapore	54.44	
57	3	3	Plutarco Castellanos	Honduras	54.66	
58	3	7	Gustavo Bucaro	Guatemala	54.74	
59	2	6	Adrian Romero	Guam	54.77	
60	3	6	Laurent Alfred	Virgin Islands	54.89	
61	3	1	Helder Torres	Guatemala	55.38	
62	4	7	Frank Leskaj	Albania	55.50	
63	2	4	Émile Lahoud	Lebanon	55.51	
64	1	1	Mouhamed Diop	Senegal	55.82	
65	2	3	Hussein Al-Sadiq	Saudi Arabia	55.96	
66	2	2	Ahmad Faraj	United Arab Emirates	56.05	
67	2	5	Ivan Roberts	Seychelles	56.15	
68	1	7	Bruno N'Diaye	Senegal	56.39	
69	3	2	Jarrah Al-Asmawi	Kuwait	56.72	
70	2	1	Mohamed Bin Abid	United Arab Emirates	56.82	
71	2	7	Carl Probert	Fiji	57.25	
72	1	4	Kenny Roberts	Seychelles	58.86	
73	1	5	Foy Gordon Chung	Fiji	1:03.96	
74	1	3	Ahmed Imthiyaz	Maldives	1:04.96	
75	1	6	Mohamed Rasheed	Maldives	1:08.12	
—	4	2	Nayef Al-Hasawi	Kuwait	DNS	
—	7	7	Peter Williams	South Africa	DNS	

=== Finals ===
==== Final B ====
Rank	Lane	Swimmer	Nation	Time	Notes
9	2	Ricardo Busquets	Puerto Rico	49.92	NR
10	4	Raimundas Mažuolis	Lithuania	50.13	
11	6	Christophe Kalfayan	France	50.49	
12	3	Nils Rudolph	Germany	50.62	
13	7	John Steel	New Zealand	50.69	
14	5	Chris Fydler	Australia	50.78	
15	8	Roberto Gleria	Italy	50.81	
16	1	Andrew Baildon	Australia	50.93	

==== Final A ====
Popov won, well ahead of everyone else. An equipment error resulted in the scoreboard initially displaying Caron as the second-place swimmer and Borges as last. Borges last was an obvious mistake to anyone watching; he had been fighting for second. His touchpad had malfunctioned. Officials reviewed film of "his" finish, assigning him a time of 49.53—equal to Biondi; they then realized that the film had been of Biondi. Looking at the correct finish, the officials gave Borges a time of 49.43, good for the silver medal.

Rank	Lane	Swimmer	Nation	Time	Notes
1st place, gold medalist(s)	4	Alexander Popov	Unified Team	49.02	NR
2nd place, silver medalist(s)	5	Gustavo Borges	Brazil	49.43	SA
3rd place, bronze medalist(s)	2	Stéphan Caron	France	49.50	
4	3	Jon Olsen	United States	49.51	
5	6	Matt Biondi	United States	49.53	
6	1	Tommy Werner	Sweden	49.63	
7	8	Christian Tröger	Germany	49.84	
8	7	Gennadiy Prigoda	Unified Team	50.25	
