= Swimming at the 1992 Summer Olympics – Men's 50 metre freestyle =

Men's 50 metre freestyle at the Games of the XXV Olympiad
- Venue: Piscines Bernat Picornell
- Date: 30 July 1992 (heats & finals)
- Competitors: 76 from 41 nations
- Winning time: 21.91 OR

Medalists
1st place, gold medalist(s)		Alexander Popov	Unified Team
2nd place, silver medalist(s)		Matt Biondi	United States
3rd place, bronze medalist(s)		Tom Jager	United States

The men's 50-metre freestyle event at the 1992 Summer Olympics took place on 30 July at the Piscines Bernat Picornell in Barcelona, Spain.

== Records ==
Prior to this competition, the existing world and Olympic records were as follows.

World record	Tom Jager (USA)	21.81	Nashville, United States	24 March 1990
Olympic record	Matt Biondi (USA)	22.14	Seoul, South Korea	24 September 1988

The following records were established during the competition:

Date	Round	Name	Nationality	Time	Record
30 July	Final A	Alexander Popov	Unified Team	21.91	OR

== Competition format ==
The competition consisted of two rounds: heats and finals. The swimmers with the best 8 times in the heats advanced to final A, where they competed for the top 8 places. The swimmers with the next 8 times in the heats swam in final B, for ninth through the sixteenth place. Swim-offs were used as necessary to determine advancement.

== Results ==
=== Heats ===
Rule: The eight fastest swimmers advance to final A (Q), while the next eight to final B (q).

Rank	Heat	Lane	Name	Nationality	Time	Notes
1	8	4	Alexander Popov	Unified Team	22.21	Q
2	10	4	Matt Biondi	United States	22.32	Q
3	9	4	Tom Jager	United States	22.45	Q
4	10	1	Gennadiy Prigoda	Unified Team	22.57	Q
5	9	3	Peter Williams	South Africa	22.65	Q
6	9	6	Christophe Kalfayan	France	22.70	Q
6	9	5	Nils Rudolph	Germany	22.70	Q
8	10	5	Mark Foster	Great Britain	22.72	Q
9	8	5	Raimundas Mažuolis	Lithuania	22.77	q
10	9	2	Mark Pinger	Germany	22.88	q
11	10	3	Pär Lindström	Sweden	22.92	q
11	10	7	René Gusperti	Italy	22.92	q
13	8	3	Darren Lange	Australia	23.01	q
13	8	6	Stéphan Caron	France	23.01	q, WD
15	8	2	Gustavo Borges	Brazil	23.10	q
15	10	2	Angus Waddell	Australia	23.10	q
17	8	7	Dano Halsall	Switzerland	23.15	q
18	8	8	Krzysztof Cwalina	Poland	23.20	
19	10	6	Mike Fibbens	Great Britain	23.27	
20	6	5	Stavros Michaelides	Cyprus	23.34	
21	9	1	Allan Murray	Bahamas	23.35	
22	9	8	Darryl Cronjé	South Africa	23.39	
23	1	6	Mladen Kapor	Independent Olympic Participants	23.42	
24	7	2	Ricardo Busquets	Puerto Rico	23.44	
25	7	4	Stéfan Voléry	Switzerland	23.47	
26	7	5	Nikos Paleokrassas	Greece	23.51	
27	7	8	Rodrigo González	Mexico	23.52	
28	7	3	Nikos Steliou	Greece	23.55	
29	10	8	Franz Mortensen	Denmark	23.61	
30	5	5	Janne Blomqvist	Finland	23.63	
31	8	1	Indrek Sei	Estonia	23.68	
32	7	7	Yoav Bruck	Israel	23.72	
33	6	2	Enrico Linscheer	Suriname	23.74	
34	4	7	Todd Torres	Puerto Rico	23.79	
34	7	1	Nicholas Sanders	New Zealand	23.79	
36	7	6	Paulo Trindade	Portugal	23.81	
37	6	1	Mark Weldon	New Zealand	23.87	
37	6	4	Mohamed El-Azoul	Egypt	23.87	
39	6	3	Michael Wright	Hong Kong	23.90	
40	5	3	Stephen Clarke	Canada	23.95	
41	5	7	Teófilo Ferreira	Brazil	24.13	
41	6	8	Musa Bakare	Nigeria	24.13	
43	5	4	Pedro Lima	Angola	24.14	
44	5	1	Geribryan Mewett	Bermuda	24.20	
45	5	2	Ian Steed Raynor	Bermuda	24.23	
46	3	5	Ivor Le Roux	Zimbabwe	24.32	
47	4	1	Toshiaki Kurasawa	Japan	24.61	
48	4	3	Laurent Alfred	Virgin Islands	24.66	
49	1	7	Mouhamed Diop	Senegal	24.69	
50	6	6	Frank Leskaj	Albania	24.72	
51	4	8	Rhoderick McGown	Zimbabwe	24.75	
52	4	6	Patrick Sagisi	Guam	24.78	
53	5	8	Marc Verbeeck	Belgium	24.85	
54	2	4	Adrian Romero	Guam	25.12	
55	3	4	Plutarco Castellanos	Honduras	25.27	
56	4	2	Kenneth Yeo	Singapore	25.29	
57	1	2	Bruno N'Diaye	Senegal	25.35	
58	2	3	Ivan Roberts	Seychelles	25.44	
59	3	3	Wu Tat Cheung	Hong Kong	25.45	
60	3	2	Andrés Sedano	Guatemala	25.53	
61	3	6	Émile Lahoud	Lebanon	25.76	
62	2	5	Mohamed Bin Abid	United Arab Emirates	25.79	
63	3	1	Gustavo Bucaro	Guatemala	25.84	
64	3	7	Ahmad Faraj	United Arab Emirates	25.91	
65	2	7	Carl Probert	Fiji	26.31	
66	2	2	Filippo Piva	San Marino	26.41	
67	2	6	Roberto Pellandra	San Marino	26.51	
68	2	1	Kenny Roberts	Seychelles	26.78	
69	1	1	Gilles Coudray	Republic of the Congo	28.11	
70	1	4	Foy Gordon Chung	Fiji	28.75	
71	1	5	Ahmed Imthiyaz	Maldives	29.27	
72	1	3	Mohamed Rasheed	Maldives	30.37	
	5	6	Yves Clausse	Luxembourg	DSQ	
	4	5	José Mossiane	Mozambique	DSQ	
	4	4	Tsutomu Nakano	Japan	DSQ	
	9	7	Joakim Holmqvist	Sweden	DNS	

=== Finals ===
==== Final B ====
Rank	Lane	Name	Nationality	Time	Notes
9	2	Darren Lange	Australia	22.69	
10	4	Raimundas Mažuolis	Lithuania	22.71	
11	5	Mark Pinger	Germany	22.88	
11	6	Pär Lindström	Sweden	22.88	
13	1	Gustavo Borges	Brazil	23.01	
14	3	René Gusperti	Italy	23.04	
15	7	Angus Waddell	Australia	23.06	
16	8	Dano Halsall	Switzerland	23.18	

==== Final A ====
Rank	Lane	Name	Nationality	Time	Notes
1st place, gold medalist(s)	4	Alexander Popov	Unified Team	21.91	OR
2nd place, silver medalist(s)	5	Matt Biondi	United States	22.09	
3rd place, bronze medalist(s)	3	Tom Jager	United States	22.30	
4	2	Peter Williams	South Africa	22.50	
4	1	Christophe Kalfayan	France	22.50	
6	8	Mark Foster	Great Britain	22.52	
7	6	Gennadiy Prigoda	Unified Team	22.54	
8	7	Nils Rudolph	Germany	22.73	
