= Swimming at the 1993 Mediterranean Games =

- Venue: Piscine Marceau Crespin
- Location: Mende, France

The swimming events of the 1993 Mediterranean Games were held in Mende, Lozère in France.

== Medalists ==
=== Men's events ===
Event	Gold		Silver		Bronze	
50 m freestyle	Christophe Kalfayan (FRA)	23.02	René Gusperti (ITA)	23.23	Stavros Michaelides (CYP)	23.28
100 m freestyle	Christophe Kalfayan (FRA)	50.51	Ludovic Depickère (FRA)	50.96	Emanuele Idini (ITA)	51.66
200 m freestyle	Christophe Bordeau (FRA)	1:51.74	Carlos Ventosa (ESP)	1:52.11	Emanuele Idini (ITA) Lionel Poirot (FRA)	1:52.16 1:52.16
400 m freestyle	Christophe Marchand (FRA)	3:55.69	Jure Bučar (SLO)	3:56.71	Igor Majcen (SLO)	3:58.18
1500 m freestyle	Hisham Al-Masri (SYR)	15:32.65	Igor Majcen (SLO)	15:33.78	Benjamin Sanson (FRA)	15:36.79
100 m backstroke	Franck Schott (FRA)	56.13	Derya Büyükuncu (TUR)	56.84	Carlos Ventosa (ESP)	57.66
200 m backstroke	Derya Büyükuncu (TUR)	2:01.49	Luca Bianchin (ITA)	2:02.06	Eric Rebourg (FRA)	2:03.21
100 m breaststroke	Ramón Camallonga (ESP)	1:03.05	Stéphane Vossart (FRA)	1:03.09	Cédric Pénicaud (FRA)	1:03.95
200 m breaststroke	Cédric Pénicaud (FRA)	2:16.28	Stéphane Vossart (FRA)	2:17.07	Fabio Fusi (ITA)	2:18.72
100 m butterfly	Miloš Milošević (CRO)	53.89	Bruno Gutzeit (FRA)	54.63	Franck Esposito (FRA)	54.72
200 m butterfly	Franck Esposito (FRA)	1:59.70	Christophe Bordeau (FRA)	2:01.00	Jorge Pérez (ESP)	2:01.91
200 m individual medley	Luca Sacchi (ITA)	2:03.32	Xavier Marchand (FRA)	2:03.64	Frédéric Lefèvre (ESP)	2:04.55
400 m individual medley	Luca Sacchi (ITA)	4:22.30	David Joncourt (FRA)	4:25.42	Xavier Marchand (FRA)	4:26.12
4 × 100 m freestyle	France (FRA); Ludovic Depickère; Bruno Gutzeit; Franck Schott; Christophe Kalfayan	3:24.99	Spain (ESP); Carlos Ventosa; Josep Maria Rojano; Jesus Merino; Marcelo Cuartero	3:27.50	Italy (ITA); Alessandro Cecchini; Alessandro Bacchi; René Gusperti; Emanuele Idini	3:27.79
4 × 200 m freestyle	France (FRA); Lionel Poirot; Christophe Bordeau; Ludovic Depickère; Christophe Marchand	7:26.47	Italy (ITA); Moreno Gallina; Bruno Zorzan; Alessandro Bacchi; Emanuele Idini	7:33.42	Spain (ESP); Marc Tolosa; Carlos Ventosa; Sergio López Miró; Daniel Serra	7:33.93
4 × 100 m medley	France (FRA); Franck Schott; Stéphane Vossart; Bruno Gutzeit; Christophe Kalfayan	3:44.87	Spain (ESP); Carlos Ventosa; Sergio López Miró; Jaime Fernández; Marcelo Cuartero	3:46.79	Italy (ITA); Luca Bianchin; Massimiliano Cagelli; Luis Alberto Laera; Emanuele Idini	3:48.85

=== Women's events ===
Event	Gold		Silver		Bronze	
50 m freestyle	Julie Blaise (FRA)	26.31	Catherine Plewinski (FRA)	26.58	Blanca Cerón (ESP)	26.84
100 m freestyle	Catherine Plewinski (FRA)	57.09	Cecilia Vianini (ITA)	57.73	Julie Blaise (FRA)	58.20
200 m freestyle	Audrey Astruc (FRA)	2:04.26	Caterina Borgato (ITA)	2:04.44	Natalia Pulido (ESP)	2:04.82
400 m freestyle	Audrey Astruc (FRA)	4:16.84	Cecilia Vallorini (ITA)	4:19.93	Itziar Esparza (ESP)	4:21.02
800 m freestyle	Audrey Astruc (FRA)	8:46.00	Itziar Esparza (ESP)	8:49.09	Lisa Giagnoni (ITA)	8:51.47
100 m backstroke	Francesca Salvalajo (ITA)	1:04.80	Sabrina Cocchi (ITA)	1:04.87	Corinne Tijou (FRA)	1:05.02
200 m backstroke	Francesca Salvalajo (ITA)	2:14.82	Chiara Giavi (ITA)	2:16.45	Hélène Ricardo (FRA)	2:17.23
100 m breaststroke	Aude Heinrich (FRA)	1:11.82	Elena Donati (ITA)	1:12.24	Dorotea Bralić (CRO)	1:13.39
200 m breaststroke	Audrey Guérit (FRA)	2:34.01	Nadège Cliton (FRA)	2:34.61	Alenka Kejžar (SLO)	2:34.88
100 m butterfly	Catherine Plewinski (FRA)	1:00.45	Cécile Jeanson (FRA)	1:01.44	María Peláez (ESP)	1:02.45
200 m butterfly	Cécile Jeanson (FRA)	2:12.44	María Peláez (ESP)	2:14.37	Bárbara Franco (ESP)	2:15.63
200 m individual medley	Nadège Cliton (FRA)	2:18.92	Silvia Parera (ESP)	2:19.52	Céline Bonnet (FRA)	2:21.07
400 m individual medley	Nathalie Saint-Cyr (FRA)	4:52.40	Silvia Parera (ESP)	4:54.36	Céline Bonnet (FRA)	4:54.45
4 × 100 m freestyle	France (FRA); Julia Reggiany; Julie Blaise Olhmus-Muller; Jacqueline Delord; Catherine Plewinski	3:51.38	Italy (ITA); Cecilia Vallorini; Barbara Dall'Acqua; Livia Copariu; Cecilia Vianini	3:52.65	Greece (GRE); Antonia Machaira; Olympia Tiligada; Doukissa Iordanou; Aikaterini Sarakatsani	3:55.77
4 × 100 m medley	France (FRA); Corinne Tijou; Aude Heinrich; Cécile Jeanson; Catherine Plewinski	4:15.82	Spain (ESP); Nurio Castello; Rosario Zazo; María Peláez; Natalia Pulido	4:21.09	Croatia (CRO); Ivana Dapic; Dorotea Bralić; Gabrijela Ujčić; Tea Cerkvenik	4:21.19

== Medal table ==
Rank	Nation	Gold	Silver	Bronze	Total
1	France (FRA)	23	10	12	45
2	Italy (ITA)	4	10	6	20
3	Spain (ESP)	1	8	8	17
4	Turkey (TUR)	1	1	0	2
5	Croatia (CRO)	1	0	2	3
6	Syria (SYR)	1	0	0	1
7	Slovenia (SLO)	0	2	2	4
8	Cyprus (CYP)	0	0	1	1
8	Greece (GRE)	0	0	1	1
Totals (9 entries)		31	31	32	94
