= Swimming at the 1992 Summer Olympics – Men's 200 metre backstroke =

Men's 200 metre backstroke at the Games of the XXV Olympiad
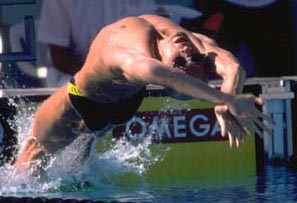
- Silver medalist Vladimir Selkov (unknown date) starting a backstroke race
- Venue: Piscines Bernat Picornell
- Date: 28 July 1992 (heats & finals)
- Competitors: 44 from 34 nations
- Winning time: 1:58.47 OR

Medalists
1st place, gold medalist(s)		Martín López-Zubero	Spain
2nd place, silver medalist(s)		Vladimir Selkov	Unified Team
3rd place, bronze medalist(s)		Stefano Battistelli	Italy

The men's 200 metre backstroke event at the 1992 Summer Olympics took place on 28 July at the Piscines Bernat Picornell in Barcelona, Spain. There were 44 competitors from 34 nations. Each nation had been limited to two swimmers in the event since 1984. The event was won by Martín López-Zubero of Spain. Vladimir Selkov of the Unified Team took silver, while Stefano Battistelli of Italy earned bronze. It was the first medal in the men's 200 metre backstroke for each nation (though the Soviet Union, from the former republics of which the Unified Team was formed, had taken gold in 1988).

== Background ==
This was the ninth appearance of the 200 metre backstroke event. It was first held in 1900. The event did not return until 1964; since then, it has been on the programme at every Summer Games. From 1904 to 1960, a men's 100 metre backstroke was held instead. In 1964, only the 200 metres was held. Beginning in 1968 and ever since, both the 100 and 200 metre versions have been held.

Two of the 8 finalists from the 1988 Games returned: fifth-place finisher Dirk Richter of East Germany (now competing for Germany) and eighth-place finisher Rogério Romero of Brazil. The medalists at the 1991 World Aquatics Championships had been Martín López-Zubero of Spain, Stefano Battistelli of Italy, and Vladimir Selkov of the Soviet Union. All three competed in Barcelona (with Selkov now representing the Unified Team). López-Zubero was also the world record holder, having broken it twice in 1991. He was the favourite in the event, with European championships in both 100 metres and 200 metres in 1991 to go along with his World title and world record.

Colombia, Estonia, Fiji, Israel, Kuwait, Norway, Paraguay, and Turkey each made their debut in the event; some former Soviet republics competed as the Unified Team. Australia and Great Britain each made their eighth appearance, tied for most among nations to that point.

== Competition format ==
The competition used a two-round (heats and final) format. The advancement rule followed the format introduced in 1952. A swimmer's place in the heat was not used to determine advancement; instead, the fastest times from across all heats in a round were used. A "consolation final" had been added in 1984. There were 6 heats of up to 8 swimmers each. The top 8 swimmers advanced to the final. The next 8 (9th through 16th) competed in a consolation final. Swim-offs were used as necessary to break ties.

This swimming event used backstroke. Because an Olympic-size swimming pool is 50 metres long, this race consisted of four lengths of the pool.

== Records ==
Prior to this competition, the existing world and Olympic records were as follows.

World record	Martín López-Zubero (ESP)	1:56.57	Tuscaloosa, United States	23 November 1991
Olympic record	Rick Carey (USA)	1:58.99	Los Angeles, United States	31 July 1984

The following records were established during the competition:

Date	Round	Swimmer	Nation	Time	Record
28 July	Final A	Martín López-Zubero	Spain	1:58.47	OR

== Schedule ==
All times are Central European Summer Time (UTC+2)

Date	Time	Round
Tuesday, 28 July 1992	12:00; 19:30	Heats; Finals

== Results ==
=== Heats ===
The eight fastest swimmers advanced to final A, while the next eight went to final B.

Rank	Heat	Lane	Swimmer	Nation	Time	Notes
1	6	4	Martín López-Zubero	Spain	1:59.22	QA
2	6	3	Tino Weber	Germany	1:59.40	QA
3	6	5	Stefano Battistelli	Italy	1:59.56	QA
4	6	7	Stefaan Maene	Belgium	1:59.64	QA, NR
5	5	6	Vladimir Selkov	Unified Team	1:59.81	QA
6	4	4	Tripp Schwenk	United States	1:59.92	QA
7	5	5	Hajime Itoi	Japan	1:59.95	QA
8	4	3	Tamás Deutsch	Hungary	2:00.50	QA
9	3	1	Rodolfo Falcón	Cuba	2:00.52	QB, NR
10	5	3	Dirk Richter	Germany	2:00.94	QB, WD
11	5	4	Royce Sharp	United States	2:00.97	QB, WD
12	5	2	Rogério Romero	Brazil	2:00.99	QB
13	3	5	Yasuhiro Vandewalle	Belgium	2:01.46	QB
14	4	2	Kevin Draxinger	Canada	2:01.73	QB
15	5	1	Raymond Brown	Canada	2:01.81	QB
16	5	7	Manuel Guzmán	Puerto Rico	2:01.84	QB
17	3	7	Georgi Mihalev	Bulgaria	2:02.24	QB
18	4	6	Luca Bianchin	Italy	2:02.65	QB
19	3	2	Marcel Blažo	Czechoslovakia	2:02.81	
20	2	2	Alejandro Alvizuri	Peru	2:03.10	NR
20	4	7	Keita Soraoka	Japan	2:03.10	
22	6	6	David Holderbach	France	2:03.11	
23	4	1	Rastislav Bizub	Czechoslovakia	2:03.30	
24	4	8	Adam Ruckwood	Great Britain	2:03.54	
25	3	4	Jorge Pérez	Spain	2:03.68	
26	2	3	Alejandro Bermúdez	Colombia	2:04.46	
27	3	3	Olivér Ágh	Hungary	2:04.52	
28	2	5	Simon Percy	New Zealand	2:05.53	
29	2	4	Ji Sang-jun	South Korea	2:05.56	
30	2	6	Ilmar Ojase	Estonia	2:05.76	
31	6	1	Thomas Sopp	Norway	2:05.91	
32	5	8	Matthew O'Connor	Great Britain	2:05.94	
33	4	5	Derya Büyükuncu	Turkey	2:06.01	
34	2	7	Miguel Arrobas	Portugal	2:06.02	
35	6	2	Toby Haenen	Australia	2:06.79	
36	3	6	Lars Sørensen	Denmark	2:06.80	
37	2	1	Eran Groumi	Israel	2:07.91	
38	1	6	Gary Tan	Singapore	2:11.36	
39	1	5	Marcos Prono	Paraguay	2:15.25	
40	1	3	Sultan Al-Otaibi	Kuwait	2:19.02	
41	1	2	Salvador Jiménez	Honduras	2:20.15	
42	1	7	Carl Probert	Fiji	2:22.54	
—	1	1	Abdullah Sultan	United Arab Emirates	DSQ	
—	1	4	Raymond Papa	Philippines	DSQ	
—	6	8	Jani Sievinen	Finland	DNS	

=== Finals ===
The finals were held on the evening of 28 July.

==== Final B ====
Rank	Lane	Swimmer	Nation	Time
9	4	Rodolfo Falcón	Cuba	2:00.22, NR
10	5	Rogério Romero	Brazil	2:01.02
11	8	Luca Bianchin	Italy	2:01.70
12	6	Kevin Draxinger	Canada	2:01.79
13	7	Manuel Guzmán	Puerto Rico	2:01.87
14	3	Yasuhiro Vandewalle	Belgium	2:02.45
15	2	Raymond Brown	Canada	2:03.01
—	1	Georgi Mihalev	Bulgaria	DSQ

==== Final A ====
Selkov went out first and led for most of the first three lengths. Itoi took the lead at the third turn. López-Zubero and Battistelli finished strong, with the former taking the lead with 25 metres to go; the latter caught Itoi but not Selkov.

Rank	Lane	Swimmer	Nation	Time	Notes
1st place, gold medalist(s)	4	Martín López-Zubero	Spain	1:58.47	OR
2nd place, silver medalist(s)	2	Vladimir Selkov	Unified Team	1:58.87	
3rd place, bronze medalist(s)	3	Stefano Battistelli	Italy	1:59.40	
4	1	Hajime Itoi	Japan	1:59.52	
5	7	Tripp Schwenk	United States	1:59.73	
6	5	Tino Weber	Germany	1:59.78	
7	8	Tamás Deutsch	Hungary	2:00.06	
8	6	Stefaan Maene	Belgium	2:00.91	
