= Swimming at the 1992 Summer Olympics – Men's 100 metre butterfly =

Men's 100 metre butterfly at the Games of the XXV Olympiad
- Venue: Piscines Bernat Picornell
- Date: 27 July 1992 (heats & finals)
- Competitors: 71 from 59 nations
- Winning time: 53.32

Medalists
1st place, gold medalist(s)		Pablo Morales	United States
2nd place, silver medalist(s)		Rafał Szukała	Poland
3rd place, bronze medalist(s)		Anthony Nesty	Suriname

The men's 100 metre butterfly event at the 1992 Summer Olympics took place on 27 July at the Piscines Bernat Picornell in Barcelona, Spain.

== Records ==
Prior to this competition, the existing world and Olympic records were as follows.

World record	Pablo Morales (USA)	52.84	Orlando, United States	23 June 1986
Olympic record	Anthony Nesty (SUR)	53.00	Seoul, South Korea	21 September 1988

== Results ==
=== Heats ===
Rule: The eight fastest swimmers advance to final A (Q), while the next eight to final B (q).

Rank	Heat	Lane	Name	Nationality	Time	Notes
1	8	4	Pablo Morales	United States	53.59	Q
2	7	3	Rafał Szukała	Poland	53.60	Q
3	9	4	Anthony Nesty	Suriname	53.89	Q
4	8	5	Marcel Gery	Canada	53.94	Q
5	9	7	Pavlo Khnykin	Unified Team	54.02	Q
6	1	8	Martín López-Zubero	Spain	54.04	Q, NR
7	9	2	Vladislav Kulikov	Unified Team	54.23	Q
8	7	4	Melvin Stewart	United States	54.26	Q
9	7	7	Bruno Gutzeit	France	54.35	q
10	6	8	Christian Keller	Germany	54.47	q
11	7	5	Shen Jianqiang	China	54.53	q
12	8	7	Jani Sievinen	Finland	54.57	q
13	8	2	Martin Herrmann	Germany	54.59	q
14	9	3	Jon Sieben	Australia	54.67	q
15	8	3	Tom Ponting	Canada	54.77	q
16	7	2	José Carlos Souza	Brazil	54.78	q
17	8	1	Andrew Baildon	Australia	54.80	
18	7	1	Eduardo Piccinini	Brazil	54.87	
19	8	6	Richard Leishman	Great Britain	54.96	
20	6	1	Eran Groumi	Israel	55.18	
20	6	4	Keiichi Kawanaka	Japan	55.18	
22	9	1	Franck Esposito	France	55.26	
23	7	8	Leonardo Michelotti	Italy	55.28	
24	7	6	Uğur Taner	Turkey	55.31	
25	5	2	Nicholas Sanders	New Zealand	55.44	
26	5	5	Craig Jackson	South Africa	55.45	
26	6	3	Alexander Brandl	Austria	55.45	
28	6	5	Guy Callaghan	New Zealand	55.49	
29	9	8	Jaime Fernández	Spain	55.62	
30	5	8	Aldo Suurväli	Estonia	55.78	NR
31	5	7	Vesa Hanski	Finland	55.81	
32	4	8	Dragomir Markov	Bulgaria	55.85	NR
33	9	6	Artūrs Jakovļevs	Latvia	55.95	
34	5	4	Tomohiro Miyoshi	Japan	55.98	
35	6	2	Péter Horváth	Hungary	56.09	
36	4	5	Joseph Eric Buhain	Philippines	56.19	
37	5	3	Giovanni Linscheer	Suriname	56.20	
38	8	8	Can Ergenekan	Turkey	56.30	
39	4	3	Arthur Li Kai Yien	Hong Kong	56.47	
40	5	1	Marco Braida	Italy	56.50	
41	3	7	Simon Wainwright	Great Britain	56.53	
42	4	4	Matjaž Kozelj	Slovenia	56.65	
43	6	6	Kire Filipovski	Independent Olympic Participants	56.68	
44	1	1	Janko Gojković	Bosnia and Herzegovina	56.81	NR
45	4	7	Khristian Minkovski	Bulgaria	56.94	
46	4	6	Miguel Cabrita	Portugal	57.07	
47	6	7	Rudi Dollmayer	Sweden	57.27	
48	4	1	Duncan Todd	Hong Kong	57.29	
49	3	5	Patrick Sagisi	Guam	58.08	
50	3	3	Kristan Singleton	Virgin Islands	58.20	
51	3	7	Gary Tan	Singapore	58.21	
52	3	4	Musa Bakare	Nigeria	58.36	
53	3	1	Pedro Lima	Angola	58.37	
54	3	8	Leo Najera	Philippines	58.50	
55	5	6	Konrad Gałka	Poland	58.86	
56	2	7	Ian Steed Raynor	Bermuda	59.03	
57	2	2	Plutarco Castellanos	Honduras	59.68	
57	2	4	Gustavo Bucaro	Guatemala	59.68	
59	2	5	Timothy Eneas	Bahamas	1:00.11	
60	2	3	Jarrah Al-Asmawi	Kuwait	1:00.77	
61	2	8	Ziyad Kashmiri	Saudi Arabia	1:01.00	
62	1	3	Ray Flores	Guam	1:01.10	
63	2	6	Luis Héctor Medina	Bolivia	1:01.14	
64	1	5	Alan Espínola	Paraguay	1:01.38	
65	1	4	Julian Bolling	Sri Lanka	1:01.63	
66	1	2	Mohamed Khamis	United Arab Emirates	1:01.72	
67	1	6	Salvador Jiménez	Honduras	1:03.76	
68	1	7	Carl Probert	Fiji	1:04.10	
	1	1	Rhoderick McGown	Zimbabwe	DSQ	
	3	2	Ricardo Busquets	Puerto Rico	DNS	
	4	2	Tamás Vajda	Hungary	DNS	

=== Finals ===
==== Final B ====
Rank	Lane	Name	Nationality	Time	Notes
9	5	Christian Keller	Germany	54.30	
10	7	Jon Sieben	Australia	54.73	
11	4	Bruno Gutzeit	France	54.80	
12	8	José Carlos Souza	Brazil	54.85	
13	6	Jani Sievinen	Finland	54.93	
14	2	Martin Herrmann	Germany	54.94	
15	3	Shen Jianqiang	China	54.96	
16	1	Tom Ponting	Canada	55.00	

==== Final A ====
Rank	Lane	Name	Nationality	Time	Notes
1st place, gold medalist(s)	4	Pablo Morales	United States	53.32	
2nd place, silver medalist(s)	5	Rafał Szukała	Poland	53.35	NR
3rd place, bronze medalist(s)	3	Anthony Nesty	Suriname	53.41	
4	2	Pavlo Khnykin	Unified Team	53.81	
5	8	Melvin Stewart	United States	54.04	
6	6	Marcel Gery	Canada	54.18	
7	7	Martín López-Zubero	Spain	54.19	
8	1	Vladislav Kulikov	Unified Team	54.25	
