= Swimming at the 1991 Mediterranean Games =

- Location: Athens, Greece

The swimming events of the 1991 Mediterranean Games were held in Athens, Greece. It was a long course (50 metres) event.

== Medallists ==
=== Men's events ===
Event	Gold		Silver		Bronze	
50 m freestyle	René Gusperti (ITA)	23.57	Stavros Michaelides (CYP)	23.65	Giorgio Lamberti (ITA)	23.80
100 m freestyle	Christophe Kalfayan (FRA)	51.39	Adolfo Coll (ESP)	52.00	Denis Westrich (FRA)	52.45
200 m freestyle	Giorgio Lamberti (ITA)	1:49.34	Christophe Bordeau (FRA)	1:50.79	Daniel Serra (ESP)	1:51.95
400 m freestyle	Christophe Marchand (FRA)	3:59.29	Daniel Serra (ESP)	3:59.58	David Royo (ESP)	3:59.67
1500 m freestyle	Massimiliano Bensi (ITA)	15:43.46	David Royo (ESP)	15:48.20	Jean-Yves Faure (FRA)	15:52.37
100 m backstroke	Franck Schott (FRA)	57.22	Derya Büyükuncu (TUR)	57.76	Carlos Ventosa (ESP)	58.07
200 m backstroke	Eric Rebourg (FRA)	2:02.11	Stefano Battistelli (ITA)	2:02.33	Emanuele Mesiri (ITA)	2:03.27
100 m breaststroke	Cédric Pénicaud (FRA)	1:03.82	Christophe Bourdon (FRA)	1:04.08	Gianni Minervini (ITA)	1:04.94
200 m breaststroke	Cédric Pénicaud (FRA)	2:15.39	Christophe Bourdon (FRA)	2:16.49	Joaquín Fernández (ESP)	2:17.01
100 m butterfly	Hrvoje Barić (YUG)	54.96	Franck Esposito (FRA)	55.15	Leonardo Michelotti (ITA)	55.38
200 m butterfly	Christophe Bordeau (FRA)	2:01.44	Franck Esposito (FRA)	2:01.49	Marco Braida (ITA)	2:03.22
200 m individual medley	Frédéric Lefèvre (FRA)	2:06.29	Jorge Pérez (ESP)	2:07.50	Charalambos Papanikolaou (GRE)	2:07.94
400 m individual medley	Luca Sacchi (ITA)	4:23.37	Charalambos Papanikolaou (GRE)	4:28.77	Juliuo Rodriguez (ESP)	4:29.33
4 × 100 m freestyle	France; Christophe Kalfayan; Lionel Poirot; Denis Westrich; Frédéric Lefèvre	3:25.62	Italy; René Gusperti; Roberto Gleria; Emanuele Idini; Giorgio Lamberti	3:26.33	Spain; Carlos Ventosa; Adolfo Coll; José Hernando; Daniel Serra	3:28.08
4 × 200 m freestyle	Italy; Emanuele Idini; Roberto Gleria; Stefano Battistelli; Giorgio Lamberti	7:28.71	France; Christophe Bordeau; Lionel Poirot; Jean-Yves Faure; Christophe Marchand	7:30.85	Spain; Daniel Serra; Carlos Ventosa; Sergio Alvarez; Adolfo Coll	7:38.63
4 × 100 m medley	France; Franck Schott; Cédric Pénicaud; Franck Esposito; Christophe Kalfayan	3:46.03	Spain; Carlos Ventosa; Ramón Camallonga; Joaquín Fernández; Adolfo Coll	3:48.03	Italy; Roberto Cassio; Andrea Cecchi; Marco Braida; Antonio Consiglio	3:53.41

=== Women's events ===
Event	Gold		Silver		Bronze	
50 m freestyle	Kamoun Sophie (FRA)	26.96	Viviana Susin (ITA)	27.09	Senda Gharbi (TUN)	27.12
100 m freestyle	Senda Gharbi (TUN)	58.05	Sophie Kamoun (FRA)	58.18	Claudia Franco (ESP)	58.19
200 m freestyle	Tanja Vannini (ITA)	2:04.51	Manuela Melchiorri (ITA)	2:05.03	Antonia Machaira (GRE)	2:05.37
400 m freestyle	Cristiana Sossi (ITA)	4:15.10	Tanja Vannini (ITA)	4:24.12	Nesrin Ozgun (TUR)	4:25.21
800 m freestyle	Cristiana Sossi (ITA)	8:37.09	Manuela Melchiorri (ITA)	8:42.42	Anna Vinals (ESP)	9:01.84
100 m backstroke	Sabrina Cocchi (ITA)	1:05.16	Núria Castelló (ESP)	1:05.61	Darija Alauf (YUG)	1:05.68
200 m backstroke	Lorenza Vigarini (ITA)	2:14.81	Maria Carmen Marchena (FRA)	2:17.54	Darija Alauf (YUG)	2:18.34
100 m breaststroke	Manuela Dalla Valle (ITA)	1:12.00	Rocío Ruiz (ESP)	1:13.55	Lourdes Becerra (ESP)	1:14.21
200 m breaststroke	Manuela Dalla Valle (ITA)	2:33.12	Audrey Guérit (FRA)	2:35.19	Lourdes Becerra (ESP)	2:36.67
100 m butterfly	Cécile Jeanson (FRA)	1:02.53	Bárbara Franco (ESP)	1:03.42	María Luisa Fernández (ESP)	1:04.10
200 m butterfly	Elli Roussaki (GRE)	2:15.63	Ilaria Tocchin (ITA)	2:15.93	Bárbara Franco (ESP)	2:16.71
200 m individual medley	Céline Bonnet (FRA)	2:19.35	Silvia Parera (ESP)	2:21.15	Elisenda Pérez (ESP)	2:21.49
400 m individual medley	Elisenda Pérez (ESP)	4:52.59	Céline Bonnet (FRA)	4:55.40	Francesca Ferrarini (ITA)	4:55.48
4 × 100 m freestyle relay	France; Julia Reggiani; Sophie Kamoun; Thérèse Giuttet; Mylène Martin	3:52.56	Spain; Claudia Franco; Esther Martinez; Amala Carbayo; Natalia Pulido	3:54.05	Italy; Viviana Susin; Sabrina Cocchi; Tanja Vannini; Manuela Dalla Valle	3:58.05
4 × 100 m medley relay	Italy; Lorenza Vigarani; Elena Donati; Ilaria Tocchini; Nadia Pautasso	4:18.81	Spain; Núria Castelló; Rocío Ruiz; Bárbara Franco; Claudia Franco	4:20.49	France; Céline Bonnet; Virginie Bojaryn; Cécile Jeanson; Mylène Martin	4:23.05

== Medal table ==
Rank	Nation	Gold	Silver	Bronze	Total
1	France	14	9	3	26
2	Italy	13	7	8	28
3	Spain	1	12	14	27
4	Greece	1	1	2	4
5	Yugoslavia	1	0	2	3
6	Tunisia	1	0	1	2
7	Turkey	0	1	1	2
8	Cyprus	0	1	0	1
Totals (8 entries)		31	31	31	93
