= 1993 FINA World Swimming Championships (25 m) – Men's 200 metre backstroke =

These are the official results of the Men's 200 metres Backstroke event at the 1993 FINA Short Course World Championships which was held in Palma de Mallorca, Spain.

== Finals ==
RANK	FINAL A	TIME
	Tripp Schwenk (USA)	1:54.19
	Luca Bianchin (ITA)	1:55.09
	Stefaan Maene (BEL)	1:55.68
4.	Tino Weber (GER)	1:55.90
4.	Rogério Romero (BRA)	1:55.90
6.	Ryuji Horii (JPN)	1:56.20
7.	Adam Ruckwood (GBR)	1:56.91
8.	Craig Ford (NZL)	1:58.74

== Qualifying heats ==
RANK	HEATS RANKING	TIME
1.	Luca Bianchin (ITA)	1:56.16
2.	Tripp Schwenk (USA)	1:56.28
3.	Tino Weber (GER)	1:57.13
4.	Ryuji Horii (JPN)	1:57.23
5.	Rogério Romero (BRA)	1:57.35
6.	Stefaan Maene (BEL)	1:57.56
7.	Adam Ruckwood (GBR)	1:57.70
8.	Craig Ford (NZL)	1:58.01

== See also ==
- 1992 Men's Olympic Games 200m Backstroke
- 1993 Men's European LC Championships 200m Backstroke
