= Italy at the 1992 Summer Olympics =

- IOC code: ITA
- NOC: Italian National Olympic Committee

in Barcelona, Spain 25 July–9 August 1992
- Competitors: 304 (228 men, 76 women) in 26 sports
- Flag bearer: Giuseppe Abbagnale
- Medals Ranked 12th: Gold 6 Silver 5 Bronze 8 Total 19

Summer Olympics appearances (overview)
- 1896; 1900; 1904; 1908; 1912; 1920; 1924; 1928; 1932; 1936; 1948; 1952; 1956; 1960; 1964; 1968; 1972; 1976; 1980; 1984; 1988; 1992; 1996; 2000; 2004; 2008; 2012; 2016; 2020; 2024; 2028

Other related appearances
- 1906 Intercalated Games

Italy competed at the 1992 Summer Olympics in Barcelona, Spain. 304 competitors, 228 men and 76 women, took part in 169 events in 26 sports.

== Medalists ==
| Medal | Name | Sport | Event | Date |
|---|---|---|---|---|
| Gold | Giovanna Trillini | Fencing | Women's foil | 30 July |
| Gold | Giovanni Lombardi | Cycling | Men's points race | 31 July |
| Gold | Pierpaolo Ferrazzi | Canoeing | Men's slalom K-1 | 2 August |
| Gold | Fabio Casartelli | Cycling | Men's individual road race | 2 August |
| Gold | Diana Bianchedi; Francesca Bortolozzi; Giovanna Trillini; Dorina Vaccaroni; Margherita Zalaffi | Fencing | Women's team foil | 4 August |
| Gold | Italy men's national water polo team: Francesco Attolico; Alessandro Bovo; Paolo Caldarella; Sandro Campagna; Marco D'Altrui; Massimiliano Ferretti; Mario Fiorillo; Ferdinando Gandolfi; Amedeo Pomilio; Franco Porzio; Giuseppe Porzio; Carlo Silipo | Water polo | Men's tournament | 9 August |
| Silver | Flavio Anastasia; Luca Colombo; Gianfranco Contri; Andrea Peron | Cycling | Men's team time trial | 26 July |
| Silver | Vincenzo Maenza | Wrestling | Men's Greco-Roman 48 kg | 29 July |
| Silver | Emanuela Pierantozzi | Judo | Women's 66 kg | 29 July |
| Silver | Carmine Abbagnale; Giuseppe Abbagnale; Giuseppe Di Capua | Rowing | Men's coxed pair | 2 August |
| Silver | Marco Marin | Fencing | Men's sabre | 2 August |
| Bronze | Luca Sacchi | Swimming | Men's 400 metre individual medley | 27 July |
| Bronze | Bruno Rossetti | Shooting | Skeet | 28 July |
| Bronze | Stefano Battistelli | Swimming | Men's 200 metre backstroke | 28 July |
| Bronze | Roberto Bomprezzi; Carlo Massullo; Gianluca Tiberti | Modern pentathlon | Men's team | 29 July |
| Bronze | Giovanni De Benedictis | Athletics | Men's 20 kilometres walk | 31 July |
| Bronze | Alessandro Corona; Gianluca Farina; Rossano Galtarossa; Filippo Soffici | Rowing | Men's quadruple sculls | 2 August |
| Bronze | Marco Venturini | Shooting | Trap | 2 August |
| Bronze | Bruno Dreossi; Antonio Rossi | Canoeing | Men's K-2 500 metres | 7 August |

== Competitors ==
The following is the list of number of competitors in the Games.

| Sport | Men | Women | Total |
|---|---|---|---|
| Archery | 3 | 1 | 4 |
| Athletics | 25 | 14 | 39 |
| Baseball | 20 | – | 20 |
| Basketball | 0 | 12 | 12 |
| Boxing | 5 | – | 5 |
| Canoeing | 12 | 6 | 18 |
| Cycling | 14 | 4 | 18 |
| Diving | 2 | 1 | 3 |
| Equestrian | 8 | 4 | 12 |
| Fencing | 15 | 5 | 20 |
| Football | 16 | – | 16 |
| Gymnastics | 6 | 4 | 10 |
| Judo | 5 | 4 | 9 |
| Modern pentathlon | 3 | – | 3 |
| Rowing | 21 | 0 | 21 |
| Sailing | 10 | 4 | 14 |
| Shooting | 12 | 1 | 13 |
| Swimming | 15 | 9 | 24 |
| Synchronized swimming | – | 2 | 2 |
| Table tennis | 0 | 1 | 1 |
| Tennis | 4 | 4 | 8 |
| Volleyball | 12 | 0 | 12 |
| Water polo | 12 | – | 12 |
| Weightlifting | 3 | – | 3 |
| Wrestling | 5 | – | 5 |
| Total | 228 | 76 | 304 |

== Archery ==
In Italy's first archery competition without Giancarlo Ferrari, the four Italians went a combined 0-3 in the elimination round with Ilario Di Buò not even qualifying for the eliminations. The men's team also lost in the first round.

Women's Individual Competition:

- Maria Testa — Round of 32, 21st place (0-1)

Men's Individual Competition:

- Andrea Parenti — Round of 32, 19th place (0-1)
- Alessandro Rivolta — Round of 32, 22nd place (0-1)
- Ilario Di Buò — Ranking round, 39th place (0-0)

Men's Team Competition:

- Parenti, Rivolta, and di Buo — Round of 16, 14th place (0-1)

== Athletics ==
Men's 4 × 400 m Relay

- Alessandro Aimar, Marco Vaccari, Fabio Grossi, and Andrea Nuti

- Heat — 3:02.09
- Final — 3:02.18 (→ 6th place)

Men's 800 metres

- Andrea Benvenuti — 1:45.23 (→ 5th place)

Men's 5.000 metres

- Salvatore Antibo

- Heat — 13:33.71
- Final — 14:02.47 (→ 16th place)

Men's 10.000 metres

- Salvatore Antibo

- Heat — 28:18.48
- Final — 28:11.39 (→ 4th place)

- Francesco Bennici

- Heat — 28:45.62 (→ did not advance)

Men's Marathon

- Salvatore Bettiol — 2:14.15 (→ 5th place)
- Alessio Faustini — 2:21.37 (→ 44th place)
- Gelindo Bordin — did not finish (→ no ranking)

Men's 400m Hurdles

- Fabrizio Mori

- Heat — 49.16 (→ did not advance)

Men's 20 km Walk

- Giovanni De Benedictis — 1:23:11 (→ Bronze Medal)
- Maurizio Damilano — 1:23:39 (→ 4th place)
- Walter Arena — 1:29:34 (→ 18th place)

Men's 50 km Walk

- Giuseppe de Gaetano — 3:59:13 (→ 12th place)
- Massimo Quiriconi — 4:00:28 (→ 13th place)
- Giovanni Perricelli — did not finish (→ no ranking)

Men's Long Jump

- Giovanni Evangelisti

- Qualification — NM (→ did not advance)

Men's Hammer Throw

- Enrico Sgrulletti

- Qualification — 75.40 m
- Final — 72.98 m (→ 11th place)

Men's Pole Vault

- Andrea Pegoraro

- Qualification — 5.40 m (→ did not advance)

Men's Discus Throw

- Luciano Zerbini

- Qualification — NM (→ did not advance)

Men's Shot Put

- Luciano Zerbini

- Qualification — 20.25 m
- Final — 19.88 m (→ 9th place)

- Alessandro Andrei

- Qualification — 20.14 m
- Final — 19.62 m (→ 11th place)

Women's 800 metres

- Fabia Trabaldo

- Heat — 2:01.44 (→ did not advance)

Women's 10.000 metres

- Rosanna Munerotto

- Heat — 32:17.01
- Final — 32:37.91 (→ 16th place)

Women's 400m Hurdles

- Irmgard Trojer

- Heat — 55.49
- Semifinal — 56.34 (→ did not advance)

Women's Marathon

- Emma Scaunich — 2:46.14 (→ 18th place)
- Anna Villani — 2:46.44 (→ 20th place)
- Bettina Sabatini — 2:50.09 (→ 23rd place)

Women's Long Jump

- Valentina Uccheddu

- Heat — 6.40 m (→ did not advance)

- Antonella Capriotti

- Heat — 6.43 m (→ did not advance)

Women's 10 km Walk

- Annarita Sidoti

- Final — 45:23 (→ 7th place)

- Elisabetta Perrone

- Final — 46:43 (→ 19th place)

- Ileana Salvador

- Final — DSQ (→ no ranking)

Women's Discus Throw

- Agnese Maffeis

- Heat — 60.80m
- Final — 61.22m (→ 10th place)

Women's High Jump

- Antonella Bevilacqua

- Qualification — 1.90 m (→ did not advance)

== Baseball ==
Italy was not very successful at the premiere of Olympic baseball. The Italians lost six of their seven preliminary round games, beating only the host nation Spain. Their 1-6 record tied with that of Spain for seventh and eighth places, the Italians received the advantage in the tie-breaker because of the head-to-head result, barely avoiding last place.

Men's Team Competition:

- Italy - 7th place (1-6)

Team roster

- Massimo Ciaramella
- Guglielmo Trinci
- Claudio Cecconi
- Elio Gambuti
- Marco Urbani
- Maurizio De Sanctis
- Francesco Petruzzelli
- Fulvio Valle
- Massimiliano Masin
- Andrea Succi
- Claudio Taglienti
- Paolo Ceccaroli
- Ruggero Bagialemani
- Rolando Cretis
- Alberto d'Auria
- Roberto Bianchi
- Leonardo Scianchi
- Luigi Carrozza
- Massimo Fochi
- Massimo Melassi

== Basketball ==
=== Women's team competition ===
- Preliminary round (group A)

- Lost to Brazil (70-85)
- Lost to Unified Team (67-79)
- Lost to Cuba (53-60)

- Classification Matches

- 5th/8th place: Lost to Spain (80-92)
- 7th/8th place: Lost to Brazil (83-86) → 8th place

- Team roster

- Elena Paparazzo
- Monica Bastiani
- Mara Fullin
- Stefania Salvemini
- Anna Costalunga
- Francesca Rossi
- Angela Arcangeli
- Catarina Pollini
- Susanna Stanzani
- Silvia Todeschini
- Giuseppina Tufano
- Stefania Passaro

== Boxing ==
Men's Light Flyweight (– 48 kg)

- Luigi Castiglione

- First Round – Lost to Dong-Bum Cho (ITA), 2:8

== Canoeing ==
Men's K-4 1000 metres

- Matteo Bruscoli, Enrico Lupetti, Paolo Tommasini, Iduino Santoni (6th place in Semifinal 2)

== Cycling ==
Eighteen cyclists, fourteen men and four women, represented Italy in 1992.

Men's road race

- Fabio Casartelli
- Davide Rebellin
- Mirco Gualdi

Men's team time trial

- Flavio Anastasia
- Luca Colombo
- Gianfranco Contri
- Andrea Peron

Men's sprint

- Roberto Chiappa

Men's 1 km time trial

- Adler Capelli

Men's individual pursuit

- Ivan Beltrami

Men's team pursuit

- Ivan Beltrami
- Rossano Brasi
- Ivan Cerioli
- Fabrizio Trezzi
- Giovanni Lombardi

Men's points race

- Giovanni Lombardi

Women's road race

- Valeria Cappellotto — 2:05:03 (→ 17th place)
- Maria Turcutto — 2:05:03 (→ 32nd place)
- Roberta Bonanomi — 2:05:58 (→ 39th place)

Women's individual pursuit

- Gabriella Pregnolato

== Diving ==
Men's 3m Springboard

- Davide Lorenzini

- Preliminary Round — 375.57 points
- Final — 527.73 points (→ 12th place)

- Alessandro de Botton

- Preliminary Round — 312.69 points (→ did not advance, 28th place)

Men's 10m Platform

- Alessandro de Botton

- Preliminary Round — 334.98 (→ did not advance, 17th place)

Women's 3m Springboard

- Luisella Bisello

- Preliminary Round — 249.36 points (→ did not advance, 24th place)

Women's 10m Platform

- Luisella Bisello

- Preliminary Round — 272.19 points (→ 19th place)

== Fencing ==
20 fencers, 15 men and 5 women represented Italy in 1992.

Men's foil

- Andrea Borella
- Mauro Numa
- Stefano Cerioni

Men's team foil

- Marco Arpino, Andrea Borella, Stefano Cerioni, Mauro Numa, Alessandro Puccini

Men's épée

- Angelo Mazzoni
- Maurizio Randazzo
- Sandro Cuomo

Men's team épée

- Sandro Cuomo, Angelo Mazzoni, Stefano Pantano, Maurizio Randazzo, Sandro Resegotti

Men's sabre

- Marco Marin
- Giovanni Scalzo
- Ferdinando Meglio

Men's team sabre

- Marco Marin, Ferdinando Meglio, Giovanni Scalzo, Giovanni Sirovich, Tonhi Terenzi

Women's foil

- Giovanna Trillini
- Margherita Zalaffi
- Francesca Bortolozzi-Borella

Women's team foil

- Giovanna Trillini, Margherita Zalaffi, Francesca Bortolozzi-Borella, Diana Bianchedi, Dorina Vaccaroni

== Football ==
=== Men's team competition ===
- Preliminary round (group A)

- Defeated United States (2-1)
- Lost to Poland (0-3)
- Defeated Kuwait (1-0)

- Quarterfinals

- Lost to Spain (0-1) → Did not advance

- Team roster

- ( 1) Francesco Antonioli
- ( 2) Mauro Bonomi
- ( 3) Giuseppe Favalli
- ( 4) Luca Luzardi
- ( 5) Salvatore Matrecano
- ( 6) Alessandro Orlando
- ( 7) Stefano Rossini
- ( 8) Mirko Taccola
- ( 9) Rufo Verga
- (10) Demetrio Albertini
- (11) Dino Baggio
- (12) Angelo Peruzzi
- (13) Eugenio Corini
- (14) Dario Marcolin
- (15) Gianluca Sordo
- (16) Renato Buso
- (17) Pasquale Rocco
- (18) Marco Ferrante
- (19) Alessandro Melli
- (20) Roberto Muzzi

- Head coach: Cesare Maldini

== Judo ==
- Massimo Sulli

== Modern pentathlon ==
Three male pentathletes represented Italy in 1992. They won a bronze medal in the team event.

Individual

- Roberto Bomprezzi
- Carlo Massullo
- Gianluca Tiberti

Team

- Roberto Bomprezzi
- Carlo Massullo
- Gianluca Tiberti

== Sailing ==
Men's Sailboard (Lechner A-390)

- Riccardo Giordano

- Final Ranking — 182.1 points (→ 16th place)

Women's Sailboard (Lechner A-390)

- Alessandra Sensini

- Final Ranking — 101.4 points (→ 7th place)

Women's 470 Class

- Maria Quarra and Anna Maria Barabino

- Final Ranking — 68.7 points (→ 7th place)

== Swimming ==
Men's Competition

- René Gusperti, Giorgio Lamberti, Roberto Gleria, Massimo Trevisan, Piermaria Siciliano, Emanuele Merisi, Stefano Battistelli, Luca Bianchin, Gianni Minervini, Andrea Cecchi, Francesco Postiglione, Leonardo Michelotti, Marco Braida, Luca Sacchi, and Emanuele Idini

Men's 4 × 100 m Freestyle Relay

- Giorgio Lamberti, Emanuele Idini, Roberto Gleria, and Massimo Trevisan
  1. Heat – 3:23.43 (→ did not advance, 10th place)

Men's 4 × 200 m Freestyle

- Roberto Gleria, Emanuele Idini, Pier Maria Siciliano, and Stefano Battistelli
  1. Heat – 7:25.53
- Giorgio Lamberti, Massimo Trevisan, Roberto Gleria, and Stefano Battistelli
  1. Final – 7:18.10 (→ 5th place)

Women's Competition

- Cristina Chiuso, Ilaria Sciorelli, Manuela Melchiorri, Lorenza Vigarani, Lara Bianconi, Francesca Salvalajo, Manuela Dalla Valle, Elena Donati, and Ilaria Tocchini

== Synchronized swimming ==
Two synchronized swimmers represented Italy in 1992.

Women's solo

- Paola Celli
- Giovanna Burlando

Women's duet

- Paola Celli
- Giovanna Burlando

== Tennis ==
Men's Singles Competition

- Cristiano Caratti
  1. First round — Lost to Guy Forget (France) 3-6, 4-6, 2-6
- Omar Camporese
  1. First round — Defeated Juan Rios (Puerto Rico) 6-2, 6-2, 6-0
  2. Second round — Lost to Emilio Sánchez (Spain) 4-6, 2-6, 1-6
- Renzo Furlan
  1. First round — Defeated Shuzo Matsuoka (Japan) 6-4, 6-3, 3-6, 6-4
  2. Second round — Defeated Andrei Chesnokov (Unified Team) 7-6, 6-4, 6-4
  3. Third round — Lost to Jordi Arrese (Spain) 4-6, 3-6, 2-6

Men's Doubles Competition

- Omar Camporese and Diego Nargiso
  1. First round — Defeated Miguel Nido and Juan Rios (Puerto Rico) 6-1, 6-2, 6-3
  2. Second round — Lost to George Cosac and Dinu Pescariu (Romania) 1-6, 6-4, 6-4, 4-6, 2-6

Women's Singles Competition

- Katia Piccolini
  1. First Round – Lost to Nicole Provis (Australia) 1-6 0-6
- Raffaella Reggi-Concato
  1. First Round – Defeated Jenny Byrne (Australia) 6-4 7-6
  2. Second Round – Lost to Manuela Maleeva (Switzerland) 2-6 4-6
- Sandra Cecchini
  1. First Round – Defeated Paulina Sepúlveda (Chile) 6-2 6-3
  2. Second Round – Lost to Conchita Martínez (Spain) 4-6 3-6

== Volleyball ==
=== Men's team competition ===
- Team roster

- Lorenzo Bernardi
- Marco Bracci
- Luca Cantagalli
- Claudio Marco Galli
- Andrea Gardini
- Andrea Giani
- Andrea Lucchetta
- Roberto Masciarelli
- Michele Pasinato
- Paolo Tofoli
- Fabio Vullo
- Andrea Zorzi

== Water polo ==
=== Men's team competition ===
- Preliminary round (group B)

- Italy – Hungary 7-7
- Italy – Netherlands 6-4
- Italy – Cuba 11-8
- Italy – Spain 9-9
- Italy – Greece 8-6

- Semi Finals

- Italy – Commonwealth of Independent States 9-8

- Final

- Italy – Spain 9-8 (→ Gold Medal)

- Team roster

- Carlo Silipo
- Amedeo Pomilio
- Franco Porzio
- Pino Porzio
- Mario Fiorillo
- Ferdinando Gandolfi
- Alessandro Campagna
- Marco D'Altrui
- Massimiliano Ferretti
- Francesco Attolico
- Alessandro Bovo
- Paolo Caldarella
