= Suriname at the 1996 Summer Olympics =

- IOC code: SUR
- NOC: Suriname Olympic Committee

in Atlanta
- Competitors: 7 (5 men and 2 women) in 3 sports
- Flag bearer: Enrico Linscheer
- Medals: Gold 0 Silver 0 Bronze 0 Total 0

Summer Olympics appearances (overview)
- 1960; 1964; 1968; 1972; 1976; 1980; 1984; 1988; 1992; 1996; 2000; 2004; 2008; 2012; 2016; 2020; 2024; 2028

Suriname competed at the 1996 Summer Olympics in Atlanta, United States, from 19 July to 4 August 1996. It was the nation's eighth appearance at the Summer Olympics, since its debut at the 1960 Summer Olympics in Rome. The Surinamese delegation consisted of seven athletes competing in three sports. Suriname did not win any medals at the Games.

== Background ==
The Suriname Olympic Committee was founded in 1956 and was recognized by the International Olympic Committee (IOC) in 1959. The nation made its Olympic debut at the 1960 Summer Olympics in Rome, and has competed in every Summer Olympics since then except in 1964 and 1980. The 1996 Summer Olympics marked the country's ninth appearance at the Summer Olympics.

The 1996 Summer Olympics were held in Atlanta, United States, from 19 July to 4 August 1996. Swimmer Enrico Linscheer was the flagbearer for Suriname during the opening ceremony. Suriname did not win a medal at the Games.

== Competitors ==
The Suriname delegation consisted of seven athletes (five men and two women) competing in three sports.

Sport	Men	Women	Total
Athletics	1	1	2
Badminton	1	0	1
Swimming	3	1	4
Total	5	2	7

== Athletics ==
Two Surinamese athletes qualified for the Games. Tommy Asinga competed in the men's 800 m and Letitia Vriesde in the women's 800 m. Vriesde was an Olympic veteran, having competed in every Olympics since the 1988 Summer Olympics, and was making her third Olympic appearance. She had won several medals including a silver at the 1995 World Athletics Championships and a bronze at the 2001 World Athletics Championships in the 800 metres event. She had also won a gold, a silver, and a bronze in the Pan American Games and five golds, and a silver in the Central American and Caribbean Games. She holds a personal best time of 1:56.68 in the 800 metres, set on 13 August 1995, which is ranked amongst the top hundred times for women. This was Asinga's first and only Olympic appearance. Asinga is a bronze medalist from the 1991 Pan American Games in the men's 800 metres.

The athletics events were held at the Centennial Olympic Stadium, Atlanta, Georgia. The preliminary heats for the men's 800 metres event was held on 28 August 1996. Asinga set a time of 1 minute and 48.29 seconds, and finished seventh in the first heat. He was ranked 27th overall amongst the 56 participants and did not advance to the semifinal.

In the women's 800 metres, held on 26 to 29 August 1996, Vriesde competed in heat one of the first round. She finished second in the heat and ninth overall with a time of 1:59.71 and advanced to the next round. In the semifinals, she crossed the line in fifth place in the second race, and did not advance further.

Athlete	Event	Heat		Semifinal		Final	
Athlete	Event	Result	Rank	Result	Rank	Result	Rank
Tommy Asinga	Men's 800 m	1:48.29	7	Did not advance			
Letitia Vriesde	Women's 800 m	1:59.71	2 Q	1:58.29	5	Did not advance	

- Ranks indicate placing in the individual heats.

== Badminton ==
Suriname qualified one badminton player, Oscar Brandon, for the men's singles event.

Brandon was born on 8 August 1971 and is the first person from Suriname to take part in Olympic badminton. He had achieved his career best singles ranking of 61 in 1991. The badminton events were held at Georgia State University Sports Arena in Atlanta from 24 July to 1 August 1996. Brandon was drawn alongside Jaimie Dawson of Canada in the first round. He lost his sole match to Dawson 5–15, 4–15 and was eliminated from the competition.

Athlete	Event	First Round	Second Round	Third Round	Quarterfinal	Semifinal	Final / BM	
Athlete	Event	Opposition Score	Opposition Score	Opposition Score	Opposition Score	Opposition Score	Opposition Score	Rank
Oscar Brandon	Men's singles	Jaimie Dawson (CAN); L 5-15, 4-15	Did not advance					

== Swimming ==
Suriname entered four swimmers for the Games. In the men's category, Mike Fung A Wing competed in the men's 100 m backstroke, and brothers Enrico and Giovanni Linscheer competed in men's 50 m freestyle and two events respectively Carolyn Adel competed in four events including the women's 200 m and 400 m individual medley, and women's 200 m and 400 m freestyle events.

This was the first Olympic appearance for both Fung a Wing and Adel. This was the second consecutive Olympic appearance for the Linsheer siblings after their debut at the 1992 Summer Olympics. The swimming events were held at the Georgia Tech Aquatic Center in Atlanta.

Men

In the men's 100 metres backstroke preliminary heat held on 23 July 1996, Fung A Wing competed in Heat 2. He finished seventh in his heat with a time of 1:01.24, and was ranked 47th amongst the 59 competitors. He did not advance to the semi-finals. In the 50 metres freestyle event, Enrico Linsheer was ranked 32nd out of the 64 participants after the initial heats, and did not advance further. Meanwhile, Giovanni registered 40th and 42nd place finishes in the 100 metres butterfly and freestyle events respectively, and did not proceed to the further rounds either.

Athlete	Event	Heat		Semifinal		Final	
Athlete	Event	Time	Rank	Time	Rank	Time	Rank
Mike Fung-A-Wing	100 m backstroke	1:01.24	47	Did not advance			
Enrico Linscheer	50 m freestyle	23.45	32	Did not advance			
Giovanni Linscheer	100 m freestyle	51.82	42	Did not advance			
Giovanni Linscheer	100 m butterfly	56.09	40	Did not advance			

Women

In the women's events, Adel did not progress past the initial rounds in any of the four events, and registered a best place finish of 22nd in the 400 metre individual medley event.

Athlete	Event	Heat		Semifinal		Final	
Athlete	Event	Time	Rank	Time	Rank	Time	Rank
Carolyn Adel	200 m freestyle	2:05.04	28	Did not advance			
Carolyn Adel	400 m freestyle	4:22.66	30	Did not advance			
Carolyn Adel	200 m individual medley	2:21.54	31	Did not advance			
Carolyn Adel	400 m individual medley	4:55.48	22	Did not advance			
