= 1993 FINA World Swimming Championships (25 m) – Men's 100 metre butterfly =

These are the official results of the Men's 100 metres Butterfly event at the 1993 FINA Short Course World Championships held in Palma de Mallorca, Spain.

== Finals ==
RANK	FINAL A	TIME
	Miloš Milošević (CRO)	52.79
	Mark Henderson (USA)	52.92
	Rafał Szukała (POL)	52.94
4.	Vladislav Kulikov (RUS)	52.97
5.	Lars Frölander (SWE)	53.03
6.	Brian Alderman (USA)	53.28
7.	Christian Keller (GER)	53.36
8.	Jaime Fernandez (ESP)	53.92

== Qualifying heats ==
RANK	HEATS RANKING	TIME
1.	Miloš Milošević (CRO)	52.95
2.	Lars Frölander (SWE)	53.37
3.	Christian Keller (GER)	53.47
4.	Rafał Szukała (POL)	53.57
5.	Vladislav Kulikov (RUS)	53.59
6.	Mark Henderson (USA)	53.60
7.	Brian Alderman (USA)	53.81
8.	Jaime Fernandez (ESP)	54.18

== See also ==
- 1992 Men's Olympic Games 100m Butterfly
- 1993 Men's European LC Championships 100m Butterfly
