= Stéphane Vossart =

French swimmer

Personal information
- Born: June 27, 1972 (age 54) Croix, Nord, France

Sport
- Sport: Swimming

Stéphane Vossart (born 27 June 1972) is a retired male breaststroke swimmer from France, who represented his native country at the 1992 Summer Olympics. His best result in three starts in Barcelona, Spain was 5th place (3:40.51) in the Men's 4×100 metres Medley Relay event, alongside Franck Schott, Bruno Gutzeit and Stéphan Caron.
