= Ujčić =

Ujčić is a surname. Notable people with the surname include:

- Gabrijela Ujčić (born 1976), Croatian swimmer
- Josip Ujčić (1880–1964), Croatian prelate
