= Norway at the 1992 Summer Olympics =

- IOC code: NOR
- NOC: Norwegian Olympic Committee

in Barcelona
- Competitors: 83 (51 men and 32 women) in 17 sports
- Flag bearer: Jorunn Horgen (sailing)
- Medals Ranked 22nd: Gold 2 Silver 4 Bronze 1 Total 7

Summer Olympics appearances (overview)
- 1900; ~~1904~~; 1908; 1912; 1920; 1924; 1928; 1932; 1936; 1948; 1952; 1956; 1960; 1964; 1968; 1972; 1976; 1980; 1984; 1988; 1992; 1996; 2000; 2004; 2008; 2012; 2016; 2020; 2024; 2028

Other related appearances
- 1906 Intercalated Games

Norway was represented at the 1992 Summer Olympics in Barcelona by the Norwegian Olympic Committee and Confederation of Sports. 83 competitors, 51 men and 32 women, took part in 64 events in 17 sports.

== Medalists ==
Medal	Name	Sport	Event	Date
Gold	Jon Rønningen	Wrestling	Men's Greco-Roman 52 kg	28 July
Gold	Linda Andersen	Sailing	Europe	3 August
Silver	Harald Stenvaag	Shooting	Men's 50 metre rifle prone	29 July
Silver	Lars Bjønness; Per Sætersdal; Rolf Thorsen; Kjetil Undset	Rowing	Men's quadruple sculls	2 August
Silver	Knut Holmann	Canoeing	Men's K-1 1000 metres	8 August
Silver	Norway women's national handball team: Mona Dahle; Kristine Duvholt Havnas; Siri Eftedal; Hege Frøseth; Susann Goksør; Henriette Henriksen; Hanne Hogness; Karin Pettersen; Tonje Sagstuen; Annette Skotvoll; Ingrid Steen; Heidi Sundal; Cathrine Svendsen; Heidi Tjugum	Handball	Women's tournament	8 August
Bronze	Knut Holmann	Canoeing	Men's K-1 500 metres	7 August

== Competitors ==
The following is the list of number of competitors in the Games.

Sport	Men	Women	Total
Archery	1	0	1
Athletics	6	3	9
Badminton	1	0	1
Boxing	1	–	1
Canoeing	3	4	7
Cycling	6	3	9
Diving	1	0	1
Equestrian	1	0	1
Gymnastics	0	1	1
Handball	0	14	14
Judo	1	0	1
Rowing	6	0	6
Sailing	10	4	14
Shooting	5	2	7
Swimming	6	1	7
Tennis	2	0	2
Wrestling	2	–	2
Total	52	32	84

== Archery ==
In the fourth appearance by the nation in the archery competition at the Olympics, Norway was again represented by only one man. He came within three points of defeating the eventual gold medallist in the semifinal, but was defeated there and again in the bronze medal match to come home with a certificate of merit rather than a medal.

Men's Individual Competition:

- Martinus Grov — Bronze Medal Match, 4th place (3–2)

== Athletics ==
Men's 800 metres

- Atle Douglas

- Heat – 1:48.08
- Semi final – 1:48.63 (→ did not advance)

- Vebjørn Rodal

- Heat – 1:48.00
- Semi final – 1:49.53 (→ did not advance)

Men's 10,000 metres

- John Halvorsen

- Heat – 28:21.57
- Final – 29:53.91 (→ 19th place)

Men's High Jump

- Steinar Hoen

- Qualifying Heat — 2.23m (→ did not advance)

- Håkon Särnblom

- Qualifying Heat — 2.20m (→ did not advance)

Men's Discus Throw

- Olav Jenssen

- Qualifying Heat — 60.00m (→ did not advance)

Women's Discus Throw

- Mette Bergmann

- Qualifying Heat — 58.32m (→ did not advance)

Women's Javelin Throw

- Trine Hattestad

- Round 1 — 67.20 metres
- Final — 63.54 metres (→ 5th place)

Women's Heptathlon

- Anne Brit Skjæveland

== Cycling ==
Nine cyclists, six men and three women, represented Norway in 1992.

Men's road race

- Bjørn Stenersen
- Lars Kristian Johnsen
- Karsten Stenersen

Men's team time trial

- Stig Kristiansen
- Roar Skaane
- Bjørn Stenersen
- Karsten Stenersen

Men's individual pursuit

- Steffen Kjærgaard

Women's road race

- Monica Valvik — 2:05:03 (→ 5th place)
- Gunhild Ørn — 2:05:46 (→ 37th place)
- Ingunn Bollerud

== Diving ==
Men's 3m Springboard

- Christian Styren

- Preliminary Round — 347.94 points (→ did not advance, 19th place)

== Handball ==
=== Women's team competition ===
- Preliminary round (group B)

- Norway – South Korea 16–27
- Norway – Spain 20–16
- Norway – Austria 19–17

- Semifinals

- Norway – Unified Team 23–20

- Gold Medal Match

- Norway – South Korea 21-28 (→ Silver Medal)

- Team roster

- Cathrine Svendsen
- Heidi Tjugum
- Annette Skotvoll
- Ingrid Steen
- Heidi Sundal
- Hanne Hogness
- Karin Pettersen
- Tonje Sagstuen
- Hege Frøseth
- Susann Goksør
- Henriette Henriksen
- Mona Dahle
- Kristine Duvholt
- Siri Eftedal

- Head coach: Sven-Tore Jacobsen

== Judo ==
Men's Half-Lightweight

- Stig Traavik

== Sailing ==
Men's Sailboard (Lechner A-390)

- Per Haugen

- Final Ranking — 233.0 points (→ 22nd place)

Men's 470 Class

- Herman Johannessen and Pal McCarthy

- Final Ranking — 71.7 points (→ 5th place)

Women's Sailboard (Lechner A-390)

- Jorunn Horgen

- Final Ranking — 102.7 points (→ 8th place)

Women's 470 Class

- Ida Andersen and Tonje Kristiansen

- Final Ranking — 100 points (→ 14th place)

== Swimming ==
Men's 100m Freestyle

- Jarl Inge Melberg

- Heat – 51.39 (→ did not advance, 28th place)

Men's 200m Freestyle

- Jarl Inge Melberg

- Heat – 1:50.70 (→ did not advance, 19th place)

Men's 400m Freestyle

- Jarl Inge Melberg

- Heat – 4:03.49 (→ did not advance, 38th place)

Men's 100m Backstroke

- Thomas Holmen Sopp

- Heat – 58.45 (→ did not advance, 39th place)

Men's 200m Backstroke

- Thomas Holmen Sopp

- Heat – 2:05.91 (→ did not advance, 31st place)

Men's 100m Breaststroke

- Børge Mørk

- Heat – 1:05.47 (→ did not advance, 37th place)

Men's 200m Breaststroke

- Børge Mørk

- Heat – 2:19.11 (→ did not advance, 26th place)

Men's 4 × 200 m Freestyle Relay

- Jarl Inge Melberg, Thomas Holmen Sopp, Trond Høines, and Kjell Ivar Lundemoen

- Heat – 7:31.35 (→ did not advance, 14th place)

Men's 4 × 100 m Medley Relay

- Thomas Holmen Sopp, Børge Mørk, Trond Høines, and Jarl Inge Melberg

- Heat – 3:52.42 (→ did not advance, 17th place)

Women's 200m Freestyle

- Irene Dalby

- Heat – 2:04.28 (→ did not advance, 23rd place)

Women's 400m Freestyle

- Irene Dalby

- Heat – 4:16.05
- B-Final – 4:14.46 (→ 11th place)

Women's 800m Freestyle

- Irene Dalby

- Heat – 8:38.58
- Final – 8:37.12 (→ 5th place)

== Tennis ==
Men's Singles Competition

- Christian Ruud

- First round — Lost to Boris Becker (Germany) 6-3, 6-7, 7-5, 6-7, 3–6

Men's Doubles Competition

- Bent-Ove Pedersen and Christian Ruud

- First round — Lost to Wayne Ferreira and Piet Norval (South Africa) 2-6, 4-6, 7-5, 3–6

== Wrestling ==
Men's Greco-Roman Light-Flyweight

- Lars Rønningen

Men's Greco-Roman Flyweight

- Jon Rønningen
