= Marcos Prono =

Paraguayan swimmer

Personal information
- Full name: Marcos Andrés Prono Toñánez
- Born: 16 May 1975 (age 51)

Sport
- Sport: Swimming

Marcos Prono (born 16 May 1975) is a Paraguayan former swimmer. He competed in the men's 100 metre backstroke and men's 200 metre backstroke events at the 1992 Summer Olympics held in Barcelona, Spain.
