= Rocío Ruiz (swimmer) =

Spanish swimmer (born 1971)

Personal information
- Born: 26 November 1971 (age 54)

Sport
- Sport: Swimming
- Strokes: Breaststroke
Medal record
Representing Spain
Mediterranean Games
Silver medal – second place	1991 Athens	100m breaststroke
Silver medal – second place	1991 Athens	4x100m medley relay

Rocío Ruiz (born 26 November 1971) is a Spanish breaststroke swimmer. She competed in two events at the 1992 Summer Olympics.
