= Núria Castelló =

Spanish swimmer

Personal information
- Born: April 26, 1971 (age 55)

Sport
- Sport: Swimming
- Strokes: Backstroke
Medal record
Representing Spain
Mediterranean Games
Silver medal – second place	1991 Athens	100m backstroke
Silver medal – second place	1991 Athens	4x100m medley relay

Núria Castelló (born 26 April 1971) is a Spanish backstroke swimmer who competed in the 1992 Summer Olympics.
