= Salvador Jiménez =

Honduran swimmer (born 1973)

Personal information
- Full name: Salvador Enrique Jiménez Medina
- Born: 26 December 1973 (age 52)

Sport
- Sport: Swimming

Salvador Enrique Jiménez Medina (born 26 December 1973) is a Honduran swimmer. As a swimmer, he represented Honduras in international competition. He represented Honduras at the 1992 Summer Olympics in three events, the men's 100 metre butterfly, men's 100 metre backstroke, and men's 200 metre backstroke. Though, he failed to make it past the qualifying heats of all of the events he had entered in.

== Biography ==
Salvador Enrique Jiménez Medina was born on 26 December 1973. As a swimmer, he represented Honduras in international competition.

Jiménez was selected to compete for Honduras at the 1992 Summer Olympics held in Barcelona, Spain. For the 1992 Summer Games, he was entered in three events: the men's 100 metre butterfly, men's 100 metre backstroke, and men's 200 metre backstroke. He first competed in the qualifying heats of the men's 100 metre butterfly on 27 July 1992 in the first heat against eight other swimmers. There, he recorded a time of 1:03.76 and placed seventh, failing to advance further to the finals as only the top 16 ranked swimmers in the heats would only be able to do so. He then competed in the qualifying heats of the men's 200 metre backstroke the following day in the first heat against six other competitors. There, he recorded a time of 2:20.15 and placed fourth, failing to advance further to the finals. His last event was the men's 100 metre backstroke. He competed in the qualifying heats of the event two days later in the first heat against four other swimmers. There, he recorded a time of 1:04.60 and placed second, but failed again to advance to the finals of the event.
