= Hrvoje Barić =

Croatian swimmer (born 1965)

Personal information
- Born: July 21, 1965 (age 60) Split, Yugoslavia

Sport
- Sport: Swimming
Medal record
Representing Yugoslavia
Mediterranean Games
Gold medal – first place	1991 Athens	100m butterfly

Hrvoje Barić (born 21 July 1965) is a Croatian former swimmer who competed in the 100 m butterfly event of the 1984 Summer Olympics, where he was eliminated in the heats. He placed 6th in the same event at the 1989 European Aquatics Championships.
