= André Gusperti =

Italian swimmer

Personal information
- Born: October 14, 1973 (age 52) Schlanders, Italy

Sport
- Sport: Swimming
- Strokes: Butterfly
Medal record
Representing Italy
Mediterranean Games
Gold medal – first place	1997 Bari	4x100 m medley relay

André Gusperti (born 14 October 1973) is an Italian former swimmer. He was a world class butterfly swimmer during the 1990s.

== Biography ==
He began swimming in Rari Nantes Trento and later joined Fiamme Gialle (the Athletic Team of Guardia di Finanza). During the nineties Gusperti competed in several international events. He swam in the winning 4 × 100 m medley relay at the 1997 Mediterranean Games (Merisi, Fioravanti, A. Gusperti, Rosolino). He participated to the world swimming championship in Perth 1998. He is the brother of René Gusperti, another renowned former Italian swimmer.
