= Julie Blaise =

French swimmer

Personal information
- Born: November 8, 1975 (age 50) Antibes, France

Sport
- Sport: Swimming
Medal record
Representing France
Mediterranean Games
Gold medal – first place	1993 Mende	50m freestyle
Bronze medal – third place	1993 Mende	100m freestyle

Julie Blaise (born 8 November 1975) is a French former freestyle swimmer who competed in the 1992 Summer Olympics.
