= Miloš Milošević =

Croatian swimmer (born 1972)

Personal information
- Nationality: Croatia
- Born: 10 May 1972 (age 54) Split, SR Croatia, SFR Yugoslavia

Sport
- Sport: Swimming
- Strokes: Butterfly
Medal record
Men's swimming
Representing Croatia
World Championships (SC)
Gold medal – first place	1993 Palma	100 m butterfly
European Championships (LC)
Silver medal – second place	1999 Istanbul	50 m butterfly
Bronze medal – third place	1993 Sheffield	100 m butterfly
European Championships (SC)
Gold medal – first place	1998 Sheffield	50 m butterfly
Gold medal – first place	1999 Lisbon	50 m butterfly
Silver medal – second place	1996 Rostock	4×50 m freestyle
Silver medal – second place	2002 Riesa	50 m butterfly
Bronze medal – third place	1992 Espoo	50 m butterfly
Bronze medal – third place	1993 Gateshead	4×50 m freestyle
Mediterranean Games
Gold medal – first place	1993 Narbonne	100 m butterfly
Silver medal – second place	2001 Tunis	4×100 m medley

Miloš ("Mićo") Milošević (born May 10, 1972) is a swimmer from Croatia. He specialized in the butterfly stroke, but also competed in freestyle and backstroke.

Miloš Milošević was born in Split to a family of ethnic Serb. In 1980, he began swimming lessons with the "Mornar" swimming club, continuing for four years. At the age of 14, he began competing in youth swimming competitions of SFR Yugoslavia, winning eight gold medals as a junior.

He later moved to Rijeka, to the swimming club "Primorje". As a person of Serb descent, he faced considerable difficulty trying to compete for Croatia during the Croatian War of Independence. He missed the 1992 Summer Olympics in Barcelona, but his talent eventually secured him a place on the national swimming team. He competed in the 1996 Summer Olympics and the 2000 Summer Olympics.

Milošević won his first major award at the 1992 European Championship with a bronze in the 50 meter butterfly event. At the 1993 World Championship he won gold in the 100 meters butterfly race. The same year, he won bronze at the 1993 European Championship. In the 1994 World Championships, he finished fifth in that event.

His best result occurred at the 1998 European Championship where he won gold in the 50 meters butterfly and broke the world record with a time of 23.30 seconds. At the European Short Course Swimming Championships 1999, he also won gold in the same event, and silver at the European LC Championships 1999.

At the European Short Course Swimming Championships 2002, he won silver in the 50 meter butterfly. He retired from professional swimming in 2004. His personal best in the 50 meter butterfly event was 23.30 seconds (1998), and 52.24 seconds in the 100 meter butterfly (1998).

He is currently the full-time head coach at a swim club in Regensburg.
