= Matthew O'Connor (swimmer) =

British swimmer (born 1971)

Personal information
- Full name: Matthew Daniel O'Connor
- National team: Great Britain
- Born: 26 February 1971 (age 55) North Walsham, England
- Height: 6 ft 2 in (1.88 m)
- Weight: 207 lb (94 kg)

Sport
- Sport: Swimming
- Strokes: Backstroke
- Club: City of Leeds Swimming Club
- College team: University of Georgia (US)

Matthew Daniel O'Connor (born 26 February 1971) is male British former competitive swimmer.

== Swimming career ==
O'Connor competed in the 1992 Summer Olympics in Barcelona, and finished 32nd overall after swimming in the preliminary heats of the men's 200-metre backstroke. He represented England in the 100 metres and 200 metres backstroke, at the 1990 Commonwealth Games in Auckland, New Zealand. Four years later he represented England again in the same events at the 1994 Commonwealth Games.

O'Connor set the British national record in the 200-meter backstroke with a time of 2:02.88. At the British National meet he placed second in both the 100 meter and 200 meter backstroke events. While competing collegiately at the University of Georgia (UGA) from 1991 to 1994, O'Connor set the Georgia Bulldogs swimming and diving team record at the time in the 200-yard backstroke (1:47.43).

== See also ==
- List of University of Georgia people
