= José Mossiane =

Mozambican swimmer

Personal information
- Born: 6 November 1970 (age 54)

Sport
- Sport: Swimming

José Moises Mossiane (born 6 November 1970) is a Mozambican former swimmer. He competed in the men's 50 metre freestyle event at the 1992 Summer Olympics.
