= José Hernando =

Spanish swimmer

Personal information
- Born: April 30, 1968 (age 58)

Sport
- Sport: Swimming
Medal record
Representing Spain
Mediterranean Games
Bronze medal – third place	1991 Athens	4x100m freestyle relay

José Hernando (born 30 April 1968) is a Spanish former swimmer who competed in the 1988 Summer Olympics.
