= Simon Percy =

New Zealand swimmer (born 1971)

Personal information
- National team: New Zealand
- Born: 2 July 1971 (age 55) Chatham, England

Sport
- Sport: Swimming
- Strokes: Backstroke Individual medley

Simon Percy (born 2 July 1971) is a New Zealand swimmer. He competed in the 1990 Commonwealth Games, 1991 World Champs and the 1992 Summer Olympics.

== Swimming Career ==
Percy represented New Zealand at the 1990 Commonwealth Games held in Auckland where he finished 5th in the 100 metre backstroke in a time of 57.89 behind compatriot Paul Kingsman who finished 3rd, and winner Mark Tawksbury from Canada.

Following the Commonwealth Games, Percy swum for Arizona State University under Ron Johnson during which time he earned All-American status in 1993 and 1994 in the 200 metre backstroke and 200 metre individual medley graduating in 1994 with a Bachelor of Science.

In 1991, Percy raced at the World Championships in Perth with a 4th place finish in the consolation final in the 100 metre backstroke in a time of 57.52, and a 17th place finish in the heats of the 200 metre backstroke in a time of 2:05.04. Percy was also part of the 4x100 metre freestyle and 4x200 metre freestyle relays.

Later in the year, Percy made three finals at the 1991 Pan-Pacific Championships in Edmonton, finishing 4th in the 100 metre backstroke in a time of 57.19, 7th in the 200 metre individual medlay in a time of 2:06.13, and 8th in the 200 metre backstroke in a time of 2:05.27.

At the 1992 Summer Olympics in Barcelona, Percy finished 28th in the 200 metre backstroke in a time of 2:05.53, 28th in the 200 metre individual medley in a time of 2:06.76 and 33rd in the 100 metre backstroke in a time of 57.96.

== Coaching career ==
After retiring from swimming, Percy returned to ASU as an assistant coach.
