= Elisenda Pérez =

Spanish swimmer

Personal information
- Born: January 28, 1975 (age 51)

Sport
- Sport: Swimming
Medal record
Representing Spain
Mediterranean Games
Gold medal – first place	1991 Athens	400m individual medley
Bronze medal – third place	1991 Athens	200m individual medley

Elisenda Pérez (born 28 January 1975) is a Spanish former medley swimmer who competed in the 1992 Summer Olympics.
