= Frank Leskaj =

Albanian swimmer

Personal information
- Nationality: American, Albanian
- Born: April 16, 1971 (age 55) Philadelphia, Pennsylvania, U.S.
- Height: 1.90 m (6 ft 3 in)

Sport
- Sport: Swimming
- Strokes: Breaststroke, freestyle
- College team: La Salle University

Frank Leskaj (born April 16, 1971) is an American swimmer who competed for Albania in the 50-meter freestyle, 100-meter freestyle, and the 100-meter breaststroke at the 1992 Summer Olympics. Leskaj was the first Albanian swimmer to compete in the Olympics.

== Results ==
Events	Heat		Finals	
Events	Time	Rank	Time	Rank
50 meter freestyle	24.72	50	Did not advance	
100 meter freestyle	55.50	62	Did not advance	
100 meter breaststroke	1:14.28	56	Did not advance	

== Personal life ==
His uncle was former Chicago Cubs and Philadelphia Phillies manager Lee Elia.
