= Christophe Bourdon =

French swimmer

Personal information
- Born: 13 March 1970 (age 56) Versailles, France

Sport
- Sport: Swimming
Medal record
Representing France
Mediterranean Games
Silver medal – second place	1987 Latakia	200m breaststroke
Silver medal – second place	1991 Athens	100m freestyle
Silver medal – second place	1991 Athens	100m breaststroke
Silver medal – second place	1991 Athens	200m breaststroke
Silver medal – second place	1991 Athens	4x200m freestyle relay

Christophe Bourdon (born 13 March 1970) is a French breaststroke swimmer. He competed in two events at the 1992 Summer Olympics.
