= Alessandro De Botton =

Italian diver (born 1970)

Personal information
- Nationality: Italian
- Born: 15 October 1970 (age 54); Rome, Italy

Sport
- Sport: Diving

Alessandro De Botton (born 15 October 1970) is an Italian diver. He competed in two events at the 1992 Summer Olympics.
