= Frédéric Lefèvre =

French swimmer (born 1970)

Personal information
- Born: April 23, 1970 (age 56)

Sport
- Sport: Swimming
Medal record
Representing France
Mediterranean Games
Gold medal – first place	1991 Athens	200m individual medley
Gold medal – first place	1991 Athens	4x100m freestyle relay

Frédéric Lefèvre (born 23 April 1970) is a French former swimmer who competed in the 1992 Summer Olympics and in the 1996 Summer Olympics.
