= Paola Celli =

Italian synchronized swimmer

Personal information
- Nationality: Italy
- Born: 23 August 1967 (age 58) Rome, Italy
- Height: 1.68 m (5 ft 6 in)
- Weight: 58 kg (128 lb)

Sport
- Sport: Swimming
- Strokes: Synchronized swimming
- Club: Roma 70
- Updated on 21 May 2015

Paola Celli (born 23 August 1967) is an Italian former synchronized swimmer who competed in the 1992 and 1996 Summer Olympics.
