= Ilaria Sciorelli =

Italian swimmer

Personal information
- Born: 19 February 1974 (age 52) Turin, Italy

Sport
- Sport: Swimming

Ilaria Sciorelli (born 19 February 1974) is an Italian swimmer. She competed in two events at the 1992 Summer Olympics.
