= Bjørn Stenersen =

Norwegian cyclist

Personal information
- Born: 9 February 1970 Bergen, Norway
- Died: 16 September 1998 (aged 28) Trondheim, Norway
- Height: 1.78 m (5 ft 10 in)
- Weight: 70 kg (154 lb)

Cycling career
- Sport: Cycling
- Discipline: Road
- Role: Rider

Professional team
- 1992–1995: Motorola

Bjørn Stenersen (9 February 1970 – 16 September 1998) was a Norwegian professional racing cyclist.

He won the Norwegian National Road Race Championship in 1990. He also competed in two events at the 1992 Summer Olympics, placing eleventh in the team time trial.

He was the brother of Karsten Stenersen.

== Major results ==
1987
1st Time trial, National Junior Road Championships
1988
1st Time trial, National Junior Road Championships
1989
1st Time trial, National Road Championships
1990
1st Road race, National Road Championships
2nd Overall Rheinland-Pfalz-Rundfahrt
3rd Grand Prix de France
8th Overall Tour of Norway
1991
1st Time trial, National Road Championships
2nd Overall Tour of Norway

1st Stages 2 & 6

2nd Grand Prix de la Ville de Lillers
3rd Team time trial, UCI Road World Championships
1992
1st Time trial, National Road Championships
2nd Overall Tour of Norway

1st Stage 5

1993
6th Grand Prix Impanis-Van Petegem
8th Paris–Bourges
1997
6th Grand Prix Herning
