= Krzysztof Cwalina =

Polish swimmer

Personal information
- Full name: Krzysztof Cwalina
- Nationality: Poland
- Born: 5 February 1971 (age 55) Wrocław, Dolnośląskie
- Height: 1.86 m (6 ft 1 in)
- Weight: 75 kg (165 lb)

Sport
- Sport: Swimming
- Strokes: Freestyle
- Club: AZS-AWF Wrocław
Medal record
Men's swimming
Representing Poland
European Championships (SC)
Gold medal – first place	1994 Stavanger	50 m freestyle

Krzysztof Cwalina (born 5 February 1971 in Wrocław, Dolnośląskie) is a retired freestyle swimmer from Poland. He competed for his native country at the 1992 Summer Olympics in Barcelona, Spain, finishing in eighteenth place in the men's 50 m freestyle event (23.20).

Cwalina graduated with a B.S. and an M.S. in computer science from the University of Iowa. As of 2012 he is a program manager on the Common Language Runtime team at Microsoft Corporation. He and Brad Abrams coauthored Framework Design Guidelines (Addison-Wesley, 2005; 2nd 2008, ISBN 978-0321545619), winner of a Jolt Award in 2006.

His son, Alan, is a professional League of Legends esports player under the name Busio.
