= Gabrijela Ujčić =

Croatian swimmer (born 1976)

Personal information
- Born: October 2, 1976 (age 49) Rijeka, Yugoslavia

Sport
- Sport: Swimming
Medal record
Representing Croatia
Mediterranean Games
Bronze medal – third place	1993 Mende	4x100m medley relay

Gabrijela Ujčić (born 2 October 1976) is a Croatian former swimmer.

== Career ==
Ujčić swam for Primorje swimming club in Rijeka where she was born. She won a bronze medal in the 4 × 100 m relay at the 1993 Mediterranean Games. She competed at the 1996 Summer Olympic Games finishing 46th in the women's 50 metre freestyle, 45th in the women's 100 metre freestyle and 42nd in the women's 100 metre butterfly.

== Personal life ==
Her niece Ana Herceg also has swum for Croatia.
