= Natalia Pulido =

Spanish swimmer

Personal information
- Born: December 17, 1969 (age 56)

Sport
- Sport: Swimming
Medal record
Representing Spain
Mediterranean Games
Silver medal – second place	1991 Athens	4x100m freestyle relay

Natalia Pulido (born 17 December 1969) is a Spanish swimmer who competed in the 1992 Summer Olympics. She attended the University of Nevada, Reno and was a member of the swimming & diving team.
