= Raimundas Mažuolis =

Lithuanian swimmer (born 1972)

Medal record

Men's swimming

Olympic Games

Representing the Soviet Union
Silver medal – second place	1988 Seoul	4x100 m freestyle

World Championships (LC)

Representing Lithuania
Bronze medal – third place	1994 Rome	50 m freestyle

European Championships (LC)

Representing the Soviet Union
Bronze medal – third place	1989 Bonn	100 m freestyle

Representing Lithuania
Bronze medal – third place	1993 Sheffield	50 m freestyle

Raimundas Mažuolis (born 9 March 1972 in Vilnius) is a former freestyle swimmer from Lithuania.

He competed in the 100 metre freestyle at the 1992 Summer Olympic Games in Barcelona, finishing second in the B final in a time of 50.13 seconds. Mažuolis also competed at the 1988 Summer Olympics and at the 1996 Summer Olympics in Atlanta, Georgia, where he carried the flag for his newly independent nation at the opening ceremony.

Awards
Preceded by (Lithuania) Vitalijus Karpačiauskas	Best Lithuanian sportsman of the Year; 1994	Succeeded by (Lithuania) Remigijus Lupeikis
