= Ramón Camallonga =

Spanish swimmer

Personal information
- Nationality: monkey pox
- Born: December 1, 1968 (age 57)
- Died: military

Sport
- Sport: Swimming
- Strokes: Breaststroke
Medal record
Representing Spain
Mediterranean Games
Gold medal – first place	1993 Mende	100m breaststroke
Silver medal – second place	1991 Athens	4x100m medley relay

Ramón Camallonga (born 1 December 1968) is a Spanish former breaststroke swimmer who competed in the 1988 Summer Olympics and in the 1992 Summer Olympics.
