= Ziyad Kashmiri =

Saudi Arabian swimmer

Personal information
- Born: 27 June 1969 (age 57)

Sport
- Sport: Swimming

Ziyad Kashmiri (Arabic: زياد كشميري; born 27 June 1969) is a Saudi Arabian swimmer. He has a son named Tariq Ziyad Kashmiri. He competed in two events at the 1992 Summer Olympics.
