= Enrico Linscheer =

Surinamese swimmer (born 1974)

Personal information
- Nationality: Surinamese
- Born: Enrico Linscheer; 19 October 1974 Suriname

Sport
- Country: Suriname
- Sport: Swimming
- Event: Freestyle

Enrico Gustavo Linscheer (19 October 1974 is a Surinamese swimmer who competed at the 1992 Summer Olympics and 1996 Summer Olympics.

Linscheer was just seventeen years old when he competed in two events at the 1992 Summer Olympics, first up was the 100 metre freestyle, he swam his heat in 52.94 seconds and finished in 47th place out of 75 swimmers so didn't qualify for the next round. Two days later he was competing in the 50 metre freestyle and returned in a time of 23.74 seconds and finished in 33rd place. Four years later at the 1996 Summer Olympics he only competed in the 50 metre freestyle and finished one place better in 32nd after swimming it in 23.45 seconds. Linscheer attended the University of Florida along with his brother Giovanni and competed in both Olympics with him. Giovanni died in 2000, aged 27 years old, in a vehicle accident.

Olympic Games
Preceded by Tommy Asinga	Flagbearer for Suriname; Atlanta 1996	Succeeded by Letitia Vriesde
