= Karsten Stenersen =

Norwegian cyclist

Personal information
- Born: 24 September 1971 (age 55) Bergen, Norway

Cycling career
- Sport: Cycling

Karsten Stenersen (born 24 September 1971) is a Norwegian former cyclist. He competed in two events at the 1992 Summer Olympics, placing eleventh in the time trial. He is the brother of Bjørn Stenersen.
