= Lara Bianconi =

Italian swimmer

Personal information
- Born: 9 May 1974 (age 52)

Sport
- Sport: Swimming

Lara Bianconi (born 9 May 1974) is an Italian backstroke and medley swimmer. She competed in two events at the 1992 Summer Olympics.
