= Francesca Salvalajo =

Italian swimmer (born 1972)

Personal information
- Born: 20 July 1972 (age 53) Mirano, Italy

Sport
- Sport: Swimming
- Strokes: Backstroke
Medal record
Women's swimming
Representing Italy
Mediterranean Games
Gold medal – first place	1993 Narbonne	100 m backstroke
Gold medal – first place	1993 Narbonne	200 m backstroke

Francesca Salvalajo (born 20 July 1972) is a retired backstroke swimmer from Italy. She represented her native country at the 1992 Summer Olympics in Barcelona, Spain. Salvalajo is a two-time gold medalist at the Mediterranean Games.
