= Julia Reggiani =

French swimmer

Personal information
- Born: 22 April 1970 (age 56)

Sport
- Sport: Swimming
Medal record
Representing France
Mediterranean Games
Gold medal – first place	1991 Athens	4x100m freestyle relay

Julia Reggiany (born 22 April 1970) is a French former freestyle swimmer who competed in the 1992 Summer Olympics.
