= Christophe Marchand =

French swimmer

Personal information
- Full name: Christophe Marchand
- Nationality: French
- Born: 6 August 1970 (age 56) Villeparisis, Seine-et-Marne
- Height: 1.85 m (6 ft 1 in)

Sport
- Sport: Swimming
- Strokes: Freestyle
- Club: Villeparisis N Racing Club de France
Medal record
European Championships (LC)
Bronze medal – third place	1993 Sheffield	4×200 m freestyle
Mediterranean Games
Gold medal – first place	1991 Athens	400 m freestyle
Gold medal – first place	1993 Narbonne	400 m freestyle

Christophe Marchand (born 6 August 1970 in Villeparisis, Seine-et-Marne) is a retired freestyle swimmer from France. He competed at two consecutive Summer Olympics for his native country, starting in 1988. He twice claimed the gold medal at the Mediterranean Games in the men's 400 metres freestyle event.

He is the older brother of Xavier Marchand, brother-in-law of Céline Bonnet, and uncle of Léon Marchand.
