= Ryuji Horii =

Japanese swimmer (born 1974)

Personal information
- Full name: Ryuji Horii
- Nationality: Japan
- Born: November 25, 1974 (age 51) Osaka, Japan
- Height: 1.75 m (5 ft 9 in)
- Weight: 68 kg (150 lb)

Sport
- Sport: Swimming
- Strokes: Backstroke
Medal record
Men's Swimming
Representing Japan
Pan Pacific Championships
Bronze medal – third place	1995 Atlanta	200 m backstroke
Asian Games
Bronze medal – third place	1994 Hiroshima	200 m backstroke
Summer Universiade
Silver medal – second place	1995 Fukuoka	200m Backstroke

Ryuji Horii (堀井 利有司, Horii Ryuji; born November 25, 1974 in Osaka, Japan) is a retired Japanese male backstroke swimmer.

== Career ==
Horii is best known for winning a silver medal at the 1995 Summer Universiade in Fukuoka.

He won a bronze in the 1994 Asian games in Hiroshima, and another at the 1995 Pan Pacific championships in Atlanta.

=== Olympics ===
Horii represented Japan at the 1996 Summer Olympics in Atlanta, Georgia.
