= Céline Bonnet =

French swimmer

Personal information
- Nationality: France
- Born: February 2, 1976 (age 50)

Sport
- Sport: Swimming
- Strokes: Backstroke, medley
Medal record
Representing France
Mediterranean Games
Gold medal – first place	1991 Athens	200m individual medley
Silver medal – second place	1991 Athens	400m individual medley
Bronze medal – third place	1991 Athens	4x100m medley relay

Céline Bonnet (born 2 February 1976) is a former French backstroke and medley swimmer who competed in the 1992 Summer Olympics. She is married to former French olympic swimmer Xavier Marchand. Their eldest son, Léon Marchand, is a four-time Olympic gold medalist.
