= Olivér Ágh =

Hungarian swimmer

Personal information
- Nationality: Hungarian
- Born: 20 March 1975 (age 51) Dunaújváros, Fejér
- Height: 1.88 m (6 ft 2 in)
- Weight: 78 kg (172 lb)

Sport
- Sport: Swimming
- Strokes: Backstroke
- College team: Florida Atlantic University
- Club: Budapesti Honvéd Sportegyesület; Csik Ferenc Diáksport

Olivér Ágh (born 20 March 1975 in Dunaújváros, Fejér) is a retired male backstroke swimmer from Hungary, who competed in two consecutive Summer Olympics for his native country, in 1992 and 1996.

Results:

- 1991 Junior European Championships, Antwerp: 2nd - 200m Backstroke
- 1992 Olympics, Barcelona: 27th - 200m Backstroke
- 1994 World Championships, Rome: 15th - 200m Backstroke
- 1996 Olympics, Atlanta: 12th - 200m Backstroke
- 1996 NCAA Division 1 Championships: 13th - 200 Backstroke
- 1997 World university Games, Sicily: 7th - 200 Backstroke
- 1999 World University Games, Palma de Mallorca: 7th - 200 Backstroke
