= René Gusperti =

Italian swimmer (born 1971)

Personal information
- Born: 18 March 1971 (age 55)
Medal record
Men's swimming
Representing Italy
European Championships (SC)
Silver medal – second place	1996 Rostock	50 m freestyle
Silver medal – second place	1996 Rostock	4×50 m medley
Mediterranean Games
Gold medal – first place	1991 Athens	50 m freestyle
Silver medal – second place	1991 Athens	4×100 m freestyle
Silver medal – second place	1993 Sheffield	50 m freestyle
Bronze medal – third place	1993 Sheffield	4×100 m freestyle

René ("Spillo") Gusperti (born 18 March 1971) is an Italian former swimmer. He was a world class freestyle sprinter during the 1990s and unchallenged Italian Champion in the same years.

== Biography ==
Gusperti was born in Schlanders/Silandro. He began swimming in Rari Nantes Trento, there he met his long-lasting coach Walter Bolognani, current head-coach of the Italian Junior National Team. He later joined Fiamme Gialle (the Athletic Team of Guardia di Finanza) and won his first Italian Championship in 1991, from then on ten years of nearly uninterrupted victories follows. During the nineties Gusperti competed in all the major international events, including 1992 and 1996 Summer Olympics. In 2005 he joined CSI Trento Nuoto where he still swim -as of 2007- and coaches. He is the brother of André Gusperti, another renowned former Italian swimmer.

== Major achievements ==
=== Personal Bests ===
Time	Distance	Event	Course	Venue	Date
22.77	50 m	Freestyle	Long	Wien	28 August 1995
22.29	50 m	Freestyle	Short	Salò	8 April 2004
49.59	100 m	Freestyle	Short	Camogli	18 December 2003

=== International ===
Year	Meet	Venue	Distance	Event	Result
1987	European Youth Championships	Rome, Italy	50 m	Freestyle	3rd
1991	Mediterranean Games	Athens, Greece	50 m	Freestyle	1st
1991	Mediterranean Games	Athens, Greece	4 × 100 m	Freestyle	2nd
1993	Mediterranean Games	Languedoc-Roussillon, France	50 m	Freestyle	2nd
1993	Mediterranean Games	Languedoc-Roussillon, France	4 × 100 m	Freestyle	3rd
1996	European Championships	Riesa, Germany	50 m	Freestyle	2nd
1996	European Championships	Riesa, Germany	4×50 m	Medley	2nd

=== Italian Championships ===
Year	Meet	Venue	Distance	Event	Result
1991	Summer	Pesaro	50 m	Freestyle	1st
1992	Spring	Florence	50 m	Freestyle	1st
1992	Spring	Florence	4 × 100 m	Freestyle	1st
1992	Summer	Pesaro	50 m	Freestyle	1st
1992	Summer	Pesaro	4 × 100 m	Freestyle	1st
1993	Spring	Florence	50 m	Freestyle	1st
1993	Spring	Florence	4 × 100 m	Freestyle	1st
1993	Summer	Rome	50 m	Freestyle	1st
1993	Summer	Roma	4 × 100 m	Freestyle	1st
1994	Spring	Florence	50 m	Freestyle	1st
1994	Spring	Florence	4 × 100 m	Freestyle	1st
1994	Summer	Riccione	50 m	Freestyle	1st
1995	Spring	Florence	50 m	Freestyle	1st
1995	Summer	San Donato Milanese	50 m	Freestyle	1st
1995	Summer	San Donato Milanese	4 × 100 m	Freestyle	1st
1993	Spring	Livorno	50 m	Freestyle	1st
1993	Spring	Livorno	4 × 100 m	Freestyle	1st
1993	Summer	Catania	50 m	Freestyle	1st
1993	Summer	Catania	4 × 100 m	Freestyle	1st
1997	Spring	Livorno	50 m	Freestyle	1st
1997	Summer	San Donato Milanese	50 m	Freestyle	3rd
1997	Summer	San Donato Milanese	4 × 100 m	Medley	2nd
1998	Winter	Desenzano	50 m	Freestyle	1st
1998	Spring	Livorno	4 × 100 m	Freestyle	1st
1998	Spring	Livorno	4 × 100 m	Medley	1st
1998	Summer	Bari	4 × 100 m	Freestyle	1st
1999	Spring	Genoa	4 × 100 m	Freestyle	1st
1999	Summer	Asti	4 × 100 m	Freestyle	1st
2000	Winter	Desenzano	4×50 m	Freestyle	1st
2000	Winter	Desenzano	50 m	Freestyle	1st
2000	Summer	Monfalcone	4 × 100 m	Freestyle	1st
2001	Winter	Imperia	4×50 m	Freestyle	1st
2001	Spring	Imperia	4 × 100 m	Freestyle	1st
2001	Summer	Genoa	50 m	Freestyle	1st
2002	Winter	Camogli	4×50 m	Freestyle	2nd
2002	Winter	Camogli	50 m	Freestyle	3rd
2002	Spring	Brescia	4 × 100 m	Freestyle	2nd
2002	Spring	Brescia	50 m	Freestyle	2nd
2002	Summer	Gubbio	50 m	Freestyle	3rd
2003	Summer	Riccione	50 m	Freestyle	3rd
2004	Summer	Pesaro	4 × 100 m	Freestyle	3rd

=== Other international participations ===
- Summer Olympic Games: Barcelona 1992, Atlanta 1996.
- World Long Course Championships: Rome 1994.
- World Short Course Championships: Rio de Janeiro 1995, Gothenburg 1997.
- European Long Course Championships: Athens 1991, Sheffield 1993, Vienna 1995, Seville 1997, Istanbul 1999.
- European Short Course Championships: Gelsenkirchen 1991, Espoo 1992, Gateshead 1993, Riesa 1996.
- Mediterranean Games: Athens 1991, Languedoc-Roussillon 1993, Bari 1997.
