= Mohamed El-Azoul =

Egyptian swimmer

Personal information
- Born: 7 January 1966 (age 60)

Sport
- Sport: Swimming

Mohamed El-Azoul (born 7 January 1966) is an Egyptian former swimmer. He competed at the 1988 Summer Olympics and the 1992 Summer Olympics.
