= Rastislav Bizub =

Czech swimmer

Personal information
- Born: 12 September 1972 (age 53) Martin, Czechoslovakia
- Children: Viktorie Bizubová, Daniel Bizub

Sport
- Sport: Swimming

Rastislav Bizub (born 12 September 1972) is a Czech swimmer. He competed at the 1992 Summer Olympics and the 1996 Summer Olympics.
