= Miguel Arrobas =

Portuguese swimmer

Personal information
- Born: 30 September 1974 (age 51) Alvalade, Lisbon. Portugal

Sport
- Sport: Swimming

Miguel Arrobas (born 30 September 1974) is a Portuguese backstroke swimmer and politician. He competed in two events at the 1992 Summer Olympics.

A member of the CDS – People's Party, he became a member of the Assembly of the Republic in October 2021 following the resignation of Ana Rita Bessa.
