= Raymond Brown (swimmer) =

Canadian swimmer

Personal information
- Full name: Raymond Brown
- National team: Canada
- Born: May 6, 1969 (age 57) Cambridge, Ontario
- Height: 1.90 m (6 ft 3 in)
- Weight: 84 kg (185 lb)

Sport
- Sport: Swimming
- Strokes: Backstroke, medley
Medal record
Men's swimming
Representing Canada
Pan Pacific Championships
Bronze medal – third place	1989 Tokyo	400 m medley
Pan American Games
Bronze medal – third place	1987 Indianapolis	200 m backstroke
Bronze medal – third place	1987 Indianapolis	4x100 m medley

Raymond Brown (born May 6, 1969) is a former backstroke swimmer from Canada.

Brown competed for his native country at the 1992 Summer Olympics in Barcelona, Spain. There he finished in 18th position in the 100-metre backstroke, and in 15th place in the 200-metre backstroke.

He currently is a financial advisor in Cleveland, Ohio.
