= Ivor Le Roux =

Zimbabwean swimmer (born 1976)

Personal information
- Born: 23 February 1976 (age 50)

Sport
- Sport: Swimming

Ivor Le Roux (born 23 February 1976) is a Zimbabwean freestyle swimmer. He competed in three events at the 1992 Summer Olympics.
