= David Holderbach =

French swimmer

Personal information
- Born: 19 February 1971 (age 55) Valence, Drôme, France

Sport
- Sport: Swimming
- Strokes: backstroke

David Holderbach (born 19 February 1971) is a French former backstroke swimmer. He competed at the 1988 Summer Olympics and the 1992 Summer Olympics.
