= Børge Mørk =

Norwegian swimmer

Personal information
- Born: 19 August 1971 (age 54) Narvik, Norway

Sport
- Sport: Swimming

Børge Mørk (born 19 August 1971) is a Norwegian breaststroke swimmer. He was born in Narvik. He competed at the 1992 Summer Olympics in Barcelona, and at the 1996 Summer Olympics in Atlanta. He won a total of 38 gold medals at the Norwegian championships.
