= Foy Gordon Chung =

Fijian swimmer

Personal information
- Born: 10 October 1975 (age 50)

Sport
- Sport: Swimming

Foy Gordon Chung (born 10 October 1975) is a Fijian former swimmer. He competed in four events at the 1992 Summer Olympics.
