= Ivan Roberts =

Seychellois swimmer (born 1973)

Personal information
- Born: 20 May 1973 (age 53)

Sport
- Sport: Swimming

Ivan Roberts (born 20 May 1973) is a Seychellois swimmer. At the 1992 Summer Olympics, He competed in two events, the men's 50 metres and 100 metres freestyle, ranking 58 and 67 respectively.
