= Marcel Blažo =

Slovak swimmer (born 1974)

Personal information
- Born: 8 January 1974 (age 52) Bratislava, Czechoslovakia

Sport
- Sport: Swimming

Marcel Blažo (born 8 January 1974) is a Slovak swimmer. He competed in two events at the 1992 Summer Olympics.
