= Carlos Ventosa =

Spanish swimmer

Personal information
- Full name: Carlos Ventosa Delmas
- Born: 4 March 1971 (age 55) Barcelona, Spain
Medal record
Men's swimming
Representing Spain
World Championships (SC)
Silver medal – second place	1993 Palma	4×100 m medley
Mediterranean Games
Silver medal – second place	1991 Athens	4×100 m medley
Silver medal – second place	1993 Narbonne	200 m freestyle
Silver medal – second place	1993 Narbonne	4×100 m freestyle
Silver medal – second place	1993 Narbonne	4×100 m medley
Bronze medal – third place	1991 Athens	100 m backstroke
Bronze medal – third place	1991 Athens	4×100 m freestyle
Bronze medal – third place	1991 Athens	4×200 m freestyle
Bronze medal – third place	1993 Narbonne	100 m backstroke
Bronze medal – third place	1993 Narbonne	4×200 m freestyle

Carlos Ventosa Delmas (Note: In this Spanish name, the first or paternal surname is Ventosa and the second or maternal family name is Delmas.) (born 4 March 1971) is a former backstroke swimmer from Spain, who competed at the 1992 Summer Olympics for his native country. He is best known for winning the silver medal in the Men's 4 × 100 m Medley Relay at the 1993 FINA Short Course World Championships, alongside Sergio López Miró, Joaquín Fernández and José Maria Rojano.
