= Trond Høines =

Norwegian swimmer

Personal information
- Nationality: Norwegian
- Born: 10 September 1970 (age 54); Stavanger

Sport
- Country: Norway
- Sport: Swimming

Trond Høines (born 10 September 1970) is a Norwegian freestyle swimmer. He was born in Stavanger. He competed at the 1992 Summer Olympics in Barcelona.
