= Daniel Serra (swimmer) =

Spanish swimmer

Personal information
- Born: 2 April 1968 (age 58) Barcelona, Spain

Sport
- Sport: Swimming
Medal record
Representing Spain
Mediterranean Games
Bronze medal – third place	1987 Latakia	200m freestyle

Daniel Serra (born 2 April 1968) is a Spanish freestyle swimmer. He competed in two events at the 1988 Summer Olympics.
