= Cédric Pénicaud =

French swimmer

Personal information
- Born: 27 September 1971 (age 54) Limoges, France
Medal record
Men's swimming
Representing France
European Championships (LC)
Silver medal – second place	1989 Bonn	4×100 m medley
Silver medal – second place	1991 Athens	4×100 m medley
Mediterranean Games
Gold medal – first place	1991 Athens	100 m breaststroke
Gold medal – first place	1991 Athens	200 m breaststroke
Gold medal – first place	1993 Narbonne	100 m breaststroke

Cédric Pénicaud (born 27 September 1971 in Limoges) is a retired breaststroke swimmer from France, who represented his country at the 1988 Summer Olympics in Seoul, South Korea. He won a silver medal at the 1991 European Long Course Championships in Athens, Greece, as a member of the French relay team in the men's 4 × 100 m medley.
