= Stéphan Caron =

French swimmer (born 1966)

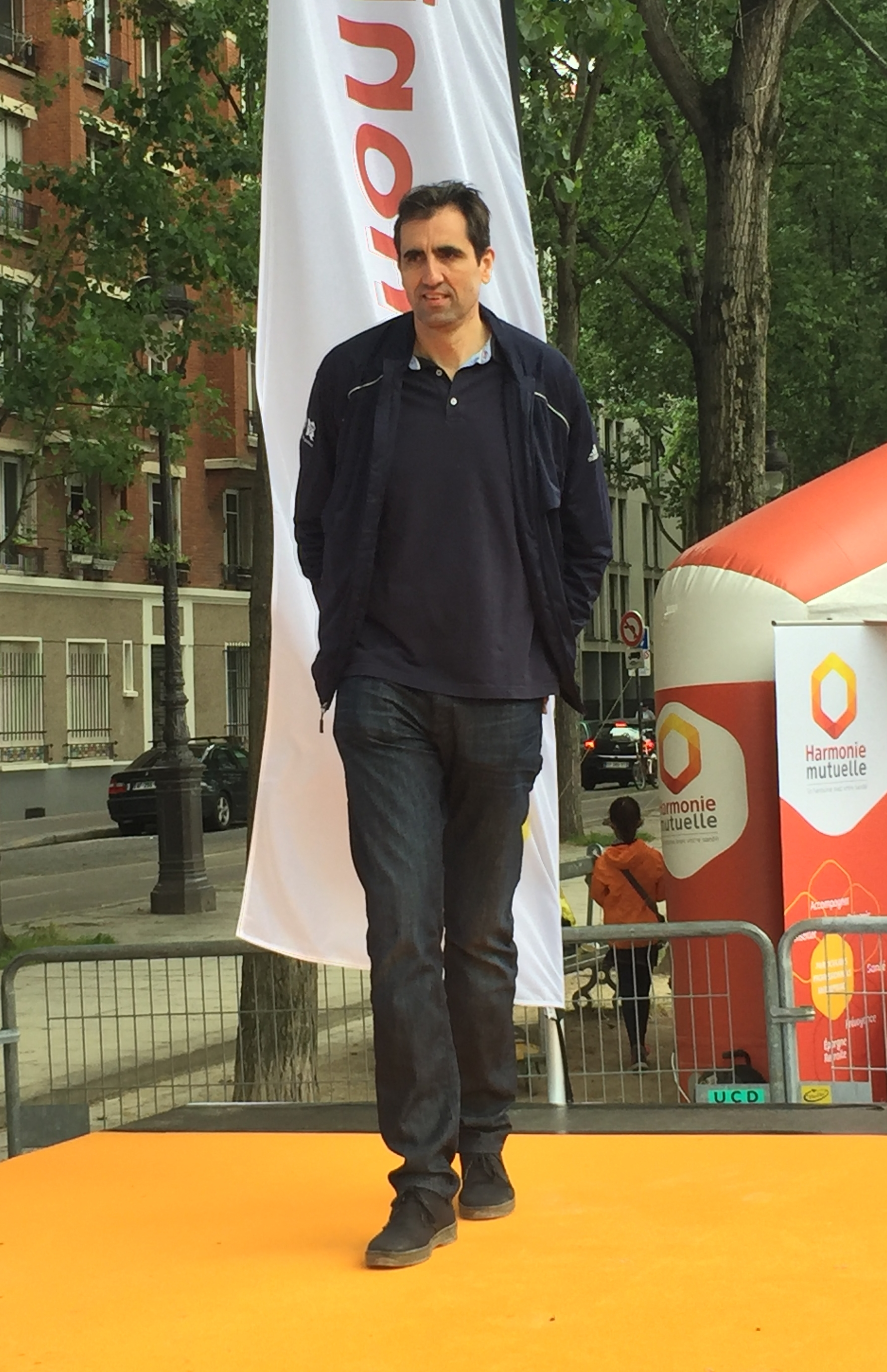
- Stephan Caron in 2016

Personal information
- Born: 1 July 1966 (age 59) Rouen, Seine-Maritime, France
Medal record
Men's swimming
Representing France
Olympic Games
Bronze medal – third place	1988 Seoul	100 m freestyle
Bronze medal – third place	1992 Barcelona	100 m freestyle
World Championships (LC)
Silver medal – second place	1986 Madrid	100 m freestyle
European Championships (LC)
Gold medal – first place	1985 Sofia	100 m freestyle
Silver medal – second place	1987 Strasbourg	100 m freestyle
Silver medal – second place	1989 Bonn	4×100 m freestyle
Silver medal – second place	1989 Bonn	4×100 m medley
Summer Universiade
Gold medal – first place	1991 Sheffield	50 m freestyle
Gold medal – first place	1991 Sheffield	100 m freestyle
Gold medal – first place	1991 Sheffield	200 m freestyle
Silver medal – second place	1985 Kobe	100 m freestyle
Silver medal – second place	1985 Kobe	200 m freestyle

Stephan Caron (born 1 July 1966 in Rouen, Seine-Maritime) is a former freestyle swimmer from France.

Caron won the bronze medal in the men's 100 m freestyle at the Summer Olympics twice in a row, starting in 1988. In 1985, he won the European title in the 100 m freestyle.
