= Giovanni Linscheer =

Surinamese swimmer

Personal information
- Birth name: Giovanni Rodolfo Linscheer
- Nationality: Surinamese
- Born: 18 November 1972; Suriname
- Died: 19 March 2000 (aged 27); Boca Raton, Florida, United States

Sport
- Country: Suriname
- Sport: Swimming
- Event: Butterfly / Freestyle

Giovanni Rodolfo Linscheer (18 November 1972 - 19 March 2000) was a Surinamese swimmer who competed at the 1992 Summer Olympics and 1996 Summer Olympics.

Linscheer held the national 50m freestyle record for 12-years until it was beaten by Renzo Tjon-A-Joe in 2013.

His younger brother Enrico Linscheer also represented Suriname in swimming at the same two Olympics. Both Linscheer and his brother were educated in the United States, at The Bolles School in Jacksonville, then the University of Florida.

== Career ==
At the 1991 Pan American Games he was a finalist in the 100 metres for the butterfly and freestyle, the two events he competed in at Olympic level.

His first appearance at the Olympics came at Barcelona in 1992, at the age of 19. In the 100 metres freestyle he was fifth in his heat with a time of 51.82, which placed him 37th overall. He was also 37th overall in the 100 metres butterfly, sixth in his heat with 56.20. Countryman Anthony Nesty won the bronze medal in that event.

He earned All-American honours while swimming for the Florida Gators in 1993-94, with a top eight finish in the 400-yard relay at the NCAA Championships. In 1994 he graduated from the University of Florida with an engineering degree.

In Atlanta in 1996 he competed in his second Olympic Games. He registered exactly the same time in the freestyle as he had at the previous Olympics and was second in his heat, 41st overall. In the butterfly he also finished second in his heat with a time of 56.09, which placed him in 40th position.

== Later life ==
Linscheer, who worked as a civil engineer, continued to live in Florida after his swimming career finished.

In 2000 he died when his car was involved in a head-on collision on Interstate 95 in Boca Raton. Linscheer was driving a sport-utility vehicle that was heading the wrong way down the motorway with no headlights on and struck a Chevrolet van. The driver of the van was also killed. An investigation found that Linscheer had been intoxicated at the time and was driving on a suspended license.
