= Luca Bianchin =

Italian swimmer

Personal information
- Born: 15 November 1971 (age 54) Milan, Italy

Sport
- Sport: Swimming

Luca Bianchin (born 15 November 1971) is an Italian swimmer. He competed in the men's 200 metre backstroke event at the 1992 Summer Olympics.
