= Ian Raynor =

Bermudian swimmer (born 1972)

Personal information
- Born: 11 January 1972 (age 54)

Sport
- Sport: Swimming

Ian Raynor (born 11 January 1972) is a Bermudian swimmer. He competed in four events at the 1992 Summer Olympics.
