= Yasuhiro Vandewalle =

Belgian swimmer

Personal information
- Born: 18 May 1970 (age 56) Bruges, Belgium

Sport
- Sport: Swimming

Yasuhiro Vandewalle (born 18 May 1970) is a Belgian backstroke swimmer. He competed in three events at the 1992 Summer Olympics.
