= Marc Verbeeck =

Belgian swimmer

Personal information
- Born: 14 October 1968 (age 57) Wilrijk, Belgium

Sport
- Sport: Swimming

Marc Verbeeck (born 14 October 1968) is a Belgian freestyle swimmer. He competed in three events at the 1992 Summer Olympics.
