= Ilmar Ojase =

Estonian swimmer

Personal information
- Born: 6 July 1973 (age 53) Mineralnye Vody, Russia

Sport
- Sport: Swimming

Ilmar Ojase (born 6 July 1973) is an Estonian former backstroke swimmer. He competed in three events at the 1992 Summer Olympics.
