= Rhoderick McGown =

Zimbabwean swimmer (born 1972)

Personal information
- Born: 10 October 1972 (age 53)

Sport
- Sport: Swimming

Rhoderick McGown (born 10 October 1972) is a Zimbabwean freestyle and butterfly swimmer. He competed in three events at the 1992 Summer Olympics.
