= Christophe Kalfayan =

French swimmer

Personal information
- Full name: Christophe Kalfayan
- Nationality: French
- Born: 26 May 1969 (age 57) Antibes, Alpes-Maritimes
- Height: 1.76 m (5 ft 9 in)

Sport
- Sport: Swimming
- Strokes: Freestyle
- Club: Club Nautique Antibes
Medal record
European Championships (LC)
Silver medal – second place	1989 Bonn	4×100 m freestyle
Silver medal – second place	1991 Athens	4×100 m medley
Silver medal – second place	1993 Sheffield	50 m freestyle
Silver medal – second place	1995 Vienna	50 m freestyle
Mediterranean Games
Gold medal – first place	1991 Athens	100 m freestyle
Gold medal – first place	1993 Narbonne	50 m freestyle
Gold medal – first place	1993 Narbonne	100 m freestyle

Christophe Kalfayan (born 26 May 1969 in Antibes, Alpes-Maritimes) is a French retired male freestyle swimmer, who represented his native country in three consecutive Summer Olympics, starting in 1988. He specialised in the 50m and 100m freestyle. He twice won the silver medal in the men's 50 m freestyle at the European LC Championships (50 m): in 1993 and 1995.

== See also ==
- List of European Aquatics Championships medalists in swimming (men)
