= Stefaan Maene =

Belgian swimmer (born 1972)

Personal information
- Full name: Stefaan Maene
- Nationality: Belgium
- Born: 13 May 1972 (age 54) Ostend, West Flanders, Belgium

Sport
- Sport: Swimming
- Strokes: Backstroke
Medal record
Men's swimming
Representing Belgium
World Championships (SC)
Bronze medal – third place	1993 Palma	200 m backstroke
European Championships (LC)
Bronze medal – third place	1995 Vienna	100 m backstroke

Stefaan Maene (born 13 May 1972 in Ostend) is a former backstroke, freestyle and medley swimmer from Belgium, who competed for his native country at the 1992 Summer Olympics in Barcelona, Spain. He won his first international medal at the inaugural 1993 FINA Short Course World Championships in Palma de Mallorca: bronze in the 200 m backstroke. Two years later, at the 1995 European Aquatics Championships in Vienna, Austria, Maene gained bronze in the 100 m backstroke.
