= Plutarco Castellanos =

Honduran swimmer (born 1971)

Personal information
- Born: 8 July 1971 (age 55)

Sport
- Sport: Swimming

Plutarco Castellanos (born 8 July 1971) is a Honduran swimmer. He competed at the 1988 Summer Olympics and the 1992 Summer Olympics.
