= Marco Braida =

Italian swimmer

Personal information
- Born: 26 November 1966 (age 59) Bergamo, Italy
Medal record
Men's swimming
Representing Italy
European Championships
Bronze medal – third place	1989 Bonn	4×100 m medley

Marco Braida (born 26 November 1966) is a retired Italian swimmer who won a bronze medal in the 4 × 100 m medley relay at the 1989 European Aquatics Championships. He also competed at the 1992 Summer Olympics in two butterfly events, but did not reach the finals.
