= Jaime Fernández (swimmer) =

Spanish swimmer

Personal information
- Born: September 17, 1968 (age 57)

Sport
- Sport: Swimming
- Strokes: Butterfly

Jaime Fernández (born 17 September 1968) is a Spanish butterfly swimmer who competed in the 1992 Summer Olympics.
