= Bruno Gutzeit =

French swimmer

Personal information
- Born: 2 March 1966 (age 60) Orléans, Loiret, France
Medal record
Men's swimming
Representing France
European Championships (LC)
Silver medal – second place	1989 Bonn	100 m butterfly
Silver medal – second place	1989 Bonn	4×100 m freestyle
Silver medal – second place	1989 Bonn	4×100 m medley
Silver medal – second place	1991 Athens	4×100 m medley relay

Bruno Gutzeit (born 2 March 1966 in Orléans, Loiret) is a retired butterfly swimmer from France, who represented his native country at two consecutive Summer Olympics, starting in 1988. He won three silver medals at the 1989 European Long Course Championships in Bonn, West Germany.
