= Thomas Sopp =

Norwegian swimmer

Personal information
- Nationality: Norwegian
- Born: 15 September 1971 (age 54) Sandefjord, Norway

Sport
- Sport: Swimming

Thomas Holmén Sopp (born 15 September 1971) is a Norwegian backstroke and freestyle swimmer. He was born in Sandefjord.

Sopp competed at the 1992 Summer Olympics in Barcelona, and won a total of thirteen gold medals at the Norwegian championships.
