= Tino Weber =

German swimmer

Personal information
- Born: 12 February 1970 (age 56)
Medal record
Men's swimming
Representing Germany
European Championships (LC)
Gold medal – first place	1991 Athens	50 m freestyle
Bronze medal – third place	1989 Bonn	200 m backstroke
Bronze medal – third place	1995 Vienna	4×100 m medley
European Championships (SC)
Silver medal – second place	1993 Gateshead	50 m backstroke

Tino Weber (born 12 February 1970) is a former backstroke swimmer from Germany.

He was born in Merseburg, Sachsen-Anhalt, and competed for his native country at the 1992 Summer Olympics in Barcelona, Spain. A member of Sportverein Halle, he won a silver medal at the 1993 European Sprint Swimming Championships in Gateshead.
