= Franck Schott =

French swimmer (born 1970)

Personal information
- Born: 16 May 1970 (age 56) Saint-Paul, Réunion
Medal record
Men's swimming
Representing France
European Championships (LC)
Silver medal – second place	1989 Bonn	4×100 m medley
Silver medal – second place	1991 Athens	4×100 m medley
Bronze medal – third place	1991 Athens	100 m backstroke
Mediterranean Games
Gold medal – first place	1991 Athens	100 m backstroke
Gold medal – first place	1993 Narbonne	100 m backstroke

Franck Schott (born 16 May 1970 in Saint-Paul, Réunion) is a retired backstroke and freestyle swimmer from France, who represented his native country at three consecutive Summer Olympics, starting in 1988. He won a bronze and a silver medal at the 1991 European Long Course Championships in Athens, Greece.
