= List of flag bearers for Suriname at the Olympics =

Suriname at the Olympics
- IOC code: SUR
- NOC: Suriname Olympic Committee
- Website: www.surolympic.org
- Medals: Gold 1 Silver 0 Bronze 1 Total 2

Summer appearances
- 1960; 1964; 1968; 1972; 1976; 1980; 1984; 1988; 1992; 1996; 2000; 2004; 2008; 2012; 2016; 2020; 2024

This is a list of flag bearers who have represented Suriname at the Olympics.

Flag bearers carry the national flag of their country at the opening ceremony of the Olympic Games.

#	Event year	Season	Flag bearer	Sport	Ref.
1	1960	Summer	Wim Esajas	Athletics (did not compete)	
2	1968	Summer	Eddy Monsels	Athletics	
3	1972	Summer	Sammy Monsels	Athletics	
4	1976	Summer	Ricardo Elmont	Judo	
5	1984	Summer	Siegfried Cruden	Athletics	
6	1988	Summer	Anthony Nesty	Swimming	
7	1992	Summer	Tommy Asinga	Athletics	
8	1996	Summer	Enrico Linscheer	Swimming	
9	2000	Summer	Letitia Vriesde	Athletics	
10	2004	Summer	Letitia Vriesde	Athletics	
11	2008	Summer	Anthony Nesty	Swimming (did not compete)	
12	2012	Summer	Chinyere Pigot	Swimming	
13	2016	Summer	Soren Opti	Badminton	
14	2020	Summer	Renzo Tjon-A-Joe	Swimming	
15	2024	Summer	Kaelyn Ciara Suryanti Djoparto	Swimming	
15	2024	Summer	Irvin Hoost	Swimming	

== See also ==
- Suriname at the Olympics
