= Suriname at the 1960 Summer Olympics =

- IOC code: SUR
- NOC: Suriname Olympic Committee

in Rome, Italy
- Competitors: 0 (Note: Wim Esajas did not compete in his event.) in 1 sport
- Flag bearer: Wim Esajas
- Medals: Gold 0 Silver 0 Bronze 0 Total 0

Summer Olympics appearances (overview)
- 1960; 1964; 1968; 1972; 1976; 1980; 1984; 1988; 1992; 1996; 2000; 2004; 2008; 2012; 2016; 2020; 2024

Suriname participated in the Olympic Games for the first time at the 1960 Summer Olympics in Rome, Italy, before becoming independent of the Netherlands. The games were held from 25 August to 11 September 1960. The nation sent a delegation of three people: two officials, attaché Lia Del Neri and secretary-general Freddy Glans, and one athlete, runner Wim Esajas, who was set to compete in the men's 800 metres. The national football and basketball teams failed to qualify. Esajas did not participate; he arrived late and missed his heat.

Four and a half decades later, the Suriname Olympic Committee and sports journalist Will Axwijk conducted an investigation and found out Esajas was given wrong information by Glans regarding the start time of his competition. The committee apologized to Esajas and honored him with a plaque naming him the first Surinamese Olympian.

== Background ==
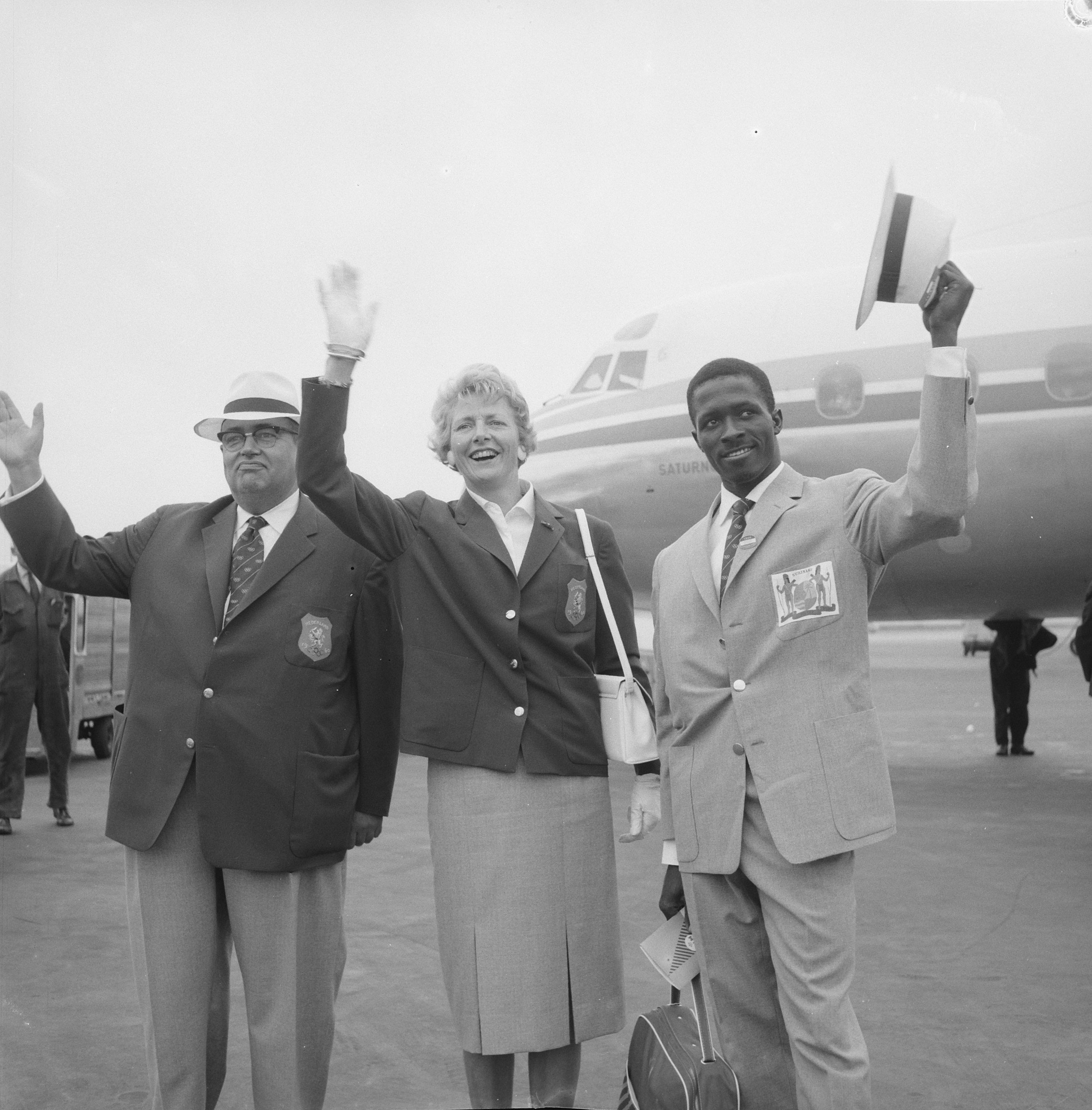
Esajas (right) with NOC board member P.C. van Houten (left) and athletics coach Fanny Blankers-Koen (middle), about to board a flight to Rome

The 1960 Summer Olympics were held from 25 August to 11 September 1960, in Rome, Italy. This edition marked Suriname's first appearance at the Olympic Games, with the Suriname Olympic Committee (SOC) being recognized by the International Olympic Committee (IOC) the year prior. The SOC's request for recognition by the IOC in 1956 was rejected, as the Surinamese Football Association was the only organization affiliated with the SOC. The SOC was recognized by the IOC after more national sporting federations were affiliated with it.

=== Qualification ===
Suriname made bids to qualify for three sports. The Suriname national football team first competed for the nation in the Olympic football qualifying tournament, tying their first match 2–2 against the Netherlands Antilles national football team on 25 October 1959. They beat the same team 4–1 on 29 November of the same year, winning 6–3 on aggregate and advancing to the next round. The team then competed in a series of matches against Argentina on 16 April 1960, where they lost 6–2; Peru on 19 April 1960, losing 3–1; Mexico on 21 April 1960, losing 4–0; and Brazil on 27 April 1960, losing 4–1. They did not qualify for the Olympics.

The Suriname men's national basketball team competed at the 1960 pre-Olympic basketball tournament in the first pool in Group B. The team won their first match, playing against Sudan on 13 August 1960, scoring 61–51. The team then lost to Czechoslovakia on 14 August 1960, with a score of 49–121; Spain on 16 August 1960, with a score 54–77; and Formosa on 17 August 1960, with a score of 82–95. They were then relegated to the classification matches, losing to Thailand on 18 August 1960, with a score of 61–82 and Switzerland on 20 August 1960, with a score of 60–71. They placed eighth out of nine teams in the pool and did not qualify for the Olympics.

The nation ultimately qualified one athlete, middle-distance runner Wim Esajas. Esajas was a multiple national record holder in the men's 800 metres, 1500 metres, and 3000 metres. He was also named the Surinamese Sportsman of the Year in 1956 and won the 800 metres in a time of 1:50.9 at the 1960 Dutch Athletics Championships.

=== Delegation and opening ceremony ===
The Surinamese delegation consisted of three people. Officials present were attaché Lia Del Neri, and secretary-general of the SOC, Fred "Freddy" Glans. The athlete who was present was Esajas, who was set to compete in the men's 800 metres. Esajas was a student in the Netherlands and flew to Rome for the games from Amsterdam Airport Schiphol together with Netherlands Olympic Committee member P.C. van Houten and athletics coach Fanny Blankers-Koen, who had won four gold medals in athletics at the 1948 Summer Olympics in London, England.

The Surinamese delegation marched 73rd out of 84 countries in the 1960 Summer Olympics Parade of Nations within the opening ceremony. Esajas held the flag for the delegation in the ceremony.

== Athletics ==
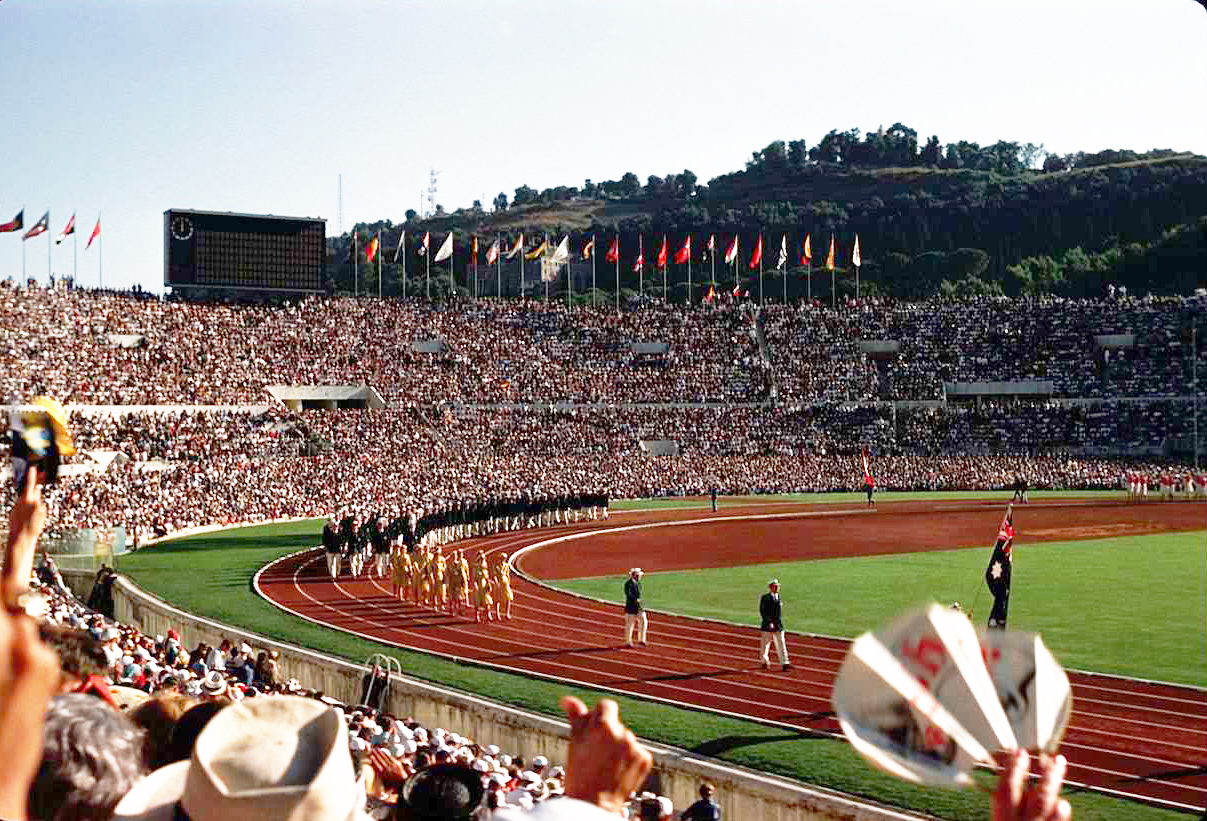
The Stadio Olimpico, site of the athletics events for the 1960 Summer Olympics

The athletics events were held at the Stadio Olimpico. Esajas was set to compete in the men's 800 metres on 31 August, in the ninth heat. The heats were originally scheduled for the afternoon, but were moved to the morning. On the day of the event, Esajas arrived after the heats had finished and began warming up. His former coach, Hugo Wiersma, was there to watch him compete and told him that he had missed his event. Esajas cried.

Key

- Note–Ranks given for track events are within the athlete's heat only
- DNS = Did not start

Track events summary
Athlete	Event	Heat		Quarterfinal		Semifinal		Final	
Athlete	Event	Result	Rank	Result	Rank	Result	Rank	Result	Rank
Wim Esajas	Men's 800 m	DNS		Did not advance					

== Aftermath ==
Following his non-attendance, reports circulated that Esajas had missed the games after oversleeping, and he was nicknamed "Schone Slaper", Dutch for Sleeping Beauty. After the games, he continued his studies in Deventer, Netherlands, and graduated with a horticultural degree. He returned to Suriname, and married Lygia Esajas Anijs and had five children. The incident at the games was mentioned in the 1976 Summer Olympics Parade of Nations within the opening ceremony in Montreal, Canada, when the Surinamese delegation marched in and the announcer introduced the delegation as the country that "slept through its first Olympics".

In 2005, Esajas was admitted to a hospital due to a terminal illness. Sports journalist Will Axwijk then investigated with the SOC at the organization's archives in Paramaribo, revealing that Glans had not informed Esajas of the scheduling change and had covered up information regarding his mistake. Esajas was entirely blameless. The SOC and Ministry of Regional Development and Sports then gave Esajas a letter of apology and a plaque honoring him as the first Surinamese Olympian. His son, Werner Esajas, stated that once he received the apology and the plaque, "his eyes and face lit up and he was happy ... I think it was enough for him to finally have peace." Wim Esajas died two weeks later at the age of 70.

=== Legacy ===
As of 11 August 2024, Suriname has competed in every Summer Olympics since 1968 with the exception of the 1980 Summer Olympics, boycotting in response to the Soviet invasion of Afghanistan. Swimmer Anthony Nesty won Suriname's first Olympic medal of any color at the 1988 Summer Olympics, winning gold in the men's 100 metre butterfly event. He would go on and win a bronze medal at the 1992 Summer Olympics in the same event; as of the 2024 Summer Olympics, his medals remain the only ones for the nation.
