= Suriname at the 2008 Summer Olympics =

- IOC code: SUR
- NOC: Suriname Olympic Committee

in Beijing
- Competitors: 4 in 2 sports
- Flag bearer: Anthony Nesty
- Medals: Gold 0 Silver 0 Bronze 0 Total 0

Summer Olympics appearances (overview)
- 1960; 1964; 1968; 1972; 1976; 1980; 1984; 1988; 1992; 1996; 2000; 2004; 2008; 2012; 2016; 2020; 2024; 2028

Suriname sent a delegation of four people to compete at the 2008 Summer Olympics in Beijing, China: two athletes (Jurgen Themen and Kirsten Nieuwendam and two swimmers (Gordon Touw Ngie Tjouw and Chinyere Pigot) who participated in four distinct events. The appearance of Suriname at Beijing marked its tenth Olympic appearance, which included every Olympic games since the 1968 Summer Olympics in Mexico City and excluded the 1980 Summer Olympics in Moscow. Its four athletes did not advance past the first round in each of their events. The Surinamese flag bearer in Beijing was not an athlete, but Anthony Nesty, the only medalist in Surinamese history (as of the Beijing Olympics) and the nation's Olympic swimming coach.

== Background ==
Up to and including its participation in the Beijing Games, Surinamese athletes participated in ten Olympic games, all of which were summer Games. The first case of a Surinamese athlete's participation was at the 1968 Summer Olympics in Mexico City, when it sent a single male athlete. Since then, Suriname's athletes have participated in every Olympic games except the 1980 Summer Olympics in the Soviet Union. As of Beijing, the country had not sent more than seven athletes to any one Games. Prior to and including 2008, one Surinamese athlete had won the two medals ever claimed by Surinamese athletes–Anthony Nesty, who won a gold medal in 1988, and a bronze medal in 1992, both in swimming events. No medals were won in Beijing.

Although Nesty did not participate in any event at the Beijing Olympics, he was Suriname's flag bearer at the ceremonies. He also served as the head coach for the Surinamese Olympic swim team, having served previously as associate head coach for the University of Florida swim team and, during the 2004 Summer Olympics in Athens, the assistant coach for the Surinamese team.

== Athletics ==
Then 22-year old Jurgen Themen appeared at the Olympics for the first time when he participated in the 100 meters dash in Beijing. He was the sole male Surinamese participant in track and field during the 2008 Olympics. Themen participated in the first heat during the August 14 qualification round, completing the event in 10.61 seconds and ranking seventh of eight athletes. The leaders of Themen's heat included Usain Bolt of Jamaica (10.20 seconds) and Daniel Bailey of Antigua and Barbuda (10.24 seconds). Themen himself scored directly ahead of Vanuatu's Moses Kamut (10.81 seconds) and directly behind Italy's Fabio Cerutti (10.49 seconds). All heats combined, Themen ranked 54 out of the 80 athletes who participated in the qualification round. He did not progress to quarterfinals.

Then 16-year-old student of Florida's St. Thomas Aquinas High School Kirsten Nieuwendam participated in the Beijing Olympics on behalf of Suriname as its only female track and field athlete that year. Nieuwendam had not previously participated in any Olympic games. Nieuwendam participated in the first heat of the qualification round, which took place on August 18. She completed her event in 24.46 seconds, placing seventh out of the eight athletes in her heat, finishing behind Liberia's Kia Davis (24.31 seconds). Vida Anim of Ghana, the eighth competitor in the heat, never started her event. The leaders of Nieuwendam's heat were Allyson Felix of the United States (23.02 seconds) and Susanthika Jayasinghe of Sri Lanka (23.04 seconds). Out of the 48 athletes who competed in the qualification round, Nieuwendam ranked 44th. She did not progress to further rounds.

Men

Athlete	Event	Heat		Quarterfinal		Semifinal		Final	
Athlete	Event	Result	Rank	Result	Rank	Result	Rank	Result	Rank
Jurgen Themen	100 m	10.61	6	Did not advance					

Women

Athlete	Event	Heat		Quarterfinal		Semifinal		Final	
Athlete	Event	Result	Rank	Result	Rank	Result	Rank	Result	Rank
Kirsten Nieuwendam	200 m	24.46 NR	7	Did not advance					

Key

- Note–Ranks given for track events are within the athlete's heat only
- Q = Qualified for the next round
- q = Qualified for the next round as a fastest loser or, in field events, by position without achieving the qualifying target
- NR = National record
- N/A = Round not applicable for the event
- Bye = Athlete not required to compete in round

== Swimming ==
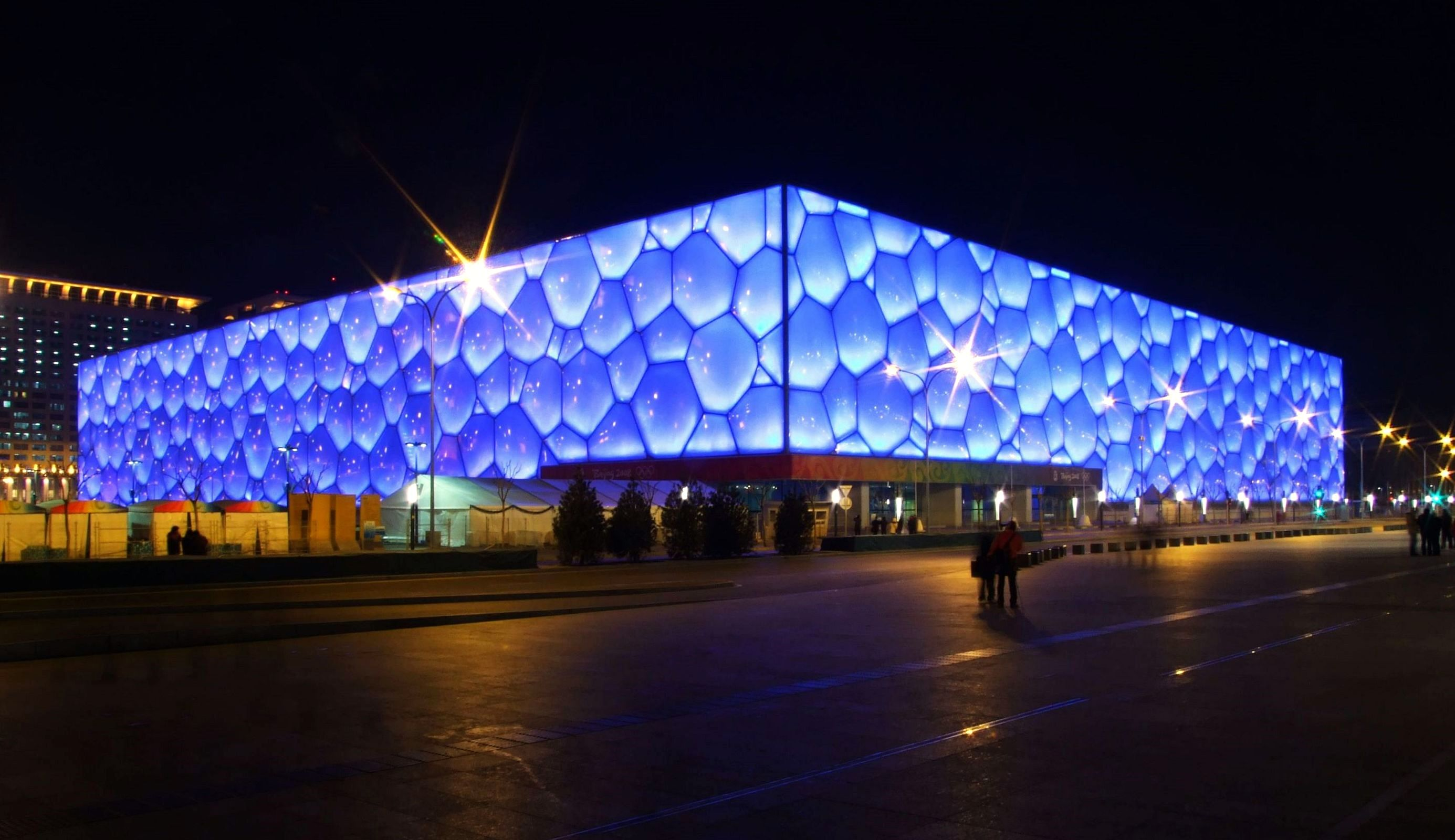
The "Water Cube", where Tjouw and Pigot participated in their swimming events

Then 23-year-old Gordon Touw Ngie Tjouw participated on Suriname's behalf in the men's 100 meters butterfly. His participation in Beijing marked his second Olympic appearance, as he had participated previously in men's 100 meters butterfly at the Athenian 2004 Summer Olympics. He was the only male Surinamese swimmer participating in the Beijing games. During the August 14 preliminary round, Tjouw participated in the second heat. He completed his event in 54.54 seconds, ranking third out of the seven athletes in the heat. Tjouw ranked directly behind Malaysia's Daniel Bego (54.38 seconds) and directly ahead of Kazakhstan's Rustam Khudiyev (54.62 seconds). The leaders of the heat were Shaune Fraser of the Cayman Islands (54.08 seconds) and Bego. Overall, Tjouw ranked 55 out of the 66 athletes who participated in the event. He did not advance to later rounds.

Paramaribo-born swimmer Chinyere Pigot was the youngest athlete to participate in the Surinamese delegation at Beijing; she was fifteen years old at the time of her performance, and the only female Surinamese swimmer in the delegation. Pigot has not previously appeared at any Olympic games. The preliminary round for the women's 50 meters freestyle, the event in which she participated, took place on August 15. Pigot was placed in the fifth heat. She completed her event in 27.66 seconds, taking second in the heat; Pigot fell behind Honduran athlete Sharon Paola Fajardo Sierra (27.19 seconds) but scored ahead of Nicaraguan Dalia Tórrez Zamora (27.81 seconds). Out of the 92 athletes who participated in the preliminary round, Pigot ranked 54th. She did not advance to later rounds.

Men

Athlete	Event	Heat		Semifinal		Final	
Athlete	Event	Time	Rank	Time	Rank	Time	Rank
Gordon Touw Ngie Tjouw	100 m butterfly	54.54	55	Did not advance			

Women

Athlete	Event	Heat		Semifinal		Final	
Athlete	Event	Time	Rank	Time	Rank	Time	Rank
Chinyere Pigot	50 m freestyle	27.66	54	Did not advance			

== See also ==
- Suriname at the 2007 Pan American Games
- Suriname at the 2010 Central American and Caribbean Games
