= Suriname at the 2012 Summer Olympics =

- IOC code: SUR
- NOC: Suriname Olympic Committee

in London, United Kingdom July 27, 2012 – August 12, 2012
- Competitors: 5 in 3 sports
- Flag bearer (opening): Chinyere Pigot
- Flag bearer (closing): Kirsten Nieuwendam
- Medals: Gold 0 Silver 0 Bronze 0 Total 0

Summer Olympics appearances (overview)
- 1960; 1964; 1968; 1972; 1976; 1980; 1984; 1988; 1992; 1996; 2000; 2004; 2008; 2012; 2016; 2020; 2024

Suriname competed at the 2012 Summer Olympics in London, United Kingdom, from 27 July to 12 August 2012. It was the nation's twelfth appearance at the Summer Olympics, since its debut at the 1960 Summer Olympics in Rome. The Surinamese delegation consisted of five athletes competing in three sports. Suriname did not win any medals at the Games.

== Background ==
The Suriname Olympic Committee was founded in 1956 and was recognized by the International Olympic Committee (IOC) in 1959. The nation made its Olympic debut at the 1960 Summer Olympics in Rome, and has competed in every Summer Olympics since then except in 1964 and 1980. The 2012 Summer Olympics marked the country's twelfth appearance at the Summer Olympics.

The 2012 Summer Olympics were held in London, United Kingdom, between 27 July and 12 August 2012. Freestyle swimmer Chinyere Pigot was the flagbearer for Suriname during the opening ceremony. Sprinter Kirsten Nieuwendam was the flagbearer during the closing ceremony. Suriname did not win a medal at the Games.

== Competitors ==
The Suriname delegation consisted of five athletes (three men and two women) competing in three sports.

| Sport | Men | Women | Total |
|---|---|---|---|
| Athletics | 1 | 1 | 2 |
| Badminton | 1 | 0 | 1 |
| Swimming | 1 | 1 | 2 |
| Total | 3 | 2 | 5 |

== Athletics ==
As per IAAF, a National Olympic Committee (NOC) was allowed to enter up to three qualified athletes in each individual event if the Olympic Qualifying Standard time was met during the qualifying period from 1 May 2011 to 8 July 2012. The remaining quotas were allocated by the Tripartite Commission as universality invitations. Suriname entered two athletes in the athletics events–Jurgen Themen in the men's 100 metres and Kirsten Nieuwendam in the women's 200 metres.

Themen was competing at his second consecutive Olympics, having previously represented Suriname at the 2008 Summer Olympics in Beijing. He had a personal best of 10.47 seconds in the 100 metres. Nieuwendam, aged 20, competed in her first Olympics, and had a personal best time of 23.47 seconds in the 200 metres.

The athletics events were held at the Olympic Stadium in the Olympic Park in Stratford, London. In the men's 100 metres, held on 4 and 5 August 2012, Themen finished first in heat 2 of the preliminary round with a time of 10.55 seconds, qualifying for the next round. In the quarterfinal, he finished fifth in heat 1 with a time of 10.53 seconds and did not advance to the semifinal. In the women's 200 metres, held on 6 to 8 August 2012, Nieuwendam finished eighth and last in heat 5 of the first round with a time of 24.07 seconds and did not advance further.

| Athlete | Event | Heat | | Quarterfinal | | Semifinal | | Final | |
| Athlete | Event | Result | Rank | Result | Rank | Result | Rank | Result | Rank |
|---|---|---|---|---|---|---|---|---|---|
| Jurgen Themen | Men's 100 m | 10.55 | 1 Q | 10.53 | 5 | Did not advance | | | |
| Kirsten Nieuwendam | Women's 200 m | 24.07 | 8 | Did not advance | | | | | |

- Ranks indicate placing in the individual heats.

== Badminton ==
The Olympic qualification was based on the Badminton World Federation (BWF) World Rankings during the period from 2 May 2011 to 29 April 2012. For the singles event, 38 places were allocated per gender, primarily through the BWF World Rankings, with additional invitational places allocated by the IOC Tripartite Commission. Suriname qualified one badminton player, Virgil Soeroredjo, for the men's singles event.

Soeroredjo was born on 11 March 1985 and is affiliated with Badminton van Zijderveld club in the Netherlands. He had represented Suriname at three Pan American Games (2003, 2007 and 2011), and won bronze medals at the 2002 and 2010 Central American and Caribbean Games. This was his first Olympic appearance and the first Olympic badminton appearance for Suriname since Oscar Brandon at the 1996 Summer Olympics.

The badminton events were held at Wembley Arena in London from 28 July to 5 August 2012. Soeroredjo was drawn into Group N alongside sixth seed Sho Sasaki of Japan. He lost his sole group stage match to Sasaki 12–21, 7–21 and was eliminated from the competition.

| Athlete | Event | Group Stage | | Elimination | Quarterfinal | Semifinal | Final / BM | |
| Athlete | Event | Opposition Score | Rank | Opposition Score | Opposition Score | Opposition Score | Opposition Score | Rank |
|---|---|---|---|---|---|---|---|---|
| Virgil Soeroredjo | Men's singles | Sasaki (JPN); L 7–21, 12–21 | 2 | Did not advance | | | | |

== Swimming ==
As per FINA, a NOC was permitted to enter a maximum of two qualified athletes in each individual event who achieved the Olympic Qualifying Time (OQT) or Olympic Selection Time (OST) during the qualifying period from 1 March 2011 to 25 June 2012. NOCs were otherwise granted entry to enroll two swimmers (one per gender) under universality places. Suriname entered two swimmers for the Games.

Chinyere Pigot competed in the women's 50 metre freestyle and her brother Diguan Pigot competed in the men's 100 metre breaststroke. Chinyere Pigot was born on 1 May 1993 and while studying at the University of Connecticut, she had set school records in the 50-yard and 100-yard freestyle events. She had previously competed at the 2008 Summer Olympics in Beijing at the age of 14, making her the youngest athlete in Suriname's Olympic history at that time. Diguan Pigot, born on 24 June 1994, was the younger sibling and was set to enter his first Olympic Games.

The swimming events were held at the London Aquatics Centre in the Olympic Park, Stratford, London. In the women's 50 metre freestyle heat on 3 August 2012, Chinyere Pigot finished 40th overall with a time of 26.30 seconds and did not advance to the semi-finals. In the men's 100 metre breaststroke heat on 28 July 2012, Diguan Pigot finished 43rd overall with a time of 1:05.55 and did not advance to the semi-finals.

| Athlete | Event | Heat | | Semifinal | | Final | |
| Athlete | Event | Time | Rank | Time | Rank | Time | Rank |
|---|---|---|---|---|---|---|---|
| Diguan Pigot | Men's 100 m breaststroke | 1:05.55 | 43 | Did not advance | | | |
| Chinyere Pigot | Women's 50 m freestyle | 26.30 | 40 | Did not advance | | | |

Qualifiers for the latter rounds (Q) of all events were decided on a time only basis, therefore positions shown are overall results versus competitors in all heats.

== See also ==
- Suriname at the Pan American Games
