= Suriname at the 2016 Summer Olympics =

- IOC code: SUR
- NOC: Suriname Olympic Committee

in Rio de Janeiro, Brazil 5 August 2016 – 21 August 2016
- Competitors: 6 in 4 sports
- Flag bearer (opening): Sören Opti
- Flag bearer (closing): Jurgen Themen
- Medals: Gold 0 Silver 0 Bronze 0 Total 0

Summer Olympics appearances (overview)
- 1960; 1964; 1968; 1972; 1976; 1980; 1984; 1988; 1992; 1996; 2000; 2004; 2008; 2012; 2016; 2020; 2024

Suriname competed at the 2016 Summer Olympics in Rio de Janeiro, Brazil, from 5 to 21 August 2016. It was the nation's thirteenth appearance at the Summer Olympics, since its debut at the 1960 Summer Olympics in Rome. The Suriname delegation consisted of six athletes competing in four sports. Suriname did not win any medals at the Games.

== Background ==
The Suriname Olympic Committee was founded in 1956 and was recognized by the International Olympic Committee (IOC) in 1959. The nation made its Olympic debut at the 1960 Summer Olympics in Rome, and has competed in every Summer Olympics since then except in 1964 and 1980. The 2016 Summer Olympics marked the country's thirteenth appearance at the Summer Olympics.

The 2016 Summer Olympics were held in Rio de Janeiro, Brazil, between 5 and 21 August 2016. Badminton player Sören Opti was the flagbearer for Suriname during the opening ceremony. Sprinter Jurgen Themen was the flagbearer during the closing ceremony. Suriname did not win a medal at the Games.

== Competitors ==
The Suriname delegation consisted of six athletes (four men and two women) competing in four sports.

Sport	Men	Women	Total
Athletics	1	1	2
Badminton	1	0	1
Judo	1	0	1
Swimming	1	1	2
Total	4	2	6

== Athletics ==
As per World Athletics, a NOC was allowed to enter up to three qualified athletes in each individual event if the Olympic Qualifying Standard time was met during the qualifying period from 1 May 2015 to 11 July 2016. All remaining quotas were allocated by the Tripartite Commission as universality invitations.

Suriname had two athletes, Jurgen Themen, in the men's 100 metres, and Sunayna Wahi in the women's 100 metres, competing at the Games. Themen was born on 26 October 1985 and competed at his third consecutive Olympics, having previously represented Suriname at the 2008 and 2012 Games, and had a personal best of 10.47 seconds set in 2012. Wahi, aged 26, was competing in her first Olympics.

The athletics events were held at the Estádio Olímpico João Havelange in Rio de Janeiro. In the men's 100 metres, held on 13 August 2016, Themen finished eighth in heat 7 of the quarterfinals with a time of 10.47 seconds and did not advance to the semi-finals. In the women's 100 metres, held on 12 August 2016, Wahi finished first in second heat of the preliminary round and advance to the quarterfinals, where she finished last in her heat and failed to advance further.

Athlete	Event	Heat		Quarterfinal		Semifinal		Final	
Athlete	Event	Time	Rank	Time	Rank	Time	Rank	Time	Rank
Jurgen Themen	Men's 100 m	Bye		10.47	8	Did not advance			
Sunayna Wahi	Women's 100 m	12.09	1 Q	12.25	8	Did not advance			

== Badminton ==
The Olympic qualification was based on the Badminton World Federation (BWF) rankings for the period between 4 May 2015 and 5 May 2016. Each NOC was permitted to enter a maximum of two players each in the singles event if both were ranked in the world's top 16 with one quota place to other NOCs until the roster of thirty-eight players has been completed.

Suriname qualified one badminton player, Sören Opti, for the men's singles event. This was Opti's first Olympic appearance, having represented Suriname in the 2014 Central American and Caribbean Games. He is also the second ever athlete from Suriname to take part in the badminton event at the Olympics after Oscar Brandon in the 1996 Summer Olympics.

The badminton events were held at Riocentro Pavilhão in Rio de Janeiro. Opti was drawn into Group A alongside top seed Lee Chong Wei of Malaysia and Derek Wong of Singapore. He lost both his group stage matches and was eliminated from the competition, and was placed equal 14th overall.

Athlete	Event	Group Stage			Elimination	Quarterfinal	Semifinal	Final / BM	
Athlete	Event	Opposition Score	Opposition Score	Rank	Opposition Score	Opposition Score	Opposition Score	Opposition Score	Rank
Soren Opti	Men's singles	Lee C W (MAS); L (2–21, 3–21)	Wong (SIN); L (5–21, 6–21)	3	Did not advance				

== Judo ==
Suriname qualified one judoka, Yigal Kopinsky, for the men's –66 kg event through a Tripartite Commission invitation, marking the country's first Olympic participation in judo since the 1988 Summer Olympics. Suriname returned to the Judo event at the Olympics after 28 years, having last competed at the 1988 Summer Olympics.

The judo events were held at Carioca Arena in the Barra Olympic Park. Kopinsky was eliminated in the first round of the men's –66 kg event, held on 7 August 2016. He lost to Houd Zourdani of Algeria by an ippon.

Athlete	Event	Round of 64	Round of 32	Round of 16	Quarterfinals	Semifinals	Repechage	Final / BM	
Athlete	Event	Opposition Result	Opposition Result	Opposition Result	Opposition Result	Opposition Result	Opposition Result	Opposition Result	Rank
Yigal Kopinsky	Men's −66 kg	Bye	Zourdani (ALG); L 000–100	Did not advance					

== Swimming ==
As per World Aquatics, a NOC was permitted to enter a maximum of two qualified athletes in each individual event who achieved the Olympic Qualifying Time. NOCs were otherwise allowed to enter two swimmers (one per gender) under a universality place. Suriname entered two swimmers at the Games through universality places.

Renzo Tjon A Joe competed in the men's 50 metre freestyle and Evita Leter competed in the women's 100 metre breaststroke. This was the first Olympic participation for both the athletes. Tjon A Joe held the Surinamese records in 50 and 100 metre freestyle swimming and was named the Male Athlete of the Year twice in 2013 and 2015, and the Male Swimmer of the Year for three years from 2013 to 2015 in Suriname. Leter similarly held the women's national records in breaststroke, and was awarded the Female Swimmer of the Year in 2016.

The swimming events were held at the Olympic Aquatics Stadium in the Olympic Park. Both athletes competed in their respective qualifying heats and did not advance to the semi-finals.

Athlete	Event	Heat		Semifinal		Final	
Athlete	Event	Time	Rank	Time	Rank	Time	Rank
Renzo Tjon A Joe	Men's 50 m freestyle	22.23 NR	=21	Did not advance			
Evita Leter	Women's 100 m breaststroke	1:14.96	37	Did not advance			

Qualifiers for the latter rounds (Q) of all events were decided on a time only basis, therefore positions shown are overall results versus competitors in all heats.

== See also ==
- Suriname at the Pan American Games
