= Suriname at the 1988 Summer Olympics =

- IOC code: SUR
- NOC: Suriname Olympic Committee

in Seoul, South Korea 17 September 1988 – 2 October 1988
- Competitors: 6 in 4 sports
- Flag bearer: Anthony Nesty
- Medals Ranked 29th: Gold 1 Silver 0 Bronze 0 Total 1

Summer Olympics appearances (overview)
- 1960; 1964; 1968; 1972; 1976; 1980; 1984; 1988; 1992; 1996; 2000; 2004; 2008; 2012; 2016; 2020; 2024

Suriname competed at the 1988 Summer Olympics in Seoul, South Korea, from 17 September to 2 October 1988. It was the nation's sixth appearance at the Summer Olympics, since its debut at the 1960 Summer Olympics in Rome. The Suriname delegation consisted of six athletes (four men and two women) competing in four sports. Anthony Nesty won a gold medal in the swimming event at the Games, which was the nation's first ever Olympic medal.

== Background ==
The Suriname Olympic Committee was founded in 1956 and was recognized by the International Olympic Committee (IOC) in 1959. The nation made its Olympic debut at the 1960 Summer Olympics in Rome, and has competed in every Summer Olympics since then except in 1964 and 1980. The 1988 Summer Olympics marked the country's sixth appearance at the Summer Olympics.

The 1988 Summer Olympics were held in Seoul, South Korea, between 17 September and 2 October 1988. Swimmer Anthony Nesty was the flagbearer for Suriname during the opening ceremony.

== Medalists ==
Suriname won one gold medal at the Games, and was classified in 29th the overall medal table. Anthony Nesty won the medal in the men's 100 metre butterfly event at the Games, which was the nation's first ever Olympic medal.

Medal	Name	Sport	Event	Date
Gold	Anthony Nesty	Swimming	Men's 100 metre butterfly	21 September

== Competitors ==
The Suriname delegation consisted of six athletes (four men and two women) competing in four sports.

Sport	Men	Women	Total
Athletics	1	2	3
Cycling	1	0	1
Judo	1	0	1
Swimming	1	0	1
Total	4	2	6

== Athletics ==
Suriname entered three athletes for the athletics competitions at the 1988 Summer Olympics– Tommy Asinga in the men's 800 metres, Ivette Bonapart in the women's 100 and 200 metres, and Letitia Vriesde in the women's 800 and 1,500 metres.

Asinga was competing at his first Olympics. Bonapart became the first woman to compete for Suriname at the Olympics. After the Olympics, she broke the Surinamese records in the 100 and 200 metres in 1991, and the 100 metres hurdles in 1992. She later relocated to the Netherlands, and won the Dutch national championships in the 4 x 100 metres relay in 1991. Vriesde was also competing in her first Olympics, and went on to represent Suriname at five consecutive Olympic Games from 1988 to 2004. She later won a silver at the 1995 World Athletics Championships and gold at the 1999 Pan American Games in the 800 metres, and set the Surinamese record in the women's 800 metres in 1995.

The athletics events were held at the Seoul Olympic Stadium. Asinga was disqualified in heat seven of the preliminary round of the men's 800 metres and did not advance. Bonapart finished seventh in the second heat of the first round of the women's 100 metres and did not advance to the semifinals. In the women's 200 metres event, she finished sixth in the fifth preliminary heat and did not advance further. Vriesde finished fourth in her preliminary to qualify for the next round of the women's 800 metres. In the semifinals, she finished eighth and last in the second race and did not advance to the final. She finished 12th in second heat of the first round of the women's 1,500 metres and did not advance further.

Athlete	Event	Heat		Semifinal		Final	
Athlete	Event	Result	Rank	Result	Rank	Result	Rank
Tommy Asinga	Men's 800 m	DSQ		Did not advance			
Yvette Bonapart	Women's 100 m	12.27	7	Did not advance			
Yvette Bonapart	Women's 200 m	24.95	6	Did not advance			
Letitia Vriesde	Women's 800 m	2:01.83	4 Q	2:02.34	8	Did not advance	
Letitia Vriesde	Women's 1500 m	4:19.58	12	Did not advance			

== Cycling ==
Suriname entered one cyclist, Realdo Jessurun, who competed in both the men's road race and the individual pursuit on the track. Jessurun was born on 5 September 1969 and was competing at his first Olympics. He subsequently represented Suriname at the 1992 Summer Olympics as well. He was the first athlete to represent Suriname in the track cycling events at the Olympics.

The track cycling event was held at Olympic Velodrome in Seoul. In the first round of the men's individual pursuit on the track, Jessurun was overtaken during the race with Park Min-Su of South Korea, and was not classified. In the men's road race held at the Tongil-ro Circuit on 27 September, he finished 64th out of the 136 competitors, crossing the finish line nearly 34 minutes after the winner Olaf Ludwig.

Road

Athlete	Event	Time	Rank
Realdo Jessurun	Men's road race	4:32:56	64

Track

Athlete	Event	Qualification		Round of 16	Quarterfinals	Semifinals	Final	
Athlete	Event	Time	Rank	Opposition Time	Opposition Time	Opposition Time	Opposition Time	Rank
Realdo Jessurun	Men's individual pursuit	DNF		Did not advance				

== Judo ==
Suriname entered one judoka, Mohamed Madhar, who competed in the men's extra-lightweight (–60 kg) event. Madhar was born on 28 October 1962 and was competing at his second consecutive Olympics, having previously represented Suriname in the same event at the 1984 Summer Olympics in Los Angeles, where he finished joint 12th.

The judo events were held at the Jangchung Gymnasium in Seoul. In the round of 32 match, against Kim Jae-yup of South Korea, Madhar was defeated by an ippon and finished joint 11th overall.

Athlete	Event	Preliminary	Round of 32	Round of 16	Quarterfinals	Semifinals	Repechage 1	Repechage 2	Repechage 3	Final / BM	
Athlete	Event	Opposition Result	Opposition Result	Opposition Result	Opposition Result	Opposition Result	Opposition Result	Opposition Result	Opposition Result	Opposition Result	Rank
Mohamed Madhar	Men's −60 kg	—N/a	Kim Jae-yup (KOR); L 0000-1000	Did not advance							

== Swimming ==
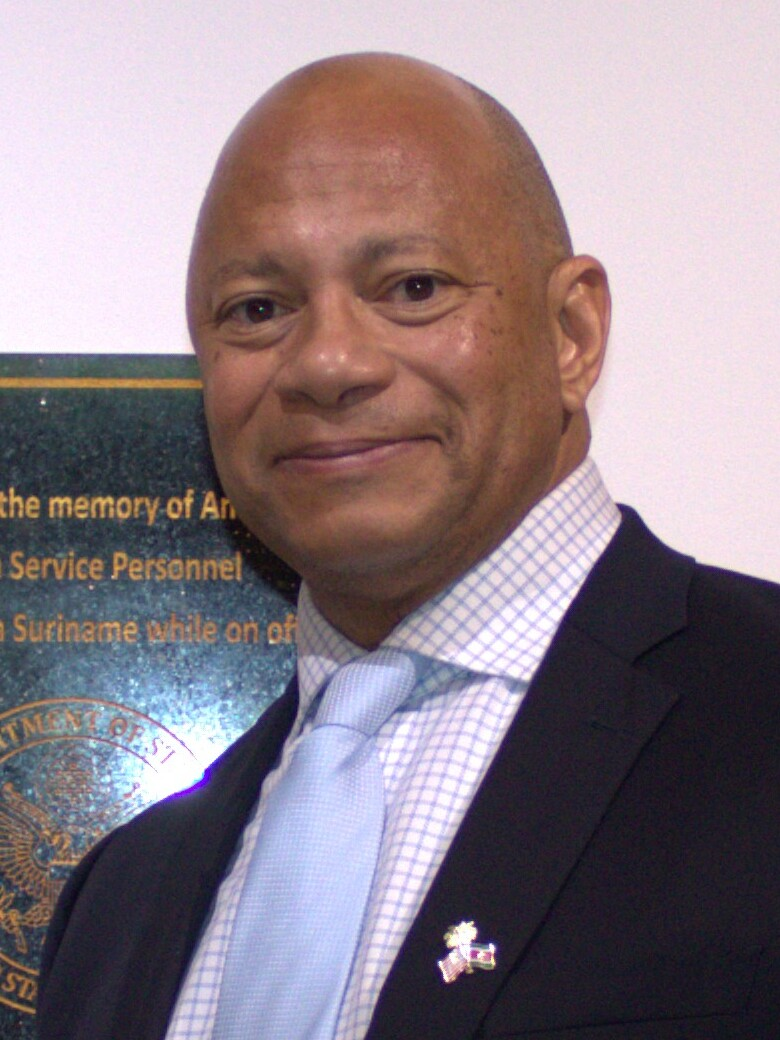
Anthony Nesty won Suriname's first ever Olympic medal

Suriname entered one swimmer, Anthony Nesty, who competed in the men's 100 metres butterfly and the men's 200 metres butterfly. Nesty was born on 25 November 1967 in Trinidad and his family moved to Suriname when he was seven months old. He began swimming at the age of five. After attending the Bolles School in Jacksonville, Florida, he enrolled at the University of Florida. He had previously represented Suriname at the 1984 Summer Olympics in Los Angeles, placing 21st in the 100 metres butterfly event. Prior to the Seoul Games, he had placed fourth at the 1986 World Aquatics Championships in the 100 metres butterfly and won gold in the event at the 1987 Pan American Games.

The swimming events were held at the Olympic Swimming Pool in the Olympic Park, Seoul. In the men's 100 metres butterfly, held on 20 and 21 September 1988, Nesty qualified third overall from the heats with a time of 53.50 seconds. In the final, Matt Biondi of the United States was leading at the halfway mark, and led the race till the final stroke. However, as he could not reach the wall with the final stroke, and stretched to kick, Nesty passed him, and won the race by 1/100th of a second. Nesty was the first ever medal winner for Suriname at the Olympics and the first Black swimmer to win an Olympic gold medal. In the men's 200 metres butterfly, held on 24 September 1988, Nesty qualified eighth overall from the heats with a time of 2:00.17 and finished eighth in the final with a time of 2:00.80.

Athlete	Event	Heat		Final	
Athlete	Event	Time	Rank	Time	Rank
Anthony Nesty	Men's 100 m butterfly	53.50	3 Q	53.00 OR	1st place, gold medalist(s)
Anthony Nesty	Men's 200 m butterfly	2:00.17	8 Q	2:00.80	8

== See also ==
- Suriname at the Pan American Games
