= Suriname at the 1972 Summer Olympics =

- IOC code: SUR
- NOC: Suriname Olympic Committee

in Munich
- Competitors: 2 in 2 sports
- Flag bearer: Sammy Monsels
- Medals: Gold 0 Silver 0 Bronze 0 Total 0

Summer Olympics appearances (overview)
- 1960; 1964; 1968; 1972; 1976; 1980; 1984; 1988; 1992; 1996; 2000; 2004; 2008; 2012; 2016; 2020; 2024

Suriname, then still a constituent country of the Netherlands, competed at the 1972 Summer Olympics in Munich, West Germany.

== Athletics ==
Men

Athlete	Event	Heat		Semifinal		Final	
Athlete	Event	Result	Rank	Result	Rank	Result	Rank
Sammy Monsels	100 m	10.61	3 Q	10.64	7	did not advance	
Sammy Monsels	200 m	21.26	5 Q	DNS		did not advance	

== Judo ==
Men

Athlete	Event	Round 1	Round 2	Round 3	Round 4	Repechage 1	Repechage 2	Repechage 3	Semifinal	Final / BM	
Athlete	Event	Opposition Result	Opposition Result	Opposition Result	Opposition Result	Opposition Result	Opposition Result	Opposition Result	Opposition Result	Opposition Result	Rank
Iwan Blijd	−63 kg	Marcel Burkhard (SUI); L 0000-1000	did not advance								
