= Suriname at the 1992 Summer Olympics =

- IOC code: SUR
- NOC: Suriname Olympic Committee

in Barcelona
- Competitors: 6 (5 men and 1 woman) in 3 sports
- Flag bearer: Tommy Asinga
- Medals Ranked 54th: Gold 0 Silver 0 Bronze 1 Total 1

Summer Olympics appearances (overview)
- 1960; 1964; 1968; 1972; 1976; 1980; 1984; 1988; 1992; 1996; 2000; 2004; 2008; 2012; 2016; 2020; 2024

Suriname was represented at the 1992 Summer Olympics in Barcelona, Catalonia, Spain by the Suriname Olympic Committee.

In total, six athletes including five men and one woman represented Suriname in three different sports including athletics, cycling and swimming.

Suriname won one medal at the games after Anthony Nesty claimed bronze in the swimming men's 100 m butterfly.

== Competitors ==
In total, six athletes represented Suriname at the 1992 Summer Olympics in Barcelona, Catalonia, Spain across three different sports.

| Sport | Men | Women | Total |
|---|---|---|---|
| Athletics | 1 | 1 | 2 |
| Cycling | 1 | 0 | 1 |
| Swimming | 3 | 0 | 3 |
| Total | 5 | 1 | 6 |

== Medalists ==
In total, Suriname won one medal at the games after Anthony Nesty claimed bronze in the swimming men's 100 m butterfly.

| Medal | Name | Sport | Event | Date |
|---|---|---|---|---|
| Bronze | Anthony Nesty | Swimming | Men's 100 m butterfly | 27 July |

== Athletics ==
In total, two Surinamese athletes participated in the athletics events – Tommy Asinga in the men's 800 m and Letitia Vriesde in the women's 800 m and the women's 1,500 m.

The heats for the women's 800 m took place on 31 July 1992. Vriesde finished second in her heat in a time of one minute 59.93 seconds as she advanced to the semi-finals. The semi-finals took place on 1 August 1992. Vriesde finished fifth in her semi-final in a time of one minute 58.28 and she did not advance to the final.

The heats for the men's 800 m took place on 1 August 1992. Asinga finished fourth in his heat in a time of one minute 47.23 seconds and he advanced to the semi-finals as one of the fastest losers. The semi-finals took place on 2 August 1992. Asinga finished eighth in his semi-final in a time of one minute 46.78 and he did not advance to the final.

The heats for the women's 1,500 m took place on 5 August 1992. Vriesde finished fifth in her heat in a time of four minutes 10.63 seconds as she advanced to the semi-finals. The semi-finals took place on 6 August 1992. Vriesde finished eighth in her semi-final in a time of four minutes 9.64 and she did not advance to the final.

| Athlete | Event | Heat | | Semifinal | | Final | |
| Athlete | Event | Result | Rank | Result | Rank | Result | Rank |
|---|---|---|---|---|---|---|---|
| Tommy Asinga | Men's 800 m | 1:47.23 | 4 Q | 1:46.78 | 12 | did not advance | |
| Letitia Vriesde | Women's 800 m | 1:59.93 | 2 Q | 1:58.28 | 9 | did not advance | |
| Letitia Vriesde | Women's 1,500 m | 4:10.63 | 5 Q | 4:09.64 | 20 | did not advance | |

== Cycling ==
In total, one Surinamese athlete participated in the cycling events – Realdo Jessurun in the men's road race.

The men's road race took place on 2 August 1992. Jessurun did not finish.

| Athlete | Event | Time | Rank |
|---|---|---|---|
| Realdo Jessurun | Men's road race | DNF | |

== Swimming ==
In total, three Surinamese athletes participated in the swimming events – Enrico Linscheer, Giovanni Linscheer and Anthony Nesty.

The heats for the men's 100 m butterfly took place on 27 July 1992. Giovanni Linscheer finished sixth in his heat in a time of 56.2 seconds which was ultimately not fast enough to advance to the finals. Nesty won his heat in a time of 53.89 and he advanced to the final. The final took place later the same day. Nesty recorded a time of 53.41 to finish third and win the bronze medal.

The heats for the men's 100 m freestyle took place on 28 July 1992. Giovanni Linscheer finished fifth in his heat in a time of 51.82 seconds which was ultimately not fast enough to advance to the finals. Enrico Linscheer finished second in his heat in a time of 52.94 seconds which was ultimately not fast enough to advance to the finals.

The heats for the men's 50 m freestyle took place on 30 July 1992. Enrico Linscheer finished second in his heat in a time of 23.74 seconds which was ultimately not fast enough to advance to the finals.

| Athlete | Event | Heat | | Final B | | Final | |
| Athlete | Event | Time | Rank | Time | Rank | Time | Rank |
|---|---|---|---|---|---|---|---|
| Enrico Linscheer | 50 m freestyle | 23.74 | 33 | did not advance | | | |
| Enrico Linscheer | 100 m freestyle | 52.94 | 47 | did not advance | | | |
| Giovanni Linscheer | 100 m freestyle | 51.82 | 37 | did not advance | | | |
| Giovanni Linscheer | 100 m butterfly | 56.20 | 37 | did not advance | | | |
| Anthony Nesty | 100 m butterfly | 53.89 | 3 Q | did not advance | | 53.41 | Bronze medal |
