= Suriname at the 1976 Summer Olympics =

- IOC code: SUR
- NOC: Suriname Olympic Committee

in Montreal
- Competitors: 3 in 2 sports
- Flag bearer: Ricardo Elmont
- Medals: Gold 0 Silver 0 Bronze 0 Total 0

Summer Olympics appearances (overview)
- 1960; 1964; 1968; 1972; 1976; 1980; 1984; 1988; 1992; 1996; 2000; 2004; 2008; 2012; 2016; 2020; 2024

Suriname competed at the 1976 Summer Olympics in Montreal, Quebec, Canada.

== Athletics ==
Men

Athlete	Event	Heat		Semifinal		Final	
Athlete	Event	Result	Rank	Result	Rank	Result	Rank
Roy Bottse	800 m	1:49.85	7	did not advance			
Sammy Monsels	100 m	10.58	1 Q	10.61	6	did not advance	
Sammy Monsels	200 m	21.60	4 Q	21.29	5	did not advance	

== Judo ==
Men

Athlete	Event	Round 1	Round 2	Round 3	Round 4	Repechage 1	Repechage 2	Final / BM	
Athlete	Event	Opposition Result	Opposition Result	Opposition Result	Opposition Result	Opposition Result	Opposition Result	Opposition Result	Rank
Ricardo Elmont	−80 kg	Valeriy Dvoynikov (URS); L 0000-1000	BYE			Süheyl Yesilnur (TUR); L 0000-1000	did not advance		
