= Suriname at the Olympics =

- IOC code: SUR
- NOC: Suriname Olympic Committee
- Website: www.surolympic.org
- Medals Ranked 113th: Gold 1 Silver 0 Bronze 1 Total 2

Summer appearances
- 1960; 1964; 1968; 1972; 1976; 1980; 1984; 1988; 1992; 1996; 2000; 2004; 2008; 2012; 2016; 2020; 2024

Suriname first participated at the Olympic Games in 1960, and has sent athletes to compete in most Summer Olympic Games since then except for the 1964 Games and the 1980 Games when the nation participated in the American-led boycott of the 1980 Summer Olympics, also it has never participated in the Winter Olympic Games. The nation has won two Olympic medals, both by swimmer Anthony Nesty.

The National Olympic Committee for Suriname was created in 1959 and recognized by the International Olympic Committee that same year.

== Medal tables ==
=== Medals by Summer Games ===
Games	Athletes	Gold	Silver	Bronze	Total	Rank
1960 Rome	1	0	0	0	0	–
1964 Tokyo	did not participate					
1968 Mexico City	1	0	0	0	0	–
1972 Munich	2	0	0	0	0	–
1976 Montreal	3	0	0	0	0	–
1980 Moscow	boycotted					
1984 Los Angeles	5	0	0	0	0	–
1988 Seoul	6	1	0	0	1	29
1992 Barcelona	6	0	0	1	1	54
1996 Atlanta	7	0	0	0	0	–
2000 Sydney	4	0	0	0	0	–
2004 Athens	4	0	0	0	0	–
2008 Beijing	4	0	0	0	0	–
2012 London	5	0	0	0	0	–
2016 Rio de Janeiro	6	0	0	0	0	–
2020 Tokyo	3	0	0	0	0	–
2024 Paris	5	0	0	0	0	–
2028 Los Angeles	future event					
2032 Brisbane	future event					
Total		1	0	1	2	113

=== Medals by sport ===
Sport	Gold	Silver	Bronze	Total
Swimming	1	0	1	2
Totals (1 entries)	1	0	1	2

== List of medalists ==
Medal	Name	Games	Sport	Event
Gold	Anthony Nesty	1988 Seoul	Swimming	Men's 100 metre butterfly
Bronze	Anthony Nesty	1992 Barcelona	Swimming	Men's 100 metre butterfly

== See also ==
- List of flag bearers for Suriname at the Olympics
- Category:Olympic competitors for Suriname
- Suriname at the Paralympics
