= Suriname at the 1968 Summer Olympics =

- IOC code: SUR
- NOC: Suriname Olympic Committee

in Mexico City
- Competitors: 1 in 1 sport
- Flag bearer: Eddy Monsels
- Medals: Gold 0 Silver 0 Bronze 0 Total 0

Summer Olympics appearances (overview)
- 1960; 1964; 1968; 1972; 1976; 1980; 1984; 1988; 1992; 1996; 2000; 2004; 2008; 2012; 2016; 2020; 2024

Suriname competed at the 1968 Summer Olympics in Mexico City, Mexico, from 12 to 27 October 1968. It was the nation's second appearance at the Summer Olympics, since its debut at the 1960 Summer Olympics in Rome. The Suriname delegation consisted of a single athlete, Eddy Monsels, competing in the athletics event. Suriname did not win any medals at the Games.

== Background ==
The Suriname Olympic Committee was founded in 1956 and was recognized by the International Olympic Committee (IOC) in 1959. The nation made its Olympic debut at the 1960 Summer Olympics in Rome, and missed the 1964 Summer Olympics at Tokyo. The 1968 Summer Olympics marked the country's second appearance at the Summer Olympics.

The 1968 Summer Olympics were held in Mexico City, Mexico, between 12 and 27 October 1968. Eddy Monsels was the flag bearer for Suriname during the opening ceremony. Suriname did not win a medal at the Games.

== Competitors ==
The Suriname delegation consisted of a single athlete.

Sport	Men	Women	Total
Athletics	1	0	1
Total	1	0	1

== Athletics ==
Suriname qualified one athlete, Eddy Monsels, who competed in the men's 100 metres. Monsels made his Olympic debut at the Games. He had won several junior sprint titles in Suriname, and the Netherlands. (Note: Suriname was a colony of the Netherlands till 1975.) On 14 May 1967, he set a Surinamese record for 100-yard running with a time of 10.1 seconds, having previously set several records over the past year. In August 1967, he won two gold medals in the Kingdom Games. On 10 October 1967, he set a 100 metres record with a time of 10.6 seconds, and further lowered the time to 10.5 seconds on 22 May 1968. He won the senior 100 metres title in August 1968, which helped him qualify for the Olympics.

Monsels was the first Surinamese athlete to actually take part in the Games. When Suriname made its debut in the 1960 Summer Olympics, Wim Esajas, the lone athlete representing the nation missed his event.

The athletics events were held at the Estadio Olímpico Universitario in Mexico City. In the eighth heats of the preliminary round, he finished fifth with a time of 10.48 seconds and advanced further. In the semifinals, he finished eighth and last in the fourth heat, and failed to qualify for the finals.

Athlete	Event	Heat		Semifinal		Final	
Athlete	Event	Result	Rank	Result	Rank	Result	Rank
Eddy Monsels	Men's 100 metres	10.48	5 Q	10.45	8	Did not advance	
