= Swimming at the 2010 South American Games – Women's 50 metre backstroke =

The Women's 50m backstroke event at the 2010 South American Games was held on March 28, with the heats at 10:08 and the Final at 18:00.

== Medalists ==
Gold	Silver	Bronze
Fabíola Molina; Brazil	Jeserik Pinto; Venezuela	Carolina Colorado Henao; Colombia

== Records ==
Standing records prior to the 2010 South American Games
World record	Zhao Jing (CHN)	27.06	Rome, Italy	30 July 2009
Competition Record	Carolina Colorado Henao (COL)	30.14	Buenos Aires, Argentina	17 November 2006
South American record	Fabíola Molina (BRA)	27.70	Rome, Italy	29 July 2009

== Results ==
=== Heats ===
Rank	Heat	Lane	Athlete	Result	Notes
1	3	4	Fabíola Molina (BRA)	28.69	Q CR
2	1	4	Carolina Colorado Henao (COL)	29.48	Q
3	2	5	Jeserik Pinto (VEN)	29.63	Q
4	2	3	Isabella Arcila (COL)	29.94	Q
5	3	5	Cecilia Bertoncello (ARG)	30.42	Q
6	3	3	Diana An Yu Ibarra (ECU)	30.47	Q
7	2	4	Fernanda Alvarenga (BRA)	30.70	Q
7	1	5	Florencia Perotti (ARG)	31.01	Q
9	1	3	Elimar Barrios (VEN)	31.13	
10	3	6	Maria Baez Franco (PAR)	31.34	
11	2	6	Massie Carrillo Yong (PER)	31.41	
12	1	2	Chinyere Pigot (SUR)	32.08	
13	1	6	Maria Mongelos Britez (PAR)	32.27	
14	2	2	Carolina Aguilar Muro (PER)	32.40	
15	2	7	Chandel Domaso (SUR)	32.74	
16	3	2	Carolina Pfeifer (CHI)	33.35	
17	3	7	Karen Torrez Guzman (BOL)	33.68	
18	1	7	Mariana Vaca Diez (BOL)	35.06	

=== Final ===
Rank	Lane	Athlete	Result	Notes
1st place, gold medalist(s)	4	Fabíola Molina (BRA)	28.50	CR
2nd place, silver medalist(s)	3	Jeserik Pinto (VEN)	29.26	
3rd place, bronze medalist(s)	5	Carolina Colorado Henao (COL)	29.75	
4	6	Isabella Arcila (COL)	30.10	
5	2	Cecilia Bertoncello (ARG)	30.16	
6	1	Fernanda Alvarenga (BRA)	30.53	
7	8	Florencia Perotti (ARG)	30.80	
8	7	Diana An Yua Ibarra (ECU)	31.08	
