= Suriname at the 2020 Summer Olympics =

- IOC code: SUR
- NOC: Suriname Olympic Committee

in Tokyo, Japan July 23, 2021 – August 8, 2021
- Competitors: 3 in 3 sports
- Flag bearer (opening): Renzo Tjon-A-Joe
- Flag bearer (closing): N/A
- Medals: Gold 0 Silver 0 Bronze 0 Total 0

Summer Olympics appearances (overview)
- 1960; 1964; 1968; 1972; 1976; 1980; 1984; 1988; 1992; 1996; 2000; 2004; 2008; 2012; 2016; 2020; 2024

Suriname competed at the 2020 Summer Olympics in Tokyo, Japan, from 23 July to 8 August 2021. It was the nation's fourteenth appearance at the Summer Olympics, since its debut at the 1960 Summer Olympics in Rome. The Suriname delegation consisted of three athletes competing in three sports. Suriname did not win any medals at the Games.

== Background ==
The Suriname Olympic Committee was founded in 1956 and was recognized by the International Olympic Committee (IOC) on 25 May 1959 at the IOC Session in Munich. The nation made its first Olympic appearance at the 1960 Summer Olympics in Rome. The 2020 Summer Olympics was the nation's fourteenth appearance at the Summer Olympics.

The 2020 Summer Olympics was held in Tokyo, Japan, between 23 July and 8 August 2021. Originally scheduled to take place from 24 July to 9 August 2020, the Games were postponed due to the COVID-19 pandemic. Swimmer Renzo Tjon-A-Joe was Suriname's flag bearer at the opening ceremony. Suriname did not win a medal at the Games.

== Competitors ==
The Suriname delegation consisted of three athletes.

Sport	Men	Women	Total
Badminton	1	0	1
Cycling	1	0	1
Swimming	1	0	1
Total	3	0	3

== Badminton ==
The qualification was based on the Badminton World Federation (BWF) rankings published on 15 June 2021 for the period between 29 April 2019 and 25 April 2021. Each NOC was permitted to enter a maximum of two players each in the men's and women's singles if both were ranked in the world's top 16. Similar regulations were also applied to the doubles event with each NOC allowed to enter a maximum of two pairs if both are ranked in the top eight. The remaining NOCs were entitled to one qualified per event until the quota for the event was exhausted. However, due to the COVID-19 pandemic, BWF confirmed that the qualification period technically closed on 15 June 2021 as no further play was possible, with the qualification decided by the rankings till the date.

Suriname qualified one badminton player, Sören Opti, for the men's singles event. This was Opti's second participation in the Summer Olympics after his debut in the 2016 Summer Olympics. In the men's singles events held at Musashino Forest Sport Plaza, Opti was eliminated from the competition after he tested positive for COVID-19, and pulled out from the Games.

Athlete	Event	Group Stage			Elimination	Quarterfinal	Semifinal	Final / BM	
Athlete	Event	Opposition Score	Opposition Score	Rank	Opposition Score	Opposition Score	Opposition Score	Opposition Score	Rank
Sören Opti	Men's singles	Shi Yq (CHN); L WO	Abela (MLT); L WO	3	Did not advance				

== Cycling ==
The qualification for track cycling was based on the Union Cycliste Internationale (UCI) rankings, and the track cycling quotas were released by the UCI in March 2020. Suriname entered one rider, Jair Tjon En Fa, to compete in the men's sprint and keirin at the Games. This was Suriname's second ever appearance in track cycling at the Summer Olympics, after Realdo Jessurun's participation in the 1988 Summer Olympics.

The cycling events were held at the Izu Velodrome in Tokyo. In the men's sprint event, the fastest 24 cyclists of the 30 starters went through to the first round. Tjon En Fa finished sixth in the qualifying, and qualified for the next round. In the first round of individual face offs over a three lap or 750 m (2,460 ft) distance, he lost to Maximillian Levy of Germany. While he entered the second round after winning the repechage round, he lost the second round to Harrie Lavreysen of the Netherlands and the subsequent repechage round to be eliminated from the competition.

In the men's keirin event, Tjon En Fa finished sixth in his first round heats, and qualified for the quarterfinals after finishing second in the repechage round. He finished third in the third quarterfinals to advance to the semifinals, where he finished third to advance to the finals. In the finals competed by six riders, he finished fourth, 1.264 seconds behind winner Jason Kenny of Great Britain and missed out on a medal.

Sprint

Athlete	Event	Qualification		Round 1	Repechage 1	Round 2	Repechage 2	Round 3	Repechage 3	Quarterfinals	Semifinals	Final	
Athlete	Event	Time Speed (km/h)	Rank	Opposition Time Speed (km/h)	Opposition Time Speed (km/h)	Opposition Time Speed (km/h)	Opposition Time Speed (km/h)	Opposition Time Speed (km/h)	Opposition Time Speed (km/h)	Opposition Time Speed (km/h)	Opposition Time Speed (km/h)	Opposition Time Speed (km/h)	Rank
Jair Tjon En Fa	Men's sprint	9.472; 76.014	6 Q	Levy (GER); L	Hart (AUS); Xu C (CHN); W 10.016; 71.885	Lavreysen (NED); L	Vigier (FRA); L	Did not advance					

Keirin

Athlete	Event	Round 1	Repechage	Quarterfinals	Semifinals	Final
Athlete	Event	Rank	Rank	Rank	Rank	Rank
Jair Tjon En Fa	Men's keirin	6 R	2 QF	3 SF	3 FA	4

== Swimming ==
As per the Fédération internationale de natation (FINA) guidelines, a NOC was permitted to enter a maximum of two qualified athletes in each individual event, who have achieved the Olympic Qualifying Time (OQT). If the quota was not filled, one athlete per event was allowed to enter, provided they achieved the Olympic Selection Time (OST). The qualifying time standards should have been achieved in competitions approved by World Aquatics in the period between 1 March 2019 to 27 June 2021. FINA also allowed NOCs to enter swimmers (one per gender) under a universality place even if they have not achieved the standard entry times (OQT/OST). Suriname received a universality invitation from FINA to send a male swimmer to the Olympics.

The swimming events were held at the Tokyo Aquatics Centre. Renzo Tjon-A-Joe competed in the men's 50 m freestyle event. He finished 36th overall in the heats and did not advance to the semifinals.

Athlete	Event	Heat		Semifinal		Final	
Athlete	Event	Time	Rank	Time	Rank	Time	Rank
Renzo Tjon-A-Joe	Men's 50 m freestyle	22.56	36	Did not advance			

== See also ==
- Suriname at the 2019 Pan American Games
