= Suriname at the 2004 Summer Olympics =

- IOC code: SUR
- NOC: Suriname Olympic Committee

in Athens
- Competitors: 4 in 2 sports
- Flag bearer: Letitia Vriesde
- Medals: Gold 0 Silver 0 Bronze 0 Total 0

Summer Olympics appearances (overview)
- 1960; 1964; 1968; 1972; 1976; 1980; 1984; 1988; 1992; 1996; 2000; 2004; 2008; 2012; 2016; 2020; 2024

Suriname competed at the 2004 Summer Olympics in Athens, Greece, from 13 to 29 August 2004. It was the nation's tenth appearance at the Summer Olympics, since its debut at the 1960 Summer Olympics in Rome. The Surinamese delegation consisted of four athletes competing in two sports. Suriname did not win any medals at the Games.

== Background ==
The Suriname Olympic Committee was founded in 1956 and was recognized by the International Olympic Committee (IOC) in 1959. The nation made its Olympic debut at the 1960 Summer Olympics in Rome, and has competed in every Summer Olympics since then except in 1964 and 1980. The 2004 Summer Olympics marked the country's tenth appearance at the Summer Olympics.

The 2004 Summer Olympics were held in Athens, Greece, from 13 to 29 August 2004. Sprinter Letitia Vriesde was the flagbearer for Suriname during both the opening and closing ceremonies. Suriname did not win a medal at the Games.

== Competitors ==
The Suriname delegation consisted of four athletes (two men and two women) competing in three sports.

Sport	Men	Women	Total
Athletics	1	1	2
Swimming	1	1	2
Total	2	2	4

== Athletics ==
As per IAAF, a National Olympic Committee (NOC) was allowed to enter up to four qualified athletes in each individual event (maximum of three athletes in each event at the 'A' Standard, and one athlete at the 'B' Standard) if the Olympic Qualifying Standard time was met during the qualifying period. Two Surinamese athletes achieved qualifying standards in the athletics events.

Cornelis Sibe competed in the men's 800 m and Letitia Vriesde in the women's 800 m. Vriesde was an Olympic veteran, having competed in every Olympics since the 1988 Summer Olympics, and was making her fifth and final Olympic appearance. She had won several medals including a silver at the 1995 World Athletics Championships and a bronze at the 2001 World Athletics Championships in the 800 metres event. She had also won a gold, a silver, and a bronze in the Pan American Games and five golds, and a silver in the Central American and Caribbean Games. She also holds a personal best time of 1:56.68 in the 800 metres, set on 13 August 1995, which is ranked amongst the top hundred times for women. This was Sibe's first and only Olympic appearance.

The athletics events were held at the Olympiako Stadio in Athens. In the men's 800 metres, held from 25 to 28 August 2004, Sibe finished eighth and last in heat nine of the preliminary round with a time of two minutes and 0.06 seconds, and did not advance to the semifinal. In the women's 800 metres, held on 20 to 23 August 2004, Vriesde finished fourth and in heat three of the first round and qualified for the semifinals. In the semifinal however, she took more than five seconds longer than the time she set in the first round, and finished eighth and last in her race.

Athlete	Event	Heat		Semifinal		Final	
Athlete	Event	Result	Rank	Result	Rank	Result	Rank
Cornelis Sibe	Men's 800 m	2:00.06	8	Did not advance			
Letitia Vriesde	Women's 800 m	2:01.70	4 q	2:06.95	8	Did not advance	

Key

- Note–Ranks given for track events are within the athlete's heat only
- Q = Qualified for the next round
- q = Qualified for the next round as a fastest loser or, in field events, by position without achieving the qualifying target
- NR = National record
- N/A = Round not applicable for the event
- Bye = Athlete not required to compete in round

== Swimming ==
Suriname entered two swimmers for the Games. Gordon Touw Ngie Tjouw competed in the men's 100 m butterfly and Sade Daal in the women's 50 m freestyle event. This was the first Olympic appearance for Touw Ngie Tjouw, and the first and only appearance for Daal.

The swimming events were held at the Athens Olympic Aquatic Centre in Marousi, Athens. In the men's 100 metre butterfly heat on 19 August 2004, Touw Ngie Tjouw finished 51st amongst the 59 competitors with a time of 56.68 seconds and did not advance to the semi-finals. In the women's 50 metre freestyle heat on 20 August 2004, Daal finished eighth and last in her heat. She was ranked 54th overall with a time of 29.27 seconds and did not advance to the semi-finals.

Athlete	Event	Heat		Semifinal		Final	
Athlete	Event	Time	Rank	Time	Rank	Time	Rank
Gordon Touw Ngie Tjouw	Men's 100 m butterfly	56.68	51	Did not advance			
Sade Daal	Women's 50 m freestyle	29.27	54	Did not advance			

== See also ==
- Suriname at the 2003 Pan American Games
- Suriname at the 2004 Summer Paralympics
