= Iwan Blijd =

Surinamese judoka

Personal information
- Nationality: Surinamese
- Born: 8 May 1953 (age 73)

Sport
- Sport: Judo

Iwan Blijd (born 8 May 1953) is a Surinamese judoka, who represented his country at the 1972 Summer Olympics.

Blijd was just one of two athletes selected to represent Suriname at the 1972 Summer Olympics and was the first Surinamese judoka at the Olympics. He was 19 years old when he competed in the 63 kg event. He was drawn against Marcel Burkhard from Switzerland in the first round; he lost the bout after 5 minutes and therefore did not advance further in the competition.
