= Suriname at the 2024 Summer Olympics =

- IOC code: SUR
- NOC: Suriname Olympic Committee

in Paris, France 26 July 2024 – 11 August 2024
- Competitors: 5 in 4 sports
- Flag bearers (opening): Irvin Hoost and Kaelyn Djoparto
- Flag bearer (closing): Jaïr Tjon En Fa
- Medals: Gold 0 Silver 0 Bronze 0 Total 0

Summer Olympics appearances (overview)
- 1960; 1964; 1968; 1972; 1976; 1980; 1984; 1988; 1992; 1996; 2000; 2004; 2008; 2012; 2016; 2020; 2024

Suriname competed at the 2024 Summer Olympics in Paris, France, from 26 July to 11 August 2024. It was the nation's fifteenth appearance at the Summer Olympics, since its debut at the 1960 Summer Olympics in Rome. The Suriname delegation consisted of five athletes competing in four sports. Suriname did not win any medals at the Games.

== Background ==
The Suriname Olympic Committee was founded in 1956 and was recognized by the International Olympic Committee (IOC) in 1959. The nation made its Olympic debut at the 1960 Summer Olympics in Rome, and has competed in every Summer Olympics except in 1964 and 1980. The 2024 Summer Olympics marked the country's fifteenth appearance at the Summer Olympics.

The 2024 Summer Olympics were held in Paris, France, between 26 July and 11 August 2024. Swimmers Irvin Hoost and Kaelyn Djoparto were the flag bearers for Suriname during the opening ceremony. Cyclist Jaïr Tjon En Fa was the flag bearer for the closing ceremony. Suriname did not win a medal at the Games.

== Competitors ==
The Suriname delegation consisted of five athletes.

Sport	Men	Women	Total
Athletics	1	0	1
Badminton	1	0	1
Cycling	1	0	1
Swimming	1	1	2
Total	4	1	5

== Athletics ==
As per the governing body World Athletics (WA), a NOC was allowed to enter up to three qualified athletes in each individual event if the Olympic Qualifying Standard time was met during the qualifying period between 1 July 2023 to 30 June 2024 at the events approved by the body.

Suriname qualified one athlete, Jalen Lisse, who competed in the men's 100 metres. Lisse made his Olympic debut at the Games. The athletics events were held at the Stade de France in Paris. In the sixth heats of the preliminary round, he finished fourth with a time of 10.64 seconds and did not advance further.

Athlete	Event	Preliminary		Round 1		Semifinal		Final	
Athlete	Event	Result	Rank	Result	Rank	Result	Rank	Result	Rank
Jalen Lisse	Men's 100 m	10.64 PB	4	Did not advance					

== Badminton ==
The Olympic qualification was based on the Badminton World Federation (BWF) rankings for the period between 1 May 2023 and 28 April 2024. Each NOC was permitted to enter a maximum of two players each in the singles event if both were ranked in the world's top 16 with one quota place to other NOCs until the roster of thirty-eight players has been completed.

Suriname qualified one badminton player, Sören Opti, for the men's singles event. This was the third consecutive Olympic participation for Opti since his debut at the 2016 Summer Olympics. He was eliminated from the competition in the previous Olympics after he tested positive for COVID-19, and could not compete in the Games. He had also represented Suriname in the 2014 and 2018 Central American and Caribbean Games.

The badminton events were held at Porte de la Chapelle Arena in Paris. In the group stage, Opti lost both his first match against Shi Yuqi of China in direct sets. In the second match against Giovanni Toti, Opti retired during the second set, and did not advance to the knockout rounds.

Athlete	Event	Group stage			Elimination	Quarter-final	Semi-final	Final / BM	
Athlete	Event	Opposition Score	Opposition Score	Rank	Opposition Score	Opposition Score	Opposition Score	Opposition Score	Rank
Sören Opti	Men's singles	Shi YQ (CHN); L (5–21, 7–21)	Toti (ITA); L (8–21, 1–4^{r})	3	Did not advance				

== Cycling ==
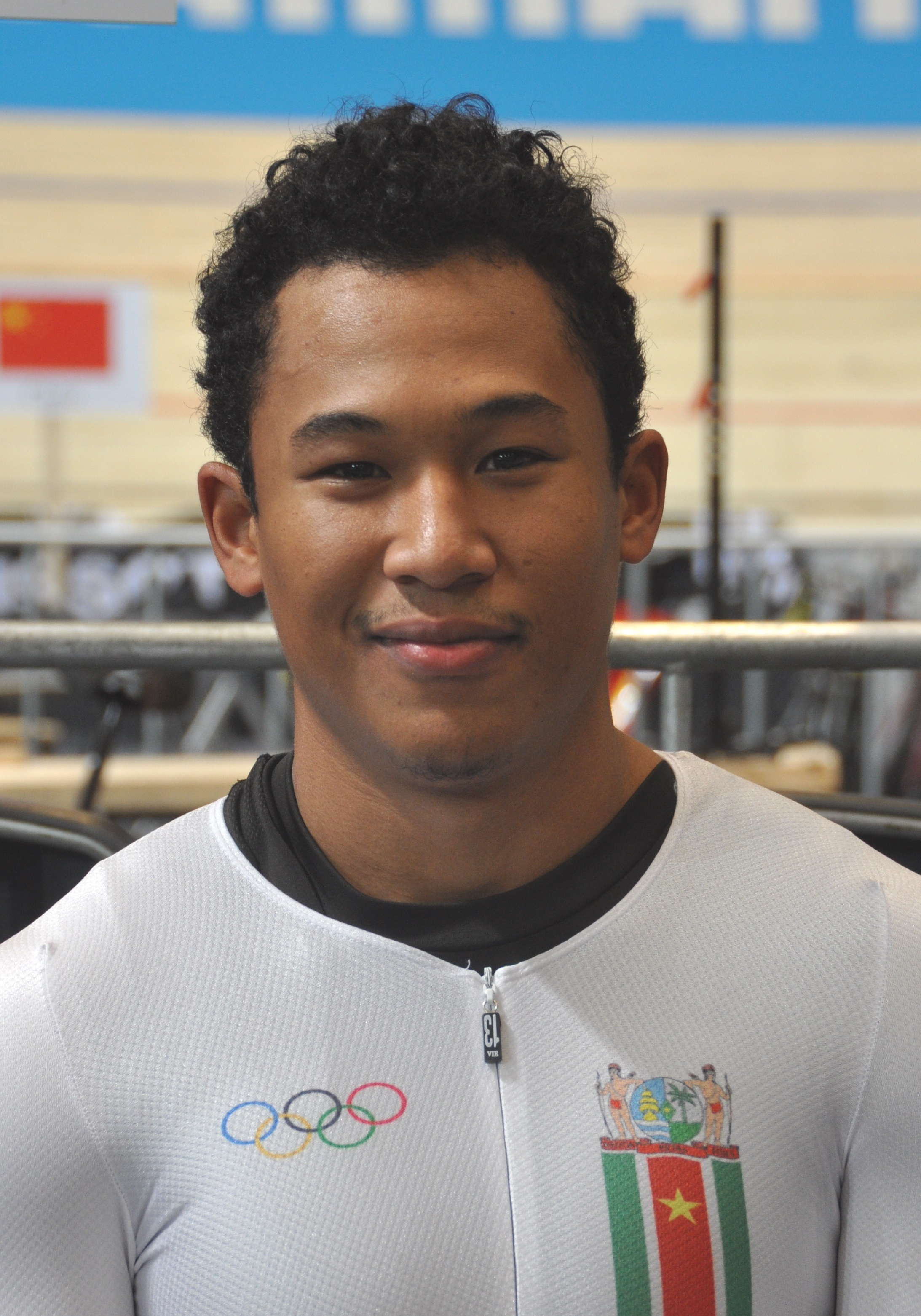
Jaïr Tjon En Fa competed in his second Olympics

Each National Olympic Committee (NOC) could enter a maximum of fourteen track cyclists with a specific number of riders allotted per event including two per gender in sprint and keirin events. All the quota places offered in track cycling were based on the points obtained in the Union Cycliste Internationale (UCI) raking during the 2022 to 2024 season. Suriname entered one cyclist, Jaïr Tjon En Fa, in the men's sprint and keirin events. It was his second participation in the Summer Olympics after his debut at the 2020 Summer Olympics.

The track cycling events were held at Vélodrome de Saint-Quentin-en-Yvelines at Montigny-le-Bretonneux. In the sprint event, the qualifying race takes place over three and a half laps, and Tjon En Fa was placed 23rd amongst the 30 participants, and made it to the next round. The main events took place over three lap distance. In the first round, he lost the face off against Matthew Richardson. He prevailed in the three men repechage round to make it to the second round. However, he lost the second round and the subsequent repechage round to bow out of the competition.

In the keirin event, he finished fourth in the first round, and in the same position in the repechage rounds, and did not advance further.

Sprint

Athlete	Event	Qualification		Round 1	Repechage 1	Round 2	Repechage 2	Round 3	Repechage 3	Quarterfinals	Semifinals	Finals / BM	
Athlete	Event	Time Speed (km/h)	Rank	Opposition Time Speed (km/h)	Opposition Time Speed (km/h)	Opposition Time Speed (km/h)	Opposition Time Speed (km/h)	Opposition Time Speed (km/h)	Opposition Time Speed (km/h)	Opposition Time Speed (km/h)	Opposition Time Speed (km/h)	Opposition Time Speed (km/h)	Rank
Jaïr Tjon En Fa	Men's sprint	9.637; 74.712	23 Q	Richardson (AUS); L 9.815; 74.496	Spiegel (GER); Zhou (CHN); W 9.999; 72.007	Iakovlev (ISR); L 10.052; 72.764	Rudyk (POL); L 10.927; 72.963	Did not advance					

Keirin

Athlete	Event	Round 1	Repechage	Quarterfinals	Semifinals	Final
Athlete	Event	Rank	Rank	Rank	Rank	Rank
Jaïr Tjon En Fa	Men's keirin	4 R	4	Did not advance		

== Swimming ==
As per the World Aquatics guidelines, a NOC was permitted to enter a maximum of two qualified athletes in each individual event, who have achieved the Olympic Qualifying Time. To fill further slots, one athlete per event was allowed to enter if they meet the Olympic Selection Time. If the quotas were not filled, NOCs were allowed to enter two swimmers (one per gender) under a universality place even if no one achieved the standard entry times. Suriname entered two swimmers at the Games through universality places.

Irvin Hoost competed in the men's 100 metre freestyle, while Kaelyn Djoparto competed in the women's 50 metre freestyle event. Both of them were making their Olympic debut at the Games. However, both of them did not make it out of the qualifying heats.

Athlete	Event	Heat		Semifinal		Final	
Athlete	Event	Time	Rank	Time	Rank	Time	Rank
Irvin Hoost	Men's 100 m freestyle	52.99	68	Did not advance			
Kaelyn Djoparto	Women's 50 m freestyle	29.99	61	Did not advance			

Qualifiers for the latter rounds (Q) of all events were decided on a time only basis, therefore positions shown are overall results versus competitors in all heats.

== See also ==
- Suriname at the Pan American Games
