= Siegfried Cruden =

Surinamese sprinter

Personal information
- Nationality: Surinamese
- Born: 28 November 1959 (age 66)

Sport
- Sport: Sprinting
- Event: 400 metres

Siegfried Cruden (born 28 November 1959) is a Surinamese former sprinter. He competed in the men's 400 metres at the 1984 Summer Olympics.

Olympic Games
Preceded by Ricardo Elmont	Flagbearer for Suriname; Los Angeles 1984	Succeeded by Anthony Nesty
