= Suriname at the 2000 Summer Olympics =

- IOC code: SUR
- NOC: Suriname Olympic Committee

in Sydney
- Competitors: 4 (2 men and 2 women) in 2 sports
- Flag bearer: Letitia Vriesde
- Medals: Gold 0 Silver 0 Bronze 0 Total 0

Summer Olympics appearances (overview)
- 1960; 1964; 1968; 1972; 1976; 1980; 1984; 1988; 1992; 1996; 2000; 2004; 2008; 2012; 2016; 2020; 2024; 2028

Suriname competed at the 2000 Summer Olympics in Sydney, Australia, from 15 September to 1 October 2000. It was the nation's ninth appearance at the Summer Olympics, since its debut at the 1960 Summer Olympics in Rome. The Surinamese delegation consisted of four athletes competing in two sports. Suriname did not win any medals at the Games.

== Background ==
The Suriname Olympic Committee was founded in 1956 and was recognized by the International Olympic Committee (IOC) in 1959. The nation made its Olympic debut at the 1960 Summer Olympics in Rome, and has competed in every Summer Olympics since then except in 1964 and 1980. The 2000 Summer Olympics marked the country's ninth appearance at the Summer Olympics.

The 2000 Summer Olympics were held in Sydney, Australia, from 15 September to 1 October 2000. Sprinter Letitia Vriesde was the flagbearer for Suriname during the opening ceremony. Suriname did not win a medal at the Games.

== Competitors ==
The Suriname delegation consisted of four athletes (two men and two women) competing in three sports.

Sport	Men	Women	Total
Athletics	1	1	2
Swimming	1	1	2
Total	2	2	4

== Athletics ==
Two Surinamese athletes qualified for the Games. Guillermo Dongo competed in the men's 100 m and Letitia Vriesde in the women's 800 m. Vriesde was an Olympic veteran, having competed in every Olympics since the 1988 Summer Olympics, and was making her fourth Olympic appearance. She had won several medals including a silver at the 1995 World Athletics Championships and a bronze at the 2001 World Athletics Championships in the 800 metres event. She had also won a gold, a silver, and a bronze in the Pan American Games and five golds, and a silver in the Central American and Caribbean Games. This was Dongo's first and only Olympic appearance.

The athletics events were held at the Olympic Stadium, Olympic Park, Sydney. The men's 800 metres event was held from 22 to 23 September 2000. Dongo set a time of 11.1 seconds, way below his personal best mark of 10.5 seconds set earlier in the year. He finished eighth and last in heat eleven of the preliminary round and did not advance to the semifinal.

In the women's 800 metres, held on 22 to 25 September 2000, Vriesde competed in heat two of the first round. Vriesde, who holds a personal best time of 1:56.68 in the 800 metres, set on 13 August 1995, which is ranked amongst the top hundred times for women, took more than two minutes and two seconds to complete her race. She finished fourth in the heat and did not make it to the semifinals either.

Athlete	Event	Heat		Semifinal		Final	
Athlete	Event	Result	Rank	Result	Rank	Result	Rank
Guillermo Dongo	Men's 100 m	11.1	87	Did not advance			
Letitia Vriesde	Women's 800 m	2:02.09	18	Did not advance			

== Swimming ==
Suriname entered two swimmers for the Games. Mike Fung A Wing competed in the men's 100 m backstroke event while Carolyn Adel competed in the women's 200 m and 400 m individual medley events. This was the second consecutive Olympic appearance for both Fung a Wing and Adel, having made their debuts at the previous 1996 Summer Olympics at Atlanta. Adel had earlier won a bronze medal at the 1999 Pan American Games in the 400 metres individual medley event. She won six gold and a silver at the 1998 Central American and Caribbean Games.

The swimming events were held at the Sydney International Aquatic Centre in Sydney Olympic Park. In the men's 100 metre backstroke preliminary heat held on 17 September 2000, Fung A Wing competed in Heat 2. Though he finished second in his heat with a time of 59.06 seconds, he was ranked 48th amongst the 59 competitors and did not advance to the semi-finals.

In the women's 400 metre individual medley preliminary rounds held on 16 September 2000, Adel finished seventh in the third heat, and was ranked 22nd out of the 30 participants. Her time of 4:57.90 was not enough to progress to the next round. In the 200 metre individual medley event held two days later, she finished third in the second heat with a time of 2 minutes and 19.17 seconds. However, she was ranked 22nd overall, and did not advance to the semi-finals.

Athlete	Event	Heat		Semifinal		Final	
Athlete	Event	Time	Rank	Time	Rank	Time	Rank
Mike Fung A Wing	Men's 100 m backstroke	59.06	48	Did not advance			
Carolyn Adel	Women's 200 m individual medley	2:19.17	22	Did not advance			
Carolyn Adel	Women's 400 m individual medley	4:57.90	22	Did not advance			
