= Paulo Camacho =

Portuguese swimmer

Personal information
- Born: 3 August 1970 (age 55)

Sport
- Sport: Swimming

Paulo Camacho (born 3 August 1970) is a Portuguese butterfly swimmer. He competed in the men's 100 metre butterfly at the 1988 Summer Olympics.
