= Gordon Touw Ngie Tjouw =

Surinamese swimmer

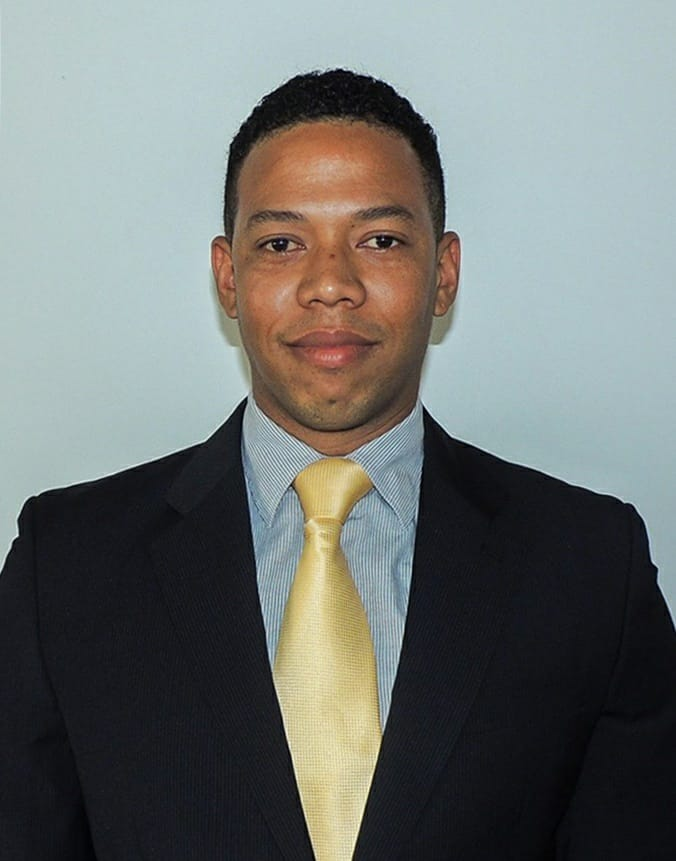

Personal information
- Born: June 9, 1985 (age 41)

Sport
- Sport: Swimming
- College team: Indian River State College

Gordon Touw Ngie Tjouw (born 9 June 1985) is an Olympic swimmer from Suriname. He swam for Suriname at the 2004 and 2008 Olympics.

He swam and studied at the USA's Indian River Community College.
