= Cornelis Sibe =

Surinamese middle-distance runner

Personal information
- Nationality: Surinamese
- Born: 22 April 1983 (age 43)

Sport
- Sport: Middle-distance running
- Event: 800 metres

Cornelis Sibe (born 22 April 1983) is a Surinamese middle-distance runner. He competed in the men's 800 metres at the 2004 Summer Olympics.
