= Swimming at the 1988 Summer Olympics – Men's 100 metre butterfly =

Men's 100 metre butterfly at the Games of the XXIV Olympiad
- Venue: Jamsil Indoor Swimming Pool
- Date: 20 September 1988 (heats); 21 September 1988 (finals)
- Competitors: 55 from 38 nations
- Winning time: 53.00 OR

Medalists
1st place, gold medalist(s)		Anthony Nesty	Suriname
2nd place, silver medalist(s)		Matt Biondi	United States
3rd place, bronze medalist(s)		Andy Jameson	Great Britain

The men's 100 metre butterfly event at the 1988 Summer Olympics took place between 20 and 21 September at the Jamsil Indoor Swimming Pool in Seoul, South Korea.

== Records ==
Prior to this competition, the existing world and Olympic records were as follows.

World record	Pablo Morales (USA)	52.84	Orlando, United States	23 June 1986
Olympic record	Michael Gross (FRG)	53.08	Los Angeles, United States	30 July 1984

The following records were established during the competition:

Date	Round	Name	Nation	Time	Record
21 September	Final A	Anthony Nesty	Suriname	53.00	OR

== Results ==
=== Heats ===
Rule: The eight fastest swimmers advance to final A (Q), while the next eight to final B (q).

Rank	Heat	Name	Nationality	Time	Notes
1	5	Andy Jameson	Great Britain	53.34	Q
2	7	Matt Biondi	United States	53.46	Q
3	6	Anthony Nesty	Suriname	53.50	Q, NR
4	7	Michael Gross	West Germany	53.78	Q
5	7	Jon Sieben	Australia	53.85	Q
6	6	Vadim Yaroshchuk	Soviet Union	54.17	Q
7	5	Tom Ponting	Canada	54.31	Q
8	6	Jay Mortenson	United States	54.44	Q
9	7	Benny Nielsen	Denmark	54.52	q
10	5	Anthony Mosse	New Zealand	54.63	q
11	5	Vlastimil Černý	Canada	54.66	q
12	5	Zheng Jian	China	54.69	q
13	6	Neil Cochran	Great Britain	54.75	q
14	7	Hiroshi Miura	Japan	54.82	q
15	5	Rafał Szukała	Poland	54.83	q
16	5	Shen Jianqiang	China	54.86	q
17	7	Martin Herrmann	West Germany	55.20	
18	6	José Luis Ballester	Spain	55.27	
19	7	Frank Drost	Netherlands	55.38	
20	4	David Wilson	Australia	55.54	
21	7	Robert Wolf	Czechoslovakia	55.73	
22	6	Leonardo Michelotti	Italy	55.83	
23	6	Konstantin Petrov	Soviet Union	55.84	
24	4	Yukinori Tanaka	Japan	56.19	
25	4	Ross Anderson	New Zealand	56.31	
26	4	Eduardo de Poli	Brazil	56.37	
27	6	Ludovic Depickère	France	56.47	
28	5	Valerio Giambalvo	Italy	56.57	
29	2	Reinhold Leitner	Austria	56.72	
30	4	Théophile David	Switzerland	56.77	
31	3	Joseph Eric Buhain	Philippines	57.17	
32	3	Wladimir Ribeiro	Brazil	57.25	
33	2	Mabílio Albuquerque	Portugal	57.30	
34	1	Paul Yelle	Barbados	57.36	
35	4	Ang Peng Siong	Singapore	57.41	
36	3	Theodoros Griniazakis	Greece	57.56	
37	3	Paulo Camacho	Portugal	57.62	
38	3	Park Yeong-cheol	South Korea	57.74	
39	3	Tsang Yi Ming	Hong Kong	57.84	
40	2	Urbano Zea	Mexico	57.89	
41	4	Carlos Romo	Mexico	58.04	
42	2	Pedro Lima	Angola	59.21	
43	2	Graham Thompson	Zimbabwe	1:00.13	
44	2	Kristan Singleton	Virgin Islands	1:00.97	
45	2	William Cleveland	Virgin Islands	1:01.10	
46	1	Sergio Fafitine	Mozambique	1:01.15	
47	1	Plutarco Castellanos	Honduras	1:02.69	
48	1	Salam Mohamed Abdul Salam	Bangladesh	1:03.69	
49	1	Mohamed Bin Abid	United Arab Emirates	1:06.25	
50	1	Trevor Ncala	Swaziland	1:06.85	
51	1	Jorge Gomes	Angola	1:09.60	
	1	Salvador Vassallo	Puerto Rico	DNS	
	2	Oon Jin Gee	Singapore	DNS	
	3	Matjaž Kozelj	Yugoslavia	DNS	
	4	Michael Adam	Austria	DNS	

=== Finals ===
==== Final B ====
Rank	Lane	Name	Nationality	Time	Notes
9	8	Shen Jianqiang	China	54.52	
10	5	Anthony Mosse	New Zealand	54.63	
11	4	Benny Nielsen	Denmark	54.77	
12	3	Vlastimil Černý	Canada	54.79	
13	1	Rafał Szukała	Poland	54.80	
14	7	Hiroshi Miura	Japan	54.98	
15	6	Zheng Jian	China	55.00	
16	2	Neil Cochran	Great Britain	55.22	

==== Final A ====
Rank	Lane	Name	Nationality	Time	Notes
1st place, gold medalist(s)	3	Anthony Nesty	Suriname	53.00	OR
2nd place, silver medalist(s)	5	Matt Biondi	United States	53.01	
3rd place, bronze medalist(s)	4	Andy Jameson	Great Britain	53.30	
4	2	Jon Sieben	Australia	53.33	
5	6	Michael Gross	West Germany	53.44	
6	8	Jay Mortenson	United States	54.07	
7	1	Tom Ponting	Canada	54.09	
8	7	Vadim Yaroshchuk	Soviet Union	54.60	
