= Yigal Kopinsky =

Surinamese judoka

Personal information
- Nationality: Surinamese
- Born: 16 October 1985 (age 40)

Sport
- Sport: Judo

Yigal Kopinsky (born 16 October 1985) is a Surinamese judoka.

He competed at the 2016 Summer Olympics in Rio de Janeiro, in the men's 66 kg but lost to Houd Zourdani of Algeria in the second round.

Kopinsky is Jewish.
