= Wim Esajas =

Surinamese middle-distance runner

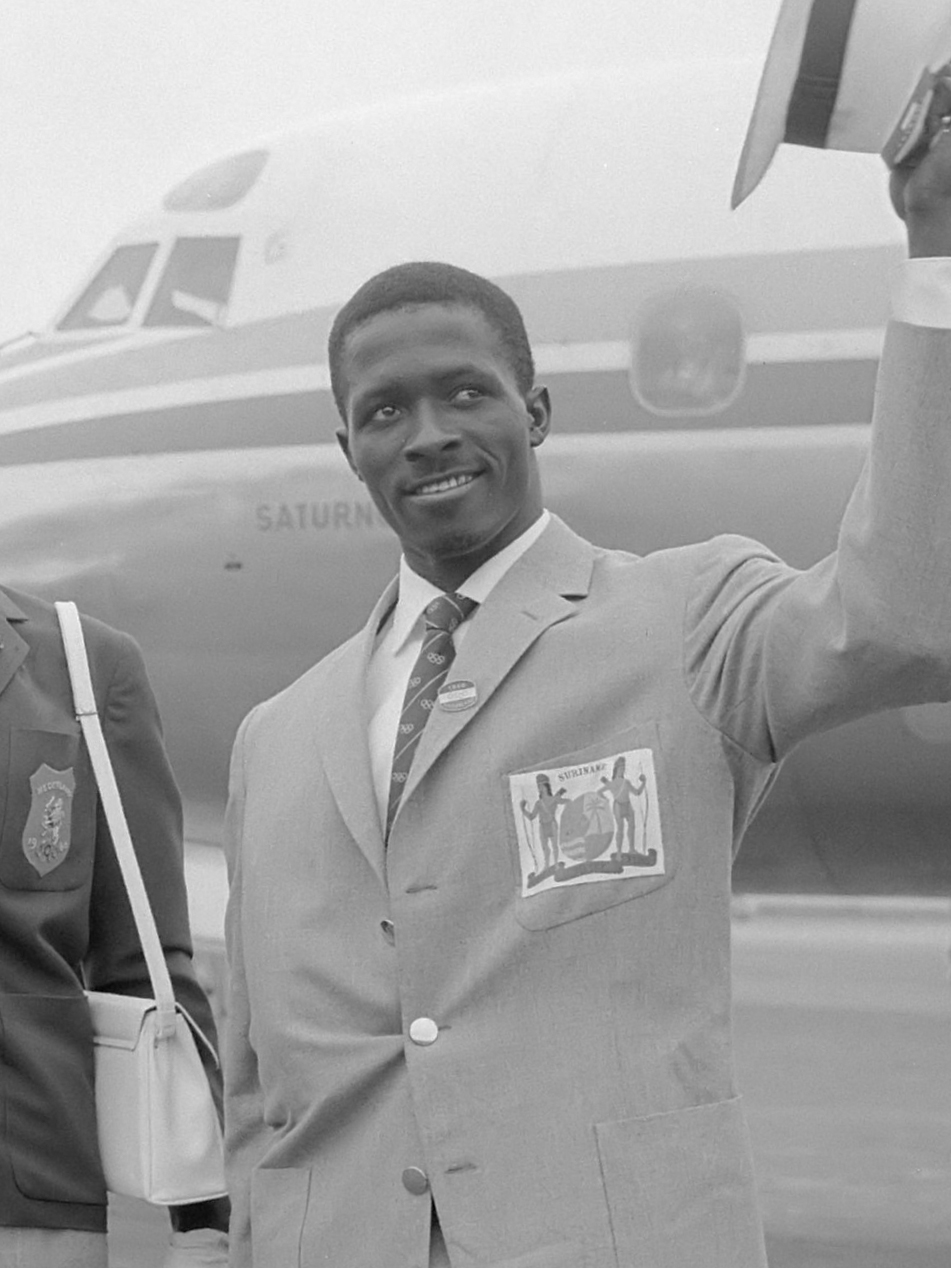
- Wim Esajas in 1960

Personal information
- Born: 16 April 1935
- Died: 30 April 2005 (aged 70) Paramaribo, Suriname

Sport
- Sport: Running

Siegfried Willem "Wim" Esajas (16 April 1935 – 30 April 2005) was a Surinamese middle-distance runner who qualified for the athletics at the men's 800 m event at the 1960 Summer Olympics in Rome, Italy and was supposed to be the first Surinamese Olympian. Esajas missed the event, and it was alleged that he overslept, whereas he was actually given an incorrect starting time for his event by Fred Glans, the head of Suriname's Olympic delegation.

Esajas was a multiple national record holder in the 800 m, 1500 m and 3000 m events in the 1950s, and was selected as the Surinamese Sportman of the Year in 1956. He retired from sport after the 1960 Olympics, graduated in horticulture from a college in Deventer, the Netherlands, and returned to Suriname to grow flowers.

In 2005, Suriname's Olympic Committee presented Esajas with a plaque honoring him as Suriname's first Olympian and with a letter of apology for the mistake made by its official in 1960. Esajas died on 30 April 2005 of an undisclosed illness. He had a son, Werner.

Olympic Games
Preceded by None	Flagbearer for Suriname; Rome 1960	Succeeded by Eddy Monsels
