= Eddy Monsels =

Surinamese sprinter (1948–2023)

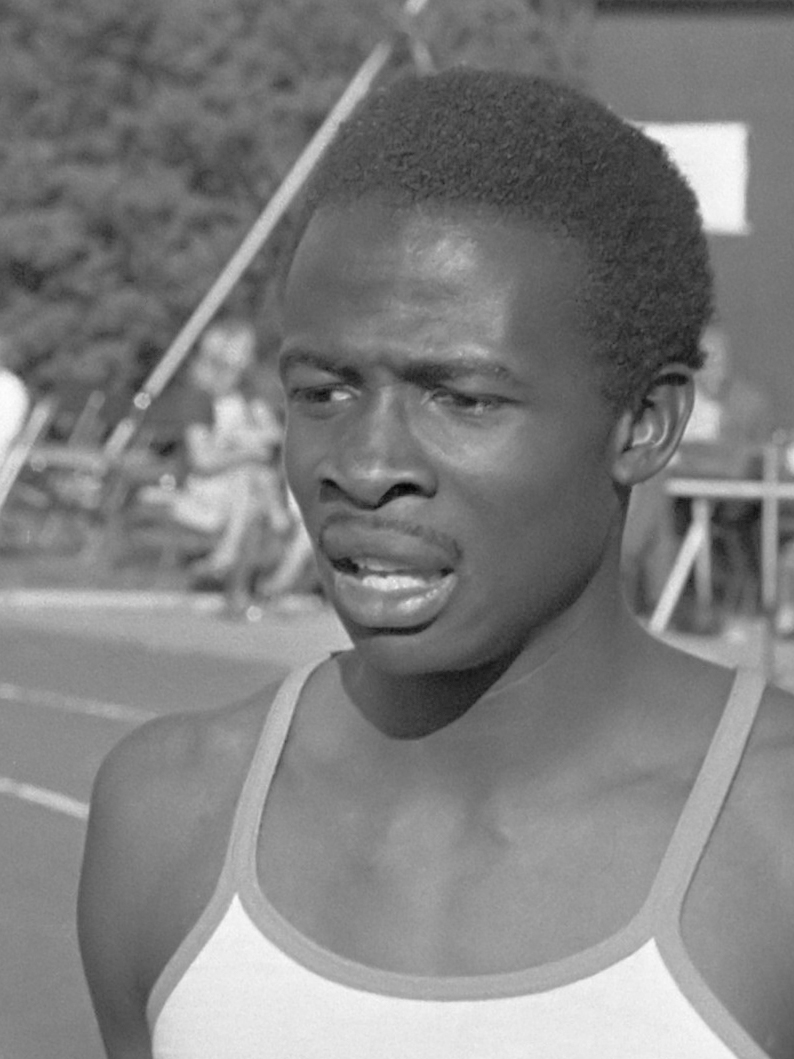
- Monsels in 1970

Personal information
- Nationality: Surinamese
- Born: Eduard George Monsels; 24 January 1948 Paramaribo, Surinam
- Died: 1 November 2023 (aged 75)
- Height: 1.77 m (5 ft 10 in)
- Weight: 65 kg (143 lb)

Sport
- Sport: Sprinting
- Event: 100 metres

Eduard "Eddy" George Monsels (24 January 1948 – 1 November 2023) was a Surinamese sprinter. He competed in the men's 100 metres at the 1968 Summer Olympics, becoming the first competitor to actually appear for Suriname in the Olympics. He is the brother of sprinter Sammy Monsels. Eddy Monsels studied civil engineering at Leiden University. Monsels died on 1 November 2023, at the age of 75.

He is the brother of sprinter Sammy Monsels.

Olympic Games
| Preceded by Wim Esajas | Flagbearer for Suriname; Mexico City 1968 | Succeeded by Sammy Monsels |
