= Ricardo Elmont =

Surinamese judoka (1954–2013)

Personal information
- Nationality: Surinamese
- Born: 16 September 1954 Paramaribo, Surinam
- Died: 2 September 2013 (aged 58) Amsterdam, Netherlands

Sport
- Sport: Judo
Medal record
Representing Suriname
Central American and Caribbean Games
Bronze medal – third place	1974 Santo Domingo	Middleweight

Ricardo Willy Elmont (16 September 1954 – 2 September 2013) was a Surinamese judoka, who represented his country at the 1976 Summer Olympics.

Elmont took up judo seriously in 1970 and went on to win the national middleweight title three years running from 1972 to 1974, he went on to win a bronze medal in the 1974 Central American and Caribbean Games and finished fourth four years later at the 1978 Central American and Caribbean Games, between those two appearances he competed for Suriname at the 1976 Summer Olympics in Montreal, Canada, he entered the 80 kg event, in the first round he lost to Soviet Valeriy Dvoynikov, he then went on to the repechage but lost his contest against Süheyl Yesilnur from Turkey so didn't advance any further. He also competed at the 1975 Pan American Games in Mexico City.

In 1979, Elmont left Suriname and moved to the Netherlands, where he had two sons, Guillaume Elmont and Dex Elmont who both went on to represent the Netherlands in judo at three Olympics each.

Elmont was awarded the Suriname Sportsperson of the Year in 1974.

Elmont died at age 58.

Olympic Games
Preceded by Sammy Monsels	Flagbearer for Suriname; Montreal 1976	Succeeded by Siegfried Cruden
