= Chinyere Pigot =

Surinamese swimmer

Personal information
- Born: May 1, 1993 (age 33) Paramaribo, Suriname
- Height: 5.7 ft 0 in (1.74 m)
- Weight: 56 kg (123 lb)

Sport
- Country: Suriname
- Sport: Swimming
- Event(s): 50m Freestyle, 100m Freestyle
Medal record
Women's swimming
Representing Suriname
South American Games
Bronze medal – third place	2014 Santiago	50 m freestyle
Bronze medal – third place	2014 Santiago	100 m freestyle
- Updated on 11 March 2014

Chinyere Pigot is a Surinamese swimmer living in Miami, Florida, who attended the University of Connecticut and participated on a collegiate level. Pigot competed at the 2008 Summer Olympics at age fifteen on Suriname's behalf. She used to attend Doral Academy Charter High School in 2011. She was Suriname's flag bearer at the opening ceremony of the 2012 Summer Olympics.

Olympic Games
Preceded by Anthony Nesty	Flagbearer for Suriname; London 2012	Succeeded by Soren Opti
