= Sammy Monsels =

Surinamese sprinter

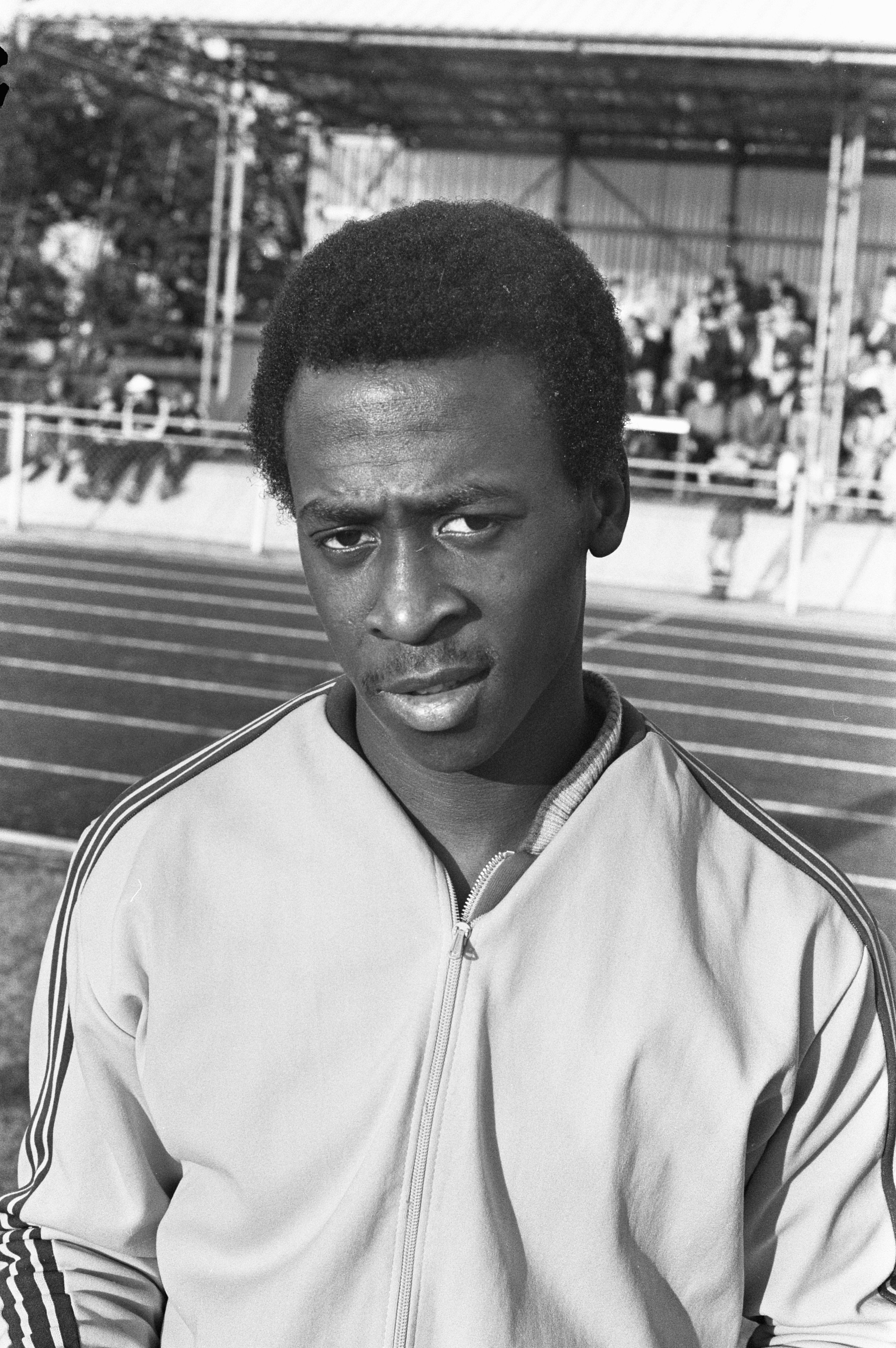
- Sammy Monsels in 1972

Personal information
- Nationality: Surinamese
- Born: Samuel Monsels; 2 August 1953 (age 72) Paramaribo, Surinam
- Height: 1.74 m (5 ft 9 in)
- Weight: 63 kg (139 lb)

Sport
- Sport: Sprinting
- Event(s): 100 metres, 200 metres
- Club: Gazelle Paramaribo; Amsterdamsche Atletiek Club

Samuel "Sammy" Monsels (born 2 August 1953) is a Surinamese former sprinter and current athletics trainer. He competed in the 100 metres and 200 metres at the 1972 Summer Olympics and the 1976 Summer Olympics. He is the brother of sprinter Eddy Monsels.

== Athletics ==
Monsels grew up in Suriname and attended Mulo there. He came to the Netherlands in 1971 to compete in the Kingdom Games, and remained in the Netherlands to undergo training as a technical specialist. In Paramaribo, Monsels was a member of the 'Gazelle' athletics association.

In 1971 Monsels was Surinamese champion in the 100 metres and 200 metres at both the senior level (11.0 seconds and 22.3 seconds) and the junior level (11.0 and 22.5).

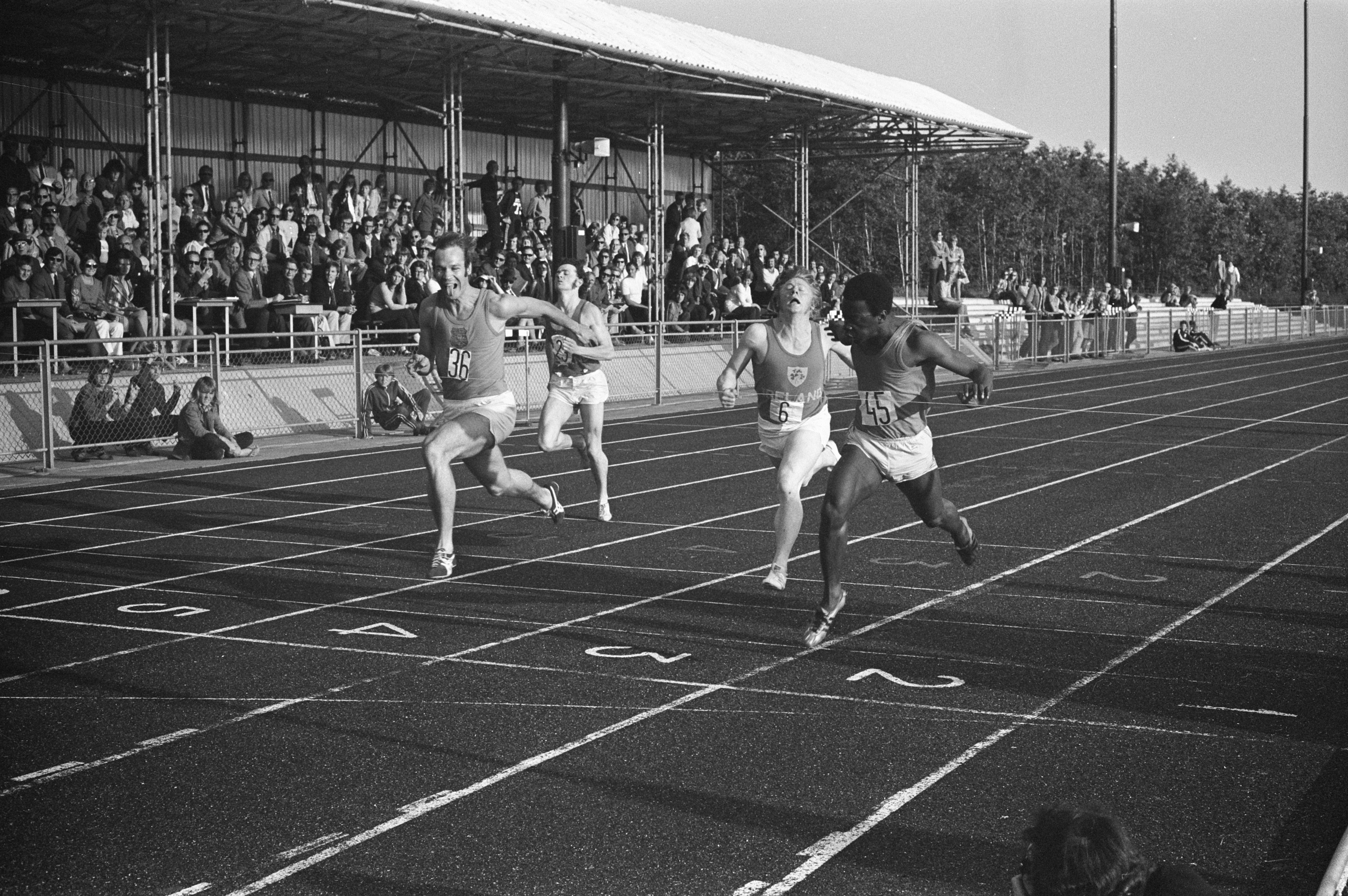
Monsels (far right) at the Netherlands-Ireland meet in Drachten in 1972.

Between 1971 and 1983 Monsels won seven Dutch sprint championships in the 60 metres (indoor) and the 100 and 200 metres (outdoor). Representing the Netherlands, Monsels reached the final of the 60 metres at the 1973 European Athletics Indoor Championships in Rotterdam, finishing fifth. In 1972 and 1976 he competed in the Olympic Games, representing Suriname, reaching the second round of the 100 metres and 200 metres on both occasions. In the late 1970s Monsels quit competitive athletics for a while, but returned in the early 1980s. In 1982 he represented Suriname at the Central American and Caribbean Games in Havana.

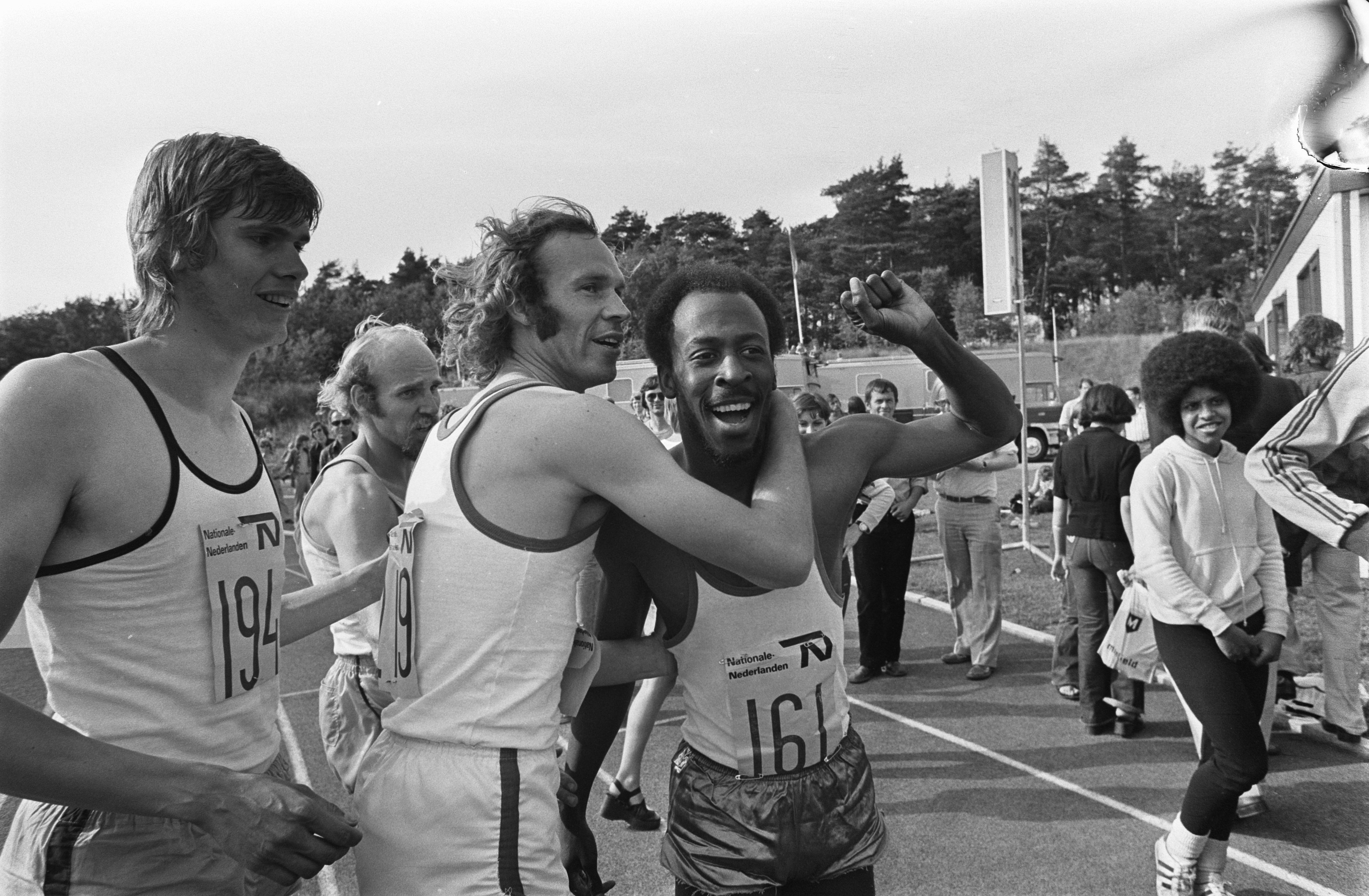
Monsels in 1975 after winning the Dutch 200 metres title in Papendal.

As late as 1990, Monsels competed in the Netherlands national indoor athletics championships in The Hague, finishing third in the 60 metres with a time of 6.89 seconds, behind Emiel Mellaard and Frank Perri.

== Military ==
In 1974 Monsels was a tank driver in the Royal Netherlands Army. In 1975 he returned to Suriname from the Netherlands as the country became independent. He became a sports instructor in the Suriname National Army. After the 1980 coup, he received a promotion and became sports chief in the Surinamese army. In 1983, he acted as an intermediary between strongman Dési Bouterse and the exiled former President Henk Chin A Sen. In 1987 he left the Surinamese army and moved to the Netherlands.

== Singer ==
In 1988, Monsels released a reggae-pop single called "No Bombs, No Guns, All We Need Is Peace And Harmony".

== Trainer ==
In 1992, Monsels founded Atletiek Vereniging Bijlmer, an athletics club in Bijlmermeer and was trainer and president of the association until 1997. Then in 1999 he founded Continental Sport, another athletics club in the area. He again was trainer and president.

== December murders ==
In 2002, after questioning by Surinamese judge Albert Ramnewash, Monsels said he was in Fort Zeelandia on 8 December 1982 but was not involved in the killings.

== Netherlands championships ==
Outdoor

Distance	Year
100 m	1975, 1983
200 m	1972, 1975

Indoor

Distance	Year
60 m	1971, 1972, 1973

== Personal records ==
Distance	Time	Date	Place
100 m	10.49 s	19 July 1981	Nijmegen
200 m	21.03 s	26 August 1981	Koblenz

Olympic Games
Preceded by Eddy Monsels	Flagbearer for Suriname; Munich 1972	Succeeded by Ricardo Elmont
