= Kirsten Nieuwendam =

Surinamese sprinter

Personal information
- Born: August 26, 1991 (age 34) Paramaribo, Suriname

Sport
- Sport: Track and field
- Club: Penn State Nittany Lions

Kirsten Nieuwendam (born August 26, 1991) is a Surinamese athlete, who attended St. Thomas Aquinas High School in Fort Lauderdale, Florida, and currently attends Pennsylvania State University in State College, Pennsylvania. Nieuwendam broke the national Women's 200 metres record at the 2008 Summer Olympics with a time of 24.46 seconds, despite being eliminated in the first round. She competed in the Women's 200 metres event at the 2012 Summer Olympics, but ranked 46th and was again eliminated in the first round.

== See also ==
- List of Pennsylvania State University Olympians
