= Marcel Burkhard =

Swiss judoka

Personal information
- Nationality: Swiss
- Born: 27 December 1951 (age 73)
- Occupation: Judoka

Sport
- Sport: Judo

Profile at external databases
- JudoInside.com: 8666

Marcel Burkhard (born 27 December 1951) is a Swiss judoka. He competed at the 1972 Summer Olympics and the 1980 Summer Olympics.
