= Realdo Jessurun =

Surinamese cyclist

Personal information
- Born: 5 September 1969 (age 57)

Cycling career
- Sport: Cycling

Realdo Kenneth Jessurun (born 5 September 1969) is a Surinamese former cyclist. He competed at the 1988 Summer Olympics and the 1992 Summer Olympics.
