= Jurgen Themen =

Surinamese sprinter

Personal information
- Born: October 26, 1985 (age 40) Paramaribo, Suriname
- Height: 1.72 m (5 ft 7 1/2 in)
- Weight: 75 kg (165 lb)

Sport
- Country: Suriname
- Sport: Athletics
- Event: 100 metres

Achievements and titles
- Personal bests: 100 m: 10.13 s NR; 200 m: 21.25 s
- Updated on 21 January 2015

Jurgen Themen (born 26 October 1985) is a Surinamese sprinter who specializes in the 100 metres.

== Biography ==
He competed at the 2007 World Championships, the 2008 Olympic Games and the 2009 World Championships without progressing to the second round. At the 2012 Summer Olympics he finished first in his preliminary heat, but could only finish fifth in his next heat. At the 2016 Summer Olympics he finished eight in his heat and did not advance.

His personal best time is 10.38 seconds, achieved at the 2012 Surinamese Olympic Trials. The time was also a new Surinamese national record, breaking the old one of 10.48 seconds.

== Personal bests ==
- 100 m: 10.13 s (wind: +1.6 m/s) – (United States) Bradenton, 28 May 2016
- 200 m: 21.25 s (wind: +1.6 m/s) – (United States) Spearfish, 8 May 2016

== International competitions ==
Year	Competition	Venue	Position	Event	Notes
Representing Suriname
2007	South American Championships	São Paulo, Brazil	13th (h)	100 m	11.05 (wind: -0.8 m/s)
2007	South American Championships	São Paulo, Brazil	14th (h)	200 m	22.29 (wind: +0.7 m/s)
2007	Pan American Games	Rio de Janeiro, Brazil	25th (h)	100 m	11.13
2007	Pan American Games	Rio de Janeiro, Brazil	–	200 m	DNF
2007	World Championships	Osaka, Japan	47th (h)	100 m	10.96
2008	Olympic Games	Beijing, China	54th (h)	100 m	10.61
2009	South American Championships	Lima, Peru	8th (h)	100 m	10.77
2009	South American Championships	Lima, Peru	6th	200 m	DNF
2009	World Championships	Berlin, Germany	75th (h)	100 m	11.24
2011	Central American and Caribbean Championships	Mayagüez, Puerto Rico	23rd (h)	100 m	10.99
2011	Universiade	Shenzhen, China	40th (h)	100 m	10.87
2011	Universiade	Shenzhen, China	42nd (h)	200 m	22.14
2011	World Championships	Daegu, South Korea	49th (h)	100 m	10.94
2011	Pan American Games	Guadalajara, Mexico	31st (h)	100 m	10.71
2012	Olympic Games	London, United Kingdom	44th (h)	100 m	10.53 (wind: -1.4 m/s)
2014	Pan American Sports Festival	Mexico City, Mexico	15th (h)	100m	11.05 A (wind: -1.6 m/s)
2014	Pan American Sports Festival	Mexico City, Mexico	17th (h)	200m	22.77 A (wind: -0.6 m/s)
2015	South American Championships	Lima, Peru	4th (h)	200m	22.11 (wind: -1.1 m/s)
2016	Olympic Games	Rio de Janeiro, Brazil	58th (h)	100 m	10.47
2018	Central American and Caribbean Games	Barranquilla, Colombia	18th (h)	100 m	10.55
