= Anthony Nesty =

Surinamese swimmer (born 1967)

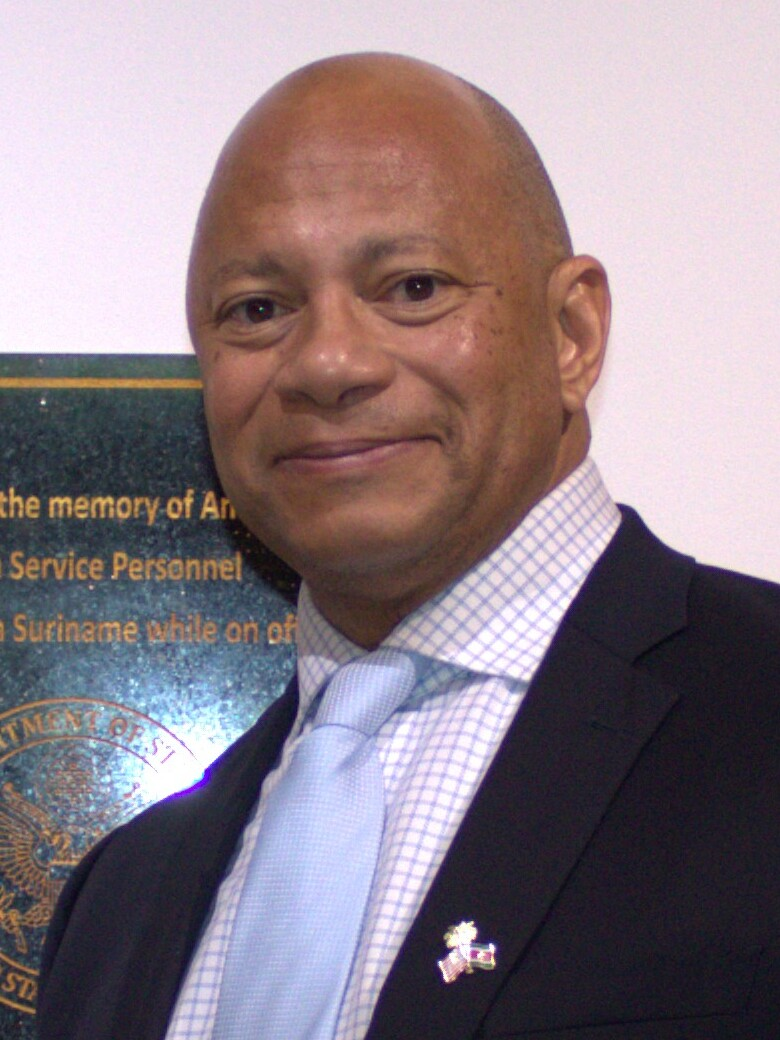
- Nesty in 2025

Personal information
- Full name: Anthony Conrad Nesty
- National team: Suriname
- Born: November 25, 1967 (age 58) Port of Spain, Trinidad and Tobago
- Height: 5 ft 11 in (180 cm)
- Weight: 172 lb (78 kg)

Sport
- Sport: Swimming
- Strokes: Butterfly
- College team: University of Florida (U.S.); B.A. 1994
Medal record
Men's swimming
Representing Suriname
Olympic Games
Gold medal – first place	1988 Seoul	100 m butterfly
Bronze medal – third place	1992 Barcelona	100 m butterfly
World Championships (LC)
Gold medal – first place	1991 Perth	100 m butterfly
Pan Pacific Championships
Gold medal – first place	1989 Tokyo	100 m butterfly
Pan American Games
Gold medal – first place	1987 Indianapolis	100 m butterfly
Gold medal – first place	1991 Havana	100 m butterfly
Silver medal – second place	1991 Havana	200 m butterfly
Bronze medal – third place	1987 Indianapolis	200 m butterfly
Goodwill Games
Gold medal – first place	1990 Seattle	100 m butterfly

Anthony Nesty
Biographical details
- Education: University of Florida

Coaching career (HC unless noted)
- 1996-1998: Swim Florida Swim Club
- 1998-1999: U of Florida; Asst. Men's Coach
- 2004: Suriname National Swim Team
- 2006-present: U of Florida
- 2008: Suriname Olympic Team
- 2011: U.S. National Team; 2011 World Univ. Games
- 2021: U.S. Olympic Men's Team; Asst. Coach
- 2024: U.S. Olympic Men's Team; Named Head Coach in '23

Accomplishments and honors

Championships
- 8 SEC Titles

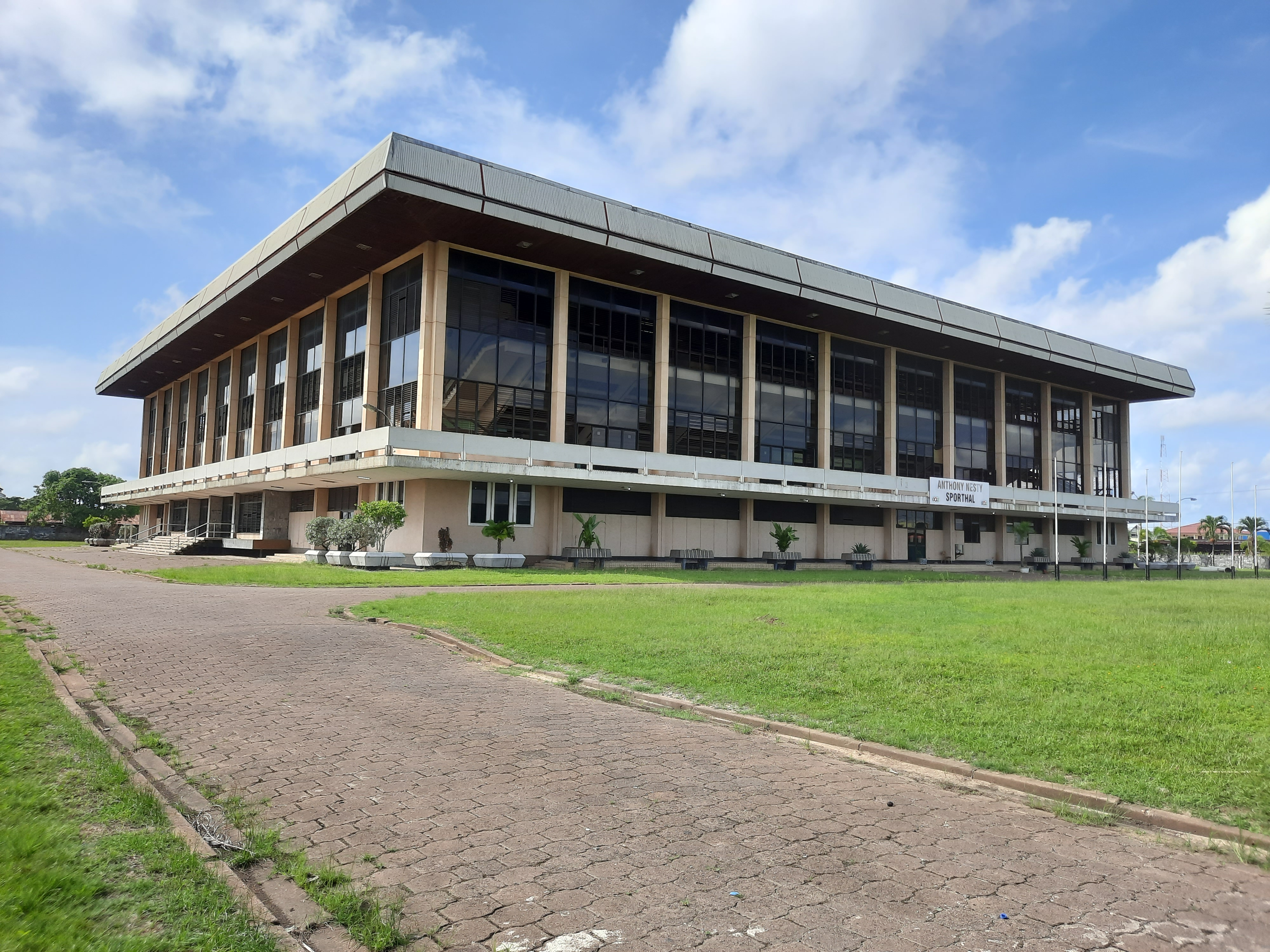
Anthony Nesty Sporthal, Paramaribo

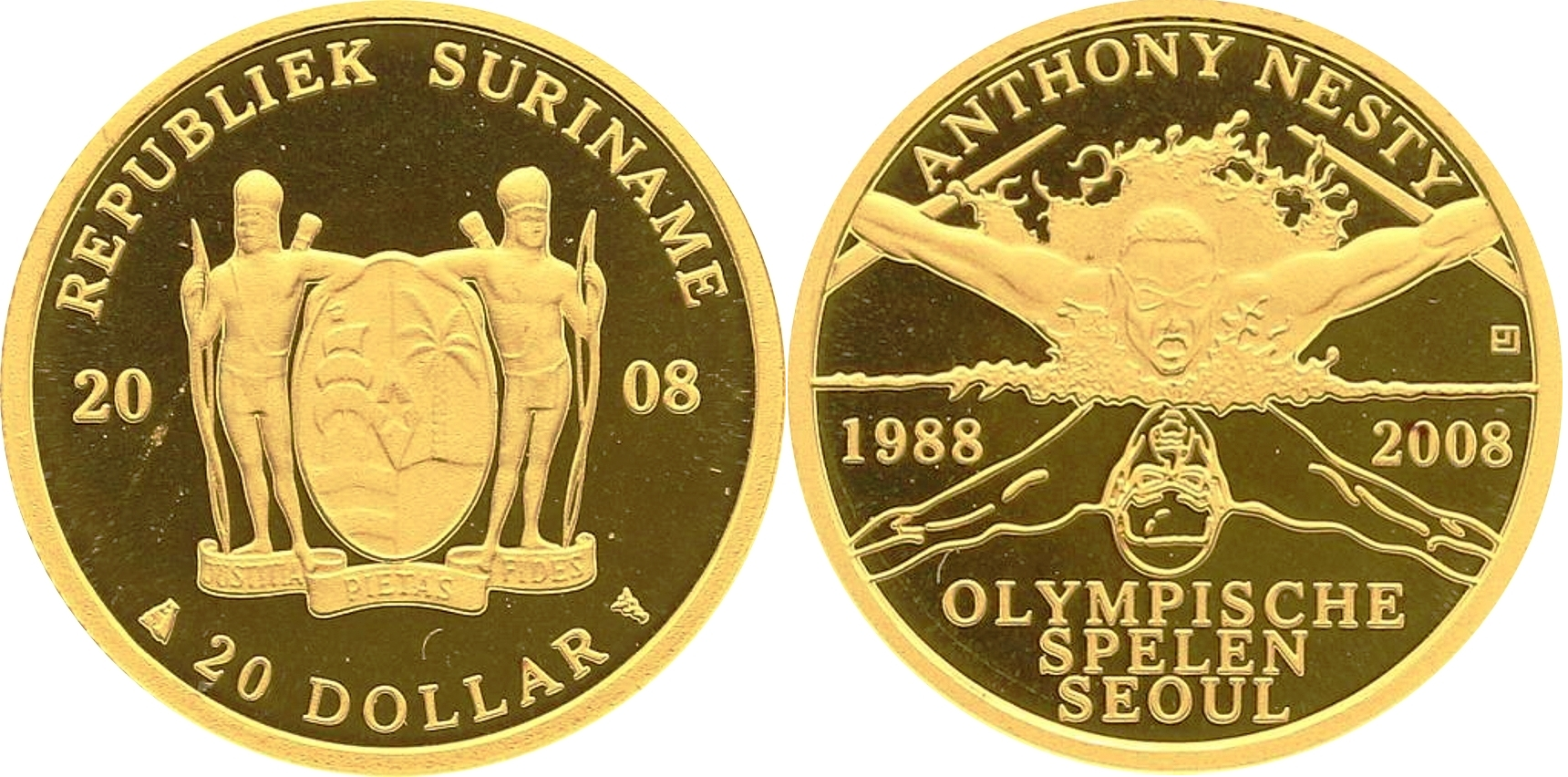
Commemorative medal of 20 SR$, 2008

Anthony Conrad Nesty (born November 25, 1967) is a former competition swimmer from Suriname who was an Olympic gold medallist in the 100-metre butterfly event in 1988. He is currently the head coach of the Florida Gators men's and women's swimming team at the University of Florida, where he attended school.

In September 2023, Nesty was named the head coach for the US men's swimming team at the 2024 Summer Olympics in Paris.

== Early years ==
Anthony Nesty was born in Port of Spain in Trinidad and Tobago in 1967, the youngest of five children in his family. Nesty's family migrated to Suriname when he was seven months old, and he started swimming at the age of 5. Nesty trained and competed in Suriname and the Caribbean through the beginning of his teenage years. He represented Suriname along with his sister, Pauline, at the 1983 Pan American Games. After placing twenty-first in the 100-metre butterfly at the 1984 Summer Olympics in Los Angeles at just 16 years old, Nesty enrolled in The Bolles School in Jacksonville, Florida, a prep school with an athletic program known for training elite, world-class swimmers. While training under Bolles coach Gregg Troy, Nesty broke the prep school 100-yard butterfly record held by Pablo Morales. Breaking Morales's record was the beginning of prominent successes for Nesty. He graduated from the Bolles School in 1987.

== International swimming career ==
Nesty returned to international competition at the 1987 Pan American Games in Indianapolis, Indiana, winning a gold medal in the 100-metre butterfly and a bronze medal in the 200-metre butterfly.

At the 1988 Summer Olympics in Seoul, Korea, Nesty edged American favorite Matt Biondi by one one-hundredth of a second to win the 100-metre butterfly; he finished the event in 53.00 seconds and Biondi in 53.01. Nesty is the only Olympic medal winner from Suriname and after winning his Olympic gold medal, he was unbeaten in the 100-metre butterfly event for three years. Nesty was the first black male athlete and only the second black athlete to win an individual Olympic medal in swimming following Enith Brigitha at the 1976 Summer Olympics, and only the second South American swimmer to win an Olympic gold medal after Alberto Zorrilla in the 1928 Summer Olympics.

Nesty's victory in Seoul was a momentous social and political event for Afro-Caribbeans. The Suriname government commemorated his gold-medal performance on a stamp and on gold and silver coins. A 25-guilders bank note portraying an illustration of a butterfly swimmer was printed in his honor. Surinam Airways named one of its planes after Nesty (this plane was destroyed in an accident while operating as Surinam Airways Flight 764), and the indoor stadium in Paramaribo was renamed for him.

Nesty won gold medals in the 100-metre butterfly at the Goodwill Games in 1990 and the FINA World Aquatics Championships in 1991. At the 1991 Pan American Games in Havana, Cuba, he again won a gold medal in 100-metre butterfly and a silver in the 200-metre butterfly. He attempted to defend his 1988 Olympic gold medal in the 100-metre butterfly at the 1992 Summer Olympics in Barcelona, Spain, but finished with a third-place bronze. At the 2008 Summer Olympics Parade of Nations of the 2008 Summer Olympics in Beijing, while long retired from competition as an athlete himself, Nesty was invited to be Suriname's flag bearer at the opening ceremony.

Nesty was inducted into the International Swimming Hall of Fame (ISHOF) as an "Honor Swimmer" in 1998, and the University of Florida Athletic Hall of Fame as a "Gator Great" in 2002.

== College swimming career ==
After winning his gold medal in Seoul, Nesty accepted an athletic scholarship to attend the University of Florida in Gainesville, Florida, where he enjoyed a successful swimming career with the Florida Gators swimming and diving team under coach Randy Reese and coach Skip Foster from 1989 to 1992. During his four years of National Collegiate Athletic Association (NCAA) competition, he won three consecutive NCAA individual championships in the 100-yard butterfly (1990, 1991, 1992), one in the 200-yard butterfly (1990), and one as a member of the team's 400-yard medley relay team (1991), and received sixteen All-American honors. Nesty also won eleven Southeastern Conference (SEC) titles—five in individual races and six as a member of Gators relay teams.

Nesty graduated from the University of Florida with his bachelor's degree in 1994.

== Coaching career ==
In the mid-1990s, Nesty returned to the Bolles School as a member of the swim coaching staff, while also serving as head coach at Nease High School in Jacksonville.

Nesty was named the assistant men's swimming coach for the University of Florida in 1998 and associate head coach for the Florida Gators men's swimming team in 2006. On April 13, 2021, the university announced that Nesty would henceforth also be head coach of the Florida Gators women's swimming team. In November 2021, Caeleb Dressel would move under Nesty's college group at the University of Florida from his former long-time coach Gregg Troy. Notable swimmers currently under Nesty's direction include Katie Ledecky, Bobby Finke, and Kieran Smith.

In June 2021, Nesty was named assistant coach for the U.S. Men's Olympic Swim Team. In February 2022, he was named head coach of the U.S. Men's Swim Team for the 2022 FINA World Championships in Budapest.

In September 2023, Nesty was named the head coach for the US men's team at the 2024 Summer Olympics in Paris, France, with Todd DeSorbo as women's head coach.

== See also ==
- Florida Gators
- List of Olympic medalists in swimming (men)
- List of University of Florida alumni
- List of University of Florida Olympians
- List of University of Florida Athletic Hall of Fame members
- List of World Aquatics Championships medalists in swimming (men)

Olympic Games
Preceded by Siegfried Cruden	Flagbearer for Suriname; Seoul 1988	Succeeded by Tommy Asinga
Preceded by Letitia Vriesde	Flagbearer for Suriname; Beijing 2008	Succeeded by Chinyere Pigot
