= Suriname Olympic Committee =

National Olympic Committee

- Country: Suriname
- [[|]]
- Code: SUR
- Created: 1959
- Recognized: 1959
- Continental Association: PASO
- President: Ramon Tjon-A-Fat
- Secretary General: Dennis Mac Donald
- Website: www.surolympic.org

The Suriname Olympic Committee (Dutch: Surinaams Olympisch Comité; IOC code: SUR) is the National Olympic Committee representing Suriname.

== Logo ==
Former logo

Present logo
