= 1999 Pan Pacific Swimming Championships – Men's 200 metre breaststroke =

Men's 200 metre backstroke at the 1999 Pan Pacific Swimming Championships
- Venue: Sydney International Aquatic Centre
- Dates: August 25, 1999 (heats & semifinals); August 26, 1999 (final)
- Competitors: 24 from 8 nations
- Winning time: 2:12.98

Medalists
gold medal	Simon Cowley	Australia
silver medal	Tom Wilkens	United States
bronze medal	Terence Parkin	South Africa

The men's 200 metre breaststroke competition at the 1999 Pan Pacific Swimming Championships took place on August 25–26 at the Sydney International Aquatic Centre. The last champion was Kurt Grote of US.

This race consisted of four lengths of the pool, all in breaststroke.

== Records ==
Prior to this competition, the existing world and Pan Pacific records were as follows:

World record	Mike Barrowman (USA)	2:10.16	Barcelona, Spain	July 29, 1992
Pan Pacific Championships record	Mike Barrowman (USA)	2:11.96	Edmonton, Canada	August 25, 1991

== Results ==
All times are in minutes and seconds.

KEY:	q	Fastest non-qualifiers	Q	Qualified	CR	Championships record	NR	National record	PB	Personal best	SB	Seasonal best

=== Heats ===
The first round was held on August 25.

Rank	Name	Nationality	Time	Notes
1	Simon Cowley	Australia	2:15.43	Q
2	Ryan Mitchell	Australia	2:15.67	Q
3	Tom Wilkens	United States	2:15.73	Q
4	Terence Parkin	South Africa	2:16.34	Q
5	Akira Hayashi	Japan	2:16.88	Q
6	Regan Harrison	Australia	2:16.98	Q
7	Yoshinobu Miyazaki	Japan	2:17.90	Q
8	Michel Boulianne	Canada	2:18.03	Q
9	Elvin Chia	Malaysia	2:18.78	Q
10	Ryosuke Imai	Japan	2:18.91	Q
11	Nathan Hewitt	Australia	2:19.03	Q
12	Kurt Grote	United States	2:19.08	Q
13	Steven Ferguson	New Zealand	2:19.35	Q
14	Michael Norment	United States	2:19.44	Q
15	Jason Hunter	Canada	2:19.66	Q
16	Gregory Owen	South Africa	2:20.18	Q
17	Tam Chi Kin	Hong Kong	2:20.55	
18	Matthew Huang	Canada	2:20.78	
19	Morgan Knabe	Canada	2:21.68	
20	Dean Kent	New Zealand	2:23.20	
21	Michael Scott	Hong Kong	2:23.65	
22	Chris Stewart	South Africa	2:23.75	
23	Brett Petersen	South Africa	2:24.74	
24	Matthew Kwok	Hong Kong	2:26.55	

=== Semifinals ===
The semifinals were held on August 25.

Rank	Name	Nationality	Time	Notes
1	Simon Cowley	Australia	2:13.31	Q
2	Regan Harrison	Australia	2:13.78	Q
3	Tom Wilkens	United States	2:14.04	Q
4	Ryan Mitchell	Australia	2:14.67	
5	Kurt Grote	United States	2:15.19	Q
6	Terence Parkin	South Africa	2:15.26	Q
7	Akira Hayashi	Japan	2:15.34	Q
8	Elvin Chia	Malaysia	2:16.90	Q
9	Nathan Hewitt	Australia	2:17.48	
10	Yoshinobu Miyazaki	Japan	2:18.09	Q
10	Michel Boulianne	Canada	2:18.09	
12	Ryosuke Imai	Japan	2:18.27	
13	Jason Hunter	Canada	2:19.29	
14	Gregory Owen	South Africa	2:19.68	
15	Steven Ferguson	New Zealand	2:19.79	
16	Michael Norment	United States	2:20.33	

=== Final ===
The final was held on August 26.

Rank	Lane	Nationality	Time	Notes
1st place, gold medalist(s)	Simon Cowley	Australia	2:12.98	
2nd place, silver medalist(s)	Tom Wilkens	United States	2:13.97	
3rd place, bronze medalist(s)	Terence Parkin	South Africa	2:14.12	
4	Regan Harrison	Australia	2:14.53	
5	Kurt Grote	United States	2:15.41	
6	Akira Hayashi	Japan	2:15.64	
7	Elvin Chia	Malaysia	2:16.41	
8	Yoshinobu Miyazaki	Japan	2:18.41	
