= Swimming at the 1998 Asian Games – Men's 200 metre breaststroke =

Men's 200 metre breaststroke at the 1998 Asian Games
- Venue: Thammasat Aquatic Center
- Date: 10 December 1998
- Competitors: 19 from 13 nations

Medalists
gold medal	Zhu Yi	China
silver medal	Ratapong Sirisanont	Thailand
bronze medal	Yoshinobu Miyazaki	Japan

The men's 200 metre breaststroke swimming competition at the 1998 Asian Games in Bangkok was held on 10 December at the Thammasat Aquatic Center.

== Schedule ==
All times are Indochina Time (UTC+07:00)

Date	Time	Event
Thursday, 10 December 1998	09:00	Heats
Thursday, 10 December 1998	18:00	Final

== Results ==
Legend

- DNS — Did not start

=== Heats ===
Rank	Heat	Athlete	Time	Notes
1	1	Ratapong Sirisanont (THA)	2:18.14	
2	1	Yoshinobu Miyazaki (JPN)	2:18.81	
3	2	Zhu Yi (CHN)	2:20.09	
4	3	Chikara Nakashita (JPN)	2:20.34	
5	2	Li Tsung-chueh (TPE)	2:22.36	
6	3	Zeng Qiliang (CHN)	2:23.32	
7	2	Tam Chi Kin (HKG)	2:23.62	
8	3	Desmond Koh (SIN)	2:23.86	
9	2	Yevgeny Petrashov (KGZ)	2:24.29	
10	3	Yang Shang-hsuan (TPE)	2:24.63	
11	1	Matthew Kwok (HKG)	2:26.77	
12	3	Alexandr Savitskiy (KAZ)	2:29.41	
13	2	Sompoch Jantra (THA)	2:29.59	
14	1	Trần Xuân Hiền (VIE)	2:33.82	
15	1	Conrad Francis (SRI)	2:36.47	
16	3	Wu Ngou Teng (MAC)	2:36.86	
17	1	Niaz Ali (BAN)	2:39.82	
18	2	Mesned Al-Hajri (QAT)	2:48.70	
—	3	Nguyễn Ngọc Anh (VIE)	DNS	

=== Final ===
Rank	Athlete	Time	Notes
1st place, gold medalist(s)	Zhu Yi (CHN)	2:16.26	
2nd place, silver medalist(s)	Ratapong Sirisanont (THA)	2:16.47	
3rd place, bronze medalist(s)	Yoshinobu Miyazaki (JPN)	2:16.97	
4	Chikara Nakashita (JPN)	2:17.10	
5	Li Tsung-chueh (TPE)	2:21.10	
6	Zeng Qiliang (CHN)	2:21.99	
7	Tam Chi Kin (HKG)	2:23.40	
8	Desmond Koh (SIN)	2:24.52	
