= 1999 Pan Pacific Swimming Championships – Men's 100 metre breaststroke =

Men's 100 metre backstroke at the 1999 Pan Pacific Swimming Championships
- Venue: Sydney International Aquatic Centre
- Dates: August 22, 1999 (heats & semifinals); August 23, 1999 (final)
- Competitors: 27 from 10 nations
- Winning time: 1:02.06

Medalists
gold medal	Simon Cowley	Australia
silver medal	Regan Harrison	Australia
bronze medal	Morgan Knabe	Canada

The men's 100 metre breaststroke competition at the 1999 Pan Pacific Swimming Championships took place on August 22–23 at the Sydney International Aquatic Centre. The last champion was Kurt Grote of US.

This race consisted of two lengths of the pool, both lengths being in breaststroke.

== Records ==
Prior to this competition, the existing world and Pan Pacific records were as follows:

World record	Fred Deburghgraeve (BEL)	1:00.60	Atlanta, United States	July 20, 1996
Pan Pacific Championships record	Kurt Grote (USA)	1:01.22	Fukuoka, Japan	August 11, 1997

== Results ==
All times are in minutes and seconds.

KEY:	q	Fastest non-qualifiers	Q	Qualified	CR	Championships record	NR	National record	PB	Personal best	SB	Seasonal best

=== Heats ===
The first round was held on August 22.

Rank	Name	Nationality	Time	Notes
1	Simon Cowley	Australia	1:01.87	Q
2	Morgan Knabe	Canada	1:02.56	Q
3	Michael Norment	United States	1:02.59	Q
4	Steven Ferguson	New Zealand	1:02.91	Q
5	Akira Hayashi	Japan	1:02.99	Q
6	Regan Harrison	Australia	1:03.01	Q
7	Ryosuke Imai	Japan	1:03.12	Q
8	Nathan Hewitt	Australia	1:03.44	Q
9	Elvin Chia	Malaysia	1:03.50	Q
10	Ryan Mitchell	Australia	1:03.53	Q
11	Kurt Grote	United States	1:03.54	Q
12	Gregory Owen	South Africa	1:03.86	Q
13	Chris Stewart	South Africa	1:03.93	Q
14	Brett Petersen	South Africa	1:04.05	Q
15	Terence Parkin	South Africa	1:04.16	Q
16	Michel Boulianne	Canada	1:04.17	Q
17	Yoshinobu Miyazaki	Japan	1:04.40	
18	Jason Hunter	Canada	1:04.43	
19	Justin Norris	Australia	1:04.56	
20	Zeng Qiliang	China	1:04.84	
21	Matthew Huang	Canada	1:05.12	
22	Tam Chi Kin	Hong Kong	1:05.20	
23	Trent Steed	Australia	1:06.02	
24	Matthew Kwok	Hong Kong	1:06.33	
25	Michael Scott	Hong Kong	1:06.39	
26	Dean Kent	New Zealand	1:07.32	
27	Gentle Offoin	Nigeria	1:11.74	

=== Semifinals ===
The semifinals were held on August 22.

Rank	Name	Nationality	Time	Notes
1	Simon Cowley	Australia	1:01.60	Q
2	Akira Hayashi	Japan	1:02.38	Q
3	Michael Norment	United States	1:02.72	Q
4	Kurt Grote	United States	1:02.82	Q
5	Regan Harrison	Australia	1:02.93	Q
6	Ryosuke Imai	Japan	1:02.94	Q
7	Morgan Knabe	Canada	1:03.18	Q
8	Ryan Mitchell	Australia	1:03.31	
9	Brett Petersen	South Africa	1:03.36	Q
10	Terence Parkin	South Africa	1:03.52	
11	Steven Ferguson	New Zealand	1:03.58	
12	Nathan Hewitt	Australia	1:03.92	
13	Chris Stewart	South Africa	1:04.39	
14	Michel Boulianne	Canada	1:04.69	
15	Gregory Owen	South Africa	1:04.91	
16	Elvin Chia	Malaysia	1:05.15	

=== Final ===
The final was held on August 23.

Rank	Lane	Nationality	Time	Notes
1st place, gold medalist(s)	Simon Cowley	Australia	1:02.06	
2nd place, silver medalist(s)	Regan Harrison	Australia	1:02.26	
3rd place, bronze medalist(s)	Morgan Knabe	Canada	1:02.37	
4	Brett Petersen	South Africa	1:02.65	
5	Michael Norment	United States	1:02.70	
6	Kurt Grote	United States	1:02.79	
7	Ryosuke Imai	Japan	1:02.95	
8	Akira Hayashi	Japan	1:03.11	
