= Swimming at the 1998 Asian Games – Men's 100 metre breaststroke =

Men's 100 metre breaststroke at the 1998 Asian Games
- Venue: Thammasat Aquatic Center
- Date: 7 December 1998
- Competitors: 24 from 18 nations

Medalists
gold medal	Zeng Qiliang	China
silver medal	Akira Hayashi	Japan
bronze medal	Elvin Chia	Malaysia

The men's 100 metre breaststroke swimming competition at the 1998 Asian Games in Bangkok was held on 7 December at the Thammasat Aquatic Center.

== Schedule ==
All times are Indochina Time (UTC+07:00)

Date	Time	Event
Monday, 7 December 1998	09:00	Heats
Monday, 7 December 1998	18:00	Finals

== Results ==
=== Heats ===
Rank	Heat	Athlete	Time	Notes
1	3	Zeng Qiliang (CHN)	1:02.38	
2	1	Akira Hayashi (JPN)	1:02.69	
3	2	Zhu Yi (CHN)	1:03.46	
4	2	Elvin Chia (MAS)	1:03.81	
5	3	Yoshinobu Miyazaki (JPN)	1:04.40	
6	2	Li Tsung-chueh (TPE)	1:04.98	
7	3	Kenneth Goh (SIN)	1:05.09	
8	3	Alexandr Savitskiy (KAZ)	1:05.91	
9	3	Yang Shang-hsuan (TPE)	1:06.07	
10	1	Desmond Koh (SIN)	1:06.22	
11	1	Yevgeny Petrashov (KGZ)	1:06.35	
12	3	Non Poonchaisri (THA)	1:06.51	
13	2	Oleg Pukhnatiy (UZB)	1:06.70	
14	2	Matthew Kwok (HKG)	1:06.73	
15	1	Michael Scott (HKG)	1:06.74	
16	1	Nguyễn Ngọc Anh (VIE)	1:08.62	
17	2	Trần Xuân Hiền (VIE)	1:09.79	
18	1	Wu Ngou Teng (MAC)	1:09.85	
19	3	Conrad Francis (SRI)	1:10.91	
20	2	Niaz Ali (BAN)	1:12.44	
21	1	Ayoub Al-Mas (UAE)	1:13.31	
22	1	Khürleegiin Enkhmandakh (MGL)	1:17.63	
23	3	Mesned Al-Hajri (QAT)	1:18.09	
24	2	Alice Shrestha (NEP)	1:19.27	

=== Finals ===
==== Final B ====
Rank	Athlete	Time	Notes
1	Yevgeny Petrashov (KGZ)	1:05.27	
2	Yang Shang-hsuan (TPE)	1:05.61	
3	Matthew Kwok (HKG)	1:05.91	
4	Michael Scott (HKG)	1:06.11	
5	Oleg Pukhnatiy (UZB)	1:06.14	
5	Desmond Koh (SIN)	1:06.14	
7	Non Poonchaisri (THA)	1:06.80	
8	Nguyễn Ngọc Anh (VIE)	1:07.67	

==== Final A ====
Rank	Athlete	Time	Notes
1st place, gold medalist(s)	Zeng Qiliang (CHN)	1:02.32	
2nd place, silver medalist(s)	Akira Hayashi (JPN)	1:02.55	
3rd place, bronze medalist(s)	Elvin Chia (MAS)	1:03.09	
4	Yoshinobu Miyazaki (JPN)	1:03.56	
4	Zhu Yi (CHN)	1:03.56	
6	Kenneth Goh (SIN)	1:04.89	
7	Alexandr Savitskiy (KAZ)	1:05.00	
8	Li Tsung-chueh (TPE)	1:05.40	
