= 2002 Pan Pacific Swimming Championships – Men's 100 metre breaststroke =

Men's 100 metre breaststroke at the 2002 Pan Pacific Swimming Championships
- Venue: Yokohama International Swimming Pool
- Dates: August 24, 2002 (heats & semifinals); August 25, 2002 (final)
- Competitors: 23 from 8 nations
- Winning time: 1:00.36

Medalists
gold medal	Kosuke Kitajima	Japan
silver medal	Brendan Hansen	United States
bronze medal	Jim Piper	Australia

The men's 100 metre breaststroke competition at the 2002 Pan Pacific Swimming Championships took place on August 24–25 at the Yokohama International Swimming Pool. The last champion was Simon Cowley of Australia.

This race consisted of two lengths of the pool, both lengths being in breaststroke.

== Records ==
Prior to this competition, the existing world and Pan Pacific records were as follows:

World record	Roman Sloudnov (RUS)	59.94	Fukuoka, Japan	July 24, 2001
Pan Pacific Championships record	Kurt Grote (USA)	1:01.22	Fukuoka, Japan	August 12, 1997

== Results ==
All times are in minutes and seconds.

KEY:	q	Fastest non-qualifiers	Q	Qualified	CR	Championships record	NR	National record	PB	Personal best	SB	Seasonal best

=== Heats ===
The first round was held on August 24.

Rank	Heat	Lane	Name	Nationality	Time	Notes
1	3	4	Kosuke Kitajima	Japan	1:01.07	Q, CR
2	1	4	Brendan Hansen	United States	1:01.63	Q
3	2	6	David Denniston	United States	1:02.11	Q
4	2	4	Morgan Knabe	Canada	1:02.19	Q
5	3	5	Jim Piper	Australia	1:02.35	Q
6	2	5	Jarrod Marrs	United States	1:02.51	Q
7	3	3	Mark Gangloff	United States	1:02.52	Q
8	2	3	Mike Brown	Canada	1:02.69	Q
9	3	6	Regan Harrison	Australia	1:02.89	Q
10	3	2	Chad Thomsen	Canada	1:02.94	Q
11	1	2	Henrique Barbosa	Brazil	1:03.04	Q
11	1	5	Yoshihisa Yamaguchi	Japan	1:03.04	Q
13	1	3	Justin Norris	Australia	1:03.32	Q
14	1	7	Wang Haibo	China	1:03.80	Q
15	1	6	John Stamhuis	Canada	1:03.88	Q
16	3	7	Daisuke Kimura	Japan	1:03.94	Q
17	2	2	Jiro Miki	Japan	1:03.99	
18	2	7	Marcelo Tomazini	Brazil	1:04.17	
19	3	1	Tam Chi Kin	Hong Kong	1:05.26	
20	2	8	Trent Steed	Australia	1:05.42	
21	3	8	José Belarmino Souza	Brazil	1:05.55	
22	2	1	Kieran Daly	New Zealand	1:05.81	
23	1	8	Michael Andrew Scott	Hong Kong	1:06.43	
-	1	1	Rafael Chua	Philippines	DNS	

=== Semifinals ===
The semifinals were held on August 24.

Rank	Heat	Lane	Name	Nationality	Time	Notes
1	2	4	Kosuke Kitajima	Japan	1:00.34	Q, CR, AS
2	1	4	Brendan Hansen	United States	1:01.52	Q
3	2	3	Jim Piper	Australia	1:01.70	Q
4	2	6	Mark Gangloff	United States	1:01.93	Q
5	2	5	David Denniston	United States	1:01.96	Q
6	1	5	Morgan Knabe	Canada	1:02.21	Q
7	1	6	Mike Brown	Canada	1:02.60	Q
8	2	2	Regan Harrison	Australia	1:02.76	Q
9	1	3	Jarrod Marrs	United States	1:02.88	
10	2	1	Justin Norris	Australia	1:03.00	
11	1	7	Yoshihisa Yamaguchi	Japan	1:03.05	
12	1	2	Chad Thomsen	Canada	1:03.20	
13	2	7	Henrique Barbosa	Brazil	1:03.26	
14	1	8	Daisuke Kimura	Japan	1:03.34	
15	2	8	John Stamhuis	Canada	1:03.69	
16	1	1	Wang Haibo	China	1:03.72	

=== Final ===
The final was held on August 25.

Rank	Lane	Name	Nationality	Time	Notes
1st place, gold medalist(s)	-	Kosuke Kitajima	Japan	1:00.36	
2nd place, silver medalist(s)	-	Brendan Hansen	United States	1:00.84	
3rd place, bronze medalist(s)	-	Jim Piper	Australia	1:01.68	
4	-	Mark Gangloff	United States	1:02.02	
5	-	Mike Brown	Canada	1:02.21	
6	-	Morgan Knabe	Canada	1:02.28	
7	-	Regan Harrison	Australia	1:02.53	
8	-	Yoshihisa Yamaguchi	Japan	1:02.93	
