= Swimming at the 1992 Summer Olympics – Men's 200 metre breaststroke =

Men's 200 metre breaststroke at the Games of the XXV Olympiad
- Venue: Piscines Bernat Picornell
- Date: 29 July 1992 (heats & finals)
- Competitors: 54 from 41 nations
- Winning time: 2:10.16 WR

Medalists
1st place, gold medalist(s)		Mike Barrowman	United States
2nd place, silver medalist(s)		Norbert Rózsa	Hungary
3rd place, bronze medalist(s)		Nick Gillingham	Great Britain

The men's 200 metre breaststroke event at the 1992 Summer Olympics took place on 29 July at the Piscines Bernat Picornell in Barcelona, Spain.

== Records ==
Prior to this competition, the existing world and Olympic records were as follows.

World record	Mike Barrowman (USA)	2:10.60	Fort Lauderdale, United States	13 August 1991
Olympic record	Victor Davis (CAN)	2:13.34	Los Angeles, United States	2 August 1984

The following records were established during the competition:

Date	Round	Name	Nationality	Time	Record
29 July	Heat 7	Mike Barrowman	United States	2:11.40	OR
29 July	Final A	Mike Barrowman	United States	2:10.16	WR

== Results ==
=== Heats ===
Rule: The eight fastest swimmers advance to final A (Q), while the next eight to final B (q).

Rank	Heat	Lane	Name	Nationality	Time	Notes
1	7	4	Mike Barrowman	United States	2:11.48	Q, OR
2	7	5	Norbert Rózsa	Hungary	2:12.95	Q
3	6	4	Nick Gillingham	Great Britain	2:13.42	Q
4	5	4	Károly Güttler	Hungary	2:14.31	Q
5	5	2	Kenji Watanabe	Japan	2:14.35	Q, NR
6	5	3	Phil Rogers	Australia	2:14.39	Q, OC
7	7	6	Akira Hayashi	Japan	2:14.61	Q
8	6	3	Sergio López Miró	Spain	2:14.68	Q
9	6	5	Roque Santos	United States	2:14.71	q
10	5	5	Joaquín Fernández	Spain	2:14.93	q
11	7	7	Stéphane Vossart	France	2:15.11	q
12	5	8	Javier Careaga	Mexico	2:15.59	q, NR
13	5	7	Rodney Lawson	Australia	2:15.67	q
14	7	3	Jonathan Cleveland	Canada	2:15.68	q
15	5	1	Francesco Postiglione	Italy	2:15.97	q
16	6	2	Radek Beinhauer	Czechoslovakia	2:16.26	q
17	7	1	Andrea Cecchi	Italy	2:16.38	
18	6	6	Mario González	Cuba	2:16.45	
19	6	8	Frédérik Deburghgraeve	Belgium	2:16.93	
20	6	7	Gary O'Toole	Ireland	2:17.66	
21	7	2	Christophe Bourdon	France	2:17.68	
22	4	5	Petri Suominen	Finland	2:18.01	
23	5	6	Michael Mason	Canada	2:18.64	
24	4	4	Pablo Minelli	Argentina	2:18.70	
25	4	8	Alexandre Yokochi	Portugal	2:18.97	
26	4	2	Børge Mørk	Norway	2:19.11	
27	3	4	Petteri Lehtinen	Finland	2:20.27	
28	3	5	Patrick Concepcion	Philippines	2:20.33	
29	4	6	Christian Poswiat	Germany	2:20.80	
30	4	7	Gustavo Gorriarán	Uruguay	2:21.25	
31	7	8	Nerijus Beiga	Lithuania	2:21.65	
32	3	7	Desmond Koh	Singapore	2:21.87	
33	3	3	Kenneth Cawood	South Africa	2:21.88	
34	4	3	Ricardo Torres	Panama	2:21.93	
35	6	1	Jason Hender	Great Britain	2:23.10	
36	3	2	Christophe Verdino	Monaco	2:23.33	NR
37	2	6	Andrew Rutherfurd	Hong Kong	2:24.29	
38	4	1	Aleksandr Savitsky	Unified Team	2:24.58	
39	2	7	Chris Flook	Bermuda	2:24.85	
40	2	3	Jörg Lindemeier	Namibia	2:24.88	
41	3	6	Clifford Lyne	South Africa	2:25.66	
42	2	5	Abderzak Bella	Algeria	2:26.35	
43	2	4	Roberto Bonilla	Guatemala	2:28.97	
44	1	6	Chi Jia Han	Hong Kong	2:30.74	
45	1	5	Bernard Desmarais	Mauritius	2:31.52	
46	2	1	Glenn Diaz	Guam	2:34.65	
47	1	4	Danilo Zavoli	San Marino	2:34.87	
48	3	8	Sultan Al-Otaibi	Kuwait	2:35.54	
49	2	2	Ayman Al-Enazy	Kuwait	2:39.12	
50	1	2	Foy Gordon Chung	Fiji	2:41.10	
51	1	7	Obaid Al-Rumaithi	United Arab Emirates	2:44.61	
52	1	3	Mohamed Mukhesur Rahman	Bangladesh	2:51.21	
	1	1	Kenny Roberts	Seychelles	DSQ	
	3	1	Todd Torres	Puerto Rico	DSQ	

=== Finals ===
==== Final B ====
Rank	Lane	Name	Nationality	Time	Notes
9	2	Rodney Lawson	Australia	2:15.50	
10	5	Joaquín Fernández	Spain	2:15.52	
10	3	Stéphane Vossart	France	2:15.52	
12	4	Roque Santos	United States	2:15.73	
13	8	Radek Beinhauer	Czechoslovakia	2:16.07	
14	7	Jonathan Cleveland	Canada	2:16.20	
15	6	Javier Careaga	Mexico	2:16.55	
16	1	Francesco Postiglione	Italy	2:16.92	

==== Final A ====
Rank	Lane	Name	Nationality	Time	Notes
1st place, gold medalist(s)	4	Mike Barrowman	United States	2:10.16	WR
2nd place, silver medalist(s)	5	Norbert Rózsa	Hungary	2:11.23	ER
3rd place, bronze medalist(s)	3	Nick Gillingham	Great Britain	2:11.29	NR
4	8	Sergio López Miró	Spain	2:13.29	
5	6	Károly Güttler	Hungary	2:13.32	
6	7	Phil Rogers	Australia	2:13.59	OC
7	1	Kenji Watanabe	Japan	2:14.70	
8	2	Akira Hayashi	Japan	2:15.11	
