= Swimming at the 1992 Summer Olympics – Men's 100 metre breaststroke =

Men's 100 metre breaststroke at the Games of the XXV Olympiad
- Venue: Piscines Bernat Picornell
- Date: 26 July 1992 (heats & finals)
- Competitors: 61 from 47 nations
- Winning time: 1:01.50 OR

Medalists
1st place, gold medalist(s)		Nelson Diebel	United States
2nd place, silver medalist(s)		Norbert Rózsa	Hungary
3rd place, bronze medalist(s)		Phil Rogers	Australia

The men's 100 metre breaststroke event at the 1992 Summer Olympics took place on 26 July at the Piscines Bernat Picornell in Barcelona, Spain.

== Records ==
Prior to this competition, the existing world and Olympic records were as follows.

World record	Norbert Rózsa (HUN)	1:01.45	Perth, Australia	7 January 1991
Olympic record	Steve Lundquist (USA)	1:01.65	Los Angeles, United States	29 July 1984

The following records were established during the competition:

Date	Round	Name	Nationality	Time	Record
26 July	Final A	Nelson Diebel	United States	1:01.50	OR

== Results ==
=== Heats ===
Rule: The eight fastest swimmers advance to final A (Q), while the next eight to final B (q).

Rank	Heat	Lane	Name	Nationality	Time	Notes
1	8	7	Dmitry Volkov	Unified Team	1:01.74	Q, NR
2	6	5	Akira Hayashi	Japan	1:01.76	Q, NR
3	6	4	Nelson Diebel	United States	1:01.80	Q
4	7	4	Nick Gillingham	Great Britain	1:01.81	Q
5	7	3	Vasily Ivanov	Unified Team	1:01.91	Q
6	7	5	Adrian Moorhouse	Great Britain	1:02.09	Q
7	8	3	Phil Rogers	Australia	1:02.10	Q
8	8	4	Norbert Rózsa	Hungary	1:02.25	Q
9	8	5	Károly Güttler	Hungary	1:02.28	q
10	7	2	Mark Warnecke	Germany	1:02.48	q
11	6	7	Todd Torres	Puerto Rico	1:02.72	q, NR
12	8	6	Jonathan Cleveland	Canada	1:02.73	q
13	7	7	Stéphane Vossart	France	1:02.81	q
14	8	1	Chen Jianhong	China	1:03.08	q
15	6	3	Hans Dersch	United States	1:03.14	q
16	6	6	Gianni Minervini	Italy	1:03.23	q
17	7	6	Andrea Cecchi	Italy	1:03.28	
18	5	6	Kenji Watanabe	Japan	1:03.29	
19	5	3	Marko Pachel	Estonia	1:03.40	
20	5	8	Javier Careaga	Mexico	1:03.45	NR
21	5	4	Ramón Camallonga	Spain	1:03.48	
22	6	8	Mario González	Cuba	1:03.53	
23	8	8	Sergio López Miró	Spain	1:03.69	
24	6	2	Petri Suominen	Finland	1:03.75	
25	6	1	Curtis Myden	Canada	1:03.80	
26	5	5	Christian Poswiat	Germany	1:03.85	
27	5	7	Kenneth Cawood	South Africa	1:04.02	
28	5	2	Shane Lewis	Australia	1:04.17	
29	4	8	Andrew Rutherfurd	Hong Kong	1:04.23	NR
30	5	1	Joseph Eric Buhain	Philippines	1:04.28	
31	7	8	Christophe Bourdon	France	1:04.43	
32	4	5	Radek Beinhauer	Czechoslovakia	1:04.88	
33	3	5	Chris Flook	Bermuda	1:04.93	
34	7	1	Frédérik Deburghgraeve	Belgium	1:05.10	
35	3	4	Patrick Concepcion	Philippines	1:05.16	
36	8	2	Nerijus Beiga	Lithuania	1:05.17	
37	4	3	Børge Mørk	Norway	1:05.47	
38	4	4	Gary O'Toole	Ireland	1:05.48	
39	3	6	Alexandre Yokochi	Portugal	1:05.61	
40	4	2	Gustavo Gorriarán	Uruguay	1:05.79	
41	4	6	Ricardo Torres	Panama	1:06.05	
42	3	7	Charalambos Panagidis	Cyprus	1:06.19	
43	2	4	Jörg Lindemeier	Namibia	1:06.34	
44	4	1	Lars Sørensen	Denmark	1:07.94	
45	3	3	Chi Jia Han	Hong Kong	1:06.81	
46	3	2	Bernard Desmarais	Mauritius	1:07.75	
47	3	1	Abderzak Bella	Algeria	1:07.88	
48	2	3	Christophe Verdino	Monaco	1:07.90	
49	2	6	Roberto Bonilla	Guatemala	1:08.27	
50	1	4	Danilo Zavoli	San Marino	1:09.65	
51	2	7	Glenn Diaz	Guam	1:10.32	
52	1	6	Obaid Al-Rumaithi	United Arab Emirates	1:12.77	
53	2	2	Ayman Al-Enazy	Kuwait	1:13.49	
54	1	3	Foy Gordon Chung	Fiji	1:13.51	
55	2	1	Sergio Fafitine	Mozambique	1:13.76	
56	2	5	Frank Leskaj	Albania	1:14.28	
57	1	2	Mohamed Bin Abid	United Arab Emirates	1:15.12	
58	1	7	Kenny Roberts	Seychelles	1:16.52	
	4	7	Pablo Minelli	Argentina	DSQ	
	1	5	Mohamed Mukhesur Rahman	Bangladesh	DNS	
	1	1	Mouhamed Diop	Senegal	DNS	

=== Finals ===
==== Final B ====
Rank	Lane	Name	Nationality	Time	Notes
9	4	Károly Güttler	Hungary	1:01.84	
10	1	Hans Dersch	United States	1:02.39	
10	2	Stéphane Vossart	France	1:02.39	
10	8	Gianni Minervini	Italy	1:02.39	
13	5	Mark Warnecke	Germany	1:02.73	
13	6	Jonathan Cleveland	Canada	1:02.73	
15	7	Chen Jianhong	China	1:03.00	
16	3	Todd Torres	Puerto Rico	1:03.21	

==== Final A ====
Rank	Lane	Name	Nationality	Time	Notes
1st place, gold medalist(s)	3	Nelson Diebel	United States	1:01.50	OR
2nd place, silver medalist(s)	8	Norbert Rózsa	Hungary	1:01.68	
3rd place, bronze medalist(s)	1	Phil Rogers	Australia	1:01.76	OC
4	5	Akira Hayashi	Japan	1:01.86	
5	2	Vasily Ivanov	Unified Team	1:01.87	
6	4	Dmitry Volkov	Unified Team	1:02.07	
7	6	Nick Gillingham	Great Britain	1:02.32	
8	7	Adrian Moorhouse	Great Britain	1:02.33	
