= Swimming at the 2000 Summer Olympics – Men's 200 metre breaststroke =

Men's 200 metre breaststroke at the Games of the XXVII Olympiad
- Venue: Sydney International Aquatic Centre
- Date: September 19, 2000 (heats & semifinals); September 20, 2000 (final)
- Competitors: 49 from 44 nations
- Winning time: 2:10.87 EU

Medalists
1st place, gold medalist(s)		Domenico Fioravanti	Italy
2nd place, silver medalist(s)		Terence Parkin	South Africa
3rd place, bronze medalist(s)		Davide Rummolo	Italy

The men's 200 metre breaststroke event at the 2000 Summer Olympics took place on 19–20 September at the Sydney International Aquatic Centre in Sydney, Australia.

Domenico Fioravanti emerged as a major force on the international swimming after effortlessly winning his second gold at these Games. He maintained a lead from start to finish and posted a European record of 2:10.87, the second-fastest of all time, making him the first ever swimmer in Olympic history to strike a breaststroke double. South Africa's Terence Parkin, a deaf mute since birth, enjoyed the race of his life to take a silver medal in an African record of 2:12.50. Fioravanti's fellowman Davide Rummolo gave Italy a further reason to celebrate, as he powered home with the bronze in 2:12.73.

Acknowledging a massive cheer from the home crowd, Australia's Regan Harrison swam his lifetime best, but finished outside the podium by 15-hundredths of a second in 2:12.88. Czech Republic's Daniel Málek pulled off a fifth-place finish in a national record of 2:13.20, while Kyle Salyards, the only U.S. swimmer in the final, earned a sixth spot with a time of 2:13.27. France's Yohann Bernard (2:13.31) and another Aussie Ryan Mitchell (2:14.00) rounded out the finale. Notable swimmers failed to reach the top 8 final, featuring Hungary's Norbert Rózsa, the defending Olympic champion, who placed thirteenth (2:14.67), and Canada's Morgan Knabe, who had the fastest 100-metre split, but faded badly on the final lap to place tenth (2:14.01).

Shortly before the next Olympics, Fioravanti was forced to retire from swimming after failing a routine medical test carried by the Italian National Olympic Committee. Tests revealed that he was diagnosed with a genetic heart anomaly.

== Records ==
Prior to this competition, the existing world and Olympic records were as follows.

World record	Mike Barrowman (USA)	2:10.16	Barcelona, Spain	29 July 1992
Olympic record	Mike Barrowman (USA)	2:10.16	Barcelona, Spain	29 July 1992

== Results ==
=== Heats ===
Rank	Heat	Lane	Name	Nationality	Time	Notes
1	6	7	Davide Rummolo	Italy	2:12.75	Q, NR
2	4	5	Daniel Málek	Czech Republic	2:14.10	Q, NR
3	7	2	Morgan Knabe	Canada	2:14.18	Q
4	7	7	Maxim Podoprigora	Austria	2:14.37	Q, NR
5	5	6	Ryan Mitchell	Australia	2:14.69	Q
6	7	4	Stéphan Perrot	France	2:14.79	Q
7	7	6	Regan Harrison	Australia	2:14.85	Q
8	5	7	Martin Gustavsson	Sweden	2:15.02	Q
9	6	2	Domenico Fioravanti	Italy	2:15.04	Q
10	6	3	Terence Parkin	South Africa	2:15.06	Q
11	6	1	Norbert Rózsa	Hungary	2:15.27	Q
12	6	4	Yohann Bernard	France	2:15.35	Q
13	5	3	Akira Hayashi	Japan	2:15.54	Q
14	6	5	Kyle Salyards	United States	2:15.57	Q
15	2	2	Alexander Tkachev	Kyrgyzstan	2:15.63	Q
16	7	5	Dmitry Komornikov	Russia	2:15.70	Q
17	7	3	Kosuke Kitajima	Japan	2:15.71	
18	4	3	Marek Krawczyk	Poland	2:16.08	
19	4	4	Valērijs Kalmikovs	Latvia	2:16.21	NR
20	5	4	Roman Sloudnov	Russia	2:16.26	
21	5	5	Tom Wilkens	United States	2:16.30	
22	5	8	Aliaksandr Hukau	Belarus	2:16.93	
23	5	1	Benno Kuipers	Netherlands	2:17.03	
24	6	6	Adam Whitehead	Great Britain	2:17.16	
25	4	8	Jakob Jóhann Sveinsson	Iceland	2:17.86	NR
26	7	8	José Couto	Portugal	2:18.08	
27	4	1	Andrew Bree	Ireland	2:18.14	
28	2	6	Oleg Lisogor	Ukraine	2:18.28	
29	3	2	Joe Kyong-fan	South Korea	2:19.16	NR
30	3	5	Li Tsung-chueh	Chinese Taipei	2:19.30	
31	4	7	Steven Ferguson	New Zealand	2:19.31	
32	4	6	Tal Stricker	Israel	2:19.33	
33	3	4	Raiko Pachel	Estonia	2:19.71	
34	2	3	Jarno Pihlava	Finland	2:19.76	
35	3	8	Francisco Suriano	El Salvador	2:20.10	
36	2	5	Jeremy Knowles	Bahamas	2:20.31	
37	1	4	Andrés Bicocca	Argentina	2:20.98	
38	5	2	Zhu Yi	China	2:21.60	
39	3	6	Alvaro Fortuny	Guatemala	2:21.78	
40	3	1	Muhammad Akbar Nasution	Indonesia	2:23.81	
41	4	2	Ratapong Sirisanont	Thailand	2:23.95	
42	3	7	Tam Chi Kin	Hong Kong	2:24.04	
43	3	3	Juan José Madrigal	Costa Rica	2:24.49	
44	7	1	Elvin Chia	Malaysia	2:26.84	
45	1	3	Nguyễn Ngọc Anh	Vietnam	2:29.54	
46	2	7	Sergey Voytsekhovich	Uzbekistan	2:30.23	
47	1	5	Leonard Ngoma	Zambia	2:32.90	
	2	4	Vadim Tatarov	Moldova	DNS	
	6	8	Jens Kruppa	Germany	DNS	

=== Semifinals ===
==== Semifinal 1 ====
Rank	Lane	Name	Nationality	Time	Notes
1	1	Kyle Salyards	United States	2:13.38	Q
2	4	Daniel Málek	Czech Republic	2:13.46	Q, NR
3	7	Yohann Bernard	France	2:13.48	Q
4	2	Terence Parkin	South Africa	2:13.57	Q
5	8	Dmitry Komornikov	Russia	2:13.95	
6	5	Maxim Podoprigora	Austria	2:14.20	
7	3	Stéphan Perrot	France	2:14.59	
8	6	Martin Gustavsson	Sweden	2:15.23	

==== Semifinal 2 ====
Rank	Lane	Name	Nationality	Time	Notes
1	2	Domenico Fioravanti	Italy	2:12.37	Q, NR
2	4	Davide Rummolo	Italy	2:13.23	Q
3	6	Regan Harrison	Australia	2:13.75	Q
4	3	Ryan Mitchell	Australia	2:13.87	Q
5	5	Morgan Knabe	Canada	2:14.01	
6	7	Norbert Rózsa	Hungary	2:14.67	
7	1	Akira Hayashi	Japan	2:15.16	
8	8	Alexander Tkachev	Kyrgyzstan	2:16.90	

=== Final ===
Rank	Lane	Name	Nationality	Time	Notes
1st place, gold medalist(s)	4	Domenico Fioravanti	Italy	2:10.87	EU
2nd place, silver medalist(s)	7	Terence Parkin	South Africa	2:12.50	AF
3rd place, bronze medalist(s)	5	Davide Rummolo	Italy	2:12.73	
4	1	Regan Harrison	Australia	2:12.88	OC
5	6	Daniel Málek	Czech Republic	2:13.20	NR
6	3	Kyle Salyards	United States	2:13.27	
7	2	Yohann Bernard	France	2:13.31	
8	8	Ryan Mitchell	Australia	2:14.00	
