= 1997 Pan Pacific Swimming Championships – Men's 200 metre breaststroke =

Athletic competition event

Men's 200 metre breaststroke at the 1997 Pan Pacific Swimming Championships
- Venue: NISHI Civic Pool
- Dates: August 13, 1997 (heats & finals)
- Competitors: 16 from 6 nations
- Winning time: 2:14.05

Medalists
gold medal	Kurt Grote	United States
silver medal	Yoshiaki Okita	Japan
bronze medal	Tom Wilkens	United States

The men's 200 metre breaststroke competition at the 1997 Pan Pacific Swimming Championships took place on August 13 at the NISHI Civic Pool. The last champion was Akira Hayashi of Japan.

This race consisted of four lengths of the pool, all in breaststroke.

== Records ==
Prior to this competition, the existing world and Pan Pacific records were as follows:

World record	Mike Barrowman (USA)	2:10.16	Barcelona, Spain	July 29, 1992
Pan Pacific Championships record	Mike Barrowman (USA)	2:11.96	Edmonton, Canada	August 25, 1991

== Results ==
All times are in minutes and seconds.

KEY:	q	Fastest non-qualifiers	Q	Qualified	CR	Championships record	NR	National record	PB	Personal best	SB	Seasonal best

=== Heats ===
The first round was held on August 13.

Rank	Name	Nationality	Time	Notes
1	Tom Wilkens	United States	2:15.67	QA
2	Kurt Grote	United States	2:16.06	QA
3	Chikara Nakashita	Japan	2:16.36	QA
3	Yoshiaki Okita	Japan	2:16.36	QA
5	Simon Cowley	Australia	2:16.63	QA
6	Phil Rogers	Australia	2:17.10	QA
6	Morgan Knabe	Canada	2:17.10	QA
8	Michael Norment	United States	2:17.94	QA
9	Andrew Chan	Canada	2:17.99	QB
10	Jarrod Marrs	United States	2:18.25	QB
11	Jeremy Linn	United States	2:19.29	QB
12	Yoshinobu Miyazaki	Japan	2:20.76	QB
13	Tam Chi Kin	Hong Kong	2:20.88	QB
14	Michael Scott	Hong Kong	2:27.77	QB
15	Robert van der Zant	Australia	2:30.24	QB
16	Denny Kurniawan	Indonesia	2:32.74	QB

=== B Final ===
The B final was held on August 13.

Rank	Name	Nationality	Time	Notes
9	Yoshinobu Miyazaki	Japan	2:18.48	
10	Michael Norment	United States	2:18.70	
11	Tam Chi Kin	Hong Kong	2:23.08	
12	Michael Scott	Hong Kong	2:25.30	
13	Robert van der Zant	Australia	2:26.78	
14	Denny Kurniawan	Indonesia	2:31.27	
–	Jarrod Marrs	United States	DNS	
–	Jeremy Linn	United States	DNS	

=== A Final ===
The A final was held on August 13.

Rank	Lane	Nationality	Time	Notes
1st place, gold medalist(s)	Kurt Grote	United States	2:14.05	
2nd place, silver medalist(s)	Yoshiaki Okita	Japan	2:14.59	
3rd place, bronze medalist(s)	Tom Wilkens	United States	2:14.80	
4	Phil Rogers	Australia	2:14.81	
5	Chikara Nakashita	Japan	2:14.97	
6	Simon Cowley	Australia	2:15.36	
7	Morgan Knabe	Canada	2:16.73	
8	Andrew Chan	Canada	2:17.59	
