= Hong Kong at the 1992 Summer Olympics =

- IOC code: HKG
- NOC: Sports Federation and Olympic Committee of Hong Kong

in Barcelona
- Competitors: 38 (28 men, 10 women) in 11 sports
- Flag bearer: None
- Officials: ?
- Medals: Gold 0 Silver 0 Bronze 0 Total 0

Summer Olympics appearances (overview)
- 1952; 1956; 1960; 1964; 1968; 1972; 1976; 1980; 1984; 1988; 1992; 1996; 2000; 2004; 2008; 2012; 2016; 2020; 2024; 2028

Hong Kong competed at the 1992 Summer Olympics in Barcelona, Spain. 38 competitors, 28 men and 10 women, took part in 39 events in 11 sports.

== Competitors ==
The following is the list of number of competitors in the Games.

Sport	Men	Women	Total
Archery	1	0	1
Athletics	2	1	3
Badminton	4	1	5
Canoeing	2	0	2
Fencing	3	0	3
Judo	2	2	4
Rowing	2	1	3
Sailing	3	1	4
Shooting	1	0	1
Swimming	7	1	8
Table tennis	1	3	4
Total	28	10	38

== Archery ==
In its third Olympic archery competition, Hong Kong was represented by only one archer. He did not advance to the elimination rounds.

Men's Individual Competition:

- Fung Yick

- Ranking Round — 69th place (0-0)

== Athletics ==
Men's 100m metres

- Wai-Ming Ku

- Heat — 10.74 (→ did not advance)

Men's 200m metres

- Pat Kwok Wai

- Heat — 22.45 (→ did not advance)

== Fencing ==
Three male fencers represented Hong Kong in 1992.

Men's foil

- Lo Moon Tong
- Wu Xing Yao
- Tang Kwong Hau

== Judo ==
Men's Judo-60 kg Lee Kan

== Sailing ==
Men's Sailboard (Lechner A-390)

- Wong Tak Sum

- Final Ranking — 227.7 points (→ 20th place)

Women's Sailboard (Lechner A-390)

- Lee Lai Shan

- Final Ranking — 143.0 points (→ 11th place)

1992: Flying Dutchman

- Simon Ellis & Sven Merkel

- Final Ranking — 133.0 points (→ 17th place)

== Swimming ==
Men's 50m Freestyle

- Michael Wright
  1. Heat – 23.90 (→ did not advance, 39th place)
- Tat Cheung Wu
  1. Heat – 25.45 (→ did not advance, 59th place)

Men's 100m Freestyle

- Michael Wright
  1. Heat – 51.88 (→ did not advance, 39th place)
- Arthur Kai Yien Li
  1. Heat – 52.22 (→ did not advance, 42nd place)

Men's 200m Freestyle

- Arthur Kai Yien Li
  1. Heat – 1:54.35 (→ did not advance, 33rd place)
- Kar Wai Kelvin Li
  1. Heat – 1:59.40 (→ did not advance, 41st place)

Men's 100m Breaststroke

- Andrew Rutherford
  1. Heat – 1:04.23 (→ did not advance, 29th place)
- Jia Han Chi
  1. Heat – 1:06.81 (→ did not advance, 44th place)

Men's 200m Breaststroke

- Andrew Rutherford
  1. Heat – 2:24.29 (→ did not advance, 37th place)
- Jia Han Chi
  1. Heat – 2:30.74 (→ did not advance, 44th place)

Men's 100m Butterfly

- Arthur Kai Yien Li
  1. Heat – 56.47 (→ did not advance, 39th place)
- Duncan Todd
  1. Heat – 57.29 (→ did not advance, 48th place)

Men's 200m Butterfly

- Duncan Todd
  1. Heat – 2:08.20 (→ did not advance, 38th place)

Men's 200m Individual Medley

- Arthur Kai Yien Li
  1. Heat – 2:09.32 (→ did not advance, 37th place)
- Duncan Todd
  1. Heat – 2:12.29 (→ did not advance, 42nd place)

Men's 400m Individual Medley

- Duncan Todd
  1. Heat – 4:41.84 (→ did not advance, 30th place)

Men's 4 × 100 m Freestyle Relay

- Arthur Kai Yien Li, Tat Cheung Wu, Kar Wai Kelvin Li, and Michael Wright
  1. Heat – 3:30.61 (→ did not advance, 14th place)

Men's 4 × 200 m Freestyle Relay

- Arthur Kai Yien Li, Michael Wright, Kar Wai Kelvin Li, and Tat Cheung Wu
  1. Heat – 7:54.30 (→ did not advance, 16th place)

Men's 4 × 100 m Medley Relay

- Arthur Kai Yien Li, Andrew Rutherford, Duncan Todd, and Michael Wright
  1. Heat – 3:56.46 (→ did not advance, 19th place)

Women's 50m Freestyle

- Robyn Lamsam
  1. Heat – 27.40 (→ did not advance, 36th place)

Women's 100m Freestyle

- Robyn Lamsam
  1. Heat – 59.26 (→ did not advance, 37th place)

Women's 200m Freestyle

- Robyn Lamsam
  1. Heat – 2:08.60 (→ did not advance, 30th place)

Women's 400m Freestyle

- Robyn Lamsam
  1. Heat – 4:32.23 (→ did not advance, 30th place)
