= 1997 Pan Pacific Swimming Championships – Men's 100 metre breaststroke =

Men's 100 metre breaststroke at the 1997 Pan Pacific Swimming Championships
- Venue: NISHI Civic Pool
- Dates: August 11, 1997 (heats & finals)
- Competitors: 17 from 9 nations
- Winning time: 1:01.22

Medalists
gold medal	Kurt Grote	United States
silver medal	Phil Rogers	Australia
bronze medal	Jarrod Marrs	United States

The men's 100 metre breaststroke competition at the 1997 Pan Pacific Swimming Championships took place on August 11 at the NISHI Civic Pool. The last champion was Eric Wunderlich of US.

This race consisted of two lengths of the pool, both lengths being in breaststroke.

== Records ==
Prior to this competition, the existing world and Pan Pacific records were as follows:

World record	Fred Deburghgraeve (BEL)	1:00.60	Atlanta, United States	July 20, 1996
Pan Pacific Championships record	Phil Rogers (AUS)	1:01.56	Kobe, Japan	August 13, 1993

== Results ==
All times are in minutes and seconds.

KEY:	q	Fastest non-qualifiers	Q	Qualified	CR	Championships record	NR	National record	PB	Personal best	SB	Seasonal best

=== Heats ===
The first round was held on August 11.

Rank	Name	Nationality	Time	Notes
1	Kurt Grote	United States	1:01.31	QA, CR
2	Jarrod Marrs	United States	1:02.09	QA
3	Phil Rogers	Australia	1:02.18	QA
4	Jeremy Linn	United States	1:02.27	QA
5	Simon Cowley	Australia	1:02.77	QA
6	Morgan Knabe	Canada	1:02.81	QA
7	Yoshiaki Okita	Japan	1:03.23	QA
8	Kwang-Jea Cho	South Korea	1:03.35	QA
9	Michael Norment	United States	1:03.44	QB
10	Yoshinobu Miyazaki	Japan	1:03.49	QB
11	Chikara Nakashita	Japan	1:03.70	QB
12	Andrew Chan	Canada	1:03.95	QB
13	Tam Chi Kin	Hong Kong	1:05.59	QB
14	Michael Scott	Hong Kong	1:06.98	QB
15	Oleg Pukhnatiy	Uzbekistan	1:07.35	QB
16	Denny Kurniawan	Indonesia	1:09.29	QB
17	Man Pan Chan	Macau	1:18.80	

=== B Final ===
The B final was held on August 11.

Rank	Name	Nationality	Time	Notes
9	Jeremy Linn	United States	1:01.88	
10	Chikara Nakashita	Japan	1:03.70	
11	Andrew Chan	Canada	1:03.77	
12	Tam Chi Kin	Hong Kong	1:06.05	
13	Michael Scott	Hong Kong	1:06.31	
14	Oleg Pukhnatiy	Uzbekistan	1:07.00	
15	Denny Kurniawan	Indonesia	1:09.82	
–	Man Pan Chan	Macau	DNS	

=== A Final ===
The A final was held on August 11.

Rank	Lane	Nationality	Time	Notes
1st place, gold medalist(s)	Kurt Grote	United States	1:01.22	CR
2nd place, silver medalist(s)	Phil Rogers	Australia	1:01.85	
3rd place, bronze medalist(s)	Jarrod Marrs	United States	1:02.64	
4	Yoshinobu Miyazaki	Japan	1:02.72	
5	Simon Cowley	Australia	1:02.74	
6	Kwang-Jea Cho	South Korea	1:02.94	
7	Morgan Knabe	Canada	1:02.99	
8	Yoshiaki Okita	Japan	1:03.31	
