= Leonard Ngoma =

Zambian swimmer (born 1979)

Personal information
- Full name: Leonard Ngoma
- Nationality: Zambia
- Born: 2 January 1979 (age 47) Mufulira, Zambia
- Height: 1.76 m (5 ft 9 in)
- Weight: 70 kg (154 lb)

Sport
- Sport: Swimming
- Strokes: Breaststroke
- Club: Bolles School Swim Club (U.S.)
- College team: Wright State University (U.S.)
- Coach: Sion Brinn (JAM)

Leonard Ngoma (born January 2, 1979) is a Zambian former swimmer, who specialized in breaststroke events. He attended Bolles School in Jacksonville, Florida, and later represented his homeland Zambia at the 2000 Summer Olympics. While studying in the United States, Ngoma played for the Wright State Raiders swimming and diving team at Wright State University in Fairborn, Ohio, and trained with his partner and newly hired assistant coach Sion Brinn, a two-time Olympian (1996 and 2000) who held a dual citizenship to compete for Jamaica and Great Britain.

Ngoma qualified for the men's 200 m breaststroke at the 2000 Summer Olympics in Sydney, by receiving a Universality place from FINA, in an entry time of 2:23.00. He participated in heat one against two other swimmers Andrés Bicocca of Argentina and Nguyen Ngoc Anh of Vietnam. He closed out a small field to last place by almost 12 seconds behind winner Bicocca with a slowest time of 2:32.90. Ngoma failed to advance into the semifinals, as he placed forty-seventh overall in the prelims.
