= Swimming at the 2002 Asian Games – Men's 100 metre breaststroke =

Men's 100 metre breaststroke at the 2002 Asian Games
- Venue: Sajik Swimming Pool
- Date: 30 September 2002
- Competitors: 24 from 18 nations

Medalists
gold medal	Kosuke Kitajima	Japan
silver medal	Zeng Qiliang	China
bronze medal	Yoshihisa Yamaguchi	Japan

The men's 100 metre breaststroke swimming competition at the 2002 Asian Games in Busan was held on 30 September at the Sajik Swimming Pool.

== Schedule ==
All times are Korea Standard Time (UTC+09:00)

Date	Time	Event
Monday, 30 September 2002	10:00	Heats
Monday, 30 September 2002	19:00	Finals

== Records ==
Prior to this competition, the existing world, Asian and Games records were as follows.

World Record	Roman Sludnov (RUS)	59.94	Fukuoka, Japan	23 July 2001
Asian Record	Kosuke Kitajima (JPN)	1:00.34	Yokohama, Japan	24 August 2002
Games Record	Akira Hayashi (JPN)	1:02.04	Hiroshima, Japan	3 October 1994

== Results ==
Legend

- DSQ — Disqualified

=== Heats ===
Rank	Heat	Athlete	Time	Notes
1	3	Kosuke Kitajima (JPN)	1:00.71	GR
2	2	Yoshihisa Yamaguchi (JPN)	1:03.84	
3	1	Zeng Qiliang (CHN)	1:03.87	
4	3	Chen Cho-yi (TPE)	1:04.08	
5	1	Cheng Hao (CHN)	1:04.20	
6	3	Elvin Chia (MAS)	1:04.51	
7	2	Yang Shang-hsuan (TPE)	1:04.90	
8	2	Tam Chi Kin (HKG)	1:05.04	
9	3	Ahmed Al-Kudmani (KSA)	1:05.11	
10	2	Raphael Matthew Chua (PHI)	1:05.25	
11	3	Yevgeniy Ryzhkov (KAZ)	1:06.31	
11	1	Son Sung-uk (KOR)	1:06.31	
13	2	Ryu Seung-hyun (KOR)	1:06.44	
14	1	Trần Xuân Hiền (VIE)	1:08.05	
15	2	Wael Ghassan (QAT)	1:09.90	
16	1	Ma Chan Wai (MAC)	1:10.08	
17	3	Niaz Ali (BAN)	1:11.27	
18	1	Omar Daaboul (LIB)	1:14.48	
19	3	Alice Shrestha (NEP)	1:14.54	
20	1	Alaa Feshtok (QAT)	1:15.50	
21	2	Ganboldyn Urnultsaikhan (MGL)	1:16.14	
22	3	Wasseim Surey (PLE)	1:16.40	
23	2	Khürleegiin Enkhmandakh (MGL)	1:16.69	
24	1	Imran Abdul Rahman (MDV)	1:31.64	

=== Final B ===
Rank	Athlete	Time	Notes
1	Raphael Matthew Chua (PHI)	1:06.11	
2	Yevgeniy Ryzhkov (KAZ)	1:06.24	
3	Son Sung-uk (KOR)	1:06.33	
4	Ahmed Al-Kudmani (KSA)	1:06.41	
5	Ryu Seung-hyun (KOR)	1:06.54	
6	Trần Xuân Hiền (VIE)	1:07.16	
7	Ma Chan Wai (MAC)	1:08.79	
8	Wael Ghassan (QAT)	1:10.30	

=== Final A ===
Rank	Athlete	Time	Notes
1st place, gold medalist(s)	Kosuke Kitajima (JPN)	1:00.45	GR
2nd place, silver medalist(s)	Zeng Qiliang (CHN)	1:03.04	
3rd place, bronze medalist(s)	Yoshihisa Yamaguchi (JPN)	1:03.22	
4	Yang Shang-hsuan (TPE)	1:04.09	
5	Elvin Chia (MAS)	1:04.22	
6	Cheng Hao (CHN)	1:04.52	
7	Tam Chi Kin (HKG)	1:05.55	
—	Chen Cho-yi (TPE)	DSQ	
