= Swimming at the 2001 Goodwill Games =

The swimming competition at the 2001 Goodwill Games was held in Brisbane, Australia at the Sleeman Centre (Brisbane) from 6 to 9 September.

== Men's events ==
Event	Gold		Silver		Bronze	
50 m freestyle	Bartosz Kizierowski; Poland	22.36	Gary Hall Jr. United States	22.44	Brett Hawke; Australia	22.48
100 m freestyle	Michael Klim; Australia	48.81	Ashley Callus; Australia	49.34	Scott Tucker; United States	49.38
200 m freestyle	Grant Hackett; Australia	1:47.95	Ian Thorpe; Australia	1:48.34	Chad Carvin; United States	1:50.04
400 m freestyle	Ian Thorpe; Australia	3:45.40 (GR)	Grant Hackett; Australia	3:47.34	Craig Stevens; Australia	3:50.92
1500 m freestyle	Grant Hackett; Australia	15:01.25 (GR)	Aleksei Filipets; Russia	15:07.17	Craig Stevens; Australia	15:22.90
50 m backstroke	Bartosz Kizierowski; Poland	25.63 (GR)	Matt Welsh; Australia	25.67	Dan Westcott; United States	25.95
100 m backstroke	Matt Welsh; Australia	54.81	Dan Westcott; United States	55.35	Vladislav Aminov; Russia	55.73
200 m backstroke	Ray Hass; Australia	1:59.95	Matt Welsh; Australia	2:00.39	Mark Versfeld; Canada	2:02.09
50 m butterfly	Geoff Huegill; Australia	23.63 (GR)	Michael Klim; Australia	23.78	Adam Pine; Australia	24.21
100 m butterfly	Michael Klim; Australia	52.51 (GR)	Geoff Huegill; Australia	52.54	Mike Mintenko; Canada	52.75
200 m butterfly	Tom Malchow; United States	1:55.27 (GR)	Eric Donnelly; United States	1:59.07	Andrew Livingston; Puerto Rico	1:59.52
50 m breaststroke	Jarrod Marrs; United States	28.50 (GR)	Brett Petersen; South Africa	28.72	Simon Cowley; Australia	28.74
100 m breaststroke	Kosuke Kitajima; Japan	1:01.76 =(GR)	Simon Cowley; Australia	1:02.16	Jarrod Marrs; United States	1:02.35
200 m breaststroke	Terence Parkin; South Africa	2:13.21	Jim Piper; Australia	2:13.36	Regan Harrison; Australia	2:13.50
200 m individual medley	Tom Wilkens; United States	2:02.05	Robert van der Zant; Australia	2:02.41	Dean Kent; New Zealand	2:02.75
400 m individual medley	Tom Wilkens; United States	4:17.93	Dean Kent; New Zealand	4:20.50	Eric Donnelly; United States	4:20.86
4 × 100 m freestyle relay	Australia; Ian Thorpe (49.61); Ashley Callus (48.30); Todd Pearson (49.58); Michael Klim (48.38)	3:16.32 (GR)	All-Stars (Argentina) José Meolans (South Africa) Nicholas Folker (South Africa) Roland Schoeman (Brazil) Fernando Scherer	3:18.78	United States; Jason Lezak; Scott Tucker; Gregory Busse; Carl Anderson	3:19.97
4 × 100 m medley relay	Australia; Matt Welsh; Regan Harrison; Geoff Huegill; Ian Thorpe	3:38.26 (GR)	All-Stars (Canada) Mark Versfeld (Canada) Morgan Knabe (Canada) Mike Mintenko (Argentina) José Meolans	3:39.54	Euro All-Stars (Netherlands) Klaas-Erik Zwering (Russia) Dmitri Komornikov (Sweden) Lars Frölander (Netherlands) Pieter van den Hoogenband	3:39.66
