= Swimming at the 1998 World Aquatics Championships – Men's 4 × 100 metre medley relay =

Men's 4×100 metre medley relay at the 1998 FINA World Championships
- Date: 18 January 1998
- Winning time: 3 minutes 37.98 seconds

Medalists
gold medal	Matt Welsh; Phil Rogers; Michael Klim; Chris Fydler	Australia
silver medal	Lenny Krayzelburg; Kurt Grote; Neil Walker; Gary Hall, Jr.	United States
bronze medal	Attila Czene; Norbert Rózsa; Péter Horváth; Attila Zubor	Hungary

The final and the qualifying heats of the men's 4×100 metre medley relay event at the 1998 World Aquatics Championships were held on Sunday 18 January 1998 in Perth, Western Australia.

== Results ==
=== Heats ===
Rank	Heat	Nation	Swimmers	Time	Notes
1	2	Australia	Matt Welsh; Phil Rogers; Geoff Huegill; Chris Fydler	3:40.08	
2	2	Germany	Stev Theloke; Mark Warnecke; Thomas Rupprath; Torsten Spanneberg	3:41.53	
3	2	Hungary	Attila Czene; Norbert Rózsa; Péter Horváth; Attila Zubor	3:41.61	
4	2	United States	Neil Walker; Jeremy Linn; John Hargis; Scott Tucker	3:41.81	
5	1	Poland	Mariusz Siembida; Marek Krawczyk; Marcin Kaczmarek; Bart Kizierowski	3:42.83	
6	2	Japan	Keitaro Konnai; Yoshinobu Miyazaki; Takashi Yamamoto; Shunsuke Ito	3:42.99	
7	2	Great Britain	Neil Willey; Richard Maden; James Hickman; Gavin Meadows	3:43.17	
8	1	Russia	Vladislav Aminov; Alexandre Tkatchev; Denis Pimankov; Roman Egorov	3:43.27	
9	1	Italy	Emanuele Merisi; Domenico Fioravanti; André Gusperti; Lorenzo Vismara	3:44.20	
10	1	Canada	Mark Versfeld; Morgan Knabe; Stephen Clarke; Craig Hutchison	3:45.38	
11	1	Cuba	Rodolfo Falcón; Gunter Rodríguez; Johan Garcia; Marcos Hernández	3:48.05	
12	2	New Zealand	Ross Dunwoody; Steven Ferguson; Split Winter; Trent Bray	3:50.03	
13	1	Uzbekistan	Alexey Makhantsev; Oleg Pukhnaty; Sergey Erilin; Ravil Nachaev	3:59.15	
14	1	Chinese Taipei	Tseng Cheng Hua; Li Tseng Chueh; Hung Chien Chih; Huang Chih Yung	4:00.60	
15	2	Hong Kong	Alex Fong; Tam Chi Kin; Mark Kwok; Zachary Moffatt	4:02.06	
16	1	Iran	Omid Teimouri; Khashaya Hazrati Ashtiani; Pirouz Eftekhar Manavi; Amir Saleh Azadi Namin	4:22.73	

=== Final ===
Rank	Nation	Swimmers	Time	Notes
1st place, gold medalist(s)	Australia	Matt Welsh (55.56); Phil Rogers (1:01.38); Michael Klim (51.80); Chris Fydler (49.24)	3:37.98	OC
2nd place, silver medalist(s)	United States	Lenny Krayzelburg (55.30); Kurt Grote (1:00.96); Neil Walker (53.41); Gary Hall, Jr. (48.89)	3:38.56	
3rd place, bronze medalist(s)	Hungary	Attila Czene (56.55); Norbert Rózsa (1:00.64); Péter Horváth (53.14); Attila Zubor (49.20)	3:39.53	
4	Germany	Stev Theloke (55.24); Jens Kruppa (1:01.58); Christian Keller (53.61); Torsten Spanneberg (49.14)	3:39.57	
5	Great Britain	Neil Willey (56.37); Richard Maden (1:02.44); James Hickman (52.44); Gavin Meadows (50.41)	3:41.66	
6	Russia	Vladimir Selkov (56.30); Andrey Korneyev (1:02.12); Denis Pimankov (53.53); Alexander Popov (50.00)	3:41.85	
7	Japan	Keitaro Konnai (55.84); Yoshinobu Miyazaki (1:02.99); Takashi Yamamoto (53.24); Shunsuke Ito (50.07)	3:42.14	
8	Poland	Mariusz Siembida (55.98); Marek Krawczyk (1:02.84); Marcin Kaczmarek (54.89); Bartosz Kizierowski (49.44)	3:43.11	

== See also ==
- Swimming at the 1996 Summer Olympics – Men's 4 × 100 metre medley relay (Atlanta)
- 1997 FINA Short Course World Championships – Men's 4x100m Medley Relay (Gothenburg)
- Swimming at the 1997 European Aquatics Championships – Men's 4 x 100 metre medley relay (Seville)
- Swimming at the 2000 Summer Olympics – Men's 4 × 100 metre medley relay (Sydney)
