= Zhu Yi =

Zhu Yi is the name of the following Chinese people:

- Zhu Yi (Eastern Wu), (朱異; d. 257), officer of Wu in Three Kingdoms period
- Zhu Yi (Liang dynasty), (朱異; 483–539), official of the Liang dynasty
- Zhu Yi (swimmer), Olympic swimmer born 1977
- Zhu Yi (figure skater), (朱易; b. 2002), US-born Chinese figure skater
