= List of Malaysian records in swimming =

There are two different kinds of swimming records in Malaysia and certified by Malaysia Swimming (MAS):

- National record, more commonly referred to in Malaysia as the rekod kebangsaan: the best time recorded anywhere in the world by a swimmer or team holding Malaysian citizenship. So far Malaysia Swimming maintains an official list only in long course events.
- Malaysian All-Comers record: the best time recorded within Malaysia by a swimmer or team regardless of nationality.

== Current Malaysian national records ==
=== Long course (50 metres) ===
==== Men ====
Event	Time		Name	Club	Date	Meet	Location	Ref
50 m freestyle	22.48		Tong Yu Jing	Malaysia	11 December 2025	Southeast Asian Games	Bangkok, Thailand	
100 m freestyle	49.54	h	Welson Sim	Sarawak	26 April 2019	Malaysia Open Championships	Kuala Lumpur, Malaysia	
200 m freestyle	1:47.36	r	Welson Sim	Malaysia	24 August 2017	Southeast Asian Games	Kuala Lumpur, Malaysia	
400 m freestyle	3:47.38		Khiew Hoe Yean	Malaysia	17 July 2025	World University Games	Berlin, Germany	
800 m freestyle	8:01.30		Khiew Hoe Yean	Malaysia	19 April 2024	Australian Championships	Gold Coast, Australia	
1500 m freestyle	15:21.92		Khiew Hoe Yean	Malaysia	10 December 2023	Queensland Championships	Brisbane, Australia	
50 m backstroke	25.60	sf	Tern Jian Han	Malaysia	7 April 2018	Commonwealth Games	Gold Coast, Australia	
100 m backstroke	54.77	sf	Alex Lim	Malaysia	21 July 2003	World Championships	Barcelona, Spain	
200 m backstroke	2:00.80		Khiew Hoe Yean	WP Kuala Lumpur	12 June 2021	Malaysia Open Championships	Kuala Lumpur, Malaysia	
50 m breaststroke	27.40		Andrew Goh	Selangor	21 August 2024	Sukma Games	Sarawak, Malaysia	
100 m breaststroke	1:01.39		Andrew Goh	Selangor	19 August 2024	Sukma Games	Sarawak, Malaysia	
200 m breaststroke	2:15.62		Elvin Chia	Malaysia	11 August 1999	Southeast Asian Games	Bandar Seri Begawan, Brunei	
50 m butterfly	24.08	h	Bryan Leong	Chelsea & Westminster	27 May 2024	AP Race London International	London, United Kingdom	
100 m butterfly	52.78	h	Bryan Leong	Malaysia	16 February 2024	World Championships	Doha, Qatar	
200 m butterfly	1:58.99	h	Daniel Bego	Malaysia	28 July 2009	World Championships	Rome, Italy	
200m individual medley	2:03.29		Khiew Hoe Yean	WP Kuala Lumpur	27 April 2025	Malaysia Open Championships	Kuala Lumpur, Malaysia	
400m individual medley	4:23.24		Tan Khai Xin	Malaysia	8 May 2023	Southeast Asian Games	Phnom Penh, Cambodia	
4×100m freestyle relay	3:20.61		Lim Yin Chuen (50.57); Arvin Shaun Singh Chahal (49.64); Khiew Hoe Yean (50.07); Terence Ng Shin Jian (50.33)	Malaysia	10 May 2023	Southeast Asian Games	Phnom Penh, Cambodia	
4×200m freestyle relay	7:18.79		Khiew Hoe Yean (1:48.73); Arvin Shaun Singh Chahal (1:49.01); Lim Yin Chuen (1:50.16); Tan Khai Xin (1:50.89)	Malaysia	21 September 2026	Asian Games	Tokyo, Japan	
4×100m medley relay	3:41.92		Khiew Hoe Yean (56.59); Andrew Goh (1:02.25); Bryan Leong (53.81); Arvin Shaun Singh Chahal (49.27)	Malaysia	12 December 2025	Southeast Asian Games	Bangkok, Thailand	

Legend: # – Record awaiting ratification by Amateur Swimming Union of Malaysia; WR – World record; AS – Asian record; CR – Commonwealth record; e – equalled existing record;
Records not set in finals: h – heat; sf – semifinal; r – relay 1st leg; rh – relay heat 1st leg; b – B final; † – en route to final mark; so – swim-off; tt – time trial

==== Women ====
Event	Time		Name	Club	Date	Meet	Location	Ref
50m freestyle	25.82		Chui Lai Kwan	Malaysia	11 June 2015	Southeast Asian Games	Singapore	
100m freestyle	56.78		Eliza Tan	Selangor	20 August 2026	Sukma Games	Shah Alam, Malaysia	
200m freestyle	2:03.22		Khoo Cai Lin	-	17 May 2013	Malaysia Invitation Open	Kuala Lumpur, Malaysia	
400m freestyle	4:10.75		Khoo Cai Lin	Malaysia	11 Dec 2009	Southeast Asian Games	Vientiane, Laos	
800m freestyle	8:45.36		Khoo Cai Lin	Malaysia	12 Dec 2009	Southeast Asian Games	Vientiane, Laos	
1500m freestyle	17:07.64		Goh Chia Tong	Malaysia	18 May 2022	Southeast Asian Games	Hanoi, Vietnam	
50m backstroke	29.32	b	Chong Xin Lin	Malaysia	13 June 2024	Singapore Championships	Singapore, Singapore	
100m backstroke	1:03.62	r	Chong Xin Lin	Malaysia	15 December 2025	Southeast Asian Games	Bangkok, Thailand	
100m backstroke	1:03.50	#	Chong Xin Lin	Malaysia	20 September 2026	SXL Elite Invitational	Kuala Lumpur, Malaysia	
200m backstroke	2:17.39		Lew Yih Wey	Malaysia	7 Dec 2007	Southeast Asian Games	Nakhon Ratchasima, Thailand	
50m breaststroke	31.40	h, =	Phee Jinq En	Malaysia	6 December 2019	Southeast Asian Games	New Clark City, Philippines	
50m breaststroke	31.40	=	Phee Jinq En	Malaysia	6 December 2019	Southeast Asian Games	New Clark City, Philippines	
100m breaststroke	1:08.40	h	Phee Jinq En	Malaysia	25 July 2021	Olympic Games	Tokyo, Japan	
200m breaststroke	2:27.80	h	Siow Yi Ting	Malaysia	13 Aug 2008	Olympic Games	Beijing, China	
50m butterfly	27.45		Marellyn Liew	-	3 May 2008	Malaysian Championships	Kuala Lumpur, Malaysia	
100m butterfly	1:01.04		Marellyn Liew	Malaysia	12 Dec 2009	Southeast Asian Games	Vientiane, Laos	
200m butterfly	2:14.30		Khoo Cai Lin	Malaysia	10 Dec 2009	Southeast Asian Games	Vientiane, Laos	
200m individual medley	2:14.57		Siow Yi Ting	Malaysia	10 Dec 2009	Southeast Asian Games	Vientiane, Laos	
400m individual medley	4:50.52		Lew Yih Wey	-	1 May 2008	Malaysian Championships	Kuala Lumpur, Malaysia	
4 × 100 m freestyle relay	3:51.40		Leung Chii Lin (58.23); Chui Lai Kwan (57.55); Siow Yi Ting (58.55); Khoo Cai Lin (57.07)	Malaysia	11 Dec 2009	Southeast Asian Games	Vientiane, Laos	
4 × 200 m freestyle relay	8:27.13		Khoo Cai Lin (2:05.49); Heidi Gan (2:07.83); Lew Yih Wey (2:06.94); Ong Ming Xiu (2:06.87)	Malaysia	7 Dec 2007	Southeast Asian Games	Nakhon Ratchasima, Thailand	
4 × 100 m medley relay	4:12.81		Chong Xin Lin (1:03.62); Phee Jinq En (1:09.36); Lim Shun Qi (1:00.97); Wong Shi Qi (58.86)	Malaysia	15 December 2025	Southeast Asian Games	Bangkok, Thailand	

Legend: # – Record awaiting ratification by Amateur Swimming Union of Malaysia; WR – World record; AS – Asian record; CR – Commonwealth record; e – equalled existing record;
Records not set in finals: h – heat; sf – semifinal; r – relay 1st leg; rh – relay heat 1st leg; b – B final; † – en route to final mark; so – swim-off; tt – time trial

==== Mixed relay ====
Event	Time	Name	Club	Date	Meet	Location	Ref
4×50 m freestyle relay							
4×100 m freestyle relay							
4×50 m medley relay							
4×100 m medley relay							

Legend: # – Record awaiting ratification by Amateur Swimming Union of Malaysia; WR – World record; AS – Asian record; CR – Commonwealth record; e – equalled existing record;
Records not set in finals: h – heat; so – swim-off

=== Short course (25 metres) ===
==== Men ====
Event	Time		Name	Club	Date	Meet	Location	Ref
50m freestyle	22.27	h	Lim Yin Chuen	Malaysia	18 October 2024	World Cup	Shanghai, China	
100m freestyle	48.49	h	Lim Yin Chuen	Malaysia	11 December 2024	World Championships	Budapest, Hungary	
200m freestyle	1:45.01		Welson Sim	Malaysia	25 October 2019	Australian Championships	Melbourne, Australia	
400m freestyle	3:42.37		Khiew Hoe Yean	Malaysia	31 October 2024	World Cup	Singapore, Singapore	
800m freestyle	7:49.20		Dhuha Zulfikry	Ikan Bilis	5 July 2024	Malaysian Championships	Kuala Lumpur, Malaysia	
1500m freestyle	14:59.80		Dhuha Zulfikry	Malaysia	19 October 2024	World Cup	Shanghai, China	
50m backstroke	24.23	sf	Alex Lim	Malaysia	7 April 2006	World Championships	Shanghai, China	
100m backstroke	52.57	sf	Alex Lim	Malaysia	5 April 2006	World Championships	Shanghai, China	
200m backstroke	1:56.55		Khiew Hoe Yean	Malaysia	18 October 2024	World Cup	Shanghai, China	
50m breaststroke	27.34		Bryan Leong	Chelsea & Westminster	15 December 2023	Swim England National Winter Championships	Sheffield, United Kingdom	
100m breaststroke	1:00.23		Daniel Lim	Heriot-Watt	17 November 2019	Speedo BUCS Championships	Sheffield, United Kingdom	
200m breaststroke	2:10.62		Daniel Lim	Edinburgh University	9 December 2018	Scottish Open Championships	Edinburgh, United Kingdom	
50m butterfly	23.64	h	Bryan Leong	Malaysia	10 December 2024	World Championships	Budapest, Hungary	
100m butterfly	52.19		Bryan Leong	Chelsea & Westminster	14 December 2023	Swim England National Winter Championships	Sheffield, United Kingdom	
200m butterfly	1:56.80		Low Zheng Yong	Malaysia	23 October 2026	Malaysian Championships	Kuala Lumpur, Malaysia	
100m individual medley	55.49		Terence Ng	Pade-Supersharkz	7 July 2024	Malaysian Championships	Kuala Lumpur, Malaysia	
200m individual medley	1:59.60	h	Hii Puong Wei	Malaysia	1 November 2024	World Cup	Singapore, Singapore	
400m individual medley	4:16.09		Jayden Tan	Malaysia	2 November 2024	World Cup	Singapore, Singapore	
4×50m freestyle relay								
4×100m freestyle relay	3:17.23	h	Khiew Hoe Yean (49.20); Lim Yin Chuen (48.07); Terence Ng Shin Jian (48.98); Tan Khai Xin (50.98)	Malaysia	10 December 2024	World Championships	Budapest, Hungary	
4×200m freestyle relay	7:03.62	h	Khiew Hoe Yean (1:45.39); Lim Yin Chuen (1:45.72); Dhuha Zulfikry (1:45.89); Terence Ng Shin Jian (1:46.62)	Malaysia	13 December 2024	World Championships	Budapest, Hungary	
4×50m medley relay								
4×100m medley relay	3:37.39	h	Khiew Hoe Yean (53.71); Tan Khai Xin (1:02.74); Bryan Leong (52.65); Lim Yin Chuen (48.29)	Malaysia	15 December 2024	World Championships	Budapest, Hungary	

Legend: # – Record awaiting ratification by Amateur Swimming Union of Malaysia; WR – World record; AS – Asian record; CR – Commonwealth record; e – equalled existing record;
Records not set in finals: h – heat; sf – semifinal; r – relay 1st leg; rh – relay heat 1st leg; b – B final; † – en route to final mark; so – swim-off; tt – time trial

==== Women ====
Event	Time		Name	Club	Date	Meet	Location	Ref
50 m freestyle	25.58	h	Chui Lai Kwan	Malaysia	31 October 2024	World Cup	Singapore, Singapore	
100 m freestyle	56.84		Nadia Lim	Hamilton Aquatics Dubai	23 November 2025	Hamilton Aquatics Winter Wonder	Abu Dhabi, United Arab Emirates	
100 m freestyle	56.48	#	Nadia Lim	Kurenang	25 October 2026	Malaysian Championships	Kuala Lumpur, Malaysia	
200 m freestyle	2:03.38	h	Nadia Lim	Hamilton Aquatics Dubai	13 December 2025	Swim England National Winter Championships	Sheffield, United Kingdom	
200 m freestyle	1:59.19	#	Nadia Lim	Kurenang	24 October 2026	Malaysian Championships	Kuala Lumpur, Malaysia	
400 m freestyle	4:19.65	h	Khoo Cai Lin	Malaysia	6 November 2013	World Cup	Singapore	
800 m freestyle	8:42.73		Khoo Cai Lin	Malaysia	5 November 2013	World Cup	Singapore	
1500 m freestyle								
50 m backstroke	27.56		Chong Xin Lin	Dsa	4 July 2024	Malaysian Championships	Kuala Lumpur, Malaysia	
100 m backstroke	59.61		Chong Xin Lin	Malaysia	23 October 2026	Malaysian Championships	Kuala Lumpur, Malaysia	
200 m backstroke	2:13.61		Chong Xin Lin	Dsa	7 July 2024	Malaysian Championships	Kuala Lumpur, Malaysia	
50m breaststroke	31.05	h	Phee Jinq En	Malaysia	14 December 2024	World Championships	Budapest, Hungary	
100m breaststroke	1:06.86		Phee Jinq En	Dsas	5 July 2024	Malaysian Championships	Kuala Lumpur, Malaysia	
200m breaststroke	2:27.38		Phee Jinq En	Dsas	4 July 2024	Malaysian Championships	Kuala Lumpur, Malaysia	
50m butterfly	27.32		Wong Shi Qi	Dsa	30 August 2026	Singapore National Invitational	Singapore, Singapore	
100m butterfly	1:00.72		Shannon Tan	Selangor Aquatics	8 November 2025	Singaporean Championships	Singapore, Singapore	
200m butterfly	2:10.57		Shannon Tan	Selangor Aquatics	30 August 2026	Singapore National Invitational	Singapore, Singapore	
100m individual medley	1:02.77		Chong Xin Lin	Dsa	7 July 2024	Malaysian Championships	Kuala Lumpur, Malaysia	
200m individual medley	2:16.67		Tan Rou Xin	Kelab Renang Ezy	4 July 2024	Malaysian Championships	Kuala Lumpur, Malaysia	
400m individual medley	4:54.48		Tan Rou Xin	Kelab Renang Ezy	6 July 2024	Malaysian Championships	Kuala Lumpur, Malaysia	
4×50m freestyle relay								
4 × 100 m freestyle relay								
4 × 200 m freestyle relay								
4×50m medley relay								
4 × 100 m medley relay								

Legend: # – Record awaiting ratification by Amateur Swimming Union of Malaysia; WR – World record; AS – Asian record; CR – Commonwealth record; e – equalled existing record;
Records not set in finals: h – heat; sf – semifinal; r – relay 1st leg; rh – relay heat 1st leg; b – B final; † – en route to final mark; so – swim-off; tt – time trial

==== Mixed relay ====
Event	Time	Name	Club	Date	Meet	Location	Ref
4×50 m freestyle relay							
4×50 m medley relay							

Legend: # – Record awaiting ratification by Amateur Swimming Union of Malaysia; WR – World record; AS – Asian record; CR – Commonwealth record; e – equalled existing record;
Records not set in finals: h – heat; so – swim-off

== Current Malaysian All-Comers records ==
=== Long course (50 metres) ===
==== Men ====
Event	Time	Name	Nationality	Date	Meet	Location	Ref
50 m freestyle	22.58	Mark Foster	England	16 September 1998	Commonwealth Games	Kuala Lumpur, Malaysia	
100 m freestyle	49.43	Michael Klim	Australia	14 September 1998	Commonwealth Games	Kuala Lumpur, Malaysia	
200 m freestyle	1:46.70	Ian Thorpe	Australia	12 September 1998	Commonwealth Games	Kuala Lumpur, Malaysia	
400 m freestyle	3:44.35	Ian Thorpe	Australia	15 September 1998	Commonwealth Games	Kuala Lumpur, Malaysia	
800 m freestyle	8:12.74	Welson Sim	Malaysia	29 March 2015	Malaysia Open Championships	Kuala Lumpur, Malaysia	
1500 m freestyle	14:50.92	Grant Hackett	Australia	17 September 1998	Commonwealth Games	Kuala Lumpur, Malaysia	
50 m backstroke							
100 m backstroke	55.52	Mark Versfeld	Canada	16 September 1998	Commonwealth Games	Kuala Lumpur, Malaysia	
200 m backstroke	1:59.67	Mark Versfeld	Canada	14 September 1998	Commonwealth Games	Kuala Lumpur, Malaysia	
50 m breaststroke	27.40	Andrew Goh	Malaysia	21 August 2024	Sukma Games	Sarawak, Malaysia	
100 m breaststroke	1:01.39	Andrew Goh	Malaysia	19 August 2024	Sukma Games	Sarawak, Malaysia	
200 m breaststroke	2:13.13	Simon Cowley	Australia	15 September 1998	Commonwealth Games	Kuala Lumpur, Malaysia	
50 m butterfly							
100 m butterfly	52.81	Geoff Huegill	Australia	13 September 1998	Commonwealth Games	Kuala Lumpur, Malaysia	
200 m butterfly	1:57.11	James Hickman	England	16 September 1998	Commonwealth Games	Kuala Lumpur, Malaysia	
200 m individual medley	2:00.26	Matthew Dunn	Australia	17 September 1998	Commonwealth Games	Kuala Lumpur, Malaysia	
400 m individual medley	4:19.89	Trent Steed	Australia	13 September 1998	Commonwealth Games	Kuala Lumpur, Malaysia	
4 × 100 m freestyle relay	3:17.83	Ashley Callus; Chris Fydler; Ian Thorpe; Michael Klim	Australia	15 September 1998	Commonwealth Games	Kuala Lumpur, Malaysia	
4 × 200 m freestyle relay	7:11.86	Daniel Kowalski; Ian Thorpe; Matthew Dunn; Michael Klim	Australia	13 September 1998	Commonwealth Games	Kuala Lumpur, Malaysia	
4 × 100 m medley relay	3:38.52	Josh Watson; Geoff Huegill; Simon Cowley; Michael Klim	Australia	17 September 1998	Commonwealth Games	Kuala Lumpur, Malaysia	

Legend: # – Record awaiting ratification by Amateur Swimming Union of Malaysia; WR – World record; AS – Asian record; CR – Commonwealth record; e – equalled existing record;
Records not set in finals: h – heat; sf – semifinal; r – relay 1st leg; rh – relay heat 1st leg; b – B final; † – en route to final mark; so – swim-off; tt – time trial

==== Women ====
Event	Time	Name	Nationality	Date	Meet	Location	Ref
50 m freestyle	25.82	Sue Rolph	England	17 September 1998	Commonwealth Games	Kuala Lumpur, Malaysia	
100 m freestyle	55.17	Sue Rolph	England	12 September 1998	Commonwealth Games	Kuala Lumpur, Malaysia	
200 m freestyle	2:00.24	Susie O'Neill	Australia	13 September 1998	Commonwealth Games	Kuala Lumpur, Malaysia	
400 m freestyle	4:12.39	Susie O'Neill	Australia	14 September 1998	Commonwealth Games	Kuala Lumpur, Malaysia	
800 m freestyle	8:42.23	Rachel Harris	Australia	16 September 1998	Commonwealth Games	Kuala Lumpur, Malaysia	
1500 m freestyle							
50 m backstroke							
100 m backstroke	1:02.43	Giaan Rooney	Australia	14 September 1998	Commonwealth Games	Kuala Lumpur, Malaysia	
200 m backstroke	2:13.18	Katy Sexton	England	17 September 1998	Commonwealth Games	Kuala Lumpur, Malaysia	
50 m breaststroke							
100 m breaststroke	1:08.65	Phee Jinq En	Malaysia	5 May 2016	Malaysia Open	Selangor, Malaysia	
200 m breaststroke	2:27.30	Samantha Riley	Australia	13 September 1998	Commonwealth Games	Kuala Lumpur, Malaysia	
50 m butterfly	27.45	Marellyn Liew	Malaysia	3 May 2008	Malaysian Championships	Kuala Lumpur, Malaysia	
100 m butterfly	59.42	Petria Thomas	Australia	15 September 1998	Commonwealth Games	Kuala Lumpur, Malaysia	
200 m butterfly	2:06.60	Susie O'Neill	Australia	17 September 1998	Commonwealth Games	Kuala Lumpur, Malaysia	
200 m individual medley	2:15.05	Marianne Limpert	Canada	16 September 1998	Commonwealth Games	Kuala Lumpur, Malaysia	
400 m individual medley	4:43.74	Joanne Malar	Canada	12 September 1998	Commonwealth Games	Kuala Lumpur, Malaysia	
4 × 100 m freestyle relay	3:42.61	Lori Munz; Rebecca Creedy; Sarah Ryan; Susie O'Neill	Australia	14 September 1998	Commonwealth Games	Kuala Lumpur, Malaysia	
4 × 200 m freestyle relay	8:03.73	Anna Windsor; Julia Greville; Lori Munz; Susie O'Neill	Australia	12 September 1998	Commonwealth Games	Kuala Lumpur, Malaysia	
4 × 100 m medley relay	4:06.36	Giaan Rooney; Helen Denman; Petria Thomas; Susie O'Neill	Australia	16 September 1998	Commonwealth Games	Kuala Lumpur, Malaysia	

Legend: # – Record awaiting ratification by Amateur Swimming Union of Malaysia; WR – World record; AS – Asian record; CR – Commonwealth record; e – equalled existing record;
Records not set in finals: h – heat; sf – semifinal; r – relay 1st leg; rh – relay heat 1st leg; b – B final; † – en route to final mark; so – swim-off; tt – time trial

==== Mixed relay ====
Event	Time	Name	Nationality	Date	Meet	Location	Ref
4×50 m freestyle relay							
4×100 m freestyle relay							
4×50 m medley relay							
4×100 m medley relay							

Legend: # – Record awaiting ratification by Amateur Swimming Union of Malaysia; WR – World record; AS – Asian record; CR – Commonwealth record; e – equalled existing record;
Records not set in finals: h – heat; so – swim-off
