= Kyung-hwan =

- Hangul: 경환
- RR: Gyeonghwan
- MR: Kyŏnghwan

Kyung-hwan, also spelled Kyoung-hwan or Kyung-hwan, is a Korean given name.

People with this name include:

- Choi Kyoung-hwan (born 1955), South Korean politician
- Park Kyung-hwan (born 1976), South Korean footballer
- Heo Kyung-hwan (born 1981), South Korean comedian
- Joe Kyong-fan (born 1982), South Korean swimmer
- Lee Kyung-hwan (1988–2012), South Korean footballer
- Pyon Kyong-hwan, North Korean politician elected in the 2014 North Korean parliamentary election
- Jeong Gyeong-hwan, screen name MaRin, South Korean League of Legends player

== See also ==
- List of Korean given names
