= Nguyễn Ngọc Anh =

Nguyễn Ngọc Anh may refer to:

- Nguyễn Ngọc Anh (swimmer) (born 1981), Vietnamese swimmer
- Nguyễn Ngọc Anh (footballer) (born 1988), Vietnamese football player

== See also ==
- Nguyễn Thị Ngọc Anh (born 1985), Vietnamese footballer
