= Abderzak Bella =

Algerian swimmer

Personal information
- Born: 26 September 1970 (age 54)

Sport
- Sport: Swimming

Abderzak Bella (born 26 September 1970) is an Algerian swimmer. He competed in the men's 100 metre breaststroke and men's 200 metre breaststroke events at the 1992 Summer Olympics.
