= Charalambos Panagidis =

Cypriot swimmer (born 1968)

Personal information
- Born: 9 September 1968 (age 57)

Sport
- Sport: Swimming

Charalambos Panagidis (born 9 September 1968) is a Cypriot swimmer. He competed in the men's 100 metre breaststroke event at the 1992 Summer Olympics.
