= Swimming at the 2025 SEA Games – Men's 4 × 100 metre medley relay =

Men's 4x100 metre medley relay at the 2025 SEA Games
- Venue: SAT Swimming Pool
- Date: 12 December
- Competitors: 5 from 5 nations
- Winning time: 3:38.47

Medalists
gold medal	Quah Zheng Wen, Chan Chun Ho, Jonathan Tan, Mikkel Lee	Singapore
silver medal	Tonnam Kanteemool, Rachasil Mahamongkol, Surasit Thongdeang, Pongpanod Trithan	Thailand
bronze medal	Cao Văn Dũng, Phạm Thanh Bảo, Nguyễn Viết Tường, Luong Jérémie Loïc Nino	Vietnam

The men's 4 × 100 metre medley relay event at the 2025 SEA Games took place on 12 December 2025 at the SAT Swimming Pool in Bangkok, Thailand.

== Schedule ==
All times are Indochina Standard Time (UTC+07:00)

Date	Time	Event
Friday, 12 December 2025	19:45	Final

== Records ==
Prior to this competition, the existing world, Asian, and Southeast Asian Games records were as follows.

World Record	United States; Ryan Murphy (52.31); Michael Andrew (58.49); Caeleb Dressel (49.03); Zach Apple (46.95)	3:26.78	Tokyo, Japan	1 August 2021
Asian Record	China; Xu Jiayu (52.05); Qin Haiyang (57.63); Wang Changhao (50.68); Pan Zhanle (46.65)	3:27.01	Hangzhou, China	26 September 2023
Games Record	Singapore; Quah Zheng Wen (55.31); Nicholas Mahabir (1:00.68); Teong Tzen Wei (52.79); Jonathan Tan (48.67)	3:37.45	Phnom Penh, Cambodia	8 May 2023

== Results ==
=== Final ===
Rank	Lane	Swimmer	Nationality	Time	Notes
1st place, gold medalist(s)	4	Quah Zheng Wen (54.95); Chan Chun Ho (1:01.64); Jonathan Tan (53.79); Mikkel Lee (48.09)	Singapore	3:38.47	
2nd place, silver medalist(s)	5	Tonnam Kanteemool (55.79); Rachasil Mahamongkol (1:02.31); Surasit Thongdeang (53.19); Pongpanod Trithan (48.99)	Thailand	3:40.28	NR
3rd place, bronze medalist(s)	6	Cao Văn Dũng (57.19); Phạm Thanh Bảo (1:00.20); Nguyễn Viết Tường (54.68); Luong Jérémie Loïc Nino (49.27)	Vietnam	3:41.34	
4	2	Jason Donovan Yusuf (56.29); Muhammad Dwiky Raharjo (1:01.96); Joe Aditya Wijaya Kurniawan (53.16); Kevin Erlangga Prayitno (50.34)	Indonesia	3:41.75	
5	3	Khiew Hoe Yean (56.59); Andrew Goh (1:02.25); Bryan Xin Ren Leong (53.81); Arvin Shaun Singh Chahal (49.27)	Malaysia	3:41.92	NR
