= Chen Cho-yi =

Taiwanese swimmer (born 1985)

Personal information
- Full name: Chen Cho-yi
- Nickname: Joey
- National team: Chinese Taipei
- Born: 22 January 1985 (age 41) Keelung, Taiwan
- Height: 1.80 m (5 ft 11 in)
- Weight: 72 kg (159 lb)

Sport
- Sport: Swimming
- Strokes: Breaststroke
- College team: National Taiwan University

Chen Cho-yi (Chinese: 陳卓逸; pinyin: Chén Zhuōyì; born 22 January 1985) is a Taiwanese Olympic swimmer, bioinformatician, and computational biologist. He is now a postdoctoral research fellow at the Dana–Farber Cancer Institute (DFCI), Harvard University.

== Education and early life ==
Chen was born in Taipei, Taiwan. He received his bachelor's degree and master's degrees in Computer Science and Bioinformatics at National Taiwan University (NTU) in 2007 and 2009, respectively. He later served at Academia Sinica in 2009–2012. In 2014, granted by Ministry of Science and Technology (Taiwan), he visited University of Pittsburgh for one-year visiting research. He received his doctorate degree in Genome and Systems Biology at National Taiwan University in 2015.

== Swimming career ==
Chen has represented his country in several international sporting events. He finished fourth in the final of the 200 m breaststroke at the 2001 East Asian Games in Osaka, Japan. He won two gold medals in 100 and 200 m breaststroke at the 2002 ISF World Gymnasiade in Caen, France. In the same year, he was decorated with Guo-Guang Sports Medal from the Executive Yuan for his achievement in World Gymnasiade. Chen is an eighth-place finalist in the 100 m breaststroke at the 2002 Asian Games in Busan, South Korea, having been disqualified for an illegal dolphin kick.

Chen qualified for the men's 100 m breaststroke at the 2004 Summer Olympics in Athens, by achieving a FINA B-standard of 1:04.66 from the National University Games in Taipei. He challenged seven other swimmers in heat three, including 15-year-old Nguyen Huu Viet of Vietnam. He edged out New Zealand's Ben Labowitch to take a second seed by five hundredths of a second (0.05), posting his lifetime best of 1:03.94. Chen failed to advance into the semifinals, as he placed thirty-fifth overall out of 60 swimmers on the first day of preliminaries.

== Awards and honors ==
- Sportsmanship Award, National Intercollegiate Athletic Games, 2011
- Outstanding College Youth of the Republic of China, 2007
- National Taiwan University Outstanding College Youth, 2007
- Scholarship for Outstanding Performance, National Taiwan University, 2006
- Chinese Chia-Hsin Sports Scholarship, 2003, 2005
- Guo-Guang Sports Medal, the Republic of China, 2002
