= Nelson Diebel =

American swimmer (born 1970)

Personal information
- Full name: Nelson Diebel III
- National team: United States
- Born: November 9, 1970 (age 55) Hinsdale, Illinois, U.S.
- Height: 6 ft 0 in (1.83 m)
- Weight: 185 lb (84 kg)

Sport
- Sport: Swimming
- Strokes: Breaststroke
- College team: Princeton University
- Coach: Chris Martin (Peddie); C. Rob Orr (Princeton)
Medal record
Men's swimming
Representing the United States
Olympic Games
Gold medal – first place	1992 Barcelona	100 m breaststroke
Gold medal – first place	1992 Barcelona	4x100 m medley relay
Pan Pacific Championships
Silver medal – second place	1989 Tokyo	200 m breaststroke
Pan American Games
Silver medal – second place	1991 Havana	200 m breaststroke

Nelson W. Diebel (born November 9, 1970) is an American former competition swimmer, Olympic champion, and former world record-holder.

Nelson Diebel III was born on November 9, 1970 in Hinsdale, Illinois, to Nelson W. Diebel Jr., a History professor at nearby Moraine Valley Community College, and Marge Diebel, a stockbroker. Nelson grew up in Western Springs, a suburb of Chicago. Several accounts link Nelson's youthful rebellious behavior to his parents' divorce around 1982 when he was 12. Nelson attended McClure Junior High, already showing a certain rebellious nature. He began high school at Lyons Township High School in Western Springs, where Nelson noted he may have been in a few fights. After a case of pneumonia led him to miss 11 weeks of his Freshman year at Lyons Township, his mother Marge arranged for him to attend the Kent School, a private boarding school in Kent, Connecticut. Six weeks later he was expelled for fighting. Some of his high school years included poor grades, late nights, issues with drinking and marijuana, and a few car accidents.

== Peddie School ==
Diebel's mother, who hoped for the best but was well aware of Nelson's behavioral issues, arranged for him to attend the Peddie School in Hightstown, New Jersey beginning in December, 1986, where the 16-year old would swim under talented first year Head Coach Chris Martin. Martin told Diebel he could use him on the swim team but he would have to do exactly what he was told, and if he was looking to fight, he could fight the rather large, strong, and imposing 6 foot 4 inch, 225 pound, Martin. Martin coached the Peddie School from 1986-1992, and in a few years succeeded in restoring the school's place as a national leader in swimming among private schools. He would coach at the University of Florida in 1992. Diebel and Martin eventually reached an understanding.

Only six months after arriving at Peddie, Diebel won a national championship, and a year later made it to the finals of the 1988 Olympic trials in the 100 and 200 breaststroke. He performed well, but did not make the U.S. team. Six weeks after the trials, he slipped while diving from the Peddie stands into the pool, and landed on a balcony, breaking both wrists. He required hours of surgery, and several pins, but managed to recover.

As a Junior at Peddie, Nelson won the first of his four Eastern Championships, beginning with the 100-yard breaststroke. One month later, he won the first of his four national championships by taking first in the 200-yard breaststroke in open competition in Nashville, Tennessee. A repetitive stress injury in his High School Senior year due to poor technique left him the option of surgery, or toughing it out for the rigorous training required for the Olympic trials. Diebel chose the latter.

As a Peddie senior, Nelson won three Eastern titles, setting the National High School record in the 100 yard breaststroke. At the Senior level, he was indoor champion in the 200 breast for the second year, and added the 100 title to his victories.

In pre-Olympic international competition, Diebel won silver medals in the 200 breaststroke at the 1989 Pan Pacifics and the 1991 Pan American Games. Training hard for the Olympics, in March 1992, he swam a 54.48 for the 100-meter freestyle, setting the American record, but adding stress to his body.

While preparing for the 1992 trials during his Freshman year at Princeton, Diebel did less well absent the motivating force that his former coach Chris Martin had provided. He did not perform well at the 1991 Pan American games in Cuba. He began to suffer from chronic tendinitis in the rotator cuff and biceps tendon of his right shoulder, requiring him to reduce the intensity of training required to prepare for the Olympic trials.

== 1992 Barcelona Olympic gold medals ==
In the 1992 Olympic trials, Diebel finished fourth in his specialty, the 200-meter breaststroke. But he set a new American record in the 100-meter breaststroke of 1:01.49, easily qualifying him for the Olympics.

Diebel won two gold medals at the 1992 Summer Olympics in Barcelona, Spain. First, he won the men's 100-meter breaststroke, setting a new Olympic record of 1:01.50 in the event final. It was made more memorable as it was the first American gold medal of the Barcelona games. Only third after the first 50-meters, Diebel took the lead in the final 50 with Hungary's Norbert Rozsa, who held the world record, taking second.

Afterward, he swam the breaststroke leg for the winning U.S. team in the men's 4×100-meter medley relay, together with fellow Americans Jeff Rouse (backstroke), Pablo Morales (butterfly) and Jon Olsen (freestyle). In the event final, the four Americans matched the world record of 3:36.93 set by the U.S. team at the 1988 Summer Olympics.

=== Princeton University ===
He enrolled in Princeton University, ten miles from the Peddie School, where he trained and competed for the Princeton Tigers swim team under coach C. Rob Orr, a former All American and then Assistant Coach at the University of Southern California. Orr coached Princeton Swimming from 1979-2019, establishing an exceptional record of wins in dual meets. After his Freshman year at Princeton, and his Olympic medals, Diebel retired from swimming, to focus on the outstanding academics at Princeton. He had chosen Princeton for the quality of their academic program, and because Coach Orr allowed him the flexibility of training for the more competitive meets required of an elite Olympic candidate. Diebel would major in History at Princeton.

After Princeton, he worked as a featured coach and speaker at varied training clinics, and then as a motivational speaker. He later settled in Delaware, and worked in the income tax preparation business. He recently started coaching, and noted that he truly enjoyed mentoring young swimmers as a coach.

== See also ==
- List of multiple Olympic gold medalists at a single Games
- List of Olympic medalists in swimming (men)
- List of Princeton University Olympians
- List of Princeton University people
- World record progression 4 × 100 metres medley relay
