= Davide Rummolo =

Italian swimmer (born 1977)

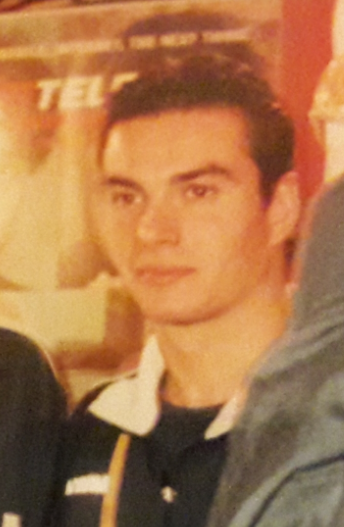

Personal information
- Full name: Davide Rummolo
- Nationality: Italy
- Born: 12 November 1977 (age 48) Naples
- Height: 1.80 m (5 ft 11 in)

Sport
- Sport: Swimming
- Strokes: Breaststroke
- Club: Centro Sportivo Carabinieri, Roma
Medal record
Men's swimming
Representing Italy
Olympic Games
Bronze medal – third place	2000 Sydney	200 m breaststroke
European Championships (LC)
Gold medal – first place	2002 Berlin	200 m breaststroke
European Championships (SC)
Gold medal – first place	2002 Riesa	200 m breaststroke
Summer Universiade
Gold medal – first place	2001 Beijing	200 m breaststroke

Davide Rummolo (born 12 November 1977, in Naples) is an Italian swimmer who won the bronze medal in the 200 metres breaststroke at the 2000 Summer Olympics. In 2002 he became the European champion in the 200 m breaststroke.
