= Malaysia Swimming Federation =

Sports governing body in Malaysia

- Abbreviation: MAS/MS
- Affiliation: Federation Internationale de Natation
- Location: Bukit Jalil, Kuala Lumpur, Malaysia
- President: Shahidan Kassim
- Secretary: Andy Low
- Sponsor: Milo

Official website
- www.malaysiaaquatics.org
- (Malaysia)

Malaysia Swimming Federation (Malay: Persekutuan Renang Malaysia) is the national governing body of swimming, water polo, synchronised swimming, diving and open water in Malaysia. Founded as the Amateur Swimming Union of Malaysia (ASUM) (Malay: Persatuan Renang Amatur Malaysia), the body adopted its current name in July 2020. It is charged with selecting Malaysia Olympic Swimming team and any other teams which officially represent Malaysia, as well as the overall organization and operation of the sport within the country. The national headquarters is located at the National Aquatic Centre, National Sports Complex in Bukit Jalil, Kuala Lumpur.

ASUM logo.

== Championships ==
Amateur Swimming Union of Malaysia organises championships every year in each of the sporting disciplines.

=== Swimming ===
Long course

Malaysia Open Swimming Championships (50 m) are usually held in May each year.

Edition	Year	Dates	Venue	Notes	Ref
51	2008	1–4 May	National Aquatic Centre, Bukit Jalil		
52	2009	14–17 May	National Aquatic Centre, Bukit Jalil		
53	2010	20–23 May	National Aquatic Centre, Bukit Jalil		
54	2011	12–15 May	National Aquatic Centre, Bukit Jalil		
55	2012	3–6 May	National Aquatic Centre, Bukit Jalil		
56	2013	16–19 May	National Aquatic Centre, Bukit Jalil		
57	2014	8–11 May	National Aquatic Centre, Bukit Jalil		
58	2015	26–29 March	National Aquatic Centre, Bukit Jalil		

== See also ==
- List of Malaysian records in swimming
