= Roque Santos =

American swimmer (born 1968)

Personal information
- Full name: James Roque Santos
- Nickname: Roque
- National team: United States
- Born: January 8, 1968 (age 58) Chico, California
- Height: 6 ft 1 in (1.85 m)
- Weight: 174 lb (79 kg)

Sport
- Sport: Swimming
- Strokes: Breaststroke
- Club: Nation's Capital Swim Club
- College team: University of California, Berkeley

Roque James Santos (born January 8, 1968) is an American former competition swimmer who represented the United States at the 1992 Summer Olympics in Barcelona, Spain. Santos competed in the B Final of the men's 200-meter breaststroke and finished with the twelfth-best time overall.

== See also ==
- List of University of California, Berkeley alumni
