= Jason Hender =

British swimmer

Personal information
- Born: 26 April 1971 (age 55) Manchester, England

Sport
- Sport: Swimming

Jason Hender (born 26 April 1971) is a British swimmer. He competed in the men's 200 metre breaststroke event at the 1992 Summer Olympics.
