= Bernard Desmarais =

Mauritian swimmer (born 1971)

Personal information
- Born: 17 June 1971 (age 55)

Sport
- Sport: Swimming
Medal record
Men's swimming
Representing Mauritius
All-Africa Games
| Bronze medal – third place | 1991 Cairo | 100 m breaststroke |

Bernard Desmarais (born 17 June 1971) is a Mauritian swimmer. He represented his country at the 1992 and 1996 Olympics. In 1992, he competed in the 100 metre and 200 metre breaststroke competitions, but finished 45th in each event with times of 1:07.75 and 2:31.52 respectively. In 1996, he competed only in the 100 metre breaststroke event and finished 43rd out of 45 competitors with a time of 1:09.05.
