= Ryan Mitchell (swimmer) =

Australian swimmer (born 1977)

Personal information
- Full name: Ryan Scott Mitchell
- National team: Australia
- Born: 24 April 1977 (age 49) Port Augusta, South Australia
- Height: 1.85 m (6 ft 1 in)
- Weight: 77 kg (170 lb)

Sport
- Sport: Swimming
- Strokes: Breaststroke
Medal record
Men's swimming
Representing Australia
Olympic Games
Silver medal – second place	2000 Sydney	4×100 m medley
World Championships (SC)
Silver medal – second place	1995 Rio	200 m breaststroke
Silver medal – second place	1999 Hong Kong	200 m breaststroke
Commonwealth Games
Silver medal – second place	1998 Kuala Lumpur	200 m breaststroke

Ryan Scott Mitchell (born 24 April 1977) is an Australian breaststroke swimmer of the 1990s, who won a silver medal at the 2000 Summer Olympics in Sydney as part of the 4×100-metre medley relay team. Ryan began his swimming career in Port Augusta, where the Ryan Mitchell municipal swimming center is named after him today.

== Early competitions ==
Growing up in Adelaide and being coached by Glenn Beringen at the South Australian Sports Institute, Mitchell made his debut at the 1994 Commonwealth Games in Victoria, British Columbia, Canada. He was the 1995 silver medalist in the 200-metre breaststroke at the world short course championships in Rio de Janeiro. He won selection to the national team for the 1996 Summer Olympics in Atlanta, after dead-heating with Phil Rogers to win the 200-metre breaststroke at the Australian Championships. In December of same year, Mirchell broke the world record for Men's 4×100-metre medley relay and the Australian & Commonwealth Shortcourse record for 200-metre breaststroke. He swam slower at the Olympics, finishing in eleventh place.

== Silver at the 2000 Olympics ==
At the 1998 World Aquatics Championships in Perth, Western Australia, Mitchell finished fifth in the 200-metre breaststroke and then won silver at the 1998 Commonwealth Games in Kuala Lumpur, behind fellow Australian Simon Cowley, who won both breaststroke events. He gained selection to the 2000 Summer Olympics in Sydney after winning the 200-metre event and finishing third in the 100-metre event.

At the Olympics, he finished eighth in the 200-metre breaststroke. After Australia's only 100-metre breaststroker Phil Rogers put in a poor performance in the individual event, Australian head coach Don Talbot dropped Rogers and Mitchell swam in the heats of the 4×100-metre medley relay, even though he was not originally selected in the 100m breaststroke. Mitchell was replaced in the final by Regan Harrison (who came fourth in the 200-metre breaststroke), who combined with Matt Welsh, Geoff Huegill and Michael Klim to claim silver, behind the Americans who broke the world record.

== Leadership role ==
In March 2002, Mitchell was appointed Chairman of the Australian Swimmers’ Commission, a professional association promoting the increasingly professional sport of swimming in that continent. Under his leadership, the Commission appointed its first General Manager on 28 July 2003 and the Australian Swimmers Association was officially incorporated on 24 September 2003. At this time the ASA expanded its Board to a ten-member executive committee of both current and former Australian swimmers. Mitchell continued to lead the organization until October 2009.

== See also ==
- List of Commonwealth Games medallists in swimming (men)
- List of Olympic medalists in swimming (men)
