= Duncan Todd =

Hong Kong swimmer

Personal information
- Born: 14 May 1975 (age 51)

Sport
- Sport: Swimming

Duncan Todd (born 14 May 1975) is a Hong Kong butterfly and medley swimmer. He competed in five events at the 1992 Summer Olympics.
