= Wu Tat Cheung =

Hong Kong swimmer

Personal information
- Born: 17 February 1974 (age 52)

Sport
- Sport: Swimming

Wu Tat Cheung (born 17 February 1974) is a Hong Kong freestyle swimmer. He competed in three events at the 1992 Summer Olympics.
