= Kyle Salyards =

American former competition swimmer (born 1980)

Personal information
- Full name: Mark Kyle Salyards
- National team: United States
- Born: December 17, 1980 (age 45) Lancaster, Pennsylvania, U.S.
- Education: University of Georgia; Consumer Economics (2005)
- Occupation: Food Sales
- Height: 5 ft 11 in (1.80 m)
- Weight: 170 lb (77 kg)
- Children: 1 son

Sport
- Sport: Swimming
- Event: 200 breaststroke
- Strokes: Breaststroke
- Club: Lancaster Aquatic Club (LAC); Tempe Rio Salado Swim Club
- College team: University of Georgia
- Coach: Andy Amway (Hempfield High School); John Pontz (LAC, Rio Salado SC); Jack Bauerle (U. Georgia); Mark Schubert (Olympics)
Medal record
Men's swimming
Representing the United States
Pan American Games
Gold medal – first place	2003 Santo Domingo	200 m breaststroke

Mark Kyle Salyards (born December 17, 1980) is an American former competition swimmer, who competed for the University of Georgia, and participated in the 2000 Summer Olympics in Sydney, Australia, placing sixth overall in the 200-meter breaststroke. Salyards had a memorable career swimming for Hempfield High School, graduating in 1999. He took a year off from enrolling at the University of Georgia on a swimming scholarship, to train for the 2000 Olympic trials at the Tempe Rio Salado Swim Club in Tempe, Arizona with former Coach John Pontz who had trained him at the Lancaster Aquatics Club during High School. Retiring from competitive swimming after the 2004 Olympic trials, in 2025 Salyards worked in commercial food sales in Lititz, Pennsylvania in his native Lancaster County.

Salyards was born December 17, 1980 in Lancaster, Pennsylvania to mother Deborah and father Mark. At the time of the 2000 Olympics, Deborah was working for the food service at his high school and a few other positions. His father Mark worked as an Electrician. An early sports enthusiast, he participated in soccer, basketball, and football through middle school, though he was also a swimming competitor. At only eight, Salyards was successfully competing in swimming against the occasional twelve-year-old. By 13, he swam with John Pontz at the Lancaster Aquatic Club, where he trained at the Golden Meadows Swim Center. Pontz, perhaps the coach most responsible for Salyards development, was a former swimmer for Hempfield High who after a shoulder injury ended his competitive career, took up coaching beginning in High School. Pontz later attended Penn State.

== Hempfield High School ==
In his early teens, Salyards enrolled as a Freshman at Lancaster County's Hempfield High School, graduating in 1999, where he soon focused exclusively on swimming under Hempfield's swimming Coach Andy Amway, and coach John Pontz, who continued to coach Salyards at the Lancaster Aquatic Club.

Swimming for Hempfield High, Salyards won letters each of his four years of participation, and won ten first place titles at the Pennsylvania Interscholastic Athletic Association (PIAA) State Championships during his High School career. In the 200 Individual Medley, as a multi-stroke competitor, he was a Pennsylvania State Champion a total of three times, and set a new state record in the event each year. He twice received a second-place finish in the 200-yard breaststroke at the State championships. At the State Meet in 1997, Salyards received honors as the Outstanding Swimmer. In 1999, after High School graduation, Salyards was ranked sixth in the world in the 200-yard breaststroke, and third or fourth in the U.S. In the 100-yard breaststroke, he was rated only twelfth. He knew he would need focused training to qualify for the 2000 U.S. Olympic trials in Indianapolis, and more substantial training to make the U.S. team with a chance at contending for an Olympic medal.

== 2000 Olympic trials ==
Salyards took a year after graduating high school in the Summer of 1999, to train for the 2000 Olympic trials, postponing his first year at the University of Georgia. He initially moved with his former Lancaster Aquatic Coach John Pontz to Orlando, Florida where he trained with the Patriot Aquatics Swim Club under Pontz. After four months, Pontz and Salyards realized Orlando was not the best environment for training and moved to Tempe, Arizona. Salyards continued to train for the 2000 Olympics for an additional eight months with the Tempe Rio Salado Swim Club in Tempe, Arizona where he continued to be managed by Coach Pontz, who had taken a coaching position at the club. During this period, he swam an early morning session of two hours and an afternoon session of two and a half hours in addition to two dryland training sessions of around one hour, with one after each workout.

At the mid-August 2000 U.S. Olympic trials in Indianapolis, Salyards won the finals of the 200-meter breaststroke, with a 2:13.21, with Tom Wilkins placing second as the only other qualifier with a time of 2:13.24. In an exceptionally close finish, the top four competitors were only .32 seconds apart. Salyards later considered qualifying for the U.S. Olympic team his most significant achievement, and noted that in the last 50 meters of the event, he swam with every bit of energy and focus he could muster.

== 2000 Sydney Olympics ==
Olympic Coach M. Schubert, '88

As one of the younger swimming competitors in breaststroke at 19, Salyards competed in the 200-meter breaststroke at the 2000 Sydney Olympics, staged at the Sydney International Aquatic Center in New South Wales. Salyards finished sixth in the event finals on September 20, 2000, with a time of 2:13:27, only around .5 seconds from contending for a metal. At Sydney, Salyards was coached and likely trained briefly under Hall of Fame Coach Mark Schubert who had previously been the women's coach at U. Texas, and the Head Coach at the University of Southern California.

In a typically close finish in the 200 breaststroke finals, Dominico Fioravanti of Italy, a slight favorite, took the 200 breaststroke gold medal with a time of 2:10.87, making him a champion in both the 100 and 200 Olympic breaststroke that year. His time approached the World record. Terence Parkin of the Republic of South Africa took the silver with a time of 2:12.50, and Davide Rummolo took the bronze with a time of 2:12.73. Earlier, Salyards had placed sixth in his first preliminary round, Heat 6, with a time of 2:15.57, and advanced to the semi-finals where he swam a 2:13.38, which allowed him to advance to the final rounds.

=== University of Georgia ===
Swimming for the University of Georgia on a swimming scholarship from around 2000-2004, under long serving Coach Jack Bauerle, Salyards received eleven All American honors, and continued to focus on breaststroke events. In the 200-yard breaststroke in both 2002 and 2003, he was a Southeastern Conference champion. He placed in a total of seven events at the Southeastern Conference Championships while at Georgia. In the 2004 season he earnedd honorable mentions in the 100-yard breaststroke, where he received a tie for 14th place, and another honorable mention in the and 200-yard breaststroke. He graduated U. Georgia in 2005, with a B.A. in consumer economics.

=== 2003 Pan Ams ===
Salyards finished first for the gold in the 200-meter breaststroke at the 2003 Pan American Games in Santo Domingo with a time of 2:13.37, a Pan Ams record at the time and very close to his Olympic finals time in the event.

Continuing to train, Salyards competed in the Olympic trials for the 2004 Athens Olympics in Long Beach California, but not making the team, soon retired. In a fast year for the 200-meter breaststroke, former 2000 trial competitor Brenden Hansen broke the world record at the trial finals for the event with a time of 2:09.04, with Scott Usher placing second with a time of 2:10.90.

=== Honors ===
Salyards was admitted to the Lancaster County Sports Hall of Fame in 2013, and is a member of the Hempfield High School Athletic Hall of Fame. In 2013, Salyards became a member of the Pennsylvania Sports Hall of Fame Susquehanna Chapter. His was a recipient of the 2024 J. Freeland Chryst Award from the Lancaster County Sports Hall of Fame, given to local athletes for athletic achievement.

In October 2024, Salyards lived in Lititz, Pennsylvania in Lancaster County, with his son born around 2019, and worked in commercial food sales, marketing a variety of food products to local restaurants. He stayed physically active as a runner and golfer.

== See also ==
- List of Olympic medalists in swimming (men)
- List of University of Georgia people
