= Mohamed Mukhesur Rahman =

Bangladeshi swimmer

Personal information
- Born: 1 February 1970 (age 56)

Sport
- Sport: Swimming

Mohamed Mukhesur Rahman (born 1 February 1970) is a Bangladeshi swimmer. He competed in the 200 m breaststroke at the 1992 Summer Olympics, Rahman finished in 52nd place in the heats so didn't advance any further.
