= Li Tsung-chueh =

Taiwanese swimmer (born 1980)

Personal information
- Full name: Li Tsung-chueh
- National team: Chinese Taipei
- Born: 13 April 1980 (age 46) Taipei, Taiwan
- Height: 1.72 m (5 ft 8 in)
- Weight: 64 kg (141 lb)

Sport
- Sport: Swimming
- Strokes: Breaststroke

Li Tsung-chueh (Chinese: 李 宗爵; pinyin: Li Zōngjué; born April 13, 1980) is a Taiwanese former swimmer, who specialized in breaststroke events. Li competed only in the men's 200 m breaststroke at the 2000 Summer Olympics in Sydney. He achieved a FINA B-standard of 2:19.10 from the National University Games in Taipei. He challenged seven other swimmers in heat three, including Costa Rica's two-time Olympian Juan José Madrigal. He raced to a second seed in 2:19.30, trailing South Korea's Joe Kyong-Fan, winner of his heat, by 11-hundredths of a second. Li failed to advance into the semifinals, as he placed thirtieth overall in the prelims.
