= Kelvin Li =

Hong Kong swimmer

Personal information
- Born: 28 January 1975 (age 51)

Sport
- Sport: Swimming

Kelvin Li (born 28 January 1975) is a Hong Kong freestyle swimmer. He competed in three events at the 1992 Summer Olympics.
