= Arthur Li (swimmer) =

Hong Kong swimmer (born 1972)

Personal information
- Full name: Kai Yien Li
- Born: 24 August 1972 (age 53)

Sport
- Sport: Swimming

Arthur Li (born 24 August 1972) is a Hong Kong butterfly, freestyle and medley swimmer. He competed at the 1988, 1992 and the 1996 Summer Olympics.
