= Joe Kyong-fan =

South Korean swimmer (born 1982)

Personal information
- Full name: Joe Kyong-fan
- National team: South Korea
- Born: 11 May 1982 (age 44) Seoul, South Korea
- Height: 1.84 m (6 ft 0 in)
- Weight: 77 kg (170 lb)

Korean name
- Hangul: 조경환
- RR: Jo Gyeonghwan
- MR: Cho Kyŏnghwan

Sport
- Sport: Swimming
- Strokes: Breaststroke

Joe Kyong-fan (Korean: 조경환; born May 11, 1982) is a South Korean former swimmer, who specialized in breaststroke events. Joe competed in a breaststroke double at the 2000 Summer Olympics in Sydney. He achieved FINA B-standards of 1:05.00 (100 m breaststroke) and 2:20.20 (200 m breaststroke) from the Dong-A Swimming Tournament in Ulsan. In the 100 m breaststroke, held on the first day of the Games, Joe challenged seven other swimmers in heat four, including two-time Olympians Valērijs Kalmikovs of Latvia and Arsenio López of Puerto Rico. He earned a fifth spot and forty-fifth overall by almost seven-tenths of a second (0.70) behind joint winners Kalmikovs and Lopez in 1:04.71, worthy enough for a personal best. Three days later, in the 200 m breaststroke, Joe placed twenty-ninth on the morning prelims. He set a new South Korean record of 2:19.16 to overhaul a 2:20 barrier and to touch the wall first in heat three.
