= Matthew Huang =

Canadian swimmer

Personal information
- Born: March 26, 1984 (age 42) Vancouver, Canada

Sport
- Sport: Swimming

Matthew Huang (born March 26, 1984) is a Canadian competitive swimmer.

At age 15, Huang qualified for the Canada national swimming team. In 2000, he qualified as a member of the Canadian Olympic swimming team to compete in Sydney, Australia. Huang would go on to represent Canada at many international swimming competitions but only re-emerged in 2005 as a national team member to attend the World Aquatics Championships in Montreal and the World Student Games in İzmir, Turkey.
