= Andrés Bicocca =

Argentine swimmer (born 1976)

Personal information
- Full name: Andrés Bicocca
- National team: Argentina
- Born: 14 January 1976 (age 50) San Martín, Buenos Aires, Argentina
- Height: 1.78 m (5 ft 10 in)
- Weight: 75 kg (165 lb)

Sport
- Sport: Swimming
- Strokes: Breaststroke
- Club: Club Deportivo Hispano Americano
- Coach: Gustavo Roldan

Andrés Bicocca (born January 14, 1976) is an Argentine former swimmer, who specialized in breaststroke events. He is a single-time Olympian (2000) and coach of Club Deportivo Hispano Americano in Río Gallegos, along head coach Alejandro Amuchástegui.

Bicocca competed only in the men's 200 m breaststroke at the 2000 Summer Olympics in Sydney. He achieved a FINA B-standard entry time of 2:22.06 from the Latin Cup in Serravalle, San Marino. He posted a lifetime best of 2:20.98 to maintain a lead from start to finish in heat one, against two other swimmers Nguyen Ngoc Anh of Vietnam and Leonard Ngoma of Zambia. Bicocca failed to advance into the semifinals, as he placed thirty-seventh overall in the prelims.
