= Zeng Qiliang =

Chinese swimmer (born 1975)

Personal information
- Full name: Zeng Qiliang
- Nationality: China
- Born: May 10, 1975 (age 51)
- Height: 1.74 m (5 ft 9 in)
- Weight: 72 kg (159 lb)

Sport
- Sport: Swimming
- Strokes: Breaststroke
Medal record
World Championships (LC)
Silver medal – second place	1998 Perth	100 m breaststroke
Asian Games
Gold medal – first place	1998 Bangkok	100 m breaststroke
Silver medal – second place	2002 Busan	100 m breaststroke

Zeng Qiliang (simplified Chinese: 曾启亮; traditional Chinese: 曾啟亮; pinyin: Céng Qǐliàng; born May 10, 1975) is a retired male breaststroke swimmer from PR China. He represented his native country at the 1996 Summer Olympics in Atlanta, Georgia. Zeng won the silver medal in the men's 100m breaststroke event at the 1998 World Aquatics Championships in Perth, Australia., which is the first medal of Chinese male swimmer in world championships.
