= Alexandr Savitskiy =

Kazakhstani swimmer

Personal information
- Born: March 20, 1971 (age 55) Temirtau, Soviet Union

Sport
- Sport: Swimming
Medal record
Representing Kazakhstan
Asian Games
Bronze medal – third place	1994 Hiroshima	4x100m medley relay
Bronze medal – third place	1998 Bangkok	4x100m medley relay

Aleksandr Savitsky (Russian: Александр Савицкий; born March 20, 1971) is a retired male medley and breaststroke swimmer from Kazakhstan. He competed in three consecutive Summer Olympics, starting in 1992 (Barcelona, Spain) for the Unified Team. His best Olympic result was finishing in 15th place at the 1996 Summer Olympics in the Men's 4 × 100 m Medley Relay event.
