= Chi Jia Han =

Hong Kong swimmer

Personal information
- Born: 30 June 1970 (age 56)

Sport
- Sport: Swimming

Chi Jia Han (born 30 June 1970) is a Hong Kong breaststroke swimmer. He competed in two events at the 1992 Summer Olympics.
