= Kurt Grote =

American swimmer (born 1973)

Personal information
- Full name: Kurt David Grote
- National team: United States
- Born: August 3, 1973 (age 52)
- Height: 6 ft 2 in (1.88 m)
- Weight: 181 lb (82 kg)

Sport
- Sport: Swimming
- Strokes: Breaststroke
- Club: North Coast Aquatics Swim Club; Santa Clara Swim Club
- College team: Stanford University
Medal record
Men's swimming
Representing the United States
Olympic Games
Gold medal – first place	1996 Atlanta	4×100 m medley
World Championships (LC)
Gold medal – first place	1998 Perth	200 m breaststroke
Silver medal – second place	1998 Perth	4×100 m medley
Bronze medal – third place	1998 Perth	100 m breaststroke
Pan Pacific Championships
Gold medal – first place	1997 Fukuoka	100 m breaststroke
Gold medal – first place	1997 Fukuoka	200 m breaststroke
Gold medal – first place	1997 Fukuoka	4×100 m medley
Bronze medal – third place	1995 Atlanta	100 m breaststroke

Kurt David Grote (born August 3, 1973) is an American former competition swimmer and Olympic gold medalist. Grote competed internationally in the breaststroke events during the 1990s.

Grote did not start swimming until the age of fifteen. He began swimming under the advice of a doctor to improve his asthma condition. He attended Stanford University, where he was a member of the Stanford Cardinal swimming and diving team. He also trained with and competed for the Santa Clara Swim Club. After his swimming career, he married a woman named Amy and completed his MD at Stanford. He has gone on to become a partner in McKinsey & Company's Healthcare Payor and Provider practice.

Grote competed in the 1996 Summer Olympics in Atlanta, Georgia. He finished sixth in the men's 100-meter breaststroke, eighth in the 200-meter breaststroke, and won a gold medal as a member of the winning U.S. team in the men's 4×100-meter medley relay.

== See also ==
- List of Olympic medalists in swimming (men)
- List of Stanford University people
- List of World Aquatics Championships medalists in swimming (men)
