= Regan Harrison =

Australian swimmer

Personal information
- Full name: Regan Dean Harrison
- National team: Australia
- Born: 25 November 1977 (age 48) Brisbane, Queensland
- Height: 1.78 m (5 ft 10 in)
- Weight: 71 kg (157 lb)

Sport
- Sport: Swimming
- Strokes: Breaststroke
- Club: Yeronga Park Swimming Club
Medal record
Men's swimming
Representing Australia
Olympic Games
Silver medal – second place	2000 Sydney	4×100 m medley
World Championships (LC)
Gold medal – first place	2001 Fukuoka	4×100 m medley
Pan Pacific Championships
Silver medal – second place	1999 Sydney	100 m breaststroke
Goodwill Games
Gold medal – first place	2001 Brisbane	4x100m medley
Bronze medal – third place	2001 Brisbane	200m breaststroke

Regan Dean Harrison (born 25 November 1977) is an Australian former breaststroke swimmer of the 1990s and 2000s, who won the silver medal at the 2000 Summer Olympics in Sydney as part of the 4×100-metre medley relay team. He was educated at the Anglican Church Grammar School.

Training at the Australian Institute of Sport, Harrison made his international debut at the 1999 Pan Pacific Swimming Championships in Sydney, where he won a silver medal in the 100-metre breaststroke and came fourth in the 200-metre breaststroke. The following year he finished second at the Australian Championships behind Ryan Mitchell, earning himself selection for the Sydney Olympics.

At the Olympics, he finished fourth in the 200 m breaststroke, just 0.15 of a second slower than the bronze medal winner. After Australia's only 100-metre breaststroker Phil Rogers put in a poor performance in the individual event, Australian head coach Don Talbot gambled on Harrison to replace Rogers, even though he was not originally selected in the 100-metre breaststroke. Harrison combined with Matt Welsh, Geoff Huegill and Michael Klim to claim silver, behind the United States who broke the world record.

At the 2001 Australian Championships, Harrison won gold and silver respectively in the 200-metre and 100-metre breaststroke to qualify for the 2001 World Aquatics Championships in Fukuoka, Japan. He came sixth and 20th in the 200-metre and 100-metre respectively, despite setting an Australian record in the 200-metre event. He combined with Welsh, Huegill and Ian Thorpe to win gold in the 4×100-metre medley relay. Harrison had a poor year in 2002, managing only seventh in the 200-metre breaststroke at the 2002 Commonwealth Games in Manchester, and being dropped for the 100-metre event and the medley relay. He won gold and silver in the 100-metre and 200-metre breaststroke at the 2003 Australian Championships, but continued to decline, finishing outside the top twenty in both events at the 2001 World Aquatics Championships in Barcelona, Spain. At the 2004 Summer Olympics, Harrison was eliminated in the heats of the 200-metre breaststroke. He retired after the Games. After retirement he began swimming recreationally with Ginninderra Marlins.

== See also ==
- List of Olympic medalists in swimming (men)
