= Andrew Rutherford (swimmer) =

Hong Kong swimmer

Personal information
- Born: 4 March 1972 (age 54)

Sport
- Sport: Swimming

Andrew Rutherford (born 4 March 1972) is a Hong Kong swimmer. He competed in three events at the 1992 Summer Olympics.
