= Yang Shang-hsuan =

Taiwanese swimmer

Personal information
- Full name: Yang Shang-hsuan
- National team: Chinese Taipei
- Born: 28 November 1983 (age 42) Taipei, Taiwan
- Height: 1.72 m (5 ft 8 in)
- Weight: 63 kg (139 lb)

Sport
- Sport: Swimming
- Strokes: Breaststroke

Yang Shang-hsuan (Chinese: 楊 尚軒; pinyin: Yáng Shàngxuān; born November 28, 1983) is a Taiwanese former swimmer, who specialized in breaststroke events. Yang competed only in the men's 100 m breaststroke, as a 16-year-old, at the 2000 Summer Olympics in Sydney. He achieved a FINA B-standard entry time of 1:04.16 from the National University Games in Taipei. He challenged seven other swimmers in heat five, including Israel's top favorite Tal Stricker. He raced to fourth place by more than half a second (0.50) behind winner Stricker in 1:04.54. Yang failed to advance into the semifinals, as he placed fortieth overall on the first day of prelims.
