= Nguyễn Ngọc Anh (swimmer) =

Vietnamese swimmer

Personal information
- Full name: Nguyễn Ngọc Anh
- National team: Vietnam
- Born: 1 November 2000 (age 25)
- Height: 1.67 m (5 ft 6 in)
- Weight: 53 kg (117 lb)

Sport
- Sport: Swimming
- Strokes: Breaststroke

Nguyễn Ngọc Anh (born October 26, 1981) is a Vietnamese former swimmer, who specialized in breaststroke events. Nguyen qualified only for the men's 200 m breaststroke at the 2000 Summer Olympics in Sydney, by receiving a Universality place from FINA, in an entry time of 2:23.75. He participated in heat one against two other swimmers Andrés Bicocca of Argentina and Leonard Ngoma of Zambia. He raced to a second seed by more than a full body length behind winner Bicocca in 2:29.54. Nguyen failed to advance into the semifinals, as he placed forty-fifth overall in the prelims.
