= Matthew Kwok =

Hong Kong swimmer (born 1979)

Personal information
- Full name: Matthew Kwok Hon-ming
- National team: Hong Kong
- Born: 18 April 1979 (age 47) Laguna Hills, California, U.S.
- Height: 1.80 m (5 ft 11 in)
- Weight: 72 kg (159 lb)

Sport
- Sport: Swimming
- Strokes: Breaststroke
- College team: University of Hawaiʻi (U.S.)
- Coach: Sam Freas (U.S.)

Matthew Kwok Hon-ming (also Kwok Hon-ming, Chinese: 郭漢明; pinyin: Guō Hànmíng; Jyutping: gwok^{3} hon^{3} ming^{4}; born April 18, 1979) is a Hong Kong former swimmer, who specialized in breaststroke events. He is a single-time Olympian (2000), and a member of the University of Hawaiʻi swimming and diving team under head coach Sam Freas. He also holds numerous Hong Kong records in the 100 m breaststroke, and retains a dual resident status to compete internationally for his father's homeland. Kwok is also a younger brother of Olympic swimmer and Asian Games bronze medalist Mark Kwok.

Kwok competed only in the men's 100 m breaststroke at the 2000 Summer Olympics in Sydney. He posted a FINA B-standard entry time of 1:05.29 from the Hong Kong Long Course Championships. He challenged seven other swimmers in heat three, including Namibia's three-time Olympian Jorg Lindemeier. He posted a lifetime best of 1:05.28 to pick up a fifth seed by three hundredths of a second (0.03) behind Lindemeier. Kwok failed to advance into the semifinals, as he placed fiftieth overall on the first day of prelims.
