= Phil Rogers =

Australian swimmer (born 1971)

Personal information
- Full name: Philip John Rogers
- Nickname: "Phil"
- National team: Australia
- Born: 24 April 1971 (age 55) Adelaide, South Australia
- Height: 1.83 m (6 ft 0 in)
- Weight: 81 kg (179 lb)

Sport
- Sport: Swimming
- Strokes: Breaststroke
Medal record
Men's swimming
Representing Australia
Olympic Games
Bronze medal – third place	1992 Barcelona	100 m breaststroke
Bronze medal – third place	1996 Atlanta	4×100 m medley
World Championships (LC)
Gold medal – first place	1998 Perth	4×100 m medley
World Championships (SC)
Gold medal – first place	1993 Palma	100 m breaststroke
Gold medal – first place	1997 Gothenburg	4×100 m medley
Gold medal – first place	1999 Hong Kong	200 m breaststroke
Gold medal – first place	1999 Hong Kong	4×100 m medley
Silver medal – second place	1993 Palma	200 m breaststroke
Pan Pacific Championships
Gold medal – first place	1993 Kobe	100 m breaststroke
Gold medal – first place	1993 Kobe	200 m breaststroke
Silver medal – second place	1991 Edmonton	100 m breaststroke
Silver medal – second place	1993 Kobe	4×100 m medley
Silver medal – second place	1995 Atlanta	100 m breaststroke
Silver medal – second place	1995 Atlanta	4×100 m medley
Silver medal – second place	1997 Fukuoka	100 m breaststroke
Silver medal – second place	1997 Fukuoka	4×100 m medley
Bronze medal – third place	1995 Atlanta	200 m breaststroke
Bronze medal – third place	1991 Edmonton	4×100 m medley
Commonwealth Games
Gold medal – first place	1994 Victoria	100 m breaststroke
Gold medal – first place	1994 Victoria	4×100 m medley
Silver medal – second place	1994 Victoria	200 m breaststroke
Silver medal – second place	1998 Kuala Lumpur	100 m breaststroke
Bronze medal – third place	1990 Auckland	4×100 m medley

Philip John Rogers (born 24 April 1971) is a former breaststroke swimmer who competed in three consecutive Summer Olympics for Australia, starting in 1992. He was an Australian Institute of Sport scholarship holder.

At his Olympic debut he won the bronze medal in the 100-metre breaststroke, followed by a bronze in 1996 in the 4x100-metre medley relay. During his last Olympic appearance, at the 2000 Summer Olympics in Sydney, he was the oldest member of the Australian Swimming team, at age 29.

== See also ==
- List of Commonwealth Games medallists in swimming (men)
- List of Olympic medalists in swimming (men)
- World record progression 100 metres breaststroke
- World record progression 200 metres breaststroke
