= Zhu Yi (swimmer) =

Chinese swimmer (born 1977)

Personal information
- Born: September 14, 1977 (age 48)

Sport
- Sport: Swimming
Medal record
Representing China
World Championships (SC)
Silver medal – second place	2000 Athens	100m breaststroke
Asian Games
Gold medal – first place	1998 Bangkok	200m breaststroke

Zhu Yi (born 14 September 1977) is a Chinese former swimmer who competed in the 2000 Summer Olympics.
