= Jarrod Marrs =

American competition swimmer (born 1975)

Personal information
- Full name: Jarrod Thomas Marrs
- National team: United States
- Born: May 28, 1975 (age 51) Baton Rouge, Louisiana
- Website: www.fitnessbyjarrod.com

Sport
- Sport: Swimming
- Strokes: Breaststroke
- Club: Curl-Burke Swim Club
- College team: Louisiana State University
Medal record
Men's swimming
Representing the United States
World Championships (SC)
Gold medal – first place	2000 Athens	4×100 m medley
Pan Pacific Championships
Bronze medal – third place	1997 Fukuoka	100 m breaststroke
Pan American Games
Silver medal – second place	1999 Winnipeg	100 m breaststroke
Silver medal – second place	2003 S.Domingo	100 m breaststroke

Jarrod Thomas Marrs (born May 28, 1975) is an American competition swimmer who specialized in breaststroke events. He twice competed at the Pan American Games (1999 and 2003), winning a silver medal in the men's 100-meter breaststroke in both, and won a gold medal at the 2000 FINA Short Course World Championships as a member of the first-place U.S. team in the 4x100-meter medley relay. While he was a college student at Louisiana State University (LSU), he competed for the LSU Tigers swimming and diving team.

He also served as an assistant swimming coach for the University of Houston.
