= Yoshinobu Miyazaki =

Japanese swimmer (born 1978)

Personal information
- Full name: 宮崎 義伸
- Nationality: Japanese
- Born: June 9, 1978 (age 48) Fukuoka
- Height: 1.78 m (5 ft 10 in)
- Weight: 70 kg (150 lb)

Sport
- Sport: Swimming
- Strokes: Breaststroke
- Club: KSG Tokiwa
Medal record
Men's swimming
Asian Games
Bronze medal – third place	1998 Bangkok	200 m breaststroke

Yoshinobu Miyazaki (宮崎 義伸, Miyazaki Yoshinobu; born June 9, 1978 in Fukuoka, Japan) is a retired Japanese male breaststroke swimmer. He represented Japan at the 1996 Summer Olympics in Atlanta, Georgia. His son, Iori Miyazaki is also a swimmer.
