= Tam Chi-kin =

Hong Kong swimmer (born 1980)

Personal information
- Full name: Daniel Tam Chi-kin
- National team: Hong Kong
- Born: 28 July 1980 (age 45) Hong Kong, Hong Kong
- Height: 1.73 m (5 ft 8 in)
- Weight: 72 kg (159 lb)

Sport
- Sport: Swimming
- Strokes: Breaststroke
- Club: SLA Sports Club
- Coach: Anthony Giorgi (AUS)

Daniel Tam Chi-kin (also Tam Chi-kin, Chinese: 譚智健; pinyin: Tán Zhìjiàn; Jyutping: taam^{4} zi^{3}gin^{6}; born July 28, 1980) is a Hong Kong former swimmer, who specialized in breaststroke events. He is a two-time Olympian (2000 and 2004), and a double finalist in the 100 and 200 m breaststroke at the 2002 Asian Games in Busan, South Korea. Tam is a member of the swimming team for SLA Sports Club, and is trained by an Australian-born coach Anthony Giorgi.

Tam made his first Hong Kong squad at the 2000 Summer Olympics in Sydney, where he competed in the 200 m breaststroke. Swimming in heat three, he edged out Costa Rica's Juan José Madrigal to take a seventh spot and forty-second overall by 0.45 of a second in 2:24.04.

At the 2004 Summer Olympics in Athens, Tam extended his program, competing both in the 100 and 200 breaststroke as Hong Kong's only male swimmer. He posted FINA B-standard entry times of 1:04.35 (100 m breaststroke) and 2:18.10 (200 m breaststroke) from the Olympic trials in Auckland. On the first day of the Games, Tam raced to a strong time of 1:05.11 to lead the second heat of the 100 m breaststroke, but came up short with a forty-fourth-place effort from the morning preliminaries. In his second event, 200 m breaststroke, Tam challenged seven other swimmers in heat two, including dual citizen Mihail Alexandrov of Bulgaria. He rounded out the field to last place by 0.23 of a second behind New Zealand's Ben Labowitch in 2:19.48. Tam failed to advance into the semifinals, as he placed forty-second overall in the preliminaries.
