= Simon Cowley =

Australian swimmer

Personal information
- Full name: Simon Cowley
- Nationality: Australian
- Born: 4 October 1980 (age 45) Australia, NSW

Sport
- Sport: Swimming
- Strokes: Breaststroke
Medal record
Men's swimming
Representing Australia
Pan Pacific Championships
Gold medal – first place	1999 Sydney	100 m breaststroke
Gold medal – first place	1999 Sydney	200 m breaststroke
Commonwealth Games
Gold medal – first place	1998 Kuala Lumpur	100 m breaststroke
Gold medal – first place	1998 Kuala Lumpur	200 m breaststroke
Gold medal – first place	1998 Kuala Lumpur	4×100 m medley relay

Simon Cowley (born 4 October 1980) is a former Australian breaststroke swimmer. In March 2008, he was assaulted by Nick D'Arcy at a pub in Sydney.

== See also ==
- List of Commonwealth Games medallists in swimming (men)
