= France at the 1988 Summer Olympics =

- IOC code: FRA
- NOC: French National Olympic and Sports Committee

in Seoul
- Competitors: 266 (192 men and 74 women) in 23 sports
- Flag bearer: Philippe Riboud
- Medals Ranked 9th: Gold 6 Silver 4 Bronze 6 Total 16

Summer Olympics appearances (overview)
- 1896; 1900; ~~1904~~; 1908; 1912; 1920; 1924; 1928; 1932; 1936; 1948; 1952; 1956; 1960; 1964; 1968; 1972; 1976; 1980; 1984; 1988; 1992; 1996; 2000; 2004; 2008; 2012; 2016; 2020; 2024; 2028

Other related appearances
- 1906 Intercalated Games

France competed at the 1988 Summer Olympics in Seoul, South Korea. 266 competitors, 192 men and 74 women, took part in 167 events in 23 sports.

== Medalists ==
Medal	Name	Sport	Event	Date
Gold	Jean-François Lamour	Fencing	Men's sabre	23 September
Gold	Thierry Péponnet; Luc Pillot	Sailing	Men's 470	27 September
Gold	Nicolas Hénard; Jean-Yves Le Déroff	Sailing	Tornado	27 September
Gold	Marc Alexandre	Judo	Men's 71 kg	27 September
Gold	Frédéric Delpla; Jean-Michel Henry; Olivier Lenglet; Philippe Riboud; Éric Srecki	Fencing	Men's team épée	30 September
Gold	Pierre Durand	Equestrian	Individual jumping	2 October
Silver	Nicolas Berthelot	Shooting	Men's 10 metre air rifle	20 September
Silver	Philippe Riboud	Fencing	Men's épée	24 September
Silver	Margit Otto-Crépin	Equestrian	Individual dressage	27 September
Silver	Laurent Boudouani	Boxing	Welterweight	1 October
Bronze	Catherine Plewinski	Swimming	Women's 100 metre freestyle	19 September
Bronze	Stéphan Caron	Swimming	Men's 100 metre freestyle	22 September
Bronze	Bruno Carabetta	Judo	Men's 65 kg	26 September
Bronze	Hubert Bourdy; Frédéric Cottier; Pierre Durand; Michel Robert	Equestrian	Team jumping	28 September
Bronze	Joël Bettin; Philippe Renaud	Canoeing	Men's C-2 500 metres	30 September
Bronze	Bruno Marie-Rose; Max Morinière; Gilles Quénéhervé; Daniel Sangouma	Athletics	Men's 4 × 100 metres relay	1 October

== Competitors ==
The following is the list of number of competitors in the Games.

Sport	Men	Women	Total
Archery	3	3	6
Athletics	33	22	55
Boxing	4	–	4
Canoeing	12	4	16
Cycling	12	4	16
Diving	2	0	2
Equestrian	9	3	12
Fencing	14	5	19
Gymnastics	6	4	10
Judo	7	–	7
Modern pentathlon	3	–	3
Rowing	7	5	12
Sailing	11	2	13
Shooting	12	7	19
Swimming	16	9	25
Synchronized swimming	–	3	3
Table tennis	2	0	2
Tennis	2	3	5
Volleyball	12	0	12
Water polo	13	–	13
Weightlifting	4	–	4
Wrestling	9	–	9
Total	192	74	266

== Archery ==
In France's fourth appearance in modern Olympic archery, no individual archer made it past the quarterfinal. The women's team made it to the final, placing last there to finish 8th overall, while the men's team was eliminated in the semifinal.

Women's Individual Competition:

- Catherine Pellen — quarterfinal, 14th place
- Nathalie Hibon — preliminary round, 28th place
- Marie-Josée Bazin — preliminary round, 47th place

Men's Individual Competition:

- Olivier Heck — 1/8 final, 19th place
- Thierry Venant — preliminary round, 37th place
- Claude Franclet — preliminary round, 64th place

Women's Team Competition:

- Pellen, Hibon, and Bazin — final, 8th place

Men's Team Competition:

- Heck, Venant, and Franclet — semifinal, 10th place

== Athletics ==
Men's 10.000 metres

- Jean-Louis Prianon
  - First Round — 28:08.38
  - Final — 27:36.43 (→ 4th place)
- Paul Arpin
  - First Round — 28:25.56
  - Final — 27:39.36 (→ 7th place)

Men's 3.000m Steeplechase

- Raymond Pannier
  - Heat — 8:30.94
  - Semi Final — 8:19.39
  - Final — 8:23.80 (→ 12th place)
- Bruno Le Stum
  - Heat — 8:36.95
  - Semi Final — 8:26.69 (→ did not advance)

Men's Javelin Throw

- Charlus Bertimon
  - Qualification — 70.84m (→ did not advance)
- Stéphane Laporte
  - Qualification — 69.40m (→ did not advance)
- Pascal Lefèvre
  - Qualification — 76.42m (→ did not advance)

Men's Discus Throw

- Patrick Journoud
  - Qualifying Heat — 58.94m (→ did not advance)

Men's Long Jump

- Norbert Brige
  - Qualification — 8.05m
  - Final — 7.97m (→ 7th place)

Men's Decathlon

- Christian Plaziat — 8272 points (→ 5th place)

1. 100 metres — 10.83s
2. Long Jump — 7.62m
3. Shot Put — 13.58m
4. High Jump — 2.12m
5. 400 metres — 48.34s
6. 110m Hurdles — 14.18s
7. Discus Throw — 43.06m
8. Pole Vault — 4.90m
9. Javelin Throw — 52.18m
10. 1.500 metres — 4:34.07s

- Alain Blondel — 8268 points (→ 6th place)

1. 100 metres — 11.02s
2. Long Jump — 7.43m
3. Shot Put — 12.92m
4. High Jump — 1.97m
5. 400 metres — 47.44s
6. 110m Hurdles — 14.40s
7. Discus Throw — 41.20m
8. Pole Vault — 5.20m
9. Javelin Throw — 57.46m
10. 1.500 metres — 4:16.64s

Men's 20 km Walk

- Martial Fesselier
  - Final — 1:22:43 (→ 16th place)
- Thierry Toutain
  - Final — 1:22:55 (→ 18th place)

Men's 50 km Walk

- Alain Lemercier
  - Final — 3'50:28 (→ 16th place)
- Jean-Marie Neff
  - Final — DSQ (→ no ranking)
- Eric Neisse
  - Final — DSQ (→ no ranking)

Women's 4 × 400 m Relay

- Fabienne Ficher, Nathalie Simon, Evecyne Elien, and Nadine Debois
  - Heat — 3:29.95
- Fabienne Ficher, Simon Fabienne, Debois Nathalie, and Elien Nadine
  - Final — 3:29.37 (→ 7th place)

Women's Marathon

- Françoise Bonnet
  - Final — 2"32:36 (→ 14th place)
- Maria Rebelo-Lelut
  - Final — 2"33:47 (→ 18th place)
- Jocelyne Villeton
  - Final — 2"34:02 (→ 19th place)

Women's Javelin Throw

- Nadine Auzeil
  - Qualification — no mark (→ did not advance)

Women's Heptathlon

- Chantal Beaugeant
  - Final Result — 2315 points (→ 28th place)

== Boxing ==
Men's Flyweight (— 51 kg)

- Philippe Desavoye
  - First Round — Bye
  - Second Round — Defeated Anthony Ikegu (KEN), RSC-2
  - Third Round — Lost to Melvin de Leon (DOM), 0:5

Men's Bantamweight (— 54 kg)

- Jean-Marc Augustin
  - First Round — Lost to Byun Jong-Il (KOR), 0:5

Men's Light Welterweight (— 63.5 kg)

- Ludovic Proto
  - First Round — Defeated Mpuco Makama (SUA), walk-over
  - Second Round — Defeated Mark Elliott (GBR), RSC-1
  - Third Round — Lost to Vyacheslav Yanovski (URS), 0:5

Men's Welterweight (— 67 kg)

- Laurent Boudouani → Silver Medal
  - First Round — Bye
  - Second Round — Defeated Imre Bácskai (HUN), 4:1
  - Third Round — Defeated Darren Obah (AUS), 5:0
  - Quarterfinals — Defeated Song Kyung-Sup (KOR), 3:2
  - Semifinals — Defeated Kenneth Gould (USA), 4:1
  - Final — Lost to Robert Wangila (KEN), KO-2

== Canoeing ==
Men's K-4 1,000 metres

- Christophe Petibout (9th place)

== Cycling ==
Sixteen cyclists, twelve men and four women, represented France in 1988.

Men's road race

- Jean-François Laffillé
- Claude Carlin
- Laurent Bezault

Men's team time trial

- Laurent Bezault
- Eric Heulot
- Pascal Lance
- Thierry Laurent

Men's sprint

- Fabrice Colas

Men's 1 km time trial

- Frédéric Magné

Men's team pursuit

- Hervé Dagorné
- Pascal Lino
- Didier Pasgrimaud
- Pascal Potié

Men's points race

- Pascal Lino

Women's road race

- Catherine Marsal
- Jeannie Longo-Ciprelli
- Cécile Odin

Women's sprint

- Isabelle Gautheron

== Diving ==
Men

Athlete	Event	Preliminary		Final	
Athlete	Event	Points	Rank	Points	Rank
Jérôme Nalliod	3 m springboard	496.17	24	Did not advance	
Frédéric Pierre	10 m platform	437.01	23	Did not advance	

== Fencing ==
19 fencers, 14 men and 5 women, represented France in 1988.

Men's foil

- Philippe Omnès
- Laurent Bel
- Patrick Groc

Men's team foil

- Laurent Bel, Patrick Groc, Youssef Hocine, Patrice Lhotellier, Philippe Omnès

Men's épée

- Philippe Riboud
- Éric Srecki
- Jean-Michel Henry

Men's team épée

- Frédéric Delpla, Jean-Michel Henry, Olivier Lenglet, Philippe Riboud, Éric Srecki

Men's sabre

- Jean-François Lamour
- Philippe Delrieu
- Pierre Guichot

Men's team sabre

- Philippe Delrieu, Franck Ducheix, Pierre Guichot, Jean-François Lamour

Women's foil

- Isabelle Spennato
- Brigitte Latrille-Gaudin
- Laurence Modaine-Cessac

Women's team foil

- Brigitte Latrille-Gaudin, Gisèle Meygret, Laurence Modaine-Cessac, Nathalie Pallet, Isabelle Spennato

== Modern pentathlon ==
Three male pentathletes represented France in 1988.

Men's Individual Competition:

- Christophe Ruer — 5242 pts (→ 5th place)
- Joël Bouzou — 5198 pts (→ 8th place)
- Bruno Génard — 4828 pts (→ 37th place)

Men's Team Competition:

- Ruer, Bouzou, and Genard — 15268 pts (→ 4th place)

== Swimming ==
Men's 50 m Freestyle

- Stéphan Caron
  - Heat — 23.22
  - B-Final — scratched (→ no ranking)
- Christophe Kalfayan
  - Heat — 23.47
  - B-Final — 23.15 (→ 13th place)

Men's 100 m Freestyle

- Stéphan Caron
  - Heat — 49.37
  - Final — 49.62 (→ Bronze Medal)
- Christophe Kalfayan
  - Heat — 51.05 (→ did not advance, 20th place)

Men's 200 m Freestyle

- Stéphan Caron
  - Heat — 1:49.66
  - B-Final — scratched (→ no ranking)
- Ludovic Depickère
  - Heat — 1:53.81 (→ did not advance, 35th place)

Men's 400 m Freestyle

- Franck Iacono
  - Heat — 4:00.04 (→ did not advance, 30th place)

Men's 1500 m Freestyle

- Christophe Marchand
  - Heat — 15:22.19 (→ did not advance, 12th place)
- Franck Iacono
  - Heat — 15:22.66 (→ did not advance, 13th place)

Men's 100 m Backstroke

- Franck Schott
  - Heat — 56.76
  - B-Final — 56.98 (→ 10th place)
- Renaud Boucher
  - Heat — 58.90 (→ did not advance, 31st place)

Men's 200 m Backstroke

- David Holderbach
  - Heat — 2:04.83 (→ did not advance, 21st place)

Men's 100 m Breaststroke

- David Leblanc
  - Heat — 1:04.56 (→ did not advance, 22nd place)
- Cédric Penicaud
  - Heat — 1:05.46 (→ did not advance, 36th place)

Men's 200 m Breaststroke

- Cédric Penicaud
  - Heat — 2:18.72
  - B-Final — 2:18.95 (→ 16th place)
- David Leblanc
  - Heat — DSQ (→ did not advance, no ranking)

Men's 100 m Butterfly

- Ludovic Depickère
  - Heat — 56.47 (→ did not advance, 27th place)

Men's 200 m Butterfly

- Christophe Bordeau
  - Heat — 2:01.70
  - B-Final — 2:01.46 (→ 13th place)

Men's 200 m Individual Medley

- Christophe Bordeau
  - Heat — 2:04.95
  - B-Final — 2:05.51 (→ 12th place)

Men's 400 m Individual Medley

- Christophe Bordeau
  - Heat — 4:23.46
  - B-Final — 4:23.39 (→ 10th place)
- Laurent Journet
  - Heat — 4:29.03 (→ did not advance, 18th place)

Men's 4 × 100 m Freestyle Relay

- Stéphan Caron, Christophe Kalfayan, Laurent Neuville, and Bruno Gutzeit
  - Heat — 3:21.77
  - Final — 3:20.02 (→ 4th place)

Men's 4 × 200 m Freestyle Relay

- Stéphan Caron, Michel Pou, Olivier Fougeroud, and Laurent Neuville
  - Heat — 7:23.03
- Michel Pou, Franck Iacono, Olivier Fougeroud, and Ludovic Depickère
  - Final — 7:24.69 (→ 7th place)

Men's 4 × 100 m Medley Relay

- Franck Schott, David Leblanc, Ludovic Depickère, and Bruno Gutzeit
  - Heat — 3:48.64 (→ did not advance, 10th place)

Women's 50 m Freestyle

- Catherine Plewinski
  - Heat — 26.01
  - Final — 25.90 (→ 7th place)

Women's 100 m Freestyle

- Catherine Plewinski
  - Heat — 55.53
  - Final — 55.49 (→ Bronze Medal)
- Jacqueline Délord
  - Heat — 58.22 (→ did not advance, 29th place)

Women's 200 m Freestyle

- Cécile Prunier
  - Heat — 2:01.60
  - Final — 2:02.88 (→ 8th place)

Women's 400 m Freestyle

- Cécile Prunier
  - Heat — 4:15.63
  - B-Final — 4:21.03 (→ 16th place)

Women's 800 m Freestyle

- Karyn Faure
  - Heat — 8:41.64 (→ did not advance, 13th place)
- Cécile Prunier
  - Heat — 8:57.22 (→ did not advance, 24th place)

Women's 100 m Backstroke

- Laurence Guillou
  - Heat — 1:05.07 (→ did not advance, 20th place)

Women's 200 m Backstroke

- Christine Magnier
  - Heat — 2:24.15 (→ did not advance, 25th place)

Women's 100 m Breaststroke

- Pascaline Louvrier
  - Heat — 1:13.21 (→ did not advance, 24th place)
- Virginie Bojaryn
  - Heat — 1:13.55 (→ did not advance, 26th place)

Women's 200 m Breaststroke

- Virginie Bojaryn
  - Heat — 2:37.38 (→ did not advance, 22nd place)
- Pascaline Louvrier
  - Heat — 2:38.75 (→ did not advance, 26th place)

Women's 100 m Butterfly

- Catherine Plewinski
  - Heat — 59.34
  - Final — 59.58 (→ 4th place)
- Jacqueline Délord
  - Heat — 1:02.24
  - B-Final — 1:02.45 (→ 11th place)

Women's 200 m Butterfly

- Claire Supiot
  - Heat — 2:21.65 (→ did not advance, 25th place)

Women's 400 m Individual Medley

- Christine Magnier
  - Heat — 4:51.91
  - Final — 4:53.29 (→ 14th place)

Women's 4 × 100 m Medley Relay

- Laurence Guillou, Pascaline Louvrier, Catherine Plewinski, and Jacqueline Délord
  - Heat — 4:16.21 (→ did not advance, 10th place)

== Synchronized swimming ==
Three synchronized swimmers represented France in 1988.

Women's solo

- Muriel Hermine
- Anne Capron
- Karine Schuler

Women's duet

- Anne Capron
- Karine Schuler

== Tennis ==
Women's Singles Competition

- Catherine Suire
  - First Round — Defeated Yayuk Basuki (Indonesia) 6-3, 3-6, 6-0
  - Second Round — Defeated Jeong-Myung Lee (South Korea) 7-5, 4-6, 7-5
  - Third Round — Lost to Steffi Graf (West Germany) 3-6, 0-6
- Isabelle Demongeot
  - First Round — Lost to Jana Novotná (Czechoslovakia) 4-6, 3-6
- Nathalie Tauziat
  - First Round — Defeated Carling Bassett-Seguso (Canada) 7-6, 6-1
  - Second Round — Lost to Catarina Lindqvist (Sweden) 6-2, 3-6, 4-6

== Volleyball ==
=== Men's team competition ===
- Preliminary round (group B)
  - Defeated the Netherlands (3-1)
  - Defeated Tunisia (3-0)
  - Defeated Japan (3-1)
  - Lost to United States (0-3)
  - Defeated Argentina (3-0)
- Classification Matches
  - 5th/8th place: Lost to Bulgaria (0-3)
  - 7th/8th place: Lost to Sweden (2-3) → 8th place
- Team roster
  - Philippe Blain
  - Jean-Baptiste Martzluff
  - Herve Mazzon
  - Eric N'Gapeth
  - Eric Bouvier
  - Christophe Meneau
  - Jean-Marc Jurkovitz
  - Laurent Tillie
  - Olivier Rossard
  - Patrick Duflos
  - Alain Fabiani
  - Philippe Salvan
- Head coach: Eric Daniel

== Water polo ==
Men's Team Competition

- Preliminary round (group A)
  - Defeated South Korea (16-5)
  - Lost to West Germany (9-10)
  - Lost to Soviet Union (4-18)
  - Lost to Australia (6-7)
  - Lost to Italy (8-14)
- Classification Round (Group E)
  - Defeated China (11-4)
  - Lost to Greece (7-10) → Tenth place
- Team roster
  - Arnaud Bouet
  - Marc Brisfer
  - Marc Crousillat
  - Pierre Garsau
  - Bruno Boyadjian
  - Philippe Herve
  - Michel Idoux
  - Thierry Alimondo
  - Michel Crousillat
  - Nicolas Marischael
  - Nicolas Jeleff
  - Pascal Perot
  - Christian Volpi
- Head coach: Jean Paul Clemencon

== Weightlifting ==
First-heavyweight 90–100 kg

- Francis Tournefier — 5th place, 385.0 kg (170.0 kg/ 215.0 kg)
