= Water polo at the 1988 Summer Olympics – Men's team squads =

The following are complete squad rosters of all participating teams who competed at the men's water polo tournament at the 1988 Summer Olympics in Seoul.

== Group A ==
=== Australia ===
The following players represented Australia:

Glenn Townsend, Richard Pengelley, Christopher Harrison, Troy Stockwell, Andrew Wightman, Andrew Kerr, Raymond Mayers, Geoffrey Clark, John Fox, Christopher Wybrow, Simon Asher, Andrew Taylor and Donald Cameron. Head Coach: Tom Hoad.

=== France ===
The following players represented France:

Arnaud Bouet, Marc Brisfer, Marc Crousillat, Pierre Garsau, Bruno Boyadjian, Philippe Hervé, Michel Idoux, Thierry Alimondo, Michel Crousillat, Nicolas Marischael, Nicolas Jeleff, Pascal Perot and Christian Volpi. Head Coach: Jean Paul Clemencon.

=== Italy ===
The following players represented Italy:

Paolo Trapanese, Alfio Misaggi, Andrea Pisano, Antonello Steardo, Alessandro Campagna, Paolo Caldarella, Mario Fiorillo, Francesco Porzio, Stefano Postiglione, Riccardo Tempestini, Massimiliano Ferretti, Marco D'Altrui and Gianni Averaimo. Head Coach: Fritz Dennerlein.

=== South Korea ===
The following players represented South Korea:

Lee Jeong-seok, Jang Si-yeong, Kim Seong-eun, Yu Seung-hun, Kim Gi-chun, Kim Jae-yeon, Choi Seon-yong, Kim Gil-hwan, Kim Jin-tae, Song Seung-ho, Hong Sun-bo, Lee Taeg-won and Park Sang-won. Head Coach: Jong-Ku Kim.

=== Soviet Union ===
The following players represented the Soviet Union:

Yevgeny Sharonov, Nurlan Mendygaliev, Yevgeny Grishin, Aleksandr Kolotov, Sergey Naumov, Viktor Berendyuga, Sergey Kotenko, Dmitry Apanasenko, Georgi Mschvenieradze, Mikhail Ivanov, Sergey Markoch, Nikolai Smirnov and Mikheil Giorgadze. Head Coach: Boris Popov.

=== West Germany ===
The following players represented West Germany:

Peter Röhle, Dirk Jacoby, Frank Otto, Uwe Sterzik, Armando Fernández, Andreas Ehrl, Ingo Borgmann, Rainer Osselmann, Hagen Stamm, Thomas Huber, Dirk Theismann, René Reimann and Werner Obschernikat. Head Coach: Nicola Firuio.

== Group B ==
=== China ===
The following players represented China:

Ni Shiwei, Wang Minhui, Yang Yong, Yu Xiang, Huang Long, Huang Qijiang, Cui Shiping, Zhao Bilong, Li Jianxiong, Cai Shengliu, Wen Fan, Ge Jianqing and Zheng Qing. Head Coach: Peng Shaorong.

=== Greece ===
The following players represented Greece:

Nikolaos Christoforidis, Philippos Kaiafas, Epaminondas Samartzidis, Anastassios Tsikaris, Kyriakos Giannopoulos, Aris Kefalogiannis, Nikolaos Venetopoulos, Dimitrios Seletopoulos, Antonios Aronis, Evangelos Pateros, Georgios Mavrotas and Evangelos Patras. Head Coach: Koulis Iosifidis

=== Hungary ===
The following players represented Hungary:

Péter Kuna, Gábor Bujka, Gábor Schmiedt, Zsolt Petőváry, István Pintér, Tibor Keszthelyi, Balázs Vincze, Zoltán Mohi, Tibor Pardi, László Tóth, András Gyöngyösi, Zoltán Kósz and Imre Tóth. Head Coach: Zoltan Kasas

=== Spain ===
The following players represented Spain:

Jesús Rollán, Miguel Chillida, Marco Antonio González, Miguel Pérez, Manuel Estiarte, Pere Robert, Jorge Payá, José Rodriguez, Jorge Sans, Salvador Gómez, Mariano Moya, Jorge Neira and Pedro Garcia. Head Coach: Antonio Esteller.

=== United States ===
The following players represented the United States:

Craig Wilson, Kevin Robertson, James Bergeson, Peter Campbell, Douglas Kimbell, Edward Klass, Alan Mouchawar, Jeffrey Campbell, Greg Boyer, Terry Schroeder, Jody Campbell, Christopher Duplanty and Michael Evans. Head Coach: Bill Barnett.

=== Yugoslavia ===
The following players represented Yugoslavia:

Head coach: (Socialist Federal Republic of Yugoslavia) Ratko Rudić

№	Name	Pld	Gls	Height	Weight	Date of birth	1988 club
1	Aleksandar Šoštar			1.96 m (6 ft 5 in)	102 kg (225 lb)	21 January 1964	(Socialist Federal Republic of Yugoslavia) Partizan
2	Deni Lušić			1.90 m (6 ft 3 in)	95 kg (209 lb)	14 April 1962	(Socialist Federal Republic of Yugoslavia) POŠK
3	Dubravko Šimenc			2.01 m (6 ft 7 in)	115 kg (254 lb)	2 November 1966	(Socialist Federal Republic of Yugoslavia) Mladost
4	Perica Bukić			1.98 m (6 ft 6 in)	85 kg (187 lb)	20 February 1966	(Socialist Federal Republic of Yugoslavia) Šibenik
5	Veselin Đuho			1.87 m (6 ft 2 in)	95 kg (209 lb)	5 January 1960	(Socialist Federal Republic of Yugoslavia) Jug
6	Dragan Andrić			1.92 m (6 ft 4 in)	91 kg (201 lb)	6 June 1962	(Socialist Federal Republic of Yugoslavia) Partizan
7	Mirko Vičević			1.92 m (6 ft 4 in)	82 kg (181 lb)	30 June 1968	(Socialist Federal Republic of Yugoslavia) Primorac
8	Igor Gočanin			1.90 m (6 ft 3 in)	82 kg (181 lb)	24 July 1966	(Socialist Federal Republic of Yugoslavia) Partizan
9	Mislav Bezmalinović			1.97 m (6 ft 6 in)	88 kg (194 lb)	11 May 1967	(Socialist Federal Republic of Yugoslavia) Jadran
10	Tomislav Paškvalin			2.04 m (6 ft 8 in)	105 kg (231 lb)	29 August 1961	(Socialist Federal Republic of Yugoslavia) Mladost
11	Igor Milanović			1.95 m (6 ft 5 in)	97 kg (214 lb)	18 December 1965	(Socialist Federal Republic of Yugoslavia) Partizan
12	Goran Rađenović			1.97 m (6 ft 6 in)	95 kg (209 lb)	4 November 1966	(Socialist Federal Republic of Yugoslavia) Partizan
13	Renco Posinković			1.97 m (6 ft 6 in)	91 kg (201 lb)	4 January 1964	(Socialist Federal Republic of Yugoslavia) Mornar
