= Swimming at the 1987 Mediterranean Games =

- Location: Latakia, Syria

The swimming competition at the 1987 Mediterranean Games was held in Latakia, Syria.

== Medallists ==
=== Men's events ===
| Event | Gold | | Silver | | Bronze | |
|---|---|---|---|---|---|---|
| 100 m freestyle | Giorgio Lamberti (ITA) | 50.68 | Laurent Neuville (FRA) | 51.70 | Fabrizio Rampazzo (ITA) | 52.68 |
| 200 m freestyle | Giorgio Lamberti (ITA) | 1:49.27 | Massimo Trevisan (ITA) | 1:53.71 | Daniel Serra (ESP) | 1:54.79 |
| 400 m freestyle | Giorgio Lamberti (ITA) | 3:56.13 | Massimo Trevisan (ITA) | 3:58.35 | Nace Majcen (YUG) | 4:01.28 |
| 1500 m freestyle | Luca Pellegrini (ITA) | 15:28.26 | Javier Torrallardona (ESP) | 16:01.75 | Javier Lastra (ESP) | 16:16.21 |
| 100 m backstroke | Stefano Battistelli (ITA) | 58.09 | Charalambos Papanikolaou (GRE) | 59.16 | Renaud Boucher (FRA) | 59.47 |
| 200 m backstroke | Stefano Battistelli (ITA) | 2:03.37 | Charalambos Papanikolaou (GRE) | 2:04.34 | Luca Sacchi (ITA) | 2:07.30 |
| 100 m breaststroke | Gianni Minervini (ITA) | 1:02.26 | Lorenzo Carbonari (ITA) | 1:03.87 | Sergio López (ESP) | 1:05.16 |
| 200 m breaststroke | Sergio López (ESP) | 2:18.95 | Christophe Bourdon (FRA) | 2:21.22 | Andrea Cecchi (ITA) | 2:21.22 |
| 100 m butterfly | Fabrizio Rampazzo (ITA) | 55.83 | José Luis Ballester (ESP) | 56.00 | Tibor Rezmanj (YUG) | 56.29 |
| 200 m butterfly | Christophe Bordeau (FRA) | 2:03.02 | José Luis Ballester (ESP) | 2:03.63 | Marco Benedetti (ITA) | 2:06.02 |
| 200 m individual medley | Lorenzo Benucci (ITA) | 2:06.41 | Luca Sacchi (ITA) | 2:06.72 | Christophe Bordeau (FRA) | 2:07.99 |
| 400 m individual medley | Stefano Battistelli (ITA) | 4:25.59 | Christophe Bordeau (FRA) | 4:28.67 | Charalambos Papanikolaou (GRE) | 4:29.61 |
| 4 × 100 m freestyle | France | 3:25.92 | Italy | 3:27.11 | Yugoslavia | 3:32.63 |
| 4 × 200 m freestyle | Italy | 7:35.90 | France | 7:36.48 | Spain | 7:44.50 |
| 4 × 100 m medley | Italy | 3:48.29 | France | 3:53.23 | Spain | 3:53.73 |

=== Women's events ===
| Event | Gold | | Silver | | Bronze | |
|---|---|---|---|---|---|---|
| 100 m freestyle | Silvia Persi (ITA) | 57.32 | Senda Gharbi (TUN) | 58.37 | Jacqueline Delord (FRA) | 58.44 |
| 200 m freestyle | Tanya Vannini (ITA) | 2:02.52 | Silvia Persi (ITA) | 2:03.12 | Cécile Prunier (FRA) | 2:03.71 |
| 400 m freestyle | Tanya Vannini (ITA) | 4:16.49 | Claire Supiot (FRA) | 4:20.59 | Francesca Cambrini (ITA) | 4:21.57 |
| 800 m freestyle | Tanya Vannini (ITA) | 8:44.68 | Manuela Melchiorri (ITA) | 9:00.00 | Claire Supiot (FRA) | 9:05.77 |
| 100 m backstroke | Manuela Carosi (ITA) | 1:03.68 | Lorenza Vigarani (ITA) | 1:03.74 | Natalia Autric (ESP) | 1:06.27 |
| 200 m backstroke | Lorenza Vigarani (ITA) | 2:15.17 | Laura savarino (ITA) | 2:21.99 | Tanya Godina (YUG) | 2:22.88 |
| 100 m breaststroke | Manuela Dalla Valle (ITA) | 1:10.97 | Virginie Bojaryn (FRA) | 1:12.97 | Rossella Pescatori (ITA) | 1:13.17 |
| 200 m breaststroke | Manuela Dalla Valle (ITA) | 2:33.21 | Analisa Nisiro (ITA) | 2:33.62 | Virginie Bojaryn (FRA) | 2:34.72 |
| 100 m butterfly | Jacqueline Delord (FRA) | 1:02.31 | Ilania Tocchini (ITA) | 1:02.75 | Emanuela Viola (ITA) | 1:03.51 |
| 200 m butterfly | Elli Roussakis (GRE) | 2:15.65 | Elsa Nikolaidou (GRE) | 2:17.23 | Emanuela Fiano (ITA) | 2:18.22 |
| 200 m individual medley | Roberta Felotti (ITA) | 2:19.60 | Ilaria Tocchini (ITA) | 2:22.24 | Jacqueline Delord (FRA) | 2:22.38 |
| 400 m individual medley | Roberta Felotti (ITA) | 4:55.71 | Monica Pavanello (ITA) | 4:57.80 | Elli Roussakis (GRE) | 5:04.50 |
| 4 × 100 m freestyle relay | Italy | 3:52.92 | France | 3:54.44 | Spain | 4:00.34 |
| 4 × 100 m medley relay | Italy | 4:16.05 | France | 4:22.60 | Spain | 4:27.22 |

== Medal table ==
| Rank | Nation | Gold | Silver | Bronze | Total |
|---|---|---|---|---|---|
| 1 | Italy | 24 | 13 | 8 | 45 |
| 2 | France | 3 | 9 | 7 | 19 |
| 3 | Spain | 1 | 3 | 8 | 12 |
| 4 | Greece | 1 | 3 | 2 | 6 |
| 5 | Tunisia | 0 | 1 | 0 | 1 |
| 6 | Yugoslavia | 0 | 0 | 4 | 4 |
| Totals (6 entries) | | 29 | 29 | 29 | 87 |
