= Ugo Crousillat =

French water polo player (born 1990)

Personal information
- Born: 27 October 1990 (age 35) Marseille, France
- Height: 190 cm (6 ft 3 in)
- Weight: 94 kg (207 lb)

Sport
- Sport: Water polo
- Club: CN Marseille
Medal record
Men's water polo
Representing Montenegro
World Championships
Silver medal – second place	2013 Barcelona	Team

Ugo Crousillat (Montenegrin: Igo Kruzija, born 27 October 1990) is a water polo player from France. He was part of the French team at the 2016 Summer Olympics, where the team was eliminated in the group stage. He was naturalised to compete for Montenegro's national team. So far, his biggest international achievement was 2nd place at the European Water Polo Championship held in Eindhoven in 2013.

His father Marc and uncle Michel were also Olympic water polo players for France.

== See also ==
- List of World Aquatics Championships medalists in water polo
