= Kim Seong-eun =

Kim Seong-eun (Korean: 김성은) is a Korean name consisting of the family name Kim and the given name Seong-eun, and may also refer to:

- Kim Sung-eun (actress, born 1983) (born 1983), South Korean actress
- Kim Seong-eun (athlete) (born 1989), South Korean athlete
- Kim Sung-eun (actress, born 1991) (born 1991), South Korean actress
- Kim Sung-eun (boxer) (born 1943), South Korean boxer
- Kim Seong-eun (field hockey) (born 1976), South Korean hockey player
- Kim Seong-eun (politician) (1924-2007), South Korean general and politician
- Kim Seong-eun (water polo) (born 1967), South Korean water polo player
