= 2021–22 LEN Champions League preliminary round =

This article describes the group stage of the 2021–22 LEN Champions League.

== Format ==
16 teams were drawn into two groups of eight teams. Teams play against each other home-and-away in a round-robin format. The matchdays are from 26 October 2021 to 15 June 2022.

== Group A ==
Pos	Team	Pld	W	D	L	GF	GA	GD	Pts	Qualification
1	(Italy) AN Brescia	14	9	3	2	162	133	+29	30	Final 8
2	(Hungary) FTC Telekom	14	8	4	2	154	138	+16	28	Final 8
3	(Serbia) Novi Beograd (Note: Novi Beograd is already qualified as the Final 8 host.)	14	8	3	3	188	149	+39	27 (Note: Novi Beograd 23–21 (Agg.) Zodiac CNA Barceloneta)	Final 8
4	(Spain) Zodiac CNA Barceloneta	14	8	3	3	173	121	+52	27	Final 8
5	(Greece) Olympiacos	14	6	2	6	146	131	+15	20	
6	(Serbia) Radnički Kragujevac	14	4	1	9	139	159	−20	13	
7	(Croatia) Jadran Split	14	3	0	11	141	173	−32	9	
8	(Georgia (country)) Dinamo Tbilisi	14	2	0	12	130	229	−99	6	

Source: LEN

=== Matchday 1 ===
==== Olympiacos v Dinamo Tbilisi ====
26 October 2021; 19:15 (EET)	Report	Olympiacos (Greece)	20–9	(Georgia (country)) Dinamo Tbilisi	Piraeus; Referees: David Gómez (ESP); Hendrik Schopp (GER)
26 October 2021; 19:15 (EET)	Report	Score by quarters: 5–2, 4–2, 4–3, 7–2			Piraeus; Referees: David Gómez (ESP); Hendrik Schopp (GER)
26 October 2021; 19:15 (EET)	Report	Fountoulis 8	Goals	Jelača 3	Piraeus; Referees: David Gómez (ESP); Hendrik Schopp (GER)

==== Zodiac CNA Barceloneta v Jadran Split ====
26 October 2021; 19:15 (CET)	Report	Zodiac CNA Barceloneta (Spain)	11–6	(Croatia) Jadran Split	Barcelona; Referees: Raffaele Colombo (ITA); Tamás Kovács Csatlós (HUN)
26 October 2021; 19:15 (CET)	Report	Score by quarters: 3–2, 4–0, 2–3, 2–1			Barcelona; Referees: Raffaele Colombo (ITA); Tamás Kovács Csatlós (HUN)
26 October 2021; 19:15 (CET)	Report	Larumbe 4	Goals	Dužević 3	Barcelona; Referees: Raffaele Colombo (ITA); Tamás Kovács Csatlós (HUN)

==== Novi Beograd v Radnički Kragujevac ====
26 October 2021; 19:45 (CET)	Report	Novi Beograd (Serbia)	16–10	(Serbia) Radnički Kragujevac	New Belgrade; Referees: Filippo Gomez (ITA); Arkadiy Voevodin (RUS)
26 October 2021; 19:45 (CET)	Report	Score by quarters: 3–3, 5–4, 4–0, 4–3			New Belgrade; Referees: Filippo Gomez (ITA); Arkadiy Voevodin (RUS)
26 October 2021; 19:45 (CET)	Report	Jakšić 5	Goals	four players 2	New Belgrade; Referees: Filippo Gomez (ITA); Arkadiy Voevodin (RUS)

==== AN Brescia v FTC Telekom ====
26 October 2021; 20:30 (CET)	Report	AN Brescia (Italy)	8–8	(Hungary) FTC Telekom	Brescia; Referees: Boris Margeta (SLO); Andrej Franulović (CRO)
26 October 2021; 20:30 (CET)	Report	Score by quarters: 1–2, 2–2, 3–3, 2–1			Brescia; Referees: Boris Margeta (SLO); Andrej Franulović (CRO)
26 October 2021; 20:30 (CET)	Report	Lazić 3	Goals	three players 2	Brescia; Referees: Boris Margeta (SLO); Andrej Franulović (CRO)

=== Matchday 2 ===
==== Jadran Split v Dinamo Tbilisi ====
9 November 2021; 19:00 (CET)	Report	Jadran Split (Croatia)	15–13	(Georgia (country)) Dinamo Tbilisi	Split; Referees: Arnaldo Petronilli (ITA); Gernot Häntschel (GER)
9 November 2021; 19:00 (CET)	Report	Score by quarters: 3–2, 7–3, 4–2, 1–6			Split; Referees: Arnaldo Petronilli (ITA); Gernot Häntschel (GER)
9 November 2021; 19:00 (CET)	Report	three players 3	Goals	Vasić 4	Split; Referees: Arnaldo Petronilli (ITA); Gernot Häntschel (GER)

==== Novi Beograd v Olympiacos ====
9 November 2021; 19:45 (CET)	Report	Novi Beograd (Serbia)	9–12	(Greece) Olympiacos	New Belgrade; Referees: Boris Margeta (SLO); Sébastien Dervieux (FRA)
9 November 2021; 19:45 (CET)	Report	Score by quarters: 2–4, 3–2, 0–4, 4–2			New Belgrade; Referees: Boris Margeta (SLO); Sébastien Dervieux (FRA)
9 November 2021; 19:45 (CET)	Report	Shushiashvili 3	Goals	Genidounias 4	New Belgrade; Referees: Boris Margeta (SLO); Sébastien Dervieux (FRA)

==== AN Brescia v Zodiac CNA Barceloneta ====
9 November 2021; 20:30 (CET)	Report	AN Brescia (Italy)	14–12	(Spain) Zodiac CNA Barceloneta	Brescia; Referees: Georgios Stavridis (GRE); György Kun (HUN)
9 November 2021; 20:30 (CET)	Report	Score by quarters: 4–3, 3–3, 4–2, 3–4			Brescia; Referees: Georgios Stavridis (GRE); György Kun (HUN)
9 November 2021; 20:30 (CET)	Report	Vapenski 4	Goals	Granados 4	Brescia; Referees: Georgios Stavridis (GRE); György Kun (HUN)

==== Radnički Kragujevac v FTC Telekom ====
9 November 2021; 20:30 (CET)	Report	Radnički Kragujevac (Serbia)	11–11	(Hungary) FTC Telekom	Kragujevac; Referees: Jaume Teixidó (ESP); Maro Savinović (CRO)
9 November 2021; 20:30 (CET)	Report	Score by quarters: 2–2, 4–4, 1–2, 4–3			Kragujevac; Referees: Jaume Teixidó (ESP); Maro Savinović (CRO)
9 November 2021; 20:30 (CET)	Report	Ćuk 3	Goals	Jansik 4	Kragujevac; Referees: Jaume Teixidó (ESP); Maro Savinović (CRO)

=== Matchday 3 ===
==== Dinamo Tbilisi v Zodiac CNA Barceloneta ====
19 November 2021; 19:00 (FET)	Report	Dinamo Tbilisi (Georgia (country))	7–20	(Spain) Zodiac CNA Barceloneta	Tbilisi; Referees: Andreja Stanojević (SRB); Stefan Seidel (GER)
19 November 2021; 19:00 (FET)	Report	Score by quarters: 2–7, 2–4, 2–3, 1–6			Tbilisi; Referees: Andreja Stanojević (SRB); Stefan Seidel (GER)
19 November 2021; 19:00 (FET)	Report	Adeishvili 2	Goals	Granados 7	Tbilisi; Referees: Andreja Stanojević (SRB); Stefan Seidel (GER)

==== FTC Telekom v Olympiacos ====
19 November 2021; 18:30 (CET)	Report	FTC Telekom (Hungary)	9–9	(Greece) Olympiacos	Budapest; Referees: Alessandro Severo (ITA); Vojin Putniković (SRB)
19 November 2021; 18:30 (CET)	Report	Score by quarters: 3–1, 0–3, 1–2, 5–3			Budapest; Referees: Alessandro Severo (ITA); Vojin Putniković (SRB)
19 November 2021; 18:30 (CET)	Report	Vámos 3	Goals	Genidounias 3	Budapest; Referees: Alessandro Severo (ITA); Vojin Putniković (SRB)

==== Jadran Split v Novi Beograd ====
19 November 2021; 19:00 (CET)	Report	Jadran Split (Croatia)	12–17	(Serbia) Novi Beograd	Split; Referees: Jaume Teixidó (ESP); Božo Đurašković (MNE)
19 November 2021; 19:00 (CET)	Report	Score by quarters: 4–5, 2–4, 3–3, 3–5			Split; Referees: Jaume Teixidó (ESP); Božo Đurašković (MNE)
19 November 2021; 19:00 (CET)	Report	Burić 3	Goals	Jakšić, S. Rašović 4	Split; Referees: Jaume Teixidó (ESP); Božo Đurašković (MNE)

==== Radnički Kragujevac v AN Brescia ====
19 November 2021; 20:30 (CET)	Report	Radnički Kragujevac (Serbia)	8–14	(Italy) AN Brescia	Kragujevac; Referees: Arkadiy Voevodin (RUS); Radosław Koryzna (POL)
19 November 2021; 20:30 (CET)	Report	Score by quarters: 3–4, 1–5, 1–2, 3–3			Kragujevac; Referees: Arkadiy Voevodin (RUS); Radosław Koryzna (POL)
19 November 2021; 20:30 (CET)	Report	Stanojević, Vrlić 2	Goals	Renzuto 4	Kragujevac; Referees: Arkadiy Voevodin (RUS); Radosław Koryzna (POL)

=== Matchday 4 ===
==== Dinamo Tbilisi v AN Brescia ====
30 November 2021; 19:00 (FET)	Report	Dinamo Tbilisi (Georgia (country))	11–19	(Italy) AN Brescia	Tbilisi; Referees: Ivan Raković (SRB); Oriol Jaumandreu (ESP)
30 November 2021; 19:00 (FET)	Report	Score by quarters: 2–5, 2–4, 3–5, 4–5			Tbilisi; Referees: Ivan Raković (SRB); Oriol Jaumandreu (ESP)
30 November 2021; 19:00 (FET)	Report	Jelača, Adeishvili 3	Goals	three players 4	Tbilisi; Referees: Ivan Raković (SRB); Oriol Jaumandreu (ESP)

==== Olympiacos v Zodiac CNA Barceloneta ====
30 November 2021; 19:15 (EET)	Report	Olympiacos (Greece)	8–4	(Spain) Zodiac CNA Barceloneta	Piraeus; Referees: Nenad Periš (CRO); Michiel Zwart (NED)
30 November 2021; 19:15 (EET)	Report	Score by quarters: 1–0, 2–1, 3–2, 2–1			Piraeus; Referees: Nenad Periš (CRO); Michiel Zwart (NED)
30 November 2021; 19:15 (EET)	Report	Filipović, Fountoulis 2	Goals	Pavillard 2	Piraeus; Referees: Nenad Periš (CRO); Michiel Zwart (NED)

==== Jadran Split v Radnički Kragujevac ====
30 November 2021; 19:00 (CET)	Report	Jadran Split (Croatia)	9–8	(Serbia) Radnički Kragujevac	Split; Referees: György Kun (HUN); Sébastien Dervieux (FRA)
30 November 2021; 19:00 (CET)	Report	Score by quarters: 2–1, 2–2, 0–1, 5–4			Split; Referees: György Kun (HUN); Sébastien Dervieux (FRA)
30 November 2021; 19:00 (CET)	Report	Marinić Kragić 5	Goals	Vrlić 2	Split; Referees: György Kun (HUN); Sébastien Dervieux (FRA)

==== FTC Telekom v Novi Beograd ====
30 November 2021; 20:30 (CET)	Report	FTC Telekom (Hungary)	11–10	(Serbia) Novi Beograd	Budapest; Referees: Boris Margeta (SLO); Frank Ohme (GER)
30 November 2021; 20:30 (CET)	Report	Score by quarters: 3–3, 4–3, 4–3, 0–1			Budapest; Referees: Boris Margeta (SLO); Frank Ohme (GER)
30 November 2021; 20:30 (CET)	Report	Ubović 4	Goals	three players 2	Budapest; Referees: Boris Margeta (SLO); Frank Ohme (GER)

=== Matchday 5 ===
==== Olympiacos v Jadran Split ====
14 December 2021; 19:15 (EET)	Report	Olympiacos (Greece)	12–10	(Croatia) Jadran Split	Piraeus; Referees: Jaume Teixidó (ESP); Andreja Stanojević (SRB)
14 December 2021; 19:15 (EET)	Report	Score by quarters: 4–1, 4–3, 4–3, 0–3			Piraeus; Referees: Jaume Teixidó (ESP); Andreja Stanojević (SRB)
14 December 2021; 19:15 (EET)	Report	Filipović, Fountoulis 5	Goals	four players 2	Piraeus; Referees: Jaume Teixidó (ESP); Andreja Stanojević (SRB)

==== Zodiac CNA Barceloneta v FTC Telekom ====
14 December 2021; 19:00 (CET)	Report	Zodiac CNA Barceloneta (Spain)	12–12	(Hungary) FTC Telekom	Barcelona; Referees: Arkadiy Voevodin (RUS); Alessandro Severo (ITA)
14 December 2021; 19:00 (CET)	Report	Score by quarters: 3–4, 3–1, 3–3, 3–4			Barcelona; Referees: Arkadiy Voevodin (RUS); Alessandro Severo (ITA)
14 December 2021; 19:00 (CET)	Report	Larumbe 4	Goals	Merkulov, D. Varga 3	Barcelona; Referees: Arkadiy Voevodin (RUS); Alessandro Severo (ITA)

==== Novi Beograd v AN Brescia ====
14 December 2021; 19:45 (CET)	Report	Novi Beograd (Serbia)	11–11	(Italy) AN Brescia	New Belgrade; Referees: Georgios Stavridis (GRE); David Gómez (ESP)
14 December 2021; 19:45 (CET)	Report	Score by quarters: 3–2, 0–2, 4–3, 4–4			New Belgrade; Referees: Georgios Stavridis (GRE); David Gómez (ESP)
14 December 2021; 19:45 (CET)	Report	S. Rašović 4	Goals	Presciutti, Vapenski 3	New Belgrade; Referees: Georgios Stavridis (GRE); David Gómez (ESP)

==== Radnički Kragujevac v Dinamo Tbilisi ====
14 December 2021; 20:30 (CET)	Report	Radnički Kragujevac (Serbia)	14–7	(Georgia (country)) Dinamo Tbilisi	Kragujevac; Referees: Adrian T. Alexandrescu (ROU); Dragan Štampalija (CRO)
14 December 2021; 20:30 (CET)	Report	Score by quarters: 4–2, 3–1, 2–1, 5–3			Kragujevac; Referees: Adrian T. Alexandrescu (ROU); Dragan Štampalija (CRO)
14 December 2021; 20:30 (CET)	Report	Ćuk 4	Goals	Magrakvelidze 2	Kragujevac; Referees: Adrian T. Alexandrescu (ROU); Dragan Štampalija (CRO)

=== Matchday 6 ===
==== Zodiac CNA Barceloneta v Radnički Kragujevac ====
21 December 2021; 19:00 (CET)	Report	Zodiac CNA Barceloneta (Spain)	13–7	(Serbia) Radnički Kragujevac	Barcelona; Referees: Spyridon Achladiotis (GRE); Matan Schwartz (ISR)
21 December 2021; 19:00 (CET)	Report	Score by quarters: 4–2, 5–1, 2–3, 2–1			Barcelona; Referees: Spyridon Achladiotis (GRE); Matan Schwartz (ISR)
21 December 2021; 19:00 (CET)	Report	Bustos, Granados 3	Goals	Janković, Miličić 2	Barcelona; Referees: Spyridon Achladiotis (GRE); Matan Schwartz (ISR)

==== FTC Telekom v Jadran Split ====
21 December 2021; 20:30 (CET)	Report	FTC Telekom (Hungary)	14–8	(Croatia) Jadran Split	Budapest; Referees: Raffaele Colombo (ITA); David Gómez (ESP)
21 December 2021; 20:30 (CET)	Report	Score by quarters: 4–1, 5–2, 4–3, 1–2			Budapest; Referees: Raffaele Colombo (ITA); David Gómez (ESP)
21 December 2021; 20:30 (CET)	Report	Ubović 3	Goals	Marinić Kragić 4	Budapest; Referees: Raffaele Colombo (ITA); David Gómez (ESP)

==== AN Brescia v Olympiacos ====
21 December 2021; 20:30 (CET)	Report	AN Brescia (Italy)	8–7	(Greece) Olympiacos	Brescia; Referees: Adrian T. Alexandrescu (ROU); Vladimir Golikov (RUS)
21 December 2021; 20:30 (CET)	Report	Score by quarters: 2–2, 3–0, 2–4, 1–1			Brescia; Referees: Adrian T. Alexandrescu (ROU); Vladimir Golikov (RUS)
21 December 2021; 20:30 (CET)	Report	Constantin Bicari, Di Somma 2	Goals	Filipović 2	Brescia; Referees: Adrian T. Alexandrescu (ROU); Vladimir Golikov (RUS)

==== Dinamo Tbilisi v Novi Beograd ====
22 December 2021; 19:00 (FET)	Report	Dinamo Tbilisi (Georgia (country))	8–17	(Serbia) Novi Beograd	Tbilisi; Referees: Daniele Bianco (ITA); Jaume Teixidó (ESP)
22 December 2021; 19:00 (FET)	Report	Score by quarters: 2–5, 2–3, 2–5, 2–4			Tbilisi; Referees: Daniele Bianco (ITA); Jaume Teixidó (ESP)
22 December 2021; 19:00 (FET)	Report	three players 2	Goals	Shushiashvili, Vlachopoulos 3	Tbilisi; Referees: Daniele Bianco (ITA); Jaume Teixidó (ESP)

=== Matchday 7 ===
==== Olympiacos v Radnički Kragujevac ====
11 January 2022; 17:30 (EET)	Report	Olympiacos (Greece)	11–7	(Serbia) Radnički Kragujevac	Piraeus; Referees: Arkadiy Voevodin (RUS); Michiel Zwart (NED)
11 January 2022; 17:30 (EET)	Report	Score by quarters: 4–3, 2–1, 1–1, 4–2			Piraeus; Referees: Arkadiy Voevodin (RUS); Michiel Zwart (NED)
11 January 2022; 17:30 (EET)	Report	Fountoulis, Mourikis 3	Goals	Ćuk 3	Piraeus; Referees: Arkadiy Voevodin (RUS); Michiel Zwart (NED)

==== Dinamo Tbilisi v FTC Telekom ====
11 January 2022; 19:00 (FET)	Report	Dinamo Tbilisi (Georgia (country))	7–14	(Hungary) FTC Telekom	Tbilisi; Referees: Levan Berishvili (GEO); Hendrik Schopp (GER)
11 January 2022; 19:00 (FET)	Report	Score by quarters: 0–3, 1–2, 3–4, 3–5			Tbilisi; Referees: Levan Berishvili (GEO); Hendrik Schopp (GER)
11 January 2022; 19:00 (FET)	Report	Vasić 4	Goals	Jansik, Ubović 3	Tbilisi; Referees: Levan Berishvili (GEO); Hendrik Schopp (GER)

==== Zodiac CNA Barceloneta v Novi Beograd ====
11 January 2022; 20:15 (CET)	Report	Zodiac CNA Barceloneta (Spain)	12–12	(Serbia) Novi Beograd	Barcelona; Referees: Gábor Vogel (HUN); Boris Margeta (SLO)
11 January 2022; 20:15 (CET)	Report	Score by quarters: 0–1, 5–4, 3–2, 4–5			Barcelona; Referees: Gábor Vogel (HUN); Boris Margeta (SLO)
11 January 2022; 20:15 (CET)	Report	Granados 5	Goals	S. Rašović 5	Barcelona; Referees: Gábor Vogel (HUN); Boris Margeta (SLO)

==== AN Brescia v Jadran Split ====
11 January 2022; 20:30 (CET)	Report	AN Brescia (Italy)	6–5	(Croatia) Jadran Split	Brescia; Referees: Ivan Raković (SRB); Pascal Bouchez (FRA)
11 January 2022; 20:30 (CET)	Report	Score by quarters: 2–1, 0–1, 1–1, 3–2			Brescia; Referees: Ivan Raković (SRB); Pascal Bouchez (FRA)
11 January 2022; 20:30 (CET)	Report	Di Somma 3	Goals	Kharkov 2	Brescia; Referees: Ivan Raković (SRB); Pascal Bouchez (FRA)

=== Matchday 8 ===
==== FTC Telekom v Dinamo Tbilisi ====
26 January 2022; 19:00 (CET)	Report	FTC Telekom (Hungary)	16–10	(Georgia (country)) Dinamo Tbilisi	Budapest; Referees: Andreja Stanojević (SRB); Marta Cabañas (ESP)
26 January 2022; 19:00 (CET)	Report	Score by quarters: 1–2, 7–4, 5–4, 3–0			Budapest; Referees: Andreja Stanojević (SRB); Marta Cabañas (ESP)
26 January 2022; 19:00 (CET)	Report	Damonte, D. Varga 5	Goals	three players 2	Budapest; Referees: Andreja Stanojević (SRB); Marta Cabañas (ESP)

==== Jadran Split v AN Brescia ====
26 January 2022; 19:00 (CET)	Report	Jadran Split (Croatia)	14–15	(Italy) AN Brescia	Split; Referees: Boris Margeta (SLO); Svetlana Dreval (RUS)
26 January 2022; 19:00 (CET)	Report	Score by quarters: 4–2, 5–5, 1–6, 4–2			Split; Referees: Boris Margeta (SLO); Svetlana Dreval (RUS)
26 January 2022; 19:00 (CET)	Report	Kharkov, Marinić Kragić 3	Goals	Presciutti 3	Split; Referees: Boris Margeta (SLO); Svetlana Dreval (RUS)

==== Novi Beograd v Zodiac CNA Barceloneta ====
26 January 2022; 19:45 (CET)	Report	Novi Beograd (Serbia)	11–9	(Spain) Zodiac CNA Barceloneta	New Belgrade; Referees: Filippo Gomez (ITA); Radosław Koryzna (POL)
26 January 2022; 19:45 (CET)	Report	Score by quarters: 4–0, 2–2, 4–5, 1–2			New Belgrade; Referees: Filippo Gomez (ITA); Radosław Koryzna (POL)
26 January 2022; 19:45 (CET)	Report	three players 2	Goals	De Toro 3	New Belgrade; Referees: Filippo Gomez (ITA); Radosław Koryzna (POL)

==== Radnički Kragujevac v Olympiacos ====
26 January 2022; 20:30 (CET)	Report	Radnički Kragujevac (Serbia)	10–8	(Greece) Olympiacos	Kragujevac; Referees: György Kun (HUN); Sébastien Dervieux (FRA)
26 January 2022; 20:30 (CET)	Report	Score by quarters: 5–3, 2–2, 1–2, 2–1			Kragujevac; Referees: György Kun (HUN); Sébastien Dervieux (FRA)
26 January 2022; 20:30 (CET)	Report	three players 2	Goals	Fountoulis 3	Kragujevac; Referees: György Kun (HUN); Sébastien Dervieux (FRA)

=== Matchday 9 ===
==== Olympiacos v AN Brescia ====
8 February 2022; 19:15 (EET)	Report	Olympiacos (Greece)	5–8	(Italy) AN Brescia	Piraeus; Referees: Jaume Teixidó (ESP); Radosław Koryzna (POL)
8 February 2022; 19:15 (EET)	Report	Score by quarters: 0–2, 0–1, 2–3, 3–2			Piraeus; Referees: Jaume Teixidó (ESP); Radosław Koryzna (POL)
8 February 2022; 19:15 (EET)	Report	Filipović 3	Goals	Luongo 3	Piraeus; Referees: Jaume Teixidó (ESP); Radosław Koryzna (POL)

==== Radnički Kragujevac v Zodiac CNA Barceloneta ====
9 February 2022; 19:00 (CET)	Report	Radnički Kragujevac (Serbia)	3–9	(Spain) Zodiac CNA Barceloneta	Kragujevac; Referees: Alessandro Severo (ITA); Nikolaos Boudramis (GRE)
9 February 2022; 19:00 (CET)	Report	Score by quarters: 0–7, 0–1, 2–1, 1–0			Kragujevac; Referees: Alessandro Severo (ITA); Nikolaos Boudramis (GRE)
9 February 2022; 19:00 (CET)	Report	three players 1	Goals	Granados 3	Kragujevac; Referees: Alessandro Severo (ITA); Nikolaos Boudramis (GRE)

==== Jadran Split v FTC Telekom ====
9 February 2022; 19:00 (CET)	Report	Jadran Split (Croatia)	9–7	(Hungary) FTC Telekom	Split; Referees: Adrian T. Alexandrescu (ROU); Arkadiy Voevodin (RUS)
9 February 2022; 19:00 (CET)	Report	Score by quarters: 2–0, 3–3, 3–2, 1–2			Split; Referees: Adrian T. Alexandrescu (ROU); Arkadiy Voevodin (RUS)
9 February 2022; 19:00 (CET)	Report	Dobud 3	Goals	Merkulov, Ubović 2	Split; Referees: Adrian T. Alexandrescu (ROU); Arkadiy Voevodin (RUS)

==== Novi Beograd v Dinamo Tbilisi ====
9 February 2022; 19:45 (CET)	Report	Novi Beograd (Serbia)	19–7	(Georgia (country)) Dinamo Tbilisi	New Belgrade; Referees: Pascal Bouchez (FRA); Božo Đurašković (MNE)
9 February 2022; 19:45 (CET)	Report	Score by quarters: 5–1, 2–2, 6–2, 6–2			New Belgrade; Referees: Pascal Bouchez (FRA); Božo Đurašković (MNE)
9 February 2022; 19:45 (CET)	Report	S. Rašović 4	Goals	Jelača, Vasić 2	New Belgrade; Referees: Pascal Bouchez (FRA); Božo Đurašković (MNE)

=== Matchday 10 ===
==== Dinamo Tbilisi v Radnički Kragujevac ====
23 February 2022; 19:00 (FET)	Report	Dinamo Tbilisi (Georgia (country))	13–17	(Serbia) Radnički Kragujevac	Tbilisi; Referees: Rajmund Fodor (HUN); Matan Schwartz (ISR)
23 February 2022; 19:00 (FET)	Report	Score by quarters: 3–6, 5–5, 2–4, 3–2			Tbilisi; Referees: Rajmund Fodor (HUN); Matan Schwartz (ISR)
23 February 2022; 19:00 (FET)	Report	Dadvani, Vasić 4	Goals	three players 3	Tbilisi; Referees: Rajmund Fodor (HUN); Matan Schwartz (ISR)

==== Jadran Split v Olympiacos ====
23 February 2022; 19:00 (CET)	Report	Jadran Split (Croatia)	12–16	(Greece) Olympiacos	Split; Referees: Alessandro Severo (ITA); Frank Ohme (GER)
23 February 2022; 19:00 (CET)	Report	Score by quarters: 2–4, 3–3, 3–5, 4–4			Split; Referees: Alessandro Severo (ITA); Frank Ohme (GER)
23 February 2022; 19:00 (CET)	Report	Kharkov, Marinić Kragić 3	Goals	Genidounias 4	Split; Referees: Alessandro Severo (ITA); Frank Ohme (GER)

==== FTC Telekom v Zodiac CNA Barceloneta ====
23 February 2022; 19:00 (CET)	Report	FTC Telekom (Hungary)	7–17	(Spain) Zodiac CNA Barceloneta	Budapest; Referees: Boris Margeta (SLO); Andrej Franulović (CRO)
23 February 2022; 19:00 (CET)	Report	Score by quarters: 3–7, 2–5, 1–3, 1–2			Budapest; Referees: Boris Margeta (SLO); Andrej Franulović (CRO)
23 February 2022; 19:00 (CET)	Report	Jansik, Vámos 2	Goals	Granados 5	Budapest; Referees: Boris Margeta (SLO); Andrej Franulović (CRO)

==== AN Brescia v Novi Beograd ====
23 February 2022; 20:30 (CET)	Report	AN Brescia (Italy)	13–16	(Serbia) Novi Beograd	Brescia; Referees: György Kun (HUN); Adrian T. Alexandrescu (ROU)
23 February 2022; 20:30 (CET)	Report	Score by quarters: 4–3, 4–4, 3–4, 2–5			Brescia; Referees: György Kun (HUN); Adrian T. Alexandrescu (ROU)
23 February 2022; 20:30 (CET)	Report	Dolce 4	Goals	D. Pijetlović 5	Brescia; Referees: György Kun (HUN); Adrian T. Alexandrescu (ROU)

=== Matchday 11 ===
==== Zodiac CNA Barceloneta v Olympiacos ====
30 March 2022; 19:30 (CET)	Report	Zodiac CNA Barceloneta (Spain)	9–5	(Greece) Olympiacos	Barcelona; Referees: Filippo Gomez (ITA); Vojin Putniković (SRB)
30 March 2022; 19:30 (CET)	Report	Score by quarters: 2–1, 3–2, 2–0, 2–2			Barcelona; Referees: Filippo Gomez (ITA); Vojin Putniković (SRB)
30 March 2022; 19:30 (CET)	Report	Larumbe, Munárriz 2	Goals	Genidounias, Filipović 2	Barcelona; Referees: Filippo Gomez (ITA); Vojin Putniković (SRB)

==== Novi Beograd v FTC Telekom ====
30 March 2022; 19:45 (CET)	Report	Novi Beograd (Serbia)	11–14	(Hungary) FTC Telekom	New Belgrade; Referees: Alessandro Severo (ITA); Radosław Koryzna (POL)
30 March 2022; 19:45 (CET)	Report	Score by quarters: 3–6, 0–1, 4–2, 4–5			New Belgrade; Referees: Alessandro Severo (ITA); Radosław Koryzna (POL)
30 March 2022; 19:45 (CET)	Report	Jakšić 3	Goals	Fekete 3	New Belgrade; Referees: Alessandro Severo (ITA); Radosław Koryzna (POL)

==== AN Brescia v Dinamo Tbilisi ====
30 March 2022; 20:30 (CET)	Report	AN Brescia (Italy)	16–8	(Georgia (country)) Dinamo Tbilisi	Brescia; Referees: Nenad Periš (CRO); Oriol Jaumandreu (ESP)
30 March 2022; 20:30 (CET)	Report	Score by quarters: 4–2, 3–3, 6–1, 3–2			Brescia; Referees: Nenad Periš (CRO); Oriol Jaumandreu (ESP)
30 March 2022; 20:30 (CET)	Report	Di Somma 5	Goals	Meskhi 3	Brescia; Referees: Nenad Periš (CRO); Oriol Jaumandreu (ESP)

==== Radnički Kragujevac v Jadran Split ====
30 March 2022; 20:30 (CET)	Report	Radnički Kragujevac (Serbia)	13–10	(Croatia) Jadran Split	Kragujevac; Referees: Raffaele Colombo (ITA); Georgios Stavridis (GRE)
30 March 2022; 20:30 (CET)	Report	Score by quarters: 2–4, 5–4, 4–1, 2–1			Kragujevac; Referees: Raffaele Colombo (ITA); Georgios Stavridis (GRE)
30 March 2022; 20:30 (CET)	Report	Branković, Lukić 3	Goals	Bukić 3	Kragujevac; Referees: Raffaele Colombo (ITA); Georgios Stavridis (GRE)

=== Matchday 12 ===
==== Novi Beograd v Jadran Split ====
8 April 2022; 18:45 (CET)	Report	Novi Beograd (Serbia)	14–7	(Croatia) Jadran Split	New Belgrade; Referees: Michiel Zwart (NED); Hendrik Schopp (GER)
8 April 2022; 18:45 (CET)	Report	Score by quarters: 3–2, 2–4, 5–1, 4–0			New Belgrade; Referees: Michiel Zwart (NED); Hendrik Schopp (GER)
8 April 2022; 18:45 (CET)	Report	Mandić 3	Goals	Marinić Kragić 2	New Belgrade; Referees: Michiel Zwart (NED); Hendrik Schopp (GER)

==== Zodiac CNA Barceloneta v Dinamo Tbilisi ====
9 April 2022; 12:30 (CET)	Report	Zodiac CNA Barceloneta (Spain)	18–4	(Georgia (country)) Dinamo Tbilisi	Barcelona; Referees: Raffaele Colombo (ITA); Veselin Mišković (MNE)
9 April 2022; 12:30 (CET)	Report	Score by quarters: 3–2, 7–2, 5–0, 3–0			Barcelona; Referees: Raffaele Colombo (ITA); Veselin Mišković (MNE)
9 April 2022; 12:30 (CET)	Report	Munárriz 7	Goals	Vasić 2	Barcelona; Referees: Raffaele Colombo (ITA); Veselin Mišković (MNE)

==== Olympiacos v FTC Telekom ====
9 April 2022; 19:15 (EET)	Report	Olympiacos (Greece)	8–10	(Hungary) FTC Telekom	Piraeus; Referees: Sébastien Dervieux (FRA); Matan Schwartz (ISR)
9 April 2022; 19:15 (EET)	Report	Score by quarters: 1–1, 3–3, 2–5, 2–1			Piraeus; Referees: Sébastien Dervieux (FRA); Matan Schwartz (ISR)
9 April 2022; 19:15 (EET)	Report	Filipović 3	Goals	Vigvári 3	Piraeus; Referees: Sébastien Dervieux (FRA); Matan Schwartz (ISR)

==== Radnički Kragujevac v AN Brescia ====
9 April 2022; 19:00 (CET)	Report	AN Brescia (Italy)	12–8	(Serbia) Radnički Kragujevac	Brescia; Referees: Frank Ohme (GER); Dragan Štampalija (CRO)
9 April 2022; 19:00 (CET)	Report	Score by quarters: 4–2, 2–0, 3–2, 3–4			Brescia; Referees: Frank Ohme (GER); Dragan Štampalija (CRO)
9 April 2022; 19:00 (CET)	Report	five players 2	Goals	Lukić, Radulović 2	Brescia; Referees: Frank Ohme (GER); Dragan Štampalija (CRO)

=== Matchday 13 ===
==== Olympiacos v Novi Beograd ====
20 April 2022; 16:45 (EET)	Report	Olympiacos (Greece)	12–12	(Serbia) Novi Beograd	Piraeus; Referees: Radosław Koryzna (POL); Andrej Franulović (CRO)
20 April 2022; 16:45 (EET)	Report	Score by quarters: 2–3, 2–3, 5–3, 3–3			Piraeus; Referees: Radosław Koryzna (POL); Andrej Franulović (CRO)
20 April 2022; 16:45 (EET)	Report	Genidounias 4	Goals	S. Rašović 5	Piraeus; Referees: Radosław Koryzna (POL); Andrej Franulović (CRO)

==== Dinamo Tbilisi v Jadran Split ====
20 April 2022; 19:00 (FET)	Report	Dinamo Tbilisi (Georgia (country))	12–11	(Croatia) Jadran Split	Tbilisi; Referees: Erkan Türkkan (TUR); Ivan Raković (SRB)
20 April 2022; 19:00 (FET)	Report	Score by quarters: 2–2, 3–2, 3–4, 4–3			Tbilisi; Referees: Erkan Türkkan (TUR); Ivan Raković (SRB)
20 April 2022; 19:00 (FET)	Report	Imnaishvili, Sarić 3	Goals	Marinić Kragić 4	Tbilisi; Referees: Erkan Türkkan (TUR); Ivan Raković (SRB)

==== FTC Telekom v Radnički Kragujevac ====
20 April 2022; 19:00 (CET)	Report	FTC Telekom (Hungary)	13–12	(Serbia) Radnički Kragujevac	Budapest; Referees: Boris Margeta (SLO); Michail Birakis (GRE)
20 April 2022; 19:00 (CET)	Report	Score by quarters: 4–4, 3–4, 2–2, 4–2			Budapest; Referees: Boris Margeta (SLO); Michail Birakis (GRE)
20 April 2022; 19:00 (CET)	Report	Vámos 5	Goals	Radulović 4	Budapest; Referees: Boris Margeta (SLO); Michail Birakis (GRE)

==== Zodiac CNA Barceloneta v AN Brescia ====
20 April 2022; 20:15 (CET)	Report	Zodiac CNA Barceloneta (Spain)	12–12	(Italy) AN Brescia	Barcelona; Referees: Nenad Periš (CRO); Sébastien Dervieux (FRA)
20 April 2022; 20:15 (CET)	Report	Score by quarters: 3–4, 3–3, 2–3, 4–2			Barcelona; Referees: Nenad Periš (CRO); Sébastien Dervieux (FRA)
20 April 2022; 20:15 (CET)	Report	Pavillard 4	Goals	Renzuto 3	Barcelona; Referees: Nenad Periš (CRO); Sébastien Dervieux (FRA)

=== Matchday 14 ===
==== Dinamo Tbilisi v Olympiacos ====
11 May 2022; 19:00 (FET)	Report	Dinamo Tbilisi (Georgia (country))	14–13	(Greece) Olympiacos	Tbilisi; Referees: Vojin Putniković (SRB); Daniele Bianco (ITA)
11 May 2022; 19:00 (FET)	Report	Score by quarters: 4–3, 5–3, 2–3, 3–4			Tbilisi; Referees: Vojin Putniković (SRB); Daniele Bianco (ITA)
11 May 2022; 19:00 (FET)	Report	Sarić 4	Goals	three players 3	Tbilisi; Referees: Vojin Putniković (SRB); Daniele Bianco (ITA)

==== Jadran Split v Zodiac CNA Barceloneta ====
11 May 2022; 19:00 (CET)	Report	Jadran Split (Croatia)	13–15	(Spain) Zodiac CNA Barceloneta	Split; Referees: Filippo Gomez (ITA); Gernot Häntschel (GER)
11 May 2022; 19:00 (CET)	Report	Score by quarters: 3–5, 2–3, 4–4, 4–3			Split; Referees: Filippo Gomez (ITA); Gernot Häntschel (GER)
11 May 2022; 19:00 (CET)	Report	Kharkov, Marinić Kragić 3	Goals	Pavillard, Perrone 3	Split; Referees: Filippo Gomez (ITA); Gernot Häntschel (GER)

==== FTC Telekom v AN Brescia ====
11 May 2022; 19:00 (CET)	Report	FTC Telekom (Hungary)	8–6	(Italy) AN Brescia	Budapest; Referees: Marko Savinović (CRO); Georgios Stavridis (GRE)
11 May 2022; 19:00 (CET)	Report	Score by quarters: 1–2, 1–1, 1–1, 5–2			Budapest; Referees: Marko Savinović (CRO); Georgios Stavridis (GRE)
11 May 2022; 19:00 (CET)	Report	D. Varga 3	Goals	Constantin Bicari 2	Budapest; Referees: Marko Savinović (CRO); Georgios Stavridis (GRE)

==== Radnički Kragujevac v Novi Beograd ====
11 May 2022; 20:30 (CET)	Report	Radnički Kragujevac (Serbia)	11–13	(Serbia) Novi Beograd	Kragujevac; Referees: Matan Schwartz (ISR); Michiel Zwart (NED)
11 May 2022; 20:30 (CET)	Report	Score by quarters: 4–3, 2–3, 3–4, 2–3			Kragujevac; Referees: Matan Schwartz (ISR); Michiel Zwart (NED)
11 May 2022; 20:30 (CET)	Report	Ukropina 5	Goals	Mandić 3	Kragujevac; Referees: Matan Schwartz (ISR); Michiel Zwart (NED)

== Group B ==
Pos	Team	Pld	W	D	L	GF	GA	GD	Pts	Qualification
1	(Italy) Pro Recco	14	13	0	1	200	100	+100	39	Final 8
2	(France) CN Marseille	14	11	0	3	170	119	+51	33	Final 8
3	(Croatia) Jug AO Dubrovnik	14	10	1	3	174	143	+31	31	Final 8
4	(Germany) Waspo 98 Hannover	14	6	3	5	150	180	−30	21	Final 8
5	(Hungary) OSC Budapest	14	6	1	7	151	168	−17	19	
6	(Germany) Spandau 04	14	3	1	10	133	148	−15	10	
7	(Serbia) Crvena zvezda	14	2	1	11	133	178	−45	7	
8	(Romania) Steaua București	14	1	1	12	111	186	−75	4	

Source: LEN

=== Matchday 1 ===
==== CN Marseille v Pro Recco ====
27 October 2021; 20:30 (CET)	Report	CN Marseille (France)	7–13	(Italy) Pro Recco	Marseille; Referees: Nikolaos Boudramis (GRE); Vojin Putniković (SRB)
27 October 2021; 20:30 (CET)	Report	Score by quarters: 1–1, 2–2, 1–6, 3–4			Marseille; Referees: Nikolaos Boudramis (GRE); Vojin Putniković (SRB)
27 October 2021; 20:30 (CET)	Report	Vernoux 3	Goals	Zalánki 4	Marseille; Referees: Nikolaos Boudramis (GRE); Vojin Putniković (SRB)

==== Jug AO Dubrovnik v Waspo 98 Hannover ====
27 October 2021; 19:00 (CET)	Report	Jug AO Dubrovnik (Croatia)	13–7	(Germany) Waspo 98 Hannover	Dubrovnik; Referees: Georgios Stavridis (GRE); Veselin Mišković (MNE)
27 October 2021; 19:00 (CET)	Report	Score by quarters: 5–0, 2–2, 5–1, 1–4			Dubrovnik; Referees: Georgios Stavridis (GRE); Veselin Mišković (MNE)
27 October 2021; 19:00 (CET)	Report	Benić 4	Goals	D. Brguljan, Radović 3	Dubrovnik; Referees: Georgios Stavridis (GRE); Veselin Mišković (MNE)

==== OSC Budapest v Steaua București ====
27 October 2021; 19:00 (CET)	Report	OSC Budapest (Hungary)	14–8	(Romania) Steaua București	Budapest; Referees: Ivan Raković (SRB); Jaume Teixidó (ESP)
27 October 2021; 19:00 (CET)	Report	Score by quarters: 4–2, 3–2, 4–2, 3–2			Budapest; Referees: Ivan Raković (SRB); Jaume Teixidó (ESP)
27 October 2021; 19:00 (CET)	Report	three players 3	Goals	three players 2	Budapest; Referees: Ivan Raković (SRB); Jaume Teixidó (ESP)

==== Crvena zvezda v Spandau 04 ====
27 October 2021; 20:00 (CET)	Report	Crvena zvezda (Serbia)	12–9	(Germany) Spandau 04	Belgrade; Referees: Nenad Periš (CRO); György Kun (HUN)
27 October 2021; 20:00 (CET)	Report	Score by quarters: 1–2, 4–3, 4–0, 3–4			Belgrade; Referees: Nenad Periš (CRO); György Kun (HUN)
27 October 2021; 20:00 (CET)	Report	Đurđić, Vukićević 3	Goals	four players 2	Belgrade; Referees: Nenad Periš (CRO); György Kun (HUN)

=== Matchday 2 ===
==== Jug AO Dubrovnik v CN Marseille ====
10 November 2021; 19:00 (CET)	Report	Jug AO Dubrovnik (Croatia)	9–14	(France) CN Marseille	Dubrovnik; Referees: Gábor Vogel (HUN); Alessandro Severo (ITA)
10 November 2021; 19:00 (CET)	Report	Score by quarters: 0–3, 4–3, 4–5, 1–3			Dubrovnik; Referees: Gábor Vogel (HUN); Alessandro Severo (ITA)
10 November 2021; 19:00 (CET)	Report	Fatović 4	Goals	Crousillat 4	Dubrovnik; Referees: Gábor Vogel (HUN); Alessandro Severo (ITA)

==== Spandau 04 v Waspo 98 Hannover ====
10 November 2021; 19:00 (CET)	Report	Spandau 04 (Germany)	11–11	(Germany) Waspo 98 Hannover	Berlin; Referees: Arkadiy Voevodin (RUS); Matan Schwartz (ISR)
10 November 2021; 19:00 (CET)	Report	Score by quarters: 3–2, 1–2, 4–1, 3–6			Berlin; Referees: Arkadiy Voevodin (RUS); Matan Schwartz (ISR)
10 November 2021; 19:00 (CET)	Report	Dedović, Kholod 3	Goals	Nagaev 3	Berlin; Referees: Arkadiy Voevodin (RUS); Matan Schwartz (ISR)

==== Crvena zvezda v OSC Budapest ====
10 November 2021; 20:15 (CET)	Report	Crvena zvezda (Serbia)	8–11	(Hungary) OSC Budapest	Belgrade; Referees: David Gómez (ESP); Michail Birakis (GRE)
10 November 2021; 20:15 (CET)	Report	Score by quarters: 0–2, 3–3, 1–3, 4–3			Belgrade; Referees: David Gómez (ESP); Michail Birakis (GRE)
10 November 2021; 20:15 (CET)	Report	Gardašević, Subotić 2	Goals	Hárai 3	Belgrade; Referees: David Gómez (ESP); Michail Birakis (GRE)

==== Pro Recco v Steaua București ====
10 November 2021; 21:00 (CET)	Report	Pro Recco (Italy)	23–5	(Romania) Steaua București	Recco; Referees: Ivan Raković (SRB); Levan Berishvili (GEO)
10 November 2021; 21:00 (CET)	Report	Score by quarters: 4–1, 5–2, 7–2, 7–0			Recco; Referees: Ivan Raković (SRB); Levan Berishvili (GEO)
10 November 2021; 21:00 (CET)	Report	Zalánki 7	Goals	Georgescu 2	Recco; Referees: Ivan Raković (SRB); Levan Berishvili (GEO)

=== Matchday 3 ===
==== Waspo 98 Hannover v OSC Budapest ====
20 November 2021; 14:00 (CET)	Report	Waspo 98 Hannover (Germany)	12–12	(Hungary) OSC Budapest	Hannover; Referees: Pascal Bouchez (FRA); Nenad Periš (CRO)
20 November 2021; 14:00 (CET)	Report	Score by quarters: 4–2, 2–6, 1–1, 5–3			Hannover; Referees: Pascal Bouchez (FRA); Nenad Periš (CRO)
20 November 2021; 14:00 (CET)	Report	D. Brguljan, Winkelhorst 3	Goals	Burián, Vigvári 3	Hannover; Referees: Pascal Bouchez (FRA); Nenad Periš (CRO)

==== Spandau 04 v Jug AO Dubrovnik ====
20 November 2021; 19:00 (CET)	Report	Spandau 04 (Germany)	8–16	(Croatia) Jug AO Dubrovnik	Berlin; Referees: Xavier F. Buch (ESP); Georgios Polychronopoulos (GRE)
20 November 2021; 19:00 (CET)	Report	Score by quarters: 3–4, 1–5, 2–3, 2–4			Berlin; Referees: Xavier F. Buch (ESP); Georgios Polychronopoulos (GRE)
20 November 2021; 19:00 (CET)	Report	Kholod 3	Goals	Kakaris 5	Berlin; Referees: Xavier F. Buch (ESP); Georgios Polychronopoulos (GRE)

==== Steaua București v CN Marseille ====
20 November 2021; 20:00 (EET)	Report	Steaua București (Romania)	6–14	(France) CN Marseille	Bucharest; Referees: Raffaele Colombo (ITA); Tamás Kovács Csatlós (HUN)
20 November 2021; 20:00 (EET)	Report	Score by quarters: 2–2, 3–4, 1–5, 0–3			Bucharest; Referees: Raffaele Colombo (ITA); Tamás Kovács Csatlós (HUN)
20 November 2021; 20:00 (EET)	Report	six players 1	Goals	Prlainović 4	Bucharest; Referees: Raffaele Colombo (ITA); Tamás Kovács Csatlós (HUN)

==== Pro Recco v Crvena zvezda ====
20 November 2021; 21:00 (CET)	Report	Pro Recco (Italy)	13–7	(Serbia) Crvena zvezda	Recco; Referees: Nikolaos Boudramis (GRE); Tomi Kavčič (SLO)
20 November 2021; 21:00 (CET)	Report	Score by quarters: 4–3, 5–2, 2–1, 2–1			Recco; Referees: Nikolaos Boudramis (GRE); Tomi Kavčič (SLO)
20 November 2021; 21:00 (CET)	Report	Di Fulvio 4	Goals	Subotić 4	Recco; Referees: Nikolaos Boudramis (GRE); Tomi Kavčič (SLO)

=== Matchday 4 ===
==== OSC Budapest v CN Marseille ====
1 December 2021; 19:00 (CET)	Report	OSC Budapest (Hungary)	9–14	(France) CN Marseille	Budapest; Referees: Georgios Stavridis (GRE); David Gómez (ESP)
1 December 2021; 19:00 (CET)	Report	Score by quarters: 2–3, 2–4, 2–4, 3–3			Budapest; Referees: Georgios Stavridis (GRE); David Gómez (ESP)
1 December 2021; 19:00 (CET)	Report	Manhercz 3	Goals	four players 2	Budapest; Referees: Georgios Stavridis (GRE); David Gómez (ESP)

==== Steaua București v Jug AO Dubrovnik ====
1 December 2021; 20:00 (EET)	Report	Steaua București (Romania)	8–10	(Croatia) Jug AO Dubrovnik	Bucharest; Referees: Spyridon Achladiotis (GRE); Radosław Koryzna (POL)
1 December 2021; 20:00 (EET)	Report	Score by quarters: 2–5, 3–1, 1–1, 2–3			Bucharest; Referees: Spyridon Achladiotis (GRE); Radosław Koryzna (POL)
1 December 2021; 20:00 (EET)	Report	Fulea, Georgescu 3	Goals	Joković 3	Bucharest; Referees: Spyridon Achladiotis (GRE); Radosław Koryzna (POL)

==== Crvena zvezda v Waspo 98 Hannover ====
1 December 2021; 20:30 (CET)	Report	Crvena zvezda (Serbia)	12–15	(Germany) Waspo 98 Hannover	Belgrade; Referees: Matan Schwartz (ISR); Gábor Vogel (HUN)
1 December 2021; 20:30 (CET)	Report	Score by quarters: 3–6, 4–4, 3–2, 2–3			Belgrade; Referees: Matan Schwartz (ISR); Gábor Vogel (HUN)
1 December 2021; 20:30 (CET)	Report	Basara, Subotić 3	Goals	D. Brguljan 4	Belgrade; Referees: Matan Schwartz (ISR); Gábor Vogel (HUN)

==== Pro Recco v Spandau 04 ====
1 December 2021; 21:00 (CET)	Report	Pro Recco (Italy)	14–9	(Germany) Spandau 04	Recco; Referees: Andrej Franulović (CRO); Vojin Putniković (SRB)
1 December 2021; 21:00 (CET)	Report	Score by quarters: 5–3, 5–3, 1–0, 3–3			Recco; Referees: Andrej Franulović (CRO); Vojin Putniković (SRB)
1 December 2021; 21:00 (CET)	Report	five players 2	Goals	Dedović 2	Recco; Referees: Andrej Franulović (CRO); Vojin Putniković (SRB)

=== Matchday 5 ===
==== CN Marseille v Waspo 98 Hannover ====
15 December 2021; 19:00 (CET)	Report	CN Marseille (France)	13–10	(Germany) Waspo 98 Hannover	Marseille; Referees: György Kun (HUN); Raffaele Colombo (ITA)
15 December 2021; 19:00 (CET)	Report	Score by quarters: 4–2, 4–4, 2–0, 3–4			Marseille; Referees: György Kun (HUN); Raffaele Colombo (ITA)
15 December 2021; 19:00 (CET)	Report	Crousillat, Prlainović 3	Goals	Radović 3	Marseille; Referees: György Kun (HUN); Raffaele Colombo (ITA)

==== Spandau 04 v Steaua București ====
15 December 2021; 19:00 (CET)	Report	Spandau 04 (Germany)	10–8	(Romania) Steaua București	Berlin; Referees: Pascal Bouchez (FRA); Radosław Koryzna (POL)
15 December 2021; 19:00 (CET)	Report	Score by quarters: 3–0, 3–2, 2–4, 2–2			Berlin; Referees: Pascal Bouchez (FRA); Radosław Koryzna (POL)
15 December 2021; 19:00 (CET)	Report	Strelezkij 3	Goals	Fulea 3	Berlin; Referees: Pascal Bouchez (FRA); Radosław Koryzna (POL)

==== OSC Budapest v Pro Recco ====
15 December 2021; 19:00 (CET)	Report	OSC Budapest (Hungary)	8–14	(Italy) Pro Recco	Budapest; Referees: Boris Margeta (SLO); Hendrik Schopp (GER)
15 December 2021; 19:00 (CET)	Report	Score by quarters: 2–5, 1–1, 3–4, 2–4			Budapest; Referees: Boris Margeta (SLO); Hendrik Schopp (GER)
15 December 2021; 19:00 (CET)	Report	Csacsovszky, Hárai 2	Goals	Ivović 3	Budapest; Referees: Boris Margeta (SLO); Hendrik Schopp (GER)

==== Crvena zvezda v Jug AO Dubrovnik ====
15 December 2021; 20:00 (CET)	Report	Crvena zvezda (Serbia)	13–19	(Croatia) Jug AO Dubrovnik	Belgrade; Referees: Nikolaos Boudramis (GRE); Levan Berishvili (GEO)
15 December 2021; 20:00 (CET)	Report	Score by quarters: 4–4, 2–7, 4–4, 3–4			Belgrade; Referees: Nikolaos Boudramis (GRE); Levan Berishvili (GEO)
15 December 2021; 20:00 (CET)	Report	Basara 6	Goals	Fatović, Joković 5	Belgrade; Referees: Nikolaos Boudramis (GRE); Levan Berishvili (GEO)

=== Matchday 6 ===
==== CN Marseille v Spandau 04 ====
22 December 2021; 19:00 (CET)	Report	CN Marseille (France)	12–7	(Germany) Spandau 04	Marseille; Referees: Vojin Putniković (SRB); Veselin Mišković (MNE)
22 December 2021; 19:00 (CET)	Report	Score by quarters: 2–1, 4–3, 3–1, 3–2			Marseille; Referees: Vojin Putniković (SRB); Veselin Mišković (MNE)
22 December 2021; 19:00 (CET)	Report	Crousillat, Vernoux 3	Goals	Strelezkij 3	Marseille; Referees: Vojin Putniković (SRB); Veselin Mišković (MNE)

==== Waspo 98 Hannover v Pro Recco ====
22 December 2021; 19:00 (CET)	Report	Waspo 98 Hannover (Germany)	7–20	(Italy) Pro Recco	Hannover; Referees: Nenad Periš (CRO); Tamás Kovács Csatlós (HUN)
22 December 2021; 19:00 (CET)	Report	Score by quarters: 1–5, 4–4, 1–6, 1–5			Hannover; Referees: Nenad Periš (CRO); Tamás Kovács Csatlós (HUN)
22 December 2021; 19:00 (CET)	Report	Radović, Muslim 2	Goals	Zalánki 4	Hannover; Referees: Nenad Periš (CRO); Tamás Kovács Csatlós (HUN)

==== Jug AO Dubrovnik v OSC Budapest ====
22 December 2021; 19:00 (CET)	Report	Jug AO Dubrovnik (Croatia)	11–12	(Hungary) OSC Budapest	Dubrovnik; Referees: Alessandro Severo (ITA); Sébastien Dervieux (FRA)
22 December 2021; 19:00 (CET)	Report	Score by quarters: 3–3, 2–2, 2–4, 4–3			Dubrovnik; Referees: Alessandro Severo (ITA); Sébastien Dervieux (FRA)
22 December 2021; 19:00 (CET)	Report	Kakaris 3	Goals	Csacsovszky 5	Dubrovnik; Referees: Alessandro Severo (ITA); Sébastien Dervieux (FRA)

==== Steaua București v Crvena zvezda ====
22 December 2021; 20:00 (EET)	Report	Steaua București (Romania)	11–8	(Serbia) Crvena zvezda	Bucharest; Referees: Frank Ohme (GER); Rajmund Fodor (HUN)
22 December 2021; 20:00 (EET)	Report	Score by quarters: 3–0, 1–3, 4–2, 3–3			Bucharest; Referees: Frank Ohme (GER); Rajmund Fodor (HUN)
22 December 2021; 20:00 (EET)	Report	Vancsik 3	Goals	Basara 3	Bucharest; Referees: Frank Ohme (GER); Rajmund Fodor (HUN)

=== Matchday 7 ===
==== Jug AO Dubrovnik v Pro Recco ====
12 January 2022; 19:00 (CET)	Report	Jug AO Dubrovnik (Croatia)	11–8	(Italy) Pro Recco	Dubrovnik; Referees: Georgios Stavridis (GRE); György Kun (HUN)
12 January 2022; 19:00 (CET)	Report	Score by quarters: 2–3, 4–2, 4–1, 1–2			Dubrovnik; Referees: Georgios Stavridis (GRE); György Kun (HUN)
12 January 2022; 19:00 (CET)	Report	Argyropoulos, Fatović 3	Goals	Younger, Zalánki 2	Dubrovnik; Referees: Georgios Stavridis (GRE); György Kun (HUN)

==== Steaua București v Waspo 98 Hannover ====
12 January 2022; 20:00 (EET)	Report	Steaua București (Romania)	9–10	(Germany) Waspo 98 Hannover	Bucharest; Referees: Filippo Gomez (ITA); Pau Segurana (ESP)
12 January 2022; 20:00 (EET)	Report	Score by quarters: 1–3, 2–2, 3–3, 3–2			Bucharest; Referees: Filippo Gomez (ITA); Pau Segurana (ESP)
12 January 2022; 20:00 (EET)	Report	Gheorghe 3	Goals	D. Brguljan 3	Bucharest; Referees: Filippo Gomez (ITA); Pau Segurana (ESP)

==== OSC Budapest v Spandau 04 ====
12 January 2022; 19:00 (CET)	Report	OSC Budapest (Hungary)	0–10	(Germany) Spandau 04	Budapest

==== CN Marseille v Crvena zvezda ====
12 January 2022; 19:00 (CET)	Report	CN Marseille (France)	10–0	(Serbia) Crvena zvezda	Marseille

=== Matchday 8 ===
==== Waspo 98 Hannover v Steaua București ====
25 January 2022; 18:00 (CET)	Report	Waspo 98 Hannover (Germany)	13–12	(Romania) Steaua București	Hannover; Referees: Vojin Putniković (SRB); Luca Castagnola (ITA)
25 January 2022; 18:00 (CET)	Report	Score by quarters: 5–2, 2–2, 3–5, 3–3			Hannover; Referees: Vojin Putniković (SRB); Luca Castagnola (ITA)
25 January 2022; 18:00 (CET)	Report	D. Brguljan 3	Goals	three players 2	Hannover; Referees: Vojin Putniković (SRB); Luca Castagnola (ITA)

==== Spandau 04 v OSC Budapest ====
25 January 2022; 19:00 (CET)	Report	Spandau 04 (Germany)	11–12	(Hungary) OSC Budapest	Berlin; Referees: Matan Schwartz (ISR); Andrej Franulović (CRO)
25 January 2022; 19:00 (CET)	Report	Score by quarters: 4–3, 1–2, 3–2, 3–4			Berlin; Referees: Matan Schwartz (ISR); Andrej Franulović (CRO)
25 January 2022; 19:00 (CET)	Report	Kholod 3	Goals	three players 3	Berlin; Referees: Matan Schwartz (ISR); Andrej Franulović (CRO)

==== Crvena zvezda v CN Marseille ====
25 January 2022; 20:00 (CET)	Report	Crvena zvezda (Serbia)	8–11	(France) CN Marseille	Marseille; Referees: Alessandro Severo (ITA); Gernot Häntschel (GER)
25 January 2022; 20:00 (CET)	Report	Score by quarters: 3–1, 4–3, 0–4, 1–3			Marseille; Referees: Alessandro Severo (ITA); Gernot Häntschel (GER)
25 January 2022; 20:00 (CET)	Report	Basara 3	Goals	Vukičević 5	Marseille; Referees: Alessandro Severo (ITA); Gernot Häntschel (GER)

==== Pro Recco v Jug AO Dubrovnik ====
25 January 2022; 21:00 (CET)	Report	Pro Recco (Italy)	10–0	(Croatia) Jug AO Dubrovnik	Recco

=== Matchday 9 ===
==== Spandau 04 v CN Marseille ====
8 February 2022; 19:00 (CET)	Report	Spandau 04 (Germany)	7–13	(France) CN Marseille	Berlin; Referees: David Gómez (ESP); Tamás Kovács Csatlós (HUN)
8 February 2022; 19:00 (CET)	Report	Score by quarters: 1–5, 4–1, 0–5, 2–2			Berlin; Referees: David Gómez (ESP); Tamás Kovács Csatlós (HUN)
8 February 2022; 19:00 (CET)	Report	Kholod 3	Goals	Bouet, Crousillat 3	Berlin; Referees: David Gómez (ESP); Tamás Kovács Csatlós (HUN)

==== OSC Budapest v Jug AO Dubrovnik ====
8 February 2022; 19:00 (CET)	Report	OSC Budapest (Hungary)	10–15	(Croatia) Jug AO Dubrovnik	Budapest; Referees: Georgios Stavridis (GRE); Raffaele Colombo (ITA)
8 February 2022; 19:00 (CET)	Report	Score by quarters: 2–3, 3–4, 1–4, 4–4			Budapest; Referees: Georgios Stavridis (GRE); Raffaele Colombo (ITA)
8 February 2022; 19:00 (CET)	Report	Vigvári 4	Goals	Argyropoulos 6	Budapest; Referees: Georgios Stavridis (GRE); Raffaele Colombo (ITA)

==== Crvena zvezda v Steaua București ====
8 February 2022; 20:00 (CET)	Report	Crvena zvezda (Serbia)	10–10	(Romania) Steaua București	Belgrade; Referees: Božo Đurašković (MNE); Oriol Jaumandreu (ESP)
8 February 2022; 20:00 (CET)	Report	Score by quarters: 3–3, 3–2, 3–2, 1–3			Belgrade; Referees: Božo Đurašković (MNE); Oriol Jaumandreu (ESP)
8 February 2022; 20:00 (CET)	Report	three players 2	Goals	four players 2	Belgrade; Referees: Božo Đurašković (MNE); Oriol Jaumandreu (ESP)

==== Pro Recco v Waspo 98 Hannover ====
8 February 2022; 21:00 (CET)	Report	Pro Recco (Italy)	18–3	(Germany) Waspo 98 Hannover	Recco; Referees: Várkonyi Gabriella (HUN); Pau Segurana (ESP)
8 February 2022; 21:00 (CET)	Report	Score by quarters: 5–0, 5–1, 3–1, 5–1			Recco; Referees: Várkonyi Gabriella (HUN); Pau Segurana (ESP)
8 February 2022; 21:00 (CET)	Report	three players 3	Goals	Muslim 2	Recco; Referees: Várkonyi Gabriella (HUN); Pau Segurana (ESP)

=== Matchday 10 ===
==== Waspo 98 Hannover v CN Marseille ====
22 February 2022; 17:00 (CET)	Report	Waspo 98 Hannover (Germany)	7–14	(France) CN Marseille	Hannover; Referees: Radosław Koryzna (POL); Georgios Stavridis (GRE)
22 February 2022; 17:00 (CET)	Report	Score by quarters: 2–2, 0–3, 4–6, 1–3			Hannover; Referees: Radosław Koryzna (POL); Georgios Stavridis (GRE)
22 February 2022; 17:00 (CET)	Report	Ćorušić 3	Goals	Crousillat, Prlainović 3	Hannover; Referees: Radosław Koryzna (POL); Georgios Stavridis (GRE)

==== Jug AO Dubrovnik v Crvena zvezda ====
22 February 2022; 19:00 (CET)	Report	Jug AO Dubrovnik (Croatia)	17–11	(Serbia) Crvena zvezda	Dubrovnik; Referees: Filippo Gomez (ITA); Hendrik Schopp (GER)
22 February 2022; 19:00 (CET)	Report	Score by quarters: 2–4, 6–2, 5–2, 4–3			Dubrovnik; Referees: Filippo Gomez (ITA); Hendrik Schopp (GER)
22 February 2022; 19:00 (CET)	Report	Papanastasiou 5	Goals	Basara, Gajić 3	Dubrovnik; Referees: Filippo Gomez (ITA); Hendrik Schopp (GER)

==== Steaua București v Spandau 04 ====
22 February 2022; 20:00 (EET)	Report	Steaua București (Romania)	5–16	(Germany) Spandau 04	Bucharest; Referees: Arkadiy Voevodin (RUS); Nikolaos Boudramis (GRE)
22 February 2022; 20:00 (EET)	Report	Score by quarters: 1–3, 1–3, 2–6, 1–4			Bucharest; Referees: Arkadiy Voevodin (RUS); Nikolaos Boudramis (GRE)
22 February 2022; 20:00 (EET)	Report	Oanta 2	Goals	three players 3	Bucharest; Referees: Arkadiy Voevodin (RUS); Nikolaos Boudramis (GRE)

==== Pro Recco v OSC Budapest ====
22 February 2022; 21:00 (CET)	Report	Pro Recco (Italy)	17–14	(Hungary) OSC Budapest	Recco; Referees: David Gómez (ESP); Vojin Putniković (SRB)
22 February 2022; 21:00 (CET)	Report	Score by quarters: 5–4, 4–2, 3–4, 5–4			Recco; Referees: David Gómez (ESP); Vojin Putniković (SRB)
22 February 2022; 21:00 (CET)	Report	Zalánki 6	Goals	Csacsovszky, Manhercz 4	Recco; Referees: David Gómez (ESP); Vojin Putniković (SRB)

=== Matchday 11 ===
==== Waspo 98 Hannover v Crvena zvezda ====
29 March 2022; 18:15 (CET)	Report	Waspo 98 Hannover (Germany)	14–11	(Serbia) Crvena zvezda	Hannover; Referees: David Gómez (ESP); Tamás Kovács Csatlós (HUN)
29 March 2022; 18:15 (CET)	Report	Score by quarters: 2–3, 5–2, 3–3, 4–3			Hannover; Referees: David Gómez (ESP); Tamás Kovács Csatlós (HUN)
29 March 2022; 18:15 (CET)	Report	Schütze 4	Goals	four players 2	Hannover; Referees: David Gómez (ESP); Tamás Kovács Csatlós (HUN)

==== CN Marseille v OSC Budapest ====
29 March 2022; 19:00 (CET)	Report	CN Marseille (France)	13–9	(Hungary) OSC Budapest	Marseille; Referees: Frank Ohme (GER); Matan Schwartz (ISR)
29 March 2022; 19:00 (CET)	Report	Score by quarters: 3–1, 3–2, 3–3, 4–3			Marseille; Referees: Frank Ohme (GER); Matan Schwartz (ISR)
29 March 2022; 19:00 (CET)	Report	Crousillat 5	Goals	three players 2	Marseille; Referees: Frank Ohme (GER); Matan Schwartz (ISR)

==== Jug AO Dubrovnik v Steaua București ====
29 March 2022; 19:00 (CET)	Report	Jug AO Dubrovnik (Croatia)	14–7	(Romania) Steaua București	Dubrovnik; Referees: Andreja Stanojević (SRB); Andreas Moiralis (GRE)
29 March 2022; 19:00 (CET)	Report	Score by quarters: 4–2, 3–0, 4–2, 3–3			Dubrovnik; Referees: Andreja Stanojević (SRB); Andreas Moiralis (GRE)
29 March 2022; 19:00 (CET)	Report	Žuvela 4	Goals	Dragomirescu, Georgescu 2	Dubrovnik; Referees: Andreja Stanojević (SRB); Andreas Moiralis (GRE)

==== Spandau 04 v Pro Recco ====
29 March 2022; 19:00 (CET)	Report	Spandau 04 (Germany)	6–11	(Italy) Pro Recco	Berlin; Referees: Stanko Ivanovski (MNE); Pascal Bouchez (FRA)
29 March 2022; 19:00 (CET)	Report	Score by quarters: 1–4, 1–2, 2–4, 2–1			Berlin; Referees: Stanko Ivanovski (MNE); Pascal Bouchez (FRA)
29 March 2022; 19:00 (CET)	Report	Strelezkij 2	Goals	Di Fulvio 3	Berlin; Referees: Stanko Ivanovski (MNE); Pascal Bouchez (FRA)

=== Matchday 12 ===
==== Jug AO Dubrovnik v Spandau 04 ====
8 April 2022; 19:00 (CET)	Report	Jug AO Dubrovnik (Croatia)	12–9	(Germany) Spandau 04	Dubrovnik; Referees: Oriol Jaumandreu (ESP); Gábor Vogel (HUN)
8 April 2022; 19:00 (CET)	Report	Score by quarters: 3–2, 4–3, 2–3, 3–1			Dubrovnik; Referees: Oriol Jaumandreu (ESP); Gábor Vogel (HUN)
8 April 2022; 19:00 (CET)	Report	five players 2	Goals	Kholod, Nikolaidis 3	Dubrovnik; Referees: Oriol Jaumandreu (ESP); Gábor Vogel (HUN)

==== CN Marseille v Steaua București ====
8 April 2022; 19:15 (CET)	Report	CN Marseille (France)	15–10	(Romania) Steaua București	Bucharest; Referees: Nenad Periš (CRO); Vojin Putniković (SRB)
8 April 2022; 19:15 (CET)	Report	Score by quarters: 4–2, 4–2, 4–4, 3–2			Bucharest; Referees: Nenad Periš (CRO); Vojin Putniković (SRB)
8 April 2022; 19:15 (CET)	Report	Crousillat 4	Goals	Fulea 3	Bucharest; Referees: Nenad Periš (CRO); Vojin Putniković (SRB)

==== OSC Budapest v Waspo 98 Hannover ====
8 April 2022; 19:30 (CET)	Report	OSC Budapest (Hungary)	12–17	(Germany) Waspo 98 Hannover	Budapest; Referees: Radosław Koryzna (POL); Nikolaos Boudramis (GRE)
8 April 2022; 19:30 (CET)	Report	Score by quarters: 1–4, 4–5, 4–4, 3–4			Budapest; Referees: Radosław Koryzna (POL); Nikolaos Boudramis (GRE)
8 April 2022; 19:30 (CET)	Report	Vigvári 3	Goals	D. Brguljan, Nagaev 4	Budapest; Referees: Radosław Koryzna (POL); Nikolaos Boudramis (GRE)

==== Crvena zvezda v Pro Recco ====
8 April 2022; 20:00 (CET)	Report	Crvena zvezda (Serbia)	12–14	(Italy) Pro Recco	Belgrade; Referees: Rajmund Fodor (HUN); Jaume Teixidó (ESP)
8 April 2022; 20:00 (CET)	Report	Score by quarters: 3–6, 3–1, 4–3, 2–4			Belgrade; Referees: Rajmund Fodor (HUN); Jaume Teixidó (ESP)
8 April 2022; 20:00 (CET)	Report	Tankosić 3	Goals	Zalánki 4	Belgrade; Referees: Rajmund Fodor (HUN); Jaume Teixidó (ESP)

=== Matchday 13 ===
==== OSC Budapest v Crvena zvezda ====
19 April 2022; 19:00 (CET)	Report	OSC Budapest (Hungary)	13–9	(Serbia) Crvena zvezda	Budapest; Referees: Dragan Štampalija (CRO); Andreas Moiralis (GRE)
19 April 2022; 19:00 (CET)	Report	Score by quarters: 2–1, 3–3, 4–2, 4–3			Budapest; Referees: Dragan Štampalija (CRO); Andreas Moiralis (GRE)
19 April 2022; 19:00 (CET)	Report	Burián 3	Goals	Pješivac, Tankosić 2	Budapest; Referees: Dragan Štampalija (CRO); Andreas Moiralis (GRE)

==== Steaua București v Pro Recco ====
19 April 2022; 20:00 (EET)	Report	Steaua București (Romania)	3–14	(Italy) Pro Recco	Bucharest; Referees: György Kun (HUN); Gernot Häntschel (GER)
19 April 2022; 20:00 (EET)	Report	Score by quarters: 0–5, 2–3, 0–2, 1–4			Bucharest; Referees: György Kun (HUN); Gernot Häntschel (GER)
19 April 2022; 20:00 (EET)	Report	Vancsik 2	Goals	Figlioli 3	Bucharest; Referees: György Kun (HUN); Gernot Häntschel (GER)

==== CN Marseille v Jug AO Dubrovnik ====
19 April 2022; 19:30 (CET)	Report	CN Marseille (France)	12–13	(Croatia) Jug AO Dubrovnik	Marseille; Referees: Filippo Gomez (ITA); Tamás Kovács Csatlós (HUN)
19 April 2022; 19:30 (CET)	Report	Score by quarters: 2–3, 0–2, 3–3, 7–5			Marseille; Referees: Filippo Gomez (ITA); Tamás Kovács Csatlós (HUN)
19 April 2022; 19:30 (CET)	Report	Prlainović 4	Goals	Fatović, Joković 3	Marseille; Referees: Filippo Gomez (ITA); Tamás Kovács Csatlós (HUN)

==== Waspo 98 Hannover v Spandau 04 ====
20 April 2022; 18:15 (CET)	Report	Waspo 98 Hannover (Germany)	10–9	(Germany) Spandau 04	Hannover; Referees: Adrian T. Alexandrescu (ROU); Jaume Teixidó (ESP)
20 April 2022; 18:15 (CET)	Report	Score by quarters: 2–4, 4–2, 2–0, 2–3			Hannover; Referees: Adrian T. Alexandrescu (ROU); Jaume Teixidó (ESP)
20 April 2022; 18:15 (CET)	Report	Radović 3	Goals	Kholod 3	Hannover; Referees: Adrian T. Alexandrescu (ROU); Jaume Teixidó (ESP)

=== Matchday 14 ===
==== Waspo 98 Hannover v Jug AO Dubrovnik ====
10 May 2022; 18:15 (CET)	Report	Waspo 98 Hannover (Germany)	14–14	(Croatia) Jug AO Dubrovnik	Hannover; Referees: Andreja Stanojević (SRB); Gábor Vogel (HUN)
10 May 2022; 18:15 (CET)	Report	Score by quarters: 4–5, 6–3, 3–2, 1–4			Hannover; Referees: Andreja Stanojević (SRB); Gábor Vogel (HUN)
10 May 2022; 18:15 (CET)	Report	Radović 3	Goals	Papanastasiou, Žuvela 4	Hannover; Referees: Andreja Stanojević (SRB); Gábor Vogel (HUN)

==== Pro Recco v CN Marseille ====
10 May 2022; 19:00 (CET)	Report	Pro Recco (Italy)	11–8	(France) CN Marseille	Recco; Referees: Nenad Periš (CRO); Tamás Kovács Csatlós (HUN)
10 May 2022; 19:00 (CET)	Report	Score by quarters: 3–3, 5–0, 1–4, 2–1			Recco; Referees: Nenad Periš (CRO); Tamás Kovács Csatlós (HUN)
10 May 2022; 19:00 (CET)	Report	Zalánki 4	Goals	Crousillat, Prlainović 3	Recco; Referees: Nenad Periš (CRO); Tamás Kovács Csatlós (HUN)

==== Spandau 04 v Crvena zvezda ====
10 May 2022; 19:00 (CET)	Report	Spandau 04 (Germany)	11–12	(Serbia) Crvena zvezda	Berlin; Referees: Gabriella Várkonyi (HUN); Pascal Bouchez (FRA)
10 May 2022; 19:00 (CET)	Report	Score by quarters: 2–3, 3–3, 4–3, 2–3			Berlin; Referees: Gabriella Várkonyi (HUN); Pascal Bouchez (FRA)
10 May 2022; 19:00 (CET)	Report	Dedović 3	Goals	Subotić 4	Berlin; Referees: Gabriella Várkonyi (HUN); Pascal Bouchez (FRA)

==== Steaua București v OSC Budapest ====
10 May 2022; 20:00 (EET)	Report	Steaua București (Romania)	9–15	(Hungary) OSC Budapest	Bucharest; Referees: Pau Segurana (ESP); Alessandro Severo (ITA)
10 May 2022; 20:00 (EET)	Report	Score by quarters: 2–3, 1–3, 4–5, 2–4			Bucharest; Referees: Pau Segurana (ESP); Alessandro Severo (ITA)
10 May 2022; 20:00 (EET)	Report	Neamtu 4	Goals	Manhercz 3	Bucharest; Referees: Pau Segurana (ESP); Alessandro Severo (ITA)
