= 김길환 =

김길환 may refer to individuals whose name can be romanized by Revised Romanization of Korean or McCune–Reischauer:

- Kim Gil-hwan (born 1966), South Korean water polo player
- Kim Kil Whan, character in the animated series Adventure Time
