= Emanuela Viola =

Italian swimmer

Personal information
- Born: 12 January 1972 (age 54)

Sport
- Sport: Swimming
Medal record
Representing Italy
Mediterranean Games
Bronze medal – third place	1987 Latakia	100m butterfly

Emanuela Viola (born 12 January 1972) is an Italian swimmer. She competed in the women's 100 metre butterfly at the 1988 Summer Olympics.
