= Charalambos Papanikolaou =

Greek swimmer

Personal information
- Born: 22 May 1969 (age 57)

Sport
- Sport: Swimming
- Strokes: Backstroke, individual medley
Medal record
Men's swimming
Representing Greece
Mediterranean Games
Silver medal – second place	1987 Latakia	100 m backstroke
Silver medal – second place	1987 Latakia	200 m backstroke
Silver medal – second place	1991 Athens	400 m medley
Bronze medal – third place	1987 Latakia	400 m medley
Bronze medal – third place	1991 Athens	200 m medley

Charalambos Papanikolaou (Greek: Χαράλαμπος Παπανικολάου; born 22 May 1969) is a Greek swimmer. He competed in four events at the 1988 Summer Olympics. He was named the 1985 Greek Male Athlete of the Year.
