= 2021–22 LEN Champions League =

Water polo sports season

- League: LEN Champions League
- Sport: Water Polo
- Duration: 22 September 2021–4 June 2022
- Season MVP: (Italy) Francesco Di Fulvio (Pro Recco)
- Top scorer: (Hungary) Gergő Zalánki 42 goals (Pro Recco)

Final 8
- Champions: (Italy) Pro Recco (10th title)
- Runners-up: (Serbia) Novi Beograd
- Finals MVP: (Italy) Giacomo Cannella (Pro Recco)

Champions League seasons
- ← 2020–21 2022–23 →

The 2021–22 LEN Champions League was the 59th edition of LEN's premier competition for men's water polo clubs.

== Teams ==
Preliminary round
(Germany) Spandau 04	(France) CN Marseille	(Romania) Steaua București
(Germany) Waspo 98 Hannover	(Georgia (country)) Dinamo Tbilisi	(Spain) Zodiac CNA Barceloneta
(Serbia) Novi Beograd	(Greece) Olympiacos	
(Serbia) Radnički Kragujevac	(Hungary) FTC Telekom	
(Croatia) Jug AO Dubrovnik	(Italy) Pro Recco	

Qualification round II
(Croatia) Mladost Zagreb	(Hungary) Szolnok VSC	(Spain) CN Barcelona
(France) CN Noisy-le-Sec	(Italy) AN Brescia	(Serbia) Crvena zvezda
(Greece) NC Vouliagmeni	(Romania) CSM Oradea	

Qualification round I
(Montenegro) Jadran Herceg Novi	(Hungary) OSC Budapest	(Russia) Sintez Kazan
(Montenegro) Primorac Kotor	(Italy) RN Savona	(Spain) CN Terrassa
(Croatia) Jadran Split	(Lithuania) EVK Žaibas	(Turkey) Enka Istanbul
(France) Montpellier	(Poland) AZS Warsaw	
(Greece) Apollon Smyrnis	(Portugal) Vitória Sport Clube	

== Schedule ==
The schedule of the competition is as follows.

Phase	Round	1st leg	2nd leg
Qualifying rounds	Qualification round I	24–26 September 2021	
Qualifying rounds	Qualification round II	8–10 October 2021	
Qualifying rounds	Qualification round III	16 October 2021	20 October 2021
Preliminary round	Round 1	26/27 October 2021	
Preliminary round	Round 2	9/10 November 2021	
Preliminary round	Round 3	19/20 November 2021	
Preliminary round	Round 4	30 November/1 December 2021	
Preliminary round	Round 5	14/15 December 2021	
Preliminary round	Round 6	21/22 December 2021	
Preliminary round	Round 7	11/12 January 2022	
Preliminary round	Round 8	25/26 January 2022	
Preliminary round	Round 9	8/9 February 2022	
Preliminary round	Round 10	22/23 February 2022	
Preliminary round	Round 11	29/30 March 2022	
Preliminary round	Round 12	8/9 April 2022	
Preliminary round	Round 13	19/20 April 2022	
Preliminary round	Round 14	10/11 May 2022	
Final 8	Quarterfinals	2 June 2022	
Final 8	Semifinals	3 June 2022	
Final 8	Final	4 June 2022	

== Qualifying rounds ==
=== Qualification round I ===
The draw took place in Šibenik during the women's LEN European Junior Water Polo Championship. The top four ranked sides will advance from both groups.

==== Group A ====
- 23–26 September 2021, Savona, Italy.

Pos	Team	Pld	W	D	L	GF	GA	GD	Pts	Qualification	(Italy) RNS	(France) MON	(Spain) CNT	(Montenegro) PRI	(Portugal) VIT	(Poland) AZS
1	(Italy) RN Savona	5	4	0	1	88	41	+47	12	Round II	—	9–10	13–12	11–9	26–6	29–4
2	(France) Montpellier	5	3	2	0	60	41	+19	11	Round II	—	—	—	11–11	17–9	—
3	(Spain) CN Terrassa	5	3	1	1	71	38	+33	10	Round II	—	12–12	—	11–8	—	—
4	(Montenegro) Primorac Kotor	5	2	1	2	68	43	+25	7	Round II	—	—	—	—	18–6	22–4
5	(Portugal) Vitória Sport Clube	5	1	0	4	38	84	−46	3		—	—	0–10^{DSQ}	—	—	17–13
6	(Poland) AZS Warsaw	5	0	0	5	26	104	−78	0		—	0–10^{DSQ}	5–26	—	—	—

Source: LEN

==== Group B ====
- 22–26 September 2021, Podgorica, Montenegro.

Pos	Team	Pld	W	D	L	GF	GA	GD	Pts	Qualification	(Hungary) OSC	(Croatia) JST	(Montenegro) JHN	(Greece) APO	(Russia) SIN	(Turkey) ESK	(Lithuania) ŽAI
1	(Hungary) OSC Budapest	6	6	0	0	94	55	+39	18	Round II	—	14–9	—	15–8	15–12	17–11	—
2	(Croatia) Jadran Split	6	5	0	1	97	63	+34	15	Round II	—	—	—	—	14–11	—	18–6
3	(Montenegro) Jadran Herceg Novi	6	4	0	2	85	55	+30	12	Round II	9–12	10–15	—	14–8	12–6	15–5	25–9
4	(Greece) Apollon Smyrnis	6	3	0	3	78	78	0	9	Round II	—	11–19	—	—	18–15	—	21–6
5	(Russia) Sintez Kazan	6	2	0	4	75	72	+3	6		—	—	—	—	—	12–6	—
6	(Turkey) Enka Istanbul	6	1	0	5	60	87	−27	3		—	11–22	—	9–12	—	—	—
7	(Lithuania) EVK Žaibas	6	0	0	6	43	122	−79	0		6–21	—	—	—	7–19	9–18	—

Source: LEN

=== Qualification round II ===
The top two ranked sides from each group advance.

==== Group C ====
- 8–10 October 2021, Szolnok, Hungary.

Pos	Team	Pld	W	D	L	GF	GA	GD	Pts	Qualification	(Hungary) SZO	(Italy) RNS	(Greece) NCV	(Montenegro) JHN
1	(Hungary) Szolnok VSC	3	2	1	0	37	34	+3	7	Round III	—	13–13	13–12	11–9
2	(Italy) RN Savona	3	0	3	0	34	34	0	3	Round III	—	—	—	11–11
3	(Greece) NC Vouliagmeni	3	0	2	1	33	34	−1	2		—	10–10	—	—
4	(Montenegro) Jadran Herceg Novi	3	0	2	1	31	33	−2	2		—	—	11–11	—

Source: LEN

==== Group D ====
- 8–10 October 2021, Zagreb, Croatia.

Pos	Team	Pld	W	D	L	GF	GA	GD	Pts	Qualification	(Serbia) CZB	(Croatia) MZG	(Greece) APO	(France) MON
1	(Serbia) Crvena zvezda	3	2	0	1	33	24	+9	6 (Note: Crvena zvezda 2 Pts, +5 GD; Mladost Zagreb 2 Pts, 0 GD; Apollon Smyrnis 2 Pts, −5 GD)	Round III	—	—	14–8	11–7
2	(Croatia) Mladost Zagreb	3	2	0	1	28	25	+3	6	Round III	9–8	—	9–10	10–7
3	(Greece) Apollon Smyrnis	3	2	0	1	33	37	−4	6		—	—	—	—
4	(France) Montpellier	3	0	0	3	28	36	−8	0		—	—	14–15	—

Source: LEN

==== Group E ====
- 8–10 October 2021, Paris, France.

Pos	Team	Pld	W	D	L	GF	GA	GD	Pts	Qualification	(Italy) BRE	(Hungary) OSC	(France) NLS	(Spain) CNT
1	(Italy) AN Brescia	3	2	1	0	35	28	+7	7	Round III	—	10–10	—	—
2	(Hungary) OSC Budapest	3	2	1	0	28	24	+4	7	Round III	—	—	—	8–7
3	(France) CN Noisy-le-Sec	3	1	0	2	31	32	−1	3		11–16	7–10	—	13–6
4	(Spain) CN Terrassa	3	0	0	3	20	30	−10	0		7–9	—	—	—

Source: LEN

==== Group F ====
- 8–10 October 2021, Split, Croatia.

Pos	Team	Pld	W	D	L	GF	GA	GD	Pts	Qualification	(Croatia) JST	(Spain) CNB	(Montenegro) PRI	(Romania) ORA
1	(Croatia) Jadran Split	3	3	0	0	42	19	+23	9	Round III	—	8–4	16–7	—
2	(Spain) CN Barcelona	3	2	0	1	33	24	+9	6	Round III	—	—	14–10	15–6
3	(Montenegro) Primorac Kotor	3	1	0	2	25	36	−11	3		—	—	—	8–6
4	(Romania) CSM Oradea	3	0	0	3	20	41	−21	0		8–18	—	—	—

Source: LEN

=== Qualification round III ===
The winners in the third round will continue in the preliminary round. The losers in the third round will be transferred in the Euro Cup quarter-finals.

Team 1	Agg.	Team 2	1st leg	2nd leg
Jadran Split (Croatia)	21–10	(Croatia) Mladost Zagreb	14–7	7–3
Szolnok VSC (Hungary)	18–25	(Hungary) OSC Budapest	6–15	12–10
RN Savona (Italy)	19–20	(Serbia) Crvena zvezda	8–9	11–11
CN Barcelona (Spain)	26–33	(Italy) AN Brescia	13–17	13–16

== Preliminary round ==
Location of teams of the 2021–22 LEN Champions League preliminary round.

The draw for the 2021–22 LEN Champions League preliminary round took place in Ostia, Italy. The upcoming season is planned with the usual pre-pandemic round-robin format with 14 rounds contested on a home-and-away basis. The top three teams in group A and the top four teams in group B will advance to the Final 8. Also, Novi Beograd will participate in the Final 8 as the host of tournament. The matchdays will be from 26 October 2021 to 15 June 2022.

=== Group A ===
Pos	Team	Pld	W	D	L	GF	GA	GD	Pts	Qualification	BRE	FTC	NBG	BAR	OLY	RKG	JST	DTB
1	(Italy) AN Brescia	14	9	3	2	162	133	+29	30	Final 8	—	8–8	13–16	14–12	8–7	12–8	6–5	16–8
2	(Hungary) FTC Telekom	14	8	4	2	154	138	+16	28	Final 8	8–6	—	11–10	7–17	9–9	13–12	14–8	16–10
3	(Serbia) Novi Beograd (Note: Novi Beograd is already qualified as the Final 8 host.)	14	8	3	3	188	149	+39	27 (Note: Novi Beograd 23–21 (Agg.) Zodiac CNA Barceloneta)	Final 8	11–11	11–14	—	11–9	9–12	16–10	14–7	19–7
4	(Spain) Zodiac CNA Barceloneta	14	8	3	3	173	121	+52	27	Final 8	12–12	12–12	12–12	—	9–5	13–7	11–6	18–4
5	(Greece) Olympiacos	14	6	2	6	146	131	+15	20		5–8	8–10	12–12	8–4	—	11–7	12–10	20–9
6	(Serbia) Radnički Kragujevac	14	4	1	9	139	159	−20	13		8–14	11–11	11–13	3–9	10–8	—	13–10	14–7
7	(Croatia) Jadran Split	14	3	0	11	141	173	−32	9		14–15	9–7	12–17	13–15	12–16	9–8	—	15–13
8	(Georgia (country)) Dinamo Tbilisi	14	2	0	12	130	229	−99	6		11–19	7–14	8–17	7–20	14–13	13–17	12–11	—

Source: LEN

=== Group B ===
Pos	Team	Pld	W	D	L	GF	GA	GD	Pts	Qualification	REC	CNM	JUG	HAN	OSC	BER	CZB	STE
1	(Italy) Pro Recco	14	13	0	1	200	100	+100	39	Final 8	—	11–8	10–0^{w/o}	18–3	17–14	14–9	13–7	23–5
2	(France) CN Marseille	14	11	0	3	170	119	+51	33	Final 8	7–13	—	12–13	13–10	13–9	12–7	10–0^{w/o}	15–10
3	(Croatia) Jug AO Dubrovnik	14	10	1	3	174	143	+31	31	Final 8	11–8	9–14	—	13–7	11–12	12–9	17–11	14–7
4	(Germany) Waspo 98 Hannover	14	6	3	5	150	180	−30	21	Final 8	7–20	7–14	14–14	—	12–12	10–9	14–11	13–12
5	(Hungary) OSC Budapest	14	6	1	7	151	168	−17	19		8–14	9–14	10–15	12–17	—	0–10^{w/o}	13–9	14–8
6	(Germany) Spandau 04	14	3	1	10	133	148	−15	10		6–11	7–13	8–16	11–11	11–12	—	11–12	10–8
7	(Serbia) Crvena zvezda	14	2	1	11	133	178	−45	7		12–14	8–11	13–19	12–15	8–11	12–9	—	10–10
8	(Romania) Steaua București	14	1	1	12	111	186	−75	4		3–14	6–14	8–10	9–10	9–15	5–16	11–8	—

Source: LEN

== Final 8 ==
Location of the 2021–22 LEN Champions League Final 8

Quarterfinals
2 June
(Italy) AN Brescia	12
(Germany) Waspo 98 Hannover	5
2 June
(France) CN Marseille	10
(Serbia) Novi Beograd	16
2 June
(Italy) Pro Recco	11
(Spain) Zodiac CNAB	10
2 June
(Hungary) FTC Telekom	14
(Croatia) Jug AO Dubrovnik	13

Semifinals
3 June
(Italy) AN Brescia	13
(Serbia) Novi Beograd	14
3 June
(Italy) Pro Recco	10
(Hungary) FTC Telekom	7

Final
4 June
(Serbia) Novi Beograd	16
(Italy) Pro Recco (PSO)	17
Third place game
4 June
(Italy) AN Brescia	12
(Hungary) FTC Telekom	14

5th–8th place bracket

5th–8th place semifinals
3 June
(Germany) Waspo 98 Hannover	11
(France) CN Marseille	9
3 June
(Spain) Zodiac CNAB	12
(Croatia) Jug AO Dubrovnik	9

Fifth place game
4 June
(Germany) Waspo 98 Hannover	10
(Spain) Zodiac CNAB	12
Seventh place game
4 June
(France) CN Marseille	15
(Croatia) Jug AO Dubrovnik	13

2021–22 LEN Champions League
Champions

Pro Recco
10th title

Marco Del Lungo, Francesco Di Fulvio, Luka Loncar, Gergő Zalánki, Aaron Younger, Alessandro Velotto, Nicholas Presciutti, Gonzalo Echenique, Aleksandar Ivović, Benjamin Thomas, Matteo Aicardi, Stefano Luongo, Tommaso Negri

Head coach Sandro Sukno

== Awards ==
Season MVP	Top Scorer	Finals MVP
(Italy) Francesco Di Fulvio (Pro Recco)	(Hungary) Gergő Zalánki 42 goals (Pro Recco)	(Italy) Giacomo Cannella (Pro Recco)

Total 7 of the Season
LW	(Italy) Francesco Di Fulvio (Pro Recco)	CF	(Serbia) Duško Pijetlović (Novi Beograd)	RW	(Hungary) Gergő Zalánki (Pro Recco)
LD	(Spain) Álvaro Granados (Novi Beograd)	CB	(Montenegro) Aleksandar Ivović (Pro Recco)	RD	(Serbia) Dušan Mandić (Novi Beograd)
GK	(Italy) Marco Del Lungo (Pro Recco)				

== See also ==
- 2021–22 LEN Euro Cup
