= Natalia Autric =

Spanish swimmer

Personal information
- Born: 29 December 1964 (age 61)

Sport
- Sport: Swimming
Medal record
Representing Spain
Mediterranean Games
| Bronze medal – third place | 1987 Latakia | 100m backstroke |

Natalia Autric (born 29 December 1964) is a Spanish former swimmer who competed in the 1988 Summer Olympics.
