= David Leblanc =

French swimmer

Personal information
- Born: 31 July 1968 (age 57) Dijon, France

Sport
- Sport: Swimming

David Leblanc (born 31 July 1968) is a retired French breaststroke swimmer. He competed in three events at the 1988 Summer Olympics.
