= Dirk Jacoby =

German water polo player

Personal information
- Nationality: German
- Born: 21 March 1962 (age 62); Kamen, West Germany

Sport
- Sport: Water polo

Dirk Jacoby (born 21 March 1962) is a German former water polo player. He competed in the men's tournament at the 1988 Summer Olympics.
