= Jacqueline Delord =

French swimmer (born 1970)

Personal information
- Born: January 29, 1970 (age 56) Toulouse, Haute-Garonne, France

Sport
- Sport: Swimming
- Strokes: Freestyle, butterfly
Medal record
Representing France
Mediterranean Games
Gold medal – first place	1987 Latakia	100m butterfly
Gold medal – first place	1993 Languedoc-Roussillon	4×100m freestyle
Bronze medal – third place	1987 Latakia	100m freestyle
Bronze medal – third place	1987 Latakia	200m individual medlay

Jacqueline Delord (born 29 January 1970) is a French former swimmer who competed in the 1988 Summer Olympics, in the 1992 Summer Olympics, and in the 1996 Summer Olympics.

She competed at the Mediterranean Games in 1987, where she won a gold medal in the 100m butterfly event and bronze medals in the 100m freestyle and 200 individual medlay events, and in 1993, where she won a gold medal in the 4×100m freestyle event.
