= Christine Magnier =

French swimmer

Personal information
- Born: 31 October 1968 (age 57) Villeparisis, France

Sport
- Sport: Swimming

Christine Magnier (born 31 October 1968) is a French swimmer. She competed in two events at the 1988 Summer Olympics.
