= Virginie Bojaryn =

French swimmer

Personal information
- Born: 3 August 1971 (age 54) Charleville-Mézières, France

Sport
- Sport: Swimming
Medal record
Representing France
Mediterranean Games
Silver medal – second place	1987 Latakia	100m backstroke
Bronze medal – third place	1987 Latakia	200m backstroke
Bronze medal – third place	1991 Athens	4x100m medley relay

Virginie Bojaryn (born 3 August 1971) is a French breaststroke swimmer. She competed in two events at the 1988 Summer Olympics.
