= Renaud Boucher =

French swimmer

Personal information
- Born: 7 August 1964 (age 61) Toulouse, France

Sport
- Sport: Swimming
Medal record
Representing France
Mediterranean Games
Bronze medal – third place	1987 Latakia	100m backstroke

Renaud Boucher (born 7 August 1964) is a French swimmer. He competed in the men's 100 metre backstroke at the 1988 Summer Olympics.
