= Jean-Baptiste Martzluff =

French volleyball player (born 1958)

Personal information
- Nationality: French
- Born: 26 October 1958 (age 66)

Sport
- Sport: Volleyball

Jean-Baptiste Martzluff (born 26 October 1958) is a French volleyball player. He competed in the men's tournament at the 1988 Summer Olympics.
