= Ludovic Depickère =

French swimmer

Personal information
- Born: July 29, 1969 (age 56) Wattrelos, Nord, France

Sport
- Sport: Swimming

Ludovic Depickère (born 29 July 1969) is a retired butterfly and freestyle swimmer from France, who represented his native country at three consecutive Summer Olympics, starting in 1988. He was affiliated with a club called Dauphins Wattrelos.
