= Pascaline Louvrier =

French swimmer

Personal information
- Born: 28 September 1971 (age 54) Charleville-Mézières, France

Sport
- Sport: Swimming

Pascaline Louvrier (born 28 September 1971) is a French swimmer. She competed in three events at the 1988 Summer Olympics.
