= Franck Iacono =

French swimmer

Personal information
- Full name: Franck Iacono
- Nationality: French
- Born: 14 June 1966 (age 60) Antibes, Alpes-Maritimes
- Height: 1.84 m (6 ft 0 in)

Sport
- Sport: Swimming
- Strokes: Freestyle
- Club: Racing Club de France
- College team: University of Alabama

Franck Iacono (born 14 June 1966 in Antibes, Alpes-Maritimes) is a retired freestyle swimmer from France. He competed at two consecutive Summer Olympics for his native country, starting in 1984. He was affiliated with the University of Alabama (1984).
