= Laurent Neuville =

French swimmer

Personal information
- Born: 15 July 1965 (age 60) Paris, France
- Height: 1.94 m (6 ft 4 in)
- Weight: 80 kg (176 lb)

Sport
- Sport: Swimming
- Club: CA Orsay/Racing Club de France
Medal record
Representing France
European Championships
Silver medal – second place	1989 Bonn	4×100 m freestyle
Mediterranean Games
Silver medal – second place	1987 Latakia	100m freestyle

Laurent Neuville (born 15 July 1965) is a French swimmer who won a silver medal in the 4 × 100 m freestyle at the 1989 European Aquatics Championships. He finished sixth and fourth in the same event at the 1984 and 1988 Summer Olympics, respectively. Individually, he won a silver medal in the 100 m freestyle at the 1987 Mediterranean Games.

After retirement from senior swimming he was competing in the masters category and set world records in freestyle events. In 2012, he tried to revive the swimming race through Paris.
