= Pascal Perot =

French water polo player (born 1964)

Personal information
- Nationality: French
- Born: 8 January 1964 (age 62) Sainte-Adresse, France

Sport
- Sport: Water polo

Pascal Perot (born 8 January 1964) is a French water polo player. He competed in the men's tournament at the 1988 Summer Olympics.
