= Bruno Boyadjian =

French water polo player (born 1958)

Personal information
- Nationality: French
- Born: 15 November 1958 (age 66); Valence, France

Sport
- Sport: Water polo

Bruno Boyadjian (born 15 November 1958) is a French water polo player. He competed in the men's tournament at the 1988 Summer Olympics.
