= Kim Seong-eun (water polo) =

South Korean water polo player

Personal information
- Nationality: South Korean
- Born: 9 July 1967 (age 57)

Sport
- Sport: Water polo

Kim Seong-eun (born 9 July 1967) is a South Korean water polo player. He competed in the men's tournament at the 1988 Summer Olympics.
