= Nicolas Marischael =

French water polo player (born 1964)

Personal information
- Nationality: French
- Born: 10 August 1964 (age 60); Limoges, France

Sport
- Sport: Water polo

Nicolas Marischael (born 10 August 1964) is a French water polo player. He competed in the men's tournament at the 1988 Summer Olympics.
