= Marc Brisfer =

French water polo player (born 1956)

Personal information
- Nationality: French
- Born: 8 May 1956 (age 69); Tourcoing, France

Sport
- Sport: Water polo

Marc Brisfer (born 8 May 1956) is a French water polo player. He competed in the men's tournament at the 1988 Summer Olympics.
