= Michel Idoux =

French water polo player (born 1953)

Personal information
- Nationality: French
- Born: 31 October 1953 (age 71); Marseille, France

Sport
- Sport: Water polo

Michel Idoux (born 31 October 1953) is a French water polo player. He competed in the men's tournament at the 1988 Summer Olympics.
