= Arnaud Bouet =

French water polo player (born 1960)

Personal information
- Nationality: French
- Born: 15 February 1960 (age 65); Paris, France

Sport
- Sport: Water polo

Arnaud Bouet (born 15 February 1960) is a French former water polo player. He competed in the men's tournament at the 1988 Summer Olympics.

== See also ==
- France men's Olympic water polo team records and statistics
- List of men's Olympic water polo tournament goalkeepers
