= Kim Gil-hwan =

South Korean water polo player

Personal information
- Full name: 김길환
- Nationality: South Korean
- Born: 12 March 1966 (age 59)

Sport
- Sport: Water polo

Kim Gil-hwan (Korean: 김길환; born 12 March 1966) is a South Korean water polo player. He competed in the men's tournament at the 1988 Summer Olympics.
