= Christophe Bordeau =

French swimmer

Personal information
- Born: 3 August 1968 (age 57) Tours, Indre-et-Loire, France
Medal record
Men's swimming
Representing France
European Championships (LC)
Bronze medal – third place	1991 Athens	200 m butterfly
Bronze medal – third place	1993 Sheffield	4×200 m freestyle
Mediterranean Games
Gold medal – first place	1987 Latakia	200 m butterfly
Gold medal – first place	1991 Athens	200 m butterfly
Gold medal – first place	1993 Narbonne	200 m freestyle

Christophe Bordeau (born 3 August 1968 in Tours, Indre-et-Loire) is a retired butterfly and freestyle swimmer from France, who represented his native country at three consecutive Summer Olympics, starting in 1988. He won two bronze medals in the early 1990s at the European Long Course Championships.
