= Thierry Alimondo =

French water polo player (born 1963)

Personal information
- Nationality: French
- Born: 22 July 1963 (age 61); Antony, France

Sport
- Sport: Water polo

Thierry Alimondo (born 22 July 1963) is a French water polo player. He competed at the 1988 Summer Olympics and the 1992 Summer Olympics.
