= Christian Volpi =

French water polo player (born 1965)

Personal information
- Nationality: French
- Born: 25 May 1965 (age 59); Bourgoin-Jallieu, France

Sport
- Sport: Water polo

Christian Volpi (born 25 May 1965) is a French former water polo player. He competed in the men's tournament at the 1988 Summer Olympics.

== See also ==
- France men's Olympic water polo team records and statistics
- List of men's Olympic water polo tournament goalkeepers
