= Michel Crousillat =

French water polo player (born 1962)

Personal information
- Nationality: French
- Born: 15 January 1962 (age 63); Marseille, France

Sport
- Sport: Water polo

Michel Crousillat (born 15 January 1962) is a French former water polo player. He competed in the men's tournament at the 1988 Summer Olympics.
