= Marc Crousillat =

French water polo player (1960–2022)

Personal information
- Nationality: French
- Born: 17 January 1960; Marseille, France
- Died: 22 January 2022 (aged 62); Marseille, France

Sport
- Sport: Water polo

Marc Crousillat (17 January 1960 – 22 January 2022) was a French water polo player. He competed in the men's tournament at the 1988 Summer Olympics. He died in Marseille on 22 January 2022, at the age of 62.
