= List of 1992 Summer Olympics medal winners =

The 1992 Summer Olympics were held in Barcelona, Spain from July 25 to August 9.

== Aquatics ==
=== Diving ===
Event	Gold	Silver	Bronze
Men's 3 m springboard	Mark Lenzi; United States	Tan Liangde; China	Dmitri Sautin; Unified Team
Women's 3 m springboard	Gao Min; China	Irina Lashko; Unified Team	Brita Baldus; Germany
Men's 10 m platform	Sun Shuwei; China	Scott Donie; United States	Xiong Ni; China
Women's 10 m platform	Fu Mingxia; China	Yelena Miroshina; Unified Team	Mary Ellen Clark; United States

=== Swimming ===
Event	Gold	Silver	Bronze
Men's 50 metre freestyle	Alexander Popov; Unified Team	Matt Biondi; United States	Tom Jager; United States
Women's 50 metre freestyle	Yang Wenyi; China	Zhuang Yong; China	Angel Martino; United States
Men's 100 metre freestyle	Alexander Popov; Unified Team	Gustavo Borges; Brazil	Stéphan Caron; France
Women's 100 metre freestyle	Zhuang Yong; China	Jenny Thompson; United States	Franziska van Almsick; Germany
Men's 200 metre freestyle	Yevgeny Sadovyi; Unified Team	Anders Holmertz; Sweden	Antti Kasvio; Finland
Women's 200 metre freestyle	Nicole Haislett; United States	Franziska van Almsick; Germany	Kerstin Kielgass; Germany
Men's 400 metre freestyle	Yevgeny Sadovyi; Unified Team	Kieren Perkins; Australia	Anders Holmertz; Sweden
Women's 400 metre freestyle	Dagmar Hase; Germany	Janet Evans; United States	Hayley Lewis; Australia
Women's 800 metre freestyle	Janet Evans; United States	Hayley Lewis; Australia	Jana Henke; Germany
Men's 1500 metre freestyle	Kieren Perkins; Australia	Glen Housman; Australia	Jörg Hoffmann; Germany
Men's 100 metre backstroke	Mark Tewksbury; Canada	Jeff Rouse; United States	David Berkoff; United States
Women's 100 metre backstroke	Krisztina Egerszegi; Hungary	Tünde Szabó; Hungary	Lea Loveless; United States
Men's 200 metre backstroke	Martin López-Zubero; Spain	Vladimir Selkov; Unified Team	Stefano Battistelli; Italy
Women's 200 metre backstroke	Krisztina Egerszegi; Hungary	Dagmar Hase; Germany	Nicole Stevenson; Australia
Men's 100 metre breaststroke	Nelson Diebel; United States	Norbert Rózsa; Hungary	Phil Rogers; Australia
Women's 100 metre breaststroke	Yelena Rudkovskaya; Unified Team	Anita Nall; United States	Samantha Riley; Australia
Men's 200 metre breaststroke	Mike Barrowman; United States	Norbert Rózsa; Hungary	Nick Gillingham; Great Britain
Women's 200 metre breaststroke	Kyoko Iwasaki; Japan	Lin Li; China	Anita Nall; United States
Men's 100 metre butterfly	Pablo Morales; United States	Rafał Szukała; Poland	Anthony Nesty; Suriname
Women's 100 metre butterfly	Hong Qian; China	Crissy Ahmann-Leighton; United States	Catherine Plewinski; France
Men's 200 metre butterfly	Melvin Stewart; United States	Danyon Loader; New Zealand	Franck Esposito; France
Women's 200 metre butterfly	Summer Sanders; United States	Wang Xiaohong; China	Susie O'Neill; Australia
Men's 200 metre individual medley	Tamás Darnyi; Hungary	Greg Burgess; United States	Attila Czene; Hungary
Women's 200 metre individual medley	Lin Li; China	Summer Sanders; United States	Daniela Hunger; Germany
Men's 400 metre individual medley	Tamás Darnyi; Hungary	Eric Namesnik; United States	Luca Sacchi; Italy
Women's 400 metre individual medley	Krisztina Egerszegi; Hungary	Lin Li; China	Summer Sanders; United States
Men's 4 x 100 metre freestyle relay	United States; Joe Hudepohl; Matt Biondi; Tom Jager; Jon Olsen; Shaun Jordan*; Joel Thomas*	Unified Team; Pavlo Khnykin; Gennadiy Prigoda; Yuri Bashkatov; Alexander Popov; Vladimir Pyshnenko*; Veniamin Tayanovich*	Germany; Dirk Richter; Christian Tröger; Steffen Zesner; Mark Pinger; Andreas Szigat*; Bengt Zikarsky*
Women's 4 x 100 metre freestyle relay	United States; Nicole Haislett; Angel Martino; Jenny Thompson; Dara Torres; Ashley Tappin*; Crissy Ahmann-Leighton*	China; Le Jingyi; Lü Bin; Zhuang Yong; Yang Wenyi; Zhao Kun*	Germany; Franziska van Almsick; Daniela Hunger; Simone Osygus; Manuela Stellmach; Kerstin Kielgass*; Annette Hadding*
Men's 4 x 200 metre freestyle relay	Unified Team; Dmitry Lepikov; Vladimir Pyshnenko; Veniamin Tayanovich; Yevgeny Sadovyi; Aleksey Kudryavtsev*; Yury Mukhin*	Sweden; Christer Wallin; Anders Holmertz; Tommy Werner; Lars Frölander	United States; Joe Hudepohl; Melvin Stewart; Jon Olsen; Doug Gjertsen; Scott Jaffe*; Dan Jorgensen*
Men's 4 x 100 metre medley relay	United States; Jeff Rouse; Nelson Diebel; Pablo Morales; Jon Olsen; David Berkoff*; Hans Dersch*; Melvin Stewart*; Matt Biondi*	Unified Team; Vladimir Selkov; Vasili Ivanov; Pavlo Khnykin; Alexander Popov; Vladimir Pyshnenko*; Vladislav Kulikov*; Dmitri Volkov*	Canada; Mark Tewksbury; Jonathan Cleveland; Marcel Gery; Stephen Clarke; Tom Ponting*
Women's 4 x 100 metre medley relay	United States; Crissy Ahmann-Leighton; Lea Loveless; Anita Nall; Jenny Thompson; Janie Wagstaff*; Megan Kleine*; Summer Sanders*; Nicole Haislett*	Germany; Franziska van Almsick; Jana Dörries; Dagmar Hase; Daniela Hunger; Daniela Brendel*; Bettina Ustrowski*; Simone Osygus*	Unified Team; Nina Zhivanevskaya; Olga Kiritchenko; Natalya Meshcheryakova; Yelena Rudkovskaya; Elena Choubina*

* Swimmers who participated in the heats only and received medals.

=== Synchronized swimming ===
Event	Gold	Silver	Bronze
Women's solo	Kristen Babb-Sprague; United States	none	Fumiko Okuno; Japan
Women's solo	Sylvie Fréchette; Canada	none	Fumiko Okuno; Japan
Women's duet	United States; Karen Josephson; Sarah Josephson	Canada; Penny Vilagos; Vicky Vilagos	Japan; Fumiko Okuno; Aki Takayama

=== Water polo ===
Event	Gold	Silver	Bronze
Men's	Italy; Francesco Attolico; Alessandro Bovo; Alessandro Campagna; Paolo Caldarella; Massimiliano Ferretti; Giuseppe Porzio; Marco D'Altrui; Mario Fiorillo; Ferdinando Gandolfi; Amedeo Pomilio; Francesco Porzio; Carlo Silipo; Gianni Averaimo	Spain; Daniel Ballart; Jesús Rollán; Jordi Sans; Josep Picó; Manuel Estiarte; Manuel Silvestre; Marco Antonio González; Miguel Ángel Oca; Pedro Francisco García; Ricardo Sánchez; Rubén Michavila; Salvador Gómez; Sergi Pedrerol	Unified Team; Sergey Naumov; Alexandre Ogorodnikov; Alexandre Tchuguir; Dmitri Apanassenko; Andrei Belofastov; Evgueni Charonov; Dmitry Gorshkov; Vladimir Karaboutov; Aleksandr Kolotov; Alexandre Kovalenko; Nikolay Kozlov; Serguei Markotch; Alexei Vdovine

== Archery ==
Event	Gold	Silver	Bronze
Men's individual	Sébastien Flute; France	Chung Jae-Hun; South Korea	Simon Terry; Great Britain
Women's individual	Cho Youn-Jeong; South Korea	Kim Soo-Nyung; South Korea	Natalia Valeeva; Unified Team
Men's team	Spain; Juan Holgado; Alfonso Menéndez; Antonio Vázquez	Finland; Ismo Falck; Jari Lipponen; Tomi Poikolainen	Great Britain; Steven Hallard; Richard Priestman; Simon Terry
Women's team	South Korea; Cho Youn-Jeong; Kim Soo-Nyung; Lee Eun-Kyung	China; Ma Xiangjun; Wang Hong; Wang Xiaozhu	Unified Team; Lyudmila Arzhannikova; Khatouna Kvrivichvili; Natalia Valeeva

== Athletics ==
=== Track ===
Event	Gold	Silver	Bronze
Men's 100 m	Linford Christie; Great Britain	Frankie Fredericks; Namibia	Dennis Mitchell; United States
Women's 100 m	Gail Devers; United States	Juliet Cuthbert; Jamaica	Irina Privalova; Unified Team
Men's 200 m	Michael Marsh; United States	Frankie Fredericks; Namibia	Michael Bates; United States
Women's 200 m	Gwen Torrence; United States	Juliet Cuthbert; Jamaica	Merlene Ottey; Jamaica
Men's 400 m	Quincy Watts; United States	Steve Lewis; United States	Samson Kitur; Kenya
Women's 400 m	Marie-José Pérec; France	Olga Bryzgina; Unified Team	Ximena Restrepo; Colombia
Men's 800 m	William Tanui; Kenya	Nixon Kiprotich; Kenya	Johnny Gray; United States
Women's 800 m	Ellen van Langen; Netherlands	Liliya Nurutdinova; Unified Team	Ana Fidelia Quirot; Cuba
Men's 1500 m	Fermin Cacho Ruiz; Spain	Rachid El Basir; Morocco	Mohammed Suleiman; Qatar
Women's 1500 m	Hassiba Boulmerka; Algeria	Lyudmila Rogachova; Unified Team	Qu Yunxia; China
Women's 3000 m	Yelena Romanova; Unified Team	Tetyana Dorovskikh; Unified Team	Angela Chalmers; Canada
Men's 5000 m	Dieter Baumann; Germany	Paul Bitok; Kenya	Fita Bayisa; Ethiopia
Men's 10,000 m	Khalid Skah; Morocco	Richard Chelimo; Kenya	Addis Abebe; Ethiopia
Women's 10,000 m	Derartu Tulu; Ethiopia	Elana Meyer; South Africa	Lynn Jennings; United States
Men's 110 m hurdles	Mark McKoy; Canada	Tony Dees; United States	Jack Pierce; United States
Women's 100 m hurdles	Voula Patoulidou; Greece	LaVonna Martin; United States	Yordanka Donkova; Bulgaria
Men's 400 m hurdles	Kevin Young; United States	Winthrop Graham; Jamaica	Kriss Akabusi; Great Britain
Women's 400 m hurdles	Sally Gunnell; Great Britain	Sandra Farmer-Patrick; United States	Janeene Vickers; United States
Men's 3000 m steeplechase	Matthew Birir; Kenya	Patrick Sang; Kenya	William Mutwol; Kenya
Men's 4×100 m relay	United States; Michael Marsh; Leroy Burrell; Dennis Mitchell; Carl Lewis; James Jett	Nigeria; Oluyemi Kayode; Chidi Imoh; Olapade Adeniken; Davidson Ezinwa; Osmond Ezinwa	Cuba; Andrés Simón; Joel Lamela; Joel Isasi; Jorge Aguilera
Women's 4×100 m relay	United States; Evelyn Ashford; Esther Jones; Carlette Guidry; Gwen Torrence; Michelle Finn	Unified Team; Olga Bogoslovskaya; Galina Malchugina; Marina Trandenkova; Irina Privalova	Nigeria; Beatrice Utondu; Faith Idehen; Christy Opara-Thompson; Mary Onyali
Men's 4×400 m relay	United States; Andrew Valmon; Quincy Watts; Michael Johnson; Steve Lewis; Darnell Hall; Charles Jenkins	Cuba; Lázaro Martínez; Héctor Herrera; Norberto Téllez; Roberto Hernández	Great Britain; Roger Black; David Grindley; Kriss Akabusi; John Regis; Du'aine Ladejo; Mark Richardson
Women's 4×400 m relay	Unified Team; Yelena Ruzina; Lyudmila Dzhigalova; Olga Nazarova; Olga Bryzgina; Liliya Nurutdinova; Marina Shmonina	United States; Natasha Kaiser; Gwen Torrence; Jearl Miles; Rochelle Stevens; Denean Hill; Dannette Young	Great Britain; Phylis Smith; Sandra Douglas; Jennifer Stoute; Sally Gunnell

=== Road ===
Event	Gold	Silver	Bronze
Women's 10 km walk	Chen Yueling; China	Yelena Nikolayeva; Unified Team	Li Chunxiu; China
Men's 20 km walk	Daniel Plaza; Spain	Guillaume LeBlanc; Canada	Giovanni De Benedictis; Italy
Men's 50 km walk	Andrey Perlov; Unified Team	Carlos Mercenario; Mexico	Ronald Weigel; Germany
Men's marathon	Hwang Young-Cho; South Korea	Koichi Morishita; Japan	Stephan Freigang; Germany
Women's marathon	Valentina Yegorova; Unified Team	Yuko Arimori; Japan	Lorraine Moller; New Zealand

=== Field ===
Event	Gold	Silver	Bronze
Men's long jump	Carl Lewis; United States	Mike Powell; United States	Joe Greene; United States
Women's long jump	Heike Drechsler; Germany	Inessa Kravets; Unified Team	Jackie Joyner-Kersee; United States
Men's triple jump	Mike Conley; United States	Charles Simpkins; United States	Frank Rutherford; Bahamas
Men's high jump	Javier Sotomayor; Cuba	Patrik Sjöberg; Sweden	Hollis Conway; United States
Men's high jump	Javier Sotomayor; Cuba	Patrik Sjöberg; Sweden	Tim Forsyth; Australia
Men's high jump	Javier Sotomayor; Cuba	Patrik Sjöberg; Sweden	Artur Partyka; Poland
Women's high jump	Heike Henkel; Germany	Alina Astafei; Romania	Joanet Quintero; Cuba
Men's pole vault	Maksim Tarasov; Unified Team	Igor Trandenkov; Unified Team	Javier García; Spain
Men's shot put	Mike Stulce; United States	Jim Doehring; United States	Vyacheslav Lykho; Unified Team
Women's shot put	Svetlana Krivelyova; Unified Team	Huang Zhihong; China	Kathrin Neimke; Germany
Men's discus throw	Romas Ubartas; Lithuania	Jürgen Schult; Germany	Roberto Moya; Cuba
Women's discus throw	Maritza Martén; Cuba	Tsvetanka Khristova; Bulgaria	Daniela Costian; Australia
Men's javelin throw	Jan Železný; Czechoslovakia	Seppo Räty; Finland	Steve Backley; Great Britain
Women's javelin throw	Silke Renk; Germany	Natalya Shikolenko; Unified Team	Karen Forkel; Germany
Men's hammer throw	Andrey Abduvaliyev; Unified Team	Igor Astapkovich; Unified Team	Igor Nikulin; Unified Team
Men's decathlon	Robert Změlík; Czechoslovakia	Antonio Peñalver; Spain	Dave Johnson; United States
Women's heptathlon	Jackie Joyner-Kersee; United States	Irina Belova; Unified Team	Sabine Braun; Germany

== Badminton ==
Event	Gold	Silver	Bronze
Men's singles	Alan Budikusuma (INA)	Ardy Wiranata (INA)	Thomas Stuer-Lauridsen (DEN)
Men's singles	Alan Budikusuma (INA)	Ardy Wiranata (INA)	Hermawan Susanto (INA)
Women's singles	Susi Susanti (INA)	Bang Soo-hyun (KOR)	Huang Hua (CHN)
Women's singles	Susi Susanti (INA)	Bang Soo-hyun (KOR)	Tang Jiuhong (CHN)
Men's doubles	South Korea; Kim Moon-Soo; Park Joo-bong	Indonesia; Eddy Hartono; Rudy Gunawan	China; Li Yongbo; Tian Bingyi
Men's doubles	South Korea; Kim Moon-Soo; Park Joo-bong	Indonesia; Eddy Hartono; Rudy Gunawan	Malaysia; Razif Sidek; Jalani Sidek
Women's doubles	South Korea; Hwang Hye-young; Chung So-young	China; Guan Weizhen; Nong Qunhua	South Korea; Gil Young-ah; Shim Eun-jung
Women's doubles	South Korea; Hwang Hye-young; Chung So-young	China; Guan Weizhen; Nong Qunhua	China; Lin Yan Fen; Yao Fen

== Baseball ==
Event	Gold	Silver	Bronze
Men's	Cuba; Antonio Pacheco Massó; Ermidelio Urrutia; Luis Ulacia; Alberto Hernández; Lázaro Vargas Alverez; Omar Linares; Germán Mesa; Juan Padilla; Lourdes Gourriel; José Estrada González; Osvaldo Fernández; Orlando Hernández; Giorge Diaz; Omar Ajete; Victor Mesa; Jorge Luis Valdes; José Raúl Delgado; Rolando Arrojo; Orestes Kindelán	Chinese Taipei; Chang Cheng-Hsien; Chang Wen-Chung; Chang Yaw-Teing; Chen Chi-Hsin; Chen Wei-Chen; Chiang Tai-Chuan; Huang Chung-Yi; Huang Wen-Po; Jong Yeu-Jeng; Ku Kuo-Chian; Kuo Lee Chien-Fu; Liao Ming-Hsiung; Lin Chao-Huang; Lin Kun-Han; Lo Chen-Jung; Lo Kuo-Chong; Pai Kun-Hong; Tsai Ming-Hung; Wang Kuang-Shih; Wu Shih-Hsih	Japan; Koichi Oshima; Shigeki Wakabayashi; Masafumi Nishi; Koji Tokunaga; Akihiro Togo; Hirotami Kojima; Hiroki Kokubo; Hiroyuki Sakaguchi; Yasunori Takami; Yasuhiro Sato; Kento Sugiyama; Katsumi Watanabe; Kazutaka Nishiyama; Masahito Kohiyama; Tomohito Ito; Masanori Sugiura; Takashi Miwa; Shinichi Sato; Hiroshi Nakamoto; Shinichiro Kawabata

== Basketball ==
Event	Gold	Silver	Bronze
Men's	United States; David Robinson; Patrick Ewing; Larry Bird; Scottie Pippen; Michael Jordan; Clyde Drexler; Karl Malone; John Stockton; Chris Mullin; Charles Barkley; Earvin "Magic" Johnson, Jr. Christian Laettner	Croatia; Dražen Petrović; Velimir Perasović; Danko Cvjetičanin; Toni Kukoč; Vladan Alanović; Franjo Arapović; Žan Tabak; Stojko Vranković; Alan Gregov; Arijan Komazec; Dino Rađa; Aramis Naglić	Lithuania; Valdemaras Chomičius; Alvydas Pazdrazdis; Arūnas Visockas; Darius Dimavičius; Romanas Brazdauskis; Gintaras Krapikas; Rimas Kurtinaitis; Arvydas Sabonis; Artūras Karnišovas; Šarūnas Marčiulionis; Gintaras Einikis; Sergejus Jovaiša
Women's	Unified Team; Elena Zhirko; Elena Baranova; Irina Guerlits; Elena Tornikidou; Elena Chvaibovitch; Marina Tkachenko; Irina Minkh; Elena Khoudachova; Irina Soumnikova; Elen Bounatiants; Natalia Zassoulskaia; Svetlana Zaboloueva	China; Cong Xuedi; He Jun; Li Dongmei; Li Xin; Liu Jun; Liu Qing; Peng Ping; Wang Fang; Zhan Shuping; Zheng Dongmei; Zheng Haixia	United States; Teresa Edwards; Daedra Charles; Clarissa Davis; Teresa Weatherspoon; Tammy Jackson; Vickie Orr; Victoria Bullett; Carolyn Jones; Katrina Felicia McClain; Medina Dixon; Cynthia Cooper; Suzanne McConnell

== Boxing ==
Event	Gold	Silver	Bronze
Light flyweight	Rogelio Marcelo (CUB)	Daniel Petrov (BUL)	Jan Quast (GER)
Light flyweight	Rogelio Marcelo (CUB)	Daniel Petrov (BUL)	Roel Velasco (PHI)
Flyweight	Choi Chol-Su (PRK)	Raúl González (CUB)	István Kovács (HUN)
Flyweight	Choi Chol-Su (PRK)	Raúl González (CUB)	Tim Austin (USA)
Bantamweight	Joel Casamayor (CUB)	Wayne McCullough (IRL)	Li Gwang-Sik (PRK)
Bantamweight	Joel Casamayor (CUB)	Wayne McCullough (IRL)	Mohammed Achik (MAR)
Featherweight	Andreas Tews (GER)	Faustino Reyes (ESP)	Hocine Soltani (ALG)
Featherweight	Andreas Tews (GER)	Faustino Reyes (ESP)	Ramaz Paliani (EUN)
Lightweight	Oscar De La Hoya (USA)	Marco Rudolph (GER)	Namjilyn Bayarsaikhan (MGL)
Lightweight	Oscar De La Hoya (USA)	Marco Rudolph (GER)	Hong Sung-Sik (KOR)
Light welterweight	Héctor Vinent (CUB)	Mark Leduc (CAN)	Jyri Kjäll (FIN)
Light welterweight	Héctor Vinent (CUB)	Mark Leduc (CAN)	Leonard Doroftei (ROU)
Welterweight	Michael Carruth (IRL)	Juan Hernández Sierra (CUB)	Aníbal Santiago Acevedo (PUR)
Welterweight	Michael Carruth (IRL)	Juan Hernández Sierra (CUB)	Arkhom Chenglai (THA)
Light Middleweight	Juan Carlos Lemus (CUB)	Orhan Delibaş (NED)	György Mizsei (HUN)
Light Middleweight	Juan Carlos Lemus (CUB)	Orhan Delibaş (NED)	Robin Reid (GBR)
Middleweight	Ariel Hernández (CUB)	Chris Byrd (USA)	Chris Johnson (CAN)
Middleweight	Ariel Hernández (CUB)	Chris Byrd (USA)	Lee Seung-Bae (KOR)
Light heavyweight	Torsten May (GER)	Rostyslav Zaulychnyi (EUN)	Wojciech Bartnik (POL)
Light heavyweight	Torsten May (GER)	Rostyslav Zaulychnyi (EUN)	Zoltán Béres (HUN)
Heavyweight	Félix Savón (CUB)	David Izonritei (NGR)	Arnold Vanderlyde (NED)
Heavyweight	Félix Savón (CUB)	David Izonritei (NGR)	David Tua (NZL)
Super heavyweight	Roberto Balado (CUB)	Richard Igbineghu (NGR)	Brian Nielsen (DEN)
Super heavyweight	Roberto Balado (CUB)	Richard Igbineghu (NGR)	Svilen Rusinov (BUL)

== Canoeing ==
=== Flatwater ===
Event	Gold	Silver	Bronze
Men's C-1 500 metres	Nikolay Bukhalov; Bulgaria	Michał Śliwiński; Unified Team	Olaf Heukrodt; Germany
Men's C-1 1000 metres	Nikolay Bukhalov; Bulgaria	Ivans Klementjevs; Latvia	György Zala; Hungary
Men's C-2 500 metres	Unified Team; Dmitri Dovgalenok; Aleksandr Maseikov	Germany; Ulrich Papke; Ingo Spelly	Bulgaria; Martin Marinov; Blagovest Stoyanov
Men's C-2 1000 metres	Germany; Ulrich Papke; Ingo Spelly	Denmark; Christian Frederiksen; Arne Nielsson	France; Didier Hoyer; Olivier Boivin
Men's K-1 500 metres	Mikko Kolehmainen; Finland	Zsolt Gyulai; Hungary	Knut Holmann; Norway
Women's K-1 500 metres	Birgit Schmidt; Germany	Rita Kőbán; Hungary	Izabela Dylewska; Poland
Men's K-1 1000 metres	Clint Robinson; Australia	Knut Holmann; Norway	Greg Barton; United States
Men's K-2 500 metres	Germany; Ramona Portwich; Anke von Seck	Sweden; Agneta Andersson; Susanne Gunnarsson	Hungary; Rita Kőbán; Éva Dónusz
Women's K-2 500 metres	Germany; Ramona Portwich; Anke von Seck	Sweden; Agneta Andersson; Susanne Gunnarsson	Hungary; Rita Kőbán; Éva Dónusz
Men's K-2 1000 metres	Germany; Kay Bluhm; Torsten Gutsche	Sweden; Kalle Sundqvist; Gunnar Olsson	Poland; Grzegorz Kotowicz; Dariusz Białkowski
Women's K-4 500 metres	Hungary; Rita Kőbán; Éva Dónusz; Erika Mészáros; Kinga Czigány	Germany; Katrin Borchert; Ramona Portwich; Birgit Schmidt; Anke von Seck	Sweden; Anna Olsson; Agneta Andersson; Maria Haglund; Susanne Rosenqvist
Men's K-4 1000 metres	Germany; Mario von Appen; Oliver Kegel; Thomas Reineck; André Wohllebe	Hungary; Ferenc Csipes; Zsolt Gyulay; Attila Ábrahám; László Fidel	Australia; Ramon Andersson; Kelvin Graham; Ian Rowling; Steven Wood

=== Slalom ===
Event	Gold	Silver	Bronze
Men's slalom C-1	Lukáš Pollert; Czechoslovakia	Gareth Marriott; Great Britain	Jacky Avril; France
Men's slalom C-2	United States; Scott Strausbaugh; Joe Jacobi	Czechoslovakia; Miroslav Šimek; Jiří Rohan	France; Frank Adisson; Wilfrid Forgues
Men's slalom K-1	Pierpaolo Ferrazzi; Italy	Sylvain Curinier; France	Jochen Lettmann; Germany
Women's slalom K-1	Elisabeth Micheler-Jones; Germany	Danielle Woodward; Australia	Dana Chladek; United States

== Cycling ==
=== Road ===
Event	Gold	Silver	Bronze
Men's road race	Fabio Casartelli; Italy	Erik Dekker; Netherlands	Dainis Ozols; Latvia
Women's road race	Kathryn Watt; Australia	Jeannie Longo-Ciprelli; France	Monique Knol; Netherlands
Men's team time trial	Germany; Michael Rich; Bernd Dittert; Christian Meyer; Uwe Peschel	Italy; Andrea Peron; Flavio Anastasia; Luca Colombo; Gianfranco Contri	France; Jean-Louis Harel; Hervé Boussard; Didier Faivre-Pierret; Philippe Gaumont

=== Track ===
Event	Gold	Silver	Bronze
Men's sprint	Jens Fiedler; Germany	Gary Neiwand; Australia	Curtis Harnett; Canada
Women's sprint	Erika Salumäe; Estonia	Annett Neumann; Germany	Ingrid Haringa; Netherlands
Men's individual pursuit	Chris Boardman; Great Britain	Jens Lehmann; Germany	Gary Anderson; New Zealand
Women's individual pursuit	Petra Roßner; Germany	Kathryn Watt; Australia	Rebecca Twigg; United States
Men's team pursuit	Germany; Stefan Steinweg; Andreas Walzer; Guido Fulst; Michael Glöckner; Jens Lehmann	Australia; Stuart O'Grady; Brett Aitken; Stephen McGlede; Shaun O'Brien	Denmark; Jan Petersen; Michael Sandstød; Ken Frost; Jimmi Madsen; Klaus Nielsen
Men's points race	Giovanni Lombardi; Italy	Léon van Bon; Netherlands	Cédric Mathy; Belgium
Men's 1 km Time Trial	José Manuel Moreno; Spain	Shane Kelly; Australia	Erin Hartwell; United States

== Equestrian ==
Event	Gold	Silver	Bronze
Individual dressage	Nicole Uphoff on Rembrandt (GER)	Isabell Werth on Gigolo (GER)	Klaus Balkenhol on Goldstern (GER)
Team dressage	Germany; Klaus Balkenhol and Goldstern; Nicole Uphoff and Rembrandt; Monica Theodorescu and Grunox; Isabell Werth and Gigolo	Netherlands; Tineke Bartels and Courage; Anky van Grunsven and Bonfire; Ellen Bontje and Larius; Annemarie Sanders and Sanders-Keyzer	United States; Robert Dover and Lectron; Carol Lavell and Gifted; Charlotte Bredahl and Monsieur; Michael Poulin and Graf George
Individual eventing	Matthew Ryan on Kibah Tic Toc (AUS)	Herbert Blocker on Feine Dame (GER)	Blyth Tait on Messiah (NZL)
Team eventing	Australia; David Green and Duncan II; Gillian Rolton and Peppermint Grove; Andrew Hoy and Kiwi; Matthew Ryan and Kibah Tic Toc	New Zealand; Blyth Tait and Messiah; Andrew Nicholson and Spinning Rhombus; Mark Todd and Welton Greylag; Victoria Latta and Chief	Germany; Herbert Bloecker and Feine Dame; Ralf Ehrenbrink and Kildare II; Matthias Baumann and Alabaster; Cord Mysegages and Ricardo
Individual jumping	Ludger Beerbaum on Classic Touch (GER)	Piet Raymakers on Ratina Z (NED)	Norman Dello Joio on Irish (USA)
Team jumping	Netherlands; Piet Raymakers and Ratina Z Bert Romp and Waldo E Jan Tops and Top Gun; Jos Lansink and Egano	Austria; Boris Boor and Love Me Tender; Joerg Muenzner and Graf Grande; Hugo Simon and Apricot D Thomas Fruehmann and Genius	France; Hervé Godignon and Quidam de Revel; Hubert Bourdy and Razzina du Poncel; Michel Robert and Nonix; Eric Navet and Quito de Baussy

== Fencing ==
Event	Gold	Silver	Bronze
Men's individual épée	Éric Srecki; France	Pavel Kolobkov; Unified Team	Jean-Michel Henry; France
Men's team épée	Germany; Elmar Borrmann; Robert Felisiak; Arnd Schmitt; Uwe Proske; Wladimir Reznitschenko	Hungary; Iván Kovács; Krisztián Kulcsár; Ferenc Hegedűs; Ernõ Kolczonay; Gábor Totola	Unified Team; Pavel Kolobkov; Andrey Shuvalov; Sergei Kravchouk; Sergei Kostarev; Valery Zakharevich
Men's individual foil	Philippe Omnes; France	Sergei Golubitsky; Unified Team	Elvis Gregory; Cuba
Women's individual foil	Giovanna Trillini; Italy	Wang Huifeng; China	Tatiana Sadovskaya; Unified Team
Men's team foil	Germany; Udo Wagner; Ulrich Schreck; Thorsten Weidner; Alexander Koch; Ingo Weissenborn	Cuba; Elvis Gregory; Guillermo Betancourt Scull; Oscar García Perez; Tulio Diaz Babier; Hermenegildo Garcia Marturell	Poland; Marian Sypniewski; Piotr Kiełpikowski; Adam Krzesiński; Cezary Siess; Ryszard Sobczak
Women's team foil	Italy; Diana Bianchedi; Francesca Bortolozzi Borella; Giovanna Trillini; Dorina Vaccaroni; Margherita Zalaffi	Germany; Sabine Bau; Zita Funkenhauser; Annette Dobmeier; Anja Fichtel-Mauritz; Monika Weber-Koszto	Romania; Reka Szabo-Lazar; Claudia Grigorescu; Elisabeta Tufan; Laura Badea; Roxana Dumitrescu
Men's individual sabre	Bence Szabó; Hungary	Marco Marin; Italy	Jean-François Lamour; France
Men's team sabre	Unified Team; Grigory Kiriyenko; Aleksandr Shirshov; Heorhiy Pohosov; Vadim Gutzeit; Stanislav Pozdnyakov	Hungary; Bence Szabó; Csaba Köves; György Nébald; Péter Abay; Imre Bujdosó	France; Jean-François Lamour; Jean-Phillippe Daurelle; Franck Ducheix; Hervé Grainger-Veyron; Pierre Guichot

== Field Hockey ==
Event	Gold	Silver	Bronze
Men's	Germany; Michael Knauth; Christopher Reitz; Carsten Fischer; Jan-Peter Tewes; Volker Fried; Klaus Michler; Andreas Keller; Michael Metz; Christian Blunck; Sven Meinhardt; Michael Hilgers; Andreas Becker; Stefan Saliger; Stefan Tewes; Christian Mayerhöfer; Oliver Kurtz	Australia; John Bestall; Warren Birmingham; Lee Bodimeade; Ashley Carey; Gregory Corbitt; Stephen Davies; Damon Diletti; Lachlan Dreher; Lachlan Elmer; Dean Evans; Paul Lewis; Graham Reid; Jay Stacy; Michael York; David Wansbrough; Ken Wark	Pakistan; Tahir Zaman; Rana Mujahid Ali; Anjum Saeed; Muhammad Shahbaz; Muhammad Khalid; Farhad Hassan Khan; Shahid Ali Khan; Musaddiq Hussain; Muhammad Qamar Ibrahim; Khawaja Muhammad Junaid; Muhammad Asif Bajwa; Khalid Bashir; Wasim Feroze; Mansoor Ahmad; Shahbaz Ahmad; Muhammad Akhlaq Ahmad
Women's	Spain; Anna Maiques; Celia Correa; Elisabeth Maragall; María Ángeles Rodríguez; María Carmen Barea; Marívi González; Maider Tellería; María Isabel Martínez; Mercedes Coghen; Nagore Gabellanes; Natalia Dorado; Nuria Olivé; Silvia Manrique; Sonia Barrio; Teresa Motos; Virginia Ramírez	Germany; Britta Becker; Tanja Dickenscheid; Nadine Ernsting-Krienke; Christine Ferneck; Eva Hagenbäumer; Franziska Hentschel; Caren Jungjohann; Katrin Kauschke; Irina Kuhnt; Heike Lätzsch; Susanne Müller; Tina Peters; Simone Thomaschinski; Bianca Weiß; Anke Wild; Susie Wollschläger	Great Britain; Joanne Thompson; Helen Morgan; Lisa Bayliss; Karen Brown; Mary Nevill; Jill Atkins; Vickey Dixon; Wendy Fraser; Sandy Lister; Jane Sixsmith; Alison Ramsay; Jackie McWilliams; Tammy Miller; Mandy Nicholls; Kathryn Johnson; Susan Fraser

== Football ==
Event	Gold	Silver	Bronze
Men's	Spain; José Amavisca; Rafael Berges; Santiago Cañizares; Abelardo; Albert Ferrer; Pep Guardiola; Miguel Hernández; Toni; Mikel Lasa; Juan Manuel López; Javier Manjarín; Luis Enrique; Kiko; Alfonso; Antonio Pinilla; Francisco Soler; Gabriel Vidal; Roberto Solozábal; David Villabona; Paqui	Poland; Dariusz Adamczuk; Marek Bajor; Jerzy Brzęczek; Marek Koźmiński; Dariusz Gęsior; Marcin Jałocha; Tomasz Łapiński; Tomasz Wałdoch; Aleksander Kłak; Andrzej Kobylański; Ryszard Staniek; Wojciech Kowalczyk; Andrzej Juskowiak; Grzegorz Mielcarski; Piotr Świerczewski; Mirosław Waligóra; Dariusz Koseła; Arkadiusz Onyszko; Dariusz Szubert; Tomasz Wieszczycki	Ghana; Joachin Yaw Acheampong; Simon Addo; Sammi Adjei; Maxwell Konadu; Mamood Amadu; Isaac Asare; Frank Amankwah; Nii Lamptey; Bernard Aryee; Kwame Ayew; Mohammed Gargo; Mohammed Kalilu; Ibrahim Dossey; Samuel Osei Kuffour; Samuel Kumah; Anthony Mensah; Alex Nyarko; Yaw Preko; Shamo Quaye; Oli Rahman

== Gymnastics ==
=== Artistic ===
Event	Gold	Silver	Bronze
Men's individual all-around	Vitaly Scherbo; Unified Team	Grigory Misutin; Unified Team	Valery Belenky; Unified Team
Women's individual all-around	Tatiana Gutsu; Unified Team	Shannon Miller; United States	Lavinia Miloşovici; Romania
Men's team all-around	Unified Team; Valery Belenky; Igor Korobchinski; Grigory Misutin; Vitaly Scherbo; Rustam Sharipov; Alexei Voropaev	China; Guo Linyao; Li Chunyang; Li Dashuang; Li Ge; Li Jing; Li Xiaoshuang	Japan; Yutaka Aihara; Takashi Chinen; Yoshiaki Hatakeda; Yukio Iketani; Masayuki Matsunaga; Daisuke Nishikawa
Women's team all-around	Unified Team; Svetlana Boginskaya; Oksana Chusovitina; Rozalia Galiyeva; Elena Grudneva; Tatiana Gutsu; Tatiana Lysenko	Romania; Cristina Bontaş; Gina Gogean; Vanda Hădărean; Lavinia Miloşovici; Maria Neculiţă; Mirela Paşca	United States; Wendy Bruce; Dominique Dawes; Shannon Miller; Betty Okino; Kerri Strug; Kim Zmeskal
Women's balance beam	Tatiana Lysenko; Unified Team	Lu Li; China	none awarded
Women's balance beam	Tatiana Lysenko; Unified Team	Shannon Miller; United States	none awarded
Men's floor	Li Xiaoshuang; China	Yukio Iketani; Japan	none awarded
Men's floor	Li Xiaoshuang; China	Grigory Misutin; Unified Team	none awarded
Women's floor	Lavinia Miloşovici; Romania	Henrietta Ónodi; Hungary	Cristina Bontaş; Romania
Women's floor	Lavinia Miloşovici; Romania	Henrietta Ónodi; Hungary	Shannon Miller; United States
Women's floor	Lavinia Miloşovici; Romania	Henrietta Ónodi; Hungary	Tatiana Gutsu; Unified Team
Men's horizontal bar	Trent Dimas; United States	Grigory Misutin; Unified Team	none awarded
Men's horizontal bar	Trent Dimas; United States	Andreas Wecker; Germany	none awarded
Men's parallel bars	Vitaly Scherbo; Unified Team	Li Jing; China	Igor Korobchinski; Unified Team
Men's parallel bars	Vitaly Scherbo; Unified Team	Li Jing; China	Guo Linyao; China
Men's parallel bars	Vitaly Scherbo; Unified Team	Li Jing; China	Masayuki Matsunaga; Japan
Men's pommel horse	Vitaly Scherbo; Unified Team	none awarded	Andreas Wecker; Germany
Men's pommel horse	Pae Gil-Su; North Korea	none awarded	Andreas Wecker; Germany
Men's rings	Vitaly Scherbo; Unified Team	Li Jing; China	Andreas Wecker; Germany
Men's rings	Vitaly Scherbo; Unified Team	Li Jing; China	Li Xiaoshuang; China
Women's uneven bars	Lu Li; China	Tatiana Gutsu; Unified Team	Shannon Miller; United States
Men's vault	Vitaly Scherbo; Unified Team	Grigory Misutin; Unified Team	Yoo Ok-ryul; South Korea
Women's vault	Lavinia Miloşovici; Romania	none awarded	Tatiana Lysenko; Unified Team
Women's vault	Henrietta Ónodi; Hungary	none awarded	Tatiana Lysenko; Unified Team

=== Rhythmic ===
Event	Gold	Silver	Bronze
Women's individual all-around	Alexandra Timoshenko; Unified Team	Carolina Pascual; Spain	Oxana Skaldina; Unified Team

== Handball ==
Event	Gold	Silver	Bronze
Men's	Unified Team; Andrey Barbashinsky; Serhiy Bebeshko; Igor Chumak; Talant Duyshebaev; Yuriy Gavrilov; Valery Gopin; Oleg Grebnev; Oleg Kiselyov; Vasily Kudinov; Andrey Lavrov; Igor Vasilev; Mikhail Yakimovich	Sweden; Magnus Andersson; Robert Andersson; Anders Bäckegren; Per Carlén; Magnus Cato; Erik Hajas; Robert Hedin; Patrik Liljestrand; Ola Lindgren; Mats Olsson; Staffan Olsson; Axel Sjöblad; Tommy Suoraniemi; Tomas Svensson; Pierre Thorsson; Magnus Wislander	France; Philippe Debureau; Philippe Gardent; Denis Lathoud; Pascal Mahé; Philippe Médard; Gaël Monthurel; Laurent Munier; Frédéric Perez; Alain Portes; Thierry Perreux; Éric Quintin; Jackson Richardson; Stéphane Stoecklin; Jean-Luc Thiébaut; Denis Tristant; Frédéric Volle
Women's	South Korea; Cha Jae-Kyung; Han Hyun-Sook; Han Sun-Hee; Hong Jeong-ho; Jang Ri-Ra; Kim Hwa-Sook; Lee Ho-Youn; Lee Mi-Young; Lim O-Kyeong; Min Hye-Sook; Moon Hyang-Ja; Nam Eun-Young; Oh Sung-Ok; Park Jeong-Lim; Park Kap-Sook	Norway; Hege Kirsti Frøseth; Tonje Sagstuen; Hanne Hogness; Heidi Sundal; Susann Goksør; Cathrine Svendsen; Mona Dahle; Siri Eftedal; Henriette Henriksen; Ingrid Steen; Karin Pettersen; Annette Skotvoll; Kristine Duvholt; Heidi Tjugum	Unified Team; Natalya Anisimova; Maryna Bazhanova; Svetlana Bogdanova; Galina Borzenkova; Natalya Deryugina; Tatyana Dzhandzhgava; Lyudmila Gudz; Elina Guseva; Tetyana Horb; Larisa Kiselyova; Natalya Morskova; Galina Onoprienko; Svetlana Pryakhina

== Judo ==
Event	Gold	Silver	Bronze
Men's Extra lightweight (−60 kg)	Nazim Huseynov; Unified Team	Yoon Hyun; South Korea	Tadanori Koshino; Japan
Men's Extra lightweight (−60 kg)	Nazim Huseynov; Unified Team	Yoon Hyun; South Korea	Richard Trautmann; Germany
Women's Extra lightweight (−48 kg)	Cécile Nowak; France	Ryoko Tamura; Japan	Amarilis Savón; Cuba
Women's Extra lightweight (−48 kg)	Cécile Nowak; France	Ryoko Tamura; Japan	Hülya Şenyurt; Turkey
Men's Half lightweight (−66 kg)	Rogério Sampaio; Brazil	József Csák; Hungary	Israel Hernández; Cuba
Men's Half lightweight (−66 kg)	Rogério Sampaio; Brazil	József Csák; Hungary	Udo Quellmalz; Germany
Women's Half lightweight (−52 kg)	Almudena Muñoz; Spain	Noriko Mizoguchi; Japan	Li Zhongyun; China
Women's Half lightweight (−52 kg)	Almudena Muñoz; Spain	Noriko Mizoguchi; Japan	Sharon Rendle; Great Britain
Men's Lightweight (−71 kg)	Toshihiko Koga; Japan	Bertalan Hajtós; Hungary	Chung Hoon; South Korea
Men's Lightweight (−71 kg)	Toshihiko Koga; Japan	Bertalan Hajtós; Hungary	Oren Smadja; Israel
Women's Lightweight (−56 kg)	Miriam Blasco; Spain	Nicola Fairbrother; Great Britain	Driulis González; Cuba
Women's Lightweight (−56 kg)	Miriam Blasco; Spain	Nicola Fairbrother; Great Britain	Chiyori Tateno; Japan
Men's Half middleweight (−78 kg)	Hidehiko Yoshida; Japan	Jason Morris; United States	Bertrand Damaisin; France
Men's Half middleweight (−78 kg)	Hidehiko Yoshida; Japan	Jason Morris; United States	Kim Byung-joo; South Korea
Women's Half middleweight (−61 kg)	Cathérine Fleury; France	Yael Arad; Israel	Yelena Petrova; Unified Team
Women's Half middleweight (−61 kg)	Cathérine Fleury; France	Yael Arad; Israel	Zhang Di; China
Men's Middleweight (−86 kg)	Waldemar Legień; Poland	Pascal Tayot; France	Nicolas Gill; Canada
Men's Middleweight (−86 kg)	Waldemar Legień; Poland	Pascal Tayot; France	Hirotaka Okada; Japan
Women's Middleweight (−66 kg)	Odalis Revé; Cuba	Emanuela Pierantozzi; Italy	Kate Howey; Great Britain
Women's Middleweight (−66 kg)	Odalis Revé; Cuba	Emanuela Pierantozzi; Italy	Heidi Rakels; Belgium
Men's Half heavyweight (−95 kg)	Antal Kovács; Hungary	Raymond Stevens; Great Britain	Theo Meijer; Netherlands
Men's Half heavyweight (−95 kg)	Antal Kovács; Hungary	Raymond Stevens; Great Britain	Dmitri Sergeyev; Unified Team
Women's Half heavyweight (−72 kg)	Kim Mi-jung; South Korea	Yoko Tanabe; Japan	Irene de Kok; Netherlands
Women's Half heavyweight (−72 kg)	Kim Mi-jung; South Korea	Yoko Tanabe; Japan	Laetitia Meignan; France
Men's Heavyweight (+95 kg)	David Khakhaleishvili; Unified Team	Naoya Ogawa; Japan	Imre Csosz; Hungary
Men's Heavyweight (+95 kg)	David Khakhaleishvili; Unified Team	Naoya Ogawa; Japan	David Douillet; France
Women's Heavyweight (+72 kg)	Zhuang Xiaoyan; China	Estela Rodríguez; Cuba	Natalia Lupino; France
Women's Heavyweight (+72 kg)	Zhuang Xiaoyan; China	Estela Rodríguez; Cuba	Yoko Sakaue; Japan

== Modern pentathlon ==
Event	Gold	Silver	Bronze
Individual	Arkadiusz Skrzypaszek; Poland	Attila Mizsér; Hungary	Eduard Zenovka; Unified Team
Team	Poland; Maciej Czyzowicz; Dariusz Gozdziak; Arkadiusz Skrzypaszek	Unified Team; Anatoli Starostin; Dmitri Svatkovskiy; Eduard Zenovka	Italy; Roberto Bomprezzi; Carlo Massullo; Gianluca Tiberti

== Rowing ==
Event	Gold	Silver	Bronze
Men's single sculls	Thomas Lange; Germany	Václav Chalupa; Czechoslovakia	Kajetan Broniewski; Poland
Women's single sculls	Elisabeta Lipă; Romania	Annelies Braedael; Belgium	Silken Laumann; Canada
Men's double sculls	Australia; Peter Antonie; Stephen Hawkins	Austria; Arnold Jonke; Christoph Zerbst	Netherlands; Nico Rienks; Henk-Jan Zwolle
Women's double sculls	Germany; Kerstin Köppen; Kathrin Boron	Romania; Veronica Cochela; Elisabeta Lipă	China; Xiaoli Gu; Huali Lu
Men's quadruple sculls	Germany; Andreas Hajek; Michael Steinbach; Stephan Volkert; André Willms	Norway; Kjetil Undset; Per Sætersdal; Lars Bjønness; Rolf Thorsen	Italy; Alessandro Corona; Gianluca Farina; Rossano Galtarossa; Filippo Soffici
Women's quadruple sculls	Germany; Sybille Schmidt; Birgit Peter; Kerstin Müller; Kristina Mundt	Romania; Anişoara Dobre; Doina Ignat; Constanța Burcică; Veronica Cochela	Unified Team; Antonina Zelikovich; Tetiana Ustiuzhanina; Ekaterina Karsten; Yelena Khloptseva
Men's coxless pair	Great Britain; Matthew Pinsent; Steve Redgrave	Germany; Colin von Ettingshausen; Peter Hoeltzenbein	Slovenia; Iztok Čop; Denis Žvegelj
Women's coxless pair	Canada; Kathleen Heddle; Marnie McBean	Germany; Ingeburg Schwerzmann; Stefani Werremeier	United States; Stephanie Pierson; Anna Seaton
Men's coxed pair	Great Britain; Garry Herbert (cox); Greg Searle; Jonny Searle	Italy; Giuseppe Di Capua (cox); Carmine Abbagnale; Giuseppe Abbagnale	Romania; Dumitru Răducanu (cox); Dimitrie Popescu; Nicolae Țaga
Men's coxless four	Australia; Andrew Cooper; Nick Green; Mike McKay; James Tomkins	United States; Jeffrey McLaughlin; William Burden; Thomas Bohrer; Patrick Manning	Slovenia; Milan Janša; Sadik Mujkič; Sašo Mirjanič; Janez Klemenčič
Women's coxless four	Canada; Jennifer Barnes; Jessica Monroe; Brenda Taylor; Kay Worthington	United States; Shelagh Donohoe; Cynthia Eckert; Carol Feeney; Amy Fuller	Germany; Antje Frank; Annette Hohn; Gabriele Mehl; Birte Siech
Men's coxed eight	Canada; Darren Barber; Andrew Crosby; Michael Forgeron; Robert Marland; Terrence Paul (cox); Derek Porter; Michael Rascher; Bruce Robertson; John Wallace	Romania; Iulică Ruican; Viorel Talapan; Vasile Năstase; Gabriel Marin; Dănuț Dobre; Valentin Robu; Vasile Măstăcan; Ioan Vizitiu; Marin Gheorghe (cox)	Germany; Roland Baar; Armin Eichholz; Detlef Kirchhoff; Manfred Klein (cox); Bahne Rabe; Frank Richter; Hans Sennewald; Thorsten Streppelhoff; Ansgar Wessling
Women's coxed eight	Canada; Jennifer Barnes; Shannon Crawford; Megan Delehanty; Kathleen Heddle; Marnie McBean; Jessica Monroe; Brenda Taylor; Lesley Thompson (cox); Kay Worthington	Romania; Veronica Necula; Adriana Bazon; Maria Păduraru; Iulia Bulie; Doina Robu; Victoria Lepădatu; Doina Şnep-Bălan; Elena Georgescu (cox); Ioana Olteanu	Germany; Sylvia Dördelmann; Kathrin Haacker; Christiane Harzendorf; Daniela Neunast (cox); Cerstin Petersmann; Dana Pyritz; Annegret Strauch; Ute Wagner; Judith Zeidler

== Sailing ==
Event	Gold	Silver	Bronze
Men's sailboard	Franck David (FRA)	Mike Gebhardt (USA)	Lars Kleppich (AUS)
Women's sailboard	Barbara Kendall (NZL)	Zhang Xiaodong (CHN)	Dorien de Vries (NED)
Men's Finn	José van der Ploeg (ESP)	Brian Ledbetter (USA)	Craig Monk (NZL)
Women's Europe	Linda Andersen (NOR)	Natalia Vía Dufresne (ESP)	Julia Trotman (USA)
Men's 470	Spain; Jordi Calafat; Francisco Sanchez	United States; Morgan Reeser; Kevin Burnham	Estonia; Tõnu Tõniste; Toomas Tõniste
Women's 470	Spain; Theresa Zabell; Patricia Guerra	New Zealand; Leslie Egnot; Jan Shearer	United States; Jennifer Isler; Pamela Healy
Flying Dutchman	Spain; Luis Doreste; Domingo Manrique	United States; Stephen Bourdow; Paul Foerster	Denmark; Jens Bojsen-Møller; Jørgen Bojsen-Møller
Soling	Denmark; Jesper Bank; Steen Secher; Jesper Seier	United States; Kevin Mahaney; Jim Brady; Doug Kern	Great Britain; Lawrie Smith; Robert Cruikshank; Ossie Stewart
Star	United States; Mark Reynolds; Harold Haenel	New Zealand; Rod Davis; Don Cowie	Canada; Ross MacDonald; Eric Jespersen
Tornado	France; Yves Loday; Nicolas Hénard	United States; Randy Smyth; Keith Notary	Australia; Mitch Booth; John Forbes

== Shooting ==
Event	Gold	Silver	Bronze
Men's 10 m air pistol	Wang Yifu; China	Sergei Pyzhianov; Unified Team	Sorin Babii; Romania
Women's 10 m air pistol	Yeo Kab-soon; South Korea	Vesela Letcheva; Bulgaria	Aranka Binder; Independent Olympic Participants
Men's 10 m air rifle	Yuri Fedkin; Unified Team	Franck Badiou; France	Johann Riederer; Germany
Women's 10 m air rifle	Marina Logvinenko; Unified Team	Jasna Šekarić; Independent Olympic Participants	Mariya Grozdeva; Bulgaria
Women's 25 m pistol	Marina Logvinenko; Unified Team	Li Duihong; China	Dorjsürengiin Mönkhbayar; Mongolia
Men's 25 m rapid fire pistol	Ralf Schumann; Germany	Afanasijs Kuzmins; Latvia	Vladimir Vokhmyanin; Unified Team
Men's 50 m pistol	Kanstantsin Lukashyk; Unified Team	Wang Yifu; China	Ragnar Skanåker; Sweden
Men's 50 m rifle three positions	Hrachya Petikyan; Unified Team	Robert Foth; United States	Ryohei Koba; Japan
Women's 50 m rifle three positions	Launi Meili; United States	Nonka Matova; Bulgaria	Małgorzata Książkiewicz; Poland
Men's 50 m rifle prone	Lee Eun-chul; South Korea	Harald Stenvaag; Norway	Stevan Pletikosić; Independent Olympic Participants
Skeet	Zhang Shan; China	Juan Giha; Peru	Bruno Rossetti; Italy
Trap	Petr Hrdlička; Czechoslovakia	Kazumi Watanabe; Japan	Marco Venturini; Italy

== Table tennis ==
Event	Gold	Silver	Bronze
Men's singles	Jan-Ove Waldner; Sweden	Jean-Philippe Gatien; France	Kim Taek-Soo; South Korea Ma Wenge; China
Men's doubles	Lü Lin; Wang Tao (CHN)	Steffen Fetzner; Jörg Roßkopf (GER)	Kang Hee-Chan; Lee Chul-Seung (KOR) Kim Taek-Soo; Yoo Nam-Kyu (KOR)
Women's singles	Deng Yaping; China	Qiao Hong; China	Li Bun-Hui; North Korea Hyun Jung-Hwa; South Korea
Women's doubles	Deng Yaping; Qiao Hong (CHN)	Chen Zihe; Gao Jun (CHN)	Li Bun-Hui; Yu Sun-Bok (PRK) Hyun Jung-Hwa; Hong Cha-Ok (KOR)

== Tennis ==
Event	Gold	Silver	Bronze
Men's singles	Marc Rosset; Switzerland	Jordi Arrese; Spain	Goran Ivanišević; Croatia
Men's singles	Marc Rosset; Switzerland	Jordi Arrese; Spain	Andrei Cherkasov; Unified Team
Women's singles	Jennifer Capriati; United States	Steffi Graf; Germany	Mary Joe Fernandez; United States
Women's singles	Jennifer Capriati; United States	Steffi Graf; Germany	Arantxa Sánchez Vicario; Spain
Men's doubles	Boris Becker and Michael Stich (GER)	Wayne Ferreira and Piet Norval (RSA)	Goran Ivanišević and Goran Prpić (CRO)
Men's doubles	Boris Becker and Michael Stich (GER)	Wayne Ferreira and Piet Norval (RSA)	Javier Frana and Christian Miniussi (ARG)
Women's doubles	Gigi Fernández and Mary Joe Fernández (USA)	Conchita Martínez and Arantxa Sánchez Vicario (ESP)	Leila Meskhi and Natasha Zvereva (EUN)
Women's doubles	Gigi Fernández and Mary Joe Fernández (USA)	Conchita Martínez and Arantxa Sánchez Vicario (ESP)	Nicole Bradtke and Rachel McQuillan (AUS)

== Volleyball ==
Event	Gold	Silver	Bronze
Men's	Brazil; Amauri; Carlão; Douglas; Giovane; Janelson; Jorge Edson; Maurício; Marcelo Negrão; Paulão; Pampa; Talmo; Tande	Netherlands; Edwin Benne; Peter Blangé; Ron Boudrie; Henk-Jan Held; Martin van der Horst; Marko Klok; Olof van der Meulen; Jan Posthuma; Avital Selinger; Martin Teffer; Ronald Zoodsma; Ron Zwerver	United States; Nick Becker; Carlos Briceno; Bob Ctvrtlik; Scott Fortune; Dan Greenbaum; Brent Hilliard; Bryan Ivie; Douglas Partie; Bob Samuelson; Eric Sato; Jeff Stork; Steve Timmons
Women's	Cuba; Regla Bell; Mercedes Calderón; Magaly Carvajal; Marlenis Costa; Idalmis Gato; Lilia Izquierdo; Norka Latamblet; Mireya Luis; Tania Ortiz; Raisa O'Farril; Regla Torres	Unified Team; Valentina Ogienko; Natalya Morozova; Marina Nikoulina; Elena Tyurina; Irina Smirnova; Tatyana Sidorenko; Tatiana Menchova; Yevgeniya Artamonova; Galina Lebedeva; Svetlana Vassilevskaia; Elena Chebukina; Svetlana Koritova	United States; Liane Sato; Paula Weishoff; Yoko Zetterlund; Elaina Oden; Kimberley Oden; Teee Sanders; Caren Kemner; Ruth Lawanson; Tammy Liley; Janet Cobbs; Tara Cross-Battle; Lori Endicott

== Weightlifting ==
Event	Gold	Silver	Bronze
Flyweight –52 kg	Ivan Ivanov; Bulgaria	Lin Qisheng; China	Traian Cihărean; Romania
Bantamweight; 52–56 kg	Chun Byung-Kwan; South Korea	Liu Shoubin; China	Luo Jianming; China
Featherweight; 56–60 kg	Naim Süleymanoğlu; Turkey	Nikolay Peshalov; Bulgaria	He Yingqiang; China
Lightweight; 60–67.5 kg	Israel Militosyan; Unified Team	Yoto Yotov; Bulgaria	Andreas Behm; Germany
Middleweight; 67.5–75 kg	Fedor Kassapu; Unified Team	Pablo Lara; Cuba	Kim Myong-Nam; North Korea
Light-heavyweight; 75–82.5 kg	Pyrros Dimas; Greece	Krzysztof Siemion; Poland	none awarded^{[Note 1]}
Middle-heavyweight; 82.5–90 kg	Kakhi Kakhiashvili; Unified Team	Serguei Syrtsov; Unified Team	Sergiusz Wolczaniecki; Poland
First-heavyweight; 90-100 kg	Vikkor Tregubov; Unified Team	Timour Taimazov; Unified Team	Waldemar Malak; Poland
Heavyweight; 100-110 kg	Ronny Weller; Germany	Artour Akoev; Unified Team	Stefan Botev; Bulgaria
Super heavyweight +110 kg	Alexander Kurlovitch; Unified Team	Leonid Taranenko; Unified Team	Manfred Nerlinger; Germany

== Wrestling ==
=== Freestyle ===
Event	Gold	Silver	Bronze
48 kg	Kim Il; North Korea	Kim Jong-Shin; South Korea	Vougar Oroudjov; Unified Team
52 kg	Li Hak-Son; North Korea	Zeke Jones; United States	Valentin Yordanov; Bulgaria
57 kg	Alejandro Puerto; Cuba	Sergei Smal; Unified Team	Kim Yong-Sik; North Korea
62 kg	John Smith; United States	Askari Mohammadian; Iran	Lázaro Reinoso; Cuba
68 kg	Arsen Fadzayev; Unified Team	Valentin Getsov; Bulgaria	Kosei Akaishi; Japan
74 kg	Park Jang-Soon; South Korea	Kenny Monday; United States	Amir Reza Khadem; Iran
82 kg	Kevin Jackson; United States	Elmadi Jabrailov; Unified Team	Rasoul Khadem; Iran
90 kg	Makharbek Khadartsev; Unified Team	Kenan Şimşek; Turkey	Christopher Campbell; United States
100 kg	Leri Khabelov; Unified Team	Heiko Balz; Germany	Ali Kayalı; Turkey
130 kg	Bruce Baumgartner; United States	Jeffrey Thue; Canada	David Gobezhishvili; Unified Team

=== Greco-Roman ===
Event	Gold	Silver	Bronze
48 kg	Oleg Kucherenko; Unified Team	Vincenzo Maenza; Italy	Wilber Sánchez; Cuba
52 kg	Jon Rønningen; Norway	Alfred Ter-Mkrtychyan; Unified Team	Min Kyung-Gab; South Korea
57 kg	An Han-Bong; South Korea	Rifat Yildiz; Germany	Sheng Zetian; China
62 kg	Mehmet Akif Pirim; Turkey	Sergei Martynov; Unified Team	Juan Marén; Cuba
68 kg	Attila Repka; Hungary	Islam Dugushiev; Unified Team	Rodney Smith; United States
74 kg	Mnatsakan Iskandaryan; Unified Team	Józef Tracz; Poland	Torbjörn Kornbakk; Sweden
82 kg	Péter Farkas; Hungary	Piotr Stępień; Poland	Daulet Turlykhanov; Unified Team
90 kg	Maik Bullmann; Germany	Hakkı Başar; Turkey	Gogi Koguashvili; Unified Team
100 kg	Héctor Milián; Cuba	Dennis Koslowski; United States	Sergei Demyashkevich; Unified Team
130 kg	Alexander Karelin; Unified Team	Tomas Johansson; Sweden	Ioan Grigoraş; Romania

== Notes ==
1. Ibragim Samadov of the Unified Team was disqualified after he threw his medal onto the podium and walked out of the medal ceremony. The IOC decided not to award the medal to fourth-place finisher Chon Chol-ho of North Korea, as Samadov's offence had not been committed in the context of the competition.

== See also ==
- 1992 Summer Olympics medal table
