= Unified Team at the 1992 Summer Olympics =

- The team competed under the Olympic flag
- IOC code: EUN

in Barcelona, Catalonia, Spain
- Competitors: 475 (310 men and 165 women) in 27 sports
- Flag bearer: Aleksandr Karelin (Wrestling)
- Medals Ranked 1st: Gold 45 Silver 38 Bronze 29 Total 112

Summer Olympics appearances (overview)
- 1992

Other related appearances
- Russian Empire (1900–1912); Estonia (1920–1936, 1992–pres.); Latvia (1924–1936, 1992–pres.); Lithuania (1924–1928, 1992–pres.); Soviet Union (1952–1988); Armenia (1994–pres.); Belarus (1994–2020); Georgia (1994–pres.); Kazakhstan (1994–pres.); Kyrgyzstan (1994–pres.); Moldova (1994–pres.); Russia (1994–2016); Ukraine (1994–pres.); Uzbekistan (1994–pres.); Azerbaijan (1996–pres.); Tajikistan (1996–pres.); Turkmenistan (1996–pres.); ROC (2020); Individual Neutral Athletes (2024)

The Unified Team at the 1992 Summer Olympics (Russian: Объединенная команда на Летних Олимпийских играх 1992) in Barcelona, Spain, was a joint team consisting of twelve of the fifteen former Soviet republics that chose to compete together; the three other former states of Estonia, Latvia, and Lithuania competed separately. The team has been informally called the Commonwealth of Independent States team, though Georgia was not yet a member of the CIS when it competed as part of the Unified Team. Selected athletes from the Baltic states also competed on the Unified Team. It competed under the IOC country code EUN (from the French Équipe unifiée). A total of 475 competitors, 310 men and 165 women, took part in 234 events in 27 sports.

The team finished first in the medal rankings, edging its old rival the USA 45 to 37 in gold medals, and 112 to 108 in total medals.

The Unified Team's only other appearance was at the 1992 Winter Olympics.

== Members ==
- Armenia
- Azerbaijan
- Belarus
- Georgia
- Kazakhstan
- Kyrgyzstan
- Moldova
- Russia
- Tajikistan
- Turkmenistan
- Ukraine
- Uzbekistan

== Medals by summer sport ==
Sport	Gold	Silver	Bronze	Total
Artistic gymnastics	9	5	4	18
Athletics	7	11	3	21
Wrestling	6	5	5	16
Swimming	6	2	1	9
Weightlifting	5	4	0	9
Shooting	5	2	0	7
Judo	2	0	2	4
Fencing	1	2	2	5
Canoeing	1	1	0	2
Handball	1	0	1	2
Rhythmic gymnastics	1	0	1	2
Basketball	1	0	0	1
Diving	0	2	1	3
Boxing	0	1	1	2
Modern pentathlon	0	1	1	2
Volleyball	0	1	0	1
Archery	0	0	2	2
Tennis	0	0	2	2
Rowing	0	0	1	1
Water polo	0	0	1	1
Totals (20 entries)	45	37	28	110

== Medalists ==
Medal	Name	Nationality	Sport	Event	Date
Gold	Kanstantsin Lukashyk	Belarus	Shooting	Men's 50 metre pistol	26 July
Gold	Yevgeny Sadovyi	Russia	Swimming	Men's 200 metre freestyle	26 July
Gold	Yuri Fedkin	Russia	Shooting	Men's 10 metre air rifle	27 July
Gold	Marina Logvinenko	Russia	Shooting	Women's 25 metre pistol	27 July
Gold	Aleksey Kudryavtsev; Dmitry Lepikov; Yury Mukhin; Vladimir Pyshnenko; Yevgeny Sadovyi; Veniamin Tayanovich	Russia (all)	Swimming	Men's 4 × 200 metre freestyle relay	27 July
Gold	David Khakhaleishvili	Georgia	Judo	Men's +95 kg	27 July
Gold	Alexander Popov	Russia	Swimming	Men's 100 metre freestyle	28 July
Gold	Svetlana Boginskaya; Oksana Chusovitina; Rozalia Galiyeva; Yelena Grudneva; Tatiana Gutsu; Tatiana Lysenko	Belarus (Boginskaya); Russia (Grudneva); Ukraine (Gutsu and Lysenko); Uzbekistan (Galiyeva and Chusovitina)	Gymnastics	Women's artistic team all-around	28 July
Gold	Yevgeny Sadovyi	Russia	Swimming	Men's 400 metre freestyle	29 July
Gold	Yelena Rudkovskaya	Belarus	Swimming	Women's 100 metre breaststroke	29 July
Gold	Oleg Kutscherenko	Ukraine	Wrestling	Men's Greco-Roman 48 kg	29 July
Gold	Mnatsakan Iskandaryan	Armenia	Wrestling	Men's Greco-Roman 74 kg	29 July
Gold	Aleksandr Karelin	Russia	Wrestling	Men's Greco-Roman 130 kg	29 July
Gold	Israel Militosyan	Armenia	Weightlifting	Men's 67.5 kg	29 July
Gold	Valery Belenky; Ihor Korobchynskyi; Hrihoriy Misyutin; Vitaly Scherbo; Rustam Sharipov; Aleksey Voropayev	Azerbaijan (Belenky); Belarus (Scherbo); Russia (Voropaev); Ukraine (Korobchynskyi, Misyutin and Sharipov)	Gymnastics	Men's artistic team all-around	29 July
Gold	Alexander Popov	Russia	Swimming	Men's 50 metre freestyle	30 July
Gold	Tudor Casapu	Moldova	Weightlifting	Men's 75 kg	30 July
Gold	Tatiana Gutsu	Ukraine	Gymnastics	Women's artistic individual all-around	30 July
Gold	Hrachya Petikyan	Armenia	Shooting	Men's 50 metre rifle three positions	31 July
Gold	Vitaly Scherbo	Belarus	Gymnastics	Men's artistic individual all-around	31 July
Gold	Marina Logvinenko	Russia	Shooting	Women's 10 metre air pistol	1 August
Gold	Valentina Yegorova	Russia	Athletics	Women's marathon	1 August
Gold	Tatiana Lysenko	Ukraine	Gymnastics	Women's balance beam	1 August
Gold	Kakhi Kakhiashvili	Georgia	Weightlifting	Men's 90 kg	1 August
Gold	Andrey Abduvaliyev	Tajikistan	Athletics	Men's hammer throw	2 August
Gold	Vitaly Scherbo	Belarus	Gymnastics	Men's pommel horse	2 August
Gold	Yelena Romanova	Russia	Athletics	Women's 3000 metres	2 August
Gold	Viktor Tregubov	Russia	Weightlifting	Men's 100 kg	2 August
Gold	Vitaly Scherbo	Belarus	Gymnastics	Men's rings	2 August
Gold	Vitaly Scherbo	Belarus	Gymnastics	Men's vault	2 August
Gold	Nazim Huseynov	Azerbaijan	Judo	Men's 60 kg	2 August
Gold	Vitaly Scherbo	Belarus	Gymnastics	Men's parallel bars	2 August
Gold	Aleksandr Kurlovich	Belarus	Weightlifting	Men's +110 kg	4 August
Gold	Arsen Fadzaev	Russia	Wrestling	Men's freestyle 68 kg	5 August
Gold	Leri Khabelov	Georgia	Wrestling	Men's freestyle 100 kg	5 August
Gold	Aleksandr Maseykov; Dmitri Dovgalenok	Belarus (both)	Canoeing	Men's C-2 500 metres	7 August
Gold	Andrey Perlov	Russia	Athletics	Men's 50 kilometres walk	7 August
Gold	Maksim Tarasov	Russia	Athletics	Men's pole vault	7 August
Gold	Svetlana Krivelyova	Russia	Athletics	Women's shot put	7 August
Gold	Makharbek Khadartsev	Russia	Wrestling	Men's freestyle 90 kg	7 August
Gold	Vadym Gutzeit; Grigory Kiriyenko; Heorhiy Pohosov; Stanislav Pozdnyakov; Aleksandr Shirshov	Russia (Kiriyenko, Pozdnyakov and Shirshov); Ukraine (Gutzeit and Pohosov)	Fencing	Men's team sabre	7 August
Gold	Unified Team women's basketball team: (Kyrgyzstan) Elena Baranova; Elen Bunatyants; (Kazakhstan) Irina Gerlits; Yelena Khudashova; Irina Minkh; (Belarus) Yelena Shvaybovich; Irina Sumnikova; (Ukraine) Maryna Tkachenko; (Uzbekistan) Elena Tornikidou; Svetlana Antipova; Natalya Zasulskaya; (Ukraine) Olena Zhyrko	Russia (except those with a flag)	Basketball	Women's tournament	7 August
Gold	Alexandra Timoshenko	Ukraine	Gymnastics	Women's rhythmic individual all-around	8 August
Gold	Unified Team men's handball team: (Belarus) Andrey Barbashinsky; (Ukraine) Serhiy Bebeshko; (Kyrgyzstan) Talant Dujshebaev; (Ukraine) Yuri Gavrilov; Valery Gopin; Oleg Grebnev; (Belarus) Mikhail Yakimovich; Oleg Kiselyov; Vasily Kudinov; Andrey Lavrov; Igor Chumak; Igor Vasilyev	Russia (except those with a flag)	Handball	Men's tournament	8 August
Gold	(Ukraine) Olha Bryzhina (Ukraine) Lyudmyla Dzhyhalova; Olga Nazarova; Liliya Nurutdinova; Yelena Ruzina; Marina Shmonina	Russia (all except Bryzhina and Dzhyhalova)	Athletics	Women's 4 × 400 metres relay	8 August
Silver	Yelena Miroshina	Russia	Diving	Women's 10 metre platform	27 July
Silver	Sergei Pyzhianov	Russia	Shooting	Men's 10 metre air pistol	28 July
Silver	Vladimir Selkov	Russia	Swimming	Men's 200 metre backstroke	28 July
Silver	Alfred Ter-Mkrtchyan	Armenia	Wrestling	Men's Greco-Roman 52 kg	28 July
Silver	Islam Dugushiev	Russia	Wrestling	Men's Greco-Roman 68 kg	28 July
Silver	Anatoli Starostin; Dmitri Svatkovskiy; Eduard Zenovka	Russia (all)	Modern pentathlon	Men's team	29 July
Silver	Yuri Bashkatov; Pavlo Khnykin; Alexander Popov; Gennadiy Prigoda; Vladimir Pyshnenko; Veniamin Tayanovich	Moldova (Bashkatov); Russia (Prigoda, Popov, Pyshnenko and Tayanovich); Ukraine (Khnykin)	Swimming	Men's 4 × 100 metre freestyle relay	29 July
Silver	Sergey Martynov	Russia	Wrestling	Men's Greco-Roman 62 kg	30 July
Silver	Vasily Ivanov (Ukraine) Pavlo Khnykin; Vladislav Kulikov; Alexander Popov; Vladimir Pyshnenko; Vladimir Selkov; Dmitry Volkov	Russia (all except Khnykin)	Swimming	Men's 4 × 100 metre medley relay	31 July
Silver	Sergei Golubitsky	Ukraine	Fencing	Men's foil	31 July
Silver	Hrihoriy Misyutin	Ukraine	Gymnastics	Men's artistic individual all-around	31 July
Silver	Anatoly Asrabayev	Russia	Shooting	Men's 10 metre running target	1 August
Silver	Natalya Shikolenko	Belarus	Athletics	Women's javelin throw	1 August
Silver	Pavel Kolobkov	Russia	Fencing	Men's épée	1 August
Silver	Sergey Syrtsov	Russia	Weightlifting	Men's 90 kg	1 August
Silver	Tatiana Gutsu	Ukraine	Gymnastics	Women's uneven bars	1 August
Silver	Irina Lashko	Russia	Diving	Women's 3 metre springboard	2 August
Silver	Igor Astapkovich	Belarus	Athletics	Men's hammer throw	2 August
Silver	Hrihoriy Misyutin	Ukraine	Gymnastics	Men's floor	2 August
Silver	Tetyana Dorovskikh	Ukraine	Athletics	Women's 3000 metres	2 August
Silver	Irina Belova	Russia	Athletics	Women's heptathlon	2 August
Silver	Timur Taymazov	Ukraine	Weightlifting	Men's 100 kg	2 August
Silver	Hrihoriy Misyutin	Ukraine	Gymnastics	Men's vault	2 August
Silver	Hrihoriy Misyutin	Ukraine	Gymnastics	Men's horizontal bar	2 August
Silver	Liliya Nurutdinova	Russia	Athletics	Women's 800 metres	3 August
Silver	Yelena Nikolayeva	Russia	Athletics	Women's 10 kilometres walk	3 August
Silver	Artur Akoyev	Russia	Weightlifting	Men's 110 kg	3 August
Silver	Leonid Taranenko	Belarus	Weightlifting	Men's +110 kg	4 August
Silver	Olha Bryzhina	Ukraine	Athletics	Women's 400 metres	5 August
Silver	Mykhaylo Slyvynsky	Ukraine	Canoeing	Men's C-1 500 metres	7 August
Silver	Igor Trandenkov	Russia	Athletics	Men's pole vault	7 August
Silver	Inessa Kravets	Ukraine	Athletics	Women's long jump	7 August
Silver	Sergey Smal	Belarus	Wrestling	Men's freestyle 57 kg	7 August
Silver	Elmadi Zhabrailov	Russia	Wrestling	Men's freestyle 82 kg	7 August
Silver	Unified Team women's volleyball team: Yevgeniya Artamonova; Yelena Batukhtina; Svetlana Korytova; Natalya Morozova; Marina Pankova; Valentina Ogiyenko; Irina Smirnova; (Kazakhstan) Yelena Chebukina	Russia (all except Chebukina)	Volleyball	Women's tournament	7 August
Silver	Olga Bogoslovskaya; Galina Malchugina; Irina Privalova; Marina Trandenkova	Russia (all)	Athletics	Women's 4 × 100 metres relay	8 August
Silver	Lyudmila Rogachova	Russia	Athletics	Women's 1500 metres	8 August
Silver	Rostyslav Zaulychnyi	Ukraine	Boxing	Light heavyweight	9 August
Bronze	Sergey Demyashkevich	Belarus	Wrestling	Men's Greco-Roman 100 kg	28 July
Bronze	Dmitri Sergeyev	Russia	Judo	Men's 95 kg	28 July
Bronze	Eduard Zenovka	Russia	Modern pentathlon	Men's individual	29 July
Bronze	Dmitri Sautin	Russia	Diving	Men's 3 metre springboard	29 July
Bronze	Vladimir Vokhmyanin	Kazakhstan	Shooting	Men's 25 metre rapid fire pistol	30 July
Bronze	Olga Kirichenko; Natalya Meshcheryakova; Yelena Rudkovskaya; Yelena Shubina; Nina Zhivanevskaya	Belarus (Rudkovskaya); Russia (Meshcheryakova, Shubina and Zhivanevskaya); Ukraine (Kirichenko)	Swimming	Women's 4 × 100 metre medley relay	30 July
Bronze	Daulet Turlykhanov	Kazakhstan	Wrestling	Men's Greco-Roman 82 kg	30 July
Bronze	Gogi Koguashvili	Georgia	Wrestling	Men's Greco-Roman 90 kg	30 July
Bronze	Tatyana Sadovskaya	Russia	Fencing	Women's foil	30 July
Bronze	Yelena Petrova	Russia	Judo	Women's 61 kg	31 July
Bronze	Vyacheslav Lykho	Russia	Athletics	Men's shot put	31 July
Bronze	Valery Belenky	Azerbaijan	Gymnastics	Men's artistic individual all-around	31 July
Bronze	Irina Privalova	Russia	Athletics	Women's 100 metres	1 August
Bronze	Tatiana Lysenko	Ukraine	Gymnastics	Women's vault	1 August
Bronze	Tatiana Gutsu	Ukraine	Gymnastics	Women's floor	1 August
Bronze	Ekaterina Khodotovich; Yelena Khloptseva; Tetiana Ustiuzhanina; Antonina Zelikovich	Belarus (Khodotovich and Khloptseva); Russia (Zelikovich); Ukraine (Ustiuzhanina)	Rowing	Women's quadruple sculls	2 August
Bronze	Natalia Valeeva	Moldova	Archery	Women's individual	2 August
Bronze	Igor Nikulin	Russia	Athletics	Men's hammer throw	2 August
Bronze	Ihor Korobchynskyi	Ukraine	Gymnastics	Men's parallel bars	2 August
Bronze	Lyudmila Arzhannikova; Khatuna Kvrivishvili; Natalia Valeeva	Georgia (Kvirivishvili); Moldova (Valeeva); Ukraine (Arzhannikova)	Archery	Women's team	4 August
Bronze	Andrei Cherkasov	Russia	Tennis	Men's singles	6 August
Bronze	Leila Meskhi; Natasha Zvereva	Georgia (Meskhi); Belarus (Zvereva)	Tennis	Women's doubles	6 August
Bronze	Vugar Orujov	Belarus	Wrestling	Men's freestyle 48 kg	6 August
Bronze	David Gobejishvili	Georgia	Wrestling	Men's freestyle 130 kg	6 August
Bronze	Pavel Kolobkov; Sergey Kostarev (Ukraine) Serhiy Kravchuk; Andrey Shuvalov; Valery Zakharevich	Russia (all except Kravchuk)	Fencing	Men's team épée	6 August
Bronze	Ramaz Paliani	Georgia	Boxing	Featherweight	7 August
Bronze	Unified Team women's handball team: Natalya Anisimova; (Ukraine) Maryna Bazanova; Svetlana Bogdanova; Galina Borzenkova; Natalya Deryugina; Tatyana Dzhandzhgava; (Ukraine) Tetyana Horb; Lyudmila Gudz; Elina Guseva; Larisa Kiselyova; Natalya Morskova; Galina Onopriyenko; Svetlana Pryakhina	Russia (all except Bazanova and Horb)	Handball	Women's tournament	8 August
Bronze	Oksana Skaldina	Ukraine	Gymnastics	Women's rhythmic individual all-around	8 August
Bronze	Unified Team men's water polo team: Dmitry Apanasenko; (Ukraine) Andrey Belofastov; Yevgeny Sharonov; Dmitry Gorshkov; Vladimir Karabutov; Aleksandr Kolotov; (Ukraine) Andrei Kovalenko; Nikolay Kozlov; Serghei Marcoci; Sergey Naumov; Aleksandr Ogorodnikov; Alexander Tchigir; Aleksey Vdovin	Russia (all except Belofastov and Kovalenko)	Water polo	Men's tournament	9 August

== Competitors ==
The following is the list of number of competitors in the Games.

Sport	Men	Women	Total
Archery	3	3	6
Athletics	50	49	99
Badminton	1	1	2
Basketball	12	12	24
Boxing	12	–	12
Canoeing	15	4	19
Cycling	15	4	19
Diving	3	4	7
Equestrian	5	3	8
Fencing	15	5	20
Field hockey	15	0	15
Gymnastics	6	8	14
Handball	12	13	25
Judo	7	6	13
Modern pentathlon	3	–	3
Rowing	30	17	47
Sailing	12	2	14
Shooting	17	5	22
Swimming	18	11	29
Synchronized swimming	–	3	3
Table tennis	2	4	6
Tennis	2	3	5
Volleyball	12	8	20
Water polo	13	–	13
Weightlifting	10	–	10
Wrestling	20	–	20
Total	310	165	475

== Archery ==
The women earned two bronze medals, one from Natalia Valeeva's individual performance and another from the team competition. In the men's competition, however, defending bronze medallist Vladimir Echeev fell in the round of 16 along with one of the other male Unified Team members, while Vadim Chikarev advanced to the quarterfinal before being defeated.

Women's Individual Competition:

- Natalia Valeeva (Moldova) – Bronze Medal Match (→ Bronze Medal), 4–1
- Khatouna Kvrivishvili (Georgia) – Quarterfinal, 6th place (2–1)
- Lyudmila Arzhannikova (Ukraine) – Round of 32, 27th place (0–1)

Men's Individual Competition:

- Vadim Chikarev (Kazakhstan) – Quarterfinal, 7th place (2–1)
- Stanislav Zabrodski (Ukraine) – Round of 16, 10th place (1–1)
- Vladimir Echeev (Russia) – Round of 16, 11th place (1–1)

Women's Team Competition:

- Valeeva, Kvrivishvili, and Arzhannikova – Bronze Medal Match (→ Bronze Medal), 3–1

Men's Team Competition:

- Chikarev, Zabrodski, and Echeev – Quarterfinal, 8th place

== Athletics ==
=== Men's competition ===
Men's 5.000 metres

- Andrey Tikhonov (Russia)

- Heat – 13:44.67 (→ did not advance)

Men's 10.000 metres

- Oleg Strizhakov (Russia)

- Heat – 28:35.97 (→ did not advance)

Men's 4 × 400 m relay

- Dmitry Kosov, Dmitry Kliger, Dmitry Golovastov (3 – Russia), and Oleh Tverdokhlib (Ukraine)

- Heat – 3:05.59 (→ did not advance)

Men's marathon

- Yakov Tolstikov (Russia) — 2:17.04 (→ 22nd place)

Men's 400 m hurdles

- Oleh Tverdokhlib (Ukraine)

- Heat – 48.68
- Semifinal – 49.11
- Final – 48.63 (→ 6th place)

- Vadim Zadoynov (Moldova)

- Heat – 51.21 (→ did not advance)

Men's 20 km walk (all Russia)

- Mikhail Shchennikov — 1:27:17 (→ 12th place)
- Vladimir Andreyev — 1:28:25 (→ 13th place)
- Oleg Trochin — did not finish (→ no ranking)

Men's 50 km walk

- Andrey Perlov (Russia) — 3:50:13 (→ Gold Medal)
- Valeriy Spitsyn (Russia) — 3:54:39 (→ 4th place)
- Aleksandr Potashev (Belarus) — DSQ (→ no ranking)

Men's long jump (both Russia)

- Dmitriy Bagryanov

- Qualification – 8.09 m
- Final – 7.98 m (→ 7th place)

- Vadim Ivanov

- Qualification – 5.97 m (→ did not advance)

Men's triple jump

- Leonid Voloshin (Russia)

- Qualification – 17.21 m
- Final – 17.32 m (→ 4th place)

- Aleksandr Kovalenko (Belarus)

- Qualification – 16.93 m
- Final – 17.06 m (→ 7th place)

- Vasiliy Sokov (Russia)

- Qualification – 16.91 m
- Final – 16.86 m (→ 9th place)

Men's javelin throw

- Andrey Shevchuk (Russia)

- Qualification – 80.22 m
- Final – 77.74 m (→ 8th place)

- Viktor Zaitsev (Uzbekistan)

- Qualification – 79.12 m (→ did not advance)

- Dmitriy Polyunin (Uzbekistan)

- Qualification – 76.40 m (→ did not advance)

Men's hammer throw

- Andrey Abduvaliyev (Tajikistan)

- Qualification – 78.82 m
- Final – 82.54 m (→ Gold Medal)

- Igor Astapkovich (Belarus)

- Qualification – 76.50 m
- Final – 81.96 m (→ Silver Medal)

- Igor Nikulin (Russia)

- Qualification – 79.08 m
- Final – 81.38 m (→ Bronze Medal)

Men's shot put

- Vyacheslav Lykho (Russia)

- Qualification – 20.24 m
- Final – 20.94 m (→ Bronze Medal)

- Aleksandr Klimenko (Ukraine)

- Qualification – 20.16 m
- Final – 20.23 m (→ 8th place)

- Andrey Nemchninov (Ukraine)

- Qualification – 18.98 m (→ did not advance)

Men's discus throw

- Dmitriy Kovtsun (Ukraine)

- Qualification – 61.62 m
- Final – 62.04 m (→ 7th place)

- Dmitriy Shevchenko (Russia)

- Qualification – 60.22 m
- Final – 61.78 m (→ 8th place)

- Volodymyr Zinchenko (Ukraine)

- Qualification – 56.94 m (→ did not advance)

=== Women's competition ===
Women's 800 metres

- Liliya Nurutdinova (Russia)

- Heat – 2:00.37
- Semifinal – 1:58.04
- Final – 1:55.99 (→ Silver Medal)

- Inna Yevseyeva (Ukraine)

- Heat – 1:58.58
- Semifinal – 1:58.20
- Final – 1:57.20 (→ 4th place)

- Lyubov Gurina (Russia)

- Heat – 2:00.27
- Semifinal – 2:00.64
- Final – 1:58.13 (→ 8th place)

Women's 10.000 metres

- Lyudmila Matveyeva (Russia)

- Heat – 33:23.02 (→ did not advance)

- Yelena Zhupiyeva-Vyazova (Ukraine)

- Heat – did not finish (→ did not advance)

- Olga Bondarenko (Russia)

- Heat – did not finish (→ did not advance)

Women's 400 m hurdles

- Tatyana Ledovskaya (Belarus)

- Heat – 55.03
- Semifinal – 54.53
- Final – 54.31 (→ 4th place)

- Vera Ordina (Russia)

- Heat – 55.25
- Semifinal – 54.37
- Final – 54.83 (→ 5th place)

- Margarita Ponomaryova (Russia)

- Heat – 55.36
- Semifinal – 53.98
- Final – 54.83 (→ 6th place)

Women's 10 km walk (all Russia)

- Yelena Nikolayeva

- Final – 44:33 (→ Silver Medal)

- Yelena Sayko

- Final – 45:23 (→ 8th place)

- Alina Ivanova

- Final – DSQ (→ no ranking)

Women's marathon

- Valentina Yegorova (Russia) — 2:32.41 (→ Gold Medal)
- Ramilya Burangulova (Russia) — 2:38.46 (→ 8th place)
- Madina Biktagirova (Belarus) — disqualified

Women's long jump

- Inessa Kravets (Ukraine)

- Heat – 6.79 m
- Final – 7.12 m (→ Silver Medal)

- Irina Mushailova (Russia)

- Heat – 6.86 m
- Final – 6.68 m (→ 5th place)

Women's high jump

- Olga Turchak (Kazakhstan)

- Qualification – 1.92 m
- Final – 1.83 m (→ 13th place)

- Tatyana Shevchik (Belarus)

- Qualification – 1.92 m
- Final – 1.83 m (→ 16th place)

- Olga Bolshova (Moldova)

- Qualification – 1.83 m (→ did not advance)

Women's javelin throw

- Natalya Shikolenko (Belarus)

- Heat – 67.36m
- Final – 68.26m (→ Silver Medal)

- Yelena Svezhentseva (Uzbekistan)

- Heat – 60.44m
- Final – 57.32m (→ 9th place)

- Irina Kostyuchenkova (Ukraine)

- Heat – 57.96 (→ 20th place)

Women's discus throw

- Larisa Korotkevich (Russia)

- Heat – 67.62m
- Final – 65.52m (→ 4th place)

- Olga Burova (Russia)

- Heat – 64.68m
- Final – 64.02m (→ 5th place)

- Irina Yatchenko (Belarus)

- Heat – 61.60m
- Final – 63.74m (→ 7th place)

== Basketball ==
=== Men's team competition ===
- Preliminary round (group B)

- Defeated Venezuela (78–64)
- Defeated Australia (85–63)
- Defeated PR China (100–84)
- Defeated Lithuania (92–80)
- Lost to Puerto Rico (70–82)

- Quarterfinals

- Defeated Germany (83–76)

- Semifinals

- Lost to Croatia (74–75)

- Bronze medal match

- Lost to Lithuania (78–82) → 4th place

- Team roster

- Sergey Bazarevich (Russia)
- Aleksandr Volkov (Ukraine)
- Aleksandr Belostenny (Ukraine)
- Dmitry Sukharev (Tajikistan)
- Elchad Gadashev (Azerbaijan)
- Gundars Vētra (Latvia)
- Igors Miglenieks (Latvia)
- Sergey Panov (Russia)
- Valery Tikhonenko (Kazakhstan)
- Viktor Berezhnoy (Ukraine)
- Vitaly Nosov (Russia)
- Vladimir Gorin (Russia)

=== Women's team competition ===
- Preliminary round (group A)

- Lost to Cuba (89–91)
- Defeated Italy (79–67)
- Defeated Brazil (76–64)

- Semifinals

- Defeated United States (79–73)

- Final

- Defeated PR China (76–66) → Gold Medal

- Team roster (mostly Russia)

- Yelena Baranova
- Elen Bunatyants
- Irina Gerlits (Kazakhstan)
- Yelena Khudashova
- Irina Minkh
- Yelena Shvaybovich (Belarus)
- Irina Sumnikova
- Marina Tkachenko (Ukraine)
- Yelena Tornikidu (Uzbekistan)
- Svetlana Zaboluyeva
- Natalya Zasulskaya
- Yelena Zhirko (Ukraine)

== Boxing ==
Men's Light-Flyweight (– 48 kg)

- Vladimir Ganchenko (Ukraine)

- First round – Lost to Pál Lakatos (HUN), RSC-2 (01:27)

Men's Flyweight (– 51 kg)

- Anatoly Filippov (Russia)

- First round – Lost to Yacin Chikh (ALG), 3:5

Men's Bantamweight (– 54 kg)

- Vladislav Antonov (Russia)

- First round – Lost to Chatree Suwanyod (THA), 4:6

Men's Featherweight (– 57 kg)

- Ramaz Paliani (Georgia) → Bronze Medal

- First round – Defeated Julian Wheeler (USA), 8:4
- Second round – Defeated Rogerio Brito (BRA), 19:2
- Quarterfinals — Defeated Daniel Dumitrescu (ROM), 11:5
- Semifinals — Lost to Faustino Reyes (ESP), 9:14

Men's Lightweight (– 60 kg)

- Artur Grigoryan (Uzbekistan)

- First round – Defeated Óscar Palomino (ESP), 11:10
- Second round – Lost to Hong Sung-Sik (KOR), 3:9

Men's Light-Welterweight (– 63.5 kg)

- Oleg Nikolayev

- First round – Bye
- Second round – Defeated Hubert Tinge Meta (PNG), 17:2
- Quarterfinals — Lost to Héctor Vinent (CUB), 3:26

Men's Welterweight (– 67 kg)

- Andrey Pestryayev (Russia)

- First round – Lost to Vitalijus Karpaciauskas (LTU), 4:9

Men's Light-Middleweight (– 71 kg)

- Arkady Topayev (Kazakhstan)

- First round – Lost to Juan Carlos Lemus (CUB), 0:11

Men's Middleweight (– 75 kg)

- Aleksandr Lebziak (Russia)

- First round – Defeated Justann Crawford (AUS), RSCH-3 (01:56)
- Second round – Lost to Chris Byrd (USA), 7:16

Men's Light-Heavyweight (– 81 kg)

- Rostislav Zaulichniy (Ukraine) → Silver Medal

- First round – Bye
- Second round – Defeated Jacklord Jacobs (NGA), 16:8
- Quarterfinals — Defeated Stephen Wilson (GBR), 13:0
- Semifinals — Defeated Zoltán Béres (HUN), RSC-3 (02:51)
- Final – Lost to Torsten May (GER), 3:8

Men's Heavyweight (– 91 kg)

- Aleksey Chudinov (Russia)

- First round – Defeated Vidas Markevičius (LTU), 7:3
- Second round – Lost to Paul Douglas (IRL), 9:15

Men's Super-Heavyweight (+ 91 kg)

- Nikolay Kulpin (Kazakhstan)

- First round – Bye
- Second round – Lost to Larry Donald (USA), RSCI-3 (00:02)

== Cycling ==
Nineteen cyclists, fifteen men and four women, represented the Unified Team in 1992.

Men's road race

- Svyatoslav Ryabushenko
- Petro Koshelenko
- Aleksey Bochkov

Men's team time trial

- Igor Dzyuba
- Oleh Halkin (Ukraine)
- Igor Pastukhovich
- Igor Patenko (Belarus)

Men's sprint

- Nikolay Kovsh (Russia)

Men's 1 km time trial

- Aleksandr Kirichenko (Ukraine)

Men's individual pursuit

- Oleksandr Honchenkov (Ukraine)

Men's team pursuit

- Valery Batura
- Oleksandr Honchenkov (Ukraine)
- Dmitry Nelyubin (Russia)
- Roman Saprykin
- Nikolay Kuznetsov (Russia)

Men's points race

- Vasyl Yakovlev (Ukraine)

Women's road race

- Natalya Kyschuk (Ukraine) — 2:05:03 (→ 4th place)
- Zinaida Stagourskaya (Belarus) — 2:05:03 (→ 16th place)
- Svetlana Samochvalova (Russia) — did not finish (→ no ranking)

Women's sprint

- Galina Yenyukhina (Russia)

Women's individual pursuit

- Svetlana Samokhvalova (Russia)

== Diving ==
Men's 3 m Springboard

- Dmitri Sautin

- Preliminary round – 384.42 points
- Final – 627.78 points (→ Bronze Medal)

- Valery Statsenko

- Preliminary round – 388.26 points
- Final – 577.92 points (→ 8th place)

Men's 10 m Platform

- Dmitri Sautin

- Preliminary round – 389.28 points
- Final – 565.95 points (→ 6th place)

- Georgy Chogovadze (Georgia)

- Preliminary round – 361.47 (→ did not advance, 16th place)

Women's 3 m Springboard

- Irina Lashko

- Preliminary round – 334.89 points
- Final – 514.14 points (→ Silver Medal)

- Vera Ilyina

- Preliminary round – 290.46 points
- Final – 470.67 points (→ 6th place)

Women's 10 m Platform

- Yelena Miroshina

- Final – 411.63 points (→ Silver Medal)

- Inga Afonina

- Final – 398.43 points (→ 5th place)

== Fencing ==
20 fencers, 15 men and 5 women represented the Unified Team in 1992.

Men's foil

- Serhiy Holubytskiy
- Dmitry Shevchenko
- Vyacheslav Grigoryev

Men's team foil

- Dmitry Shevchenko, Serhiy Holubytskiy, Vyacheslav Grigoryev, Anvar Ibragimov, Ilgar Mamedov

Men's épée

- Pavel Kolobkov
- Andrey Shuvalov
- Serhiy Kravchuk

Men's team épée

- Pavel Kolobkov, Andrey Shuvalov, Serhiy Kravchuk, Sergey Kostarev, Valery Zakharevich

Men's sabre

- Grigory Kiriyenko
- Aleksandr Shirshov
- Heorhiy Pohosov

Men's team sabre

- Grigory Kiriyenko, Aleksandr Shirshov, Heorhiy Pohosov, Vadym Huttsait, Stanislav Pozdnyakov

Women's foil

- Tatyana Sadovskaya
- Olga Velichko
- Yelena Glikina

Women's team foil

- Yelena Glikina, Yelena Grishina, Tatyana Sadovskaya, Olga Velichko, Olga Voshchakina

== Handball ==
=== Men's team competition ===
- Preliminary round (group B)

- Unified team – Germany 25–15
- Unified team – France 23–22
- Unified team – Egypt 22–18
- Unified team – Spain 24–18
- Unified team – Romania 27–25

- Semi Finals

- Unified team – Iceland 23–19

- Final

- Unified team – Sweden 22–20 (→ Gold Medal)

- Team roster

- Andrey Barbashinsky
- Sergey Bebeshko
- Talant Duishebayev
- Dmitry Filipov
- Yuri Gavrilov
- Valery Gopin
- Vyacheslav Gorpixin
- Oleg Grebnev
- Mikhail Yakimovich
- Oleg Kiselyev
- Vasily Kudinov
- Andrey Lavrov
- Andrey Minevski
- Igor Chumak
- Igor Vassiliyev

- Head coach: Spartak Mironvich

=== Women's team competition ===
- Preliminary round (group A)

- Unified team – United States 23–16
- Unified team – Nigeria 26–18
- Unified team – Germany 28–22

- Semi Finals

- Unified team – Norway 20–23

- Bronze medal match

- Unified team – Germany 24–20 (→ Bronze Medal)

- Team roster

- Natalya Anisimova
- Maryna Bazhanova
- Svetlana Bogdanova
- Galina Borzenkova
- Natalya Deryugina
- Tatyana Dzhandzhgava
- Lyudmila Gudz
- Elina Guseva
- Tetyana Horb
- Larissa Kiseleva
- Natalya Morskova
- Galina Onoprienko
- Svetlana Pryakhina

- Head coach: Alexandre Tarassikov

== Modern pentathlon ==
Three male pentathletes represented the Unified Team in 1992. They won silver in the team event and Eduard Zenovka won an individual bronze.

Individual

- Eduard Zenovka
- Anatoly Starostin
- Dmitry Svatkovsky

Team

- Eduard Zenovka, Anatoly Starostin, Dmitry Svatkovsky

== Rowing ==
Rowing events, results, and competitors:

Men's single sculls – 17th place
Ihor Mohylniy

Men's double sculls – 12th place
Oleksandr Slobodeniuk, Leonid Shaposhnykov

Men's coxless pair – 15th place
Yury Pimenov, Nikolay Pimenov

Men's coxed pair – 11th place
Valery Belodedov, Dmitry Nos, Anatoly Korbut

Men's quadruple sculls – 7th place
Valeriy Dosenko, Sergey Kinyakin, Mykola Chupryna, Girts Vilks

Men's coxless four – 10th place
Viktor Pitirimov, Roman Monchenko, Vladimir Sokolov, Vadim Yunash

Men's coxed four – 6th place
Veniamin But, Igor Bortnitsky, Vladimir Romanishin, Gennadi Kryuçkin, Pyotr Petrinich

Men's eight – 10th place
Vitaliy Raievskiy, Alexandru Britov, Yevgeny Kislyakov, Aleksandr Anikeyev, Sergey Korotkikh, Oleg Sveshnikov, Vasily Tikhonov, Stepan Dmitriyevsky, Igor Shkaberin

Women's double sculls – 6th place
Sariya Zakyrova, Inna Frolova

Women's coxless pair – 8th place
Hanna Motrechko, Olena Ronzhyna-Morozova

Women's quadruple sculls – 3rd place ( Bronze medal)
Yekaterina Khodatovich-Karsten, Antonina Makhina-Dumcheva-Zelikovich, Tetiana Ustiuzhanina, Yelena Khloptseva

Women's eight – 4th place
Svitlana Fil, Marina Znak, Irina Gribko, Sarmīte Stone, Marina Suprun, Nataliya Stasyuk, Nataliya Grigoryeva, Yekaterina Kotko, Yelena Medvedeva

== Sailing ==
Women's 470 Class

- Larisa Moskalenko and Olena Pakholchyk

- Final Ranking — 43.0 points (→ 4th place)

== Swimming ==
Men's 50 m Freestyle

- Alexander Popov
  1. Heat – 22.21
  2. Final – 21.91 (→ Gold Medal)
- Gennadiy Prigoda
  1. Heat – 22.57
  2. Final – 22.54 (→ 7th place)

Men's 100 m Freestyle

- Alexander Popov
  1. Heat – 49.29
  2. Final – 49.02 (→ Gold Medal)
- Gennadiy Prigoda
  1. Heat – 50.00
  2. Final – 50.25 (→ 8th place)

Men's 200 m Freestyle

- Yevgeny Sadovyi
  1. Heat – 1:46.74
  2. Final – 1:46.70 (→ Gold Medal)
- Vladimir Pyshnenko
  1. Heat – 1:47.94
  2. Final – 1:48.32 (→ 5th place)

Men's 400 m Freestyle

- Yevgeny Sadovyi
  1. Heat – 3:49.37
  2. Final – 3:45.00 (→ Gold Medal)
- Aleksey Kudryavtsev
  1. Heat – 3:57.07 (→ did not advance, 22nd place)

Men's 1500 m Freestyle

- Viktor Andreyev
  1. Heat – 15:21.43
  2. Final – 15:33.94 (→ 8th place)

Men's 100 m Backstroke

- Vladimir Selkov
  1. Heat – 55.72
  2. Final – 55.49 (→ 5th place)

Men's 200 m Backstroke

- Vladimir Selkov
  1. Heat – 1:59.81
  2. Final – 1:58.87 (→ Silver Medal)

Men's 100 m Breaststroke

- Vasily Ivanov
  1. Heat – 1:01.91
  2. Final – 1:01.87 (→ 5th place)
- Dmitri Volkov
  1. Heat – 1:01.74
  2. Final – 1:02.07 (→ 6th place)

Men's 200 m Breaststroke

- Aleksandr Savitsky
  1. Heat – 2:24.58 (→ did not advance, 38th place)

Men's 100 m Butterfly

- Pavel Khnykin
  1. Heat – 54.02
  2. Final – 53.81 (→ 4th place)
- Vladislav Kulikov
  1. Heat – 54.23
  2. Final – 54.26 (→ 8th place)

Men's 200 m Butterfly

- Denis Pankratov
  1. Heat – 1:59.00
  2. Final – 1:58.98 (→ 6th place)

Men's 200 m Individual Medley

- Serghei Mariniuc (Moldova)
  1. Heat – 2:04.23
  2. B-Final – 2:03.72 (→ 10th place)
- Aleksandr Savitsky
  1. Heat – 2:05.09 (→ did not advance, 19th place)

Men's 400 m Individual Medley

- Serghei Mariniuc (Moldova)
  1. Heat – 4:19.05
  2. Final – 4:22.93 (→ 7th place)

Men's 4 × 100 m Freestyle Relay

- Pavel Khnykin, Yuriy Bashkatov, Vladimir Pyshnenko, and Venyamin Tayanovich
  1. Heat – 3:17.48
- Pavel Khnykin, Gennadiy Prigoda, Yuriy Bashkatov, and Alexander Popov
  1. Final – 3:17.56 (→ Silver Medal)

Men's 4 × 200 m Freestyle Relay

- Dmitry Lepikov, Aleksey Kudryavtsev, Yury Mukhin, and Veniamin Tayanovich
  1. Heat – 7:17.65
- Dmitry Lepikov, Vladimir Pyshnenko, Veniamin Tayanovich, and Yevgeny Sadovyi
  1. Final – 7:11.95 (→ WR and Gold Medal)

Men's 4 × 100 m Medley Relay

- Pavel Khnykin, Dmitri Volkov, Vladislav Kulikov, and Vladimir Pyshnenko
  1. Heat – 3:42.22
- Vladimir Selkov, Vasily Ivanov, Pavel Khnykin, and Alexander Popov
  1. Final – 3:38.56 (→ Silver Medal)

Women's 50 m Freestyle

- Natalya Meshcheryakova
  1. Heat – 25.89
  2. Final – 25.47 (→ 6th place)
- Yevgenia Yermakova
  1. Heat – 26.45
  2. B-Final – 26.49 (→ 14th place)

Women's 100 m Freestyle

- Yelena Choubina
  1. Heat – 56.31
  2. B-Final – 56.19 (→ 11th place)
- Yevgenia Yermakova
  1. Heat – 56.67
  2. B-Final – 56.66 (→ 14th place)

Women's 200 m Freestyle

- Olga Kirichenko
  1. Heat – 2:00.67
  2. Final – 2:00.90 (→ 7th place)
- Yelena Dendeberova
  1. Heat – 2:01.28
  2. B-Final – 2:00.09 (→ 9th place)

Women's 100 m Backstroke

- Nina Zhivanevskaya
  1. Heat – 1:02.25
  2. Final – 1:02.36 (→ 7th place)
- Natalia Chibaeva
  1. Heat – 1:05.08 (→ did not advance, 26th place)

Women's 200 m Backstroke

- Nina Zhivanevskaya
  1. Heat – 2:14.34
  2. Final – 2:17.61 (→ 14th place)
- Natalia Chibaeva
  1. Heat – 2:20.52 (→ did not advance, 33rd place)

Women's 100 m Breaststroke

- Elena Roudkovskaya
  1. Heat – 1:08.75
  2. Final – 1:08.00 (→ Gold Medal)
- Yelena Volkova
  1. Heat – 1:12.46 (→ did not advance, 20th place)

Women's 200 m Breaststroke

- Elena Roudkovskaya
  1. Heat – 2:28.24
  2. Final – 2:28.47 (→ 4th place)
- Yelena Volkova
  1. Heat – 2:32.39
  2. B-Final – 2:37.65 (→ 16th place)

Women's 100 m Butterfly

- Olga Kirichenko
  1. Heat – 1:01.78
  2. B-Final – DNS (→ no ranking)
- Natalia Yacovleva
  1. Heat – 1:03.18 (→ did not advance, 29th place)

Women's 200 m Butterfly

- Natalia Yacovleva
  1. Heat – 2:19.02 (→ did not advance, 22nd place)

Women's 200 m Individual Medley

- Yelena Dendeberova
  1. Heat – 2:17.13
  2. Final – 2:15.47 (→ 4th place)

Women's 4 × 100 m Freestyle Relay

- Natalya Meshcheryakova, Svetlana Leshukova, Yelena Dendeberova, and Yevgenia Yermakova
  1. Heat – 3:45.06
- Natalya Meshcheryakova, Svetlana Leshukova, Yelena Dendeberova, and Yelena Choubina
  1. Final – 3:43.68 (→ 4th place)

Women's 4 × 100 m Medley Relay

- Nina Zhivanevskaya, Elena Roudkovskaya, Olga Kirichenko, and Yelena Choubina
  1. Heat – 4:10.37
- Nina Zhivanevskaya, Elena Roudkovskaya, Olga Kirichenko, and Natalya Meshcheryakova
  1. Final – 4:06.44 (→ Bronze Medal)

== Synchronized swimming ==
Three synchronized swimmers represented the Unified Team in 1992.

Women's solo

- Olga Sedakova
- Anna Kozlova
- Yelena Dolzhenko

Women's duet

- Olga Sedakova
- Anna Kozlova

== Tennis ==
Men's singles competition

Athlete	Event	Round 1	Round 2	Round 3	Quarter-finals	Semi-finals	Final	Rank
Athlete	Event	Opposition Score	Opposition Score	Opposition Score	Opposition Score	Opposition Score	Opposition Score	Rank
Andrei Cherkasov	Singles	R. Smith (BAH); W 6–1, 6–0, 3–6, 6–1	Goran Prpić (CRO); W 6–4, 6–7, 6–4, 6–3	P. Sampras (USA); W 6–7, 1–6, 7–5, 6–0, 6–3	J. Oncins (BRA); W 6–1, 6–4, 6–7, 4–6, 6–2	J. Arrese (ESP); L 4–6, 6–7, 6–3, 3–6	Did not advance	Bronze
Andrei Chesnokov	Singles	S. Edberg (SWE); W 6–0, 6–4, 6–4	R. Furlan (ITA); L 6–7, 4–6, 4–6	Did not advance				—

Women's singles competition

Athlete	Event	Round 1	Round 2	Round 3	Quarter-finals	Semi-finals	Final	Rank
Athlete	Event	Opposition Score	Opposition Score	Opposition Score	Opposition Score	Opposition Score	Opposition Score	Rank
Eugenia Maniokova	Singles	P. Ritter (AUT); W 6–1, 7–6	K. Maleeva (BUL); W 7–6, 4–6, 6–0	S. Appelmans (BEL); L 1–6, 3–6	Did not advance			—
Leila Meskhi (Georgia)	Singles	M. Pierce (FRA); L 6–7, 5–7	Did not advance					—
Natasha Zvereva	Singles	J. Novotná (TCH); W 6–1, 6–0	S. Smith (GBR); W 6–1, 6–2	M.J. Fernández (USA); L 6–7, 1–6	Did not advance			—
Leila Meskhi; Natasha Zvereva	Doubles	—N/a	K. Maleeva / M. Maleeva (BUL); W Walkover	Ritter / Wiesner (AUT); W 6–1, 6–1	Paz / Tarabini (ARG); W 6–2, 6–3	G. Fernández / M.J. Fernández (USA); L 4–6, 5–7	Did not advance	Bronze

== Volleyball ==
=== Women's team competition ===
- Preliminary round (group B)

- Defeated Spain (3–0)
- Lost to United States (2-3)
- Defeated Japan (3–0)

- Semifinals

- Defeated Brazil (3–1)

- Final

- Lost to Cuba (1–3) → Silver Medal

- Team roster

- Valentina Ogienko
- Natalya Morozova
- Marina Nikoulina
- Elena Tyurina
- Irina Smirnova
- Tatyana Sidorenko
- Tatyana Menchova
- Evgenya Artamonova
- Galina Lebedeva
- Svetlana Vassilevskaya
- Yelena Tcheboukina
- Svetlana Koritova

== Water polo ==
=== Men's team competition ===
- Team roster

- Dmitry Apanasenko
- Andrey Belofastov
- Yevgeny Sharonov
- Dmitry Gorshkov
- Vladimir Karabutov
- Aleksandr Kolotov
- Andriy Kovalenko
- Nikolay Kozlov
- Sergey Markoch
- Sergey Naumov
- Aleksandr Ogorodnikov
- Aleksandr Chigir
- Aleksey Vdovin

== Weightlifting ==
Weightlifting events, results, and competitors:

Men's Lightweight (– 67.5 kg)

- Israel Militosyan – 1st place ( Gold medal)

Men's Middleweight (– 75 kg)

- Tudor Casapu (Moldova) – 1st place ( Gold medal)

Men's Light-Heavyweight (– 82.5 kg)

- Ibragim Samadov

Men's Middle-Heavyweight (– 90 kg)

- Akakios Kakiasvili (Georgia) – 1st place ( Gold medal)
- Sergey Syrtsov – 2nd place ( Silver medal)

Men's Heavyweight I (– 100 kg)

- Viktor Tregubov – 1st place ( Gold medal)
- Tymur Taimazov – 2nd place ( Silver medal)

Men's Heavyweight II (– 110 kg)

- Artur Akoyev – 2nd place ( Silver medal)

Men's Super-Heavyweight (+110 kg)

- Aleksandr Kurlovich – 1st place ( Gold medal)
- Leonid Taranenko – 2nd place ( Silver medal)

== Wrestling ==
Wrestling events (Freestyle and Greco-Roman), results, and competitors:

=== Freestyle ===
Men's freestyle 48 kg (light-flyweight)

- Vugar Orujov – 3rd place ( Bronze medal)

Men's freestyle 52 kg (flyweight)

- Volodymyr Tohuzov

Men's freestyle 57 kg (bantamweight)

- Sergey Smal – 2nd place ( Silver medal)

Men's freestyle 62 kg (featherweight)

- Magomed Azizov – 5th place

Men's freestyle 68 kg (lightweight)

- Arsen Fadzayev – 1st place ( Gold medal)

Men's freestyle 74 kg (welterweight)

- Magomedsalam Gadzhiev– 4th place

Men's freestyle 82 kg (middleweight)

- Elmadi Jabrailov – 2nd place ( Silver medal)

Men's freestyle 90 kg (light-heavyweight)

- Makharbek Khadartsev – 1st place ( Gold medal)

Men's freestyle 100 kg (heavyweight)

- Leri Khabelov – 1st place ( Gold medal)

Men's freestyle 130 kg (super-heavyweight)

- David Gobezhishvili (Georgia) – 3rd place ( Bronze medal)

=== Greco-Roman ===
Men's Greco-Roman 48 kg (light-flyweight)

- Oleg Kucherenko – 1st place ( Gold medal)

Men's Greco-Roman 52 kg (flyweight)

- Alfred Ter-Mkrtychyan – 2nd place ( Silver medal)

Men's Greco-Roman 57 kg (bantamweight)

- Aleksandr Ignatenko – 4th place

Men's Greco-Roman 62 kg (featherweight)

- Sergey Martynov – 2nd place ( Silver medal)

Men's Greco-Roman 68 kg (lightweight)

- Islam Dugushiev – 2nd place ( Silver medal)

Men's Greco-Roman 74 kg (welterweight)

- Mnatsakan Iskandaryan – 1st place ( Gold medal)

Men's Greco-Roman 82 kg (middleweight)

- Daulet Turlykhanov – 3rd place ( Bronze medal)

Men's Greco-Roman 90 kg (light-heavyweight)

- Gogi Koguashvili (Georgia) – 3rd place ( Bronze medal)

Men's Greco-Roman 100 kg (heavyweight)

- Sergey Demyashkevich – 3rd place ( Bronze medal)

Men's Greco-Roman 130 kg (super-heavyweight)

- Aleksandr Karelin – 1st place ( Gold medal)
