= Handball at the 1992 Summer Olympics =

Tournament details
- Host country: Spain
- Venues: 2 (in 2 host cities)
- Dates: 27 July – 8 August 1992
- Teams: 20 (from 4 confederations)

Final positions
- Champions: Unified Team (men); South Korea (women)
- Runners-up: Sweden (men); Norway (women)
- Third place: France (men); Unified Team
- Fourth place: Iceland (men); Germany (women)

Final results for the handball competition at the 1992 Summer Olympics:

== Medal summary ==
Event	Gold	Silver	Bronze
Men	Unified Team; Andrey Barbashinsky; Serhiy Bebeshko; Igor Chumak; Talant Duyshebaev; Dmitry Filippov; Yuriy Gavrilov; Valery Gopin; Vyacheslav Gorpishin; Oleg Grebnev; Oleg Kiselyov; Vasily Kudinov; Andrey Lavrov; Igor Vasilyev; Mikhail Yakimovich; Andrey Minevsky	Sweden; Magnus Andersson; Robert Andersson; Anders Bäckegren; Per Carlén; Magnus Cato; Erik Hajas; Robert Hedin; Patrik Liljestrand; Ola Lindgren; Mats Olsson; Staffan Olsson; Axel Sjöblad; Tommy Suoraniemi; Tomas Svensson; Pierre Thorsson; Magnus Wislander	France; Philippe Debureau; Philippe Gardent; Denis Lathoud; Pascal Mahé; Philippe Médard; Gaël Monthurel; Laurent Munier; Frédéric Perez; Alain Portes; Thierry Perreux; Éric Quintin; Jackson Richardson; Stéphane Stoecklin; Jean-Luc Thiébaut; Denis Tristant; Frédéric Volle
Women	South Korea; Cha Jae-Kyung; Han Hyun-Sook; Han Sun-Hee; Hong Jeong-ho; Jang Ri-Ra; Kim Hwa-Sook; Lee Ho-Youn; Lee Mi-Young; Lim O-Kyeong; Min Hye-Sook; Moon Hyang-Ja; Nam Eun-Young; Oh Sung-Ok; Park Jeong-Lim; Park Kap-Sook	Norway; Hege Kirsti Frøseth; Tonje Sagstuen; Hanne Hogness; Heidi Sundal; Susann Goksør; Cathrine Svendsen; Mona Dahle; Siri Eftedal; Henriette Henriksen; Ingrid Steen; Karin Pettersen; Annette Skotvoll; Kristine Duvholt; Heidi Tjugum	Unified Team; Natalya Anisimova; Maryna Bazhanova; Svetlana Bogdanova; Galina Borzenkova; Natalya Deryugina; Tatyana Dzhandzhgava; Lyudmila Gudz; Elina Guseva; Tetyana Horb; Larisa Kiselyova; Natalya Morskova; Galina Onopriyenko; Svetlana Pryakhina; Raisa Verakso; Svetlana Rozintseva
