= Nataliya Yakovleva =

Nataliya Yakovleva may refer to:

- Natalya Yakovleva (handballer) (born 1986), team handball player from Kazakhstan
- Nataliya Yakovleva (swimmer) (born 1971), Russian swimmer
