= Igor Vasilyev =

Igor Vasilyev may refer to:

- Igor Vasilyev (handballer)
- Igor Vasilyev (politician)
