= Vdovin =

Vdovin (masculine, Russian: Вдовин) or Vdovina (feminine, Russian: Вдовина) is a Russian surname. Notable people with the surname include:

Vdovin:

- Aleksey Vdovin (1963–2022), Russian water polo player
- Andrey Vdovin (born 1994), Russian sprinter
- Mikhail Vdovin (born 1967), Russian sprinter

Vdovina:

- Daria Vdovina (born 1989), Russian sport shooter
- Kseniya Vdovina (born 1987), Russian sprinter
