= Kim Hwa-sook =

South Korean handball player (born 1971)

Medal record

Representing South Korea

Women's handball

Olympic Games
Gold medal – first place	1992 Barcelona	Team

Kim Hwa-Sook (Korean: 김화숙; born March 2, 1971) is a South Korean team handball player and Olympic champion. She competed at the 1992 Summer Olympics in Barcelona, and won the gold medal with the Korean national team.
