= Tommy Suoraniemi =

Swedish handball player (born 1969)

Personal information
- Full name: Tommy Roger Suoraniemi
- Born: 28 February 1969 (age 57) Tensta, Sweden
- Height: 164 cm (65 in)

Sport
- Sport: Handball
- Position: Right wing

Youth career
- Years: Team
- –: Tyresö HF

Senior clubs
- Years: Team
- –1990: Tyresö HF
- 1990–1998: HK Drott
National team
| Years | Team | Apps | (Gls) |
| 1988–1995 | Sweden | 60 | (87) |

Teams managed
- 2011–2014: HK Drott (assistant)
- 2014–2015: HK Drott
- 2016–2019: Finnish women
Medal record
Men's Handball
| Silver medal – second place | 1992 Barcelona | Team |

Tommy Roger Suoraniemi (born 28 February 1969 in Tensta) is a Swedish handball player who competed in the 1992 Summer Olympics.

He made his debut for the Swedish national team in 1988 at the age of 19. In 1992 he was a member of the Swedish handball team which won the silver medal. He played one match and scored four goals.

At club level Suoraniemi played for Tyresö HF and HK Drott. With HK Drott he won two national championships, in 1991 and 1994.

== Coaching career ==
From 2011 he was the assistant coach at HK Drott under Ulf Sivertsson. In 2013 Drott won the Swedish championship. On 28 February 2014 he became the head coach, after Ulf Sivertsson was fired.

In November 2015 he was fired after a bad start to the new season.

In September 2016 he became the head coach of the Finnish women's national team. He stopped in this position in 2019.
