= Anders Bäckegren =

Swedish handball player (born 1968)

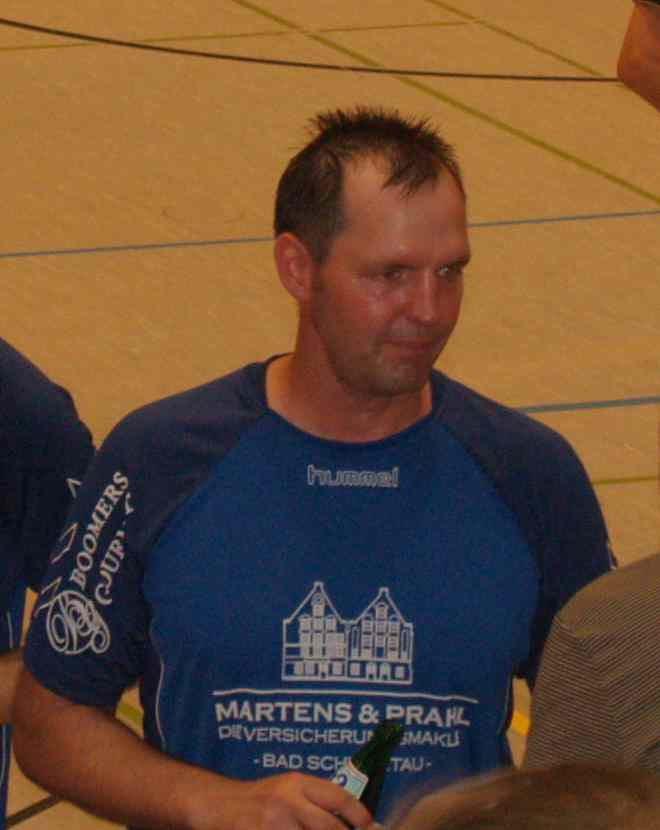

Personal information
- Full name: Per Anders Bäckegren
- Born: 25 July 1968 (age 58) Gothenburg, Sweden
- Height: 192 cm (76 in)

Sport
- Sport: Handball
- Position: Left Back

Youth career
- Years: Team
- –1987: BK Heid

Senior clubs
- Years: Team
- 1987–1989: BK Heid
- 1989–1996: Redbergslids IK
- 1996–2001: VfL Bad Schwartau
National team
Years	Team	Apps	(Gls)
1990–1996	Sweden	57	(92)
Medal record
Men's Handball
Silver medal – second place	1992 Barcelona	Team

Per Anders Bäckegren (born 25 July 1968) is a Swedish handball player who competed in the 1992 Summer Olympics. He was a member of the Swedish handball team which won the silver medal. In 1992, he played two matches and scored one goal.
