= Hege Frøseth =

Norwegian handball player (born 1969)

Personal information
- Nationality: Norwegian
- Born: Hege Kirsti Frøseth; 20 December 1969 (age 56) Trondheim, Norway

Sport
- Sport: Handball
- Position: Goalkeeper

Senior clubs
- Years: Team
- –: Byåsen HE
National team
Years	Team	Apps	(Gls)
1989-1993	Norway	82	(0)
Medal record
Representing Norway
Women's handball
Olympic Games
Silver medal – second place	1992 Barcelona	Team competition
World Championship
Bronze medal – third place	1993 Norway

Hege Kirsti Frøseth (born 20 December 1969) is a Norwegian retired team handball goalkeeper. She received a silver medal at the 1992 Summer Olympics in Barcelona with the Norwegian national team. She also played for the club Byåsen IL. She also won a bronze medal with the Norwegian team at the 1993 World Women's Handball Championship.

Frøseth is married to former footballer Stig Inge Bjørnebye, with whom she has three children. Her father-in-law was ski jumper Jo Inge Bjørnebye.
