= Min Hye-sook =

South Korean handball player (born 1970)

Medal record

Representing South Korea

Women's handball

Olympic Games
Gold medal – first place	1992 Barcelona	Team

Min Hye-Sook (born March 15, 1970) is a South Korean team handball player and Olympic champion. She competed at the 1992 Summer Olympics in Barcelona, where she received a gold medal with the Korean national team.
