= Henriette Henriksen =

Norwegian handball player (born 1970)

Personal information
- Full name: Henriette Henriksen-Løge
- Born: 12 June 1970 (age 56) Stavanger, Norway

Sport
- Sport: Handball

Senior clubs
- Years: Team
- –: IL Vestar
National team
Years	Team	Apps	(Gls)
1989-1997	Norway	38	(26)
Medal record
Representing Norway
Women's handball
Olympic Games
Silver medal – second place	1992 Barcelona	Team Competition

Henriette Henriksen-Løge (born 12 June 1970) is a Norwegian team handball player and coach, and a Olympic medalist. She received silver medals at the 1992 Summer Olympics in Barcelona with the Norwegian national team. Henriksen played 38 games for the national team during her career.

== Personal life ==
Henriksen was born in Stavanger on 12 June 1970.
