= Magnus Cato =

Swedish handball player (born 1967)

Personal information
- Full name: Jan Magnus Cato
- Nationality: Swedish
- Born: 30 June 1967 (age 59) Gothenburg, Sweden

Sport
- Sport: Handball
- Position: Left wing

Senior clubs
- Years: Team
- –: Redbergslids IK
National team
Years	Team	Apps	(Gls)
1988-1993	Sweden	78	(93)
Medal record
Men's Handball
Silver medal – second place	1992 Barcelona	Team

Jan Magnus Cato (born 30 June 1967) is a Swedish handball player who competed in the 1992 Summer Olympics. He played as a left wing.

He debuted for the Swedish national team in 1988. At the 1990 World Men's Handball Championship he won gold medals with the Swedish team. In 1992 he was a member of the Swedish handball team which won the silver medal. He played six matches and scored six goal. He played 78 matches for the Swedish national team, scoring 93 goals.

At club level he played for Redbergslids IK, where he won the Swedish Championship in 1989 and 1993. He retired in 1993 aged only 25.

After his playing career he has worked as an engineer.
