= Park Kap-sook =

South Korean handball player (born 1970)

Medal record

Representing South Korea

Women's handball

Olympic Games
Gold medal – first place	1992 Barcelona	Team

Park Kap-Sook (Korean: 박갑숙; born November 25, 1970), also spelled as Park Gap-suk, is a South Korean team handball player and Olympic champion. She participated at the 1992 Summer Olympics in Barcelona, where she received a gold medal with the South Korean team.
