= Elina Guseva =

Azerbaijani handball player

Medal record

Summer Olympics

Representing the Soviet Union
Bronze medal – third place	1988 Seoul	Team

Representing the Unified Team
Bronze medal – third place	1992 Barcelona	Team

World Championship

Representing the Soviet Union
Gold medal – first place	1986 Netherlands	Team

Elina Aleksandrovna Guseva (Azerbaijani: Elina Quseva, Russian: Элина Александровна Гусева, born 20 January 1964 in Ashgabat) is an Azerbaijani and later Russian former handball player who competed for the Soviet Union in the 1988 Summer Olympics and for the Unified Team in the 1992 Summer Olympics.

In 1988 she won the bronze medal with the Soviet team. She played one match and scored one goal.

Four years later she was a member of the Unified Team which won the bronze medal. She played all five matches and scored 14 goals.
