= Tetyana Horb =

Ukrainian handball player

Olympic medal record

Women's Handball

Representing the Soviet Union
Bronze medal – third place	1988 Seoul	Team

Representing the Unified Team
Bronze medal – third place	1992 Barcelona	Team

World Championship

Representing Soviet Union
Gold medal – first place	1982 Hungary	Team
Gold medal – first place	1986 Netherlands	Team
Gold medal – first place	1990 South Korea	Team

Tetyana Horb (Ukrainian: Тетяна Горб, born 18 November 1965 in Cherkasy) is a Ukrainian former handball player who competed for the Soviet Union in the 1988 Summer Olympics and for the Unified Team in the 1992 Summer Olympics. She played for Spartak Kiev.

In 1988 she won the bronze medal with the Soviet team. She played in all five matches and scored ten goals.

Four years later she was a member of the Unified Team which won the bronze medal. She played in all five matches and scored 14 goals.
