= Jang Ri-ra =

South Korean handball player (born 1969)

Medal record

Women's handball

Representing South Korea

Olympic Games
Gold medal – first place	1992 Barcelona	Team

Asian Games
Gold medal – first place	1990 Beyjing	

Jang Ri-Ra (born May 4, 1969) is a South Korean team handball player and Olympic champion. She participated at the 1992 Summer Olympics in Barcelona, where she received a gold medal with the Korean national team.

She also won a gold medal with Korea at the 1990 Asian Games.
