= Andrei Kovalenko (water polo) =

Water polo player

Andriy Kovalenko
Personal information
- Born: 6 November 1970 (age 55) Kiev, Ukrainian SSR, Soviet Union
Medal record
Men's water polo
Representing the Unified Team
Olympic Games
Bronze medal – third place	1992 Barcelona	Team
Representing Soviet Union
European Championship
Bronze medal – third place	1991 Athens	Team

Andrei Kovalenko (Андрій Коваленко; born 6 November 1970 in Kiev) is an Australian water polo player and former coach of the UWA Torpedoes Men's Water Polo team and the u18 and u16 UWA City Beach Bears.

He competed for Australia at the 2000 Sydney Olympic Games, as well as for CIS at Barcelona 1992, which he won a bronze medal and Ukraine at the 1996 Summer Olympics. In 2007, he helped Australia attain a bronze medal in the FINA Water Polo World League.

== See also ==
- List of Olympic medalists in water polo (men)
