= Svetlana Bogdanova (handballer) =

Russian former handball player (born 1964)

Personal information
- Full name: Svetlana Vladimirovna Bogdanova
- Nationality: Russian
- Born: 12 July 1964 Sverdlovsk, Soviet Union

Sport
- Sport: Handball
- Position: Goalkeeper

Senior clubs
- Years: Team
- 1996–1999: Milar L'Eliana
- 1999–2003: Ferrobus Mislata
- 2003–2006: SD Itxako
National team
- Years: Team
- –: Soviet Union
- 1992: Unified Team
- –: Russia
Medal record
Representing the Soviet Union
World Championship
Gold medal – first place	1990 South Korea	Team
Representing the Unified Team
Olympic Games
Bronze medal – third place	1992 Barcelona	Team
Representing Russia
World Championship
Gold medal – first place	2001 Italy	Team

Svetlana Vladimirovna Bogdanova (Russian: Светлана Владимировна Богданова, born July 12, 1964) is a Russian former handball player who competed for the Unified Team in the 1992 Summer Olympics.

In 1992 she won the bronze medal with the Unified Team. She played all five matches as goalkeeper.
