= Philippe Médard =

French handball player (1959-2017)

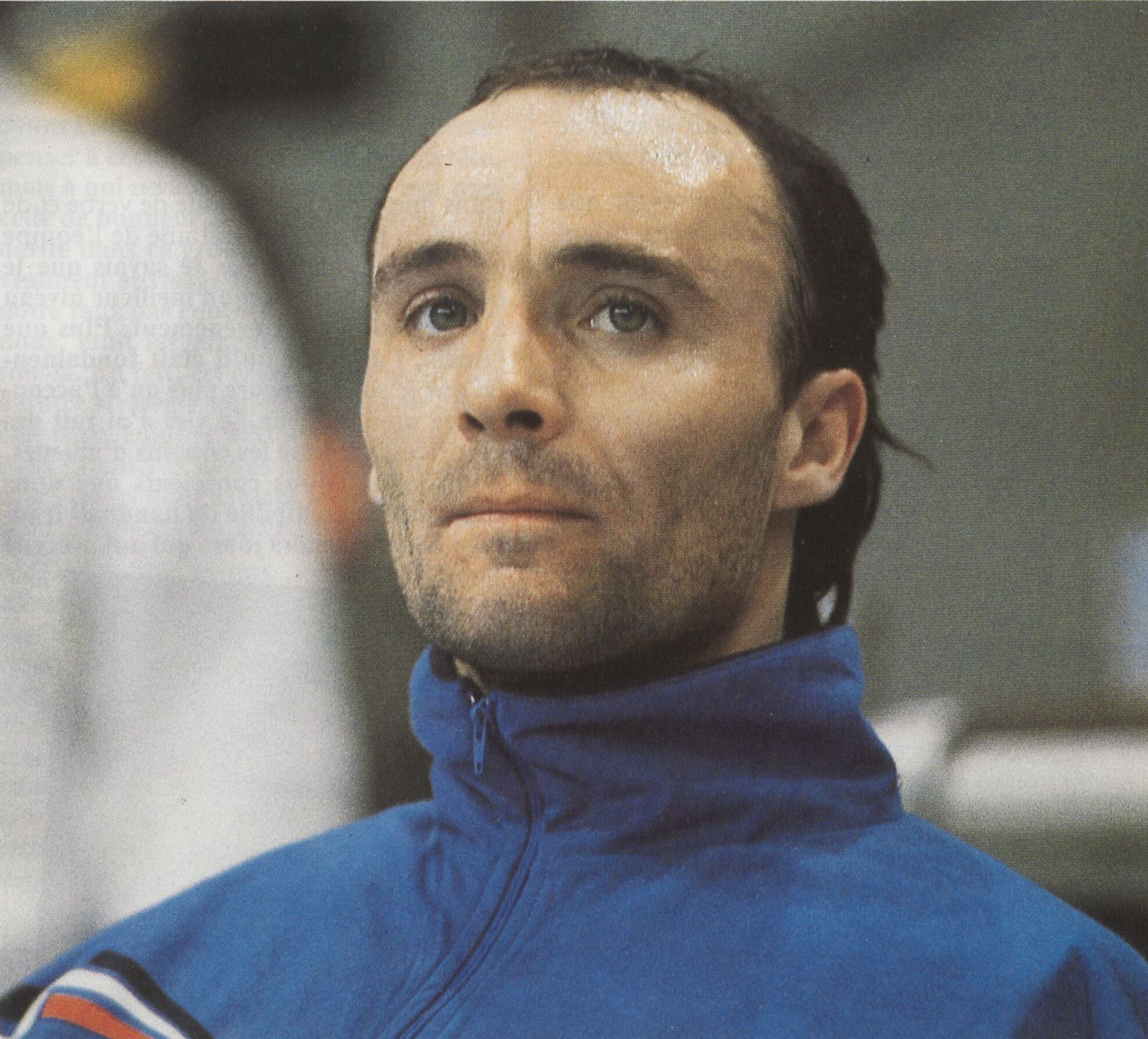
- Philippe Médard in 1989

Personal information
- Full name: Philippe Jean Charles Médard
- Nationality: French
- Born: 10 June 1959 Meslay-du-Maine, France
- Died: September 30, 2017 (aged 58)
- Height: 1.85 m (6 ft 1 in)

Sport
- Sport: Handball
- Position: Goalkeeper

Youth career
- Years: Team
- –: Bois-Colombes Sport

Senior clubs
- Years: Team
- 1978–1979: AC Boulogne-Billancourt
- 1979–1980: Stella Sports Saint-Maur
- 1980–1981: Thonon AC
- 1981–1987: USM Gagny
- 1987–1989: Montpellier Paillade SC
- 1989–1992: USAM Nîmes Gard
- 1992–1993: Massy 91
- 1993–1995: AC Boulogne-Billancourt
National team
Years	Team	Apps	(Gls)
1979–1992	France	188	(0)
Medal record
Men's Handball
Bronze medal – third place	1992 Barcelona	Team

Philippe Médard (10 June 1959 – 30 September 2017) was a French handball player who competed in the 1992 Summer Olympics. He was born in Meslay-du-Maine. In 1992 he was a member of the French handball team which won the bronze medal. He played five matches and scored two goals.

He played in France national handball team 188 times.
