= Tetiana Ustiuzhanina =

Ukrainian rower

Medal record

Women's rowing

Olympic Games

Representing Unified Team
Bronze medal – third place	1992 Barcelona	Quadruple sculls

World Rowing Championships

Representing Soviet Union
Silver medal – second place	1990 Tasmania	W2x
Silver medal – second place	1991 Vienna	W4x

Representing Ukraine
Silver medal – second place	1999 St. Catharines	Quadruple sculls
Bronze medal – third place	1994 Indianapolis	W4x

Tetiana Illivna Ustiuzhanina (Ukrainian: Тетяна Устюжаніна, Tatjana Ustiujanina, born 6 May 1965 in Mariupol) is a Ukrainian competitive rower. She competed for the Unified Team at the 1992 Summer Olympics, winning a bronze medal as a member of the women's quadruple sculls team. Ustiuzhanina also competed for Ukraine at the 1996 Summer Olympics and the 2000 Summer Olympics.

== See also ==
- Unified Team at the 1992 Summer Olympics § Rowing
- Ukraine at the 1996 Summer Olympics § Rowing
- Ukraine at the 2000 Summer Olympics § Rowing
