= Philippe Debureau =

French handball player (born 1960)

Olympic medal record

Men's Handball
Bronze medal – third place	1992 Barcelona	Team

Philippe Debureau (born 25 April 1960) is a French handball player who competed in the 1992 Summer Olympics.

He was born in Hinges.

In 1992 he was a member of the French handball team which won the bronze medal. He played five matches and scored seven goals.
