= Park Jeong-lim =

South Korean handball player (born 1970)

Medal record

Representing South Korea

Women's handball

Olympic Games
Gold medal – first place	1992 Barcelona	Team
Silver medal – second place	1996 Atlanta	Team

World Championship
Gold medal – first place	1995 Austria/Hungary	

Asian Games
Gold medal – first place	1990 Beyjing	

Park Jeong-Lim (Korean: 박정림; born September 25, 1970), also spelled as Park Jeong-Rim, is a South Korean team handball player, Olympic champion and World champion.

She won the gold medal with the South Korean team at the 1992 Summer Olympics in Barcelona. She received a silver medal at the 1996 Summer Olympics in Atlanta.

In 1995 she was part of the South Korea team that won the 1995 World Championship.

She also won a gold medal with Korea at the 1990 Asian Games.

She played for the club 'Dongsung Pharmaceutical' until her retirement in 1997.
