= Aleksandr Kolotov =

Russian water polo player

Personal information
- Born: 4 March 1964 (age 62)
Medal record
Men's Water polo
Olympic Games
Representing the Soviet Union
Bronze medal – third place	1988 Seoul	Team competition
Representing the Unified Team
Bronze medal – third place	1992 Barcelona	Team competition

Aleksandr Kolotov (born 4 March 1964) is a Russian former water polo player who competed in the 1988 Summer Olympics and in the 1992 Summer Olympics.

== See also ==
- List of Olympic medalists in water polo (men)
