= Nataliya Yakovleva (swimmer) =

Russian swimmer

Personal information
- Born: 27 December 1971 (age 54) Penza, Soviet Union

Sport
- Sport: Swimming

Nataliya Yuryevna Yakovleva (Russian: Наталья Юрьевна Яковлева; born 27 December 1971) is a Russian swimmer. She competed at the 1992 Summer Olympics in the 100 m and 200 m butterfly events, but did not reach the finals. Between 1988 and 1993 she won six national titles in butterfly disciplines.

She graduated from the Penza State Pedagogical University in 1992, and between 1994 and 1998 worked in Brazil as a swimming coach.
