= Galina Borzenkova =

Russian handball player

Olympic medal record

Women's Handball
Bronze medal – third place	1992 Barcelona	Team

Galina Borzenkova (Russian: Галина Борзенкова; born February 2, 1964) is a Russian former handball player who competed for the Unified Team in the 1992 Summer Olympics.

In 1992 she won the bronze medal with the Unified Team. She played all five matches and scored five goals.

At club level she played for HC Kuban Krasnodar, where she won the 1987 and 1988 EHF Cup Winners' Cup and the 1989 and 1992 Soviet Championship. Later she played for the Yugoslavian team Bolago Voždovac.
