= Galina Onopriyenko =

Russian handball player (born 1963)

Olympic medal record

Women's Handball
Bronze medal – third place	1992 Barcelona	Team

Galina Viktorovna Onopriyenko (Russian: Галина Викторовна Оноприенко; born February 2, 1963) is a Russian handball player who competed for the Unified Team in the 1992 Summer Olympics.

In 1992 she won the bronze medal with the Unified Team. She played all five matches and scored three goals.
