= Lyudmila Gudz =

Russian handball player (born 1969)

Olympic medal record

Women's Handball
Bronze medal – third place	1992 Barcelona	Team

Lyudmila Gudz (Russian: Людмила Гудзь, born September 10, 1969) is a Russian former handball player who competed for the Unified Team in the 1992 Summer Olympics.

In 1992 she won the bronze medal with the Unified Team, she played all five matches and scored five goals.
