= Aleksandr Ogorodnikov =

Russian water polo player

Personal information
- Born: 8 September 1967 (age 58)

Sport
- Sport: Water polo
Medal record
Representing the Unified Team
Olympic Games
Bronze medal – third place	1992 Barcelona	Team competition
Representing Russia
World Championships
Bronze medal – third place	1994 Rome	Team competition

Aleksandr Ogorodnikov (born 8 September 1967) is a Russian former water polo player who competed in the 1992 Summer Olympics.

== See also ==
- List of Olympic medalists in water polo (men)
- List of World Aquatics Championships medalists in water polo
