= Larisa Kiselyova =

Russian handball player

Olympic medal record

Women's Handball
Bronze medal – third place	1992 Barcelona	Team

Larisa Yevgenyevna Kiselyova (Russian: Лариса Евгеньевна Киселёва, formerly Ferzalieva; born November 3, 1970, in Rostov-on-Don) is a Russian handball player who competed for the Unified Team in the 1992 Summer Olympics.

In 1992 she won the bronze medal with the Unified Team. She played four matches and scored three goals.
