= Irina Gerlits =

Kazakhstani basketball player

Medal record

Women's basketball

Olympic Games

Representing the Soviet Union
Bronze medal – third place	1988 Seoul	Team competition

Representing the Unified Team
Gold medal – first place	1992 Barcelona	Team competition

Irina Gerlits (born 29 April 1966) is a Kazakhstani former basketball player who competed in the 1988 Summer Olympics and in the 1992 Summer Olympics. She was born in Krasnokutsk, Pavlodar Oblast, Kazakh SSR and played for Universitet Alma-Ata, CD CREF Madrid and CD Universidad de Oviedo in Spain, and BC Bordeaux and BC Reims in France.
