= Andrey Belofastov =

Russian water polo player

Personal information
- Born: 2 October 1969 (age 56) Kyiv, Ukrainian SSR, Soviet Union
Medal record
Men's water polo
Representing Soviet Union
| Bronze medal – third place | 1991 Athens | Team competition |
Representing the Unified Team
Olympic Games
| Bronze medal – third place | 1992 Barcelona | Team competition |

Andrey Belofastov (born 2 October 1969 in Kyiv, Ukraine) is a Russian former water polo player who competed in the 1992 Summer Olympics.

== See also ==
- List of Olympic medalists in water polo (men)
