= Yelena Shubina =

Russian swimmer

Olympic medal record

Women's Swimming

Representing the Unified Team
Bronze medal – third place	1992 Barcelona	4x100 m medley relay

Yelena Shubina (born 28 September 1974) is a Russian former swimmer who competed in the 1992 Summer Olympics.
