= Svetlana Pryakhina =

Russian handball player

Personal information
- Full name: Svetlana Anatolyevna Pryakhina
- Nationality: Russian
- Born: 29 July 1970 (age 56) Volgograd, Soviet Union
- Height: 1.68 m (5 ft 6 in)

Sport
- Sport: Handball
- Position: Left wing

Senior clubs
- Years: Team
- –: HC Kuban Krasnodar
National team
- Years: Team
- –: Soviet Union
- –: Unified Team
- –: Russia
Medal record
Olympic Games
Bronze medal – third place	1992 Barcelona	Team
World Championship
Gold medal – first place	1990 South Korea	Team

Svetlana Anatolyevna Pryakhina (Russian: Светлана Анатольевна Пряхина, born July 29, 1970, in Volgograd, Soviet Union) is a Russian handball player who won the 1990 World Women's Handball Championship. She also competed for the Unified Team in the 1992 Summer Olympics.

In 1992 she won the bronze medal with the Unified Team. She played all five matches and scored six goals.

She played her club handball at HC Kuban Krasnodar, where she won the 1987 and 1998 EHF Cup Winners' Cup, and the 1989 and 1992 Soviet Championship.
