= Vladimir Karabutov =

Russian water polo player

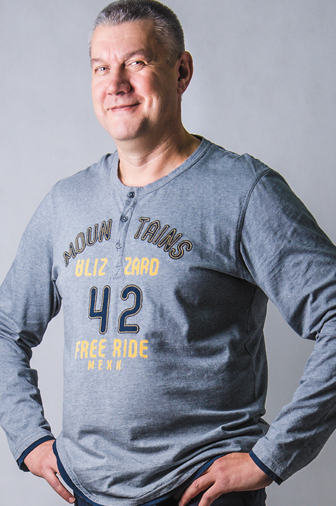
- Karabutov in 2013

Personal information
- Born: 22 April 1967 (age 59) Volgograd, Soviet Union
- Height: 195 cm (6 ft 5 in)
- Weight: 93 kg (205 lb)

Sport
- Sport: Athletics
- Club: Lukoil-Spartak, Volgograd
Medal record
Representing the Unified Team
Olympic Games
Bronze medal – third place	1992 Barcelona	Team competition
Representing the Soviet Union
European Championships
Bronze medal – third place	1991 Athens	Team

Vladimir Karabutov (born 22 April 1967) is a Russian former water polo player. He competed at the 1992 and 1996 Summer Olympics and finished in third and fifth place, respectively. He won another bronze medal at the 1991 European Championships.

== See also ==
- List of Olympic medalists in water polo (men)
