= Andrey Barbashinsky =

Belarusian handball player

Andrey Stanislavovich Barbashinsky
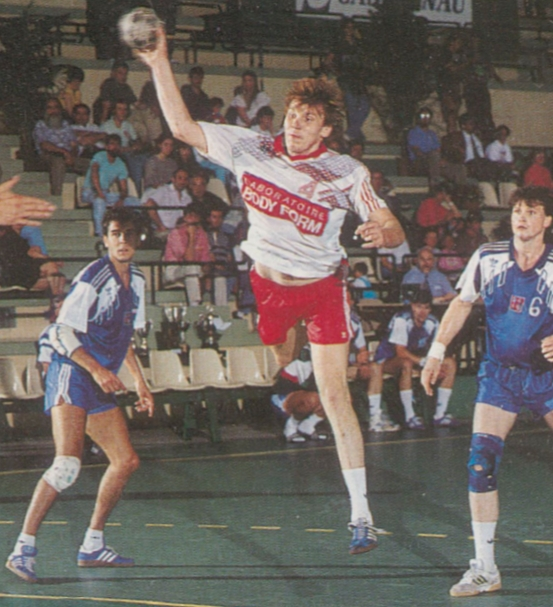
- Barbashinsky in 1992

Personal information
- Born: 4 May 1970 (age 56) Ashmyany, Belarus
- Height: 206 cm (81 in)
- Weight: 110 kg (243 lb)

Sport
- Sport: Handball
- Position: pivot

Youth career
- Years: Team
- –: Ashmyany

Senior clubs
- Years: Team
- 1986–1993: SKA Minsk
- 1993–1994: Club Juventud Alcalá
- 1994–1995: SKA Minsk
- 1995–1996: Veszprém KC
- 1996–1997: VfL Hameln
- 1997–2001: TV Emsdetten
National team
Years	Team	Apps	(Gls)
1992	Unified team	7	(19)
1992–?	Belarus	49	(134)
Medal record
Men's Handball
Gold medal – first place	1992 Barcelona	Team

Andrey Stanislavovich Barbashinsky (Belarusian: Андрэй Станіслававіч Барбашынскі; Russian: Андрей Станиславович Барбашинский, born May 4, 1970, in Ashmyany, Hrodna Voblast) is a Belarusian former handball player who competed for the Unified Team in the 1992 Summer Olympics.

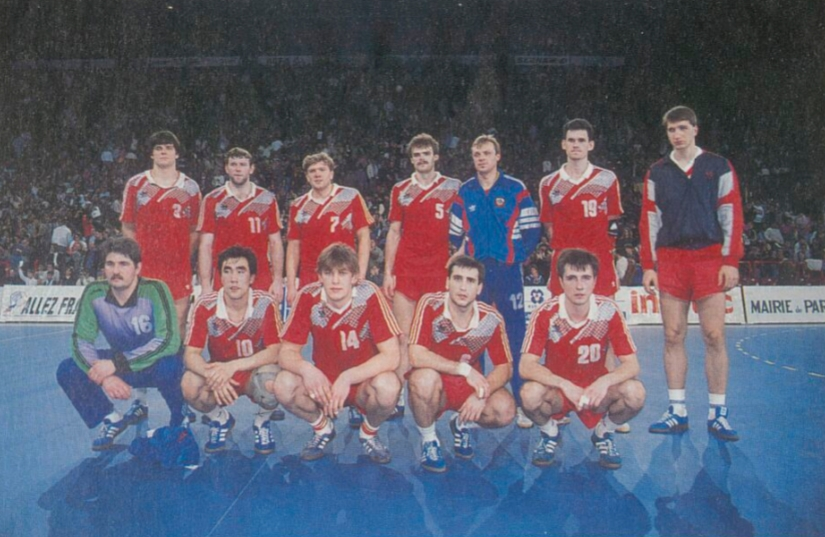
The CIS team in 1992

In 1992 he won the gold medal with the Unified Team. He played all seven matches and scored 19 goals.
