= Natalya Deryugina =

Russian handball player

Personal information
- Full name: Natalya Borissovna Deryugina
- Born: 23 April 1971 (age 55) Moscow, Soviet Union
- Height: 180 cm (71 in)

Sport
- Sport: Handball
- Position: Line player

Senior clubs
- Years: Team
- –1994: Luch Moscow
- 1994–2003: Viborg HK
- 2003–2008: Aalborg DH
National team
Years	Team	Apps	(Gls)
1992	Unified Team	5	(14)
1992–2005	Russia	139	(544)
Medal record
Women's handball
Bronze medal – third place	1992 Barcelona	Team

Natalya Borissovna Deryugina (Russian: Наталья Дерюгина, born April 23, 1971) is a former Russian handball player on the Unified Team at the 1992 Summer Olympics which won the bronze medals. She played every match and scored 14 goals.
