= Olga Kirichenko =

Ukrainian swimmer

Olympic medal record

Women's Swimming

Representing the Unified Team
Bronze medal – third place	1992 Barcelona	4x100 m medley relay

Olga Kirichenko (born 27 January 1976) is a Ukrainian former swimmer who competed in the 1992 Summer Olympics.
