= Sergey Kostarev =

Soviet fencer (born 1966)

Personal information
- Born: 25 March 1966 (age 60)

Sport
- Sport: Fencing
Medal record
Men's fencing
Representing Unified Team
Olympic Games
Bronze medal – third place	1992 Barcelona	Épée, team

Sergey Kostarev (born 25 March 1966) is a Soviet fencer. He won a bronze medal in the team épée event at the 1992 Summer Olympics.
