= Aleksey Vdovin =

Russian water polo player (1963–2022)

Personal information
- Born: 17 June 1963 Penza, Russian SFSR, USSR
- Died: 22 July 2022 (aged 59)

Sport
- Sport: Water polo
Medal record
Representing the Soviet Union
World Championships
Gold medal – first place	1982 Guayaquil	Team competition
European Championships
Bronze medal – third place	1991 Athens	Team competition
Representing the Unified Team
Olympic Games
Bronze medal – third place	1992 Barcelona	Team competition

Aleksey Vdovin (17 June 1963 – 22 July 2022) was a Russian water polo player who competed in the 1992 Summer Olympics.

== See also ==
- List of Olympic medalists in water polo (men)
- List of world champions in men's water polo
- List of World Aquatics Championships medalists in water polo
