= Igor Vasilyev (handballer) =

Russian handball player (1966–2023)

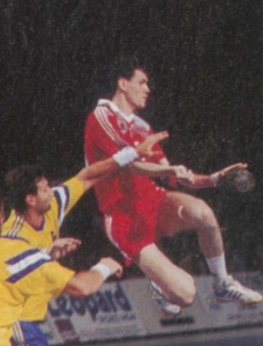
- Igor Vasilyev for the Unified team - 1992

Personal information
- Full name: Igor Vladimirovich Vasilyev
- Born: 24 January 1966 Volgograd, Soviet Union
- Died: May 26, 2023 (aged 57) Volgograd, Soviet Union
- Height: 197 cm (78 in)

Sport
- Sport: Handball
- Position: Right back

Senior clubs
- Years: Team
- -1992: HC Kaustik Volgograd
- 1992-1993: Atletico Madrid
- 1993-1994: TSG Altenhagen-Heepen
- 1994-1995: HSC Suhr Aarau
- 1996: HC Kaustik Volgograd
- 1996-2000: HSG Dornheim/Groß-Gerau
National team
- Years: Team
- –1992: Soviet Union
- 1992: Unified Team
- 1992–1996: Russia

Teams managed
- 2005-2006: TV Nieder-Olm
- –: SG Wehrheim/Obernhain
Medal record
Men's handball
Representing the Unified Team
Olympic Games
Gold medal – first place	1992 Barcelona	Team
Representing Russia
World Championships
Gold medal – first place	1993 Sweden	Team
European Championships
Silver medal – second place	1994 Portugal	Team

Igor Vladimirovich Vasilyev (Russian: Игорь Владимирович Васильев; 24 January 1966 – 26 May 2023) was a Russian handball player and coach, who played as a back. He competed for the Unified Team in the 1992 Summer Olympics. He was born in Volgograd. In 1992 he won the gold medal with the Unified Team. He played all seven matches and scored two goals.

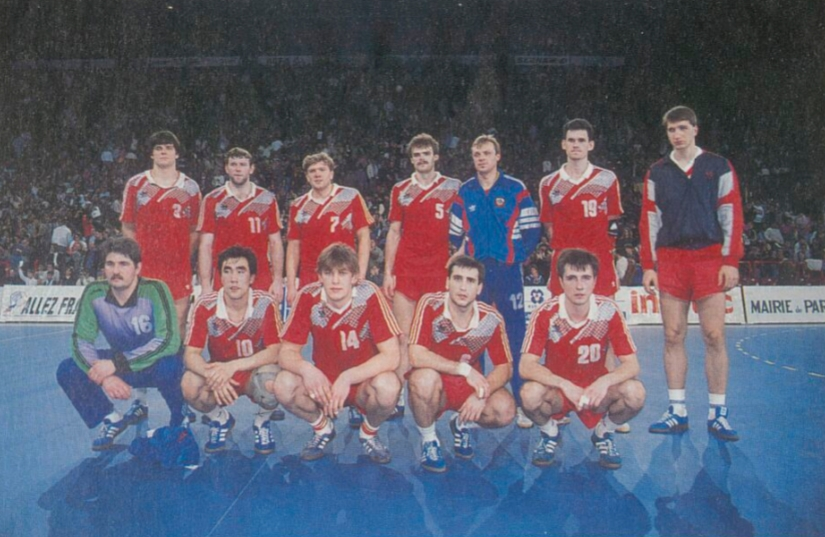
The CIS team in 1992

At the 1993 World Men's Handball Championship he won gold medals with Russia.

Vasilyev died on 26 May 2023, at the age of 57.
