= Fencing at the 1992 Summer Olympics – Men's épée =

Olympic fencing event

Men's épée at the Games of the XXV Olympiad
- Fencing pictogram
- Venue: Palace of Metallurgy
- Dates: 1 August 1992
- Competitors: 70 from 30 nations

Medalists
1st place, gold medalist(s)		Éric Srecki; France
2nd place, silver medalist(s)		Pavel Kolobkov; Unified Team
3rd place, bronze medalist(s)		Jean-Michel Henry; France

The men's épée was one of eight fencing events on the fencing at the 1992 Summer Olympics programme. It was the twenty-first appearance of the event. The competition was held on 1 August 1992. 70 fencers from 30 nations competed. Each nation was limited to three fencers. The event was won by Éric Srecki of France, the nation's fifth victory in the event (second-most behind Italy's six). France also took bronze, with Jean-Michel Henry winning the bronze medal match. France's podium streak in the event extended to four Games. Pavel Kolobkov of the Unified Team took silver.

== Background ==
This was the 21st appearance of the event, which was not held at the first Games in 1896 (with only foil and sabre events held) but has been held at every Summer Olympics since 1900.

Three of the eight quarterfinalists from 1988 returned: gold medalist Arnd Schmitt of West Germany (now competing for united Germany), bronze medalist Andrey Shuvalov of the Soviet Union (now competing for the Unified Team), and fourth-place finisher Sandro Cuomo of Italy. Shuvalov was the reigning (1991) World Champion. Manuel Pereira of Spain was another World Champion (1989) competing in Barcelona.

Estonia and Singapore each made their debut in the event. Some former Soviet republics competed as the Unified Team. France, Great Britain, Sweden, and the United States each appeared for the 19th time, tied for most among nations.

== Competition format ==
The 1992 tournament used a three-phase format roughly similar to prior years in consisting of a group phase, a double-elimination phase, and a single-elimination phase, but each phase was very different from previous formats.

The first phase was a single round (vs. 3 rounds in 1988) round-robin pool play format; each fencer in a pool faced each other fencer in that pool once. There were 10 pools with 7 fencers each. The fencers' ranks within the pool were ignored; the overall winning percentage (with touch differential and then touches against used as tie-breakers) were used to rank the fencers. The top 52 advanced to the second phase, while the other fencers were eliminated.

The second phase was a modified, truncated double-elimination tournament. 12 fencers received a bye to the second round (round of 32), while the 40 fencers ranked 13–52 played in the round of 64. Fencers losing in the round of 64 were eliminated, while the remaining rounds were double elimination via repechages. The repechages (but not the main brackets) used a complicated reseeding mechanism. Ultimately, the 4 fencers remaining undefeated after the round of 8 advanced to the quarterfinals along with 4 fencers who advanced through the repechages after one loss.

The final phase was a single elimination tournament with quarterfinals, semifinals, and a final and bronze medal match.

All bouts were to 5 touches. In the second and third phases, matches were best-of-three bouts.

== Schedule ==
All times are Central European Summer Time (UTC+2)

Date	Time	Round
Saturday, 1 August 1992		Group round Elimination round Final round

== Results ==
=== Group round ===
Fencers were ranked by win percent, then touch differential, then touches against. This ranking, with adjustments to ensure that no two fencers of the same nation were in the same bracket (noted in parentheses), was used to seed the elimination round brackets.

Rank	Fencer	Nation	Pool	Rank	Wins	Losses	Win %	TF	TA	TF - TA	Notes
1	Elmar Borrmann	Germany	6	1	6	0	1.000	30	14	16	Q
2	Angelo Mazzoni	Italy	1	1	6	0	1.000	30	15	15	Q
3	Mauricio Rivas	Colombia	5	1	6	0	1.000	30	18	12	Q
4	Krisztián Kulcsár	Hungary	4	1	6	0	1.000	30	19	11	Q
5	Éric Srecki	France	2	1	5	1	.833	30	13	17	Q
6	Iván Kovács	Hungary	9	1	5	1	.833	28	13	15	Q
7	Jean-Michel Henry	France	8	1	5	1	.833	28	15	13	Q
8	Adrian Pop	Romania	5	2	5	1	.833	29	17	12	Q
9 (10)	Robert Felisiak	Germany	4	2	5	1	.833	29	18	11	Q
10 (9)	Péter Vánky	Sweden	3	1	5	1	.833	29	18	11	Q
11	Sandro Cuomo	Italy	7	1	5	1	.833	30	21	9	Q
12	Laurie Shong	Canada	1	2	4	2	.667	27	15	12	Q
13	Kaido Kaaberma	Estonia	9	2	4	2	.667	25	17	8	Q
14	Olivier Lenglet	France	6	2	4	2	.667	25	17	8	Q
15	Kim Jeong-Gwan	South Korea	8	2	4	2	.667	26	18	8	Q
16	Andrey Shuvalov	Unified Team	3	2	4	2	.667	26	18	8	Q
17	Maurizio Randazzo	Italy	5	3	4	2	.667	26	19	7	Q
18	Pavel Kolobkov	Unified Team	10	1	4	2	.667	27	20	7	Q
19	Michael O'Brien	Ireland	4	3	4	2	.667	28	21	7	Q
20	Lee Sang-Gi	South Korea	6	3	4	2	.667	25	19	6	Q
21	Aleš Depta	Czechoslovakia	1	3	4	2	.667	26	21	5	Q
22	Roman Ječmínek	Czechoslovakia	6	4	4	2	.667	28	23	5	Q
23	Danek Nowosielski	Canada	7	2	4	2	.667	24	20	4	Q
24 (26)	Thomas Lundblad	Sweden	10	2	4	2	.667	25	21	4	Q
25 (27)	Serhiy Kravchuk	Unified Team	2	2	4	2	.667	27	23	4	Q
26 (24)	Robert Davidson	Australia	9	3	4	2	.667	25	23	2	Q
27 (25)	Roberto Lazzarini	Brazil	2	3	4	2	.667	21	23	-2	Q
28 (31)	Jiří Douba	Czechoslovakia	2	4	3	3	.500	26	20	6	Q
29 (30)	Jean-Marc Chouinard	Canada	8	3	3	3	.500	26	20	6	Q
30 (28)	Arnd Schmitt	Germany	10	3	3	3	.500	25	20	5	Q
31 (29)	Fernando de la Peña	Spain	7	3	3	3	.500	26	21	5	Q
32	Jang Tae-Seok	South Korea	9	4	3	3	.500	24	21	3	Q
33 (34)	Gabriel Pantelimon	Romania	7	4	3	3	.500	26	23	3	Q
34 (33)	Maciej Ciszewski	Poland	3	3	3	3	.500	24	22	2	Q
35	Raúl Maroto	Spain	3	4	3	3	.500	23	22	1	Q
36 (38)	Viktor Zuikov	Estonia	10	4	3	3	.500	24	23	1	Q
37 (36)	André Kuhn	Switzerland	8	4	3	3	.500	26	25	1	Q
38 (37)	Rafael di Tella	Argentina	10	5	3	3	.500	22	22	0	Q
39	Ferenc Hegedűs	Hungary	7	5	3	3	.500	22	22	0	Q
40	Jon Normile	United States	9	5	3	3	.500	20	22	-2	Q
41	Juan Miguel Paz	Colombia	1	4	3	3	.500	21	23	-2	Q
42	Gavin McLean	New Zealand	5	4	3	3	.500	21	23	-2	Q
43	Robert Marx	United States	4	4	3	3	.500	19	23	-4	Q
44	Ulf Sandegren	Sweden	8	5	3	3	.500	21	25	-4	Q
45	Mohamed Al-Hamar	Kuwait	3	5	3	3	.500	17	25	-8	Q
46	Olivier Jacquet	Switzerland	5	5	2	4	.333	25	23	2	Q
47	Manuel Pereira	Spain	4	5	2	4	.333	25	27	-2	Q
48 (51)	Cornel Milan	Romania	3	6	2	4	.333	24	27	-3	Q
49 (50)	Sławomir Nawrocki	Poland	8	6	2	4	.333	21	26	-5	Q
50 (48)	Wong James	Singapore	10	6	2	4	.333	18	25	-7	Q
51 (49)	Norikazu Tanabe	Japan	7	6	2	4	.333	21	28	-7	Q
52	Handry Lenzun	Indonesia	1	5	2	4	.333	17	25	-8	Q
53	Steven Paul	Great Britain	2	5	2	4	.333	18	27	-9	
54	Scott Arnold	Australia	6	5	2	4	.333	15	26	-11	
55	Chris O'Loughlin	United States	2	6	1	5	.167	19	26	-7	
56	Witold Gadomski	Poland	9	6	1	5	.167	18	26	-8	
57	Daniel Lang	Switzerland	1	6	1	5	.167	19	27	-8	
58	Zahi El-Khoury	Lebanon	6	6	1	5	.167	20	28	-8	
59	Lucas Zakaria	Indonesia	2	7	1	5	.167	18	27	-9	
60	Rui Frazão	Portugal	10	7	1	5	.167	16	26	-10	
61	Luciano Finardi	Brazil	3	7	1	5	.167	17	28	-11	
61	José Bandeira	Portugal	4	6	1	5	.167	17	28	-11	
63	Francisco Papaiano	Brazil	1	7	1	5	.167	13	27	-14	
64	Michel Youssef	Lebanon	5	6	1	5	.167	11	26	-15	
65	Tan Ronald	Singapore	9	7	1	5	.167	11	29	-18	
66	José Marcelo Álvarez	Paraguay	4	7	0	6	.000	18	30	-12	
67	Dario Torrente	South Africa	7	7	0	6	.000	17	30	-13	
68	Enzo da Ponte	Paraguay	5	7	0	6	.000	14	30	-16	
68	Trevor Strydom	South Africa	6	7	0	6	.000	14	30	-16	
70	Hein van Garderen	South Africa	8	7	0	6	.000	11	30	-19	

=== Elimination rounds ===
==== Main brackets ====
===== Main bracket 1 =====
Ciszewski, Wong, Tanabe, Paz, and Normile were eliminated after the round of 64. The losers in the round of 32 faced off, with Randazzo beating Jang and Davidson beating Pop to advance to the repechage. The losers of the round of 16, Shuvalov and Lazzarini, advanced directly to the first round of the repechage. Vánky, having lost in the round of 8, went to the third round of the repechage. Borrmann won the bracket, advancing to the quarterfinals.

Round of 64
33	Maciej Ciszewski (POL)	4	5
32	Jang Tae-Seok (KOR)	6	6
17	Maurizio Randazzo (ITA)	5	5
48	Wong James (SIN)	2	3
49	Norikazu Tanabe (JPN)	0	4
16	Andrey Shuvalov (EUN)	5	6
41	Juan Miguel Paz (COL)	5	3
24	Robert Davidson (AUS)	6	3
25	Roberto Lazzarini (BRA)	3	5	5
40	Jon Normile (USA)	5	2	2

Round of 32
1	Elmar Borrmann (GER)	5	5
32	Jang Tae-Seok (KOR)	2	3
17	Maurizio Randazzo (ITA)	5	1
16	Andrey Shuvalov (EUN)	6	5
9	Péter Vánky (SWE)	3	5	5
24	Robert Davidson (AUS)	5	2	3
25	Roberto Lazzarini (BRA)	5	5
8	Adrian Pop (ROU)	3	3

Round of 16
1	Elmar Borrmann (GER)	6	6
16	Andrey Shuvalov (EUN)	5	5
9	Péter Vánky (SWE)	3	5	5
25	Roberto Lazzarini (BRA)	5	3	3

Round of 8
1	Elmar Borrmann (GER)	5	4	5
9	Péter Vánky (SWE)	2	6	2

====== Repechage qualifiers 1 ======
Repechage qualifier
32	Jang Tae-Seok (KOR)	5	2	2
17	Maurizio Randazzo (ITA)	3	5	5

Repechage qualifier
24	Robert Davidson (AUS)	5	3	5
8	Adrian Pop (ROU)	1	5	2

===== Main bracket 2 =====
Sandegren, di Tella, Lenzun, Al-Hamar, and Kuhn were eliminated after the round of 64. The losers in the round of 32 faced off, with Depta beating Schmitt and Kulcsár beating Lee to advance to the repechage. The losers of the round of 16, Shong and de la Peña, advanced directly to the first round of the repechage. Srecki, having lost in the round of 8, went to the third round of the repechage. Kaaberma won the bracket, advancing to the quarterfinals.

Round of 64
37	Rafael di Tella (ARG)	2	0
28	Arnd Schmitt (GER)	5	5
21	Aleš Depta (TCH)	6	5
44	Ulf Sandegren (SWE)	4	2
13	Kaido Kaaberma (EST)	5	1	5
52	Handry Lenzun (INA)	1	5	3
45	Mohamed Al-Hamar (KUW)	1	6	5
20	Lee Sang-Gi (KOR)	5	4	6
29	Fernando de la Peña (ESP)	3	6	6
36	André Kuhn (SUI)	5	4	4

Round of 32
5	Éric Srecki (FRA)	6	6
28	Arnd Schmitt (GER)	5	4
21	Aleš Depta (TCH)	4	2
12	Laurie Shong (CAN)	6	5
13	Kaido Kaaberma (EST)	5	5
20	Lee Sang-Gi (KOR)	2	3
29	Fernando de la Peña (ESP)	6	5	6
4	Krisztián Kulcsár (HUN)	5	6	5

Round of 16
5	Éric Srecki (FRA)	5	5
12	Laurie Shong (CAN)	2	0
13	Kaido Kaaberma (EST)	6	6
29	Fernando de la Peña (ESP)	4	5

Round of 8
5	Éric Srecki (FRA)	3	5	5
13	Kaido Kaaberma (EST)	5	3	6

====== Repechage qualifiers 2 ======
Repechage qualifier
28	Arnd Schmitt (GER)	5	4
21	Aleš Depta (TCH)	6	6

Repechage qualifier
20	Lee Sang-Gi (KOR)	4	3
4	Krisztián Kulcsár (HUN)	6	5

===== Main bracket 3 =====
Maroto, O'Brien, Milan, Ječmínek, and Zuikov were eliminated after the round of 64. The losers in the round of 32 faced off, with Chouinard beating Jacquet and Kravchuk beating Cuomo to advance to the repechage. The losers of the round of 16, Lenglet and Marx, advanced directly to the first round of the repechage. Rivas, having lost in the round of 8, went to the third round of the repechage. Kovács won the bracket, advancing to the quarterfinals.

Round of 64
35	Raúl Maroto (ESP)	5	3
30	Jean-Marc Chouinard (CAN)	6	5
19	Michael O'Brien (IRL)	3	2
46	Olivier Jacquet (SUI)	5	5
51	Cornel Milan (ROU)	3	1
14	Olivier Lenglet (FRA)	5	5
43	Robert Marx (USA)	6	5
22	Roman Ječmínek (TCH)	4	2
27	Serhiy Kravchuk (EUN)	6	6
36	Viktor Zuikov (EST)	5	4

Round of 32
3	Mauricio Rivas (COL)	5	6	6
30	Jean-Marc Chouinard (CAN)	6	5	5
46	Olivier Jacquet (SUI)	5	5
14	Olivier Lenglet (FRA)	6	5
11	Sandro Cuomo (ITA)	3	3
43	Robert Marx (USA)	5	5
27	Serhiy Kravchuk (EUN)	0	3
6	Iván Kovács (HUN)	5	5

Round of 16
3	Mauricio Rivas (COL)	5	6	5
14	Olivier Lenglet (FRA)	6	5	2
43	Robert Marx (USA)	3	1
6	Iván Kovács (HUN)	5	5

Round of 8
3	Mauricio Rivas (COL)	3	3
6	Iván Kovács (HUN)	5	5

====== Repechage qualifiers 3 ======
Repechage qualifier
30	Jean-Marc Chouinard (CAN)	6	5
46	Olivier Jacquet (SUI)	4	2

Repechage qualifier
11	Sandro Cuomo (ITA)	2	3
27	Serhiy Kravchuk (EUN)	5	5

===== Main bracket 4 =====
Hegedűs, McLean, Kim, Pereira, and Pantelimon were eliminated after the round of 64. The losers in the round of 32 faced off, with Nowosielski beating Lundblad and Mazzoni beating Nawrocki to advance to the repechage. The losers of the round of 16, Henry and Douba, advanced directly to the first round of the repechage. Felisiak, having lost in the round of 8, went to the third round of the repechage. Kolobkov won the bracket, advancing to the quarterfinals.

Round of 64
39	Ferenc Hegedűs (HUN)	5	3
26	Thomas Lundblad (SWE)	6	5
23	Danek Nowosielski (CAN)	1	5	5
42	Gavin McLean (NZL)	5	3	1
15	Kim Jeong-Gwan (KOR)	1	2
50	Sławomir Nawrocki (POL)	5	5
47	Manuel Pereira (ESP)	1	6	1
18	Pavel Kolobkov (EUN)	5	5	5
31	Jiří Douba (TCH)	1	5	5
34	Gabriel Pantelimon (ROU)	5	2	2

Round of 32
7	Jean-Michel Henry (FRA)	5	5
26	Thomas Lundblad (SWE)	1	1
23	Danek Nowosielski (CAN)	0	4
10	Robert Felisiak (GER)	5	6
50	Sławomir Nawrocki (POL)	6	2	2
18	Pavel Kolobkov (EUN)	4	5	5
31	Jiří Douba (TCH)	5	5
2	Angelo Mazzoni (ITA)	2	2

Round of 16
7	Jean-Michel Henry (FRA)	5	5	3
10	Robert Felisiak (GER)	3	6	5
18	Pavel Kolobkov (EUN)	5	6
31	Jiří Douba (TCH)	2	5

Round of 8
10	Robert Felisiak (GER)	2	3
18	Pavel Kolobkov (EUN)	5	5

====== Repechage qualifiers 4 ======
Repechage qualifier
26	Thomas Lundblad (SWE)	3	6	5
23	Danek Nowosielski (CAN)	5	4	6

Repechage qualifier
50	Sławomir Nawrocki (POL)	2	3
2	Angelo Mazzoni (ITA)	5	5

==== Repechage rounds 1 and 2 ====
The fencers were reseeded: the eight fencers who had lost in the round of 16 were reseeded as 1–8 while the eight fencers who had lost in the round of 32 but won the repechage qualifiers were reseeded as 9–16. Rematches of main bracket matches were avoided. For example, original seed #2 Mazzoni would have been reseeded as #9 because he was the top-seeded fencer who had advanced through the repechage qualifiers. That would have placed original #4 Kulcsár as (new) #10, setting up a rematch against (new) #7 de la Peña; Kulcsár and Mazzoni were swapped to #9 and #10, respectively. Original seeds are shown in parentheses in the brackets.

R1 seed	O seed	Fencer	Nation
From round of 16
1	7	Jean-Michel Henry	France
2	12	Laurie Shong	Canada
3	14	Olivier Lenglet	France
4	16	Andrey Shuvalov	Unified Team
5	25	Roberto Lazzarini	Brazil
6	31	Jiří Douba	Czechoslovakia
7	29	Fernando de la Peña	Spain
8	43	Robert Marx	United States
From round of 32 and qualifiers
9	4	Krisztián Kulcsár	Hungary
10	2	Angelo Mazzoni	Italy
11	17	Maurizio Randazzo	Italy
12	21	Aleš Depta	Czechoslovakia
13	23	Danek Nowosielski	Canada
14	27	Serhiy Kravchuk	Unified Team
15	24	Robert Davidson	Australia
16	30	Jean-Marc Chouinard	Canada

===== Repechage rounds 1 and 2 bracket 1 =====
Repechage round 1					Repechage round 2
1 (7)	Jean-Michel Henry (FRA)	5	5
16 (30)	Jean-Marc Chouinard (CAN)	3	3		1 (7)	Jean-Michel Henry (FRA)	5	2	5
9 (4)	Krisztián Kulcsár (HUN)	5	3	6	9 (4)	Krisztián Kulcsár (HUN)	2	5	2
8 (43)	Robert Marx (USA)	2	5	5

===== Repechage rounds 1 and 2 bracket 2 =====
Repechage round 1				Repechage round 2
5 (25)	Roberto Lazzarini (BRA)	1	2
12 (21)	Aleš Depta (TCH)	5	5	12 (21)	Aleš Depta (TCH)	1	2
13 (23)	Danek Nowosielski (CAN)	1	1	4 (16)	Andrey Shuvalov (EUN)	5	5
4 (16)	Andrey Shuvalov (EUN)	5	5

===== Repechage rounds 1 and 2 bracket 3 =====
Repechage round 1					Repechage round 2
3 (14)	Olivier Lenglet (FRA)	3	6	4
14 (27)	Serhiy Kravchuk (EUN)	5	5	6	14 (27)	Serhiy Kravchuk (EUN)	5	5	5
11 (17)	Maurizio Randazzo (ITA)	6	6		11 (17)	Maurizio Randazzo (ITA)	2	6	1
6 (31)	Jiří Douba (TCH)	5	5

===== Repechage rounds 1 and 2 bracket 4 =====
Repechage round 1					Repechage round 2
7 (29)	Fernando de la Peña (ESP)	5	2	3
10 (2)	Angelo Mazzoni (ITA)	1	5	5	10 (2)	Angelo Mazzoni (ITA)	6	5
15 (24)	Robert Davidson (AUS)	6	5	3	2 (12)	Laurie Shong (CAN)	4	3
2 (12)	Laurie Shong (CAN)	5	6	5

==== Repechage round 3 ====
The fencers were reseeded again. Seeds 1–4 were given to round 8 losers, based on their original seeds (Vánky and Felisiak, who had been swapped to avoid having two German fencers in main bracket 1, were reseeded as if they had not been swapped). Seeds 5–8 were given to the winners of the second round of the repechage, based on their original seeds—except that Henry was moved from #6 to #5 to avoid a rematch with Felisiak.

R3 seed	R1 seed	O seed	Fencer	Nation
From round of 8
1	–	3	Mauricio Rivas	Colombia
2	–	5	Éric Srecki	France
3	–	10	Robert Felisiak	Germany
4	–	9	Péter Vánky	Sweden
From repechage round 2
5	1	7	Jean-Michel Henry	France
6	10	2	Angelo Mazzoni	Italy
7	4	16	Andrey Shuvalov	Unified Team
8	14	27	Serhiy Kravchuk	Unified Team

===== Repechage round 3 bracket 1 =====
Repechage round 3
1 (3)	Mauricio Rivas (COL)	5	6
8 (27)	Serhiy Kravchuk (EUN)	2	4

===== Repechage round 3 bracket 2 =====
Repechage round 3
5 (7)	Jean-Michel Henry (FRA)	5	6
4 (10)	Péter Vánky (SWE)	3	4

===== Repechage round 3 bracket 3 =====
Repechage round 3
3 (10)	Robert Felisiak (GER)	4	3
6 (2)	Angelo Mazzoni (ITA)	6	5

===== Repechage round 3 bracket 4 =====
Repechage round 3
7 (16)	Andrey Shuvalov (EUN)	3	2
2 (5)	Éric Srecki (FRA)	5	5

=== Final rounds ===
The fencers were reseeded a final time. Seeds 1–4 were given to the round of 8 winners, based on their original seeds. Seeds 5–8 were given to the winners of the third round of the repechage, based on their original seeds.

F seed	R3 seed	R1 seed	O seed	Fencer	Nation
From round of 8
1	–	–	1	Elmar Borrmann	Germany
2	–	–	6	Iván Kovács	Hungary
3	–	–	13	Kaido Kaaberma	Estonia
4	–	–	18	Pavel Kolobkov	Unified Team
From repechage round 3
5	6	10	2	Angelo Mazzoni	Italy
6	1	–	3	Mauricio Rivas	Colombia
7	2	–	5	Éric Srecki	France
8	5	1	7	Jean-Michel Henry	France

Quarterfinals
1 (1)	Elmar Borrmann (GER)	5	4	0
8 (7)	Jean-Michel Henry (FRA)	2	6	5
5 (2)	Angelo Mazzoni (ITA)	5	0	2
4 (18)	Pavel Kolobkov (EUN)	0	5	5
3 (13)	Kaido Kaaberma (EST)	5	5
6 (3)	Mauricio Rivas (COL)	3	3
7 (5)	Éric Srecki (FRA)	5	4	5
2 (6)	Iván Kovács (HUN)	3	6	1

Semifinals
8 (7)	Jean-Michel Henry (FRA)	3	5	5
4 (18)	Pavel Kolobkov (EUN)	5	2	6
3 (13)	Kaido Kaaberma (EST)	2	3
7 (5)	Éric Srecki (FRA)	5	5

Final
4 (18)	Pavel Kolobkov (EUN)	5	2
7 (5)	Éric Srecki (FRA)	6	5
Bronze match
8 (7)	Jean-Michel Henry (FRA)	2	5	5
3 (13)	Kaido Kaaberma (EST)	5	2	3

== Final classification ==
Fencer	Nation
Éric Srecki	France
Pavel Kolobkov	Unified Team
Jean-Michel Henry	France
Kaido Kaaberma	Estonia
Elmar Borrmann	Germany
Angelo Mazzoni	Italy
Mauricio Rivas	Colombia
Iván Kovács	Hungary
Robert Felisiak	Germany
Péter Vánky	Sweden
Andrey Shuvalov	Unified Team
Serhiy Kravchuk	Unified Team
Krisztián Kulcsár	Hungary
Laurie Shong	Canada
Maurizio Randazzo	Italy
Aleš Depta	Czechoslovakia
Olivier Lenglet	France
Danek Nowosielski	Canada
Robert Davidson	Australia
Roberto Lazzarini	Brazil
Jiří Douba	Czechoslovakia
Jean-Marc Chouinard	Canada
Fernando de la Peña	Spain
Robert Marx	United States
Adrian Pop	Romania
Sandro Cuomo	Italy
Lee Sang-Gi	South Korea
Thomas Lundblad	Sweden
Arnd Schmitt	Germany
Jang Tae-Seok	South Korea
Olivier Jacquet	Switzerland
Sławomir Nawrocki	Poland
Kim Jeong-Gwan	South Korea
Michael O'Brien	Ireland
Roman Ječmínek	Czechoslovakia
Gabriel Pantelimon	Romania
Maciej Ciszewski	Poland
Raúl Maroto	Spain
Viktor Zuikov	Estonia
André Kuhn	Switzerland
Rafael di Tella	Argentina
Ferenc Hegedűs	Hungary
Jon Normile	United States
Juan Miguel Paz	Colombia
Gavin McLean	New Zealand
Ulf Sandegren	Sweden
Mohamed Al-Hamar	Kuwait
Manuel Pereira	Spain
Cornel Milan	Romania
Wong James	Singapore
Norikazu Tanabe	Japan
Handry Lenzun	Indonesia
Steven Paul	Great Britain
Scott Arnold	Australia
Chris O'Loughlin	United States
Witold Gadomski	Poland
Daniel Lang	Switzerland
Zahi El-Khoury	Lebanon
Lucas Zakaria	Indonesia
Rui Frazão	Portugal
Luciano Finardi	Brazil
José Bandeira	Portugal
Francisco Papaiano	Brazil
Michel Youssef	Lebanon
Tan Ronald	Singapore
José Marcelo Álvarez	Paraguay
Dario Torrente	South Africa
Enzo da Ponte	Paraguay
Trevor Strydom	South Africa
Hein van Garderen	South Africa
