= Fencing at the 1992 Summer Olympics – Men's team épée =

Men's team épée at the Games of the XXV Olympiad
- Venue: Palace of Metallurgy
- Dates: 5 – 6 August 1992
- Competitors: 60 from 12 nations

Medalists
1st place, gold medalist(s)		Elmar Borrmann; Robert Felisiak; Arnd Schmitt; Uwe Proske; Wladimir Resnitschenko	Germany
2nd place, silver medalist(s)		Iván Kovács; Krisztián Kulcsár; Ferenc Hegedűs; Ernő Kolczonay; Gábor Totola	Hungary
3rd place, bronze medalist(s)		Pavel Kolobkov; Andrey Shuvalov; Serhiy Kravchuk; Sergey Kostarev; Valery Zakharevich	Unified Team

The men's team épée was one of eight fencing events on the fencing at the 1992 Summer Olympics programme. It was the nineteenth appearance of the event. The competition was held from 5 to 6 August 1992. 60 fencers from 12 nations competed.

== Results ==
=== Round One ===
==== Pool A ====
Team	Pld	W	L
France	3	2	0
Sweden	3	1	1
South Korea	3	0	2

==== Pool B ====
Team	Pld	W	L
Unified Team	3	2	0
Spain	3	1	1
Czechoslovakia	3	0	2

==== Pool C ====
Team	Pld	W	L
Hungary	3	2	0
Germany	3	1	1
Romania	3	0	2

==== Pool D ====
Team	Pld	W	L
Italy	3	2	0
Canada	3	1	1
Poland	3	0	2

=== Final Round ===
Quarterfinals
France	8
Spain	2
Canada	8
Hungary	8
Italy	2
Germany	8
Sweden	1
Unified Team	9

Semifinals
France	3
Hungary	9
Germany	8
Unified Team	7

Final
Hungary	4
Germany	8
Third place
France	8
Unified Team	8

== Rosters ==
Canada

- Jean-Marc Chouinard
- Alain Côté
- Allan Francis
- Danek Nowosielski
- Laurie Shong

Czechoslovakia

- Aleš Depta
- Jiří Douba
- Roman Ječmínek
- Michal Franc
- Tomáš Kubíček

France

- Éric Srecki
- Jean-Michel Henry
- Olivier Lenglet
- Jean-François Di Martino
- Robert Leroux

Germany

- Elmar Borrmann
- Robert Felisiak
- Arnd Schmitt
- Uwe Proske
- Wladimir Resnitschenko

Hungary

- Iván Kovács
- Krisztián Kulcsár
- Ferenc Hegedűs
- Ernő Kolczonay
- Gábor Totola

Italy

- Sandro Cuomo
- Angelo Mazzoni
- Stefano Pantano
- Maurizio Randazzo
- Sandro Resegotti

Poland

- Sławomir Nawrocki
- Maciej Ciszewski
- Witold Gadomski
- Marek Stępień
- Sławomir Zwierzyński

Romania

- Adrian Pop
- Gabriel Pantelimon
- Cornel Milan
- Gheorghe Epurescu
- Nicolae Mihăilescu

South Korea

- Lee Sang-Gi
- Jang Tae-Seok
- Kim Jeong-Gwan
- Gu Gyo-Dong
- Lee Sang-Yeop

Spain

- Fernando de la Peña
- Ángel Fernández
- César González
- Raúl Maroto
- Manuel Pereira

Sweden

- Mats Ahlgren
- Jerri Bergström
- Thomas Lundblad
- Ulf Sandegren
- Péter Vánky

Unified Team

- Pavel Kolobkov
- Andrey Shuvalov
- Serhiy Kravchuk
- Sergey Kostarev
- Valery Zakharevich
