= Brazil at the 1992 Summer Olympics =

- IOC code: BRA
- NOC: Brazilian Olympic Committee

in Barcelona
- Competitors: 182 (132 men, 50 women) in 23 sports
- Flag bearer: Aurélio Miguel
- Medals Ranked 25th: Gold 2 Silver 1 Bronze 0 Total 3

Summer Olympics appearances (overview)
- 1920; 1924; 1928; 1932; 1936; 1948; 1952; 1956; 1960; 1964; 1968; 1972; 1976; 1980; 1984; 1988; 1992; 1996; 2000; 2004; 2008; 2012; 2016; 2020; 2024; 2028

Brazil competed at the 1992 Summer Olympics in Barcelona, Spain. 182 competitors, 132 men and 50 women, took part in 107 events in 23 sports. The Brazilian team won three medals in Barcelona. It was the lowest number since Montreal 1976, but unlike Montreal, two of the three medals were gold.

The swimmer Gustavo Borges was a silver medalist in men's 100 metre freestyle. It was the first medal won by Borges, who has four Olympic medals (a total record among all Brazilian swimmers).

The judoka Rogério Sampaio won the gold medal in men's 65 kg category. In the final, he defeated József Csák from Hungary.

Brazil men's national volleyball team made history by conquering the first gold medal ever won by Brazilians not only in Volleyball but also in a team sport event. The team won all the eight matches of the tournament and losing only three sets. The gold medal was a surprise, given the team was young, had not achieved significant results in previous competitions and Italy was the favorite. In the gold-medal match, Brazil defeated Netherlands by 3 sets to 0.

== Medalists ==
Medal	Name	Sport	Event	Date
Gold	Rogério Sampaio	Judo	Men's 65 kg	1 August
Gold	Brazil men's national volleyball team: Marcelo Negrão; Jorge Edson Brito; Giovane Gávio; Paulo Andre Silva; Mauricio Lima; Janelson Carvalho; Douglas Chiarotti; Antonio Carlos Gouveia; Talmo Oliveira; Alexandre Samuel; Andre Felipe Ferreira; Amauri Ribeiro	Volleyball	Men's tournament	9 August
Silver	Gustavo Borges	Swimming	Men's 100 metre freestyle	28 July

Medals by sport
Sport	1st place, gold medalist(s)	2nd place, silver medalist(s)	3rd place, bronze medalist(s)	Total
Judo	1	0	0	1
Volleyball	1	0	0	1
Swimming	0	1	0	1
Total	2	1	0	3

Medals by gender
Gender	1st place, gold medalist(s)	2nd place, silver medalist(s)	3rd place, bronze medalist(s)	Total
Male	2	1	0	3
Female	0	0	0	0
Mixed	0	0	0	0
Total	2	1	0	3

== Competitors ==
The following is the list of number of competitors in the Games.

Sport	Men	Women	Total
Archery	2	0	2
Athletics	21	3	24
Basketball	12	12	24
Boxing	4	–	4
Canoeing	6	0	6
Cycling	6	1	7
Diving	0	1	1
Equestrian	6	0	6
Fencing	4	0	4
Gymnastics	1	2	3
Handball	14	0	14
Judo	7	7	14
Rowing	8	0	8
Sailing	13	4	17
Shooting	1	1	2
Swimming	9	0	9
Synchronized swimming	-	3	3
Table tennis	2	2	4
Tennis	2	2	4
Volleyball	12	12	24
Weightlifting	1	–	1
wrestling	1	–	1
Total	132	50	182

== Archery ==
In its fourth Olympic archery competition, Brazil sent two men. Only one qualified for the elimination rounds, where he was defeated in the first match.

Men

Athlete	Event	Ranking round		Round of 32	Round of 16	Quarterfinals	Semifinals	Final / BM	
Athlete	Event	Score	Seed	Opposition Score	Opposition Score	Opposition Score	Opposition Score	Opposition Score	Rank
Emilio Dutra e Mello	Individual	1251	44	Did not advance					
Vítor Krieger	Individual	1277	29 Q	Yesheyev (EUN); L 95–106	Did not advance				

== Athletics ==
Men
Track & road events

Athlete	Event	Heat		Quarterfinal		Semifinal		Final	
Athlete	Event	Result	Rank	Result	Rank	Result	Rank	Result	Rank
Eronilde de Araújo	400 m hurdles	49.10	2 Q	—N/a		49.66	8	Did not advance	
José Luíz Barbosa	800 m	1:46.16	1 Q	—N/a		1:45.32	2 Q	1:45.06	4
Joilto Santos Bonfim	110 m hurdles	14.06	7	Did not advance					
Clodoaldo Lopes do Carmo	3000 m steeplechase	8:26.31	2 Q	—N/a		8:20.46	2 Q	8:25.92	11
Pedro Chiamulera	400 m hurdles	DNF		Did not advance					
Sérgio Galdino	20 km walk	—N/a						1:33:32	27
Ademar Kammler	20 km walk	—N/a						DNF	
Edgar Martins	1500 m	3:38.68	7 q	—N/a		3:42.53	12	Did not advance	
Sérgio de Menezes	200 m	21.17	3 Q	21.00	6	Did not advance			
Marcelo Palma	20 km walk	—N/a						1:40:11	32
Diamantino dos Santos	Marathon	—N/a						DNF	
André Domingos	100 m	10.78	5	Did not advance					
Arnaldo da Silva	100 m	10.78	2 Q	10.47	6	Did not advance			
Osmiro Silva	Marathon	—N/a						2:17.16	24
Robson da Silva	100 m	10.24	2 Q	10.29	2 Q	10.32	6	Did not advance	
Robson da Silva	200 m	20.62	1 Q	20.35	1 Q	20.15	3 Q	20.45	4
Joseildo Rocha da Silva	Marathon	—N/a						2:26.00	56
Sidney de Souza	200 m	20.72	2 Q	20.69	2 Q	20.88	7	Did not advance	
Sidney de Souza	400 m	45.92	3 Q	45.55	5	Did not advance			
Ediélson Tenório	400 m	46.31	5 q	46.34	6	Did not advance			
Eronilde de Araújo; Nelson Rocha; Sérgio Matias de Menezes; Sidney Telles de Souza; Robson da Silva	4 × 400 m relay	3:01.38	1 Q	—N/a				3:01.61	4

Field events

Athlete	Event	Qualification		Final	
Athlete	Event	Distance	Position	Distance	Position
Anísio Silva	Triple jump	16.03	29	Did not advance	
Jorge Luis Teixeira	Triple jump	15.64	38	Did not advance	

Combined events – Decathlon

Athlete	Event	100 m	LJ	SP	HJ	400 m	100H	DT	PV	JT	1500 m	Final	Rank
Pedro da Silva	Result	11.21	7.00	14.71	2.06	49.55	14.70	NM	DNS	Did not advance		DNF	
Pedro da Silva	Points	814	814	772	859	835	886	0				DNF	

Women
Track & road events

Athlete	Event	Heat		Quarterfinal		Semifinal		Final	
Athlete	Event	Result	Rank	Result	Rank	Result	Rank	Result	Rank
Janette Mayal	Marathon	—N/a						3:00.23	31
Márcia Narloch	Marathon	—N/a						2:44.32	17
Carmem de Oliveira	10,000 m	34:48.21	19	Did not advance					

== Basketball ==
Summary

Key:

- OT – Overtime.

Team	Event	Group stage						Quarterfinal	Semi-final	Final / BM	
Team	Event	Opposition Score	Opposition Score	Opposition Score	Opposition Score	Opposition Score	Rank	Opposition Score	Opposition Score	Opposition Score	Rank
Brazil men's	Men's tournament	Croatia; L 76–93	Spain; L 100–101	Angola; W 76–66	United States; L 87–123	Germany; W 85–76	3 Q	Lithuania; L 96–112	Puerto Rico; W 86–84	Australia; W 90–80	5
Brazil women's	Women's tournament	Italy; W 85–70	Cuba; L 88–95 (OT)	Unified Team; L 64–76	—N/a		3	—N/a	Czechoslovakia; L 62–74	Italy; W 86–83 (OT)	7

=== Men's ===
==== Preliminary round ====
Group A

Qualified for the quarterfinals

Team	W	L	PF	PA	PD	Pts	Tie
United States	5	0	579	350	+229	10	
Croatia	4	1	423	400	+23	9	
Brazil	2	3	420	463	−43	7	1–0
Germany	2	3	369	432	−63	7	0–1
Angola	1	4	324	392	−68	6	1–0
Spain	1	4	398	476	−78	6	0–1

July 26
22:30

Croatia	93–76	Brazil
Scoring by half: 55–40, 38–36

Palau Municipal d'Esports de Badalona, Barcelona

July 27
22:30

Brazil	100–101	Spain
Scoring by half: 43-53, 57-48

Palau Municipal d'Esports de Badalona, Barcelona

July 29
11:30

Brazil	76–66	Angola
Scoring by half: 42–26, 34–40

Palau Municipal d'Esports de Badalona, Barcelona

July 31
22:30

United States	127–83	Brazil
Scoring by half: 60–41, 67–42

Palau Municipal d'Esports de Badalona, Barcelona

August 2
9:30

Germany	76–85	Brazil
Scoring by half: 40–39, 36–46

Palau Municipal d'Esports de Badalona, Barcelona

==== Quarter-finals ====
August 4
16:30

Lithuania	114–96	Brazil
Scoring by half: 48–52, 66–44

Palau Municipal d'Esports de Badalona, Barcelona

==== Semifinals 5th−8th ====
August 6
14:30

Brazil	86–84	Puerto Rico
Scoring by half: 43–49, 43–35

Palau Municipal d'Esports de Badalona, Barcelona

==== 5th-place game ====
August 8
11:00

Brazil	90–80	Australia
Scoring by half: 44–38, 46–42

Palau Municipal d'Esports de Badalona, Barcelona

- Team Roster:
  - ( 4.) Paulo Villas Boas
  - ( 5.) Jorge Guerra
  - ( 6.) Gerson Victalino
  - ( 7.) João José Vianna
  - ( 8.) Rolando Ferreira
  - ( 9.) Ricardo Cardoso
  - (10.) Maury Ponickwar
  - (11.) Marcel Ponickwar
  - (12.) Aristides Santos
  - (13.) Wilson Fernando Kuhn
  - (14.) Oscar Schmidt
  - (15.) Israel Machado

=== Women's ===
==== Preliminary round ====
Group A

Qualified for the semifinals

Team	W	L	PF	PA	PD	Pts
Cuba	3	0	246	230	+16	6
CIS	2	1	244	222	+22	5
Brazil	1	2	237	241	−4	4
Italy	0	3	190	224	−34	3

July 30
22:00

Brazil	85–70	Italy
Scoring by half: 41–35, 44–35

Palau Municipal d'Esports de Badalona, Barcelona

August 1
13:00

Cuba	95–88 (OT)	Brazil
Scoring by half: 34–42, 46–38 Overtime: 15–8

Palau Municipal d'Esports de Badalona, Barcelona

August 3
11:00

CIS	76–64	Brazil
Scoring by half: 48–33, 28–31

Palau Municipal d'Esports de Badalona, Barcelona

==== Semifinals ====
August 5
11:00

Brazil	62–74	Czechoslovakia
Scoring by half: 34–24, 28–50

Palau Municipal d'Esports de Badalona, Badalona

==== 7th-place game ====
August 7
22:00

Brazil	86–83 (OT)	Italy
Scoring by half: 41–41, 37–37 Overtime: 8–5

Palau Municipal d'Esports de Badalona, Badalona

- Team Roster
  - Hortência Marcari
  - Janeth Arcain
  - Helen Cristina
  - Nádia Bento
  - Vânia Hernandes
  - Maria Paula Gonçalves
  - Adriana Santos
  - Marta Sobral
  - Ruth Roberta de Souza
  - Maria José Bertolotti
  - Joycenara Batista
  - Simone Pontello

== Boxing ==
Men

Athlete	Event	1 Round	2 Round	3 Round	Quarterfinals	Semifinals	Final
Athlete	Event	Opposition Result	Opposition Result	Opposition Result	Opposition Result	Opposition Result	Rank
Luís Claúdio Freitas	Flyweight	Gwang-Hyung Han (KOR); W 15-9	Benjamin Mwangata (TAN); L 7-8	Did not advance			
Rogério Brito	Featherweight	Steven Kevi (PNG); W 20-6	Ramazan Palyani (EUN); L 2-19	Did not advance			
Adilson Rosa Silva	Lightweight	Oscar De La Hoya (USA); L RSC-3	Did not advance				
Lucas França	Light Middleweight	Chalit Boonsingkarn (THA); L 2-16	Did not advance				

== Canoeing ==
=== Slalom ===
Athlete	Event	Preliminary				Final	
Athlete	Event	Run 1	Rank	Run 2	Rank	Best	Rank
Leonardo Selbach	Men's C-1	155.84	28	140.60	23	140.60	26
Marlon Grings	Men's K-1	125.86	30	120.82	22	120.82	30
Gustavo Selbach	Men's K-1	122.14	25	127.09	29	122.14	31

=== Sprint ===
Men

Athlete	Event	Heats		Repechages		Semifinals		Final	
Athlete	Event	Time	Rank	Time	Rank	Time	Rank	Time	Rank
Sebastián Cuattrin	K-1 500 m	1:48.86	7 Q	1:46.56	5	did not advance			
Sebastián Cuattrin	K-1 1000 m	4:09.13	7 Q	3:41.68	5	did not advance			
Alvaro Koslowski; Jefferson Lacerda	K-2 500 m	1:43.23	7 Q	1:37.15	6	did not advance			
Alvaro Koslowski; Jefferson Lacerda	K-2 1000 m	3:48.59	6 Q	3:31.45	6	did not advance			

== Cycling ==
Seven cyclists, six men and one woman, represented Brazil in 1992.

=== Road ===
Athlete	Event	Time	Rank
Tonny Azevedo	Men's road race	DNF	
Wanderley Magalhães Azevedo	Men's road race	4:35:56	28
Hernandes Quadri	Men's road race	DNF	
Claudia Carceroni	Women's road race	2:23:52	48
Fernando Louro; Euripides Ferreira; Márcio May; Hernandes Quadri	Team time trial	2:22:00	20

=== Track ===
Points race

Athlete	Event	Semifinal			Final		
Athlete	Event	Points	Laps behind	Rank	Points	Laps behind	Rank
Fernando Louro	Points race	5	1	14	Did not advance		

== Diving ==
Women

Athlete	Event	Preliminary		Final	
Athlete	Event	Points	Rank	Total	Rank
Silvana Neitzke	10 m platform	230.70	28	did not advance	

== Equestrianism ==
=== Eventing ===
Athlete	Horse	Event	Dressage		Cross-country			Jumping			Total	
Athlete	Horse	Event	Dressage		Cross-country			Final			Total	
Athlete	Horse	Event	Penalties	Rank	Penalties	Total	Rank	Penalties	Total	Rank	Penalties	Rank
Luciano Drubi	Xilena	Individual	82.20	74	240.80	69	323.00	69	5.00	9	328.00	60
Serguei Fofanoff	Kaiser Eden	Individual	71.20	59	EL		DNF	DNS			DNF	AC

=== Show jumping ===
Athlete	Horse	Event	Qualification								Final					Total	
Athlete	Horse	Event	Round 1		Round 2			Round 3			Round A		Round B			Total	
Athlete	Horse	Event	Penalties	Rank	Penalties	Total	Rank	Penalties	Total	Rank	Penalties	Rank	Penalties	Total	Rank	Penalties	Rank
Carlos da Motta	Wendy	Individual	19.00	69 Q	72.50	91.50	8 Q	64.00	155.50	26 Q	16	30	Did not advance				30
Nelson Pessoa Filho	Vivaldi	Individual	28.00	60 Q	39.50	67.50	65	Did not advance									65
Rodrigo Pessoa	Special Envoy	Individual	82.50	1 Q	56.00	138.50	28 Q	84.50	223.00	3 Q	4	6 Q	12	16	9	16	9
Vitor Teixeira	Attack Z	Individual	34.00	54 Q	44.00	78.00	44 Q	49.50	127.50	50	Did not advance						50
Carlos da Motta; Nelson Pessoa Filho; Rodrigo Pessoa; Vitor Teixeira		Team	—N/a								14.00 24.00 16.75 0.00	13	9.00 4.00 12.00 8.00	21.00	10	51.75	10

== Fencing ==
Four fencers, all male, represented Brazil in 1992.

Individual
Pool stage

Athlete	Event	Group Stage						
Athlete	Event	Opposition Result	Opposition Result	Opposition Result	Opposition Result	Opposition Result	Opposition Result	Rank
Luciano Finardi	Men's épée	Vánky (SWE); L 1–5	Shuvalov (EUN); L 2–5	Maroto (ESP); L 1–5	Al-Hamar (KUW); L 4–5	Milan (ROU); L 4–5	Ciszewski (POL); W 5–3	61
Roberto Lazzarini	Men's épée	Srecki (FRA); L 0–5	Kravchuk (EUN); W 5–2	Douba (TCH); W 5–5	Paul (GBR); W 5–2	Zakaria (INA); W 5–3	O'Loughlin (USA); L 1–5	27 Q
Francisco Papaiano	Men's épée	Mazzoni (ITA); L 0–5	Shong (CAN); L 0–5	Depta (TCH); L 3–5	Paz (COL); L 1–5	Lenzun (INA); L 4–5	Lang (SUI); W 5–2	63
Ricardo Menalda	Men's sabre	Szabo (ROU); L 3–5	Nolte (GER); L 3–5	Banos (CAN); L 3–5	Gniewkowski (POL); L 4–5	Mormando (USA); L 4–5	—N/a	37

Elimination phase

Athlete	Event	Round 1	Round 2	Round 3	Round 4	Repechage				Quarterfinals	Semifinals	Final	
Athlete	Event	Round 1	Round 2	Round 3	Round 4	Round 1	Round 2	Round 3	Round 4	Quarterfinals	Semifinals	Final	
Athlete	Event	Opposition Result	Opposition Result	Opposition Result	Opposition Result	Opposition Result	Opposition Result	Opposition Result	Opposition Result	Opposition Result	Opposition Result	Opposition Result	Rank
Roberto Lazzarini	Men's épée	Normile (USA); W 2–1	Pop (ROU); W 2–0	Vánky (SWE); L 1–2	Did not advance	—N/a	Depta (TCH); L 0–2	Did not advance					

== Gymnastics ==
=== Artistic ===
==== Men ====
Qualification

Athlete	Event	Qualification							
Athlete	Event	Apparatus						Total	Rank
Athlete	Event	F	PH	R	V	PB	HB	Total	Rank
Marco Monteiro	Individual	18.425	18.150	17.875	18.300	18.450	18.375	109.575	84

==== Women ====
Qualification

Athlete	Event	Qualification					
Athlete	Event	Apparatus				Total	Rank
Athlete	Event	V	UB	BB	F	Total	Rank
Luísa Parente	Individual	19.624	19.549	18.487	19.137	76.797	57

=== Rhythmic ===
Athlete	Event	Preliminary round						Final		
Athlete	Event	Rope	Hoop	Ball	Clubs	Total	Prelim Total	Total	Final Total	Rank
Marta Cristina Schonhurst	Individual	8.600	8.450	8.650	8.750	34,450	41	Did not advance		

== Handball ==
Summary

Key:

- ET: After extra time
- P – Match decided by penalty-shootout.

Team	Event	Group stage						Semifinal	Final / BM	
Team	Event	Opposition Score	Opposition Score	Opposition Score	Opposition Score	Opposition Score	Rank	Opposition Score	Opposition Score	Rank
Brazil men's	Men's tournament	Iceland; L 18–19	Hungary; L 21–27	Sweden; L 15–22	Czechoslovakia; L 16–27	South Korea; L 26–30	6	—N/a	Egypt; L 24–27 (P)	12

=== Men ===
==== Preliminary round ====
Group A

Team	Pld	W	D	L	GF	GA	GD	Points
Sweden	5	5	0	0	120	86	+44	10
Iceland	5	3	1	1	101	99	+2	7
South Korea	5	3	0	2	114	117	−3	6
Hungary	5	2	0	3	102	108	−6	4
Czechoslovakia	5	1	1	3	94	92	+2	3
Brazil	5	0	0	5	96	125	−29	0

Results	(Sweden)	(Iceland)	(South Korea)	(Hungary)	(Czechoslovakia)	(Brazil)
Sweden		25–18	28–18	25–21	20–14	22–15
Iceland	18–25		26–24	22–16	16–16	19–18
South Korea	18–28	24–26		22–18	20–19	30–26
Hungary	21–25	16–22	18–22		20–18	27–21
Czechoslovakia	14–20	16–16	19–20	18–20		27–16
Brazil	15–22	18–19	26–30	21–27	16–27	

==== 11th/12th classification ====
August 7
14:00
Egypt
27–24 (ET)
Brazil

(10-8)

FT: 19-19 ET: 22-22, 24-24

==== Team roster ====
  - José Luiz Aguiar e Ramalho
  - Sergio Carnasciali Cavichiolo
  - Drean Farencena Dutra
  - Milton Fonseca Pelissari
  - Rodrigo Hoffelder
  - Osvaldo Inocente Filho
  - Gilberto Jesus Cardoso
  - José Luiz Lopes Vieira
  - Ricardo Matos Pereira
  - Ivan Bruno Maziero
  - Marcelo Minhoto Ferraz
  - Paulo Rogerio Moratore
  - José Ronaldo Nascimiento
  - Claudio Oliveira Brito
  - Ivan Raimundo Pinheiro
  - Edson Roberto Rizzo
- Head coach: Antonio Carlos Simões

== Judo ==
Men

Athlete	Event	Round of 64	Round of 32	Round of 16	Quarterfinals	Semifinals	Repechage			Final	
Athlete	Event	Round of 64	Round of 32	Round of 16	Quarterfinals	Semifinals	Round 1	Round 2	Round 3	Final	
Athlete	Event	Opposition Result	Opposition Result	Opposition Result	Opposition Result	Opposition Result	Opposition Result	Opposition Result	Opposition Result	Opposition Result	Rank
Shigueto Yamasaki	60 kg	Bye	Šedivák (TCH); W	Kamrowski (POL); L	Did not advance						
Rogério Sampaio	65 kg	Bye	Almeida (POR); W	Kim S-m (KOR); W	Morales (ARG); W	Quellmalz (GER); W	—N/a			Csák (HUN); W	1st place, gold medalist(s)
Sérgio Oliveira	71 kg	Ruiz (ESP); L	Did not advance								
Ezequiel Paraguassu	78 kg	Bye	Matangi (ZIM); W	Kim B-j (KOR); L	Did not advance						
Wagner Castropil	86 kg	Bye	Bacon (AUS); L	Did not advance							
Aurélio Miguel	95 kg	Bye	Mbonga (ZAI); W	Sosna (TCH); W	Kovács (HUN); L	Did not advance	—N/a	Sergeyev (EUN); L	Did not advance		
José Mario Tranquillini	+95 kg	—N/a	Stoykov (BUL); L	Did not advance							

Women

Athlete	Event	Round of 32	Round of 16	Quarterfinals	Semifinals	Repechage			Final	
Athlete	Event	Round of 32	Round of 16	Quarterfinals	Semifinals	Round 1	Round 2	Round 3	Final	
Athlete	Event	Opposition Result	Opposition Result	Opposition Result	Opposition Result	Opposition Result	Opposition Result	Opposition Result	Opposition Result	Rank
Andrea Berti	48 kg	Bye	Tamura (JPN); L	Did not advance		Savón (CUB); L	Did not advance			
Patricia Bevilacqua	52 kg	Li (CHN); L	Did not advance			Grainger (AUS); W	Mariani (ARG); L	Did not advance		
Jemina Alves	56 kg	González (CUB); L	Did not advance			Gontowicz-Szałas (POL); L	Did not advance			
Tânia Ishii	61 kg	Zhang (CHN); L	Did not advance							
Rosicléia Campos	66 kg	Bye	Rakels (BEL); L	Did not advance						
Soraia André	72 kg	Bye	Horton (GBR); L	Did not advance		Bacher (USA); L	Did not advance			
Edilene Andrade	+72 kg	Sakaue (JPN); L	Did not advance			Rosensteel (USA); W	Weber (GER); L	Did not advance		

== Rowing ==
Men

Athlete	Event	Heats		Repechage		Semifinals		Final	
Athlete	Event	Time	Rank	Time	Rank	Time	Rank	Time	Rank
Claudio Tavares; Carlos de Almeida; Carlos Sobrinho	Coxed pairs	7:18.62	6 R	7:21.51	4	—N/a		7:32.49	13
Cleber Leite; Otavio Bandeira; José Augusto Loureiro Junior; José Ribeiro; Alexandre Fernandes	Coxed four	6:45.54	6 R	6:34.87	5	—N/a		6:22.00	12

== Sailing ==
Men

Athlete	Event	Race																				Final rank	
Athlete	Event	1		2		3		4		5		6		7		8		9		10		Final rank	
Athlete	Event	Score	Rank	Score	Rank	Score	Rank	Score	Rank	Score	Rank	Score	Rank	Score	Rank	Score	Rank	Score	Rank	Score	Rank	Score	Rank
George Mulin Rebello	Lechner A-390	22	28.0	~~DNF~~	~~51.0~~	4	8.0	23	29.0	13	19.0	27	33.0	15	21.0	24	30.0	23	29.0	16	22.0	219.0	19
Christoph Bergmann	Finn	1	0.0	8	14.0	~~16~~	~~22.0~~	13	19.0	9	15.0	10	16.0	14	20.0	—N/a						84.0	10
E. Costa Melchert; B. Muller Carioba Arndt	470	29	35.0	1	0.0	~~32~~	~~38.0~~	18	24.0	27	33.0	6	11.7	7	13.0	—N/a						116.7	13

Women

Athlete	Event	Race																				Final rank	
Athlete	Event	1		2		3		4		5		6		7		8		9		10		Final rank	
Athlete	Event	Score	Rank	Score	Rank	Score	Rank	Score	Rank	Score	Rank	Score	Rank	Score	Rank	Score	Rank	Score	Rank	Score	Rank	Score	Rank
Christina Mattoso Maia Forte	Lechner A-390	15	21.0	13	19.0	12	18.0	16	22.0	20	26.0	13	19.0	14	20.0	14	20.0	12	18.0	~~PMS~~	~~31.0~~	183.0	17
Márcia Pellicano	Europe	7	13.0	9	15.0	14	20.0	13	19.0	~~21~~	~~27.0~~	11	17.0	13	19.0	—N/a						103.0	14
Claudia Swan; Monica Scheel	470	~~PMS~~	~~24.0~~	4	8.0	17	23.0	12	18.0	16	22.0	12	18.0	6	11.7	—N/a						100.7	15

Open

Athlete	Event	Race														Final rank	
Athlete	Event	1		2		3		4		5		6		7		Final rank	
Athlete	Event	Score	Rank	Score	Rank	Score	Rank	Score	Rank	Score	Rank	Score	Rank	Score	Rank	Score	Rank
Alan Adler; Marcos Tenke	Flying Dutchman	20	26.0	6	11.7	5	10.0	8	14.0	~~23~~	~~29.0~~	17	23.0	12	18.0	102.7	13
Lars Grael; Clínio Freitas	Tornado	~~11~~	~~17.0~~	7	13.0	4	8.0	4	8.0	8	14.0	9	15.0	6	11.7	69.7	8
Torben Grael; Marcelo Ferreira	Star	8	14.0	2	3.0	17	23.0	6	11.7	~~PMS~~	~~33.0~~	DNC	33.0	8	14.0	98.7	11
José Paulo Dias; José Augusto Dias; Daniel Adler	Soling	16	22.0	13	19.0	5	10.0	11	17.0	9	15.0	~~17~~	~~23.0~~	—N/a		83.0	13

== Shooting ==
Men

Athlete	Event	Final	
Athlete	Event	Score	Rank
Wilson Scheidemantel	50 m pistol	545	35
Wilson Scheidemantel	10 m air pistol	568	42

Women

Athlete	Event	Final	
Athlete	Event	Score	Rank
Tania Giansante	25 m pistol	563	38
Tania Giansante	10 m air pistol	366	45

== Swimming ==
Men

Athlete	Event	Heat		Final B		Final A	
Athlete	Event	Time	Rank	Time	Rank	Time	Rank
Teófilo Ferreira	50 metre freestyle	24.13	41	did not advance			
Gustavo Borges	50 metre freestyle	23.10	15 q	23.01	13	did not advance	
Gustavo Borges	100 metre freestyle	49.49	2 Q	did not advance		49.43	Silver
Gustavo Borges	200 metre freestyle	1:51.42	22	did not advance			
Emanuel Nascimento	100 metre freestyle	51.17	25	did not advance			
Cristiano Michelena	200 metre freestyle	1:51.04	21	did not advance			
Rogério Romero	100 metre backstroke	57.28	21	did not advance			
Rogério Romero	200 metre backstroke	2:00.99	12 q	2:01.02	10	did not advance	
Eduardo Piccinini	100 metre butterfly	54.87	18	did not advance			
Eduardo Piccinini	200 metre butterfly	2:01.20	15 q	2:01.87	15	did not advance	
José Carlos Souza	100 metre butterfly	54.78	16 q	54.85	12	did not advance	
José Carlos Souza	200 m individual medley	2:07.09	30	did not advance			
André Teixeira	200 metre butterfly	2:01.39	19	did not advance			
Renato Ramalho	200 m individual medley	2:07.78	35	did not advance			
Renato Ramalho	400 m individual medley	4:29.28	22	did not advance			
José Carlos Souza; Cristiano Michelena; Emanuel Nascimento; Gustavo Borges	4 × 100 metre freestyle relay	3:20.50	5 Q	—N/a		3:20.99	6
Cristiano Michelena; Emanuel Nascimento; Gustavo Borges; Teófilo Ferreira	4 × 200 metre freestyle relay	7:24.20	7 Q	—N/a		7:24.03	7

== Synchronized swimming ==
Three synchronized swimmers represented Brazil in 1992.

Women

Athlete	Event	Preliminary				Final			
Athlete	Event	Technical	Free	Total	Rank	Points	Rank	Total	Rank
Gláucia Soutinho	Solo	89.68	83.383	173.063	16	did not advance			
Fernanda Veirano; Cristiana Lobo	Duet	81.151	90.68	171.831	15	did not advance			

== Table tennis ==
Men

Athlete	Event	Group Stage				Round of 16	Quarterfinal	Semifinal	Final	
Athlete	Event	Opposition Result	Opposition Result	Opposition Result	Rank	Opposition Result	Opposition Result	Opposition Result	Opposition Result	Rank
Hugo Hoyama	Singles	Mazunov (EUN); W 2–0	Al-Idokht (IRI); W 2–0	Saive (BEL); L 0–2	2	Did not advance				
Cláudio Kano	Singles	Vími (TCH); W 2–0	Botha (RSA); W 2–0	Grubba (POL); L 1–2	2	Did not advance				
Cláudio Kano; Hugo Hoyama	Doubles	Saive / Saive (BEL); L 0–2	Kim / Yoo (KOR); L 0–2	—N/a	3	Did not advance				

Women

Athlete	Event	Group Stage				Round of 16	Quarterfinal	Semifinal	Final	
Athlete	Event	Opposition Result	Opposition Result	Opposition Result	Rank	Opposition Result	Opposition Result	Opposition Result	Opposition Result	Rank
Monica Doti	Singles	Vriesekoop (NED); L 0–2	Gergelcheva (BUL); L 1–2	Kaffo (NGR); L 1–2	4	Did not advance				
Lyanne Kosaka	Singles	Hrachová (TCH); L 0–2	Hooman-Kloppenburg (NED); L 0–2	Kim de Rimasa (ARG); L 0–2	4	Did not advance				
Monica Doti; Lyanne Kosaka	Doubles	Vriesekoop / Hooman-Kloppenburg (NED); L 0–2	Perkučin / Fazlić (IOP); L 0–2	Tepper / Kwok (AUS); L 0–2	4	Did not advance				

== Tennis ==
Men

Athlete	Event	Round of 64	Round of 32	Round of 16	Quarterfinals	Semifinals	Final	
Athlete	Event	Opposition Result	Opposition Result	Opposition Result	Opposition Result	Opposition Result	Opposition Result	Rank
Luiz Mattar	Singles	Haarhuis (NED); L (6–4, 3–6, 2–6, 2–6)	Did not advance					
Jaime Oncins	Singles	Muškatirović (IOP); W (7–6^{3}, 4–6, 6–1, 4–6, 6–1)	Chang (USA); W (6–2, 3–6, 6–3, 6–3)	Koevermans (NED); W (7–6^{1}, 6–0, 7–6^{2})	Cherkasov (EUN); L (1–6, 4–6, 7–6^{3}, 6–4, 2–6)	Did not advance		
Luiz Mattar; Jaime Oncins	Doubles	—N/a	Casal / Sánchez (ESP); L (3–6, 6–3, 7–6^{4}, 3–6, 1–6)	Did not advance				

Women

Athlete	Event	Round of 64	Round of 32	Round of 16	Quarterfinals	Semifinals	Final	
Athlete	Event	Opposition Result	Opposition Result	Opposition Result	Opposition Result	Opposition Result	Opposition Result	Rank
Andrea Vieira	Singles	Maleeva (SUI); L (2–6, 3–6)	Did not advance					
Cláudia Chabalgoity; Andrea Vieira	Doubles	—N/a	Lindqvist / Lindström (SWE); W (6–2, 7–6^{5})	McQuillan / Provis (AUS); L (2–6, 1–6)	Did not advance			

== Volleyball ==
Summary

Team	Event	Group stage						Quarterfinal	Semifinal	Final	Rank
Team	Event	Opposition Score	Opposition Score	Opposition Score	Opposition Score	Opposition Score	Rank	Opposition Score	Opposition Score	Opposition Score	Rank
Brazil men's	Men's tournament	South Korea; W 3–0	Unified Team; W 3–1	Netherlands; W 3–0	Cuba; W 3–1	Algeria; W 3–0	1 Q	Japan; W 3–0	United States; W 3–1	Netherlands; W 3–0	1st place, gold medalist(s)
Brazil women's	Women's tournament	Netherlands; W 3–1	Cuba; L 1–3	China; W 3–2	—N/a		2 q	Japan; W 3–1	Unified Team; L 1–3	United States; L 0–3	4

=== Men ===
==== Preliminary round ====
Pool B

Pos	Team	Pld	W	L	Pts	SW	SL	SR	SPW	SPL	SPR	Qualification
1	Brazil	5	5	0	10	15	2	7.500	248	165	1.503	Quarterfinals
2	Cuba	5	4	1	9	13	5	2.600	231	180	1.283	Quarterfinals
3	Unified Team	5	3	2	8	11	7	1.571	229	205	1.117	Quarterfinals
4	Netherlands	5	2	3	7	8	9	0.889	218	181	1.204	Quarterfinals
5	South Korea	5	1	4	6	3	12	0.250	142	212	0.670	9th place match
6	Algeria	5	0	5	5	0	15	0.000	100	225	0.444	11th place match

Date		Score		Set 1	Set 2	Set 3	Set 4	Set 5	Total
26 Jul	Cuba	3–1	Netherlands	15–12	17–15	6–15	15–10		53–52
26 Jul	Unified Team	3–0	Algeria	15–8	15–7	15–4			45–19
26 Jul	Brazil	3–0	South Korea	15–13	16–14	15–7			46–34
28 Jul	Cuba	3–0	Algeria	15–4	15–2	15–3			45–9
28 Jul	Brazil	3–1	Unified Team	15–6	15–7	9–15	16–14		55–42
28 Jul	Netherlands	3–0	South Korea	15–5	15–5	15–7			45–17
30 Jul	South Korea	3–0	Algeria	15–8	15–11	15–12			45–31
30 Jul	Brazil	3–0	Netherlands	15–11	15–9	15–4			45–24
30 Jul	Cuba	3–1	Unified Team	8–15	15–10	15–12	15–5		53–42
01 Aug	Unified Team	3–0	South Korea	15–9	15–6	15–11			45–26
01 Aug	Netherlands	3–0	Algeria	15–2	15–5	15–4			45–11
01 Aug	Brazil	3–1	Cuba	15–6	15–8	12–15	15–6		57–35
03 Aug	Unified Team	3–1	Netherlands	8–15	15–9	17–16	15–12		55–52
03 Aug	Cuba	3–0	South Korea	15–5	15–7	15–8			45–20
03 Aug	Brazil	3–0	Algeria	15–8	15–13	15–9			45–30

==== Quarterfinals ====
Date		Score		Set 1	Set 2	Set 3	Set 4	Set 5	Total
05 Aug	Japan	0–3	Brazil	12–15	5–15	12–15			29–45

==== Semifinals ====
Date		Score		Set 1	Set 2	Set 3	Set 4	Set 5	Total
07 Aug	United States	1–3	Brazil	15–12	8–15	9–15	12–15		44–57

==== Gold-medal match ====
Date		Score		Set 1	Set 2	Set 3	Set 4	Set 5	Total
09 Aug	Netherlands	0–3	Brazil	12–15	8–15	5–15			25–45

=== Women ===
==== Preliminary round ====
Group B

Pos	Team	Pld	W	L	Pts	SW	SL	SR	SPW	SPL	SPR	Qualification
1	Cuba	3	3	0	6	9	2	4.500	151	129	1.171	Semifinals
2	Brazil	3	2	1	5	7	6	1.167	170	145	1.172	Quarterfinals
3	Netherlands	3	1	2	4	4	8	0.500	136	166	0.819	Quarterfinals
4	China	3	0	3	3	5	9	0.556	174	191	0.911	7th place match

Date		Score		Set 1	Set 2	Set 3	Set 4	Set 5	Total	Report
29 Jul	Netherlands	1–3	Brazil	9–15	3–15	15–11	7–15		34–56	Report
29 Jul	China	1–3	Cuba	15–13	11–15	9–15	11–15		46–58	Report
31 Jul	Netherlands	3–2	China	6–15	15–17	15–13	16–14	15–6	67–65	Report
31 Jul	Brazil	1–3	Cuba	11–15	15–3	13–15	9–15		48–48	Report
2 Aug	Cuba	3–0	Netherlands	15–11	15–11	15–13			45–35	Report
2 Aug	China	2–3	Brazil	9–15	15–7	11–15	16–14	12–15	63–66	Report

==== Quarterfinals ====
Date		Score		Set 1	Set 2	Set 3	Set 4	Set 5	Total	Report
4 Aug	Japan	1–3	Brazil	16–14	13–15	13–15	9–15		51–59	Report

==== Semifinals ====
Date		Score		Set 1	Set 2	Set 3	Set 4	Set 5	Total	Report
6 Aug	Unified Team	3–1	Brazil	15–10	13–15	15–5	15–5		58–35	Report

==== Bronze-medal match ====
Date		Score		Set 1	Set 2	Set 3	Set 4	Set 5	Total	Report
8 Aug	Brazil	0–3	United States	8–15	6–15	13–15			27–45	Report

== Weightlifting ==
Men

Athlete	Event	Snatch		Clean & Jerk		Total	Rank
Athlete	Event	Result	Rank	Result	Rank	Total	Rank
Emilson Dantas	100 kg	150.0	21	190.0	17	340.0	18

== Wrestling ==
Freestyle

Athlete	Event	Group Stage						Final	
Athlete	Event	Opposition Result	Opposition Result	Opposition Result	Opposition Result	Opposition Result	Rank	Opposition Result	Rank
Roberto Leitão	82 kg	Ghiță (ROU); L 1–16	Legrand (FRA); L 0–15	Did not advance			9	Did not advance	

== See also ==
- Brazil at the 1991 Pan American Games
