= Sweden at the 1992 Summer Olympics =

- IOC code: SWE
- NOC: Swedish Olympic Committee

in Barcelona, Spain 25 July-9 August
- Competitors: 187 (143 men, 44 women) in 22 sports
- Flag bearer: Stefan Edberg
- Medals Ranked 27th: Gold 1 Silver 7 Bronze 4 Total 12

Summer Olympics appearances (overview)
- 1896; 1900; 1904; 1908; 1912; 1920; 1924; 1928; 1932; 1936; 1948; 1952; 1956; 1960; 1964; 1968; 1972; 1976; 1980; 1984; 1988; 1992; 1996; 2000; 2004; 2008; 2012; 2016; 2020; 2024

Other related appearances
- 1906 Intercalated Games

Sweden competed at the 1992 Summer Olympics in Barcelona, Spain. 187 competitors, 143 men and 44 women, took part in 121 events in 22 sports.

== Medalists ==
Medal	Name	Sport	Event	Date
Gold	Jan-Ove Waldner	Table tennis	Men's singles	6 August
Silver	Anders Holmertz	Swimming	Men's 200 metre freestyle	26 July
Silver	Lars Frölander; Anders Holmertz; Christer Wallin; Tommy Werner	Swimming	Men's 4 × 200 metre freestyle relay	27 July
Silver	Tomas Johansson	Wrestling	Men's Greco-Roman 130 kg	29 July
Silver	Patrik Sjöberg	Athletics	Men's high jump	2 August
Silver	Agneta Andersson; Susanne Gunnarsson	Canoeing	Women's K-2 500 metres	7 August
Silver	Gunnar Olsson; Karl Sundqvist	Canoeing	Men's K-2 1000 metres	8 August
Silver	Sweden men's national handball team: Magnus Andersson; Robert Andersson; Anders Bäckegren; Per Carlén; Magnus Cato; Erik Hajas; Robert Hedin; Patrik Liljestrand; Ola Lindgren; Mats Olsson; Staffan Olsson; Axel Sjöblad; Tommy Suoraniemi; Tomas Svensson; Pierre Thorsson; Magnus Wislander	Handball	Men's tournament	8 August
Bronze	Ragnar Skanåker	Shooting	Men's 50 metre pistol	26 July
Bronze	Anders Holmertz	Swimming	Men's 400 metre freestyle	29 July
Bronze	Torbjörn Kornbakk	Wrestling	Men's Greco-Roman 74 kg	29 July
Bronze	Agneta Andersson; Maria Haglund; Anna Olsson; Susanne Rosenqvist	Canoeing	Women's K-4 500 metres	8 August

== Competitors ==
The following is the list of number of competitors in the Games.

Sport	Men	Women	Total
Archery	0	3	3
Athletics	15	4	19
Badminton	5	3	8
Boxing	3	–	3
Canoeing	8	5	13
Cycling	6	3	9
Diving	1	0	1
Equestrian	5	7	12
Fencing	6	0	6
Football	16	–	16
Gymnastics	1	0	1
Handball	16	0	16
Judo	3	3	6
Modern pentathlon	3	–	3
Rowing	6	1	7
Sailing	13	2	15
Shooting	5	2	7
Swimming	10	7	17
Table tennis	4	2	6
Tennis	4	2	6
Weightlifting	5	–	5
Wrestling	8	–	8
Total	143	44	187

== Archery ==
The Swedish women, despite not having a spectacular showing in the individual round, nearly knocked off the heavily favored Korean squad in the team round quarterfinals. The Swedes tied the Koreans at 240 in the 27-arrow match, forcing a shootout that the Koreans won to eliminate the Swedes from medal contention. No other team came within 12 points of the Koreans, and the Korean team's average margin against the three other nations it faced was nearly 20 points.

Women's Individual Competition:

- Jenny Sjöwall — Round of 32, 18th place (0-1)
- Liselotte Djerf — Round of 32, 28th place (0-1)
- Kristina Persson-Nordlander — Ranking round, 34th place (0-0)

Women's Team Competition:

- Sjöwall, Djerf, and Persson — Quarterfinal, 5th place (1-1)

== Athletics ==
Men's 400m Hurdles

- Niklas Wallenlind

- Heat — 48.71
- Semifinal — 48.35
- Final — 48.63 (→ 5th place)

- Sven Nylander

- Heat — 49.49
- Semifinal — 49.64 (→ did not advance)

Men's 5.000 metres

- Jonny Danielson

- Heat — 13:43.91 (→ did not advance)

Men's 20 km Walk

- Stefan Johansson — 1:28:37 (→ 15th place)

Men's 50 km Walk

- Stefan Johansson — 3:58:56 (→ 11th place)

Men's Decathlon

- Sten Ekberg — 8,136 points (→ 9th place)

Men's Triple Jump

- Tord Henriksson

- Qualification — 15.66 m (→ did not advance)

Men's Javelin Throw

- Dag Wennlund

- Qualification — 77.88 m (→ did not advance)

- Patrik Bodén

- Qualification — 77.70 m (→ did not advance)

- Peter Borglund

- Qualification — 74.72 m (→ did not advance)

Men's Hammer Throw

- Tore Gustafsson

- Qualification — 73.52 m (→ did not advance)

Men's Shot Put

- Sören Tallhem

- Qualification — 19.65 m
- Final — 19.32 m (→ 12th place)

- Kent Larsson

- Qualification — 18.56 m (→ did not advance)

Women's 400m Hurdles

- Frida Johansson

- Heat — 56.13
- Semifinal — 55.85 (→ did not advance)

- Monica Westén

- Heat — 56.68 (→ did not advance)

Women's 10 km Walk

- Madelein Svensson

- Final — 45:17 (→ 6th place)

== Cycling ==
Nine cyclists, six men and three women, represented Sweden in 1992.

Men's road race

- Michel Lafis
- Michael Andersson
- Glenn Magnusson

Men's team time trial

- Michael Andersson
- Björn Johansson
- Jan Karlsson
- Johan Fagrell

Women's road race

- Marie Höljer — 2:05:03 (→ 9th place)
- Elisabeth Westman — 2:05:03 (→ 27th place)
- Madeleine Lindberg — 2:05:46 (→ 38th place)

== Diving ==
Men's 3m Springboard

- Joakim Andersson

- Preliminary Round — 376.68 points
- Final — 562.74 points (→ 9th place)

== Fencing ==
Six male fencers represented Sweden in 1992.

Men's foil

- Ola Kajbjer

Men's épée

- Péter Vánky
- Thomas Lundblad
- Ulf Sandegren

Men's team épée

- Mats Ahlgren, Jerri Bergström, Thomas Lundblad, Ulf Sandegren, Péter Vánky

== Football ==
Summary

Key:

- W – Win D – Draw L – Loss
- A.E.T – After extra time.
- P – Match decided by penalty-shootout.

Team	Event	Group Stage				Quarterfinal	Semifinal	Final / BM	
Team	Event	Opposition Score	Opposition Score	Opposition Score	Rank	Opposition Score	Opposition Score	Opposition Score	Rank
Sweden men's	Men's tournament	Paraguay; D 0–0	Morocco; W 4–0	South Korea; D 1–1	1 Q	Australia; L 1–2	Did not qualify		6

=== Men's team competition ===
- Preliminary round (group C)

- Drew with Paraguay (0-0)
- Defeated Morocco (4-0)
- Drew with South Korea (1-1)

- Quarterfinals

- Lost to Australia (1-2) → Did not advance

- Team roster

- ( 1.) Jan Ekholm
- ( 2.) Magnus Johansson
- ( 3.) Joachim Björklund
- ( 4.) Filip Apelstav
- ( 5.) Niclas Alexandersson
- ( 6.) Håkan Mild
- ( 7.) Patrik Andersson
- ( 8.) Stefan Landberg
- ( 9.) Christer Fursth
- (10.) Johnny Rödlund
- (11.) Tomas Brolin
- (12.) Håkan Svensson
- (13.) Jesper Jansson
- (14.) Jörgen Moberg
- (15.) Björn Lilius
- (16.) Henrik Nilsson
- (17.) Anders Andersson
- (18.) Pascal Simpson
- (19.) Niklas Gudmundsson
- (20.) Jonas Axeldahl

- Head coach: Nisse Andersson

== Handball ==
Summary

Key:

- ET: After extra time
- P – Match decided by penalty-shootout.

Team	Event	Group Stage						Semifinal	Final / BM / Pl.	
Team	Event	Opposition Score	Opposition Score	Opposition Score	Opposition Score	Opposition Score	Rank	Opposition Score	Opposition Score	Rank
Sweden men's	Men's tournament	Czechoslovakia; W 20–14	South Korea; W 26–18	Brazil; W 22–15	Hungary; W 25–21	Iceland; W 25–18	1 Q	France; W 25–22	Unified Team; L 20–22	2nd place, silver medalist(s)

=== Men's team competition ===
- Preliminary round (group A)

- Sweden — Czechoslovakia 20-14
- Sweden — South Korea 26-18
- Sweden — Brazil 22-15
- Sweden — Hungary 25-21
- Sweden — Iceland 25-18

- Semi Finals

- Sweden — France 25-22

- Final

- Sweden — Unified Team 20-22 (→ Silver Medal)

- Team roster

- Magnus Andersson
- Robert Andersson
- Anders Bäckegren
- Per Carlén
- Magnus Cato
- Erik Hajas
- Robert Hedin
- Patrick Liljestrand
- Ola Lindgren
- Mats Olsson
- Staffan Olsson
- Axel Sjöblad
- Tommy Suoraniemi
- Tomas Svensson
- Pierre Thorsson
- Magnus Wislander

- Head coach: Bengt Johansson

== Judo ==
Half Lightweight, Men

- Jörgen Häggqvist (Note: also competed in the 1984 Summer Olympics) (=36th)

Lightweight, Men

- Anders Dahlin (=34th)

Half Middleweight, Men

- Lars Adolfsson (=5th)

Half Lightweight, Women

- Eva Wikström (=16th)

Lightweight, Women

- Ursula Myrén (=9th)

Half-Heavyweight, Women

- Katarina Håkansson (=7th)

== Modern pentathlon ==
Three male pentathletes represented Sweden in 1992.

Individual

- Håkan Norebrink
- Per Nyqvist
- Per-Olov Danielsson

Team

- Håkan Norebrink
- Per Nyqvist
- Per-Olov Danielsson

== Sailing ==
Men's Sailboard (Lechner A-390)

- Magnus Torell

- Final Ranking — 157.0 points (→ 13th place)

Women's Sailboard (Lechner A-390)

- Lisa Gullberg

- Final Ranking — 182.0 points (→ 16th place)

== Swimming ==
Men's 50m Freestyle

- Pär Lindström

- Heat — 22.92
- B-Final — 22.88 (→ 11th place)

Men's 100m Freestyle

- Tommy Werner

- Heat — 50.00
- Final — 49.63 (→ 6th place)

- Håkan Karlsson

- Heat — 50.73 (→ did not advance, 18th place)

Men's 200m Freestyle

- Anders Holmertz

- Heat — 1:46.76
- Final — 1:46.86 (→ Silver Medal)

- Tommy Werner

- Heat — 1:50.01 (→ 15th place)
- B-Final — Withdrew (→ no ranking)

Men's 400m Freestyle

- Anders Holmertz

- Heat — 3:49.95
- Final — 3:46.77 (→ Bronze Medal)

- Christer Wallin

- Heat — 4:02.14 (→ did not advance, 36th place)

Men's 100m Backstroke

- Rudi Dollmayer

- Heat — 58.26 (→ did not advance, 37th place)

Men's 100m Butterfly

- Rudi Dollmayer

- Heat — 57.27 (→ did not advance, 47th place)

Men's 200m Individual Medley

- Jan Bidrman

- Heat — DSQ (→ no ranking)

Men's 400m Individual Medley

- Jan Bidrman

- Heat — 4:22.96
- B-Final — 4:23.52 (→ 15th place)

Men's 4 × 100 m Freestyle Relay

- Göran Titus, Håkan Karlsson, Fredrik Letzler, and Tommy Werner

- Heat — 3:18.92

- Tommy Werner, Håkan Karlsson, Fredrik Letzler, and Anders Holmertz

- Final — 3:20.10 (→ 5th place)

Men's 4 × 200 m Freestyle

- Christer Wallin, Lars Frölander, Tommy Werner, and Anders Holmertz,

- Heat — 7:20.03

- Anders Holmertz, Tommy Werner, Christer Wallin, and Lars Frölander

- Final — 7:15.51 (→ Silver Medal)

Women's 50m Freestyle

- Linda Olofsson

- Heat — 26.43
- B-Final — 26.51 (→ 15th place)

- Louise Karlsson

- Heat — 26.77 (→ did not advance, 23rd place)

Women's 100m Freestyle

- Eva Nyberg

- Heat — 57.36 (→ did not advance, 19th place)

- Ellenor Svensson

- Heat — 58.03 (→ did not advance, 23rd place)

Women's 200m Freestyle

- Malin Nilsson

- Heat — 2:03.44
- B-Final — 2:02.02 (→ 12th place)

Women's 400m Freestyle

- Malin Nilsson

- Heat — 4:13.16
- Final — 4:14.10 (→ 7th place)

Women's 100m Butterfly

- Therèse Lundin

- Heat — 1:01.38
- B-Final — 1:01.43 (→ 12th place)

- Malin Strömberg

- Heat — 1:02.78 (→ did not advance, 24th place)

Women's 200m Individual Medley

- Louise Karlsson

- Heat — 2:18.75 (→ did not advance, 17th place)

Women's 4 × 100 m Freestyle Relay

- Eva Nyberg, Louise Karlsson, Ellenor Svensson, and Linda Olofsson

- Heat — 3:48.15

- Eva Nyberg, Louise Karlsson, Ellenor Svensson, and Malin Nilsson

- Final — 3:48.47 (→ 7th place)

== Tennis ==
Men's Singles Competition:

- Stefan Edberg

- First round — Lost to Andrei Chesnokov (Unified Team) 0-6, 4-6, 4-6

- Magnus Larsson

- First round — Defeated Horst Skoff (Austria) 6-2, 6-2, 6-3
- Second round — Defeated Guy Forget (France) 6-3, 6-3, 6-1
- Third round — Lost to Emilio Sánchez (Spain) 4-6, 6-7, 7-6, 4-6

- Magnus Gustafsson

- First round — Defeated Owen Casey (Ireland) 7-6, 6-1, 6-4
- Second round — Lost to Jordi Arrese (Spain) 2-6, 6-4, 1-6, 6-3, 7-9

Men's Doubles Competition:

- Stefan Edberg and Anders Järryd

- First round — Lost to Jim Courier and Pete Sampras (USA) 6-1, 3-6, 6-4, 6-7, 4-6

Women's Singles Competition

- Catarina Lindqvist

- First Round — Lost to Angélica Gavaldón (Mexico) 4-6, 3-6
