= Sailing at the 1992 Summer Olympics – Women's Lechner A-390 =

Sailing at the Olympics

Lechner A-390 Women's at the Games of the XXV Olympiad
- Lechner A-390
- Venue: Barcelona
- Dates: 27 July to 11 September 2001
- Competitors: 24 from 34 nations
- Teams: 24

Medalists
1st place, gold medalist(s)		Barbara Kendall	New Zealand
2nd place, silver medalist(s)		Zhang Xiaodong	China
3rd place, bronze medalist(s)		Dorien de Vries	Netherlands

The Women's Sailboard (Lechner A-390) Competition at the 1992 Summer Olympics was held from 27 July to 4 August 1992, in Barcelona, Spain. Points were awarded for placement in each race. Best nine out of ten scores did count for the final placement.

== Results ==
Rank	Helmsman (Country)	Race I		Race II		Race III		Race IV		Race V		Race VI		Race VII		Race VIII		Race IX		Race X		Total Points	Total -1
Rank	Helmsman (Country)	Rank	Points	Rank	Points	Rank	Points	Rank	Points	Rank	Points	Rank	Points	Rank	Points	Rank	Points	Rank	Points	Rank	Points	Total Points	Total -1
1	Barbara Kendall (NZL)	1	0.0	~~10~~	~~16.0~~	3	5.7	2	3.0	1	0.0	2	3.0	6	11.7	7	13.0	3	5.7	3	5.7	63.8	47.8
2	Zhang Xiaodong (CHN)	2	3.0	5	10.0	6	11.7	6	11.7	3	5.7	3	5.7	1	0.0	5	10.0	4	8.0	~~8~~	~~14.0~~	79.8	65.8
3	Dorien de Vries (NED)	5	10.0	2	3.0	4	8.0	4	8.0	7	13.0	5	10.0	4	8.0	3	5.7	2	3.0	~~PMS~~	~~31.0~~	99.7	68.7
4	Maud Herbert (FRA)	9	15.0	1	0.0	5	10.0	5	10.0	12	18.0	1	0.0	5	10.0	9	15.0	1	0.0	~~PMS~~	~~31.0~~	109.0	78.0
5	Lanee Butler (USA)	6	11.7	11	17.0	13	19.0	11	17.0	2	3.0	~~14~~	~~20.0~~	7	13.0	1	0.0	9	15.0	1	0.0	115.7	95.7
6	Penny Way (GBR)	4	8.0	3	5.7	7	13.0	3	5.7	5	10.0	8	14.0	~~DNF~~	~~31.0~~	10	16.0	5	10.0	11	17.0	130.4	99.4
7	Alessandra Sensini (ITA)	13	19.0	6	11.7	1	0.0	1	0.0	4	8.0	4	8.0	3	5.7	12	18.0	~~PMS~~	~~31.0~~	PMS	31.0	132.4	101.4
8	Jorunn Horgen (NOR)	17	23.0	9	15.0	2	3.0	7	13.0	9	15.0	10	16.0	2	3.0	2	3.0	6	11.7	~~PMS~~	~~31.0~~	133.7	102.7
9	Joanna Burzyńska (POL)	10	16.0	8	14.0	9	15.0	~~DSQ~~	~~31.0~~	10	16.0	6	11.7	11	17.0	11	17.0	7	13.0	2	3.0	153.7	122.7
10	Fiona Taylor (AUS)	7	13.0	7	13.0	8	14.0	8	14.0	11	17.0	15	21.0	12	18.0	8	14.0	~~14~~	~~20.0~~	7	13.0	157.0	136.0
11	Lee Lai Shan (HKG)	12	18.0	12	18.0	11	17.0	~~14~~	~~20.0~~	8	14.0	12	18.0	8	14.0	16	22.0	10	16.0	4	8.0	165.0	143.0
12	Mireia Casas (ESP)	14	20.0	4	8.0	18	24.0	10	16.0	18	24.0	7	13.0	~~PMS~~	~~31.0~~	4	8.0	PMS	31.0	6	11.7	186.7	155.7
13	Lisa Neuburger (ISV)	20	26.0	14	20.0	15	21.0	9	15.0	14	20.0	9	15.0	9	15.0	6	11.7	11	17.0	~~PMS~~	~~31.0~~	191.7	160.7
14	Caroll-Ann Alie (CAN)	3	5.7	16	22.0	14	20.0	15	21.0	21	27.0	11	17.0	10	16.0	13	19.0	8	14.0	~~PMS~~	~~31.0~~	192.7	161.7
15	Christ'l Smet (BEL)	8	14.0	20	26.0	10	16.0	12	18.0	16	22.0	19	25.0	13	19.0	17	23.0	~~PMS~~	~~31.0~~	10	16.0	210.0	179.0
16	Lisa Gullberg (SWE)	11	17.0	~~17~~	~~23.0~~	16	22.0	17	23.0	13	19.0	17	23.0	15	21.0	15	21.0	15	21.0	9	15.0	205.0	182.0
17	Christina Forte (BRA)	15	21.0	13	19.0	12	18.0	16	22.0	20	26.0	13	19.0	14	20.0	14	20.0	12	18.0	~~PMS~~	~~31.0~~	214.0	183.0
18	María Espínola (ARG)	18	24.0	19	25.0	17	23.0	13	19.0	6	11.7	18	24.0	18	24.0	19	25.0	13	19.0	~~PMS~~	~~31.0~~	225.7	194.7
19	Lucía Martínez (PUR)	16	22.0	15	21.0	20	26.0	19	25.0	15	21.0	16	22.0	16	22.0	18	24.0	16	22.0	~~PMS~~	~~31.0~~	236.0	205.0
20	Amara Wichithong (THA)	19	25.0	~~21~~	~~27.0~~	21	27.0	21	27.0	19	25.0	21	27.0	17	23.0	21	27.0	18	24.0	5	10.0	242.0	215.0
21	Ilona Dzelme (LAT)	21	27.0	~~22~~	~~28.0~~	19	25.0	20	26.0	17	23.0	22	28.0	19	25.0	20	26.0	19	25.0	12	18.0	251.0	223.0
22	Elisabeth de Waard (AHO)	22	28.0	18	24.0	~~22~~	~~28.0~~	18	24.0	22	28.0	20	26.0	20	26.0	22	28.0	17	23.0	13	19.0	254.0	226.0
23	Marie Menage (MRI)	23	29.0	23	29.0	~~DNC~~	~~31.0~~	22	28.0	23	29.0	23	29.0	DNC	31.0	23	29.0	20	26.0	DNC	31.0	292.0	261.0
24	Linda Yeomans (GUM)	24	30.0	~~DNC~~	~~31.0~~	23	29.0	DNC	31.0	24	30.0	DNC	31.0	DNC	31.0	24	30.0	21	27.0	DNC	31.0	301.0	270.0

=== Daily standings ===
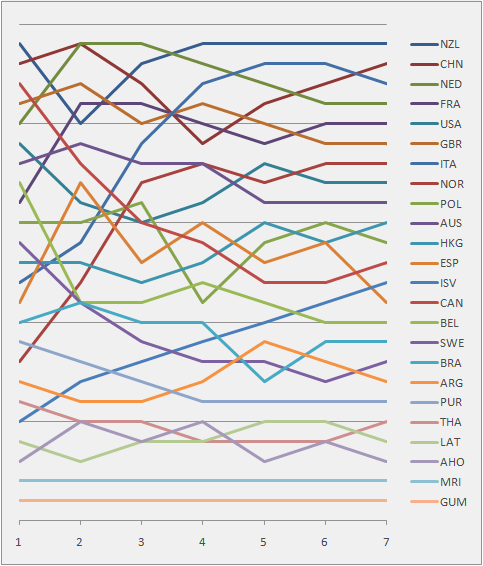
Graph showing the daily standings in the Lechner Women's during the 1992 Summer Olympics
