= Mihăilescu =

Mihăilescu is a Romanian surname. Notable people with the surname include:

- Alexandru Mihailescu (born 1982), Romanian athlete
- Nicolae Mihăilescu (born 1965), Romanian fencer
- Preda Mihăilescu (born 1955), Romanian mathematician
- Vintilă Mihăilescu (1951–2022), Romanian cultural anthropologist
- Ștefan Mihăilescu-Brăila (1925–1996), Romanian actor
- Anca Grigoraș (later Mihăilescu; born 1957), Romanian artistic gymnast
