= Scott Arnold =

Scott Arnold may refer to:

- Scott Arnold (baseball) (born 1962), American baseball player
- Scott Arnold (fencer) (born 1965), Australian fencer
- Scott Arnold (golfer) (born 1985), Australian golfer
- Scott Arnold (ice hockey) (born 1989), Canadian ice hockey player
- Scott Arnold (squash player) (born 1986), Australian squash player
