= Ciszewski =

Ciszewski (Polish pronunciation: [tɕiˈʂɛfski]; feminine: Ciszewska; plural: Ciszewscy) is a surname of Polish-language origin. It may refer to:

- Carola Ciszewski (born 1968), German handball player
- Józef Ciszewski (1904–1987), Polish footballer
- Maciej Ciszewski (born 1971), Polish fencer
