= Marie Menage =

Mauritian windsurfer

Pascale Menagé
Personal information
- Birth name: Marie Pascale Menage
- Nationality: Mauritian
- Born: 16 June 1967 (age 57)

Sport
- Sport: Windsurfing

Marie Pascale Menage (born 16 June 1967) is a Mauritian windsurfer. She competed in the women's Lechner A-390 event at the 1992 Summer Olympics. Won four gold medals in windsurfing at the Indian Ocean games from 1985 to 2003.
