= Linda Yeomans =

Guamanian windsurfer

Personal information
- Nationality: Guamanian
- Born: 18 August 1951 (age 73)

Sport
- Sport: Windsurfing

Linda Yeomans (born 18 August 1951) is a Guamanian windsurfer. She competed in the women's Lechner A-390 event at the 1992 Summer Olympics.
