= Fiona Taylor =

Australian windsurfer

Personal information
- Full name: Fiona Cynthia Taylor
- Born: 9 May 1971 (age 55) Melbourne, Australia

Sailing career
- Country: Australia
- Sport: Sailing
- Classes: Mistral, Lechner

Fiona Cynthia Taylor (born 29 May 1971) is an Australian windsurfer who competed in the 1992 Summer Olympics. Born in Melbourne, Taylor represented Australia in the women's Lechner event and finished in tenth place.

In the early 2000s Taylor founded a coaching company, Barakaya, and published two books. Spirit in Sport : Peak performance and the zone in sport covers her winning seven windsurfing world titles and includes interviews with 15 other World and Olympic champions, while An Olympian's Guide to Weight Loss discusses her personal weight loss experience.
