= Elisabeth de Waard =

Dutch Antillean windsurfer

Personal information
- Nickname: Bep
- Nationality: Netherlands Antillean
- Born: Elisabeth Maria de Waard; 8 May 1958 (age 68)

Sailing career
- Sport: Sailing
- Class: Lechner

Elisabeth "Bep" Maria de Waard (born 8 May 1958) is a Netherlands Antillean windsurfer. She competed in the women's Lechner A-390 event at the 1992 Summer Olympics.
