= Christ'l Smet =

Belgian windsurfer

Personal information
- Nationality: Belgian
- Born: 14 March 1961 (age 64); Willebroek, Belgium
- Height: 172 cm (5 ft 8 in)
- Weight: 68 kg (150 lb; 10 st 10 lb)

Sport
- Sport: Windsurfing

Christ'l Smet (born 14 March 1961) is a Belgian windsurfer. She competed in the women's Lechner A-390 event at the 1992 Summer Olympics.
