= Adrian Pop =

Romanian fencer (born 1968)

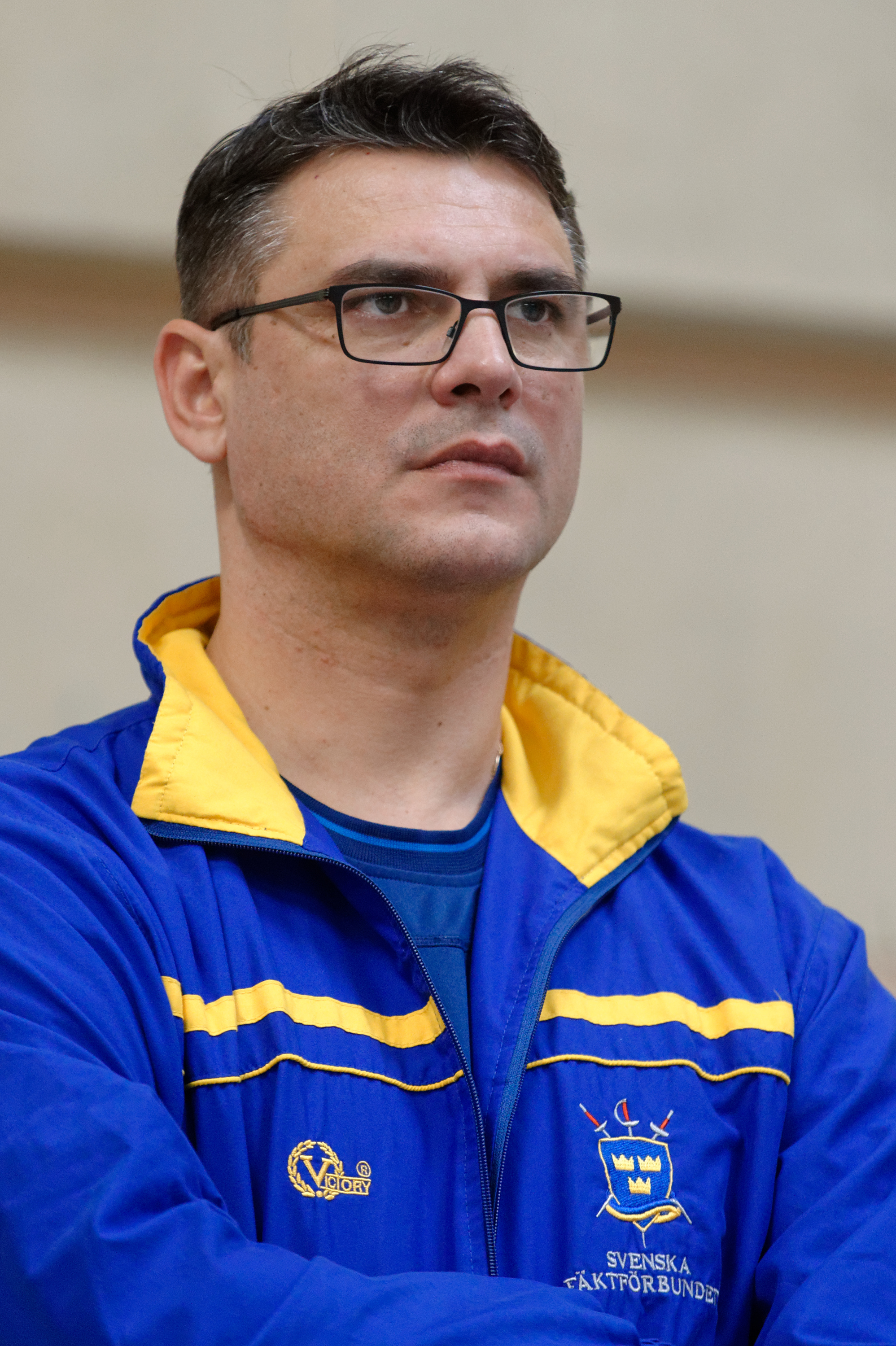

Personal information
- Born: 13 February 1968 (age 58) Satu Mare, Romania

Fencing career
- Sport: Fencing
- Weapon: épée
- Hand: right-handed
- Club: Kungsbacka FK 1999
- FIE ranking: former ranking

Adrian Pop (born 13 February 1968) is a Romanian épée fencer. He competed in the individual and team épée events at the 1992 Summer Olympics.

== Career ==
Pop took up fencing at CSS Satu Mare when he was seven years old to follow the steps of a girl he was in love with. He was coached first in foil by Eva Lenghel, then in épée by Alexandru Csipler, one of the founders of the Satmarean school of fencing. He won his first national title in épée, in the junior category, when he was 15 years old. He took the fourth place in the 1986 Junior World Championship in Stuttgart and earned his first senior Romanian Cup at the age of 17. This good results cause him to be selected into the senior national team, with which he took part in the 1987 World Championships in Sofia. Pop qualified for the 1992 Summer Olympics in Barcelona. He was defeated by Brazil's Roberto Lazzarini in the second round and finished 25th. In the team event Romania ranked 11th.

After his retirement from the national team as an athlete Pop became a coach in Satu Mare. In 2004 he relocated to Kungsbacka in Sweden and took a coaching position at FK 1999. He continued taking part in international fencing competitions in Scandinavia, winning two satellite World Cup events: the Trekanten Open in the 2006–07 season and the SAF Pokalen in 2011. He trains the Sweden junior national team since 2008. After two members of the senior team, Emma Samuelsson and Sanne Gars, came to train at his club, he became assistant coach of the Olympic team, coached by Björne Väggö.
