= Emma Samuelsson =

Swedish épée fencer

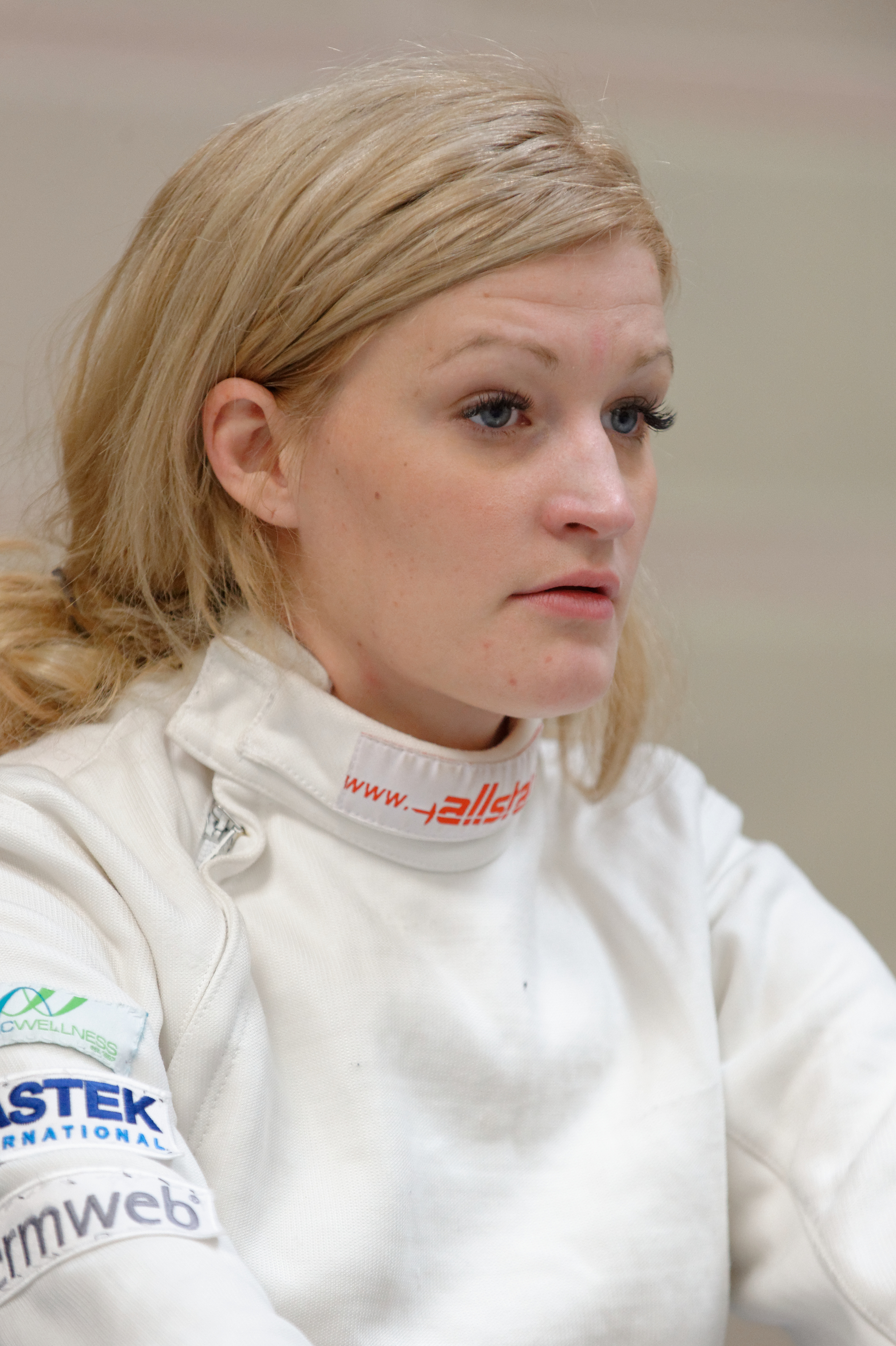

Personal information
- Born: 17 October 1988 (age 37) Åsa, Kungsbacka, Sweden
- Home town: Gothenburg
- Height: 1.78 m (5 ft 10 in)
- Weight: 62 kg (137 lb)

Fencing career
- Sport: Fencing
- Weapon: Épée
- Hand: left-handed
- National coach: Björne Väggö
- Club: Göteborgs Fäktklubb
- Assistant coach: Adrian Pop
- FIE ranking: current ranking
Medal record
World Championships
Silver medal – second place	2015 Moscow	Individual
European Fencing Championships
Silver medal – second place	2007 Ghent	Individual

Emma Katinka Renée Samuelsson (born 17 October 1988) is a Swedish épée fencer, silver medallist in the 2007 European Championships.

== Career ==
Coached by Ukrainian master Sergey Paramonov, she won a bronze medal in the 2006 Junior World Championships in Taebaek, followed by a gold medal in the 2007 edition in Belek. That same year, she took part in her first European Championships. She reached the final after defeating Russia's Tatiana Logunova and Estonia's Irina Embrich, but was overcome in the final by France's Laura Flessel. A scholarship from Swedish newspaper Svenska Dagbladet allowed her to train harder.

She received a wildcard for the 2008 Olympic Games in Beijing, but lost in the quarter-finals to Germany's Britta Heidemann, who eventually became Olympic champion. In the 2009–10 season she climbed her first World Cup podium with a second place in Barcelona, followed by another silver medal in Luxembourg. She finished the season no.21 in world rankings, a career best as to 2015.

In the 2011–12 season she won the Saint-Maur World Cup after prevailing over China's Sun Yujie. She sought to qualify to the 2012 Olympic Games, but failed against Laura Flessel-Colovic in the semifinal of the European qualifying tournament in Bratislava.

In 2015, she failed to qualify to the final table of 64 in the Ciutat de Barcelona tournament, but lead Sweden to their first team World Cup victory since the 1970s. They defeated Australia, Hungary, Switzerland and Romania before meeting Italy in the final. Samuelsson reversed an Italian 12–16 lead and defeated reigning world champion Rossella Fiamingo on the last relay to close on 45–33 for Sweden.
