= Zhang Xiaodong =

Chinese Olympic windsurfer (born 1964)

Personal information
- Born: January 4, 1964 (age 62) Zhanjiang, Guangdong, China
- Height: 171 cm (5 ft 7 in)
- Weight: 61 kg (134 lb)

Sailing career
- Sport: Sailing
- Classes: Lechner, Mistral
Medal record
Women's sailing
Representing China
Olympic Games
Silver medal – second place	1992 Barcelona	Lechner A-390
Asian Games
Gold medal – first place	1990 Beijing	Mistral

Zhang Xiaodong (Chinese: 張小冬, born January 4, 1964) is a Chinese sailor. She won the silver medal in Women's Windsurfer in the 1992 Summer Olympics in Barcelona.
