= Joanna Burzyńska =

Polish windsurfer

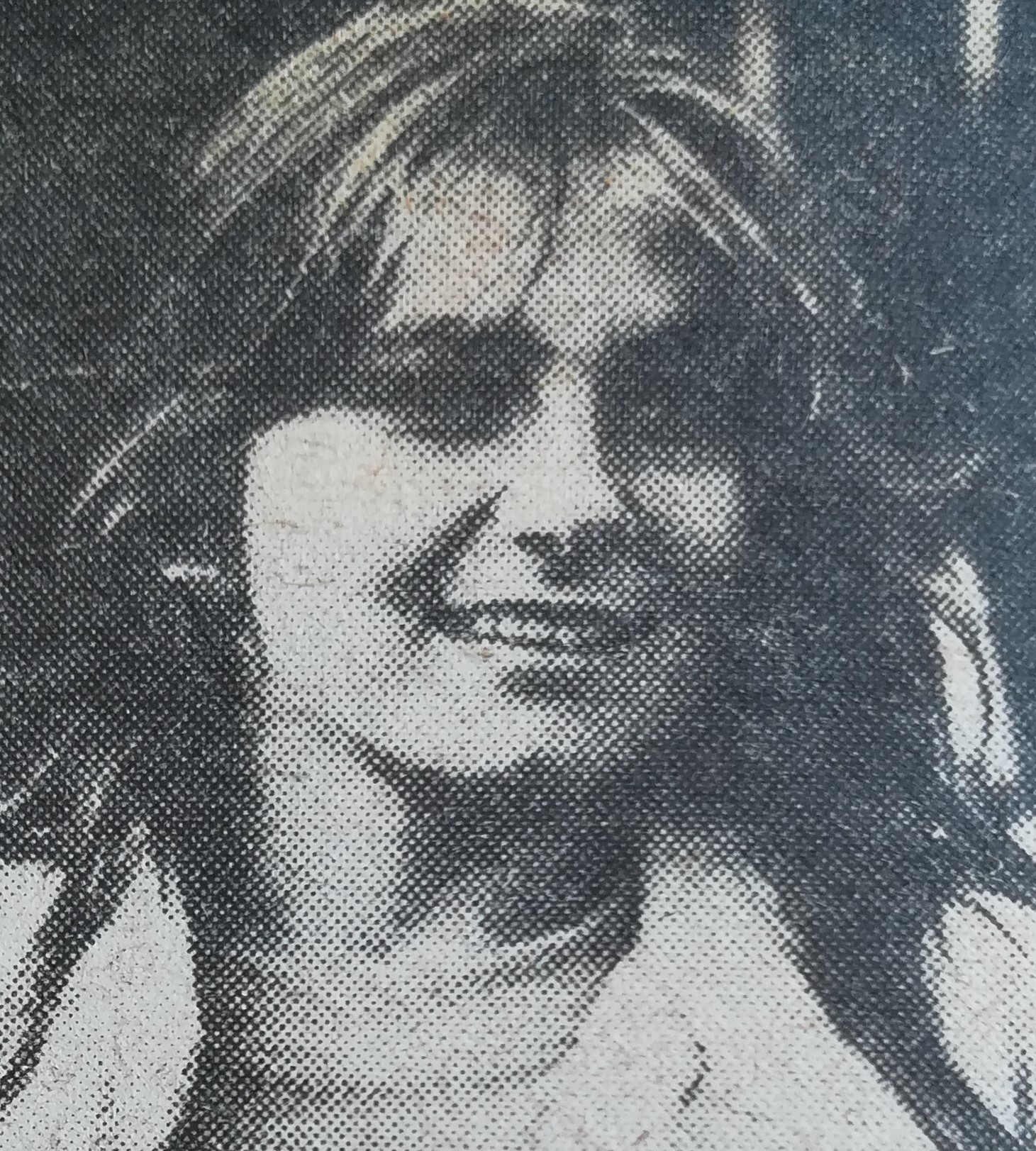

Personal information
- Born: 28 July 1968 (age 56); Drygały, Poland
- Height: 170 cm (5 ft 7 in)
- Weight: 66 kg (146 lb)

Sailing career
- Class(es): Lechner, Mistral
- Club: Bazy Mragowo

Joanna Burzyńska (born 28 July 1968) is a Polish windsurfer. She placed 9th in the women's Lechner A-390 event at the 1992 Summer Olympics.
