= Paulo Moratore =

Brazilian handball player (born 1968)

Personal information
- Born: 9 May 1968 (age 56); São Paulo, Brazil

Sport
- Sport: Handball

Paulo Moratore (born 9 May 1968) is a Brazilian handball player. He competed at the 1992 Summer Olympics and the 1996 Summer Olympics.
