= Robert Felisiak =

German fencer

Personal information
- Born: 11 October 1962 (age 63) Wrocław, Poland

Sport
- Sport: Fencing
Medal record
Men's fencing
Olympic Games
Representing Germany
Gold medal – first place	1992 Barcelona	Épée, team

Robert Felisiak (born 11 October 1962) is a German fencer. He won a gold medal in the team épée event at the 1992 Summer Olympics. He also competed for Poland (until 1987).
