= Sławomir Zwierzyński =

Polish fencer

Personal information
- Born: 20 November 1966 (age 59) Warsaw, Polish People's Republic

Sport
- Sport: Fencing

Sławomir Zwierzyński (born 20 November 1966) is a Polish fencer. He competed in the team épée events at the 1992 Summer Olympics.
