= Amara Wichithong =

Thai windsurfer

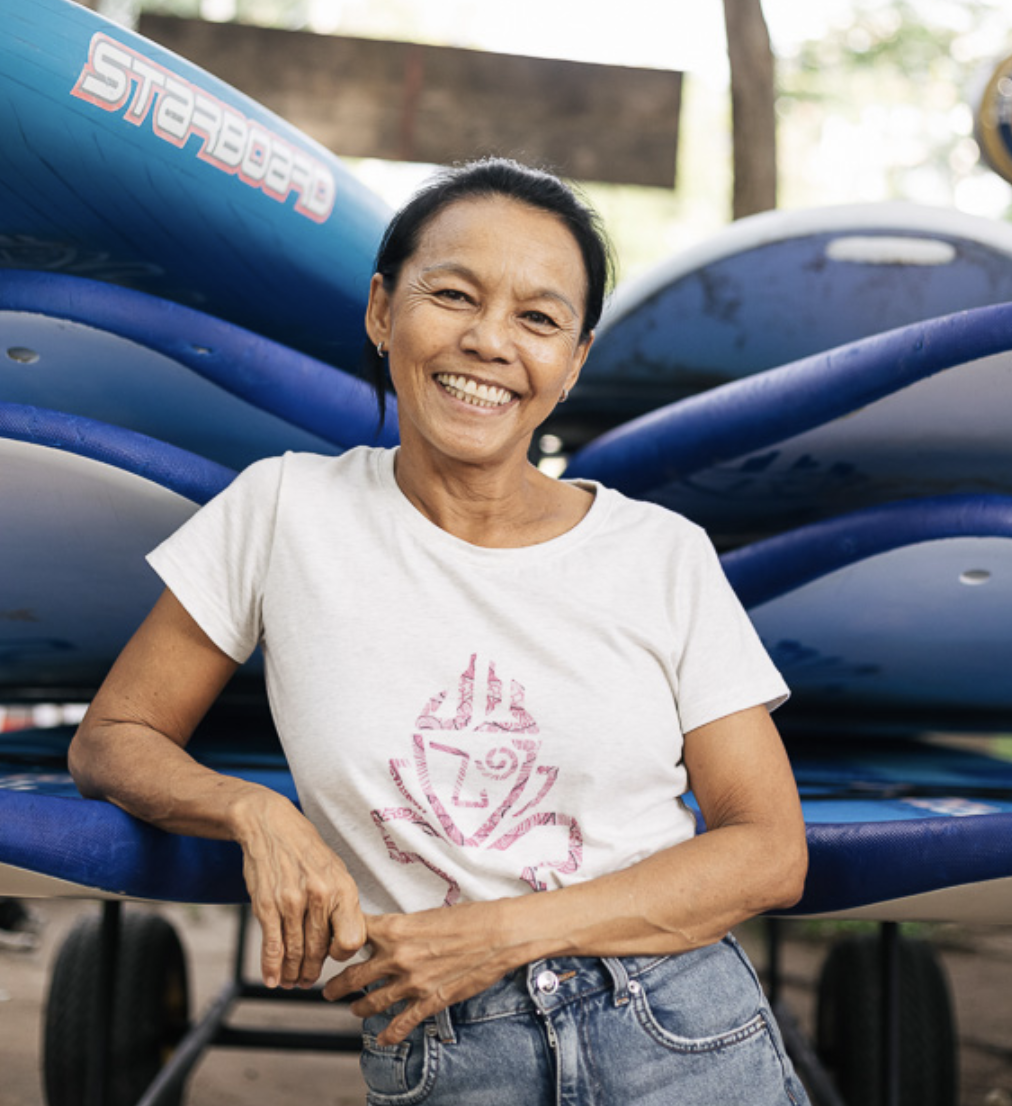

Personal information
- Native name: อมรา วิจิตรหงษ์
- Full name: Amara Wichithong
- Nationality: Thai
- Born: April 27, 1963 (age 63) Ayutthaya, Thailand
- Years active: 1978–present
- Website: amarawatersports.com

Sport
- Sport: Windsurfing

Amara Wichithong (born April 1963) is a pioneering Thai windsurfer recognized as the country's first female competitive board sailor. Over a distinguished career spanning more than thirty years, she secured over 200 regional and international titles, helping to popularize windsurfing in Southeast Asia. Wichithong represented Thailand at the 1992 Summer Olympics in the women’s Lechner A-390 event.

She founded a watersports school in Pattaya and has since been a committed advocate for marine conservation and environmental education, leading numerous community initiatives promoting sustainability.

She has been bestowed with the Royal Honorary Pin (Rak Tha-lay Ying Cheep) and the Sports Positive Award 2024 (Asia) for her extensive contribution to the protection, conservation, and restoration of marine and coastal natural resources in Thailand.

== Career and Legacy ==
Amara Wichithong is one of Thailand's most accomplished windsurfers, and a pioneer of the sport in Southeast Asia. She represented Thailand at the 1992 Summer Olympics in the women's Lechner A-390 windsurfing event.

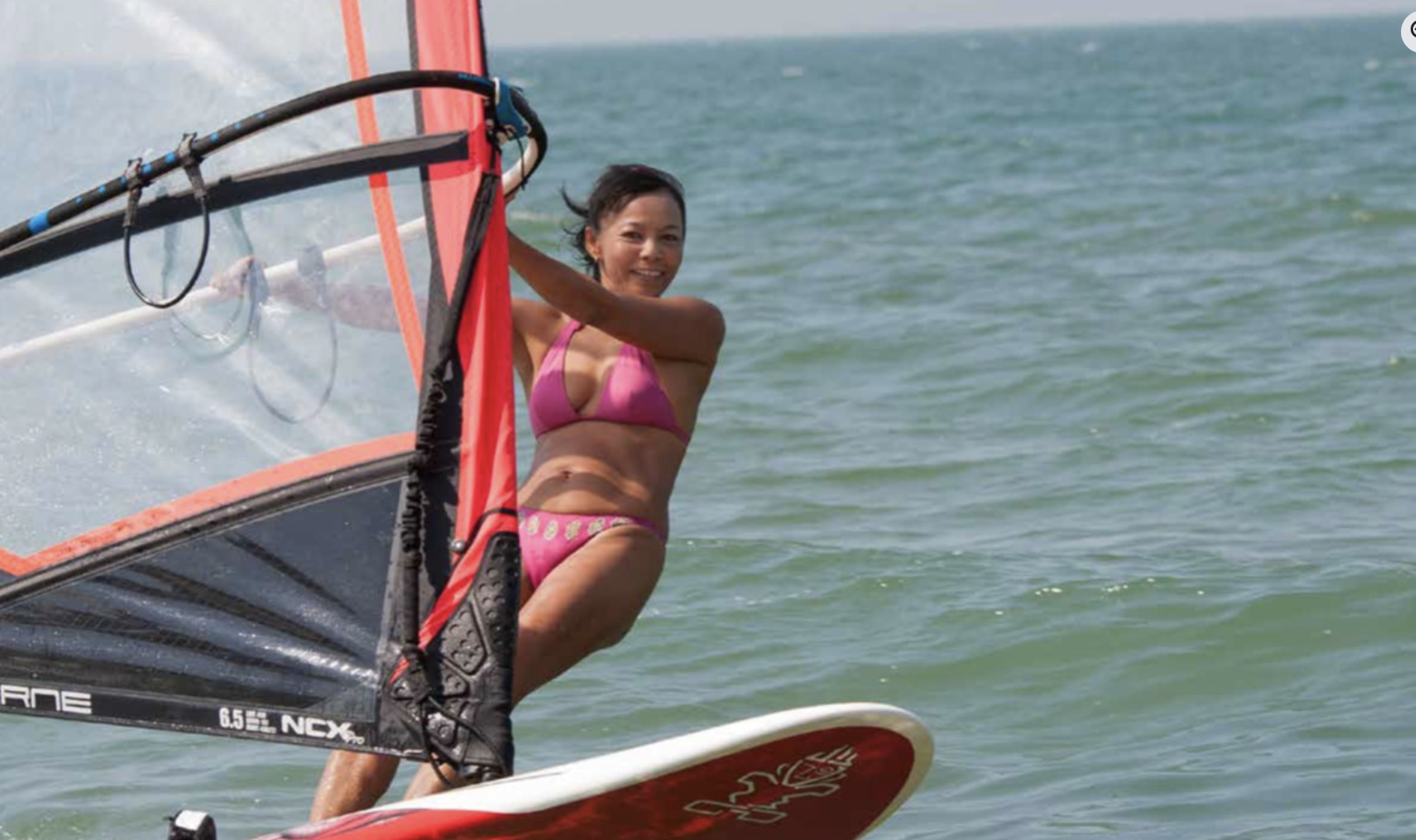
Amara Wichithong in action.

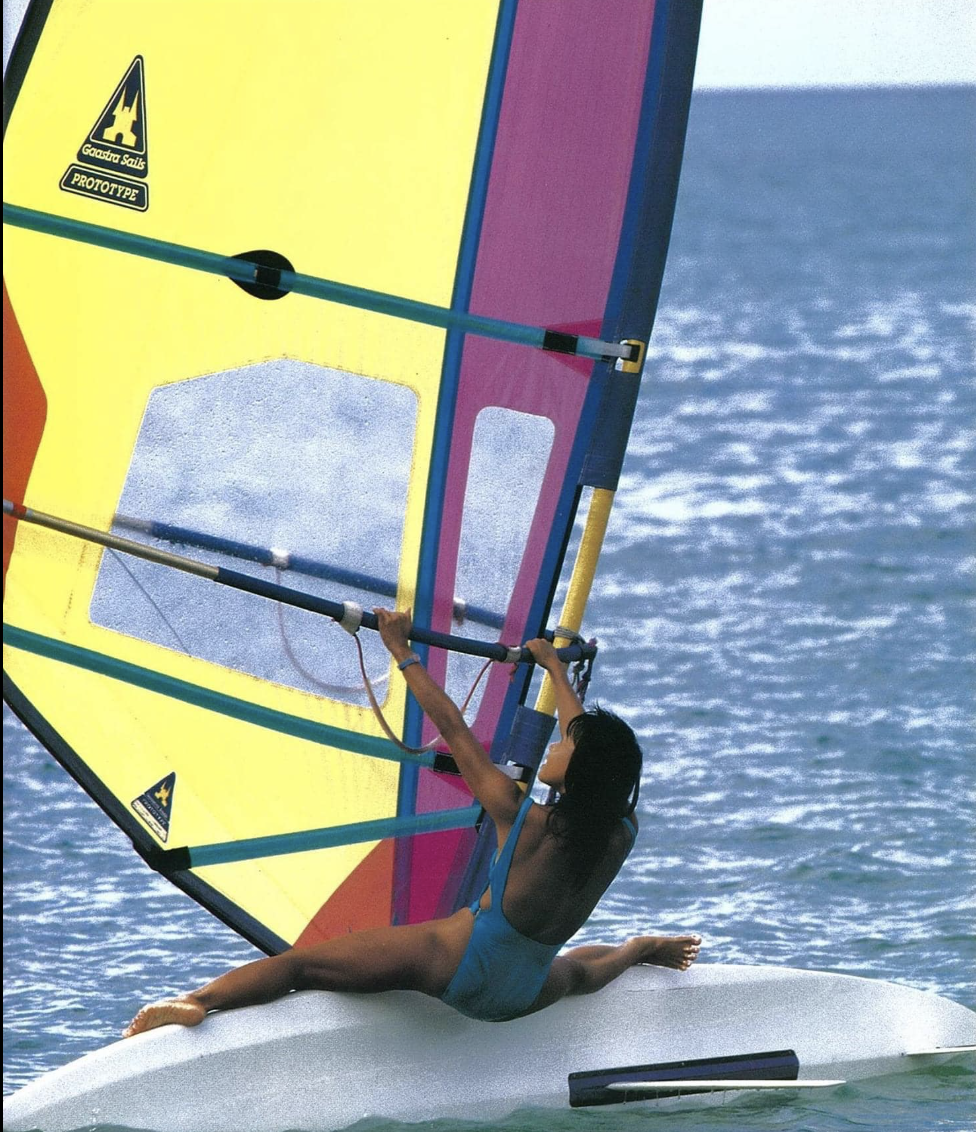
Amara Wichithong in action.

Raised in Ayutthaya, Wichithong had a challenging early life and limited formal schooling. At age 13, she moved alone to Pattaya to support herself and found work by the sea. It was there that she discovered windsurfing and quickly developed an affinity for the sport. Within three months of learning, she entered and won her first local competition.

By age 17, Wichithong had won the international freestyle windsurfing title in Israel. Over the next two decades, she competed across Asia and Europe, winning more than 200 titles in freestyle, slalom, and course racing. She earned medals at multiple Southeast Asian Games and represented Thailand on numerous international stages.

Following her competitive career, she founded Amara Watersports, a watersports training center on Jomtien Beach, which offers windsurfing, wingfoiling, paddleboarding, and sailing instruction. Her school continues to mentor national-level athletes and hosts windsurfing events.

In addition to her contributions to sport, Wichithong is a committed environmental advocate. She leads beach cleanup campaigns, trains youth and women in ocean conservation, and organizes community workshops on plastic upcycling and sustainable tourism. Her initiatives include converting marine plastic waste into usable bricks for local construction and involving students in citizen science activities.

Wichithong's legacy as an athlete, entrepreneur, and environmentalist continues to inspire a new generation of Thai women to pursue excellence in sport and sustainability.

On July 4, 2022, Mr. Varawut Silpa-archa, Minister of Natural Resources and Environment, presented the Royal Honorary Pin Rak Tha-lay Ying Cheep to Ms. Amara Wichithong for her dedication to protecting and restoring marine and coastal resources, and for being a role model and inspiration in environmental protection. Her efforts include public education, outreach, and youth activities to cultivate awareness and foster marine conservation across Thailand.

She is also the winner of the Sports Positive Award 2024 (Asia) for her extensive contribution to combating Thailand's plastic pollution crisis.

== Notable Achievements ==
Notable Achievements
Year	Event	Sport	Position	Medal
1978	Siam Cup (Triangle Race), Thailand	Windsurfing	2nd	Silver
1978	Siam Cup (Ladies Marathon), Thailand	Windsurfing	1st	Gold
1979	International Windsurfing Cup, Thailand	Windsurfing	3rd	Bronze
1980	SSC-See Walchen, Germany	Windsurfing	2nd	Silver
1980	Damen Münchner Surf-Meisterschaft, Germany	Windsurfing	4th	
1980	Freestyle (Ladies), Israel	Windsurfing	1st	Gold
1980	Silvaplana-Regatta, Switzerland	Windsurfing	3rd	Bronze
1980	Asian Tandem Regatta, Thailand	Sailing / Multi-sport	1st	Gold
1980	Boardsailing Marathon Championship, Singapore	Windsurfing	1st	Gold
1980	Coke Cup (Ladies)	Windsurfing	1st	Gold
1981	Thailand Windsurfing Championship, Thailand	Windsurfing	1st	Gold
1981	Thai Windsurfing Association Cup, Thailand	Windsurfing	1st	Gold
1981	Seibu Sports Cup Hi-Wind, Japan	Windsurfing	1st	Gold
1981	Mistral World Championship (Women), Thailand	Windsurfing	4th	
1981	Freestyle Mistral World, Singapore	Windsurfing	7th	
1982	National Windsurf Championship (Ladies), Thailand	Windsurfing	1st	Gold
1982	LSS LL-Bradan, Sweden	Windsurfing	1st	Gold
1982	OWSC, Sweden	Windsurfing	1st	Gold
1982	Singapore Board Sailing Championship, Singapore	Windsurfing	1st	Gold
1983	Singapore Championship (Ladies), Singapore	Windsurfing	1st	Gold
1983	Champion of Chonburi (B.E. 2526), Chon Buri, Thailand	Windsurfing	1st	Gold
1983	Siam Cup (Marathon Ladies), Thailand	Windsurfing	1st	Gold
1984	Pattaya Windsurfing Festival (Ladies), Thailand	Windsurfing	1st	Gold
1984	Around The Islands Race (Ladies), Thailand	Windsurfing	1st	Gold
1984	Marathon Race Championship (Women), Thailand	Windsurfing	1st	Gold
1984	Siam Cup (Marathon Ladies), Thailand	Windsurfing	1st	Gold
1984	National Championship, Thailand	Windsurfing	1st	Gold
1985	Siam Cup Marathon (Ladies)	Windsurfing	1st	Gold
1985	Kent Cup (Ladies), Hongkong	Windsurfing	1st	Gold
1985	Asian Tandem Regatta, Thailand	Tandem Windsurfing	1st	Gold
1986	Asian Tandem Regatta, Thailand	Tandem Windsurfing	8th	
1986	Singapore Open (Triangle Race), Singapore	Windsurfing	1st	Gold
1988	International Asian Windsurfing Championship, Thailand	Windsurfing	1st	Gold
1989	Singapore Open Championship (Ladies Class), Singapore	Windsurfing	1st	Gold
1989	Siam World Cup (Women), Thailand	Windsurfing	1st	Gold
1989	Gulf of Thailand (Lightweight Winner), Thailand	Windsurfing	1st	Gold
1991	International Raceboard Class, Thailand	Windsurfing	1st	Gold
1992	Olympics, Barcelona Spain (Women's Lechner A-390)	Windsurfing	20th	
1994	National Championship, Thailand	Windsurfing	1st	Gold
1994	Mini Marathon Race (Ladies), Thailand	Windsurfing	1st	Gold
1995	Taksim Cup (His Majesty the King Cup), Thailand	Windsurfing	1st	Gold
1998	Sailboard Phuket Cup, Thailand	Windsurfing	1st	Gold
1999	Monsoon Madness (Ladies), Malaysia	Windsurfing	1st	Gold
2005	Ladies Formula Cup, Pattaya, Thailand	Windsurfing	1st	Gold
2005	Master Class (Senior), Pattaya, Thailand	Windsurfing	1st	Gold
2016	SUP Station (3 km Women's Race), Thailand	SUP	2nd	Silver
2018	Singha Windsurfer Class, Thailand	Windsurfing	3rd	Bronze
