= Trevor Strydom =

South African fencer and modern pentathlete

Personal information
- Born: 9 January 1958 (age 68)

Sport
- Sport: Fencing, modern pentathlon

Trevor Strydom (born 9 January 1958) is a South African fencer and modern pentathlete. He competed at the 1992 Summer Olympics.
