= Monica Doti =

Brazilian table tennis player

Personal information
- Born: 12 May 1970 (age 55) São Paulo, Brazil

Sport
- Sport: Table tennis

Monica Doti (born 12 May 1970) is a Brazilian table tennis player. She competed at the 1992 Summer Olympics and the 1996 Summer Olympics.
