= Viktor Zuikov =

Estonian fencer (born 1962)

Personal information
- Born: 10 April 1962 (age 64) Tartu, then part of Estonian SSR, Soviet Union

Sport
- Sport: Fencing
Medal record
Representing Estonia
Men's fencing
European Championships
Bronze medal – third place	1996 Limoges	Épée

Viktor Zuikov (born 10 April 1962) is an Estonian fencer. He competed in the individual épée event at the 1992 Summer Olympics.
