= Norikazu Tanabe =

Japanese fencer

Personal information
- Born: 16 February 1970 (age 56) Shimane, Japan

Sport
- Sport: Fencing

Norikazu Tanabe (田部 仁一, Tanabe Norikazu; born 16 February 1970) is a Japanese fencer. He competed in the individual épée event at the 1992 Summer Olympics.
