= Tan Kim Huat =

Singaporean fencer

Personal information
- Born: 28 January 1959 (age 67)

Chinese name
- Traditional Chinese: 陳金發
- Simplified Chinese: 陈金发
- Hanyu Pinyin: Chén Jīnfā
- Hokkien POJ: Tân Kimhoat

Sport
- Sport: Fencing

Tan Kim Huat (born 28 January 1959) is a Singaporean fencer. He competed in the individual foil and épée events at the 1992 Summer Olympics.

Tan started fencing when he was 14.

In 1987, Tan won the bronze medal in the individual foil at the 1987 Southeast Asian Games. He won three matches and lost two matches against eventual gold and silver medalists, Alkindi and Irawan Dida, both from Indonesia respectively.

In 1989, Tan won the individual foil in the Malaysian Open.

In 1996, Tan won the National Individual Championship and the Singapore Open Championship in both the Foil and Epee events.

He competes the 2023 BWF World Senior Championships at men's doubles in 60+ age event.

== Personal life ==
Tan married his wife, Gina, in May 1987.
