= Carlos da Motta =

Brazilian equestrian

Personal information
- Born: 20 April 1959 (age 65); Rio de Janeiro, Brazil

Sport
- Sport: Equestrian

Carlos da Motta (born 20 April 1959) is a Brazilian equestrian. He competed in two events at the 1992 Summer Olympics.
