= Michael O'Brien (fencer) =

Irish fencer

Personal information
- Nationality: Irish
- Born: 23 December 1969 (age 56)

Sport
- Sport: Fencing
- Team: Ireland

Achievements and titles
- Olympic finals: barcelona 1992

Michael O'Brien (born 23 December 1969) is an Irish fencer. He competed in the individual épée event at the 1992 Summer Olympics.
