= Rui Frazão =

Portuguese fencer

Personal information
- Born: 6 April 1970 (age 56) Lisbon, Portugal

Sport
- Sport: Fencing

Rui Frazão (born 6 April 1970) is a Portuguese fencer. He competed in the individual épée event at the 1992 Summer Olympics.
