= Gavin McLean =

New Zealand fencer

Personal information
- Born: 13 April 1965 (age 61) Neuilly-sur-Seine, France

Sport
- Sport: Fencing

Gavin McLean (born 13 April 1965) is a New Zealand fencer. He competed in the individual épée event at the 1992 Summer Olympics.
