= Wong Liang Hun =

Singaporean fencer (1953–2024)

James Wong
Personal information
- Born: Wong Liang Hun; 8 May 1953 Malacca Town, Malacca, Federation of Malaya
- Died: 7 April 2024 (aged 70)

Chinese name
- Simplified Chinese: 黄良汉
- Traditional Chinese: 黃良漢
- Hanyu Pinyin: Huáng Liánghàn
- Romanization: Vòng Liònghon

Sport
- Sport: Fencing
Medal record
Men's fencing
Representing Singapore
SEA Games
Silver medal – second place	1989 Malaysia	?
Silver medal – second place	1991 Philippines	?
Silver medal – second place	1993 Singapore	?

James Wong (Wong Liang Hun, 黄良汉; 8 May 1953 – 7 April 2024) was a Singaporean fencer. He competed in the individual foil and épée events at the 1992 Summer Olympics.

Wong first came to Singapore to join the Republic of Singapore Air Force. He won silver medals at the 1989, 1991, and 1993 Southeast Asian Games. After his retirement, he became a vice-president of the Singapore Fencing Association and a coach for the national team. He also co-founded Z Fencing, a chain of fencing schools.

Wong died of cancer on 7 April 2024, at the age of 70.
