= Lisa Gullberg =

Swedish windsurfer

Personal information
- Nationality: Swedish
- Born: Eva Lisa Gullberg; 16 April 1970 (age 55) Västerås, Sweden
- Height: 164 cm (5 ft 5 in)
- Weight: 53 kg (117 lb)

Sport
- Sport: Windsurfing

Eva Lisa Gullberg (born 16 April 1970) is a Swedish windsurfer. She competed in the women's Lechner A-390 event at the 1992 Summer Olympics.
