= Marek Stępień =

Polish fencer

Personal information
- Born: 1 June 1964 (age 62) Kraśnik, Poland

Sport
- Sport: Fencing

Marek Stępień (born 1 June 1964) is a Polish fencer. He competed in the team épée event at the 1992 Summer Olympics.
