= Olivier Jacquet =

Swiss fencer

Personal information
- Born: 27 June 1969 (age 57)

Sport
- Sport: Fencing

Olivier Jacquet (born 27 June 1969) is a Swiss fencer. He competed in the individual épée events at the 1992 and 1996 Summer Olympics.
