= Mats Ahlgren =

Swedish fencer

Personal information
- Born: 19 June 1967 (age 59) Malmö, Sweden

Sport
- Sport: Fencing

Mats Lennart Ahlgren (born 19 June 1967) is a Swedish fencer. He competed in the team épée events at the 1992 Summer Olympics.
