= Francisco Papaiano =

Brazilian fencer

Personal information
- Born: 12 April 1971 (age 55)

Sport
- Sport: Fencing

Francisco Papaiano (born 12 April 1971) is a Brazilian fencer. He competed in the individual épée event at the 1992 Summer Olympics.
