= Chang Tae-suk =

South Korean fencer

Personal information
- Born: 22 September 1968 (age 57)

Sport
- Sport: Fencing

- Chang Tae-suk
- Hangul: 장태석
- Hanja: 張泰錫
- RR: Jang Taeseok
- MR: Chang T'aesŏk

Chang Tae-suk (Korean: 장태석; born 22 September 1968) is a South Korean fencer. He competed in the individual and team épée events at the 1992 and 1996 Summer Olympics.
