= Danek Nowosielski =

Canadian fencer (born 1966)

Personal information
- Born: 16 November 1966 (age 59) Montreal, Quebec, Canada

Sport
- Sport: Fencing
Medal record
Representing Canada
Pan American Games
| Silver medal – second place | 1987 Indianapolis | Team foil |
| Bronze medal – third place | 1987 Indianapolis | Team sabre |
| Bronze medal – third place | 1991 Havana | Individual épée |
| Bronze medal – third place | 1991 Havana | Team foil |
Summer Universiade
| Silver medal – second place | 1987 Zagreb | Team épée |

Danek Nowosielski (born 16 November 1966) is a Canadian fencer. He competed at the 1988, 1992 and 1996 Summer Olympics. He was inducted into the Lisgar Collegiate Institute Athletic Wall of Fame in 2009.

== See also ==
- List of Princeton University Olympians
