= Gabriel Pantelimon =

Romanian fencer

Personal information
- Born: 30 November 1968 (age 57)

Sport
- Sport: Fencing

Gabriel Pantelimon (born 30 November 1968) is a Romanian fencer. He competed in the individual and team épée events at the 1992 and 1996 Summer Olympics.
