= Kim Jung-kwan (fencer) =

South Korean fencer

Personal information
- Born: 1 March 1970 (age 56)

Korean name
- Hangul: 김정관
- Hanja: 金正關
- RR: Gim Jeonggwan
- MR: Kim Chŏnggwan

Sport
- Sport: Fencing

Kim Jung-kwan (born 1 March 1970) is a South Korean fencer. He competed in the individual and team épée events at the 1992 Summer Olympics.
