= Jean-Marc Chouinard =

Canadian fencer (born 1963)

Personal information
- Born: 6 November 1963 (age 62) Montreal, Quebec, Canada

Sport
- Sport: Fencing

Jean-Marc Chouinard (born 6 November 1963) is a Canadian fencer. He competed in the individual and team épée events at four consecutive Olympic Games from 1984 to 1996.
