= Serhiy Kravchuk =

Soviet fencer (born 1964)

Personal information
- Born: 3 June 1964 (age 62) Kyiv, Ukrainian SSR, Soviet Union

Sport
- Sport: Fencing
Medal record
Men's fencing
Representing Unified Team
Olympic Games
Bronze medal – third place	1992 Barcelona	Épée, team

Serhiy Kravchuk (Ukrainian: Сергій Кравчук; born 3 June 1964) is a Soviet fencer. He won a bronze medal in the team épée event at the 1992 Summer Olympics.
