= Nicolae Mihăilescu =

Romanian fencer

Personal information
- Born: 28 November 1965 (age 60)

Sport
- Sport: Fencing

Nicolae Mihăilescu (born 28 November 1965) is a Romanian former fencer. He competed in the team épée event at the 1992 Summer Olympics.
