= Ulf Sandegren =

Swedish fencer

Personal information
- Born: 21 February 1964 (age 62) Stockholm, Sweden

Sport
- Sport: Fencing

Ulf Johan Owe Sandegren (born 21 February 1964) is a Swedish fencer. He competed in the épée events at the 1988 and 1992 Summer Olympics, both times finishing 8th in the team épée, and 46th in the individual épée at the 1992 Olympics.

Sandgren represented Djurgårdens IF. He won the 1985 and 1990 Swedish championships in individual épée and four team épée Swedish championships for Djurgårdens IF.
