= Luciano Finardi =

Brazilian fencer

Personal information
- Born: 15 January 1966 (age 60)

Sport
- Sport: Fencing

Luciano Finardi (born 15 January 1966) is a Brazilian fencer. He competed in the individual épée event at the 1992 Summer Olympics.
