= Daniel Lang (fencer) =

Swiss fencer

Personal information
- Born: 8 August 1971 (age 54)

Sport
- Sport: Fencing

Daniel Lang (born 8 August 1971) is a Swiss fencer. He competed in the individual épée event at the 1992 Summer Olympics.
