= Sławomir Nawrocki =

Polish fencer

Personal information
- Born: 16 September 1969 (age 56) Zielona Góra, Poland

Sport
- Sport: Fencing

Sławomir Nawrocki (born 16 September 1969) is a Polish fencer. He competed in the individual and team épée events at the 1992 Summer Olympics.
