= Scott Arnold (fencer) =

Australian fencer

Personal information
- Born: 13 March 1965 (age 61) Melbourne, Australia

Sport
- Sport: Fencing

Scott Arnold (born 13 March 1965) is an Australian fencer. He competed in the individual épée event at the 1992 Summer Olympics.
