= Roman Ječmínek =

Czech fencer

Personal information
- Born: 12 May 1967 (age 59) Prague, Czechoslovakia

Sport
- Sport: Fencing

Roman Ječmínek (born 12 May 1967) is a Czech fencer. He competed in the épée events at the 1992 and 1996 Summer Olympics.
