= Jiří Douba =

Czech fencer

Personal information
- Born: 23 May 1958 (age 68) Karlovy Vary, Czechoslovakia

Sport
- Sport: Fencing

Jiří Douba (born 23 May 1958) is a Czech fencer. He competed in the individual and team épée events at the 1980 and 1992 Summer Olympics. In individual épée competitions, he achieved rankings of 31st in 1980 and 21st in 1992.
