= Thomas Lundblad =

Swedish fencer

Personal information
- Born: 13 May 1967 (age 59) Uppsala, Sweden

Sport
- Sport: Fencing

Thomas Lundblad (born 13 May 1967) is a Swedish fencer. He competed in the individual and team épée events at the 1992 Summer Olympics.
