= Aleš Depta =

Czech fencer

Personal information
- Born: 28 October 1964 (age 61) Ostrava, Czechoslovakia

Sport
- Country: Czechoslovakia
- Sport: Fencing
- Event: Épée

Aleš Depta (born 28 October 1964) is a Czech fencer. He competed for Czechoslovakia in the individual and team épée events at the 1992 Summer Olympics.
