= Roberto Lazzarini =

Brazilian fencer

Personal information
- Born: 19 August 1961 (age 64)

Sport
- Sport: Fencing

Roberto Lazzarini (born 19 August 1961) is a Brazilian épée and foil fencer. He competed at the 1988 and 1992 Summer Olympics.
