= Laurie Shong =

Canadian fencer and modern pentathlete

Personal information
- Born: 2 January 1971 (age 55) Vancouver, British Columbia, Canada

Sport
- Sport: Fencing, modern pentathlon
Medal record
Representing Canada
Pan American Games
Bronze medal – third place	1999 Winnipeg	Individual épée

Laurie Shong (born 2 January 1971) is a Canadian fencer and modern pentathlete. He competed in the modern pentathlon at the 1992 Summer Olympics and the épée fencing events at the 1992 and 2000 Summer Olympics.

He is married to Hungarian fencer Aida Mohamed.
