= Cornel Milan =

Romanian fencer and coach

Personal information
- Full name: Cornel Răzvan Milan
- Born: 8 September 1971 (age 54) Bucharest, Romania
- Home town: Bucharest, Romania

Fencing career
- Sport: Fencing
- Country: Romania
- Weapon: épée
- Club: CSA Steaua București

Cornel Răzvan Milan (born 8 September 1971) is a Romanian fencer and fencing coach.

In 1991, he won the bronze medal at the Junior World Fencing Championships in Istanbul. He competed in the individual and team épée events at the 1992 Summer Olympics.

After his retirement as a fencer he graduated from the National Academy for Physical Education and Sports in Bucharest and became a coach at CSA Steaua București, where he trained amongst others world champions Ana Maria Brânză and Anca Măroiu. With Dan Podeanu and George Epurescu he also coaches the women's épée national team.
