= Raúl Maroto =

Spanish fencer

Raúl Lorenzo Maroto López
Personal information
- Born: 5 September 1965 (age 60) Madrid, Spain

Sport
- Sport: Fencing

Raúl Maroto (born 5 September 1965) is a Spanish fencer. He competed in the épée events at the 1988, 1992 and 1996 Summer Olympics.
