= Maciej Ciszewski =

Polish fencer

Personal information
- Born: 21 December 1971 (age 54) Wrocław, Poland

Sport
- Sport: Fencing

Maciej Ciszewski (born 21 December 1971) is a Polish fencer. He competed in the individual and team épée events at the 1992 Summer Olympics.
