= Péter Vánky =

Swedish fencer

Personal information
- Born: 28 June 1968 (age 58) Târgu Mureș, Romania

Sport
- Sport: Fencing

Péter István Vánky (born 28 June 1968) is a Romanian-born Swedish fencer. He competed in the épée events at the 1988, 1992, 1996 and 2000 Summer Olympics.

Vánky represented Djurgårdens IF. He won the 1988 Swedish championship in individual épée and 12 Swedish championships in team épée.
