= Germany at the 1992 Summer Olympics =

- IOC code: GER
- NOC: National Olympic Committee for Germany

in Barcelona, Spain 25 July–9 August 1992
- Competitors: 463 (300 men, 163 women) in 26 sports
- Flag bearer: Manfred Klein
- Medals Ranked 3rd: Gold 33 Silver 21 Bronze 28 Total 82

Summer Olympics appearances (overview)
- 1896; 1900; 1904; 1908; 1912; 1920–1924; 1928; 1932; 1936; 1948; 1952; 1956–1988; 1992; 1996; 2000; 2004; 2008; 2012; 2016; 2020; 2024; 2028

Other related appearances
- 1906 Intercalated Games –––– Saar (1952); United Team of Germany (1956–1964); East Germany (1968–1988); West Germany (1968–1988)

Germany competed at the 1992 Summer Olympics in Barcelona, Spain. It was the first time the European nation participated in the Summer Games after German reunification in 1990 and for the first time as a single nation since 1936. Previously, West Germany and East Germany had sent independent teams to the Games. 463 German competitors, 300 men and 163 women, took part in 237 events in 26 sports.

== Medalists ==
Medal	Name	Sport	Event	Date
Gold	Bernd Dittert; Christian Meyer; Uwe Peschel; Michael Rich	Cycling	Men's team time trial	26 July
Gold	Dagmar Hase	Swimming	Women's 400 metre freestyle	28 July
Gold	Ralf Schumann	Shooting	Men's 25 metre rapid fire pistol	30 July
Gold	Maik Bullmann	Wrestling	Men's Greco-Roman 90 kg	30 July
Gold	Guido Fulst; Michael Glöckner; Jens Lehmann; Stefan Steinweg; Andreas Walzer	Cycling	Men's team pursuit	31 July
Gold	Jens Fiedler	Cycling	Men's sprint	31 July
Gold	Petra Rossner	Cycling	Women's individual pursuit	31 July
Gold	Silke Renk	Athletics	Women's javelin throw	1 August
Gold	Elisabeth Micheler-Jones	Canoeing	Women's slalom K-1	1 August
Gold	Thomas Lange	Rowing	Men's single sculls	1 August
Gold	Kerstin Müller; Kristina Mundt; Birgit Peter; Sybille Schmidt	Rowing	Women's quadruple sculls	1 August
Gold	Michael Jakosits	Shooting	Men's 10 metre running target	1 August
Gold	Kathrin Boron; Kerstin Köppen	Rowing	Women's double sculls	1 August
Gold	Klaus Balkenhol; Monica Theodorescu; Nicole Uphoff; Isabell Werth	Equestrian	Team dressage	2 August
Gold	Andreas Hajek; Michael Steinbach; Stephan Volkert; André Willms	Rowing	Men's quadruple sculls	2 August
Gold	Ronny Weller	Weightlifting	Men's 110 kg	3 August
Gold	Nicole Uphoff	Equestrian	Individual dressage	5 August
Gold	Alexander Koch; Ulrich Schreck; Udo Wagner; Thorsten Weidner; Ingo Weißenborn	Fencing	Men's team foil	5 August
Gold	Elmar Borrmann; Robert Felisiak; Uwe Proske; Wladimir Resnitschenko; Arnd Schmitt	Fencing	Men's team épée	6 August
Gold	Heike Drechsler	Athletics	Women's long jump	7 August
Gold	Kay Bluhm; Torsten Gutsche	Canoeing	Men's K-2 500 metres	7 August
Gold	Ramona Portwich; Anke von Seck	Canoeing	Women's K-2 500 metres	7 August
Gold	Birgit Schmidt	Canoeing	Women's K-1 500 metres	7 August
Gold	Boris Becker; Michael Stich	Tennis	Men's doubles	7 August
Gold	Kay Bluhm; Torsten Gutsche	Canoeing	Men's K-2 1000 metres	8 August
Gold	Ulrich Papke; Ingo Spelly	Canoeing	Men's C-2 1000 metres	8 August
Gold	Dieter Baumann	Athletics	Men's 5000 metres	8 August
Gold	Heike Henkel	Athletics	Women's high jump	8 August
Gold	Mario Von Appen; Oliver Kegel; Thomas Reineck; André Wohllebe	Canoeing	Men's K-4 1000 metres	8 August
Gold	Germany men's national field hockey team: Andreas Becker; Christian Blunck; Carsten Fischer; Volker Fried; Michael Hilgers; Andreas Keller; Michael Knauth; Oliver Kurtz; Christian Mayerhöfer; Sven Meinhardt; Michael Metz; Klaus Michler; Christopher Reitz; Stefan Saliger; Jan-Peter Tewes; Stefan Tewes	Field hockey	Men's tournament	8 August
Gold	Andreas Tews	Boxing	Featherweight	9 August
Gold	Torsten May	Boxing	Light heavyweight	9 August
Gold	Ludger Beerbaum	Equestrian	Individual jumping	9 August
Silver	Franziska van Almsick	Swimming	Women's 200 metre freestyle	27 July
Silver	Jens Lehmann	Cycling	Men's individual pursuit	29 July
Silver	Herbert Blöcker	Equestrian	Individual eventing	30 July
Silver	Franziska van Almsick; Daniela Brendel; Jana Dörries; Dagmar Hase; Daniela Hunger; Simone Osygus; Bettina Ustrowski	Swimming	Women's 4 × 100 metre medley relay	30 July
Silver	Rıfat Yıldız	Wrestling	Men's Greco-Roman 57 kg	30 July
Silver	Annett Neumann	Cycling	Women's sprint	31 July
Silver	Dagmar Hase	Swimming	Women's 200 metre backstroke	31 July
Silver	Colin von Ettingshausen; Peter Hoeltzenbein	Rowing	Men's coxless pair	1 August
Silver	Ingeburg Schwerzmann; Stefani Werremeier	Rowing	Women's coxless pair	1 August
Silver	Ralf Brudel; Karsten Finger; Uwe Kellner; Thoralf Peters; Hendrik Reiher	Rowing	Men's coxed four	1 August
Silver	Andreas Wecker	Gymnastics	Men's horizontal bar	2 August
Silver	Sabine Bau; Annette Dobmeier; Zita-Eva Funkenhauser; Anja Fichtel; Monika Weber-Koszto	Fencing	Women's team foil	4 August
Silver	Steffen Fetzner; Jörg Roßkopf	Table tennis	Men's doubles	4 August
Silver	Jürgen Schult	Athletics	Men's discus throw	5 August
Silver	Isabell Werth	Equestrian	Individual dressage	5 August
Silver	Heiko Balz	Wrestling	Men's freestyle 100 kg	5 August
Silver	Ulrich Papke; Ingo Spelly	Canoeing	Men's C-2 500 metres	7 August
Silver	Germany women's national field hockey team: Britta Becker; Tanja Dickenscheid; Nadine Ernsting-Krienke; Christine Ferneck; Eva Hagenbäumer; Franziska Hentschel; Caren Jungjohann; Katrin Kauschke; Irina Kuhnt; Heike Lätzsch; Susanne Müller; Tina Peters; Simone Thomaschinski; Bianca Weiß; Anke Wild; Susie Wollschläger	Field hockey	Women's tournament	7 August
Silver	Steffi Graf	Tennis	Women's singles	7 August
Silver	Katrin Borchert; Ramona Portwich; Birgit Schmidt; Anke von Seck	Canoeing	Women's K-4 500 metres	8 August
Silver	Marco Rudolph	Boxing	Lightweight	8 August
Bronze	Franziska van Almsick	Swimming	Women's 100 metre freestyle	26 July
Bronze	Johann Riederer	Shooting	Men's 10 metre air rifle	27 July
Bronze	Kerstin Kielgass	Swimming	Women's 200 metre freestyle	27 July
Bronze	Franziska van Almsick; Annette Hadding; Daniela Hunger; Kerstin Kielgass; Simone Osygus; Manuela Stellmach	Swimming	Women's 4 × 100 metre freestyle relay	28 July
Bronze	Mark Pinger; Dirk Richter; Andreas Szigat; Christian Tröger; Steffen Zesner; Bengt Zikarsky	Swimming	Men's 4 × 100 metre freestyle relay	29 July
Bronze	Andreas Behm	Weightlifting	Men's 67.5 kg	29 July
Bronze	Matthias Baumann; Herbert Blöcker; Ralf Ehrenbrink; Cord Mysegaes	Equestrian	Team eventing	30 July
Bronze	Jana Henke	Swimming	Women's 800 metre freestyle	30 July
Bronze	Daniela Hunger	Swimming	Women's 200 metre individual medley	31 July
Bronze	Jörg Hoffmann	Swimming	Men's 1500 metre freestyle	31 July
Bronze	Karen Forkel	Athletics	Women's javelin throw	1 August
Bronze	Udo Quellmalz	Judo	Men's 65 kg	1 August
Bronze	Antje Frank; Annette Hohn; Gabriele Mehl; Birte Siech	Rowing	Women's coxless four	1 August
Bronze	Sabine Braun	Athletics	Women's heptathlon	2 August
Bronze	Jochen Lettmann	Canoeing	Men's slalom K-1	2 August
Bronze	Brita Baldus	Diving	Women's 3 metre springboard	2 August
Bronze	Andreas Wecker	Gymnastics	Men's pommel horse	2 August
Bronze	Andreas Wecker	Gymnastics	Men's rings	2 August
Bronze	Richard Trautmann	Judo	Men's 60 kg	2 August
Bronze	Roland Baar; Armin Eichholz; Detlef Kirchhoff; Manfred Klein; Bahne Rabe; Frank Richter; Hans Sennewald; Thorsten Streppelhoff; Ansgar Wessling	Rowing	Men's eight	2 August
Bronze	Sylvia Dördelmann; Kathrin Haacker; Christiane Harzendorf; Daniela Neunast; Cerstin Petersmann; Dana Pyritz; Annegret Strauch; Ute Schell; Judith Zeidler	Rowing	Women's eight	2 August
Bronze	Manfred Nerlinger	Weightlifting	Men's +110 kg	4 August
Bronze	Kathrin Neimke	Athletics	Women's shot put	5 August
Bronze	Klaus Balkenhol	Equestrian	Individual dressage	5 August
Bronze	Jan Quast	Boxing	Light flyweight	6 August
Bronze	Ronald Weigel	Athletics	Men's 50 kilometres walk	7 August
Bronze	Olaf Heukrodt	Canoeing	Men's C-1 500 metres	7 August
Bronze	Stephan Freigang	Athletics	Men's marathon	9 August

== Competitors ==
The following is the list of number of competitors in the Games.

Sport	Men	Women	Total
Archery	3	3	6
Athletics	39	40	79
Badminton	2	2	4
Basketball	12	0	12
Boxing	12	–	12
Canoeing	22	7	29
Cycling	13	4	17
Diving	3	4	7
Equestrian	9	3	12
Fencing	15	5	20
Field hockey	16	16	32
Gymnastics	6	7	13
Handball	16	16	32
Judo	7	6	13
Modern pentathlon	3	–	3
Rowing	31	22	53
Sailing	13	2	15
Shooting	14	4	18
Swimming	20	14	34
Synchronized swimming	-	2	2
Table tennis	2	3	5
Tennis	3	3	6
Water polo	12	–	12
Weightlifting	10	–	10
Wrestling	17	–	17
Total	300	163	463

== Archery ==
In Germany's fifth archery competition, only one of the six archers qualified for the individual elimination rounds. He lost his first match, as did both the men's and women's teams.

Men

Athlete	Event	Ranking round		Round of 32	Round of 16	Quarterfinals	Semifinals	Final / BM	
Athlete	Event	Score	Seed	Opposition Score	Opposition Score	Opposition Score	Opposition Score	Opposition Score	Rank
Andreas Lippoldt	Individual	1256	43	Did not advance					
Frank Marzoch	Individual	1283	26 Q	Grov (NOR); L 94–106	Did not advance				
Marc Rösicke	Individual	1260	38	Did not advance					
Andreas Lippoldt; Frank Marzoch; Marc Rösicke	Team	3799	11 Q	—N/a	Great Britain; L 231–233	Did not advance			

Women

Athlete	Event	Ranking round		Round of 32	Round of 16	Quarterfinals	Semifinals	Final / BM	
Athlete	Event	Score	Seed	Opposition Score	Opposition Score	Opposition Score	Opposition Score	Opposition Score	Rank
Astrid Hänschen	Individual	1245	43	Did not advance					
Cornelia Pfohl	Individual	1239	44	Did not advance					
Marion Wagner	Individual	1207	53	Did not advance					
Astrid Hänschen; Cornelia Pfohl; Marion Wagner	Team	3691	15 Q	—N/a	Unified Team; L 234–242	Did not advance			

== Athletics ==
Men
Track and road events

Athlete	Event	Heats		Quarterfinal		Semifinal		Final	
Athlete	Event	Result	Rank	Result	Rank	Result	Rank	Result	Rank
Rico Lieder	400 metres	45.86	15 Q	45.86	20	Did not advance			
Thomas Schönlebe	400 metres	46.26	28 Q	45.46	17	Did not advance			
Jörg Haas	800 metres	1:50.42	36	—N/a		Did not advance			
Hauke Fuhlbrügge	1500 metres	3:38.92	19 q	—N/a		3:38.45	16	Did not advance	
Jens-Peter Herold	1500 metres	3:36.76	3 Q	—N/a		3:39.55	12 Q	3:41.53	6
Rüdiger Stenzel	1500 metres	3:44.70	24 Q	—N/a		3:40.23	19	Did not advance	
Dieter Baumann	5000 metres	13:20.82	1 Q	—N/a				13:12.52	1st place, gold medalist(s)
Carsten Eich	10,000 metres	29:22.19	34	—N/a				Did not advance	
Stéphane Franke	10,000 metres	28:52.83	26	—N/a				Did not advance	
Konrad Dobler	Marathon	—N/a						2:23:44	49
Stephan Freigang	Marathon	—N/a						2:14:00	3rd place, bronze medalist(s)
Dietmar Koszewski	110 metres hurdles	13.64	13 q	13.78	16 q	14.06	14	Did not advance	
Florian Schwarthoff	110 metres hurdles	13.61	10 Q	13.31	3 Q	13.23	4 Q	13.29	5
Olaf Hense	400 metres hurdles	49.97	16 Q	—N/a		DNS		Did not advance	
Carsten Köhrbrück	400 metres hurdles	49.37	12 Q	—N/a		49.41	11	Did not advance	
Steffen Brand	3000 metres steeplechase	8:30.03	16 Q	—N/a		8:26.12	7 Q	8:16.60	5
Hagen Melzer	3000 metres steeplechase	8:31.89	19 q	—N/a		8:38.07	20	Did not advance	
Ralph Pfersich; Rico Lieder; Jörg Vaihinger; Thomas Schönlebe	4 × 400 metres relay	DNF		—N/a				Did not advance	
Robert Ihly	20 kilometres walk	—N/a						1:26:56	11
Axel Noack	20 kilometres walk	—N/a						1:29:55	20
Hartwig Gauder	50 kilometres walk	—N/a						3:56:47	6
Ronald Weigel	50 kilometres walk	—N/a						3:53:45	3rd place, bronze medalist(s)

Field events

Athlete	Event	Qualification		Final	
Athlete	Event	Distance	Position	Distance	Position
Hendrik Beyer	High jump	2.20	25	Did not advance	
Dietmar Mögenburg	High jump	2.15	27	Did not advance	
Ralf Sonn	High jump	2.26	7 q	2.31	6
Dietmar Haaf	Long jump	7.85	14	Did not advance	
Konstantin Krause	Long jump	7.54	32	Did not advance	
Ralf Jaros	Triple jump	16.89	13	Did not advance	
Udo Beyer	Shot put	18.47	19	Did not advance	
Ulf Timmermann	Shot put	19.93	9 Q	20.49	5
Lars Riedel	Discus throw	59.98	14	Did not advance	
Jürgen Schult	Discus throw	63.46	2 Q	64.94	2nd place, silver medalist(s)
Claus Dethloff	Hammer throw	73.64	14	Did not advance	
Heinz Weis	Hammer throw	74.86	11 q	76.90	6
Volker Hadwich	Javelin throw	81.10	3 Q	75.28	12

Combined events – Decathlon

Athlete	Event	100 m	LJ	SP	HJ	400 m	110H	DT	PV	JT	1500 m	Final	Rank
Thorsten Dauth	Result	10.80	7.30	15.29	1.97	48.33	14.76	44.70	4.50	52.94	4:44.91	7951	17
Thorsten Dauth	Points	906	886	808	776	893	879	761	760	632	650	7951	17
Paul Meier	Result	10.75	7.54	15.34	2.15	48.33	15.22	42.14	4.60	55.44	4:38.21	8192	6
Paul Meier	Points	917	945	811	944	893	823	708	790	669	692	8192	6
Frank Müller	Result	10.95	7.25	13.55	1.97	47.98	14.51	42.56	4.60	61.84	4:29.19	8066	13
Frank Müller	Points	872	874	701	776	910	910	717	790	766	750	8066	13

Women
Track and road events

Athlete	Event	Heats		Quarterfinal		Semifinal		Final	
Athlete	Event	Result	Rank	Result	Rank	Result	Rank	Result	Rank
Andrea Philipp	100 metres	11.73	31 Q	11.67	24	Did not advance			
Sabine Günther	200 metres	23.41	19 Q	23.10	20	Did not advance			
Silke Knoll	200 metres	22.83	5 Q	22.46	9 Q	22.60	9	Did not advance	
Andrea Thomas	200 metres	23.52	23 q	23.19	21	Did not advance			
Anja Rücker	400 metres	52.24	6 Q	52.05	18	Did not advance			
Sigrun Grau	800 metres	2:00.31	10 Q	—N/a		2:00.91	11	Did not advance	
Christine Wachtel	800 metres	2:01.39	18	—N/a		Did not advance			
Sabine Zwiener	800 metres	2:00.87	16 q	—N/a		2:02.64	13	Did not advance	
Ellen Kießling	1500 metres	DNF		—N/a		Did not advance			
Uta Pippig	10,000 metres	32:07.28	6 Q	—N/a				31:36.45	7
Kerstin Preßler	10,000 metres	33:17.88	27	—N/a				Did not advance	
Kathrin Ullrich	10,000 metres	DNF		—N/a				Did not advance	
Katrin Dörre	Marathon	—N/a						2:36:48	5
Birgit Jerschabek	Marathon	—N/a						2:42:45	15
Caren Jung	100 metres hurdles	DQ		Did not advance					
Kristin Patzwahl	100 metres hurdles	13.11	9 Q	13.16	10 q	13.44	16	Did not advance	
Gabi Roth	100 metres hurdles	13.12	11 Q	13.28	16 q	13.22	10	Did not advance	
Heike Meißner	400 metres hurdles	55.62	10 Q	—N/a		55.35	12	Did not advance	
Silvia Rieger	400 metres hurdles	56.61	17	—N/a		Did not advance			
Andrea Philipp; Silke Knoll; Andrea Thomas; Sabine Günther	4 × 100 metres relay	43.32	6 Q	—N/a				43.12	5
Uta Rohländer; Heike Meißner; Linda Kisabaka; Anja Rücker	4 × 400 metres relay	3:26.25	7 Q	—N/a				3:26.37	6
Beate Anders	10 kilometres walk	—N/a						46:31	16
Kathrin Born	10 kilometres walk	—N/a						50:21	33

Field events

Athlete	Event	Qualification		Final	
Athlete	Event	Distance	Position	Distance	Position
Marion Goldkamp	High jump	1.86	28	Did not advance	
Heike Henkel	High jump	1.92	1 Q	2.02	1st place, gold medalist(s)
Birgit Kähler	High jump	1.92	6 Q	1.88	11
Heike Drechsler	Long jump	7.08	1 Q	7.14	1st place, gold medalist(s)
Helga Radtke	Long jump	6.42	19	Did not advance	
Susen Tiedtke	Long jump	6.74	6 q	6.60	8
Kathrin Neimke	Shot put	19.13	4 Q	19.78	3rd place, bronze medalist(s)
Stephanie Storp	Shot put	18.58	8 Q	19.10	7
Franka Dietzsch	Discus throw	63.60	8 Q	60.24	12
Martina Hellmann	Discus throw	60.52	14	Did not advance	
Ilke Wyludda	Discus throw	64.26	5 Q	62.16	9
Karen Forkel	Javelin throw	65.44	3 Q	66.86	3rd place, bronze medalist(s)
Petra Meier-Felke	Javelin throw	60.58	9 q	59.02	7
Silke Renk	Javelin throw	65.38	4 Q	68.34	1st place, gold medalist(s)

Combined event – Heptathlon

Athlete	Event	100H	HJ	SP	200 m	LJ	JT	800 m	Total	Rank
Peggy Beer	Result	13.48	1.82	13.23	23.93	6.01	48.10	2:09.49	6434	6
Peggy Beer	Points	1053	1003	743	987	853	823	972	6434	6
Sabine Braun	Result	13.25	1.94	14.23	24.27	6.02	51.12	2:14.35	6649	3rd place, bronze medalist(s)
Sabine Braun	Points	1087	1158	809	955	856	882	902	6649	3rd place, bronze medalist(s)
Birgit Clarius	Result	14.10	1.82	15.33	24.86	6.13	45.14	2:08.83	6388	7
Birgit Clarius	Points	964	1003	883	900	890	766	982	6388	7

== Badminton ==
Men

Athlete	Event	Round of 64	Round of 32	Round of 16	Quarterfinals	Semifinals	Final	
Athlete	Event	Opposition Result	Opposition Result	Opposition Result	Opposition Result	Opposition Result	Opposition Result	Rank
Stephan Kuhl	Singles	Koch (AUT); L 14–17, 15–12, 2–15	Did not advance					
Stefan Frey; Stephan Kuhl	Doubles	—N/a	Ponting / Wright (GBR); L 7–15, 9–15	Did not advance				

Women

Athlete	Event	Round of 64	Round of 32	Round of 16	Quarterfinals	Semifinals	Final	
Athlete	Event	Opposition Result	Opposition Result	Opposition Result	Opposition Result	Opposition Result	Opposition Result	Rank
Katrin Schmidt	Singles	Koleva (BUL); W 11–6, 11–1	Piché (CAN); L 5–11, 8–11	Did not advance				
Kerstin Ubben	Singles	Mizui (JPN); L 4–11, 1–11	Did not advance					
Katrin Schmidt; Kerstin Ubben	Doubles	—N/a	Dakó / Fórián (HUN); W 15–4, 15–6	Bradbury / Clark (GBR); L 14–18, 5–15	Did not advance			

== Basketball ==
Summary

Key:

- OT – Overtime.

Team	Event	Group stage						Quarterfinal	Semi-final	Final / BM	
Team	Event	Opposition Score	Opposition Score	Opposition Score	Opposition Score	Opposition Score	Rank	Opposition Score	Opposition Score	Opposition Score	Rank
Germany men's	Men's tournament	Spain; W 83–74	Angola; W 64–63	United States; L 68–111	Croatia; L 78–99	Brazil; L 76–85	4 Q	Unified Team; L 76–83	Australia; L 79–109	Puerto Rico; W 96–86	7

=== Men's tournament ===
Team roster

Germany men's national basketball team roster
Players
Coaches

Pos.	No.	Name	Age – Date of birth	Height	Club	Ctr.
C	4	Gunther Behnke	29 – 19 January 1963		Bayer Giants Leverkusen	(Germany)
G	5	Henrik Rödl	23 – 4 March 1969	2.00 m (6 ft 7 in)	North Carolina Tar Heels	(United States)
G	6	Armin Andres	33 – 5 April 1959		MTV 1846 Gießen	(Germany)
F	7	Stephan Baeck	27 – 12 April 1965	1.92 m (6 ft 4 in)	Bayer Giants Leverkusen	(Germany)
F	8	Arnd Neuhaus	24 – 26 September 1967		Brandt Hagen	(Germany)
F	9	Henning Harnisch	24 – 15 April 1968		Bayer Giants Leverkusen	(Germany)
C	10	Uwe Blab	30 – 26 March 1962		Alba Berlin	(Germany)
F	11	Detlef Schrempf	29 – 21 January 1963		Indiana Pacers	(United States)
C	12	Hans-Jürgen Gnad	29 – 4 June 1963	2.07 m (6 ft 9 in)	Billy Desio	(Italy)
G	13	Kai Nürnberger	26 – 7 June 1966		TTL Bamberg	(Germany)
C	14	Jens Kujawa	27 – 28 January 1965		BSG Basket Ludwigsburg	(Germany)
F	15	Michael Jackel	32 – 19 October 1959		TTL Bamberg	(Germany)

Head coach

- (Serbia and Montenegro) Svetislav Pešić

Legend

- Club – describes last
  club before the competition
- Age – describes age
  on 26 July 1992

Group play

Pos	Team	Pld	W	L	PF	PA	PD	Pts	Qualification
1	United States	5	5	0	579	350	+229	10	Quarterfinals
2	Croatia	5	4	1	423	400	+23	9	Quarterfinals
3	Brazil	5	2	3	420	463	−43	7 (Note: Head-to-head record: Brazil 1–0 Germany)	Quarterfinals
4	Germany	5	2	3	369	432	−63	7	Quarterfinals
5	Angola	5	1	4	324	392	−68	6 (Note: Head-to-head record: Angola 1–0 Spain)	9th−12th classification round
6	Spain (H)	5	1	4	398	476	−78	6	9th−12th classification round

Source: FIBA
Rules for classification: 1) points; 2) head-to-head points; 3) head-to-head goal average; 4) head-to-head number of points scored.
(H) Hosts
Notes:

26 July 1992
20:30
v

Boxscore

Germany	83–74	Spain
Scoring by half: 46–39, 37–35
Pts: Schrempf 26; Rebs: Gnad 20; Asts: Schrempf 4		Pts: Villacampa 21; Rebs: San Epifanio 7 Asts: Villacampa 2

Palau Municipal d'Esports de Badalona, Barcelona

27 July 1992
14:30
v

Boxscore

Angola	63–64	Germany
Scoring by half: 42–36, 21–28
Pts: Conceição, Sousa 18; Rebs: Conceição 6 Asts: Macedo 5		Pts: Schrempf 25; Rebs: Schrempf 15; Asts: Rödl, Schrempf 2

Palau Municipal d'Esports de Badalona, Barcelona

29 July 1992
20:30
v

Boxscore

United States	111–68	Germany
Scoring by half: 58–23, 53–45
Pts: Bird 19; Rebs: Malone 5 Asts: Jordan 12		Pts: Jackel, Schrempf 15; Rebs: Schrempf 8 Asts: Rödl, Schrempf 2

Palau Municipal d'Esports de Badalona, Barcelona

31 July 1992
20:30
v

Boxscore

Croatia	99–78	Germany
Scoring by half: 46–41, 56–37
Pts: Petrović 26; Rebs: Kukoč 7 Asts: Komazec, Kukoč 4		Pts: Jackel, Schrempf 25; Rebs: Schrempf 8 Asts: Rödl 5

Palau Municipal d'Esports de Badalona, Barcelona

2 August 1992
9:30
v

Boxscore

Germany	76–85	Brazil
Scoring by half: 40–39, 36–46
Pts: Schrempf 27; Rebs: Gnad 10; Asts: Rödl 3		Pts: Villas 27; Rebs: Santos 11; Asts: Maury 6

Palau Municipal d'Esports de Badalona, Barcelona

Quarterfinal

4 August 1992
16:30
v

Boxscore

CIS	83–76	Germany
Scoring by half: 35–36, 48–40
Pts: Tikhonenko 26; Rebs: Volkov 14; Asts: Volkov 4		Pts: Schrempf 32; Rebs: Schrempf 10; Asts: Rödl, Schrempf 3

Palau Municipal d'Esports de Badalona, Barcelona

Classification 5th-8th place

6 August 1992
20:30
v

Boxscore

Australia	109–79	Germany
Scoring by half: 52–44, 57–35
Pts: Gaze 30; Rebs: Bradtke 11; Asts: Smyth 6		Pts: Jackel 19; Rebs: Gnad 11; Asts: Schrempf 5

Palau Municipal d'Esports de Badalona, Barcelona

7th place match

8 August 1992
20:00
v

Boxscore

Puerto Rico	86–96	Germany
Scoring by half: 46–45, 40–51
Pts: Carter 25; Rebs: Mincy 5 Asts: López 2		Pts: Schrempf 24; Rebs: Gnad 15; Asts: Schrempf 7

Palau Municipal d'Esports de Badalona, Barcelona

== Boxing ==
Athlete	Event	Round of 32	Round of 16	Quarterfinals	Semifinals	Final	
Athlete	Event	Opposition Result	Opposition Result	Opposition Result	Opposition Result	Opposition Result	Rank
Jan Quast	Light flyweight	Zbir (MAR); W 6–0	Phosuwan (THA); W 11–2	Barbu (ROU); W 15–7	Petrov (BUL); L 9–15	Did not advance	3rd place, bronze medalist(s)
Mario Loch	Flyweight	Khadpo (THA); W RSC R2	Serradas (VEN); L 4–9	Did not advance			
Dieter Berg	Bantamweight	Achik (MAR); L 0–3	Did not advance				
Andreas Tews	Featherweight	Kirkorov (BUL); W 9–5	Lifa (FRA); W 9–4	Park (KOR); W 17–7	Soltani (ALG); W 11–1	Reyes (ESP); W 16–7	1st place, gold medalist(s)
Marco Rudolph	Lightweight	Nistor (ROU); W 10–5	Snarski (POL); W 10–1	Lorcy (FRA); W 13–10	Bayarsaikhan (MGL); W Walkover	De La Hoya (USA); L 2–7	2nd place, silver medalist(s)
Andreas Zülow	Light welterweight	Kim (KOR); W 12–0	Vinent (CUB); L 2–14	Did not advance			
Andreas Otto	Welterweight	Lewis (GUY); W 8–7	Romero (NCA); W RSC R3	Carruth (IRL); L 6–6*	Did not advance		
Markus Beyer	Light middleweight	Figota (NZL); W 16–2	Lemus (CUB); L RSC R1	Did not advance			
Sven Ottke	Middleweight	Santiago (PUR); W 15–2	Lentz (DEN); W 9–2	Hernández (CUB); L 6–14	Did not advance		
Torsten May	Light heavyweight	Kim (PRK); W 9–1	Brown (CAN); W 7–1	Griffin (USA); W 6–4	Bartnik (POL); W 8–6	Zaulychnyi (EUN); W 8–3	1st place, gold medalist(s)
Bert Teuchert	Heavyweight	Ibarra (ARG); W 5–1	Savón (CUB); L 2–11	Did not advance			
Willi Fischer	Super heavyweight	Sarir (MAR); W RSC R2	Nijman (NED); W 22–5	Rusinov (BUL); L 5–8	Did not advance		

== Canoeing ==
=== Slalom ===
Athlete	Event	Run 1	Rank	Run 2	Rank	Best	Rank
Sören Kaufmann	Men's C-1	124.80	8	133.97	17	124.80	17
Martin Lang	Men's C-1	120.67	5	119.19	6	119.19	6
Manfred Berro; Michael Trummer	Men's C-2	170.60	16	132.83	7	132.83	9
Thomas Loose; Frank Hemmer	Men's C-2	144.47	11	136.03	10	136.03	13
Udo Raumann; Rüdiger Hübbers	Men's C-2	146.05	12	306.51	17	146.05	14
Thomas Becker	Men's K-1	119.38	20	120.63	21	119.38	26
Jochen Lettmann	Men's K-1	108.52	1	109.72	4	108.52	3rd place, bronze medalist(s)
Jens Vorsatz	Men's K-1	120.51	23	124.37	27	120.51	29
Elisabeth Micheler	Women's K-1	136.19	2	126.41	1	126.41	1st place, gold medalist(s)
Eva Roth	Women's K-1	152.53	17	132.29	3	132.29	4
Cordula Striepecke	Women's K-1	136.51	3	134.49	5	134.49	6

=== Sprint ===
Men

Athlete	Event	Heats		Repechage		Semifinals		Final	
Athlete	Event	Time	Rank	Time	Rank	Time	Rank	Time	Rank
Olaf Heukrodt	C-1 500 metres	1:53.91	2 SF	Bye		1:53.74	2 F	1:53.00	3rd place, bronze medalist(s)
Matthias Röder	C-1 1000 metres	4:02.57	1 SF	Bye		4:02.94	1 F	4:08.96	4
Ulrich Papke; Ingo Spelly	C-2 500 metres	1:40.53	1 F	—N/a		Bye		1:41.68	2nd place, silver medalist(s)
Ulrich Papke; Ingo Spelly	C-2 1000 metres	3:32.08	1 F	—N/a		Bye		3:37.42	1st place, gold medalist(s)
Jens Stegemann	K-1 1000 metres	3:43.22	3 R	3:33.15	1 SF	3:41.72	8	Did not advance	
Kay Bluhm; Torsten Gutsche	K-2 500 metres	1:33.95	1 SF	Bye		1:28.11	1 F	1:28.27	1st place, gold medalist(s)
Kay Bluhm; Torsten Gutsche	K-2 1000 metres	3:13.36	1 SF	Bye		3:17.64	1 F	3:16.10	1st place, gold medalist(s)
Mario von Appen; Oliver Kegel; Thomas Reineck; André Wohllebe	K-4 1000 metres	2:52.17	1	—N/a		2:54.80	1 F	2:54.18	1st place, gold medalist(s)

Women

Athlete	Event	Heats		Semifinals		Final	
Athlete	Event	Time	Rank	Time	Rank	Time	Rank
Birgit Schmidt	K-1 500 metres	1:52.49	1	1:52.13	2 F	1:51.60	1st place, gold medalist(s)
Ramona Portwich; Anke von Seck	K-2 500 metres	1:41.82	1	1:40.50	1 F	1:40.29	1st place, gold medalist(s)
Katrin Borchert; Birgit Schmidt; Anke von Seck; Ramona Portwich	K-4 500 metres	1:34.13	3 SF	1:37.48	1 F'	1:38.47	2nd place, silver medalist(s)

== Cycling ==
Seventeen cyclists, thirteen men and four women, represented Germany in 1992.

=== Road ===
Men

Athlete	Event	Time	Rank
Christian Meyer	Road race	4:35:56	68
Steffen Wesemann	Road race	4:35:56	30
Erik Zabel	Road race	4:35:56	4
Bernd Dittert; Christian Meyer; Uwe Peschel; Michael Rich	Team time trial	2:01:39	1st place, gold medalist(s)

Women

Athlete	Event	Time	Rank
Jutta Niehaus	Road race	2:09:42	44
Viola Paulitz	Road race	2:05:03	19
Petra Roßner	Road race	2:05:03	28

=== Track ===
Sprint

Athlete	Event	Qualification		Round 1	Repechage		Round 2	Repechage 2	Quarterfinals	Semifinals	Final	
Athlete	Event	Qualification		Round 1	Round 1	Round 2	Round 2	Repechage 2	Quarterfinals	Semifinals	Final	
Athlete	Event	Time Speed (km/h)	Rank	Opposition Time Speed (km/h)	Opposition Time Speed (km/h)	Opposition Time Speed (km/h)	Opposition Time Speed (km/h)	Opposition Time Speed (km/h)	Opposition Time Speed (km/h)	Opposition Time Speed (km/h)	Opposition Time Speed (km/h)	Rank
Jens Fiedler	Men's sprint	10.252	1	Andrews (NZL); W 11.339	Bye		Ķiksis (LAT), Schoefs (BEL); W 11.285	Bye	Carpenter (USA); W, W	Chiappa (ITA); W, W	Neiwand (AUS); W, W	1st place, gold medalist(s)
Annett Neumann	Women's sprint	11.689	3	Salumäe (EST), Larreal (VEN); L	Paraskevin-Young (USA); W 12.238	—N/a			Dubnicoff (CAN); W, W	Haringa (NED); L, W, W	Salumäe (EST); W, L. L	2nd place, silver medalist(s)

Time trial

Athlete	Event	Time	Rank
Jens Glücklich	Time trial	1:04.798	4

Pursuit

Athlete	Event	Qualification		Quarterfinals	Semifinals	Final	
Athlete	Event	Time	Rank	Opposition Time	Opposition Time	Opposition Time	Rank
Jens Lehmann	Men's individual pursuit	4:30.054	2 Q	Gonchenkov (EUN); W 4:27.715	Anderson (NZL); W 4:27.230	Boardman (GBR); L overtaken	2nd place, silver medalist(s)
Petra Roßner	Women's individual pursuit	3:43.091	2 Q	van Moorsel (NED); W 3:41.509	Malmberg (DEN); W 3:48.517	Watt (AUS); W 3:41.753	1st place, gold medalist(s)
Guido Fulst; Michael Glöckner; Jens Lehmann; Stefan Steinweg; Andreas Walzer	Men's team pursuit	4:14.934	2 Q	New Zealand; W 4:10.980	Denmark; W 4:10.446	Australia; W 4:08.791	1st place, gold medalist(s)

Points race

Athlete	Event	Qualification			Final		
Athlete	Event	Laps	Points	Rank	Laps	Points	Rank
Guido Fulst	Points race	−1 lap	21	6 Q	0 laps	24	7

== Diving ==
Men

Athlete	Event	Qualification		Final	
Athlete	Event	Points	Rank	Points	Rank
Jan Hempel	3 m springboard	353.85	18	Did not advance	
Albin Killat	3 m springboard	392.10	3 Q	556.35	10
Jan Hempel	10 m platform	426.27	3 Q	574.17	4
Michael Kühne	10 m platform	393.21	6 Q	558.54	7

Women

Athlete	Event	Qualification		Final	
Athlete	Event	Points	Rank	Points	Rank
Brita Baldus	3 m springboard	312.90	2 Q	503.07	3rd place, bronze medalist(s)
Simona Koch	3 m springboard	281.46	10 Q	468.96	7
Monika Kühn	10 m platform	270.51	20	Did not advance	
Ute Wetzig	10 m platform	284.13	14	Did not advance	

== Equestrian ==
=== Dressage ===
Athlete	Horse	Event	Qualification		Final	
Athlete	Horse	Event	Score	Rank	Score	Rank
Klaus Balkenhol	Goldstern	Individual	1694	3 Q	1515	3rd place, bronze medalist(s)
Monica Theodorescu	Grunox	Individual	1676	4	Did not advance	
Nicole Uphoff	Rembrandt	Individual	1768	1 Q	1626	1st place, gold medalist(s)
Isabell Werth	Gigolo	Individual	1762	2 Q	1551	2nd place, silver medalist(s)
Klaus Balkenhol; Monica Theodorescu; Nicole Uphoff; Isabell Werth	See above	Team	—N/a		5224	1st place, gold medalist(s)

=== Eventing ===
Athlete	Horse	Event	Dressage		Cross-country			Jumping			Total	
Athlete	Horse	Event	Penalties	Rank	Penalties	Total	Rank	Penalties	Total	Rank	Penalties	Rank
Matthias Baumann	Alabaster	Individual	43.80	1	93.60	137.40	35	20.00	157.40	34	157.40	34
Herbert Blöcker	Feine Dame	Individual	52.20	13	27.60	79.80	3	1.50	81.30	2	81.30	2nd place, silver medalist(s)
Ralf Ehrenbrink	Kildare	Individual	62.80	31	40.80	103.60	15	5.00	108.60	11	108.60	11
Cord Mysegaes	Ricardo	Individual	52.00	12	48.40	100.40	12	10.00	110.40	13	110.40	13
Matthias Baumann; Herbert Blöcker; Ralf Ehrenbrink; Cord Mysegaes	See above	Team	148.00	2	116.80	283.80	4	16.50	300.30	3	300.30	3rd place, bronze medalist(s)

=== Jumping ===
Athlete	Horse	Event	Qualification								Final					
Athlete	Horse	Event	Round 1		Round 2		Round 3		Total		Round 1		Round 2		Total	
Athlete	Horse	Event	Score	Rank	Score	Rank	Score	Rank	Score	Rank	Penalties	Rank	Penalties	Rank	Penalties	Rank
Otto Becker	Lucky Luke	Individual	22.50	65	48.00	39	57.00	30	127.50	50	Did not advance					
Ludger Beerbaum	Classic Touch	Individual	82.50	1	0.00	78	83.00	5	165.50	23 Q	0.00	1 Q	0.00	1	0.00	1st place, gold medalist(s)
Franke Sloothaak	Prestige	Individual	30.50	56	21.50	65	–	–	52.00	72	Did not advance					
Sören von Rönne	Taggi	Individual	56.00	29	72.50	8	87.00	1	215.50	2 Q	12.00	26	Did not advance			
Otto Becker; Ludger Beerbaum; Franke Sloothaak; Sören von Rönne	See above	Team	—N/a								24.00	10	32.50	13	56.50	11

== Fencing ==
20 fencers, 15 men and 5 women represented Germany in 1992.

Individual
Pool stage

Athlete	Event	Group Stage						
Athlete	Event	Opposition Result	Opposition Result	Opposition Result	Opposition Result	Opposition Result	Opposition Result	Rank
Ulrich Schreck	Men's foil	Ludwig (AUT); W 5–4	Wu (HKG); W 5–3	Nagano (JPN); W 5–2	McKenzie (GBR); W 5–3	García (CUB); L 2–5	—N/a	13 Q
Udo Wagner	Men's foil	Davis (GBR); L 0–5	Érsek (HUN); W 5–4	Bravin (USA); W 5–2	da Ponte (PAR); W 5–0	Wong (SGP); W 5–3	Richter (AUT); L 4–5	17 Q
Thorsten Weidner	Men's foil	Ye (CHN); L 4–5	Grigoryev (EUN); W 5–1	Marx (USA); W 5–2	Torres (PHI); W 5–1	Tan (SGP); W 5–2	Kim (KOR); L 3–5	15 Q
Elmar Borrmann	Men's épée	Lenglet (FRA); W 5–2	Lee (KOR); W 5–1	Ječmínek (TCH); W 5–4	Arnold (AUS); W 5–1	El-Khoury (LBN); W 5–3	Strydom (RSA); W 5–3	1 Q
Robert Felisiak	Men's épée	Kulcsár (HUN); L 4–5	O'Brien (IRL); W 5–4	Marx (USA); W 5–1	Pereira (ESP); W 5–3	Bandeira (POR); W 5–3	Álvarez (PAR); W 5–2	9 Q
Arnd Schmitt	Men's épée	Kolobkov (EUN); L 5–5*	Lundblad (SWE); L 3–5	di Tella (ARG); W 5–3	Wong (SGP); W 5–1	Frazão (POR); W 5–1	Zuikov (EST); L 2–5	30 Q
Felix Becker	Men's sabre	Olech (POL); W 5–3	Yang (CHN); W 5–2	Banos (CAN); W 5–4	Mullins (CRC); W 5–3	Meglio (ITA); L 4–5	—N/a	6 Q
Jörg Kempenich	Men's sabre	Kościelniakowski (POL); W 5–1	Williams (GBR); W 5–4	Grigore (ROU); W 5–4	Al-Baker (KSA); W 5–0	Lamour (FRA); L 3–5	—N/a	4 Q
Jürgen Nolte	Men's sabre	Szabo (ROU); L 4–5	Banos (CAN); W 5–3	Mormando (USA); W 5–2	Menalda (BRA); W 5–3	Gniewkowski (POL); L 4–5	—N/a	17 Q
Sabine Bau	Women's foil	Glikina (EUN); L 3–5	Grigorescu (ROU); L 2–5	Wolnicka (POL); W 5–2	Sullivan (USA); W 5–0	Kim (KOR); L 4–5	—N/a	31 Q
Annette Dobmeier	Women's foil	Mincza (HUN); L 4–5	Xiao (CHN); L 2–5	Czuckermann-Hatuel (ISR); L 4–5	McIntosh (GBR); W 5–1	Aubin (CAN); W 5–2	—N/a	31 Q
Zita Funkenhauser	Women's foil	Velichko (EUN); W 5–3	Esquerdo (ESP); W 5–4	O'Neill (USA); W 5–3	Strachan (GBR); W 5–3	Wang (CHN); L 4–5	—N/a	9 Q

Elimination phase

Athlete	Event	Round 1	Round 2	Round 3	Round 4	Repechage				Quarterfinals	Semifinals	Final	
Athlete	Event	Round 1	Round 2	Round 3	Round 4	Round 1	Round 2	Round 3	Round 4	Quarterfinals	Semifinals	Final	
Athlete	Event	Opposition Result	Opposition Result	Opposition Result	Opposition Result	Opposition Result	Opposition Result	Opposition Result	Opposition Result	Opposition Result	Opposition Result	Opposition Result	Rank
Ulrich Schreck	Men's foil	Bye	García (CUB); W 2–1	Borella (ITA); L 0–2	—N/a	Bye	Wagner (GER); L 1–2	Did not advance					
Udo Wagner	Men's foil	Bye	Gregory (CUB); L 1–2	—N/a		Lo (HKG); W 2–0	Schreck (GER); W 2–1	Érsek (HUN); W 2–0	Numa (ITA); W 2–0	Borella (ITA); W 2–1	Omnés (FRA); L 1–2	Gregory (CUB); L 1–2	4
Thorsten Weidner	Men's foil	Bye	Richter (AUT); L 1–2	—N/a		Ye (CHN); L 0–2	Did not advance						
Elmar Borrmann	Men's épée	Bye	Chang (KOR); W 2–0	Shuvalov (EUN); W 2–0	Vánky (SWE); W 2–1	Bye				Henry (FRA); L 1–2	Did not advance		
Robert Felisiak	Men's épée	Bye	Nowosielski (CAN); W 2–0	Henry (FRA); W 2–1	Kolobkov (EUN); L 0–2	Bye			Mazzoni (ITA); L 0–2	Did not advance			
Arnd Schmitt	Men's épée	di Tella (ARG); W 2–0	Srecki (FRA); L 0–2	—N/a		Depta (TCH); L 0–2	Did not advance						
Felix Becker	Men's sabre	Bye	Chiculiță (ROU); W 2–1	Szabó (HUN); L 1–2	—N/a	Bye	Yang (CHN); W 2–0	Olech (POL); L 1–2	Did not advance				
Jörg Kempenich	Men's sabre	Bye	Williams (GBR); W 2–0	Kiriyenko (EUN); L 1–2	—N/a	Bye	Grigore (ROU); L 0–2	Did not advance					
Jürgen Nolte	Men's sabre	Bye	Kościelniakowski (POL); W 2–1	Banos (CAN); W 2–0	Meglio (ITA); L 0–2	Bye			Daurelle (FRA); W 2–0	Scalzo (ITA); L 1–2	Did not advance		
Sabine Bau	Women's foil	Esquerdo (ESP); W 2–0	Bortolozzi (ITA); W 2–0	Sobczak (POL); W 2–0	Modaine (FRA); W 2–1	Bye				Trillini (ITA); L 0–2	Did not advance		
Annette Dobmeier	Women's foil	Meygret (FRA); L 1–2	Did not advance										
Zita Funkenhauser	Women's foil	Bye	Castillejo (ESP); W 2–0	Wang (CHN); L 1–2	—N/a	Bye	Czuckermann-Hatuel (ISR); W 2–0	Grigorescu (ROU); L 1–2	Did not advance				

Team

Athlete	Event	Group Stage			Quarterfinals	Semifinals	Final	
Athlete	Event	Opposition Result	Opposition Result	Rank	Opposition Result	Opposition Result	Opposition Result	Rank
Alexander Koch; Ulrich Schreck; Udo Wagner; Thorsten Weidner; Ingo Weißenborn	Men's foil	South Korea; W 9–2	Austria; W 9–3	1 Q	France; W 9–5	Hungary; W 8–5	Cuba; W 8*–8	1st place, gold medalist(s)
Elmar Borrmann; Robert Felisiak; Uwe Proske; Wladimir Reznitschenko; Arnd Schmitt	Men's épée	Hungary; L 5–9	Romania; W 9–2	2 Q	Italy; W 8–2	Unified Team; W 8–7	Hungary; W 8–4	1st place, gold medalist(s)
Felix Becker; Jacek Huchwajda; Jörg Kempenich; Jürgen Nolte; Steffen Wiesinger	Men's sabre	Poland; W 9–3	Great Britain; W 9–2	1 Q	Hungary; L 3–9	China; W 9–4	Poland; W 9–6	5
Sabine Bau; Annette Dobmeier; Anja Fichtel-Mauritz; Zita Funkenhauser; Monika Weber-Koszto	Women's foil	Romania; W 9–5	Canada; W 9–0	1 Q	France; W 8*–8	Unified Team; W 9–4	Italy; L 6–9	2nd place, silver medalist(s)

== Gymnastics ==
=== Artistic ===
==== Men ====
Team

Athlete	Event	Qualification							
Athlete	Event	Apparatus						Total	Rank
Athlete	Event	F	PH	R	V	PB	HB	Total	Rank
Ralf Büchner	Team	19.025	19.250	19.150	19.150	19.075	18.750	114.400	33
Mario Franke	Team	19.025	18.675	19.450	18.500	18.375	19.150	113.175	50
Sylvio Kroll	Team	19.250	18.800	19.250	19.250 Q	19.150	19.150	114.850	26 Q
Sven Tippelt	Team	19.000	18.775	19.500	18.650	18.900	18.950	113.775	41
Oliver Walther	Team	19.025	19.100	19.125	18.875	19.050	19.250	114.425	31 Q
Andreas Wecker	Team	19.475 Q	19.550 Q	19.750 Q	19.125	19.375 Q	19.600 Q	116.875	4 Q
Total	Team	95.925	95.575	97.150	95.075	95.600	96.250	575.575	4

Individual finals

Athlete	Event	Apparatus						Total	Rank
Athlete	Event	F	PH	R	V	PB	HB	Total	Rank
Sylvio Kroll	All-around	9.275	9.125	9.500	9.800	9.575	9.425	56.700	26
Sylvio Kroll	Vault	—N/a			9.662	—N/a		9.662	6
Oliver Walther	All-around	9.325	9.800	9.600	9.625	9.500	9.625	57.475	13
Andreas Wecker	All-around	9.700	9.850	9.700	9.850	9.800	9.550	58.450	4
Andreas Wecker	Floor	9.687	—N/a					9.687	7
Andreas Wecker	Pommel horse	—N/a	9.887	—N/a				9.887	3rd place, bronze medalist(s)
Andreas Wecker	Rings	—N/a		9.862	—N/a			9.862	3rd place, bronze medalist(s)
Andreas Wecker	Parallel bars	—N/a				9.612	—N/a	9.612	7
Andreas Wecker	Horizontal bar	—N/a					9.837	9.837	2nd place, silver medalist(s)

==== Women ====
Team

Athlete	Event	Qualification					
Athlete	Event	Apparatus				Total	Rank
Athlete	Event	V	UB	BB	F	Total	Rank
Jana Günther	Team	19.387	19.274	18.912	19.262	76.835	56
Annette Potempa	Team	19.549	18.324	19.187	18.862	75.922	74
Diana Schröder	Team	19.362	19.437	19.249	19.412	77.460	40 q
Anke Schönfelder	Team	19.537	18.562	18.599	19.450	76.148	71
Kathleen Stark	Team	19.624	19.574	19.012	19.587	77.797	34 Q
Gabriele Weller	Team	19.525	18.474	18.862	19.087	75.948	73
Total	Team	97.672	95.683	95.647	96.873	385.875	9

Individual finals

Athlete	Event	Apparatus				Total	Rank
Athlete	Event	V	UB	BB	F	Total	Rank
Diana Schröder	All-around	9.712	9.762	9.500	9.650	38.624	29
Kathleen Stark	All-around	9.687	8.962	9.800	9.825	38.274	32

=== Rhythmic ===
Athlete	Event	Qualification						Final						
Athlete	Event	Hoop	Rope	Clubs	Ball	Total	Rank	Qualification	Hoop	Rope	Clubs	Ball	Total	Rank
Christiane Klumpp	Individual	9.300	9.350	9.125	8.575	36.350	20 Q	18.175	9.300	9.250	9.250	—N/a	45.975	10

== Handball ==
Summary

Key:

- ET: After extra time
- P – Match decided by penalty-shootout.

Team	Event	Group stage						Semifinal	Final / BM	
Team	Event	Opposition Score	Opposition Score	Opposition Score	Opposition Score	Opposition Score	Rank	Opposition Score	Opposition Score	Rank
Germany men's	Men's tournament	Unified Team; L 15–25	Romania; D 20–20	France; L 20–23	Egypt; W 24–16	Spain; L 18–19	5	—N/a	Czechoslovakia; L 19–20	10
Germany women's	Women's tournament	Nigeria; W 32–17	United States; W 32–16	Unified Team; L 22–28	—N/a		2 Q	South Korea; L 25–26	Unified Team; L 20–24	4

=== Men's tournament ===
Team roster

- Andreas Thiel
- Bernd Roos
- Frank-Michael Wahl
- Hendrik Ochel
- Holger Schneider
- Holger Winselmann
- Jan Holpert
- Jochen Fraatz
- Klaus-Dieter Petersen
- Matthias Hahn
- Michael Klemm
- Michael Krieter
- Richard Ratka
- Stephan Hauck
- Volker Zerbe
- Wolfgang Schwenke
- Head coach: Horst Bredemeier

Group play

Pos	Team	Pld	W	D	L	GF	GA	GD	Pts	Qualification
1	Unified Team	5	5	0	0	121	98	+23	10	Semifinals
2	France	5	4	0	1	111	98	+13	8	Semifinals
3	Spain (H)	5	3	0	2	97	98	−1	6	Fifth place game
4	Romania	5	1	1	3	107	115	−8	3 (Note: 25% rule: Romania –9 GD; Germany –14 GD)	Seventh place game
5	Germany	5	1	1	3	97	103	−6	3	Ninth place game
6	Egypt	5	0	0	5	92	113	−21	0	Eleventh place game

(H) Hosts
Notes:

27 July 1992; 16:00	Unified Team	25–15	Germany	Palau d'Esports de Granollers, Granollers; Referees: Jug, Jeglič (SLO)
27 July 1992; 16:00	Dujshebaev 7	(12–7)	Hauck 5	Palau d'Esports de Granollers, Granollers; Referees: Jug, Jeglič (SLO)

29 July 1992; 16:00	Germany	20–20	Romania	Palau d'Esports de Granollers, Granollers; Referees: Christensen, Jørgensen (DEN)
29 July 1992; 16:00	Winselmann 5	(9–13)	Licu, Zaharia 5	Palau d'Esports de Granollers, Granollers; Referees: Christensen, Jørgensen (DEN)

31 July 1992; 16:00	Germany	20–23	France	Palau d'Esports de Granollers, Granollers; Referees: Johansson, Kjellkvist (SWE)
31 July 1992; 16:00	three players 4	(9–10)	Lathoud, Munier 5	Palau d'Esports de Granollers, Granollers; Referees: Johansson, Kjellkvist (SWE)

2 August 1992; 14:30	Egypt	16–24	Germany	Palau d'Esports de Granollers, Granollers; Referees: Convents, Xhonneux (BEL)
2 August 1992; 14:30	El-Attar 6	(5–13)	Roos 7	Palau d'Esports de Granollers, Granollers; Referees: Convents, Xhonneux (BEL)

4 August 1992; 19:00	Spain	19–18	Germany	Palau d'Esports de Granollers, Granollers; Referees: Øie, Høgsnes (NOR)
4 August 1992; 19:00	Urdiales 7	(8–8)	Hauck 6	Palau d'Esports de Granollers, Granollers; Referees: Øie, Høgsnes (NOR)

9th place game

7 August 1992; 16:00	Czechoslovakia	20–19	Germany	Palau d'Esports de Granollers, Granollers; Referees: Lelong, Tancrez (FRA)
7 August 1992; 16:00	Šetlík 6	(11–8)	Hahn 5	Palau d'Esports de Granollers, Granollers; Referees: Lelong, Tancrez (FRA)

=== Women's tournament ===
Team roster

- Andrea Bölk
- Andrea Stolletz
- Anja Krüger
- Bianca Urbanke
- Birgit Wagner
- Carola Ciszewski
- Eike Bram
- Elena Leonte
- Gabriele Palme
- Kerstin Mühlner
- Michaela Erler
- Rita Köster
- Sabine Adamik
- Silke Fittinger
- Silvia Schmitt
- Sybille Gruner

Group play

Pos	Team	Pld	W	D	L	GF	GA	GD	Pts	Qualification
1	Unified Team	3	3	0	0	77	56	+21	6	Semifinals
2	Germany	3	2	0	1	86	61	+25	4	Semifinals
3	United States	3	1	0	2	55	76	−21	2	Fifth place game
4	Nigeria	3	0	0	3	56	81	−25	0	Seventh place game

30 July 1992; 10:00	Germany	32–17	Nigeria	Palau d'Esports de Granollers, Granollers; Referees: Øie, Høgsnes (NOR)
30 July 1992; 10:00	Mühlner 9	(14–9)	Sana 7	Palau d'Esports de Granollers, Granollers; Referees: Øie, Høgsnes (NOR)

1 August 1992; 15:00	United States	16–32	Germany	Palau d'Esports de Granollers, Granollers; Referees: Convents, Xhonneux (BEL)
1 August 1992; 15:00	Jones 7	(6–16)	Fittinger, Leonte 8	Palau d'Esports de Granollers, Granollers; Referees: Convents, Xhonneux (BEL)

3 August 1992; 16:30	Unified Team	28–22	Germany	Palau d'Esports de Granollers, Granollers; Referees: Rudin, Schill (SUI)
3 August 1992; 16:30	Morskova 14	(14–13)	Ciszewski 5	Palau d'Esports de Granollers, Granollers; Referees: Rudin, Schill (SUI)

Semifinal

6 August 1992; 16:00	South Korea	26–25	Germany	Palau d'Esports de Granollers, Granollers; Referees: Christensen, Jørgensen (DEN)
6 August 1992; 16:00	Lim, Nam 5	(17–13)	Schmitt 7	Palau d'Esports de Granollers, Granollers; Referees: Christensen, Jørgensen (DEN)

Bronze medal game

8 August 1992; 10:00	Germany	20–24	Unified Team	Palau Sant Jordi, Barcelona; Referees: Johansson, Kjellkvist (SWE)
8 August 1992; 10:00	Leonte, Wagner 6	(9–10)	Morskova 6	Palau Sant Jordi, Barcelona; Referees: Johansson, Kjellkvist (SWE)

== Hockey ==
Summary

Key:

- FT – After full time.
- P – Match decided by penalty-shootout.

Team	Event	Group stage						Semifinal	Final / BM	
Team	Event	Opposition Score	Opposition Score	Opposition Score	Opposition Score	Opposition Score	Rank	Opposition Score	Opposition Score	Rank
Germany men's	Men's tournament	India; W 3–0	Great Britain; W 2–0	Australia; D 1–1	Egypt; W 8–2	Argentina; W 2–1	2 Q	Pakistan; W 2–1	Australia; W 2–1	1st place, gold medalist(s)
Germany women's	Women's tournament	Spain; D 2–2	Australia; W 1–0	Canada; W 4–0	—N/a		1 Q	Great Britain; W 2–1	Spain; L 1–2	2nd place, silver medalist(s)

=== Men's tournament ===
Team roster

- Michael Knauth
- Christopher Reitz
- Jan-Peter Tewes
- Carsten Fischer
- Christian Blunck
- Stefan Saliger
- Michael Metz
- Christian Mayerhöfer
- Sven Meinhardt
- Andreas Keller
- Michael Hilgers
- Andreas Becker
- Stefan Tewes
- Klaus Michler
- Volker Fried
- Oliver Kurtz

Group play

Pos	Team	Pld	W	D	L	GF	GA	GD	Pts	Qualification
1	Australia	5	4	1	0	20	2	+18	9	Semi-finals
2	Germany	5	4	1	0	16	4	+12	9	Semi-finals
3	Great Britain	5	3	0	2	7	10	−3	6	5–8th place semi-finals
4	India	5	2	0	3	4	8	−4	4	5–8th place semi-finals
5	Argentina	5	1	0	4	3	12	−9	2	9–12th place semi-finals
6	Egypt	5	0	0	5	4	18	−14	0	9–12th place semi-finals

Source: FIH

26 July 1992
16:00

India	0–3	Germany
	Report	Blunck 18'; Fischer 50'; Tewes 62'

Umpires:
Alan Waterman (CAN)
Santiago Deo (ESP)

28 July 1992
20:00

Germany	2–0	Great Britain
Fischer 16'; Hilgers 30'	Report

Umpires:
Patrick van Beneden (BEL)
Alain Renaud (FRA)

30 July 1992
18:00

Australia	1–1	Germany
Davies 22'	Report	Fischer 53'

Umpires:
Kiyoshi Sana (JPN)
Santiago Deo (ESP)

1 August 1992
09:45

Germany	8–2	Egypt
Fischer 10', 14'; Hilgers 19'; Becker 29', 40', 42', 47'; Blunck 38'	Report	A. Gamal 26', 57'

Umpires:
Guillaume Langle (FRA)
Alan Waterman (CAN)

3 August 1992
18:00

Germany	2–1	Argentina
Fischer 56'; Hilgers 61'	Report	Ferrara 43'

Umpires:
Jose Gortazar (ESP)
Peter von Reth (NED)

Semifinal

5 August 1992
20:00

Pakistan	1–2 (a.e.t.)	Germany
Bashir 28'	Report	Fisher 46', 89'

Umpires:
Alain Renaud (FRA)
Eduardo Ruiz (ARG)

Gold medal game

8 August 1992
19:30

Australia	1–2	Germany
Corbitt 66'	Report	Hilgers 2', 59'

Umpires:
Eduardo Ruiz (ARG)
Santiago Deo (ESP)

=== Women's tournament ===
Team roster

Head coach: (Germany) Rüdiger Hanel

No.	Pos.	Player	Date of birth (age)	Caps	Club
1		Susie Wollschläger	5 May 1967 (aged 25)		
2		Bianca Weiß	24 January 1968 (aged 24)		
3		Tanja Dickenscheid	17 June 1969 (aged 23)		
4		Susanne Müller	12 May 1972 (aged 20)		
5		Nadine Ernsting	5 February 1974 (aged 18)		
6		Simone Thomaschinski	4 April 1970 (aged 22)		
7		Irina Kuhnt	18 January 1968 (aged 24)		
8		Anke Wild	12 October 1967 (aged 24)		
9		Franziska Hentschel	29 June 1970 (aged 22)		
10		Tina Peters	24 March 1968 (aged 24)		
11		Eva Hagenbäumer	5 January 1967 (aged 25)		
12		Britta Becker	11 May 1973 (aged 19)		
13		Caren Jungjohann	23 December 1967 (aged 24)		
14		Christine Ferneck	29 April 1968 (aged 24)		
15		Heike Lätzsch	19 December 1973 (aged 18)		
16		Katrin Kauschke	13 September 1971 (aged 20)		

Group play

Teams	Pld	W	D	L	GF	GA	GD	Pts
Germany	3	2	1	0	7	2	+5	5
Spain	3	2	1	0	5	3	+2	5
Australia	3	1	0	2	2	2	0	2
Canada	3	0	0	3	1	8	−7	0

27 July 1992
17:30

Spain	2–2	Germany
Motos 35+', 47'	Report	Hentschel 17', 27'

Umpires:
Gill Clarke (GBR)
Jolanda Mohlmann (NED)

29 July 1992
17:30

Australia	0–1	Germany
	Report	Becker 65'

Umpires:
Laura Crespo (ARG)
Dominique Ache (BEL)

2 August 1992
18:00

Canada	0–4	Germany
	Report	Dickenscheid 12'; Hentschel 16', 57'; Becker 22'

Umpires:
Renee Chatas (USA)
Dominique Ache (BEL)

Semifinal

4 August 1992
17:00

Germany	2–1	Great Britain
Ernsting-Krienke 12'; Lätzsch 59'	Report	Sixsmith 32'

Umpires:
Jolanda Mohlmann (NED)
Laura Crespo (ARG)

Gold medal game

7 August 1992
19:30

(silver) Germany	1–2 (a.e.t.)	Spain (gold)
Hentschel 12'	Report	Carmen Barea 8'; Maragall 83'

Umpires:
Dominique Ache (BEL)
Peri Buckley (AUS)

== Judo ==
Men

Athlete	Event	Round of 64	Round of 32	Round of 16	Quarterfinals	Semifinals	Repechage			Final	
Athlete	Event	Round of 64	Round of 32	Round of 16	Quarterfinals	Semifinals	Round 1	Round 2	Round 3	Final	
Athlete	Event	Opposition Result	Opposition Result	Opposition Result	Opposition Result	Opposition Result	Opposition Result	Opposition Result	Opposition Result	Opposition Result	Rank
Richard Trautmann	60 kg	Francini (SMR); W Ippon	Beaton (CAN); W Waza-ari	Gough (IRL); W Ippon	Pradayrol (FRA); W Ippon	Yoon (KOR); L Koka	Bye			Wágner (HUN); W Koka	3rd place, bronze medalist(s)
Udo Quellmalz	65 kg	Lorenzo (ESP); W Ippon	El-Murr (LBN); W Ippon	Gao (CHN); W Yuko	Cantin (CAN); W Yuko	Sampaio (BRA); L Chui	Bye			Laats (BEL); W Yusei-gachi	3rd place, bronze medalist(s)
Stefan Dott	71 kg	Bye	Mafuta (ZAI); W Ippon	Carabetta (FRA); W Yusei-gachi	Korhonen (FIN); W Yusei-gachi	Koga (JPN); L Ippon	Bye			Smadja (ISR); L Ippon	5
Daniel Lascau	78 kg	Kim (KOR); L Yuko	Did not advance								
Axel Lobenstein	86 kg	Bye	Villar (ESP); W Ippon	Vismara (ITA); W Shido	Kistler (SUI); W Yuko	Tayot (FRA); L Ippon	Bye			Okada (JPN); L Yusei-gachi	5
Detlef Knorrek	95 kg	Ivan (ROU); L Waza-ari	Did not advance								
Henry Stöhr	+95 kg	—N/a	Milinković (IOA); W Ippon	Douillet (FRA); L Hansoku-make	Did not advance		Gordon (GBR); L Ippon	Did not advance			

Women

Athlete	Event	Round of 32	Round of 16	Quarterfinals	Semifinals	Repechage			Final	
Athlete	Event	Round of 32	Round of 16	Quarterfinals	Semifinals	Round 1	Round 2	Round 3	Final	
Athlete	Event	Opposition Result	Opposition Result	Opposition Result	Opposition Result	Opposition Result	Opposition Result	Opposition Result	Opposition Result	Rank
Kerstin Emich	48 kg	Huang (TPE); W Yuko	Tortora (ITA); L Yuko	Did not advance						
Gudrun Hausch	56 kg	Eck (AUT); L Ippon	Did not advance							
Frauke Eickhoff	61 kg	Petrova (EUN); W Ippon	Gal (NED); W Waza-ari	Vandecaveye (BEL); W Waza-ari	Arad (ISR); L Ippon	—N/a			Zhang (CHN); L Yuko	5
Alexandra Schreiber	66 kg	Martinel (ARG); W Ippon	Lum (GUM); W Ippon	Greaves (CAN); W Ippon	Pierantozzi (ITA); L Ippon	—N/a			Rakels (BEL); L Koka	5
Regina Schüttenhelm	72 kg	Bye	Moreno (CUB); W Koka	Horton (GBR); L Yusei-gachi	Did not advance	Bye	Bacher (USA); W Koka	Juszczak (POL); W Yusei-gachi	de Kok (NED); L Ippon	5
Claudia Weber	+72 kg	Bye	Mun (KOR); W Chui	Sakaue (JPN); L Ippon	Did not advance	Bye	Andrade (BRA); W Kiken-gachi	Gránitz (HUN); W Ippon	Lupino (FRA); L Ippon	5

== Modern pentathlon ==
Three male pentathletes represented Germany in 1992.

Athlete	Event	Fencing (épée one touch)			Swimming (300 m freestyle)			Shooting (Air pistol)			Riding (show jumping)			Running (4000 m)			Total points	Final rank
Athlete	Event	Results	Rank	MP points	Time	Rank	MP points	Points	Rank	MP Points	Penalties	Rank	MP points	Time	Rank	MP Points	Total points	Final rank
Ulrich Czermak	Individual	36	18	830	3:29.3	44	1200	186	24	1060	444	60	656	13:26.6	21	1147	4893	45
Dirk Knappheide	Individual	38	9	864	3:21.1	18	1264	186	24	1060	150	36	950	13:56.9	43	1057	5195	22
Pawel Olszewski	Individual	34	28	796	3:24.0	27	1240	182	42	1000	302	51	798	14:12.6	51	1009	4843	49
Ulrich Czermak; Dirk Knappheide; Pawel Olszewski	Team	108	6	2490	10:14.4	6	3704	554	8	3120	896	15	2404	41:36.1	12	3213	14931	11

== Rowing ==
Men

Athlete	Event	Heats		Repechage		Semifinals		Final	
Athlete	Event	Time	Rank	Time	Rank	Time	Rank	Time	Rank
Thomas Lange	Single sculls	7:08.13	1 SF	Bye		6:54.54	1 FA	6:51.40	1st place, gold medalist(s)
Jens Köppen; Christian Händle; Peter Uhrig (heats only)	Double sculls	6:28.24	1 SF	Bye		6:23.61	4 FB	6:24.27	8
André Willms; Andreas Hajek; Stephan Volkert; Michael Steinbach	Quadruple sculls	5:45.65	1 SF	Bye		5:46.65	1 FA	5:45.17	1st place, gold medalist(s)
Peter Hoeltzenbein; Colin von Ettingshausen	Coxless pair	6:41.65	1 SF	Bye		6:33.72	2 FA	6:32.68	2nd place, silver medalist(s)
Thomas Woddow; Michael Peter; Peter Thiede	Coxed pair	7:07.60	4 R	7:12.78	1 SF	6:53.53	2 FA	6:56.98	4
Armin Weyrauch; Matthias Ungemach; Dirk Balster; Markus Vogt	Coxless four	6:09.07	3 SF	Bye		5:59.38	2 FA	5:58.39	4
Uwe Kellner; Ralf Brudel; Thoralf Peters; Karsten Finger; Hendrik Reiher	Coxed four	6:21.47	1 FA	Bye		—N/a		6:00.34	2nd place, silver medalist(s)
Frank Richter; Thorsten Streppelhoff; Detlef Kirchhoff; Armin Eichholz; Bahne Rabe; Hans Sennewald; Ansgar Wessling; Roland Baar; Manfred Klein	Eight	5:32.98	2 SF	Bye		5:35.60	1 FA	5:31.00	3rd place, bronze medalist(s)

Women

Athlete	Event	Heats		Repechage		Semifinals		Final	
Athlete	Event	Time	Rank	Time	Rank	Time	Rank	Time	Rank
Beate Schramm	Single sculls	8:00.81	3 SF	Bye		7:53.22	4 FB	DNS	12
Kerstin Köppen; Kathrin Boron	Double sculls	7:16.74	1 SF	Bye		7:01.32	1 FA	6:49.00	1st place, gold medalist(s)
Kerstin Müller; Sybille Schmidt; Birgit Peter; Kristina Mundt	Quadruple sculls	6:24.70	1 FA	Bye		—N/a		6:20.18	1st place, gold medalist(s)
Stefani Werremeier; Inge Schwerzmann	Coxless pair	7:43.60	2 SF	Bye		7:14.71	3 FA	7:07.96	2nd place, silver medalist(s)
Antje Frank; Gabriele Mehl; Birte Siech; Annette Hohn	Coxless four	6:49.63	1 FA	Bye		—N/a		6:32.34	3rd place, bronze medalist(s)
Annegret Strauch; Sylvia Dördelmann; Kathrin Haacker; Dana Pyritz; Cerstin Petersmann; Ute Wagner; Christiane Harzendorf; Judith Zeidler; Daniela Neunast	Eight	6:11.70	1 FA	Bye		—N/a		6:07.80	3rd place, bronze medalist(s)

== Sailing ==
Men

Athlete	Event	Race										Net points	Final rank
Athlete	Event	1	2	3	4	5	6	7	8	9	10	Net points	Final rank
Timm Stade	Lechner A-390	20	17	21	18	22	~~51~~	51	24	8	33	214	18
Peter Aldag	Finn	27	15	14	~~36~~	8	20	24	—N/a			108	15
Rolf Schmidt; Wolfgang Hunger	470	~~44~~	44	14	5.7	13	5.7	0	—N/a			82.4	8

Women

Athlete	Event	Race										Net points	Final rank
Athlete	Event	1	2	3	4	5	6	7	8	9	10	Net points	Final rank
Christina Pinnow; Peggy Hardwiger	470	10	13	13	13	5.7	17	~~24~~	—N/a			71.7	8

Open
Fleet racing

Athlete	Event	Race							Net points	Final rank
Athlete	Event	1	2	3	4	5	6	7	Net points	Final rank
Albert Batzill; Peter Lang	Flying Dutchman	5.7	10	14	13	16	11.7	~~25~~	70.4	5
Frank Parlow; Roland Gäbler	Tornado	15	14	~~24~~	10	24	22	5.7	90.7	11
Hans Vogt; Jörg Fricke	Star	13	~~23~~	3	5.7	22	3	23	69.7	6

Match racing

Athlete	Event	Qualification races						Total	Rank	Round Robin					Rank	Semifinals	Final / BM	Rank
Athlete	Event	1	2	3	4	5	6	Total	Rank	USA	DEN	SWE	GBR	ESP	Rank	Semifinals	Final / BM	Rank
Bernd Jäkel; Jochen Schümann; Thomas Flach	Soling	5.7	~~16~~	14	11.7	3	5.7	40.1	3 Q	W	L	W	L	W	3 Q	Denmark; L 0–2	Great Britain; L 1–2	4

== Shooting ==
Men

Athlete	Event	Qualification		Final	
Athlete	Event	Points	Rank	Points	Rank
Hubert Bichler	50 metre rifle three positions	1158	17	Did not advance	
Hubert Bichler	50 metre rifle prone	598	1 Q	701.1	4
Gernot Eder	10 metre air pistol	576	19	Did not advance	
Gernot Eder	50 metre pistol	554	20	Did not advance	
Michael Jakosits	10 metre running target	580	1 Q	673	1st place, gold medalist(s)
Hans-Jürgen Neumaier	10 metre air pistol	578	12	Did not advance	
Hans-Jürgen Neumaier	50 metre pistol	547	33	Did not advance	
René Osthold	25 metre rapid fire pistol	583	15	Did not advance	
Johann Riederer	10 metre air rifle	590	8 Q	691.7	3rd place, bronze medalist(s)
Bernd Rücker	50 metre rifle three positions	1151	29	Did not advance	
Bernd Rücker	50 metre rifle prone	596	10	Did not advance	
Ralf Schumann	25 metre rapid fire pistol	594	1 Q	885	1st place, gold medalist(s)
Matthias Stich	10 metre air rifle	588	13	Did not advance	
Jens Zimmerman	10 metre running target	578	3 Q	667	6

Women

Athlete	Event	Qualification		Final	
Athlete	Event	Points	Rank	Points	Rank
Liselotte Breker	10 metre air pistol	377	15	Did not advance	
Liselotte Breker	25 metre pistol	577	10	Did not advance	
Sonja Pfeilschifter	10 metre air rifle	386	30	Did not advance	
Sonja Pfeilschifter	50 metre rifle three positions	569	28	Did not advance	
Silvia Sperber	10 metre air rifle	392	9	Did not advance	
Silvia Sperber	50 metre rifle three positions	574	20	Did not advance	
Margit Stein	10 metre air pistol	377	15	Did not advance	
Margit Stein	25 metre pistol	571	26	Did not advance	

Open

Athlete	Event	Qualification		Final	
Athlete	Event	Points	Rank	Points	Rank
Matthias Dunkel	Skeet	141	50	Did not advance	
Bernhard Hochwald	Skeet	196	16	Did not advance	
Axel Wegner	Skeet	145	25	Did not advance	
Jörg Damme	Trap	195	2 Q	218	4

== Swimming ==
Men

Athlete	Event	Heats		Final A/B	
Athlete	Event	Time	Rank	Time	Rank
Chris-Carol Bremer	200 metre butterfly	2:00.49	10 FB	1:59.93	9
Christian Geßner	200 metre individual medley	2:02.43	6 FA	2:01.97	5
Christian Geßner	400 metre individual medley	4:19.92	6 FA	4:17.88	5
Martin Herrmann	100 metre butterfly	54.59	13 FB	54.94	14
Martin Herrmann	200 metre butterfly	2:00.47	9 FB	2:01.14	11
Josef Hladky	200 metre individual medley	2:07.18	32	Did not advance	
Jörg Hoffmann	1500 metre freestyle	15:03.95	2 FA	15:02.29	3rd place, bronze medalist(s)
Christian Keller	200 metre freestyle	1:50.07	16 FB	1:50.46	14
Christian Keller	100 metre butterfly	54.47	10 FB	54.30	9
Patrick Kühl	400 metre individual medley	4:18.68	3 FA	4:19.66	6
Stefan Pfeiffer	400 metre freestyle	3:49.99	4 FA	3:49.75	7
Stefan Pfeiffer	1500 metre freestyle	15:13.71	4 FA	15:04.28	4
Mark Pinger	50 metre freestyle	22.88	10 FB	22.88	11
Christian Poswiat	100 metre breaststroke	1:03.85	26	Did not advance	
Christian Poswiat	200 metre breaststroke	2:20.80	29	Did not advance	
Dirk Richter	100 metre backstroke	56.03	8 FA	56.26	8
Dirk Richter	200 metre backstroke	2:00.94	10 FB	Withdrew	
Nils Rudolph	50 metre freestyle	22.70	6 FA	22.73	8
Nils Rudolph	100 metre freestyle	50.29	11 FB	50.62	12
Christian Tröger	100 metre freestyle	50.05	7 FA	49.84	7
Mark Warnecke	100 metre breaststroke	1:02.48	10 FB	1:02.73	13
Tino Weber	100 metre backstroke	56.27	11 FB	56.49	11
Tino Weber	200 metre backstroke	1:59.40	2 FA	1:59.78	6
Sebastian Wiese	400 metre freestyle	3:50.73	7 FA	3:49.06	6
Steffen Zesner	200 metre freestyle	1:48.12	4 FA	1:48.84	7
Christian Tröger; Dirk Richter; Steffen Zesner; Mark Pinger; Andreas Szigat (*); Bengt Zikarsky (*)	4 × 100 metre freestyle relay	3:19.61	4 FA	3:17.90	3rd place, bronze medalist(s)
Peter Sitt; Steffen Zesner; Andreas Szigat; Stefan Pfeiffer; Christian Tröger (*)	4 × 200 metre freestyle relay	7:18.21	2 FA	7:16.58	4
Tino Weber; Mark Warnecke; Christian Keller; Mark Pinger; Bengt Zikarsky (*)	4 × 100 metre medley relay	3:43.00	4 FA	3:40.19	4

Women

Athlete	Event	Heats		Final A/B	
Athlete	Event	Time	Rank	Time	Rank
Daniela Brendel	100 metre breaststroke	1:10.49	7 FA	1:11.05	8
Daniela Brendel	200 metre breaststroke	2:32.09	11 FB	2:32.05	10
Jana Dörries	100 metre breaststroke	1:10.00	6 FA	1:09.77	5
Jana Dörries	200 metre breaststroke	2:34.58	18	Did not advance	
Jana Haas	200 metre individual medley	2:17.74	9 FB	2:20.94	16
Jana Haas	400 metre individual medley	4:49.93	11 FB	4:47.74	9
Dagmar Hase	400 metre freestyle	4:10.92	2 FA	4:07.18	1st place, gold medalist(s)
Dagmar Hase	100 metre backstroke	1:03.35	14 FB	1:02.93	9
Dagmar Hase	200 metre backstroke	2:11.52	3 FA	2:09.46	2nd place, silver medalist(s)
Jana Henke	800 metre freestyle	8:35.11	3 FA	8:30.99	3rd place, bronze medalist(s)
Daniela Hunger	200 metre individual medley	2:15.16	3 FA	2:13.92	3rd place, bronze medalist(s)
Daniela Hunger	400 metre individual medley	4:47.39	7 FA	4:47.57	6
Kerstin Kielgaß	200 metre freestyle	2:00.55	4 FA	1:59.67	3rd place, bronze medalist(s)
Kerstin Kielgaß	400 metre freestyle	4:12.50	4 FA	4:11.52	5
Kerstin Kielgaß	800 metre freestyle	8:43.52	9	Did not advance	
Simone Osygus	50 metre freestyle	25.79	6 FA	25.74	7
Simone Osygus	100 metre freestyle	55.98	7 FA	55.93	7
Bettina Ustrowski	100 metre butterfly	1:02.07	18	Did not advance	
Bettina Ustrowski	200 metre butterfly	2:21.49	26	Did not advance	
Franziska van Almsick	50 metre freestyle	25.96	9 FB	DQ	
Franziska van Almsick	100 metre freestyle	55.40	2 FA	54.94	3rd place, bronze medalist(s)
Franziska van Almsick	200 metre freestyle	1:57.90	1 FA	1:58.00	2nd place, silver medalist(s)
Franziska van Almsick	100 metre butterfly	1:00.02	4 FA	1:00.70	7
Sandra Völker	100 metre backstroke	1:02.90	10 FB	1:04.52	16
Marion Zoller	200 metre backstroke	2:14.53	12 FB	2:13.77	9
Franziska van Almsick; Simone Osygus; Daniela Hunger; Manuela Stellmach; Kerstin Kielgaß (*); Annette Hadding (*)	4 × 100 metre freestyle relay	3:43.58	3 FA	3:41.60	3rd place, bronze medalist(s)
Dagmar Hase; Jana Dörries; Franziska van Almsick; Daniela Hunger; Daniela Brendel (*); Bettina Ustrowski (*); Simone Osygus (*)	4 × 100 metre medley relay	4:10.62	2 FA	4:05.19	2nd place, silver medalist(s)

== Synchronized swimming ==
Two synchronized swimmers represented Germany in 1992.

Athlete	Event	Figures		Qualification			Final		
Athlete	Event	Points	Rank	Points	Total (Figures + Qualification)	Rank	Points	Total (Figures + Final)	Rank
Monika Müller	Solo	84.147	29 Q	90.200	174.347	14	Did not advance		
Margit Schreib	Solo	80.594	47	Did not advance					
Monika Müller; Margit Schreib	Duet	82.370	14	89.800	172.170	14	Did not advance		

== Table tennis ==
Men

Athlete	Event	Group Stage				Round of 16	Quarterfinal	Semifinal	Final	
Athlete	Event	Opposition Result	Opposition Result	Opposition Result	Rank	Opposition Result	Opposition Result	Opposition Result	Opposition Result	Rank
Steffen Fetzner	Singles	Núñez (CHI); W 2–0	Watanabe (JPN); W 2–1	Kim (PRK); W 2–1	1 Q	Persson (SWE); L 0–3	Did not advance			
Jörg Roßkopf	Singles	Ng (CAN); W 2–0	Hyatt (JAM); W 2–0	Mazunov (EUN); W 2–0	1 Q	Li (PRK); W 3–1	Waldner (SWE); L 1–3	Did not advance		
Steffen Fetzner; Jörg Roßkopf	Doubles	Núñez / Morales (CHI); W 2–0	Chila / Chatelain (FRA); W 2–0	Shibutani / Matsushita (JPN); W 2–0	1 Q	—N/a	Grujić / Lupulesku (IOA); W 3–0	Kang / Lee (KOR); W 3–0	Lu / Wang (CHN); L 2–3	2nd place, silver medalist(s)

Women

Athlete	Event	Group Stage				Round of 16	Quarterfinal	Semifinal	Final	
Athlete	Event	Opposition Result	Opposition Result	Opposition Result	Rank	Opposition Result	Opposition Result	Opposition Result	Opposition Result	Rank
Olga Nemes	Singles	Gee (USA); W 2–0	Tepes (CHI); W 2–0	Hong (KOR); L 0–2	2	Did not advances				
Elke Schall	Singles	Arisi (ITA); L 0–2	Qiao (CHN); L 1–2	Roberts (RSA); W 2–0	3	Did not advance				
Elke Schall; Nicole Struse	Doubles	Ciosu / Năstase (ROU); W 2–1	González / Montes (PER); W 2–0	Chen / Jun (CHN); L 0–2	2	—N/a	Did not advance			

== Tennis ==
Men

Athlete	Event	Round of 64	Round of 32	Round of 16	Quarterfinals	Semifinals	Final	
Athlete	Event	Opposition Result	Opposition Result	Opposition Result	Opposition Result	Opposition Result	Opposition Result	Rank
Boris Becker	Singles	Ruud (NOR); W (3–6, 7–6, 5–7, 7–6, 6–3)	El Aynaoui (MAR); W (6–4, 5–7, 6–4, 6–0)	Santoro (FRA); L (1–6, 6–3, 1–6, 3–6)	Did not advance			
Carl-Uwe Steeb	Singles	Pavel (ROU); W (7–5, 6–2, 6–2)	Stich (GER); W (6–4, 6–2, 4–6, 6–3)	Lavalle (MEX); L (4–6, 6–3, 3–6, 2–6)	Did not advance			
Michael Stich	Singles	Fromberg (AUS); W (6–3, 3–6, 6–1, 3–6, 6–3)	Steeb (GER); L (4–6, 2–6, 6–4, 3–6)	Did not advance				
Boris Becker; Michael Stich	Doubles	—N/a	Alami / El Aynaoui (MAR); W walkover	Bavelas / Efraimoglou (GRE); W (6–3, 6–1, 6–4)	Casal / Sánchez (ESP); W (6–3, 4–6, 7–6, 5–7, 6–3)	Frana / Miniussi (ARG); W (7–6, 6–2, 6–7, 2–6, 6–4)	Ferreira / Norval (RSA); W (7–6, 4–6, 7–6, 6–3)	1st place, gold medalist(s)

Women

Athlete	Event	Round of 64	Round of 32	Round of 16	Quarterfinals	Semifinals	Final	
Athlete	Event	Opposition Result	Opposition Result	Opposition Result	Opposition Result	Opposition Result	Opposition Result	Rank
Steffi Graf	Singles	Novelo (MEX); W (6–1, 6–1)	Schultz-McCarthy (NED); W (6–1, 6–0)	Maleeva (BUL); W (6–3, 6–4)	Appelmans (BEL); W (6–1, 6–0)	Fernandez (USA); W (6–4, 6–2)	Capriati (USA); L (6–3, 3–6, 4–6)	2nd place, silver medalist(s)
Anke Huber	Singles	Sawamatsu (JPN); W (6–0, 4–6, 6–2)	Paulus (AUT); W (6–4, 6–1)	Muns-Jagerman (NED); W (7–5, 7–6)	Capriati (USA); L (3–6, 6–7)	Did not advance		
Barbara Rittner	Singles	Labat (ARG); W (6–3, 6–3)	Tauziat (FRA); W (6–3, 6–2)	Sánchez Vicario (ESP); L (6–4, 3–6, 1–6)	Did not advance			
Steffi Graf; Anke Huber	Doubles	—N/a	Basuki / Wibowo (INA); W (6–2, 6–3)	Fernandez / Fernandez (USA); L (6–7, 4–6)	Did not advance			

== Water polo ==
Summary

Key:

- FT – After full time.

Team	Event	Group stage						Classification round		
Team	Event	Opposition Score	Opposition Score	Opposition Score	Opposition Score	Opposition Score	Rank	Opposition Score	Opposition Score	Rank
Germany men's	Men's tournament	France; D 7–7	Unified Team; L 7–11	Czechoslovakia; W 15–9	Australia; D 7–7	United States; L 2–7	4	Hungary; L 7–8	Cuba; W 10–6	7

- Team roster

- Frank Otto
- Hagen Stamm
- Dirk Theissmann
- Ingo Borgmann
- Rene Reimann
- Uwe Sterzik
- Piotr Bukowski
- Raúl de la Peña
- Jörg Dresel
- Torsten Dresel
- Reibel Guido
- Carsten Kusch

Group play

Pos	Team	Pld	W	D	L	GF	GA	GD	Pts
1	Unified Team	5	5	0	0	50	32	+18	10
2	United States	5	4	0	1	40	24	+16	8
3	Australia	5	2	1	2	44	41	+3	5
4	Germany	5	1	2	2	38	41	−3	4
5	France	5	1	1	3	38	42	−4	3
6	Czechoslovakia	5	0	0	5	33	63	−30	0

Source: https://www.olympedia.org/results/38777

1 August 1992; 18:30	France	7–7	Germany	Piscina Municipal de Montjuïc; Referees: Antal Vuszek (HUN), Eugenio Martínez (CUB)
1 August 1992; 18:30	Score by quarters: 2–2, 2–2, 2–3, 1–0			Piscina Municipal de Montjuïc; Referees: Antal Vuszek (HUN), Eugenio Martínez (CUB)
1 August 1992; 18:30	Jeleff 3	Goals	de la Peña 3	Piscina Municipal de Montjuïc; Referees: Antal Vuszek (HUN), Eugenio Martínez (CUB)

2 August 1992; 19:45	Unified Team	11–7	Germany	Piscina Municipal de Montjuïc; Referees: Franco Picchetto (ITA), Wim Keman (NED)
2 August 1992; 19:45	Score by quarters: 4–3, 3–2, 2–0, 2–2			Piscina Municipal de Montjuïc; Referees: Franco Picchetto (ITA), Wim Keman (NED)
2 August 1992; 19:45	Apanasenko 3	Goals	de la Peña, Reimann 2	Piscina Municipal de Montjuïc; Referees: Franco Picchetto (ITA), Wim Keman (NED)

3 August 1992; 12:00	Germany	15–9	Czechoslovakia	Piscinas Bernat Picornell; Referees: Luis Cillero (ESP), Radu Timoc (ROU)
3 August 1992; 12:00	Score by quarters: 2–2, 4–1, 6–3, 3–3			Piscinas Bernat Picornell; Referees: Luis Cillero (ESP), Radu Timoc (ROU)
3 August 1992; 12:00	Stamm 4	Goals	three players 2	Piscinas Bernat Picornell; Referees: Luis Cillero (ESP), Radu Timoc (ROU)

5 August 1992; 17:30	Germany	7–7	Australia	Piscina Municipal de Montjuïc; Referees: Antal Vuszek (HUN), Manuel de Jesús (PUR)
5 August 1992; 17:30	Score by quarters: 1–2, 3–2, 1–0, 2–3			Piscina Municipal de Montjuïc; Referees: Antal Vuszek (HUN), Manuel de Jesús (PUR)
5 August 1992; 17:30	Dresel, Reimann 2	Goals	Clark, Wybrow 2	Piscina Municipal de Montjuïc; Referees: Antal Vuszek (HUN), Manuel de Jesús (PUR)

6 August 1992; 12:00	United States	7–2	Germany	Piscina Municipal de Montjuïc; Referees: Fred van Dorp (NED), Wim Keman (NED)
6 August 1992; 12:00	Score by quarters: 1–0, 2–0, 3–2, 1–0			Piscina Municipal de Montjuïc; Referees: Fred van Dorp (NED), Wim Keman (NED)
6 August 1992; 12:00	Fischer, Rousseau 2	Goals	Stamm, Reibel 1	Piscina Municipal de Montjuïc; Referees: Fred van Dorp (NED), Wim Keman (NED)

Classification round 5th-8th place

Pos	Team	Pld	W	D	L	GF	GA	GD	Pts
5	Australia	3	2	1	0	23	20	+3	5
6	Hungary	3	2	0	1	28	27	+1	4
7	Germany	3	1	1	1	24	21	+3	3
8	Cuba	3	0	0	3	22	29	−7	0

Source: https://www.olympedia.org/results/38777

8 August 1992; 17:30	Hungary	8–7	Germany	Piscinas Bernat Picornell; Referees: Miroslav Radenović (YUG), Roy Gunell (CAN)
8 August 1992; 17:30	Score by quarters: 2–3, 1–0, 3–2, 2–2			Piscinas Bernat Picornell; Referees: Miroslav Radenović (YUG), Roy Gunell (CAN)
8 August 1992; 17:30	Petőváry 3	Goals	Stamm 4	Piscinas Bernat Picornell; Referees: Miroslav Radenović (YUG), Roy Gunell (CAN)

9 August 1992; 11:30	Germany	10–6	Cuba	Piscinas Bernat Picornell; Referees: Eduard Prelovský (TCH), Wim Keman (NED)
9 August 1992; 11:30	Score by quarters: 2–2, 4–1, 1–1, 3–2			Piscinas Bernat Picornell; Referees: Eduard Prelovský (TCH), Wim Keman (NED)
9 August 1992; 11:30	Stamm 3	Goals	Barreras 2	Piscinas Bernat Picornell; Referees: Eduard Prelovský (TCH), Wim Keman (NED)

== Weightlifting ==
Athlete	Event	Snatch		Clean & jerk		Total	Rank
Athlete	Event	Result	Rank	Result	Rank	Total	Rank
Marco Spanehl	60 kg	117.5	14	150.0	11	267.5	13
Andreas Behm	67.5 kg	145.0	3	175.0	3	320.0	3rd place, bronze medalist(s)
Oliver Caruso	75 kg	145.0	14	180.0	14	325.0	16
Ingo Steinhöfel	75 kg	155.0	3	192.5	4	347.5	5
Marc Huster	82.5 kg	160.0	6	202.5	3	362.5	7
Udo Guse	100 kg	167.5	9	210.0	5	377.5	7
Frank Seipelt	110 kg	170.0	11	220.0	5	390.0	6
Ronny Weller	110 kg	192.5	2	240.0	1	432.5	1st place, gold medalist(s)
Manfred Nerlinger	+110 kg	180.0	4	232.5	3	412.5	3rd place, bronze medalist(s)
Martin Zawieja	+110 kg	170.0	7	210.0	10	380.0	9

== Wrestling ==
Greco-Roman

Athlete	Event	Group Stage							Final	
Athlete	Event	Opposition Result	Opposition Result	Opposition Result	Opposition Result	Opposition Result	Opposition Result	Rank	Opposition Result	Rank
Fuat Yildiz	48 kg	Ramírez (GUA); W 9–2	Pelikyan (BUL); W 3–1	Jiang (CHN); W 3–0	Simkhah (IRI); L 0–3	Maenza (ITA); L 0–13	—N/a	2	Sánchez (CUB); L 0–5	4
Olaf Brandt	52 kg	Ter-Mkrtchyan (EUN); L 0–13	Martínez (CUB); L 0–15	Did not advance				8	Did not advance	
Rifat Yildiz	57 kg	Lara (CUB); W 3–1	Ignatenko (EUN); W 6–5	Sike (HUN); W Fall	Mourier (FRA); W 6–0	Bye	—N/a	1	An (KOR); L 5–6	2nd place, silver medalist(s)
Mario Büttner	62 kg	Hu (CHN); W 8–7	Martynov (EUN); L 0–4	Bye	Lee (USA); L walkover	Did not advance		5	Arkoudeas (GRE); L walkover	10
Claudio Passarelli	68 kg	Kornbakk (SWE); W 1–0	Rodríguez (CUB); L 0–1	Bye	Chamangoli (IRI); L 0–1	Did not advance		5	Cărare (ROU); L walkover	10
Thomas Zander	82 kg	Park (KOR); W 5–2	Fredriksson (SWE); W 1–0	Farkas (HUN); L 0–1	Kasum (IOP); L DQ	Henderson (USA); W 6–0	—N/a	4	Frinta (TCH); W 3–1	7
Maik Bullmann	90 kg	Hussein (EGY); W 5–0	Naouar (TUN); W 16–0	Bye	Ljungberg (SWE); W 4–0	Babak (IRI); W 3–1	Bye	1	Başar (TUR); W 5–0	1st place, gold medalist(s)
Andreas Steinbach	100 kg	Govedarica (IOP); W 2–1	Sandoval (PAN); W 17–0	Növényi (HUN); W 4–1	Demyashkevich (EUN); L 0–2	Milián (CUB); L 4–10	—N/a	3	Ieremciuc (ROU); W 4–2	5

Freestyle

Athlete	Event	Group Stage						Final	
Athlete	Event	Opposition Result	Opposition Result	Opposition Result	Opposition Result	Opposition Result	Rank	Opposition Result	Rank
Reiner Heugabel	48 kg	Bye	Szostecki (POL); W 9–0	Sammari (TUN); W Fall	Kim (PRK); L Fall	Orujov (EUN); L 0–1	3	Vanni (USA); L 0–1	6
Jürgen Scheibe	57 kg	Šorov (IOP); W 6–2	Dorgu (NGR); W Fall	Bye	Kim (PRK); L 0–5	Smal (EUN); L 0–6	4	Dawson (CAN); W walkover	7
Karsten Polky	62 kg	du Plessis (RSA); W 5–3	Adachi (JPN); W 7–5	Smith (USA); L 0–6	Shin (KOR); L 2–5	Did not advance	5	Nieves (PUR); W Walkover	9
Georg Schwabenland	68 kg	Kõiv (EST); W 4–2	Athanasiadis (GRE); L DQ	Ko (KOR); L 0–3	Did not advance		7	Did not advance	
Alexander Leipold	74 kg	Park (KOR); L 2–8	Nagy (HUN); L 1–2	Did not advance			6	Did not advance	
Hans Gstöttner	82 kg	Sofiadi (BUL); W 3–2	Zhabrailov (EUN); L 1–2	Dvorák (HUN); W 4–2	Ghiță (ROU); W 6–3	Lohyňa (TCH); W 5–1	2	Khadem (IRI); L 0–6	4
Ludwig Schneider	90 kg	Bye	Limonta (CUB); L 0–10	Palatinus (TCH); W 2–0	Khadartsev (EUN); L 1–7	Lombardo (ITA); L 0–2	5	Deskoulidis (GRE); L 0–3	10
Heiko Balz	100 kg	Gholami (IRI); W 1–0	Bourdoulis (GRE); W 4–0	Aavik (EST); W 3–0	Kim (KOR); W 4–0	Coleman (USA); W 3–0	1	Khabelov (EUN); L 1–2	2nd place, silver medalist(s)
Andreas Schröder	130 kg	Gombos (HUN); W 4–0	Bye	Wang (CHN); W Fall	Gobejishvili (EUN); L 3–4	Baumgartner (USA); L 0–7	3	Soleimani (IRI); W walkover	5
