= Rüsselsheimer Ruder-Klub 08 =

Sports club in Rüsselsheim am Main, Germany

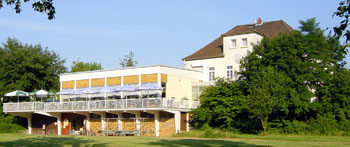
RRK 08 boathouse

The Rüsselsheimer Ruder-Klub 08 (Rüsselsheim rowing club 08), also known by its abbreviation RRK 08, is a sports club based in the German city of Rüsselsheim am Main. Originally a rowing club, the main sport has been hockey since the late 1960s. The other sport offered is tennis.

== History ==
The rowing club was founded in 1908. The first boat was a gig four, a German row boat type mostly used for training purposes. By 1919, i.e. just after World War I, the club had 182 members. A number of notable events occurred in 1925: the club house was built, women's rowing commences, and members start playing hockey during the winter months.

First founded in 1910 and re-founded in 1919, a second rowing club existed in Rüsselsheim: Rudergesellschaft Undine Rüsselsheim (RGUR). Both local rowing clubs stagnated during the 1930s; first due to the Great Depression and then due to sport becoming secondary in Nazi Germany. In 1938, the two clubs first formed a combined rowing eight and this led to the amalgamation of the two clubs in 1942, adopting the name of the older club. At the end of World War II, the club house was confiscated by the American Army and the club dissolved, as were all sports clubs in Allied-occupied Germany. The club was re-founded in April 1946. This was followed by a period where club rowers would often win the German rowing championships; to date 28 national titles have been won.

The next notable year was 1952: the American forces released the club's boat house, and the city built two hockey fields that gave this sport a boost. In 1968, the club's men's team won the national hockey championship. Since 1968, hockey is the dominant sport at RRK 08. The other sport offered by the club is tennis.

== Notable individuals ==
=== Hockey ===
- Britta Becker (1992 Olympic silver medallist)
- Tanja Dickenscheid (1992 Olympic silver medallist)
- Christian Domke (2003 Indoor Hockey World Cup world champion)
- Oliver Domke (1996 and 2000 Olympic competitor)
- Tobias Frank (double Olympic silver medallist – 1984 and 1988)
- Mandy Haase (2004 Olympic gold medallist)
- Eva Hagenbäumer (1992 Olympic silver medallist)
- Denise Klecker (2004 Olympic gold medallist)
- Peter Kraus (1972 Olympic gold medallist)
- Silke Müller (2004 Olympic gold medallist)
- Susanne Müller (1992 Olympic silver medallist)
- Christopher Reitz (1992 Olympic gold medallist)
- Fritz Schmidt (1972 Olympic gold medallist)
- Rainer Seifert (1972 Olympic gold medallist)
- Bianca Weiß (1992 Olympic silver medallist)

=== Rowing ===
- Georg von Opel (1912–1971) seven times German champion, sports administrator, member of the International Olympic Committee, son of Carl von Opel
