= Field hockey at the 1992 Summer Olympics =

Field hockey at the Games of the XXV Olympiad
- Venue: Estadi Olímpic de Terrassa
- Dates: 26 July – 8 August 1992
- No. of events: 2
- Competitors: 214 from 14 nations

The Field hockey at the 1992 Summer Olympics in Barcelona, Spain was held at the Estadi Olímpic de Terrassa in Terrassa from 26 July to 8 August 1992.

== Qualification ==
=== Men's qualification ===
Dates	Event	Location	Quotas	Qualifier(s)
—N/a	Hosts	—N/a	1	Spain
18 September – 1 October 1988	1988 Summer Olympics	Seoul, South Korea	1	Great Britain
12–23 February 1990	1990 World Cup	Lahore, Pakistan	1	Netherlands
23 September – 5 October 1990	1990 Asian Games	Beijing, China	1	Pakistan
12–23 June 1991	1991 European Championship	Paris, France	1	Germany
15–23 June 1991	1991 Oceania Qualification Tournament	Various	1	Australia
3–15 August 1991	1991 Pan American Games	Havana, Cuba	1	Argentina
20 September – 1 October 1991	1991 All-Africa Games	Cairo, Egypt	1	Egypt
12–27 October 1991	1991 Olympic Qualification Tournament	Auckland, New Zealand	4	Unified Team at the Olympics; India; Malaysia; New Zealand
Total			12	

=== Women's qualification ===
Dates	Event	Location	Quotas	Qualifier(s)
—N/a	Hosts	—N/a	1	Spain
21–30 September 1988	1988 Summer Olympics	Seoul, South Korea	1	Australia
2–13 May 1990	1990 World Cup	Sydney, Australia	1	Netherlands
27 July – 7 August 1991	1991 Olympic Qualifier	Auckland, New Zealand	5	Canada; Germany; Great Britain; New Zealand; South Korea
Total			8	

== Men's tournament ==
=== Preliminary round ===
==== Group A ====
Pos	Team	Pld	W	D	L	GF	GA	GD	Pts	Qualification
1	Australia	5	4	1	0	20	2	+18	9	Semi-finals
2	Germany	5	4	1	0	16	4	+12	9	Semi-finals
3	Great Britain	5	3	0	2	7	10	−3	6	5–8th place semi-finals
4	India	5	2	0	3	4	8	−4	4	5–8th place semi-finals
5	Argentina	5	1	0	4	3	12	−9	2	9–12th place semi-finals
6	Egypt	5	0	0	5	4	18	−14	0	9–12th place semi-finals

Source: FIH

==== Group B ====
Pos	Team	Pld	W	D	L	GF	GA	GD	Pts	Qualification
1	Pakistan	5	5	0	0	20	6	+14	10	Semi-finals
2	Netherlands	5	4	0	1	20	10	+10	8	Semi-finals
3	Spain (H)	5	3	0	2	15	11	+4	6	5–8th place semi-finals
4	New Zealand	5	1	0	4	8	11	−3	2	5–8th place semi-finals
5	CIS	5	1	0	4	11	21	−10	2	9–12th place semi-finals
6	Malaysia	5	1	0	4	9	24	−15	2	9–12th place semi-finals

Source: FIH
(H) Hosts

=== Medal round ===
Semi-finals
5 August
Australia	3
Netherlands	2
5 August
Germany	2
Pakistan	1

Gold medal match
8 August
Australia	1
Germany	2
Bronze medal match
8 August
Netherlands	3
Pakistan	4

=== Final standings ===
1. Germany
2. Australia
3. Pakistan
4. Netherlands
5. Spain
6. Great Britain
7. India
8. New Zealand
9. Malaysia
10. CIS
11. Argentina
12. Egypt

== Women's tournament ==
=== Preliminary round ===
==== Group A ====
Teams	Pld	W	D	L	GF	GA	GD	Pts
Germany	3	2	1	0	7	2	+5	5
Spain	3	2	1	0	5	3	+2	5
Australia	3	1	0	2	2	2	0	2
Canada	3	0	0	3	1	8	−7	0

==== Group B ====
Teams	Pld	W	D	L	GF	GA	GD	Pts
South Korea	3	2	0	1	8	3	+5	4
Great Britain	3	2	0	1	7	5	+2	4
Netherlands	3	2	0	1	4	3	+1	4
New Zealand	3	0	0	3	2	10	−8	0

=== Medal round ===
Semi-finals
4 August 1992
Germany	2
Great Britain	1
4 August 1992
South Korea	1
Spain	2

Final
7 August
Germany	1
Spain	2
Third place
7 August
Great Britain	4
South Korea	3

=== Final standings ===
1. Spain
2. Germany
3. Great Britain
4. South Korea
5. Australia
6. Netherlands
7. Canada
8. New Zealand

== Medal summary ==
=== Medal table ===
* Host nation (Spain)

Rank	Nation	Gold	Silver	Bronze	Total
1	Germany	1	1	0	2
2	Spain*	1	0	0	1
3	Australia	0	1	0	1
4	Great Britain	0	0	1	1
4	Pakistan	0	0	1	1
Totals (5 entries)		2	2	2	6

=== Medalists ===
Event	Gold	Silver	Bronze
Men's tournament	Germany; Michael Knauth; Christopher Reitz; Carsten Fischer; Jan-Peter Tewes; Volker Fried; Klaus Michler; Andreas Keller; Michael Metz; Christian Blunck; Sven Meinhardt; Michael Hilgers; Andreas Becker; Stefan Saliger; Stefan Tewes; Christian Mayerhöfer; Oliver Kurtz	Australia; John Bestall; Warren Birmingham; Lee Bodimeade; Ashley Carey; Gregory Corbitt; Stephen Davies; Damon Diletti; Lachlan Dreher; Lachlan Elmer; Dean Evans; Paul Lewis; Graham Reid; Jay Stacy; Michael York; David Wansbrough; Ken Wark	Pakistan; Tahir Zaman; Rana Mujahid Ali; Anjum Saeed; Muhammad Shahbaz; Muhammad Khalid; Farhad Hassan Khan; Shahid Ali Khan; Musaddiq Hussain; Muhammad Qamar Ibrahim; Khawaja Muhammad Junaid; Muhammad Asif Bajwa; Khalid Bashir; Wasim Feroz; Mansoor Ahmad; Shahbaz Ahmad; Muhammad Akhlaq Ahmad
Women's tournament	Spain; Anna Maiques; Celia Correa; Elisabeth Maragall; María Ángeles Rodríguez; María Carmen Barea; Marívi González; Maider Tellería; María Isabel Martínez; Mercedes Coghen; Nagore Gabellanes; Natalia Dorado; Nuria Olivé; Silvia Manrique; Sonia Barrio; Teresa Motos; Virginia Ramírez	Germany; Britta Becker; Tanja Dickenscheid; Nadine Ernsting-Krienke; Christine Ferneck; Eva Hagenbäumer; Franziska Hentschel; Caren Jungjohann; Katrin Kauschke; Irina Kuhnt; Heike Lätzsch; Susanne Müller; Tina Peters; Simone Thomaschinski; Bianca Weiß; Anke Wild; Susie Wollschläger	Great Britain; Joanne Thompson; Helen Morgan; Lisa Bayliss; Karen Brown; Mary Nevill; Jill Atkins; Vickey Dixon; Wendy Fraser; Sandy Lister; Jane Sixsmith; Alison Ramsay; Jackie McWilliams; Tammy Miller; Mandy Nicholls; Kathryn Johnson; Susan Fraser
