= Tina Peters =

Tina Peters may refer to:

- Tina Peters (politician) (born 1955), former Mesa County, Colorado, clerk and recorder, convicted of crimes related to 2020 election conspiracy theories
- Tina Peters (field hockey) (born 1968), German Olympian athlete
