= Paweł Olszewski =

Paweł Olszewski may refer to:

- Paweł Olszewski (politician)
- Paweł Olszewski (footballer)
- Pawel Olszewski (pentathlete)
