= Wrestling at the 1992 Summer Olympics – Men's Greco-Roman 100 kg =

Men's Greco-Roman 100 kg at the Games of the XXV Olympiad
- Venue: Institut Nacional d'Educació Física de Catalunya
- Dates: 26–28 July 1992
- Competitors: 16 from 16 nations

Medalists
1st place, gold medalist(s)		Héctor Milián	Cuba
2nd place, silver medalist(s)		Dennis Koslowski	United States
3rd place, bronze medalist(s)		Sergey Demyashkevich	Unified Team

The men's Greco-Roman 100 kilograms at the 1992 Summer Olympics as part of the wrestling program were held at the Institut Nacional d'Educació Física de Catalunya from July 26 to July 28. The wrestlers are divided into 2 groups. The winner of each group decided by a double-elimination system.

== Results ==
Legend

- DQ — Won by disqualification
- WO — Won by walkover

=== Elimination A ===
==== Round 1 ====
	Score		CP
Andrzej Wroński (POL)	0–2	Dennis Koslowski (USA)	0–3 PO
Stipe Damjanović (CRO)	0–7	Ion Ieremciuc (ROM)	0–3 PO
Song Sung-il (KOR)	3–0	Takashi Nonomura (JPN)	3–0 PO
Jörgen Olsson (SWE)	0–1	Helger Hallik (EST)	0–3 PO

==== Round 2 ====
	Score		CP
Andrzej Wroński (POL)	6–0	Stipe Damjanović (CRO)	3–0 PO
Dennis Koslowski (USA)	1–0	Song Sung-il (KOR)	3–0 PO
Ion Ieremciuc (ROM)	5–0	Takashi Nonomura (JPN)	3–0 PO
Helger Hallik (EST)		Bye	

- Jörgen Olsson (SWE) withdrew.

==== Round 3 ====
	Score		CP
Helger Hallik (EST)	0–2	Andrzej Wroński (POL)	0–3 PO
Dennis Koslowski (USA)	2–0	Ion Ieremciuc (ROM)	3–0 PO
Song Sung-il (KOR)		Bye	

==== Round 4 ====
	Score		CP
Song Sung-il (KOR)	3–4	Andrzej Wroński (POL)	1–3 PP
Helger Hallik (EST)	0–1	Dennis Koslowski (USA)	0–3 PO
Ion Ieremciuc (ROM)		Bye	

==== Round 5 ====
	Score		CP
Ion Ieremciuc (ROM)	0–0	Andrzej Wroński (POL)	0–0 D2
Dennis Koslowski (USA)		Bye	

==== Summary ====
Pos	Athlete	Pld	W	L	R	CP	TP
1	Dennis Koslowski (USA)	4	4	0	X (Note: Classification points: USA 6, POL 0, ROM 0; POL 0–0 ROM)	12	6
2	Andrzej Wroński (POL)	5	3	2	X	9	12
3	Ion Ieremciuc (ROM)	4	2	2	X	6	12
4	Song Sung-il (KOR)	3	1	2	4	4	6
5	Helger Hallik (EST)	3	1	2	4	3	1
—	Stipe Damjanović (CRO)	2	0	2	2	0	0
—	Takashi Nonomura (JPN)	2	0	2	2	0	0
—	Jörgen Olsson (SWE)	1	0	1	1	0	0

Source: Official Report

=== Elimination B ===
==== Round 1 ====
	Score		CP
Norbert Növényi (HUN)	5–0 Fall	Luis Sandoval (PAN)	4–0 TO
Miloš Govedarica (IOP)	1–2	Andreas Steinbach (GER)	1–3 PP
Sergey Demyashkevich (EUN)	0–1	Héctor Milián (CUB)	0–3 PO
Atanas Komchev (BUL)	2–0 Fall	Alioune Diouf (SEN)	4–0 TO

==== Round 2 ====
	Score		CP
Norbert Növényi (HUN)	1–3	Miloš Govedarica (IOP)	1–3 PP
Luis Sandoval (PAN)	0–17	Andreas Steinbach (GER)	0–4 ST
Sergey Demyashkevich (EUN)	4–0	Atanas Komchev (BUL)	3–0 PO
Héctor Milián (CUB)	0–0 DQ	Alioune Diouf (SEN)	4–0 EV

==== Round 3 ====
	Score		CP
Norbert Növényi (HUN)	1–4	Andreas Steinbach (GER)	1–3 PP
Miloš Govedarica (IOP)	1–7	Sergey Demyashkevich (EUN)	1–3 PP
Héctor Milián (CUB)	8–2	Atanas Komchev (BUL)	3–1 PP

==== Round 4 ====
	Score		CP
Andreas Steinbach (GER)	0–2	Sergey Demyashkevich (EUN)	0–3 PO
Héctor Milián (CUB)		Bye	
Miloš Govedarica (IOP)	WO	Atanas Komchev (BUL)	4–0 EF

- Atanas Komchev (BUL) and Miloš Govedarica (IOP) were tied on classification points for fifth.

==== Round 5 ====
	Score		CP
Héctor Milián (CUB)	10–4	Andreas Steinbach (GER)	3–1 PP
Sergey Demyashkevich (EUN)		Bye	

==== Summary ====
Pos	Athlete	Pld	W	L	R	CP	TP
1	Héctor Milián (CUB)	4	4	0	X (Note: Classification points: CUB 6, EUN 3, GER 1)	13	19
2	Sergey Demyashkevich (EUN)	4	3	1	X	9	13
3	Andreas Steinbach (GER)	5	3	2	X	11	27
4	Norbert Növényi (HUN)	3	1	2	3	6	7
5	Miloš Govedarica (IOP)	4	2	2	3	9	5
—	Atanas Komchev (BUL)	4	1	3	3	5	4
—	Luis Sandoval (PAN)	2	0	2	2	0	0
—	Alioune Diouf (SEN)	2	0	2	2	0	0

Source: Official Report

=== Finals ===
	Score		CP
9th place match
Helger Hallik (EST)	0–5	Miloš Govedarica (IOP)	0–3 PO
7th place match
Song Sung-il (KOR)	WO	Norbert Növényi (HUN)	0–4 EF
5th place match
Ion Ieremciuc (ROM)	2–4	Andreas Steinbach (GER)	1–3 PP
Bronze medal match
Andrzej Wroński (POL)	0–1	Sergey Demyashkevich (EUN)	0–3 PO
Gold medal match
Dennis Koslowski (USA)	1–2	Héctor Milián (CUB)	1–3 PP

== Final standing ==
Rank	Athlete
1st place, gold medalist(s)	Héctor Milián (CUB)
2nd place, silver medalist(s)	Dennis Koslowski (USA)
3rd place, bronze medalist(s)	Sergey Demyashkevich (EUN)
4	Andrzej Wroński (POL)
5	Andreas Steinbach (GER)
6	Ion Ieremciuc (ROM)
7	Norbert Növényi (HUN)
8	Song Sung-il (KOR)
9	Miloš Govedarica (IOP)
10	Helger Hallik (EST)
