= 1998 Men's Hockey Champions Trophy =

Field hockey tournament

Tournament details
- Host country: Pakistan
- City: Lahore
- Dates: 31 October – 8 November
- Teams: 6
- Venue: National Hockey Stadium

Final positions
- Champions: Netherlands (4th title)
- Runner-up: Pakistan
- Third place: Australia

Tournament statistics
- Matches played: 18
- Goals scored: 92 (5.11 per match)
- Top scorer(s): (Spain) Juan Escarré (Netherlands) Bram Lomans (7 goals)

The 1998 Men's Hockey Champions Trophy was the 20th edition of the Hockey Champions Trophy men's field hockey tournament. It took place from 31 October to 8 November 1998 at the National Hockey Stadium in Lahore, Pakistan.

== Results ==
All times are Pakistan Time (UTC+05:00)

=== Pool ===
Team	Pld	W	D	L	GF	GA	GD	Pts
Netherlands	5	4	0	1	19	10	+9	12
Pakistan	5	2	2	1	17	14	+3	8
Australia	5	2	2	1	11	10	+1	8
South Korea	5	2	2	1	14	15	−1	8
Spain	5	1	1	3	13	15	−2	4
Germany	5	0	1	4	7	17	−10	1

31 October 1998
10:05

Netherlands	3–2	Spain
Lomans 21'; Brinkman 29'; Eikelboom 44'	Report	Escarré 65'; Pujol 68'

31 October 1998
12:05

Australia	2–0	Germany
Vivian-Taylor 31'; Commens 41'	Report

31 October 1998
15:05

South Korea	4–3	Pakistan
Kim Yong-bae 15', 16'; Kang Keon-wook 45', 52'	Report	Sarwar 4', 35'; Ashraf 63'

1 November 1998
13:05

Germany	2–4	Netherlands
Emmerling 15'; Achtmann 27'	Report	Lomans 10'; Buma 11'; Geeris 20'; Eikelboom 30'

1 November 1998
15:05

Pakistan	2–2	Spain
Abbas 55'; Babar 63'	Report	Sánchez 58'; Escarré 69'

2 November 1998
15:05

South Korea	1–1	Australia
Kim Young-kyu 24'	Report	Elder 60'

3 November 1998
10:05

Germany	1–5	Spain
Mayerhöfer 39'	Report	Escarré 22', 29'; Arnau 43', 51'; Amat 53'

3 November 1998
13:05

Pakistan	4–4	Australia
Iqbal 35'; Bashir 60', 68'; Abbas 64'	Report	Livermore 9'; Stacy 12', 40'; Elder 66'

3 November 1998
15:05

Netherlands	5–0	South Korea
Geeris 30', 41'; De Nooijer 45'; Van Wijk 48'; Eikelboom 69'	Report

4 November 1998
15:05

Pakistan	5–3	Netherlands
Bashir 21'; Anis 24', 61'; Sarwar 38'; Abbas 53'	Report	Eikelboom 25'; Lomans 41', 64'

5 November 1998
11:05

Spain	1–3	Australia
Arnau 32'	Report	Vivian-Taylor 12'; Webster 30'; Stacy 48'

5 November 1998
13:05

Germany	3–3	South Korea
Gemmrig 8', 59'; Kurtz 30'	Report	Song Seung-tae 4', 49'; Kim Jung-chul 35'

6 November 1998
09:05

Australia	1–4	Netherlands
Commens 61'	Report	Van Wijk 21'; Lomans 33', 39'; Eikelboom 51'

6 November 1998
11:05

Spain	3–6	South Korea
Casas 49'; Escarré 53', 56'	Report	Kang Keon-wook 35'; Yoo Moon-ki 45'; Yeo Woon-kon 47'; Song Seung-tae 51'; Kim Young-kyu 65', 70'

6 November 1998
15:05

Pakistan	3–1	Germany
Hussain 12'; Abbas 55'; Bashir 68'	Report	Kurtz 32'

=== Classification ===
==== Fifth and sixth place ====
8 November 1998
09:05

Germany	2–3 (a.e.t.)	Spain
Achtmann 27'; Reinelt 63'	Report	Escarré 7'; Ribas 69'; Pujol 77'

Umpires:
Jos Gorissen (NED)
Murray Grime (AUS)

==== Third and fourth place ====
8 November 1998
11:35

Australia	1–1	South Korea
Stacy 27'	Report	Song Seung-tae 61'
Penalties
Commens (penalty shoot-out scored); Elder (penalty shoot-out scored); Livermore (penalty shoot-out scored); Vivian-Taylor (penalty shoot-out scored); Elmer (penalty shoot-out scored) ————— Commens (penalty shoot-out missed); Elder (penalty shoot-out scored); Livermore (penalty shoot-out scored); Vivian-Taylor (penalty shoot-out scored)	8–7	(penalty shoot-out scored) Kim Yong-bae; (penalty shoot-out scored) Hong Kyung-suep; (penalty shoot-out scored) Yeo Woon-kon; (penalty shoot-out scored) Kang Keon-wook; (penalty shoot-out scored) Park Shin-heum ————— (penalty shoot-out missed) Kim Yong-bae; (penalty shoot-out scored) Park Shin-heum; (penalty shoot-out scored) Yeo Woon-kon; (penalty shoot-out missed) Hong Kyung-suep

Umpires:
Edmundo Saladino (ARG)
Pedro Teixeira (POR)

==== Final ====
8 November 1998
15:05

Pakistan	1–3	Netherlands
Bashir 12'	Report	Lomans 21'; Geeris 32'; Eikelboom 68'

== Awards ==
Topscorers	Player of the Tournament	Fair Play Trophy
(Spain) Juan Escarré (Netherlands) Bram Lomans (7 goals)	(Pakistan) Atif Bashir	South Korea

== Final standings ==
1. Netherlands
2. Pakistan
3. Australia
4. South Korea
5. Spain
6. Germany
