= Jörgen Olsson (wrestler) =

Swedish wrestler (born 1968)

Personal information
- Nationality: Swedish
- Born: 8 December 1968 (age 57) Malmö, Sweden

Sport
- Sport: Wrestling

Jörgen Olsson (born 8 December 1968) is a Swedish wrestler. He competed in the men's Greco-Roman 100 kg at the 1992 Summer Olympics.
