= Anke Wild =

German field hockey player (born 1967)

Personal information
- Born: 12 October 1967 (age 58) Rüsselsheim, Hessen, West Germany
Medal record
Women's field hockey
Representing Germany
Olympic Games
Silver medal – second place	1992 Barcelona	Team competition
Champions Trophy
Silver medal – second place	1991 Berlin	Team competition

Anke Wild (born 12 October 1967) is a former field hockey player from Germany, who was a member of the Women's National Team that won the silver medal at the 1992 Summer Olympics in Barcelona, Spain.

She was temporarily allied with the former field hockey player and Olympic gold medalist Andreas Keller, who is also the father of her two older children Felix and Luca.
