= Matthias Hahn =

German handball player (born 1965)

Personal information
- Nationality: German
- Born: 10 January 1965 (age 61) Warnemünde, East Germany
- Height: 196 cm (77 in)

Sport
- Sport: Handball
- Position: pivot

Senior clubs
- Years: Team
- 1984-1990: SC Empor Rostock
- 1990-1994: SG VfL/BHW Hameln
- 1994-2004: SG Flensburg-Handewitt
National team
Years	Team	Apps	(Gls)
1986-1990	East Germany	55	(125)
1990-?	Germany	56	(125)

Matthias Hahn (born 10 January 1965) is a German former handball player and coach. He competed at the 1988 Summer Olympics, representing East Germany, and the 1992 Summer Olympics representing the recently unified German team. Since 2018 he has been a youth coach at SG Flensburg-Handewitt.
