= Michael Knauth =

German field hockey player

Olympic medal record

Men's field hockey

Representing Germany
Gold medal – first place	1992 Barcelona	Team competition

Michael Knauth (born 24 June 1965, in Wolfsburg) is a German former field hockey player who competed in the 1992 Summer Olympics and in the 1996 Summer Olympics.
