= Rita Köster =

German handball player (born 1960)

Rita Forst (née Köster 19 December 1960 in Oldenburg, Germany) is a German handball player. She participated at the 1992 Summer Olympics, where the German national team placed fourth.

At club level she played her entire career for VfL Oldenburg from 1979 to 1992.
