= Margit Schreib =

German synchronized swimmer

Personal information
- Nationality: Germany
- Born: 11 May 1971 (age 55) Steyr, Austria
- Height: 5 ft 9 in (175 cm)
- Weight: 61 kg (134 lb)

Sport
- Sport: Swimming
- Strokes: Synchronized swimming
- Club: DSV München
- Updated on 21 May 2015

Margit Schreib (born 20 January 1967) is a former synchronized swimmer from Germany. She competed in the women's solo and women's duet competitions at the 1992 Summer Olympics.
