= Anja Krüger =

German handball player (born 1964)

Anja Krüger (married Schneider, born 20 March 1964 in Berlin, DDR) is a German handball player. She participated at the 1992 Summer Olympics, where the German national team placed fourth. At the World Cup in 1990 in South Korea, she won the bronze medal and was chosen in the allstar-team of this world cup. With her home club SC Leipzig she won the European cup two times (1986, 1992)
