= Ion Ieremciuc =

Romanian wrestler

Personal information
- Nationality: Romanian
- Born: 23 June 1967 (age 59) Suceava, Romania

Sport
- Sport: Wrestling

Ion Ieremciuc (born 23 June 1967) is a Romanian wrestler. He competed in the men's Greco-Roman 100 kg at the 1992 Summer Olympics.
