= Michael Hilgers =

German field hockey player

Olympic medal record

Men's Field Hockey

Representing West Germany
Silver medal – second place	1988 Seoul	Team competition

Representing Germany
Gold medal – first place	1992 Barcelona	Team competition

Michael Hilgers (born 6 August 1966) is a former field hockey forward from Germany, who won the silver medal at the 1988 Summer Olympics. Four years later, when Barcelona, Spain hosted the Summer Olympics, he was a member of the Men's National Team that captured the gold medal. Playing club hockey for Gladbacher HTC during his career, he later on became the chief-executive of the Warsteiner HockeyPark in Mönchengladbach, which hosted the 2006 Men's Hockey World Cup.
