= Miloš Govedarica =

Yugoslav wrestler (born 1964)

Personal information
- Nationality: Yugoslav
- Born: 15 May 1964 (age 62)

Sport
- Sport: Wrestling

Miloš Govedarica (born 15 May 1964) is a Yugoslav wrestler. He competed in the men's Greco-Roman 100 kg at the 1992 Summer Olympics.
