= Hendrik Ochel =

German handball player (born 1969)

Personal information
- Nationality: German
- Born: 26 February 1969 (age 57) Kiel, West Germany
- Height: 197 cm (78 in)

Sport
- Sport: Handball
- Position: Right back

Senior clubs
- Years: Team
- -1986: MTSV Schwabing
- 1986-1993: TSV Milbertshofen
- 1993-1994: SG Hameln
- 1994-1995: THW Kiel
- 1995-1996: GWD Minden
National team
Years	Team	Apps	(Gls)
1989-1996	Germany	44	(104)

Hendrik Ochel (born 26 February 1969) is a German male handball player. He was a member of the Germany men's national handball team. He was part of the team at the 1992 Summer Olympics. On club level he played for TSV Milbertshofen in München, MTSV Schwabing in Bavaria, THW Kiel in Schleswig-Holstein and SG Hameln in Niedersachsen. He won the 1995 Handball-Bundesliga with THW Kiel.
