= Christopher Reitz =

German field hockey player (born 1973)

Personal information
- Born: 3 April 1973 (age 53) Frankfurt am Main, Hessen, West Germany
Medal record
Men's field hockey
Representing Germany
Olympic Games
Gold medal – first place	1992 Barcelona	Team
World Cup
Bronze medal – third place	1998 Utrecht	Team

Christopher Reitz (born 3 April 1973 in Frankfurt am Main, Hessen) is a German field hockey goalkeeper, who represented Germany in the 1992, 1996 and 2000 Summer Olympics. He is now an orthopaedic surgeon in Gold Coast, Australia.

== International senior tournaments ==
- 1992 – Summer Olympics, Barcelona (1st place)
- 1994 – Champions Trophy, Lahore (2nd place)
- 1994 – Hockey World Cup, Sydney (4th place)
- 1995 – European Nations Cup, Dublin (1st place)
- 1995 – Champions Trophy, Berlin (1st place)
- 1996 – Summer Olympics, Atlanta (4th place)
- 1996 – Champions Trophy, Madras (3rd place)
- 1997 – Champions Trophy, Adelaide (1st place)
- 1998 – World Hockey Cup, Utrecht (3rd place)
- 1998 – Champions Trophy, Lahore (6th place)
- 1999 – European Indoor Nations Cup, Slagelse (1st place)
- 1999 – European Nations Cup, Padova (1st place)
- 2000 – Champions Trophy, Amstelveen (2nd place)
- 2000 – Summer Olympics, Sydney (5th place)
- 2001 – Champions Trophy, Rotterdam (1st place)
