= Caren Jungjohann =

German field hockey player

Personal information
- Born: 23 December 1967 (age 58) Duisburg, Nordrhein-Westfalen, West Germany
Medal record
Women's field hockey
Olympic Games
Representing Germany
Silver medal – second place	1992 Barcelona	Team competition
Champions Trophy
Representing West Germany
Bronze medal – third place	1989 Frankfurt	Team competition

Caren Jungjohann (born 23 December 1967 in Duisburg, Nordrhein-Westfalen) is a former field hockey player from Germany, who was a member of the Women's National Team that won the silver medal at the 1992 Summer Olympics in Barcelona, Spain. She competed in two consecutive Summer Olympics for her native country, starting in 1988 for West Germany.
