= Sergey Demyashkevich =

Belarusian wrestler (born 1966)

Medal record

Men's Greco-Roman wrestling

Representing the Unified Team

Olympic Games
Bronze medal – third place	1992 Barcelona	100 kg

Representing the Soviet Union

World Championships
Gold medal – first place	1990 Ostia	100 kg
Bronze medal – third place	1991 Varna	100 kg

Sergey Demyashkevich (born 28 August 1966) is a Belarusian former wrestler who competed in the 1992 Summer Olympics.
