= Reibel Guido =

German water polo player

Personal information
- Nationality: German
- Born: 7 December 1968 (age 56); Krefeld, West Germany

Sport
- Sport: Water polo

Reibel Guido (born 7 December 1968) is a German former water polo player. He competed in the men's tournament at the 1992 Summer Olympics.
