= Susie Wollschläger =

German field hockey player

Personal information
- Born: 5 May 1967 (age 59)
Medal record
Women's field hockey
Representing Germany
Olympic Games
Silver medal – second place	1992 Barcelona	Team competition

Susanne Wollschläger (born 5 May 1967 in Duisburg, Nordrhein-Westfalen) is a former field hockey goalkeeper from Germany, who was a member of the Women's National Team that won the silver medal at the 1992 Summer Olympics in Barcelona, Spain. She competed in three consecutive Summer Olympics, starting in 1988 (Seoul, South Korea) for West Germany.
