= Christine Ferneck =

German field hockey player

Personal information
- Full name: Christine Stephanie Ferneck
- Born: 29 April 1968 (age 58) Munich, Bayern, West Germany
Medal record
Women's field hockey
Representing Germany
Olympic Games
Silver medal – second place	1992 Barcelona	Team competition

Christine Stephanie Ferneck (born 29 April 1968 in Munich, Bayern) is a former field hockey player from Germany, who was a member of the national squad that won the silver medal at the 1992 Summer Olympics in Barcelona. She competed in two consecutive Summer Olympics for her native country, starting in 1988 for West Germany.
