= Luis Sandoval (wrestler) =

Panamanian wrestler

Personal information
- Nationality: Panamanian
- Born: 15 July 1962 (age 64)

Sport
- Sport: Wrestling

Luis Sandoval (born 15 July 1962) is a Panamanian wrestler. He competed in the men's Greco-Roman 100 kg at the 1992 Summer Olympics.
