= Michael Klemm =

German handball player (born 1965)

Personal information
- Nationality: German
- Born: 13 June 1965 (age 61) Duisburg
- Height: 185 cm (73 in)

Sport
- Sport: Handball
- Position: Centreback

Senior clubs
- Years: Team
- ?-1997: TSV Bayer Dormagen
National team
Years	Team	Apps	(Gls)
1987-1997	Germany	110	(146)
- Updated on 2009

Michael Klemm (born 13 June 1965) is a German former handball player. He was a member of the Germany men's national handball team. He was part of the team at the 1992 Summer Olympics, playing four matches. On club level he played for TSV Bayer Dormagen in Duisburg. He is noted for being selected for the German national team, even when playing in the Second Bundesliga.
