= Stephan Hauck =

German handball player (born 1961)

Personal information
- Nationality: German
- Born: 17 August 1961 (age 63); Merseburg, East Germany

Sport
- Sport: Handball

Stephan Hauck (born 17 August 1961) is a German former handball player. He competed at the 1988 Summer Olympics and the 1992 Summer Olympics.
