= Raúl de la Peña =

German water polo player

Personal information
- Nationality: German
- Born: 22 February 1966 (age 59); Mexico City, Mexico

Sport
- Sport: Water polo

Raúl de la Peña (born 22 February 1966) is a German water polo player. He competed at the 1992 Summer Olympics and the 1996 Summer Olympics.
