= Carsten Kusch =

German water polo player

Personal information
- Nationality: German
- Born: 4 January 1967 (age 59) Berlin, Germany

Sport
- Sport: Water polo

Carsten Kusch (born 4 January 1967) is a German water polo player. He competed in the men's tournament at the 1992 Summer Olympics.
