= Andreas Keller =

German field hockey player (born 1965)

Personal information
- Born: 1 October 1965 (age 60) West Berlin, West Germany
Medal record
Men's Field Hockey
Olympic Games
Representing West Germany
Silver medal – second place	1984 Los Angeles	Team
Silver medal – second place	1988 Seoul	Team
Representing Germany
Gold medal – first place	1992 Barcelona	Team

Andreas Keller (born 1 October 1965) is a former field hockey player from West Germany, who competed at three Summer Olympics for his native country. He won the gold medal with Germany at the 1992 Summer Olympics in Barcelona, after securing silver at the two previous Olympics in Los Angeles (1984) and Seoul (1988), with West Germany.

The former striker and goalgetter is related to German female hockey star Natascha Keller, who won the gold medal at the 2004 Summer Olympics; he is her older brother. Their younger brother Florian Keller won hockey gold at the 2008 Summer Olympics. Their father Carsten for his sake captured the gold medal in field hockey at the 1972 Summer Olympics in Munich, while their grandfather Erwin won a silver medal in the same sport at the 1936 Summer Olympics in Berlin.

Andreas Keller was temporarily allied with the hockey silver medalist Anke Wild, who is also the mother of his two older children Felix and Luca.
