= Bianca Weiß =

German field hockey player (born 1968)

Medal record

Women's field hockey

Representing Germany

Olympic Games
| Silver medal – second place | 1992 Barcelona | Team competition |

Champions Trophy
| Silver medal – second place | 1991 Berlin | Team competition |

Bianca Weiß (born 24 January 1968) is a former field hockey goalkeeper from Germany, who was a member of the Women's National Team that won the silver medal at the 1992 Summer Olympics in Barcelona, Spain.
