= Jan-Peter Tewes =

German field hockey player

Personal information
- Born: 20 November 1968 (age 57) Mülheim an der Ruhr, West Germany

Sport
- Sport: Field hockey
- Position: Defender
Senior career
Years	Team	Caps	Goals
–	Uhlenhorst Mülheim	-	-
–	Club an der Alster	-	-
National team
Years	Team	Caps	Goals
1992–1997	Germany	154	-
Medal record
Men's Field Hockey
Representing Germany
Olympic Games
Gold medal – first place	1992 Barcelona	Team
World Cup
Bronze medal – third place	1998 Utrecht	Team
Champions Trophy
Gold medal – first place	1992 Karachi	Team
Gold medal – first place	1995 Berlin	Team
Gold medal – first place	1997 Adelaide	Team
Silver medal – second place	1994 Lahore	Team
Bronze medal – third place	1996 Madras	Team

Jan-Peter Tewes (born 20 November 1968 in Mülheim an der Ruhr, Nordrhein-Westfalen) is a former field hockey defender from Germany, who won the gold medal with the Men's National Team at the 1992 Summer Olympics in Barcelona, Spain. His older brother Stefan (born 1967) was also on that winning side. Tewes also competed at the 1996 Summer Olympics in Atlanta, United States, where he finished 4th.
