= Pawel Olszewski (pentathlete) =

German modern pentathlete

Personal information
- Born: 2 March 1962 (age 64) Krotoszyn, Poland

Sport
- Sport: Modern pentathlon

Pawel Olszewski (born 2 March 1962) is a German modern pentathlete. He competed at the 1992 Summer Olympics.
