= Susanne Müller (field hockey) =

German field hockey player (born 1972)

Personal information
- Born: 12 May 1972 (age 54) Hanau, Hesse, Germany
- Height: 169 cm (5 ft 7 in)
Medal record
Women's field hockey
Representing Germany
Olympic Games
Silver medal – second place	1992 Barcelona	Team competition
Champions Trophy
Silver medal – second place	1991 Berlin	Team competition
Silver medal – second place	1997 Berlin	Team competition
Bronze medal – third place	1993 Amstelveen	Team competition

Susanne Müller (born 12 May 1972) is a former field hockey player from Germany, who was a member of the Women's National Team that won the silver medal at the 1992 Summer Olympics in Barcelona, Spain.
