= Eva Hagenbäumer =

German field hockey player

Medal record

Women's field hockey

Representing Germany

Olympic Games
Silver medal – second place	1992 Barcelona	Team competition

Champions Trophy
Bronze medal – third place	1993 Amstelveen	Team competition

European Nations Cup
Bronze medal – third place	1995 Amstelveen	Team competition

Eva Hagenbäumer (born 5 January 1967 in Wiesbaden, Hessen) is a former field hockey player from Germany, who was a member of the national squad that won the silver medal at the 1992 Summer Olympics in Barcelona, Spain. She competed in two consecutive Summer Olympics for her native country, starting in 1992.
