= Klaus Michler =

German field hockey player (born 1970)

Personal information
- Born: 15 May 1970 (age 56) Stuttgart, West Germany

Sport
- Sport: Field hockey
Senior career
Years	Team	Caps	Goals
–	Crefeld	-	-
National team
Years	Team	Caps	Goals
1991–1998	Germany		-
Medal record
Men's field hockey
Representing Germany
Olympic Games
Gold medal – first place	1992 Barcelona	Team
World Cup
Bronze medal – third place	1998 Utrecht	Team
Champions Trophy
Gold medal – first place	1991 Berlin	Team
Gold medal – first place	1992 Karachi	Team
Gold medal – first place	1995 Berlin	Team
Silver medal – second place	1994 Lahore	Team
Bronze medal – third place	1996 Madras	Team

Klaus Michler (born 15 May 1970 in Stuttgart) is a German former field hockey player who competed in the 1992 Summer Olympics and in the 1996 Summer Olympics.
