= Stefan Tewes =

German field hockey player

Personal information
- Born: 24 November 1967 (age 58)
Medal record
Men's Field Hockey
Representing Germany
Olympic Games
Gold medal – first place	1992 Barcelona	Team competition

Stefan Tewes (born 24 November 1967 in Mülheim an der Ruhr, Nordrhein-Westfalen) is a former field hockey player from Germany, who won the gold medal with the Men's National Team at the 1992 Summer Olympics in Barcelona, Spain. His younger brother Jan-Peter (born 1968) was also on that winning side.

== See also ==
- Coffee Fellows
