= Michael Metz =

German field hockey player

Olympic medal record

Men's Field Hockey
Silver medal – second place	1988 Seoul	Team competition
Gold medal – first place	1992 Barcelona	Team competition

Michael Metz (born 16 June 1964) is a former field hockey player from Germany, who won the silver medal at the 1988 Summer Olympics in Seoul, South Korea for West Germany. Four years later, when Barcelona, Spain hosted the Summer Olympics, he was a member of the Men's National Team that captured the gold medal.
