= Tina Peters (field hockey) =

German field hockey player

Personal information
- Born: 24 March 1968 (age 58) Münster, Nordrhein-Westfalen, West Germany
Medal record
Women's field hockey
Representing Germany
Olympic Games
Silver medal – second place	1992 Barcelona	Team competition

Kristina "Tina" Peters (born 24 March 1968) is a former field hockey player from Germany.

Peters was a member of the Women's National Team that won the silver medal at the 1992 Summer Olympics in Barcelona, Spain. A player from hockey club RTHC Bayer Leverkusen, she competed in two consecutive Summer Olympics, starting in 1992.
