= Oliver Kurtz =

German field hockey player

Olympic medal record

Men's Field Hockey
Gold medal – first place	1992 Barcelona	Team competition

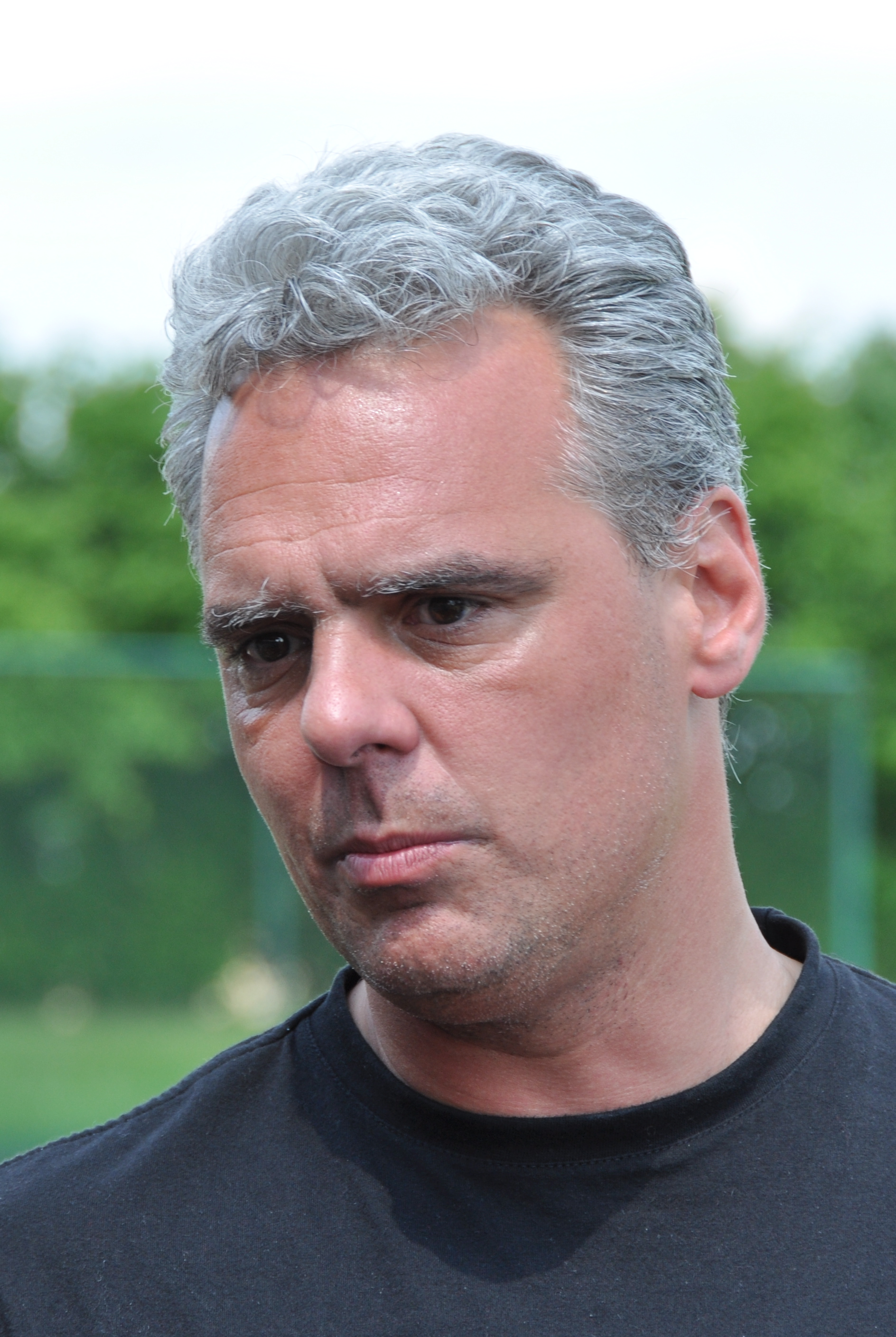
Oliver Kurtz at GHTC 2012

Oliver Kurtz (born 23 October 1971) is a former field hockey forward from Germany, who won the gold medal with the Men's National Team at the 1992 Summer Olympics in Barcelona, Spain. Kurtz was caught for a doping offence in 1987.
