= Czechoslovakia at the 1992 Summer Olympics =

- IOC code: TCH
- NOC: Czechoslovak Olympic Committee

in Barcelona
- Competitors: 208 (146 men and 62 women) in 25 sports
- Flag bearer: Jozef Lohyňa
- Medals Ranked 15th: Gold 4 Silver 2 Bronze 1 Total 7

Summer Olympics appearances (overview)
- 1920; 1924; 1928; 1932; 1936; 1948; 1952; 1956; 1960; 1964; 1968; 1972; 1976; 1980; 1984; 1988; 1992

Other related appearances
- Bohemia (1900–1912); Czech Republic (1994–pres.); Slovakia (1994–pres.)

The Czech and Slovak Federative Republic (informally known as Czechoslovakia) competed as a nation for the last time at the 1992 Summer Olympics in Barcelona, Spain. After the dissolution of Czechoslovakia at the end of 1992, the Czech Republic and Slovakia would compete as independent nations at the 1996 Summer Olympics. 208 competitors, 146 men and 62 women, took part in 121 events in 25 sports.

== Medalists ==
Medal	Name	Sport	Event	Date
Gold	Lukáš Pollert	Canoeing	Men's slalom C-1	1 August
Gold	Petr Hrdlička	Shooting	Trap	2 August
Gold	Robert Změlík	Athletics	Men's decathlon	6 August
Gold	Jan Železný	Athletics	Men's javelin throw	8 August
Silver	Václav Chalupa	Rowing	Men's single sculls	1 August
Silver	Jiří Rohan; Miroslav Šimek	Canoeing	Men's slalom C-2	2 August
Bronze	Luboš Račanský	Shooting	Men's 10 metre running target	1 August

== Competitors ==
The following is the list of number of competitors in the Games.

Sport	Men	Women	Total
Archery	1	0	1
Athletics	14	4	18
Badminton	1	1	2
Basketball	0	12	12
Boxing	4	–	4
Canoeing	20	7	27
Cycling	12	0	12
Diving	0	1	1
Equestrian	1	0	1
Fencing	5	0	5
Gymnastics	2	5	7
Handball	16	0	16
Judo	4	1	5
Modern pentathlon	3	–	3
Rowing	18	13	31
Sailing	1	2	3
Shooting	13	4	17
Swimming	3	5	8
Synchronized swimming	–	1	1
Table tennis	3	2	5
Tennis	1	4	5
Water polo	12	–	12
Weightlifting	5	–	5
Wrestling	7	–	7
Total	146	62	208

== Archery ==
Czechoslovakia's second archery appearance came twelve years after its first. Only one man competed for Czechoslovakia, not advancing to the elimination rounds.

Men's Individual Competition:

- Martin Hámor – Ranking round (did not advance – 65th place)

== Athletics ==
Men's 110m Hurdles

- Igor Kováč
  - Heat — 14.12s (→ did not advance)

Men's 400m Hurdles

- Jozef Kucej
  - Heat — 50.28s (→ did not advance)

Men's Marathon

- Karel David — 2:16:34 (→ 19th place)

Men's Long Jump

- Milan Gombala
  - Heat — 7.69 m (→ did not advance)

Men's Triple Jump

- Milan Mikuláš
  - Heat — 16.82 m (→ did not advance)

Men's Discus Throw

- Imrich Bugár
  - Heat — 58.70 m (→ did not advance)

Men's Javelin Throw

- Jan Železný
  - Final — 89.66m (→ Gold Medal)

Men's Hammer Throw

- Pavel Sedláček
  - Heat — 67.76 m (→ did not advance)

Men's 20 km Walk

- Pavol Blažek – 1:29:23 (→ 17th place)
- Igor Kollár – 1:29:38 (→ 19th place)
- Jan Záhončík – 1:33:37 (→ 28th place)

Men's 50 km Walk

- Roman Mrázek – 3:55:21 (→ 5th place)
- Pavol Szikora – 4:17:49 (→ 27th place)
- Pavol Blažek – 4:22:33 (→ 29th place)

Men's Decathlon

- Robert Změlík — 8.611 points (→ Gold Medal)

Women's Marathon

- Alena Peterková – 2:53:30 (→ 25th place)

Women's High Jump

- Šárka Kašpárková
  - Heat — 1.88m (→ did not advance)
- Šárka Nováková
  - Heat — 1.83m (→ did not advance)

Women's Discus Throw

- Vladimíra Malátová
  - Heat — 59.04m (→ did not advance)

== Badminton ==
Men

- Tomasz mendrek – Round of 32 (lost to Foo Kok Keong MAS 0–2)

Women

- Eva Lacinová – Round of 64 (lost to Doris Piche CAN 0–2)

== Basketball ==
=== Women's team competition ===
- Preliminary round (group B)
  - Lost to United States (55–111)
  - Lost to Spain (58–59)
  - Lost to China (70–72)
- Classification Matches
  - 5th-8th place: Defeated Brazil (74–62)
  - 5th-6th place: Lost to Spain (58–59) → Sixth place
- Team Roster
  - Iveta Bielikova
  - Martina Luptakova
  - Ana Janostinova
  - Eva Nemcova
  - Ana Chupikova
  - Eva Antalecova
  - Renata Hirakova
  - Adriana Chamajova
  - Erika Burianova
  - Kamila Vodickova
  - Milena Razgova
  - Eva Berkova

== Boxing ==
Flyweight (51 kg)

- Stanislav Vagaský – Round of 32 (lost to Isidrio Visvera PHI)

Middleweight (75 kg)

- Michal franek – Round of 32 (lost to Lee Seung-Bae KOR)

Heavyweight (91 kg)

- Vojtěch Rückschloss – Quarterfinals (lost to David Tua NZL rsc – 5th place)

Super Heavyweight (+91 kg)

- Peter Hrivňák – Quarterfinals (lost to Brian Nielsen DEN 4-14 – 5th place)

== Canoeing ==
=== Flatwater ===
K1 – 500 m men

- Attila Szabó – semifinal (did not advance)

K2 – 500 m men

- Juraj Kadnár, Róbert Erban – semifinal (did not advance)

C1 – 500 m men

- Slavomír Kňazovický – final: 1:54.51 (4th place)

C2 – 500 m men

- Jan Bartůněk, Waldemar Fibigr – final: 1:44.70 (8th place)

K1 – 1000 m men

- Róbert Erban – semifinal (did not advance)

K2 – 1000 m men

- René Kučera, Petr Hruška – final: 3:23.12 (7th place)

K4 – 1000 m men

- Jozef Turza, Juraj Kadnár, Róbert Erban, Attila Szabó – final: 2:57.06 (4th place)

C1 – 1000 m men

- Jan Bartůněk – final: 4:15,25 (8th place)

C2 – 1000 m men

- Jan Bartůněk, Waldemar Fibigr – final: 1:44,70 (8th place)

K2 – 500 m women

- Jobánková, Janáčková – semifinal (did not advance)

K4 – 500 m women

- Jobánková, Janáčková, Havelková, Vokurková – semifinal (did not advance)

=== Water slalom ===
K1 men

- Luboš Hilgert – 116.63 (23rd place)
- Pavel Prindiš – 117.60 (24th place)

C1 men

- Lukáš Pollert – 113.69 (gold medal)
- Jakub Prüher – 151.85 (26th place)

C2 men

- Miroslav Šimek, Jiří Rohan – 124.25 (silver medal)
- Petr Štercl, Pavel Štercl – 130.42 (6th place)
- Jan Petříček, Tomáš Petříček – 131.86 (7th place)

K1 women

- Zdenka Grossmannová – 135.79 (5th place)
- Štěpánka Hilgertová – 141.43 (12th place)
- Marcela Sadilová – 150.38 (20th place)

== Cycling ==
Twelve cyclists, all men, represented Czechoslovakia in 1992.

=== Road cycling ===
Men's road race

- František Trkal – 25th place
- Miloslav Kejval – 27th place
- Pavel Padrnos – 69th place

Men's team time trial

- Czechoslovakia – 2:06:44 (8th place)
  - Jaroslav Bílek
  - Miroslav Lipták
  - Pavel Padrnos
  - František Trkal

=== Track cycling ===
Men's sprint

- Jaroslav Jeřábek – 13th place

Men's individual pursuit

- Michal Baldrián – 14th place

Men's team pursuit

- Czechoslovakia – 8th place
  - Jan Panáček
  - Pavel Tesař
  - Rudolf Juřícký
  - Svatopluk Buchta

Men's points race

- Lubor Tesař – 5th place

== Diving ==
Women's 3m Springboard

- Heidemarie Bártová
  - Preliminary Round — 286.14 points
  - Final — 491.49 points (→ 4th place)

== Equestrianism ==
Showjumping

- Jiří Pecháček, Garta – withdrew due to horse's illness in qualification round

== Fencing ==
Five male fencers represented Czechoslovakia in 1992.

Men's épée

- Aleš Depta – 16th place
- Jiří Douba – 21st place
- Roman Ječmínek – 35th place

Men's team épée

- Czechoslovakia – preliminary group: 2 losses (did not advance, 9th place)
  - Aleš Depta
  - Jiří Douba
  - Roman Ječmínek
  - Michal Franc
  - Tomáš Kubíček

== Gymnastics ==
Two men and three Czechoslovak women participated in the artistic gymnastics competition, but only Pavla Kinclová managed to advance to the all-around finals in comparison to three finalists in 1988, where Czechoslovakia entered whole women's team. Daniela Bártová later switched to athletics and participated in the 2000 Olympics in pole vault. Lenka Oulehlová recorded second of her three Olympic participations with her (and Czechoslovakia's all-time rhythmic gymnastics) best Olympics result - 8th place.

=== Artistic Gymnastics ===
Men

- Martin modlitba – qualification all-around: 112.625 points (62nd place)
- Arnold Bugár – qualification all-around: 111.200 points (77th place)

Women

- Pavla Kinclová – final all-around: 38.899 points (24th place)
- Iveta Poloková – qualification all-around: 76.773 points (58th place)
- Daniela Bártová – qualification all-around: 76.535 points (64th place)

=== Rhythmic Gymnastics ===
Individual

- Lenka Oulehlová – final: 56.137 points (8th place)
- Jana Šrámková – qualification: 27.650 points (16th place)

== Handball ==
=== Men's team competition ===
- Preliminary round (group A)
  - Czechoslovakia – Sweden 14–20
  - Czechoslovakia – Iceland 16–16
  - Czechoslovakia – South Korea 19–20
  - Czechoslovakia – Brazil 27–16
  - Czechoslovakia – Hungary 18–20
- Classification Match
  - 9th/10th place: Czechoslovakia – Germany 20-19 (→ Ninth place)
- Team Roster
  - Petr Baumruk
  - Roman Bečvář
  - Zoltán Bergendi
  - Milan Folta
  - Petr Házl
  - Ľuboš Hudák
  - Peter Kakaščík
  - Peter Kalafut
  - Václav Lanča
  - Peter Mesiarik
  - Bohumír Prokop
  - Ján Sedláček
  - Martin Šetlík
  - Ľubomír Švajlen
  - Michal Tonar
  - Zdeněk Vaněk
- Head coach: František Šulc

== Judo ==
60 kg men

- Petr Šedivák – 1st round (lost to Junior BRA)

65 kg men

- Pavel Petřikov – 3rd round (lost to Csak HUN), repechage 1st round (lost to Laats BEL)

71 kg men

- Josef Věnsek – 3rd round (lost to Korhoren FIN)

95 kg men

- Jiří Sosna – 2nd round (lost to Aurelio BRA)

61 kg women

- Miroslava Jánošíková – 3rd round (lost to Arad ISR), repechage 1st round (lost to Martin ESP)

== Modern pentathlon ==
Three male pentathletes represented Czechoslovakia in 1992.

Men

- Petr Blažek – 5.239 points (14th place)
- Tomáš Fleissner – 5.128 points (29th place)
- Jiří Prokopius – 4.635 points (57th place)

Men – teams

- Czechoslovakia – 15.002 points (9th place)
  - Petr Blažek
  - Tomáš Fleissner
  - Jiří Prokopius

== Rowing ==
Single sculls men

- Václav Chalupa – final: 6:52.93 Silver

Coxed pairs men

- Czechoslovakia – withdrew
  - Michal Dalecký, Dušan Macháček, cox Oldřich Hejdušek

Coxed fours men

- Czechoslovakia – 10th place
  - Petr Batěk, Martin Parkán, Martin Tomaštík, Ivo Žerava, cox Martin Svoboda

Eights men

- Czechoslovakia – 12th place
  - Radek Zavadil, Pavel Sokol, Petr Blecha, Jan Beneš, Pavel Menšík, Ondřej Holeček, Jiří Šefčík, Dušan Businský, cox Jiří Pták

Paired fours women

- Czechoslovakia – final: 6:35,99 (6th place)
  - Irena Soukupová, Michaela Burešová-Loukotová, (Note: also competed, as Michaela Loukotová, at the 1988 Summer Olympics) Hana Kafková, Lubica Novotníková

Eights women

- Czechoslovakia – 8th place
  - Hana Žáková, Hana Dariusová, Renata Beránková, Martina Šefčíková, Sabina Telenská, Radka Zavadilová, Michaela Vávrová, Eliška Jandová, (cox) Lenka Kováčová

== Sailing ==
Men's Sailboard (Lechner A-390)

- Patrik Hrdina
  - Final Ranking — 239.0 points (→ 25th place)

Women's 470 Class

- Renata Srbová and Radmila Dobnerová
  - Final Ranking — 112 points (→ 16th place)

== Shooting ==
Air rifle men

- Petr Kůrka – 588 points (13th place)
- Dalimil nejezchleba – 586 points (21st place)

Free pistol men

- Stanislav jirkal – 553 points (17th place)

Air pistol men

- Stanislav jirkal – 580 points (10th place)

Rapid fire pistol men

- Jindřich Skupa – 584 points (13th place)

Rifle prone men

- Milan Bakeš – 591 points (31st place)
- Miroslav Varga – 591 points (31st place)

Rifle 3x40 men

- Petr Kůrka – 1162 points (11th place)
- Milan Bakeš – 1155 points (21st place)

Skeet men

- Luboš Adamec – 197 points (11th place)
- Leoš Hlaváček – 196 points (16th place)
- David valter – 195 points (21st place)

Trap men

- Petr Hrdlička – 219 points (gold medal)
- Pavel kubec – 218 points (5th place)

Running target

- Luboš Račanský – 670 points (bronze medal)
- Miroslav Januš – 572 points (9th place)

Air rifle women

- Dagmar Bílková – 494.9 points (4th place)
- Lenka Koloušková – 586 points (17th place)

Standard rifle 3x20 women

- Lenka Koloušková – 579 points (9th place)
- Dagmar Bílková – 571 points (24th place)

Sport pistol women

- Jindřiška Šimková – 575 points (14th place)
- Regina Kodýmová – 573 points (21st place)

== Swimming ==
Men's 100m Backstroke

- Rastislav Bizub – heat: 57.57 s (did not advance, 24th place)
- Marcel Blažo – heat: 57.61 s (did not advance, 26th place)

Men's 200m Backstroke

- Marcel Blažo – heat: 2:02.81 (did not advance, 19th place)
- Rastislav bizub – heat: 2:03.30 (did not advance, 23rd place)

Men's 100m Breaststroke

- Radek beinhauer – heat: 1:04.88 (did not advance, 32nd place)

Men's 200m Breaststroke

- Radek beinhauer – B-final: 2:16.07 (13th place)

Women's 50m Freestyle

- Martina Moravcová – heat: 26.92 s (did not advance, 29th place)

Women's 100m Freestyle

- Martina Moravcová – heat: 57.19 s (did not advance, 18th place)

Women's 400m Freestyle

- Olga Šplíchalová – heat: 4:15.43, B-final: 4:16.41 (14th place)
- Hana Černá – heat: 4:19.87, B-final, B-final: 4:21.50 (16th place)

Women's 800m Freestyle

- Olga Šplíchalová – final: 8:37.66 (6th place)

Women's 100m Backstroke

- Helena Straková – heat: 1:05.38 (did not advance, 30th place)
- Martina Moravcová – heat: 1:05.73 (did not advance, 31st place)

Women's 200m Backstroke

- Helena Straková – heat: 2:18.44 (did not advance, 30th place)

Women's 100m Breaststroke

- Lenka Maňhalová – heat: 1:13.96 (did not advance, 29th place)

Women's 100m Butterfly

- Martina Moravcová – heat: 1:02.11 (did not advance, 19th place)

Women's 200m Individual Medley

- Hana Černá – heat: 2:19.93 (did not advance, 22nd place)
- Lenka Manhalová – heat: 2:20.52 (did not advance, 24th place)

Women's 400m Individual Medley

- Hana Černá – B-final: 4:50.30 (14th place)

== Synchronized swimming ==
One synchronized swimmer represented Czechoslovakia in 1992.

Women's solo

- Lucie Svrčinová

== Table tennis ==
Men's singles

- Petr Korbel – preliminary group: 2 wins, 1 loss (did not advance)
- Roland Vími – preliminary group: 1 win, 2 losses (did not advance)
- Tomáš Jančí – preliminary group: 3 losses (did not advance)

Women's singles

- Marie Hrachová – 4th place
  - preliminary group: 3 wins
  - round of 16: lost to Chai Po Wa HKG 0–3

Women's doubles

- Marie Hrachová, Jaroslava Mihočková – preliminary group: 2 wins, 1 loss (did not advance)

== Tennis ==
Men

Athlete	Event	Round of 64	Round of 32	Round of 16	Quarterfinals	Semifinals	Medal Match	
Athlete	Event	Opposition Score	Opposition Score	Opposition Score	Opposition Score	Opposition Score	Opposition Score	Rank
Marián Vajda	Singles	G Bloom (ISR); L 6–7(7), 1–6, 0–6	Did not advance					

Women

Athlete	Event	Round of 64	Round of 32	Round of 16	Quarterfinals	Semifinals	Medal Match	
Athlete	Event	Opposition Score	Opposition Score	Opposition Score	Opposition Score	Opposition Score	Opposition Score	Rank
Jana Novotná	Singles	N Zvereva (EUN); L 1–6, 0–6	Did not advance					
Helena Suková	Singles	N Randriantefy (MAD); W 6–0, 6–1	Angélica Gavaldón (MEX); L 6–4, 4–6, 3–5 r.	Did not advance				
Jana Novotná; Andrea Strnadová	Doubles		Ruxandra Dragomir (ROM); Irina Spîrlea (ROM); W 6–1, 6–4	Kimiko Date (JPN); Maya Kidowaki (JPN); W 6–3, 7–6(4)	Rachel McQuillan (AUS); Nicole Provis (AUS); L 3–6, 3–6	Did not advance		

== Water polo ==
=== Men's team competition ===
- Preliminary round (group A)
  - Lost to Unified Team (6–10)
  - Lost to United States (3–9)
  - Lost to Germany (9–15)
  - Lost to France (6–14)
  - Lost to Australia (9–15)
- Classification Matches
  - Lost to the Netherlands (8–9)
  - Lost to Greece (8–10) → 12th place
- Team Roster
  - Roman Bacik
  - Eduard Baluch
  - Vidor Borsig
  - Tomas Bundschuh
  - Pavol Dinzik
  - Peter Hornak
  - Julius Izdinsky
  - Miroslav Janich
  - Stefan Kmeto
  - Roman Polacik
  - Ladislav Vidumansky
  - Petr Veszelits

== Weightlifting ==
Athlete	Event	Snatch		Clean & Jerk		Total	Rank
Athlete	Event	Result	Rank	Result	Rank	Total	Rank
René Durbák	Men's 82.5 kg	147.5	20	182.5	19	330.0	19
Petr Krol	Men's 100 kg	162.5	14	200.0	13	362.5	12
Jaroslav Jokeľ	Men's 100 kg	162.5	13	192.5	15	355.0	14
Miloš Čiernik	Men's 110 kg	160.0	17	192.5	16	352.5	16
Jiří Zubrický	Men's +110 kg	170.0	11	222.5	5	392.5	6

== Wrestling ==
=== Greco-Roman ===
62 kg

- Jindřich Vavrla – eliminated in 2nd round

74 kg

- Jaroslav zeman – 7th place

82 kg

- Pavel frinta – 8th place

=== Freestyle ===
74 kg

- Milan Revický – eliminated in 3rd round

82 kg

- Jozef Lohyňa – 5th place

90 kg

- Josef palatinus – eliminated in 3rd round

82 kg

- Juraj Štech – eliminated in 2nd round
