= Water polo at the 1992 Summer Olympics – Men's team squads =

These are the rosters of all participating teams at the men's water polo tournament at the 1992 Summer Olympics in Barcelona.

== Rosters ==
=== Australia ===
The following players represented Australia:

- Simon Asher
- Geoffrey Clark
- John Fox
- Daniel Marsden
- Raymond Mayers
- Greg McFadden
- Guy Newman
- Mark Oberman
- Paul Oberman
- Troy Stockwell
- Glenn Townsend
- Andrew Wightman
- Chris Wybrow

=== Cuba ===
The following players represented Cuba:

- Juan Carlos Barreras
- Norge Blay
- Pablo Cuesta
- Marcelo Derouville
- Bárbaro Díaz
- Lazaro Fernández
- Ernesto García Pinheiro
- Juan Hernández Olivera
- Juan Hernández Silveira
- Guillermo Martínez Luis
- Iván Pérez
- José Ángel Ramos
- Jorge del Valle

=== Czechoslovakia ===
The following players represented Czechoslovakia:

- Štefan Kmeťo
- Ladislav Vidumanský
- Tomáš Bundschuh
- Roman Polačik
- Vidor Borsig
- Peter Horňák
- Eduard Balúch
- Pavol Dindžík
- Roman Bačík
- Peter Veszelits
- Miroslav Jančich
- Július Iždinský

=== France ===
The following players represented France:

- Thierry Alimondo
- François Besson
- Émmanuel Charlot
- Émmanuel Ducher
- Pierre Garsau
- Christophe Gautier
- Christian Grimaldi
- Nicolas Jeleff
- Pascal Loustenau
- Gilles Madelenat
- Vincent de Nardi
- Jean-Marie Olivon
- Patrice Tillie

=== Germany ===
The following players represented Germany:

- Ingo Borgmann
- Piotr Bukowski
- Jörg Dresel
- Torsten Dresel
- Carsten Kusch
- Frank Otto
- Raúl de la Peña
- Reibel Guido
- René Reimann
- Peter Röhle
- Hagen Stamm
- Uwe Sterzik
- Dirk Theismann

=== Greece ===
The following players represented Greece:

- Dimitrios Bitsakos
- Kyriakos Giannopoulos
- Filippos Kaiafas
- Theodoros Lorantos
- Konstantinos Loudis
- Georgios Mavrotas
- Tasos Papanastasiou
- Evangelos Pateros
- Vangelis Patras
- Epaminondas Samartzidis
- Dimitrios Seletopoulos
- Nikolaos Venetopoulos
- Gerasimos Voltyrakis

=== Hungary ===
The following players represented Hungary:

- Tibor Benedek
- István Dóczi
- András Gyöngyösi
- Péter Kuna
- Gábor Nemes
- Imre Péter
- Zsolt Petőváry
- Gábor Schmiedt
- Frank Tóth
- Imre Tóth
- László Tóth
- Zsolt Varga
- Balázs Vincze

=== Italy ===
The following players represented Italy:

- Francesco Attolico
- Gianni Averaimo
- Alessandro Bovo
- Alessandro Campagna
- Paolo Caldarella
- Marco D'Altrui
- Massimiliano Ferretti
- Mario Fiorillo
- Ferdinando Gandolfi
- Amedeo Pomilio
- Francesco Porzio
- Giuseppe Porzio
- Carlo Silipo

=== Netherlands ===
The following players represented the Netherlands:

- Marc van Belkum
- Bert Brinkman
- Arie van de Bunt
- Robert Havekotte
- Koos Issard
- John Jansen
- Gijsbert van der Leden
- Harry van der Meer
- Hans Nieuwenburg
- Remco Pielstroom
- John Scherrenburg
- Jalo de Vries
- Jan Wagenaar

=== Spain ===
The following players represented Spain:

- Daniel Ballart
- Manuel Estiarte
- Pedro Francisco García
- Salvador Gómez
- Marco Antonio González
- Rubén Michavila
- Miguel Ángel Oca
- Sergi Pedrerol
- Josep Picó
- Jesús Rollán
- Ricardo Sánchez
- Jordi Sans
- Manuel Silvestre

=== Unified Team ===
The following players represented the Unified Team:

- Dmitri Apanassenko
- Andrei Belofastov
- Evgueni Charonov
- Dmitry Gorshkov
- Vladimir Karaboutov
- Aleksandr Kolotov
- Alexandre Kovalenko
- Nikolay Kozlov
- Serguei Markotch
- Sergey Naumov
- Alexandre Ogorodnikov
- Alexandre Tchuguir
- Alexei Vdovine

=== United States ===
The following players represented the United States:

- Jeff Campbell
- Christopher Duplanty
- Mike Evans
- Kirk Everist
- Erich Fischer
- Charles Harris
- Chris Humbert
- Douglas Kimbell
- Craig Klass
- Alex Rousseau
- Terry Schroeder
- John Vargas
- Craig Wilson
