= 1996 European Men's Handball Championship =

1996 edition of the European Men's Handball Championship

Tournament details
- Host country: Spain
- Venues: 2 (in 2 host cities)
- Dates: 24 May – 1 June
- Teams: 12 (from 1 confederation)

Final positions
- Champions: Russia (1st title)
- Runners-up: Spain
- Third place: FR Yugoslavia
- Fourth place: Sweden

Tournament statistics
- Matches played: 38
- Goals scored: 1,815 (47.76 per match)
- Top scorers: (Germany) Thomas Knorr (41 goals)

Awards
- Best player: (Spain) Talant Dujshebaev

The 1996 European Men's Handball Championship was the second edition of the tournament and held in Spain from 24 May to 1 June 1996, in the cities of Ciudad Real and Seville. Russia won the tournament after defeating Spain in the final, while Yugoslavia finished third.

== Teams ==
Group A	Group B
Croatia	Czech Republic
Hungary	Sweden
Slovenia	France
Germany	Romania
FR Yugoslavia	Spain
Russia	Denmark

== Venues ==
City	Stadium	Capacity
Ciudad Real	Pabellón Santa María	2.000
Seville	Palacio de Deportes San Pablo	7.000

== Preliminary round ==
All times are local (UTC+2).

=== Group A ===
Pos	Team	Pld	W	D	L	GF	GA	GD	Pts	Qualification
1	Russia	5	4	1	0	125	98	+27	9	Semifinals
2	FR Yugoslavia	5	4	1	0	117	110	+7	9	Semifinals
3	Croatia	5	3	0	2	127	125	+2	6	Fifth place game
4	Germany	5	1	1	3	110	111	−1	3	Seventh place game
5	Hungary	5	1	1	3	117	130	−13	3	Ninth place game
6	Slovenia	5	0	0	5	93	115	−22	0	Eleventh place game

Source: EHF

24 May 1996; 17:00	Croatia	30–27	Hungary	Pabellón Santa María, Ciudad Real; Attendance: 200; Referees: Gallego, Lamas (ESP)
24 May 1996; 17:00	Ćavar, Puc 6	(17–13)	Pásztor 6	Pabellón Santa María, Ciudad Real; Attendance: 200; Referees: Gallego, Lamas (ESP)
24 May 1996; 17:00		Report		Pabellón Santa María, Ciudad Real; Attendance: 200; Referees: Gallego, Lamas (ESP)

24 May 1996; 19:00	FR Yugoslavia	23–22	Germany	Pabellón Santa María, Ciudad Real; Attendance: 400; Referees: Øie, Høgsnes (NOR)
24 May 1996; 19:00	Škrbić 8	(10–9)	Knorr 5	Pabellón Santa María, Ciudad Real; Attendance: 400; Referees: Øie, Høgsnes (NOR)
24 May 1996; 19:00		Report		Pabellón Santa María, Ciudad Real; Attendance: 400; Referees: Øie, Høgsnes (NOR)

24 May 1996; 21:00	Russia	22–18	Slovenia	Pabellón Santa María, Ciudad Real; Attendance: 500; Referees: Dancescu, Mateescu (ROU)
24 May 1996; 21:00	Gopin, Voronin 5	(10–7)	Pungartnik 5	Pabellón Santa María, Ciudad Real; Attendance: 500; Referees: Dancescu, Mateescu (ROU)
24 May 1996; 21:00	3× (yellow card) 3× (suspension)	Report	2× (yellow card) 5× (suspension)	Pabellón Santa María, Ciudad Real; Attendance: 500; Referees: Dancescu, Mateescu (ROU)

25 May 1996; 15:00	Germany	21–26	Croatia	Pabellón Santa María, Ciudad Real; Attendance: 500; Referees: Elbrønd, Løvqvist (DEN)
25 May 1996; 15:00	Kretzschmar 6	(10–11)	Ćavar 8	Pabellón Santa María, Ciudad Real; Attendance: 500; Referees: Elbrønd, Løvqvist (DEN)
25 May 1996; 15:00	1× (yellow card) 1× (suspension)	Report		Pabellón Santa María, Ciudad Real; Attendance: 500; Referees: Elbrønd, Løvqvist (DEN)

25 May 1996; 17:00	Slovenia	20–21	FR Yugoslavia	Pabellón Santa María, Ciudad Real; Attendance: 400; Referees: Wille, Vorderleitner (AUT)
25 May 1996; 17:00	Pungartnik 6	(10–10)	Stefanovič 7	Pabellón Santa María, Ciudad Real; Attendance: 400; Referees: Wille, Vorderleitner (AUT)
25 May 1996; 17:00	2× (yellow card) 3× (suspension)	Report	2× (yellow card) 4× (suspension)	Pabellón Santa María, Ciudad Real; Attendance: 400; Referees: Wille, Vorderleitner (AUT)

25 May 1996; 19:00	Hungary	21–33	Russia	Pabellón Santa María, Ciudad Real; Attendance: 350; Referees: Brussel, van Dongen (NED)
25 May 1996; 19:00	Kis 6	(10–16)	Kuleshov 8	Pabellón Santa María, Ciudad Real; Attendance: 350; Referees: Brussel, van Dongen (NED)
25 May 1996; 19:00		Report		Pabellón Santa María, Ciudad Real; Attendance: 350; Referees: Brussel, van Dongen (NED)

26 May 1996; 17:00	Hungary	24–24	Germany	Pabellón Santa María, Ciudad Real; Attendance: 600; Referees: Dancescu, Mateescu (ROU)
26 May 1996; 17:00	Bendó 7	(11–12)	Schwalb 8	Pabellón Santa María, Ciudad Real; Attendance: 600; Referees: Dancescu, Mateescu (ROU)
26 May 1996; 17:00	1× (yellow card) 3× (suspension)	Report	3× (yellow card) 2× (suspension)	Pabellón Santa María, Ciudad Real; Attendance: 600; Referees: Dancescu, Mateescu (ROU)

26 May 1996; 19:00	Croatia	26–22	Slovenia	Pabellón Santa María, Ciudad Real; Attendance: 800; Referees: Gallego, Lamas (ESP)
26 May 1996; 19:00	Ćavar 8	(13–9)	Tomšič 5	Pabellón Santa María, Ciudad Real; Attendance: 800; Referees: Gallego, Lamas (ESP)
26 May 1996; 19:00		Report		Pabellón Santa María, Ciudad Real; Attendance: 800; Referees: Gallego, Lamas (ESP)

26 May 1996; 21:00	Russia	20–20	FR Yugoslavia	Pabellón Santa María, Ciudad Real; Referees: Elbrønd, Løvqvist (DEN)
26 May 1996; 21:00	Torgovanov 4	(11–8)	three players 4	Pabellón Santa María, Ciudad Real; Referees: Elbrønd, Løvqvist (DEN)
26 May 1996; 21:00	2× (yellow card) 4× (suspension)	Report	2× (yellow card) 6× (suspension)	Pabellón Santa María, Ciudad Real; Referees: Elbrønd, Løvqvist (DEN)

28 May 1996; 17:00	FR Yugoslavia	27–24	Croatia	Palacio Municipal de Deportes San Pablo, Seville; Attendance: 1,500; Referees: Øie, Høgsnes (NOR)
28 May 1996; 17:00	Knežević 7	(14–11)	Ćavar 9	Palacio Municipal de Deportes San Pablo, Seville; Attendance: 1,500; Referees: Øie, Høgsnes (NOR)
28 May 1996; 17:00	2× (yellow card) 5× (suspension)	Report	3× (yellow card) 3× (suspension)	Palacio Municipal de Deportes San Pablo, Seville; Attendance: 1,500; Referees: Øie, Høgsnes (NOR)

28 May 1996; 19:00	Russia	22–18	Germany	Palacio Municipal de Deportes San Pablo, Seville; Attendance: 350; Referees: Gallego, Lamas (ESP)
28 May 1996; 19:00	Atavin, Torgovanov 5	(11–9)	Knorr 7	Palacio Municipal de Deportes San Pablo, Seville; Attendance: 350; Referees: Gallego, Lamas (ESP)
28 May 1996; 19:00		Report		Palacio Municipal de Deportes San Pablo, Seville; Attendance: 350; Referees: Gallego, Lamas (ESP)

28 May 1996; 21:00	Slovenia	17–21	Hungary	Palacio Municipal de Deportes San Pablo, Seville; Attendance: 300; Referees: Brussel, van Dongen (NED)
28 May 1996; 21:00	Kastelic, Vugrinec 3	(7–10)	Pásztor 7	Palacio Municipal de Deportes San Pablo, Seville; Attendance: 300; Referees: Brussel, van Dongen (NED)
28 May 1996; 21:00		Report	2× (yellow card) 3× (suspension) 1× (red card)	Palacio Municipal de Deportes San Pablo, Seville; Attendance: 300; Referees: Brussel, van Dongen (NED)

29 May 1996; 17:00	FR Yugoslavia	26–24	Hungary	Palacio Municipal de Deportes San Pablo, Seville; Attendance: 350; Referees: Elbrønd, Løvqvist (DEN)
29 May 1996; 17:00	Škrbić 8	(12–14)	Zsigmond 9	Palacio Municipal de Deportes San Pablo, Seville; Attendance: 350; Referees: Elbrønd, Løvqvist (DEN)
29 May 1996; 17:00	2× (yellow card) 1× (suspension)	Report	2× (yellow card) 5× (suspension)	Palacio Municipal de Deportes San Pablo, Seville; Attendance: 350; Referees: Elbrønd, Løvqvist (DEN)

29 May 1996; 19:00	Germany	25–16	Slovenia	Palacio Municipal de Deportes San Pablo, Seville; Referees: Dancescu, Mateescu (ROU)
29 May 1996; 19:00	Knorr 8	(10–5)	three players 3	Palacio Municipal de Deportes San Pablo, Seville; Referees: Dancescu, Mateescu (ROU)
29 May 1996; 19:00		Report		Palacio Municipal de Deportes San Pablo, Seville; Referees: Dancescu, Mateescu (ROU)

29 May 1996; 21:00	Croatia	21–28	Russia	Palacio Municipal de Deportes San Pablo, Seville; Attendance: 350; Referees: Bülow, Lübker (GER)
29 May 1996; 21:00	Saračević 11	(11–13)	Gopin 10	Palacio Municipal de Deportes San Pablo, Seville; Attendance: 350; Referees: Bülow, Lübker (GER)
29 May 1996; 21:00		Report		Palacio Municipal de Deportes San Pablo, Seville; Attendance: 350; Referees: Bülow, Lübker (GER)

=== Group B ===
Pos	Team	Pld	W	D	L	GF	GA	GD	Pts	Qualification
1	Spain (H)	5	4	0	1	124	116	+8	8	Semifinals
2	Sweden	5	4	0	1	124	106	+18	8	Semifinals
3	Czech Republic	5	3	0	2	129	125	+4	6	Fifth place game
4	France	5	3	0	2	130	120	+10	6	Seventh place game
5	Romania	5	1	0	4	117	134	−17	2	Ninth place game
6	Denmark	5	0	0	5	108	131	−23	0	Eleventh place game

Source: EHF
(H) Hosts

24 May 1996; 17:00	Czech Republic	32–25	Romania	Palacio Municipal de Deportes San Pablo, Seville; Attendance: 600; Referees: Wille, Vorderleitner (AUT)
24 May 1996; 17:00	Tonar 13	(17–13)	Beșta 6	Palacio Municipal de Deportes San Pablo, Seville; Attendance: 600; Referees: Wille, Vorderleitner (AUT)
24 May 1996; 17:00		Report		Palacio Municipal de Deportes San Pablo, Seville; Attendance: 600; Referees: Wille, Vorderleitner (AUT)

24 May 1996; 19:00	Sweden	23–24	Spain	Palacio Municipal de Deportes San Pablo, Seville; Attendance: 3,000; Referees: Vujnović, Mladinić (CRO)
24 May 1996; 19:00	Thorsson 5	(11–14)	Dujshebaev 6	Palacio Municipal de Deportes San Pablo, Seville; Attendance: 3,000; Referees: Vujnović, Mladinić (CRO)
24 May 1996; 19:00		Report		Palacio Municipal de Deportes San Pablo, Seville; Attendance: 3,000; Referees: Vujnović, Mladinić (CRO)

24 May 1996; 21:00	Denmark	22–25	France	Palacio Municipal de Deportes San Pablo, Seville; Attendance: 1,500; Referees: Brussel, van Dongen (NED)
24 May 1996; 21:00	Jacobsen 5	(11–12)	Prandi, Stoecklin 7	Palacio Municipal de Deportes San Pablo, Seville; Attendance: 1,500; Referees: Brussel, van Dongen (NED)
24 May 1996; 21:00	2× (yellow card) 4× (suspension)	Report		Palacio Municipal de Deportes San Pablo, Seville; Attendance: 1,500; Referees: Brussel, van Dongen (NED)

25 May 1996; 17:00	Spain	28–22	Denmark	Palacio Municipal de Deportes San Pablo, Seville; Attendance: 3,200; Referees: Bülow, Lübker (GER)
25 May 1996; 17:00	Dujshebaev 6	(12–8)	three players 4	Palacio Municipal de Deportes San Pablo, Seville; Attendance: 3,200; Referees: Bülow, Lübker (GER)
25 May 1996; 17:00	2× (yellow card) 4× (suspension)	Report	2× (yellow card) 4× (suspension)	Palacio Municipal de Deportes San Pablo, Seville; Attendance: 3,200; Referees: Bülow, Lübker (GER)

25 May 1996; 19:00	France	29–31	Czech Republic	Palacio Municipal de Deportes San Pablo, Seville; Attendance: 1,500; Referees: Vujnović, Mladinić (CRO)
25 May 1996; 19:00	Stoecklin 8	(11–16)	Tonar 12	Palacio Municipal de Deportes San Pablo, Seville; Attendance: 1,500; Referees: Vujnović, Mladinić (CRO)
25 May 1996; 19:00		Report		Palacio Municipal de Deportes San Pablo, Seville; Attendance: 1,500; Referees: Vujnović, Mladinić (CRO)

25 May 1996; 21:00	Romania	24–28	Sweden	Palacio Municipal de Deportes San Pablo, Seville; Attendance: 850; Referees: Makarov, Danelia (RUS)
25 May 1996; 21:00	Beșta 6	(14–14)	Lövgren 8	Palacio Municipal de Deportes San Pablo, Seville; Attendance: 850; Referees: Makarov, Danelia (RUS)
25 May 1996; 21:00		Report		Palacio Municipal de Deportes San Pablo, Seville; Attendance: 850; Referees: Makarov, Danelia (RUS)

26 May 1996; 17:00	Czech Republic	21–25	Spain	Palacio Municipal de Deportes San Pablo, Seville; Attendance: 1,500; Referees: Makarov, Danelia (RUS)
26 May 1996; 17:00	Šetlík 6	(10–11)	Guijosa 7	Palacio Municipal de Deportes San Pablo, Seville; Attendance: 1,500; Referees: Makarov, Danelia (RUS)
26 May 1996; 17:00		Report		Palacio Municipal de Deportes San Pablo, Seville; Attendance: 1,500; Referees: Makarov, Danelia (RUS)

26 May 1996; 19:00	Sweden	23–21	Denmark	Palacio Municipal de Deportes San Pablo, Seville; Attendance: 1,250; Referees: Øie, Høgsnes (NOR)
26 May 1996; 19:00	Andersson 6	(12–8)	Hjermind 5	Palacio Municipal de Deportes San Pablo, Seville; Attendance: 1,250; Referees: Øie, Høgsnes (NOR)
26 May 1996; 19:00		Report		Palacio Municipal de Deportes San Pablo, Seville; Attendance: 1,250; Referees: Øie, Høgsnes (NOR)

26 May 1996; 21:00	Romania	20–27	France	Palacio Municipal de Deportes San Pablo, Seville; Attendance: 250; Referees: Wille, Vorderleitner (AUT)
26 May 1996; 21:00	Licu 10	(11–13)	Stoecklin 8	Palacio Municipal de Deportes San Pablo, Seville; Attendance: 250; Referees: Wille, Vorderleitner (AUT)
26 May 1996; 21:00		Report		Palacio Municipal de Deportes San Pablo, Seville; Attendance: 250; Referees: Wille, Vorderleitner (AUT)

28 May 1996; 16:30	Denmark	22–28	Czech Republic	Pabellón Santa María, Ciudad Real; Attendance: 150; Referees: Wille, Vorderleitner (AUT)
28 May 1996; 16:30	Jacobsen 7	(9–12)	Blecha, Šetlík 5	Pabellón Santa María, Ciudad Real; Attendance: 150; Referees: Wille, Vorderleitner (AUT)
28 May 1996; 16:30		Report		Pabellón Santa María, Ciudad Real; Attendance: 150; Referees: Wille, Vorderleitner (AUT)

28 May 1996; 19:00	Spain	26–21	Romania	Pabellón Santa María, Ciudad Real; Attendance: 1,800; Referees: Vujnović, Mladinić (CRO)
28 May 1996; 19:00	Guijosa 12	(15–10)	Beșta, Licu 5	Pabellón Santa María, Ciudad Real; Attendance: 1,800; Referees: Vujnović, Mladinić (CRO)
28 May 1996; 19:00		Report		Pabellón Santa María, Ciudad Real; Attendance: 1,800; Referees: Vujnović, Mladinić (CRO)

28 May 1996; 21:00	Sweden	26–20	France	Pabellón Santa María, Ciudad Real; Attendance: 750; Referees: Bülow, Lübker (GER)
28 May 1996; 21:00	three players 5	(13–12)	Stoecklin 7	Pabellón Santa María, Ciudad Real; Attendance: 750; Referees: Bülow, Lübker (GER)
28 May 1996; 21:00		Report		Pabellón Santa María, Ciudad Real; Attendance: 750; Referees: Bülow, Lübker (GER)

29 May 1996; 17:00	Denmark	21–27	Romania	Pabellón Santa María, Ciudad Real; Attendance: 1,000; Referees: Makarov, Danelia (RUS)
29 May 1996; 17:00	Hamann-Boeriths 5	(10–15)	Dedu 6	Pabellón Santa María, Ciudad Real; Attendance: 1,000; Referees: Makarov, Danelia (RUS)
29 May 1996; 17:00	2× (yellow card) 4× (suspension)	Report	2× (yellow card) 4× (suspension)	Pabellón Santa María, Ciudad Real; Attendance: 1,000; Referees: Makarov, Danelia (RUS)

29 May 1996; 19:00	France	29–21	Spain	Pabellón Santa María, Ciudad Real; Attendance: 2,000; Referees: Øie, Høgsnes (NOR)
29 May 1996; 19:00	Prandi 8	(16–13)	Guijosa 6	Pabellón Santa María, Ciudad Real; Attendance: 2,000; Referees: Øie, Høgsnes (NOR)
29 May 1996; 19:00		Report		Pabellón Santa María, Ciudad Real; Attendance: 2,000; Referees: Øie, Høgsnes (NOR)

29 May 1996; 21:00	Czech Republic	17–24	Sweden	Pabellón Santa María, Ciudad Real; Attendance: 400; Referees: Brussel, van Dongen (NED)
29 May 1996; 21:00	Šetlík 5	(7–13)	Lövgren 5	Pabellón Santa María, Ciudad Real; Attendance: 400; Referees: Brussel, van Dongen (NED)
29 May 1996; 21:00		Report		Pabellón Santa María, Ciudad Real; Attendance: 400; Referees: Brussel, van Dongen (NED)

== Placement games ==
=== Eleventh place game ===
31 May 1996; 17:00	Slovenia	27–24	Denmark	Palacio Municipal de Deportes San Pablo, Seville; Attendance: 350; Referees: Dancescu, Mateescu (ROU)
31 May 1996; 17:00	Begovič 8	(12–11)		Palacio Municipal de Deportes San Pablo, Seville; Attendance: 350; Referees: Dancescu, Mateescu (ROU)
31 May 1996; 17:00		Report		Palacio Municipal de Deportes San Pablo, Seville; Attendance: 350; Referees: Dancescu, Mateescu (ROU)

=== Ninth place game ===
31 May 1996; 19:00	Hungary	27–28	Romania	Palacio Municipal de Deportes San Pablo, Seville; Attendance: 350; Referees: Wille, Vorderleitner (AUT)
31 May 1996; 19:00	Bendó 6	(13–12)	Licu 7	Palacio Municipal de Deportes San Pablo, Seville; Attendance: 350; Referees: Wille, Vorderleitner (AUT)
31 May 1996; 19:00		Report	2× (yellow card) 3× (suspension)	Palacio Municipal de Deportes San Pablo, Seville; Attendance: 350; Referees: Wille, Vorderleitner (AUT)

=== Seventh place game ===
31 May 1996; 17:00	Germany	21–24	France	Pabellón Santa María, Ciudad Real; Attendance: 1,000; Referees: Makarov, Danelia (RUS)
31 May 1996; 17:00	Knorr 12	(9–13)	Richardson, Stoecklin 6	Pabellón Santa María, Ciudad Real; Attendance: 1,000; Referees: Makarov, Danelia (RUS)
31 May 1996; 17:00		Report	1× (suspension)	Pabellón Santa María, Ciudad Real; Attendance: 1,000; Referees: Makarov, Danelia (RUS)

=== Fifth place game ===
31 May 1996; 21:00	Croatia	27–25	Czech Republic	Pabellón Santa María, Ciudad Real; Attendance: 300; Referees: Gallego, Lamas (ESP)
31 May 1996; 21:00	Smajlagić 9	(14–7)	Tonar 9	Pabellón Santa María, Ciudad Real; Attendance: 300; Referees: Gallego, Lamas (ESP)
31 May 1996; 21:00		Report		Pabellón Santa María, Ciudad Real; Attendance: 300; Referees: Gallego, Lamas (ESP)

== Knockout stage ==
=== Bracket ===
Semi-finals
Russia	24
Sweden	21
Spain	27
FR Yugoslavia	23

Final
Russia	23
Spain	22
Bronze-final
Sweden	25
FR Yugoslavia	26

=== Semifinals ===
31 May 1996; 19:00	Spain	27–23	FR Yugoslavia	Pabellón Santa María, Ciudad Real; Referees: Øie, Høgsnes (NOR)
31 May 1996; 19:00	Dujshebaev 7	(12–7)	Stefanovič 5	Pabellón Santa María, Ciudad Real; Referees: Øie, Høgsnes (NOR)
31 May 1996; 19:00		Report		Pabellón Santa María, Ciudad Real; Referees: Øie, Høgsnes (NOR)

31 May 1996; 21:00	Russia	24–21	Sweden	Pabellón Santa María, Ciudad Real; Attendance: 650; Referees: Vujnović, Mladinić (CRO)
31 May 1996; 21:00	Kudinov 7	(11–8)	Andersson, Thorsson 6	Pabellón Santa María, Ciudad Real; Attendance: 650; Referees: Vujnović, Mladinić (CRO)
31 May 1996; 21:00		Report		Pabellón Santa María, Ciudad Real; Attendance: 650; Referees: Vujnović, Mladinić (CRO)

=== Third place game ===
1 June 1996; 11:30	FR Yugoslavia	26–25	Sweden	Palacio Municipal de Deportes San Pablo, Seville; Attendance: 3,500; Referees: Bülow, Lübker (GER)
1 June 1996; 11:30		(13–15)		Palacio Municipal de Deportes San Pablo, Seville; Attendance: 3,500; Referees: Bülow, Lübker (GER)
1 June 1996; 11:30		Report		Palacio Municipal de Deportes San Pablo, Seville; Attendance: 3,500; Referees: Bülow, Lübker (GER)

=== Final ===
1 June 1996; 13:30	Russia	23–22	Spain	Palacio Municipal de Deportes San Pablo, Seville; Attendance: 7,500; Referees: Elbrønd, Løvqvist (DEN)
1 June 1996; 13:30		(13–9)		Palacio Municipal de Deportes San Pablo, Seville; Attendance: 7,500; Referees: Elbrønd, Løvqvist (DEN)
1 June 1996; 13:30		Report		Palacio Municipal de Deportes San Pablo, Seville; Attendance: 7,500; Referees: Elbrønd, Løvqvist (DEN)

== Ranking and statistics ==
=== Final ranking ===
Gold medal	Russia
Silver medal	Spain
Bronze medal	FR Yugoslavia
4	Sweden
5	Croatia
6	Czech Republic
7	France
8	Germany
9	Romania
10	Hungary
11	Slovenia
12	Denmark

1996 Men's European Champions

Russia
First Title

Team roster: Andrey Lavrov, Pavel Sukosyan, Igor Lavrov, Stanislav Kulinchenko, Oleg Kuleshov, Denis Krivoshlykov, Lev Voronin, Valery Gopin, Vasily Kudinov, Dmitri Torgovanov, Vyacheslav Atavin, Oleg Grebnev, Oleg Kiselyov, Sergey Pogorelov, Dmitry Filippov.
Head coach: Vladimir Maksimov.
