= 1993–94 USL Dunkerque season =

USL Dunkerque
1993–94 season
- President: Jean Rouvroy
- Manager: Alex Dupont
- Stadium: Stade Marcel-Tribut
- Division 2: 8th
- Coupe de France: Eighth round
- Biggest defeat: Saint-Brieuc 4–0 Dunkerque

The 1993–94 season was the 85th season in the existence of USL Dunkerque and the club's 28th consecutive season in the second division of French football. In addition to the domestic league, Angers participated in this season's edition of the Coupe de France. The season covered the period from 1 July 1993 to 30 June 1994.

== Competitions ==
=== Overall record ===
Competition	First match	Last match	Starting round	Final position	Record							
Competition	First match	Last match	Starting round	Final position	Pld	W	D	L	GF	GA	GD	Win %
French Division 2	24 July 1993	25 May 1994	Matchday 1	8th	42	13	16	13	44	51	−7	30.95
Coupe de France	18 December 1993		Eighth round	Eighth round	1	0	0	1	1	4	−3	0.00
Total					43	13	16	14	45	55	−10	30.23

Source: Competitions

=== French Division 2 ===
==== League table ====
Pos	Team	Pld	W	D	L	GF	GA	GD	Pts
6	Saint-Brieuc	42	18	11	13	53	52	+1	47
7	Laval	42	16	14	12	56	47	+9	46
8	Dunkerque	42	13	16	13	44	51	−7	42
9	Charleville	42	14	14	14	41	48	−7	42
10	Alès	42	13	15	14	47	50	−3	41

Source: Ligue 2

==== Results summary ====
Overall								Home						Away					
Pld	W	D	L	GF	GA	GD	Pts	W	D	L	GF	GA	GD	W	D	L	GF	GA	GD
42	13	16	13	44	51	−7	55	9	9	3	26	17	+9	4	7	10	18	34	−16

Source: French Division 2

==== Results by round ====
Round	1	2	3	4	5	6	7	8	9	10	11	12	13	14	15	16	17	18	19	20	21	22	23	24	25	26	27	28	29	30	31	32	33	34	35	36	37	38	39	40	41	42
Ground	A	H	A	H	A	H	A	H	A	H	A	H	A	H	A	H	A	A	H	A	H	A	H	A	H	A	H	A	H	A	H	A	H	A	H	A	H	H	A	H	A	H
Result	L	D	D	D	D	D	D	W	L	W	D	L	W	L	W	W	L	L	D	D	W	D	D	L	W	W	D	D	W	L	L	W	W	L	W	L	D	W	L	D	L	D
Position																																										

Source: French Division 2
A = Away; H = Home; W = Win; D = Draw; L = Loss

==== Matches ====
24 July 1993 1	Gueugnon	1–0	Dunkerque	Gueugnon
CEST (UTC+2)

31 July 1993 2	Dunkerque	0–0	Nancy	Dunkirk
CEST (UTC+2)				Stadium: Stade Marcel-Tribut

4 August 1993 3	Bourges	1–1	Dunkerque	Bourges
CEST (UTC+2)

8 August 1993 4	Dunkerque	0–0	Istres	Dunkirk
CEST (UTC+2)				Stadium: Stade Marcel-Tribut

11 August 1993 5	Alès	1–1	Dunkerque	Alès
CEST (UTC+2)

14 August 1993 6	Dunkerque	0–0	Nice	Dunkirk
CEST (UTC+2)				Stadium: Stade Marcel-Tribut

25 August 1993 7	Red Star	3–3	Dunkerque	Saint-Ouen-sur-Seine
CEST (UTC+2)				Stadium: Stade Bauer

28 August 1993 8	Dunkerque	1–0	Rennes	Dunkirk
CEST (UTC+2)				Stadium: Stade Marcel-Tribut

1 September 1993 9	Rouen	2–0	Dunkerque	Rouen
CEST (UTC+2)

11 September 1993 10	Dunkerque	4–1	Valenciennes	Dunkirk
CEST (UTC+2)				Stadium: Stade Marcel-Tribut

18 September 1993 11	Le Mans	0–0	Dunkerque	Le Mans
CEST (UTC+2)

22 September 1993 12	Dunkerque	0–3	Niort	Dunkirk
CEST (UTC+2)				Stadium: Stade Marcel-Tribut

25 September 1993 13	Valence	0–1	Dunkerque	Valence
CEST (UTC+2)

2 October 1993 14	Dunkerque	0–2	Mulhouse	Dunkirk
CEST (UTC+2)				Stadium: Stade Marcel-Tribut

6 October 1993 15	Nîmes	0–1	Dunkerque	Nîmes
CEST (UTC+2)

16 October 1993 16	Dunkerque	1–0	Bastia	Dunkirk
CEST (UTC+2)				Stadium: Stade Marcel-Tribut

23 October 1993 17	Sedan	3–2	Dunkerque	Sedan
CEST (UTC+2)

27 October 1993 18	Saint-Brieuc	4–0	Dunkerque	Saint-Brieuc
CEST (UTC+2)

30 October 1993 19	Dunkerque	0–0	Charleville	Dunkirk
CEST (UTC+2)				Stadium: Stade Marcel-Tribut

6 November 1993 20	Beauvais	1–1	Dunkerque	Beauvais
CEST (UTC+2)

10 November 1993 21	Dunkerque	1–0	Laval	Dunkirk
CEST (UTC+2)				Stadium: Stade Marcel-Tribut

20 November 1993 22	Nancy	1–1	Dunkerque	Tomblaine
CEST (UTC+2)

27 November 1993 23	Dunkerque	1–1	Bourges	Dunkirk
CEST (UTC+2)				Stadium: Stade Marcel-Tribut

4 December 1993 24	Istres	2–0	Dunkerque	Istres
CEST (UTC+2)

11 December 1993 25	Dunkerque	4–1	Alès	Dunkirk
CEST (UTC+2)				Stadium: Stade Marcel-Tribut

15 January 1994 26	Nice	1–2	Dunkerque	Nice
CEST (UTC+2)				Stadium: Stade du Ray

29 January 1994 27	Dunkerque	1–1	Red Star	Dunkirk
CEST (UTC+2)				Stadium: Stade Marcel-Tribut

5 February 1994 28	Rennes	1–1	Dunkerque	Rennes
CEST (UTC+2)

19 February 1994 29	Dunkerque	3–1	Rouen	Dunkirk
CEST (UTC+2)				Stadium: Stade Marcel-Tribut

26 February 1994 30	Valenciennes	1–0	Dunkerque	Valenciennes
CEST (UTC+2)	Dufresne 56'

5 March 1994 31	Dunkerque	2–3	Le Mans	Dunkirk
CEST (UTC+2)				Stadium: Stade Marcel-Tribut

12 March 1994 32	Niort	0–1	Dunkerque	Niort
CEST (UTC+2)

26 March 1994 33	Dunkerque	2–1	Valence	Dunkirk
CEST (UTC+2)				Stadium: Stade Marcel-Tribut

2 April 1994 34	Mulhouse	2–1	Dunkerque	Mulhouse
CEST (UTC+2)

8 April 1994 35	Dunkerque	2–0	Nîmes	Dunkirk
CEST (UTC+2)				Stadium: Stade Marcel-Tribut

16 April 1994 36	Bastia	3–0	Dunkerque	Furiani
CEST (UTC+2)

23 April 1994 37	Dunkerque	0–0	Sedan	Dunkirk
CEST (UTC+2)				Stadium: Stade Marcel-Tribut

30 April 1994 38	Dunkerque	2–1	Saint-Brieuc	Dunkirk
CEST (UTC+2)				Stadium: Stade Marcel-Tribut

4 May 1994 39	Charleville	3–1	Dunkerque	Charleville-Mézières
CEST (UTC+2)

11 May 1994 40	Dunkerque	1–1	Beauvais	Dunkirk
CEST (UTC+2)				Stadium: Stade Marcel-Tribut

21 May 1994 41	Laval	4–1	Dunkerque	Laval
CEST (UTC+2)

25 May 1994 42	Dunkerque	1–1	Gueugnon	Dunkirk
CEST (UTC+2)	Gautier 33'		Marciniak 30'	Stadium: Stade Marcel-Tribut

=== Coupe de France ===
18 December 1993 Eighth round	Beauvais	4–2	Dunkerque	Beauvais
CEST (UTC+2)
