= Bačík =

Bačík (feminine: Bačíková) is a Czech and Slovak surname. Notable people with the surname include:

- Alžbeta Bačíková (born 1990), Slovak cyclist
- Charles Bacik (1910–1991), Czech-Irish glass manufacturer
- Ivana Bacik (born 1968), Irish politician
- Ladislav Bačík (1933–2016), Slovak swimmer
- Martin Bačík (footballer, born 1989), Czech footballer
- Martin Bačík (footballer, born 2007), Slovak footballer
- Patrik Bačík (born 1995), Slovak ice hockey player
- Roman Bačík (born 1959), Slovak water polo player
