= Vidor (disambiguation) =

Vidor may refer to:

- Vidor (surname)
- Vidor Borsig (born 1963), Slovak water polo player
- Vidor, a town and commune in Italy
- Vidor Limited, a British radio manufacturer
- Vidor, Texas, a city in the USA

== See also ==
- Widor
