= Martin Bačík =

Martin Bačík may refer to:

- Martin Bačík (footballer, born 2007), Slovak footballer
- Martin Bačík (footballer, born 1989), Czech footballer
