= Jonathan Moriamé =

French water polo player (born 1984)

Personal information
- Born: 19 June 1984 (age 42) Noisy-le-Sec, France
- Height: 203 cm (6 ft 8 in)
- Weight: 104 kg (229 lb)

Sport
- Sport: Water polo
- Club: CN Noisy

Jonathan Moriamé (born 19 June 1984) is a water polo player from France. He was part of the French team at the 2016 Summer Olympics, where the team was eliminated in the group stage.

== See also ==
- France men's Olympic water polo team records and statistics
- List of men's Olympic water polo tournament goalkeepers
