= Robert Desmettre =

French water polo player (1901–1936)

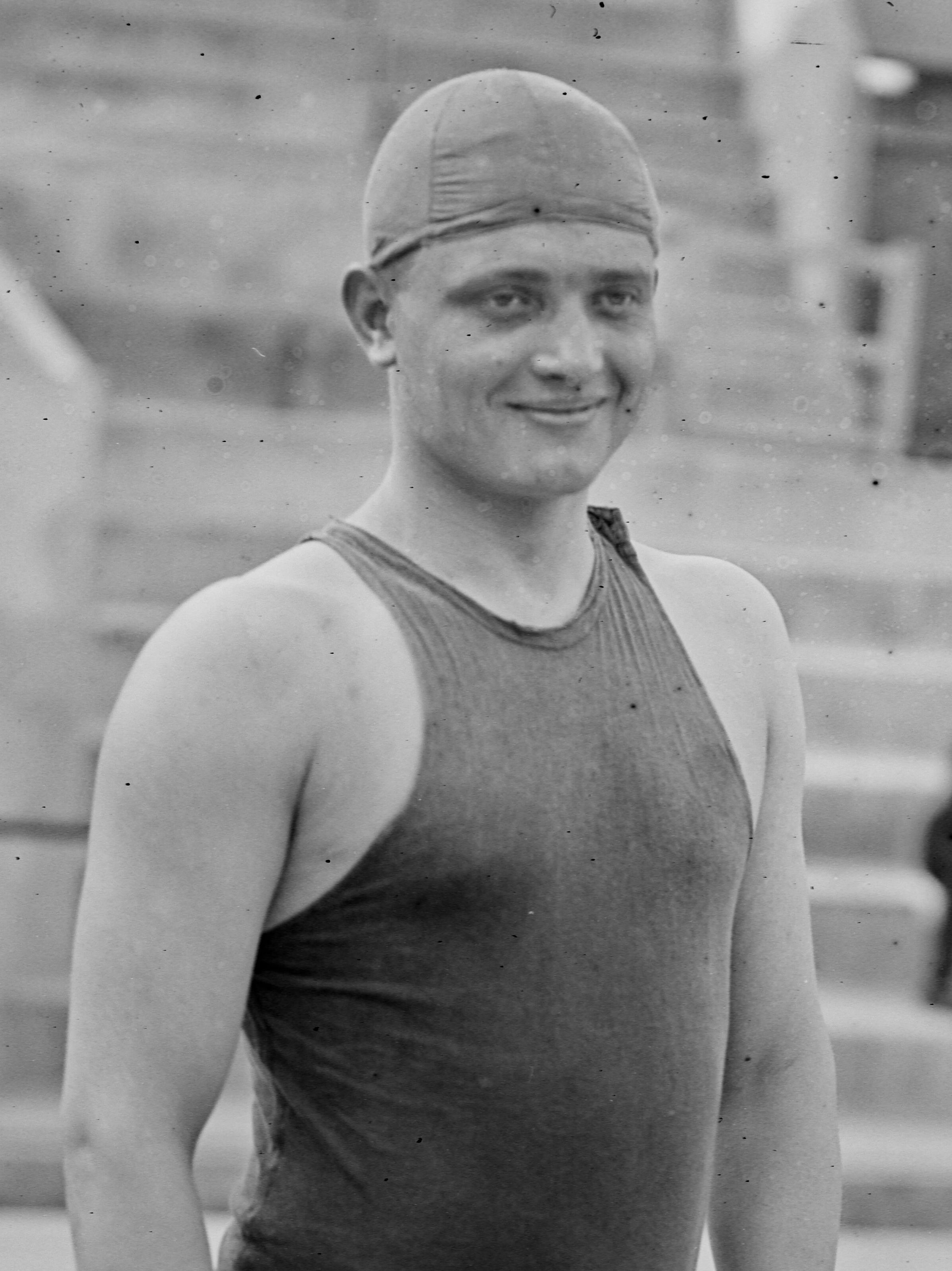
- Robert Desmettre in 1924

Personal information
- Born: 5 August 1901 Neuville-en-Ferrain, France
- Died: 6 March 1936 (aged 34) Tourcoing, France

Sport
- Sport: Water polo
Medal record
Representing France
Olympic Games
Gold medal – first place	1924 Paris	Team competition

Robert Desmettre (5 August 1901 – 6 March 1936) was a French water polo player who competed in the 1924 Summer Olympics. He was part of the French team which won the gold medal. He played all four matches and scored eight goals.

== See also ==
- France men's Olympic water polo team records and statistics
- List of Olympic champions in men's water polo
- List of Olympic medalists in water polo (men)
