= Noël Delberghe =

French water polo player (1897–1965)

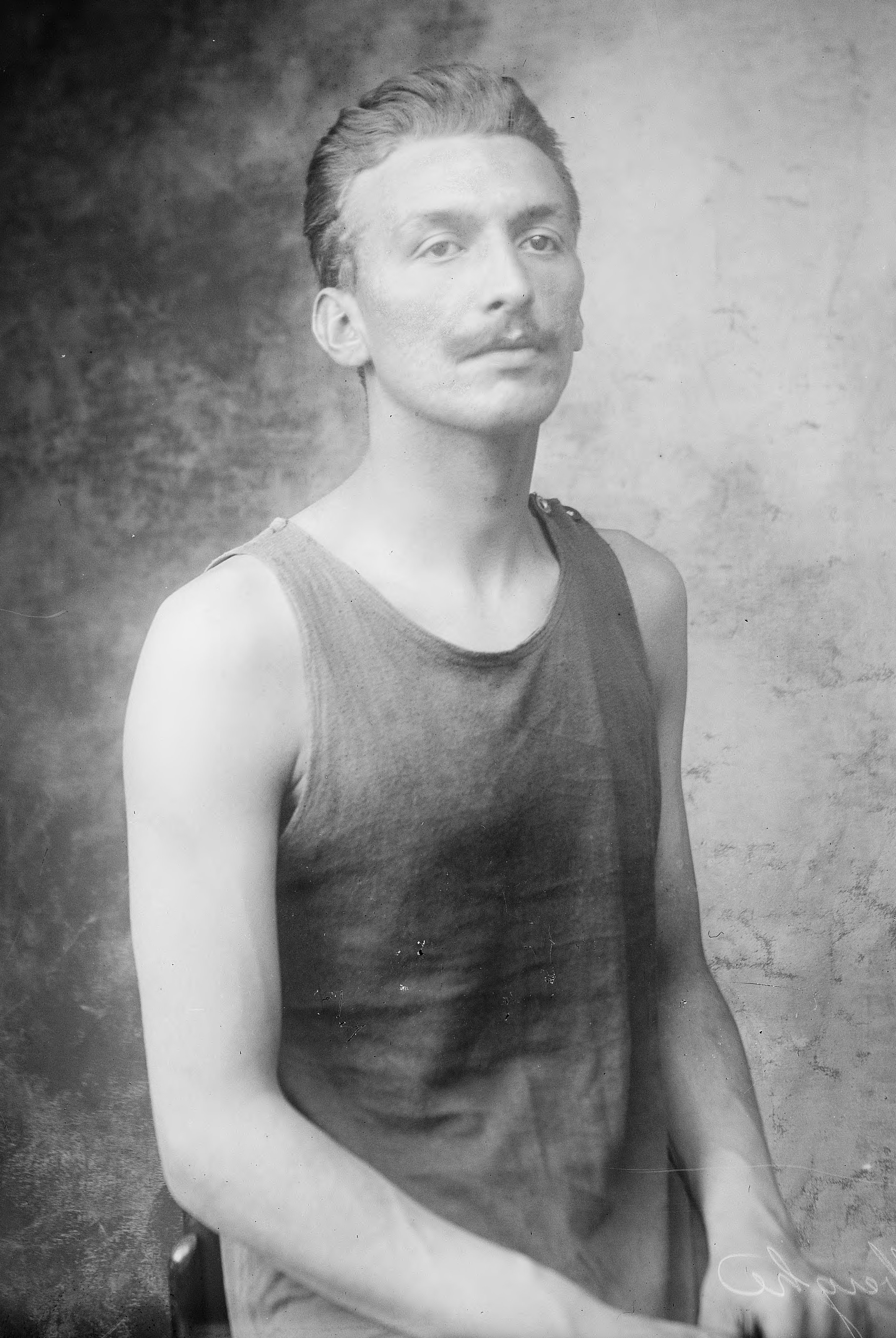
- Delberghe in 1919

Personal information
- Born: 25 December 1897 Tourcoing, France
- Died: 17 September 1965 (aged 67)

Sport
- Sport: Water polo
Medal record
Representing France
Olympic Games
Gold medal – first place	1924 Paris	Team competition

Noël Delberghe (25 December 1897 – 17 September 1965) was a French water polo player who competed in the 1924 Summer Olympics. He was part of the French team which won the gold medal. He played all four matches and scored one goal.

== See also ==
- France men's Olympic water polo team records and statistics
- List of Olympic champions in men's water polo
- List of Olympic medalists in water polo (men)
