= Georges Delporte =

French water polo player (1912–1994)

Personal information
- Nationality: France
- Born: 10 August 1912 Tourcoing, France
- Died: 1 October 1994 (aged 82) Tourcoing, France

Sport
- Sport: Water polo

Senior clubs
- Years: Team
- –: EN Tourcoing
National team
- Years: Team
- ?-?: France

Georges Delporte (10 August 1912 – 1 October 1994) was a French male water polo player. He was a member of the France men's national water polo team. He competed with the team at the 1936 Summer Olympics.

== See also ==
- France men's Olympic water polo team records and statistics
- List of men's Olympic water polo tournament goalkeepers
