= Albert Deborgies =

French water polo player (1902–1984)

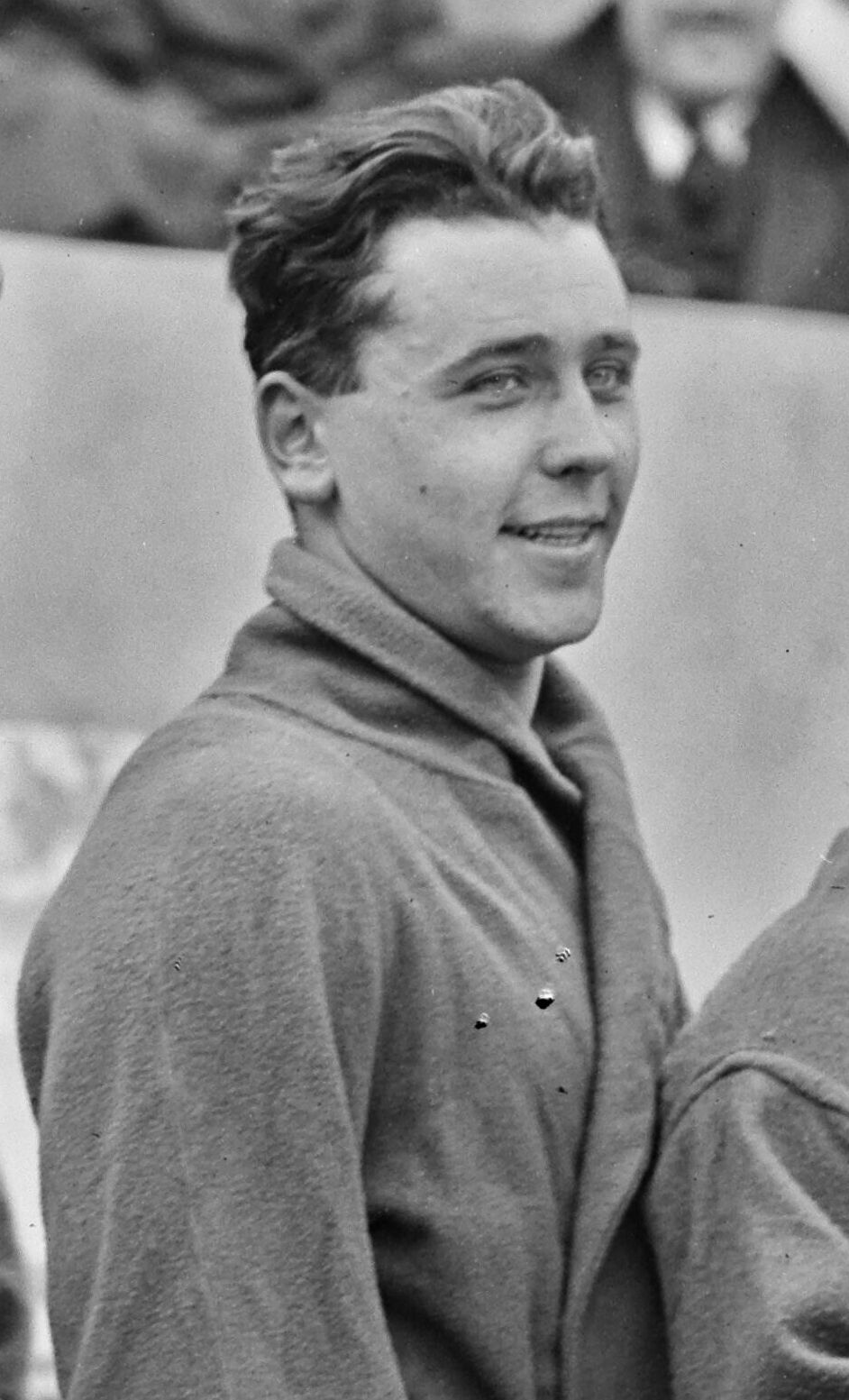
- Albert Deborgies in 1925

Personal information
- Born: 6 July 1902 Tourcoing
- Died: 6 June 1984 (aged 81)
Medal record
Men's water polo
Representing France
Olympic Games
Gold medal – first place	1924 Paris	Team competition

Albert Deborgies (6 July 1902 – 6 June 1984) was a French water polo player who competed in the 1924 Summer Olympics. He was part of the French team which won the gold medal. He played all four matches.

== See also ==
- France men's Olympic water polo team records and statistics
- List of Olympic champions in men's water polo
- List of Olympic medalists in water polo (men)
