= Roland Moellé =

French water polo player (born 1940)

Personal information
- Nationality: French
- Born: 29 April 1940 (age 85); Saint-Dié-des-Vosges, France

Sport
- Sport: Water polo

Roland Moellé (born 29 April 1940) is a French water polo player. He competed in the men's tournament at the 1960 Summer Olympics.

== See also ==
- France men's Olympic water polo team records and statistics
- List of men's Olympic water polo tournament goalkeepers
