= René Massol =

French water polo player (1927–2010)

Personal information
- Nationality: French
- Born: 29 June 1927; Aubervilliers, Seine-Saint-Denis, France
- Died: 15 December 2010 (aged 83); Sully-sur-Loire, Loiret, France

Sport
- Sport: Water polo

Raymond Charles Massol (29 June 1927 – 15 December 2010) was a French water polo player. He competed in the men's tournament at the 1948 Summer Olympics.

== See also ==
- France men's Olympic water polo team records and statistics
- List of men's Olympic water polo tournament goalkeepers
