= Jean Thorailler =

French water polo player (1888–1957)

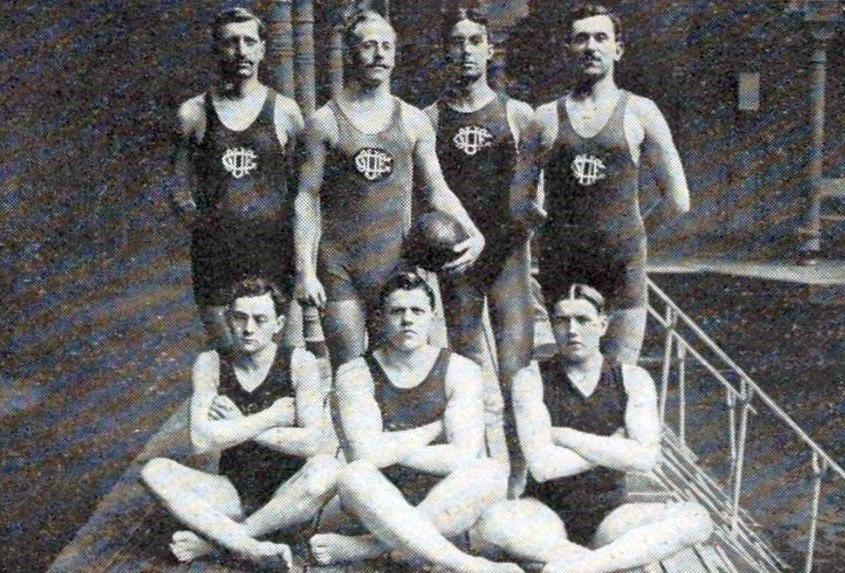

Personal information
- Full name: Jean Raymond Henri Thorailler
- Nationality: French
- Born: 7 January 1888 Épernay, France
- Died: 26 January 1957 (aged 69)

Sport
- Sport: Water polo
National team
- Years: Team
- ?-?: France

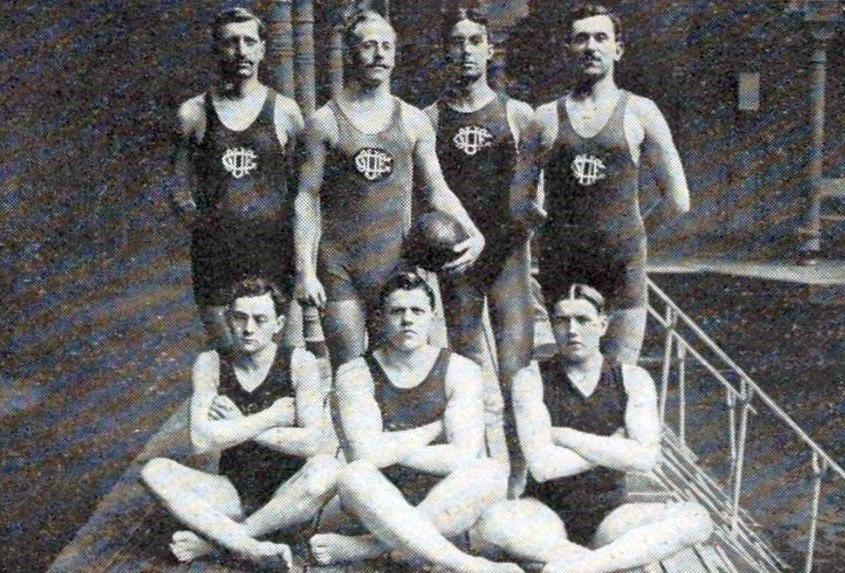
The S.C.U.F. water polo team in 1919.

Jean Raymond Henri Thorailler (7 January 1888 – 26 January 1957) was a French male water polo player. He was a member of the France men's national water polo team. He competed with the team at the 1912 Summer Olympics and 1920 Summer Olympics. Thorailler was given the honour to carry the national flag of France during the opening ceremony of the 1928 Summer Olympics in Amsterdam, becoming the fourth water polo player to be a flag bearer at the opening and closing ceremonies of the Olympics.

== See also ==
- France men's Olympic water polo team records and statistics
- List of men's Olympic water polo tournament goalkeepers
