= Albert Mayaud =

French water polo player (1899–1987)

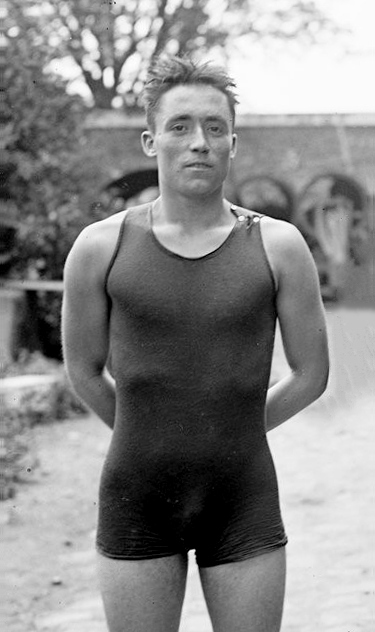
- Albert Mayaud in 1920

Personal information
- Born: 31 March 1899 Paris, France
- Died: 14 August 1987 (aged 88) Paris, France

Sport
- Sport: Water polo, swimming
- Club: Libellule de Paris
Medal record
Olympic Games
Water polo
Representing France
Gold medal – first place	1924 Paris	Team competition

Albert Mayaud (31 March 1899 – 14 August 1987) was a French water polo player and freestyle swimmer who competed at the 1920 and 1924 Summer Olympics.

In 1920, Mayaud was eliminated in the first round of the water polo tournament and the 4×200 metre freestyle swimming event. Four years later, at the Paris Games, he won the gold medal with the French water polo team. He played all four matches and scored three goals.

== See also ==
- France men's Olympic water polo team records and statistics
- List of Olympic champions in men's water polo
- List of Olympic medalists in water polo (men)
