= François Désbonnet =

French water polo player (1920–2003)

Personal information
- Nationality: French
- Born: 29 September 1920
- Died: 7 February 2003 (aged 82)

Sport
- Sport: Water polo

François Désbonnet (29 September 1920 – 7 February 2003) was a French water polo player. He competed in the men's tournament at the 1948 Summer Olympics.

== See also ==
- France men's Olympic water polo team records and statistics
- List of men's Olympic water polo tournament goalkeepers
