= Paul Dujardin (water polo) =

French water polo player (1894–1959)

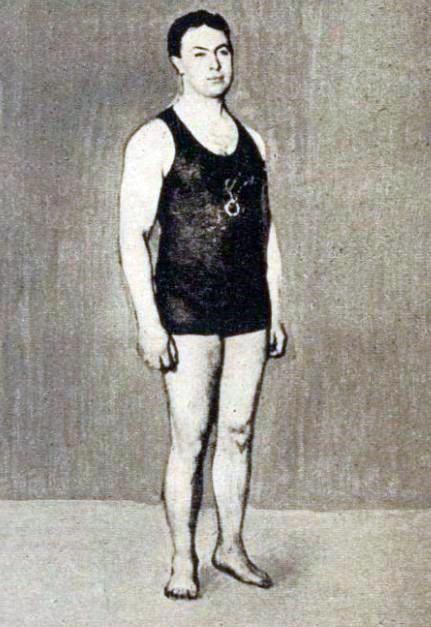
- Paul Dujardin in 1923

Personal information
- Born: May 10, 1894 Tourcoing, France
- Died: April 17, 1959 (aged 64) Coulon, France

Sport
- Sport: Water polo
Medal record
Representing France
Olympic Games
Gold medal – first place	1924 Paris	Team competition
Bronze medal – third place	1928 Amsterdam	Team competition

Paul L. Dujardin (French pronunciation: [pɔl dyʒaʁdɛ̃]; 10 May 1894 – 17 April 1959) was a French water polo player who competed in the 1924 and 1928 Summer Olympics. In 1924 he was part of the French team which won the gold medal. He played all four matches as goalkeeper. Four years later he was a member of the French team, which won the bronze medal. He played all six matches as goalkeeper.

== See also ==
- France men's Olympic water polo team records and statistics
- List of Olympic champions in men's water polo
- List of Olympic medalists in water polo (men)
- List of men's Olympic water polo tournament goalkeepers
