= Émile Écuyer =

French discus thrower (1881–1952)

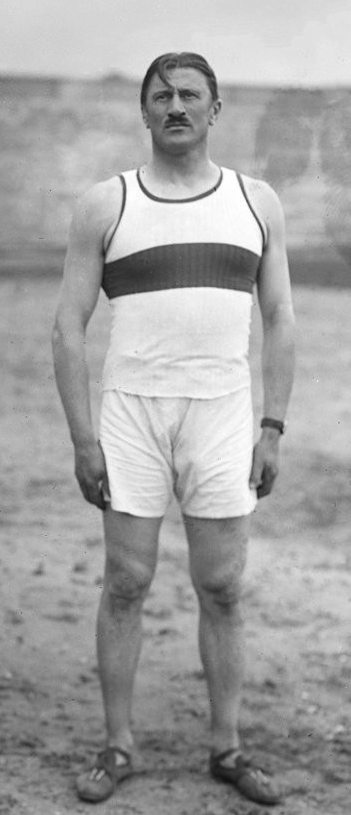
- Émile Écuyer in 1920

Personal information
- Born: 18 April 1881 Corveissiat, France
- Died: 8 July 1952 (aged 71) Oyonnax, France

Sport
- Sport: Athletics
- Event: Discus throw
- Club: Club Sportive Oyonnax

Achievements and titles
- Personal best: 41.61 m (1921)

Émile Gustave Écuyer (18 April 1881 – 8 July 1952) was a French discus thrower. He competed at the 1920 Summer Olympics and placed 14th, and also served as the Olympic flag bearer for France.
