= Gérard Faetibolt =

French water polo player (1932–2023)

Personal information
- Nationality: French
- Born: 23 March 1932 Colmar, France
- Died: 14 January 2023 (aged 90) Colmar, France

Sport
- Sport: Water polo

Gérard Faetibold (sometimes spelled Faetibolt; 23 March 1932 – 14 January 2023) was a French water polo player. He competed in the men's tournament at the 1960 Summer Olympics. Faetibold died on 14 January 2023, at the age of 90.

== See also ==
- France men's Olympic water polo team records and statistics
- List of men's Olympic water polo tournament goalkeepers
