= Vidor (surname) =

Vidor is a surname of multiple origins. Notable people with the surname include:

- Andor Vidor (1912–1943), Hungarian cinematographer
- Charles Vidor, Hungarian film director
- Florence Vidor
- Hilla Vidor, Israeli actress
- King Vidor, American film director
- Giuseppe (Bepi) Vidor, Italian aircraft designer of Asso Aerei aircraft
- Vuk Vidor, French-Serbian artist

== See also ==
- Widor
