= Peter Mesiarik =

Slovak handball player (born 1963)

Peter Mesiarik (born 8 December 1963 in Myjava) is a Slovak former handball player who competed in the 1988 Summer Olympics and in the 1992 Summer Olympics. Peter is head coach of women's handball team of SC Freising playing in Bayernliga. He lives in Freising and has two grown up children. His son Peter Mesiarik junior is playing successfully for MTV Ingolstadt.
