= Tomáš Kubíček =

Czech fencer

Personal information
- Born: 29 July 1962 (age 63) Karlovy Vary, Czechoslovakia

Sport
- Sport: Fencing

Tomáš Kubíček (born 29 July 1962) is a Czech fencer. He competed in the team épée event at the 1992 Summer Olympics.
