= Stade Marcel-Tribut =

Stadium in Dunkirk, France

- Stade Tribut
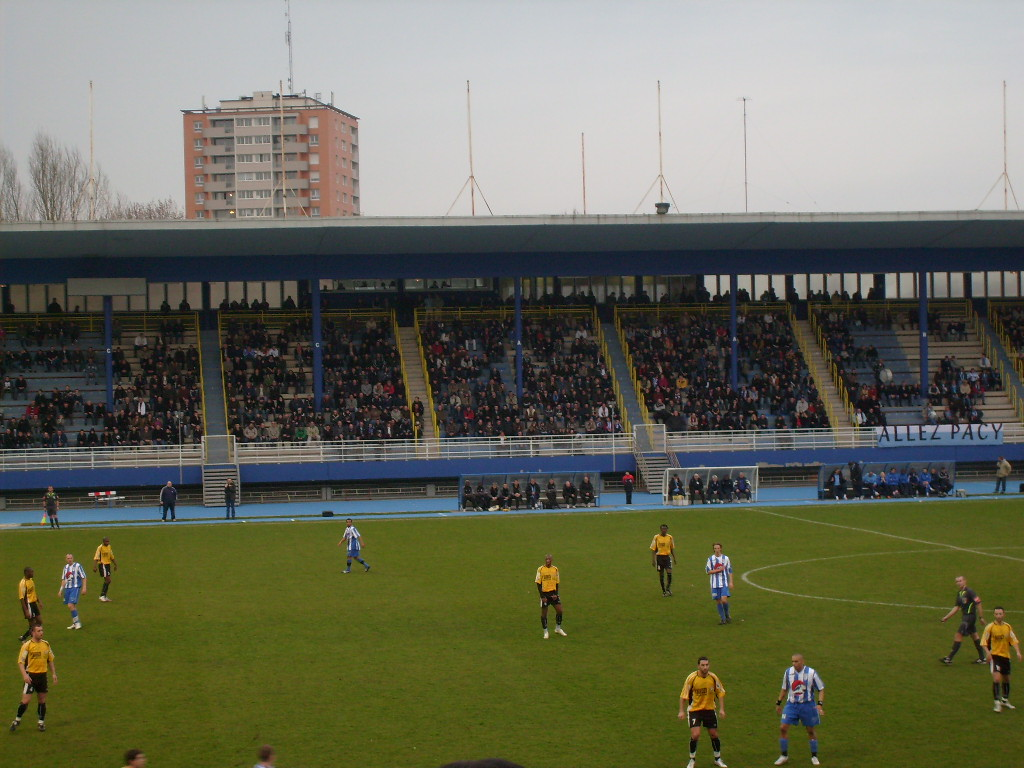
- Interactive map of Stade Marcel-Tribut
- Location: 267 Avenue de Rosendaël; 59240 Dunkirk, Hauts-de-France, France
- Coordinates: 51°02′08″N 2°23′25″E
- Owner: City of Dunkirk
- Capacity: 4,933
- Surface: Grass

Construction
- Opened: 1933
- Renovated: 1957–1967, 2018–2022

Tenant
- USL Dunkerque

The Stade Marcel-Tribut is a multi-purpose stadium in Dunkirk, France. It is the home ground of Ligue 2 club USL Dunkerque.

== Gallery ==
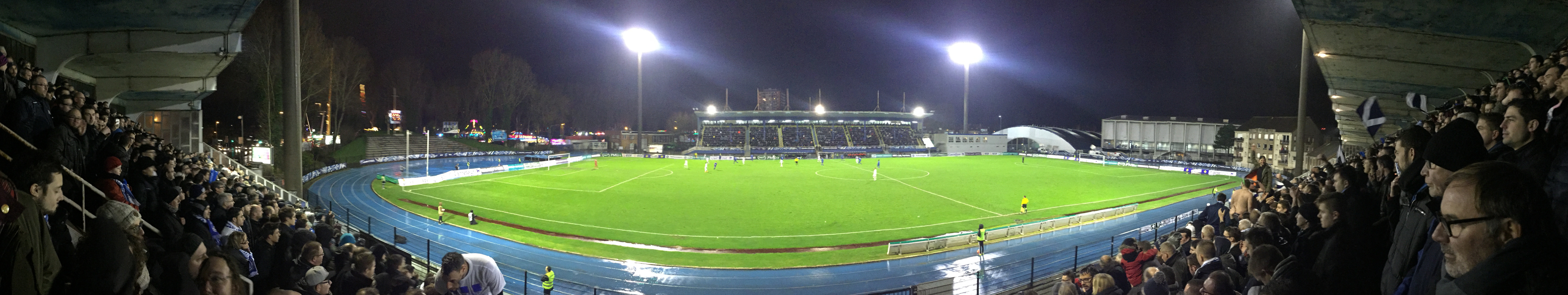
Panorama view of the Stade Marcel-Tribut during a Coupe de France match between USL Dunkerque and ES Troyes AC, 2 January 2016
