= Patrik Hrdina =

Czech windsurfer

Personal information
- Nationality: Czech
- Born: 15 May 1967 (age 57); Prague, Czechoslovakia

Sport
- Sport: Windsurfing

Patrik Hrdina (born 15 May 1967) is a Czech windsurfer. He competed at the 1992 Summer Olympics and the 1996 Summer Olympics.
