= Guillermo Martínez Luis =

Cuban water polo player (born 1968)

Personal information
- Nationality: Cuban
- Born: 26 May 1968 (age 56)

Sport
- Sport: Water polo

Guillermo Martínez Luis (born 26 May 1968) is a Cuban water polo player. He competed in the men's tournament at the 1992 Summer Olympics.
