= Ján Sedláček =

Slovak handball player (born 1968)

Ján Sedláček (born 14 August 1968 in Prešov) is a Slovak former handball player who competed in the 1992 Summer Olympics on the behalf of Czechoslovakia, he was 194 cm / 94 kg or 6.36 ft / 207.23 lb
