= Ľuboš Hudák =

Slovak handball player (born 1968)

Personal information
- Born: 4 November 1968 (age 57) Detva, Czechoslovakia
- Height: 180 cm (5 ft 11 in)

Sport
- Sport: Handball

Ľuboš Hudák (born 4 November 1968) is a Slovak former handball player who competed in the 1992 Summer Olympics.

Hudák was born in Detva. At the 1992 Games he played for Czechoslovakia in the men's tournament, where the team finished ninth.
