= Pavel Sokol =

Czech footballer

Personal information
- Full name: Pavel Sokol
- Date of birth: 7 July 1996 (age 30)
- Place of birth: Chrudim
- Position: Left midfielder

Team information
- Current team: Prostějov (on loan from Líšeň)
- Number: 8

Youth career
- 2002−2012: Chrudim
- 2012−2016: Zbrojovka Brno

Senior career*
Years	Team	Apps	(Gls)
2016−18	Zbrojovka Brno	0	(0)
2017	→ Znojmo (loan)	3	(0)
2017–2018	→ Pardubice (loan)	24	(0)
2018–2022	Pardubice	37	(1)
2020	→ Petržalka (loan)	1	(0)
2020–2022	→ Chrudim (loan)	47	(0)
2022–	Artis Brno	85	(8)
2026–	→ Prostějov (loan)	11	(0)
- * Club domestic league appearances and goals as of 28 May 2026

Pavel Sokol (born 7 July 1996) is a Czech footballer who currently plays as a left midfielder for Prostějov, on loan from Artis Brno.

== Club career ==
=== FC Zbrojovka Brno ===
Since the summer of 2016 he was a member of the U21 team.

=== 1. SC Znojmo ===
He made his professional debut for Znojmo in the away match against Vítkovice on 8 April 2017, which ended in a loss 0:3.

=== FK Pardubice ===
In the summer of 2017, Sokol completed a loan move to Pardubice. He played 24 times that season, mostly off the bench, which earned him a permanent move that was announced on 17 June 2018.
