= Bohumír Prokop =

Czech handball player

Bohumír Prokop (born 4 August 1968) is a Czech former handball player who competed in the 1992 Summer Olympics.
