= Peter Kalafut =

Slovak handball player (born 1960)

Peter Kalafut (born 19 October 1960 in Kežmarok) is a Slovak former handball player who competed in the 1992 Summer Olympics.
