= Michal Franc =

Czech fencer

Personal information
- Born: 2 November 1967 (age 58) Karlovy Vary, Czechoslovakia

Sport
- Sport: Fencing

Michal Franc (born 2 November 1967) is a Czech fencer. He competed in the team épée event at the 1992 Summer Olympics.
