= Milan Foľta =

Slovak handball player (born 1960)

Milan Folta (born 7 November 1960 in Prešov) is a Slovak former handball player who competed in the 1988 Summer Olympics and in the 1992 Summer Olympics.
