= Peter Kakaščík =

Slovak handball player (born 1963)

Peter Kakaščík (born 4 December 1963 in Prešov) is a Slovak former handball player who competed in the 1992 Summer Olympics.
