= Jean-Marie Olivon =

French water polo player (born 1967)

Personal information
- Nationality: French
- Born: 2 February 1967 (age 58); Marseille, France

Sport
- Sport: Water polo

Jean-Marie Olivon (born 2 February 1967) is a French former water polo player. He competed in the men's tournament at the 1992 Summer Olympics.

== See also ==
- France men's Olympic water polo team records and statistics
- List of men's Olympic water polo tournament goalkeepers
