= Andrej Kastelic =

Slovenian handball player

Andrej Kastelic (born 6 April 1971 in Ljubljana) is a Slovenian handball player who competed in the 2000 Summer Olympics and in the 2004 Summer Olympics.
