= List of flag bearers for France at the Olympics =

France at the Olympics
- IOC code: FRA
- NOC: French National Olympic and Sports Committee
- Website: www.franceolympique.com (in French)
- Medals: Gold 289 Silver 328 Bronze 360 Total 977

Summer appearances
- 1896; 1900; 1904; 1908; 1912; 1920; 1924; 1928; 1932; 1936; 1948; 1952; 1956; 1960; 1964; 1968; 1972; 1976; 1980; 1984; 1988; 1992; 1996; 2000; 2004; 2008; 2012; 2016; 2020; 2024

Winter appearances
- 1924; 1928; 1932; 1936; 1948; 1952; 1956; 1960; 1964; 1968; 1972; 1976; 1980; 1984; 1988; 1992; 1994; 1998; 2002; 2006; 2010; 2014; 2018; 2022; 2026

Other related appearances
- 1906 Intercalated Games

This is a list of flag bearers who have represented France at the Olympics.

Flag bearers carry the national flag of their country at the opening ceremony of the Olympic Games.

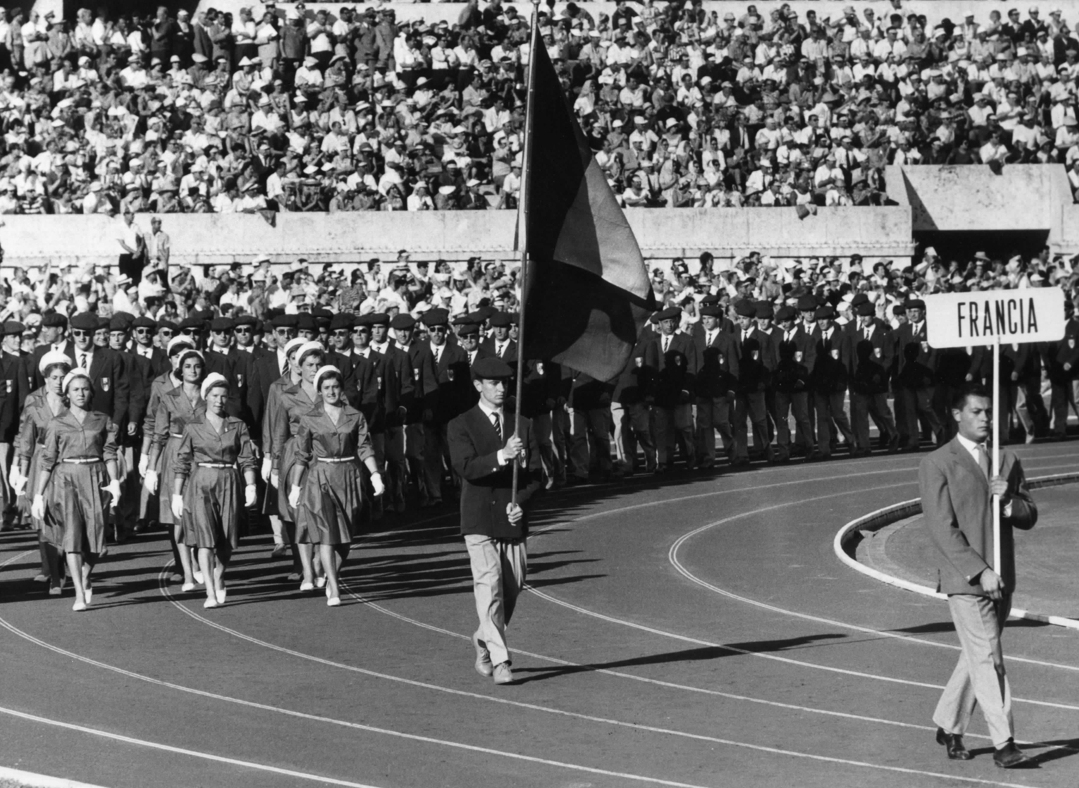
Christian d'Oriola carrying French flag at the 1960 Olympics

#	Event year	Season	Flag bearer	Sport
1	1908	Summer	Émile Demangel	Track cycling
2	1912	Summer	Raoul Paoli	Athletics
3	1920	Summer	Émile Écuyer	Athletics
4	1924	Winter	Camille Mandrillon	Biathlon
5	1924	Summer	Géo André	Athletics
6	1928	Summer	Jean Thorailler	Water polo
7	1932	Winter	Georges Torchon	Figure skating
8	1932	Summer	Jules Noël	Athletics
9	1936	Summer	Jules Noël	Athletics
10	1948	Winter	James Couttet	Alpine skiing
11	1948	Summer	Jean Séphériadès	Rowing
12	1952	Winter	Alain Giletti	Figure skating
13	1952	Summer	Ignace Heinrich	Athletics
14	1956	Winter	James Couttet	Alpine skiing
15	1956	Summer	Jean Debuf	Weightlifting
16	1960	Winter	Benoît Carrara	Cross-country skiing
17	1960	Summer	Christian d'Oriola	Fencing
18	1964	Winter	Alain Calmat	Figure skating
19	1964	Summer	Michel Macquet	Athletics
20	1968	Winter	Gilbert Poirot	Ski jumping
21	1968	Summer	Kiki Caron	Swimming
22	1972	Winter	Patrick Péra	Figure skating
23	1972	Summer	Jean-Claude Magnan	Fencing
24	1976	Winter	Danièle Debernard	Alpine skiing
25	1976	Summer	Daniel Morelon	Track cycling
26	1980	Winter	Fabienne Serrat	Alpine skiing
27	1984	Winter	Yvon Mougel	Biathlon
28	1984	Summer	Angelo Parisi	Judo
29	1988	Winter	Catherine Quittet	Alpine skiing
30	1988	Summer	Philippe Riboud	Fencing
31	1992	Winter	Fabrice Guy	Nordic combined
32	1992	Summer	Jean-François Lamour	Fencing
33	1994	Winter	Anne Briand-Bouthiaux	Biathlon
34	1996	Summer	Marie-José Pérec	Athletics
35	1998	Winter	Philippe Candeloro	Figure skating
36	2000	Summer	David Douillet	Judo
37	2002	Winter	Carole Montillet-Carles	Alpine skiing
38	2004	Summer	Jackson Richardson	Handball
39	2006	Winter	Bruno Mingeon	Bobsleigh
40	2008	Summer	Tony Estanguet	Canoe racing
41	2010	Winter	Vincent Defrasne	Biathlon
42	2012	Summer	Laura Flessel-Colovic	Fencing
43	2014	Winter	Jason Lamy-Chappuis	Nordic combined
44	2016	Summer	Teddy Riner	Judo
45	2018	Winter	Martin Fourcade	Biathlon
46	2020	Summer	Clarisse Agbegnenou	Judo
46	2020	Summer	Samir Aït Saïd	Gymnastics
47	2022	Winter	Kevin Rolland	Freestyle skiing
47	2022	Winter	Tessa Worley	Alpine skiing
48	2024	Summer	Florent Manaudou	Swimming
48	2024	Summer	Mélina Robert-Michon	Athletics

== See also ==
- France at the Olympics
