= Christophe Gautier =

French water polo player (born 1966)

Personal information
- Nationality: French
- Born: 16 April 1966 (age 59); Choisy-le-Roi, France

Sport
- Sport: Water polo

Christophe Gautier (born 16 April 1966) is a French former water polo player. He competed in the men's tournament at the 1992 Summer Olympics.

== See also ==
- France men's Olympic water polo team records and statistics
- List of men's Olympic water polo tournament goalkeepers
