= Martin Bačík (footballer, born 1989) =

Czech footballer (born 1989)

Personal information
- Date of birth: 24 January 1989 (age 37)
- Place of birth: Czechoslovakia
- Height: 1.86 m (6 ft 1 in)
- Position: Forward

Team information
- Current team: FC Tescoma Zlín
- Number: 24

Senior career*
Years	Team	Apps	(Gls)
2007–	Zlín	46	(7)

International career^{‡}
2004	Czech Republic U16	2	(0)
2007	Czech Republic U18	2	(0)
2008	Czech Republic U19	1	(0)
- * Club domestic league appearances and goals as of 31 December 2011 ‡ National team caps and goals as of 31 December 2011

Martin Bačík (born 24 January 1989) is a Czech professional football player who currently plays for FC Tescoma Zlín. He has represented his country at youth level.
