= Miroslav Jančich =

Slovak water polo player (born 1968)

Personal information
- Nationality: Slovak
- Born: 14 July 1968 (age 56); Bojnice, Czechoslovakia

Sport
- Sport: Water polo

Miroslav Jančich (born 14 July 1968) is a Slovak water polo player. He competed in the men's tournament at the 1992 Summer Olympics.
