= Štefan Kmeťo =

Slovak water polo player (born 1960)

Personal information
- Nationality: Slovak
- Born: 26 December 1960 (age 64); Topoľčany, Czechoslovakia

Sport
- Sport: Water polo

Štefan Kmeťo (born 26 December 1960) is a Slovak water polo player. He competed in the men's tournament at the 1992 Summer Olympics.
