= Tomáš Bundschuh =

Slovak water polo player (born 1965)

Personal information
- Nationality: Slovak
- Born: 31 December 1965 (age 59); Košice, Czechoslovakia

Sport
- Sport: Water polo

Tomáš Bundschuh (born 31 December 1965) is a Slovak water polo player. He competed in the men's tournament at the 1992 Summer Olympics.
