= Martin Šetlík =

Czech handball player

Martin Šetlík (born 12 August 1969, in Plzeň) is a Czech former handball player who competed in the 1992 Summer Olympics.
