= Ladislav Vidumanský =

Slovak water polo player (born 1961)

Personal information
- Nationality: Slovak
- Born: 9 July 1961 (age 63); Košice, Czechoslovakia

Sport
- Sport: Water polo

Ladislav Vidumanský (born 9 July 1961) is a Slovak water polo player. He competed in the men's tournament at the 1992 Summer Olympics.
