= Peter Horňák =

Slovak water polo player (born 1964)

Personal information
- Nationality: Slovak
- Born: 24 May 1964 (age 60); Bratislava, Czechoslovakia

Sport
- Sport: Water polo

Peter Horňák (born 24 May 1964) is a Slovak water polo player. He competed in the men's tournament at the 1992 Summer Olympics.
