= Michal Tonar =

Czech handball player

Michal Tonar (born 23 September 1969 in Plzeň) is a Czech former handball player who competed in the 1992 Summer Olympics.
