= Eduard Balúch =

Slovak water polo player (born 1971)

Personal information
- Nationality: Slovak
- Born: 30 June 1971 (age 53); Bojnice, Czechoslovakia

Sport
- Sport: Water polo

Eduard Balúch (born 30 June 1971) is a Slovak water polo player. He competed in the men's tournament at the 1992 Summer Olympics.
