= Roman Polačik =

Slovak water polo player (born 1963)

Personal information
- Nationality: Slovak
- Born: 24 August 1963 (age 61); Piešťany, Czechoslovakia

Sport
- Sport: Water polo

Roman Polačik (born 24 August 1963) is a Slovak water polo player. He competed in the men's tournament at the 1992 Summer Olympics.
