= Roman Bačík =

Slovak water polo player (born 1959)

Personal information
- Nationality: Slovak
- Born: 27 May 1959 (age 65); Piešťany, Czechoslovakia

Sport
- Sport: Water polo

Roman Bačík (born 27 May 1959) is a Slovak water polo player. He competed in the men's tournament at the 1992 Summer Olympics.
