= Vidor Borsig =

Slovak water polo player (born 1963)

Personal information
- Nationality: Slovak
- Born: 11 February 1963 (age 62); Bratislava, Czechoslovakia

Sport
- Sport: Water polo

Vidor Borsig (born 11 February 1963) is a Slovak water polo player. He competed in the men's tournament at the 1992 Summer Olympics.
