= List of flag bearers for the Maldives at the Olympics =

Maldives at the Olympics
- Flag of Maldives
- IOC code: MDV
- NOC: Maldives Olympic Committee
- Website: www.olympic.mv
- Medals: Gold 0 Silver 0 Bronze 0 Total 0

Summer appearances
- 1988; 1992; 1996; 2000; 2004; 2008; 2012; 2016; 2020; 2024

This is a list of flag bearers who have represented the Maldives at the Olympics.

Flag bearers carry the national flag of their country at the opening ceremony of the Olympic Games.

#	Event year	Season	Flag bearer	Sport
1	1988	Summer	Hussein Haleem	Athletics
2	1992	Summer		
3	1996	Summer	Ahmed Shageef	Athletics
4	2000	Summer	Naseer Ismail	Athletics
5	2004	Summer	Sultan Saeed	Athletics
6	2008	Summer	Aminath Rouya Hussain	Swimming
7	2012	Summer	Mohamed Ajfan Rasheed	Badminton
8	2016	Summer	Aminath Shajan	Swimming
9	2020	Summer	Fathimath Nabaaha Abdul Razzaq	Badminton
9	2020	Summer	Mubal Azzam Ibrahim	Swimming
10	2024	Summer	Ibadulla Adam	Athletics
10	2024	Summer	Fathimath Al	Table tennis

== See also ==
- Maldives at the Olympics
