= Maldives at the Olympics =

- Flag of Maldives
- IOC code: MDV
- NOC: Maldives Olympic Committee
- Website: www.olympic.mv
- Medals: Gold 0 Silver 0 Bronze 0 Total 0

Summer appearances
- 1988; 1992; 1996; 2000; 2004; 2008; 2012; 2016; 2020; 2024; 2028

The Maldives first participated at the Olympic Games in 1988. It has sent athletes to compete in every Summer Olympic Games since, but has not participated in the Winter Olympic Games.

The National Olympic Committee for Maldives was created in 1985 and recognized by the International Olympic Committee that same year. Maldives entered the Olympics for the first time at the 1988 Summer Olympics in Seoul, South Korea, with seven athletes in the men's 100-metre, 200-metre and 400-metre sprints, men's marathon and men's 4 × 100 metre relay. As of 2024, the Maldives has not won any medals at the Olympics.

== National Olympic Committee ==
The Maldives Olympic Committee was formed in 1985, and was recognized by the International Olympic Committee the same year. The MOE organizes the Maldives' participation in the Asian Games, Commonwealth Games and South Asian Games. The current secretary general of the committee is Thamooh Ahmed Saeed, and Mohamed Abdul Sattar is the president.

== Olympics overview ==
=== 1988 Summer Olympics ===
The Maldives debuted at the 1988 Summer Olympics in Seoul, South Korea, with seven athletes competing in athletics. Ismail Asif Waheed took part in the 100 and 200 metres but failed to advance to the next round. Ahmed Shageef ran the 400 metres with a time of 50.61 seconds, finishing 67th overall and failing to advance to the semi finals. Two sprinters, Abdul Haji Abdul Latheef and Hussein Haleem, participated in the men's marathon. Both athletes failed to finish the race. The men's 4 × 100 metres relay team consisted of Ismail Asif Waheed, Ibrahim Manik, Abdul Razzak Aboobakur and Mohamed Hanim. They finished the first heat with a time of 44.31 seconds, garnering seventh and last place in the heat. This was not fast enough to advance to the next round.

=== 1992 Summer Olympics ===
The Maldives sent seven athletes to the 1992 Summer Olympics in Barcelona, Spain. Ahmed Shageef, Mohamed Amir, Hussain Riyaz, Hussein Haleem and Aminath Rishtha competed in the track and field events and Ahmed Imthiyaz and Mohamed Rasheed represented the nation in swimming at the Games.

=== 1996 Summer Olympics ===
The Maldivian delegation at the 1996 Games in Atlanta, United States, featured five track and field athletes and one swimmers. Sprinters Mohamed Amir, Naseer Ismail and Hussain Riyaz took part in the men's 400 metres, 800 metres and 1500 meters, respectively. The three along with Ahmed Shageef participated in the men's marathon finishing last and failing to advance to the next round. Yaznee Nasheeda was the only female athlete representing the Maldives at the 1996 games. She took part in the women's 800 metres where she finished last in the heats and failed to qualify for the next round. In swimming Moosa Nazim represented the Maldives in the men's 50 metre freestyle.

=== 2000 Summer Olympics ===
In the 2000 Summer Olympics in Sydney, Australia, the Maldives sent a delegation of two athletes and two swimmers. Sprinters Naseer Ismail and Shamha Ahmed competed in the men's 800 metres and women's 100 metres, respectively. Meanwhile, swimmers Hassan Mubah and Fariha Fathimath took part in the men's 50 metre freestyle and women's 50 metre freestyle.

=== 2004 Summer Olympics ===
The Maldives sent a delegation of two athletes and two swimmers to the 2004 Summer Olympics in Athens, Greece. Athletes Sultan Saeed and Shifana Ali participated in the men's 100 metres and the women's 400 metres, respectively. Shifana would go on to achieve a national record in the 400 metres event with a time of 1 minute and 00.92 seconds. In swimming Hassan Mubah made his second appearance at the Olympics in the men's 50 metre freestyle. Aminath Rouya Hussain took part in the women's 50 metre freestyle.

=== 2008 Summer Olympics ===
The Maldives was represented by two sprinters and two swimmers at the 2008 games in Beijing, China. Sprinter Ali Shareef competing in the men's 100 metres was able to achieve a national record after finishing with a time of 11.11 seconds. Aishath Reesha represented the Maldives at the women's 800 metres. Swimmers Ibrahim Shameel and Aminath Rouya Hussain participated in the men's 50 metre freestyle and women's 50 metre freestyle, respectively.

=== 2012 Summer Olympics ===
The Maldives sent five athletes to the 2012 Summer Olympics in London, United Kingdom. Sprinters Azneem Ahmed and Afa Ismail competed in the men's 100 metres and the women's 100 metres respectively. Azneem went on to achieve a national record with a time of 10.79 seconds. In the badminton event the Maldives was represented by Mohamed Ajfan Rasheed. Ahmed Husam and Aminath Shajan took part in the swimming events.

=== 2016 Summer Olympics ===
Two sprinters and two swimmers represented the Maldives at the 2016 games in Rio de Janeiro, Brazil. Hassan Saaid ranked number one in the first heat of the men's 100 metres and advanced to the second round where he was eliminated after finishing last. Sprinter Afa Ismail achieved a national record in the women's 200 metres. Swimmers Nishwan Ibrahim and Aminath Shajan took part in the men's 50 m freestyle and women's 100 m freestyle, respectively.

=== 2020 Summer Olympics ===
For the 2020 Summer Olympics in Tokyo, Japan, the Maldives sent a delegation of four athletes. The game was delayed to July 2021 due to the COVID-19 pandemic. Sprinter Hassan Saaid competed in the men's 100 metres. Fathimath Nabaaha Abdul Razzaq took part in the women's singles. Swimmers Mubal Azzam Ibrahim and Aishath Sajina competed in the men's 100 metre freestyle and women's 100 metre breaststroke, respectively. None of the athletes made it past the first round of their individual events.

== Medal tables ==
Games	Athletes	Gold	Silver	Bronze	Total	Rank
1988 Seoul	7	0	0	0	0	–
1992 Barcelona	7	0	0	0	0	–
1996 Atlanta	6	0	0	0	0	–
2000 Sydney	4	0	0	0	0	–
2004 Athens	4	0	0	0	0	–
2008 Beijing	4	0	0	0	0	–
2012 London	5	0	0	0	0	–
2016 Rio de Janeiro	4	0	0	0	0	–
2020 Tokyo	4	0	0	0	0	–
2024 Paris	5	0	0	0	0	–
2028 Los Angeles	future event					
2032 Brisbane	future event					
Total		0	0	0	0	–

== Flagbearers ==
Flag bearers carry the national flag of their country at the opening ceremony and closing ceremony of the Olympic Games. The first flag bearer for the Maldives was Hussein Haleem, a sprinter, in 1988.

#	Event year	Season	Flag bearer	Sport	Ref.
9	2020	Summer	Fathimath Nabaaha Abdul Razzaq	Badminton	
9	2020	Summer	Mubal Azzam Ibrahim	Swimming	
8	2016	Summer	Aminath Shajan (opening); Afa Ismail (closing)	Swimming; Athletics	
7	2012	Summer	Mohamed Ajfan Rasheed (opening); Azneem Ahmed (closing)	Badminton; Athletics	
6	2008	Summer	Aminath Rouya Hussain (opening); Ali Shareef (closing)	Swimming; Athletics	
5	2004	Summer	Sultan Saeed (opening); Hassan Mubah (closing)	Athletics; Swimming	
4	2000	Summer	Naseer Ismail	Athletics	
3	1996	Summer	Ahmed Shageef	Athletics	
2	1992	Summer			
1	1988	Summer	Hussein Haleem	Athletics	

== See also ==
- List of Maldivian records in athletics
- List of Maldivian records in swimming
