= Maldives at the 1992 Summer Olympics =

- Flag of Maldives
- IOC code: MDV
- NOC: Maldives Olympic Committee

in Barcelona, Spain 25 July 1992 – 9 August 1992
- Competitors: 7 in 2 sports
- Medals: Gold 0 Silver 0 Bronze 0 Total 0

Summer Olympics appearances (overview)
- 1988; 1992; 1996; 2000; 2004; 2008; 2012; 2016; 2020; 2024; 2028

The Maldives competed at the 1992 Summer Olympics in Barcelona, Spain, from 25 July to 9 August 1992. The delegation's participation in the Barcelona Olympics marked the Maldives' second appearance at the Summer Olympics since their debut at the 1988 Summer Olympics in Seoul, South Korea. Seven athletes competed across two sports; Ahmed Shageef, Mohamed Amir, Hussain Riyaz, Hussein Haleem and Aminath Rishtha in track and field, and Ahmed Imthiyaz and Mohamed Rasheed in swimming. None of the track or swimming athletes advanced past the first round in their events.

== Background ==
The Maldives Olympic Committee was formed in 1985, and was recognized by the International Olympic Committee the same year. The Maldives have participated in every Summer Olympics since its debut in the 1988 Summer Olympics in Seoul. No Maldivian has ever won a medal at the Olympics.

For the 1992 Summer Olympics, the Maldives sent a delegation of seven athletes, their joint highest number of participants. The Maldivian team at the 1992 Games featured five track and field athletes and two swimmers. Sprinters Ahmed Shageef, Mohamed Amir, Hussain Riyaz, Hussein Haleem and Aminath Rishtha were chosen to compete in athletic events. Swimmers Ahmed Imthiyaz and Mohamed Rasheed participated in the men's 50 metre freestyle and men's 100 metre freestyle.

== Athletics ==
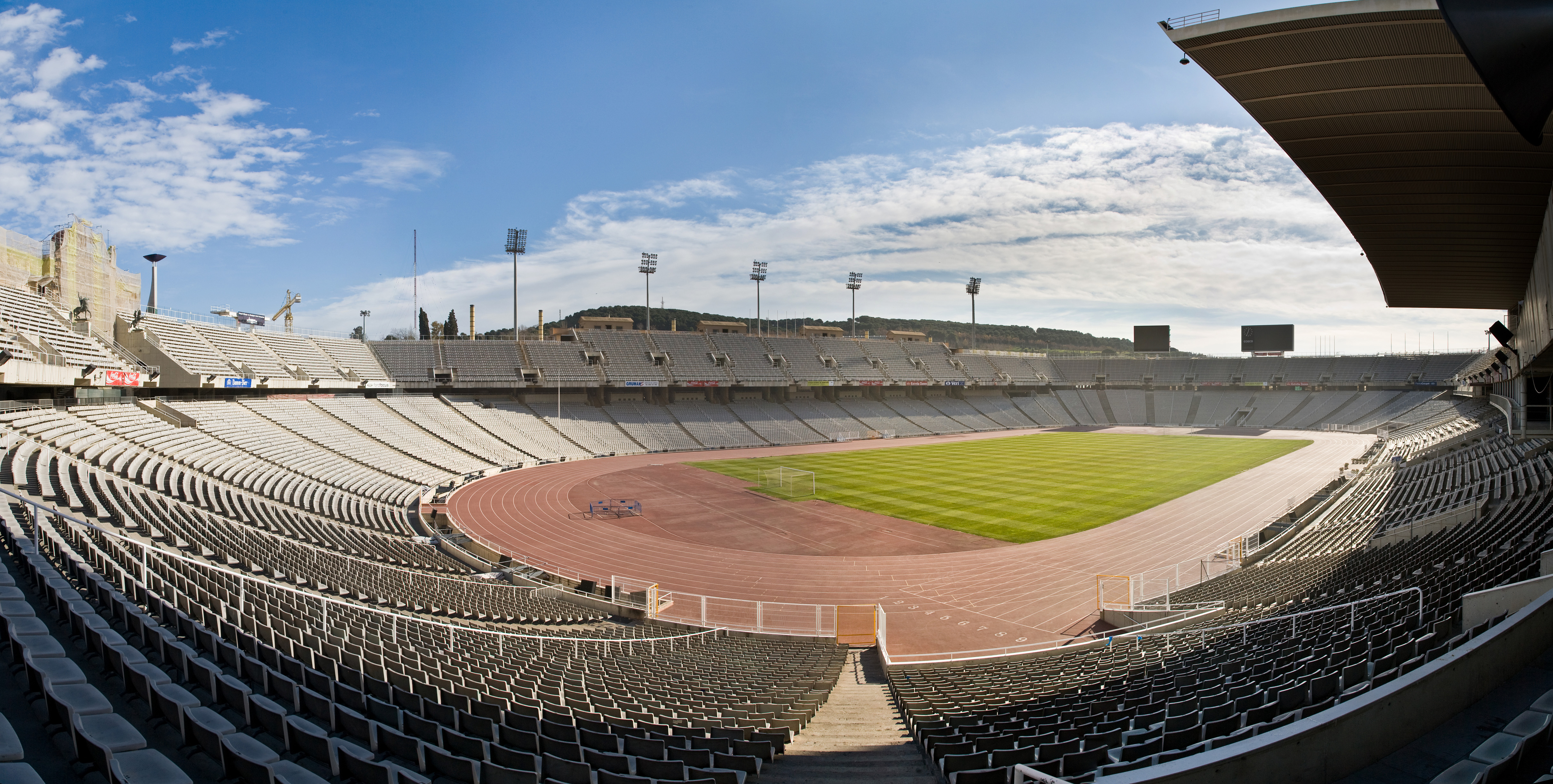
The Estadi Olímpic Lluís Companys where the athletic events took place.

The Maldives was represented by four male athletes and a female athlete at the 1992 Summer Olympics in athletics: Ahmed Shageef, Mohamed Amir, Hussain Riyaz, Hussein Haleem, and Aminath Rishtha. This was the first olympic appearance for Aminath Rishtha, Mohamed Amir and Hussain Riyaz. The latter two would go on to represent the Maldives at the following 1996 games. This was the second Olympic appearance for Ahmed Shageef and Hussein Haleem. Shageef would go on to represent the Maldives at the 1996 games.

Ahmed Shageef competed in the men's 100 metres and the men's 200 metres. He had previously participated in the 1988 games in Seoul, South Korea and he was the only athlete to participate in two athletic events at the 1992 games. In the men's 100 metres event he was drawn in heat six on 31 July. He finished last out of the eight athletes in his heat, failing to advance to the next round. Overall, he finished 73rd of the 78 athletes that finished. (Note: One athlete, Andreas Berger, was disqualified and two athletes, Charles Tayot and Patrice Traoré Zeba, did not finish.) On 3 August, he took part in the men's 200 metres event and was drawn in heat ten. He finished seventh and last in his heat with a time of 22.54 seconds and did not qualify for later rounds. Overall, he placed 75th out of 77 athletes that finished. (Note: One athlete, Jean-Charles Trouabal, did not finish and another, Juan Vicente Matala, was disqualified. Two athletes, Fletcher Wamilee and Afonso Ferraz, did not start.)

Mohamed Amir competed in the men's 400 metres on 1 August. He was drawn in heat four and finished last out of the eight athletes in his heat with a time of 50.35 seconds, failing to advance to the next round. Overall, he finished 62nd out of 66 athletes that finished. (Note: One athlete, Desai Wynter, did not finish. One athlete, Lamin Marikong, was disqualified. One athlete, Michael Williams, did not start.)

Hussain Riyaz competed in the men's 800 metres on 1 August, where he finished last out of the eight athletes in his heat, failing to advance to the next round. Overall, he finished 56th out of 57 athletes with a time of 2 minutes and 0.93 seconds. (Note: Two athletes, Idrissou Tamimou and John Palacio, was disqualified. Two athletes, Giuseppe D'Urso and Momodou Bello N'Jie, did not start.)

Hussein Haleem competed in the men's marathon on 9 August. Haleem completed the marathon in three hours, four minutes and sixteen seconds, finishing 86th out of 87 athletes that finished. (Note: 23 athletes, did not finish and two athletes, Salvador García and Vladimir Mukhanov, did not start.)

Sprinter Aminath Rishtha was the only female sent by the Maldivian delegation to the 1992 games. She was also the first ever female sent by the Maldives to the Olympics. She competed in the women's 100 metres on 31 July and was drawn into heat two. She finished last in her heat and did not advance to the next round. Overall she finished last out of 53 athletes that finished. (Note: One athlete, Magdalena Ansue, was disqualified and another athlete, Antónia de Jesus, did not start.)

Key

- Note–Ranks given for track events are within the athlete's heat only
- Q = Qualified for the next round
- q = Qualified for the next round as a fastest loser or, in field events, by position without achieving the qualifying target
- NR = National record
- N/A = Round not applicable for the event
- Bye = Athlete not required to compete in round

Men

Athlete	Event	Heat		Quarterfinal		Semifinal		Final	
Athlete	Event	Result	Rank	Result	Rank	Result	Rank	Result	Rank
Ahmed Shageef	100 m	11.36	8	did not advance					
Ahmed Shageef	200 m	22.54	7	did not advance					
Mohamed Amir	400 m	50.35	8	did not advance					
Hussain Riyaz	800 m	2:00.93	8	n/a		did not advance			
Hussein Haleem	Marathon	n/a						3:04:16	86

Women

Athlete	Event	Heat		Quarterfinal		Semifinal		Final	
Athlete	Event	Result	Rank	Result	Rank	Result	Rank	Result	Rank
Aminath Rishtha	100 m	13.36	8	did not advance					

== Swimming ==
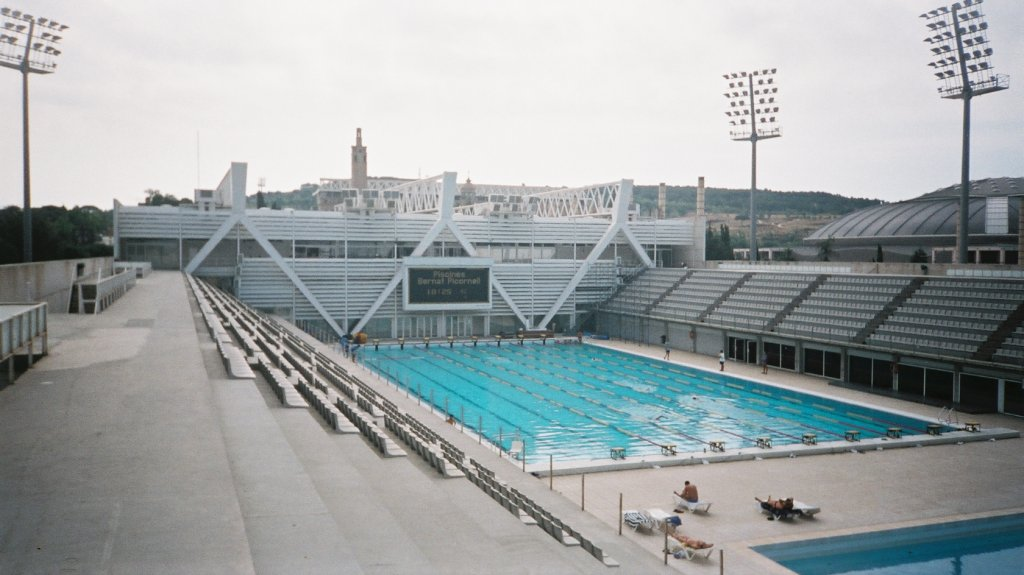
The Piscines Bernat Picornell, where Imthiyaz and Rasheed participated in their events

The Maldives was represented by two male swimmers at the 1992 games. Ahmed Imthiyaz and Mohamed Rasheed, both of whom were making their first appearance at the Olympics. They both competed in the men's 50 metre freestyle and men's 100 metre freestyle. In the 50 metre freestyle, Imthiyaz and Rasheed were drawn in heat one and took the last two spots in their heat. Overall, they took the last two spots from 72 swimmers that finished. (Note: Three athletes, Yves Clausse, José Mossiane and Tsutomu Nakano, were disqualified and one swimmer, Joakim Holmquist, did not start.) In the 100 metre freestyle, they were drawn in the first heat and finished last in the heat. Overall, they took the last two spots out of 75 swimmers that finished. (Note: Two swimmers, Peter Williams and Nayef Al-Hasawi, did not start.)

Men

Athlete	Event	Heat		Final	
Athlete	Event	Time	Rank	Time	Rank
Ahmed Imthiyaz	50 m freestyle	29.27	71	did not advance	
Mohamed Rasheed	50 m freestyle	30.37	72	did not advance	
Ahmed Imthiyaz	100 m freestyle	1:04.96	74	did not advance	
Mohamed Rasheed	100 m freestyle	1:08.12	75	did not advance	

== See also ==
- List of Maldivian records in athletics
- Maldives at the Olympics
