= Maldives at the 2012 Summer Olympics =

- Flag of Maldives
- IOC code: MDV
- NOC: Maldives Olympic Committee
- Website: www.olympic.mv

in London, United Kingdom 27 July 2012 – 12 August 2012
- Competitors: 5 in 3 sports
- Flag bearer (opening): Mohamed Ajfan Rasheed
- Flag bearer (closing): Azneem Ahmed
- Medals: Gold 0 Silver 0 Bronze 0 Total 0

Summer Olympics appearances (overview)
- 1988; 1992; 1996; 2000; 2004; 2008; 2012; 2016; 2020; 2024

The Asian island nation of the Maldives competed at the 2012 Summer Olympics in London from 27 July to 12 August 2012. This was the nation's seventh consecutive appearance at the Olympics, the delegation consisted of two athletes each in track and field (Azneem Ahmed and Afa Ismail) and swimming (Ahmed Husam and Aminath Shajan). For the first time since their debut at the Summer Olympics, the Maldives entered one badminton player into the Olympics. Mohamed Ajfan Rasheed, the inaugural Maldivian badminton player to compete at the Olympics, was the nation's flag bearer at the opening ceremony with Azneem Ahmed carrying the Maldivian flag in the closing ceremony. All the athletes qualified for the games through wild cards from International Association of Athletic Federations FINA and Badminton World Federation. The Maldives however, has yet to win its first ever Olympic medal.

== Background ==
The Maldives is an archipelagic country located in Southern Asia, situated in the Indian Ocean. Formerly a protectorate of the United Kingdom, it gained independence in 1965. The Maldives Olympic Committee was formed in 1985, and was recognized by the International Olympic Committee the same year. The Maldives have participated in every Summer Olympics since its debut in the 1988 Summer Olympics in Seoul. The highest number of Maldivians participating at any single Summer Games was seven at the 1988 Games and the 1992 Games in Barcelona, Spain. No Maldivian has ever won a medal at the Olympics.

The 2012 Summer Olympics were held from 27 July to 12 August 2012. For the 2012 Summer Olympics, the Maldives sent a delegation of five athletes. The Maldivian team at the 2012 Games featured two track and field athletes, a badminton player and two swimmers. The track and field delegation included sprinters Azneem Ahmed and Afa Ismail participating in the men's and women's 100 meters respectively. Mohamed Ajfan Rasheed, participating in the men's singles was the first badminton player that the Maldives had sent to the Olympics. Two swimmers, Ahmed Husam and Aminath Shajan participated in the men's 100 metre freestyle and women's 50 metre freestyle respectively. Ajfaan was chosen to be the flagbearers for the Maldives during the parade of nations of the opening ceremony with Azneem being the flagbearer for the closing ceremony.

== Athletics ==
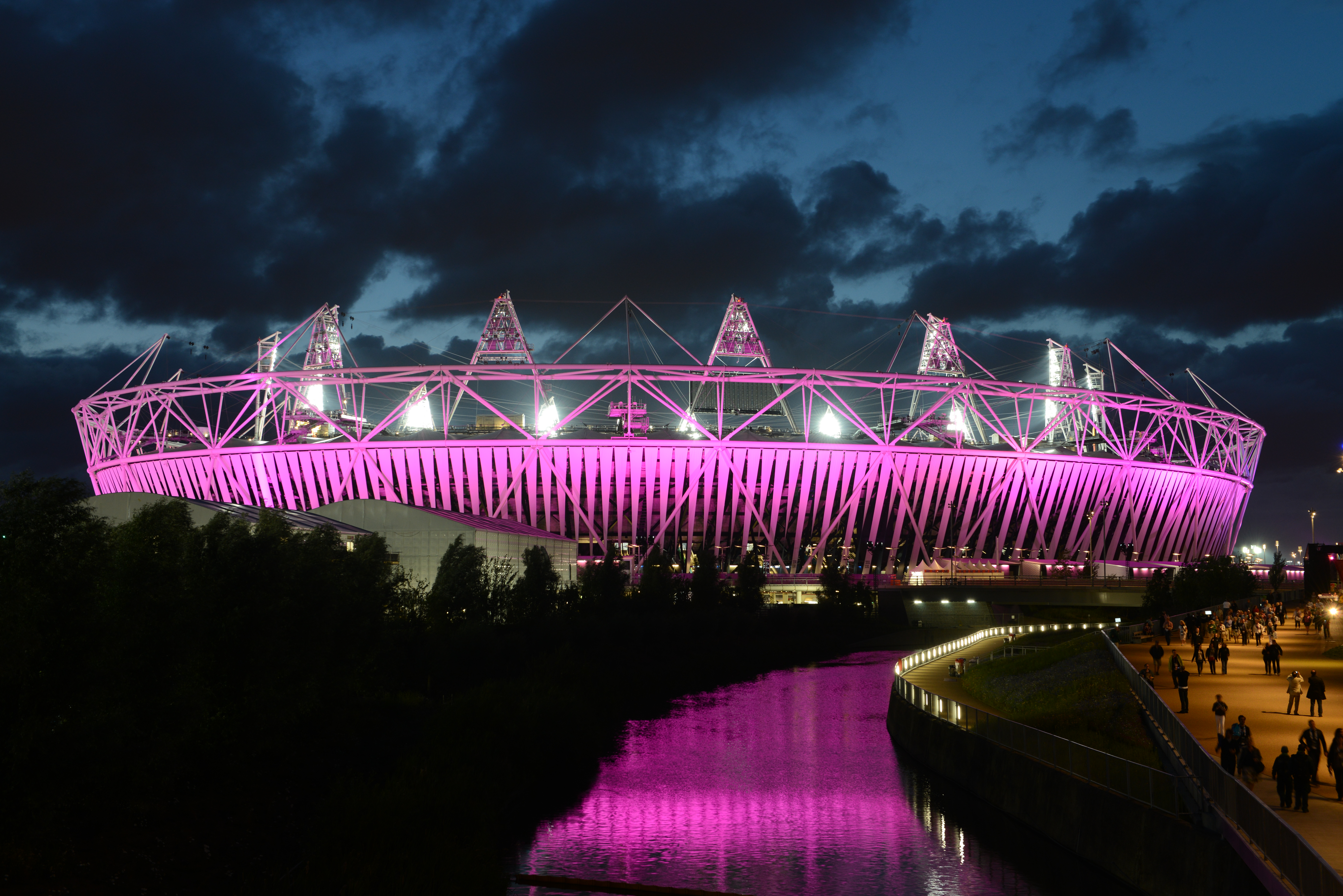
The London Stadium, which served as the track-and-field venue and as the site of their opening and closing ceremonies.

Azneem Ahmed was the sole male athletic competitor and the oldest athlete to compete for the Maldives at the London Games at the age of 23. He had not taken part in any previous Olympic Games. Azneem qualified for the Games via a wildcard because his fastest time of 10.6 seconds was 0.36 seconds slower than the "B" qualifying standard for the men's 100 metres. He competed in the men's 100 metres race on 4 August in the third heat of the preliminaries. Azneem achieved a Maldivian national record finishing third out of eight athletes with a time of 10.79 seconds and advanced to the quarter-finals. Azneem was placed in heat six along with seven other athletes. He posted a time of 10.84 seconds, finishing eighth. He finished 52nd out of 54 athletes overall and did not qualify for the later rounds.

Competing at her first Summer Olympics, Afa Ismail qualified for the London Games as a wildcard, as her best time for the 100 metres event, 12.98 seconds, set in the 2011 Asian Athletics Championships in Kobe, was 1.6 seconds slower than the "B" qualifying standard. She competed in the preliminary round on 3 August and was drawn in the first heat. Afa finished fifth with a time of 12.52 seconds, attaining a personal best but failing to qualify for round 1. Overall she finished 61st out of 78 competitors, (Note: One athlete, Noor Hussain Al Malki, did not finish.) and did not advance into the first round because her fastest time was 0.28 seconds slower than the slowest athlete who progressed.

Key

- Note–Ranks given for track events are within the athlete's heat only
- Q = Qualified for the next round
- q = Qualified for the next round as a fastest loser or, in field events, by position without achieving the qualifying target
- NR = National record
- N/A = Round not applicable for the event
- Bye = Athlete not required to compete in round

Track events

Athlete	Event	Heat		Quarterfinal		Semifinal		Final	
Athlete	Event	Result	Rank	Result	Rank	Result	Rank	Result	Rank
Azneem Ahmed	Men's 100 m	10.79 NR	3 q	10.84	8	did not advance			
Afa Ismail	Women's 100 m	12.52 PB	5	did not advance					

== Badminton ==
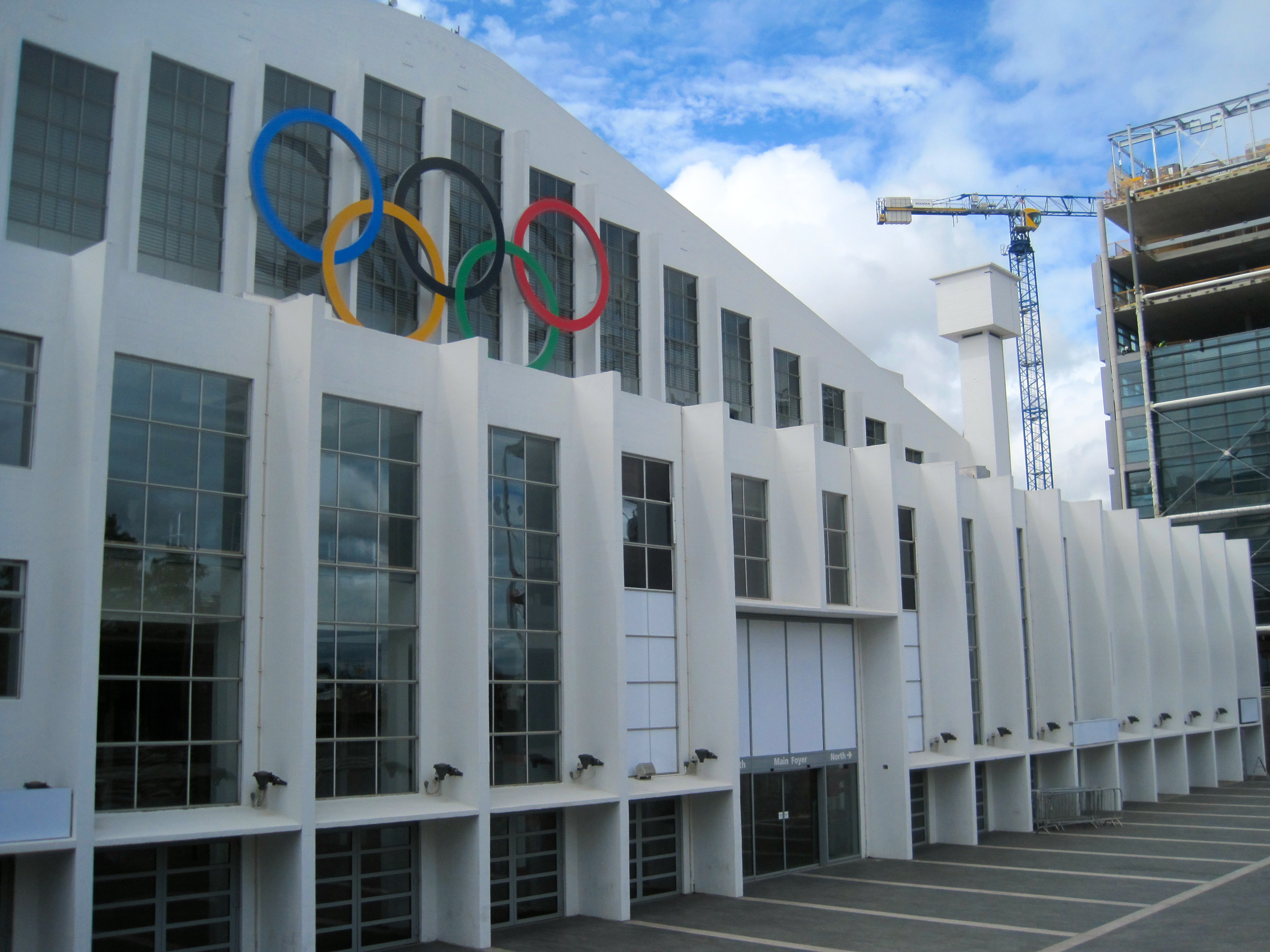
The Wembley Arena where Ajfan competed in the Badminton event.

For the first time since its debut in the 1988 Summer Olympics in Seoul, the Maldives entered a badminton player into the Olympic tournament. Taking part in his first Olympic Games, Mohamed Ajfan Rasheed carried the Maldivian flag at the opening ceremony. He accepted the invitation from the Tripartite Commission and the Badminton World Federation to compete in the men's singles. The Tripartite Commission is made in collaboration of the individual countries' committees, the International Olympic Committee, as well as the Badminton World Federation. Ajfan was drawn in Group K of the men's singles tournament. On 28 July, he played against world fifteenth-ranked Marc Zwiebler of Germany in the group stage, whom he lost against in the first round 9–21 and was defeated by his opponent 6–21 in the second round. Ajfan's next game was against Ukraine's Dmytro Zavadsky two days later whom he lost against in two sets, scoring eight points while his opponent reached 21 points in the first set. He was also defeated in his second set match with a 13-point deficit to Zavadsky and, therefore, he was eliminated from the competition.

Athlete	Event	Group stage			Elimination	Quarterfinal	Semifinal	Final / BM	
Athlete	Event	Opposition Score	Opposition Score	Rank	Opposition Score	Opposition Score	Opposition Score	Opposition Score	Rank
Mohamed Ajfan Rasheed	Men's singles	Zwiebler (GER); L 9–21, 6–21	Zavadsky (UKR); L 8–21, 8–21	3	did not advance				

== Swimming ==
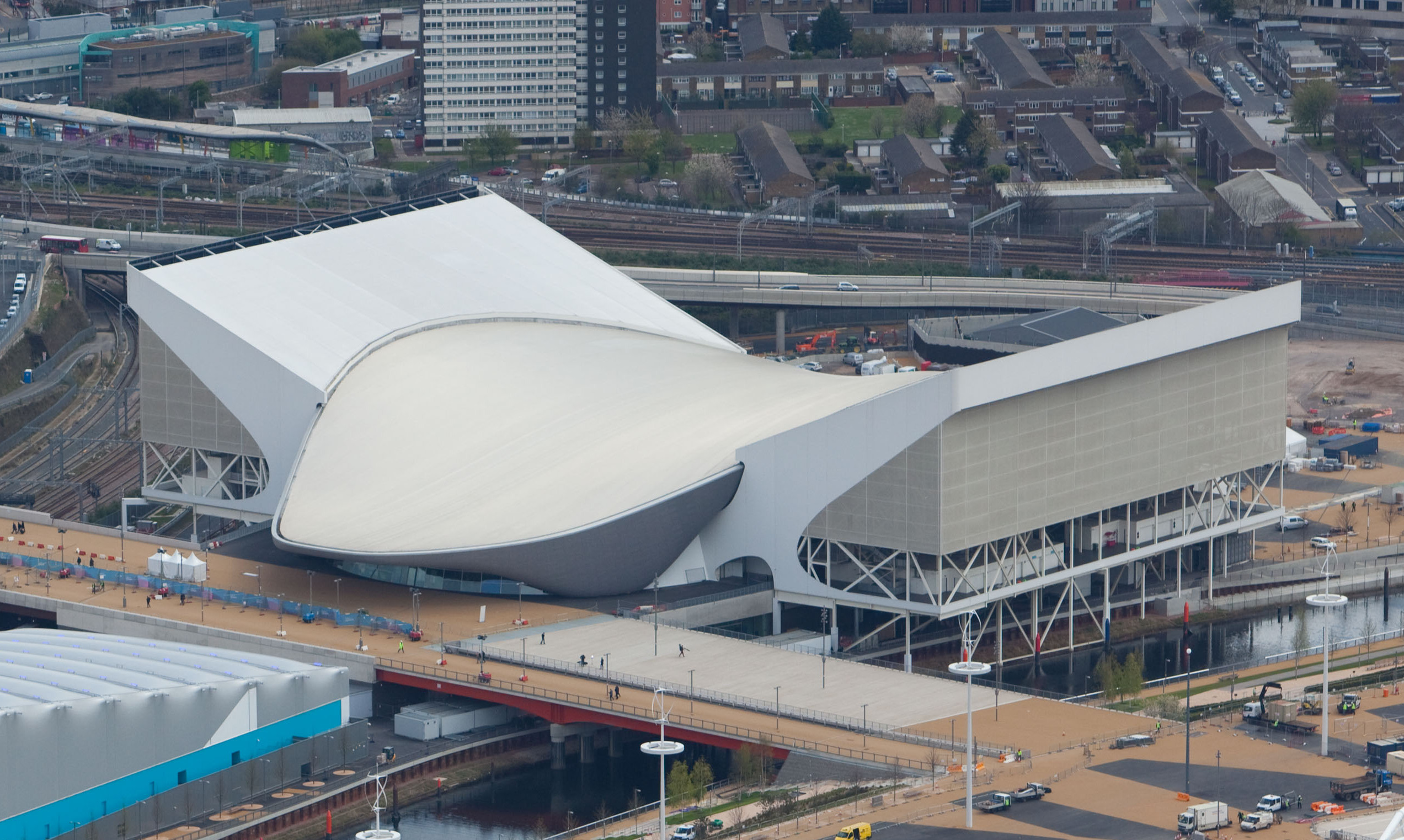
The London Aquatics Centre where Husam and Shajan competed in swimming events.

Competing in the men's 100 metre freestyle at the age of 16, Ahmed Husam was the youngest male athlete to compete on behalf of the Maldives at the London Games. He qualified for the games by using a universality place from the sport's governing body FINA because his fastest time of 59.98 seconds was 3.44 seconds slower than the "B" (FINA/Olympic Invitation Times) qualifying standard for his event. Husam was drawn in the first heat on 31 July, finishing second out of four swimmers, with a time of 57.53 seconds. Overall he finished 53rd out of 56 swimmers, (Note: Four swimmers, Lü Zhiwu, Danila Izotov, George Bovell and Dominik Kozma, did not start.) and was unable to advance to the semi-finals after being 8.54 seconds slower than the slowest competitor who progressed to the later stages.

Maldivian swimmer Aminath Shajan made her Olympic debut at the London Games in the women's 50 metre freestyle. Like Husam she qualified for the Games after FINA awarded her a universality place because her fastest time of 33.43 seconds was not within the "A" or "B" qualifying standard times for the women's 50 metre freestyle. Shajan took part in the event's third heat on 3 August, finishing seventh out of eight swimmers, with a time of 32.23 seconds. She finished 64th out of 73 swimmers, (Note: One swimmer, Eszter Dara, did not start.) and did not qualify for the semi-finals because her time was 7.1 seconds slower than the slowest competitor who progressed to the later stages.

Athlete	Event	Heat		Semifinal		Final	
Athlete	Event	Time	Rank	Time	Rank	Time	Rank
Ahmed Husam	Men's 100 m freestyle	57.53	53	did not advance			
Aminath Shajan	Women's 50 m freestyle	32.23	63	did not advance			

== See also ==
- List of Maldivian records in athletics
- Maldives at the Olympics
