= Maldives at the 1996 Summer Olympics =

- Flag of Maldives
- IOC code: MDV
- NOC: Maldives Olympic Committee
- Website: www.olympic.mv

in Atlanta, United States 19 July 1996 – 4 August 1996
- Competitors: 6 in 2 sports
- Flag bearer: Ahmed Shageef
- Medals: Gold 0 Silver 0 Bronze 0 Total 0

Summer Olympics appearances (overview)
- 1988; 1992; 1996; 2000; 2004; 2008; 2012; 2016; 2020; 2024

The Maldives competed at the 1996 Summer Olympics in Atlanta, United States, from 19 July to 4 August 1996. The delegation's participation in the Atlanta Olympics marked the Maldives' third appearance at the Summer Olympics since their debut at the 1988 Summer Olympics in Seoul, South Korea. Six athletes competed across two sports; Mohamed Amir, Naseer Ismail, Hussain Riyaz, Ahmed Shageef and Yaznee Nasheeda in track and field, and Moosa Nazim in swimming. None of the track or swimming athletes advanced past the first round in their events, and no Maldivian has won a medal in any events. Ahmed Shageef bore the Maldives' flag during the parade of nations of the opening ceremony.

== Background ==
The Maldives is an archipelagic country located in Southern Asia, situated in the Indian Ocean. Formerly a protectorate of the United Kingdom, it gained independence in 1965. The Maldives Olympic Committee was formed in 1985, and was recognized by the International Olympic Committee the same year. The Maldives have participated in every Summer Olympics since its debut in the 1988 Summer Olympics in Seoul. The highest number of Maldivians participating at any single Summer Games was seven at the 1988 Games and the 1992 Games in Barcelona, Spain. No Maldivian has ever won a medal at the Olympics.

The 1996 Summer Olympics were held from 19 July to 4 August 1996. For the 1996 Summer Olympics, the Maldives sent a delegation of six athletes. The Maldivian team at the 1996 Games featured five track and field athletes and one swimmers. Sprinters Mohamed Amir, Naseer Ismail, Hussain Riyaz, Ahmed Shageef and Yaznee Nasheeda were chosen to compete in athletic events. Swimmer Moosa Nazim participated in the men's 50 metre. Sprinter Ahmed Shageef was the flagbearer for the Maldives during the parade of nations of the opening ceremony.

== Athletics ==
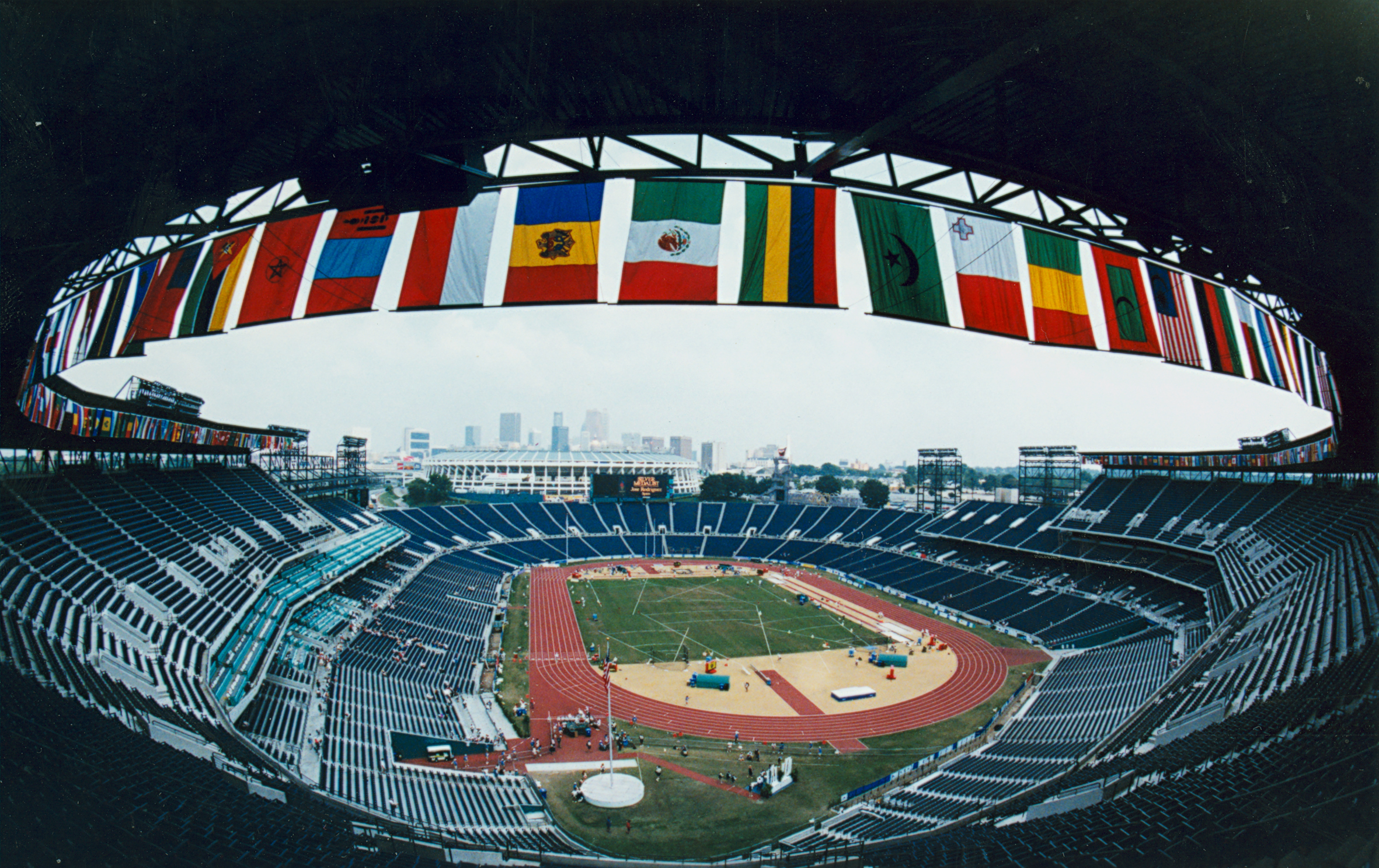
The Centennial Olympic Stadium where the athletic events took place.

The Maldives was represented by five athletes at the 1996 Olympics. Sprinter Mohamed Amir, who was making his second appearance at the Olympics after participating in the 1992 Summer Olympics, took part in the men's 400 metres and the men's 4 × 400 metres relay. He was the oldest athlete in the Maldivian delegation at the age of 26. In the men's 400 metres he was drawn in the fourth heat on 26 July, finishing last out of eight athletes with a time of 49.67 seconds. Lesotho's Mpho Morobe placed ahead of him with a time of 47.54 seconds, in a heat led by Saint Vincent and the Grenadines' Eswort Coombs who posted a time of 45.84 seconds, 3.83 seconds quicker than Amir's time. Out of 64 athletes, Amir ranked 55th out of 58 athletes that finished. (Note: Two athletes, Amar Hecini and Moustafa Abdel Naser, were disqualified. Two athletes, Francis Ogola and Ibrahim Hassan, did not finish. Two athletes, Ibrahim Ouédraogo and Justice Dipeba, did not start.) He was 3.4 seconds behind the slowest athlete that progressed to the quarter-finals. Therefore, he did not progress to the later rounds.

Sprinter Naseer Ismail was making his first appearance at the Olympics competing in the men's 800 metres and the men's 4 × 400 metres relay. He was drawn in heat four on 28 July and competed against seven other athletes. He ran a time of 1 minute and 58.70 seconds, finishing last of the eight athletes competing. Vanuatu's Tavakalo Kailes placed ahead of him with a time of 1 minute and 55.07 seconds. Out of 57 athletes, Saeed ranked 54th out 56 athletes that started. (Note: One athlete, Roberto Parra, did not start.) He was 11.25 seconds behind the slowest athlete that progressed to the quarter-finals. Therefore, he did not progress to the quarter-finals. He would go on to represent the Maldives at the 2000 Summer Olympics.

Like Amir, sprinter Hussain Riyaz was also making his second appearance at the Summer Olympics after participating in the 1992 Games. He took part in the men's 1500 metres and the men's 4 × 400 metres relay. In the men's 500 metres event, he was drawn in the third heat on 29 July. He finished last in his heat with a time of 4 minutes and 15.14 seconds. He finished last out off the 56 athletes that finished. (Note: One athlete, Graham Hood, did not finish.) Therefore, he did not progress to the later rounds.

The men's 4 × 400 metres relay team consisted of Ahmed Shageef, Mohamed Amir, Naseer Ismail, Hussain Riyaz. Ahmed Shageef was the only Maldivian male athlete to not take part in an individual event. This was Shageef's third consecutive appearance at the Summer Olympics since his debut at the 1988 games. They finished the first heat with a time of 3 minutes and 24.88 seconds, garnering sixth and last place in the heat. (Note: The Grenadan team was disqualified.) This was not fast enough to advance to the next round.

Competing at her first ever Summer Olympics, Yaznee Nasheeda was the only female in the Maldivian delegation. She took part in the women's 800 metres event on 26 July and drawn in the third heat. She finished last with a time off 2 minutes and 36.85 seconds. Canada's Charmaine Crooks ranked ahead of her with a time of 2 minutes and 00.27 seconds. Overall, she finished last out off the 33 athletes that competed. (Note: Three athletes, Diane Modahl, Ana Amelia Menéndez and Adama Njie, did not finish and one athlete, Tina Paulino, did not start.)

Key

- Note–Ranks given for track events are within the athlete's heat only
- Q = Qualified for the next round
- q = Qualified for the next round as a fastest loser or, in field events, by position without achieving the qualifying target
- NR = National record
- N/A = Round not applicable for the event
- Bye = Athlete not required to compete in round

Men

Athlete	Event	Heat		Quarterfinal		Semifinal		Final	
Athlete	Event	Result	Rank	Result	Rank	Result	Rank	Result	Rank
Mohamed Amir	400 m	49.67	8	did not advance					
Naseer Ismail	800 m	1:58.70	8	n/a		did not advance			
Hussain Riyaz (Note: also competed in the 1992 Summer Olympics, the 2002 Asian Athletics Championships and the 1998 Commonwealth Games)	1500 m	4:15.14	12	n/a		did not advance			
Ahmed Shageef (Note: flagbearer for the Maldives at the 1996 Summer Olympics; also competed in the 1988 Summer Olympics and the 1992 Olympics, in the 1991 World Championships in Athletics (100 metres and 200 metres) and the 1995 World Championships in Athletics (100 metres)); Mohamed Amir; Naseer Ismail; Hussain Riyaz	4 × 400 m relay	3:24.88	6	n/a		did not advance			

Women

Athlete	Event	Heat		Semifinal		Final	
Athlete	Event	Result	Rank	Result	Rank	Result	Rank
Yaznee Nasheeda	800 m	2:36.85	7	did not advance			

== Swimming ==
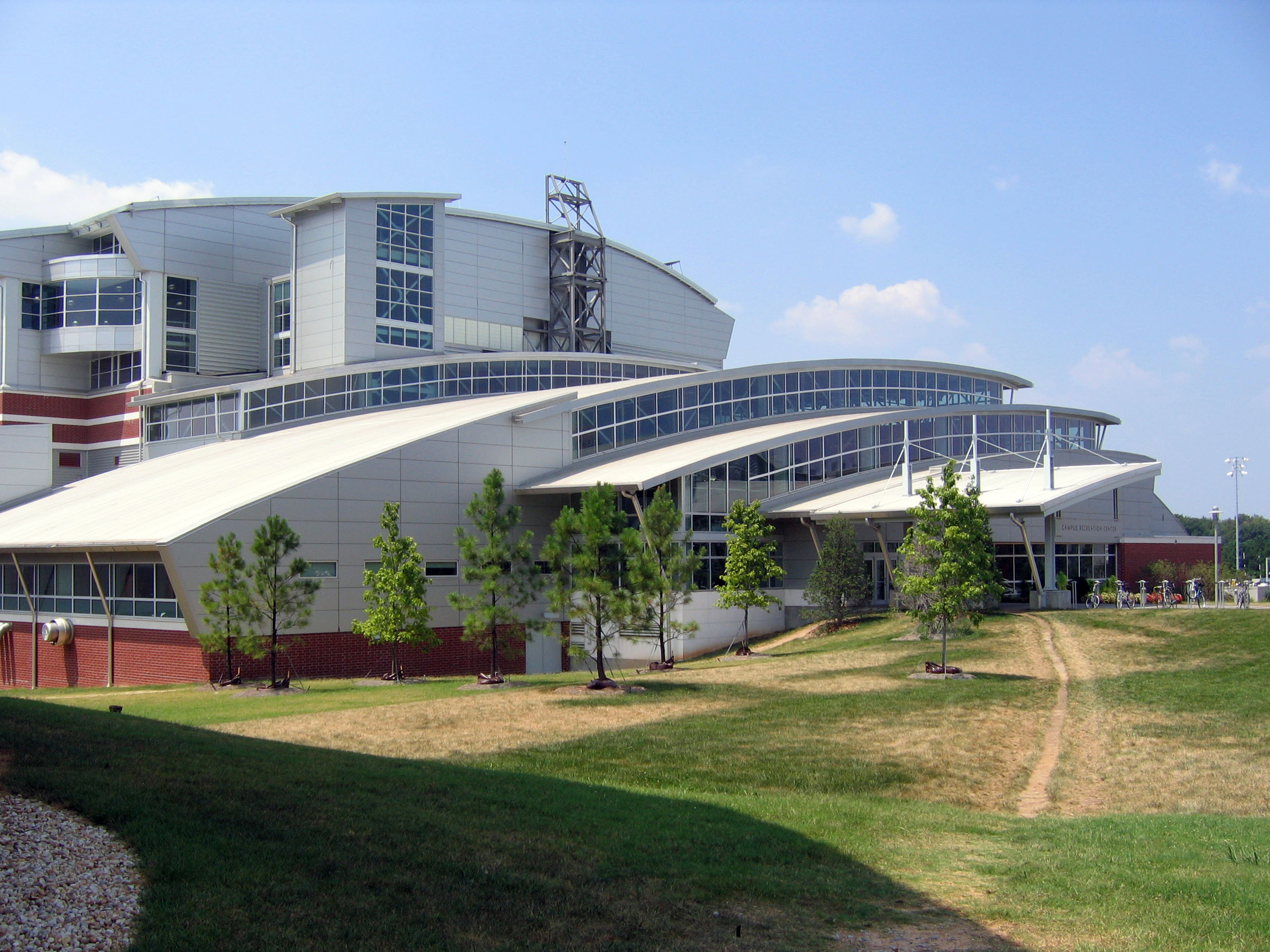
The Georgia Tech Campus Recreation Center, where Nazim participated in his event

Moosa Nazim represented the Maldives as a swimmer in the men's 50 metre freestyle, and was the only Maldivian athlete participating in swimming that year. This marked his first appearance at the Olympics. During the qualification round on 25 July, Nazim competed against two other athletes. He finished the event in 28.37 seconds, ranking second in his heat behind Dominica's Woodrow Lawrence (27.88 seconds), who placed first, and ahead of Democratic Republic of the Congo's René Makosso (30.00 seconds), who placed third. Of the 65 participants in the qualification round, Nazim ranked 61st. (Note: One swimmer, Alexandru Ioanovici, was disqualified and another swimmer, Musa Bakare, did not start.) He did not advance to the later rounds.

Men

Athlete	Event	Heat		Semifinal		Final	
Athlete	Event	Time	Rank	Time	Rank	Time	Rank
Moosa Nazim	50 m freestyle	28.37	61	did not advance			

== See also ==
- List of Maldivian records in athletics
- Maldives at the Olympics
