= Maldives at the 2004 Summer Olympics =

- Flag of Maldives
- IOC code: MDV
- NOC: Maldives Olympic Committee
- Website: www.olympic.mv

in Athens, Greece 13 August 2004 – 29 August 2004
- Competitors: 4 in 2 sports
- Flag bearer: Sultan Saeed
- Medals: Gold 0 Silver 0 Bronze 0 Total 0

Summer Olympics appearances (overview)
- 1988; 1992; 1996; 2000; 2004; 2008; 2012; 2016; 2020; 2024

The Maldives competed at the 2004 Summer Olympics in Athens, Greece, from 13 to 29 August 2004. The delegation's participation in the Athens Olympics marked the Maldives' fifth appearance at the Summer Olympics since their debut at the 1988 Summer Olympics in Seoul, South Korea. Four athletes competed across two sports; Sultan Saeed and Shifana Ali in track and field, and Hassan Mubah and Aminath Rouya Hussain in swimming. None of the track or swimming athletes advanced past the first round in their events, and no Maldivian has won a medal in any events. Sultan Saeed bore the Maldives' flag during the parade of nations of the opening ceremony.

== Background ==
The Maldives is an archipelagic country located in Southern Asia, situated in the Indian Ocean. Formerly a protectorate of the United Kingdom, it gained independence in 1965. The Maldives Olympic Committee was formed in 1985, and was recognized by the International Olympic Committee the same year. The Maldives have participated in every Summer Olympics since its debut in the 1988 Summer Olympics in Seoul. The highest number of Maldivians participating at any single Summer Games was seven at the 1988 Games and the 1992 Games in Barcelona, Spain. No Maldivian has ever won a medal at the Olympics.

The 2004 Summer Olympics were held from 13 to 29 August 2004. For the 2004 Summer Olympics, the Maldives sent a delegation of four athletes. The Maldivian team at the 2004 Games featured two track and field athletes and two swimmers. Sprinters Sultan Saeed and Shifana Ali were chosen to compete in the men's 100 metres and women's 400 metres respectively. Swimmers Hassan Mubah and Aminath Rouya Hussain participated in the men's 50 metre freestyle and women's 50 metre freestyle respectively. Hassan Mubah was the only returning athlete from the 2000 Summer Olympics in Sydney, Australia. Sprinter Sultan Saeed was the flagbearer for the Maldives during the parade of nations of the opening ceremony.

== Athletics ==
Making his Summer Olympics debut, Sultan Saeed carried the Maldivian flag at the opening ceremony. He was the oldest person to represent the nation at the 2004 games at the age of 28. Saeed qualified for the 2004 Athens Games as a wildcard, without competing in any notable sporting event. He competed in the 100 metres on 21 August in Heat 3 against eight other athletes. He ran a time of 11.72 seconds, finishing last of the eight athletes competing. (Note: One athlete, Juan Sainfleur, did not finish.) Comoros's Hadhari Djaffar placed ahead of him with a time of 10.62 seconds, in a heat led by United States's Justin Gatlin who posted a time of 10.07 seconds, 1.65 seconds quicker than Saeed's time. Out of 84 athletes, Saeed ranked last out 80 athletes that started. (Note: Two athletes, Hristoforos Hoidis and Djikoloum Mobele, did not start. One athlete, Juan Sainfleur, did not finish. One athlete, Marc Burns, was disqualified.) He was 1.29 seconds behind the slowest athlete that progressed to the quarter-finals. Therefore, that was the end of his competition.

Competing at her first Summer Olympics, Shifana Ali qualified for the 2004 Athens Games after being granted a wildcard place as she had not competed in any notable sporting event. She competed in the 400 metres on 21 August against 42 other athletes. She finished 40th with a time of 1 minute and 0.92 seconds. China's Bo Fanfang ranked ahead of her with a time of 56.01 seconds. By comparison, the woman who won the gold medal, The Bahamas' Tonique Williams-Darling, posted a time of 49.42 seconds, 11.5 seconds faster than Shifana's time.

Key

- Note–Ranks given for track events are within the athlete's heat only
- Q = Qualified for the next round
- q = Qualified for the next round as a fastest loser or, in field events, by position without achieving the qualifying target
- NR = National record
- N/A = Round not applicable for the event
- Bye = Athlete not required to compete in round

Men

Athlete	Event	Heat		Quarterfinal		Semifinal		Final	
Athlete	Event	Result	Rank	Result	Rank	Result	Rank	Result	Rank
Sultan Saeed	100 m	11.72	8	did not advance					

Women

Athlete	Event	Heat		Semifinal		Final	
Athlete	Event	Result	Rank	Result	Rank	Result	Rank
Shifana Ali	400 m	1:00.92 NR	7	did not advance			

== Swimming ==
The Athens Olympic Aquatic Centre, where Mubah and Rouya participated in their events

Hassan Mubah represented the Maldives as a swimmer in the men's 50 metre freestyle, and was the only male Maldivian athlete participating in swimming that year. This marked his second appearance at the Olympics after participating in the 2000 Summer Olympics. During the qualification round on 19 August, Mubah competed against seven other athletes. He finished the event in 27.71 seconds, ranking seventh in his heat behind Libya's Khaled Ghezzawi (27.55 seconds), who placed sixth, and ahead of Uganda's Edgar Luberenga (27.77 seconds) who placed eight. His heat was led by Mauritian swimmer Chris Hackel (25.33 seconds) and Cameroon's Cole Shade Sule (26.16 seconds). Of the 86 participants in the qualification round, Mubah ranked 73rd. (Note: Three swimmers, Luis Rojas, Peter Mankoč and George Bovell, did not start.) He did not advance to the later rounds.

Aminath Rouya Hussain represented the Maldives at the Athens Olympics as a swimmer participating in the women's 50 meters freestyle. Rouya was 13 years old when she participated in the 50 meters freestyle. During the qualification round of the event, which took place on August 20, Rouya participated in the third heat against seven other athletes. She completed the event in 31.26 seconds, placing last in the event behind Jordan's Samar Nassar (30.83 seconds). Of the 75 athletes, Rouya ranked 65th along with Tracy Ann Route from the Federated States of Micronesia. (Note: Two swimmers, Dominique Diezi and Federica Pellegrini, did not start.) She did not advance to later rounds.

Men

Athlete	Event	Heat		Semifinal		Final	
Athlete	Event	Time	Rank	Time	Rank	Time	Rank
Hassan Mubah	50 m freestyle	27.71	73	did not advance			

Women

Athlete	Event	Heat		Semifinal		Final	
Athlete	Event	Time	Rank	Time	Rank	Time	Rank
Aminath Rouya Hussain	50 m freestyle	31.26	66	did not advance			

== See also ==
- List of Maldivian records in athletics
- Maldives at the Olympics
