= Maldives at the 2016 Summer Olympics =

- Flag of Maldives
- IOC code: MDV
- NOC: Maldives Olympic Committee
- Website: www.olympic.mv

in Rio de Janeiro
- Competitors: 4 in 2 sports
- Flag bearer: Aminath Shajan
- Medals: Gold 0 Silver 0 Bronze 0 Total 0

Summer Olympics appearances (overview)
- 1988; 1992; 1996; 2000; 2004; 2008; 2012; 2016; 2020; 2024; 2028

The Maldives competed at the 2016 Summer Olympics in Rio de Janeiro, Brazil, from 5 to 21 August 2016. This was the nation's eighth consecutive appearance at the Summer Olympics. The delegation included two track and field athletes: Hassan Saaid and Afa Ismail, as well as swimmers Ibrahim Nishwan and Aminath Shajan. Both Shajan and Ismail were returning competitors from the 2012 London Olympics, with the former leading the Maldivian squad as the flag bearer in the opening ceremony. The Maldives, however, has yet to win its first ever Olympic medal.

== Background ==
The Maldives participated in eight Summer Olympics between its debut in the 1988 Summer Olympics in Seoul, South Korea, and the 2016 Summer Olympics in Rio de Janeiro, Brazil. The highest number of Maldivians participating at any single Summer Games was seven at the 1988 Games in Seoul, South Korea and the 1992 Games in Barcelona, Spain. No Maldivian has ever won a medal at the Olympics. All of Maldivian participants competed at the Games through universality slots from the International Association of Athletics Federations and FINA. Shajan was chosen to be The Maldives's flag bearer during the parade of nations of the opening ceremony while Ismail bore the flag during the closing ceremony.

== Athletics ==
The Maldives received universality slots from IAAF to send two athletes (one male and one female) to the Olympics. The sprinters Afa Ismail and Hassan Saaid participated in the Games, with the former in the women's 200 metres and the latter in the men's 100 metres. This marked Saaid's debut in the Olympics, even though he has represented his country at the 2010 and 2014 Commonwealth Games, as well as the 2010 and 2014 Asian Games. The Games were Ismail's second time in the Olympics because of her participation in the 2012 London Olympics. Ismail finished 8th in her heat with a time of 24.96 seconds, attaining a national record but failing to qualify for the semifinals. Saaid achieved a time of 10.43 seconds in his heat, ranking first place and advancing to the quarterfinals. However, Saaid failed to qualify for the semifinals due to coming eighth with a time of 10.47 seconds in the quarterfinals. He could not beat his national record of 10.33 seconds.

Key

- Note–Ranks given for track events are within the athlete's heat only
- Q = Qualified for the next round
- q = Qualified for the next round as a fastest loser or, in field events, by position without achieving the qualifying target
- NR = National record
- N/A = Round not applicable for the event
- Bye = Athlete not required to compete in round

Track events

Athlete	Event	Heat		Quarterfinal		Semifinal		Final	
Athlete	Event	Time	Rank	Time	Rank	Time	Rank	Time	Rank
Hassan Saaid	Men's 100 m	10.43	1 Q	10.47	8	did not advance			
Afa Ismail	Women's 200 m	24.96 NR	8	—N/a		did not advance			

== Swimming ==
The Maldives received a universality invitation from FINA to send two swimmers (one male and one female) to the Olympics. Competitor Ibrahim Nishwan made his debut while Aminath Shajan made her second appearance, with the first being in the women's 50 metre freestyle event of the London Olympics, in which she did not qualify for the semifinals. Nishwan participated in the men's 200 metre individual medley event of the 2014 Asian Games, but was disqualified following an illegal turn. Shajan has previously won bronze at the women's 800m freestyle event of the 2016 South Asian Games with a time of 10:41.41. The duo did not train in the conditions other athletes did. In an interview, Shajan said they "train in the sea" and that "sometimes jellyfish bite [them]." Nishwan started in the fourth lane. He came third in his heat and ranked 71st total, being 55 positions shy of qualification with a time of 26.72 seconds. Shajan started in the first lane and finished last (excluding Federica Pellegrini and Michelle Coleman who did not start) with a time of 1:05.71 minutes.

Athlete	Event	Heat		Semifinal		Final	
Athlete	Event	Time	Rank	Time	Rank	Time	Rank
Ibrahim Nishwan	Men's 50 m freestyle	26.72	71	Did not advance			
Aminath Shajan	Women's 100 m freestyle	1:05.71	46	Did not advance			
