= Maldives at the 1988 Summer Olympics =

- Flag of Maldives
- IOC code: MDV
- NOC: Maldives Olympic Committee

in Seoul 17 September 1988 – 2 October 1988
- Competitors: 7 in 1 sport
- Flag bearer: Hussein Haleem
- Medals: Gold 0 Silver 0 Bronze 0 Total 0

Summer Olympics appearances (overview)
- 1988; 1992; 1996; 2000; 2004; 2008; 2012; 2016; 2020; 2024

The Maldives competed at the 1988 Summer Olympics in Seoul, South Korea, from 17 September to 2 October 1988. This marked their first time participating in the Olympic Games. Seven athletes competed in athletic events; Ismail Asif Waheed, Ahmed Shageef, Abdul Haji Abdul Latheef, Hussein Haleem Ibrahim Manik, Abdul Razzak Aboobakur and Mohamed Hanim in track and field. None of the athletes advanced past the first round in their events, and no Maldivian has won a medal at the Olympics. Hussein Haleem bore the Maldives' flag during the parade of nations of the opening ceremony.

== Background ==
The Maldives is an archipelagic country located in Southern Asia, situated in the Indian Ocean. Formerly a protectorate of the United Kingdom, it gained independence in 1965. The Maldives Olympic Committee was formed in 1985, and was recognized by the International Olympic Committee the same year. The Maldives have participated in every Summer Olympics since its debut in the 1988 Summer Olympics in Seoul. The highest number of Maldivians participating at any single Summer Games was seven at the 1988 Games and the 1992 Games in Barcelona, Spain. No Maldivian has ever won a medal at the Olympics.

The 1988 Summer Olympics were held from 17 September to 2 October 1988. For the 1988 Summer Olympics, the Maldives sent a delegation of seven athletes. The Maldivian team at the 1988 Games featured seven track and field athletes. Sprinters Ismail Asif Waheed, Ahmed Shageef, Abdul Haji Abdul Latheef, Hussein Haleem Ibrahim Manik, Abdul Razzak Aboobakur and Mohamed Hanim competed in athletic events. Sprinter Hussein Haleem was the flagbearer for the Maldives during the parade of nations of the opening ceremony.

== Athletics ==
The Maldives debut delegation at the Olympics consisted of 7 males all participating in athletics events: Ismail Asif Waheed, Ahmed Shageef, Abdul Haji Abdul Latheef, Hussein Haleem, Ibrahim Manik, Abdul Razzak Aboobakur and Mohamed Hanim. Hussain Haleem and Ahmed Shageef would go on to represent the Maldives at the 1992 games in Barcelona with the later athlete also going on to represent the Maldives at the 1996 games in Atlanta.

Ismail Asif Waheed was the only Maldivian athlete to participate in two different individual events (men's 100 metres and men's 200 metres) and also the only Maldivian athlete to participate in both individual and group events. In the men's 100 metres event, Asif was drawn in heat 12 and competed against seven other athletes. He ran a time of 11.49 seconds, finishing last of the eight athletes competing. Out of 57 athletes, Saeed ranked 54th out 56 athletes that started. He was 11.25 seconds behind the slowest athlete that progressed to the quarter-finals. In the men's 200 metres event he finished last out of 8 athletes in his heat. Overall, he ranked last out of 71 athletes that finished. (Note: Three athletes, Samuel Birch, Simeon Kipkemboi and Boevi Lawson, did not start and one athlete, Arménio Fernandes, was disqualified.)

Ahmed Shageef competed in the men's 400 metres on 24 September. He was drawn in heat four and finished last out of the eight athletes in his heat with a time of 50.61 seconds, failing to advance to the next round. Overall, he finished 67th out of 73 athletes that finished. (Note: Four athletes, Luis Neto, William Taramai, Derek Redmond and Porfirio Méndez, did not start.) The medals in the event went to athletes from the United States.

Sprinters Abdul Haji Abdul Latheef and Hussein Haleem competed in the men's marathon on 2 October. Both athletes failed to finish the race. The men's 4 × 100 metres relay team consisted of Ismail Asif Waheed, Ibrahim Manik, Abdul Razzak Aboobakur and Mohamed Hanim. Ismail Asif Waheed was the only Maldivian athlete to take part in both an individual event and a group event. They finished the first heat with a time of 44.31 seconds, garnering seventh and last place in the heat. This was not fast enough to advance to the next round.

Athlete	Events	Heat		Semifinal		Final	
Athlete	Events	Result	Rank	Result	Rank	Result	Rank
Ismail Asif Waheed	100 m	11.49	95	Did not advance			
Ismail Asif Waheed	200 m	23.17	71	Did not advance			
Ahmed Shageef	400 m	50.61	67	Did not advance			
Abdul Haji Abdul Latheef	Marathon	n/a				DNF	
Hussein Haleem	Marathon	n/a				DNF	
Ismail Asif Waheed; Ibrahim Manik; Abdul Razzak Aboobakur; Mohamed Hanim	4 × 100 m Relay	44.31	26	Did not advance			

== See also ==
- List of Maldivian records in athletics
- Maldives at the Olympics
