= Maldives at the 2024 Summer Olympics =

- Flag of the Maldives
- IOC code: MDV
- NOC: Maldives Olympic Committee
- Website: www.olympic.mv

in Paris, France 26 July 2024 – 11 August 2024
- Competitors: 5 (2 men and 3 women) in 4 sports
- Flag bearers: Ibadulla Adam & Fathimath Dheema Ali
- Medals: Gold 0 Silver 0 Bronze 0 Total 0

Summer Olympics appearances (overview)
- 1988; 1992; 1996; 2000; 2004; 2008; 2012; 2016; 2020; 2024

The Maldives competed at the 2024 Summer Olympics in Paris, France, from 26 July to 11 August 2024. It was the nation's tenth appearance at the Summer Olympics, since the official debut at the 1988 Summer Olympics.

== Competitors ==
The following is the list of number of competitors in the Games.

| Sport | Men | Women | Total |
|---|---|---|---|
| Athletics | 1 | 0 | 1 |
| Badminton | 0 | 1 | 1 |
| Swimming | 1 | 1 | 2 |
| Table tennis | 0 | 1 | 1 |
| Total | 2 | 3 | 5 |

== Athletics ==
Maldives sent one sprinter to compete at the 2024 Summer Olympics.

Key

- Note–Ranks given for track events are within the athlete's heat only
- Q = Qualified for the next round
- q = Qualified for the next round as a fastest loser or, in field events, by position without achieving the qualifying target
- NR = National record
- N/A = Round not applicable for the event
- Bye = Athlete not required to compete in round

Track events

| Athlete | Event | Preliminary | | Heat | | Semifinal | | Final | |
| Athlete | Event | Result | Rank | Result | Rank | Result | Rank | Result | Rank |
|---|---|---|---|---|---|---|---|---|---|
| Ibadulla Adam | Men's 100 m | 10.55 PB | 5 | Did not advance | | | | | |

== Badminton ==
Maldives entered one badminton players into the Olympic tournament. Tokyo 2020 Olympian, Fathimath Nabaaha Abdul Razzaq secured her spots after receiving the allocations of universality spots.

| Athlete | Event | Group stage | | | Elimination | Quarter-final | Semi-final | Final / BM | |
| Athlete | Event | Opposition Score | Opposition Score | Rank | Opposition Score | Opposition Score | Opposition Score | Opposition Score | Rank |
|---|---|---|---|---|---|---|---|---|---|
| Fathimath Nabaaha Abdul Razzaq | Women's singles | Sindhu (IND); L (9–21, 6–21) | Kuuba (EST); L (7–21, 9–21) | 3 | Did not advance | | | | |

== Swimming ==
Maldives sent two swimmers to compete at the 2024 Paris Olympics, through the allocation of universality places.

| Athlete | Event | Heat | | Semifinal | | Final | |
| Athlete | Event | Time | Rank | Time | Rank | Time | Rank |
|---|---|---|---|---|---|---|---|
| Mohamed Aan Hussain | Men's 50 m freestyle | 24.22 | 50 | Did not advance | | | |
| Aishath Ulya Shaig | Women's 50 m freestyle | 29.39 | 56 | Did not advance | | | |

Qualifiers for the latter rounds (Q) of all events were decided on a time only basis, therefore positions shown are overall results versus competitors in all heats.

== Table tennis ==
For the first time, Maldives entered one table tennis player into Paris 2024. Fathimath Dheema Ali qualified for the games following the triumph of winning the gold medal in the women's single event, at the 2024 South Asian Qualification Tournament in Kathmandu, Nepal; signifying the nations debut at these sports.

| Athlete | Event | Preliminary | Round 1 | Round 2 | Round of 16 | Quarterfinals | Semifinals | Final / BM | |
| Athlete | Event | Opposition Result | Opposition Result | Opposition Result | Opposition Result | Opposition Result | Opposition Result | Opposition Result | Rank |
|---|---|---|---|---|---|---|---|---|---|
| Fathimath Dheema Ali | Women's singles | Wegrzyn (POL); L 0–4 | Did not advance | | | | | | |
