= Maldives at the 2000 Summer Olympics =

- Flag of Maldives
- IOC code: MDV
- NOC: Maldives Olympic Committee
- Website: www.olympic.mv

in Sydney, Australia 15 September 2000 – 1 October 2000
- Competitors: 4 in 2 sports
- Flag bearer: Naseer Ismail
- Medals: Gold 0 Silver 0 Bronze 0 Total 0

Summer Olympics appearances (overview)
- 1988; 1992; 1996; 2000; 2004; 2008; 2012; 2016; 2020; 2024

The Maldives competed at the 2000 Summer Olympics in Sydney, Australia, from 15 September to 1 October 2000. The delegation's participation in the Sydney Olympics marked the Maldives' fourth appearance at the Summer Olympics since their debut at the 1988 Summer Olympics in Seoul, South Korea. Four athletes competed across two sports; Naseer Ismail and Shamha Ahmed in track and field, and Hassan Mubah and Fariha Fathimath in swimming. Neither advanced past the first round in their respective events, and no Maldivian has won a medal in any events. Naseer Ismail bore the Maldives' flag during the parade of nations of the opening ceremony.

== Background ==
The Maldives is an archipelagic country located in Southern Asia, situated in the Indian Ocean. Formerly a protectorate of the United Kingdom, it gained independence in 1965. The Maldives Olympic Committee was formed in 1985, and was recognized by the International Olympic Committee the same year. The Maldives have participated in every Summer Olympics since its debut in the 1988 Summer Olympics in Seoul. The highest number of Maldivians participating at any single Summer Games was seven at the 1988 Games and the 1992 Games in Barcelona, Spain. No Maldivian has ever won a medal at the Olympics.

The 2000 Summer Olympics were held from 15 September to 1 October 2000. For the 2000 Summer Olympics, the Maldives sent a delegation of four athletes. The Maldivian team at the 2000 Games featured two track and field athletes and two swimmers. Sprinters Naseer Ismail and Shamha Ahmed were chosen to compete in the men's 800 metres and women's 100 metres respectively. Swimmers Hassan Mubah and Fariha Fathimath participated in the men's 50 metre freestyle and women's 50 metre freestyle respectively. Naseer Ismail was the only returning athlete from the 1996 Summer Olympics in Atlanta, United States. He was also the flagbearer for the Maldives during the parade of nations of the opening ceremony.

== Athletics ==
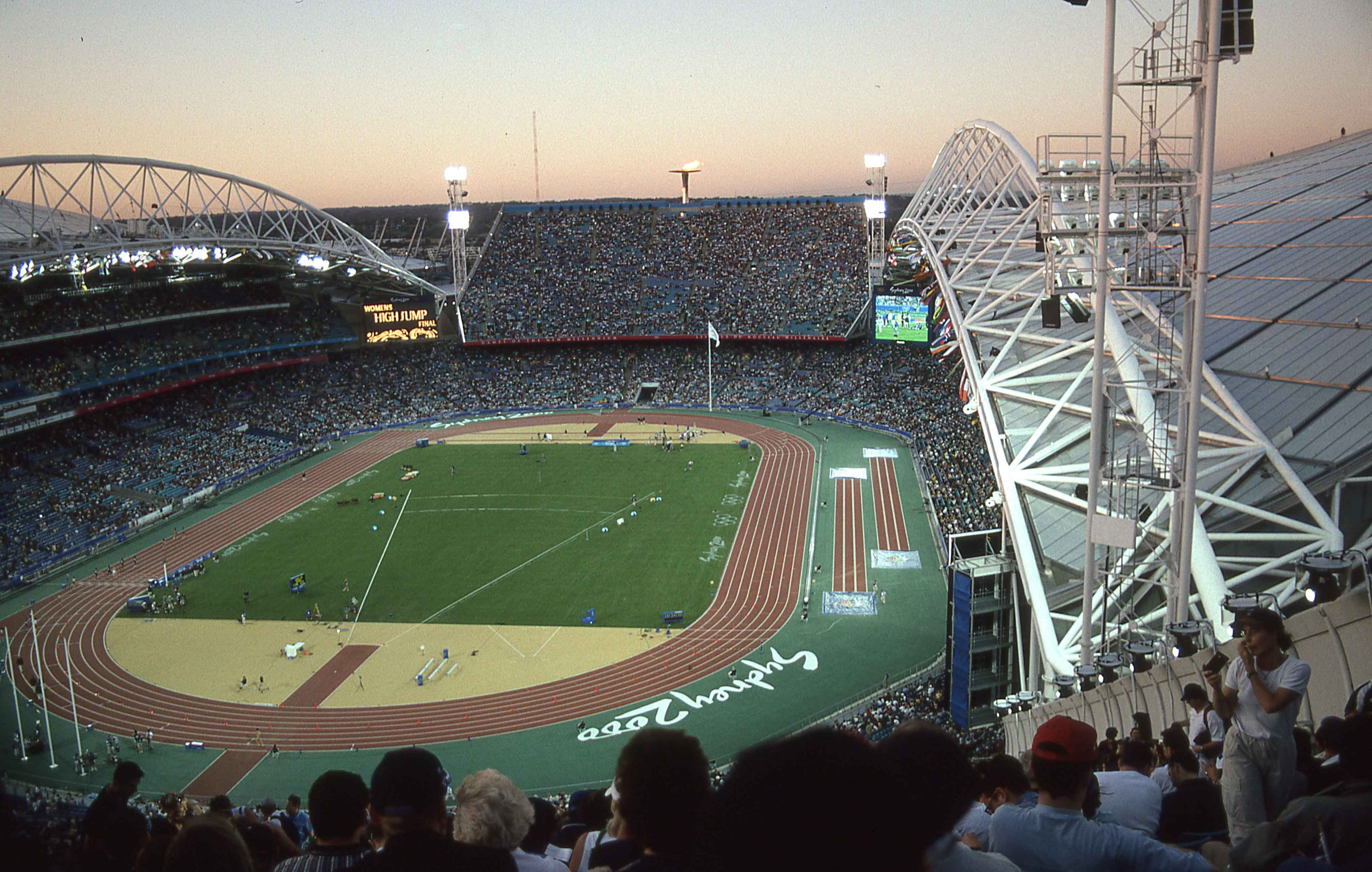
Stadium Australia where both Naseer and Shamha competed in athletics

Naseer Ismail was 26 years old at the time of the Sydney Olympics, and was making his second Olympic appearance, having previously represented the Maldives at the 1996 Summer Olympics. On 23 September, he participated in the first round of the men's 800 meters race, and was drawn into heat five. He finished the race in 1 minute and 56.67 seconds, seventh out of eight competitors in his heat, and was eliminated. The gold medal was eventually won in 1 minute and 45.08 seconds by Nils Schumann of Germany; the silver was won by Wilson Kipketer of Denmark, and the bronze was earned by Djabir Saïd-Guerni of Algeria.

Shamha Ahmed was 18 years old at the time of the Sydney Olympics, and was making her only Olympic appearance. On 22 September, she took part in the first round of the women's 100 metres, and was drawn into heat six. She finished the race in 12.87 seconds, ninth and last in her heat. In the event overall, the gold medal is vacant due to original gold medalist Marion Jones of the United States admitting to steroid use and forfeiting her medals and results from the Sydney Games. Officially, the medals in the event are held by Ekaterini Thanou of Greece and Tayna Lawrence (the original bronze medalist) of Jamaica sharing silver, and Merlene Ottey, also of Jamaica, the original fourth-place finisher, being awarded a bronze. Gold was left vacant because Thanou, the original silver medalist, had failed a drug test at the 2004 Summer Olympics.

Key

- Note–Ranks given for track events are within the athlete's heat only
- Q = Qualified for the next round
- q = Qualified for the next round as a fastest loser or, in field events, by position without achieving the qualifying target
- NR = National record
- N/A = Round not applicable for the event
- Bye = Athlete not required to compete in round

Men

Athlete	Event	Heat		Semifinal		Final	
Athlete	Event	Result	Rank	Result	Rank	Result	Rank
Naseer Ismail	800 m	1:56.67	7	did not advance			

Women

Athlete	Event	Heat		Semifinal		Final	
Athlete	Event	Result	Rank	Result	Rank	Result	Rank
Shamha Ahmed	100 m	12.87	9	did not advance			

== Swimming ==
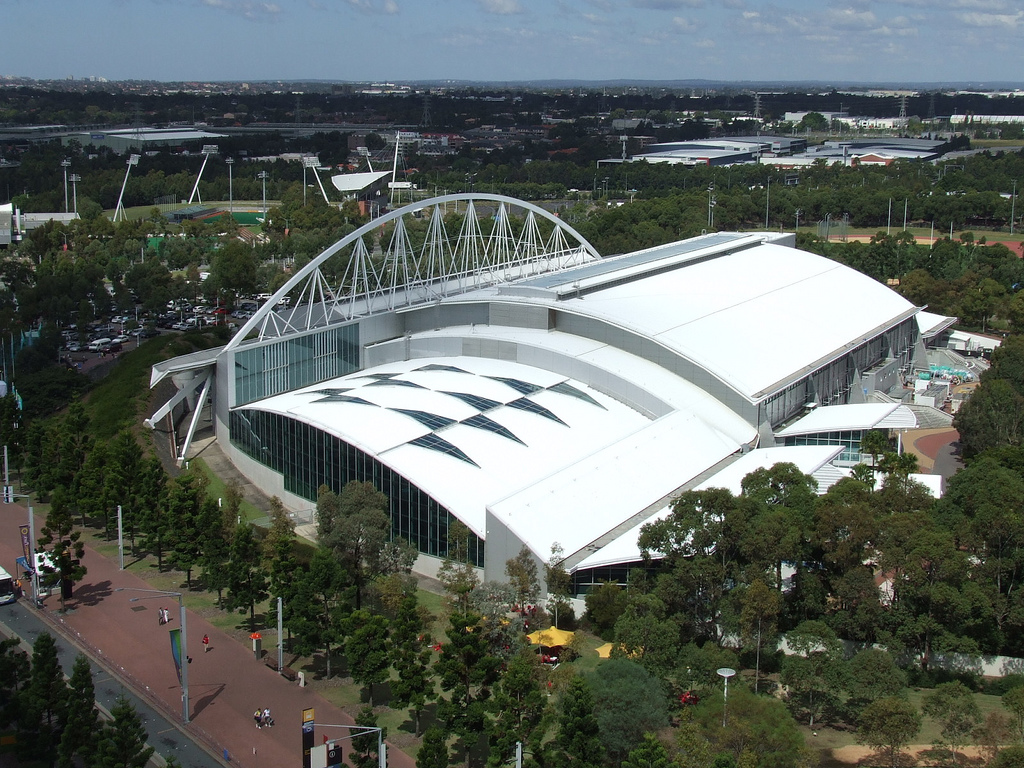
The Sydney Olympic Park Aquatic Centre where Mubah and Fariha competed in swimming events.

Competing in his first Summer Olympics, 16-year old Hassan Mubah was the youngest man to compete on behalf of the Maldives at the Sydney Games. In the first round of Mubah's contest, he was drawn to swim in the first heat on 21 September. He completed the race in a time of 28.86 seconds, which put him in fifth out of the seven swimmers in his heat. Mubah placed 73rd out of 75 finishing athletes overall and this meant he did not progress to the semifinals since only the top 16 were permitted to advance to that stage. (Note: Two swimmers, Mohamed Abdul Hamid and Craig Hutchison, were disqualified.)

Fariha Fathimath was the youngest athlete from the Maldivian delegation of any event to compete at the 2000 Sydney Summer Olympics at the age of 13. Fariha represented the Maldives at the Sydney Olympics as a swimmer participating in the women's 50 meters freestyle. During the qualification round of the event, which took place on 22 September, she participated in the second heat against six other athletes. She completed the event in 32.36 seconds, placing fifth in the event behind Saint Vincent and the Grenadines' Teran Matthews (31.71 seconds). Of the 73 athletes, Fariha ranked 69th. She did not advance to later rounds. (Note: One swimmer, Fatema Hameed Gerashi, was disqualified.)

Men

Athlete	Event	Heat		Semifinal		Final	
Athlete	Event	Time	Rank	Time	Rank	Time	Rank
Hassan Mubah	50 m freestyle	28.86	73	did not advance			

Women

Athlete	Event	Heat		Semifinal		Final	
Athlete	Event	Time	Rank	Time	Rank	Time	Rank
Fariha Fathimath	50 m freestyle	32.36	69	did not advance			

== See also ==
- List of Maldivian records in athletics
- Maldives at the Olympics
