= Maldives at the 2020 Summer Olympics =

- Flag of Maldives
- IOC code: MDV
- NOC: Maldives Olympic Committee
- Website: www.olympic.mv

in Tokyo, Japan July 23, 2021 – August 8, 2021
- Competitors: 4 in 3 sports
- Flag bearers (opening): Fathimath Nabaaha Abdul Razzaq; Mubal Azzam Ibrahim
- Flag bearer (closing): N/A
- Medals: Gold 0 Silver 0 Bronze 0 Total 0

Summer Olympics appearances (overview)
- 1988; 1992; 1996; 2000; 2004; 2008; 2012; 2016; 2020; 2024

The Maldives competed at the 2020 Summer Olympics in Tokyo which were held from 23 July to 8 August 2021. Originally scheduled to take place from 24 July to 9 August 2020, the event was postponed due to the COVID-19 pandemic. This was the nation's ninth appearance at the Summer Olympics since its debut in 1988. The delegation consisted of four athletes, two men and two women, competing in four events across three sports. Two athletes participated in the swimming tournament: Mubal Azzam Ibrahim and Aishath Sajina. Athlete Hassan Saaid, a returning competitor from the 2016 Rio Olympics competed in the men's 100 m. Fathimath Nabaaha Abdul Razzaq was the first badminton player the Maldives entered into the Olympic tournament since the 2012 London Olympics. For the first time, in an effort to promote gender equality, two flagbearers, one male and one female were allowed at the Olympics. Nabaaha and Mubal lead the Maldivian squad as the flagbearers in the opening ceremony. The Maldives, however, has yet to win its first ever Olympic medal.

== Background ==
The Maldives is an archipelagic country located in Southern Asia, situated in the Indian Ocean. Formerly a protectorate of the United Kingdom, it gained independence in 1965. The Maldives Olympic Committee was formed in 1985, and was recognized by the International Olympic Committee the same year. The Maldives have participated in every Summer Olympics since its debut in the 1988 Summer Olympics in Seoul. The highest number of Maldivians participating at any single Summer Games was seven at the 1988 Games and the 1992 Games in Barcelona, Spain. No Maldivian has ever won a medal at the Olympics.

The 2020 Summer Olympics were originally due to be held from 24 July to 9 August 2020, but were delayed to 23 July to 8 August 2021 due to the COVID-19 pandemic. For the 2020 Summer Olympics, the Maldives sent a delegation of four athletes. The Maldivian team at the 2020 Games featured a track and field athlete, a badminton player and two swimmers. Sprinter Hassan Saaid participating in the men's 100 metres was the only returning athlete from the 2016 Summer Olympics in Rio de Janeiro, Brazil. Badminton player Fathimath Nabaaha Abdul Razzaq and swimmers Mubal Azzam Ibrahim and Aishath Sajina made their debut at the Olympics participating in the women's singles, men's 100 m freestyle and women's 100 m breaststroke respectively. All of the Maldivian participants qualified for the Games through universality slots (a quota allowing nations to send athletes if no one has qualified for the event) from the International Association of Athletics Federations, FINA and Badminton World Federation. Nabaaha and Mubal were chosen to be the flagbearers for the Maldives during the parade of nations of the opening ceremony. No athletes were present for the closing ceremony.

== Athletics ==
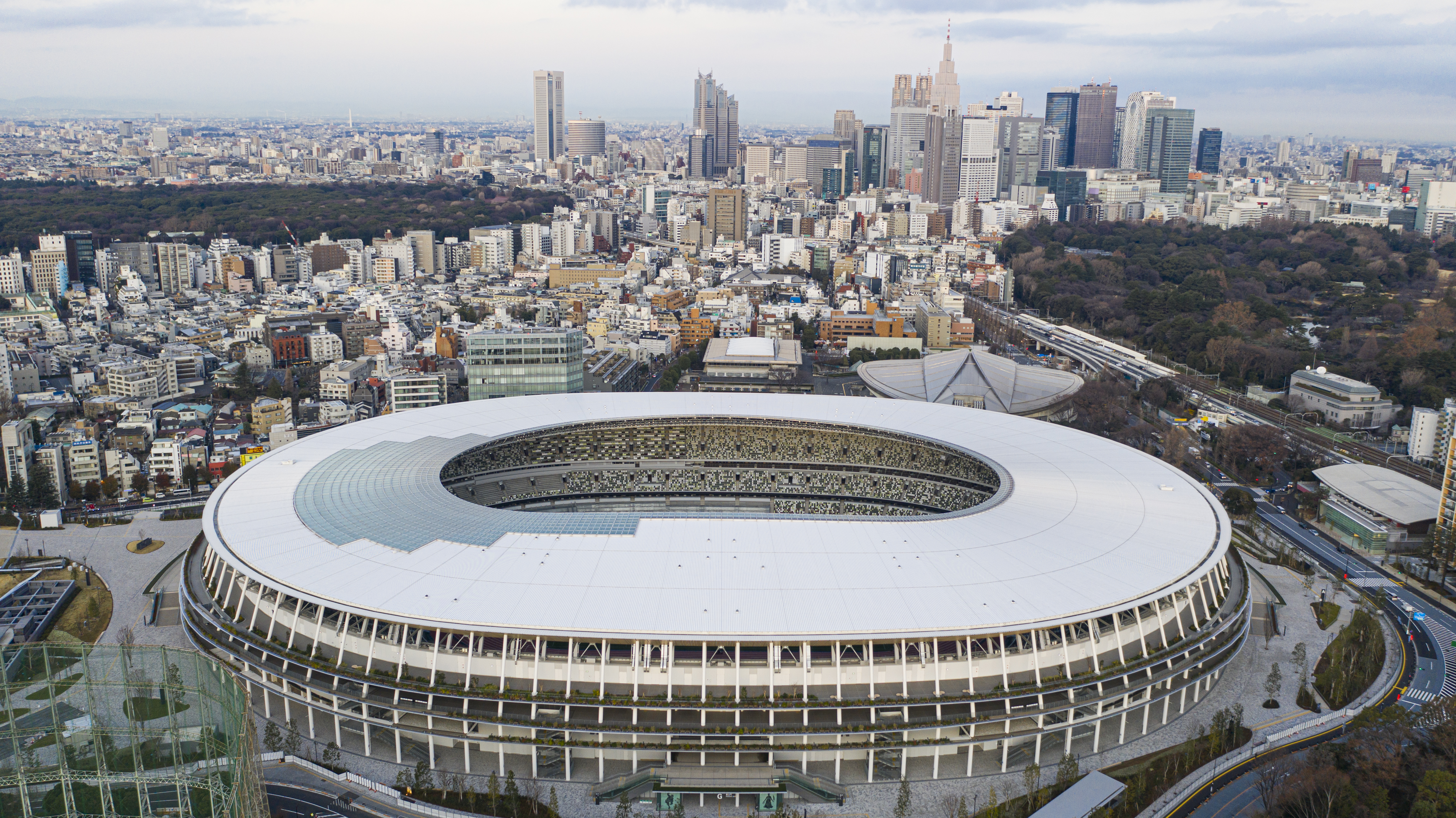
The Japan National Stadium, where the track and field events took place.

Maldives received universality slots from the International Association of Athletics Federations to send two athletes in athletics, one male and one female, to the Olympics. In March 2021, the Athletics Association of Maldives shortlisted six Maldivian sprinters, three males and three females to participate in the games. The athletes included Hassan Saaid, Ahmed Najdan Abdulla, Ibadulla Adam, Aishath Himna Hassan, Aishath Shabaa Saleem and Mariyam Ru'ya Ali. After time trials held in June 2021, Saaid was chosen as the athlete that would represent the Maldives at the Olympics. The Games were Saaid's second time in the Olympics because of his participation in the 2016 Rio Olympics. Saaid finished fourth in the preliminary round with a time of 10.70 seconds, attaining a season best but failing to qualify for round 1.

Key

- Note–Ranks given for track events are within the athlete's heat only
- Q = Qualified for the next round
- q = Qualified for the next round as a fastest loser or, in field events, by position without achieving the qualifying target
- NR = National record
- N/A = Round not applicable for the event
- Bye = Athlete not required to compete in round

Track & road events

Athlete	Event	Heat		Quarterfinal		Semifinal		Final	
Athlete	Event	Result	Rank	Result	Rank	Result	Rank	Result	Rank
Hassan Saaid	Men's 100 m	10.70 SB	4	Did not advance					

== Badminton ==
For the first time since London 2012, the Maldives entered a badminton player into the Olympic tournament. Fathimath Nabaaha Abdul Razzaq accepted the invitation from the Tripartite Commission and the Badminton World Federation to compete in the women's singles. The Tripartite Commission is made in collaboration of the individual countries' committees, the International Olympic Committee, as well as the Badminton World Federation.

Nabaaha is the first ever female badminton player to represent the Maldives at the Olympic Games. She participated in the women's singles event. Nabaaha was seeded in group G together with He Bingjiao of China and Sorayya Aghaei of Iran. Nabaaha lost both her sets against He Bingjiao on 25 July, the first 21–6 and the second 21–3. The following day, Nabaaha also lost both sets against Sorayya Aghaei. The first was 21–14 and the second 21–7. She finished in the bottom of her group, and was eliminated from the tournament. He Bingjiao went on to beat Sorayya Aghaei in two sets on 28 July, qualifying her for the next round, the first 21–11 and the second 21–3.

Athlete	Event	Group stage			Elimination	Quarterfinal	Semifinal	Final / BM	
Athlete	Event	Opposition Score	Opposition Score	Rank	Opposition Score	Opposition Score	Opposition Score	Opposition Score	Rank
Fathimath Nabaaha Abdul Razzaq	Women's singles	He Bj (CHN); L (6–21, 3–21)	Aghaei (IRI); L (14–21, 7–21)	3	Did not advance				

== Swimming ==
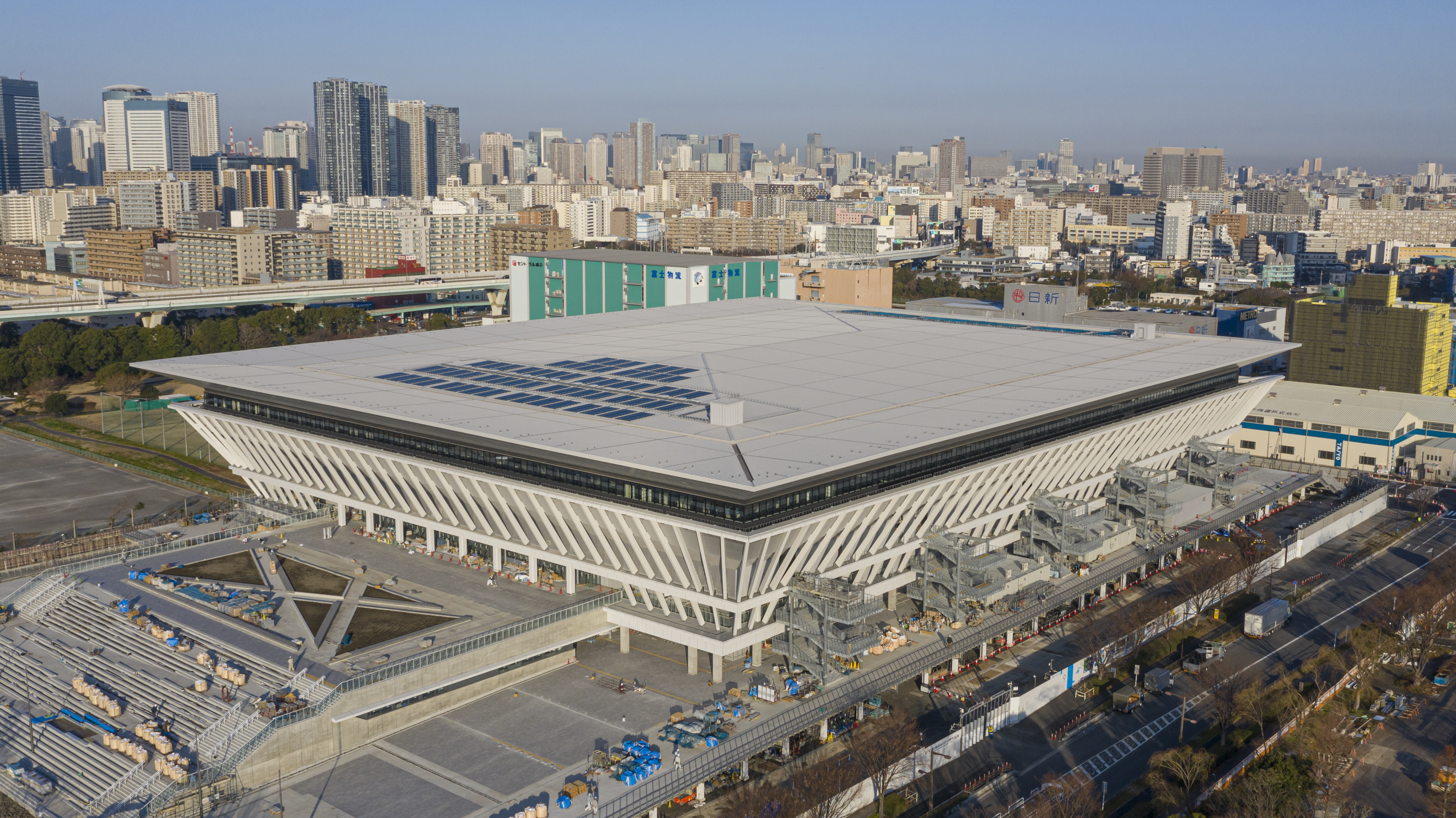
The Tokyo Aquatics Centre, where the aquatic events took place.

Maldives received a universality invitation from FINA to send two top-ranked swimmers (one per gender) in their respective individual events to the Olympics, based on the FINA Points System of June 28, 2021. In May 2021, it was announced that swimmers Ali Im’aan and Aishath Sausan would represent Maldives at the Olympic Games. However, in July, it was announced that both athletes were replaced by Mubal Azzam Ibrahim and Aishath Sajina after FINA brought changes to the qualification standards for countries that did not qualify for the Olympics. Mubal qualified for the universality slot from FINA as his best time of 58.24 seconds was not within the Olympic Selection Time (OST) of 50.03 seconds. Mubal was drawn in first heat of the men's 100 m freestyle which was held on 27 July, finishing sixth just ahead of Edgar Iro from the Solomon Islands with a time of 58.37 seconds. He finished 69th of all swimmers who competed, and did not advance to the later stages of the 100 m freestyle.

Aishath Sajina made her Olympic debut at the 2020 Olympics in the women's 100 m breaststroke. Like Mubal, Sajina qualified after receiving a universality place from FINA, her personal best time of 3 minute, 4.53 seconds was outside the "A" and "B" qualification standard. Sajina took part in heat one of the women's 100 m breaststroke, which was held on 25 July, finishing last out of six swimmers that started, with a time of 1 minute, 33.59 seconds. She finished last out of 43 swimmers who competed, (Note: Four swimmers, Mariama Touré, Claudia Verdino, Benedetta Pilato and Anastasia Gorbenko, did not start.) and did not advance to the later stages of the women's 100 m breaststroke.

Athlete	Event	Heat		Semifinal		Final	
Athlete	Event	Time	Rank	Time	Rank	Time	Rank
Mubal Azzam Ibrahim	Men's 100 m freestyle	58.37	69	Did not advance			
Aishath Sajina	Women's 100 m breaststroke	1:33.59	43	Did not advance			

== See also ==
- List of Maldivian records in athletics
- Maldives at the Olympics
