= Badminton at the 2012 Summer Olympics – Men's singles =

Men's singles at the Games of the XXX Olympiad
- Venue: Wembley Arena
- Date: 28 July to 5 August 2012
- Competitors: 40 from 34 nations

Medalists
1st place, gold medalist(s)		Lin Dan	China
2nd place, silver medalist(s)		Lee Chong Wei	Malaysia
3rd place, bronze medalist(s)		Chen Long	China

The badminton men's singles tournament at the 2012 Olympic Games in London took place from 28 July to 5 August at Wembley Arena. The draw was held on 23 July 2012. Forty players from 34 nations competed in the event.

Defending Olympic champion Lin Dan of China successfully retained his title, defeating Malaysia's Lee Chong Wei 15–21, 21–10, 21–19, to win the gold medal in men's singles badminton at the 2012 Summer Olympics. The final was a rematch of the gold medal match in 2008, as Lin became the first player to defend his title in the men's singles discipline. His win also made China the first contingent to win gold medals in all five disciplines of badminton in a single Olympics.

In the bronze-medal match, China's Chen Long defeated South Korea's Lee Hyun-il, 21–15, 15–21, 21–15.

== Competition format ==
The tournament started with a group phase round-robin followed by a knockout stage.

== Seeds ==
1. Lee Chong Wei (MAS) (silver medallist)
2. Lin Dan (CHN) (gold medallist)
3. Chen Long (CHN) (bronze medallist)
4. Chen Jin (CHN) (quarter-finals)
5. Peter Gade (DEN) (quarter-finals)
6. Sho Sasaki (JPN) (quarter-finals)
7. Lee Hyun-il (KOR) (fourth place)
8. Kenichi Tago (JPN) (group stage)
9. Simon Santoso (INA) (round of 16)
10. Nguyen Tien Minh (VIE) (group stage)
11. Taufik Hidayat (INA) (round of 16)
12. Jan Ø. Jørgensen (DEN) (round of 16)
13. Shon Wan-ho (KOR) (round of 16)
14. Marc Zwiebler (GER) (round of 16)
15. Rajiv Ouseph (GBR) (group stage)
16. Wong Wing Ki (HKG) (round of 16)

== Results ==
=== Group stage ===
==== Group A ====
Athlete	Pld	W	L	SW	SL	Pts
Lee Chong Wei (MAS)	1	1	0	2	1	1
Ville Lång (FIN)	1	0	1	1	2	0

30 July, 20:15
Athlete 1	Score	Athlete 2
Lee Chong Wei (MAS)	21–8; 14–21; 21–11	Ville Lång (FIN)

==== Group B ====
Athlete	Pld	W	L	SW	SL	Pts
Simon Santoso (INA)	2	2	0	4	0	2
Raul Must (EST)	2	1	1	2	2	1
Michael Lahnsteiner (AUT)	2	0	2	0	4	0

Athlete 1	Score	Athlete 2
28 July, 20:19
Michael Lahnsteiner (AUT)	14–21; 18–21	Raul Must (EST)
29 July, 13:07
Simon Santoso (INA)	21–12; 21–8	Raul Must (EST)
31 July, 13:07
Simon Santoso (INA)	21–11; 21–7	Michael Lahnsteiner (AUT)

==== Group C ====
Athlete	Pld	W	L	SW	SL	Pts
Niluka Karunaratne (SRI)	1	1	0	2	0	1
Kenichi Tago (JPN)	1	0	1	0	2	0

30 July, 09:07
Athlete 1	Score	Athlete 2
Kenichi Tago (JPN)	18–21; 16–21	Niluka Karunaratne (SRI)

==== Group D ====
Athlete	Pld	W	L	SW	SL	Pts
Parupalli Kashyap (IND)	2	2	0	4	0	2
Nguyen Tien Minh (VIE)	2	1	1	2	3	1
Yuhan Tan (BEL)	2	0	2	1	4	0

Athlete 1	Score	Athlete 2
28 July, 09:42
Parupalli Kashyap (IND)	21–14; 21–12	Yuhan Tan (BEL)
29 July, 19:07
Nguyen Tien Minh (VIE)	17–21; 21–14; 21–10	Yuhan Tan (BEL)
31 July, 08:30
Nguyen Tien Minh (VIE)	9–21; 14–21	Parupalli Kashyap (IND)

==== Group E ====
Athlete	Pld	W	L	SW	SL	Pts
Chen Long (CHN)	1	1	0	2	0	1
Boonsak Ponsana (THA)	1	0	1	0	2	0

29 July, 13:40
Athlete 1	Score	Athlete 2
Chen Long (CHN)	21–12; 21–17	Boonsak Ponsana (THA)

==== Group F ====
Athlete	Pld	W	L	SW	SL	Pts
Wong Wing Ki (HKG)	2	2	0	4	0	2
Brice Leverdez (FRA)	2	1	1	2	2	1
Edwin Ekiring (UGA)	2	0	2	0	4	0

Athlete 1	Score	Athlete 2
28 July, 19:42
Brice Leverdez (FRA)	21–12; 21–11	Edwin Ekiring (UGA)
30 July, 08:30
Wong Wing Ki (HKG)	21–10; 21–8	Edwin Ekiring (UGA)
31 July, 20:50
Wong Wing Ki (HKG)	21–11; 21–16	Brice Leverdez (FRA)

==== Group G ====
Athlete	Pld	W	L	SW	SL	Pts
Peter Gade (DEN)	1	1	0	2	0	1
Pedro Martins (POR)	1	0	1	0	2	0

30 July, 19:44
Athlete 1	Score	Athlete 2
Peter Gade (DEN)	21–14; 21–8	Pedro Martins (POR)

==== Group H ====
Athlete	Pld	W	L	SW	SL	Pts
Son Wan-ho (KOR)	2	2	0	4	0	2
Vladimir Ivanov (RUS)	2	1	1	2	2	1
Hsu Jen-hao (TPE)	2	0	2	0	4	0

Athlete 1	Score	Athlete 2
28 July, 13:40
Son Wan-ho (KOR)	21–15; 21–19	Vladimir Ivanov (RUS)
30 July, 13:07
Hsu Jen-hao (TPE)	15–21; 13–21	Vladimir Ivanov (RUS)
31 July, 13:44
Son Wan-ho (KOR)	21–14; 21–10	Hsu Jen-hao (TPE)

==== Group I ====
Athlete	Pld	W	L	SW	SL	Pts
Jan Ø. Jørgensen (DEN)	2	2	0	4	0	2
Derek Wong (SIN)	2	1	1	2	2	1
Misha Zilberman (ISR)	2	0	2	0	4	0

Athlete 1	Score	Athlete 2
28 July, 20:54
Jan Ø. Jørgensen (DEN)	21–13; 21–12	Misha Zilberman (ISR)
29 July, 13:44
Derek Wong (SIN)	21–9; 21–15	Misha Zilberman (ISR)
31 July, 19:09
Jan Ø. Jørgensen (DEN)	21–17; 21–14	Derek Wong (SIN)

==== Group J ====
Athlete	Pld	W	L	SW	SL	Pts
Lee Hyun-il (KOR)	1	1	0	2	0	1
Rodrigo Pacheco (PER)	1	0	1	0	2	0

29 July, 09:05
Athlete 1	Score	Athlete 2
Lee Hyun-il (KOR)	21–12; 21–7	Rodrigo Pacheco (PER)

==== Group K ====
Athlete	Pld	W	L	SW	SL	Pts
Marc Zwiebler (GER)	2	2	0	4	1	2
Dmytro Zavadsky (UKR)	2	1	1	3	2	1
Mohamed Ajfan Rasheed (MDV)	2	0	2	0	4	0

Athlete 1	Score	Athlete 2
28 July, 09:09
Marc Zwiebler (GER)	21–9; 21–6	Mohamed Ajfan Rasheed (MDV)
30 July, 13:44
Dmytro Zavadsky (UKR)	21–8; 21–8	Mohamed Ajfan Rasheed (MDV)
31 July, 19:44
Marc Zwiebler (GER)	17–21; 21–10; 21–16	Dmytro Zavadsky (UKR)

==== Group L ====
Athlete	Pld	W	L	SW	SL	Pts
Chen Jin (CHN)	1	1	0	2	0	1
Przemysław Wacha (POL)	1	0	1	0	2	0

30 July, 20:50
Athlete 1	Score	Athlete 2
Chen Jin (CHN)	21–15; 21–8	Przemysław Wacha (POL)

==== Group M ====
Athlete	Pld	W	L	SW	SL	Pts
Kevin Cordón (GUA)	2	2	0	4	2	2
Rajiv Ouseph (GBR)	2	1	1	3	3	1
Henri Hurskainen (SWE)	2	0	2	2	4	0

Athlete 1	Score	Athlete 2
28 July, 13:42
Kevin Cordón (GUA)	15–21; 21–12; 21–14	Henri Hurskainen (SWE)
29 July, 20:15
Rajiv Ouseph (GBR)	22–20; 17–21; 21–15	Henri Hurskainen (SWE)
31 July, 13:40
Rajiv Ouseph (GBR)	21–12; 17–21; 19–21	Kevin Cordón (GUA)

==== Group N ====
Athlete	Pld	W	L	SW	SL	Pts
Sho Sasaki (JPN)	1	1	0	2	0	1
Virgil Soeroredjo (SUR)	1	0	1	0	2	0

29 July, 08:30
Athlete 1	Score	Athlete 2
Sho Sasaki (JPN)	21–12; 21–7	Virgil Soeroredjo (SUR)

==== Group O ====
Athlete	Pld	W	L	SW	SL	Pts
Taufik Hidayat (INA)	2	2	0	4	0	2
Pablo Abián (ESP)	2	1	1	2	3	1
Petr Koukal (CZE)	2	0	2	1	4	0

Athlete 1	Score	Athlete 2
28 July, 13:44
Taufik Hidayat (INA)	21–8; 21–8	Petr Koukal (CZE)
29 July, 20:54
Pablo Abián (ESP)	21–17; 16–21; 21–16	Petr Koukal (CZE)
31 July, 09:05
Taufik Hidayat (INA)	22–20; 21–11	Pablo Abián (ESP)

==== Group P ====
Athlete	Pld	W	L	SW	SL	Pts
Lin Dan (CHN)	1	1	0	2	0	1
Scott Evans (IRL)	1	0	1	0	2	0

30 July, 14:15
Athlete 1	Score	Athlete 2
Lin Dan (CHN)	21–8; 21–14	Scott Evans (IRL)

=== Finals ===
Round of 16
A1	Lee Chong Wei (MAS)	21	21
B1	Simon Santoso (INA)	12	8
C1	Niluka Karunaratne (SRI)	14	21	9
D1	Parupalli Kashyap (IND)	21	15	21
E1	Chen Long (CHN)	21	21
F1	Wong Wing Ki (HKG)	17	17
G1	Peter Gade (DEN)	21	21
H1	Shon Wan-ho (KOR)	9	16
I1	Jan Ø. Jørgensen (DEN)	17	13
J1	Lee Hyun-il (KOR)	21	21
K1	Marc Zwiebler (GER)	21	12	9
L1	Chen Jin (CHN)	19	21	21
M1	Kevin Cordón (GUA)	21	10
N1	Sho Sasaki (JPN)	23	21
O1	Taufik Hidayat (INA)	9	12
P1	Lin Dan (CHN)	21	21

Quarter-finals
A1	Lee Chong Wei (MAS)	21	21
D1	Parupalli Kashyap (IND)	19	11
E1	Chen Long (CHN)	21	21
G1	Peter Gade (DEN)	16	13
J1	Lee Hyun-il (KOR)	21	21
L1	Chen Jin (CHN)	15	16
N1	Sho Sasaki (JPN)	12	21	16
P1	Lin Dan (CHN)	21	16	21

Semi-finals
A1	Lee Chong Wei (MAS)	21	21
E1	Chen Long (CHN)	13	14
J1	Lee Hyun-il (KOR)	12	10
P1	Lin Dan (CHN)	21	21

Final
A1	Lee Chong Wei (MAS)	21	10	19
P1	Lin Dan (CHN)	15	21	21
Third place
E1	Chen Long (CHN)	21	15	21
J1	Lee Hyun-il (KOR)	12	21	15
