= Badminton at the 2020 Summer Olympics – Women's singles =

Olympics event

Women's singles at the Games of the XXXII Olympiad
- Venue: Musashino Forest Sport Plaza
- Dates: 24 July – 1 August 2021
- Competitors: 43 from 39 nations

Medalists
1st place, gold medalist(s)		Chen Yufei	China
2nd place, silver medalist(s)		Tai Tzu-ying	Chinese Taipei
3rd place, bronze medalist(s)		P. V. Sindhu	India

The women's singles badminton tournament at the 2020 Summer Olympics took place from 24 July to 1 August at the Musashino Forest Sport Plaza at Tokyo. A total of 43 players from 37 nations competed.

China's Chen Yufei defeated Tai Tzu-ying of Chinese Taipei in the final, 21–18, 19–21, 21–18, to win the gold medal in women's singles badminton at the 2020 Summer Olympics. In the bronze-medal match, India's P. V. Sindhu defeated China's He Bingjiao, 21–13, 21–15. This was India's third consecutive medal in this discipline, and Sindhu became the first Indian woman to win two individual Olympic medals (having previously won a silver medal in the women's singles event in 2016).

Spain's Carolina Marín was the defending Olympic champion, but withdrew from the event due to a knee injury.

== Background ==
This was the 8th appearance of the event as a full medal event. Badminton was introduced as a demonstration sport in 1972, held again as an exhibition sport in 1988, and added to the full programme in 1992.

The reigning champion was Carolina Marín of Spain. Marín was the 4th-ranked player during the qualifying period and would have qualified to return, but withdrew due to an injury. The other two medalists from 2016, silver medalist P. V. Sindhu of India and bronze medalist Nozomi Okuhara of Japan, both qualified with Top-10 rankings. P. V. Sindhu was also the reigning world champion and the only one of the three former Olympic medalists to be medalled again where she won the bronze medal.

== Qualification ==
The badminton qualification system was designed to ensure that 86 men and 86 women receive quota spots; the size of the women's singles field adjusts to hit that target quota. Following revisions due to the COVID-19 pandemic, the qualifying periods were set between 29 April 2019 to 15 March 2020 and 4 January to 13 June 2021, with the ranking list of 15 June 2021 deciding qualification.

There were 38 initial quota places for the women's singles: 34 from the ranking list, 3 from Tripartite Commission invitations, and 1 host nation place. Nations with multiple players in the top 16 of the ranking list could earn 2 quota places; all others were limited to 1. Players were taken from the ranking list in order, respecting the national limits, until the places were filled. Each continent was guaranteed one spot, either through the invitational spots or by replacing the lowest-ranked player if necessary. The host nation spot was unnecessary (Japan qualified two players through the ranking list) and was reallocated to the ranking list.

Additional places beyond 38 were added where players qualified in both the women's singles and one of the doubles events. This resulted in 5 additional places added to the ranking list. One tripartite invitational place was not used. The total qualified list was thus 43 players.

== Competition format ==
The tournament was started with a group phase round-robin followed by a knockout stage. For the group stage, the players were divided into between 12 and 16 groups of between 3 and 4 players each. Each group was played in a round-robin. Players finishing top in each group advanced to the knockout rounds. The knockout stage was a four-round single elimination tournament with a bronze medal match. If there were fewer than 16 groups in the group stage, some players would receive a bye in the round of 16.

Matches were played best-of-three games. Each game was played to 21, except that a player must win by 2 unless the score reached 30–29.

== Schedule ==
The tournament was held over a 10-day period, with 9 competition days and a 1 open day.

Legend

P	Preliminaries	R	Round of 16	QF	Quarter-finals	SF	Semi-finals	M	Medal matches

Date	24 Jul		25 Jul		26 Jul		27 Jul		28 Jul		29 Jul		30 Jul		31 Jul		1 Aug		2 Aug	
Event	M	E	M	E	M	E	M	E	M	E	M	E	M	A	M	E	A	E	A	E
Women's singles	P										R		QF			SF		M		

== Seeds ==
A total of 14 players were given seeds.

1. Chen Yufei (CHN) (gold medalist)
2. Tai Tzu-ying (TPE) (silver medalist)
3. Nozomi Okuhara (JPN) (quarter-finals)
4. Akane Yamaguchi (JPN) (quarter-finals)
5. Ratchanok Intanon (THA) (quarter-finals)
6. P. V. Sindhu (IND) (bronze medalist)
7. An Se-young (KOR) (quarter-finals)
8. He Bingjiao (CHN) (fourth place)
9. Michelle Li (CAN) (round of 16)
10. Busanan Ongbamrungphan (THA) (round of 16)
11. Beiwen Zhang (USA) (round of 16)
12. Kim Ga-eun (KOR) (round of 16)
13. Mia Blichfeldt (DEN) (round of 16)
14. Gregoria Mariska Tunjung (INA) (round of 16)

== Group stage ==
The group stage was played from 24 to 28 July. The winner of each group advanced to the knockout rounds.

=== Group A ===
Pos	Team	Pld	W	L	GF	GA	GD	PF	PA	PD	Pts	Qualification
1	Chen Yufei (CHN)	2	2	0	4	0	+4	84	31	+53	2	Advance to quarter-finals
2	Neslihan Yiğit (TUR)	2	1	1	2	2	0	65	52	+13	1	
3	Doha Hany (EGY)	2	0	2	0	4	−4	18	84	−66	0	

Source: TOCOG

Date	Time	Player 1	Score	Player 2	Game 1	Game 2	Game 3
25 July	11:20	Chen Yufei (China)	2–0 (Note: Archived 26 July 2021 at the Wayback Machine)	(Egypt) Doha Hany	21–5	21–3	
27 July	11:20	Neslihan Yiğit (Turkey)	2–0 (Note: Archived 27 July 2021 at the Wayback Machine)	(Egypt) Doha Hany	21–5	21–5	
28 July	12:20	Chen Yufei (China)	2–0 (Note: Archived 28 July 2021 at the Wayback Machine)	(Turkey) Neslihan Yiğit	21–14	21–9	

=== Group C ===
Pos	Team	Pld	W	L	GF	GA	GD	PF	PA	PD	Pts	Qualification
1	An Se-young (KOR)	2	2	0	4	0	+4	84	30	+54	2	Advance to elimination round
2	Clara Azurmendi (ESP)	2	1	1	2	2	0	63	54	+9	1	
3	Dorcas Ajoke Adesokan (NGR)	2	0	2	0	4	−4	21	84	−63	0	

Source: TOCOG

Date	Time	Player 1	Score	Player 2	Game 1	Game 2	Game 3
24 July	20:00	An Se-young (South Korea)	2–0 (Note: Archived 28 July 2021 at the Wayback Machine)	(Spain) Clara Azurmendi	21–13	21–8	
26 July	12:00	Dorcas Ajoke Adesokan (Nigeria)	0–2 (Note: Archived 25 July 2021 at the Wayback Machine)	(Spain) Clara Azurmendi	10–21	2–21	
27 July	19:20	An Se-young (South Korea)	2–0 (Note: Archived 28 July 2021 at the Wayback Machine)	(Nigeria) Dorcas Ajoke Adesokan	21–3	21–6	

=== Group D ===
Pos	Team	Pld	W	L	GF	GA	GD	PF	PA	PD	Pts	Qualification
1	Busanan Ongbamrungphan (THA)	2	2	0	4	0	+4	84	41	+43	2	Advance to elimination round
2	Kristin Kuuba (EST)	2	1	1	2	2	0	70	74	−4	1	
3	Daniela Macías (PER)	2	0	2	0	4	−4	45	84	−39	0	

Source: TOCOG

Date	Time	Player 1	Score	Player 2	Game 1	Game 2	Game 3
24 July	09:40	Busanan Ongbamrungphan (Thailand)	2–0 (Note: Archived 25 July 2021 at the Wayback Machine)	(Peru) Daniela Macías	21–4	21–9	
26 July	18:00	Kristin Kuuba (Estonia)	2–0 (Note: Archived 25 July 2021 at the Wayback Machine)	(Peru) Daniela Macías	21–19	21–13	
27 July	18:40	Busanan Ongbamrungphan (Thailand)	2–0 (Note: Archived 25 July 2021 at the Wayback Machine)	(Estonia) Kristin Kuuba	21–16	21–12	

=== Group E ===
Pos	Team	Pld	W	L	GF	GA	GD	PF	PA	PD	Pts	Qualification
1	Nozomi Okuhara (JPN) (H)	2	2	0	2	0	+2	84	43	+41	2	Advance to elimination round
2	Evgeniya Kosetskaya (ROC)	2	1	1	2	2	0	65	77	−12	1	
3	Yvonne Li (GER)	2	0	2	0	4	−4	56	85	−29	0	

Source: TOCOG
(H) Host

Date	Time	Player 1	Score	Player 2	Game 1	Game 2	Game 3
25 July	11:20	Nozomi Okuhara (Japan)	2–0 (Note: Archived 27 July 2021 at the Wayback Machine)	(Germany) Yvonne Li	21–17	21–4	
26 July	10:00	Evgeniya Kosetskaya (Russia)	2–0 (Note: Archived 25 July 2021 at the Wayback Machine)	(Germany) Yvonne Li	22–20	21–15	
28 July	10:20	Nozomi Okuhara (Japan)	2–0 (Note: Archived 27 July 2021 at the Wayback Machine)	(Russia) Evgeniya Kosetskaya	21–6	21–16	

=== Group F ===
Pos	Team	Pld	W	L	GF	GA	GD	PF	PA	PD	Pts	Qualification
1	Michelle Li (CAN)	2	2	0	4	0	+4	84	51	+33	2	Advance to elimination round
2	Martina Repiská (SVK)	2	1	1	2	2	0	76	73	+3	1	
3	Nikté Sotomayor (GUA)	2	0	2	0	4	−4	48	84	−36	0	

Source: TOCOG

Date	Time	Player 1	Score	Player 2	Game 1	Game 2	Game 3
25 July	12:00	Michelle Li (Canada)	2–0 (Note: Archived 25 July 2021 at the Wayback Machine)	(Guatemala) Nikté Sotomayor	21–8	21–9	
26 July	18:40	Martina Repiská (Slovakia)	2–0 (Note: Archived 26 July 2021 at the Wayback Machine)	(Guatemala) Nikté Sotomayor	21–19	21–12	
28 July	11:00	Michelle Li (Canada)	2–0 (Note: Archived 28 July 2021 at the Wayback Machine)	(Slovakia) Martina Repiská	21–18	21–16	

=== Group G ===
Pos	Team	Pld	W	L	GF	GA	GD	PF	PA	PD	Pts	Qualification
1	He Bingjiao (CHN)	2	2	0	4	0	+4	84	23	+61	2	Advance to elimination round
2	Sorayya Aghaei (IRI)	2	1	1	2	2	0	56	63	−7	1	
3	Fathimath Nabaaha Abdul Razzaq (MDV)	2	0	2	0	4	−4	30	84	−54	0	

Source: TOCOG

Date	Time	Player 1	Score	Player 2	Game 1	Game 2	Game 3
25 July	12:40	He Bingjiao (China)	2–0 (Note: Archived 25 July 2021 at the Wayback Machine)	(Maldives) Fathimath Nabaaha Abdul Razzaq	21–6	21–3	
26 July	11:20	Sorayya Aghaei (Iran)	2–0 (Note: Archived 26 July 2021 at the Wayback Machine)	(Maldives) Fathimath Nabaaha Abdul Razzaq	21–14	21–7	
28 July	11:00	He Bingjiao (China)	2–0 (Note: Archived 27 July 2021 at the Wayback Machine)	(Iran) Sorayya Aghaei	21–11	21–3	

=== Group H ===
Pos	Team	Pld	W	L	GF	GA	GD	PF	PA	PD	Pts	Qualification
1	Beiwen Zhang (USA)	2	2	0	4	0	+4	84	38	+46	2	Advance to elimination round
2	Marija Ulitina (UKR)	2	1	1	2	2	0	62	76	−14	1	
3	Fabiana Silva (BRA)	2	0	2	0	4	−4	53	85	−32	0	

Source: TOCOG

Date	Time	Player 1	Score	Player 2	Game 1	Game 2	Game 3
25 July	18:00	Beiwen Zhang (United States)	2–0 (Note: Archived 26 July 2021 at the Wayback Machine)	(Ukraine) Marija Ulitina	21–12	21–7	
26 July	12:40	Fabiana Silva (Brazil)	0–2 (Note: Archived 26 July 2021 at the Wayback Machine)	(Ukraine) Marija Ulitina	14–21	20–22	
28 July	10:20	Beiwen Zhang (United States)	2–0 (Note: Archived 27 July 2021 at the Wayback Machine)	(Brazil) Fabiana Silva	21–9	21–10	

=== Group I ===
Pos	Team	Pld	W	L	GF	GA	GD	PF	PA	PD	Pts	Qualification
1	Mia Blichfeldt (DEN)	2	2	0	4	0	+4	84	34	+50	2	Advance to elimination round
2	Chen Hsuan-yu (AUS)	2	1	1	2	2	0	83	88	−5	1	
3	Linda Zetchiri (BUL)	2	0	2	1	4	−3	59	104	−45	0	

Source: TOCOG

Date	Time	Player 1	Score	Player 2	Game 1	Game 2	Game 3
25 July	14:00	Mia Blichfeldt (Denmark)	2–0 (Note: Archived 25 July 2021 at the Wayback Machine)	(Australia) Chen Hsuan-yu	21–7	21–14	
27 July	13:20	Linda Zetchiri (Bulgaria)	1–2 (Note: Archived 25 July 2021 at the Wayback Machine)	(Australia) Chen Hsuan-yu	16–21	22–20	8–21
28 July	09:40	Mia Blichfeldt (Denmark)	2–0 (Note: Archived 27 July 2021 at the Wayback Machine)	(Bulgaria) Linda Zetchiri	21–10	21–3	

=== Group J ===
Pos	Team	Pld	W	L	GF	GA	GD	PF	PA	PD	Pts	Qualification
1	P. V. Sindhu (IND)	2	2	0	4	0	+4	84	42	+42	2	Advance to elimination round
2	Cheung Ngan Yi (HKG)	2	1	1	2	3	−1	82	91	−9	1	
3	Ksenia Polikarpova (ISR)	2	0	2	1	4	−3	66	99	−33	0	

Source: TOCOG

Date	Time	Player 1	Score	Player 2	Game 1	Game 2	Game 3
25 July	10:40	P. V. Sindhu (India)	2–0 (Note: Archived 25 July 2021 at the Wayback Machine)	(Israel) Ksenia Polikarpova	21–7	21–10	
27 July	12:40	Cheung Ngan Yi (Hong Kong)	2–1 (Note: Archived 25 July 2021 at the Wayback Machine)	(Israel) Ksenia Polikarpova	21–12	15–21	21–16
28 July	11:00	P. V. Sindhu (India)	2–0 (Note: Archived 28 July 2021 at the Wayback Machine)	(Hong Kong) Cheung Ngan Yi	21–9	21–16	

=== Group K ===
Pos	Team	Pld	W	L	GF	GA	GD	PF	PA	PD	Pts	Qualification
1	Kim Ga-eun (KOR)	2	2	0	4	0	+4	84	50	+34	2	Advance to elimination round
2	Yeo Jia Min (SGP)	2	1	1	2	2	0	69	59	+10	1	
3	Haramara Gaitan (MEX)	2	0	2	0	4	−4	40	84	−44	0	

Source: TOCOG

Date	Time	Player 1	Score	Player 2	Game 1	Game 2	Game 3
24 July	20:40	Kim Ga-eun (South Korea)	2–0 (Note: Archived 25 July 2021 at the Wayback Machine)	(Mexico) Haramara Gaitan	21–14	21–9	
27 July	13:20	Yeo Jia Min (Singapore)	2–0 (Note: Archived 28 July 2021 at the Wayback Machine)	(Mexico) Haramara Gaitan	21–7	21–10	
28 July	09:00	Kim Ga-eun (South Korea)	2–0 (Note: Archived 27 July 2021 at the Wayback Machine)	(Singapore) Yeo Jia Min	21–13	21–14	

=== Group L ===
Pos	Team	Pld	W	L	GF	GA	GD	PF	PA	PD	Pts	Qualification
1	Akane Yamaguchi (JPN) (H)	2	2	0	4	0	+4	84	38	+46	2	Advance to elimination round
2	Kirsty Gilmour (GBR)	2	1	1	2	2	0	69	70	−1	1	
3	Mahoor Shahzad (PAK)	2	0	2	0	4	−4	39	84	−45	0	

Source: TOCOG
(H) Host

Date	Time	Player 1	Score	Player 2	Game 1	Game 2	Game 3
24 July	09:40	Akane Yamaguchi (Japan)	2–0 (Note: Archived 25 July 2021 at the Wayback Machine)	(Pakistan) Mahoor Shahzad	21–3	21–8	
27 July	14:00	Kirsty Gilmour (United Kingdom)	2–0 (Note: Archived 26 July 2021 at the Wayback Machine)	(Pakistan) Mahoor Shahzad	21–14	21–14	
28 July	09:00	Akane Yamaguchi (Japan)	2–0 (Note: Archived 27 July 2021 at the Wayback Machine)	(United Kingdom) Kirsty Gilmour	21–9	21–18	

=== Group M ===
Pos	Team	Pld	W	L	GF	GA	GD	PF	PA	PD	Pts	Qualification
1	Gregoria Mariska Tunjung (INA)	2	2	0	4	0	+4	84	47	+37	2	Advance to elimination round
2	Lianne Tan (BEL)	2	1	1	2	2	0	70	56	+14	1	
3	Thet Htar Thuzar (MYA)	2	0	2	0	4	−4	33	84	−51	0	

Source: TOCOG

Date	Time	Player 1	Score	Player 2	Game 1	Game 2	Game 3
25 July	10:00	Gregoria Mariska Tunjung (Indonesia)	2–0 (Note: Archived 28 July 2021 at the Wayback Machine)	(Myanmar) Thet Htar Thuzar	21–11	21–8	
27 July	12:40	Lianne Tan (Belgium)	2–0 (Note: Archived 27 July 2021 at the Wayback Machine)	(Myanmar) Thet Htar Thuzar	21–6	21–8	
28 July	09:40	Gregoria Mariska Tunjung (Indonesia)	2–0 (Note: Archived 28 July 2021 at the Wayback Machine)	(Belgium) Lianne Tan	21–11	21–17	

=== Group N ===
Pos	Team	Pld	W	L	GF	GA	GD	PF	PA	PD	Pts	Qualification
1	Ratchanok Intanon (THA)	1	1	0	2	1	+1	61	49	+12	1	Advance to elimination round
2	Soniia Cheah Su Ya (MAS)	1	0	1	1	2	−1	49	61	−12	0	
3	Laura Sárosi (HUN) (Z)	0	0	0	0	0	0	0	0	0	0	

Source: TOCOG
(Z) Withdrew after one match

Date	Time	Player 1	Score	Player 2	Game 1	Game 2	Game 3
25 July	19:20	Ratchanok Intanon (Thailand)	~~2–0~~ (Note: Archived 26 July 2021 at the Wayback Machine) (voided)	(Hungary) Laura Sárosi	~~21–5~~	~~21–10~~	
27 July	14:00	Soniia Cheah Su Ya (Malaysia)	N/P (Note: Archived 25 July 2021 at the Wayback Machine)	(Hungary) Laura Sárosi	Cancelled		
28 July	11:40	Ratchanok Intanon (Thailand)	2–1 (Note: Archived 27 July 2021 at the Wayback Machine)	(Malaysia) Soniia Cheah Su Ya	19–21	21–18	21–10

=== Group P ===
Pos	Team	Pld	W	L	GF	GA	GD	PF	PA	PD	Pts	Qualification
1	Tai Tzu-ying (TPE)	3	3	0	6	0	+6	126	70	+56	3	Advance to quarter-finals
2	Nguyễn Thùy Linh (VIE)	3	2	1	4	2	+2	111	89	+22	2	
3	Qi Xuefei (FRA)	3	1	2	2	4	−2	87	108	−21	1	
4	Sabrina Jaquet (SUI)	3	0	3	0	6	−6	69	126	−57	0	

Source: TOCOG

Date	Time	Player 1	Score	Player 2	Game 1	Game 2	Game 3
24 July	09:00	Qi Xuefei (France)	0–2 (Note: Archived 25 July 2021 at the Wayback Machine)	(Vietnam) Nguyễn Thùy Linh	11–21	11–21	
24 July	13:00	Tai Tzu-ying (Chinese Taipei)	2–0 (Note: Archived 25 July 2021 at the Wayback Machine)	(Switzerland) Sabrina Jaquet	21–7	21–13	
26 July	10:00	Qi Xuefei (France)	2–0 (Note: Archived 25 July 2021 at the Wayback Machine)	(Switzerland) Sabrina Jaquet	21–10	21–14	
26 July	14:00	Tai Tzu-ying (Chinese Taipei)	2–0 (Note: Archived 25 July 2021 at the Wayback Machine)	(Vietnam) Nguyễn Thùy Linh	21–16	21–11	
28 July	09:00	Tai Tzu-ying (Chinese Taipei)	2–0 (Note: Archived 28 July 2021 at the Wayback Machine)	(France) Qi Xuefei	21–10	21–13	
28 July	09:40	Nguyễn Thùy Linh (Vietnam)	2–0 (Note: Archived 27 July 2021 at the Wayback Machine)	(Switzerland) Sabrina Jaquet	21–8	21–17	

== Finals ==
The knockout stage was played from 29 July to 1 August. One round was held per day. This stage was a single-elimination tournament with a bronze medal match.

Round of 16
C1	An Se-young (KOR)	21	21
D1	Busanan Ongbamrungphan (THA)	15	15
E1	Nozomi Okuhara (JPN)	21	21
F1	Michelle Li (CAN)	9	7
G1	He Bingjiao (CHN)	14	9
H1	Beiwen Zhang (USA)	21	7^{r}
I1	Mia Blichfeldt (DEN)	15	13
J1	P. V. Sindhu (IND)	21	21
K1	Kim Ga-eun (KOR)	17	18
L1	Akane Yamaguchi (JPN)	21	21
M1	Gregoria Mariska Tunjung (INA)	12	19
N1	Ratchanok Intanon (THA)	21	21

Quarter-finals
A1	Chen Yufei (CHN)	21	21
C1	An Se-young (KOR)	18	19
E1	Nozomi Okuhara (JPN)	21	13	14
G1	He Bingjiao (CHN)	13	21	21
J1	P. V. Sindhu (IND)	21	22
L1	Akane Yamaguchi (JPN)	13	20
N1	Ratchanok Intanon (THA)	21	18	18
P1	Tai Tzu-ying (TPE)	14	21	21

Semi-finals
A1	Chen Yufei (CHN)	21	13	21
G1	He Bingjiao (CHN)	16	21	12
J1	P. V. Sindhu (IND)	18	12
P1	Tai Tzu-ying (TPE)	21	21

Gold medal match
A1	Chen Yufei (CHN)	21	19	21
P1	Tai Tzu-ying (TPE)	18	21	18
Bronze medal match
G1	He Bingjiao (CHN)	13	15
J1	P. V. Sindhu (IND)	21	21
