= Azneem Ahmed =

Maldivian sprinter

- Born: Azneem Ahmed; 1 January 1989 (age 37); Kulhudhuffushi, Maldives

Azneem Ahmed (born in Kulhudhuffushi) is a Maldivian sprinter. At the 2012 Summer Olympics, he competed in the 100 metres where he broke the national record with a time of 10.79 seconds in the heats before being eliminated in the first round. He also holds the national record in the 200 metres with 21.70 and the Men's 4 × 100 m Relay record with 41.39 seconds.
