= Aminath Rishtha =

Maldivian sprinter

Personal information
- Nationality: Maldivian
- Born: 30 May 1975 (age 50)

Sport
- Sport: Sprinting
- Event: 100 metres

Aminath Rishtha (born 30 May 1975) is a Maldivian sprinter. She competed in the women's 100 metres at the 1992 Summer Olympics. She was the first woman to represent the Maldives at the Olympics.
