= Shifana Ali =

Maldivian sprinter

Personal information
- Nationality: Maldivian
- Born: 6 June 1984 (age 41) Malé, Maldives

Sport
- Sport: Sprinting
- Event: 400 metres

Shifana Ali (born 6 June 1984) is a Maldivian sprinter. She competed in the women's 400 metres at the 2004 Summer Olympics.
