= Ahmed Husam =

Maldivian swimmer

Personal information
- Born: November 14, 1995 (age 30) Kibidhoo, Maldives

Sport
- Sport: Swimming

Ahmed Husam (born 14 November 1995) is a Maldivian swimmer. At the 2012 Summer Olympics, he competed in the Men's 100 metre freestyle, finishing in 53rd place overall in the heats, failing to qualify for the semifinals.
