= Ahmed Imthiyaz =

Maldivian swimmer

Personal information
- National team: Maldives
- Born: 24 November 1963 (age 62)

Sport
- Sport: Swimming
- Strokes: Freestyle

Ahmed Imthiyaz (born 24 November 1963) is a swimmer who represented the Maldives at the 1992 Summer Olympics.

Aged 28, Imthiyaz was the oldest of the seven Maldives competitors at the 1992 Summer Olympics, he competed in two swimming events. In the 50 metre freestyle he finished in 71st place out of 75 starters in a time of 29.27 seconds. He also competed in the 100 metres freestyle, where he finished his heat in 1:04.96 and in 74th place.
