= Moosa Nazim =

Maldivian swimmer

Personal information
- Born: 2 December 1974 (age 51)

Sport
- Sport: Swimming

Moosa Nazim (born 2 December 1974) is a Maldivian swimmer. He competed in the men's 50 metre freestyle event at the 1996 Summer Olympics.
