= Sultan Saeed =

Maldivian sprinter (born 1976)

Sultan Saeed (born 1 August 1976) is a Maldivan athlete specialising in the 100 metres.

Participating in the 2004 Summer Olympics, he finished eighth in his 100 metres heat, thus failing to make it through to the second round.
