= Mohamed Amir =

Maldivian sprinter

Personal information
- Nationality: Maldivian
- Born: 27 November 1969 (age 56)

Sport
- Sport: Sprinting
- Event: 400 metres

Mohamed Amir (born 27 November 1969) is a Maldivian sprinter. He competed in the 400 metres at the 1992 Summer Olympics and the 1996 Summer Olympics.
