= Fathimath Nabaaha Abdul Razzaq =

Maldivian badminton player (born 1999)

Personal information
- Nickname: Naba
- Born: 13 June 1999 (age 27) Malé, Maldives
- Height: 1.64 m (5 ft 5 in)
- Weight: 50 kg (110 lb)

Sport
- Country: Maldives
- Sport: Badminton
- Handedness: Right

Women's singles & doubles
- Highest ranking: 103 (WS 13 February 2024); 83 (WD with Aminath Nabeeha Abdul Razzaq 17 October 2023); 78 (XD with Zayan Shaheed 17 October 2023)
- Current ranking: 111 (WS), 99 (WD with Aminath Nabeeha Abdul Razzaq); 109 (XD with Zayan Shaheed) (16 July 2024)
- BWF profile
Medal record
Representing Maldives
Indian Ocean Island Games
Gold medal – first place	2023 Antananarivo	Women's doubles
Silver medal – second place	2019 Port Louis	Women's doubles
Silver medal – second place	2023 Antananarivo	Women's singles
Silver medal – second place	2023 Antananarivo	Women's team
Bronze medal – third place	2015 Réunion	Women's team
Bronze medal – third place	2019 Port Louis	Women's team
Bronze medal – third place	2023 Antananarivo	Mixed doubles

Fathimath Nabaaha Abdul Razzaq (born 13 June 1999) is a Maldivian badminton player. She participated at the 2018 Asian Games in Jakarta, Indonesia. She won two titles at the Pakistan International tournament: the women's doubles, partnered with her sister Aminath Nabeeha Abdul Razzaq, and the mixed doubles with Zayan Shaheed. She represented the Maldives at the 2020 Summer Olympics after receiving a tripartite invitation.

== Achievements ==
=== Indian Ocean Island Games ===
Women's doubles
Year	Venue	Partner	Opponent	Score	Result
2019	Port Louis, Mauritius	(Maldives) Aminath Nabeeha Abdul Razzaq	(Mauritius) Aurélie Allet (Mauritius) Kobita Dookhee	18–21, 21–23	Silver
2023	Antananarivo, Madagascar	(Maldives) Aminath Nabeeha Abdul Razzaq	(Mauritius) Lorna Bodha (Mauritius) Kobita Dookhee	21–15, 21–14	Gold

=== BWF International Challenge/Series (5 titles, 6 runners-up) ===
Women's singles
Year	Tournament	Opponent	Score	Result
2024	Botswana International	(Maldives) Aminath Nabeeha Abdul Razzaq	22–20, 14–21, 21–15	(gold) Winner

Women's doubles
Year	Tournament	Partner	Opponent	Score	Result
2018	Mauritius International	(Maldives) Aminath Nabeeha Abdul Razzaq	(India) Simran Singhi (India) Ritika Thaker	17–21, 12–21	(silver) Runner-up
2019	Pakistan International	(Maldives) Aminath Nabeeha Abdul Razzaq	(Pakistan) Bushra Qayyum (Pakistan) Mahoor Shahzad	21–17, 21–13	(gold) Winner
2023	Botswana International	(Maldives) Aminath Nabeeha Abdul Razzaq	(South Africa) Amy Ackerman (South Africa) Deidre Laurens	13–21, 22–20, 18–21	(silver) Runner-up
2024	Zambia International	(Maldives) Aminath Nabeeha Abdul Razzaq	(Sri Lanka) Hasini Ambalangodage (Sri Lanka) Hasara Wijayarathne	21–17, 21–19	(gold) Winner
2025	Zambia International	(Maldives) Aminath Nabeeha Abdul Razzaq	(South Africa) Amy Ackerman (South Africa) Johanita Scholtz	16–21, 14–21	(silver) Runner-up
2025	Botswana International	(Maldives) Aminath Nabeeha Abdul Razzaq	(South Africa) Amy Ackerman (South Africa) Johanita Scholtz	21–19, 13–21, 15–21	(silver) Runner-up
2025	South Africa International	(Maldives) Aminath Nabeeha Abdul Razzaq	(South Africa) Amy Ackerman (South Africa) Johanita Scholtz	9–21, 26–24, 14–21	(silver) Runner-up

Mixed doubles
Year	Tournament	Partner	Opponent	Score	Result
2019	Pakistan International	(Maldives) Zayan Zaki	(Nepal) Dipesh Dhami (Nepal) Amita Giri	21–16, 21–19	(gold) Winner
2024	Botswana International	(Maldives) Hussein Shaheed	(Azerbaijan) Agil Gabilov (Azerbaijan) Era Maftuha	21–23, 18–21	(silver) Runner-up
2025	Zambia International	(Maldives) Hussein Shaheed	(Egypt) Ezzat Kareem (Egypt) Nour Ahmed Youssri	21–18, 22–20	(gold) Winner

BWF International Challenge tournament
BWF International Series tournament
BWF Future Series tournament

== Awards and honours ==
Individual

- Mihaaru's Best Individual Sports Player: 2017
- Mihaaru's Women's Individual Best Player: 2019
