= Hussain Haleem =

Maldivian long-distance runner

Personal information
- Nationality: Maldivian
- Born: 5 March 1969 (age 57)

Sport
- Sport: Long-distance running
- Event: Marathon

Hussain Haleem (born 5 March 1969) is a Maldivian long-distance runner. He competed in the men's marathon at the 1988 Summer Olympics and the 1992 Summer Olympics.
