= Aminath Shajan =

Maldivian swimmer

Personal information
- Nationality: Maldivian
- Born: October 29, 1993 (age 32) Malé

Sport
- Sport: Swimming
- Strokes: Freestyle
Medal record
Women's swimming
Representing Maldives
South Asian Games
Bronze medal – third place	2016 Guwahati/Shillong	800 m freestyle

Aminath Shajan (born 1993) is a Maldivian swimmer. She was born in Malé. She competed at the 2012 Summer Olympics in London. Shajan also competed in the 2016 Summer Olympics in Rio de Janeiro in the Women's 100 metre freestyle event where she ranked 46th with a time of 1:05.71. She did not advance to the semifinals. She was the flagbearer for the Maldives during the Parade of Nations.

Shajan also competed in the 2010 Youth Olympics.
