= Maldives Olympic Committee =

National Olympic Committee

- Country: Maldives
- [[|]]
- Code: MDV
- Created: 1985
- Recognized: 1985
- Continental Association: OCA
- President: Mr Mohamed Abdul Sattar
- Secretary General: Mr Thamooh Ahmed Saeed
- Website: www.olympic.mv

The Maldives Olympic Committee (IOC code: MDV) is the National Olympic Committee representing Maldives. It is also the body responsible for the Maldives' representation at the Commonwealth Games.

The Maldives was taking part in the 2012 Summer Olympics, and the Maldives Olympic Committee had chosen Bedford as the UK base for its competing athletes.

The Maldives was taking part in the 2020 Summer Olympics, and the Maldives Olympics Committee had chosen Odawara as the Japanese base for its competing athletes.

== See also ==
- Maldives at the Olympics
- Maldives at the Commonwealth Games
