= Flag of the Maldives =

Maldives
- Use: National flag
- Proportion: 2:3
- Adopted: 25 July 1965; 61 years ago
- Design: A green rectangle centered on a red field; charged with a white crescent facing the fly side
- Designed by: Abdul Majeed Didi

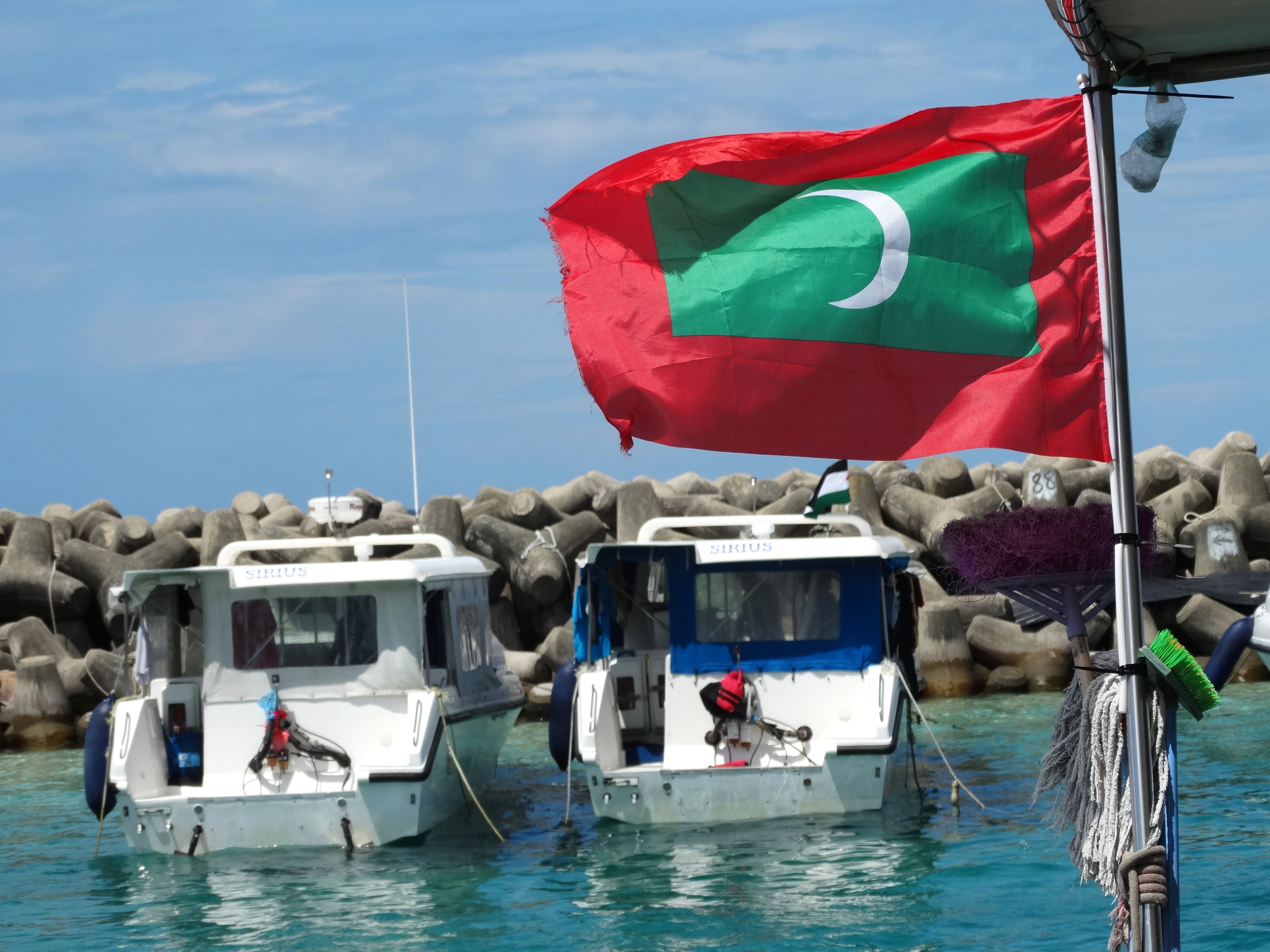
Maldivian flag in Malé

The Flag of the Republic of Maldives (Dhivehi: ދިވެހިރާއްޖޭގެ ދިދަ, romanized: Dhivehi Raajjeyge dhidha) is green with a red border. The center bears a vertical white crescent; the closed side of the crescent is on the raising side of the flag. It was adopted on 25 July 1965.

The red rectangle represents the blood of the nation's heroes, and their willingness to sacrifice their every drop of blood in defense of their country. The green rectangle in the center symbolizes peace and prosperity. The white crescent moon symbolizes Islam, the state religion of the country.

== History ==
First Flag; 1117–1796
Second Flag; 1796–1926
Third Flag; 1903–1926
Fourth Flag; 1926–1953 (State Flag)
Fifth Flag; 1953–1965
Sixth Flag; 1965–present

The earliest flag of the Maldives consisted of a plain red field. Later, a black and white striped hoist called the Dhandimathi (Dhivehi: ދަނޑިމަތި) was added to the flag.

This version of the flag was used until early in the 20th century when Abdul Majeed Didi added a crescent to the national flag. At the same time, a distinct state flag was made, which had the crescent on a green rectangle. These changes were made sometime between 1926 and 1932, during Abdul Majeed's term as prime minister.

In 1953, the Maldives became a republic, resulting in another flag change. The national flag was dropped and the crescent on the state flag was reversed so that it faced the hoist. The Sultanate was restored in 1954, but the flag was not changed back. Instead, Muhammad Fareed Didi created a new flag specifically for the Sultan, with a five-pointed star next to the crescent. A version of this flag is still used today as the Presidential Standard.

When the Maldives gained independence from the United Kingdom in 1965, the black and white hoist was removed, giving the flag its modern form.

== Construction sheet ==
Flag construction sheet

== Gallery ==
1117–1796

1796—1903

1903—1926

National flag, 1926–1953

State flag, 1926–1953

1953—1965

Sultan's Standard with star, used from 1954 to 1965

Sultan's Standard from 1965 to 1968 and Presidential Standard since 1968.

Flag used by the breakaway Suvadive Republic of the southern atolls (1959 to 1963).
