= List of flag bearers for Qatar at the Olympics =

Qatar at the Olympics
- IOC code: QAT
- NOC: Qatar Olympic Committee
- Website: www.olympic.qa/en (in English and Arabic)
- Medals: Gold 2 Silver 2 Bronze 5 Total 9

Summer appearances
- 1984; 1988; 1992; 1996; 2000; 2004; 2008; 2012; 2016; 2020; 2024

This is a list of flag bearers who have represented Qatar at the Olympics.

Flag bearers carry the national flag of their country at the opening ceremony of the Olympic Games.

| # | Event year | Season | Flag bearer | Sport |
|---|---|---|---|---|
| 1 | 1984 | Summer | Waheed Khamis Al-Salem | Athletics |
| 2 | 1988 | Summer | Team did not march in the opening ceremony | – |
| 3 | 1992 | Summer | | |
| 4 | 1996 | Summer | Ibrahim Ismail | Athletics |
| 5 | 2000 | Summer | Ibrahim Ismail | Athletics |
| 6 | 2004 | Summer | Khalid Habash Al-Suwaidi | Athletics |
| 7 | 2008 | Summer | Nasser Al-Attiyah | Shooting |
| 8 | 2012 | Summer | Bahiya Al-Hamad | Shooting |
| 9 | 2016 | Summer | Sheikh Ali Al-Thani | Equestrian |
| 10 | 2020 | Summer | Tala Abujbara | Rowing |
| 10 | 2020 | Summer | Mohammed Al-Rumaihi | Shooting |
| 11 | 2024 | Summer | Shahd Ashraf | Athletics |
| 11 | 2024 | Summer | Mutaz Barsham | Athletics |

== See also ==
- Qatar at the Olympics
