= List of Qatari records in athletics =

The following are the national records in athletics in Qatar maintained by Qatar Athletics Federation (QAF).

== Outdoor ==
Key to tables: Awaiting ratification Record not kept by QAF Not ratified or later rescinded by QAF

=== Men ===
Event	Record	Athlete	Date	Meet	Place	Ref.
100 m	9.91 (+1.8 m/s)	Femi Ogunode	4 June 2015	Asian Championships	Wuhan, China	
100 m	9.91 (+0.6 m/s)	Femi Ogunode	22 April 2016	Tom Jones Memorial	Gainesville, United States	
200 m	19.97 (−0.4 m/s)	Femi Ogunode	11 September 2015	Memorial Van Damme	Brussels, Belgium	
400 m	44.07	Abdalelah Haroun	21 July 2018	Diamond League	London, United Kingdom	
600 m	1:15.77	Mohamed Nasir Abbas	1 February 2019		Pretoria, South Africa	
800 m	1:43.82	Musaeb Abdulrahman Balla	8 July 2015	Catalunya Championships	Barcelona, Spain	
1000 m	2:17.32	Mohamed Al Garni	20 August 2012	Gugl Games	Linz, Austria	
1500 m	3:31.04	Daham Najim Bashir	13 May 2005	Qatar Athletic Super Grand Prix	Doha, Qatar	
Mile	3:47.97	Daham Najim Bashir	29 July 2005	Bislett Games	Oslo, Norway	
2000 m	4:55.57	Mohamed Suleiman	8 June 1995		Rome, Italy	
3000 m	7:30.76	Gamal Belal Salem	13 May 2005	Qatar Athletic Super Grand Prix	Doha, Qatar	
5000 m	12:51.98	Saif Saaeed Shaheen	14 July 2006	Golden Gala	Rome, Italy	
5 km (road)	13:41	Mohamed Al-Garni	31 December 2022	Cursa dels Nassos	Barcelona, Spain	
10,000 m	26:38.76	Ahmad Hassan Abdullah	5 September 2003	Memorial Van Damme	Brussels, Belgium	
10 km (road)	27:57	Ahmad Hassan Abdullah	27 July 2008		Cardiff, United Kingdom	
15 km (road)	43:31	Mubarak Hassan Shami	1 May 2009		Puy-en-Velay, France	
20 km (road)	57:33	Mubarak Hassan Shami	8 October 2006	World Road Running Championships	Debrecen, Hungary	
Half marathon	1:00:27	Nicholas Kemboi	7 April 2013		Rabat, Morocco	
25 km (road)	1:15:00	Nicholas Kemboi	12 May 2013		Prague, Czech Republic	
Marathon	2:07:19	Mubarak Hassan Shami	15 April 2007	Paris Marathon	Paris, France	
110 m hurdles	13.37 (+0.6 m/s)	Oumar Doudai Abakar	27 July 2025	ISTAF Berlin	Berlin, Germany	
300 m hurdles	33.84	Abderrahman Samba	12 June 2025	Bislett Games	Oslo, Norway	
400 m hurdles	46.98	Abderrahman Samba	30 June 2018	Meeting de Paris	Paris, France	
2000 m steeplechase	5:14.53	Saif Saaeed Shaheen	13 May 2005		Doha, Qatar	
3000 m steeplechase	7:53.63	Saif Saaeed Shaheen	3 September 2004	Memorial Van Damme	Brussels, Belgium	
High jump	2.43 m	Mutaz Essa Barshim	5 September 2014	Memorial Van Damme	Brussels, Belgium	
Pole vault	5.75 m	Seif Heneida	13 September 2025	World Championships	Tokyo, Japan	
Pole vault	5.75 m	Seif Heneida	15 September 2025	World Championships	Tokyo, Japan	
Long jump	8.13 m (+0.9 m/s)	Abdulrahman Faraj Al-Nubi	21 September 2003	Asian Championships	Manila, Philippines	
Triple jump	17.15 m (+1.3 m/s)	Ibrahim Mohamed Aboubaker	20 April 2004		Doha, Qatar	
Shot put	20.54 m	Khalid Habash Al-Suwaidi	25 June 2005		Minsk, Belarus	
Discus throw	64.43 m	Rashid Shafi Al-Dosari	12 August 2002		Colombo, Sri Lanka	
Discus throw	64.56 m X	Ahmed Mohammed Dheeb	24 November 2010	Asian Games	Guangzhou, China	
Hammer throw	78.19 m	Ashraf Amjad Al-Saifi	27 March 2016		Doha, Qatar	
Javelin throw	85.23 m	Ahmed Bader Magour	13 June 2017	Paavo Nurmi Games	Turku, Finland	
Decathlon	7730 pts	Ahmad Hassan Moussa	26–27 June 2004		Ratingen, Germany	
Decathlon	100m / Long jump / Shot put / High jump / 400m / 110m H / Discus / Pole vault / Javelin / 1500m; 10.91 / 7.10 m / 13.60 m / 1.80 m / 48.84 / 15.01 / 42.65 m / 4.20 m / 65.94 m / 4:30.22					
10 km walk (road)	42:25.12	Waleed Ahmed	20 August 2005		Belgium	
20 km walk (road)	1:26:26	Mabrook Saleh Mohamed	14 September 2013	Jeux de la Francophonie	Nice, France	
50 km walk (road)	5:30:00	Mohamed Salim	12 July 1982		Belgium	
4 × 100 m relay	39.05	Qatar; Jassim Abbas; Sultan Mohamed Al-Sheib; Sulaiman Jama Yusuf; Saad Al-Kuwari	9 August 1997	World Championships	Athens, Greece	
4 × 400 m relay	2:59.83 A	Qatar; Ammar Ibrahim; Bassem Hemeida; Youssouf Djibrine; Ashraf Osman	2 May 2026	World Relays	Gaborene, Botswana	
4 × 800 m relay	7:06.66	Qatar; Majed Saeed Sultan; Salem Amer Al-Badri; Abdulrahman Suleiman; Abubaker Ali Kamal	25 August 2006	Memorial Van Damme	Brussels, Belgium	
4 × 1500 m relay	15:10.77	Qatar; Mohamad Al-Garni; Hashim Salah Mohamed; Maaz Abdelrahman Shagag; Abubaker Ali Kamal	25 May 2014	IAAF World Relays	Nassau, Bahamas	

=== Women ===
Event	Record	Athlete	Date	Meet	Place	Ref.,
100 m	12.69 NWI	Jyothi Janardhanan	5 April 2009		Doha, Qatar	
100 m	11.32 (+0.4 m/s)	Fawziyah Afoke Mansoor	16 May 2025	Doha Diamond League	Doha, Qatar	
200 m	26.28 NWI	Mariam Mamdouh Ferid	2 March 2016		Doha, Qatar	
400 m	1:01.88	Kenza Sosse	21 April 2019	Asian Championships	Doha, Qatar	
400 m	59.65	Saja Issa Saadoun	27 April 2023	West Asian Championships	Doha, Qatar	
400 m	55.98	Shahd Ashraf (Note: Ashraf ran a personal best of 54.98 in 2020 as an Australian; she has been eligible to represent Qatar since 22 January 2024.)	29 April 2024	Qatari Championships - Emir Cup	Doha, Qatar	
800 m	2:32.45	Nada Nabil Abdullah	1 July 2009		Singapore	
1000 m	3:28.87	Nada Nabil Abdullah	28 April 2009		Doha, Qatar	
1500 m	5:25.61	Nada Nabil Abdullah	17 July 2010	Ogólnopolski Meeting	Bydgoszcz, Poland	
3000 m						
5000 m						
5 km (road)	25:15+	Dana Al-Mannai	17 January 2025	Ooredoo Half Marathon	Doha, Qatar	
10,000 m						
10 km (road)	49:30+	Dana Al-Mannai	17 January 2025	Ooredoo Half Marathon	Doha, Qatar	
15 km (road)	1:13:51+	Dana Al-Mannai	17 January 2025	Ooredoo Half Marathon	Doha, Qatar	
10 miles (road)	1:33:59+	Hanoof Al-Thani	3 November 2019	New York City Marathon	New York City, United States	
20 km (road)	1:37:38+	Dana Al-Mannai	17 January 2025	Ooredoo Half Marathon	Doha, Qatar	
Half marathon	1:42:42	Dana Al-Mannai	17 January 2025	Ooredoo Half Marathon	Doha, Qatar	
25 km (road)	2:23:44+	Hanoof Al-Thani	3 October 2021	London Marathon	London, United Kingdom	
30 km (road)	2:57:10+	Hanoof Al-Thani	3 October 2021	London Marathon	London, United Kingdom	
Marathon	4:23:30	Hanoof Al-Thani	3 October 2021	London Marathon	London, United Kingdom	
Marathon	3:50:55	Rabaah Al-Musleh	20 January 2023	Ooredoo International Marathon	Doha, Qatar	
100 m hurdles	16.02 NWI	Fatma Mathaher Sassani	14 March 2015	4th GCC Women's Games	Muscat, Oman	
400 m hurdles	1:08.46	Saja Saadoun	17 May 2022	GCC Games	Kuwait City, Kuwait	
400 m hurdles	1:07.09	Saja Saadoun	28 April 2023	West Asian Championships	Doha, Qatar	
400 m hurdles	1:06.34	Saja Saadoun	24 May 2023	1st Arab U23 Championships	Radès, Tunisia	
400 m hurdles	1:05.46	Mariam Mamdouh Farid	10 May 2024	International Ultimate Racenight Meeting	Dubai, United Arab Emirates	
400 m hurdles	1:04.32	Mariam Mamdouh Farid	15 June 2024	Championnats d'Île-de-France Espoirs - Seniors J2 et J3	Cergy-Pontoise, France	
400 m hurdles	1:04.32	Mariam Mamdouh Farid	16 June 2024	Championnats d'Île-de-France Espoirs - Seniors J2 et J3	Cergy-Pontoise, France	
3000 m steeplechase						
High jump	1.52 m (Note: record set during heptathlon competition)	Lial Tamam	17 May 2022	GCC Games	Kuwait City, Kuwait	
Pole vault	3.40 m	Samar Mansouri	16 May 2022	GCC Games	Kuwait City, Kuwait	
Pole vault	3.40 m	Samar Mansouri	26 May 2022		Radès, Tunisia	
Long jump	5.16 m	Reyma Alen Thomas	5 April 2009		Doha, Qatar	
Triple jump	11.62 m NWI	Bashair Obaid Al-Manwari	26 April 2023	West Asian Championships	Doha, Qatar	
Shot put	11.97 m	Sarah Ahmad Al-Mannai	8 May 2016		Tlemcen, Algeria	
Discus throw	36.74 m	Asrar Al-Manai	14 March 2015	4th GCC Women's Games	Muscat, Oman	
Hammer throw	50.79 m	Rania Raed Al-Naji	7 June 2018	Asian Junior Championships	Gifu, Japan	
Javelin throw	38.81 m	Sarah Ahmad Al-Mannai	15 April 2016		Manama, Bahrain	
Heptathlon	3770 pts	Fatima Mazaher Sassani	14–15 March 2015	4th GCC Women's Games	Muscat, Oman	
Heptathlon	100m H / High jump / Shot put / 200m / Long jump / Javelin / 800m; 16.02 / 1.35 m / 8.76 m / 27.64 / 4.96 m / 29.01 m / 2:48.10					
20 km walk (road)						
50 km walk (road)						
4 × 100 m relay	50.73	Qatar; R. Labidli; M. Al-Manai; M. M. Farid; B. Al-Manouari	14 March 2015	4th GCC Women's Games	Muscat, Oman	
4 × 400 m relay	4:24.80	Qatar; Jyothi Janardhanan; Nada Nabil Abdullah; A.M. Al-Meamari; Fatima Mazaher Sassani	28 August 2008		Amman, Jordan	
4 × 400 m relay	4:24.17	Qatar; S. R. Mansouri; Saja Issa Saadoun; Bashair Obaid Al-Manwari; L. T. Ibrahim	29 April 2023	West Asian Championships	Doha, Qatar	

=== Mixed ===
Event	Record	Athlete	Date	Meet	Place	Ref.
4 × 400 m relay	3:39.09	Qatar; H. I. Issaka; S. I. Saadoun; B. O. Al-Manwari; A. E. Ebed	26 April 2023	West Asian Championships	Doha, Qatar	
4 × 400 m relay	3:34.97	Qatar	20 May 2024	1st Asian Relay Championships	Bangkok, Thailand	
4 × 400 m relay	3:30.30	Qatar; A. H. Ibrahim; S. M. Ashraf; A. Y. Ibrahim; S. I. Saadoun	29 May 2024	West Asian Championships	Basra, Iraq	

== Indoor ==
=== Men ===
Event	Record	Athlete	Date	Meet	Place	Ref.
60 m	6.51	Talal Mansour	6 March 1993	BW-Bank Meeting	Karlsruhe, Germany	
60 m	6.51 A	Femi Ogunode	25 January 2014	NAU Invitational	Flagstaff, United States	
60 m	6.50 A	Tosin Ogunode (Note: mark recorded before change of citizenship)	25 January 2014	NAU Invitational	Flagstaff, United States	
200 m	21.36	Femi Seun Ogunode	4 February 2010	Gugl Indoor	Linz, Austria	
400 m	45.39	Abdalleleh Haroun	19 February 2015	XL Galan	Stockholm, Sweden	
500 m	59.83	Abdalleleh Haroun	17 February 2016	Globen Galan	Stockholm, Sweden	
600 m	1:15.83	Musaeb Abdulrahman Balla	2 February 2014	Russian Winter Meeting	Moscow, Russia	
800 m	1:45.48	Musaeb Abdulrahman Balla	19 February 2015	XL Galan	Stockholm, Sweden	
1000 m	2:21.71	Musaeb Abdulrahman Balla	19 February 2011	Aviva Indoor Grand Prix	Birmingham, United Kingdom	
1500 m	3:36.35	Mohamed Al-Garni	20 February 2016	Asian Championships	Doha, Qatar	
Mile	3:57.05	Mohamed Suleiman	20 February 1993	Aviva Indoor Grand Prix	Birmingham, United Kingdom	
3000 m	7:39.23	Mohamed Al-Garni	21 February 2016	Asian Championships	Doha, Qatar	
5000 m	13:19.10	Essa Ismail Rashed	3 February 2010	PSD Bank Meeting	Düsseldorf, Germany	
60 m hurdles	7.66	Oumar Doudai Abakar	22 March 2025	World Championships	Nanjing, China	
High jump	2.41 m	Mutaz Essa Barshim	18 February 2015	Athlone IT International Grand Prix	Athlone, Ireland	
Pole vault	5.10 m	Waleed Al-Shamali	8 February 1990		Budapest, Hungary	
Pole vault	5.35 m	Seifeldin Mohamed Abdelsalam	12 February 2023	Asian Championships	Astana, Kazakhstan	
Pole vault	5.55 m	Seifeldin Mohamed Abdelsalam	18 February 2024	Asian Championships	Tehran, Iran	
Long jump	7.76 m	Emeka Okoli	8 February 2014		Sliven, Bulgaria	
Triple jump	15.99 m	Rashid Ahmed Al-Mannai	20 September 2017	Asian Indoor and Martial Arts Games	Ashgabat, Turkmenistan	
Shot put	20.09 m	Khalid Habash Al-Suwaidi	12 February 2006		Schio, Italy	
Weight throw	21.89 m	Khalil Bedioui	18 February 2022	Virginia Tech Challenge	Blacksburg, United States	
Heptathlon	5391 pts	Mohammed R.A. Al-Mannai	20–21 February 2016	Asian Championships	Doha, Qatar	
Heptathlon	60m / Long jump / Shot put / High jump / 60m H / Pole vault / 1000m; 7.37 / 7.14 m / 13.40 m / 1.88 m / 8.37 / 4.50 m / 2:51.54					
5000 m walk						
4 × 400 m relay	3:08.20	Qatar; Mohammad Nasser Abbas; Abdulrahman Musaeb Balla; Abubaker Haydar Abdalla; Abdalelah Haroun	21 February 2016	Asian Championships	Doha, Qatar	

=== Women ===
Event	Record	Athlete	Date	Meet	Place	Ref.
60 m	8.11	Bashair Obaid Al-Manwari	19 February 2016	Asian Championships	Doha, Qatar	
200 m						
400 m						
800 m	2:31.67 (Note: outdoor mark ratified as absolute record)	Maroua Mustapha	26 February 2010	Doha Indoor Meet	Doha, Qatar	
1500 m						
3000 m						
60 m hurdles	9.86 (Note: record set during pentathlon competition)	Fatima Mazaher Sassani	21 February 2016	Asian Championships	Doha, Qatar	
High jump	1.45 m	Fayza Abdulnaser Omar	26 February 2010	Doha Indoor Meet	Doha, Qatar	
Pole vault						
Long jump	4.80 m (Note: record set during pentathlon competition)	Fatima Mazaher Sassani	26 February 2010	Doha Indoor Meet	Doha, Qatar	
Long jump	4.80 m	Fatima Mazaher Sassani	20 January 2015		Doha, Qatar	
Triple jump						
Shot put	11.08 m	Sara Ahmed Al-Mannai	19 February 2016	Asian Championships	Doha, Qatar	
Pentathlon	2327 pts	Fatima Mazaher Sassani	26 February 2010	Doha Indoor Meet	Doha, Qatar	
Pentathlon	60m H / High jump / Shot put / Long jump / 800m; 10.40 / 1.26 m / 6.93 m / 4.80 m / 2:48.25					
3000 m walk						
4 × 400 m relay						
