= Qatar at the 2020 Summer Olympics =

- Flag of Qatar
- IOC code: QAT
- NOC: Qatar Olympic Committee
- Website: www.olympic.qa/en (in English and Arabic)

in Tokyo, Japan July 23, 2021 – August 8, 2021
- Competitors: 16 in 7 sports
- Flag bearers (opening): Tala Abujbara; Mohammed Al-Rumaihi
- Flag bearer (closing): N/A
- Medals Ranked 41st: Gold 2 Silver 0 Bronze 1 Total 3

Summer Olympics appearances (overview)
- 1984; 1988; 1992; 1996; 2000; 2004; 2008; 2012; 2016; 2020; 2024

Qatar competed at the 2020 Summer Olympics in Tokyo. Originally scheduled to take place from 24 July to 9 August 2020, the Games were postponed to 23 July to 8 August 2021, because of the COVID-19 pandemic. It was the nation's tenth consecutive appearance at the Summer Olympics.

Fares El-Bakh became the first Qatari Olympic gold medallist.

One of the most memorable events in their second gold medal was Mutaz Essa Barshim who, alongside Italian high jump athlete Gianmarco Tamberi, shared the gold medal respectively, with a memorable quote of Mutaz asking the official "Can we have two golds?".

== Medalists ==
Medal	Name	Sport	Event	Date
Gold	Fares Ibrahim	Weightlifting	Men's 96 kg	31 July
Gold	Mutaz Essa Barshim	Athletics	Men's high jump	1 August
Bronze	Cherif Younousse; Ahmed Tijan	Volleyball	Men's beach volleyball	7 August

== Competitors ==
The following is the list of number of competitors in the Games.

Sport	Men	Women	Total
Athletics	7	1	8
Judo	1	0	1
Rowing	0	1	1
Shooting	1	0	1
Swimming	1	1	2
Volleyball	2	0	2
Weightlifting	1	0	1
Total	13	3	16

== Athletics ==
Qatari athletes achieved the entry standards, either by qualifying time or by world ranking, in the following track and field events (up to a maximum of 3 athletes in each event):

Key

- Note–Ranks given for track events are within the athlete's heat only
- Q = Qualified for the next round
- q = Qualified for the next round as a fastest loser or, in field events, by position without achieving the qualifying target
- NR = National record
- N/A = Round not applicable for the event
- Bye = Athlete not required to compete in round

Track & road events

Athlete	Event	Heat		Quarterfinal		Semifinal		Final	
Athlete	Event	Result	Rank	Result	Rank	Result	Rank	Result	Rank
Femi Ogunode	Men's 100 m	Bye		10.02	2 Q	10.17	8	Did not advance	
Abubaker Haydar Abdalla	Men's 800 m	1:47.45	6	—N/a		Did not advance			
Abdirahman Saeed Hassan	Men's 1500 m	DNF		—N/a		Did not advance			
Adam Ali Musab	Men's 1500 m	3:42.55	15	—N/a		Did not advance			
Abderrahman Samba	Men's 400 m hurdles	48.38	1 Q	—N/a		47.47 SB	2 Q	47.12 SB	5
Bashair Obaid Al-Manwari	Women's 100 m	13.12 PB	6	Did not advance					

Field events

Athlete	Event	Qualification		Final	
Athlete	Event	Distance	Position	Distance	Position
Mutaz Essa Barshim	Men's high jump	2.28	=1 q	2.37 SB	1st place, gold medalist(s)
Ashraf Amgad El-Seify	Men's hammer throw	71.84	26	Did not advance	

== Judo ==
Qatar qualified one judoka for the men's half-lightweight category (66 kg) at the Games. Ayoub El-Idrissi accepted a continental berth from Asia as the nation's top-ranked judoka outside of direct qualifying position in the IJF World Ranking List of June 28, 2021.

Athlete	Event	Round of 32	Round of 16	Quarterfinals	Semifinals	Repechage	Final / BM	
Athlete	Event	Opposition Result	Opposition Result	Opposition Result	Opposition Result	Opposition Result	Opposition Result	Rank
Ayoub El-Idrissi	Men's −66 kg	Minkou (BLR); L 00–10	did not advance					

== Rowing ==
Qatar qualified one boat in the women's single sculls for the Games by finishing third in the B-final and securing the third of five berths available at the 2021 FISA Asia & Oceania Olympic Qualification Regatta in Tokyo, Japan.

Athlete	Event	Heats		Repechage		Quarterfinals		Semifinals		Final	
Athlete	Event	Time	Rank	Time	Rank	Time	Rank	Time	Rank	Time	Rank
Tala Abujbara	Women's single sculls	8:06.29	5 R	8:16.88	3 SE/F	Bye		8:24.24	1 FE	8:00.22	25

Qualification Legend: FA=Final A (medal); FB=Final B (non-medal); FC=Final C (non-medal); FD=Final D (non-medal); FE=Final E (non-medal); FF=Final F (non-medal); SA/B=Semifinals A/B; SC/D=Semifinals C/D; SE/F=Semifinals E/F; QF=Quarterfinals; R=Repechage

== Shooting ==
Qatari shooters achieved quota places for the following events by virtue of their best finishes at the 2018 ISSF World Championships, the 2019 ISSF World Cup series, and Asian Championships, as long as they obtained a minimum qualifying score (MQS) by May 31, 2020.

Athlete	Event	Qualification		Final	
Athlete	Event	Points	Rank	Points	Rank
Mohammed Al-Rumaihi	Men's trap	121	13	did not advance	

== Swimming ==
Qatar received a universality invitation from FINA to send two top-ranked swimmers (one per gender) to the Olympics, based on the FINA Points System of June 28, 2021.

Athlete	Event	Heat		Semifinal		Final	
Athlete	Event	Time	Rank	Time	Rank	Time	Rank
Abdulaziz Al-Obaidly	Men's 200 m breaststroke	2:23.22	39	did not advance			
Nada Arkaji	Women's 50 m freestyle	DNS		did not advance			

== Volleyball ==
=== Beach ===
Qatar men's beach volleyball pair qualified directly for the Olympics by virtue of their nation's top 15 placement in the FIVB Olympic Rankings of 13 June 2021.

Athlete	Event	Preliminary round				Repechage	Round of 16	Quarterfinals	Semifinals	Final / BM	
Athlete	Event	Opposition Score	Opposition Score	Opposition Score	Rank	Opposition Score	Opposition Score	Opposition Score	Opposition Score	Opposition Score	Rank
Ahmed Tijan; Cherif Younousse	Men's	Gerson / Heidrich (SUI); W (21–17, 21–16)	Carambula / Rossi (ITA); W (24–22, 21–13)	Crabb / Gibb (USA); W (21–18, 21–17)	1 Q	Bye	Dalhausser / Lucena (USA); W 2–1 (14–21, 21–19, 15–11)	Lupo / Nicolai (ITA); W 2–0 (21–17, 23–21)	Krasilnikov / Stoyanovskiy (ROC); L 0–2 (19–21, 17–21)	Pļaviņš / Točs (LAT); W 2–0 (21–12, 21–18)	3rd place, bronze medalist(s)

== Weightlifting ==
Qatar entered one weightlifter into the Olympic competition. Rio 2016 Olympian Fares Ibrahim topped the field of eight highest-ranked weightlifters in the men's 96 kg category based on the IWF Absolute World Rankings.

Athlete	Event	Snatch		Clean & Jerk		Total	Rank
Athlete	Event	Result	Rank	Result	Rank	Total	Rank
Fares Ibrahim	Men's −96 kg	177	4	225	1	402	1st place, gold medalist(s)
