= Qatar at the 2017 World Aquatics Championships =

- Flag of Qatar
- FINA code: QAT
- National federation: Qatar Swimming Association
- Website: www.qatarswimming.com

in Budapest, Hungary
- Competitors: 2 in 1 sport
- Medals: Gold 0 Silver 0 Bronze 0 Total 0

World Aquatics Championships appearances
- 1973; 1975; 1978; 1982; 1986; 1991; 1994; 1998; 2001; 2003; 2005; 2007; 2009; 2011; 2013; 2015; 2017; 2019; 2022; 2023; 2024

Qatar competed at the 2017 World Aquatics Championships in Budapest, Hungary from 14 July to 30 July.

== Swimming ==
Qatar has received a Universality invitation from FINA to send two male swimmers to the World Championships.

Athlete	Event	Heat		Semifinal		Final	
Athlete	Event	Time	Rank	Time	Rank	Time	Rank
Abdalla Aboughazala	Men's 100 m freestyle	55.67	88	did not advance			
Abdalla Aboughazala	Men's 400 m freestyle	4:20.64	51	—		did not advance	
Yacob Al-Khulaifi	Men's 200 m freestyle	1:58.32	66	did not advance			
Yacob Al-Khulaifi	Men's 100 m butterfly	58.42	66	did not advance			
