= Qatar at the 2012 Summer Olympics =

- IOC code: QAT
- NOC: Qatar Olympic Committee
- Website: www.olympic.qa/en (in English and Arabic)

in London
- Competitors: 12 in 4 sports
- Flag bearers: Bahiya Al-Hamad (opening); Mohammed Bakhet (closing)
- Medals Ranked 65th: Gold 0 Silver 1 Bronze 1 Total 2

Summer Olympics appearances (overview)
- 1984; 1988; 1992; 1996; 2000; 2004; 2008; 2012; 2016; 2020; 2024

Qatar competed at the 2012 Summer Olympics in London, which was held from 27 July to 12 August 2012. The country's participation at London marked its eighth appearance in the Summer Olympics since its début at the 1984 Summer Olympics. The delegation sent by the Qatar Olympic Committee consisted of twelve athletes in athletics, shooting, swimming and table tennis. The 2012 Games marked the first time Qatar sent female athletes to the Olympic Games; following the 2008 Summer Olympics, it had been one of only three countries, along with Saudi Arabia and Brunei, to never have done so.

Seven of the twelve competitors automatically qualified for their respective events while the remaining five athletes used wild cards to partake in the Games. This was Qatar's most successful Olympics since the 2000 Sydney Games, winning a total of two Olympic medals. Skeet shooter Nasser Al-Attiyah, and high jumper Mutaz Essa Barshim both won bronze medals in their respective sports for the first time. The latter got promoted to silver in 2021 since the original gold medalist Ivan Ukhov in the event was disqualified.

== Background ==
Qatar participated in all eight Summer Olympic Games from its début at the 1984 Summer Olympics in Los Angeles, United States to the 2012 London Olympics. At the time of the London Games, two Qatari athletes had won medals at the Olympic Games—Mohamed Suleiman and Said Saif Asaad, who won bronze in the 1992 and the 2000 Olympics. Qatar participated in the London Summer Games from 27 July to 12 August 2012. Following the 2008 Summer Olympics, Qatar, along with Saudi Arabia and Brunei, was one of only three countries never have sent a female athlete to the Olympic Games. (Note: Saudi Arabia and Brunei eventually sent woman athletes to the Olympics for the first time in history at the 2012 Summer Games.) In 2010, however, the Qatar Olympic Committee announced that it "hoped to send up to four female athletes in shooting and fencing" to the 2012 London Olympics, and it ended up sending four women in four events. The Qatari delegation to London consisted of 12 athletes: athletics competitors Noor Al-Malki, Musaeb Abdulrahman Balla, Mohamad Al-Garni, Hamza Driouch, Mohammed Abduh Bakhet and Mutaz Essa Barshim, shooters Rashid Hamad Al-Athba, Nasser Al-Attiyah and Bahiya Al-Hamad, swimmers Ahmed Atari and Nada Arkaji and table tennis player Aya Majdi. Al-Hamad was selected to be the flag bearer for the opening ceremony, while Bakhet carried it at the closing ceremony.

== Medallists ==
Medal	Name	Sport	Event	Date
Silver	Mutaz Essa Barshim	Athletics	Men's high jump	7 August
Bronze	Nasser Al-Attiyah	Shooting	Men's skeet	31 July

== Athletics ==
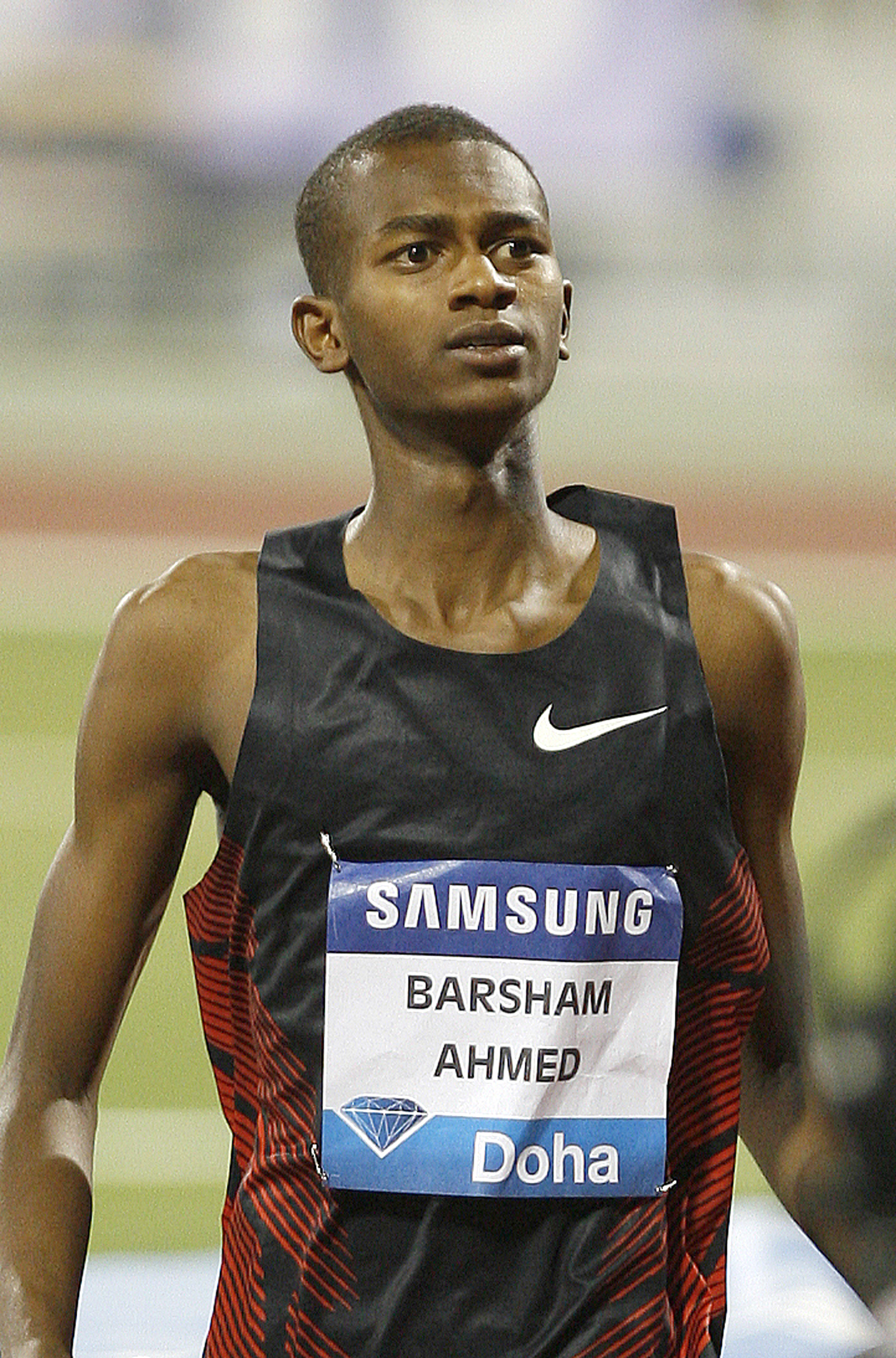
Mutaz Essa Barshim (pictured in 2011) won the bronze medal for Qatar in the men's high jump.

20-year-old Mohamed Al-Garni made his Olympic début at the London Games. Al-Garni qualified for the Games by meeting the qualification standards for the men's 1500 metres; his fastest time of three minutes and 34.61 seconds, set at the 2011 Pan Arab Games, was 0.89 seconds faster than the "A" qualifying standard. Al-Garni was drawn in the first heat on 3 August, finishing fifth out of fifteen runners with a time of three minutes and 36.99 seconds, and progressing into the semi-finals that took place two days later. There, he finished ninth in the second heat, achieving a time of three minutes and 36.78 seconds. Overall, he ranked 14th out of 45 athletes, (Note: Two athletes, Teshome Dirirsa and Amine Laâlou did not start.) and was 1.34 seconds slower than the slowest competitor from his heat to progress to the final.

In his first Olympic Games, 17-year-old Hamza Driouch was the youngest Qatari male athlete in London. He qualified for the men's 1500 metres because his best time was three minutes and 33.69 seconds during the 2012 Qatar Athletic Super Grand Prix, which was one second faster than the "A" qualifying standard. On 3 August, organisers drew Driouch to partake in the second heat, where he finished second out of fourteen finishers with a time of three minutes and 67 seconds; he automatically progressed into the semi-final. There, Driouch ran in heat one but his performance dropped and placed 11th out of 12th runners, with a time of three minutes and 49.40 seconds. That put him 24th overall, with only the top eight progressing into the final.

17-year-old Noor Al-Malki was the first of two woman athletes announced to be competing on Qatar's behalf in February 2012. She received a wild-card invitation from the International Olympic Committee (IOC) to compete at the Olympics after not meeting the qualifying standards of the women's 100 metres. Noor was the first Qatari woman to run in athletics at the Summer Olympics. In an interview with The Guardian before the Games she spoke of her surprise over being selected and she sought to promote women's sport in Qatar, "It was a shock, but it was also a source of immense happiness and pride. It is the dream of every athlete in Qatar, and I will be taking that with me." She was assigned with seven other runners to the third heat on 3 August. Out of the starting blocks, Noor pulled her right hamstring and fell onto the track. She was transported out of the stadium in a wheelchair by officials. Noor was listed as a non-finisher of the women's 100 metres.

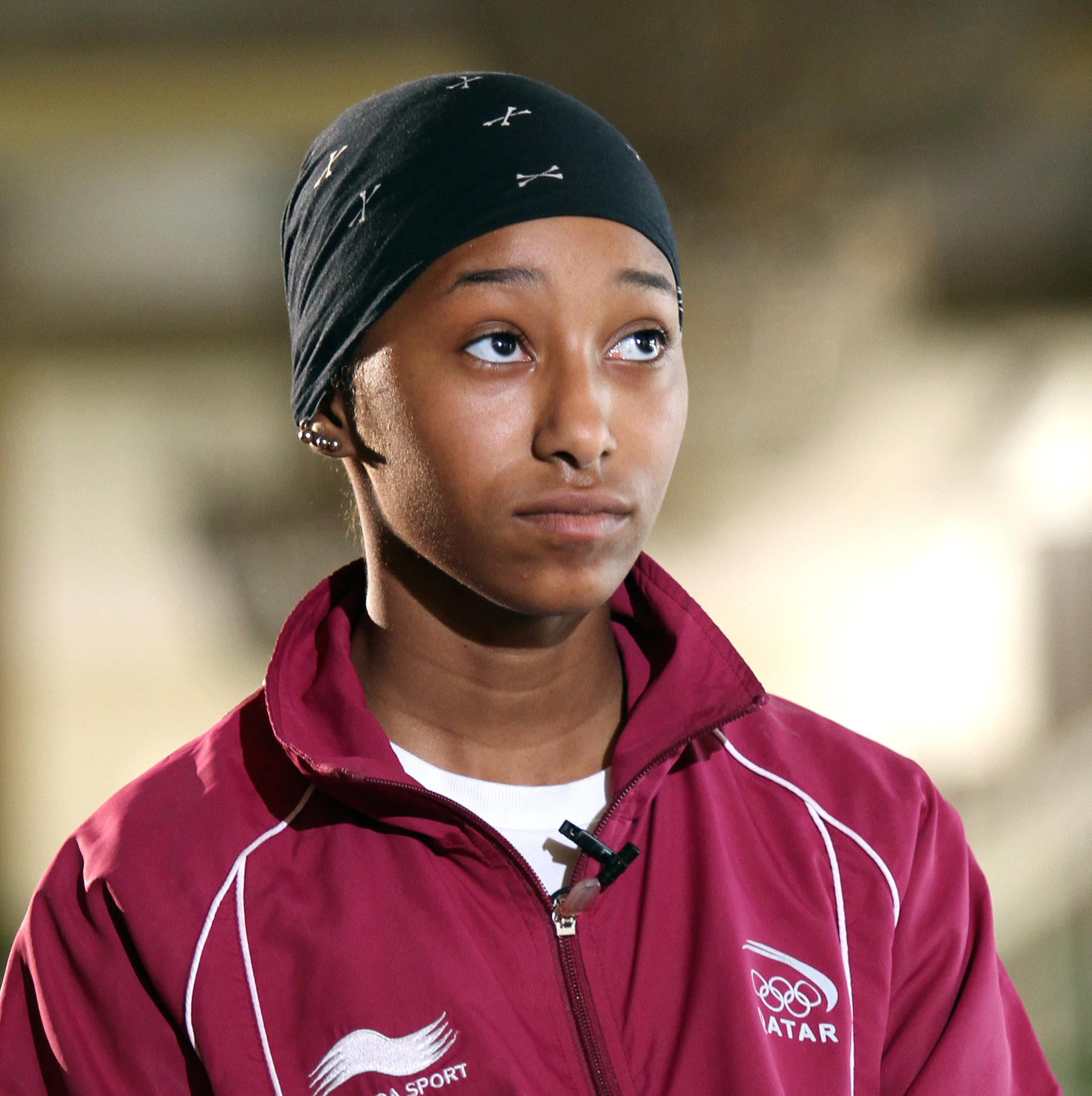
Noor Al-Malki was the first Qatari woman to compete in athletics competition at the Olympics but she pulled her right hamstring at the start of the third heat in the women's 100 metres.

Musaeb Abdulrahman Balla also made his Olympic début at the 2012 Games at the age of 23. He earned automatic qualification for the men's 800 metres because his fastest time of one minute and 45.19 seconds, set at the 2012 Qatar Athletic Super Grand Prix, was 0.41 seconds faster than the "A" qualifying standard for his event. Balla was drawn to run in the second heat of the first round on 6 August, coming second out of eight runners, with a time of one minute and 46.37 seconds. His effort was fast enough to advance him into the semi-finals that took place the day after. There, Balla participated in heat two, finishing seventh out of eight athletes, with a time of one minute and 47.52 seconds. This time put him 21st overall, but only the top eight continued on to the final. (Note: Three athletes were disqualified, and one did not start.)

Making his Olympic début like the others, Mutaz Essa Barshim was 20 years old at the time of the London Games. His best mark of 2.35 metres, set at the 2011 Asian Athletics Championships in Kobe, was 0.04 metres over the "A" qualifying standard to automatically qualify in the men's high jump. Barshim was drawn to compete in Qualifying Group A on 5 August. His best height cleared was 2.26 metres on his second try, tying him for eighth in Qualifying Group A. Barshim's result advanced him to compete for a top 12 placing in the 7 August final. (Note: Three jumpers did not set a mark.) Six athletes, including Barshim, all tied for a mark of 2.29 metres after missing the 2.33 metres mark, and the final result of the high jump was decided by a count-back with the fewest failed jumps factored into the final result. Barshim thus tied for the bronze medal with Robbie Grabarz of Great Britain and Derek Drouin of Canada. In 2021 Barshim along with the two other bronze medallists was promoted to silver after the gold medallist Ivan Ukhov of Russia was disqualified.

The 2012 London Games marked 24-year-old Mohammed Bakhet's Olympic début. His best qualifying time of two hours, 12 minutes and 14 seconds, recorded at the 2012 Dubai Marathon, was two minutes and 46 seconds faster than the "A" qualifying standard for the men's marathon. Mohammad Solaiman, a board member of the Qatar Amateur Athletics Federation, stated Bakhet was "ready" to compete and added the bronze medal won by Mutaz Barshim was an incentive for the athlete to perform better. He competed in the 12 August competition, finishing 68th out of 85 runners, (Note: 20 athletes did not finish.) with a time of two hours, 25 minutes and 17 seconds. Bakhet finished 17 minutes and two seconds behind Stephen Kiprotich of Uganda (two hours, eight minutes and one second), the winner of the marathon. After the Games, he spoke of the disappointment he felt over his performance but said he hoped to use his experience to better prepare for future races.

Key

- Note–Ranks given for track events are within the athlete's heat only
- Q – Qualified for the next round
- q – Qualified for the next round as a fastest loser or, in field events, by position without achieving the qualifying target
- = – Tied for position
- N/A – Round not applicable for the event

Men
Track & road events

Athlete	Event	Heat		Semifinal		Final	
Athlete	Event	Result	Rank	Result	Rank	Result	Rank
Mohamad Al-Garni	1500 m	3:39.67	5 Q	3:36.78	9	Did not advance	
Mohammed Abduh Bakhet	Marathon	—N/a				2:25:17	68
Musaeb Abdulrahman Balla	800 m	1:46.37	2 Q	1:47.52	7	Did not advance	
Hamza Driouch	1500 m	3:39.67	2 Q	3:49.40	11	Did not advance	

Field events

Athlete	Event	Qualification		Final	
Athlete	Event	Distance	Position	Distance	Position
Mutaz Essa Barshim	High jump	2.26	=8 q	2.29	(silver)

Women
Track & road events

Athlete	Event	Heat		Quarterfinal		Semifinal		Final	
Athlete	Event	Result	Rank	Result	Rank	Result	Rank	Result	Rank
Noor Al-Malki	100 m	DNF		Did not advance					

== Shooting ==
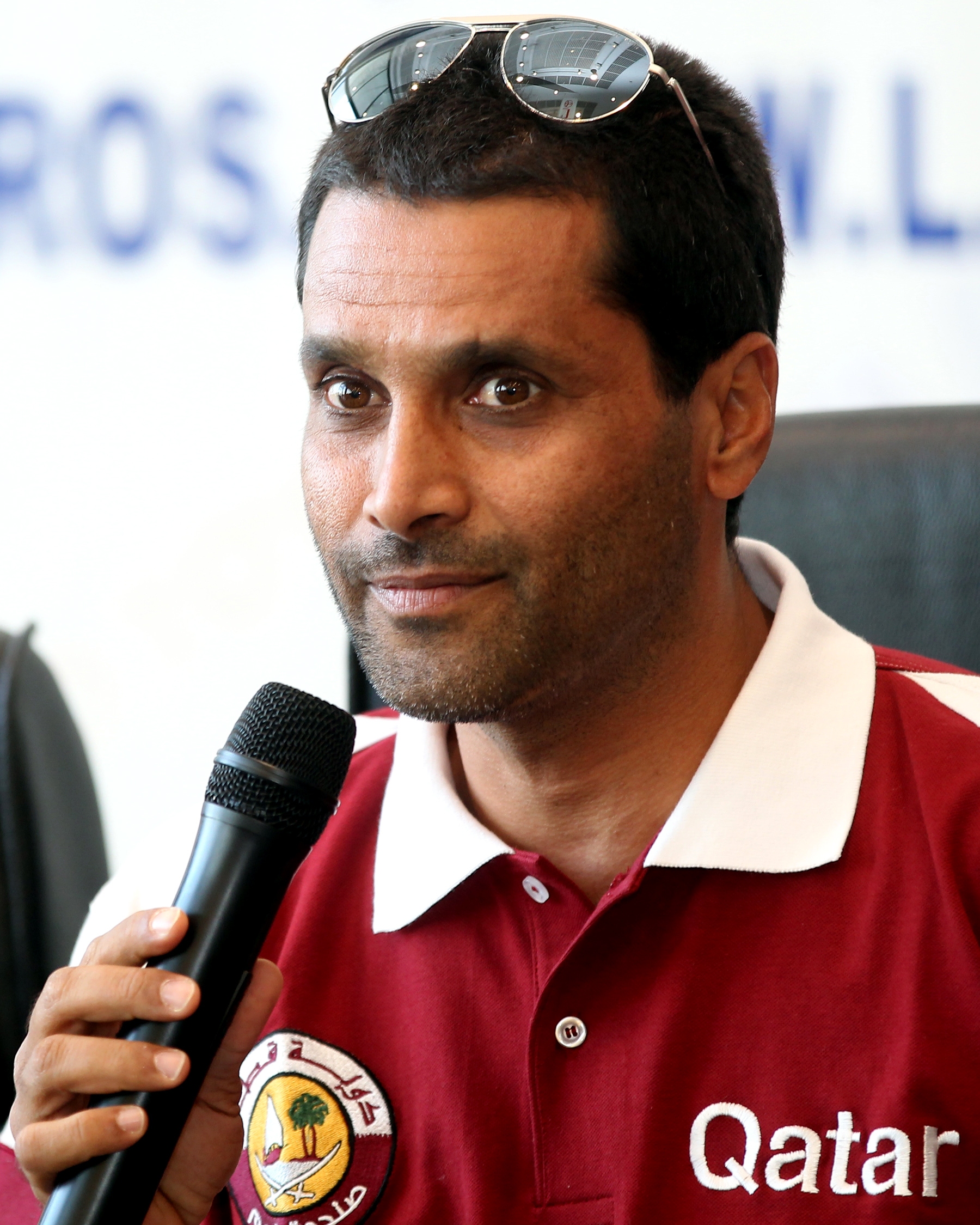
Nasser Al-Attiyah (pictured in 2012) won the bronze medal in the men's skeet shooting competition.

Bahiya Al-Hamad was the third woman to be confirmed as part of the Qatari team to London in April 2012. She qualified for the women's 10 metre air rifle and the 50 metre rifle three positions events after the IOC gave her a qualifying berth. In an interview with CNN before the Games Al-Hamad said, "Every athlete's dream is to reach the Olympics. I will be very excited to go see the atmosphere there and it will sure be one [of] the most special days of my life." She became the first Qatari woman to participate at the Olympics when she took part in the qualifying round of the women's 10 metre air rifle competition on 28 July Al-Hamad came 17th out of 55 participants with 395 points, with only the top eight advancing to the final. Six days later in the women's 50 metre rifle three positions contest, Al-Hamad finished last out of 46 finishing shooters with a score of 555 points, and was eliminated from competing. (Note: One shooter, Alethea Sedgman, failed to start.)

At the age of 41, rally driver Nasser Al-Attiyah was competing in his fifth consecutive Olympic Games. He automatically qualified for a quota spot into the men's skeet because he won the gold medal in the discipline at the 2012 Asian Shooting Championships. Al-Attiyah entered seven contests and visited several training camps to prepare himself for the Olympics. The qualification round of the men's skeet took place on 31 July. He came fourth out of thirty-six shooters with a score of 121 points. This score earned Al-Attiyah automatic qualification for the final that was held on the next day. He held the bronze medal position until he missed two of his targets and entered a shoot-out against Russia's Valeriy Shomin. Al-Attiyah won the shoot-out and the bronze medal after Shomin missed his sixth target. It was Qatar's third ever Olympic medal and its first since Said Saif Asaad's bronze in men's weightlifting at the 2000 Sydney Games.

Rashid Hamad Al-Athba was 31 years old at the time of the London Games, and had previously represented Qatar at the 2004 Summer Olympics. Al-Athba earned an Olympic quota spot by winning the bronze medal in trap at the 2012 Asian Shooting Championships. He entered seven competitions and went to several training camps to prepare for the Games. On 2 August Al-Athba competed in the qualification round of the men's double trap. With a score of 136 points, he finished seventh out of 23 shooters who completed the round. (Note: One shooter, Sergio Piñero, was unable to finish.) Al-Athba scored one point less than the two lowest qualifiers for the final, Håkan Dahlby of Sweden and Richárd Bognár of Hungary, and did not advance. Three days later, he entered the qualification round of the men's trap. Al-Athba came tenth out of 34 shooters with a score of 121 points. He scored one point less than Croatia's Giovanni Cernogoraz and Anton Glasnović who were the lowest qualifying shooters for the final and he was eliminated from the event.

Men

Athlete	Event	Qualification		Final	
Athlete	Event	Points	Rank	Points	Rank
Rashid Hamad Al-Athba	Trap	121	10	Did not advance	
Rashid Hamad Al-Athba	Double trap	136	7	Did not advance	
Nasser Al-Attiyah	Skeet	121	4	144 S/O 6	(bronze)

Women

Athlete	Event	Qualification		Final	
Athlete	Event	Points	Rank	Points	Rank
Bahiya Al-Hamad	50 m rifle 3 positions	555	46	Did not advance	
Bahiya Al-Hamad	10 m air rifle	395	17	Did not advance	

== Swimming ==
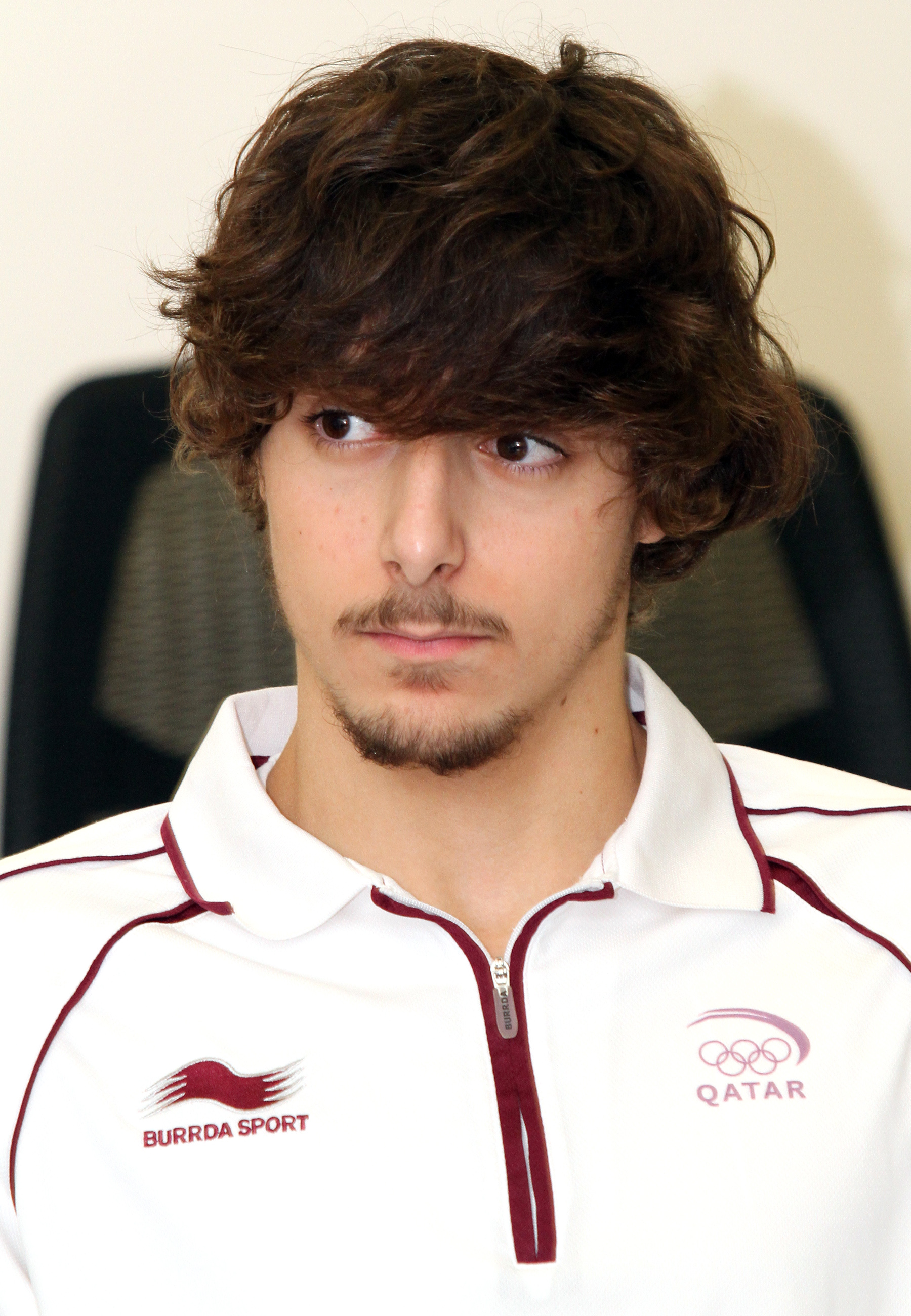
Ahmed Atari attracted media attention for his performance in the men's 400 metre individual medley competition.

Ahmed Atari was 18 years old at the time of the London Olympics and making his Olympic debut. He qualified for the men's 400 metre individual medley by using a universality place that was issued to swimmers who did not qualify on merit from swimming's governing body FINA because his personal best time of five minutes and 16.80 seconds, set at the 2011 World Aquatics Championships, was 48.36 seconds slower than the "B" (FINA/Invitation) qualifying standard for his event. Atari was assigned to compete against four other swimmers in heat one on 28 July. He could not remain underwater for more than half of the first fifteen metres and was distanced by the nearest swimmer a third of the way through. Atari continued to struggle for the rest of the heat but he was applauded by the crowd. His time of 5 minutes and 21.30 seconds (45.50 seconds slower than the second slowest time; itself 12.47 seconds behind the 8th best time) put him 36th and last overall; he was not allowed to progress to the final since only the top eight could advance to that stage. (Note: One athlete, Taki Mrabet, did not start.) Afterwards Atari was dubbed "Atari the Qatari" and the media compared his slow speed and times to that of Equatorial Guinea's Eric Moussambani's at the 2000 Sydney Olympics.

Nada Arkaji was confirmed as Qatar's sole female swimmer in London in February 2012. She received a wild card invitation from the IOC to compete at the Olympics after not meeting the "B" (FINA/Invitation) qualifying standard of the women's 50 metres freestyle. Arkaji prepared for the Games by training for two hours per day at the Aspire Zone. She said in an interview with Reuters four months before the Games that she sought to lower her personal best to below 30 seconds and she wanted to encourage women in Qatar to take up sport, "I always try my best in swimming. I always try to get my personal best. So I think that I have all the potential to reach the top." Arkaji took part in the third heat on 3 August, finishing fourth out of eight athletes, with a time of 30.89 seconds, 5.61 seconds slower than the 16th best time. This placed her 58th overall; only the top 16 progressed to the semi-finals. (Note: One swimmer, Eszter Dara, did not start.)

Men

Athlete	Event	Heat		Final	
Athlete	Event	Time	Rank	Time	Rank
Ahmed Atari	400 m individual medley	5:21.30	36	Did not advance	

Women

Athlete	Event	Heat		Semifinal		Final	
Athlete	Event	Time	Rank	Time	Rank	Time	Rank
Nada Arkaji	50 m freestyle	30.89	58	Did not advance			

== Table tennis ==
Egyptian-born Aya Majdi was 18 years old at the time of the London Summer Games and was announced as a competitor for Qatar at these Games in June 2012. The IOC issued her a special invitation wild card for the women's table tennis singles tournament. Majdi spoke of her pride over being chosen to represent Qatar in London but vowed to qualify on merit for the 2016 Rio Summer Olympics. She was drawn to compete against Zhang Mo of China in the preliminary round on 28 July. Mo beat Majdi in all four of the best-of-seven game's sets 11–3, 11–7, 11–6 and 11–3 to advance to the first round, ending Majdi's tournament. After the match, she stated that competing the game allowed her to broaden her experience.

Athlete	Event	Preliminary round	Round 1	Round 2	Round 3	Round 4	Quarterfinals	Semifinals	Final / BM	
Athlete	Event	Opposition Result	Opposition Result	Opposition Result	Opposition Result	Opposition Result	Opposition Result	Opposition Result	Opposition Result	Rank
Aya Majdi	Women's singles	Zhang M (CAN); L 0–4	Did not advance							

== See also ==
- Qatar at the 2012 Summer Paralympics
