= Qatar at the 2024 World Aquatics Championships =

Country at the World Aquatics Championships

- Flag of Qatar
- FINA code: QAT
- National federation: Qatar Swimming Association
- Website: www.facebook.com/qatarswimmingassociation/

in Doha, Qatar
- Competitors: 5 in 1 sport
- Medals: Gold 0 Silver 0 Bronze 0 Total 0

World Aquatics Championships appearances
- 1973; 1975; 1978; 1982; 1986; 1991; 1994; 1998; 2001; 2003; 2005; 2007; 2009; 2011; 2013; 2015; 2017; 2019; 2022; 2023; 2024

Qatar competed at the 2024 World Aquatics Championships in Doha, Qatar from 2 to 18 February 2024. They were also the host country of the championships.

== Swimming ==
Qatar entered 5 swimmers.

Men

Athlete	Event	Heat		Semifinal		Final	
Athlete	Event	Time	Rank	Time	Rank	Time	Rank
Yousef Al-Khulaifi	50 metre backstroke	Disqualified		Did not advance			
Yousef Al-Khulaifi	50 metre freestyle	25.04	79	Did not advance			
Ali Al-Nuaimi	100 metre freestyle	58.95	96	Did not advance			
Ali Al-Nuaimi	50 metre freestyle	2:07.82	67	Did not advance			
Abdulaziz Al-Obaidly	50 metre breaststroke	28.62	34	Did not advance			
Abdulaziz Al-Obaidly	50 metre freestyle	Did not start		Did not advance			
Mohamed Mahmoud	100 metre freestyle	51.71	52	Did not advance			
Mohamed Mahmoud	50 metre butterfly	24.62	39	Did not advance			

Women

Athlete	Event	Heat		Semifinal		Final	
Athlete	Event	Time	Rank	Time	Rank	Time	Rank
Nada Arakji	50 metre freestyle	31.78	96	Did not advance			
