= Qatar at the 2023 World Aquatics Championships =

- Flag of Qatar
- FINA code: QAT
- National federation: Qatar Swimming Association

in Fukuoka, Japan
- Competitors: 4 in 1 sport
- Medals: Gold 0 Silver 0 Bronze 0 Total 0

World Aquatics Championships appearances
- 1973; 1975; 1978; 1982; 1986; 1991; 1994; 1998; 2001; 2003; 2005; 2007; 2009; 2011; 2013; 2015; 2017; 2019; 2022; 2023; 2024

Qatar competed at the 2023 World Aquatics Championships in Fukuoka, Japan from 14 to 30 July.

== Swimming ==
Qatar entered 4 swimmers.

Men

| Athlete | Event | Heat | | Semifinal | | Final | |
| Athlete | Event | Time | Rank | Time | Rank | Time | Rank |
|---|---|---|---|---|---|---|---|
| Yousef Al-Khulaifi | 50 metre freestyle | 24.92 | 85 | Did not advance | | | |
| Yousef Al-Khulaifi | 100 metre freestyle | 54.34 | 92 | Did not advance | | | |
| Abdulaziz Al-Obaidly | 100 metre breaststroke | 1:05.24 | 54 | Did not advance | | | |
| Abdulaziz Al-Obaidly | 200 metre breaststroke | 2:24.01 | 41 | Did not advance | | | |
| Tameea Elhamayda | 50 metre backstroke | 27.41 | 51 | Did not advance | | | |
| Tameea Elhamayda | 100 metre butterfly | 56.11 | 59 | Did not advance | | | |

Women

| Athlete | Event | Heat | | Semifinal | | Final | |
| Athlete | Event | Time | Rank | Time | Rank | Time | Rank |
|---|---|---|---|---|---|---|---|
| Nada Arakji | 50 metre freestyle | 32.11 | 91 | Did not advance | | | |
