= Qatar at the 2015 World Aquatics Championships =

- Flag of Qatar
- FINA code: QAT
- National federation: Qatar Swimming Association
- Website: www.qatarswimming.com

in Kazan, Russia
- Competitors: 3 in 1 sport
- Medals: Gold 0 Silver 0 Bronze 0 Total 0

World Aquatics Championships appearances
- 1973; 1975; 1978; 1982; 1986; 1991; 1994; 1998; 2001; 2003; 2005; 2007; 2009; 2011; 2013; 2015; 2017; 2019; 2022; 2023; 2024

Qatar competed at the 2015 World Aquatics Championships in Kazan, Russia from 24 July to 9 August 2015.

== Swimming ==
Qatari swimmers have achieved qualifying standards in the following events (up to a maximum of 2 swimmers in each event at the A-standard entry time, and 1 at the B-standard):

Men

Athlete	Event	Heat		Semifinal		Final	
Athlete	Event	Time	Rank	Time	Rank	Time	Rank
Noah Al-Khulaifi	100 m backstroke	1:05.36	64	did not advance			
Noah Al-Khulaifi	200 m butterfly	2:26.71	40	did not advance			
Yacop Al-Khulaifi	50 m butterfly	28.31	63	did not advance			
Yacop Al-Khulaifi	200 m freestyle	2:04.38	77	did not advance			

Women

Athlete	Event	Heat		Semifinal		Final	
Athlete	Event	Time	Rank	Time	Rank	Time	Rank
Nada Arkaji	200 m freestyle	2:30.40	63	did not advance			
Nada Arkaji	100 m butterfly	1:17.30	68	did not advance			
