= Qatar at the 2000 Summer Olympics =

- IOC code: QAT
- NOC: Qatar Olympic Committee
- Website: www.olympic.qa/en (in English and Arabic)

in Sydney
- Competitors: 17 (17 men and 0 women) in 5 sports
- Flag bearer: Ibrahim Ismail Muftah
- Medals Ranked 71st: Gold 0 Silver 0 Bronze 1 Total 1

Summer Olympics appearances (overview)
- 1984; 1988; 1992; 1996; 2000; 2004; 2008; 2012; 2016; 2020; 2024

Qatar was represented at the 2000 Summer Olympics in Sydney, New South Wales, Australia by the Qatar Olympic Committee.

In total, 17 athletes – all men – represented Qatar in five different sports including athletics, shooting, swimming, table tennis and weightlifting.

Qatar won one medal at the games after Said Saif Asaad claimed bronze in the weightlifting men's –105 kg category.

== Competitors ==
In total, 17 athletes represented Qatar at the 2000 Summer Olympics in Sydney, New South Wales, Australia across five different sports.

Sport	Men	Women	Total
Athletics	12	0	12
Shooting	1	0	1
Swimming	1	0	1
Table tennis	1	0	1
Weightlifting	2	0	2
Total	17	0	17

== Medalists ==
Qatar won one medal at the games after Said Saif Asaad claimed bronze in the weightlifting men's –105 kg category.

Medal	Name	Sport	Event	Date
Bronze	Said Saif Asaad	Weightlifting	Men's 105 kg	25 September

== Athletics ==
In total, 12 Qatari athletes participated in the athletics events – Ibrahim Ismail Muftah and Salaheldin Elsafi Bakkar in the men's 400 m and the men's 4 x 400 m relay, Ahmed H. Al-Imam and Mubarak Faraj Al-Nubi in the men's 4 x 400 m relay, Abdu I. Yousuf in the men's 800 m, Mohammed Suleiman and Ahmed Ibrahim Warsama in the men's 5,000 m, Khamis Abdullah Saifeldin in the men's 3,000 m steeplechase, Bilal Saad Mubarak in the men's shot put, Rashid Shafi Al-Dosari in the men's discus throw, Abdulrahman Faraj Al-Nubi in the men's long jump and Rashid Khaled Jamal in the men's marathon.

Key

- Q = Qualified for the next round by position in race or, in field events, by achieving the automatic qualification target
- q = Qualified for the next round as a fastest loser or, in field events, by position without achieving the qualifying target

Men
Track and road events

Athlete	Event	Heat		Quarterfinal		Semifinal		Final	
Athlete	Event	Time	Rank	Time	Rank	Time	Rank	Time	Rank
Salaheddine Al-Safi	400 m	46.16	36	Did not advance					
Ibrahim Ismail Muftah	400 m	45.48	10 Q	45.96	27	Did not advance			
Abdou Ibrahim Youssef	800 m	1:53.23	55	—N/a		Did not advance			
Mohamed Suleiman	5000 m	13:30.12	15 Q	—N/a				13:45.10	14
Ahmed Ibrahim Warsama	5000 m	14:00.30	29	—N/a				Did not advance	
Rashid Jamal	Marathon	—N/a						DNF	
Khamis Abdullah Saifeldin	3000 m steeplechase	8:23.94	8 Q	—N/a				8:30.89	10
Ibrahim Ismail Muftah; Mubarak Al-Nubi; Salaheddine Al-Safi; Ahmed Al-Imam	4 × 400 m relay	DQ		—N/a		Did not advance			

Field events

Athlete	Event	Qualification		Final	
Athlete	Event	Result	Rank	Result	Rank
Abdulrahman Al-Nubi	Long jump	NM		Did not advance	
Bilal Saad Mubarak	Shot put	18.30	34	Did not advance	
Rashid Shafi Al-Dosari	Discus throw	54.47	39	Did not advance	

== Shooting ==
In total, one Qatari athlete participated in the shooting events – Nasser Al-Attiyah in the men's skeet.

Athlete	Event	Qualification		Final		Total	
Athlete	Event	Points	Rank	Points	Rank	Points	Rank
Nasser Al-Attiyah	Men's skeet	122	6 Q	23	6	145	6

== Swimming ==
In total, one Qatari athlete participated in the swimming events – Wael Ghassan in the men's 50 m freestyle.

Athlete	Event	Heat		Semifinal		Final	
Athlete	Event	Time	Rank	Time	Rank	Time	Rank
Wael Ghassan	Men's 50 m freestyle	25.43	61	Did not advance			

== Table tennis ==
In total, one Qatari athlete participated in the table tennis events – Hamad Al-Hammadi in the men's singles.

Athlete	Event	Group stage			Round of 32	Round of 16	Quarterfinals	Semifinals	Final / BM	
Athlete	Event	Opposition Result	Opposition Result	Rank	Opposition Result	Opposition Result	Opposition Result	Opposition Result	Opposition Result	Rank
Hamad Al-Hammadi	Men's singles	Liu (ARG); L 1–3	Boll (GER); L 0–3	3	Did not advance					

== Weightlifting ==
In total, two Qatari athletes participated in the weightlifting events – Said Saif Asaad in the men's –105 kg category and Jaber Salem in the men's +105 kg category.

Athlete	Event	Snatch			Clean & Jerk			Total	Rank
Athlete	Event	1	2	3	1	2	3	Total	Rank
Said Saif Asaad	– 105 kg	185.0	~~190.0~~	190.0	225.0	230.0	~~235.0~~	420.0	3rd place, bronze medalist(s)
Jaber Salem	+ 105 kg	200.0	205.0	~~210.0~~	250.0	255.0	~~260.0~~	460.0	4
