= Qatar at the 2019 World Aquatics Championships =

- Flag of Qatar
- FINA code: QAT
- National federation: Qatar Swimming Association
- Website: www.qatarswimming.com

in Gwangju, South Korea
- Competitors: 3 in 1 sport
- Medals: Gold 0 Silver 0 Bronze 0 Total 0

World Aquatics Championships appearances
- 1973; 1975; 1978; 1982; 1986; 1991; 1994; 1998; 2001; 2003; 2005; 2007; 2009; 2011; 2013; 2015; 2017; 2019; 2022; 2023; 2024

Qatar competed at the 2019 World Aquatics Championships in Gwangju, South Korea from 12 to 28 July.

== Swimming ==
Qatar entered three swimmers.

Men

Athlete	Event	Heat		Semifinal		Final	
Athlete	Event	Time	Rank	Time	Rank	Time	Rank
Yacob Al-Khulaifi	200 m freestyle	1:56.57	60	did not advance			
Yacob Al-Khulaifi	100 m butterfly	56.62	59	did not advance			
Firass Saidi	50 m freestyle	25.20	96	did not advance			
Firass Saidi	100 m freestyle	55.60	99	did not advance			

Women

Athlete	Event	Heat		Semifinal		Final	
Athlete	Event	Time	Rank	Time	Rank	Time	Rank
Nada Arkaji	50 m freestyle	31.57	90	did not advance			
Nada Arkaji	100 m freestyle	1:12.91	88	did not advance			
