= Qatar at the 2022 World Aquatics Championships =

- Flag of Qatar
- FINA code: QAT
- National federation: Qatar Swimming Association
- Website: www.qatarswimming.com

in Budapest, Hungary
- Competitors: 2 in 1 sport
- Medals: Gold 0 Silver 0 Bronze 0 Total 0

World Aquatics Championships appearances
- 1973; 1975; 1978; 1982; 1986; 1991; 1994; 1998; 2001; 2003; 2005; 2007; 2009; 2011; 2013; 2015; 2017; 2019; 2022; 2023; 2024

Qatar competed at the 2022 World Aquatics Championships in Budapest, Hungary from 17 June to 3 July.

== Swimming ==
Qatar entered two swimmers.

Men

Athlete	Event	Heat		Semifinal		Final	
Athlete	Event	Time	Rank	Time	Rank	Time	Rank
Omar Abouelela	200 m medley	2:11.07	39	did not advance			
Omar Abouelela	400 m medley	4:43.16	29	—		did not advance	
Abdulaziz Al-Obaidly	100 m breaststroke	1:05.37	53	did not advance			
Abdulaziz Al-Obaidly	200 m breaststroke	2:21.82	35	did not advance			
