= Qatar at the 2024 Summer Olympics =

- IOC code: QAT
- NOC: Qatar Olympic Committee
- Website: www.olympic.qa/en (in English and Arabic)

in Paris, France 26 July 2024 – 11 August 2024
- Competitors: 13 (12 men and 1 woman) in 5 sports
- Flag bearers: Mutaz Barsham & Shahd Ashraf
- Medals Ranked 84th: Gold 0 Silver 0 Bronze 1 Total 1

Summer Olympics appearances (overview)
- 1984; 1988; 1992; 1996; 2000; 2004; 2008; 2012; 2016; 2020; 2024

Qatar competed at the 2024 Summer Olympics in Paris from 26 July to 11 August 2024. It was the nation's eleventh consecutive appearance at the Summer Olympics.

== Medalists ==
Medal	Name	Sport	Event	Date
Bronze	Mutaz Essa Barshim	Athletics	Men's high jump	10 August

== Athletics ==
Qatari track and field athletes achieved the entry standards for Paris 2024, either by passing the direct qualifying mark (or time for track and road races) or by world ranking, in the following events (a maximum of 3 athletes each):

Key

- Note–Ranks given for track events are within the athlete's heat only
- Q = Qualified for the next round
- q = Qualified for the next round as a fastest loser or, in field events, by position without achieving the qualifying target
- R = Qualified for the repechage round
- NR = National record
- N/A = Round not applicable for the event
- Bye = Athlete not required to compete in round

Track & road events

Athlete	Event	Preliminary		Heat		Repechage		Semifinal		Final	
Athlete	Event	Result	Rank	Result	Rank	Result	Rank	Result	Rank	Result	Rank
Ammar Ibrahim	Men's 400 m	—		44.66 PB	4 R	44.77	1 Q	44.63 PB	5	Did not advance	
Abubaker Haydar Abdalla	Men's 800 m	—		1:48.42	7 R	DNS		Did not advance			
Bassem Hemeida	Men's 400 m hurdles	—		49.82 SB	5 R	49.64 SB	6	Did not advance			
Abderrahman Samba	Men's 400 m hurdles	—		48.35	3 Q	—		48.20	3 q	47.98	6
Ismail Doudai Abakar	Men's 400 m hurdles	—		DNF		Did not advance					
Shahd Ashraf	Women's 100 m	12.53 PB	7	Did not advance							

Field events

Athlete	Event	Qualification		Final	
Athlete	Event	Result	Rank	Result	Rank
Mutaz Essa Barshim	Men's high jump	2.27	=3 Q	2.34 SB	3rd place, bronze medalist(s)

== Shooting ==
Qatari shooters achieved quota places for the following events based on their results at the 2022 and 2023 ISSF World Championships, 2023 and 2024 Asian Championships, and 2024 ISSF World Olympic Qualification Tournament.

Athlete	Event	Qualification		Final	
Athlete	Event	Points	Rank	Points	Rank
Rashid Saleh Hamad	Men's skeet	118	15	Did not advance	
Saeed Abusharib	Men's trap	118	23	Did not advance	

== Swimming ==
Qatar sent one swimmer to compete at the 2024 Paris Olympics.

Athlete	Event	Heat		Semifinal		Final	
Athlete	Event	Time	Rank	Time	Rank	Time	Rank
Abdul Aziz Al-Obaidly	Men's 100 m breaststroke	1:04.31	30	Did not advance			

== Volleyball ==
=== Beach ===
Qatari men's pair qualified for Paris based on the FIVB Beach Volleyball Olympic Ranking.

Athletes	Event	Preliminary round				Round of 16	Quarterfinal	Semifinal	Final / BM	
Athletes	Event	Opposition Score	Opposition Score	Opposition Score	Rank	Opposition Score	Opposition Score	Opposition Score	Opposition Score	Rank
Cherif Younousse; Ahmed Tijan	Men's	Cottafava / Nicolai (ITA); W 2–0 (21–19, 21–18)	Åhman / Hellvig (SWE); W 2–1 (15–21, 21–19, 20–18)	Nicolaidis / Carracher (AUS); W 2–0 (21–14, 21–18)	1 Q	Grimalt / Grimalt (CHI); W 2–0 (21–14, 21–13)	Partain / Benesh (USA); W 2–0 (21–14, 21–16)	Åhman / Hellvig (SWE); L 0–2 (13–21, 17–21)	Mol – Sørum (NOR); L 0–2 (13–21, 16–21)	4

== Weightlifting ==
Qatar entered one weightlifter into the Olympic competition. Tokyo 2020 champion, Fares El-Bakh (men's 102 kg) secured one of the top ten slots in their respective weight divisions based on the IWF Olympic Qualification Rankings.

Athlete	Event	Snatch		Clean & Jerk		Total	Rank
Athlete	Event	Result	Rank	Result	Rank	Total	Rank
Fares El-Bakh	Men's −102 kg	DNF					

== See also ==
- Qatar at the 2024 Winter Youth Olympics
