= Qatar at the 2004 Summer Olympics =

- IOC code: QAT
- NOC: Qatar Olympic Committee
- Website: www.olympic.qa/en (in English and Arabic)

in Athens
- Competitors: 15 in 4 sports
- Flag bearer: Khaled Habash Al-Suwaidi
- Medals: Gold 0 Silver 0 Bronze 0 Total 0

Summer Olympics appearances (overview)
- 1984; 1988; 1992; 1996; 2000; 2004; 2008; 2012; 2016; 2020; 2024

Qatar competed at the 2004 Summer Olympics in Athens, Greece, from 13 to 29 August 2004.

== Athletics ==
Qatari athletes have so far achieved qualifying standards in the following athletics events (up to a maximum of 3 athletes in each event at the 'A' Standard, and 1 at the 'B' Standard).

Key

- Note–Ranks given for track events are within the athlete's heat only
- Q = Qualified for the next round
- q = Qualified for the next round as a fastest loser or, in field events, by position without achieving the qualifying target
- NR = National record
- N/A = Round not applicable for the event
- Bye = Athlete not required to compete in round

Men
Track & road events

Athlete	Event	Heat		Semifinal		Final	
Athlete	Event	Result	Rank	Result	Rank	Result	Rank
Musa Amer	3000 m steeplechase	8:23.94	1 Q	—		8:07.18	4
Ahmed Jumaa Jaber	Marathon	—				2:20:27	38
Khamis Abdullah Saifeldin	3000 m steeplechase	8:17.89	1 Q	—		8:36.66	15
Abdulrahman Suleiman	1500 m	3:42.00	11	Did not advance			
Majed Saeed Sultan	800 m	1:47.92	4	Did not advance			
Sultan Khamis Zaman	5000 m	13:26.52	9	—		Did not advance	

Field events

Athlete	Event	Qualification		Final	
Athlete	Event	Distance	Position	Distance	Position
Ibrahim Mohamdein Aboubaker	Triple jump	16.71	16	Did not advance	
Abdul Rahman Al-Nubi	Long jump	7.41	37	Did not advance	
Khaled Habash Al-Suwaidi	Shot put	19.04	30	Did not advance	

Combined events – Decathlon

Athlete	Event	100 m	LJ	SP	HJ	400 m	110H	DT	PV	JT	1500 m	Final	Rank
Ahmad Hassan Moussa	Result	10.79	7.04	13.32	1.82	48.73	DNF	DNS	—	—	—	DNF	
Ahmad Hassan Moussa	Points	907	823	687	644	874	0	0	—	—	—	DNF	

== Shooting ==
Two Qatari shooters qualified to compete in the following events:

Men

Athlete	Event	Qualification		Final	
Athlete	Event	Points	Rank	Points	Rank
Rashid Hamad Al-Athba	Double trap	132	11	Did not advance	
Nasser Al-Attiyah	Skeet	122	=3 Q	25 (9)	4

== Swimming ==
Men

Athlete	Event	Heat		Final	
Athlete	Event	Time	Rank	Time	Rank
Anas Abuyousuf	400 m freestyle	4:11.99	43	Did not advance	

== Weightlifting ==
Two Qatari weightlifters (both were born in Bulgaria, but changed their nationality) qualified for the following events:

Athlete	Event	Snatch		Clean & Jerk		Total	Rank
Athlete	Event	Result	Rank	Result	Rank	Total	Rank
Nader Sufyan Abbas	Men's −77 kg	160	=5	195	=7	355	8
Said Saif Asaad	Men's −105 kg	192.5	=2	~~225~~	DNF	192.5	DNF

== See also ==
- Qatar at the 2002 Asian Games
- Qatar at the 2004 Summer Paralympics
