= Qatar at the 1996 Summer Olympics =

- IOC code: QAT
- NOC: Qatar Olympic Committee
- Website: www.olympic.qa/en (in English and Arabic)

in Atlanta
- Competitors: 12 (12 men and 0 women) in 4 sports
- Flag bearer: Ibrahim Ismail Muftah
- Medals: Gold 0 Silver 0 Bronze 0 Total 0

Summer Olympics appearances (overview)
- 1984; 1988; 1992; 1996; 2000; 2004; 2008; 2012; 2016; 2020; 2024

Qatar competed at the 1996 Summer Olympics in Atlanta, United States.

== Results by event ==
=== Athletics ===
Men's 4 × 400 m Relay

- Mubarak Faraj, Ali Doka, Sami al-Abdulla, and Hamad al-Dosari

- Heat — 3:08.25 (→ did not advance)

Men's 400m Hurdles

- Mubarak Faraj

- Heat — 49.27s (→ did not advance)

Men's 800m

- Abdul Rahman Al-Abdullah

- Heat — 1:48.52s (→ did not advance)

Men's 3,000 metres Steeplechase

- Jamal Abdi Hassan

- Heat — 8:36.99
- Semifinals — 8:36.40 (→ did not advance)
