= Qatar at the 1984 Summer Olympics =

- IOC code: QAT
- NOC: Qatar Olympic Committee

in Los Angeles
- Competitors: 24 (24 men and 0 women) in 3 sports
- Flag bearer: Waheed Khamis Al-Salem
- Medals: Gold 0 Silver 0 Bronze 0 Total 0

Summer Olympics appearances (overview)
- 1984; 1988; 1992; 1996; 2000; 2004; 2008; 2012; 2016; 2020; 2024

Qatar participated in the Olympic Games for the first time at the 1984 Summer Olympics in Los Angeles, United States.

== Results by event ==
=== Athletics ===
Men's Decathlon

- Manzour Salah

- Final Result — 6589 points (→ 21st place)

=== Football (soccer) ===
Men's Team Competition:

- Preliminary Round (Group A)

- Qatar – France 2 – 2
- Qatar – Chile 0 – 1
- Qatar – Norway 0 – 2

- Quarter Finals

- → Did not advance

- Team Roster:

- ( 1.) Younis Lari
- ( 2.) Mohddeham Alsowaida
- ( 3.) Sultan Waleed
- ( 4.) Yousuf Aladsani
- ( 5.) Mobarak Alali
- ( 6.) Faraj Almass
- ( 7.) Mubarak Suwaide
- ( 8.) Mohammad Alammari
- ( 9.) Ahmad Almajed
- (10.) Mubarak Alkhater
- (11.) Salem Mehaizaa
- (12.) Ali Alsadah
- (13.) Adel Malalla
- (14.) Ibrahim Ahmad
- (15.) Mansoor Bakheet
- (16.) Khalid Almohanedi
- (17.) Issa Almohamadi
