= Qatar at the 2013 World Aquatics Championships =

- Flag of Qatar
- FINA code: QAT
- National federation: Qatar Swimming Association
- Website: www.qatarswimming.com

in Barcelona, Spain
- Competitors: 3 in 1 sports
- Medals: Gold 0 Silver 0 Bronze 0 Total 0

World Aquatics Championships appearances
- 1973; 1975; 1978; 1982; 1986; 1991; 1994; 1998; 2001; 2003; 2005; 2007; 2009; 2011; 2013; 2015; 2017; 2019; 2022; 2023; 2024

Qatar competed at the 2013 World Aquatics Championships in Barcelona, Spain between 19 July and 4 August 2013.

== Swimming ==
Qatari swimmers achieved qualifying standards in the following events (up to a maximum of 2 swimmers in each event at the A-standard entry time, and 1 at the B-standard):

Men

Athlete	Event	Heat		Semifinal		Final	
Athlete	Event	Time	Rank	Time	Rank	Time	Rank
Abdulrahman Al-Ishaq	100 m freestyle	DNS		did not advance			
Noah Al-Khulaifi	200 m freestyle	2:06.62	65	did not advance			
Omar Omar	50 m butterfly	27.10	67	did not advance			
