= Qatar at the 1992 Summer Olympics =

- IOC code: QAT
- NOC: Qatar Olympic Committee

in Barcelona
- Competitors: 28 (28 men and 0 women) in 2 sports
- Medals Ranked 54th: Gold 0 Silver 0 Bronze 1 Total 1

Summer Olympics appearances (overview)
- 1984; 1988; 1992; 1996; 2000; 2004; 2008; 2012; 2016; 2020; 2024

Qatar competed at the 1992 Summer Olympics in Barcelona, Spain. The nation won its first Olympic medal at these Games.

== Medalists ==
Medal	Name	Sport	Event	Date
Bronze	Mohammed Suleiman	Athletics	Men's 1500 metres	8 August

== Competitors ==
The following is the list of number of competitors in the Games.

Sport	Men	Women	Total
Athletics	11	0	11
Football	17	–	17
Total	28	0	28

== Results by event ==
=== Athletics ===
Men's 4 × 400 m Relay

- Sami Jumah, Masoud Khamis, Ibrahim Ismail Muftah, and Fareh Ibrahim Ali

- Heat — 3:07.26 (→ did not advance)

Men's Long Jump

- Abdullah Mohamed Al-Sheib

- Qualification — 7.27 m (→ did not advance)

Men's Shot Put

- Bilal Saad Mubarak

- Qualification — 17.01 m (→ did not advance)
