= Qatar at the Olympics =

- IOC code: QAT
- NOC: Qatar Olympic Committee
- Website: www.olympic.qa/en (in English and Arabic)
- Medals Ranked 94th: Gold 2 Silver 2 Bronze 5 Total 9

Summer appearances
- 1984; 1988; 1992; 1996; 2000; 2004; 2008; 2012; 2016; 2020; 2024; 2028

Qatar has competed in 11 Summer Olympic Games. The nation has never competed in the Winter Olympic Games. Their first ever Olympic gold medal was won by Fares El-Bakh in weightlifting at the 2020 Summer Olympics, followed by a gold medal for Mutaz Essa Barshim in men's high jump. They have also won two silver and four bronze medals.

Following the 2008 Summer Olympics, Qatar was, along with Saudi Arabia and Brunei, one of only three countries never to have sent a female athlete to the Olympic Games. The International Olympic Committee in 2010 announced it would "press" these countries to allow and facilitate women's participation, and shortly thereafter the Qatar Olympic Committee announced that it "hoped to send up to four female athletes in shooting and fencing" to the 2012 London Summer Olympics. The country ultimately included four female athletes in its delegation.

The Qatar Olympic Committee was formed in 1979 and recognized by the IOC in 1980.

== Medal tables ==
=== Medals by Summer Games ===
Games	Athletes	Gold	Silver	Bronze	Total	Rank
1984 Los Angeles	24	0	0	0	0	–
1988 Seoul	10	0	0	0	0	–
1992 Barcelona	28	0	0	1	1	54
1996 Atlanta	12	0	0	0	0	–
2000 Sydney	17	0	0	1	1	71
2004 Athens	15	0	0	0	0	–
2008 Beijing	22	0	0	0	0	–
2012 London	12	0	1	1	2	75
2016 Rio de Janeiro	38	0	1	0	1	69
2020 Tokyo	16	2	0	1	3	41
2024 Paris	14	0	0	1	1	84
2028 Los Angeles	future event					
2032 Brisbane	future event					
Total		2	2	5	9	94

=== Medals by sport ===
Sport	Gold	Silver	Bronze	Total
Athletics	1	2	2	5
Weightlifting	1	0	1	2
Beach volleyball	0	0	1	1
Shooting	0	0	1	1
Totals (4 entries)	2	2	5	9

== Athletes with most medals ==
Only one Qatari athlete has won multiple medals in the history of the Olympic Games: he is track and field in the high jump Mutaz Essa Barshim.

Athlete	Sport	Games	Gold medal	Silver medal	Bronze medal	Total
Mutaz Essa Barshim	Athletics	2012–2024	1	2	1	4

Notes: in Khaki the athletes still in activity.

== List of medalists ==
Medal	Name	Games	Sport	Event
Bronze	Mohammed Suleiman	1992 Barcelona	Athletics	Men's 1500 metres
Bronze	Said Saif Asaad	2000 Sydney	Weightlifting	Men's 105 kg
Bronze	Nasser Al-Attiyah	2012 London	Shooting	Men's skeet
Silver	Mutaz Essa Barshim	2012 London	Athletics	Men's high jump
Silver	Mutaz Essa Barshim	2016 Rio de Janeiro	Athletics	Men's high jump
Gold	Mutaz Essa Barshim	2020 Tokyo	Athletics	Men's high jump
Gold	Fares Ibrahim	2020 Tokyo	Weightlifting	Men's 96 kg
Bronze	Ahmed Tijan and Cherif Younousse	2020 Tokyo	Beach volleyball	Men's tournament
Bronze	Mutaz Essa Barshim	2024 Paris	Athletics	Men's high jump

== See also ==
- List of flag bearers for Qatar at the Olympics
- Qatar at the Paralympics
