= Qatar at the 2016 Summer Olympics =

- IOC code: QAT
- NOC: Qatar Olympic Committee
- Website: www.olympic.qa/en (in English and Arabic)

in Rio de Janeiro
- Competitors: 38 in 10 sports
- Flag bearer: Sheikh Ali Al-Thani
- Medals Ranked 69th: Gold 0 Silver 1 Bronze 0 Total 1

Summer Olympics appearances (overview)
- 1984; 1988; 1992; 1996; 2000; 2004; 2008; 2012; 2016; 2020; 2024

Qatar competed at the 2016 Summer Olympics in Rio de Janeiro, Brazil, from 5 to 21 August 2016. This was the nation's ninth consecutive appearance at the Summer Olympics.

The Qatar Olympic Committee (QOC) sent the nation's largest ever delegation to the Games. A total of 38 athletes, 36 men and 2 women, were selected to the Qatari team across ten different sports, roughly more than a triple of its full roster size at London 2012. Twenty-three of them were born outside Qatar, including eleven handball players, two boxers, a table tennis player, and a beach volleyballer. In addition to three aforementioned sports, Qatar marked its Olympic debut in equestrian jumping and judo, as well as its return to weightlifting after 12 years.

The Qatari team was highlighted by two of its prominent athletes and Olympic bronze medalists from the previous Games: high jumper and current Asian record holder Mutaz Essa Barshim, and skeet shooter Nasser Al-Attiyah, who attended his sixth Games as the oldest and most experienced competitor (aged 45). Other notable athletes on the Qatari delegation also included Asia's fastest sprinter Femi Ogunode, table tennis legend Li Ping, freestyle swimmer Nada Arkaji, and equestrian rider Sheikh Ali Al-Thani, who eventually served as the nation's flag bearer in the opening ceremony.

Qatar left Rio de Janeiro with a historic silver-medal feat by Barshim, upgrading his bronze from London four years earlier. Meanwhile, Al-Thani and hammer thrower Ashraf Amgad Elseify narrowly missed out of the podium to join with Barshim on the nation's medal tally, finishing among the top six in their respective sporting events.

== Medalists ==
Medal	Name	Sport	Event	Date
Silver	Mutaz Essa Barshim	Athletics	Men's high jump	16 August

Medals by sport
Sport	1st place, gold medalist(s)	2nd place, silver medalist(s)	3rd place, bronze medalist(s)	Total
Athletics	0	1	0	1
Total	0	1	0	1

Medals by date
Date	1st place, gold medalist(s)	2nd place, silver medalist(s)	3rd place, bronze medalist(s)	Total
16 August	0	1	0	0
Total	0	1	0	1

== Athletics ==
Qatari athletes have so far achieved qualifying standards in the following athletics events (up to a maximum of 3 athletes in each event):

Key

- Note–Ranks given for track events are within the athlete's heat only
- Q = Qualified for the next round
- q = Qualified for the next round as a fastest loser or, in field events, by position without achieving the qualifying target
- NR = National record
- N/A = Round not applicable for the event
- Bye = Athlete not required to compete in round

Track & road events

Athlete	Event	Heat		Quarterfinal		Semifinal		Final	
Athlete	Event	Result	Rank	Result	Rank	Result	Rank	Result	Rank
Femi Ogunode	Men's 100 m	Bye		10.28	5	Did not advance			
Femi Ogunode	Men's 200 m	20.36	4	—N/a		Did not advance			
Abdelalelah Haroun	Men's 400 m	45.76	2 Q	—N/a		46.66	7	Did not advance	
Abubaker Haydar Abdalla	Men's 800 m	1:47.81	5	—N/a		Did not advance			
Abdulrahman Musaeb Balla	Men's 800 m	DNS		—N/a		Did not advance			
Dalal Mesfer Al-Harith	Women's 400 m	1:07.12	7	—N/a		Did not advance			

Field events

Athlete	Event	Qualification		Final	
Athlete	Event	Distance	Position	Distance	Position
Mutaz Essa Barshim	Men's high jump	2.29	=1 Q	2.36	2nd place, silver medalist(s)
Ahmed Bader Magour	Men's javelin throw	77.19	16	Did not advance	
Ashraf Amgad Elseify	Men's hammer throw	73.47	12 q	75.46	6

== Boxing ==
Qatar has entered two boxers to compete in each of the following weight classes into the Olympic boxing tournament, signifying the nation's debut in the sport. Turkish-born Hakan Erşeker had claimed his Olympic place as a quarterfinalist losing to the eventual champion Enrico Lacruz of the Netherlands at the 2016 AIBA World Qualifying Tournament in Baku, Azerbaijan. Meanwhile, light welterweight boxer Thulasi Tharumalingam secured an additional place on the Qatari roster with his semifinal triumph at the 2016 APB and WSB Olympic Qualifier in Vargas, Venezuela.

Athlete	Event	Round of 32	Round of 16	Quarterfinals	Semifinals	Final	
Athlete	Event	Opposition Result	Opposition Result	Opposition Result	Opposition Result	Opposition Result	Rank
Hakan Erşeker	Men's lightweight	Tojibaev (UZB); L 0–3	Did not advance				
Thulasi Tharumalingam	Men's light welterweight	Baatarsükh (MGL); L 0–3	Did not advance				

== Equestrian ==
Qatar has entered a team of four jumping riders into the Olympic equestrian competition with a first-place finish at the 2015 FEI Nations Cup Series in Abu Dhabi, United Arab Emirates, signifying the nation's debut in the sport.

=== Jumping ===
Athlete	Horse	Event	Qualification								Final					Total	
Athlete	Horse	Event	Round 1		Round 2			Round 3			Round A		Round B			Total	
Athlete	Horse	Event	Penalties	Rank	Penalties	Total	Rank	Penalties	Total	Rank	Penalties	Rank	Penalties	Total	Rank	Penalties	Rank
Hamad Al-Attiyah	Appagino	Individual	8	=53 Q	5	13	50 Q	DNS			Did not advance						
Ali Al-Rumaihi	Gunder	Individual	1	=25 Q	1	2	14 Q	2	4	=7 Q	4	=16 Q	1	5	=16	5	=16
Sheikh Ali Al-Thani	First Division	Individual	0	=1 Q	4	4	=15 Q	1	5	=13 Q	0	=1 Q	0	0	=1 JO	8	6
Bassem Hassan Mohammed	Dejavu	Individual	4	=27 Q	4	8	=30 Q	5	13	33 Q	8	=28	Did not advance			8	=28
Hamad Al-Attiyah; Ali Al-Rumaihi; Sheikh Ali Al-Thani; Bassem Hassan Mohammed	See above	Team	5	7	9	—N/a	9	Did not advance			—N/a					9	9

"#" indicates that the score of this rider does not count in the team competition, since only the best three results of a team are counted.

== Handball ==
Summary

Key:

- ET – After extra time
- P – Match decided by penalty-shootout.

Team	Event	Group Stage						Quarterfinal	Semifinal	Final / BM	
Team	Event	Opposition Score	Opposition Score	Opposition Score	Opposition Score	Opposition Score	Rank	Opposition Score	Opposition Score	Opposition Score	Rank
Qatar men's	Men's tournament	Croatia; W 30–23	France; L 20–35	Tunisia; D 25–25	Denmark; L 25–26	Argentina; W 22–18	4	Germany; L 22–34	Did not advance		8

=== Men's tournament ===
Qatar men's handball team qualified for the Olympics by winning the title and securing a lone outright berth at the 2015 Asian Qualification Tournament in Doha, signifying the nation's debut in the sport.

Team roster

The following is the Qatari roster in the men's handball tournament of the 2016 Summer Olympics.

Head coach: (Spain) Valero Rivera López

No.	Pos.	Name	Date of birth (age)	Height	App.	Goals	Club
1	RB	Žarko Marković	1 June 1986 (aged 30)	1.96 m	22	152	(Qatar) El Jaish
4	LB	Hassan Mabrouk	29 July 1982 (aged 34)	1.90 m	30	64	(Qatar) El Jaish
5	LB	Marko Bagarić	31 December 1985 (aged 30)	2.01 m			(Qatar) Al Rayyan
6	RB	Mustafa Alsaltialkrad	16 March 1987 (aged 29)	1.86 m
7	LB	Bertrand Roiné	17 February 1981 (aged 35)	1.98 m	40	70	(Qatar) Al Ahli
9	LB	Rafael Capote	5 October 1987 (aged 28)	1.96 m	34	131	(Qatar) El Jaish
11	LW	Abdulrazzaq Murad	29 June 1990 (aged 26)	1.86 m	77	169	(Qatar) Al-Gharafa
12	GK	Danijel Šarić	27 June 1977 (aged 39)	1.95 m	22	0	(Spain) Barcelona
13	RW	Eldar Memišević	21 June 1992 (aged 24)	1.78 m	100	196	(Qatar) El Jaish
14	P	Bassel Al-Rayes	4 March 1979 (aged 37)	1.80 m	36	146	(Qatar) Al Rayyan
15	RW	Nasreddine Megdich	29 August 1991 (aged 24)	1.78 m	16	27	(Qatar) Al Rayyan
16	GK	Goran Stojanović	24 February 1977 (aged 39)	1.91 m	37	0	(Qatar) El Jaish
19	P	Borja Vidal	25 December 1981 (aged 34)	2.06 m	34	79	(Qatar) Al-Qiyada
25	CB	Kamalaldin Mallash	1 January 1992 (aged 24)	1.80 m	62	109	(Qatar) El Jaish
94	LB	Ameen Zakkar	15 June 1994 (aged 22)	1.95 m	35	62	(Qatar) Al Rayyan

Group play

Pos	Team	Pld	W	D	L	GF	GA	GD	Pts	Qualification
1	Croatia	5	4	0	1	147	134	+13	8 (Note: Croatia 29–28 France)	Quarter-finals
2	France	5	4	0	1	152	126	+26	8	Quarter-finals
3	Denmark	5	3	0	2	136	127	+9	6	Quarter-finals
4	Qatar	5	2	1	2	122	127	−5	5	Quarter-finals
5	Argentina	5	1	0	4	110	126	−16	2	
6	Tunisia	5	0	1	4	118	145	−27	1	

Source: IHF
Rules for classification: 1) Points; 2) Head-to-head points; 3) Head-to-head goal difference; 4) Head-to-head goals scored; 5) Goal difference; 6) Goals scored; 7) Draw.
Notes:

7 August 2016; 09:30	Croatia	23–30	Qatar	Future Arena, Rio de Janeiro; Referees: López, Ramírez (ESP)
7 August 2016; 09:30	Štrlek 5	(8–15)	Marković 10	Future Arena, Rio de Janeiro; Referees: López, Ramírez (ESP)
7 August 2016; 09:30	3× (yellow card) 5× (suspension)	Report	1× (yellow card) 6× (suspension)	Future Arena, Rio de Janeiro; Referees: López, Ramírez (ESP)

9 August 2016; 09:30	Qatar	20–35	France	Future Arena, Rio de Janeiro; Referees: Horáček, Novotný (CZE)
9 August 2016; 09:30	three players 4	(13–16)	Abalo 7	Future Arena, Rio de Janeiro; Referees: Horáček, Novotný (CZE)
9 August 2016; 09:30	2× (yellow card) 4× (suspension)	Report	3× (yellow card) 3× (suspension)	Future Arena, Rio de Janeiro; Referees: Horáček, Novotný (CZE)

11 August 2016; 09:30	Tunisia	25–25	Qatar	Future Arena, Rio de Janeiro; Referees: Gjeding, Hansen (DEN)
11 August 2016; 09:30	Boughanmi 8	(12–11)	Capote 12	Future Arena, Rio de Janeiro; Referees: Gjeding, Hansen (DEN)
11 August 2016; 09:30	2× (yellow card) 6× (suspension)	Report	2× (yellow card) 5× (suspension)	Future Arena, Rio de Janeiro; Referees: Gjeding, Hansen (DEN)

13 August 2016; 14:40	Denmark	26–25	Qatar	Future Arena, Rio de Janeiro; Referees: Rashed, El-Sayed (EGY)
13 August 2016; 14:40	Svan 7	(14–14)	Markovic 7	Future Arena, Rio de Janeiro; Referees: Rashed, El-Sayed (EGY)
13 August 2016; 14:40	4× (yellow card) 5× (suspension)	Report	3× (yellow card) 3× (suspension)	Future Arena, Rio de Janeiro; Referees: Rashed, El-Sayed (EGY)

15 August 2016; 21:50	Qatar	22–18	Argentina	Future Arena, Rio de Janeiro; Referees: López, Ramírez (ESP)
15 August 2016; 21:50	Capote, Memišević 4	(12–9)	Simonet 5	Future Arena, Rio de Janeiro; Referees: López, Ramírez (ESP)
15 August 2016; 21:50	3× (yellow card) 4× (suspension)	Report	4× (yellow card) 4× (suspension)	Future Arena, Rio de Janeiro; Referees: López, Ramírez (ESP)

Quarterfinal

17 August 2016; 13:30	Germany	34–22	Qatar	Future Arena, Rio de Janeiro; Referees: Lah, Sok (SLO)
17 August 2016; 13:30	three players 5	(16–12)	Capote 9	Future Arena, Rio de Janeiro; Referees: Lah, Sok (SLO)
17 August 2016; 13:30	3× (yellow card) 5× (suspension)	Report	3× (yellow card) 1× (suspension)	Future Arena, Rio de Janeiro; Referees: Lah, Sok (SLO)

== Judo ==
Qatar has qualified one judoka for the men's lightweight category (73 kg) at the Games, signifying the nation's debut in the sport. Morad Zemouri earned a continental quota spot from the Asian region, as Qatar's top-ranked judoka outside a direct qualifying position in the IJF World Ranking List of May 30, 2016.

Athlete	Event	Round of 64	Round of 32	Round of 16	Quarterfinals	Semifinals	Repechage	Final / BM	
Athlete	Event	Opposition Result	Opposition Result	Opposition Result	Opposition Result	Opposition Result	Opposition Result	Opposition Result	Rank
Morad Zemouri	Men's−73 kg	Bye	van Tichelt (BEL); L 000–100	Did not advance					

== Shooting ==
Qatari shooters have achieved quota places for the following events by virtue of their best finishes at the 2015 ISSF World Cup series, and Asian Championships, as long as they obtained a minimum qualifying score (MQS) as of March 31, 2016.

Athlete	Event	Qualification		Semifinal		Final	
Athlete	Event	Points	Rank	Points	Rank	Points	Rank
Nasser Al-Attiyah	Men's skeet	111	31	Did not advance			
Rashid Saleh Hamad	Men's skeet	109	32	Did not advance			

== Swimming ==
Qatar has received a Universality invitation from FINA to send two swimmers (one male and one female) to the Olympics.

Athlete	Event	Heat		Semifinal		Final	
Athlete	Event	Time	Rank	Time	Rank	Time	Rank
Noah Al-Khulaifi	Men's 100 m backstroke	1:07.47	39	Did not advance			
Nada Arkaji	Women's 100 m butterfly	1:18.86	45	Did not advance			

== Table tennis ==
Qatar has entered one athlete into the table tennis competition at the Games. Chinese import Li Ping secured the Olympic spot in the men's singles as the highest-ranked table tennis player coming from the West Asia zone at the Asian Qualification Tournament in Hong Kong.

Athlete	Event	Preliminary	Round 1	Round 2	Round 3	Round of 16	Quarterfinals	Semifinals	Final / BM	
Athlete	Event	Opposition Result	Opposition Result	Opposition Result	Opposition Result	Opposition Result	Opposition Result	Opposition Result	Opposition Result	Rank
Li Ping	Men's singles	Bye		Pattantyús (HUN); W 4–0	Ovtcharov (GER); L 3–4	Did not advance				

== Volleyball ==
=== Beach ===
Qatar men's beach volleyball team qualified directly for the Olympics by winning the final match over China at the AVC Continental Cup in Cairns, Australia, signifying the nation's debut in the sport.

Athlete	Event	Preliminary round	Standing	Round of 16	Quarterfinals	Semifinals	Final / BM	
Athlete	Event	Opposition Score	Standing	Opposition Score	Opposition Score	Opposition Score	Opposition Score	Rank
Jefferson Pereira; Cherif Younousse	Men's	Pool F Gibb – Patterson (USA); L 0 – 2 (16–21, 16–21); Gavira – Herrera (ESP); W 2 – 1 (13–21, 21–18, 15–12); Huber – Seidl (AUT); W 2 – 1 (18–21, 21–19, 15–12)	2 Q	Krasilnikov – Semenov (RUS); L 0 – 2 (13–21, 13–21)	Did not advance			

== Weightlifting ==
Qatar has received an unused quota place from IWF to send a male weightlifter to the Olympics, signifying the nation's comeback to the sport for the first time since 2004.

Athlete	Event	Snatch		Clean & Jerk		Total	Rank
Athlete	Event	Result	Rank	Result	Rank	Total	Rank
Faris Ibrahim	Men's −85 kg	158	=10	203	7	361	8
