= Qatar at the 2008 Summer Olympics =

- IOC code: QAT
- NOC: Qatar Olympic Committee
- Website: www.olympic.qa/en (in English and Arabic)

in Beijing
- Competitors: 22 in 7 sports
- Flag bearer: Nasser Al-Attiyah
- Medals: Gold 0 Silver 0 Bronze 0 Total 0

Summer Olympics appearances (overview)
- 1984; 1988; 1992; 1996; 2000; 2004; 2008; 2012; 2016; 2020; 2024; 2028

Qatar competed at the 2008 Summer Olympics in Beijing, China. The country sent its largest ever Olympic delegation to Beijing, with 22 athletes competing in seven sports: athletics, swimming, shooting, weightlifting, fencing, archery and taekwondo.

Qatar is one of at least three countries that sent an all-male delegation to the Beijing Games.

== Archery ==
Athlete	Event	Ranking round		Round of 64	Round of 32	Round of 16	Quarterfinals	Semifinals	Final / BM	
Athlete	Event	Score	Seed	Opposition Score	Opposition Score	Opposition Score	Opposition Score	Opposition Score	Opposition Score	Rank
Ali Ahmed Salem	Men's individual	627	57	Im D-H (KOR); L 103–108	Did not advance					

== Athletics ==
Key

- Note–Ranks given for track events are within the athlete's heat only
- Q = Qualified for the next round
- q = Qualified for the next round as a fastest loser or, in field events, by position without achieving the qualifying target
- NR = National record
- N/A = Round not applicable for the event
- Bye = Athlete not required to compete in round

Men
Track & road events

Athlete	Event	Heat		Quarterfinal		Semifinal		Final	
Athlete	Event	Result	Rank	Result	Rank	Result	Rank	Result	Rank
Ahmad Hassan Abdullah	10000 m	—N/a						27:23.75	8
Mohamed Issa Al-Thawadi	110 m hurdles	13.64	5 q	DSQ		Did not advance			
Thamer Kamal Ali	1500 m	3:41.08	8	—N/a		Did not advance			
Daham Najim Bashir	1500 m	3:36.05	3 Q	—N/a		3:37.77	7 q	3:37.68	10
Samuel Francis	100 m	10.40	1 Q	10.11	4 q	10.20	DSQ	Did not advance	
Samuel Francis	200 m	DNS	DSQ	Did not advance					
Abubaker Ali Kamal	3000 m steeplechase	8:21.85	4 Q	—N/a				8:16.59	8
Felix Kibore	10000 m	—N/a						28:11.92	22
James Kwalia	5000 m	13:39.96	2 Q	—N/a				13:23.48	8
Yousuf Othman Qader	Marathon	—N/a						2:28:40	64
Essa Ismail Rashed	10000 m	—N/a						27:58.67	20
Mubarak Shami	Marathon	—N/a						DNF	
Sultan Khamis Zaman	5000 m	13:53.38	12	—N/a				Did not advance	

Field events

Athlete	Event	Qualification		Final	
Athlete	Event	Distance	Position	Distance	Position
Ibrahim Aboubaker	Triple jump	16.03	31	Did not advance	
Rashid Shafi Al-Dosari	Discus throw	63.83	9 q	62.55	10

== Fencing ==
Men

Athlete	Event	Round of 32	Round of 16	Quarterfinal	Semifinal	Final / BM	
Athlete	Event	Opposition Score	Opposition Score	Opposition Score	Opposition Score	Opposition Score	Rank
Khalid Al-Hamadi	Individual foil	Choi B-C (KOR); L 3–15	Did not advance				

== Shooting ==
Men

Athlete	Event	Qualification		Final	
Athlete	Event	Points	Rank	Points	Rank
Nasser Al-Attiyah	Skeet	117	15	Did not advance	
Rashid Hamad	Skeet	106	37	Did not advance	

== Swimming ==
Men

Athlete	Event	Heat		Semifinal		Final	
Athlete	Event	Time	Rank	Time	Rank	Time	Rank
Osama Mohammed Ye Alarag	100 m breaststroke	1:10.83	61	Did not advance			

== Taekwondo ==
Athlete	Event	Round of 16	Quarterfinals	Semifinals	Repechage	Bronze Medal	Final	
Athlete	Event	Opposition Result	Opposition Result	Opposition Result	Opposition Result	Opposition Result	Opposition Result	Rank
Abdulqader Hikmat Sarhan	Men's −80 kg	Ahmadov (AZE); L 0–5	Did not advance					
