= Qatar Athletics Federation =

Governing body for athletics in Qatar

The Qatar Athletics Federation (Arabic: الاتحاد القطري لألعاب القوى) is the governing body for the sport of athletics in Qatar. It is a member of the Arab Athletics Federation, Asian Athletics Association and World Athletics. The president of the body is Dr. Thani bin Abdulrahman Al Kuwari.

The Federation is currently based at the Al Hodaifi Tower in Doha, the same location as the Qatar Olympic Committee.
