= Qatar at the 1988 Summer Olympics =

- IOC code: QAT
- NOC: Qatar Olympic Committee

in Seoul
- Competitors: 10 (10 men and 0 women) in 3 sports
- Medals: Gold 0 Silver 0 Bronze 0 Total 0

Summer Olympics appearances (overview)
- 1984; 1988; 1992; 1996; 2000; 2004; 2008; 2012; 2016; 2020; 2024

Qatar competed at the 1988 Summer Olympics in Seoul, South Korea.

== Competitors ==
The following is the list of number of competitors in the Games.

Sport	Men	Women	Total
Athletics	8	0	8
Sailing	1	0	1
Shooting	1	0	1
Total	10	0	10

== Results by event ==
=== Athletics ===
Men's 10,000 metres

- Ahmed Ebrahim Warsama

- Heat – 29:37.99 (→ did not advance)
