= Yacob Al-Khulaifi =

Qatari swimmer (born 2001)

Personal information
- Born: 28 May 2001 (age 25)

Sport
- Sport: Swimming

Yacob Al-Khulaifi (born 28 May 2001) is a Qatari swimmer. He represented Qatar at the World Aquatics Championships both in 2017 and in 2019.

He competed in two events at the 2017 World Aquatics Championships in Budapest, Hungary: the men's 100 metre butterfly and the men's 200 metre freestyle events.

In 2018, he represented Qatar at the 2018 Asian Games held in Jakarta, Indonesia. In the same year, he also competed in the boys' 100 metre butterfly event at the 2018 Summer Youth Olympics held in Buenos Aires, Argentina. In 2019, he represented Qatar at the 2019 World Aquatics Championships in Gwangju, South Korea. He competed in the men's 100 metre butterfly and men's 200 metre freestyle events.
