= Mariam Mamdouh Farid =

Qatari athlete (born 1998)

Mariam Mamdouh Farid (born 1 February 1998) is a Qatari athlete. She represented her country at the 17th World Athletics Championship held in Doha in 2019, where she ran in the Women's 400 metres hurdles. She came last in her heat with a time of 1m 09.49s, her then personal best, and achieved international recognition because she and another woman were the first female Qatari athletes to take part in the world championships. She wore a full body black unitard under her team singlet. She had previously competed in the 200m in the junior world championships held in Bydgoszcz, Poland in 2016, with a time of 30.25s in her heat.

At the time of the 2019 event she was studying communications at the Doha campus of the American Northwestern University.

She said after the 2019 event:

My goal is inspiring the younger generation, breaking down barriers, making people’s perception of how women are in the Middle East,” she said. We are not oppressed. I can still compete with my scarf on. If there is something I want to do, I will do it.
