= Sami Al-Abdullah =

Qatari sprinter

Personal information
- Nationality: Qatari
- Born: 8 January 1967 (age 58)

Sport
- Sport: Sprinting
- Event: 4 × 400 metres relay

Sami Suleiman Soroor Al-Abdullah (Arabic: سامي سليمان سرور العبدالله, born 8 January 1967), also known as Sami Jumah, is a Qatari sprinter. He competed in the 4 × 400 metres relay at the 1992 Summer Olympics and the 1996 Summer Olympics.
