= Bashair Obaid Al-Manwari =

Qatari sprinter

Personal information
- Nationality: Qatari
- Born: 13 March 1997 (age 28)

Sport
- Sport: Athletics
- Event: 100 metres

Bashair Obaid Al-Manwari (Arabic: بشاير عبيد المنوري, born 13 March 1997) is a Qatari athlete. She competed in the women's 100 metres event at the 2020 Summer Olympics.
