= Waheed Khamis Al-Salem =

Qatari sprinter

Personal information
- Nationality: Qatari
- Born: 1960 (age 65–66)

Sport
- Sport: Sprinting
- Event: 4 × 100 metres relay

Waheed Khamis Al-Salem (born 1960) is a Qatari sprinter. He competed in the men's 4 × 100 metres relay at the 1984 Summer Olympics.
