= Noor Al-Malki =

Qatari sprinter

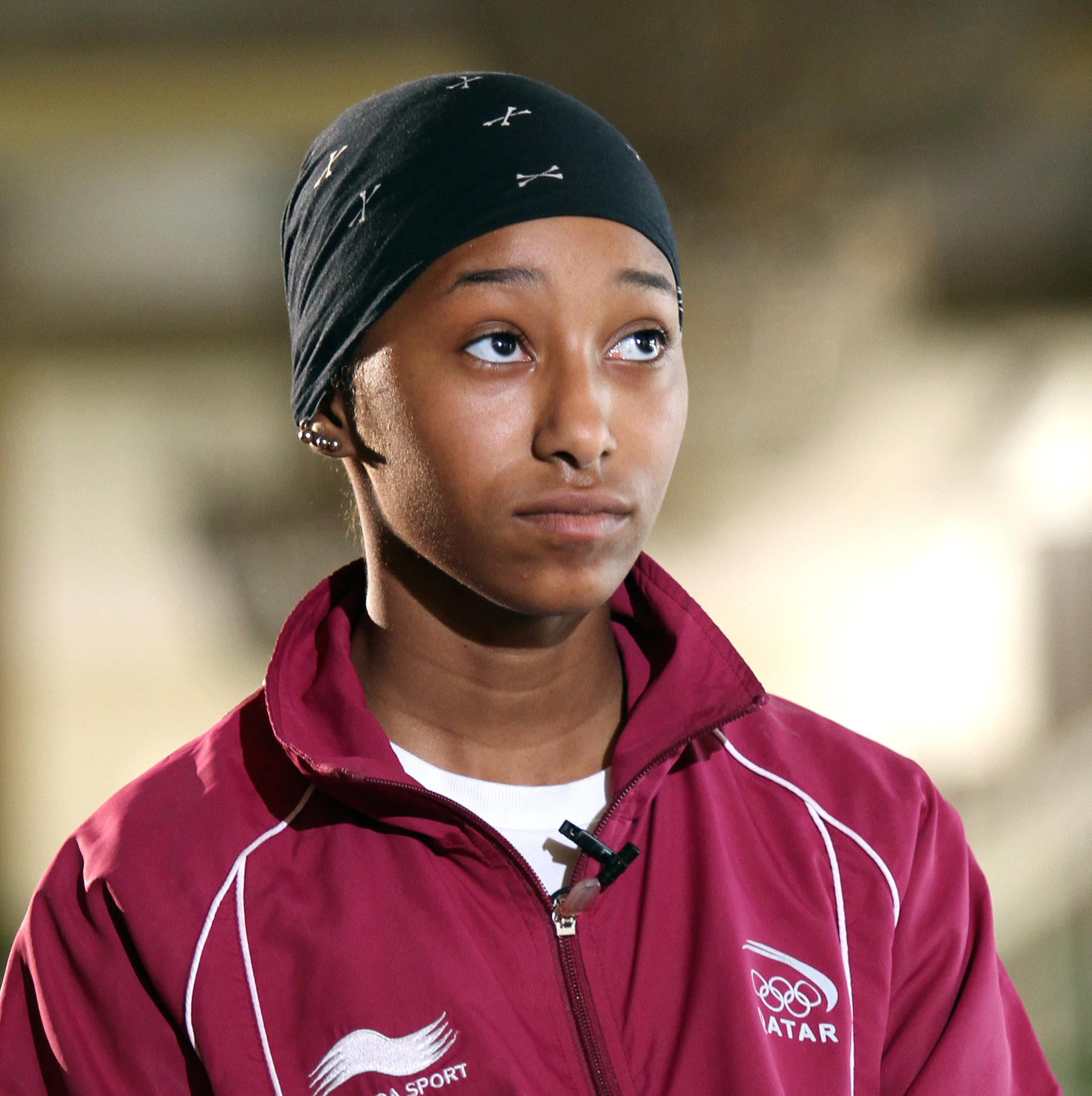
- Noor Hussain Al-Malki in 2012

Personal information
- Born: 21 October 1994 (age 31) Doha, Qatar
- Height: 155 cm (5 ft 1 in)
- Weight: 43 kg (95 lb)

Sport
- Sport: Athletics
- Event: Sprint

Achievements and titles
- Personal best: 100 m – 12.61 (2012)

Noor Hussain Al-Malki (born 21 October 1994) is an Arab sprinter, and a member of the Qatari Olympic Team at the 2012 Summer Olympics. By competing in London she became one of the first female athletes to represent the country at the Olympic Games.

Malki was born the youngest of six brothers and five sisters. She began training as an athlete in 2008, under the guidance of Tunisian coach and former international middle-distance runner Naima Ben Amara. Although at first she lacked consistency in her training, she soon built a strong relationship with her coach, and became the fastest female Qatari athlete, winning the Qatar Association of Athletics Federation's (QAAF) ‘Best Female Athlete’ in 2010–11. Malki considers fellow Qatari Femi Ogunode to be her sporting idol, and hopes to "become an idol" for other Qatari girls in the future.

At the 2012 Summer Olympics, Malki suffered a pulled hamstring steps out of the starting blocks. Her race ended in sudden pain on the track, eventually taken off in a wheelchair.
