= Shahd Ashraf =

Qatari sprinter (born 2003)

Personal information
- Nationality: Qatar
- Born: September 16, 2003 (age 22) Sudan

Sport
- Sport: Athletics
- Event: 100 metres

Achievements and titles
- Olympic finals: 2024

Shahd Ashraf (born 16 September 2003) is a Sudan-born Qatari sprinter who specialises in the 100 metres.

== Early life ==
Ashraf was born on 16 September 2003 in Sudan.

== Athletic career ==
Ashraf represented Qatar at the 2024 Summer Olympics in Paris. She competed in the women's 100 metres event, where she achieved a time of 12.53 seconds and placed 7th in her preliminary heat.

She was the only Qatari woman to compete in athletics at the 2024 Olympics.

During the opening ceremony, Ashraf served as one of Qatar's flagbearers in the parade of nations, alongside high jumper Mutaz Essa Barshim.
