= Said Saif Asaad =

Qatari weightlifter (born 1979)

Medal record
Representing Qatar
Men's weightlifting
Olympic Games
Bronze medal – third place	2000 Sydney	105 kg
World Championships
Gold medal – first place	2003 Vancouver	105 kg
Asian Games
Gold medal – first place	2002 Busan	105 kg

Said Saif Asaad (born Angel Popov (Bulgarian: Ангел Попов; May 31, 1979 in Bulgaria) is a Qatari weightlifter who competed in the men's 105 kg weight class at the 2000 Summer Olympics and won a bronze medal.

One of eight Bulgarian weightlifters recruited by the Qatar Olympic Committee, Asaad became a Qatari citizen to represent the country in the 2000 Olympics, his old name, Angel Popov, being left behind in the process. Qatar has been known for recruiting sportspeople from other countries, the most notable example being world-class runner Saif Saaeed Shaheen.

After moving to Asia, Asaad has become Asian champion twice as well as winning the 2002 Asian Games. He is also the 2003 world champion. He competed at the 2004 Summer Olympics, but finished without a result.
