= Nada Arakji =

Qatari swimmer

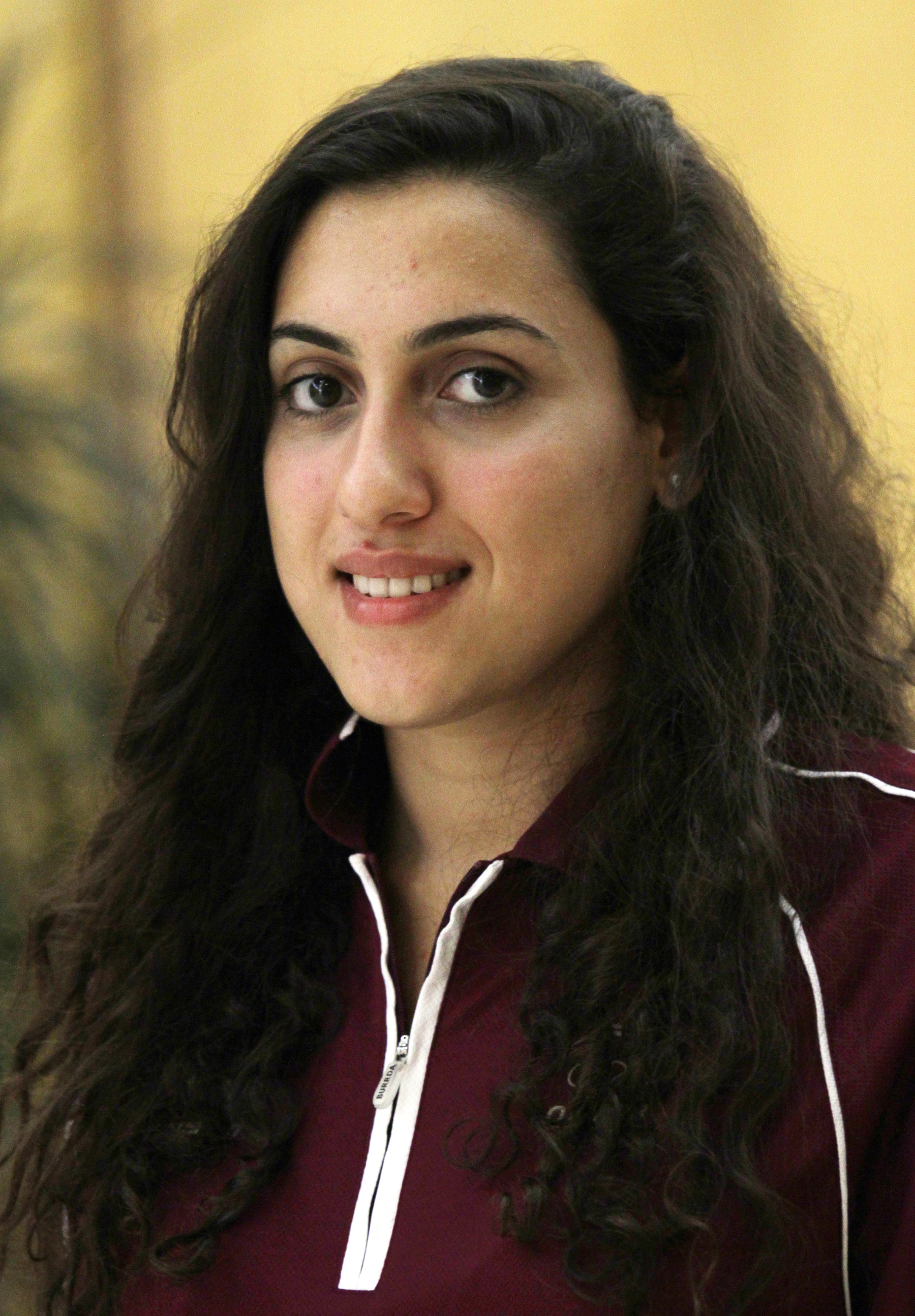
- Arakji in 2012

Personal information
- Born: 30 October 1994 (age 31) Doha, Qatar
- Height: 162 cm (5 ft 4 in)
- Weight: 60 kg (132 lb)

Sport
- Sport: Swimming

Nada Mohamed Wafa Arakji (Arabic: ندى عرقجي, born 30 October 1994) is a Qatari swimmer. She competed in the 50 m freestyle at the 2012 Summer Olympics, becoming the first woman to represent Qatar at the Olympics. She served on the bid committee for Doha's bid to host the 2020 Summer Olympics.

Arakji's family is heavily involved in sports. She is the daughter of the former Qatar national football team goalkeeper and Al Sadd player Mohamed Wafa Arakji. She graduated from Carnegie Mellon University in Qatar in May 2016 with a degree in business administration, serving as her class's student speaker.

She represented Qatar at the 2019 World Aquatics Championships held in Gwangju, South Korea. She competed in the women's 50 metre freestyle and women's 100 metre freestyle events. In both events she did not advance to compete in the semi-finals.

== See also ==
- Qatar at the 2012 Summer Olympics
