= Qatar at the 2011 World Aquatics Championships =

Sporting event delegation

Flag of Qatar

Qatar competed at the 2011 World Aquatics Championships in Shanghai, China between July 16 and 31, 2011.

== Swimming ==
Qatar qualified 2 swimmers.

Men

| Athlete | Event | Heats | | Semifinals | | Final | |
| Athlete | Event | Time | Rank | Time | Rank | Time | Rank |
|---|---|---|---|---|---|---|---|
| Ahmed Atari | Men's 50m Backstroke | 32.37 | 34 | did not advance | | | |
| Ahmed Atari | Men's 400m IM | 5:16.80 | 34 | | | did not advance | |
| Adbulrahman Alishaq | Men's 50m Backstroke | DNS | | did not advance | | | |
| Adbulrahman Alishaq | Men's 400m IM | DNS | | | | did not advance | |
