= Flag of Qatar =

State of Qatar
- Al-Adaam (Arabic: الأدم, romanized: al-Adʻam)
- Use: National flag and ensign
- Proportion: 11:28
- Adopted: 9 July 1971; 55 years ago (Slight adaptation from 1949)
- Design: A white band on the hoist side, separated from a maroon area on the fly side by nine white triangles which act as a serrated line
- Designed by: Abdullah bin Jassim Al Thani

The flag of Qatar (Arabic: عَلَمْ قَطَرْ) is in the ratio of 11:28. It is maroon with a broad white serrated band of nine points at the hoist. It was adopted shortly before the country declared independence from the United Kingdom on 3 September 1971 as a slight color change from an earlier flag adopted from 1949. The triangular edges represent Qatar as the 9th "reconciled emirate". The flag is similar to the flag of Bahrain, which has fewer points, a 3:5 proportion, and a red colour instead of maroon. Qatar's flag is the only national flag having a width more than twice its height.

== History ==
Qatar's historic flag was plain red, in correspondence with the red banner traditionally used by the Kharjite leader Qatari ibn al-Fuja'a. In the 19th century, the country modified its entirely red flag with the addition of a white vertical stripe at the hoist to suit the British directive. After this addition, Sheikh Mohammed bin Thani officially adopted a patterned purple-red and white flag which bore a strong resemblance to its modern derivative. Several additions were made to the Qatari flag in 1932, with the nine-pointed serrated edge, diamonds, and the word "Qatar" being integrated into its design. The maroon colour was standardised in 1936. In the 1960s, Sheikh Ali Al Thani removed the wording and diamonds from the flag. The flag was officially adopted on 9 July 1971 and was virtually identical to the 1960s flag, except the height-to-width proportion.

== Symbolism ==
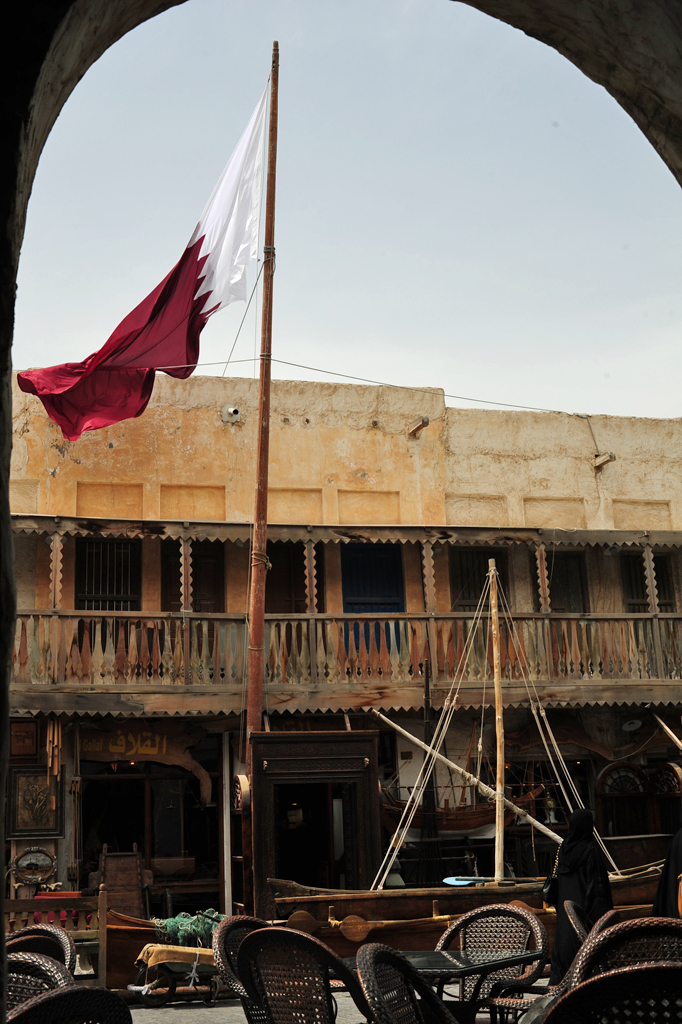
Flag of Qatar flown in Souq Waqif

The nine serrated points represent Qatar’s position as the ninth “reconciled emirate” to sign the 1916 Qatari-British treaty, after Bahrain, Dubai, Abu Dhabi, Ajman, Fujairah, Sharjah, Ras Al Khaimah and Umm Al Quwain. The white signifies peace, while the maroon reflects the nation’s rich heritage in purple dye production—a craft that dates back to the Kassite and Sasanian periods.

In 2012, the Qatari government defined the exact shade of the Qatari flag as Pantone 1955 C, or 'Qatar maroon'. The history of purple dye in the country dates back several centuries. It has been asserted that Qatar was the site of the earliest known production of shellfish dye during the rule of the Kassites due to the presence of a purple dye industry on Al Khor Islands. Qatar was also known for its production of purple dye during the rule of the Sasanian Empire. Mohammed bin Thani, who ruled from 1847 to 1876, proposed the creation of a flag with a purple-red colour in order to unify the state, and to highlight its historic role in the production of dye. In 1932, the British Navy suggested an official flag should be designed. According to the Qatari government, the British proposed that the flag be white and red, but Qatar rejected the red colouring and continued using a mixture of purple and red instead. According to letters from the British political agent in the Persian Gulf to British India, the white cloth was purchased in Bahrain and was originally dyed red locally. The locally purchased dye was of poor quality that faded rapidly, causing the flag to take a chocolate colour after being tinted darker by the hot desert sun. This resulted in the eventual adoption of a maroon colouring in 1936. The white portion of the flag symbolises the peace procured from signing anti-piracy treaties with the British.

Colour scheme	White	Maroon
Pantone	White	1955 C
RAL	9016	3003
CMYK	0-0-0-0	0-85-59-46
HEX	#FFFFFF	#8A1538
RGB	255-255-255	138-21-56

== Construction sheet ==
flag construction sheet

== Historical flags ==
Evolution of the flag of Qatar.

18th century – 1860

1860–1916, 1916–1932

1916

1932–1936

1936–1949

1949–1971

1971–present

== See also ==
- Qatar National Day
- Emblem of Qatar
- Flag of Bahrain
