= Qatar Olympic Committee =

National Olympic Committee

- Country: Qatar
- Code: QAT
- Created: 1979
- Recognized: 1980
- Continental Association: OCA
- Headquarters: Doha, Qatar
- President: Joaan bin Hamad Al Thani
- Secretary General: Jassim Rashid Al Buenain
- Website: olympic.qa

Old logo

The Qatar Olympic Committee (Arabic: اللجنة الأولمبية القطرية; IOC code: QAT) is the National Olympic Committee representing Qatar.

== History ==
The QOC was formed in 1979 and was granted full recognition by the International Olympic Committee in 1980. QOC's main goal is to bring world-class sports events to Qatar, ensure sporting success and encourage people to participate in sports at all levels. The QOC developed many programs, events and initiatives, such as National Sports Day, the Qatar Olympic Academy, the Qatar Women's Sports Committee, the Schools Olympic Program, and the Qatar Athlete Development Pathway. Joaan bin Hamad bin Khalifa Al Thani, the fifth son of the father Emir, became the QOC president in May 2015. During the Asian Games in Doha 2006, he was the ambassador of the Torch relay. In 2015, he was also the president of the Organizing Committee of the 24th Men's Handball World Championship.

== Key programs and initiatives ==
QOC runs several key initiatives aimed at promoting sports culture and community engagement in Qatar. Notably, National Sports Day is an annual event that unites the Qatari community through sports, emphasizing physical fitness and the importance of sports in daily life. Another significant initiative is the Schools Olympic Program, which encourages youth participation in sports and instills Olympic values such as respect, friendship, and excellence among young athletes.

These programs aim to increase public participation in sports and physical activity, building a stronger foundation for the country’s athletic future. They also encourage collaboration between schools, local sports organizations, and community members to foster a healthy and active lifestyle.

== QOC as a soft power tool ==
The Qatar Olympic Committee (QOC) plays a pivotal role in Qatar’s soft power strategy by using sports diplomacy to strengthen international relations, especially within the MENA region and globally. QOC engages with other National Olympic Committees and participates in major international sports conferences, which enhances Qatar's image and influence on the global stage.

Through hosting prestigious international sporting events and supporting collaborative international sports initiatives, QOC helps position Qatar as a hub for global sports diplomacy, fostering partnerships that extend beyond the realm of athletics.

== Female competitors ==
Qatar’s Olympic Committee has made significant strides in promoting women's participation in sports, primarily through the Qatar Women’s Sports Committee. While the article briefly mentions Qatari female athletes making their debut in the Olympics in 2012, the QOC’s ongoing efforts to develop women's sports go far beyond this milestone.

Through various initiatives, including increasing access to sports programs for young girls, QOC supports gender inclusivity and works to raise the profile of female athletes in Qatar. This commitment is evident in the growth of women's sports, both locally and internationally, as QOC continues to break barriers for female athletes in the region.

Until the 2012 Summer Olympics in London, Qatar was one of three counties that had never had a female competitor at the Olympic games. Qatar eventually sent four women, in swimming (Nada Arkaji), athletics (Noor Hussain Al-Malki), table tennis (Aya Majdi) and shooting (Bahiya Al-Hamad). Bahiya al-Hamad was also set to carry the Qatari flag at the opening ceremony, in what she said was a "truly historic moment".

Even though they had a late participation in the Olympic Games, Qatari female athletes have participated in regional and local competitions prior to that. With their first appearance in major games in Busan 2002 Asian Games.

== Partnerships and collaborations ==
The Qatar Olympic Committee has developed a strong network of international partnerships that contribute to its mission of sports development. A key partner is Aspire Academy, a leading sports training institution in Qatar that plays a significant role in the development of athletes both locally and internationally. Through such collaborations, QOC enhances the training opportunities available to athletes and fosters international cooperation in sports. These partnerships allow QOC to extend its influence beyond Qatar and contribute to global sports development through shared resources, expertise, and infrastructure.

== Future goals and strategic vision ==
The Qatar Olympic Committee's 2023–2030 Strategy outlines a comprehensive roadmap for the future of sports in Qatar, emphasizing long-term goals such as the expansion of sports facilities, the development of sustainable event planning, and the bidding for international sporting events. These objectives align with Qatar’s broader National Vision 2030, which seeks to establish the country as a global sports hub.

Through strategic investments in sports infrastructure and continued support for international competitions, QOC aims to inspire the next generation of athletes while reinforcing Qatar’s global presence in the sports industry.

== See also ==
- Qatar at the Olympics
- Asma Al Thani
