= Swimming at the 2003 World Aquatics Championships – Men's 50 metre butterfly =

Men's 50m Butterfly at the 2003 FINA World Aquatics Championships
- Dates: 20 July (prelims & semifinals); 21 July (final)
- Winning time: 23.43 seconds

Medalists
gold medal	Matt Welsh	Australia
silver medal	Ian Crocker	United States
bronze medal	Evgueni Korotychkine	Russia

The Men's 50 Butterfly event at the 10th FINA World Aquatics Championships swam July 20–21, 2003 in Barcelona, Spain. Preliminary and Semifinal heats swam on 20 July, with the Final swum on 21 July.

At the start of the event, the existing World (WR) and Championship (CR) records were both:

- WR & CR: 23.44 swum by Geoff Huegill (Australia) on July 27, 2001 in Fukuoka, Japan

== Results ==
=== Final ===
Place	Swimmer	Nation	Time	Notes
1	Matt Welsh	Australia	23.43	WR
2	Ian Crocker	USA	23.62	
3	Evgueni Korotychkine	Russia	23.73	
4	Geoff Huegill	Australia	23.76	
5	Roland Schoeman	South Africa	23.79	
6	Thomas Rupprath	Germany	23.83	
7	Mark Foster	Great Britain	23.86	
8	Fernando Scherer	Brazil	23.96	

=== Semifinals ===
Rank	Heat + Lane	Swimmer	Nation	Time	Notes
1	S2 L4	Ian Crocker	USA	23.47	q
2	S1 L4	Geoff Huegill	Australia	23.61	q
3	S1 L5	Thomas Rupprath	Germany	23.75	q
4	S1 L1	Mark Foster	Great Britain	23.76	q
5	S1 L3	Fernando Scherer	Brazil	23.86	q
5	S2 L5	Evgueni Korotychkine	Russia	23.86	q
7	S2 L7	Roland Schoeman	South Africa	23.88	q
8	S1 L7	Matt Welsh	Australia	23.91	q
9	S1 L6	Mike Mintenko	Canada	23.97	q
10	S1 L2	Lars Frölander	Sweden	23.98	q
11	S2 L1	Sergiy Breus	Ukraine	24.03	q
12	S2 L6	Jere Hård	Finland	24.09	q
12	S2 L3	Andrii Serdinov	Ukraine	24.09	q
14	S2 L2	Joris Keizer	Netherlands	24.16	q
15	S2 L8	Ryo Takayasu	Japan	24.41	q
16	S1 L8	Zsolt Gáspár	Hungary	24.43	q

=== Preliminaries ===
Rank	Heat+Lane	Swimmer	Nation	Time	Notes
1	H14 L6	Ian Crocker	United States	23.73	q
2	H15 L4	Geoff Huegill	Australia	23.75	q
2	H16 L3	Evgueni Korotychkine	Russia	23.75	q
4	H15 L5	Thomas Rupprath	Germany	23.76	q
5	H16 L6	Andrii Serdinov	Ukraine	23.90	q
6	H15 L6	Fernando Scherer	Brazil	24.04	q
7	H16 L4	Jere Hård	Finland	24.12	q
8	H15 L2	Mike Mintenko	Canada	24.14	q
9	H16 L5	Joris Keizer	Netherlands	24.16	q
10	H14 L5	Lars Frölander	Sweden	24.17	q
11	H14 L4	Roland Schoeman	South Africa	24.21	q
12	H15 L3	Matt Welsh	Australia	24.23	q
13	H14 L2	Sergiy Breus	Ukraine	24.28	q
14	H14 L3	Mark Foster	Great Britain	24.34	q
15	H16 L8	Ryo Takayasu	Japan	24.43	q
16	H16 L2	Zsolt Gáspár	Hungary	24.44	q
17	H12 L4	Tero Välimaa	Finland	24.45	
18	H16 L7	Igor Marchenko	Russia	24.47	
19	H12 L1	Neil Walker	United States	24.51	
20	H05 L3	Ricardo Busquets	Puerto Rico	24.52	
21	H15 L8	Josh Ilika	Mexico	24.53	
22	H13 L4	Ales Volcansek	Croatia	24.59	
23	H13 L7	Ryan Pini	Papua New Guinea	24.61	
24	H12 L6	Petter Sjødal	Norway	24.66	
25	H13 L5	Takashi Yamamoto	Japan	24.67	
26	H13 L3	Eugene Botes	South Africa	24.70	
27	H13 L6	Mattia Nalesso	Italy	24.72	
28	H11 L5	Octavio Alesi	Venezuela	24.75	
29	H14 L7	Apostolos Tsagkarakis	Greece	24.76	
30	H13 L8	Danil Haustov	Estonia	24.77	
31	H15 L7	Corney Swanepoel	New Zealand	24.80	
32	H15 L1	Simão Morgado	Portugal	24.82	
33	H14 L1	Ravil Nachaev	Uzbekistan	24.83	
34	H12 L5	Camilo Becerra	Colombia	24.86	
35	H13 L2	Pavel Lagoun	Belarus	24.89	
36	H13 L1	Erik Andersson	Sweden	24.94	
37	H12 L7	Luc Decker	Luxembourg	25.05	
37	H16 L1	Pablo Martín Abal	Argentina	25.05	
39	H12 L2	Julio Santos	Ecuador	25.12	
40	H14 L8	Nicholas Santos	Brazil	25.15	
41	H12 L3	Ioan Gherghel	Romania	25.16	
42	H12 L8	Georgi Palazov	Bulgaria	25.17	
43	H07 L7	Mihály Flaskay	Hungary	25.23	
44	H10 L2	Zoran Lazarovski	Macedonia	25.26	
45	H10 L8	Guntars Deicmans	Latvia	25.34	
46	H11 L6	Rimvydas Šalčius	Lithuania	25.37	
47	H11 L2	Aleksandar Miladinovski	Macedonia	25.43	
48	H10 L6	Jeong Doo-Hee	South Korea	25.44	
49	H11 L4	Nicholas Rees	Bahamas	25.45	
50	H10 L4	Pedro Silva	Portugal	25.53	
51	H11 L7	Oleg Lyashko	Uzbekistan	25.55	
52	H01 L2	Huazhang Zheng	China	25.63	
53	H11 L3	Stavros Michaelides	Cyprus	25.64	
54	H09 L3	Wing Cheung Victor Wong	Macau	25.66	
55	H11 L8	Orel Oral	Turkey	25.71	
56	H11 L1	Rustam Khudiyev	Kazakhstan	25.75	
57	H10 L3	Ken Tomson	Estonia	25.84	
58	H10 L5	Conrad Francis	Sri Lanka	25.92	
59	H07 L1	Ismael Ortiz	Panama	26.09	
60	H08 L5	Jorge Arce	Costa Rica	26.13	
61	H10 L1	Yu Lung Lubrey Lim	Malaysia	26.20	
62	H08 L4	Nicholas Bovell	Trinidad and Tobago	26.21	
63	H08 L3	Musa Bakare	Nigeria	26.25	
64	H09 L4	Cliff Gittens	Barbados	26.27	
65	H09 L6	Ignacio Sanchez Leon	Peru	26.34	
66	H07 L8	Miguel Navarro	Bolivia	26.42	
67	H09 L1	Carles Ridaura	Andorra	26.48	
68	H06 L2	Abed Rahman Kaaki	Lebanon	26.53	
69	H07 L2	Gunther Streit	Namibia	26.58	
70	H07 L6	Gregory Arkhurst	Ivory Coast	26.61	
71	H06 L3	Rama Vyombo	Kenya	26.63	
72	H08 L6	Ayoub Al-Mas	United Arab Emirates	26.70	
72	H09 L8	Gordon Touw Ngie Tjouw	Suriname	26.70	
74	H08 L8	James Walsh	Philippines	26.71	
75	H06 L5	William Muriel	Ecuador	26.73	
76	H06 L4	Gustavo Adolfo Martinez	Honduras	26.77	
77	H09 L2	Shui Ki Szeto	Hong Kong	26.78	
78	H06 L1	Davy Bisslik	Aruba	26.79	
78	H08 L2	Zurab Khomasuridze	Georgia	26.79	
80	H10 L7	Aloïs Dansou	Benin	26.83	
81	H06 L8	Kenny Roberts	Seychelles	26.88	
82	H07 L3	Chad Miller	Fiji	26.91	
83	H09 L7	Fadi Jalabi	Syria	26.96	
84	H07 L5	Jean Paul Adam	Seychelles	27.00	
85	H08 L1	Nedim Nišić	Bosnia and Herzegovina	27.01	
86	H05 L5	Khaly Ciss	Senegal	27.08	
87	H09 L5	Jewel Ahmed	Bangladesh	27.21	
88	H06 L6	Rafael de Leon Alfaro	Guatemala	27.24	
89	H05 L4	Yann Lausan	Tahiti	27.31	
90	H05 L1	Kuan Fong Lao	Macau	27.33	
91	H05 L7	João Aguiar	Angola	27.51	
92	H04 L7	Ranui Teriipaia	Tahiti	27.68	
93	H04 L4	Sean Chow	Fiji	27.73	
94	H04 L3	Dean Palacios	Northern Mariana Islands	27.91	
95	H03 L6	Ilidio Matusse	Mozambique	27.93	
96	H05 L2	Zaid Almarafi	Jordan	27.98	
97	H02 L5	Anderson Bonabart	Federated States of Micronesia	28.07	
98	H04 L8	Aung Kyaw Moe	Myanmar	28.19	
99	H03 L8	Ibrahim Maliki	Niger	28.30	
99	H04 L5	Clark Randrianandraina	Madagascar	28.30	
99	H05 L6	Zaid K. Saeed	Iraq	28.30	
102	H04 L1	Yan Lin Aung	Myanmar	28.41	
103	H06 L7	Rad Aweisat	Palestine	28.43	
104	H03 L2	Connor Keith	Guam	28.58	
105	H03 L4	Fernando Medrano	Nicaragua	28.67	
106	H04 L6	Omar Núñez	Nicaragua	28.78	
107	H05 L8	Nuno Rola	Angola	28.82	
108	H03 L3	Rony Bakale	Republic of the Congo	28.90	
109	H03 L7	Muzeya Muzyamba	Zambia	29.13	
110	H01 L3	Hassan Mubah	Maldives	29.77	
111	H03 L5	Marzoyq Al Salem	Kuwait	29.98	
112	H02 L6	Sikhounxay Ounkhamphanyavong	Laos	30.06	
113	H03 L1	Enkhmandakh Khurlee	Mongolia	30.33	
114	H02 L3	Edgar Luberenga	Uganda	30.60	
115	H02 L4	Gilbert Kaburu	Uganda	31.47	
116	H02 L7	Chisela Kanchela	Zambia	31.81	
117	H02 L1	Joshua Marfleet	Samoa	31.83	
118	H02 L2	Sarmad A.A. Mohamad	Iraq	32.03	
-	H02 L8	Ali Maiga Akibou	Niger	DQ	
-	-	Ayoub Salem Mallalah	United Arab Emirates	DNS	
-	-	Ahmed Ouattara Zie	Ivory Coast	DNS	
-	-	Issam Halawani	Palestine	DNS	
-	-	Maximilien J. Doualla Frederic	Cameroon	DNS	
-	-	Sadrack Franklin Massok	Cameroon	DNS	
-	-	Emery Nziyunvira	Burundi	DNS	
