= Mohamed Abdul Hamid =

Sudanese swimmer

Personal information
- Full name: Mohamed Abdul Hamid
- National team: Sudan
- Born: 24 December 1980 (age 45) Khartoum, Sudan
- Height: 1.75 m (5 ft 9 in)
- Weight: 55 kg (121 lb)

Sport
- Sport: Swimming
- Strokes: Freestyle

Mohamed Abdul Hamid (Arabic: محمد عبد الحميد; born December 24, 1980) is a Sudanese former swimmer, who specialized in sprint freestyle events. Hamid competed for Sudan in the men's 50 m freestyle at the 2000 Summer Olympics in Sydney. He received a ticket from FINA, under a Universality program, without meeting an entry time. He challenged six other swimmers in heat one, including 16-year-olds Wael Ghassan of Qatar and Hassan Mubah of the Maldives. Before the start of his heat, Hamid immediately jumped into the pool first, and was cast out of the race for breaching a no false-start rule in the prelims.
