= Ganaagiin Galbadrakh =

Mongolian swimmer (born 1974)

Personal information
- Full name: Ganaagiin Galbadrakh
- National team: Mongolia
- Born: 3 May 1974 (age 52) Ulaanbaatar, Mongolia
- Height: 1.78 m (5 ft 10 in)
- Weight: 75 kg (165 lb)

Sport
- Sport: Swimming
- Strokes: Freestyle

Ganaagiin Galbadrakh (Mongolian: Ганаагийн Галбадрах; born May 3, 1974) is a Mongolian former swimmer, who specialized in sprint freestyle events. Galbadrakh represented Mongolia at the 2000 Summer Olympics, and eventually, at the 2002 Asian Games in Busan, South Korea, where he finished only in the prelims.

Galbadrakh competed only in the men's 100 m freestyle at the 2000 Summer Olympics in Sydney. He received a Universality place from FINA, in an entry time of 54.94. He challenged six other swimmers in heat two, including 15-year-olds Ragi Edde of Lebanon and Dawood Youssef of Bahrain. He pulled himself farther from the top field to a fourth seed in 58.79, nearly four seconds below his entry standard and 5.24 behind leader Gregory Arkhurst of Côte d'Ivoire. Galbadrakh failed to advance into the semifinals, as he placed sixty-seventh overall in the prelims.
