= Muhammad Ahmed (swimmer) =

Iraqi swimmer (born 1976)

Personal information
- Full name: Muhammad Abdul Elah Ahmed
- National team: Iraq
- Born: 25 October 1976 (age 49) Baghdad, Iraq
- Height: 1.70 m (5 ft 7 in)
- Weight: 61 kg (134 lb)

Sport
- Sport: Swimming
- Strokes: Freestyle

Muhammad Abdul Elah Ahmed (Arabic: محمد عبد الإله أحمد; born October 25, 1976, in Baghdad) is an Iraqi former swimmer, who specialized in sprint freestyle events. Ahmed competed for Iraq in the men's 50 m freestyle at the 2000 Summer Olympics in Sydney. He received a ticket from FINA, under a Universality program, in an entry time of 25.50. He challenged seven other swimmers in heat two, including teenagers Khalid Al-Kulaibi of Oman (aged 14) and Sikhounxay Ounkhamphanyavong of Laos (aged 17). Diving in with a 0.66-second deficit, he overhauled a 26-second barrier and came up with a spectacular swim to pick up a third seed in 25.84, 34-hundredths of a second below his entry standard. Ahmed failed to advance into the semifinals, as he placed sixty-fourth overall out of 80 swimmers in the prelims.
