= João Aguiar (swimmer) =

Angolan swimmer (born 1983)

João Paquete Aguiar
- Born: September 8, 1983 (age 42)
- Occupation: Swimmer
- Known for: Represented Angola, as a 17-year-old, at the 2000 Summer Olympics

João Carlos da Silva Paquete Aguiar (born September 8, 1983) is an Angolan swimmer, who specialized in sprint freestyle events. He represented Angola, as a 17-year-old, at the 2000 Summer Olympics, and held numerous Angolan titles and meet records in the 50 m freestyle, while playing for August 1 Swimming Club in Luanda.

Aguiar competed only in the men's 50 m freestyle at the 2000 Summer Olympics in Sydney. He received a ticket from FINA, under a Universality program, in an entry time of 24.00. He challenged seven other swimmers in heat three, including two-time Olympians Howard Hinds of the Netherlands Antilles and Emin Guliyev of Azerbaijan. He rounded out the field to last place in 25.70, just 1.7 seconds below his entry standard, and 1.98 behind leader Estebán Blanco of Costa Rica. Aguiar failed to advance into the semifinals, as he placed sixty-third overall in the prelims. He is currently a swimming advisor at Luanda International School. He regularly coaches MiniLiga swim meets.
