= Omar Hughes =

Grenadian swimmer (born 1982)

Personal information
- Born: March 4, 1982 (age 44) St. George's, Grenada

Sport
- Sport: Swimming

Omar Hughes (born March 4, 1982, in St. George's) is a Grenadian former swimmer, who specialized in sprint freestyle events. Hughes competed for Grenada in the men's 50 m freestyle at the 2000 Summer Olympics in Sydney. He received a ticket from FINA, under a Universality program, in an entry time of 24.00. He challenged seven other swimmers in heat three, including two-time Olympians Howard Hinds of the Netherlands Antilles and Emin Guliyev of Azerbaijan. He raced to the fifth seed in 25.06, more than a second outside his entry standard. Hughes failed to advance into the semifinals, as he placed fifty-seventh overall in the prelims.
