= Christophe Lim Wen Ying =

Mauritian swimmer (born 1981)

Christophe Lim
Personal information
- Full name: Christophe Lim Wen Ying
- National team: Mauritius
- Born: 17 October 1981 (age 44)
- Height: 1.73 m (5 ft 8 in)
- Weight: 70 kg (154 lb)

Sport
- Sport: Swimming
- Strokes: Freestyle
- Club: Riverton Aquanauts

Christophe Lim Wen Ying (born October 17, 1981) is a Mauritian former swimmer, who specialized in sprint freestyle events. Lim competed for Mauritius in the men's 100 m freestyle at the 2000 Summer Olympics in Sydney. He received a Universality place from FINA, in an entry time of 54.14. He challenged six other swimmers in heat two, including 15-year-olds Ragi Edde of Lebanon and Dawood Youssef of Bahrain. He raced to a third-place finish in 54.33, just 0.19 seconds below his entry standard and 0.78 behind leader Gregory Arkhurst of Côte d'Ivoire. Lim failed to advance into the semifinals, as he placed sixty-sixth overall in the prelims. He also has 3 children, 1 who is a very fast swimmer and dominates Western Australian Swimming.
