= Bakary Sereme =

Malian swimmer (born 1981)

Personal information
- Full name: Bakary Sereme
- Nickname: Kai
- National team: Mali
- Born: 4 June 1981 (age 45) Bamako, Mali
- Height: 1.85 m (6 ft 1 in)
- Weight: 75 kg (165 lb)

Sport
- Sport: Swimming
- Strokes: Freestyle

Bakary Sereme (born June 4, 1981) is a Malian former swimmer, who specialized in sprint freestyle events, and later became a professional model based in Australia. Sereme competed for Mali in the men's 50 m freestyle at the 2000 Summer Olympics in Sydney. He received a ticket from FINA, under a Universality program, with an entry time of 33.10. He challenged six other swimmers in heat one, including 16-year-olds Wael Ghassan of Qatar and Hassan Mubah of the Maldives. Diving in with a 0.86-second deficit, Sereme scorched the field to overhaul a thirty-second barrier and post a sixth-seeded time of 29.69, sufficiently enough for his lifetime best. Sereme failed to advance into the semifinals, as he placed seventy-third overall out of 80 swimmers in the prelims.

Shortly after the Olympics, Sereme decided to stay on to pursue other opportunities available in Australia. In 2008, he appeared as one of the finalists in Seven Network's reality television show series Make Me a Supermodel.
