= Stephenson Wallace =

Saint Vincent and the Grenadines swimmer (born 1982)

Personal information
- Full name: Stephenson Antonio Wallace
- National team: St. Vincent
- Born: 11 November 1982 (age 43) Kingstown, St. Vincent and the Grenadines
- Height: 1.70 m (5 ft 7 in)
- Weight: 64 kg (141 lb)

Sport
- Sport: Swimming
- Strokes: Freestyle

Stephenson Antonio Wallace (born November 11, 1982) is a former swimmer from Saint Vincent and the Grenadines, who specialized in sprint freestyle events. Wallace competed only in the men's 50 m freestyle at the 2000 Summer Olympics in Sydney. He received a ticket from FINA, under a Universality program, in an entry time of 29.58. He challenged six other swimmers in heat one, including 16-year-olds Wael Ghassan of Qatar and Hassan Mubah of the Maldives. Diving in with a 0.87-second deficit, Wallace scorched the field to post a fourth-seeded time and a lifetime best of 27.84. Wallace failed to advance into the semifinals, as he placed seventy-first overall out of 80 swimmers in the prelims.
