= Swimming at the 2000 Summer Olympics – Men's 50 metre freestyle =

Men's 50 metre freestyle at the Games of the XXVII Olympiad
- Venue: Sydney International Aquatic Centre
- Date: September 21, 2000 (heats & semifinals); September 22, 2000 (final)
- Competitors: 80 from 73 nations
- Winning time: 21.98

Medalists
1st place, gold medalist(s)		Anthony Ervin; United States
1st place, gold medalist(s)		Gary Hall, Jr. United States
3rd place, bronze medalist(s)		Pieter van den Hoogenband; Netherlands

The men's 50 metre freestyle event at the 2000 Summer Olympics took place on 21–22 September 2000 at the Sydney International Aquatic Centre in Sydney, Australia.

U.S. swimmers Gary Hall, Jr. and Anthony Ervin, who trained together at the Phoenix Swim Club, tied for the gold; they finished with a matching time of 21.98, edging out Dutch swimmer Pieter van den Hoogenband in 22.03.

Italy's Lorenzo Vismara finished fourth in 22.11, while Poland's Bartosz Kizierowski was a fraction behind the leading pack in sixth at 22.22. Russia's double defending champion Alexander Popov finished outside the medals in sixth place with a time of 22.24. Great Britain's four-time Olympian Mark Foster (22.41) and Ukraine's Oleksandr Volynets (22.51) rounded out the finale. Earlier in the prelims, Volynets made a surprise packet with a ninth fastest time and a Ukrainian record of 22.52 to lead the sixth heat.

Ervin stopped swimming competitively in 2003, auctioned off his gold medal on eBay to aid survivors of the 2004 tsunami, but returned from retirement to claim his place on his second Olympics, in London, twelve years after his first. Both men would later continue to win another gold in this event outright (Hall, Jr. in 2004 and Ervin in 2016), edging out the runner-up by 0.01 second in their respective races.

== Records ==
Prior to this competition, the existing world and Olympic records were as follows.

World record	Alexander Popov (RUS)	21.64	Moscow, Russia	16 June 2000
Olympic record	Alexander Popov (EUN)	21.91	Barcelona, Spain	30 July 1992

== Competition format ==
In a change from previous Games, the competition consisted of three rounds: heats, semifinals, and a final. The swimmers with the best 16 times in the heats advanced to the semifinals. The swimmers with the best 8 times in the semifinals advanced to the final. Swim-offs were used as necessary to break ties for advancement to the next round.

== Results ==
=== Heats ===
Rank	Heat	Lane	Name	Nation	Time	Notes
1	9	6	Bartosz Kizierowski	Poland	22.05	Q, NR
2	9	4	Gary Hall, Jr.	United States	22.14	Q
3	10	4	Alexander Popov	Russia	22.15	Q
4	8	4	Anthony Ervin	United States	22.24	Q
5	10	5	Pieter van den Hoogenband	Netherlands	22.32	Q
6	8	6	Ricardo Busquets	Puerto Rico	22.42	Q
7	10	6	Brett Hawke	Australia	22.45	Q
8	9	5	Brendon Dedekind	South Africa	22.48	Q
9	6	2	Oleksandr Volynets	Ukraine	22.52	Q, NR
10	10	3	Roland Mark Schoeman	South Africa	22.53	Q
10	8	7	Stefan Nystrand	Sweden	22.53	Q, NR
12	9	2	Johan Kenkhuis	Netherlands	22.61	Q
13	8	5	Lorenzo Vismara	Italy	22.62	Q
14	8	3	Mark Foster	Great Britain	22.65	Q
15	9	8	Denis Pimankov	Russia	22.74	Q
16	10	2	Chris Fydler	Australia	22.80	Q
17	7	4	Jiang Chengji	China	22.82	
17	6	6	Kim Min-suk	South Korea	22.82	NR
19	10	8	Julio Santos	Ecuador	22.83	
20	9	3	Fernando Scherer	Brazil	22.88	
21	8	2	José Meolans	Argentina	22.89	
22	8	1	Salim Iles	Algeria	22.95	
23	10	7	Edvaldo Silva Filho	Brazil	22.96	
23	8	8	Eduardo Lorente	Spain	22.96	
25	6	8	Peter Mankoč	Slovenia	23.02	
26	7	6	Attila Zubor	Hungary	23.03	
27	6	7	Stavros Michaelides	Cyprus	23.05	
28	7	1	Stephan Kunzelmann	Germany	23.08	
29	10	1	Indrek Sei	Estonia	23.11	
30	5	1	Ravil Nachaev	Uzbekistan	23.12	
31	7	2	Christophe Bühler	Switzerland	23.15	
32	7	7	Marijan Kanjer	Croatia	23.16	
33	7	5	Marcos Hernández	Cuba	23.20	
34	7	3	Dzmitry Kalinouski	Belarus	23.21	
34	6	5	Yoav Bruck	Israel	23.21	
36	7	8	Pedro Silva	Portugal	23.27	
37	5	4	Allan Murray	Bahamas	23.34	
38	6	1	Rolandas Gimbutis	Lithuania	23.36	
39	6	4	Thierry Wouters	Belgium	23.44	
40	4	1	Sergey Borisenko	Kazakhstan	23.46	
41	4	4	Sergey Ashihmin	Kyrgyzstan	23.53	
42	5	7	Richard Sam Bera	Indonesia	23.56	
43	5	8	Nebojša Bikić	FR Yugoslavia	23.57	
44	5	2	Camilo Becerra	Colombia	23.63	
45	3	4	Estebán Blanco	Costa Rica	23.72	NR
46	5	6	Tamer Hamed	Egypt	23.77	
47	4	8	Serghei Stolearenco	Moldova	23.84	
48	4	3	Paul Kutscher	Uruguay	23.90	
49	4	7	Luis López Hartinger	Peru	24.00	
49	4	6	Leslie Kwok	Singapore	24.00	
51	4	2	Huang Chih-yung	Chinese Taipei	24.01	
52	3	5	Howard Hinds	Netherlands Antilles	24.07	
53	4	5	Harbeth Fu Wing	Hong Kong	24.20	
54	3	8	Zurab Beridze	Georgia	24.28	
55	5	3	Rodrigo Olivares	Chile	24.50	
56	3	1	Ayoub Al-Mas	United Arab Emirates	24.91	
57	3	3	Omar Hughes	Grenada	25.07	
58	3	2	Dmitri Margaryan	Armenia	25.29	
59	2	6	Jamie Peterkin	Saint Lucia	25.33	
60	3	7	Emin Guliyev	Azerbaijan	25.36	
61	1	1	Wael Ghassan	Qatar	25.43	
62	2	4	Davy Bisslik	Aruba	25.57	
63	3	6	João Aguiar	Angola	25.70	
64	2	5	Muhammad Ahmed	Iraq	25.84	
65	2	3	Ilidio Matusse	Mozambique	26.28	
66	2	8	Hem Kiri	Cambodia	26.41	
67	2	1	Kenneth Maronie	Dominica	26.85	
68	2	7	Khalid Al-Kulaibi	Oman	26.96	
69	1	5	Chitra Bahadur Gurung	Nepal	27.02	
70	2	2	Sikhounxay Ounkhamphanyavong	Laos	27.03	
71	1	4	Anlloyd Samuel	Palau	27.24	
72	1	3	Stephenson Wallace	Saint Vincent and the Grenadines	27.84	
73	1	6	Hassan Mubah	Maldives	28.86	
74	1	2	Bakary Sereme	Mali	29.69	
75	1	8	Samson Ndayishimiye	Rwanda	38.76	
	1	7	Mohamed Abdul Hamid	Sudan	DSQ	
	6	3	Craig Hutchison	Canada	DSQ	
	5	5	Francisco Sánchez	Venezuela	DNS	
	9	1	Romain Barnier	France	DNS	
	9	7	Lars Frölander	Sweden	DNS	

=== Semifinals ===
Rank	Heat	Lane	Name	Nation	Time	Notes
1	1	4	Gary Hall, Jr.	United States	22.07	Q
2	2	3	Pieter van den Hoogenband	Netherlands	22.11	Q
3	1	5	Anthony Ervin	United States	22.13	Q
4	2	5	Alexander Popov	Russia	22.17	Q
5	2	1	Lorenzo Vismara	Italy	22.30	Q
6	1	1	Mark Foster	Great Britain	22.32	Q
7	2	4	Bartosz Kizierowski	Poland	22.35	Q
8	2	2	Oleksandr Volynets	Ukraine	22.36	Q, NR
9	1	6	Brendon Dedekind	South Africa	22.39	
10	1	8	Chris Fydler	Australia	22.41	
10	2	7	Roland Mark Schoeman	South Africa	22.41	
12	1	7	Johan Kenkhuis	Netherlands	22.47	
13	2	6	Brett Hawke	Australia	22.49	
13	1	2	Stefan Nystrand	Sweden	22.49	NR
15	1	3	Ricardo Busquets	Puerto Rico	22.51	
16	2	8	Denis Pimankov	Russia	22.89	

=== Final ===
Rank	Lane	Name	Nation	Time	Notes
1st place, gold medalist(s)	4	Gary Hall, Jr.	United States	21.98	
1st place, gold medalist(s)	3	Anthony Ervin	United States	21.98	
3rd place, bronze medalist(s)	5	Pieter van den Hoogenband	Netherlands	22.03	
4	2	Lorenzo Vismara	Italy	22.11	
5	1	Bartosz Kizierowski	Poland	22.22	
6	6	Alexander Popov	Russia	22.24	
7	7	Mark Foster	Great Britain	22.41	
8	8	Oleksandr Volynets	Ukraine	22.51	
