= Kenneth Maronie =

Dominica swimmer (born 1980)

Personal information
- Full name: Kenneth Maronie
- National team: Dominica
- Born: 4 March 1980 (age 46) Massacre, Dominica
- Height: 1.85 m (6 ft 1 in)
- Weight: 68 kg (150 lb)

Sport
- Sport: Swimming
- Strokes: Freestyle

Kenneth Maronie (born March 4, 1980) is a Dominican former swimmer, who specialized in sprint freestyle events. Maronie competed for Dominica in the men's 50 m freestyle at the 2000 Summer Olympics in Sydney. He received a ticket from FINA, under a Universality program, in an entry time of 26.96. He challenged seven other swimmers in heat two, including teenagers Khalid Al-Kulaibi of Oman (aged 14) and Sikhounxay Ounkhamphanyavong of Laos (aged 17). He faded down the stretch of the race to register a sixth-place time and a personal best of 26.85. Maronie failed to advance into the semifinals, as he placed sixty-seventh overall out of 80 swimmers in the prelims.
