= Anlloyd Samuel =

Palauan swimmer

Personal information
- Full name: Anlloyd Samuel
- National team: Palau
- Born: 31 October 1980
- Died: 15 November 2010 (aged 30) Koror, Palau

Sport
- Sport: Swimming
- Strokes: Freestyle

Anlloyd Samuel (October 31, 1980 – November 15, 2010) was a Palauan swimmer, who specialized in sprint freestyle events. He became the first ever swimmer in history to represent Palau at the Summer Olympics in 2000.

Samuel competed only in the men's 50 m freestyle at the 2000 Summer Olympics in Sydney. He received a ticket from FINA, under a Universality program, in an entry time of 27.23, a Palauan record. He challenged six other swimmers in heat one, including 16-year-olds Wael Ghassan of Qatar and Hassan Mubah of the Maldives. Entering the race with a fastest-seeded time, Samuel faded down the stretch to take a third spot in 27.24, a small fraction below his lifetime best and an entry standard. Samuel failed to advance into the semifinals, as he placed seventy-first overall out of 80 swimmers in the prelims.

After his only Olympic stint, Samuel worked as a dive master and boat operator for Sam's Tour in Koror. On November 15, 2010, he was found unconscious in his car at Echang Dock. According to reports, he was brought to the hospital where doctors were unable to resuscitate him. The reason for his death is unknown.
