= Tamer Hamed =

Egyptian swimmer

Personal information
- Full name: Tamer Hamed Ali Zinhom; Muhammad
- National team: Egypt
- Born: 4 February 1974 (age 52) Cairo, Egypt
- Height: 1.90 m (6 ft 3 in)
- Weight: 80 kg (176 lb)

Sport
- Sport: Swimming
- Strokes: Freestyle, butterfly
- Club: Al-Ahly Swim Club

Tamer Hamed Ali Zinhom Muhammad (also Tamer Hamed, Arabic: تامر حامد علي زينهم محمد; born February 4, 1974) is an Egyptian former swimmer, who specialized in sprint freestyle and butterfly events. He is a two-time Olympian (1996 and 2000), and an Egyptian record holder in the 50 m freestyle.

Hamed made his official debut at the 1996 Summer Olympics in Atlanta. He failed to reach the top 16 final in any of his individual events, finishing forty-sixth in the 100 m butterfly (56.46), and forty-seventh each in the 50 m freestyle (24.02) and 100 m freestyle (52.16).

At the 2000 Summer Olympics in Sydney, Hamed competed only in a sprint freestyle double. He achieved FINA B-standards of 23.39 (50 m freestyle) and 52.14 (100 m freestyle) from the Egyptian Championships in Cairo. In the 100 m freestyle, Hamed placed forty-fourth on the morning prelims. Swimming in heat four, he edged out Colombia's Fernando Jácome and Singapore's Mark Chay to race for a fourth seed by a tenth of a second (0.10) in 52.14. Two days later, in the 50 m freestyle, Hamed participated in heat five against seven other swimmers, including three-time Olympians Richard Sam Bera of Indonesia and Allan Murray of the Bahamas, top 16 finalist in Atlanta four years earlier. He raced to a fifth seed and forty-sixth overall in 23.77, just a small fraction off his entry time.
