= Athletics at the 2000 Summer Olympics =

Athletics at the Games of the XXVII Olympiad
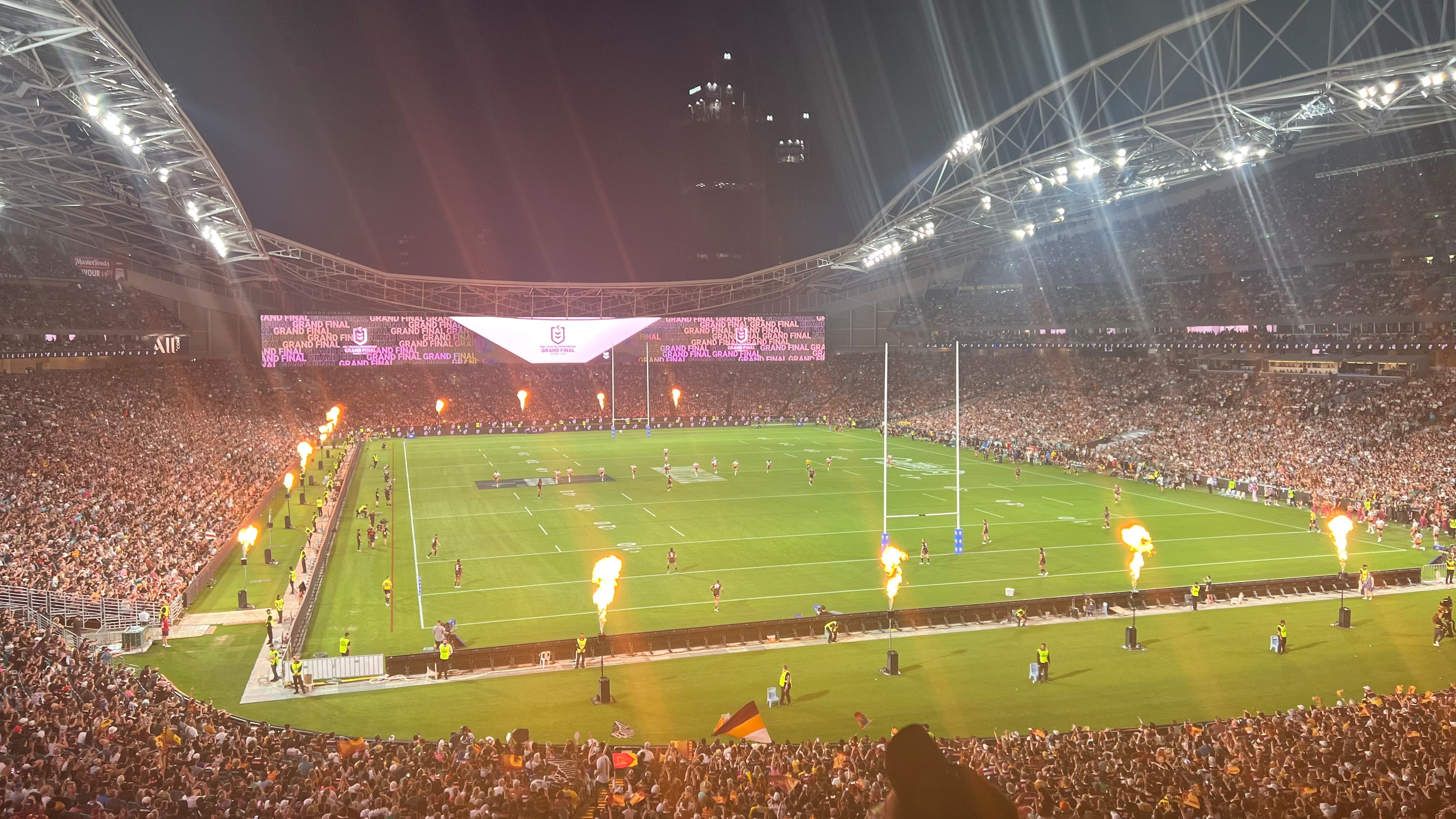
- Host stadium (shown in 2023)
- Dates: 22 September-1 October 2000
- No. of events: 46
- Competitors: 2,134 from 193 nations

At the 2000 Summer Olympics in Sydney, 46 events in athletics were contested, 24 for men and 22 for women. There were a total number of 2,134 participating athletes from 193 countries.

== Medal table ==
Rank	Nation	Gold	Silver	Bronze	Total
1	United States	7	4	5	16
2	Ethiopia	4	1	3	8
3	Poland	4	0	0	4
4	Russia	3	4	6	13
5	Kenya	2	3	2	7
6	Cuba	2	2	2	6
6	Great Britain	2	2	2	6
8	Germany	2	1	2	5
9	Belarus	2	0	3	5
10	Bahamas	2	0	1	3
11	Greece	1	3	0	4
12	Romania	1	2	2	5
13	Australia	1	2	0	3
14	Algeria	1	1	2	4
15	Czech Republic	1	1	0	2
15	Nigeria	1	1	0	2
15	Norway	1	1	0	2
18	Bulgaria	1	0	0	1
18	China	1	0	0	1
18	Estonia	1	0	0	1
18	Finland	1	0	0	1
18	Japan	1	0	0	1
18	Kazakhstan	1	0	0	1
18	Lithuania	1	0	0	1
18	Mozambique	1	0	0	1
26	Jamaica	0	6	3	9
27	Italy	0	2	0	2
28	Morocco	0	1	3	4
29	South Africa	0	1	2	3
30	Mexico	0	1	1	2
30	Trinidad and Tobago	0	1	1	2
32	Austria	0	1	0	1
32	Brazil	0	1	0	1
32	Denmark	0	1	0	1
32	Ireland	0	1	0	1
32	Latvia	0	1	0	1
32	Saudi Arabia	0	1	0	1
32	Sri Lanka	0	1	0	1
39	Ukraine	0	0	2	2
40	Barbados	0	0	1	1
40	Iceland	0	0	1	1
40	Portugal	0	0	1	1
40	Spain	0	0	1	1
40	Sweden	0	0	1	1
Totals (44 entries)		45	47	47	139

== Participating nations ==
A total of 193 nations participated in the different athletics events at the 2000 Summer Olympics. Two athletes from East Timor participated as individual Olympic athletes. A total of 2135 athletes competed at the competition.

- Albania (3 athletes)
- Algeria (21)
- American Samoa (2)
- Andorra (2)
- Angola (2)
- Antigua and Barbuda (2)
- Argentina (11)
- Armenia (3)
- Aruba (2)
- Australia (82)
- Austria (12)
- Azerbaijan (4)
- Bahamas (19)
- Bahrain (2)
- Bangladesh (2)
- Barbados (11)
- Belarus (31)
- Belgium (9)
- Belize (2)
- Benin (2)
- Bermuda (1)
- Bolivia (2)
- Bosnia and Herzegovina (4)
- Botswana (6)
- Brazil (18)
- British Virgin Islands (1)
- Brunei (1)
- Bulgaria (22)
- Burkina Faso (2)
- Burundi (6)
- Cambodia (2)
- Cameroon (11)
- Canada (36)
- Cape Verde (2)
- Cayman Islands (2)
- Central African Republic (2)
- Chad (2)
- Chile (7)
- China (26)
- Chinese Taipei (2)
- Colombia (11)
- Comoros (2)
- Republic of the Congo (2)
- Cook Islands (1)
- Costa Rica (1)
- Ivory Coast (8)
- Croatia (15)
- Cuba (33)
- Cyprus (10)
- Czech Republic (24)
- Denmark (4)
- Democratic Republic of the Congo (2)
- Djibouti (2)
- Dominica (2)
- Dominican Republic (2)
- Ecuador (3)
- Egypt (2)
- El Salvador (2)
- Equatorial Guinea (2)
- Eritrea (3)
- Estonia (5)
- Ethiopia (24)
- Fiji (1)
- Finland (23)
- France (53)
- Gabon (2)
- The Gambia (2)
- Georgia (2)
- Germany (64)
- Ghana (18)
- Great Britain (72)
- Greece (43)
- Grenada (2)
- Guam (2)
- Guatemala (7)
- Guinea (2)
- Guinea-Bissau (2)
- Guyana (4)
- Haiti (3)
- Honduras (1)
- Hong Kong (5)
- Hungary (37)
- Iceland (6)
- India (24)
- Individual Olympic Athletes (2)
- Indonesia (5)
- Iran (1)
- Iraq (2)
- Ireland (32)
- Israel (8)
- Italy (47)
- Jamaica (43)
- Japan (40)
- Jordan (2)
- Kazakhstan (25)
- Kenya (36)
- Kuwait (4)
- Kyrgyzstan (8)
- Laos (2)
- Latvia (17)
- Lebanon (2)
- Lesotho (2)
- Liberia (8)
- Libya (1)
- Lithuania (18)
- Macedonia (2)
- Madagascar (7)
- Malaysia (2)
- Malawi (2)
- Maldives (2)
- Mali (2)
- Malta (2)
- Mauritania (2)
- Mauritius (6)
- Mexico (22)
- Federated States of Micronesia (2)
- Moldova (11)
- Mongolia (2)
- Morocco (24)
- Mozambique (2)
- Myanmar (2)
- Namibia (6)
- Nepal (2)
- Netherlands (9)
- Netherlands Antilles (2)
- Nicaragua (1)
- Niger (2)
- Nigeria (28)
- New Zealand (8)
- North Korea (6)
- Norway (12)
- Oman (4)
- Pakistan (2)
- Palau (2)
- Palestine (1)
- Panama (1)
- Papua New Guinea (2)
- Paraguay (2)
- Peru (2)
- Philippines (2)
- Poland (35)
- Portugal (21)
- Puerto Rico (8)
- Qatar (12)
- Romania (23)
- Russia (109)
- Rwanda (3)
- Saint Kitts and Nevis (2)
- Saint Lucia (3)
- Saint Vincent and the Grenadines (2)
- San Marino (1)
- São Tomé and Príncipe (2)
- Saudi Arabia (11)
- Senegal (9)
- Seychelles (2)
- Sierra Leone (2)
- Slovakia (16)
- Slovenia (19)
- Solomon Islands (2)
- Somalia (2)
- South Africa (23)
- South Korea (13)
- Spain (58)
- Sri Lanka (13)
- Sudan (2)
- Suriname (2)
- Swaziland (2)
- Sweden (14)
- Switzerland (13)
- Syria (3)
- Tajikistan (2)
- Tanzania (4)
- Thailand (12)
- Trinidad and Tobago (15)
- Togo (2)
- Tonga (2)
- Tunisia (9)
- Turkey (5)
- Turkmenistan (2)
- Uganda (5)
- Ukraine (54)
- United Arab Emirates (1)
- United States (116)
- Uruguay (4)
- Uzbekistan (22)
- Vanuatu (2)
- Venezuela (6)
- Vietnam (2)
- Virgin Islands (3)
- Yemen (2)
- FR Yugoslavia (24)
- Zambia (4)
- Zimbabwe (8)

== Medal summary ==
=== Men ===
Games	Gold		Silver		Bronze	
100 metres	Maurice Greene; United States	9.87	Ato Boldon; Trinidad and Tobago	9.99	Obadele Thompson; Barbados	10.04
200 metres	Konstantinos Kenteris; Greece	20.09	Darren Campbell; Great Britain	20.14	Ato Boldon; Trinidad and Tobago	20.20
400 metres	Michael Johnson; United States	43.84	Alvin Harrison; United States	44.40	Greg Haughton; Jamaica	44.70
800 metres	Nils Schumann; Germany	1:45.08	Wilson Kipketer; Denmark	1:45.14	Djabir Saïd-Guerni; Algeria	1:45.16
1500 metres	Noah Ngeny; Kenya	3:32.07 (OR)	Hicham El Guerrouj; Morocco	3:32.32	Bernard Lagat; Kenya	3:32.44
5000 metres	Million Wolde; Ethiopia	13:35.49	Ali Saïdi-Sief; Algeria	13:36.20	Brahim Lahlafi; Morocco	13:36.47
10,000 metres	Haile Gebrselassie; Ethiopia	27:18.20	Paul Tergat; Kenya	27:18.29	Assefa Mezgebu; Ethiopia	27:19.75
110 metres hurdles	Anier García; Cuba	13.00	Terrence Trammell; United States	13.16	Mark Crear; United States	13.22
400 metres hurdles	Angelo Taylor; United States	47.50	Hadi Al-Somaily; Saudi Arabia	47.53	Llewellyn Herbert; South Africa	47.81
3000 metres steeplechase	Reuben Kosgei; Kenya	8:21.43	Wilson Boit Kipketer; Kenya	8:21.77	Ali Ezzine; Morocco	8:22.15
4 × 100 metres relay	United States; Jon Drummond; Bernard Williams; Brian Lewis; Maurice Greene; Tim Montgomery*; Kenneth Brokenburr*	37.61	Brazil; Vicente Lenilson; Édson Ribeiro; André da Silva; Claudinei Quirino; Cláudio Souza*	37.90	Cuba; Luis Alberto Pérez-Rionda; Ivan García; Freddy Mayola; José Ángel César	38.04
4 × 400 metres relay	Nigeria; Clement Chukwu; Jude Monye; Sunday Bada; Enefiok Udo-Obong; Nduka Awazie*; Fidelis Gadzama*	2:58.68	Jamaica; Michael Blackwood; Greg Haughton; Christopher Williams; Danny McFarlane; Sanjay Ayre*; Michael McDonald*	2:58.78	Bahamas; Avard Moncur; Troy McIntosh; Carl Oliver; Chris Brown; Timothy Munnings*	2:59.23
Marathon	Gezahegne Abera; Ethiopia	2:10:11	Erick Wainaina; Kenya	2:10:31	Tesfaye Tola; Ethiopia	2:11:10
20 kilometres walk	Robert Korzeniowski; Poland	1:18:59 (OR)	Noé Hernández; Mexico	1:19:03	Vladimir Andreyev; Russia	1:19:27
50 kilometres walk	Robert Korzeniowski; Poland	3:42:22	Aigars Fadejevs; Latvia	3:43:40	Joel Sánchez Guerrero; Mexico	3:44:36
High jump	Sergey Klyugin; Russia	2.35 m	Javier Sotomayor; Cuba	2.32 m	Abderrahmane Hammad; Algeria	2.32 m
Pole vault	Nick Hysong; United States	5.90 m	Lawrence Johnson; United States	5.90 m	Maksim Tarasov; Russia	5.90 m
Long jump	Iván Pedroso; Cuba	8.55 m	Jai Taurima; Australia	8.49 m	Roman Shchurenko; Ukraine	8.31 m
Triple jump	Jonathan Edwards; Great Britain	17.71 m	Yoel García; Cuba	17.47 m	Denis Kapustin; Russia	17.46 m
Shot put	Arsi Harju; Finland	21.29 m	Adam Nelson; United States	21.21 m	John Godina; United States	21.20 m
Discus throw	Virgilijus Alekna; Lithuania	69.30 m	Lars Riedel; Germany	68.50 m	Frantz Kruger; South Africa	68.19 m
Hammer throw	Szymon Ziółkowski; Poland	80.02 m	Nicola Vizzoni; Italy	79.64 m	Igor Astapkovich; Belarus	79.17 m
Javelin throw	Jan Železný; Czech Republic	90.17 m (OR)	Steve Backley; Great Britain	89.85 m	Sergey Makarov; Russia	88.67 m
Decathlon	Erki Nool; Estonia	8642	Roman Šebrle; Czech Republic	8606	Chris Huffins; United States	8595

* Athletes who participated in the heats only and received medals.

=== Women ===
Games	Gold		Silver		Bronze	
100 metres	Not awarded		Ekaterini Thanou; Greece	11.12	Merlene Ottey; Jamaica	11.19
100 metres	Not awarded		Tayna Lawrence; Jamaica	11.18	Merlene Ottey; Jamaica	11.19
200 metres	Pauline Davis-Thompson; Bahamas	22.27	Susanthika Jayasinghe; Sri Lanka	22.28 (NR)	Beverly McDonald; Jamaica	22.35
400 metres	Cathy Freeman; Australia	49.11	Lorraine Graham; Jamaica	49.58	Katharine Merry; Great Britain	49.72
800 metres	Maria de Lurdes Mutola; Mozambique	1:56.15	Stephanie Graf; Austria	1:56.64	Kelly Holmes; Great Britain	1:56.80
1500 metres	Nouria Mérah-Benida; Algeria	4:05.10	Violeta Beclea; Romania	4:05.15	Gabriela Szabo; Romania	4:05.27
5000 metres	Gabriela Szabo; Romania	14:40.79 (OR)	Sonia O'Sullivan; Ireland	14:41.02 (NR)	Gete Wami; Ethiopia	14:42.23
10,000 metres	Derartu Tulu; Ethiopia	30:17.49 (OR)	Gete Wami; Ethiopia	30:22.48	Fernanda Ribeiro; Portugal	30:22.88 (NR)
100 metres hurdles	Olga Shishigina; Kazakhstan	12.65	Glory Alozie; Nigeria	12.68	Melissa Morrison; United States	12.76
400 metres hurdles	Irina Privalova; Russia	53.02	Deon Hemmings; Jamaica	53.45	Nezha Bidouane; Morocco	53.57
4 × 100 metres relay	Bahamas; Savatheda Fynes; Chandra Sturrup; Pauline Davis-Thompson; Debbie Ferguson; Eldece Lewis*	41.95	Jamaica; Tayna Lawrence; Veronica Campbell; Beverly McDonald; Merlene Ottey; Merlene Frazer*	42.13	United States; Chryste Gaines; Torri Edwards; Nanceen Perry; Passion Richardson*	42.20
4 × 400 metres relay	United States; Jearl Miles Clark; Monique Hennagan; LaTasha Colander; Andrea Anderson*	3:22.62	Jamaica; Sandie Richards; Catherine Scott; Deon Hemmings; Lorraine Graham; Charmaine Howell*; Michelle Burgher*	3:23.25	Russia; Yuliya Sotnikova; Svetlana Goncharenko; Olga Kotlyarova; Irina Privalova; Natalya Nazarova*; Olesya Zykina*	3:23.46
Marathon	Naoko Takahashi; Japan	2:23:14 (OR)	Lidia Șimon; Romania	2:23:22	Joyce Chepchumba; Kenya	2:24:45
20 kilometres walk	Wang Liping; China	1:29:05 (OR)	Kjersti Plätzer; Norway	1:29:33	María Vasco; Spain	1:30:23
High jump	Yelena Yelesina; Russia	2.01 m	Hestrie Cloete; South Africa	2.01 m	Kajsa Bergqvist; Sweden	1.99 m
High jump	Yelena Yelesina; Russia	2.01 m	Hestrie Cloete; South Africa	2.01 m	Oana Pantelimon; Romania	1.99 m
Pole vault	Stacy Dragila; United States	4.60 m (OR)	Tatiana Grigorieva; Australia	4.55 m	Vala Flosadóttir; Iceland	4.50 m
Long jump	Heike Drechsler; Germany	6.99 m	Fiona May; Italy	6.92 m	Tatyana Kotova; Russia	6.83 m
Triple jump	Tereza Marinova; Bulgaria	15.20 m	Tatyana Lebedeva; Russia	15.00 m	Olena Hovorova; Ukraine	14.96 m
Shot put	Yanina Karolchik; Belarus	20.56 m	Larisa Peleshenko; Russia	19.92 m	Astrid Kumbernuss; Germany	19.62 m
Discus throw	Ellina Zvereva; Belarus	68.40 m	Anastasía Kelesídou; Greece	65.71 m	Iryna Yatchenko; Belarus	65.20 m
Hammer throw	Kamila Skolimowska; Poland	71.16 m	Olga Kuzenkova; Russia	69.77 m	Kirsten Münchow; Germany	69.28 m
Javelin throw	Trine Hattestad; Norway	68.91 m (OR)	Mirela Maniani-Tzelili; Greece	67.51 m	Osleidys Menéndez; Cuba	66.18 m
Heptathlon	Denise Lewis; Great Britain	6584	Yelena Prokhorova; Russia	6531	Natallia Sazanovich; Belarus	6527

* Athletes who participated in the heats only and received medals.

== See also ==
- 2000 in athletics (track and field)
- Athletics at the 2000 Summer Olympics – Qualification
- Athletics at the 2000 Summer Paralympics
