= Swimming at the 1996 Summer Olympics – Men's 50 metre freestyle =

Men's 50 metre freestyle at the Games of the XXVI Olympiad
- Venue: Georgia Tech Aquatic Center
- Date: 25 July 1996 (heats & finals)
- Competitors: 65 from 59 nations
- Winning time: 22.13

Medalists
1st place, gold medalist(s)		Alexander Popov	Russia
2nd place, silver medalist(s)		Gary Hall Jr.	United States
3rd place, bronze medalist(s)		Fernando Scherer	Brazil

The men's 50 metre freestyle event at the 1996 Summer Olympics took place on 25 July at the Georgia Tech Aquatic Center in Atlanta, United States.

== Records ==
Prior to this competition, the existing world and Olympic records were as follows.

World record	Tom Jager (USA)	21.81	Nashville, United States	24 March 1990
Olympic record	Alexander Popov (EUN)	21.91	Barcelona, Spain	30 July 1992

== Competition format ==
The competition consisted of two rounds: heats and finals. The swimmers with the best 8 times in the heats advanced to final A, where they competed for the top 8 places. The swimmers with the next 8 times in the heats swam in final B, for ninth through the sixteenth place. Swim-offs were used as necessary to determine advancement.

== Results ==
=== Heats ===
Rule: The eight fastest swimmers advance to final A (Q), while the next eight to final B (q).

Rank	Heat	Lane	Name	Nationality	Time	Notes
1	9	4	Alexander Popov	Russia	22.22	Q
2	8	4	Gary Hall, Jr.	United States	22.36	Q
3	7	1	Jiang Chengji	China	22.55	Q, AS
4	8	2	Brendon Dedekind	South Africa	22.60	Q
5	6	1	Ricardo Busquets	Puerto Rico	22.61	Q, NR
6	9	5	David Fox	United States	22.64	Q
7	7	3	Bengt Zikarsky	Germany	22.68	QSO
7	7	8	Francisco Sánchez	Venezuela	22.68	QSO, NR
7	8	5	Fernando Scherer	Brazil	22.68	QSO
10	8	6	Mark Foster	Great Britain	22.73	q
11	9	8	Allan Murray	Bahamas	22.75	q, NR
12	8	1	Yuriy Vlasov	Ukraine	22.77	q
13	9	2	Pieter van den Hoogenband	Netherlands	22.82	q
14	8	3	Christophe Kalfayan	France	22.83	q
15	7	6	René Gusperti	Italy	22.85	q
16	9	3	Gustavo Borges	Brazil	22.86	q
17	7	2	Pavlo Khnykin	Ukraine	22.91	
18	7	7	Raimundas Mažuolis	Lithuania	22.98	
18	9	6	Chris Fydler	Australia	22.98	
20	8	7	Vladimir Predkin	Russia	23.03	
21	7	5	Alexander Lüderitz	Germany	23.06	
22	9	1	Aleh Rukhlevich	Belarus	23.12	
23	7	4	José Meolans	Argentina	23.21	
24	9	7	Yoav Bruck	Israel	23.22	
25	6	4	Felipe Delgado	Ecuador	23.26	
26	6	2	Sergey Borisenko	Kazakhstan	23.29	
26	6	8	Indrek Sei	Estonia	23.29	NR
28	6	7	Bartosz Kizierowski	Poland	23.34	
29	5	5	Sion Brinn	Jamaica	23.35	NR
30	6	6	Juan Benavides	Spain	23.36	
31	5	8	Stavros Michaelides	Cyprus	23.37	
32	5	6	Enrico Linscheer	Suriname	23.45	
33	6	3	Pär Lindström	Sweden	23.47	
34	6	5	Georgios Giziotis	Greece	23.56	
35	4	8	Yukihiro Matsushita	Japan	23.60	
36	4	4	Salim Iles	Algeria	23.61	NR
36	4	5	Janne Blomqvist	Finland	23.61	
36	8	8	Dzmitry Kalinouski	Belarus	23.61	
39	5	4	Hugues Legault	Canada	23.63	
40	3	3	Nicholas Tongue	New Zealand	23.73	
40	5	1	Paulo Trindade	Portugal	23.73	
42	3	4	Arthur Li Kai Yien	Hong Kong	23.77	
43	3	5	Maxim Cazmirciuc	Moldova	23.78	
44	5	7	Richard Sam Bera	Indonesia	23.80	
45	4	3	Ravil Nachaev	Uzbekistan	23.93	
46	3	6	Darrick Bollinger	Guam	23.97	
47	4	6	Tamer Hamed	Egypt	24.02	
48	5	3	Nicholas O'Hare	Ireland	24.03	
49	4	7	Sebastian Xavier	India	24.15	
50	4	2	Alen Lončar	Croatia	24.17	
51	3	2	Kaan Berberoğlu	Turkey	24.37	
52	4	1	Vitaly Vasilyev	Kyrgyzstan	24.54	
53	2	6	Khemo Rivera	Virgin Islands	24.62	NR
54	2	3	Howard Hinds	Netherlands Antilles	24.63	
55	3	1	Tamás Kerékjártó	Hungary	24.67	
56	2	5	Huang Chih-yung	Chinese Taipei	24.89	
57	2	2	Alfredo Carrillo	Paraguay	24.91	
58	3	8	Sng Ju Wei	Singapore	25.04	
59	3	7	Emin Guliyev	Azerbaijan	25.23	
60	1	4	Woodrow Lawrence	Dominica	27.88	
61	1	5	Moosa Nazim	Maldives	28.37	
62	1	3	René Makosso	Republic of the Congo	30.00	
63	2	1	Michael Collier	Sierra Leone	34.21	
	5	2	Alexandru Ioanovici	Romania	DSQ	
	2	4	Musa Bakare	Nigeria	DNS	

=== Swim-off ===
Rank	Lane	Name	Nationality	Time	Notes
1	3	Fernando Scherer	Brazil	22.71	Q
2	5	Francisco Sánchez	Venezuela	22.74	Q
	4	Bengt Zikarsky	Germany	DSQ	q

=== Finals ===
==== Final B ====
Rank	Lane	Name	Nationality	Time	Notes
9	2	Pieter van den Hoogenband	Netherlands	22.67	NR
10	4	Bengt Zikarsky	Germany	22.73	
11	6	Yuriy Vlasov	Ukraine	22.82	
12	3	Allan Murray	Bahamas	22.92	
12	8	Gustavo Borges	Brazil	22.92	
14	1	René Gusperti	Italy	22.96	
14	7	Christophe Kalfayan	France	22.96	
16	5	Mark Foster	Great Britain	23.01	

==== Final A ====
Rank	Lane	Name	Nationality	Time	Notes
1st place, gold medalist(s)	4	Alexander Popov	Russia	22.13	
2nd place, silver medalist(s)	5	Gary Hall, Jr.	United States	22.26	
3rd place, bronze medalist(s)	1	Fernando Scherer	Brazil	22.29	SA
4	3	Jiang Chengji	China	22.33	AS
5	6	Brendon Dedekind	South Africa	22.59	
6	7	David Fox	United States	22.68	
7	8	Francisco Sánchez	Venezuela	22.72	
8	2	Ricardo Busquets	Puerto Rico	22.73	
