= Zurab Beridze =

Georgian swimmer (born 1979)

Personal information
- National team: Georgia
- Born: 9 January 1979 (age 47) Tbilisi, Georgian SSR, Soviet Union

Sport
- Sport: Swimming
- Strokes: Freestyle
- College team: Western Illinois Leathernecks (USA)
- Coach: Jerry Champer (USA)

Zurab Beridze (Georgian: ზურაბ ბერიძე; born 9 January 1979) is a Georgian former swimmer, who specialized in sprint freestyle events. After Georgia gained its independence from the Soviet Union in the early 1990s, Beridze became the first ever swimmer in history to represent his nation at the 2000 Summer Olympics. While studying in the United States, he held the 50-yard freestyle time (20.89), the second fastest in school's record books, and also played for the Western Illinois University's swimming and diving team under head coach Jerry Champer.

Beridze competed only in the men's 50 m freestyle at the 2000 Summer Olympics in Sydney. Despite finishing among the top 25 swimmers from the European Championships in Helsinki, Finland, he received a ticket from FINA, under a Universality program, in an entry time of 24.13. He challenged seven other swimmers in heat three, including two-time Olympians Howard Hinds of the Netherlands Antilles and Emin Guliyev of Azerbaijan. Racing on the outside lane, he faded down the stretch to pick up a third seed in 24.28, a small fraction outside his entry standard. Beridze failed to advance into the semifinals, as he placed fifty-fourth overall in the prelims.
