= Rodrigo Olivares =

Chilean swimmer

Personal information
- Full name: Rodrigo Olivares Aramburu
- National team: Chile
- Born: 31 July 1976 (age 49) Santiago, Chile
- Height: 1.96 m (6 ft 5 in)
- Weight: 82 kg (181 lb)

Sport
- Sport: Swimming
- Strokes: Freestyle

Rodrigo Olivares Aramburu (born July 31, 1976, in Santiago) is a retired Chilean swimmer, who specialized in sprint freestyle events. Olivares competed only in a sprint freestyle at the 2000 Summer Olympics in Sydney. He achieved FINA B-standards of 23.32 (50 m freestyle) and 52.31 (100 m freestyle) from the Pan American Games in Winnipeg, Manitoba, Canada. In the 100 m freestyle, Olivares placed sixty-two on the morning prelims. Swimming in heat five, he rounded out the field to last place by almost a full second behind Zimbabwe's Glen Walshaw in 53.50. Two days later, in the 50 m freestyle, Olivares participated in heat five against seven other swimmers, including three-time Olympians Richard Sam Bera of Indonesia and Allan Murray of the Bahamas, top 16 finalist in Atlanta four years earlier. Failing to improve his standard, he settled only for seventh place and fifty-fifth overall in 54.50, a 1.38-second deficit behind winner Ravil Nachaev of Uzbekistan.
