= Beridze =

Beridze (Georgian: ბერიძე) is a Georgian surname. It is the most common surname in Georgia. Notable people with the surname include:

- Avtandil Beridze (1955–2020), Georgian politician
- Giorgi Beridze (born 1997), Georgian soccer player
- Tengiz Beridze (1939–2024), Georgian biochemist
- Zurab Beridze (swimmer) (born 1979), Georgian swimmer
- Zurab Beridze (diplomat) (born 1958), Georgian diplomat
- Levan Beridze, Georgian swimmer and diplomat
