= Emin Guliyev =

Emin Guliyev may refer to:

- Emin Quliyev (born 1977), former Azerbaijani football player and now coach
- Emin Guliyev (swimmer) (born 1975), retired Azerbaijani swimmer
