= Ayoub Al-Mas =

Emirati swimmer

Personal information
- Full name: Ayoub Al-Mas
- National team: Emirati
- Born: 15 December 1978 (age 47)
- Height: 1.80 m (5 ft 11 in)
- Weight: 67 kg (148 lb)

Sport
- Sport: Swimming
- Strokes: Freestyle

Ayoub Al-Mas (Arabic: أيوب الماس; born December 15, 1978) is an Emirati former swimmer, who specialized in sprint freestyle events. Al-Mas competed for the United Arab Emirates in the men's 50 m freestyle at the 2000 Summer Olympics in Sydney. He received a ticket from FINA, under a Universality program, in an entry time of 24.11. He challenged seven other swimmers in heat three, including two-time Olympians Howard Hinds of the Netherlands Antilles and Emin Guliyev of Azerbaijan. Racing on the outside lane, he faded down the stretch to pick up a fourth seed in 24.91, a small fraction outside his entry standard. Al-Mas failed to advance into the semifinals, as he placed fifty-sixth overall in the prelims.
