= Ilidio Matusse =

Mozambican swimmer

Personal information
- Full name: Ilidio Salvador Matusse
- National team: Mozambique
- Born: 12 August 1975 (age 50) Maputo, Mozambique
- Height: 1.75 m (5 ft 9 in)
- Weight: 68 kg (150 lb)

Sport
- Sport: Swimming
- Strokes: Freestyle

Ilidio Salvador Matusse (born August 12, 1975) is a Mozambican former swimmer, who specialized in sprint freestyle events. Matusse competed for Mozambique in the men's 50 m freestyle at the 2000 Summer Olympics in Sydney. He received a ticket from FINA, under a Universality program, in an entry time of 25.51. He challenged seven other swimmers in heat two, including teenagers Khalid Al-Kulaibi of Oman (aged 14) and Sikhounxay Ounkhamphanyavong of Laos (aged 17). He faded down the stretch of the race to take a fourth spot in 26.28, 77-hundredths of a second below his entry standard. Matusse failed to advance into the semifinals, as he placed sixty-fifth overall out of 80 swimmers in the prelims.
