= Nebojša Bikić =

Serbian swimmer (born 1975)

Personal information
- Full name: Nebojša Bikić
- National team: Yugoslavia
- Born: 1 July 1975 (age 51) Belgrade, SR Serbia, SFR Yugoslavia
- Height: 2.00 m (6 ft 7 in)
- Weight: 90 kg (198 lb)

Sport
- Sport: Swimming
- Strokes: Freestyle
- Club: PK 11 April

Nebojša Bikić (Serbian: Небојша Бикић; born July 1, 1975) is a Serbian former swimmer, who specialized in sprint freestyle events. He is a single-time Olympian (2000), a former Serbian record holder in the 50 and 100 m freestyle, and a resident athlete for the April 11 Swimming Club.

Bikic competed in the men's 50 m freestyle, as a member of the former Yugoslavian squad, at the 2000 Summer Olympics in Sydney. He posted a FINA B-standard entry time of 23.55 from the Serbian Open in Belgrade. He challenged seven other swimmers in heat five, including three-time Olympians Allan Murray of the Bahamas and top favorite Richard Sam Bera of Indonesia. He raced to fourth place by a hundredth of a second (0.01) behind Bera in 23.57. Bikic failed to advance into the semifinals, as he placed forty-third overall in the preliminaries.

Since 2005, Bikic currently resides in the United States, where he works as a manager for St. Mary's Center of Health & Fitness in Reno, Nevada.
