= Make Me a Supermodel (Australian TV series) =

- Genre: Reality
- Presented by: Jennifer Hawkins; Tyson Beckford
- Judges: Martin Walsh; Jackie Frank
- Opening theme: The Fame by Lady Gaga
- Country of origin: Australia
- Original language: English
- No. of seasons: 1
- No. of episodes: 15

Original release
- Network: Seven Network
- Release: 6 August – 20 November 2008

Related
- Make Me a Supermodel (British TV series); Make Me a Supermodel (American TV series)

Make Me a Supermodel is an Australian reality television series based on the British TV series of the same title. It debuted on the Seven Network on 6 August 2008 and was hosted by the former Miss Universe winner Jennifer Hawkins.

The judges for the program were Martin Walsh, managing director of Chadwick Models, and Jackie Frank, editor of the fashion magazine Marie Claire. Tyson Beckford, the co-host of the American edition, was a guest judge and mentor for the first few episodes whilst Travis Fimmel turned down being a judge for the program.

It was also announced that Tyson Beckford "finished up his MMAS duties after the second episode and may return sometime in the future." He did not return afterward.

The winner of the competition, chosen by the viewers, would receive a fashion pictorial in Marie Claire magazine, a one-year contract with Chadwick Models, and a trip to New York City to meet with New York Model Management.

The winner of the first and only series was Rhys Uhlich, who beat out runner-up Shanina Shaik and second runner-up Courtney Chircop.

The series was not renewed for a second season.

== Auditions ==
Auditions for the program were held from 14 June to 6 July at:

- Mercure Hotel Sydney, George Street, Sydney, New South Wales on 14 June
- The Sebel, Church Street, Parramatta, New South Wales on 15 June
- Mercure Grosvenor Hotel Adelaide, North Terrace, Adelaide, South Australia, on
- Gold Coast International Hotel, Staghorn Avenue, Surfers Paradise, Queensland on 21 June
- Mercure Hotel Brisbane, North Quay, Brisbane, Queensland on 22 June
- Claremont Showground, Perth, Western Australia on 26 June
- Holiday Inn Esplanade Darwin, The Esplanade, Darwin, Northern Territory on 28 June
- Mercure Hotel Hobart, Bathurst Street, Hobart, Tasmania on 3 July
- Novotel Melbourne on Collins, Collins Street, Melbourne, Victoria on 5 July
- Frankston Arts Centre, Cnr Davey & Young Streets, Frankston, Victoria on 6 July

== Background ==
The show went through an auditioning period where the top 40 contestants were chosen. From there the top 40 were sent to a two-day 'Supermodel Crash-Course,' where they were narrowed down to the top 14. From there the supermodel lifestyle began. The weekly agenda was as follows.

- Thursday - The show airs and the Bottom 3 are revealed to Australia, so that votes can be made to save their favorite competitor.
- Friday - Morning - "Elimination Day," after votes are tallied bottom 3 are gathered and the eliminated contestant notified. Afternoon - Models take on first challenge of the new week, e.g. Speed dating or dancing lessons
- Saturday - Photo shoot is taken
- Sunday - Catwalk training
- Monday - Catwalk day as well as notification to models of top 3 and bottom 4
- Tuesday - "Off the Runway" show aired until second of October 2008

And the cycle went on until 3 models remained.

== Seasons ==
Season	Premiere date	Winner	Runner-Up	Contestants (in order of elimination)	Number of contestants
1	6 August 2008	Rhys Uhlich	Shanina Shaik	Bakary Sereme, Brooke Greentree, Kassandra Zandt, Lucas Williams, Sheridan Seekamp, Luke Quill, Isaac Keenan, Sara Longman, Hannah McCarthy, Billy Bishop, Tom Penfold, Courtney Chircop	14

== Episodes ==
A Nationwide Audition episode and a Top 40 episode were aired prior to the 2008 Beijing Summer Olympic Games, these episodes are not included in the Photo or Catwalk guide as no official task was set.

== Contestants ==
(ages stated are at time of contest)

Contestant	Age	Hometown	Outcome	Place
Bakary Sereme	27	Melbourne, Victoria	Episode 3	14
Brooke Greentree	20	Sydney, New South Wales	Episode 4	13
Kassandra Zandt	18	Brisbane, Queensland	Episode 5	12
Lucas Williams	22	Melbourne, Victoria	Episode 6	11 (Quit)
Sheridan Seekamp	18	Adelaide, South Australia	Episode 7	10
Luke Quill	18	Perth, Western Australia	Episode 8	9
Isaac Keenan	22	Melbourne, Victoria	Episode 9	8
Sara Longman	17	Darwin, Northern Territory	Episode 10	7
Hannah McCarthy	19	Sydney, New South Wales	Episode 11	6
Billy Bishop	20	Brisbane, Queensland	Episode 12	5
Tom Penfold	19	Sydney, New South Wales	Episode 13	4
Courtney Chircop	18	Perth, Western Australia	Episode 15	3
Shanina Shaik	17	Melbourne, Victoria	Episode 15	2
Rhys Uhlich	25	Melbourne, Victoria	Episode 15	1

== Result history ==
Model Elimination Progress
Place	Model	Episodes													Challenge Theme
Place	Model	3	4	5	6	7	8	9	10	11	12	13	14	15	Challenge Theme
1	Rhys	HIGH	SAFE	SAFE	SAFE	HIGH	BTM 3	BTM 2	WIN	BTM 3	BTM 3	WIN	FINALIST	WINNER	No Challenge Theme
2	Shanina	WIN	HIGH	SAFE	SAFE	SAFE	WIN	HIGH	LOW	HIGH	HIGH	BTM 2	FINALIST	OUT	No Challenge Theme
3	Courtney	SAFE	LOW	WIN	HIGH	BTM 3	SAFE	SAFE	BTM 3	BTM 3	BTM 2	BTM 3	FINALIST	OUT	No Challenge Theme
4	Tom	SAFE	HIGH	SAFE	SAFE	WIN	HIGH	WIN	HIGH	WIN	LOW	OUT			Spring Racing Carnival
5	Billy	SAFE	SAFE	HIGH	SAFE	SAFE	SAFE	LOW	BTM 3	LOW	OUT				New Heights
6	Hannah	SAFE	SAFE	SAFE	WIN	SAFE	HIGH	HIGH	HIGH	OUT					Selling the Brand
7	Sara	BTM 2	WIN	LOW	BTM 3	BTM 2	LOW	BTM 3	OUT						Keeping Focus
8	Isaac	BTM 3	BTM 3	BTM 3	LOW	HIGH	BTM 3	OUT							Dance and Motion
9	Luke	HIGH	SAFE	BTM 2	HIGH	LOW	OUT								Sexual Chemistry
10	Sheridan	SAFE	SAFE	SAFE	BTM 3	OUT									Speed And Motion
11	Lucas	LOW	BTM 2	HIGH	QUIT										Acting Up
12	Kassandra	SAFE	SAFE	OUT											Naked Art
13	Brooke	SAFE	OUT												Unglamorous Glamour
14	Bakary	OUT													Summer Chic, Mid-Winter

Cornflower Blue background and WIN means the model won the challenge.
Light blue background and HIGH means the model had one of the highest scores for that challenge.
Pink background and LOW means the model had one of the lowest scores for that challenge, but was not in the bottom three.
Orange background and BTM 3 means the model was in the bottom three, and may have been given another chance by Australia to stay in the competition.
Tomato background and OUT means the model was in the bottom three, but was not given another chance by Australia, and was sent home.
Crimson background means the model quit the competition.
Light Green background and FINALIST means the Final 3 were placed in the hands of Australia to make one of the three a Supermodel.
Yellow Green background and OUT means the model was a runner-up for the competition.
Lime Green background and WINNER means this model won the entire competition, and was voted by Australia to become a Supermodel.

- In Episode 4, there was no bottom two because Lucas announced that he was quitting the competition; Australia's vote was not announced.
- In Episode 10, there was no announced winner. Also, Tom and Billy had a walk off to decide the last member of the bottom three.

== Summaries ==
=== Photo shoot guide ===
- Episode 1: Models posed with birds of prey to sell summer clothing on the Central Coast of New South Wales in the middle of winter.
- Episode 2: A high fashion photo shoot in the highly unglamorous environment of a fish processing plant.
- Episode 3: A ten-minute still posing as nude models for an art class; group shots with one starring model among two supporting models, and vice versa; then, getting full body paint to act as a group for a living art installation at Melbourne's Federation Square.
- Episode 4: The use of emotions and body language to act out a scene; done in groups of two and three.
- Episode 5: The models needed to "capture the moment" and bring the clothes to life by making shapes while jumping on a trampoline and posing in mid air.
- Episode 6: Models teamed up in groups of two and took one shot each (Shanina Shaik had two shots) in the theme of 'sexual chemistry' with their partner.
- Episode 7: Models again teamed up in groups of two and engaged in the tango while the photographer took photos of them in action.
- Episode 8: Models are submerged under water (in a tank) and have to pose with an albino python.
- Episode 9: Models pose in top brand name underwear Loveable and Van Huesen.
- Episode 10: Models posed while suspended in the air.
- Episode 11: Posing with a black stallion in equestrian clothing
- Episode 12: The models portrayed the element that best represented them. Rhys - Fire. Shanina Shaik - Water, Courtney - Wind.
- The Finale: The Finale featured no photo shoot but had the finalists spend the day working on a real runway show (Rhys and Courtney), and shooting a national campaign for General Pants Co. (Shanina Shaik).

=== Catwalk challenge guide ===
- Episode 1: High fashion swimwear.
- Episode 2: Supermodel Rockstars.
- Episode 3: Model's had to carry themselves as walking sculptures.
- Episode 4: Walking in pairs (or solo in Hannah's case), while performing a story based on characters they have selected.
- Episode 5: Wearing 60's mod-inspired clothes the models walked down the runway leading to a turntable and had to strike different poses as the turntable rotated.
- Episode 6: Models had to display "sexual chemistry" using clothing 'mix and matched' from a Salvation Army Store.
- Episode 7: Models performed a choreographed runway as a group with a theme of movement as shown in their sporting attire.
- Episode 8: Models have to walk in formal wear with a chosen animal.
- Episode 9: Models wore clothes by leading Australian designer Arthur Galan
- Episode 10: Models had to wear a large headpiece (such as a tall hat) on the runway to match the week's theme of 'new heights'.
- Episode 11: Models showcased 'naughty' equestrian clothes.
- Episode 12: The models had to showcase three outfits each with only 3 minutes in between to change, much like a real runway show.
- Episode 13: For the farewell runway walk before the announcement of the series winner the Top 14 models (excluding Lucas) returned for a show in front of a live studio audience. A look back over the journey of the final three was shown before Rhys was announced the winner.

=== Winner's Reward guide ===
- Episode 1: Dinner with supermodel Tyson Beckford.
- Episode 2: A Trip to the races in Melbourne with Jackie Frank.
- Episode 3: A $1000 shopping spree.
- Episode 4: A feature swimwear shoot in FAMOUS magazine.
- Episode 5: Co-hosting a radio show on Sydney's NovaFM.
- Episode 6: Due to the cancellation of OFF THE RUNWAY after Episode 6, the rewards are no longer revealed to the public.
- Episode 9: Top three attended a Pussycat Dolls show.

== Reception ==
=== Viewership ===
Episode		Airdate	Viewers (millions)	Night Rank	Week Rank
1	"Premiere"	6 August 2008	1.065	#13	#46
2	"Top 40"	7 August 2008	1.182	#6	#31
3	"Top 14"	28 August 2008	0.936	#15	#60
4	"Top 13"	4 September 2008	0.928	#16	#60
5	"Top 12"	11 September 2008	1.052	#11	#47
6	"Top 11"	18 September 2008	0.953	#14	#56
7	"Top 10"	25 September 2008	0.927	#12	#60
8	"Top 9"	2 October 2008	0.934	#13	#54
9	"Top 8"	9 October 2008	0.934	#12	#50
10	"Top 7"	16 October 2008	1.042	#9	#39
11	"Top 6"	23 October 2008	0.978	#13	#49
12	"Top 5"	30 October 2008	0.937	#11	#46
13	"Top 4"	6 November 2008	0.985	#8	#41
14	"Top 3"	13 November 2008	0.948	#12	#44
15	"Grand Finale"	20 November 2008	1.158	#8	#29
