= Swimming at the 2000 Summer Olympics – Men's 100 metre freestyle =

Men's 100 metre freestyle at the Games of the XXVII Olympiad
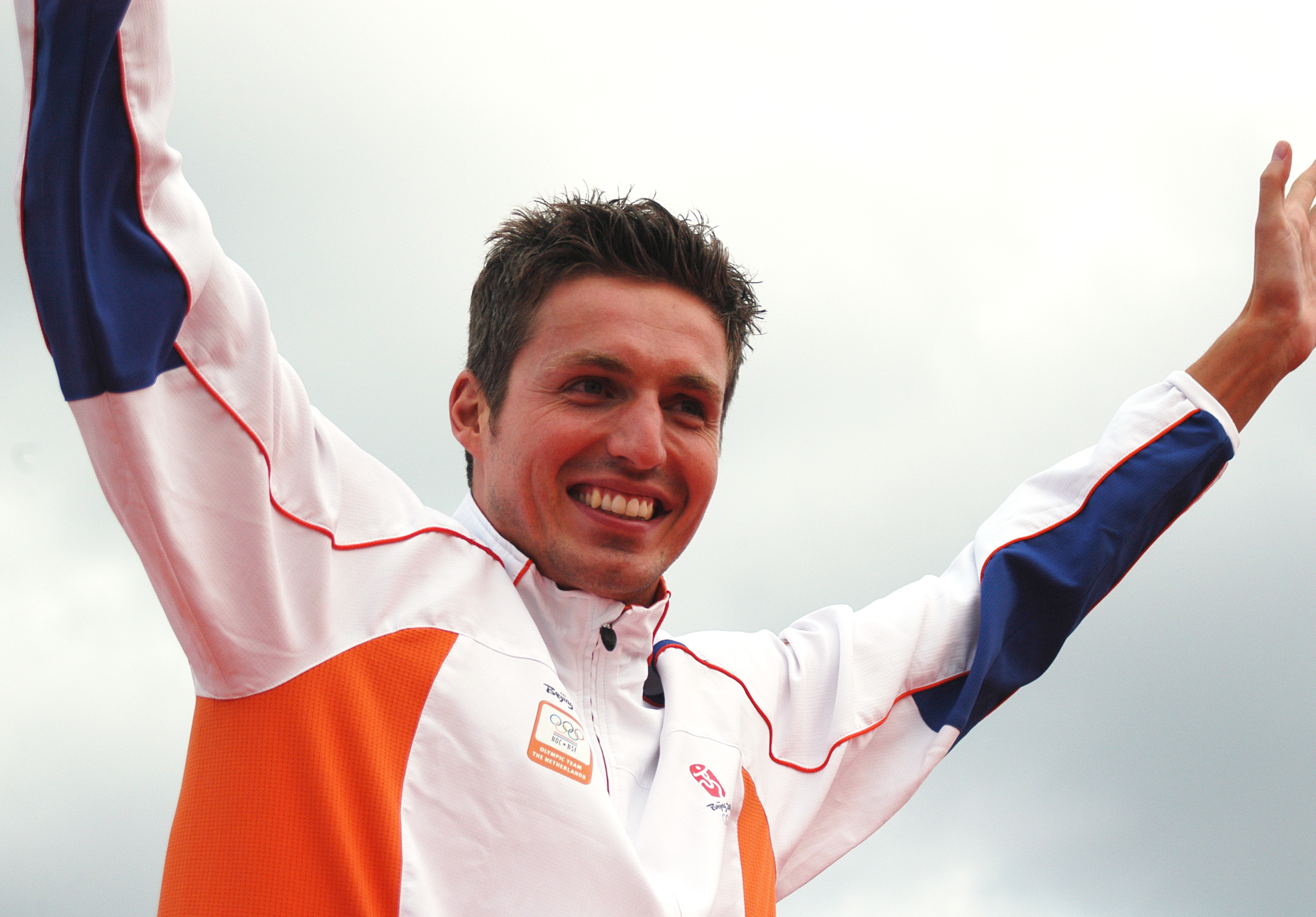
- Pieter van den Hoogenband (2008)
- Venue: Sydney International Aquatic Centre
- Dates: September 19, 2000 (heats & semifinals); September 20, 2000 (final)
- Competitors: 73 from 66 nations
- Winning time: 48.30

Medalists
| 1st place, gold medalist(s) | | Pieter van den Hoogenband; Netherlands |
| 2nd place, silver medalist(s) | | Alexander Popov; Russia |
| 3rd place, bronze medalist(s) | | Gary Hall, Jr. United States |

The men's 100 metre freestyle event at the 2000 Summer Olympics took place on 19–20 September at the Sydney International Aquatic Centre in Sydney, Australia. There were 73 competitors from 66 nations. Nations have been limited to two swimmers each since the 1984 Games.

== Summary ==
Netherlands' Pieter van den Hoogenband stormed home on the final length to claim his second Olympic gold medal at these Games. He posted a time of 48.30 to hold off Russia's defending Olympic champion Alexander Popov by almost two-fifths of a second (0.40). It was the Netherlands' first medal in the men's 100 metre freestyle. Failing to attain a third straight triumph in the same event, Popov settled for the silver in 48.69. Popov became only the second man to win three medals in the 100 metre freestyle, the first since Duke Kahanamoku in 1912–1924. Meanwhile, U.S. swimmer Gary Hall, Jr. took bronze with a 48.73 time. Hall was the 11th man to win two medals in the event.

After breaking a split world record in the 4×100 m freestyle relay on the opening night, Australia's overwhelming favorite Michael Klim missed out the podium in a close race against Hall by a hundredth of a second, finishing with a time of 48.74. Klim was followed in fifth by Hall's teammate Neil Walker (49.09), and in sixth by Sweden's three-time Olympian Lars Frölander (49.22). Russia's Denis Pimankov (49.36) and another Aussie Chris Fydler (49.44) rounded out the finale.

Earlier in the semifinals, Van den Hoogenband cleared a 48-second barrier to set a new world record of 47.84, slashing 0.34 seconds off the mark set by Klim from the relay.

One of the most popular highlights in the event took place in the first heat. Dubbed as Eric the Eel, Equatorial Guinea's Eric Moussambani received a dubious honor of being the slowest Olympic swimmer in history. Two other swimmers, Niger's Karim Bare and Tajikistan's Farkhod Oripov, plunged into the pool and were cast out of the race under a no false-start rule, leaving Moussambani as the last man standing. Cheered by a large crowd, he finished a one-man heat in 1:52.72, nearly seven seconds slower than a winning time by Van den Hoogenband over double the distance a day before.

== Background ==
This was the 23rd appearance of the men's 100 metre freestyle. The event has been held at every Summer Olympics except 1900 (when the shortest freestyle was the 200 metres), though the 1904 version was measured in yards rather than metres.

Seven of the eight finalists from the 1996 Games returned: two-time gold medalist Alexander Popov of Russia, silver medalist Gary Hall, Jr. of the United States, bronze medalist (and 1992 silver medalist) Gustavo Borges of Brazil, fourth-place finisher Pieter van den Hoogenband of the Netherlands, fifth-place finisher Fernando Scherer of Brazil, sixth-place finisher Pavlo Khnykin of Ukraine, and eighth-place finisher Francisco Sánchez of Venezuela.

Popov had recovered from a near-fatal stabbing in 1996 to win the 1997 European championship and repeat as world champion in 1998. His 1994 world record had stood until the start of the Games; in the freestyle relays, however, hometown hopeful Michael Klim (the 1998 world championship runner-up) had broken that record with his first leg split. Van den Hoogenband won the 200 metre freestyle earlier in Sydney.

The Republic of the Congo, the Czech Republic, Equatorial Guinea, the Ivory Coast, Mauritius, Mongolia, Niger, Nigeria, Slovenia, and Tajikistan each made their debut in the event. The United States made its 22nd appearance, most of any nation, having missed only the boycotted 1980 Games.

== Competition format ==
This freestyle swimming competition returned to the three-round format used from 1948 to 1980, abandoning the A/B final format used between 1984 and 1996. The competition consisted of three rounds: heats, semifinals, and a final. The swimmers with the best 16 times in the heats advanced to the semifinals. The swimmers with the best 8 times in the semifinals advanced to the final. Swim-offs were used as necessary to break ties for advancement to the next round.

== Records ==
Prior to this competition, the existing world and Olympic records were as follows:

| World record | Alexandr Popov (RUS) | 48.21 | Monte Carlo, Monaco | 18 June 1994 |
| Olympic record | Matt Biondi (USA) | 48.63 | Seoul, South Korea | 22 September 1988 |

The following records were established during the competition:

| Date | Round | Name | Nationality | Time | Record |
|---|---|---|---|---|---|
| 16 September | Final* | Michael Klim | Australia | 48.18 | WR |
| 19 September | Semifinal 2 | Pieter van den Hoogenband | Netherlands | 47.84 | WR |

* Split from the men's 4 × 100 m freestyle relay

== Schedule ==
All times are Australian Eastern Standard Time (UTC+10)

| Date | Time | Round |
|---|---|---|
| Tuesday, 19 September 2000 | 10:00; 19:00 | Heats; Semifinals |
| Wednesday, 20 September 2000 | 19:53 | Final |

== Results ==
=== Heats ===
| Rank | Heat | Lane | Swimmer | Nation | Time | Notes |
|---|---|---|---|---|---|---|
| 1 | 9 | 4 | Pieter van den Hoogenband | Netherlands | 48.64 | Q |
| 2 | 10 | 5 | Michael Klim | Australia | 49.09 | Q |
| 3 | 10 | 6 | Lars Frölander | Sweden | 49.16 | Q, NR |
| 4 | 10 | 4 | Alexander Popov | Russia | 49.29 | Q |
| 5 | 9 | 5 | Gary Hall, Jr. | United States | 49.32 | Q |
| 6 | 8 | 2 | Denis Pimankov | Russia | 49.45 | Q |
| 6 | 8 | 5 | Chris Fydler | Australia | 49.45 | Q |
| 8 | 9 | 7 | Salim Iles | Algeria | 49.70 | Q, NR |
| 9 | 8 | 4 | Neil Walker | United States | 49.73 | Q |
| 10 | 10 | 2 | Lorenzo Vismara | Italy | 49.74 | Q |
| 10 | 10 | 1 | Roland Mark Schoeman | South Africa | 49.74 | Q |
| 12 | 10 | 8 | José Meolans | Argentina | 49.75 | Q, NR |
| 13 | 9 | 3 | Gustavo Borges | Brazil | 49.76 | Q |
| 13 | 8 | 7 | Christian Tröger | Germany | 49.76 | Q |
| 15 | 9 | 6 | Attila Zubor | Hungary | 49.79 | Q |
| 16 | 7 | 8 | Duje Draganja | Croatia | 49.83 | Q, NR |
| 17 | 10 | 7 | Bartosz Kizierowski | Poland | 49.84 | |
| 18 | 8 | 6 | Johan Kenkhuis | Netherlands | 49.93 | |
| 19 | 8 | 1 | Stefan Nystrand | Sweden | 50.19 | |
| 19 | 9 | 2 | Karel Novy | Switzerland | 50.19 | |
| 21 | 6 | 3 | Peter Mankoč | Slovenia | 50.28 | |
| 22 | 8 | 3 | Romain Barnier | France | 50.32 | |
| 23 | 7 | 2 | Rolandas Gimbutis | Lithuania | 50.46 | |
| 24 | 6 | 1 | Kim Min-suk | South Korea | 50.49 | |
| 25 | 7 | 4 | Torsten Spanneberg | Germany | 50.56 | |
| 26 | 9 | 8 | Yannick Lupien | Canada | 50.62 | |
| 27 | 8 | 8 | Pavlo Khnykin | Ukraine | 50.63 | |
| 28 | 7 | 3 | Javier Botello | Spain | 50.87 | |
| 29 | 7 | 5 | Craig Hutchison | Canada | 50.90 | |
| 30 | 9 | 1 | Aleh Rukhlevich | Belarus | 50.96 | |
| 30 | 7 | 1 | Marcos Hernández | Cuba | 50.96 | |
| 32 | 7 | 7 | Thierry Wouters | Belgium | 51.07 | |
| 33 | 7 | 6 | Jere Hård | Finland | 51.11 | |
| 34 | 6 | 5 | Spyridon Bitsakis | Greece | 51.28 | |
| 34 | 6 | 8 | Sergey Ashihmin | Kyrgyzstan | 51.28 | |
| 36 | 4 | 2 | Carl Probert | Fiji | 51.34 | NR |
| 37 | 6 | 7 | Richard Sam Bera | Indonesia | 51.52 | |
| 38 | 6 | 6 | Yoav Bruck | Israel | 51.62 | |
| 39 | 5 | 1 | Nikola Kalabić | FR Yugoslavia | 51.82 | |
| 40 | 4 | 5 | Christopher Murray | Bahamas | 51.93 | |
| 40 | 5 | 2 | Allen Ong | Malaysia | 51.93 | |
| 42 | 5 | 7 | George Gleason | Virgin Islands | 52.00 | |
| 43 | 4 | 7 | Indrek Sei | Estonia | 52.09 | |
| 44 | 4 | 6 | Tamer Hamed | Egypt | 52.14 | |
| 45 | 5 | 3 | Květoslav Svoboda | Czech Republic | 52.18 | |
| 46 | 3 | 4 | Paul Kutscher | Uruguay | 52.22 | |
| 47 | 4 | 8 | Fernando Jácome | Colombia | 52.24 | |
| 47 | 4 | 4 | Mark Chay | Singapore | 52.24 | |
| 49 | 6 | 2 | Željko Panić | Bosnia and Herzegovina | 52.40 | |
| 50 | 6 | 4 | Francisco Sánchez | Venezuela | 52.43 | |
| 51 | 3 | 2 | Howard Hinds | Netherlands Antilles | 52.52 | |
| 52 | 4 | 3 | Glen Walshaw | Zimbabwe | 52.53 | |
| 53 | 5 | 6 | Igor Sitnikov | Kazakhstan | 52.57 | |
| 54 | 3 | 3 | Aleksandr Agafonov | Uzbekistan | 52.58 | |
| 55 | 5 | 4 | Wu Nien-pin | Chinese Taipei | 52.72 | |
| 56 | 5 | 5 | Felipe Delgado | Ecuador | 52.78 | |
| 57 | 5 | 8 | Chrysanthos Papachrysanthou | Cyprus | 52.82 | |
| 58 | 3 | 5 | Ríkardur Ríkardsson | Iceland | 52.85 | |
| 59 | 3 | 6 | George Bovell | Trinidad and Tobago | 52.90 | |
| 60 | 3 | 1 | Gentle Offoin | Nigeria | 52.91 | NR |
| 61 | 3 | 7 | Kenny Roberts | Seychelles | 53.40 | |
| 62 | 4 | 1 | Rodrigo Olivares | Chile | 53.50 | |
| 63 | 2 | 3 | Gregory Arkhurst | Ivory Coast | 53.55 | |
| 64 | 3 | 8 | Alejandro Castellanos | Honduras | 54.06 | |
| 65 | 2 | 4 | Hamid Reza Mobarez | Iran | 54.12 | |
| 66 | 2 | 5 | Christophe Lim Wen Ying | Mauritius | 54.33 | |
| 67 | 2 | 6 | Ganaagiin Galbadrakh | Mongolia | 58.79 | |
| 68 | 2 | 2 | Ragi Edde | Lebanon | 59.26 | |
| 69 | 2 | 7 | Marien Michel Ngouabi | Republic of the Congo | 1:00.39 | |
| 70 | 2 | 1 | Dawood Youssef Mohamed Jassim | Bahrain | 1:02.45 | |
| 71 | 1 | 5 | Eric Moussambani | Equatorial Guinea | 1:52.72 | NR |
| — | 1 | 3 | Karim Bare | Niger | DSQ | |
| — | 1 | 4 | Farkhod Oripov | Tajikistan | DSQ | |
| — | 10 | 3 | Fernando Scherer | Brazil | DNS | |

=== Semifinals ===
| Rank | Heat | Lane | Swimmer | Nation | Time | Notes |
|---|---|---|---|---|---|---|
| 1 | 2 | 4 | Pieter van den Hoogenband | Netherlands | 47.84 | Q, WR |
| 2 | 1 | 4 | Michael Klim | Australia | 48.80 | Q |
| 3 | 1 | 5 | Alexander Popov | Russia | 48.84 | Q |
| 4 | 2 | 5 | Lars Frölander | Sweden | 48.93 | Q, NR |
| 5 | 2 | 2 | Neil Walker | United States | 49.04 | Q |
| 6 | 2 | 3 | Gary Hall, Jr. | United States | 49.13 | Q |
| 7 | 1 | 3 | Denis Pimankov | Russia | 49.43 | Q |
| 8 | 2 | 6 | Chris Fydler | Australia | 49.55 | Q |
| 9 | 2 | 8 | Attila Zubor | Hungary | 49.58 | |
| 10 | 1 | 7 | José Meolans | Argentina | 49.66 | NR |
| 11 | 1 | 2 | Lorenzo Vismara | Italy | 49.67 | |
| 11 | 1 | 8 | Duje Draganja | Croatia | 49.67 | NR |
| 13 | 1 | 6 | Salim Iles | Algeria | 49.70 | =NR |
| 14 | 1 | 1 | Christian Tröger | Germany | 49.80 | |
| 15 | 2 | 7 | Roland Mark Schoeman | South Africa | 49.84 | |
| 16 | 2 | 1 | Gustavo Borges | Brazil | 49.93 | |

=== Final ===
| Rank | Lane | Swimmer | Nation | Time | Notes |
|---|---|---|---|---|---|
| 1st place, gold medalist(s) | 4 | Pieter van den Hoogenband | Netherlands | 48.30 | |
| 2nd place, silver medalist(s) | 3 | Alexander Popov | Russia | 48.69 | |
| 3rd place, bronze medalist(s) | 7 | Gary Hall, Jr. | United States | 48.73 | |
| 4 | 5 | Michael Klim | Australia | 48.74 | |
| 5 | 2 | Neil Walker | United States | 49.09 | |
| 6 | 6 | Lars Frölander | Sweden | 49.22 | |
| 7 | 1 | Denis Pimankov | Russia | 49.36 | |
| 8 | 8 | Chris Fydler | Australia | 49.44 | |
