= Dmitri Margaryan =

Armenian swimmer

Personal information
- Full name: Dmitri Margaryan
- Nationality: Armenia
- Born: January 14, 1978 (age 48) Yerevan, Armenian SSR, Soviet Union

Sport
- Sport: Swimming
- Strokes: Freestyle
Medal record
Men's Swimming
Representing Armenia

Dmitri Margaryan (Armenian: Դմիտրի Մարգարյան, born January 14, 1978, in Yerevan, Armenian SSR) is an Armenian retired swimmer. He competed at the 2000 Summer Olympics in the men's 50 metre freestyle.
