= Gentle Offoin =

Nigerian swimmer

Personal information
- Full name: Gentle Offoin
- National team: Nigeria
- Born: 19 August 1973 (age 53)
- Height: 1.88 m (6 ft 2 in)
- Weight: 75 kg (165 lb)

Sport
- Sport: Swimming
- Strokes: Freestyle

Gentle Offoin (born 19 August 1973) is a Nigerian former swimmer, who specialized in sprint freestyle events. He held a Nigerian record in the 100 m freestyle, and later represented Nigeria at the 2000 Summer Olympics.

Offoin competed only in the men's 100 m freestyle at the 2000 Summer Olympics in Sydney. He received a Universality place from FINA, in an entry time of 53.08. He challenged seven other swimmers in heat three, including Trinidad and Tobago's 16-year-old George Bovell and Seychelles' three-time Olympian Kenny Roberts. He cleared a 53-second barrier, and established a Nigerian record of 52.91 to race for a sixth seed, finishing behind Bovell by a hundredth of a second (0.01). Offoin failed to advance into the semifinals, as he placed sixtieth overall in the prelims.
