= Khemo Rivera =

US Virgin Islands swimmer (born 1975)

Personal information
- Full name: Khemo Rivera
- Born: August 18, 1975 (age 50)

Sport
- Sport: Swimming

Khemo Rivera (born August 18, 1975) is a swimmer who represented the United States Virgin Islands. He competed in the men's 50 metre freestyle event at the 1996 Summer Olympics.
