= Pedro Silva (swimmer) =

Portuguese swimmer

Personal information
- Full name: Pedro Nuno Gonçalves; Conceição Silva
- National team: Portugal
- Born: 21 January 1977 (age 49) Lisbon, Portugal
- Height: 1.85 m (6 ft 1 in)
- Weight: 74 kg (163 lb)

Sport
- Sport: Swimming
- Strokes: Freestyle
- Club: Sport Algés e Dafundo
- Coach: Mário Madeira

Pedro Nuno Gonçalves Conceição Silva (born January 21, 1977) is a Portuguese former swimmer, who specialized in sprint freestyle events. He is a two-time Olympian (2000 and 2004) and a former Portuguese record holder in the 50 m freestyle (22.86). Silva is a resident athlete for Sport Algés e Dafundo, and is trained by his long-time coach, director, and mentor Mário Madeira.

Silva made his official debut at the 2000 Summer Olympics in Sydney, where he competed in the men's 50 m freestyle. Swimming in heat seven, he rounded out a field of seven swimmers to last place and thirty-sixth overall by 0.45 of a second behind winner Jiang Chengji of China in 23.27.

At the 2004 Summer Olympics in Athens, Silva qualified again for the 50 m freestyle by clearing a FINA B-standard entry time of 22.86 from the World Championships in Barcelona, Spain. He challenged seven other swimmers on the same heat as Sydney, including two-time Olympians Rolandas Gimbutis of Lithuania and Camilo Becerra of Colombia. He shared a sixth seed with Becerra in his lifetime best of 23.23. Silva failed to advance into the semifinals, as he managed to repeat the same position from his first Olympic stint in the preliminaries.
