= Shanina Shaik =

Australian model (born 1991)

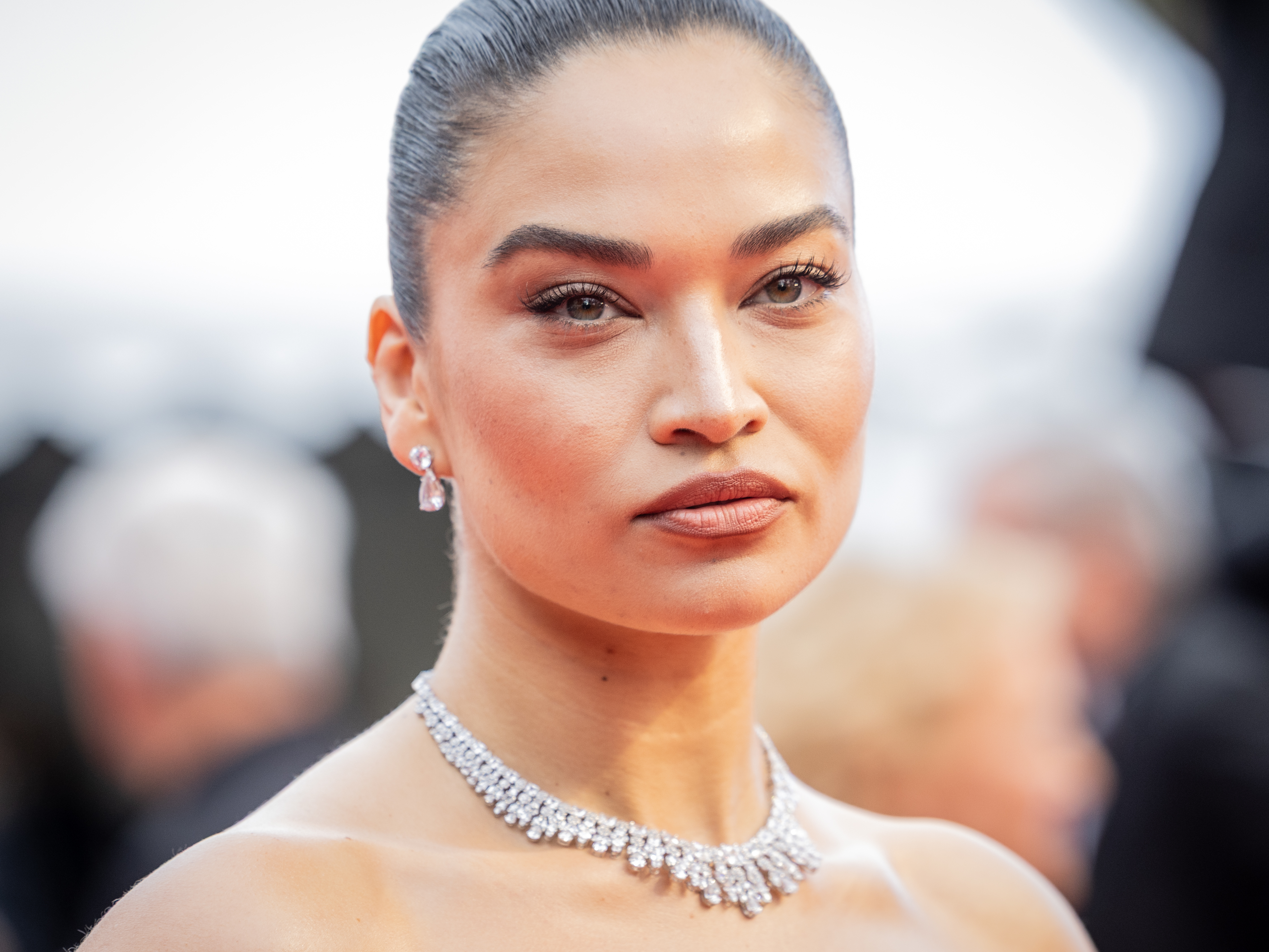
- Shaik in 2025
- Born: 11 February 1991 (age 35); Melbourne, Australia
- Occupation: Model
- Years active: 2008–present
- Spouse: DJ Ruckus (m. 2018; div. 2019)
- Partner: Matthew Adesuyan (2020–present)
- Children: 1
- Modelling information
- Height: 1.73 m (5 ft 8 in)
- Hair colour: Dark brown
- Eye colour: Green
- Agency: The Lions (New York); IMG Models (Paris, London, Milan); Traffic Models (Barcelona); MIKAs (Stockholm)

Shanina Mahinur Shaik (born 11 February 1991) is an Australian model.

== Early life and family ==
Shaik was born in Melbourne to an Australian mother, Kim, of Lithuanian descent; her maternal grandparents immigrated to Australia from Lithuania after World War II. Her father, Hanif, was born in Singapore and is of Pakistani and Saudi descent.

She started modelling when she was eight years old for Myer and appearing in a TV commercial for Hyundai, but stopped when she started high school and got accepted into an accelerated program, graduating a year before her classmates.

At the age of fifteen, encouraged by others, she entered the Girlfriend Model Competition. While agents were interested in her, she was too young to move to Sydney, so she went on to participate on the Australian modeling reality show Make Me A Supermodel, finishing as the runner-up.

Shaik was raised Muslim. Speaking about her upbringing in 2016, Shaik reflected: “I was born and raised Muslim and I lived a very normal lifestyle. My father is very open to my job and understanding and he is grateful for the woman I have become. I'm a very sophisticated and respectful woman. I had a great upbringing and a great lifestyle with my sibling.” In April 2022, Shaik stated that she "didn't grow up in a religious family" and she is "more of a spiritual person I'd say, and very focused on my mental health. That is something I have given more time to as I get older".

== Career ==
In her debut season during the Autumn/Winter 2009 season Shaik walked over 8 shows in New York City. She opened Yeohlee and walked for other designers such as Shipley & Halmos, Abaete, Mara Hoffman, Lorick, Project Runway, Trovata and Richie Rich. In her second season, she scored a show card for the Spring/Summer 2010. Following this she walked for designers Betsey Johnson, Catherine Malandrino, Gerlan Jeans, Nary Manivong, Rachel Antonoff and Susan Woo. During the Autumn/Winter 2010 season Shanina walked for Bebe by Kardashian, Emu Australia, Iodice and Project Runway.

Shaik has appeared in catalogues for Macy's, Alloy, Avon, Intermix, Urban Outfitters, Lovable, Burda Style, Spiegel, Free People, Bloomingdales, J. C. Penney, Seafolly, Otto, Shop Bop, Sasha Samuel and Ann Taylor. Her advertisements include Aéropostale, Cotton On, Olay New Look, Burneo Chocolate, Bath & Body Works 'Dark Kiss' fragrance, Edward Joseph, Imari by Avon, General Pants Co., Bonds, Bauhaus and Matrix Hair Biolage

Shortly after signing with New York Model Management, Shaik appeared in editorials for Seventeen Magazine and Men's Health. Other appearances include Level Magazine, Orlando Style Magazine, 2 Wheeler Tuner Magazine, Philadelphia Style Magazine, Tu Style and Zink Magazine.

In 2010, Shaik walked in the Spring/Summer 2011 catwalk show for Project Runway and L.A.M.B.

In 2011, she switched to NEXT Model Management, and from Chadwick Model Management to Chic Model Management. She starred in a campaign for Italian lingerie giant Intimissimi and Australian shoe brand RMK. Shaik has worked for other brands such as Macy's, Avon, Bloomingdales, Free People, Olay, Seafolly, Spiegel, J. C. Penney and Sasha Samuel. She also starred at Rosemount Australian Fashion Week Spring/Summer 2012 walking for Bless'ed Are The Meek, Guanabana, Karen Neilson, Kirrily Johnston, L.A.M.B., Lisa Blue, Lisa Marie, Miss Unkon, None the Richer, Nookie Beach, Project Runway, Roopa Pemmaraju, Terri Donna, Wonders Cease.

Shaik scored a breakthrough when she was cast to walk in the 2011 Victoria's Secret Fashion Show, making her the sixth Australian along with Miranda Kerr, Jessica Hart, Elyse Taylor, Sarah Stephens, and Abbey Lee Kershaw to star in the show. Shaik has also walked for Chanel's Pre-Fall 2012 collection at the Grand Palais in Paris.

In 2012, Shaik appeared in print-work for Victoria's Secret and Bonds. During Fall/Winter 2012 Fashion Week she opened Jason Wu, and also walked for Ruffian, Kevork Kiledjian, Charlotte Ronson, Nanette Lepore, Diesel, Oscar de la Renta, L'Wren Scott, Tom Ford, Blumarine, Atsuro Tayama, Maiyet, Vivienne Westwood, and Stella McCartney. Shaik also did a shoot with Vogue Australia. She is also an ambassador for Just Jeans and has modelled alongside rugby star Sonny Bill Williams. In 2016, Shaik became a brand ambassador for Australian swimwear brand Seafolly.

Shaik was featured on the covers of Cosmopolitan, Cleo, Vogue India, Harper's Bazaar Singapore, Arabia, Vietnam and Australia. In 2019, she appeared on the May/June cover of Maxim.

== Personal life ==
Shaik got engaged to her boyfriend of eight months Gregory “DJ Ruckus” Andrews in December 2015. They married in the Bahamas in April 2018. They separated in June 2019, and Shaik filed for divorce a month later after a year of marriage. During divorce proceedings, Shaik requested spousal support. In January 2020, it was reported that the divorce was finalised.

In 2020, she began a relationship with the advertising agent, Matthew Adesuyan, and on 8 May 2022, she announced on Instagram that she is expecting their first child. She gave birth on 19 September 2022. In August 26, 2026, Shaik announced that she is expecting her second child with a music executive named Ryan Press.

Shaik is an ovo-pescetarian who adheres to a heavily plant-based diet. She also eschews soft drinks like soda and fruit juice.
