= Rhys Uhlich =

Australian model and actor

- Born: Rhys Uhlich; 22 October 1983 (age 42)
- Occupations: Model, actor
- Known for: Make Me A Supermodel 2008 (winner)
- Modeling information
- Height: 1.83 m (6 ft 0 in)
- Hair color: Blond
- Eye color: Green
- Website: www.rhysuhlich.com.au

Rhys Uhlich (/ˈjuːlɪk/ YOO-lik; born 22 October 1983) is an Australian male model and winner of Channel 7's Make Me a Supermodel. The national television show, hosted by Jennifer Hawkins, launched Uhlich's media career. Uhlich came into modelling as a primary school teacher.

In 2009, Uhlich appeared on Channel 10's Talkin' 'Bout Your Generation and previously had a part-time role as a reporter on the network's morning show The Circle. Ulrich is a reporter on the Seven Network's Coxy's Big Break.

Uhlich will film a role in Blow Back, a feature film about a bank heist. On 24 September 2012, it was announced Uhlich had joined the cast of Neighbours for two months as Scotty Boland.

In 2020 Rhys was the face of the MYER campaign “layers of me”

In 2022 Rhys launched his national building company shed house Australia which builds architectural shed houses nationwide

== Personal life ==
In 2010, Uhlich and his partner Claire Virgona became parents to a daughter called Indah.

In 2014 Rhys and claire welcomed their second daughter mahli.

In 2022 Rhys launched his national building company Shed House Australia
