= Dawood Youssef =

Bahraini swimmer

Personal information
- Born: September 10, 1985 (age 40)

Sport
- Sport: Swimming

Dawood Youssef Mohamed Jassim (Arabic: داود يوسف محمد جاسم; born September 10, 1985) is a Bahraini swimmer, who specialized in sprint freestyle events. Youssef represented Bahrain at the 2000 Summer Olympics, where he became the nation's flag bearer in the opening ceremony.

Youssef competed only in the men's 100 m freestyle, as a 15-year-old, at the 2000 Summer Olympics in Sydney. He received a Universality place from FINA, without meeting an entry time. He challenged six other swimmers in heat two, including fellow 15-year-old Ragi Edde of Lebanon. He rounded out the field to last place in a personal best of 1:02.45, nearly a nine-second deficit from leader Gregory Arkhurst of Côte d'Ivoire. Youssef failed to advance into the semifinals, as he placed seventieth overall in the prelims.
