= Athletics at the 2000 Summer Olympics – Qualification =

For the athletics competitions at the 2000 Summer Olympics, the following qualification systems were in place.

== Qualifying standards ==
A National Olympic Committee (NOC) may enter up to 3 qualified athletes in each individual event if all athletes meet the A standard during the qualifying period. An NOC may also enter a maximum of 1 qualified if they have met the B standard. An NOC may also enter a maximum of 1 qualified relay team per event. NOCs may enter athletes regardless of mark (1 athlete per gender) if they have no athletes meeting the entry standard. This makes it possible for every nation to have a minimum of one representative of each gender in the sport.

The qualifying time standards may be obtained in various meets during the given period that have the approval of the IAAF. All approved outdoor meets and indoor meets with the exception of 100 m, 200 m and 110 /100 m hurdles races are eligible.

For the relays, the top 16 teams in each division were accepted.

The NOCs are still allowed to select athletes using their own rules, on the condition that all of them have made the qualifying time. For example, the United States selects athletes based on the results of the 2000 United States Olympic Trials event. Sweden only enters athletes deemed good enough to reach at least the eighth position, based on an assessment by the Swedish NOC.

The IAAF Qualifying Standards were as follows:

Men's events			Women's events		
Event	A Standard	B Standard	Event	A Standard	B Standard
100 m	10.27	10.40	100 m	11.40	11.60
200 m	20.70	20.90	200 m	23.20	23.50
400 m	45.80	46.20	400 m	52.20	53.20
800 m	1:46.30	1:47.20	800 m	2:00.50	2:02.50
1500 m	3:36.80	3:39.50	1500 m	4:08.00	4:12.00
5000 m	13:29.00	13:34.00	5000 m	15:35.00	15:55.00
10,000 m	28:10.00	28:28.00	10,000 m	32:30.00	33:20.00
110 m hurdles	13.70	13.85	100 m hurdles	13.10	13.40
400 m hurdles	49.90	50.20	400 m hurdles	56.14	57.14
3000 m steeplechase	8:27.00	8:30.70	—	—	—
Marathon	2:14:00	2:20:00	Marathon	2:33:00	2:45:00
High jump	2.28	2.25	High jump	1.93	1.88
Pole vault	5.60	5.45	Pole vault	4.30	4.20
Long jump	8.05	7.95	Long jump	6.65	6.50
Triple jump	16.85	16.65	Triple jump	14.15	13.95
Shot put	19.70	19.30	Shot put	18.30	17.95
Discus throw	63.50	62.00	Discus throw	61.00	58.00
Hammer throw	75.50	72.50	Hammer throw	65.00	63.50
Javelin throw	82.00	77.50	Javelin throw	60.50	57.00
Decathlon	8050	7800	Heptathlon	6000	5750
