= Jiang Chengji =

Chinese swimmer (born 1975)

Personal information
- Born: November 25, 1975 (age 50)

Sport
- Sport: Swimming
Medal record
Representing China
Asian Games
Gold medal – first place	1994 Hiroshima	10m butterfly
Gold medal – first place	1998 Bangkok	50m freestyle
Silver medal – second place	1994 Hiroshima	50m freestyle
Silver medal – second place	1994 Hiroshima	4x100m medley relay

Jiang Chengji (born 25 November 1975) (simplified Chinese: 蒋丞稷; traditional Chinese: 蔣丞稷; pinyin: Jiǎng Chéngjì; born November 25, 1975, in Shanghai) is an international male Chinese butterfly, breaststroke and freestyle swimmer from Shanghai. He competed at the 1996 Summer Olympics in the 100 m butterfly, finishing fourth, 0.07 seconds behind the bronze medal winner. He also finished in 4th place in the 50m freestyle at the same Olympics, 0.04 seconds behind the third-place finisher.

Jiang also participated for China in 2000 Summer Olympics in the 50 m freestyle but failed to pass into the later stages, finishing tied 17th, 0.02 seconds outside the time needed to qualify for the semifinals.

Jiang finished third at the 2004–05 FINA Swimming World Cup in the men's freestyle.

On the national stage Jiang also won a record of five gold medals at the Chinese Ninth National Games.
