= Dmitry Kalinovsky =

Belarusian swimmer

Personal information
- Native name: Дзмітрый Каліноўскі
- Nationality: Belarus
- Born: February 24, 1972 (age 54) Minsk, Belarus
- Height: 6 ft 5 in (195 cm)
- Weight: 198 lb (90 kg)

Sport
- Sport: Swimming
- Strokes: Freestyle
Medal record
European Championships (SC)
Bronze medal – third place	1996 Rostock	50 m freestyle

Dmitry Kalinovsky or Dzmitry Kalinowski (Belarusian: Дзмітрый Аляксеевіч Каліноўскі, Russian: Дмитрий Алексеевич Калиновский, born February 24, 1972) is a former freestyle swimmer from Minsk, Belarus, who represented his native country at two consecutive Summer Olympics, starting in 1996 (Atlanta, Georgia). He is best known for winning the bronze medal in the men's 50 m freestyle at the 1996 European SC Championships in Rostock. Kalinovsky holding national record.
