= Estebán Blanco =

Costa Rican swimmer (born 1981)

Personal information
- Full name: Estebán Blanco Uhlenhaut
- National team: Costa Rica
- Born: 16 December 1981 (age 44) San José, Costa Rica
- Height: 1.83 m (6 ft 0 in)
- Weight: 75 kg (165 lb)

Sport
- Sport: Swimming
- Strokes: Freestyle

Estebán Blanco Uhlenhaut (born 16 December 1981) is a Costa Rican former swimmer, who specialized in sprint freestyle events. Blanco represented Costa Rica at the 2000 Summer Olympics. He currently holds a national record in the 50 m freestyle that stood for more than a decade.

Blanco competed only in the men's 50 m freestyle at the 2000 Summer Olympics in Sydney. He achieved a FINA B-standard entry time of 23.87 from the Central American and Mexican Championships in his hometown San José. Swimming in heat three, Blanco powered past the entire field to a top seed in a new Costa Rican record of 23.72. However, Blanco's blistering triumph was not enough to put him through to the semifinals, as he placed forty-fifth overall out of 80 swimmers in the prelims.
