= Khalid Al-Kulaibi =

Omani swimmer

Personal information
- Full name: Khalid Al-Kulaibi
- National team: Oman
- Born: 2 May 1986 (age 40) Muscat, Oman
- Height: 1.70 m (5 ft 7 in)
- Weight: 63 kg (139 lb)

Sport
- Sport: Swimming
- Strokes: Freestyle, open water

Khalid Al-Kulaibi (Arabic: خالد الكليبي; born May 2, 1986) is an Omani swimmer, who specialized in sprint freestyle and open water marathon. He represented Oman, as a 14-year-old, at the 2000 Summer Olympics, and later became an open water swimmer at the 2011 FINA World Championships.

Al-Kulaibi competed only in the men's 50 m freestyle at the 2000 Summer Olympics in Sydney. He received a ticket from FINA, under a Universality program, in an entry time of 26.96. Swimming in heat two, he edged out Laos' Sikhounxay Ounkhamphanyavong on the final stretch to save a seventh seed by 0.07 of a second in 26.96. Al-Kulaibi failed to advance into the semifinals, as he placed sixty-eighth overall out of 80 swimmers in the prelims.

Eleven years after his Olympic stint, Al-Kulaibi qualified for his Omani team, as a 25-year-old open water swimmer, at the 2011 FINA World Championships in Shanghai, China. He placed forty-first in the 5 km race with a scintillating time of 1:02:14.8, sufficiently enough for his personal best.
