= Allan Murray (swimmer) =

Bahamian swimmer (born 1972)

Personal information
- Full name: Allan Murray
- National team: Bahamas
- Born: 19 July 1972 (age 53) Freeport, Bahamas
- Height: 1.84 m (6 ft 0 in)
- Weight: 84 kg (185 lb)

Sport
- Sport: Swimming
- Strokes: Freestyle
- Club: Swift Swim Club
- College team: University of Georgia (U.S.)
- Coach: Andy Knowles

Allan Murray (born 19 June 1972) is a Bahamian former swimmer who specialized in sprint freestyle events. He is a three-time Olympian (1992, 1996, and 2000), and a top 16 finalist in the 50 m freestyle at his second Olympic appearance in Atlanta. While studying in the United States, Murray was a member of Georgia Bulldogs swimming team under head coach Jack Bauerle.

== Career ==
=== Early years ===
Born and raised in Freeport, Grand Bahama, Bahamas, Murray later emerged as the first Bahamian swimmer to reach a summit of worldwide swimming success. He started his sporting career as a resident athlete for the Swift Swim Club, and was trained by his longtime coach Andy Knowles, a former University of Miami swimmer. In 1991, Murray accepted on an athletic scholarship at the University of Georgia in Athens, Georgia, where he majored in mathematics and played for the Georgia Bulldogs swimming and diving team under head coach Jack Bauerle.

=== Olympic career ===
Murray made his worldwide debut as a member of the Bahamian squad at the 1992 Summer Olympics in Barcelona. He placed almost in the "middle-of-the-road" in any of his individual events, finishing twenty-first in the 50 m freestyle (23.35) and forty-third in the 100 m freestyle (52.43).

At the 1996 Summer Olympics in Atlanta, Murray made a historic milestone for the Bahamas, as he became the first ever swimmer to reach an Olympic final. In the 50 m freestyle, Murray shared a twelfth-place tie with Brazil's top medal favorite Gustavo Borges, finishing in a joint time of 22.92.

Murray swam for his third time in the 50 m freestyle at the 2000 Summer Olympics in Sydney. He posted a FINA B-standard of 23.11 from the Pan American Games in Winnipeg, Manitoba, Canada. He challenged seven other swimmers in heat five, including Uzbekistan's top favorite Ravil Nachaev. Unable to keep himself in good form, Murray came up short in second place by 0.22 of a second behind Nachaev in 23.34. Murray failed to advance into the semifinals, as he placed thirty-seventh overall in the prelims.

Shortly after his third Olympics, Murray retired from swimming to work as an assistant coach for the Bahamas Swimming Federation.

== Personal bests ==
Event	Time
50 m freestyle	22.76
100 m freestyle	50.20

== See also ==
- Georgia Bulldogs
- List of University of Georgia people
