= Emin Guliyev (swimmer) =

Azerbaijani swimmer (born 1975)

Personal information
- Born: October 8, 1975 (age 50) Baku, Azerbaijani SSR, Soviet Union

Sport
- Sport: Swimming
- Strokes: Freestyle

Emin Aleksandr Guliyev (born October 8, 1975) is an Azerbaijani former swimmer, who specialized in sprint freestyle events. He represented Azerbaijan in two editions of the Olympic Games since the nation officiated its debut from the former Soviet Union in 1996.

Guliyev made his official debut at the 1996 Summer Olympics in Atlanta, where he competed only in the 50 m freestyle. Swimming in heat three, he rounded out the field to last place and fifty-ninth overall in 25.23.

At the 2000 Summer Olympics in Sydney, Guliyev competed for the second time in the 50 m freestyle. He received a ticket from FINA, under a Universality program, in an entry time of 24.00. He challenged seven other swimmers in heat three, including fellow two-time Olympian Howard Hinds of the Netherlands Antilles. He edged out Angola's 17-year-old João Aguiar to snatch a seventh spot by 0.34 of a second in 25.36. Guliyev failed to advance into the semifinals, as he placed sixtieth overall in the prelims.
