= Hassan Mubah =

Maldivian swimmer

Personal information
- Full name: Hassan Mubah
- National team: Maldives
- Born: 21 April 1984 (age 42) Male, Maldives
- Height: 1.75 m (5 ft 9 in)
- Weight: 52 kg (115 lb)

Sport
- Sport: Swimming
- Strokes: Freestyle

Hassan Mubah (born 21 April 1984) is a Maldivian former swimmer, who specialized in sprint freestyle events. He is a two-time Olympian (2000 and 2004), and holds numerous Maldivian records in the 50 and 100 m freestyle.

Mubah made his official debut, as a 16-year-old, at the 2000 Summer Olympics in Sydney, where he competed in the men's 50 m freestyle. Swimming in heat one, he posted a lifetime best of 28.86 to earn a fifth spot and seventy-third overall by a 3.43-second margin behind winner Wael Ghassan of Qatar.

At the 2004 Summer Olympics in Athens, Mubah swam for the second time in the 50 m freestyle. As part of an Olympic Solidarity program, he received a Universality place from FINA in an entry time of 27.51. He challenged seven other swimmers in heat three, including 16-year-old Chris Hackel of Mauritius. He saved a seventh spot over Uganda's Edgar Luberenga by six hundredths of a second (0.06), outside his entry time of 27.71. Mubah failed to advance into the semifinals, as he managed to repeat the same position from his first Olympic stint in the preliminaries.
