= Gregory Arkhurst =

Ivorian swimmer (born 1976)

Personal information
- Nationality: Ivorian, French
- Born: 6 May 1976 (age 50) Abidjan, Ivory Coast

Sport
- Sport: Swimming

Gregory Arkhurst (born 6 May 1976) is an Ivorian former swimmer. He represented Ivory Coast at the 2000 and 2004 Summer Olympics, while living and training in Canada, however.

He now coaches Mary-Sophie Harvey and was part of the Canadian team during the last Olympic Games in Paris.

== 2000 ==
Arkhurst swam in the 100 metre freestyle in 2000, finishing 63rd out of 74 total swimmers.

== 2004 ==
In 2004, he swam in the 50 metre freestyle, finishing 58th out of 86 total swimmers.
