= Howard Hinds =

Curaçao swimmer (born 1977)

Personal information
- Full name: Howard Xavier Hinds
- National team: Netherlands Antilles
- Born: 29 October 1977 (age 48) Willemstad, Curaçao
- Height: 1.84 m (6 ft 0 in)
- Weight: 87 kg (192 lb)

Sport
- Sport: Swimming
- Strokes: Freestyle
- Club: Fort Lauderdale Swim Team (USA)
- Coach: Jack Nelson (USA)

Howard Xavier Hinds (born October 29, 1977) is a Curaçao former swimmer, who specialized in sprint freestyle and butterfly events. He is a two-time Olympian (1996 and 2000), and a member of the Fort Lauderdale Swim Team, under head coach Jack Nelson.

Hinds made his official debut for the Netherlands Antilles at the 1996 Summer Olympics in Atlanta. He failed to reach the top 16 final in the 50 m freestyle, finishing only in fifty-fourth place at 24.63.

At the 2000 Summer Olympics in Sydney, Hinds competed only in a sprint freestyle double. He achieved FINA B-standards of 23.88 (50 m freestyle) and 52.58 (100 m freestyle) from the Pan American Games in Winnipeg, Manitoba, Canada. In the 100 m freestyle, Hinds placed fifty-first on the morning prelims. Swimming in heat three, he fell short to a second seed, from start to finish, in a lifetime best of 52.52, clipping 0.06 seconds off his entry time, but finishing just behind Uzbekistan's Ravil Nachaev, the winner of his heat, by three-tenths of a second (0.30). Two days later, in the 50 m freestyle, Hinds pulled off again a second seed and fifty-second overall in the same heat at 24.07, nearly half a second (0.50) behind Costa Rica's Estebán Blanco.
