= Wael Ghassan =

Qatari swimmer

Personal information
- Born: January 1, 1984 (age 42)

Sport
- Sport: Swimming

Wael Ghassan Saeed (Arabic: وائل غسان سعيد) (born January 1, 1984) is a Qatari swimmer. He competed at the 2000 Summer Olympics.
