= Sikhounxay Ounkhamphanyavong =

Laotian swimmer

Personal information
- Born: 18 November 1982 (age 43)

Sport
- Sport: Swimming
- Strokes: Freestyle

Sikhounxay Ounkhamphanyavong (born 18 November 1982) is a Laotian swimmer.

Described as "the big name of Laotian swimming", he represented his country at the 2000 Summer Olympics in Sydney, in the men's 50 metre freestyle. He had trained in one of the world's poorest countries, "where the largest pool is 25 meters long – half the Olympic distance". A reporter for the Australian Broadcasting Corporation noted that "a 25m pool badly in need of cleaning is [his] only place to train." Ounkhamphanyavong finished last in his heat, with a time of 27.03, and did not advance to the semi-finals.
