= Shamha Ahmed =

Maldivian athletics competitor

Personal information
- Spouse: Oliver
- Children: 3
Medal record
Women's Athletics
Representing Maldives
Indian Ocean Island Games
Bronze medal – third place	2015 Saint-Paul	10,000 m
Runtalya Marathon
Silver medal – second place	2025 Antalya	Marathon

Shamha Ahmed (born 8 April 1982) is a Maldivian long-distance runner and former sprinter. She represented the Maldives at the 2000 Summer Olympics in Sydney and held the Maldivian women's 100 metres national record for 21 years, from 2001 until 2022.

After transitioning to endurance events, Shamha won a bronze medal in the women's 10,000 metres at the 2015 Indian Ocean Island Games—becoming the first Maldivian female athlete to win a medal at an international multi-sport event—and has set multiple Maldivian national records across track and road distance races, including the 5000 metres, 10,000 metres, half marathon, and marathon.

== Personal life and career ==
Born in Malé into a family of eight, Shamha began competing in athletics during her school years at an inter-house athletics meet, where she ran the women's 100 metres in 13.20 seconds in 1998—reported as a Maldivian national record at the time—before representing the Maldives in the 100 metres at the 1998 World Junior Championships in Annecy, France.

She competed in the women's 100 metres at the 2000 Summer Olympics in Sydney, finishing eighth in her preliminary heat in 12.87 seconds. At the 2001 World Championships in Athletics in Edmonton, Canada, on 5 August 2001, she ran a personal best and Maldivian national record of 12.27 seconds in the 100 metres; the mark stood for roughly two decades before it was surpassed by Aishath Himna Hassan at the 2022 Commonwealth Games.

Shamha relocated to Germany in 2004, where she lives with her husband, Oliver, and three children, Luca, Jonah, and Malala. She represented the Maldives at the 2014 IAAF World Half Marathon Championships in Copenhagen, placing 87th in 1:42:04, and won a bronze medal in the women's 10,000 metres (45:12.36) at the 2015 Indian Ocean Island Games in Réunion, described in reporting as the first medal won by a Maldivian female athlete at an international multi-sport Games. At the 2016 South Asian Games in Guwahati, India, she was part of the Maldivian women's 4 × 100 metres relay quartet (alongside Afa Ismail, Aminath Nazra, and Mirfath Ahmed) that recorded a reported national record of 51.32 seconds to finish sixth.

In 2022, Shamha shifted her focus to long-distance running under coach Nasrullah Ahmed ("Nasru"). In September 2022, she set reported national marks across road distances at the Oslo Marathon—including 40:39 in the 10 km, 1:01:10 in the 15 km, 1:22:40 in the 20 km, and 1:27:25 in the half marathon—before running the Berlin Marathon on 25 September 2022. She later lowered her half-marathon time to 1:26:42 at the Bangabandhu International Half Marathon in Dhaka on 20 January 2023.

In May 2024, she ran 19:41.86 in the women's 5,000 metres at the Grefrath Railway Open Race in Germany. In August 2025, at age 43, she set a reported Maldivian national record of 40:41.83 in the women's 10,000 metres at the Night of the Tens in Hamburg, Germany. She has also competed in several major international marathons, including Berlin, Tokyo, Boston, Chicago, and New York City, as well as road marathons such as Antalya and Frankfurt. In November 2026, she competed in the inaugural NN Marathon The Hague, finishing in 3:09:04.

== National records ==
Event	Record	Date	Meet	Location
100 m	12.27	5 August 2001	World Championships	Edmonton, Canada
200 m	26.25	28 September 1999	South Asian Games	Kathmandu, Nepal
4 × 100 m relay	51.32	10 February 2016	South Asian Games	Guwahati, India
5,000 m	19:42.45	18 April 2024	Grefrath Railway Open Race	Grefrath, Germany
5,000 m	19:41.86	4 May 2024	DM Langstrecke	Wassenberg, Germany
10,000 m	40:41.83	9 August 2025	Night of the Tens	Hamburg, Germany
1 mile	5:49:24	6 September 2026	Die New Balance Kö Meile	Düsseldorf, Germany
5 km (road)	20:08	12 June 2022	20. EVL-HalbMarathon	Leverkusen, Germany
5 km (road)	19:15	5 March 2023	Straßenlauf Rund um das Bayer-Kreuz	Leverkusen, Germany
10 km (road)	40:39+	17 September 2022	Oslo Marathon	Oslo, Norway
10 km (road)	39:34	26 March 2023	Arrow Venloop	Venlo, Netherlands
15 km (road)	1:01:10+	20 January 2023	Bangabandhu International Half Marathon	Dhaka, Bangladesh
20 km (road)	1:22:40+	17 September 2022	Oslo Marathon	Oslo, Norway
Half marathon	1:26:42	20 January 2023	Bangabandhu International Half Marathon	Dhaka, Bangladesh
Marathon	3:02:41	25 September 2022	Berlin Marathon	Berlin, Germany

Note: "+" indicates an intermediate split time recorded during a longer race.

== Achievements ==
Year	Tournament	Venue	Event	Result
2015	Indian Ocean Island Games	Saint-Paul, Réunion	10,000 m	3rd place, bronze medalist(s)

== World Marathon Majors ==
Shamha has competed in several Abbott World Marathon Majors races as well as independent marathons.

Event	Time	Date	Location
2022 Berlin Marathon	3:01:31	25 September 2022	Berlin, Germany
2024 Berlin Marathon	3:01:56	29 September 2024	Berlin, Germany
2025 Tokyo Marathon	3:11:53	2 March 2025	Tokyo, Japan
2025 Berlin Marathon	3:20:36	21 September 2025	Berlin, Germany
2025 New York City Marathon	3:18:39	2 November 2025	New York City, United States
2026 Boston Marathon	3:20:32	20 April 2026	Boston, United States
2026 Chicago Marathon	3:16:19	11 October 2026	Chicago, United States

== Independent Marathons ==
Event	Time	Date	Location
2025 Runtalya Marathon	3:11:50	6 April 2025	Antalya, Turkey
2025 Frankfurt Marathon	3:04:09	26 October 2025	Frankfurt, Germany
2026 NN Marathon The Hague	3:09:04	1 November 2026	The Hague, Netherlands

== See also ==
- List of Maldivian records in athletics
- Maldives at the 2000 Summer Olympics
- Maldives at the 2015 Indian Ocean Island Games
- Athletics in the Maldives
