= List of Maldivian records in athletics =

The following are the national records in athletics in Maldives maintained by Maldives' national athletics federation: Athletics Association of Maldives (AAM).

== Outdoor ==
Key to tables: Awaiting ratification Record not kept by AAM Not ratified or later rescinded by AAM

=== Men ===
Event	Record	Athlete	Date	Meet	Place	Ref.
100 m	10.33 (+1.9 m/s)	Hassan Saaid	16 April 2016	MVP Track & Field Meeting	Kingston, Jamaica	
200 m	20.75 (+1.0 m/s)	Hassan Saaid	11 July 2016	Indian Grand Prix	Bangalore, India	
400 m	47.48	Hassan Saaid	1 June 2013	JAAA All Comers Meet #4	Kingston, Jamaica	
800 m	1:53.08	Naseer Ismail	27 September 1999	South Asian Games	Kathmandu, Nepal	
1500 m	3:57.44	Hussain Fazeel Haroon	18 June 2023	62nd National Inter State Championships	Bhubaneswar, India	
3000 m	9:02.57	Hussain Fazeel Haroon	12 November 2022	National Grand Prix	Hulhumalé, Maldives	
3000 m	8:55.87	Hussain Fazeel Haroon	23 December 2023	National Grand Prix	Malé, Maldives	
5000 m	15:30.27	Hussain Fazeel Haroon	24 April 2019	Asian Championships	Doha, Qatar	
5 km (road)	15:33	Rasheed Mohamed	21 February 2020	Ras Al Khaimah 5K	Ras Al Khaimah, United Arab Emirates	
10,000 m	32:46.14	Hussain Fazeel Haroon	21 April 2019	Asian Championships	Doha, Qatar	
10 km (road)	31:48	Hussain Fazeel Haroon	18 February 2018	10km International De Meknès	Meknes, Morocco	
15 km (road)	50:43+	Yoosuf Ibrahim	20 January 2023	Dhaka Marathon	Dhaka, Bangladesh	
15 km (road)	49:13+	Yoosuf Ibrahim	7 January 2023	Gold Coast Marathon	Gold Coast, Australia	
20 km (road)	1:09:21+	Mohamed Shifaz	6 April 2019	Prague Half Marathon	Prague, Czech Republic	
20 km (road)	1:06:14+	Yoosuf Ibrahim	7 January 2023	Gold Coast Marathon	Gold Coast, Australia	
Half marathon	1:09:58	Yoosuf Ibrahim	7 January 2023	Gold Coast Marathon	Gold Coast, Australia	
30 km (road)	1:47:50+	Mohamed Shifaz	25 January 2019	Dubai Marathon	Dubai, United Arab Emirates	
Marathon	2:32:56	Mohamed Shifaz	25 January 2019	Dubai Marathon	Dubai, United Arab Emirates	
110 m hurdles						
400 m hurdles						
3000 m steeplechase						
High jump	1.91 m	Yusuf Naik Vajeeh	19 June 2026	Maldivian Championships	Malé, Maldives	
High jump	1.92 m	Yusuf Naik Vajeeh	18 January 2026	Dubai Jump Fest	Dubai, United Arab Emirates	
Pole vault						
Long jump	6.47 m	Hussain Haleem	2 October 2009	8th AAM Championships	Malé, Maldives	
Long jump	6.71 m (+0.9 m/s)	Ibrahim Naahil Nizaar	12 August 2022	Islamic Solidarity Games	Konya, Turkey	
Long jump	6.82 m (−0.2 m/s)	Ibrahim Naahil Nizaar	25 August 2022	Maldivian Championships	Malé, Maldives	
Triple jump	12.76 m	Ahmed Fall	November 1996	10th National Meet	Malé, Maldives	
Shot put	11.02 m	Hassan Shamoon	1 October 2015	25th National Championships	Malé, Maldives	
Discus throw	32.30 m	Hassan Shamoon	24 October 2014	24th National Championships	Malé, Maldives	
Hammer throw						
Javelin throw	47.60 m	Abdulla Mahir	6 August 2010	13th Interschool Championships	Malé, Maldives	
Decathlon						
Decathlon	100m (wind) / Long jump (wind) / Shot put / High jump / 400m / 110m H (wind) / Discus / Pole vault / Javelin / 1500m					
5000 m walk (track)	28:28.8	Ibrahim Saleem	August 1991	8th National Meet	Maldives	
20 km walk (road)						
50 km walk (road)						
4 × 100 m relay	41.21	Maldives; Hassan Saaid; Hussain Haleem; Hussain Inaas; Azneem Ahmed	10 February 2016	South Asian Games	Guwahati, India	
4 × 200 m relay	1:31.36	Maldives; Ali Sham; Ibrahim Ashfan Ali; Ahmed Anoof; Mohamed Naail	2 April 2016		Molepolole, Botswana	
4 × 400 m relay	3:14.30	Maldives; Ahmed Hassan; Hussain Riza; Hussain Inaas; Hassan Saaid	6 August 2015	Indian Ocean Island Games	Saint-Paul, Réunion	

=== Women ===
Event	Record	Athlete	Date	Meet	Place	Ref.
100 m	11.87 (+1.1 m/s)	Mariyam Ru Ya Ali	25 May 2024	JAAA All Comers Series #2	Kingston, Jamaica	
200 m	24.96 (+0.5 m/s)	Afa Ismail	14 August 2016	Olympic Games	Rio de Janeiro, Brazil	
200 m	24.90 (+0.6 m/s)	Aishath Hassan	26 August 2022	Maldivian Championships	Malé, Maldives	
200 m	24.66 (+1.3 m/s) (Note: All time results during the first three days of competition have been cancelled because of wrong chronometre.)	Aishath Hassan	10 August 2022	Islamic Solidarity Games	Konya, Turkey	
400 m	57.56	Aishath Hassan	13 June 2022	National Time Trial	Hulhumalé, Maldives	
800 m	2:14.53	Fasuha Ahmed	12 June 2024	3rd National Grand Prix Meeting	Bangalore, India	
800 m	2:13.81	Fasuhaa Ahmed	14 July 2024	Sri Lankan U23 Championships	Diyagama, Sri Lanka	
1500 m	5:14.38	Aminath Jaaisha Juneez	30 August 2018	Asian Games	Jakarta, Indonesia	
1500 m	5:04.02	Fasuhaa Ahmed	22 December 2023	National Grand Prix	Malé, Maldives	
3000 m	12:03.2	Fathimath Hashma Abdul Aziz	28 December 2005	16th National Tournament	Malé, Maldives	
5000 m	19:41.86	Shamha Ahmed	4 May 2024	Grefrath Railway Open Race	Wassenberg, Germany	
5 km (road)	20:26	Aminath Jaaisha Juneez	19 February 2022	Ras Al Khaimah 5K	Ras Al Khaimah, United Arab Emirates	
10,000 m	42:08.62	Mariyam Abdul Kareem	3 December 2019	South Asian Games	Kathmandu, Nepal	
10 km (road)	40:39+	Shamha Ahmed	17 September 2022	Oslo Marathon	Oslo, Norway	
15 km (road)	1:01:10+	Shamha Ahmed	20 January 2023	Bangabandhu International Half Marathon	Dhaka, Bangladesh	
20 km (road)	1:22:40+	Shamha Ahmed	17 September 2022	Oslo Marathon	Oslo, Norway	
Half marathon	1:26:42	Shamha Ahmed	20 January 2023	Bangabandhu International Half Marathon	Dhaka, Bangladesh	
Marathon	3:02:41	Shamha Ahmed	25 September 2022	Berlin Marathon	Berlin, Germany	
100 m hurdles	19.84	Nashfa Amira	30 October 2002		Bangkok, Thailand	
400 m hurdles						
3000 m steeplechase						
High jump	1.47 m	Rana Ahmed Sadiq	May 1996	4th Interschool Championships	Malé, Maldives	
High jump	1.50 m	Aishath Shaim Azeez	6 February 2023	Inter School Meet	Fuvahmulah, Maldives	
Pole vault						
Long jump	5.19 m (+0.1 m/s)	Mariyam Ru Ya Ali	12 November 2022	National Grand Prix	Hulhumalé, Maldives	
Triple jump	9.81 m NWI	Shain Rasheed	November 1996	10th National Meet	Malé, Maldives	
Triple jump	10.47 m NWI	Noora Abdul Hameed	17/19 March 2023	10th MILO Association Championships	Hulhumalé, Maldives	
Triple jump	10.63 m (+1.6 m/s)	Ahnaa Nizar	14 May 2023	Inter School Championships	Hulhumalé, Maldives	
Shot put	8.72 m	Aishath Eva Abdul Fafoor	December 2006	17th National Tournament	Malé, Maldives	
Discus throw	25.36 m	Aishath Eva Abdul Fafoor	December 2006	17th National Tournament	Malé, Maldives	
Discus throw	28.93 m	Aishath Mohamed	25 August 2022	Maldivian Championships	Malé, Maldives	
Discus throw	29.99 m	Aishath Mohamed	17 March 2023	10th MILO Association Championships	Hulhumalé, Maldives	
Discus throw	32.46 m	Aishath Mohamed	24 November 2023	Maldivian Championships	Malé, Maldives	
Hammer throw						
Javelin throw	34.56 m	Aminath Shiura	18–20 December 2008	19th National Tournament	Malé, Maldives	
Heptathlon						
Heptathlon	100m H (wind) / High jump / Shot put / 200m (wind) / Long jump (wind) / Javelin / 800m					
3000 m walk (track)	21:10.99	Aminath Ali	December 2006	17th National Tournament	Malé, Maldives	
20 km walk (road)						
4 × 100 m relay	49.19	Maldives; Mariyam Hussain; Rifa Mohamed; Aishath Hassan; Aminath Mohamed	6 August 2022	Commonwealth Games	Birmingham, United Kingdom	
4 × 100 m relay	48.21	Maldives; Mariyam Hussain; Rifa Mohamed; Aishath Hassan; Aminath Mohamed	12 August 2022	Islamic Solidarity Games	Konya, Turkey	
4 × 200 m relay	2:02.38	Aminiya School (U16)	March 2002	9th Interschool Championships	Malé, Maldives	
4 × 400 m relay	4:15.0 h	Maldives; Mariyam Hana; Saufa Ibrahim Hilmy; Risfa Mohamed; Aishath Zoona Moosa	23 April 2011	14th Interschool	Malé, Maldives	

=== Mixed ===
Event	Record	Athlete	Date	Meet	Place	Ref.
4 × 400 m relay	3:44.98	Maldives; Hussain Zeek Suad; H. Muznaa Faiz; Adam Riffath; A. Asadh Waj	30 June 2024	Indian Inter-State Championships	Panchkula, India	

== Indoor ==
=== Men ===
Event	Record	Athlete	Date	Meet	Place	Ref.
60 m	6.75	Hassan Saaid	19 February 2016	Asian Championships	Doha, Qatar	
200 m						
400 m	49.98	Mohamed Naail	2 March 2018	World Championships	Birmingham, United Kingdom	
800 m	1:58.17	Naseer Ismail	5 March 1999	World Championships	Maebashi, Japan	
1500 m						
3000 m						
60 m hurdles						
High jump						
Pole vault						
Long jump						
Triple jump						
Shot put						
Heptathlon						
Heptathlon	60m / Long jump / Shot put / High jump / 60m H / Pole vault / 1000m					
5000 m walk						
4 × 400 m relay						

=== Women ===
Event	Record	Athlete	Date	Meet	Place	Ref.
60 m	7.66	Mariyam Ru Ya Ali	10 February 2023	Asian Championships	Astana, Kazakhstan	
200 m	28.71	Shamila Abdul Majeed	9 March 2001	World Championships	Lisbon, Portugal	
400 m						
800 m	2:37.21	Fathmath Hasma	10 February 2006	Asian Championships	Pattaya, Thailand	
800 m	2:22.30	Fasuhaa Ahmed	19 February 2024	Asian Championships	Tehran, Iran	
1500 m	5:34.68	Fathmath Hasma	12 February 2006	Asian Championships	Pattaya, Thailand	
3000 m						
60 m hurdles						
High jump						
Pole vault						
Long jump						
Triple jump						
Shot put						
Pentathlon						
Pentathlon	60m H / High jump / Shot put / Long jump / 800m					
3000 m walk						
4 × 400 m relay						
