= Alexus Laird =

American-Seychellois swimmer

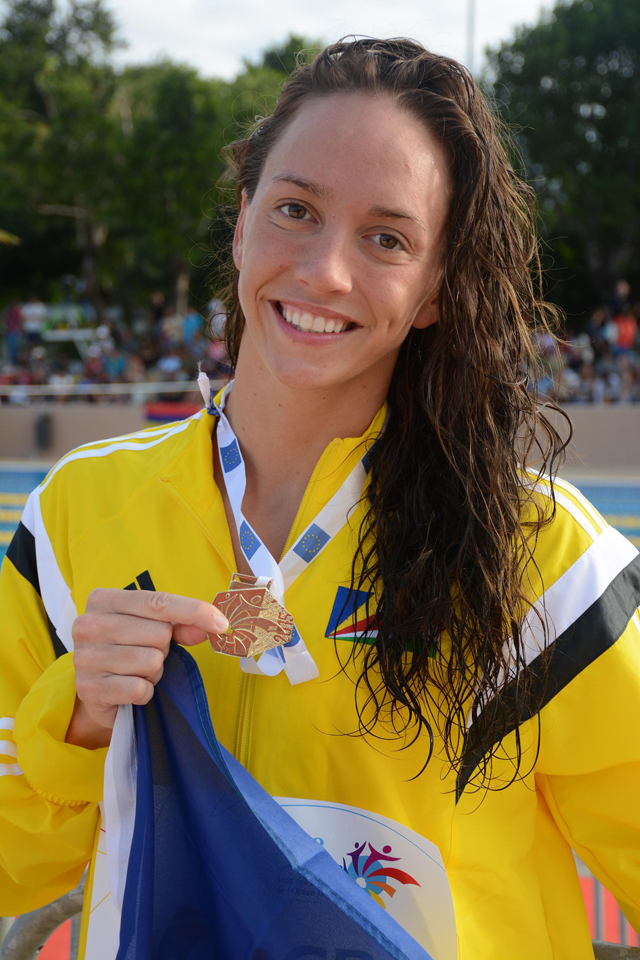
- Laird in 2015

Personal information
- Full name: Alexus Lucienne Laird
- Nationality: American-Seychellois
- Born: 11 March 1993 (age 33) Kokomo, Indiana, USA
- Height: 172 cm (5 ft 8 in)
- Weight: 61 kg (134 lb)

Sport
- Sport: Swimming
- Event: Backstroke
- Club: Carmel Swim Club
Medal record
Women's swimming
Representing Seychelles
African Games
Bronze medal – third place	2015 Brazzaville	50 m backstroke
Indian Ocean Island Games
Gold medal – first place	2015 Saint-Denis	50 m backstroke
Gold medal – first place	2015 Saint-Denis	100 m backstroke
Gold medal – first place	2015 Saint-Denis	200 m backstroke
Silver medal – second place	2015 Saint-Denis	50 m freestyle
Bronze medal – third place	2015 Saint-Denis	4×100 m freestyle relay
- Updated on 25 August 2016

Alexus Lucienne Laird (born 11 March 1993) is an American-Seychellois swimmer. At the 2016 Summer Olympics she competed in the Women's 100 m backstroke.
