= Cyprea Group =

Maldivian conglomerate company

- Type: Privately held company
- Industry: Conglomerate
- Founded: 1977; 49 years ago
- Founder: Abdulla Saeed
- Headquarters: The Cyprea, Male', Maldives
- Key people: Abdulla Saeed (Chairman & Managing Director); Ibrahim Saleem (Director); Abdullah Hameed (Director); Mohamed Shareef (Director); Adam Manik (Director)
- Subsidiaries: Cyprea Private Limited; Cyprea Hotels & Travel Private Limited; Cyprea Marine Foods Private Limited; Alba International Private Limited; Vivco Energy Solutions Private Limited; Go Maldives Private Limited
- Website: www.cyprea.com.mv

The Cyprea Group is one of the largest business entities in the Maldives. Cyprea Group is a private conglomerate which is amongst the largest private businesses in the Maldives with major operations in airline ticketing, inbound and outbound travel, cargo import and export, fish processing, courier service, fuel supply & bunkering service.

== History ==
In August 2017, Minor Hotels joint ventures with Cyprea Group to develop AVANI Fares Resort in Maldives.

In November 2019, DFCC Bank of Sri Lanka entered a breakthrough partnership with Cyprea Group for a dual-tranche bilateral term loan, together with a trade finance and guarantee facility. This transaction is the single largest bilateral deal arranged by DFCC Bank to date.

== Subsidiaries ==
Cyprea Private Limited - Cyprea Private Limited was established in 1977 as a limited liability company, manifesting the true essence of partnership to venture into the various business opportunities in the Maldives. Cyprea Private Limited is the owner of Kanifinolhu Resort. At present the resort is being managed by Club Med.

Cyprea Hotels & Travel Private Limited - Cyprea Hotels & Travel Private Limited is an IATA accredited travel management company founded in 1978. Their clients base consists of Tour Operators and Travel Agencies, Airlines, Cruise Operators and Event Organizers from around the world.

Cyprea Marine Foods Private Limited - Cyprea Marine Foods Private Limited operates an EU certified fish processing factory in Kaafu Atoll, Himafushi, to cater value added products mainly to Europe. As an MSC certified sustainable seafood supplier, the factory is currently exporting fresh chilled fish, which includes mainly Yellow Fin Tuna (whole and loins) and reef fish varieties.
