= Jordy Vadamootoo =

Dutch boxer (born 1995)

Personal information
- Nationality: Mauritian
- Born: Jean Jordy Vadamootoo; 23 May 1995 (age 31) Quatre Bornes, Mauritius
- Height: 1.75 m (5 ft 9 in)
- Weight: Bantamweight; Lightweight; Light-welterweight

Boxing career
Medal record
Men's amateur boxing
Representing Mauritius
African Championships
Gold medal – first place	2017 Brazzaville	Bantamweight
Indian Ocean Games
Gold medal – first place	2015 Saint-Pierre	Bantamweight

Jean Jordy Vadamootoo (born 23 May 1995), known as Jordy Vadamootoo, is a Mauritian amateur boxer who won a bantamweight gold medal at the 2017 African Championships and competed at the 2017 World Championships.

He was also one of three members of the Mauritian delegation to win a boxing gold medal at the 2015 Indian Ocean Island Games, along with Merven Clair and Richarno Colin.

== Amateur career ==
Hailing from the town of Quatre Bornes and inspired by local boxer Yanish Hurpersand, Vadamootoo joined the Nelson Mandela Boxing Club at the age of 17 to "become like him and have the chance to compete abroad." Following two medals at the youth national championships, Vadamootoo competed in his first senior national championships in 2014, fighting at flyweight. In his semi-final bout against Olivier Laverdure, Vadamootoo was originally declared the winner before the decision was overturned due to an apparent judge's error. His trainer, Sébastien Beeharry, verbally attacked the president of the referees commission and the AIBA competition supervisor in protest. Nevertheless, his performance led to a call-up to the national team.

After moving up a weight class to bantamweight, his first international competition was the 2015 Indian Ocean Island Games in Réunion. He eliminated the local favorite, Jordan Rodriguez, before defeating Sitrakiniazina Rakotamanga of Madagascar by way of unanimous decision (UD) for the surprise gold medal. A few weeks later, he suffered a first-round exit from the 2015 African Championships at the hands of eventual silver medallist Bilel Mhamdi. In 2016, he was not selected to compete at the African Olympic Qualification Tournament in Cameroon, but did become national champion for the first time. Vadamootoo won four straight fights at the 2017 African Championships in Brazzaville to take home the gold medal, becoming the first African bantamweight champion from Mauritius since Bruno Julie ten years before. He went on to make an appearance at the 2017 World Championships in Hamburg, losing to Mykola Butsenko in the first round. After a stint at lightweight, he made his return to bantamweight in time for the 2018 Commonwealth Games, where he lost his first bout by narrow decision to Moroke Mokhotho.

In June 2018 the International Olympic Committee (IOC) decided to suddenly suspend the Mauritius Olympic Committee scholarship grants given to Vadamootoo and one other boxer due to a dispute with AIBA. Later that month he competed at the Thailand Open International Boxing Tournament in Bangkok, making his debut at light-welterweight. He was the only member of his delegation to move past the first round, beating Dorji Wangdi of Bhutan before losing to the tournament's number one seed Dinindu Saparamadu. However, facing financial difficulties and an overall disillusionment with the boxing bureaucracy, he stepped away from the Mauritius Boxing Association (AMB). He was forced to give up full-time training and work as a mechanic, effectively ending his hopes of repeating as champion at the 2019 Indian Ocean Island Games. After a few months of inactivity, the AMB approved his return in early 2019.

=== Amateur results ===
- 2012 Youth National Championship in Vacoas-Phoenix, Mauritius (light-bantamweight)
  - Lost to Donovan Gérie PTS (bronze)
- 2013 Youth National Championship in Vacoas-Phoenix, Mauritius (light-bantamweight)
  - Lost to David Rolfo 2–3 (silver)
- 2014 National Championships in Vacoas-Phoenix/Curepipe, Mauritius (flyweight)
  - Defeated James Marie TKO2
  - Lost to Olivier Laverdure PTS (bronze)
- 2015 National Championships in Vacoas-Phoenix, Mauritius (bantamweight) (bronze)
- 2015 Indian Ocean Island Games in Saint-Pierre, Réunion (bantamweight)
  - Defeated Jordan Rodriguez (Réunion) PTS
  - Defeated Sitrakiniazina Rakotamanga (Madagascar) 3–0 (gold)
- 2015 African Championships in Casablanca, Morocco (bantamweight)
  - Lost to Bilel Mhamdi (Tunisia) 0–3
- 2016 National Championships in Vacoas-Phoenix, Mauritius (bantamweight) (gold)
- 2017 National Championships in Vacoas-Phoenix, Mauritius (lightweight)
  - Lost to Jean John Colin PTS (silver)

- 2017 African Championships in Brazzaville, Republic of the Congo (bantamweight)
  - Defeated Mzwabantu Mbhexeshi (South Africa) 3–2
  - Defeated Martin Oduor (Kenya) 5–0
  - Defeated Gerson Rocha (Cape Verde) 5–0
  - Defeated Geoffrey Kakeeto (Uganda) 5–0 (gold)
- 2017 World Championships in Hamburg, Germany (bantamweight)
  - Lost to Mykola Butsenko (Ukraine) 0–5
- 2018 Strandja Memorial in Sofia, Bulgaria (lightweight)
  - Lost to Wu Yufeng (China) 0–5
- 2018 Commonwealth Games in Gold Coast, Australia (bantamweight)
  - Lost to Moroke Mokhotho (Lesotho) 2–3
- 2018 Thailand Open International Tournament in Bangkok, Thailand (light-welterweight)
  - Defeated Dorji Wangdi (Bhutan) 5–0
  - Lost to Dinindu Saparamadu (Sri Lanka) 0–5
- 2019 National Championships in Vacoas-Phoenix, Mauritius (light-welterweight)
  - Defeated Prosper Lindsay TKO2
  - Defeated Adele Mootean 3–2
  - Lost to Richarno Colin 0–5 (silver)

== Personal life ==
Vadamootoo worked at a motorcycle workshop in Belle Rose, and considers riding motorcycles another passion of his apart from boxing.
