= Boxing at the 2015 Indian Ocean Island Games =

Boxing at the 2015 Indian Ocean Island Games was held at Gymnase Nelson Mandela, Saint-Pierre, Réunion.

== Medalist ==
=== Men ===
Event	Gold	Silver	Bronze
Light flyweight	Kevin Tsang Hing Lam; Réunion	Lalaina Rabenarivo; Madagascar	Jean-David Rolfo; Mauritius
Flyweight	Marcus Gévia; Réunion	Ludovic Bactora; Mauritius	Rutchie Tombo; Madagascar
Featherweight	Jordy Vadamootoo; Mauritius	Heritovo Sitrakiniaina Rakotomanga; Madagascar	Alvin Botsoie; Seychelles
Featherweight	Jordy Vadamootoo; Mauritius	Heritovo Sitrakiniaina Rakotomanga; Madagascar	Jordan Rodriguez; Réunion
Lightweight	Eric Dagard; Réunion	Andrique Allisop; Seychelles	John Colin; Mauritius
Light welterweight	Richarno Colin; Mauritius	Nomenjanahary Julien Rajaonarison; Madagascar	Bertrand Pasquin; Réunion
Light welterweight	Richarno Colin; Mauritius	Nomenjanahary Julien Rajaonarison; Madagascar	Lorenzo Bonne; Seychelles
Welterweight	Félix Morvan; Réunion	Alva Botsoie; Seychelles	Jean-Luc Rosalba; Mauritius
Middleweight	Merven Clair; Mauritius	Jean Jovet; Seychelles	Georges Castel; Réunion
Middleweight	Merven Clair; Mauritius	Jean Jovet; Seychelles	Haja Takaloniaina; Madagascar
Light heavyweight	Clément Hong Sik Kee; Réunion	Clément Olivier; Mauritius	Nigel Benoit; Seychelles
Heavyweight	Keven Kilindo; Seychelles	Florent Kaouachi; Réunion	Rodolphe Randrimanantena; Madagascar
Heavyweight	Keven Kilindo; Seychelles	Florent Kaouachi; Réunion	Jacques Raphael; Mauritius
Super heavyweight	Keddy Agnes; Seychelles	Emmanuel Payet; Réunion	Danilo Gaspard; Mauritius
