= Swimming at the 2015 Indian Ocean Island Games =

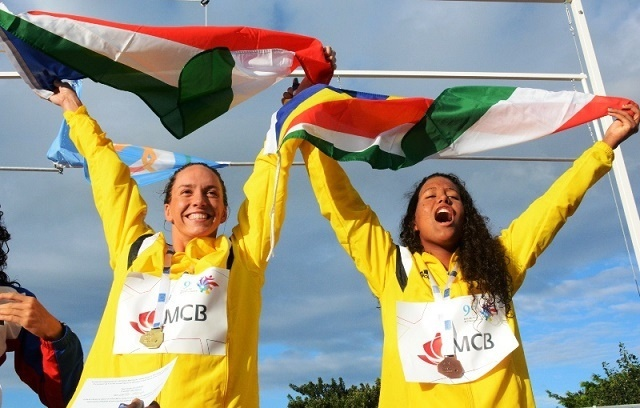
Seychelloise swimmers Alexus Laird (left) and Felicity Passon after winning the gold and bronze medals in the 50 metre backstroke

Swimming at the 2015 Indian Ocean Island Games was held at Piscine Michel Debré, Saint-Denis, Réunion.

== Medalist ==
=== Men ===
Event	Gold		Silver		Bronze	
50 m freestyle	Bradley Vincent; Mauritius	23.10	Dimitri Faubourg; Réunion	23.30	Anthonny Sitraka Ralefy; Madagascar	24.30 NR
100 m freestyle	Bradley Vincent; Mauritius	50.50	Dimitri Faubourg; Réunion	52.20	Mathieu Gilles Marquet; Mauritius	53.30
200 m freestyle	Benoît Debast; Réunion	1:51.50	Mathieu Bachmann; Réunion	1:55.70	Mathieu Gilles Marquet; Mauritius	1:56.90
400 m freestyle	Benoît Debast; Réunion	3:54.97	Mathieu Gilles Marquet; Mauritius	4:15.29	Steven Mangroo; Seychelles	4:18.07
1500 m freestyle	Benoît Debast; Réunion	15:30.10	Simon Bachmann; Réunion	17:16.20	Steven Mangroo; Seychelles	17:20.90
50 m backstroke	Pierre-Yves Desprez; Réunion	26.90	Damien Delmotte; Réunion	28.60	Lalanomena Anthony Andrianirina; Madagascar	29.40
100 m backstroke	Pierre-Yves Desprez; Réunion	58.40	Damien Delmotte; Réunion	1:01.34	Heriniavo Michael Rasolonjatovo; Madagascar	1:02.32
200 m backstroke	Jean-Patrick Bernet; Réunion	2:16.20	Heriniavo Michael Rasolonjatovo; Madagascar	2:18.40	Lalanomena Anthony Andrianirina; Madagascar	2:18.60
50 m breaststroke	Dimitri Faubourg; Réunion	29.26	Darren Chan Chin Wah; Mauritius	29.55	Olivier Ah Ching; Mauritius	30.16
100 m breaststroke	Darren Chan Chin Wah; Mauritius	1:04.00	Yannick Chatelain; Réunion	1:06.10	Olivier Ah Ching; Mauritius	1:07.00
200 m breaststroke	Yannick Chatelain; Réunion	2:19.50	Darren Chan Chin Wah; Mauritius	2:22.00	Quentin Pereira; Réunion	2:31.60
50 m butterfly	Anthonny-Sitraka Ralefy; Madagascar	24.60	Bradley Vincent; Mauritius	25.40	Mathieu Bachmann; Réunion	25.50
100 m butterfly	Mathieu Bachmann; Réunion	55.57	Anthonny-Sitraka Ralefy; Madagascar	56.11	Kevin Lucian; Réunion	57.80
200 m butterfly	William Moulon; Réunion	2:07.20	Jean-Patrick Bernet; Réunion	2:08.70	Waren Hau Kim Fong; Mauritius	2:20.80
200 m individual medley	Yannick Chatelain; Réunion	2:07.10	Simon Bachmann; Réunion	2:17.20	Waren Hau Kim Fong; Mauritius	2:17.80
400 m individual medley	Yannick Chatelain; Réunion	4:38.40	Simon Bachmann; Réunion	4:50.60	Waren Hau Kim Fong; Mauritius	4:54.20
4 × 100 m freestyle relay	Mauritius (MRI); Vincent Bradley; Darren Chan Chin Wah; Yohan Lim; Mathieu Gilles Marquet	3:28.23	Réunion (RUN); Mathieu Bachmann; Nathan Mandere; Dimitri Faubourg; Benoît Debast	3:29.10	Seychelles (SEY); Steeven Mangroo; Adrian Nanty; Dean Hoffman; Adam Viktora	3:40.03
4 × 200 m freestyle relay	Réunion (RUN)	7:41.70	Seychelles (SEY)	8:02.60	Mauritius (MRI)	8:17.60
4 × 100 m medley relay	Réunion (RUN)	3:52.41	Mauritius (MRI)	4:02.76	Madagascar (MAD)	4:11.43
50 m freestyle H	Hugo Hoi; Réunion	27.9	Suffian Ropun; Mauritius	33.9	-	-
50 m freestyle H	Victor Scody; Mauritius	33.0	Alain Curco Llovera; Réunion	55.5	-	-
50 m freestyle adapted	Gawtam Dev Kokil; Mauritius	35.8	Pierrot Etheve; Réunion	36.1	-	-

=== Women ===
Event	Gold		Silver		Bronze	
50 m freestyle	Alizée Morel; Réunion	26.60	Alexus Laird; Seychelles	26.68	Felicity Elizabeth Passon; Seychelles	26.72
100 m freestyle	Alizée Morel; Réunion	56.30	Felicity Elizabeth Passon; Seychelles	58.30	Heather Ann Arseth; Mauritius	58.80
200 m freestyle	Alizée Morel; Réunion	2:04.30	Felicity Elizabeth Passon; Seychelles	2:08.10	Romane Petit; Réunion	2:09.10
400 m freestyle	Alizée Morel; Réunion	4:19.03	Mathilde Hoareau; Réunion	4:26.32	Layne Lim Ah Tock; Mauritius	4:46.62
800 m freestyle	Alizée Morel; Réunion	9:21.00	Romane Petit; Réunion	9:25.60	Melodie Naidoo; Mauritius	9:55.40
50 m backstroke	Alexus Laird; Seychelles	29.50	Aïnoa Boucher; Réunion	31.10	Felicity Elizabeth Passon; Seychelles	31.60
100 m backstroke	Alexus Laird; Seychelles	1:03.52	Heather Ann Arseth; Mauritius	1:06.27	Christelle Bertsch; Réunion	1:06.40
200 m backstroke	Alexus Laird; Seychelles	2:22.80	Romane Petit; Réunion	2:26.80	Manon Dijoux; Réunion	2:27.10
50 m breaststroke	Géraldine Huffner; Réunion	33.49	Jodie Foulquier; Réunion	34.15	Elodie Poo Cheong; Mauritius	34.79
100 m breaststroke	Géraldine Huffner; Réunion	1:13.20	Jodie Foulquier; Réunion	1:15.40	Elodie Poo Cheong; Mauritius	1:20.00
200 m breaststroke	Géraldine Huffner; Réunion	2:37.70	Chloé Fierla; Réunion	2:47.70	Leah Foo Sem Fah; Mauritius	3:05.10
50 m butterfly	Emma Morel; Réunion	28.04	Heather Ann Arseth; Mauritius	28.50	-	-
50 m butterfly	Emma Morel; Réunion	28.04	Felicity Elizabeth Passon; Seychelles	28.50	-	-
100 m butterfly	Emma Morel; Réunion	1:01.99	Felicity Elizabeth Passon; Seychelles	1:02.67	Elodie Poo Cheong; Mauritius	1:03.86
200 m butterfly	Emma Morel; Réunion	2:19.90	Sarah Clain; Réunion	2:27.20	Felicity Elizabeth Passon; Seychelles	2:28.60
200 m individual medley	Aïnoa Boucher; Réunion	2:24.20	Mathilde Hoareau; Réunion	2:24.70	Elodie Poo Cheong; Mauritius	2:30.20
400 m individual medley	Mathilde Hoareau; Réunion	5:05.6	Vick Davy; Réunion	5:15.1	Tessa Ip Hen Cheung; Mauritius	5:46.8
4 × 100 m freestyle relay	Réunion (RUN); Aïnoa Boucher; Mathilde Hoareau; Emma Morel; Alizée Morel	3:56.30	Mauritius (MRI); Heather Ann Arseth; Ann Her; Elodie Poo Cheong; Olivia Chan Chee de Maroussem	3:58.80	Seychelles (SEY); Alexus Laird; Leyla Monti; Anisha Payet; Felicity Elizabeth Passon	4:12.20
4 × 200 m freestyle relay	Réunion (RUN)	8:39.33	Seychelles (SEY)	8:54.10	Mauritius (MRI)	8:54.13
4 × 100 m medley relay	Réunion (RUN)	4:21.52	Mauritius (MRI)	4:31.44	Seychelles (SEY)	4:47.84
50 m freestyle D	Jeysheeka Rungoo; Mauritius	38.8	Anne-Lise Turpin; Réunion	47.0	-	-
50 m freestyle D	Amélie Sidambrompoule; Réunion	1:01.8	Lavina Thancamamoutou; Mauritius	1:22.9	-	-
50 m freestyle adapted	Stéphanie Mondon; Mauritius	42.9	Geneviève Sautron; Réunion	55.6	-	-
