= Antalya Marathon =

Athlete

Runtalya Marathon
- Date: 06 April, 2025
- Location: Antalya, Turkey
- Event type: Athletic event
- Distance: Marathon, Half Marathon, 10K, 5K
- Primary sponsor: Fraport TAV
- Established: 2006; 20 years ago
- Organizer: Turset Project Management
- Website: https://tursetsports.com/races/runtalya

Runtalya Marathon (Turkish: Runtalya Maratonu), official name Runtalya presented by Fraport TAV (formerly known as Runatolia and International Öger Antalya Marathon (Turkish: Uluslararası Öger Antalya Maratonu) sponsored by the Germany-based Öger Tours of Turkish-German Vural Öger) is an international athletic event that takes place in Antalya annually since 2006. The marathon is usually organized in March. Sponsored by Fraport TAV it is the second only marathon race in Turkey to Istanbul Marathon. Renowned for its spring-like weather and unique course through nature and history, Runtalya offers a singular experience, transforming into a three-day sports festival blending healthy living with fun, encompassing pre-race, during, and post-race activities.

In 2024 Runtalya hosted over 10 000 participants from 54 countries.

== 2025 ==
Year 2025 marks the 20th anniversary of Runtalya Marathon.

Runtalya will take place on April 6, 2025. Not in March (as usual) because of the month of Ramadan (Mar 1, 2025 – Mar 29, 2025).

== Courses ==
- Marathon
- Half Marathon
- 10K & 10K Team - Available for individual athletes, running teams & clubs, and corporate teams.
- 5K - Social Walk & Run

The course is a turning point route. The route runs from Atatürk Kültür Merkezi through the old city past Hadrian's Gate and Yivliminare Mosque and continues parallel to the stunning cliffy coast. All race categories end in Cam Piramit where Runtalya Village - event expo is located.

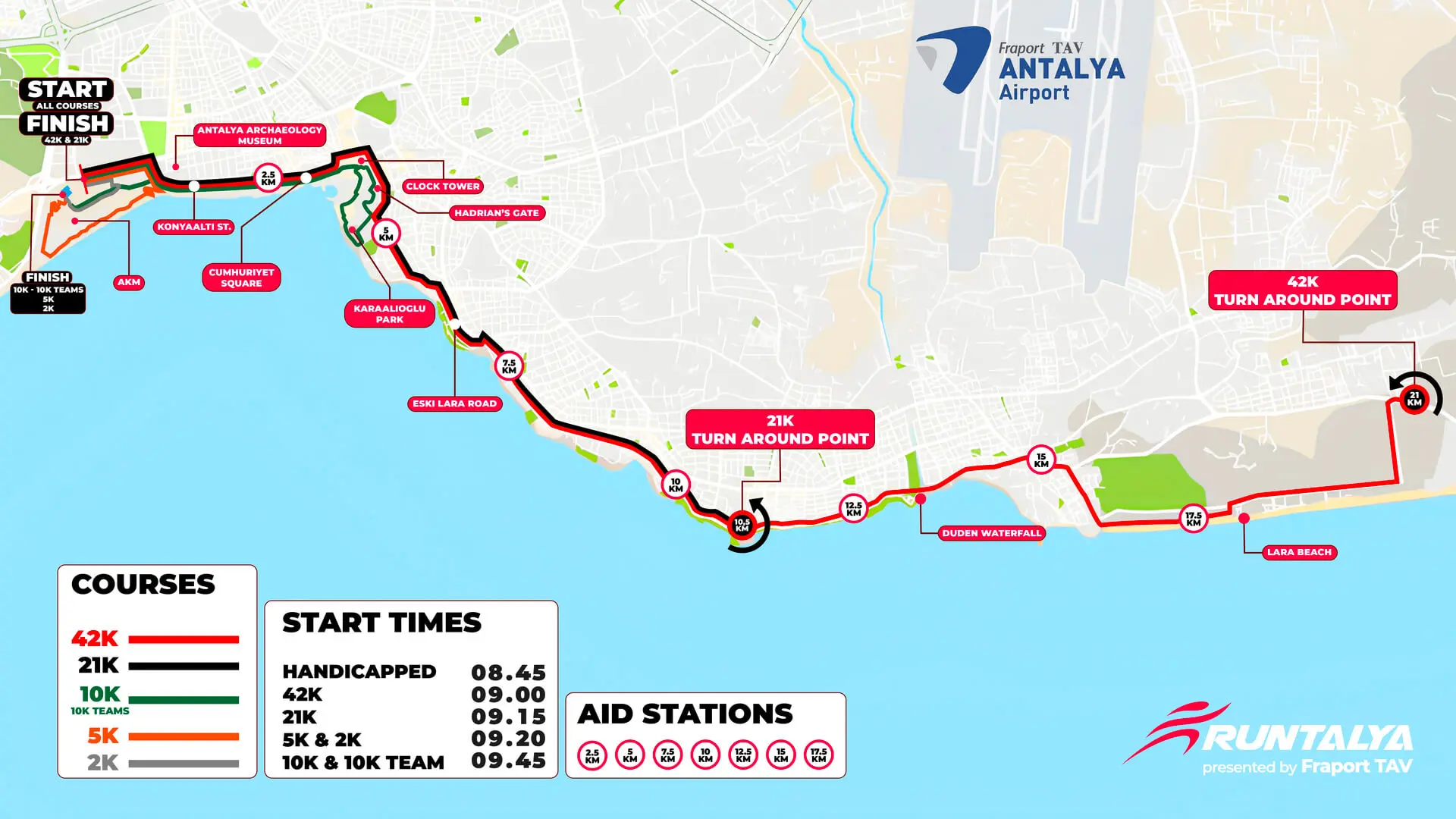
Runtalya Course Map

== Records ==
Marathon

- Men's 2:16:14 Phillip Makau Muia (KEN), 2008
- Women's: 2:42:55 Kristijna Loonen (NED), 2008

Half marathon

- Men's: 1:04:00 James Kirwa (KEN), 2007
- Women's 1:12:43 Bahar Doğan (TUR), 2009

10K

- Men's: 29:30 Bekir Karayel (TUR), 2009
- Women's: 33:09 Mariam Tanga (ETH), 2009

== Winners ==
Key: Course record

Year	Edition	Men's winner	Time (h:m:s)	Women's winner	Time (h:m:s)
2019	14th	(Turkey) Murat Kurtak	2:34:25	(Russia) Elena Nurgalieva	2:59:02
2018	13th	(Turkey) Murat Kurtak	2:33:12	(Russia) Olesya Nurgalieva	2:49:08
2017	12th	(Turkey) Serdar Çetin	2:37:02	(Russia) Natalia Gyurten	3:11:57
2016	11th	(Turkey) Ercan Arslan	2:27:08	(Moldova) Svetlana Șepelev-Tcaci	3:06:18
2015	10th	(Bulgaria) Shaban Mustafa	2:32:28	(Russia) Olesya Nurgalieva	2:46:34
2014	9th	(Bulgaria) Shaban Mustafa	2:26:34	(Moldova) Svetlana Șepelev-Tcaci	2:56:52
2013	8th	(Turkey) Murat Kaya	2:36:35	(Turkey) Lütfiye Kaya	3:01:29
2012	7th	(Turkey) Yücel Aydin	2:34:08	(Turkey) Lütfiye Kaya	2:52:21
2011	6th	(Turkey) Ahmet Arslan	2:38:09	(Germany) Birgit Lennartz	3:04:00
2010	5th	(Germany) Sascha Velten	2:36:46	(Germany) Birgit Lennartz	3:10:30
2009	4th	(Kenya) John Kioko	2:18:00	(Russia) Nadezhda Semiletova	2:44:19
2008	3rd	(Kenya) Phillip Muia	2:16:13	(Netherlands) Kristijna Loonen	2:42:54
2007	2nd	(Kenya) William Kurgat	2:19:23	(Tanzania) Monica Samila	2:49:47
2006	1st	(Kenya) Maurice Mukuthi	2:21:12	(Ukraine) Rimma Dubovik	2:54:38
