= Maldives at the 2015 Indian Ocean Island Games =

- IOC code: MDV
- NOC: Maldives Olympic Committee

in Réunion 31 July 2015 –
- Competitors: 240+ in 10 sports
- Flag bearer: Hassan Saaid
- Officials: 20+
- Medals: Gold 1 Silver 0 Bronze 1 Total 2

The Maldives competed in the 2015 Indian Ocean Island Games, held in Réunion an overseas French territory from 1 August to 8 August 2015.

== Medalists ==
Medal	Name	Sport	Event	Date
Gold medal	Hassan Saaid	Athletics	100 metres	2 August 2015
Bronze medal	Shamha Ahmed	Athletics	10000 metres	2 August 2015

== Table tennis ==
=== Men ===
Singles

Doubles

=== Women ===
Singles

Doubles

== Tennis ==
=== Men ===
Singles
Doubles
Team

=== Women ===
Singles
Doubles
Team

== Preparation and sponsorships ==
The Gujarat Cooperative Milk Marketing Federation, that manages dairy cooperative Amul, announced its memorandum of understanding (MoU) with the Indian Olympic Association on 11 July 2014. This MoU has made Amul the official sponsor of the Indian contingent at the 2014 Asian Games and Commonwealth Games, which was held in Glasgow, Scotland.
