= Stade Paul Julius Bénard =

Coordinates: 20°58′57″S 55°17′25″E

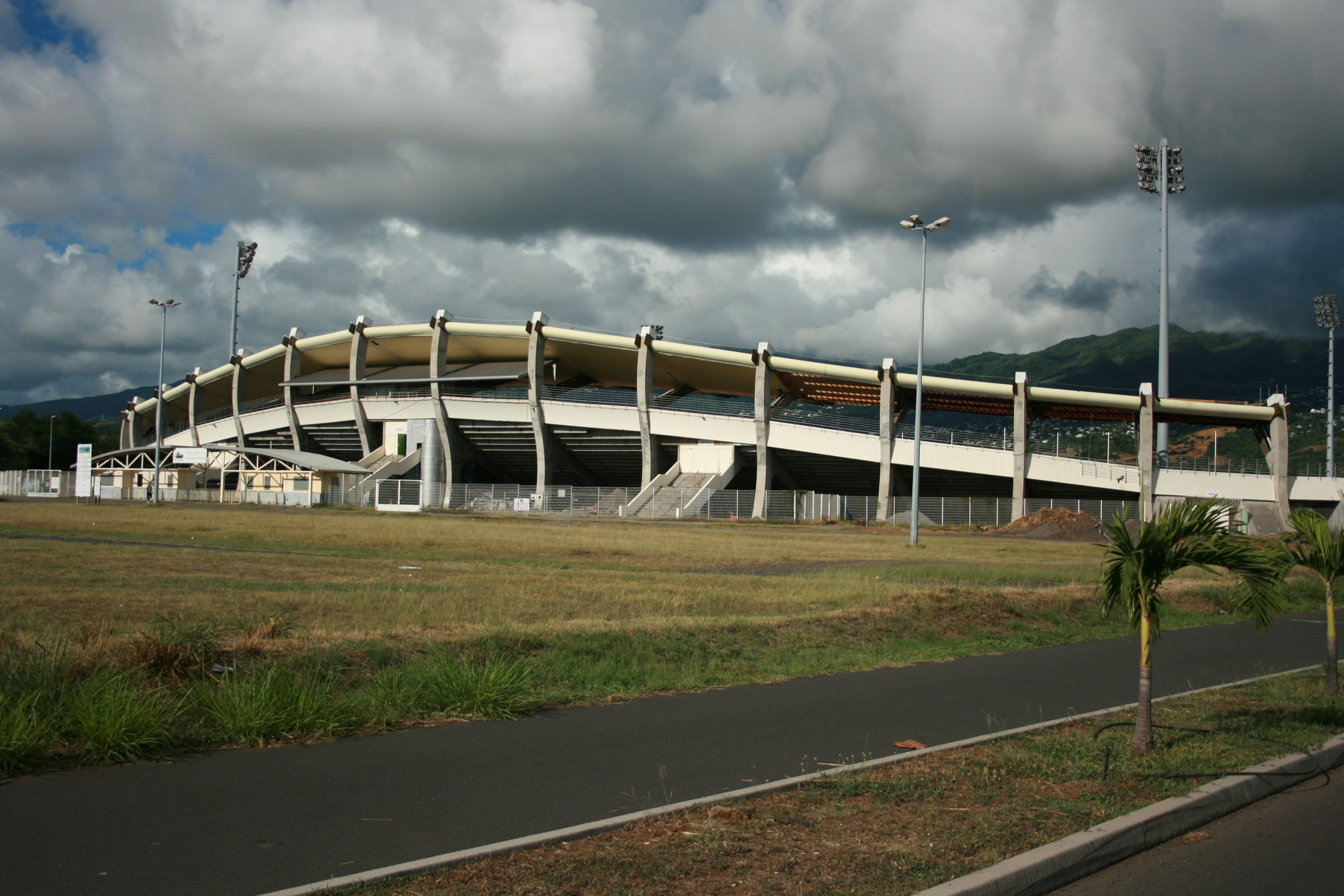
- Interactive map of Stade Paul Julius Bénard
- Full name: Olympic Stade Paul Julius Bénard
- Location: Saint-Paul, Réunion
- Owner: Saint-Pauloise FC
- Operator: Saint-Pauloise FC
- Capacity: 8,288

Construction
- Opened: 1979
- Renovated: 2012
- Expanded: May 26, 2012

Tenant
- Saint-Pauloise FC

The Olympic Stade Paul-Julius-Bénard, or officially the Stade olympique Bénard-Paul-Julius, is a stadium of the island of Réunion, Department of Overseas French and outermost region of the European Union in the southwest of the Indian Ocean. Main stadium of the town of St. Paul, it has a capacity of 8,288 seats at the games of the Saint-Pauloise FC and 12,000 for concerts. The stadium underwent major renovations which lasted 1 year and a half. It reopened on 26 May 2012 during a charity match between the friends of Zinedine Zidane and a selection of the Meeting.
