= Oslo Marathon =

Annual running event in Oslo, Norway

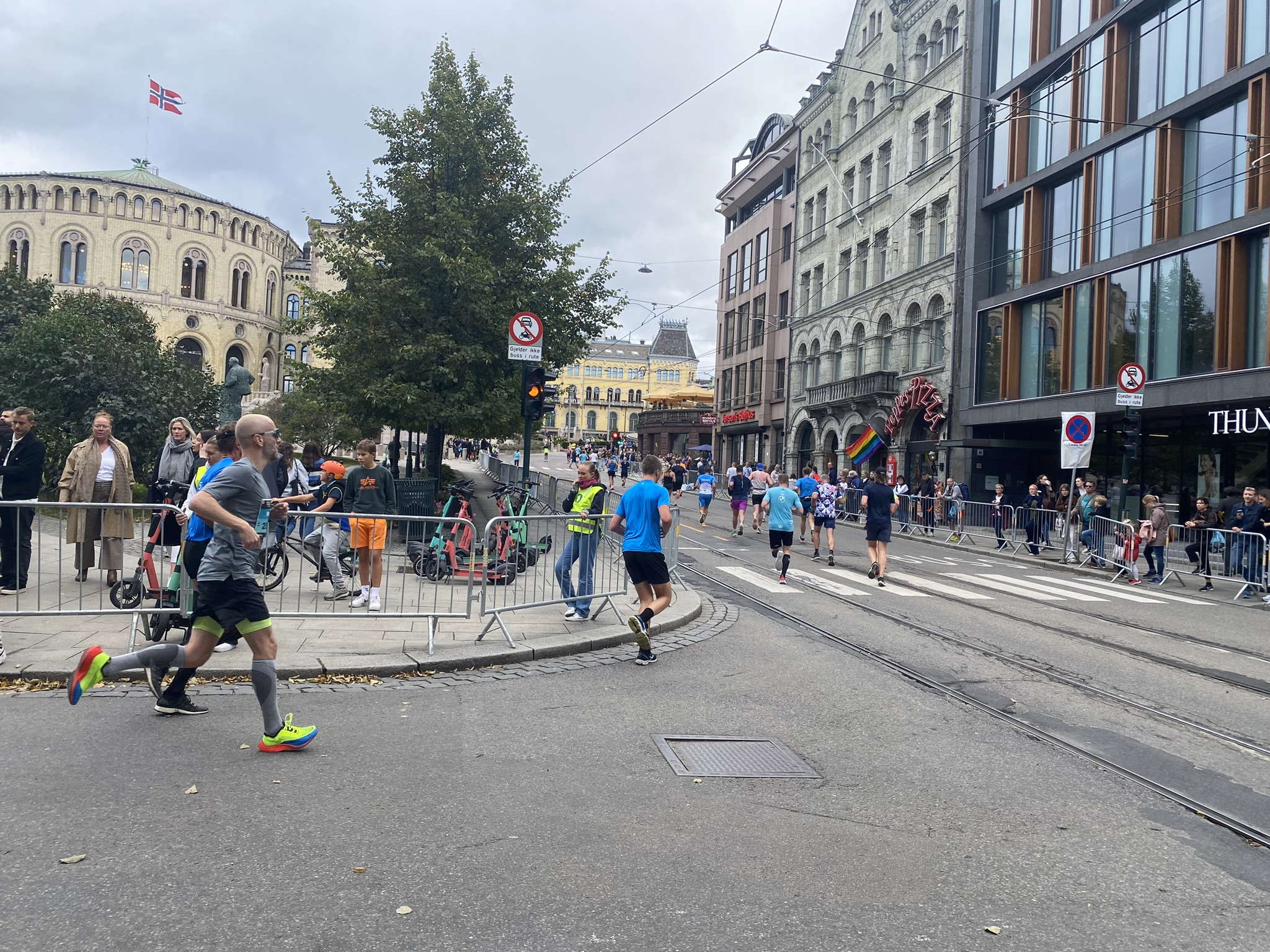
- Oslo Marathon in 2022
- Date: September
- Location: Oslo, Norway
- Event type: Road
- Distance: Marathon
- Primary sponsor: BMW
- Established: 2004
- Course records: Men's: 2:15:58 (2017) (Japan) Yuki Kawauchi; Women's: 2:43:26 (2022) (United States) Annie Bersagel
- Website: Official website
- Participants: 2,758 finishers (2021); 2,834 (2019)

The Oslo Marathon is an annual marathon that takes place at the end of September or the beginning of October. There are four distances; marathon, half-marathon, 10 and 3 km.

The track goes along the seaside of Oslofjord, with competitors in the marathon running it twice.

== History ==
The first Oslo Marathon took place in 1981. After some years without any long distance race, the capital of Norway re-launched the Oslo Marathon in 2004.

The number of participants in the 2010 edition was close to 16,000, of which almost 50% were women.

== Results ==
=== Marathon ===
Year	Winner men	Country	Time	Winner women	Country	Time
2025	Sjur Krystad	Norway	2:22:28	Maria Sagnes	Norway	2:40:59
2024	Håkon Brox	Norway	2:25:25	Helena Hope	Norway	2:51:43
2023	Tage Morken Augustson	Norway	2:25:44	Kristin Waaktaar Opland	Norway	2:44:20
2022	Ebrahim Abdulaziz	Norway	2:20:47	Annie Bersagel	United States	2:43:26
2019	Thomas Asgautsen	Norway	2:26:54	Marfa Troeva	Russia	2:54:12
2018	Ebrahim Abdulaziz	Norway	2:19:27	Marthe Myhre	Norway	2:46:48
2017	Yuki Kawauchi	Japan	2:15:58	Hilde Aders	Norway	2:54:31
2016	Marius Vedvik	Norway	2:21:53	Marthe Myhre	Norway	2:43:34
2015	Taye Tirfea	Ethiopia	2:20:49	Hilde Aders	Norway	2:52:35
2014	Taye Tirfea	Ethiopia	2:21:36	Laila Mehus	Norway	2:54:27
2013	Andreas Myhre	Norway	2:24:50	Marianne Johansen	Norway	2:47:57
2012	Øystein Sylta	Norway	2:25:42	Marthe Myhre	Norway	2:44:43
2011	Andreas Myhre	Norway	2:27:28	Marthe Myhre	Norway	2:52:30
2010	Andreas Høye	Norway	2:29:21	Fride Vullum-Bruer	Norway	2:45:34
2009	John Strupstad	Norway	2:32:29	Margaretha Baumann	Norway	2:49:49
2008	Martin Kjäll-Ohlsson	Norway	2:26:15	Sharon Broadwell	Norway	2:57:03
2007	Ronny Hognestad	Norway	2:35:04	Margaretha Baumann	Norway	2:52:26
2006	Henrik Sandstad	Norway	2:24:00	Margrethe Løgavlen	Norway	2:56:01
2005	Jan Helgeson	Norway	2:26:09	Sofie Spiten	Norway	2:54:08
2004	Carlos de Brito	Norway	2:27:05	Gry-Christine Wilhelmsen	Norway	2:51:53

=== Half Marathon ===
Year	Winner men	Country	Time	Winner women	Country	Time
2024	Brian Limo	Kenya	1:03:59	Annie Bersagel	United States	1:15:21
2023	Vebjørn Hovdejord	Norway	1:07:24	Runa Skrove Falch	Norway	1:17:33
2022	Marius Vedvik	Norway	1:07:50	Sakiho Tsutsui	Japan	1:13:04
2021	Sondre Nordstad Moen	Norway	1:02:43	Runa Skrove Falch	Norway	1:14:42
2019	Ådne Andersen	Norway	1:05:38	Annie Bersagel	United States	1:15:33
2018	Marius Vedvik	Norway	1:05:41	Runa Skrove Falch	Norway	1:15:49
2017	Okubamichael Fissehatsion	Eritrea	1:04:45	Runa Skrove Falch	Norway	1:16:32
2016	Okubamichael Fissehatsion	Eritrea	1:05:50	Rebecca Hilland	Norway	1:16:48
2015	Boniface Kirui	Kenya	1:03:24	Eleanor Davis	United Kingdom	1:15:45
2014	Sondre Nordstad Moen	Norway	1:02:59	Heidi Pharo	Norway	1:17:18
