= Ibrahim Saleem =

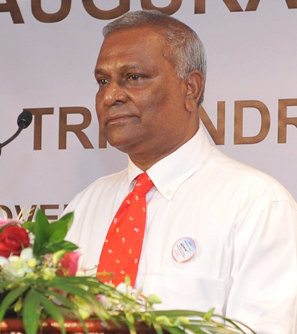
- Saleem in 2012
- Born: 14 August 1950 (age 75); Malé, Maldives
- Occupation: Businessman

Ibrahim Saleem (also known as Bandhu Ibrahim Saleem) is a local business expert in the Maldives. He commenced his career at the Office of the Prime Minister in 1967, from there on he has had an illustrious career spanning over 44 years, holding prominent posts, both in the public and private sector in Maldives.

== Career ==
Mr Saleem commenced his Government Services at the Office of the Prime Minister in 1967. He also served at the Maldives Shipping Limited until he was posted at the Department of Finance as an Assistant Director. In 1991. he became a Director at the Ministry of Finance. He was the Vice Governor of the Maldives to the World Bank from 1981 to 1987. He has also served as Member of the Board of Directors of Dhiraagu, the Maldives Telecommunications Company, Maldives National Shipping Limited and as Chairman of the Board of MTCC and the Maldives Finance Leasing Company. In 1993, Mr Saleem was appointed Managing Director of the Maldives Transport and Contracting Company (MTCC).

Mr Saleem was appointed the Honorary Consul of Italy in the Maldives in 1998.

He was also the Managing Director of Island Aviation Services 2002 to 2011. At the Island Aviation Services, he was instrumental in the expansion of the company in terms of the fleet capacity of aircraft and passenger flows; and commencing international operations. At present, he is appointed as the Chairman of the board of Island Aviation Services.
