= 2015 Indian Ocean Island Games =

- Official logo of IOIG 2015
- Host: Réunion
- Nations: 7
- Events: 173 in 14 sports
- Opening: 1 August
- Closing: 9 August
- Opened by: François Hollande
- Main venue: Stade Paul Julius Bénard
- Website: jeuxdesiles2015.re

The 2015 Indian Ocean Island Games, officially known as Jeux des îles de l'océan Indien Réunion 2015 or simply JIOI Réunion 2015, was the 9th edition of this multi-sport event for athletes representing the National Olympic Committees of Indian Ocean island nations. It was held in La Réunion from August 1 – August 9, 2015.

== Organisation ==
=== Venues ===
Venues	Sports
Stade Paul Julius Bénard	Athletics
Gymnase Michel Debré	Badminton
Complexe Sportif Municipal	Basketball
Gymnase Nelson Mandela	Boxing
Bras-Panon	Cycling
L'Étang-Salé	Cycling
Saint-Paul	Cycling
Stade Jean-Ivoula	Football
Stade Michel Volnay	Football
Stade Jean-Allane	Football
Stade Klébert Picard	Football
Stade Baby-Larivière	Football
Stade Georges Lambrakis	Football
Gymnase Daniel Narcisse	Handball
Dojo Regional De Saint Denis	Judo
Base Nautique des Mascareignes	Sailing
Piscine Michel Debré	Swimming
Le gymnase des Deux Canons rénové	Table tennis
Tennis Club Municipal de Champ Fleuri	Tennis
Gymnase de Champ-Fleuri	Volleyball
Municipal Gymnasium	Volleyball
Gymnase du Moufia	Weightlifting

== The Games ==
=== Participating IOCs ===
Over 2,000 athletes, from 7 countries, participated in the 2015 Indian Ocean Island Games.

Participating International Olympic Committees
- Madagascar
- Maldives
- Mauritius
- Mayotte
- Réunion (host)
- Seychelles

The Comoros were to participate but withdrew, protesting the waving of the French flag and singing of the French national anthem for the Mayotte team.

=== Sports ===
A total of 14 sports were represented in the 2015 Indian Ocean Island Games.

- Athletics (62)
- Badminton (5)
- Basketball (2)
- Boxing (10)
- Cycling (3)
- Football (2)
- Handball (1)
- Judo (24)
- Sailing (9)
- Swimming (20)
- Table tennis (14)
- Tennis (4)
- Volleyball (2)
- Weightlifting (15)

=== Medal table ===
* Host nation (Réunion)

Rank	Nation	Gold	Silver	Bronze	Total
1	Réunion (REU)*	84	72	53	209
2	Mauritius (MRI)	66	49	70	185
3	Madagascar (MAD)	36	45	42	123
4	Seychelles (SEY)	25	40	31	96
5	Mayotte (MYT)	2	6	5	13
6	Maldives (MDV)	1	2	5	8
Totals (6 entries)		214	214	206	634
